= Elvis Perrodin =

American horse racing jockey (1956–2012)

Personal information
- Born: December 14, 1956 Rayne, Louisiana, U.S.
- Died: June 10, 2012 (aged 55) Haughton, Louisiana, U.S.
- Occupation: Jockey

Horse racing career
- Sport: Horse racing
- Career wins: 3,083

Major racing wins
- Crescent City Derby (1977, 1979, 1991, 2006); Old Hickory Stakes (1979, 1982); Tenacious Handicap (1979, 1980, 1983); Thanksgiving Handicap (1980, 1982, 1987, 1998); Louisiana Futurity (1981, 2004); Bayou Handicap (1982, 1988); Esplanade Stakes (1983, 1985, 1989, 2006); Louisiana Handicap (1983, 1993, 1997); New Orleans Handicap (1983); Pan Zareta Stakes (1983, 1984, 1991); Truly Bound Handicap (1987, 1989, 1990); Woodchopper Stakes (1987, 2005); Fair Grounds Oaks (1988, 1993); Colonel E.R. Bradley Handicap (1990); Happy Ticket Stakes (1990, 1994, 2005); Lecomte Stakes (1993); Risen Star Stakes (1996); Valor Farm Stakes (1997, 1998); Dr. A.B. Leggio Memorial Stakes (1998); Ouija Board Handicap (1998); Louisiana Champions Day Turf (2000); Mississippi Futurity (2000); Fair Grounds Handicap (2001); John B. Connally Turf Cup (2001, 2002, 2003); Explosive Bid Handicap (2003); Colonel Power Stakes (2005, 2007); Duncan F. Kenner Stakes (2005); Gentilly Stakes (2005); Louisiana Champions Day Juvenile Stakes (2005); Louisiana Champions Day Ladies Stakes (2005); Tiffany Lass Stakes (2005); Louisiana Champions Day Ladies Sprint (2006); Lafayette Stakes (2007); Crescent City Oaks (2010)

Honours
- Fair Grounds Racing Hall of Fame (2013)

Significant horses
- Listcapade, Majesty's Imp

Elvis Joseph "Tee-Joe" Perrodin (December 14, 1956 – June 10, 2012) was an American jockey in Thoroughbred horse racing who won more than 3,000 races, rode six winners on a single racecard, and someone the Thoroughbred Times called "a master of the Fair Grounds turf'."

Nicknamed "Tee-Joe" which translates from Cajun French to "Little Joe," on February 3, 2012, Perrodin announced his retirement. Only days later, he was diagnosed as having brain cancer, already advanced to the 4th stage. He died of lung cancer on June 10, 2012, at the age of 55.

In 2013, Elvis J. Perrodin was inducted in the Fair Grounds Racing Hall of Fame.
