= Star Guitar (horse) =

American-bred Thoroughbred racehorse

- Sire: Quiet American
- Grandsire: Fappiano
- Dam: Minit Towinit
- Damsire: Malagra
- Sex: Stallion
- Foaled: 2005
- Country: United States
- Color: Bay
- Breeder: Brittlyn Stable Inc. & Maurice Benoit & Evelyn Benoit
- Owner: Brittlyn Stable Inc. (Evelyn Benoit)
- Trainer: Albert Stall Jr.
- Record: 30: 24-0-2
- Earnings: US$1,749,862

Awards
- Louisiana Champion Two-Year-Old Colt (2007); Louisiana-bred Horse of the Year (4 times); Louisiana Champion Older Horse (3 times)

Honors
- Fair Grounds Racing Hall of Fame (2013)
- Last updated on July 16, 2020

Star Guitar (foaled March 11, 2005 in Louisiana) is a retired Thoroughbred racehorse considered one of the most significant Louisiana-bred racehorses of all time. He won the Louisiana-bred Horse of the Year title 4 times, as well as the state's Champion Older Horse three times and the Champion Two Year Old Colt award. He retired as the richest Louisiana-bred horse of all time with earnings of $1.75 million.

== Background ==
Star Guitar is a light bay stallion by Champion sire Quiet American, who also sired Triple Crown near miss Real Quiet, as well as Quiet Dance who produced, successful sire Horse of the Year and Breeders Cup Classic winner Saint Liam. His Dam was Minit Towinit who was a Louisiana bred stakes winner who ended her career running in claiming races.

== Two-year-old-season ==
Star Guitar waited a little longer than most two-year-olds to race. He only had two races that year. First was his debut race at the Fair Grounds. He stayed near the leaders and saved his big move until they were nearing the far turn. Then he made a very sharp move at the far turn causing the jockey of the second-place finisher to lose his whip. In the end Star Guitar drew off to win by 6 3/4 lengths. The race was so impressive that in his next start he ran in the Louisiana Champions Day Juvenile Stakes. This time he was restrained early and was eighth at the start of the race after a bit he was let go and went 4 wide and slowly but surely pulled away to win by 1/2 length. His 2007 performances would earn Star Guitar the award for Louisiana Champion Two-Year-Old Horse.

== Three-year-old-season ==
Star Guitar had a nine-month break from racing before he returned in a 2008 allowance race. He started fifth and then went wide to be third but never got to catch up to the leaders and finished third. Finally in his second attempt he managed a to win by being just behind the leaders and then easily drew off to win by three lengths. Next he went for his second Louisiana Champions Day Sprint Stakes. When the race started he was undeterred and stayed behind in eighth but only moved up to fifth at the far turn but galloped by everyone to win by 3/4 of a length.

== Four-year-old-season ==
Unlike before, Star Guitar cut to the chase when it came to winning his first race as a four-year-old. On January 3, 2009 he ran in the Dixie Poker Ace Stakes. At the start he settled in on the rail for the majority of race staying in third but dropping back to fourth but back to third being four lengths behind at the final turn. But soon ran by everyone to win by a comformatle length. After that, one potential idea of his handlers was for a graded stakes race that was unrestricted. However, before he could do that he took another win in the Premier Night Championship Stakes by seven lengths. Next were a pair of graded stakes attempts in the New Orleans Handicap and the Alysheba Stakes. Both were failures with third and seventh-place finishes. Soon after he ran in the Pola Benoit Memorial Stakes in which he stayed in second for most of the race and then took over the lead in the stretch and cantered home. In his next start, Star Guitar won the Louisiana Cup Turf Classic Stakes. Two weeks later he won the Evangeline Handicap. The colt's next move was the Gold Cup Stakes at Delta Downs in which he was given top weight of 125 pounds. At the start he was seventh and second to last. Soon he covered ground and took over the lead by a length and at the finish opened up to a two-length victory at the wire. Following his big winning streak he then made one last race before the year ended. It was the Louisiana Champions Day Classic Stakes. At the start of the race Star Guitar settled in on the rail and at the far turn opened up five lengths which opened up to seven and 3/4 lengths. With all of these wins in one year Star Guitar was awarded his first Louisiana-bred Horse of the Year and Champion Older Horse.

== Five-year-old-season ==
Star Guitar began the 2010 racing season with a repeat win in the Premier Night Championship Stakes. His first big winning streak ended when he finished fourth in the New Orleans Handicap and in the Texas Mile. Following that he never returned to graded stakes race competition again. After that he won the Evangeline Handicap and the Louisiana Showcase Classic. Returning to compete Delta Downs Gold Cup, he finished in fourth place. Following his defeat he returned to the winner's circle in the Louisiana Champions Day Classic Stakes. For the most part he was in second place before taking over the lead at the turn and winning by 1/4 length.

== Six and seven-year-old-season ==
Following his five year old season Star Guitar never lost again in his career. Some of his best highlights included his third and fourth wins in the Premier Night Championship Stakes, as well as his third career win in the Evangeline Handicap. After winning nine races in a row he was about to finish his career with one final race, the Louisiana Legends Classic Stakes. Starting off he settled back in third, but he began to slip back to forth. By the far turn he began to come back being only two lengths behind. Finally he galloped away winning by 3/4 of a length and breaking the track record at the time.

== Post racing career ==
After racing he went to become a sire at Clear Creek stud. He has been able to produce winning foals such as millionaire Touchuponastar and black type winners Givemeaminit, Testing One Two and Grade 2 Honorable Miss Stakes winner Mintit to Stardom.

In 2013 Star Guitar was inducted into the Fair Grounds Racing Hall of Fame.
