= Ronald Ardoin =

American jockey (born 1957)

Ron Ardoin
Personal information
- Born: June 13, 1957 (age 69) Carencro, Louisiana; United States
- Occupation: Jockey

Horse racing career
- Sport: Horse racing
- Career wins: 5226

Major racing wins
- Red Bank Handicap (1977); Louisiana Downs Handicap (1981); Mardi Gras Stakes (1981, 1983, 1994, 1995); Cornhusker Handicap (1993); Black Gold Stakes (1994); Arkansas Derby (1996); New Orleans Handicap (1996); Lone Star Oaks (2001)

Racing awards
- Fair Grounds Leading Jockey (1982, 1986, 1993, 1994, 1995, 1996)

Honors
- Fair Grounds Racing Hall of Fame (1996); Lone Star Park Hall of Fame (2007)
- Updated on October 7, 2008

Ronald D. Ardoin (born June 13, 1957 in Carencro, Louisiana) is a retired jockey in American Thoroughbred horse racing. He is one of a number of successful Cajun jockeys who began their careers riding in bush track races in Louisiana.

In 1973, at Delta Downs in Vinton, Louisiana, Ron Ardoin earned the first of his 5226 career wins. During his thirty-one years in racing he won twelve riding titles at Louisiana tracks, earning six at the Fair Grounds Race Course in New Orleans and another six at Louisiana Downs in Bossier City. Ardoin also won a riding title at Lone Star Park in Grand Prairie, Texas. At Oaklawn Park Race Track in Hot Springs, Arkansas, he scored the most significant win of his career when he rode Zarb's Magic to victory in the 1996 Arkansas Derby. That win led to riding Zarb's Magic to a thirteenth-place result in the 1996 Kentucky Derby. In his only other Derby start, he finished tenth aboard Encolure in the 1985 edition.

On August 20, 2000, Ron Ardoin became the 16th jockey in North America to win 5,000 races when he rode Heart of an Angel to victory at Louisiana Downs.

Ron Ardoin was inducted in the Fair Grounds Racing Hall of Fame in 1998 and the Lone Star Park Hall of Fame in 2007.

After an injury in March 2003 kept him out of racing, Ardoin officially retired in early 2004 having won 5226 races and having won six riding title at Fair Grounds Race Course.

A resident of Haughton, Louisiana, Ardoin currently works as a jockey's agent based at Louisiana Downs.
