= Louisiana Stakes =

- Class: Grade III
- Location: Fair Grounds Race Course; New Orleans, Louisiana, United States
- Inaugurated: 1942 (as Louisiana Handicap)
- Race type: Thoroughbred - Flat racing
- Website: www.fairgroundsracecourse.com

Race information
- Distance: 1 1/16 miles (8.5 furlongs)
- Surface: Dirt
- Track: left-handed
- Qualification: Four-years-old & up
- Weight: Assigned
- Purse: $150,000 (2022)

The Louisiana Stakes is a Grade III American Thoroughbred horse race for horses aged four years and older over a distance 1 1/16 miles on the dirt track held annually during the third week of January at Fair Grounds Race Course in New Orleans, Louisiana.

== History ==
Inaugurated on December 12, 1942, the first running of the Louisiana Handicap was won by Calumet Farm's 1941 U.S. Triple Crown winner Whirlaway. It would be the last race of Whirlaway's brilliant career and he was voted his second straight American Horse of the Year title.

Since inception, the Louisiana Handicap has been run at two different distances:

- 1 1/16 miles : 1947, 1952–present
- 1 1/8 miles : 1942–1943, 1945–1946, 1949–1951

The event was not held in 1944, 1948, 2005 and 2006.

The event was renamed to the Louisiana Stakes in 2016.

In 2020 the event was upgraded to Grade III.

== Records ==
Speed record: (at current distance of 1 1/16 miles)

- 1:42.40 - Soy Numero Uno (1977)

Most wins:

- 3 - Tenacious (1958, 1959, 1960)

== Winners ==
| Year | Winner | Age | Jockey | Trainer | Owner | Time |
|---|---|---|---|---|---|---|
| 2026 | Accelerize | 4 | Flavien Prat | Todd A. Pletcher | Spendthrift Farm LLC and Repole Stable | 1:43.43 |
| 2025 | Hit Show | 5 | Florent Geroux | Brad Cox | Wathnan Racing (Tamim bin Hamad Al Thani) | 1:44.91 |
| 2024 | Saudi Crown | 4 | Florent Geroux | Brad Cox | FMQ Stables (Faisal Al Qahtani) | 1:43.20 |
| 2023 | Happy American | 5 | James Graham | Neil Pessin | Lothenbach Stables, Inc. (Robert J. Lothenbach) | 1:45.33 |
| 2022 | Mandaloun | 4 | Florent Geroux | Brad Cox | Juddmonte | 1:42.52 |
| 2020 | Blended Citizen (Note: Blended Citizen finished second but was awarded first place purse winnings after the original winner Silver Dust was disqualified for testing positive.) | 5 | Florent Geroux | Brad Cox | Sayjay Racing, G. Hall & B. Hubbard | 1:43.29 |
| 2019 | Harlan Punch | 6 | Florent Geroux | Brad Cox | Front Row Racing, Ten Strike Racing, K. McReynolds & B. Miller | 1:45.05 |
| 2018 | Cedartown | 4 | Joe Bravo | Michael Stidham | Godolphin | 1:44.18 |
| 2017 | Hawaakom | 7 | Miguel Mena | Wesley E. Hawley | Stephan H. Smoot & Wesley E. Hawley | 1:44.01 |
| 2016 | International Star | 4 | Miguel Mena | Michael J. Maker | Kenneth and Sarah Ramsey | 1:44.44 |
| 2015 | Hard Aces | 5 | Jose Riquelme | J. Larry Jones | Dreamchaser Thorobreds (Managing partners: Jeffrey Faulk & Michael Jay Cavanah) | 1:44.61 |
| 2014 | Fordubai | 4 | Robby Albarado | Greg Geier | Jim Tafel | 1:43.37 |
| 2013 | Infrattini | 5 | Miguel Mena | Paul McGee | Z Thoroughbreds (founder & Managing Partner: Steve Zerda) | 1:44.62 |
| 2012 | Thiskyhasnolimit | 5 | Shane Sellers | Steven Asmussen | Cathy & Robert Zollars / Mark Wagner | 1:43.67 |
| 2011 | Recapturetheglory | 6 | Jamie Theriot | Louie Roussel III | Louie Roussel III & Ronnie Lamarque | 1:43.41 |
| 2010 | Friesan Fire | 4 | Shaun Bridgmohan | Steve Asmussen | Vinery Stables & Fox Hill Farm (Richard C. "Rick" Porter II) | 1:43.39 |
| 2009 | Good And Lucky | 6 | Pat Valenzuela | Josie Carroll | James & Alice Sapara | 1:43.46 |
| 2008 | Silver Lord | 5 | Corey Lanerie | Steve Asmussen | Bowman Couch Racing | 1:43.61 |
| 2007 | Sandburr | 8 | James Graham | Michael Stidham | Feel The Thunder Stable (Marty Nixon) | 1:45.10 |
| 2004 | Gigawatt | 4 | Brian J. Hernandez | Steve Flint | Steve Ramsey | 1:43.58 |
| 2003 | Spanish Empire | 4 | Eddie Martin, Jr. | Steve Asmussen | Jubilee Stable, et al. | 1:43.58 |
| 2002 | Connected | 5 | Larry Melancon | David M. Carroll | Alexander & Groves Revocable Trust | 1:44.82 |
| 2001 | San Pedro | 4 | Ray Sibille | Joseph E. Broussard | Richard F. Rudolph | 1:44.77 |
| 2000 | Guided Tour | 4 | Larry Melancon | Niall M. O'Callaghan | Morton Fink | 1:44.00 |
| 1999 | Neon Shadow | 5 | Willie Martinez | Ray Tamargo | Ray Tamargo | 1:43.60 |
| 1998 | Take Note of Me | 4 | Ray Sibille | Gene Cilio | Barry Shipp & Steve Holland | 1:43.60 |
| 1997 | Scott's Scoundrel | 5 | E. J. Perrodin | Paul Pellerin | Virgil Huskey | 1:44.00 |
| 1996 | Buck's Nephew | 6 | Randy Romero | P. Noel Hickey | Irish Acres Farm (P. Noel & Margaret "Bobby" Hickey) | 1:45.00 |
| 1995 | Buck's Nephew | 5 | Robby Albarado | P. Noel Hickey | Irish Acres Farm (P. Noel & Margaret "Bobby" Hickey) | 1:43.80 |
| 1994 | Fappiano's Star | 6 | Willie Martinez | Joseph O. Duhon | Melissa Meche | 1:44.00 |
| 1993 | Far Out Wadleigh | 5 | E. J. Perrodin | Ray Frederick | Wadleigh/Latino Racing Stable | 1:44.60 |
| 1992 | Erica's Dream | 4 | Kenny Bourque | Bobby C. Barnett | John A. Franks | 1:44.20 |
| 1991 | Majesty's Imp | 5 | Bobby Walker, Jr. | Sturgis Ducoing | Batarasan Stable (Chuck Tanner, Rick Rhoden, Bob Skinner) | 1:47.60 |
| 1990 | Festive | 5 | Shane Romero | Thomas M. Amoss | John A. Franks | 1:45.80 |
| 1989 | The Flips Comin | 4 | Joe Judice | Sam Parise | Barbara A. Allen | 1:44.40 |
| 1988 | Under Orders | 6 | Shane Romero | Louie Roussel III | Louie Roussel III | 1:45.40 |
| 1987 | Royal Strength | 4 | Charles Woods Jr. | Donald Winfrey | James Devaney | 1:48.60 |
| 1986 | Hopeful Word | 5 | Pat Day | Carl Bowman | Barrett M. Morris | 1:45.20 |
| 1985 | Silent King | 4 | Ronnie Franklin | Bud Delp | Hawksworth Farm (Harry & Teresa Meyerhoff) | 1:43.20 |
| 1984 | Explosive Bid | 6 | Charles Woods Jr. | Bud Delp | Hawksworth Farm (Harry & Teresa Meyerhoff) | 1:44.80 |
| 1983 | Listcapade | 4 | E. J. Perrodin | Dewey Smith | Dorothy Dorsett Brown | 1:44.00 |
| 1982 | Aspro | 4 | Bobby Walker, Jr. | Bud Delp | James A. Bayard | 1:44.40 |
| 1981 | Sun Catcher | 4 | Alonzo Guajardo | Dianne Carpenter | Sundance Stable | 1:43.20 |
| 1980 | A Letter To Harry | 6 | Randy Romero | John T. Oxley | Estate Raymond F. Salmen | 1:45.20 |
| 1979 | Dr. Riddick | 5 | Larry J. Durousseau | Frank L. Brothers | Albert M. Stall Jr. | 1:45.40 |
| 1978 | Prince Majestic | 4 | Eddie Delahoussaye | Dewey Smith | Dorothy Dorsett Brown | 1:44.80 |
| 1977 | Soy Numero Uno | 4 | Ray Broussard | Homer C. Pardue | Joseph R. Straus & Izzy Proler | 1:42.40 |
| 1976 | Master Derby | 4 | Craig Perret | Smiley Adams | Golden Chance Farm (Robert E. Lehmann) | 1:43.20 |
| 1975 | Hearts of Lettuce | 5 | Allen LeBlanc | Louie Roussel III | Robert Azar | 1:43.40 |
| 1974 | Tom Tulle | 4 | Craig Perret | Jere R. Smith | W. Arthur Lofton | 1:43.40 |
| 1973 | Guitar Player (DH) | 5 | Phil Rubbicco | Jack Van Berg | M.H. Van Berg Stable Inc. | 1:45.20 |
| 1973 | List (DH) | 5 | Jimmy Nichols | Alcee Richard | Dorothy Dorsett Brown | 1:45.20 |
| 1972 | List | 4 | Jimmy Nichols | Alcee Richard | Dorothy Dorsett Brown | 1:44.40 |
| 1971 | Bon Bon | 4 | Nelson Menard | W. R. Harp | Clover S Farm | 1:43.60 |
| 1970 | Etony | 5 | Phil Rubbicco | George Geier | Gray & Schmieds | 1:44.40 |
| 1969 | Irish Dude | 5 | Sandino Hernandez | Jack M. Bradley | Richard W. Taylor | 1:45.00 |
| 1968 | Diplomat Way | 4 | Leroy Moyers | John O. Meaux | Harvey Peltier | 1:43.80 |
| 1967 | Florida Value | 4 | Richard Winant | John Dupuy | H. S. Cohoon | 1:43.80 |
| 1966 | Blue Murder | 6 | Robert L. Baird | Sam Parise | R. V. Stockton | 1:44.80 |
| 1965 | Charolero | 6 | Glynn Bernis | John O. Meaux | T. Allie Grissom | 1:48.20 |
| 1964 | Shoot Luke | 4 | Dennis Ward | Odie Clelland | Mrs. J. M. Branham | 1:46.60 |
| 1963 | Hoop Bound | 6 | William Skuse | Clifford Scott | Mrs. Clifford Scott | 1:45.40 |
| 1962 | Orleans Doge | 4 | William Skuse | William J. Resseguet | W. J. Resseguet & Ben Weiner | 1:45.80 |
| 1961 | Road House | 4 | Sandino Hernandez | Joseph H. Pierce, Jr | Wilson & Allen | 1:46.40 |
| 1960 | Tenacious | 6 | Ray Broussard | John B. Theall | Dorothy Dorsett Brown | 1:44.80 |
| 1959 | Tenacious | 5 | Ray Broussard | John B. Theall | Dorothy Dorsett Brown | 1:45.20 |
| 1958 | Tenacious | 4 | Ray Broussard | John B. Theall | Dorothy Dorsett Brown | 1:44.00 |
| 1957 | Speed Rouser | 5 | Johnny Heckmann | Harold C. Hoffman | Dr. Sidney H. Babbitz | 1:46.20 |
| 1956 | Ja Ja | 4 | Ralph Borgemenke | Larry H. Thompson | Alamode Stable (Modie J. Spiegel) | 1:48.60 |

== Earlier winners ==
- 1955 - Epic King
- 1954 - Roedna
- 1953 - Spur On
- 1952 - Light Broom
- 1951 - Thelma Berger
- 1950 - Roseborough
- 1949 - Grand Entry
- 1947 - Dockstader
- 1946 - Flareback
- 1945 - South Dakota
- 1943 - First Fiddle
- 1942 - Whirlaway

== See also ==
List of American and Canadian Graded races

- The 2009 Louisiana Handicap at ESPN
