= Thomas M. Amoss =

American horse trainer

Tom Amoss
Personal information
- Born: November 17, 1961 (age 64) New Orleans, Louisiana, United States
- Occupation: Trainer

Horse racing career
- Sport: Horse racing
- Career wins: 4,000 (ongoing)

Major racing wins
- Louisiana Handicap (1990); New Orleans Handicap (1990, 1992); Cornhusker Handicap (1993); Black Gold Stakes (1994, 1996); Diana Stakes (1999); Ballerina Handicap (2020); Lecomte Stakes (1999, 2010); Natalma Stakes (1999); Shakertown Stakes (1999, 2003); Apple Blossom Handicap (2000); Azeri Stakes (2000, 2001); Fleur de Lis Handicap (2000); Go For Wand Handicap (2000); La Troienne Stakes (2000); Prestonwood Distaff Handicap (2000); Stars and Stripes Turf Handicap (2000); Elkhorn Stakes (2001); Safely Kept Stakes (2002); Maker's Mark Mile Stakes (2003); Nijinsky Stakes (2006); Opening Verse Handicap (2006); Aristides Breeders' Cup Stakes (2008); Sunland Derby (2008); Sanford Stakes (2009); Kentucky Oaks (2019)

Honours
- Fair Grounds Racing Hall of Fame (1999)

Significant horses
- Backtalk, Heritage Of Gold

Thomas M. "Tom" Amoss (born November 17, 1961, in New Orleans, Louisiana) is a trainer of Thoroughbred race horses.

A graduate of Louisiana State University with a degree in marketing and a member of Sigma Nu fraternity, Tom Amoss had worked with horses while in high school and after completing his education went to work for trainers Frank Brothers, Larry Robideaux and John Parisella. In 1987 he got his trainer's license and set out on his own. He has won nine leading trainer titles. He won his 4,000th race in 2022 at Saratoga.

Amoss has also served as racing analyst for TVG and ESPN sports television.

In 1998, Tom Amoss was inducted into the Fair Grounds Hall of Fame.

In 2019, he won the Kentucky Oaks with Serengeti Empress.

Amoss was awarded in December 2020 with the Big Sport of Turfdom Award, which recognizes individuals or groups who enhance coverage of thoroughbred racing through cooperation with the media and racing publicists.
