= Tenacious (horse) =

American-bred Thoroughbred racehorse

- Sire: Challedon
- Grandsire: Challenger II
- Dam: Dorothy B. Jr.
- Damsire: Brown King
- Sex: Stallion
- Foaled: 1954
- Country: United States
- Color: Chestnut
- Breeder: Dorothy Dorsett Brown
- Owner: Dorothy Dorsett Brown
- Trainer: John B. Theall
- Record: 112: 20-16-17
- Earnings: US$261,770

Major wins
- Thanksgiving Handicap (1957); A. B. Letellier Memorial Handicap (1958, 1960); Louisiana Handicap (1958, 1959, 1960); New Orleans Handicap (1958, 1959); Pelleteri Handicap (1958); Lecomte Handicap (1959, 1960, 1961)

Honors
- Tenacious Handicap at Fair Grounds; Fair Grounds Racing Hall of Fame (1971)

Tenacious (1954–1967) was an American Thoroughbred racehorse who was one of the most popular ever to compete in New Orleans, Louisiana. In 1966, Fair Grounds Race Course inaugurated the Tenacious Handicap in his honor and on his death in 1967, a memorial plaque was installed in the track's infield and following its creation in 1971, he was inducted in the Fair Grounds Hall of Fame.

Tenacious was bred and raced by Dorothy Dorsett Brown, wife of Joe W. Brown, a prominent Louisiana oilman and owner of the Horseshoe Club Casino in Las Vegas, Nevada. Out of the mare Dorothy B. Jr., Tenacious was sired by Challedon, the 1939 American Horse of the Year and U.S. Racing Hall of Fame inductee.

Trained by John Theall, for the majority of his important wins Tenacious was by ridden by Cajun jockey Ray Broussard. The horse competed for six years during which time he was a three-time winner of both the Louisiana Handicap and the Lecomte Handicap. Among his other accomplishments, Tenacious won back-to-back editions of the New Orleans Handicap.

Retired from racing after the 1962 season, Tenacious sired only a limited number of foals before he died unexpectedly on December 17, 1967, at Spendthrift Farm in Lexington, Kentucky.
