= Lecomte Stakes =

- Class: Grade III
- Location: Fair Grounds Race Course; New Orleans, Louisiana
- Inaugurated: 1943 (as LeCompte Handicap)
- Race type: Thoroughbred – Flat racing
- Website: Fair Grounds

Race information
- Distance: 1 1/16 miles
- Surface: Dirt
- Track: left-handed
- Qualification: Three-year-olds
- Weight: 122 lbs
- Purse: US$250,000 (since 2025)
- Bonuses: Qualifications points – Road to the Kentucky Derby

The Lecomte Stakes is a Grade III American Thoroughbred horse race for three-year-old horses at a distance of one and one-sixteenths miles on the dirt run annually in mid-January, at Fair Grounds Race Course in New Orleans, Louisiana. The event currently offers a purse of $250,000.

== History ==
=== Early years – Open era (1943–61) ===
The event was inaugurated February 20, 1943, as the LeCompte Handicap with handicap conditions for four-year-olds and older over a distance of one and one-eighth miles. The race was won by Emerson Francis Woodward's Valdina Farms standout Valdina Orphan who started a short priced 2/5 odds-on favorite winning easily by two lengths in a time of 1:51 flat. Three months later Emerson Francis Woodward and his wife Bessie were killed in an accident with a train at a graded crossing in his home state of Texas.

The event was named after the town of Lecompte, Louisiana, which was named but incorrectly spelt after a famous 19th century race horse owned by the Wells family who lived on a plantation south of the town. The horse's name was Lecomte, who is known as the only horse to defeat Lexington. Lecomte's dam was the brilliant Reel.

The event was programmed as a preparatory race for the Fair Grounds signature event for older horses, the New Orleans Handicap which in the era was scheduled one or two weeks after this race with the place getters receiving automatic entry.

In 1945 the event was not held due to World War II. In 1948 the eight-year-old Jack S. L. became the first two-time winner of the event. In 1949 the result of the event was a dead heat between My Request and Caillou Rouge. My Request won and would go on and win the New Orleans Handicap. In 1951 Joe W. Brown's four-year-old filly won the event Thelma Berger as part of his two horse entry in event with Riverlane and to date remains the only filly or mare to have won the event. The 1953 winner Smoke Screen also won the New Orleans Handicap.

In 1955 the event was run as the LeComte Handicap with reference to the correct name of the famous horse.

In 1961 one of Fair Grounds' favorite horses Mrs. Joe W. Brown's Tenacious won the event for the third straight time. In 1958 Tenacious finished third as the 11/10 favorite to the two-time winner Speed Rouser, but would go on and win the New Orleans Handicap. In 1959 Tenacious set a new track record of 1:43 flat for the 1 1/16 miles distance. The 1961 running of the event would be the last time the race was scheduled as an event for older horses.

=== Three-year-old event (1962 onwards) ===
In 1962 the conditions of the event were changed that only three-year-olds could enter. The event immediately became a preparatory race for the Louisiana Derby which was held later in the meeting in March. The 1963 winner City Line won the event defeating Lemon Twist by five lengths and setting a new stakes record of 1:42 2/5. City Line would go on and repeat his win in his next start defeating Lemon Twist again by eight lengths in the Louisiana Derby. Mrs. Dorothy Dorsett Brown's two horse entry of Dapper Delegate and Doc Wesley won the event in 1965 starting at the short odds of 1/2. Dapper Delegate would also go on and in a fortnight capture the Louisiana Derby.

The first winner of the LeComte Handicap to make an impact on the American Triple Crown events was Joseph R. Straus's 1972 winner No Le Hace. No Le Hace started as the 6/5 favorite and won by 2 1/2 lengths winning his third straight race. No Le Hace would win the Louisiana Derby and the go to Oaklawn Park and win the Arkansas Derby. No Le Hace proceeded in running second at Churchill Downs in the Derby Trial Stakes a week before the Kentucky Derby. In the 1972 Kentucky Derby No Le Hace finished second to Riva Ridge and two weeks later finished second in the 1972 Preakness Stakes at Pimlico to Bee Bee Bee.

A major upset occurred in the 1988 running of the event when Thomas Leavell's Pastourelles defeated the heavily backed 3/10 odds-favorite Risen Star by a length and a quarter. Risen Star would turn the tables on Pastourelles in the Louisiana Derby Trial Stakes and Louisiana Derby. More impressive was Risen Star's campaign in the American Triple Crown events where he won 1988 Preakness Stakes and then the Belmont Stakes by 14 1/2 lengths.

In 1991 the distance of the event was decreased to one mile.

In 2003 the American Graded Stakes Committee classified the event as Grade III.

Due to the catastrophic damage caused by of Hurricane Katrina in 2005 the winter meeting was abbreviated and held at Louisiana Downs and the event was not scheduled.

The event was held over a distance of a mile and 40 yards in 2010 and 2011 and was increased to a mile and 70 yards in 2012.

In 2013 Oxbow won the event by a stakes record 11 1/2 lengths. Later in May Oxbow won the 2013 Preakness Stakes at Pimlico. The 2019 winner War of Will also went onto win the 2019 Preakness Stakes.

In 2020 the event's distance was set to the 1 1/16 miles distance, last run in 1991.

The event is part of the Road to the Kentucky Derby.

== Records ==
Speed record:

- 1 1/16 miles: 1:42.40 – City Line (1963)
- 1 mile & 70 yards: 1:42.57 – Vicar's in Trouble (2014)
- 1 mile & 40 yards: 1:39.29 – Fly Cry (1994)
- 1 mile: 1:37.60 – Dixieland Heat (1993)

Margins:

- 11 1/2 lengths – Oxbow (2013)

Most wins by a jockey:

- 5 – Robby Albarado (1998, 2001, 2005, 2012, 2017)

Most wins by a trainer:

- 5 – John B. Theall (1946, 1951, 1959, 1960, 1961)

Most wins by an owner:

- 3 – Mr. & Mrs. Joe W. Brown (1951, 1959, 1960, 1961, 1965, 1967)

Lecomte Stakes – Louisiana Derby double:

- City Line (1963), Dapper Delegate (1965), No Le Hace (1972), Clev Er Tell (1977), Dixieland Heat (1993), Friesan Fire (2009), International Star (2015)

== Winners ==
Year	Winner	Age	Jockey	Trainer	Owner	Distance	Time	Purse	Grade	Ref
Lecomte Stakes
2026	Golden Tempo	3	José Ortiz	Cherie DeVaux	Phipps Stable & St. Elias Stable	1 1/16 miles	1:44.98	$250,000	III	
2025	Disco Time	3	Florent Geroux	Brad H. Cox	Juddmonte Farms	1 1/16 miles	1:47.07	$250,000	III	
2024	Track Phantom	3	Joel Rosario	Steven M. Asmussen	L and N Racing, Clark O. Brewster, Jerry Caroom & Breeze Easy	1 1/16 miles	1:44.73	$194,000	III	
2023	Instant Coffee	3	Luis Saez	Brad H. Cox	Gold Square	1 1/16 miles	1:45.12	$194,000	III	
2022	Call Me Midnight	3	James Graham	J. Keith Desormeaux	Peter L. Cantrell	1 1/16 miles	1:44.36	$200,000	III	
2021	Midnight Bourbon	3	Joseph Talamo	Steven M. Asmussen	Winchell Thoroughbreds	1 1/16 miles	1:44:41	$200,000	III	
2020	Enforceable	3	Julien R. Leparoux	Mark E. Casse	John C. Oxley	1 1/16 miles	1:43.72	$200,000	III	
2019	War of Will	3	Tyler Gaffalione	Mark E. Casse	Gary Barber	1 mile & 70 yards	1:43.44	$200,000	III	
2018	Instilled Regard	3	Javier Castellano	Jerry Hollendorfer	OXO Equine	1 mile & 70 yards	1:42.59	$200,000	III	
2017	Guest Suite	3	Robby Albarado	Neil J. Howard	William S. Farish III & Lora Jean Kilroy	1 mile & 70 yards	1:43.20	$200,000	III	
2016	Mo Tom	3	Corey J. Lanerie	Thomas M. Amoss	G M B Racing	1 mile & 70 yards	1:43.18	$200,000	III	
2015	International Star	3	Miguel Mena	Michael J. Maker	Kenneth and Sarah Ramsey	1 mile & 70 yards	1:43.62	$200,000	III	
2014	Vicar's in Trouble	3	Rosie Napravnik	Michael J. Maker	Kenneth and Sarah Ramsey	1 mile & 70 yards	1:42.57	$200,000	III	
2013	Oxbow	3	Jon Court	D. Wayne Lukas	Bluegrass Hall	1 mile & 70 yards	1:43.30	$200,000	III	
2012	Mr. Bowling	3	Robby Albarado	J. Larry Jones	Brereton Jones	1 mile & 70 yards	1:43.49	$175,000	III	
2011	Wilkinson	3	Garrett K. Gomez	Neil J. Howard	Gaillardia Racing	1 mile & 40 yards	1:40.97	$96,000	III	
2010	Ron the Greek	3	James Graham	Thomas M. Amoss	Jack T. Hammer	1 mile & 40 yards	1:40.09	$100,000	III	
2009	Friesan Fire	3	Gabriel Saez	J. Larry Jones	Fox Hill Farms & Vinery Stables	1 mile	1:37.67	$100,000	III	
2008	Z Fortune	3	Shaun Bridgmohan	Steven M. Asmussen	Zayat Stables	1 mile	1:37.79	$99,000	III	
2007	Hard Spun	3	Mario G. Pino	J. Larry Jones	Fox Hill Farms	1 mile	1:37.87	$98,000	III	
2006	Race not held									
2005	Storm Surge	3	Robby Albarado	Dallas Stewart	Overbrook Farm	1 mile	1:39.34	$100,000	III	
2004	Fire Slam	3	Shane Sellers	David M. Carroll	Stan E. Fulton	1 mile	1:38.48	$100,000	III	
2003	Saintly Look	3	Shane Sellers	Dallas Stewart	William A. Carl	1 mile	1:37.62	$100,000	III	
2002	Easyfromthegitgo	3	Donnie Meche	Steven M. Asmussen	James Cassels & Bob Zollars	1 mile	1:37.98	$100,000	Listed	
2001	Sam Lord's Castle	3	Robby Albarado	Josie Carroll	Eugene & Laura Melnyk	1 mile	1:37.98	$100,000	Listed	
Lecomte Handicap
2000	Noble Ruler	3	Larry Melancon	Niall M. O'Callaghan	Fsim Racing Stables	1 mile	1:39.11	$100,000	Listed	
1999	Some Actor	3	Eddie Martin Jr.	Thomas M. Amoss	James McIngvale	1 mile	1:38.59	$100,000	Listed	
1998	Western City	3	Robby Albarado	D. Wayne Lukas	Overbrook Farm	1 mile	1:37.84	$100,000	Listed	
1997	Cash Deposit	3	Ronald D. Ardoin	Daniel J. Vella	Frank H. Stronach	1 mile	1:37.97	$60,000	Listed	
1996	Boomerang	3	Eddie Martin Jr.	James E. Baker	Peter J.Callahan & Catesby W. Clay	1 mile	1:39.49	$43,075		
1995	Moonlight Dancer	3	Larry Melancon	Michael H. Daggett	Andrea S. Pollack	1 mile & 40 yards	1:40.13	$42,875		
1994	Fly Cry	3	Ronald D. Ardoin	Thomas M. Amoss	Al Prats & Bryan Wagner	1 mile & 40 yards	1:39.29	$33,174		
1993	Dixieland Heat	3	Elvis J. Perrodin	Gerald J. Romero	Leland Cook	1 mile	1:37.60	$33,325		
1992	Line in the Sand	3	Shane P. Romero	Neil J. Howard	William S. Farish III	1 mile	1:39.80	$32,027		
1991	Big Courage	3	Tammy Lee Fox	William I. Fox Sr.	Patricia Fox	1 1/16 miles	1:48.30	$32,875		
1990	Martha's Buck	3	Bobby J. Walker Jr.	William I. Fox Sr.	William Tinney	1 1/16 miles	1:47.00	$26,750		
1989	Majesty's Imp	3	Steve R. Rydowski	Sturges J. Ducoing	Bata Rasan Stable	1 1/16 miles	1:45.60	$27,425		
1988	Pastourelles	3	Bobby J. Walker Jr.	Carl Bowman	Thomas Leavell	1 1/16 miles	1:46.60	$27,725		
1987	One Tough Cat	3	Kirk Paul LeBlanc	Edward J. Virgadamo	Magnolia Racing Stable	1 1/16 miles	1:48.20	$28,750		
1986	Timely Albert	3	Phil Rubbicco	Louie J. Roussel III	Louie J. Roussel III	1 1/16 miles	1:45.60	$50,200		
1985	Encolure	3	Ronald D. Ardoin	Tommie T. Morgan	Mrs. Margaret Porter	1 1/16 miles	1:45.80	$53,500		
1984	§ Silent King	3	Charles Mueller	Bud Delp	Hawksworth Farm	1 1/16 miles	1:45.20	$60,150		
1983	Explosive Wagon	3	Charles Mueller	Gene C. Norman	Peggy McReynolds	1 1/16 miles	1:45.00	$42,900		
1982	Linkage	3	Gregory P. Smith	Henry S. Clark II	Christiana Stables	1 1/16 miles	1:45.00	$40,000		
1981	Law Me	3	James McKnight	Ted McClain	Edwin Whittaker	1 1/16 miles	1:46.40	$40,800		
1980	§ Withholding	3	Bryan Fann	Ronnie G. Warren	Mr. & Mrs. Russell Michaels Jr.	1 1/16 miles	1:44.20	$39,650		
1979	Fuego Seguro	3	Michael R. Morgan	Billy S. Borders	Joseph R. Straus & Izzy Proler	1 1/16 miles	1:46.60	$34,675		
1978	§ Dragon Tamer	3	Ray Sibille	William I. Fox Sr.	Patricia Fox & William Bailey	1 1/16 miles	1:44.60	$35,500		
1977	Clev Er Tell	3	Ray Broussard	Homer C. Pardue	Joseph R. Straus & Izzy Proler	1 1/16 miles	1:44.80	$27,925		
1976	Tudor Tambourine	3	David Copling	King Stauzy Allen Jr.	Mrs. Henry D. Paxson	1 1/16 miles	1:46.20	$29,450		
1975	Colonel Power	3	Phil Rubbicco	John O. Meaux	Harvey Peltier	1 mile & 40 yards	1:40.60	$29,875		
1974	Crimson Ruler	3	Kenneth LeBlanc	Carroll J. Matherne	Lee Matherne	1 1/16 miles	1:43.80	$28,900		
1973	Vodika	3	Tommy Barrow	Forrest H. Kaelin	Frank Palermo & Charles Nedeff	1 1/16 miles	1:46.00	$24,825		
1972	No Le Hace	3	Phil Rubbicco	Homer C. Pardue	Joseph R. Straus	1 1/16 miles	1:44.40	$23,900		
1971	§ Helio Rise	3	Phil Rubbicco	David F. Erb	Roger W. & Roger T. Wilson Jr.	1 1/16 miles	1:45.00	$18,700		
1970	§ Action Getter	3	Mike Venezia	Robert G. Dunham	E. V. (Tony) Benjamin III & J. M. Jones Jr.	1 1/16 miles	1:44.20	$19,250		
1969	Foolish Prince	3	David E. Whited	John Oxley	Albert H. & Albert M. Stall	1 1/16 miles	1:45.80	$17,375		
1968	Port Digger	3	Martinez Heath	Jack A. Lohman	Daniel W. Myers	1 1/16 miles	1:46.80	$18,025		
1967	Grand Premiere	3	James Combest	Alcee J. Richard	Mrs. Joe W. Brown	1 1/16 miles	1:44.60	$18,350		
1966	Sails Pride	3	Leroy Moyers	J. M. Hart	Edward J. Grosfield	1 1/16 miles	1:50.60	$13,325		
1965	§ Dapper Delegate	3	Johnny Heckman	Alcee J. Richard	Mrs. Joe W. Brown	1 1/16 miles	1:43.40	$9,675		
1964	Susan's Gent	3	Robert L. Baird	John O. Meaux	T. Allie Grissom	1 1/16 miles	1:45.20	$12,725		
1963	City Line	3	Robert L. Baird	John O. Meaux	T. Allie Grissom	1 1/16 miles	1:42.40	$12,450		
1962	Treasury Note	3	William Phelps	Henry Forrest	J. C. Pollard	1 1/16 miles	1:46.40	$12,900		
1961	Tenacious	7	Clarence Meaux	John B. Theall	Mrs. Joe W. Brown	1 1/16 miles	1:45.00	$12,075		
1960	Tenacious	6	Ray Broussard	John B. Theall	Mrs. Joe W. Brown	1 1/16 miles	1:48.40	$12,175		
1959	Tenacious	5	Ray Broussard	John B. Theall	Mrs. Joe W. Brown	1 1/16 miles	1:43.00	$12,275		
1958	Speed Rouser	6	Alfred Popara	Howard C. Hoffman	Sidney & Hannah Babbitz	1 1/16 miles	1:45.40	$12,450		
1957	Speed Rouser	5	Johnny Heckman	Howard C. Hoffman	Sidney & Hannah Babbitz	1 1/16 miles	1:46.60	$12,800		
1956	Galdar	5	Earl Van Hook	Edward M. Obrien	C. L. Dupuy	1 1/16 miles	1:44.00	$13,725		
1955	Spur On	7	Paul J. Bailey	M. A. Silagy Jr.	Marvin E. Affeld	1 1/16 miles	1:44.40	$14,275		
Lecompte Handicap
1954	§ Futuresque	7	Evans Jenkins	R. E. Harper	Red Head Stable	1 1/16 miles	1:45.60	$13,750		
1953	Smoke Screen	4	Gerald Porch	Frank Sanders	Reverie Knoll Farms	1 1/16 miles	1:47.80	$13,350		
1952	False	4	Earl Van Hook	John D. Mikel	Mrs. Nellie M. Mikel	1 1/16 miles	1:45.60	$11,550		
1951	§ƒ Thelma Berger	4	Kevin Stuart	John B. Theall	Joe W. Brown	1 1/16 miles	1:45.80	$12,850		
1950	John's Joy	5	Don Scurlock	Monte D. Parke	John A. Kinard Jr.	1 1/16 miles	1:45.20	$12,120		
1949	§ My Request	4	Jerry West	James P. Conway	Ben F. Whitaker	1 1/8 miles	1:50.80	$11,180		Dead heat
1949	Caillou Rouge	4	Don Scurlock	Peter J. Valenti	Peter J. Valenti	1 1/8 miles	1:50.80	$11,180		Dead heat
1948	Jack S. L.	8	Robert L. Baird	John O. Ravannack	Mrs. John S. Letellier	1 1/16 miles	1:45.20	$10,000		
1947	Jack S. L.	7	Steven Brooks	John O. Ravannack	Mrs. John S. Letellier	1 1/16 miles	1:45.20	$10,000		
1946	King Dorsett	4	Charles LeBlanc	John B. Theall	John B. Theall	1 mile & 70 yards	1:44.60	$5,000		
1945	Race not held									
1944	First Fiddle	5	Jack Westrope	Edward L. Mulrenan	Mrs. Edward L. Mulrenan	1 mile & 70 yards	1:45.60	$3,515		
1943	Valdina Orphan	4	Ferrill Zufelt	Frank Catrone	Valdina Farms	1 1/8 miles	1:51:00	$5,050		

Notes:
§ Ran as an entry
ƒ Filly or Mare

== See also ==
- Road to the Kentucky Derby
- List of American and Canadian Graded races
