= Ray Broussard =

American jockey (1937–1993)

Personal information
- Born: August 11, 1937 Abbeville, Louisiana, United States
- Died: October 6, 1993 (aged 56) Bossier City, Louisiana
- Occupation: Jockey

Horse racing career
- Sport: Horse racing

Major racing wins
- Aqueduct Handicap (1953); Selima Stakes (1954, 1955); Carter Handicap (1955, 1963, 1977); Beldame Stakes (1956); Frizette Stakes (1958); Louisiana Handicap (1958, 1959, 1960, 1977); New Orleans Handicap (1958, 1959, 1961, 1964); Saranac Stakes (1958); Wood Memorial Stakes (1959); Lecomte Handicap (1959, 1960, 1977); Louisiana Derby (1959, 1962, 1966, 1977); Alcibiades Stakes (1960); Belmont Futurity Stakes (1960); Excelsior Handicap (1960); Fashion Stakes (1960, 1970); Jamaica Handicap (1960); Massachusetts Handicap (1960); Fayette Stakes (1961); Monmouth Oaks (1961); Distaff Handicap (1961); Maskette Stakes (1961); Arlington Handicap (1962); Canadian International Stakes (1962); Jockey Club Cup Handicap (1962); Sapling Stakes (1962, 1967); Equipoise Handicap (1964); Hawthorne Gold Cup Handicap (1964); Manhattan Handicap (1964); Coaching Club American Oaks (1965); Great American Stakes (1966, 1967, 1968); Juvenile Stakes (1966); New York Stakes (1967, 1972); Haskell Invitational Handicap (1969); Lamplighter Stakes (1969); Ashland Stakes (1970); Flamingo Stakes (1970); Florida Derby (1970); Round Table Handicap (1971); Phoenix Stakes (1972); Pucker Up Stakes (1972); Delaware Handicap (1975); Memorial Day Handicap (1976); Arkansas Derby (1977); Oaklawn Handicap (1977)

Honours
- Fair Grounds Racing Hall of Fame; Greater New Orleans Sports Hall of Fame (1983)

Significant horses
- Admiral's Voyage, Bobby Brocato, Deceit, High Voltage, Marshua, Politely, Susan's Girl, Tenacious

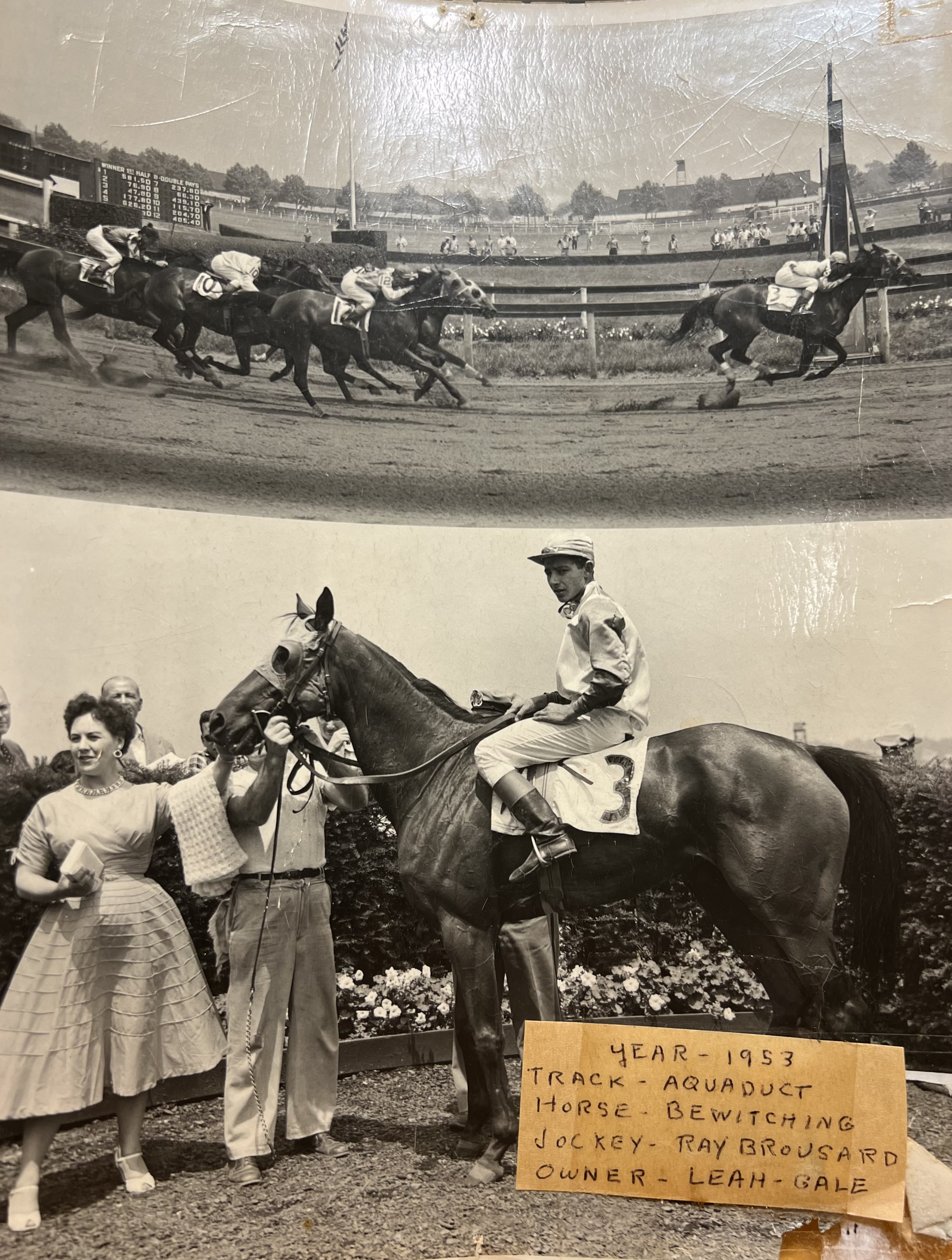
Number 3 "Bewitching" winning race at Aqueduct 1953

Raywood Joseph "Ray" Broussard (August 11, 1937 - October 6, 1993) was an American jockey in the sport of Thoroughbred horse racing.

"Ray" Broussard was born in Vermilion Parish, Louisiana, home to many Acadians and an area that would produce a number of other Cajun jockeys including Eddie Delahoussaye, Randy Romero, Shane Sellers, and Ray Sibille.

Like all jockeys from the Bayou country, Broussard began riding at unregulated local Bush tracks. His skills led to a career as a professional jockey, becoming a leading rider at Fair Grounds Race Course in New Orleans who would induct him in their Hall of Fame. Broussard won important stakes races at a number of American racetracks in Florida, Illinois, Kentucky, New Jersey, New York as well as in Toronto, Canada.

In the late 1950s, Ray Broussard was the principal rider for the noted Louisiana stable owners Joe and Dorothy Brown, most notably aboard their colt Tenacious with whom he won back-to-back editions of the Louisiana and New Orleans Handicaps in 1958 and 1959. Broussard also competed in all three of the U.S. Triple Crown races. His best results came in 1970 when, after winning the Flamingo Stakes and Florida Derby aboard the colt, My Dad George, he finished second in both the Kentucky Derby and the Preakness Stakes.

Following his retirement from racing, Broussard made his home in Abbeville, Louisiana. In 1983 he was inducted in the Greater New Orleans Sports Hall of Fame. After a long illness, he died in 1993 in Bossier City, Louisiana at age fifty-six. His four wins in the New Orleans Handicap is a record that through 2009 has not been equaled.
