= Larry Melancon =

American jockey (1955–2021)

Personal information
- Born: August 7, 1955 Breaux Bridge, Louisiana, United States
- Died: March 25, 2021 (aged 65) Louisville, Kentucky, United States
- Occupation: Jockey

Horse racing career
- Sport: Horse racing
- Career wins: 2,857

Major racing wins
- Arlington-Washington Lassie Stakes (1972); Fair Grounds Oaks (1972); Lexington Handicap (1977); Louisville Handicap (1977); Ben Ali Handicap (1982); Edgewood Stakes (1984, 2000, 2001, 2003); Blue Grass Stakes (1986); Oklahoma Derby (1994); Round Table Stakes (1994); Calder Derby (1995); Pennsylvania Derby (1995); Lone Star Park Handicap (1997); Rebel Stakes (1997); New Orleans Handicap (1998); Black Gold Stakes (2000); Louisiana Handicap (2000, 2002); Mardi Gras Stakes (2000, 2001); Arlington Matron Stakes (2001); Hillsborough Stakes (2001); Stephen Foster Handicap (2001); Kentucky Cup Classic Stakes (2001); Washington Park Handicap (2001); Lexington Stakes (2001); Regret Stakes (2001); San Antonio Handicap (2001); Delaware Oaks (2002); Colonel E.R. Bradley Handicap (2002); Mineshaft Handicap (2005); American Derby (2006); Kentucky Cup Distaff Stakes (2005); Gardenia Handicap (1990, 2007, 2009); Phoenix Stakes (2007)

Racing awards
- United States Champion Apprentice Jockey by wins (1972)

Significant horses
- Gallant Bob, Guided Tour, My Charmer, Phantom On Tour, Wanderin Boy
- Updated on 31 March 2021

Larry J. Melancon (August 7, 1955 – 25 March 2021) was an American jockey in Thoroughbred horse racing who rode primarily on the Kentucky-Arkansas circuit.

Melancon (pronounced Ma-lawn-son) was born in Breaux Bridge, Louisiana. He began racing horses at age nine at local bush tracks and at age sixteen obtained his jockeys license. He rode his first winner on September 28, 1971, at Jefferson Downs Race Track in the New Orleans suburb of Kenner, Louisiana. The following year he won one hundred and eighty two races, the most of any apprentice jockey in the United States.

During his long career, Larry Melancon won numerous Graded stakes races and of his four appearances in the Kentucky Derby, his top result was a fourth in the 1976 edition aboard Amano.

Melancon retired from riding in 2010 having won 2,857 races and more than $60 million in purses. He died in Louisville, Kentucky.
