= Black Gold Stakes =

- Class: Non-Listed Black Type
- Location: Fair Grounds Race Course; New Orleans, Louisiana, USA
- Inaugurated: 1958
- Race type: Thoroughbred - Flat racing

Race information
- Distance: 1 mile (8 furlongs)
- Surface: Turf
- Track: Left-handed
- Qualification: Three-year-olds
- Weight: Allowance
- Purse: $60,000

The Black Gold Stakes at Fair Grounds Race Course in New Orleans, Louisiana is a race on turf for three-year-old Thoroughbred horses. First run in 1958, the race is named in honor of the 1924 Kentucky Derby winner and U. S. Racing Hall of Fame stallion Black Gold. It is tradition that the winning jockey of the race places flowers on the horse's grave in the infield.

== Historical notes ==
Through 1978 the race was open to horses age three and older.

Run on turf in 1998, 2000-2004, 2008-2009, 2012-2016, 2018. Scheduled to run on turf in 1999 and 2005 though 2007 but weather conditions can affect the safety of the turf and as such each of the races was switched to the dirt track .

In 2006, the Black Gold Stakes was run at Louisiana Downs in Bossier City, Louisiana.

=== Race distances ===
- 6 F : 1958-1997, 2011
- 5.5 F : 1998-2000, 2007-2010
- 7.5 F : 2001-2004, 2012-2013, 2015-2016
- 8 F (1 mile) : 2005, 2018
- 8.32 F (1 mile, 70 yards) : 2006

== Records ==
Speed record: (at most frequent distance of 6 furlongs)

- 1:09.40 - Smoke Glacken (1997)

Most wins:

- 3 - Honey Jay (1972, 1973, 1974)

Most wins by a jockey:

- 4 - Robby Albarado (2005, 2006, 2007, 2016)

Most wins by a trainer:

- 4 - Jack Van Berg (1965, 1966, 1967, 1971)

Most wins by an owner:

- 4 - Marion Van Berg (1965, 1966, 1967, 1971)

== Winners ==
Year	Winner	Age	Jockey	Trainer	Owner	Dist.	Time	Purse U.S.$
2018	Dragon Drew	3	James Graham	William B. Bradley	William B. Bradley	8 F (±)	1:37.55	$60,000
2017	Race not held							
2016	Oscar Nominated	3	Robby Albarado	Michael J. Maker	Ken and Sarah Ramsey	7.5 F (±)	1:29.63	$60,000
2015	Tuba	3	Jose Riquelme	Anne P. Smith	Windy Hill Farm	7.5 F (±)	1:30.66	$60,000
2014	Race not held							
2013	Up With The Birds	3	Shaun Bridgmohan	Malcolm Pierce	Sam-Son Farm	7.5 F (±)	1:35.84	$75,000
2012	Icon Ike	3	Rosie Napravnik	J. Larry Jones	Mr. & Mrs. Fletcher Gray	7.5 F (±)	1:32.85	$75,000
2011	Trubs	3	Jesse Campbell	Albert Stall Jr.	Claiborne Farm	6 F	1:11.18	$60,000
2010	Royal Express	3	James Graham	Joseph E. Broussard	Richard F. Rudolph	5.5 F	1:04.38	$60,000
2009	Turfiste	3	Jamie Theriot	Robert E. Holthus	Walts David Stable LLC	5.5 F (±)	1:04.58	$60,000
2008	Amazing Results	3	Julien Leparoux	Richard R. Scherer	Team Block	5.5 F (±)	1:06.12	$60,000
2007	Probation Ready	3	Robby Albarado	Steve Asmussen	Vinery Stables	5.5 F	1:05.86	$75,000
2006	Kingsfield	3	Robby Albarado	Thad Keller	Brass Ring Partnership	8.32 F	1:45.64	$80,875
2005	Straw Hat	3	Robby Albarado	Neil J. Howard	Farish/Hudson/Elkins	8 F	1:39.30	$50,000
2004	Shiloh Bound	3	Jose Riquelme	Walter Binder Jr.	Twin Lanterns Racing Stables	7.5 F	1:32.51	$60,000
2003	Prince Alphie	3	Shane Sellers	Josie Carroll	William Schettine	7.5 F	1:36.25	$75,000
2002	Private Emblem	3	Donnie Meche	Steve Asmussen	James Cassels/Bob Zollars	7.5 F	1:31.45	$75,000
2001	Rahy's Secret	3	Coby Bourque	Corale A. Richards	Keith Plaisance	7.5 F (±)	1:31.71	$75,000
2000	Blushing Irish	3	Larry Melancon	Henry S. Cochran	Lucky Seven Stable	5.5 F (±)	1:05.09	$75,000
1999	Show Me The Stage	3	Ricky Courville	Eric J. Guillot	B. Cain/T. LeBlanc/E. Guillot	5.5 F	1:03.70	$50,000
1998	Captain Maestri	3	Eddie Martin Jr.	Louie J. Roussel III	Louie J. Roussel III	5.5 F (±)	1:05.63	$50,000
1997	Smoke Glacken	3	Craig Perret	Henry L. Carroll	A. Karkenny/R. P. Levy/W. Roberts	6 F	1:09.40	$40,000
1996	Palikar	3	Willie Martinez	Thomas M. Amoss	John Steinmetz	6 F	1:10.22	$40,000
1995	I'M Lucky	3	Eddie Martin Jr.	Paul J. McGee	Kilmarnock Stable	6 F	1:11.69	$40,000
1994	Fly Cry	3	Ronald Ardoin	Thomas M. Amoss	Prats & Wagner	6 F	1:10.40	$30,000
1993	Premier Cheer	3	Carlos Silva	Bobby C. Barnett	John A. Franks	6 F	1:11.60	$30,000
1992	Fighting K	3	Corey Lanerie	Guilliam Dronet	Exalton Broussard	6 F	1:12.80	$30,000
1991	Brother Meme	3	V. L. Smith	Dino Huy	Dino Huy	6 F	1:12.80	$30,000
1990	Jamie Boy	3	Carl J. Woodley	Larry Robideaux Jr.	Craig Ent. Inc.	6 F	1:11.40	$25,000
1989	Marfa Missile	3	Calvin Borel	Cecil Borel	O. E. Wood Jr.	6 F	1:12.00	$20,000
1988	Latchburn	3	Tracy Hebert	George L. Arceneaux	R. Taylor, et al	6 F	1:11.00	$20,000
1987	Wayne's Crane	3	Don Howard	Steve Chiasson	K. J. DiPalma	6 F	1:14.20	$25,000
1986	New Plymouth	3	Terry Sonnier	Guilliam Dronet	Exalton Broussard/Saul Schexnider	6 F	1:11.40	$25,000
1985	Don't Hesitate	3	Julio C. Espinosa	Donald R. Winfree	James J. DeVaney	6 F	1:11.00	$25,000
1984	Taylor's Special	3	Randy Romero	William I. Mott	William F. Lucas	6 F	1:11.60	$25,000
1983	Pronto Forli	3	Bobby J. Walker Jr.	Billy S. Borders	Joseph R. Straus	6 F	1:11.00	$25,000
1982	Linkage	3	Greg P. Smith	Henry S. Clark	Christiana Stables	6 F	1:10.60	$25,000
1981	Honor King	3	Anthony Agnello	Louis G. Marshall	John A. Franks	6 F	1:12.00	$25,000
1980	Sun Catcher	3	Angelo Trosclair	Dianne Carpenter	Sundance Stable/David Nedeff	6 F	1:11.20	$25,000
1979	Income Tax	3	Eddie Delahoussaye	Frank L. Brothers	Albert Stall, Sr./Jack Van Berg	6 F	1:11.00	$25,000
1978	Dragon Tamer DH	3	Ray Sibille	William I. Fox, Sr.	Patsy Fox & Bill Bailey	6 F	1:10.20	$25,000
1978	Schottis DH	3	Daryl Montoya	Richard Coit	Miriam Harthill	6 F	1:11.00	$25,000
1977	Tudor Tambourine	4	Angelo Trosclair	Joseph E. Broussard	Charles Cohen & Ruth Fertel	6 F	1:10.20	$20,000
1976	Colonel Power	4	Phil Rubbicco	John O. Meaux	Harvey Peltier	6 F	1:10.20	$20,000
1975	Full Swing	8	Angelo Trosclair	Carroll J. Matherne	Carroll J. Matherne	6 F	1:09.80	$20,000
1974	Honey Jay	6	Julio C. Espinoza	Smiley Adams	Robert E. Lehmann	6 F	1:11.40	$17,500
1973	Honey Jay	5	Phil Rubbicco	Ike K. Mourar	Robert E. Lehmann	6 F	1:11.40	$15,000
1972	Honey Jay	4	Phil Rubbicco	Ike K. Mourar	Robert E. Lehmann	6 F	1:11.00	$15,000
1971	Assumption	6	Leroy Moyers	Jack Van Berg	M. H. Van Berg Stable	6 F	1:10.40	$15,000
1970	Tudor Scott	4	Robert Baird	Sam Parise	Sam Parise/S. C. Gray	6 F	1:11.00	$15,000
1969	Port Digger	4	Martinez Heath	Jack A. Lohman	Daniel W. Myers	6 F	1:12.80	$12,500
1968	Cabildo	5	Jimmy Combest	Alcee J. Richard	Dorothy D. Brown	6 F	1:10.00	$12,500
1967	Mike's Red	5	Joe Lopez	Jack Van Berg	M. H. Van Berg Stable	6 F	1:10.40	$10,000
1966	Mike's Red	4	Larry Snyder	Jack Van Berg	Marion H. Van Berg	6 F	1:14.00	$7,500
1965	Herb Scott	6	Larry Snyder	Jack Van Berg	Marion H. Van Berg	6 F	1:14.00	$7,500
1964	Wait There	5	Darrell Madden	William Hinphy	Mrs. William Hinphy	6 F	1:14.00	$7,500
1963	Hoop Bound	6	William Skuse	Clifford Scott	Mrs. Clifford Scott	6 F	1:10.60	$7,500
1962	Eight Again	5	William M. Cook	Vester R. Wright	T. Alie Grissom	6 F	1:11.80	$10,000
1961	Race not held							
1960	Mary's Potential	3	Clarence Meaux	John B. Theall	Dorothy D. Brown	6 F	1:12.20	$10,000
1959	Charlie Boy	4	William Skuse	Edward J. Legere	William W. Carroll	6 F	1:12.60	$10,000
1958	Gay Vista	8	William Phelps	Charles C. Calvin	Triple C Stable	6 F	1:10.60	$10,000
