= Fair Grounds Racing Hall of Fame =

Coordinates: 29.9820°N 90.0784°W

The Fair Grounds Racing Hall of Fame was created in 1971 by the Fair Grounds Race Course in New Orleans, Louisiana, to honor the horses and people who have played a significant part in the history of the racecourse.

== Inductees ==
| Name | Inducted | Position |
|---|---|---|
| Frank "Buddy" Abadie | 2000 | industry official |
| Robby Albarado | 2005 | jockey |
| A Letter to Harry | 1992 | horse |
| Thomas M. Amoss | 1999 | trainer |
| Eddie Arcaro | 1971 | jockey |
| Ronald Ardoin | 1996 | jockey |
| Steve Asmussen | 2011 | trainer |
| Robert L. Baird | 1975 | jockey |
| Bobby C. Barnett | 2000 | trainer |
| Angel Barrera | 1994 | trainer |
| W. Hal Bishop | 1971 | owner |
| Black Gold | 1971 | horse |
| Eric Wolfston Blind | NA | track official |
| Blushing K. D. | 2001 | horse |
| Edward R. Bradley | 1971 | owner, breeder |
| Frank L. Brothers | 1992 | trainer |
| Joseph E. Broussard | 2004 | trainer |
| Ray Broussard | NA | jockey |
| Joe W. & Dorothy D. Brown | 1974 | owners |
| Cabildo | 1995 | horse |
| John Blanks Campbell | 1971 | track official |
| Chou Croute | 2001 | horse |
| John Francis Clark Jr. | 2001 | owner, industry executive |
| Colonel Power | 1992 | horse |
| Concern | 2004 | horse |
| William Cottrill | 1999 | owner |
| Davona Dale | 2003 | horse |
| Pat Day | 1992 | jockey |
| Jack DeFee | 1992 | industry executive |
| Eddie Delahoussaye | 1991 | jockey |
| Grover G. "Bud" Delp | 2002 | trainer |
| Diplomat Way | 1974 | horse |
| Dixie Poker Ace | 1997 | horse |
| Joseph P. Dorignac Jr. | 1992 | breeder, track executive, shareholder |
| Joseph P. Dorignac III | 2002 | trainer, track shareholder |
| Francis Dunne | 2003 | track official |
| Larry J. Durousseau | 2013 | jockey |
| Henry Forrest | 1999 | trainer |
| John A. Franks | 1992 | owner, breeder |
| Furl Sail | 2000 | horse |
| Mack Garner | 1971 | jockey |
| Edward H. Garrison | 1971 | jockey |
| Grindstone | 2000 | horse |
| T. Alie Grissom | 1991 | owner, breeder |
| Eric Guerin | 1991 | jockey |
| Abe Hawkins | 1997 | jockey |
| John Heckmann | 1998 | jockey |
| William G. Helis Sr. | 1991 | owner, breeder, track owner |
| Norman "Butsy" Hernandez | 2004 | owner |
| Samuel C. Hildreth | 1971 | trainer |
| Neil J. Howard | 2005 | trainer |
| Ben A. Jones | 1971 | trainer |
| Duncan F. Kenner | 1971 | owner, breeder, industry executive |
| Marie G. Krantz | 2003 | owner, breeder, track executive |
| Sylvester W. Labrot Jr. | 2002 | owner, breeder, track executive |
| Allen "Black Cat" Lacombe | 1991 | handicapper, track executive |
| Lane's End Farm | 2004 | owner, breeder |
| John S. Letellier | 1971 | track owner, executive |
| Lexington | 1971 | horse |
| Jack Lohman | 1998 | owner, breeder, industry executive |
| Johnny Longden | 1995 | jockey |
| Lecomte | 1971 | horse |
| Marriage | 1971 | horse |
| John G. Masoni | 1999 | track owner |
| Master Derby | 1992 | horse |
| Claude Mauberret Jr. | 2002 | veterinarian, industry executive |
| John O. Meaux | 1996 | trainer |
| Mike's Red | 1994 | horse |
| Mineshaft | 2005 | horse |
| Monarchist | 1971 | horse |
| Monique Rene | 1999 | horse |
| J. D. Mooney | 1999 | jockey |
| Gardere F. Moore | NA | track executive |
| William I. Mott | 1997 | trainer |
| Mervin H. Muniz Jr. | 2001 | track official, executive |
| Joseph A. Murphy | 1971 | track official, executive |
| James D. Nichols | 1993 | jockey |
| No Le Hace | 1993 | horse |
| Winfield O'Connor | 1999 | jockey |
| John Kenneth "Jack" O'Hara | 1993 | turf writer, book author, track announcer |
| Pan Zareta | 1971 | horse |
| Homer C. Pardue | 2000 | trainer |
| Peace Rules | 2011 | horse |
| Anthony Pelleteri | 1971 | trainer, track executive |
| Harvey Peltier Sr. | 1994 | owner, breeder |
| Craig Perret | 1994 | jockey |
| Elvis J. Perrodin | 2013 | jockey |
| Princequillo | 2005 | horse |
| Quatrain | 1971 | horse |
| Rachel Alexandra | 2011 | horse |
| Reel | 2001 | horse |
| Risen Star | 1991 | horse |
| Reyn Rogers | 2017 | industry executive |
| Randy Romero | 1992 | jockey |
| Raymond F. Salmen | 2013 | jockey |
| Louie J. Roussel III | NA | owner, trainer, track owner |
| Earl Sande | 1971 | jockey |
| Clifford Scott | 1996 | trainer |
| Tommy Scott | 1997 | trainer, track official |
| Scott's Scoundrel | 2002 | horse |
| William L. Shoemaker | 1971 | jockey |
| Silverbulletday | 2002 | horse |
| Tod Sloan | NA | jockey |
| Dewey P. Smith | 1997 | trainer |
| Larry Snyder | 1999 | jockey |
| Spanish Play | 2002 | horse |
| Albert M. Stall Sr. | 1995 | owner, industry executive |
| Star Guitar | 2013 | horse |
| Joseph R. Straus Sr. | 1998 | owner, breeder |
| Taylor's Special | 1998 | horse |
| Tenacious | 1971 | horse |
| Richard Ten Broeck | 2000 | owner, track owner |
| Tiffany Lass | 1991 | horse |
| Tippity Witchet | 1971 | horse |
| Harry E. Trotsek | NA | trainer |
| Jack Van Berg | 1991 | owner, trainer |
| Marion Van Berg | 1971 | owner, trainer |
| C. W. "Cracker" Walker | 1992 | trainer |
| Thomas Jefferson Wells | 2000 | owner, breeder |
| Whirlaway | 1991 | horse |
| David E. Whited | 2001 | jockey, trainer, owner |
| Roger W. Wilson | 2001 | owner |
| Vester R. Wright | 1991 | trainer |
| Yorktown | 1996 | horse |
| Anthony L. Zuppardo | 2003 | owner |
