= Robert L. Baird =

American jockey and trainer

Personal information
- Born: November 17, 1920 New Waverly, Texas
- Died: December 16, 2005 (aged 85) Elk Grove Village, Illinois
- Occupation: Jockey

Horse racing career
- Sport: Horse racing
- Career wins: 3,749

Major racing wins
- Arlington Classic (1948); Arlington Handicap (1948); Equipoise Mile (1948); LeComte Handicap (1948, 1963, 1964); Lafayette Stakes (1949, 1951); Louisville Handicap (1949); Bashford Manor Stakes (1950, 1956); Hyde Park Stakes (1950); Joliet Stakes (1950); Cinderella Stakes (1952); Thanksgiving Handicap (1953, 1969); Sugar Bowl Stakes (1955, 1970); Blue Grass Stakes (1956); Louisiana Derby (1956, 1963); King Cotton Handicap (1958); Alcibiades Stakes (1962); Arkansas Derby (1962); Ashland Stakes (1962); Falls City Handicap (1962); Ohio Derby (1962); Louisiana Stakes (1966); Louisiana Futurity (1968); Oaklawn Handicap (1969); Pan Zareta Stakes (1969); Black Gold Stakes (1970); Apple Blossom Handicap (1972); Pelleteri Handicap (1956, 1958, 1964, 1972); Laurance Armour Handicap (1978)

Honors
- Fair Grounds Racing Hall of Fame (1975)

Significant horses
- Abrogate, Areopolis, Papa Redbird, Primonetta, Star Reward
- Updated on 5 January 2022

Robert Lee Baird (November 17, 1920 - December 16, 2005) was an American jockey and trainer in Thoroughbred horse racing and a decorated soldier who served with General Patton's Third Army in World War II with which he landed on Utah Beach on D Day.

Robert Lee Baird was often referred to as "Bobby" and usually recorded in racing sheets as R. L. Baird. His career began in 1937 but would be interrupted for three and a half years of wartime military service during which he was awarded four Purple Hearts. It ended with his retirement in 1982 with 3,749 career wins. For the final three years in racing, Baird worked as a trainer and then as an agent for his son, jockey Edward Thomas Baird who was often recorded as E. T. Baird.

Baird rode in the Kentucky Derby five times, the last coming in 1978 which made the then fifty-seven-year-old the oldest jockey ever to compete in the first leg of the U. S. Triple Crown series. Also in that race was sixteen-year-old Steve Cauthen, the youngest jockey to ever ride in the Kentucky Derby who became its youngest winner aboard Affirmed.

In 1975 Baird was inducted into the Fair Grounds Racing Hall of Fame.
