= John G. Dooley =

Horse racing announcer

John G. Dooley (born December 21, 1965) is a North American track announcer of Thoroughbred horse racing. Dooley has two positions in the industry as the "voice" of Twin Spires' Fair Grounds Race Course & Slots in New Orleans, Louisiana from November until March, and at Caesars Entertainment's Horseshoe Indianapolis near Shelbyville, Indiana from April until November.

== Early life and education ==
A native of Staten Island, Dooley grew up attending New York Racing Association (NYRA) tracks Belmont Park, Aqueduct Racetrack and in the summers, at Saratoga Race Course with his parents, John C. and Mary Anne Dooley.

When he was in high school he would sneak out of class and go to the off-track betting parlor, he told Mede Nix of the Fort Worth Star-Telegram in an interview in March 1997. Dooley said, "I'd go there not so much to gamble but to listen to the race calls. I enjoyed hearing someone who could whip a crowd staring at a speaker into a frenzy. So by the time I was in high school, I set my sights on becoming a track announcer."

He graduated from St. John's University in 1987. While in college, he worked part time in during the 1985 to 1986 season for the New York Slapshots, a minor league hockey team as a publicist, team statistician and announcer at home games in Newark, New Jersey.

Dooley took several internships in the publicity office at Monmouth Park, the Meadowlands Racetrack in New Jersey and also at NYRA.

== Career ==
Dooley's first position was a publicity director at Philadelphia Park and where he made his first call in 1989 as a fill-in. His first job as an announcer came in 1991 at Jack Thistledown Racino outside of Cleveland, Ohio where he worked with Steve Sexton. He would spend the next six seasons at the track.

In 1996, Dooley returned to NYRA as the assistant track announcer under Tom Durkin where he stayed for a year. He then moved on to take a new position as the announcer for Lone Star Park in Grand Prairie, Texas during their inaugural season in 1997 when he was re-united with Steve Sexton and Corey Johnsen. At the time, Mike Ross of the Fort Worth Star-Telegram stated Dooley's "crisp, accurate and enthusiastic delivery should be a perfect compliment for the excitement of Fort Worth's inaugural season". He stayed at Lone Star until 1999.

Dooley then was considered a finalist to become the track announcer at all three Chicago area racetracks, which included Arlington Park, Sportsman's Park and Hawthorne Race Course. According to an article compiled by Mark Shapiro of the Chicago Tribune, "Arlington and Sportsman's are negotiating with Hawthorne to make him [Dooley] the announcer at all three tracks.

In the end, Dooley relocated to become the track announcer of Arlington Park in 2000. He held that position until 2021 when he called the final race at the Chicago landmark on September 25, 2021. Arlington Park's property was sold to the Chicago Bears by Churchill Downs Inc.

During the winter months when the Arlington racing was in its off-season, Dooley joined the staff at Fair Grounds Race Course & Slots in New Orleans, Louisiana as the track announcer in 2004, creating a circuit between Fair Grounds and Arlington for the past 18 years.

As of 2023, Dooley has two positions in the industry as the "voice" of Twin Spires' Fair Grounds Race Course & Slots from November until March, and at Caesars Entertainment's Horseshoe Indianapolis near Shelbyville, Indiana from April until November, which he started in early 2022.

=== Notable calls ===
While at Thistledown in 1992, Dooley was quoted by several newspapers when Rare Discovery began losing ground stating, "He's dropping out it as quickly as Ross Perot."
