= Bush track =

Bush track is a term used in horse racing to describe tracks used for unsanctioned, informal horse races run in rural areas of the United States and southern Canada. Quarter horses, ridden by amateur jockeys, are raced on makeshift tracks, often set up in the field where the horses are pastured using barrels or other natural landmarks as the track interior. Race times are never kept and the track length is not uniform.

Some of these tracks are somewhat more formal, with names and a regular following (though seldom more than 1000 would show for a race). Races are often run with only two horses on a track with lanes. The state of Louisiana is notable for having produced top jockeys who got their start in this setting.

== Notable users ==
- Robby Albarado
- Ronald Ardoin
- Calvin Borel
- Ray Broussard
- Eddie Delahoussaye
- Kent Desormeaux
- Laverne Fator
- Mark Fator
- Eric Guerin
- Mark Guidry
- Craig Perret
- Red Pollard
- Randy Romero
- Shane Sellers
- Carroll Shilling
- Joseph Talamo
- Jack Kaenel
- Donald Pettinger
