= Mardi Gras Stakes =

- Class: Black type stakes
- Location: Fair Grounds Race Course; New Orleans, Louisiana
- Inaugurated: 1922
- Race type: Thoroughbred - Flat racing
- Website: www.fairgroundsracecourse.com

Race information
- Distance: About 5 1/2 furlongs
- Surface: Turf
- Track: Left-handed
- Qualification: Fillies & Mares, four years old & up
- Purse: US$75,000

The Mardi Gras Stakes is an American Thoroughbred horse race run annually since 1922 at Fair Grounds Race Course in New Orleans, Louisiana.

Run in February, the race is open to fillies and mares, aged four and up, and run on turf since 2016 at a distance of about 5 1/2 furlongs over the Stall-Wilson Turf Course.

== Winners since 2007 ==
Year	Winner	Age	Jockey	Trainer	Owner	Dist. (Miles)	Time	Purse$
2022	Elle Z	5	Mitchell Murrill	Chris Hartman	M Bar O, LLC	5.5 f ±	1:03.95	$75,000
2021	Elle Z	4	Mitchell Murrill	Chris Hartman	M Bar O, LLC	5.5 f ±	1:03.81	$75,000
2020	Play On	4	Fernando De La Cruz	Brad H. Cox	Klein Racing	5.5 f ±	1:03.99	$75,000
2019	Student Body	5	Miguel Mena	Christopher Davis	Gary Broad	5.5 f ±	1:04.21	$75,000
2018	Compelled	3	Corey Lanerie	Thomas F. Proctor	Glen Hill Farm	5.5 f ±	1:04.32	$75,000
2017	Rapid Rhythm	5	James Graham	Michael Stidham	Robert S. Evans	5.5 f ±	1:03.73	$75,000
2016	Leigh Court	6	Florent Geroux	Michael Stidham	Speedway Stable	5.5 f ±	1:04.39	$60,000
2015	Divine Beauty	4	Kerwin D. Clark	J. Larry Jones	Brereton C. Jones	6 f	1:10.20	$60,000
2014	Cozze Up Lady	5	Rosie Napravnik	W. Bret Calhoun	Martin Racing & Morgan Thoroughbred et al.	5.5 f	1:05.10	$60,000
2013	Good Deed	4	Shaun Bridgmohan	Steve Margolis	Richard, Bertram & Elaine Klein	6 f	1:11.12	$75,000
2012	Daisy Devine	4	James Graham	Andrew McKeever	James M. Miller	1 1/16 m	1:47.19	$60,000
2011	Street Storm	3	Jesse Campbell	Steve Margolis	Right Time Racing LLC	7.5 f	1:43.77	$60,000
2010	Chantilly Nayla	3	James Graham	Neil Pessin	Salman Rashed	5.5 f	1:04.75	$60,000
2009	Selva	3	Robby Albarado	David M. Carroll	Helen C. Alexander & Helen K. Groves	5.5 f	1:04.63	$60,000
2008	Cloudburst	3	Julien Leparoux	Dallas Stewart	Overbrook Farm	5.5 f	1:05.12	$60,000
2007	Corrupt	3	Robby Albarado	Jeff Trosclair	Team Block	7.5 F	1:33.15	$75,000
