= Marion Van Berg =

American racehorse trainer

Personal information
- Born: January 15, 1896 Aurora, Nebraska
- Died: May 3, 1971 (aged 75) Omaha, Nebraska
- Resting place: Columbus Cemetery, Columbus, Nebraska
- Occupation: Racehorse owner and trainer

Horse racing career
- Sport: Horse racing

Major racing wins
- As a Trainer: Arkansas Derby (1960) As an Owner: Arkansas Derby (1960); Black Gold Stakes (1965, 1966, 1967, 1971); Apple Blossom Handicap (1969, 1970)

Honors
- U. S. Racing Hall of Fame (1970); Fair Grounds Racing Hall of Fame (1971)

Marion H. Van Berg (January 15, 1896 – May 3, 1971) was an American Thoroughbred racehorse trainer. He was inducted into the National Museum of Racing and Hall of Fame in 1970. His son Jack Van Berg also went on to become a racehorse trainer.

He died of a heart attack on May 3, 1971, in Omaha, Nebraska at age 75.
