= David Carroll (naturalist) =

American naturalist (born 1942)

David M. Carroll (born 5 January 1942) is an American naturalist, author and illustrator.

He has contributed to endangered species programs in New Hampshire, Vermont, Maine, and has worked with the Environmental Protection Agency, and the National Park Service. He resides in Warner, New Hampshire.

== Awards ==
- 2009 National Book Award Finalist, Nonfiction
- 2006 MacArthur Fellows Program
- 2001 John Burroughs Medal for distinguished nature writing
- Environmental Merit Award from the EPA
- Tudor Richards Award, from NH Audubon Society

== Works ==
- The Year of the Turtle: A Natural History, DIANE Publishing Company, 1999, ISBN 978-0-7881-6534-4
- Trout reflections: a natural history of the trout and its world, St. Martin's Press, 1993, ISBN 978-0-312-09464-5
- Swampwalker's Journal: A Wetlands Year, Houghton Mifflin Harcourt, 2001, ISBN 978-0-618-12737-5
- Self-Portrait with Turtles: A Memoir, Houghton Mifflin Harcourt, 2005, ISBN 978-0-618-56584-9
- Following the Water: A Hydromancer's Notebook, Houghton Mifflin Harcourt, 2009, ISBN 978-0-547-06964-7
