= New Orleans Classic Stakes =

- Class: Grade II
- Location: Fair Grounds Race Course; New Orleans, Louisiana, United States
- Inaugurated: 1924
- Race type: Thoroughbred - Flat racing
- Website: www.fairgroundsracecourse.com

Race information
- Distance: 1 1/8 miles (9 furlongs)
- Surface: Dirt
- Track: left-handed
- Qualification: Four-years-old & up
- Weight: 124 lbs. with allowances
- Purse: $500,000

The New Orleans Classic Stakes is an American Thoroughbred horse race run annually at Fair Grounds Race Course in New Orleans, Louisiana. Open to horses four years old and up, the race is run at a distance of one and one-eighth miles on the dirt. It currently offers a purse of $500,000.

Due to flooding as a result of Hurricane Katrina, the 2006 edition of the New Orleans Handicap was run at Louisiana Downs in Bossier City, Louisiana.

== Historical notes ==
Wild Again, the winner of the first Breeders' Cup Classic, took this race in 1984, and Mineshaft won this race during his 2003 Horse of the Year campaign.

== Records ==
Speed record: (at current distance of 1 1/8 miles)

- 1:46.48 - Touchuponastar (2026)

Most wins:

- 2 - Marriage (1943, 1944)
- 2 - Tenacious (1958, 1959)
- 2 - Honor Medal (1987, 1988)
- 2 - Touchuponastar (2025, 2026)

Most wins by a jockey:

- 4 - Ray Broussard (1958, 1959, 1961, 1964)

Most wins by a trainer:

- 6 - Todd Pletcher (2007, 2008, 2010, 2011, 2013, 2014)

Most wins by an owner:

- 6 - Dorothy Dorsett Brown (1950, 1958, 1959, 1964, 1967, 1983)

== Winners ==
Year	Winner	Age	Jockey	Trainer	Owner	Dist. (Miles)	Time	Purse $	Gr.
2026	Touchuponastar	7	Marcelino Pedroza Jr.	Jeff Delhomme	Set-Hut LLC	1-1/8 m	1:46.84	$500,000	G2
2025	Touchuponastar	6	Timothy Thornton	Jeff Delhomme	Set-Hut LLC (Jake Delhomme)	1-1/8 m	1:48.10	$500,000	G2
2024	Red Route One	4	Joel Rosario	Steven M. Asmussen	Winchell Thoroughbreds LLC	1-1/8 m	1:49.14	$400,000	G2
2023	West Will Power	6	Flavien Prat	Brad Cox	Gary & Mary West	1-1/8 m	1:47.95	$400,000	G2
2022	Olympiad	4	Junior Alvarado	William Mott	Grandview Equine, Cheyenne Stable, LLC and LNJ Foxwoods	1-1/8 m	1:47.74	$400,000	G2
2021	Chess Chief	5	Luis Saez	Dallas Stewart	Estate of James J. Coleman Jr.	1-1/8 m	1:49.24	$400,000	G2
2020	By My Standards	4	Gabriel Saez	Bret Calhoun	Allied Racing Stable	1-1/8 m	1:50.27	$400,000	G2
2019	Core Beliefs	4	Florent Geroux	Peter Eurton	Gary Broad	1-1/8 m	1:51.36	$400,000	G2
2018	Good Samaritan	4	Joel Rosario	William Mott	WinStar Farm	1-1/8 m	1:49.87	$400,000	G2
2017	Honorable Duty	5	James Graham	Brendan Walsh	DARRS Inc. (David A. Ross)	1-1/8 m	1:48.35	$400,000	G2
2016	S'maverlous	6	Jose Lezcano	Michael J. Maker	Gata Racing Stable (John Huber)	1-1/8 m	1:50.06	$400,000	G2
2015	Call Me George	5	James Graham	Grant T. Forster	Clint Joiner, Matt Bond, Jim Curry	1-1/8 m	1:51.07	$396,000	G2
2014	Palace Malice	4	Mike E. Smith	Todd Pletcher	Dogwood Stable	1-1/8 m	1:48.93	$400,000	G2
2013	Graydar	5	Edgar Prado	Todd Pletcher	Twin Creeks Racing Stables LLC (Steve Davison)	1-1/8 m	1:49.16	$400,000	G2
2012	Nates Mineshaft	5	Jesse M. Campbell	Austin K. Smith	Windy Hill Farm (Scott & Pete Reiman)	1-1/8 m	1:47.64	$400,000	G2
2011	Mission Impazible	4	Garrett K. Gomez	Todd Pletcher	Twin Creeks Racing Stables LLC (Steve Davison)	1-1/8 m	1:49.02	$400,000	G2
2010	Battle Plan	5	Javier Castellano	Todd Pletcher	Overbrook Farm	1-1/8 m	1:49.33	$300,000	G2
2009	Macho Again	4	Robby Albarado	Dallas Stewart	West Point Thoroughbreds, Inc. (Terry Finley, CEO)	1-1/8 m	1:50.21	$500,000	G2
2008	Circular Quay	4	Garrett Gomez	Todd A. Pletcher	Michael & Doreen Tabor	1-1/8 m	1:49.80	$500,000	G2
2007	Master Command	5	John Velazquez	Todd Pletcher	Aaron & Marie Jones	1-1/8 m	1:49.89	$500,000	G2
2006	Brass Hat	5	Willie Martinez	William B. Bradley	Fred F. Bradley	1-1/8 m	1:51.35	$435,600	G2
2005	Badge of Silver	5	Jerry Bailey	Robert J. Frankel	Kenneth & Sarah Ramsey	1-1/8 m	1:48.78	$500,000	G2
2004	Peace Rules	4	Jerry Bailey	Robert J. Frankel	Edmund A. Gann	1-1/8 m	1:48.61	$500,000	G2
2003	Mineshaft	4	Robby Albarado	Neil J. Howard	William S. Farish III et al.	1-1/8 m	1:48.92	$500,000	G2
2002	Parade Leader	5	Corey Lanerie	Neil J. Howard	William S. Farish III & E. J. Hudson, Jr.	1-1/8 m	1:50.44	$500,000	G2
2001	Include	4	Jerry Bailey	Bud Delp	Robert E. Meyerhoff	1-1/8 m	1:49.00	$500,000	G2
2000	Allen's Oop	5	Eddie Martin Jr.	Dallas Keen	James D. Jackson	1-1/8 m	1:48.80	$500,000	G3
1999	Precocity	5	Willie Martinez	Bobby C. Barnett	John A. Franks	1-1/8 m	1:49.00	$500,000	G3
1998	Phantom On Tour	4	Larry Melancon	Lynn S. Whiting	W. Cal Partee	1-1/8 m	1:48.13	$500,000	G3
1997	Isitingood	6	David Flores	Bob Baffert	Michael E. Pegram & Terry Henn	1-1/8 m	1:48.40	$300,000	G3
1996	Scotts Scoundrel	4	Ronald Ardoin	Bret Thomas	Virgil Huskey	1-1/8 m	1:49.80	$250,000	G3
1995	Concern	4	Mike E. Smith	Richard W. Small	Robert E. Meyerhoff	1-1/8 m	1:49.40	$200,000	G3
1994	Brother Brown	4	Pat Day	Ron Goodridge	Bowline & Cohrs	1-1/8 m	1:48.80	$200,000	G3
1993	Latin American	5	Garrett Gomez	Robert Marshall	Robert Marshall	1-1/8 m	1:49.20	$150,000	G3
1992	Jarraar	5	Bobby Walker Jr.	Thomas M. Amoss	Sapphire Reg. Stb. & Richard C. Colton Jr.	1-1/8 m	1:48.80	$100,000	G3
1991	Silver Survivor	5	Larry Melancon	Glenn Hild	Carolyn Manning	1-1/8 m	1:50.00	$100,000	G3
1990	Festive	5	Bobby Walker Jr.	Thomas M. Amoss	John A. Franks	1-1/8 m	1:50.40	$100,000	G3
1989	Galba	5	Antonio Castanon	Neil D. Drysdale	Clover Racing Stable (Jamie Schloss, President)	1-1/8 m	1:51.20	$100,000	G2
1988	Honor Medal	7	Pat Day	Neil D. Drysdale	Lettuce Farm	1-1/8 m	1:50.00	$100,000	G2
1987	Honor Medal	6	Russell Baze	Neil D. Drysdale	Lettuce Farm	1-1/8 m	1:52.20	$100,000	G2
1986	Herat	4	Rafael Meza	Jack Van Berg	Jack Van Berg	1-1/4 m	2:01.80	$200,000	G2
1985	Westheimer	4	Larry Snyder	William I. Mott	Michael G. Rutherford	1-1/4 m	2:01.80	$200,000	G2
1984	Wild Again	4	Pat Day	Vincent Timphony	Black Chip Stables (William Allen, Ron Volkman, Terry Beall)	1-1/4 m	2:02.00	$200,000	G2
1983	Listcapade	4	E. J. Perrodin	Dewey Smith	Dorothy D. Brown	1-1/4 m	2:03.20	$200,000	G2
1982	It's The One	5	Walter Guerra	Laz Barrera	Flying Horse Stable & Amin Saiden	1-1/4 m	2:01.80	$200,000	G2
1981	Sun Catcher	4	Alonzo Guajardo	Dianne Carpenter	Sundance Stable (Dianne Carpenter)	1-1/4 m	2:03.40	$150,000	G2
1980	Pool Court	5	Ronald Ardoin	Harry Trotsek	Al Wagner & Ed Seltzer	1-1/4 m	2:04.60	$125,000	G3
1979	A Letter To Harry	5	Ed Delahoussaye	John T. Oxley	Raymond F. Salmen	1-1/4 m	2:02.60	$125,000	G3
1978	Life's Hope	5	Chris McCarron	Laz Barrera	Harbor View Farm	1-1/4 m	2:02.20	$122,500	G3
1977	Tudor Tambourine	4	Angelo Trosclair	Joseph E. Broussard	Charles Cohen & Ruth Fertel	1-1/8 m	1:49.80	$110,000	G3
1976	Master Derby	4	Darrel McHargue	Smiley Adams	Golden Chance Farm (Robert Lehman)	1-1/8 m	1:50.00	$100,000	G3
1975	Lord Rebeau	4	Carlos H. Marquez	William Hightower	Paul Cresci	1-1/8 m	1:50.60	$100,000	G3
1974	Smooth Dancer	4	Larry Adams	John O. Meaux	Harvey Peltier Sr.	1-1/8 m	1:50.60	$75,000	G3
1973	Combat Ready	4	Leroy Moyers	David Erb	Albert Stall Sr.	1-1/8 m	1:51.00	$75,000	G3
1972	Urgent Message	4	Gene St. Leon	Jose A. Martin	Gustave Ring	1-1/8 m	1:49.80	$75,000	
1971	Rio Bravo	5	Fernando Valdizan	Dewey Smith	T. Allie & J. E. Grissom	1-1/8 m	1:48.80	$75,000	
1970	Etony	5	Phil Rubbico	George Geier	Sam Gray & George Schmeideskamp	1-1/8 m	1:49.20	$75,000	
1969	Miracle Hill	5	David E. Whited	Dewey Smith	T. Allie & J. E. Grissom	1-1/8 m	1:54.80	$70,700	
1968	Diplomat Way	4	Leroy Moyers	John O. Meaux	Harvey Peltier Sr.	1-1/8 m	1:49.20	$63,800	
1967	Cabildo	4	Jimmy Combest	Alcee Richard	Dorothy D. Brown	1-1/8 m	1:49.60	$69,100	
1966	Just About	4	Leroy Moyers	Jack M. Bradley	Alice E. Hill	1-1/8 m	1:48.80	$77,000	
1965	Valiant Man	6	Bobby Ussery	Joseph H. Pierce Jr.	Ed & Harry Seltzer	1-1/8 m	1:49.20	$64,000	
1964	Green Hornet	5	Ray Broussard	Alcee Richard	Dorothy Dorsett Brown	1-1/8 m	1:50.20	$61,500	
1963	Endymion	4	Jimmy Nichols	Sylvester Veitch	George D. Widener Jr.	1-1/8 m	1:51.40	$50,000	
1962	Yorktown	5	Jimmy Nichols	Sylvester Veitch	George D. Widener Jr.	1-1/8 m	1:50.60	$50,000	
1961	Greek Star	6	Ray Broussard	Charles V. Reynolds	Sidney M. Barton	1-1/8 m	1:49.80	$58,150	
1960	Tudor Era	7	Robert Stevenson	Arnold N. Winick	Mrs. Herbert Herff	1-1/8 m	1:50.80	$58,900	
1959	Tenacious	5	Ray Broussard	John B. Theall	Dorothy Dorsett Brown	1-1/8 m	1:50.20	$62,500	
1958	Tenacious	4	Ray Broussard	John B. Theall	Dorothy Dorsett Brown	1-1/8 m	1:51.00	$61,900	
1957	Kingmaker	4	Sam Boulmetis Sr.	William C. Winfrey	Happy Hill Farm	1-1/8 m	1:50.20	$60,600	
1956	Find	6	Eric Guerin	William C. Winfrey	Alfred G. Vanderbilt II	1-1/8 m	1:52.40	$63,900	
1955	Sea O' Erin	4	Kenneth Church	Harry Trotsek	Hasty House Farm	1-1/8 m	1:50.20	$62,900	
1954	Grover B	5	Paul J. Bailey	Thomas P. Morgan	Thomas P. Morgan	1-1/8 m	1:52.00	$50,000	
1953	Smoke Screen	6	Gerald Porch	Conn McCreary	Reverie Knoll Farm (Freeman Keys)	1-1/16 m	1:44.00	$50,000	
1952	Oil Capitol	5	Kenneth Church	Harry Trotsek	Hasty House Farm	1-1/16 m	1:44.20	$25,000	
1951	Mount Marcy	6	Kenneth Church	Sylvester Veitch	Cornelius Vanderbilt Whitney	1-1/16 m	1:44.80	$25,000	
1950	Red Camelia	4	Pat Milligan	John B. Theall	Dorothy Dorsett Brown	1-1/16 m	1:49.40	$25,000	
1949	My Request	4	Claude Erickson	James P. Conway	Florence Whitaker	1-1/16 m	1:44.40	$25,000	
1948	Star Reward	4	Steve Brooks	Jack C. Hodgins	Dixiana Stable	1-1/16 m	1:48.80	$25,000	
1947	Earshot	4	Frank S. Moon	Arthur F. Skelton	William G. Helis	1-1/16 m	1:44.80	$25,000	
1946	Hillyer Court	4	Willie Lee Johnson	Ken Force Jr.	Bernard Seroy	1-1/16 m	1:45.20	$25,000	
1945	Race not held								
1944	Marriage	8	Jesse Higley	Rene A. Coward	Rene A. Coward & Carl L. Dupuy	1-1/16 m	1:45.00	$25,000	
1943	Marriage	7	Arthur Craig	Rene A. Coward	Rene A. Coward & Carl L. Dupuy	1-1/16 m	1:43.80	$28,000	
1941	1942	Race not held							
1940	Rough Diamond	8	Arnold Sorsen	Clyde Troutt	Clyde Troutt	1-1/16 m	1:49.20	$1,200	
1939	Chance Sweet	4	Johnny Oros	Eugene Drillon	Eugene Drillon	1-1/16 m	1:46.80	$1,500	
1938	Novelette	3	Vincent Nodarse	Clyde Troutt	Clyde Troutt	1-1/16 m	1:47.00	$2,000	
1937	Skeeter	3	Frank Ritz	Charles S. Bancroft	Charles S. Bancroft	1 m	1:41.80	$1,500	
1936	Julia Grant	4	Homer Spears	Rene A. Coward	Rene A. Coward	1m,70yds	1:47.40	$1,000	
1935	Jesting	5	Sterling Young	Chester J. Bild	Chester J. Bild	1 m	1:39.40	$600	
1934	Slapped	4	Leon "Buddy" Haas	Ben A. Jones	Leonard Wilson	1-1/8 m	1:53.60	$2,000	
1933	Rocky News	5	Johnny Kacala	Joseph F. Patterson	Audley Farm Stable	1-1/16 m	1:52.60	$2,000	
1932	Spanish Play	4	Charles Landolt	Charles H. Knebelkamp	Charles H. Knebelkamp & Richard S. Morris	1-1/8 m	1:54.80	$2,000	
1931	Jimmy Moran	4	Eugene James	Mose Goldblatt	Mose Goldblatt	1-1/16 m	1:45.80	$10,775	
1930	Donnay	4	Eddie Steffen	Frank M. Taylor	Rancocas Stable	1-1/16 m	1:45.20	$12,225	
1929	Vermajo	3	Anthony Pascuma	Charles E. Durnell	Three D's Stock Farm	1-1/16 m	1:46.40	$42,100	
1928	Justice F	4	Anthony Pascuma	Doc Riddle	William Daniel	1-1/16 m	1:45.80	$70,000	
1927	Cotlogomor	5	Charles Allen	Albert G. Woodman	Coventry Stable (S. A. Cowan)	1-1/16 m	1:50.20	$50,000	
1926	Nurmi	3	J. Thomas	Clyde Phillips	Greentree Stable	1-1/16 m	1:47.00	$39,000	
1925	Quatrain	3	Eddie Legere	Thomas J. Harmon	Frederick Johnson	1-1/16 m	1:44.60	$25,000	
1924	Fredericktown	3	Ivan Parke	William H. Fizer	Henry Stark	1 m	1:40.60	$2,000	
