= Fair Grounds Race Course =

Thoroughbred racetrack and casino in New Orleans, United States

- Interactive map of Fair Grounds Race Course
- Location: New Orleans, Louisiana
- Coordinates: 29.983050°N 90.081347°W
- Owned by: Churchill Downs Inc.
- Date opened: 1837
- Course type: Flat/Thoroughbred
- Notable races: Louisiana Derby (G2); New Orleans Handicap (G2); Mervin H. Muniz Jr. Mml Handicap (G2); Fair Grounds Oaks (G2)

Fair Grounds Race Course, often known as New Orleans Fair Grounds, is a thoroughbred racetrack and racino in New Orleans, Louisiana, United States. It is operated by Churchill Downs Louisiana Horseracing Company, LLC.

In 1838 Bernard de Marigny, Julius C Branch and Henry Augustine Tayloe, organized races at the Louisiana Race Course, laid out on Gentilly Road, making this the oldest horseracing site in America still in operation, after Freehold Raceway closed in 2024. Racing began on April 10, 1838, and lasted for five days. In 1852 it was renamed the Union Race Course. In 2009, the Horseplayers Association of North America introduced a rating system for 65 Thoroughbred racetracks in North America. Of the top Fifteen, New Orleans Fair Grounds was ranked #12, behind Evangeline Downs in Opelousas, Louisiana, which was ranked #6.

== History ==
=== Louisiana Course ===
==== 1838 ====
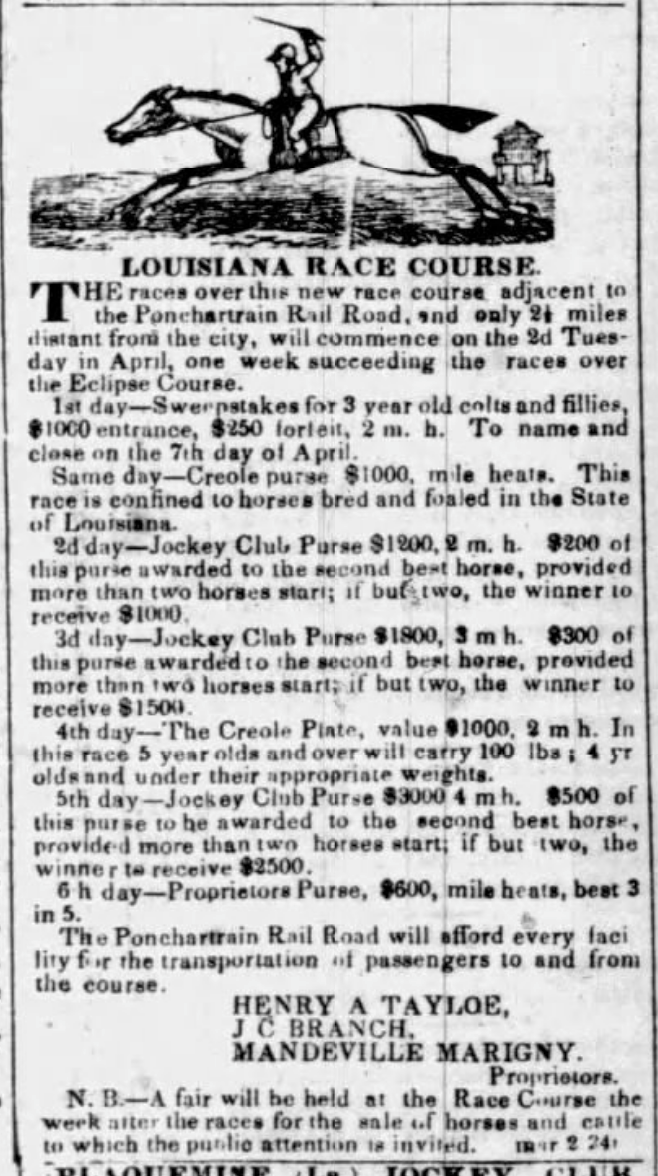
Louisiana Race Course Announcement, L'abeille De La Nouvelle-Orléans Sat, Mar 17, 1838 ·Page 1

On April 10 Bernard de Marigny, Julius C Branch and Henry Augustine Tayloe organised the Spring Meeting of The Louisiana Jockey Club at the Louisiana Race Course. Tayloe was a member of the founding dynasty of American horseracing: the son of John Tayloe III, founder of the Washington Jockey Club, who imported the first Epsom Derby winner Diomed and with him bred the foundational American thoroughbred Sir Archy; and the grandson of John Tayloe II who imported Childers (by Flying Childers), Jenny Cameron and Jolly Rogers (three of the most important colonial imports) to his stud farm Mount Airy.

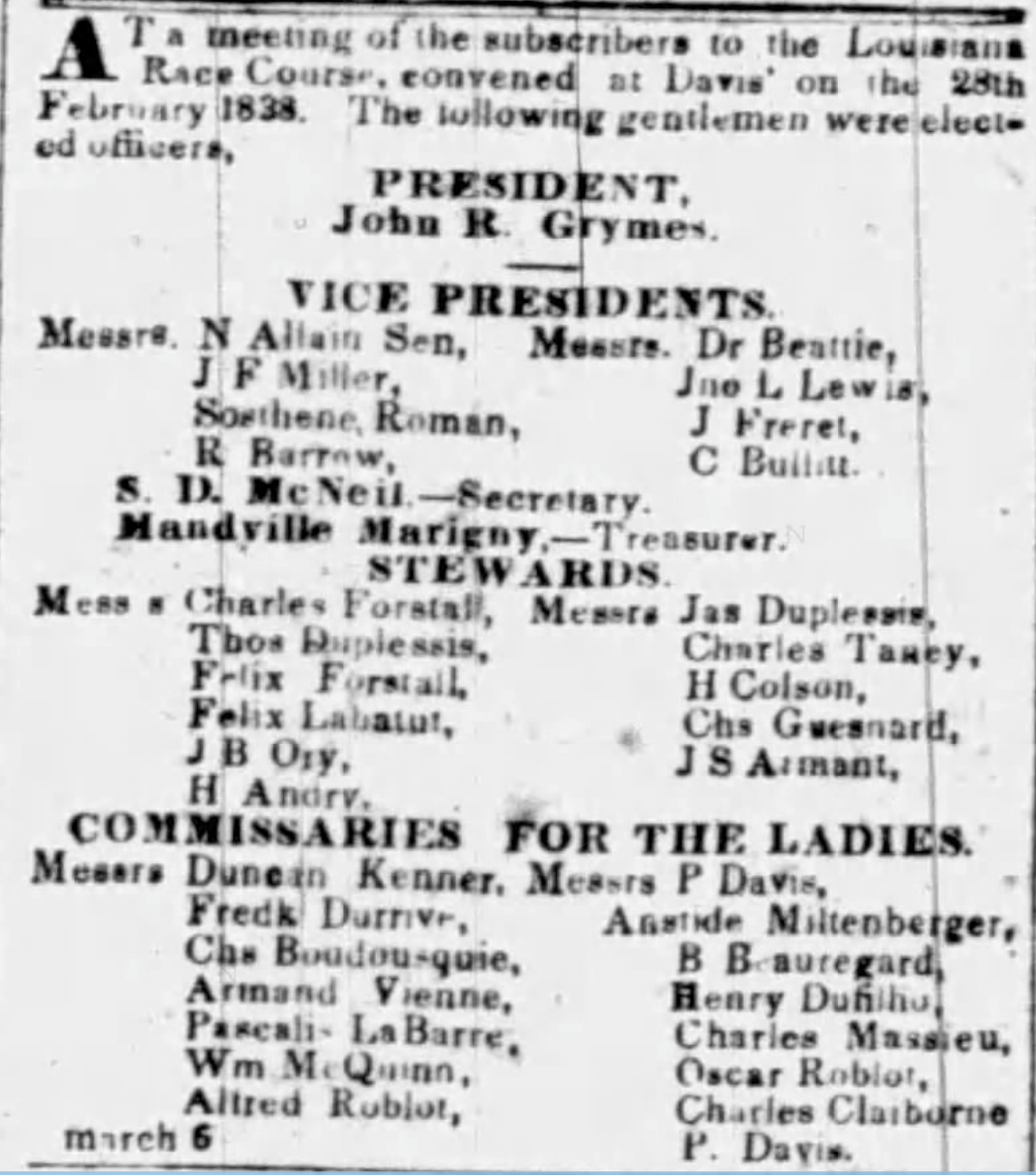
Louisiana Jockey Club Subscribers Meeting

Subscribers were organized by John Randolph Grymes, President (cousin of Henry Tayloe), Vice Presidents: N. Allian Sen, J.F. Miller, Sosthene Roman (Oak Alley Plantation), Robert Ruffin Barrow, Dr. Beattie, John L. Lewis (politician), J. Freret (father of James Freret), and Cuthbert Bullitt. S. D. McNeil was the Secretary and Proprietor Bernard de Marigny (Marigny de Mandiville) was the Treasurer. Stewards included: Charles Forstall, Thomas Duplessis, Felix Forstall, Felix Labatut, Jean Baptiste Ory, H. Andry, Jas. Duplessis, Charles Taney, H. Colson, Charles Guesnard, and Jean Seraphim Armant. Commissaries for the Ladies: Duncan Kenner, Frederick Durrive, Charles Boudousquie, Armand Vienne, Pascalis de la Barre, William McQuinn, Alfred Roblot, Pierre Davis, Aristide Miltenberger, B. Beauregard, Henri Dufilho, Charles Massieu, Oscar Roblot, and Charles W. W. Claiborne (son of William C. C. Claiborne).

===== Spring Races =====
April 10 the first race for "The Creole Purse" $1,000, free only for horses bred and owned in the state of Louisiana; two-year-olds a feather' three-year-olds 86lbs; four-year-olds, 100lbs' five-year-olds, 110lbs; six-year-olds, 118lbs; aged 124lbs; with the usual allowance of three pounds to mare and geldings; mile heats. First Day, First Race - owners and horses: Fergus Duplantier, Louisianese; John F Miller, Lord of the Isles; Robert J Barrows, Tom Jones; Y.N. Oliver, Pocohantas; Sosthene Allian, Tresorrier. Second Race, sweepstakes for three-year-olds, weights as before, five subscribers at $1000 each, $250 forfeit, mile heats. Owners and horses: William J Minor, Britiania; Thos. J Wells, Taglioni; John F Miller, John Boy; Henry Tayloe, Tom Thurman; Col Robert Smith, Lavinia. The second day, first race, purse $1,200, entrance $120, free for all ages, weights as before, two-mile heats. Owners and horses: Minor Kenner, Richard of York; A Barrows, Louisa Bascombe; Fergus Duplantier, Wren.The third day, purse $1,800, entrance $180, free for all ages, weights as before, three-mile heats. Owners and horses: Wm. R Barrow, Pressure, Thos. J Wells, Dick Chin; J. S. Garrison, Pollard; John Randolph Grymes, Susan Yandall; Robert Smith, Pete Whetstone. Fourth day "Creole Plate" (as seen in the picture), valued at $1,000. Entrance $100, five-year-olds and over to carry 100lbs; four-year-olds and under their appropriate weights, two-mile heats. Owners and horses: Adam Lewis Bingaman, Angora; Henry A. Tayloe, Hortense.

==== Gallery ====
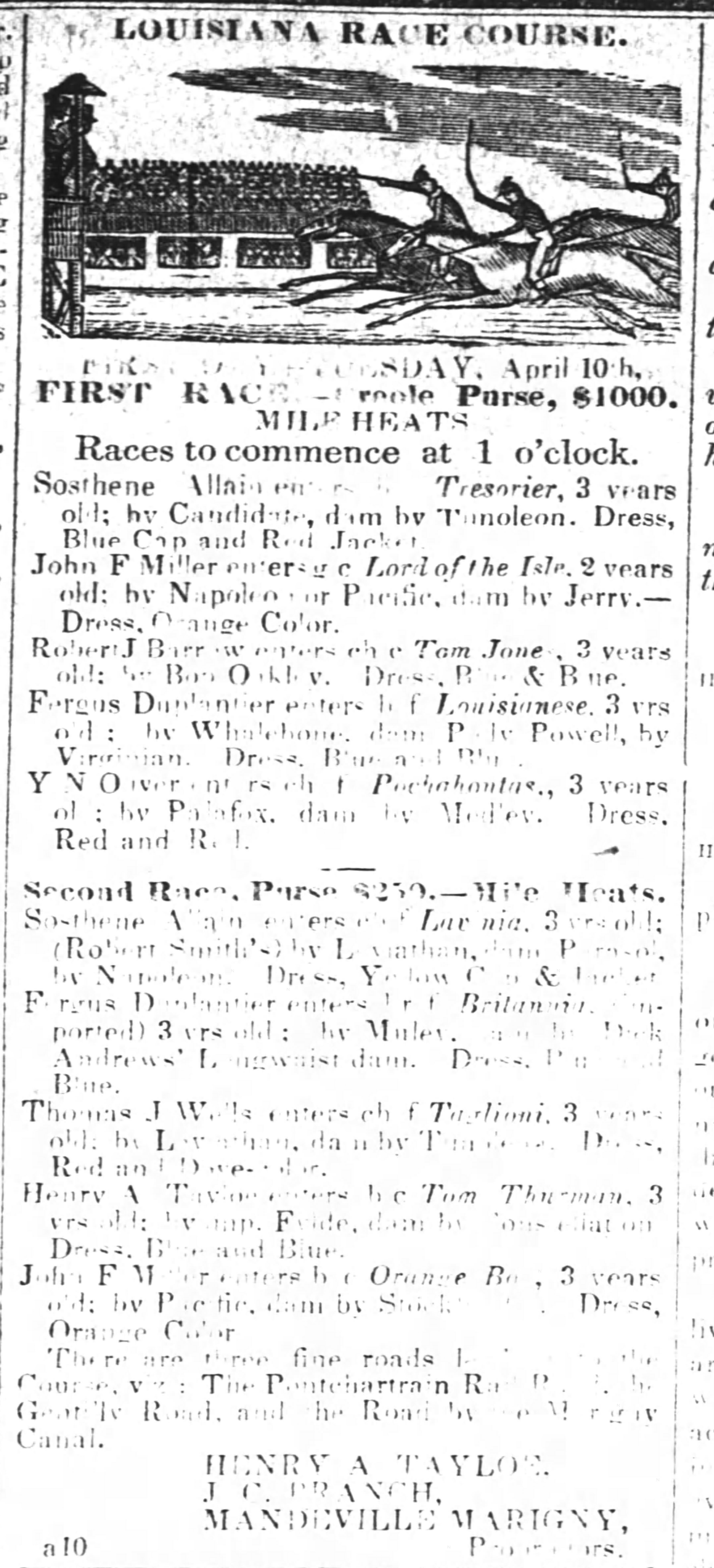
SPRING DAY 1 Results Louisiana Race Course The Times Picayune Tue Apr 10 1838

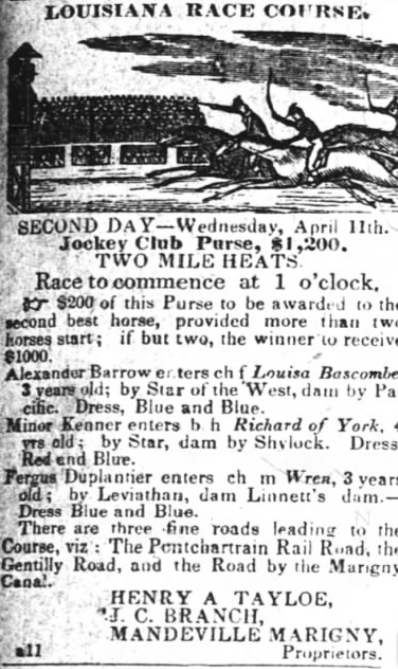
SPRING DAY 2, Louisiana Race Course 1838

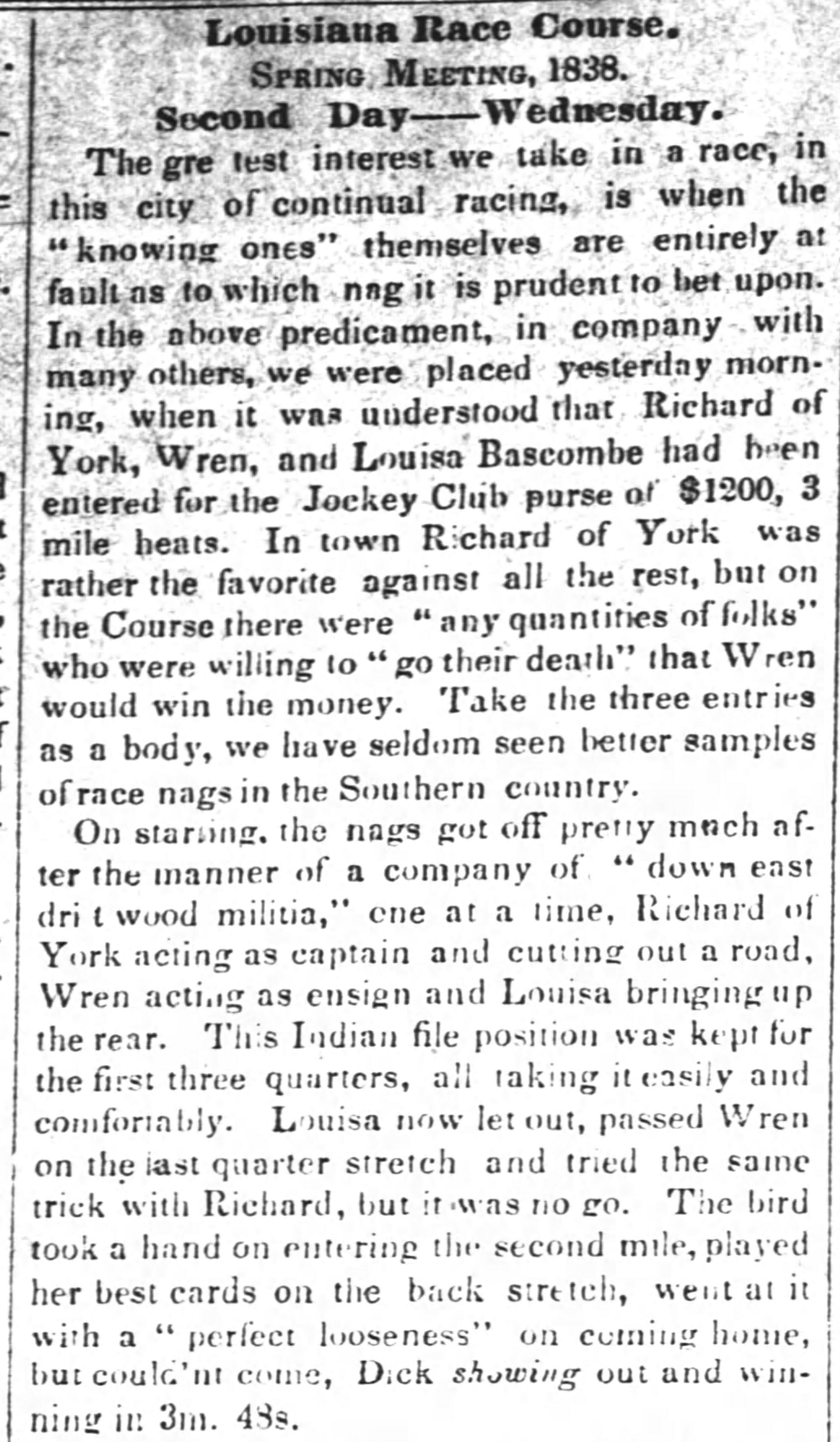
Day 2 Results Spring Meeting Louisiana Jockey Club The Times Picayune Thu Apr 12 1838

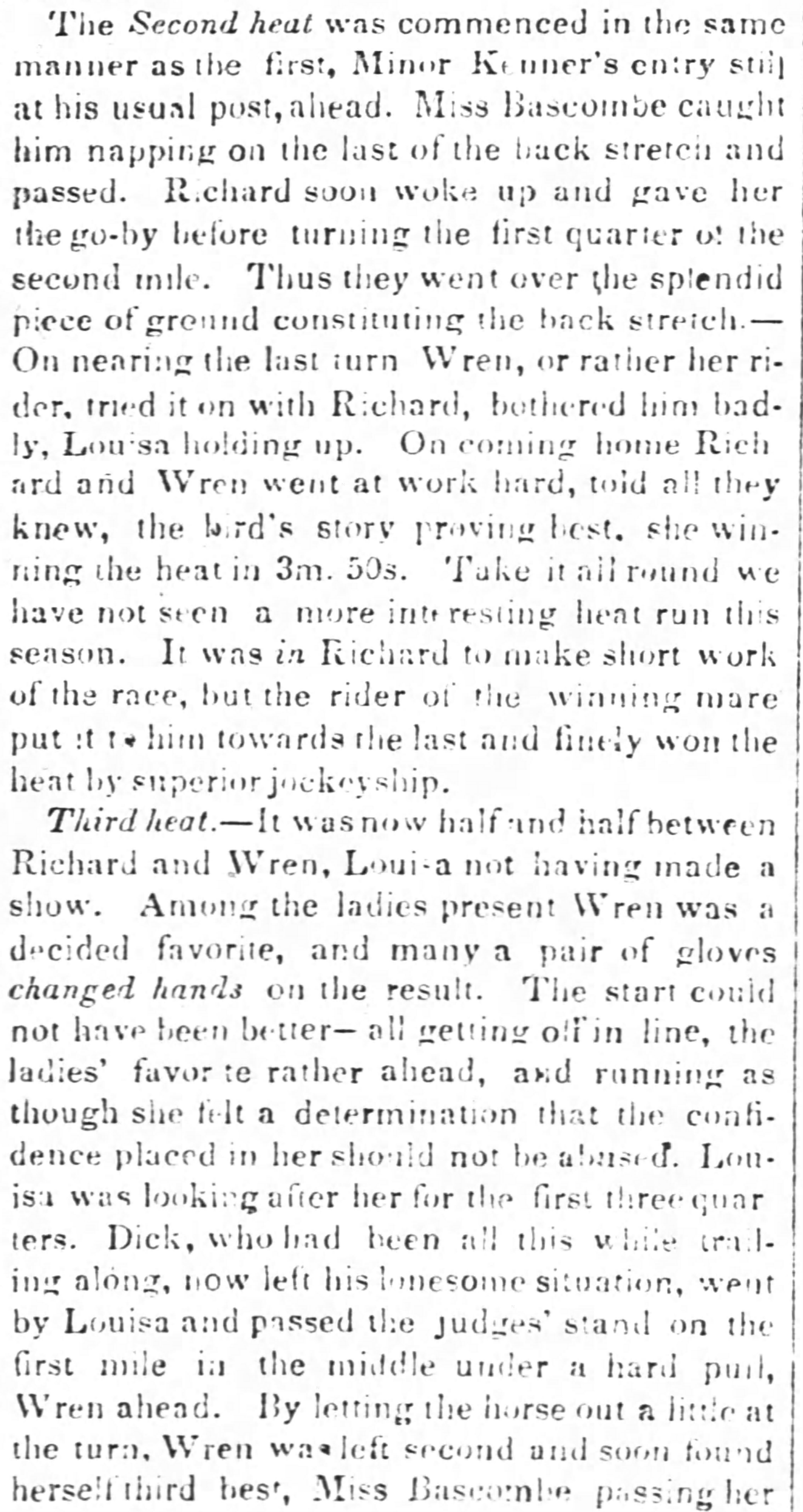
Day 2 Results Spring Meeting Louisiana Jockey Club The Times Picayune Thu Apr 12 1838 (1)

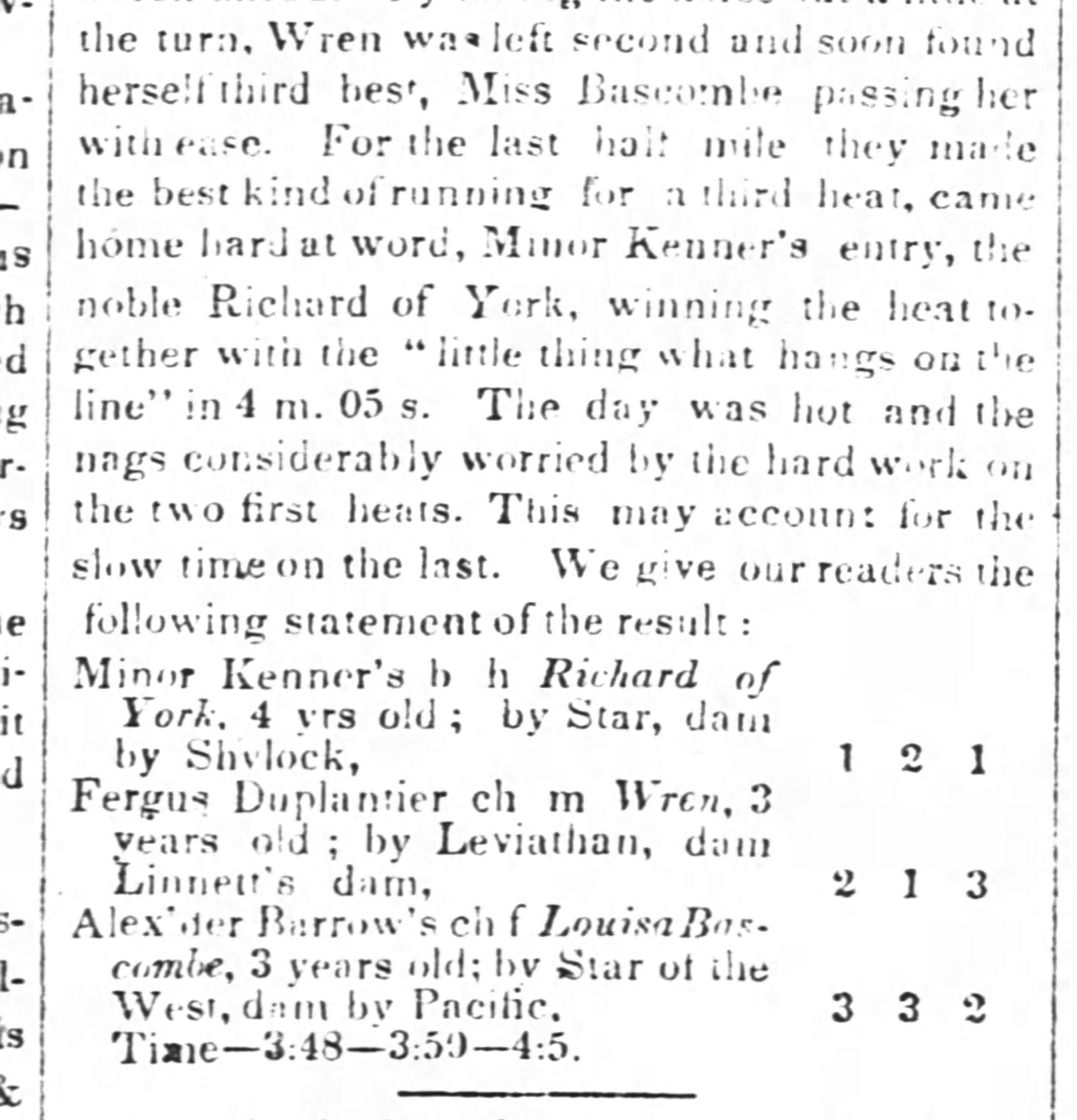
Day 2 Results Spring Meeting Louisiana Jockey Club The Times Picayune Thu Apr 12 1838 (2)

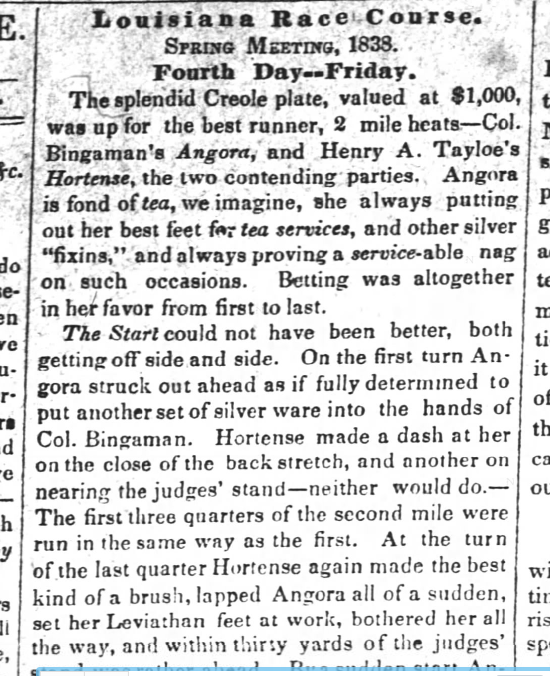
SPRING DAY 4 RESULTS Louisiana Race Course 1838

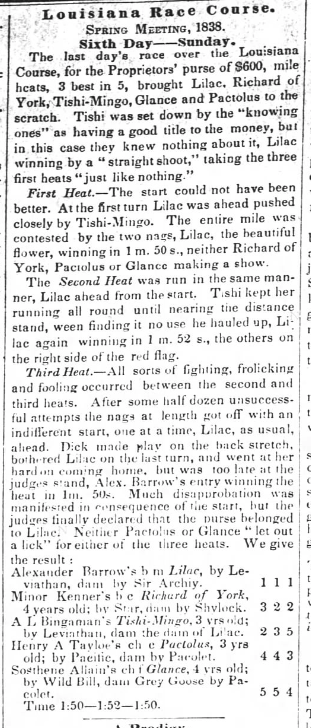
SPRING DAY 6 RESULTS Louisiana Race Course 1838

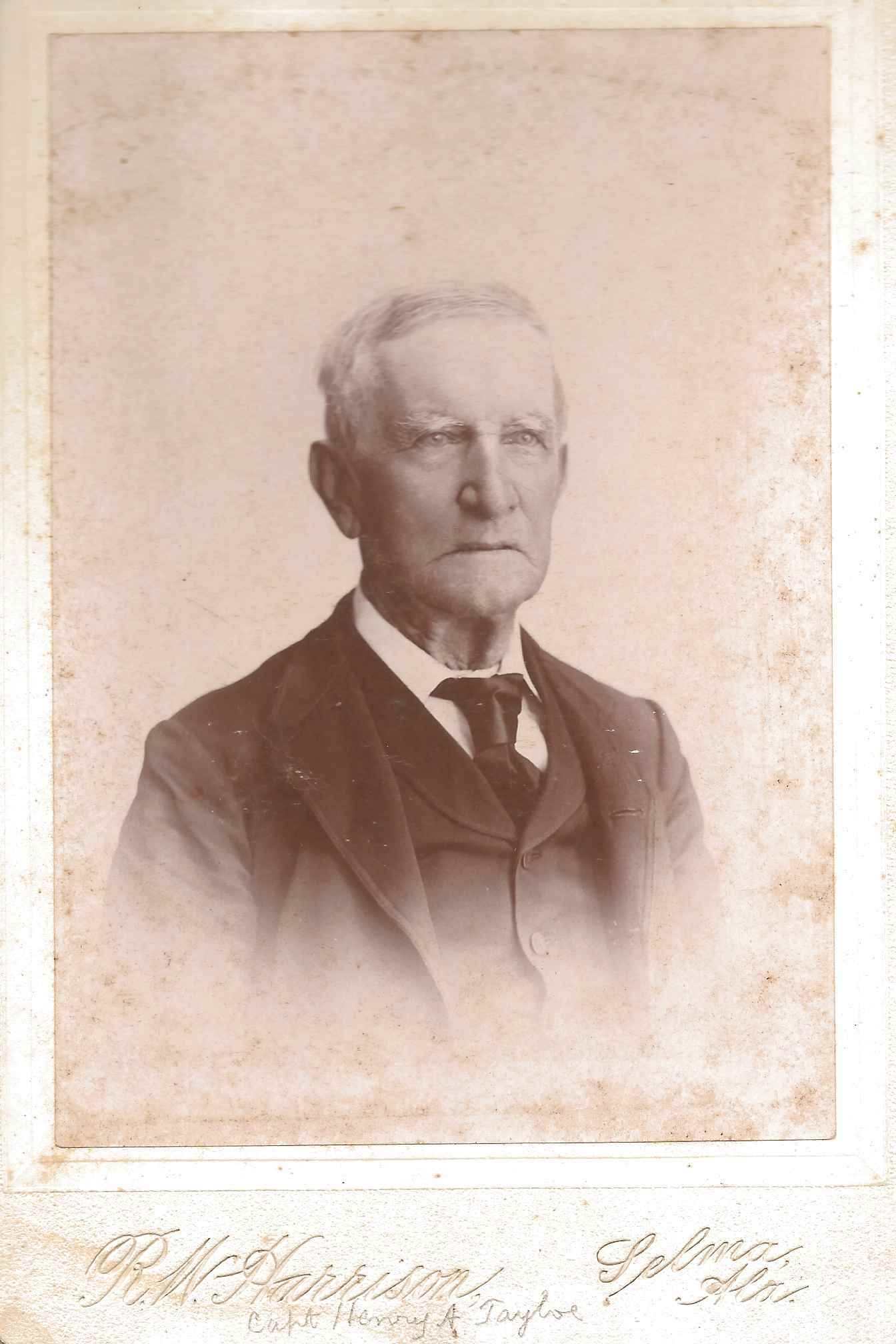
Henry Augustine Tayloe, Co-Proprietor

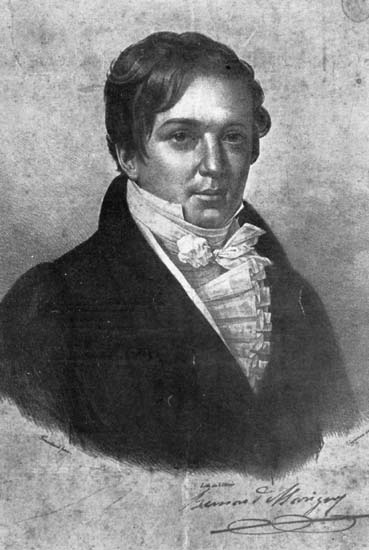
Bernard de Marigny, Co-Proprietor

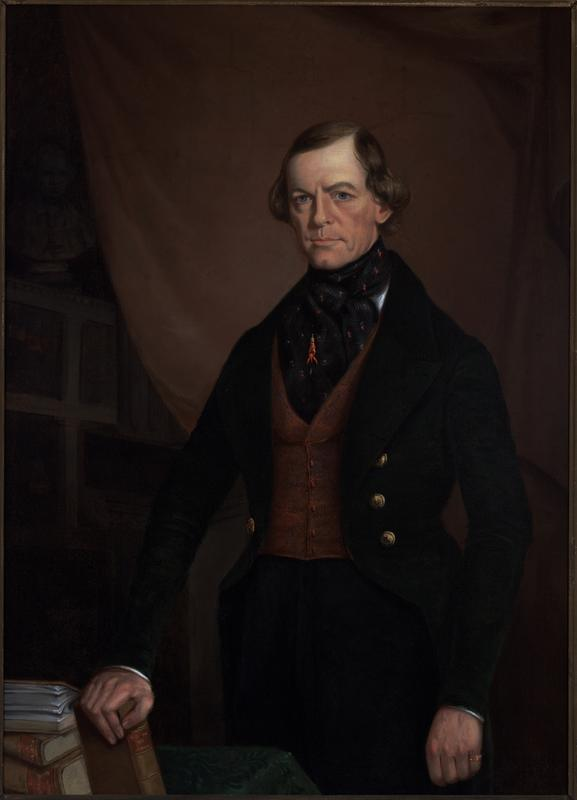
John Randolph Grymes owner of Susan Yandall (horse)

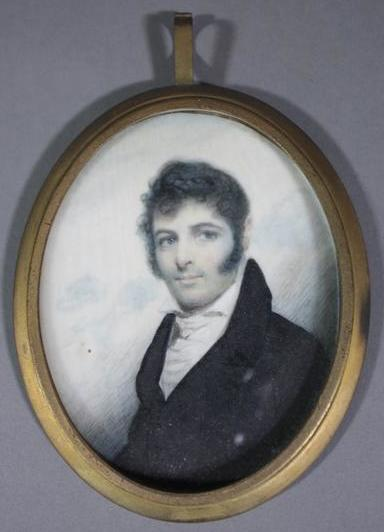
Adam Lewis Bingaman owner of Angora, winner of Louisiana Jockey Club Plate

===== Fall Races =====
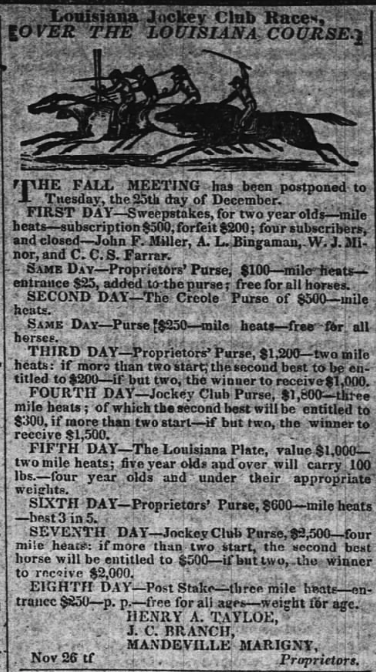
FALL PREVIEW Louisiana Race Course 1838

==== 1839 ====
===== Spring Races =====
Began on March 20, 1839, and lasted five days. "The First Day was the "Creole Purse" for $500, one-mile heats; the same day the "Proprietors Purse" for $250, one mile heats; and third race "Sweepstakes" (See Spirit of Times). Second Day-"Proprietors Purse" $1,200—two-mile heat; if more than two start the second best to be entitled to $200-but if two, the winner to receive $1,000. Third-Day-"Jockey Club Purse" $1,800—three-mile heats; of which the second best will be entitled to $300, if more than two start-if but two, the winner to receive $1500. Fourth Day-"Jockey Club Plate" value $1,500 and $500, -four-mile heats-to the winner, and $500 to the second-best horse, provided more than two start. Fifth Day-"Proprietors Purse" $600—mile heat-best 3 in 5; Same Day-"The Louisiana Plate" value $1,000—two-mile heats; five-year-olds and over will carry 100lbs.- four-year-olds and under their appropriate weight."

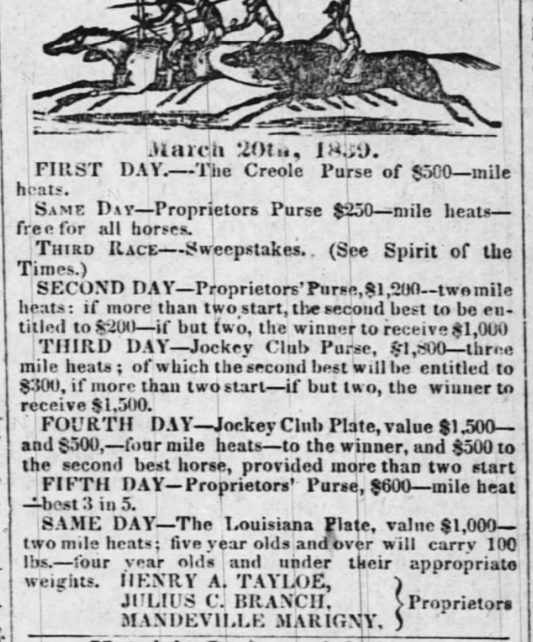
Louisiana Race Course 1939 Spring Meeting Day 1

===== Fall Races =====
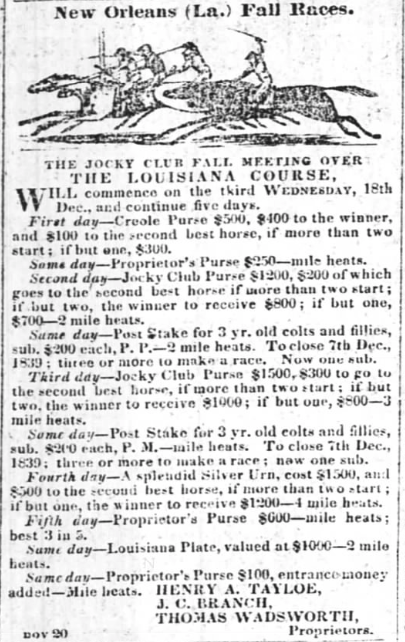
Louisiana Race Course Fall 1839 Announcement

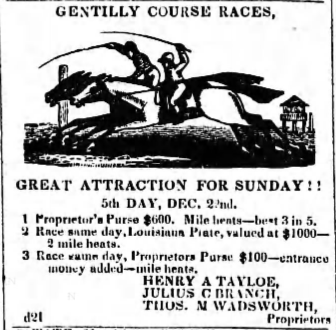
Gentily Race Course Fall 1839 5th Day

==== 1840 ====
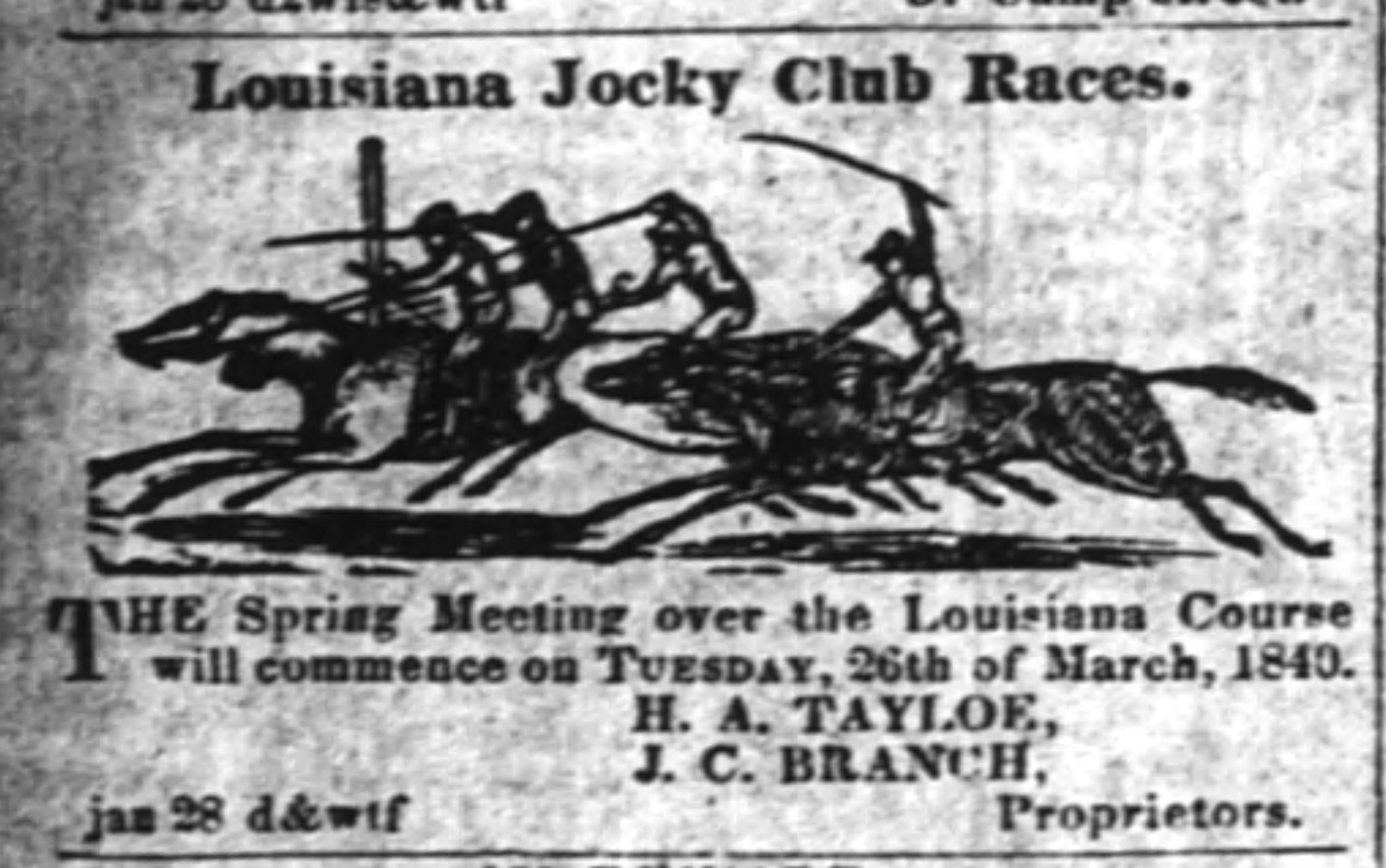
Louisiana Jockey Club at the Fair Grounds Race Course The Times Picayune Wed Jan 29 1840

=== Union Race Course ===
==== Second opening ====
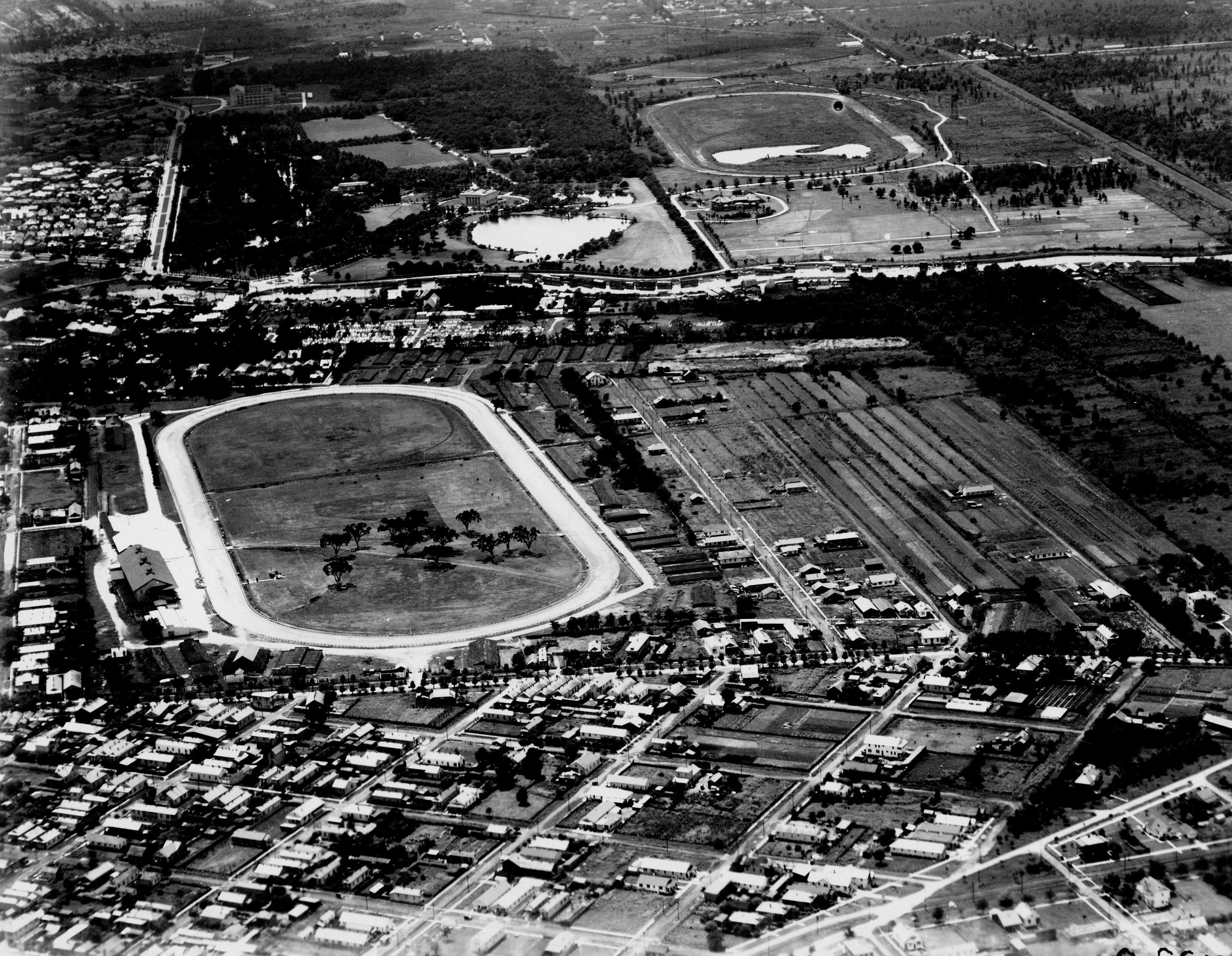
Fair Grounds in 1922

The track opened again as the "Union Race Course" in 1852. The track closed in 1857 due to competition from the Metairie Course. In 1859 the track was renamed the "Creole Race Course." In 1863, the name was changed again to the "Fair Grounds" and racing was conducted during the Civil War.

The track then closed when the Metairie Course reopened after the war. In 1871, the younger members of the Metairie Jockey Club broke away to re-form the then defunct Louisiana Jockey Club and again hold meets at the Fair Grounds. In 1872 the first race card is held at the Fair Grounds under the auspices of the Louisiana Jockey Club.

The Crescent City Jockey Club was established in 1892 and ran a winter racing season from December to April until they had to liquidate their assets in the spring of 1913.

In 1907, Colonel Matt Winn arrived in New Orleans to establish racing dates and deal with other matters in the Louisiana horse industry. In 1908, racing was banned in New Orleans but returned in 1915. In 1919 a fire burned down the grandstand but the track was still able to conduct a race meeting.

In 1921, an auto race was held at the track, the only car race at the fairgrounds.

In 1940, legislative sanction was given to racing in Louisiana. The track was then sold to developers Morris and Jake Hyman for the construction of a subdivision. In 1941, a group of investors saved Fair Grounds from destruction. The track resumed racing after World War II.

The Fair Grounds Racing Hall of Fame was established in 1971.

In 1981 a turf course was installed. In 1990 the track was sold to the Krantz family. In 1993, the grandstand was completely destroyed by a seven-alarm fire and racing continued with temporary facilities in place for a couple of years. A new $27 million construction project began in 1994 and the completed grandstand/clubhouse was opened to the public on Thanksgiving Day 1997. The track was purchased by Churchill Downs Incorporated in 2004. Fair Grounds was heavily damaged in Hurricane Katrina, and was closed for over a year, until re-opening on Thanksgiving Day 2006. The track conducted a 37-day meet at Louisiana Downs in replacement of the scheduled 2005-2006 meet.

Both the race mare Pan Zareta and the winner of the 1924 Kentucky Derby, Black Gold, are buried in the infield. It's also here that Tippity Witchet, the son of Broomstick, ran many of his 266 races.

== Physical attributes ==
The track consists of a one-mile (1.6 km) dirt track and a seven-furlong turf oval. Unlike most dirt courses in North America, the track has no chutes. In addition to the grandstand and clubhouse, an adjacent building, formerly used for simulcasting, opened on September 21, 2007, as a temporary slot-machine gaming facility. On November 14, 2008, the new slot-machine facility opened for operation.

== TV personalities ==
- Donna Barton Brothers (1999–2002)
- Vince Marinello (1990–2005)
- Mike Diliberto (1990–2005)
- Jessica Pacheco (2006–2010)
- John G. Dooley (2004–present)
- Rick Mocklin (2009 fill-in)
- Katie Mikolay (2010–2013)
- Brian W. Spencer (2013–2017)
- Joe Kristufek (2017–present)

== Racing ==
In a normal year, the following graded stakes are run at Fair Grounds, the most prestigious of which is the Louisiana Derby, a Grade II stakes. The race is a major preparatory race for the Kentucky Derby as part of the Second leg of series for points on the Road to the Kentucky Derby.

The following Graded events were held at Fair Grounds in 2019.

Grade II:

- Fair Grounds Oaks
- Louisiana Derby
- Mervin H. Muniz Jr. Memorial Handicap
- New Orleans Handicap
- Rachel Alexandra Stakes
- Risen Star Stakes

Grade III:

- Lecomte Stakes
- Fair Grounds Handicap
- Mineshaft Handicap

Also on the card are several important ungraded races including:

- Daisy Devine Stakes (formerly Bayou Handicap)
- Black Gold Stakes
- Bonapaw Stakes
- Colonel E.R. Bradley Handicap
- Crescent City Derby
- Crescent City Oaks
- Dixie Poker Ace Stakes
- Duncan F. Kenner Stakes
- Louisiana Champions Day Classic
- Louisiana Champions Day Juvenile Stakes
- Louisiana Champions Day Ladies Stakes
- Louisiana Champions Day Ladies Sprint Stakes
- Louisiana Handicap
- Mardi Gras Stakes
- Marie G. Krantz Memorial Handicap
- Pan Zareta Stakes
- Silverbulletday Stakes
- Sugar Bowl Stakes
- Tenacious Stakes
- Thanksgiving Classic
- Tiffany Lass Stakes
- Woodchopper Stakes

== Other events ==
The Fair Grounds is also the location of the New Orleans Jazz & Heritage Festival, held each year over consecutive four-day weekends - generally the last weekend in April and the first weekend in May.

== See also ==
- List of music venues
