= Lincoln Heritage Handicap =

- Class: Ungraded stakes
- Location: Arlington Park; Arlington Heights, Illinois, United States
- Inaugurated: 1976
- Race type: Thoroughbred – Flat racing
- Website: www.arlingtonpark.com

Race information
- Distance: 1 1/16 miles (8.5 furlongs)
- Surface: Turf
- Track: Left-handed
- Qualification: Fillies & Mares, 3-years-old & up
- Weight: Assigned
- Purse: US$100,000

The Lincoln Heritage Handicap is an American Thoroughbred horse race held annually at Arlington Park in Arlington Heights, Illinois. An ungraded stakes raced on turf open to fillies and Mares, age three and older, it is contested over a distance of 1 1/16 miles (8.5 furlongs).

The 2009 edition had to be moved to the main track's Polytrack synthetic dirt.

Inaugurated in 1976 as the Anita Peabody Handicap, in 1998 it was renamed the Lincoln Heritage Handicap.

In 1980, 1981, 1984, and in 1988, the race was run in two divisions.

Since inception, the race has been contested at various distances on both dirt and turf:

- 1 mile : 1976, 1987, on turf
- 1 mile : 1985, 1988, on dirt at Hawthorne Race Course
- 7/8 mile : 1977–1978 on dirt
- 1 1/16 miles : 1980, on dirt
- 1 1/16 miles : 1979–1984, 1986, 1989–2008, on turf
- 1 1/16 miles : 2009, on Polytrack synthetic dirt

== Records ==
Speed record: (at current distance of 1 1/16 miles on turf)

- 1:42.20 – Lady Shirl (1990)

Most wins:

- 3 – Lady Shirl (1990, 1991, 1993)

Most wins by a jockey:

- 7 – Earlie Fires (1980, 1984, 1988 (2×), 1993, 1994, 2003)

Most wins by a trainer:

- 4 – Moises Yanez (1984, 1986, 1994, 2008)
- 4 – P. Noel Hickey (1990, 1991, 1993, 1996)
- 4 – Chris M. Block (2000, 2001, 2004, 2009)

Most wins by an owner:

- 5 – Irish Acres Farm (1990, 1991, 1993, 1996, 1997)

== Winners ==
Year	Winner	Age	Jockey	Trainer	Owner	Time
2009	Apple Martini	4	Eusebio Razo Jr.	Chris M. Block	Virginia H. Tarra Trust	1:46.43
2008	Lady Lionel	6	Junior Alvarado	Moises Yanez	C. Sigrist & Del Sol Farm	1:44.48
2007	Royal Leah	5	Jesse M. Campbell	Mike Stidham	Triple C Thorobreds	1:44.03
2006	Ms Lydonia	4	Larry Sterling Jr.	Christine Janks	Est. of W. Lydon/Carson Springs Farm	1:42.99
2005	Beau Happy	4	Jesse M. Campbell	Mike Stidham	Quarter B. Farm	1:43.17
2004	Lighthouse Lil	5	Carlos Marquez Jr.	Chris M. Block	Hussar Racing Stable LLC	1:44.39
2003	Kate the Great	4	Earlie Fires	Michele Boyce	Barr Three	1:42.41
2002	Ellie's Rose	5	Larry Sterling Jr.	Michele Boyce	G. & S. Belpedio, W. Lloyd	1:42.86
2001	Ioya Two	6	Mark Guidry	Chris M. Block	Team Block	1:42.45
2000	Ioya Two	5	Alfredo Juarez Jr.	Chris M. Block	Team Block	1:43.45
1999	no race					
1998	no race					
1997	Barn Swallow †	4	Mark Guidry	Harvey L. Vanier	Nancy A. Vanier	1:42.93
1997	My Own Lovely Lee †	5	Garrett Gomez	Hilary Pridham	Irish Acres Farm	1:42.93
1996	My Own Lovely Lee	4	Garrett Gomez	P. Noel Hickey	Irish Acres Farm	1:43.76
1995	Nice Mistake	7	Ray Sibille	M. Oliver	Misty Meadows Farm	1:45.77
1994	Flower Circle †	4	Juvenal Diaz	Moises Yanez	C. & H. Disko	1:43.32
1994	Little Sucker †	5	Earlie Fires	Wayne M. Catalano	Darrell Yates	1:43.32
1993	Lady Shirl	6	Earlie Fires	P. Noel Hickey	Irish Acres Farm	1:43.72
1992	Explosive Kate	5	Carlos Silva	Lou M. Goldfine	Richard L. Duchossois	1:43.67
1991	Lady Shirl	4	Garrett Gomez	P. Noel Hickey	Irish Acres Farm	1:47.76
1990	Lady Shirl	3	Juvenal Diaz	P. Noel Hickey	Irish Acres Farm	1:42.20
1989	Let's Do Lunch	4	Jorge Velásquez	Lou M. Goldfine	Richard L. Duchossois	1:42.80
1988	Kelly's Super Pet	6	Earlie Fires	Robert G. Voelkner	Sidney L. Port	1:38.20
1988	Let's Do Lunch	3	Earlie Fires	Lou M. Goldfine	Richard L. Duchossois	1:38.00
1987	Spring Innocence	4	Pat Day	Stephen L. DiMauro	Triple C. Thorostock	1:38.20
1986	Magnetic Type	6	Juvenal Diaz	Moises Yanez	Al Namen Estate	1:48.40
1985	Sea Shell	6	Stanley Spencer	Harvey L. Vanier	Dr. L. Aitken	1:38.40
1984	Zenobia Empress	3	Earlie Fires	Joey Bollero	Russell Fortune Jr.	1:40.00
1984	Magnetic Type	4	Ronnie Hirdes Jr.	Moises Yanez	Al Namen	1:40.00
1983	Frantic Tumble	4	Geary Louviere	Paul T. Adwell	Fisher & Wiebe	1:42.20
1982	My Mom Helen	3	Rick Evans	Harold Salzsieder	Kenner & Woit Jr.	1:38.40
1981	Silent Intent	4	Pat Day	Ted McClain	Richard L. Duchossois	1:42.00
1981	Jinxed	3	Stanley Spencer	Harvey L. Vanier	M. L. Cashman	1:41.00
1980	Lawdy Miss Clawdy	4	Earlie Fires	James Levitch	Juanita Levitch	1:39.80
1980	Century Type	6	Dean Kutz	Geraldine Namen	Al Namen	1:42.20
1979	Margi J.	4	B. C. Talbert	Eddie Cole	Pipe & Paint Stable	1:41.20
1978	Noradonna	4	Darrell Haire	Paul T. Adwell	M. L. Cashman	1:24.40
1977	Helen's Music	5	Bryan Fann	Ernie T. Poulos	Five Loves Stable	1:24.20
1976	Rattlemark	4	D. P. Rodriguez	Harold Salzsieder	Windward Farm	1:38.60

† In 1994 and 1997 there was a Dead Heat for first.
