= Eusebio Razo Jr. =

Personal information
- Born: January 21, 1966 Mexico City, Mexico
- Died: April 24, 2012 (aged 46) Long Grove, Illinois, U.S.
- Occupation: Jockey

Horse racing career
- Sport: Horse racing
- Career wins: 2,962

Major racing wins
- Arlington Sprint Handicap (1997); Hanshin Cup Handicap (2003, 2005); Round Table Stakes (2003); Arlington-Washington Futurity Stakes (2004); Washington Park Handicap (2004); Cornhusker Handicap (2005, 2010); Isaac Murphy Handicap (2006); Smarty Jones Stakes (2008); Arlington Classic (2009); Lincoln Heritage Handicap (2009); Arlington-Washington Lassie Stakes (2011)

Significant horses
- Black Tie Affair, Eye of the Tiger, Happy Ticket, Fort Prado
- Updated on April 25, 2012

Eusebio "Eddie" Razo Jr. (January 21, 1966 – April 24, 2012) was a Mexican-born American jockey.

Razo rode for three years in his native Mexico before arriving in the United States in 1983. Up until his death he had won 2,962 races from 24,270 starts, and his horses had earned $64,011,843 in purses.

Razo spent most of his career at the Chicago area tracks: Arlington Park, Hawthorne Race Course and Sportsman's Park when the latter raced thoroughbreds.

Razo died in an explosion and garage fire at his home in Long Grove, Illinois on April 24, 2012. He was 46.

| Chart (2000–2008) | Peak position |
|---|---|
| National Earnings List for Jockeys 2000 | 86 |
| National Earnings List for Jockeys 2001 | 88 |
| National Earnings List for Jockeys 2002 | 98 |
| National Earnings List for Jockeys 2003 | 51 |
| National Earnings List for Jockeys 2004 | 47 |
| National Earnings List for Jockeys 2005 | 52 |
| National Earnings List for Jockeys 2006 | 72 |
| National Earnings List for Jockeys 2007 | 70 |
| National Earnings List for Jockeys 2008 | 68 |
