= Arlington Sprint Handicap =

- Class: Ungraded stakes
- Location: Arlington Park; Arlington Heights, Illinois, United States
- Inaugurated: 1990
- Race type: Thoroughbred – Flat racing
- Website: www.arlingtonpark.com

Race information
- Distance: 5.5 furlongs
- Surface: Turf
- Track: Left-handed
- Qualification: Three-year-olds & up
- Weight: Assigned
- Purse: US$200,000

The Arlington Sprint Handicap is an American Thoroughbred horse race run annually during the second week of July at Arlington Park Racetrack in Arlington Heights, Illinois. A non-graded stakes open to horses age three and older, it is a sprint race contested on turf over a distance of 5 1/2 furlongs.

Part of the Breeders' Cup Challenge series, the winner of the 2009 Arlington Sprint automatically qualifies for the Breeders' Cup Turf Sprint.

Inaugurated in 1990 as the Arlington Sprint Championship, the name was changed to the Arlington Breeders' Cup Sprint for the 1996, 1997, 2000, 2001, and 2004 through 2006 editions. It was given its present name in 2007.

Since inception in 1990, the Arlington Sprint has been contested at various distances on both dirt and turf:

- 7 furlongs on dirt : 1990
- 6 furlongs on dirt : 1996–2007
- 5.5 furlongs on turf : 2008–present

There was no race run from 1991–1995 and 1998–1999.

== Records ==
Speed record:

- 1:01.89 – Mr. Nightlinger (2008) (at current distance of 5.5 furlongs)

Most wins:

- 3 – Bet On Sunshine (1997, 2000, 2001)

Most wins by an owner:

- 3 – David P. Holloway Racing (1997, 2000, 2001)

Most wins by a jockey:

- No jockey has won this race more than once.

Most wins by a trainer:

- 3 – Paul J. McGee (1997, 2000, 2001)

== Winners ==
Year	Winner	Age	Jockey	Trainer	Owner	Time
2014	Saint Leon	9	E. T. Baird	Michele Boyce	Margaret Burlingham	1:03.45
2013	Saint Leon	8	E. T. Baird	Michele Boyce	Margaret Burlingham	1:03.00
2012	Saint Leon	7	E. T. Baird	Michele Boyce	Margaret Burlingham	1:03.18
2011	Havelock	4	Jermaine V. Bridgmohan	Darren Miller	Silverton Hill LLC	1:02.71
2010	Chamberlain Bridge	6	Jamie Theriot	W. Bret Calhoun	Carl Moore	1:03.66
2009	Yankee Injunuity	5	E. T. Baird	James R. McMullen	Encore Racing & J. R. McMullen	1:02.50
2008	Mr. Nightliner	4	Jamie Theriot	W. Bret Calhoun	Martin Racing &	1:01.89
2007	Piratesonthelake †	3	Diego Sanchez	James P. DiVito	B. Jock Racing LLC	1:09.14
2007	In Summation †	4	René Douglas	Christophe Clement	Waterford Stable	1:09.14
2006	Gold Storm	6	Tracy Hebert	Charles W. Cascio	Keith McKinney	1:08.39
2005	Fifteen Rounds	5	Christopher Emigh	Christine K. Janks	Ken Meeker & Carson Springs Farm	1:08.51
2004	Gold Storm	4	Larry Taylor	Charles W. Cascio	Keith McKinney & Jack Sweesy	1:08.65
2003	Out of My Way	6	Curt Bourque	Gene A. Cilio	Crown's Way Farm et al.	1:09.82
2002	Bonapaw	6	Gerard Melancon	Norman C. Miller III	J. & D. Richard	1:09.13
2001	Bet On Sunshine	9	Marlon St. Julien	Paul J. McGee	David P. Holloway Racing	1:10.06
2000	Bet On Sunshine	8	Francisco Torres	Paul J. McGee	David P. Holloway Racing	1:09.77
1997	Hunk of Class †	4	Eusebio Razo Jr.	Kenneth R. Spraggins	K. R. Spraggins & J. Lombardo	1:09.99
1998	1999	Race not held				
1997	Bet On Sunshine †	5	Pat Day	Paul J. McGee	David P. Holloway Racing	1:09.99
1996	Ft. Stockton	4	Shane Sellers	Ben Perkins Jr.	New Farm	1:08.77
1991	1995	Race not held				
1990	Hammocker	6	Kerwin Clark	Harvey L. Vanier	Nancy A. Vanier	1:24.60

- † There were Dead Heats in 1997 and again in 2007.
