= Michigan Mile And One-Eighth Handicap =

- Class: Discontinued stakes
- Location: Detroit Race Course; Livonia, Michigan, United States
- Inaugurated: 1950
- Race type: Thoroughbred - Flat racing

Race information
- Distance: 1 1/8 miles (9 furlongs)
- Surface: Dirt
- Track: left-handed
- Qualification: Three-year-olds & up
- Weight: Assigned

The Michigan Mile And One-Eighth Handicap was an American Thoroughbred horse race run annually at the now defunct Detroit Race Course in Livonia, Michigan. A one time Grade II event raced on dirt, it was open to horses age three and older.

First run in 1950, its popularity saw the 1958 edition of the Michigan Mile And One-Eighth Handicap draw the largest crowd in the racetrack's history. That 1958 race was won by E. P. Taylor's Nearctic, a future Canadian Horse Racing Hall of Fame inductee and sire of the supersire Northern Dancer.

In 1975, trainer S Kaye Bell became the first female in the United States to condition the winner of a $100,000 stakes race.

Upsets include Stanislas defeating Tom Rolfe in 1966 and Nodouble in 1968 beating the reigning American Horse of the Year, Damascus.

== Records ==
Speed record:

- 1:36.20 @ 1 mile: Nearctic (1958)
- 1:40.60 @ 1-1/6 miles: Crimson Satan (1963)
- 1:47.40 @ 1-1/8 miles: My Night Out (1957), Calandrito (1969), Fast Hilarious (1970)

Most wins:

- No horse won this race more than once

Most wins by a jockey:

- 3 - Earl J. Knapp (1957, 1961, 1966)
- 3 - Carlos H. Marquez Sr. (1967, 1969, 1970)

Most wins by a trainer:

- 2 - Charles Kerr (1959, 1963)
- 2 - H. Allen Jerkens (1972, 1979)

Most wins by an owner:

- No owner won this race more than once

== Winners ==
Year	Winner	Age	Jockey	Trainer	Owner	Dist. (miles)	Time	Gr.
1993	Dignitas	4	Larry Melancon	George R. Arnold II	John H. Peace	1-1/8 m	1:48.80	G2
1992	Classic Seven	4	Fabio A. Arguello Jr.	Niall M. O'Callaghan	Thomas M. Cairns & M/M John O. Berry	1-1/8 m	1:49.60	G2
1991	Black Tie Affair	5	Pat Day	Ernie T. Poulos	Jeffrey Sullivan	1-1/8 m	1:49.80	G2
1990	Beau Genius	5	Ricardo D. Lopez	Gerald S. Bennett	Joseph Shiewitz & Dr. Brian Davidson	1-1/8 m	1:48.80	G2
1989	Present Value	5	Frank Olivares	Jerry M. Fanning	J. M. Fanning, Richard Fontana, Jay Bligh, Gary Potter	1-1/8 m	1:49.20	G2
1988	Lost Code	4	Craig Perret	L. William Donovan	Wendover Stable (Donald Levinson)	1-1/8 m	1:50.80	G2
1987	Waquoit	4	Chris McCarron	Guido Federico	Joseph Federico	1-1/8 m	1:50.00	G2
1986	Ends Well	5	Randy Romero	Robert J. Reinacher Jr.	Greentree Stable	1-1/8 m	1:49.40	G2
1985	Badwagon Harry	6	Ricardo D. Lopez	Reid T. Gross	Kerry Nagle	1-1/8 m	1:49.40	G2
1984	Timeless Native	4	Don Brumfield	Grover G. Delp	Hawksworth Farm	1-1/8 m	1:49.60	G2
1983	Thumbsucker	4	Anthony Russo Jr.	John Drumwright	Gat Stable	1-1/8 m	1:48.80	G2
1982	Vodika Collins	4	Joe Judice	Forrest H. Kaelin	Milbert B. Collins	1-1/8 m	1:50.40	G2
1981	Fio Rito	6	Leslie Hulet	Michael S. Ferraro	Raymond Lecesse	1-1/8 m	1:50.20	G2
1980	Glorious Song	4	John LeBlanc	Gerry Belanger	Frank Stronach	1-1/8 m	1:50.00	G2
1979	Sensitive Prince	4	Jacinto Vasquez	H. Allen Jerkens	Top the Marc Stable (Joseph Taub)	1-1/8 m	1:52.60	G2
1978	A Letter to Harry	4	Eddie Delahoussaye	John Oxley	Estate of Raymond F. Salmen	1-1/8 m	1:52.60	G2
1977	My Juliet	5	Anthony S. Black	Eugene H. Euster	George Weasel Jr.	1-1/8 m	1:48.40	G2
1976	Sharp Gary	5	Sam Maple	James D. Price	Edward R. Scharps	1-1/8 m	1:50.80	G2
1975	Mr. Lucky Phoenix	5	Bryan Fann	Kaye Bell	Albert Levinson	1-1/8 m	1:47.60	G2
1974	Tom Tulle	4	Craig Perret	Jere R. Smith Sr.	W. Archie Lofton	1-1/8 m	1:50.40	G2
1973	Golden Don	3	Mike Manganello	Oscar Dishman Jr.	Archie Donaldson	1-1/8 m	1:49.60	G2
1972-1	King's Bishop	3	Eddie Maple	Thomas J. Kelly	Craig F. Cullinan Jr.	1-1/8 m	1:49.20	
1972-2	Favorecidian	5	Angel Cordero Jr.	Sidney Watters Jr.	Hickory Tree Stable	1-1/8 m	1:48.80	
1971	Native Royalty	4	Ronald J. Campbell	John T. Davis	Harbor View Farm	1-1/8 m	1:48.00	
1970	Fast Hilarious	4	Carlos H. Marquez Sr.	Joseph M. Bollero	Dorothy Comiskey Rigney	1-1/8 m	1:47.40	
1969	Calandrito	4	Carlos H. Marquez Sr.	James F. Plett	Melvin T. Berry	1-1/8 m	1:47.40	
1968	Nodouble	3	Martinez Heath	J. Bert Sonnier	Verna Lea Stable (Gene Goff)	1-1/8 m	1:49.00	
1967	Estreno	6	Carlos H. Marquez Sr.	Dave Sazer	Robert Ballis	1-1/8 m	1:48.40	
1966	Stanislas	4	Danny Gargan	Mildred Kerr	Mildred Kerr	1-1/8 m	1:49.00	
1965	Old Hat	6	Robert Gallimore	Charles C. Norman	Stanley Conrad	1-1/8 m	1:49.40	
1964	Going Abroad Tibaldo (DH)	4	Ray Broussard Danny Gargan	Joseph H. Pierce Jr. Thomas J. Kelly	Seltzer Bros. (Edward & Harry) Esther D. du Pont	1-1/8 m	1:49.00	
1963	Crimson Satan	4	Herberto Hinojosa	Charles Kerr	Crimson King Farm (Peter W. Salmen Sr.)	1-1/16 m	1:40.60	
1962	Beau Prince	4	Steve Brooks	Jimmy Jones	Calumet Farm	1-1/16 m	1:43.20	
1961	American Comet	5	Earl J. Knapp	Marty L. Fallon	C. W. Smith Ent., Inc.	1-1/16 m	1:43.00	
1960	Little Fitz	5	William A. Peake	Robert C. Steele	J. C. Hauer Stable Inc. (John C. Hauer)	1-1/16 m	1:42.20	
1959	Total Traffic	5	Herberto Hinojosa	Charles Kerr	G and K Stable (Ralph Green & Charles Kerr)	1-1/16 m	1:41.80	
1958	Nearctic	4	Benny Sorenson	Gordon J. McCann	Windfields Farm	1 m	1:36.20	
1957	My Night Out	4	Earl J. Knapp	Ray Grundy	Darrell H. Wells	1-1/16 m	1:47.40	
1956	Nonnie Jo	5	Lois C. Cook	Vester R. Wright	James L. Paddock & Perne L. Grissom	1 m	1:36.40	
1955	Greatest	5	Tommy Barrow	Patrick B. Devereux	Thomas F. Devereux	1 m	1:36.80	
1954	Spur On	6	Paul J. Bailey	Elmer Kalensky	Bernard W. Landy	1 m	1:37.20	
1953	Second Avenue	6	Carroll Bierman	Alexis G. "Lex" Wilson	Theodore DeLong Buhl	1 m	1:37.80	
1952	Bully Boy	5	Sherman Armstrong	Hubert H. "Pete" Battle	Mrs. E. Dale Shaffer	1 m	1:40.20	
1951	King's Hope	3	Lois C. Cook	Frederick Sharpe	Mrs. Frederick Sharpe	1 m	1:37.60	
1950	Fancy Flyer	5	Manuel N. Gonzalez	Kenny Noe Jr.	Carl Graham	1 m	1:38.00	
