= Ernie T. Poulos =

American horse trainer

Ernie Poulos
Personal information
- Born: February 18, 1926 Chicago, Illinois, United States
- Died: March 30, 1997 (aged 71)
- Occupation: Trainer

Horse racing career
- Sport: Horse racing
- Career wins: Not found

Major racing wins
- Lincoln Heritage Handicap (1977); Equipoise Mile Handicap (1990); Commonwealth Stakes (1990, 1991); Hanshin Cup Handicap (1990); Hawthorne Gold Cup Handicap (1990); Cornhusker Breeders' Cup Handicap (1991); Michigan Mile And One-Eighth Handicap (1991); Stephen Foster Handicap (1991); Philip H. Iselin Handicap (1991); Washington Park Handicap (1991) Breeders' Cup wins: Breeders' Cup Classic (1991)

Racing awards
- RICF Governor's Award (2000)

Significant horses
- Black Tie Affair

Ernest T. Poulos (February 18, 1926 – March 30, 1997) was an American Thoroughbred horse trainer. A native of Chicago, he conditioned horses at local tracks beginning in 1952 but gained national attention when he took over the training of Black Tie Affair in 1989. Poulos guided the three-year-old colt through three highly successful years, capped off in 1991 with a win in the Breeders' Cup Classic and United States Horse of the Year honors.

Poulos served with the United States Merchant Marine and on June 6, 1944, he was on a ship that took part in the Normandy landings on D.Day.

Such was the admiration for Ernie Poulos in Chicago that when he died in 1997, his funeral was held at the Arlington Park race track. For his significant contribution to the Thoroughbred racing industry, in 2000 he was the posthumous recipient of the Governor's Award from the Racing Industry Charitable Foundation (RICF).
