= Christopher Emigh =

American jockey

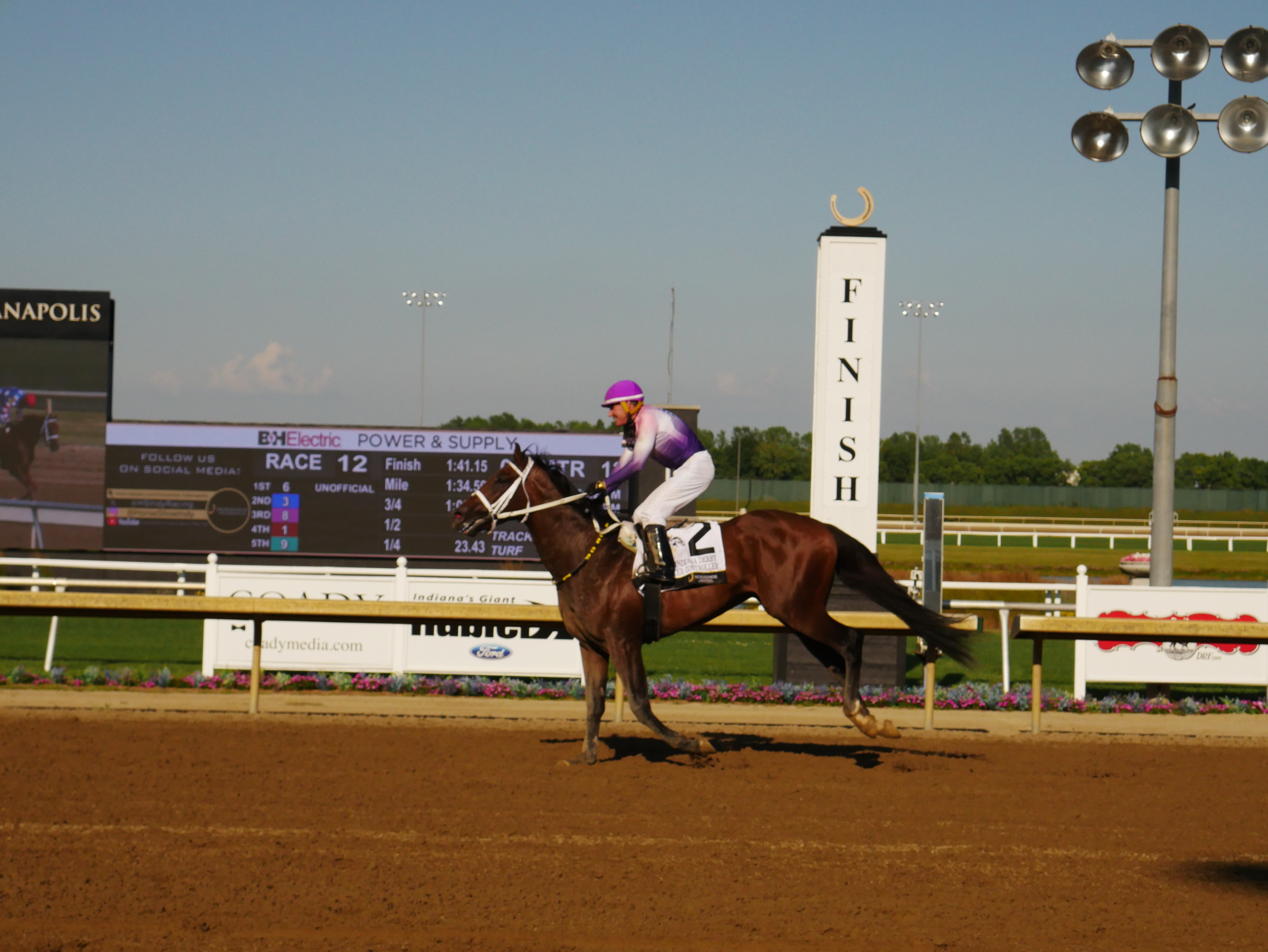
- Emigh and Master Controller at the 2025 Indiana Derby

Personal information
- Born: January 14, 1971 (age 55) Portsmouth, Virginia, United States
- Occupation: Jockey

Horse racing career
- Sport: Horse racing
- Career wins: 4,200+ (ongoing)

Major racing wins
- Hawthorne Gold Cup Handicap (1996); Isaac Murphy Handicap (2000); Sixty Sails Handicap (2004, 2009); Arlington Sprint Handicap (2005); American 1000 Guineas Stakes (2008); Rebel Stakes (2008); Miss Preakness Stakes (2008); Hawthorne Derby (2009)

Racing awards
- Hawthorne Race Course Champion jockey (7 times); Arlington Park Champion jockey (2006)

Christopher Alan Emigh (born January 14, 1971, in Portsmouth, Virginia) is a jockey in American Thoroughbred horse racing. He earned his first win as a professional at Evangeline Downs in 1989. The winner of more than 4,000 career races, he has won a riding title at Hawthorne Race Course seven times and at Arlington Park in 2006.

Chart (2000–present)	Peak position
National Earnings List for Jockeys 2000	54
National Earnings List for Jockeys 2001	69
National Earnings List for Jockeys 2002	56
National Earnings List for Jockeys 2003	64
National Earnings List for Jockeys 2004	46
National Earnings List for Jockeys 2005	39
National Earnings List for Jockeys 2006	33
National Earnings List for Jockeys 2007	47
National Earnings List for Jockeys 2008	54
National Earnings List for Jockeys 2009	80
National Earnings List for Jockeys 2010	99
