= Curt Bourque =

American jockey

Personal information
- Born: August 22, 1967 (age 59) Erath, Louisiana United States
- Occupation: Jockey

Horse racing career
- Sport: Horse racing
- Career wins: 3,350+

Major racing wins
- Hanshin Cup Handicap (1992, 1997); Arlington-Washington Futurity Stakes (1993); Breeders' Futurity Stakes (1993); Stars and Stripes Turf Handicap (1993); Washington Park Handicap (1993); Lane's End Stakes (1994); Cornhusker Handicap (1995); Isaac Murphy Handicap (1997); Super Derby (2008)

Significant horses
- Polar Expedition

Curt C. Bourque (born August 22, 1967, in Erath, Louisiana) is an American jockey in Thoroughbred horse racing. He began his riding career in 1984 at Evangeline Downs in Lafayette, Louisiana and won his first race later that year at Jefferson Downs Racetrack.

During his career, Bourque has ridden six winners on a single card at Evangeline Downs. Riding in Chicago for the first time in 1992, he rode five winners on one racecard at Sportsman's Park Racetrack. He has won riding titles at Fair Grounds Race Course in New Orleans as well as at Chicago's Hawthorne Race Course and Sportsman's Park.

Chart (2000–present)	Peak position
National Earnings List for Jockeys 2000	92
National Earnings List for Jockeys 2003	76
National Earnings List for Jockeys 2007	85
