= Thousand Guineas =

Thousand Guineas is the name of a number of different horse races:

- 1000 Guineas Stakes in Great Britain
- 1,000 Guineas Trial Stakes trial race for the 1000 Guineas Stakes in Great Britain
- Thousand Guineas Prelude and The Thousand Guineas in Australia
- Poule d'Essai des Pouliches also known as the "French 1,000 Guineas"
- Irish 1,000 Guineas
- American 1000 Guineas Stakes
- New Zealand 1000 Guineas
- German 1,000 Guineas
- Guineas (greyhounds), originally the 1,000 Guineas
