= R. D. Evans =

R. D. Evans may refer to:

- Robley D. Evans (admiral) (1846–1912), rear admiral of the United States Navy
- Robley D. Evans (physicist) (1907–1995), American physicist
- R. D. Evans (jockey) (fl. 1979–1990), jockey in Sixty Sails Handicap
- Robert Evans (wrestler) ("Barrister" R. D. Evans; born 1983)
