= Hawthorne Derby =

- Class: Grade III
- Location: Hawthorne Race Course; Stickney, Illinois, United States
- Inaugurated: 1965
- Race type: Thoroughbred – Flat racing
- Website: www.hawthorneracecourse.com

Race information
- Distance: 1 1/8 miles (9 furlongs)
- Surface: Turf
- Track: Left-handed
- Qualification: Three-year-olds
- Weight: Assigned
- Purse: $150,000

The Hawthorne Derby is an American Thoroughbred horse race held annually since 1965 at Hawthorne Race Course in Stickney, Illinois near Chicago. Raced in October, it is open to three-year-old horses. In 2024, it was contested for a purse of $150,000 over a distance of 1 1/8 miles on turf.

Inaugurated as the Hawthorne Diamond Jubilee in 1965 (through 1968), it was run on dirt until 1984 when it was switched to the turf course. The colt Bold Bidder, leased by John R. Gaines from owner Paul Falkenstein, won the inaugural race then the following year returned to the Hawthorne Race Course to win the 1966 Hawthorne Gold Cup. From inception, the Hawthorne Derby has been run at various distances. Since 1989, it has been set at a mile and one eighth. In 1979, the race was run at the now closed Sportsman's Park.

The race was not run in 2014, 2016, 2018, 2019, and 2020.

== Records ==
Time records:

(At current distance of 1 1/8 miles turf)

- 1:44.70 Rainbows For Life (1991)

(A course record which still stands)

(At the prior distance of 1 1/16 miles dirt)

- 1:39.60 Sensitive Prince (1978)

(A track record which still stands)

== Winners of the Hawthorne Derby since 1991 ==
Year	Winner	Jockey	Trainer	Owner	Time
2025	Anegada	Luis H. Colon	Michael J. Maker	Three Diamonds Farm	1:48.71
2024	Ak Sar Ben Derby	Axel Concepcion	John Ortiz	Millard R. Seldin Revocable Trust	1:49.30
2023	Act a Fool	Alexis Centeno	Larry Rivelli	Patricia’s Hope LLC & Richard Ravin	1:52.62
2022	Speaking Scout	Jareth Loveberry	H. Graham Motion	Eclipse Thoroughbreds Partners	1:48.80
2021	Mohs	Jareth Loveberry	Patrick B. McBurney	Dominic Bossone, Nadine Schnoor, Peter Donnelly, W. Oberdorff, & ABL Stable	1:50.32
2017	Mr. Bariley	Santo Sanjur	Anthony J. Granitz	Captain Jack Racing Stable	1:56.07
2015	Lucky Lindy	Robby Albarado	Mark R. Frostad	Augustin Stable	1:48.26
2013	Kid Dreams	Francisco C. Torres	Neil D. Drysdale	Robert S. Evans	2:01.49
2012	Two Months Rent	Jesus Lopez Castanon	James J. Toner	AJ Suited Racing Stable	1:52.58
2011	Willcox Inn	Robby Albarado	Michael Stidham	All In Stable	1:48.97
2010	Yankee Fourtune	Victor Santiago	Kiaran McLaughlin	Harvey Clark & Andrew Albstein	1:46.28
2009	Proceed Bee	Christopher Emigh	Scott Becker	William Stiritz	1:57.00
2008	Strait of Mewsina	E.T. Baird	Larry Rivelli	Richard Ravin	1:49.48
2007	Bold Hawk	Jean-Luc Samyn	James J. Toner	Patricia E. Nicholson & Justin Nicholson	1:47.45
2006	Best of Buddies	Eddie M. Martin Jr.	Michelle Boyce	Barr Three LLC	1:50.59
2005	Gun Salute	Cornelio Velásquez	William I. Mott	Brant M. Laue	1:47.51
2004	Cool Conductor	José A. Santos	William I. Mott	David E. Garner	1:47.89
2003	False Promises	Carlos Marquez Jr.	Anthony J. Granitz	David Maracich	1:48.48
2002	Scooter Roach *	Jesse Campbell	Terrel Gore	Lizabeth Gore	1:58.88
2001	Kalu	José A. Santos	Christophe Clement	Robert G. Schaedle & Bonnie Heath Farm	1:50.49
2000	Hymn (DH)	Laffit Pincay Jr.	Richard J. Lundy	Richard Nip & Scott Goldsher	1:53.79
2000	Rumsonontheriver (DH)	John S. Pregman Jr.	Alfredo J. Juarez Jr.	John S. Pregman Jr. & Gerald Goodman	1:53.79
1999	Minor Wisdom	Ramsey Zimmerman	Richie Scherer	Carolyn Friedberg	1:49.06
1998	Stay Sound	Anthony J. D'Amico	Bernard S. Flint	Richard Klein & Elaine Bertram	1:47.54
1997	River Squall	Craig Perret	Peter M. Vestal	Thomas M. Carey	1:48.20
1996	Jaunatxo	Juvenal Lopez Diaz	Louie J. Roussel, III	Louie J. Roussel, III	1:47.18
1995	Cuzzin Jeb	Charles C. Lopez	Gene A. Lotti, Jr.	Scott Young	1:48.90
1994	Chrysalis House	Mark Guidry	Harvey L. Vanier	Nancy A. Vanier, Lyda Williamson & Diane Curry	1:51.88
1993	Snake Eyes	Garrett K. Gomez	Steven L. Morguelan	Mel Isenstein	1:50.28
1992	Bantan	Curt C. Bourque	P. Noel Hickey	Irish Aces Farms	1:48.05
1991	Rainbows for Life	David Penna	James E. Day	Sam-Son Farms	1:44.70

- In 2002, Flying Dash won the race but was disqualified for use of medications banned in the state of Illinois

== Earlier winners ==
- 1990 – Tutu Tobago
- 1989 – Broto
- 1988 – Pappas Swing
- 1987 – Zaizoom
- 1986 – Autobot
- 1985 – Derby Wish
- 1984 – Pass The Line
- 1983 – St. Forbes
- 1982 – Drop Your Drawers
- 1981 – Jeremy Jet
- 1980 – Jaklin Klugman
- 1979 – Architect
- 1978 – Sensitive Prince
- 1977 – Silver series
- 1976 – Wardlaw
- 1975 – Winter Fox
- 1974 – Stonewalk
- 1973 – Golden Don
- 1972 – Feloniously
- 1971 – Northfields
- 1970 – Well Mannered
- 1969 – Oil Power
- 1968 – Te Vega
- 1967 – Gentleman James
- 1966 – Handsome Boy
- 1965 – Bold Bidder
