= Earlie Fires =

American jockey

Personal information
- Born: March 19, 1947 (age 79) Rivervale, Arkansas, U.S.
- Occupation: Jockey

Horse racing career
- Sport: Horse racing
- Career wins: 6,470

Major racing wins
- Arlington Matron Stakes (1966, 1967, 1980, 1982, 1992); Round Table Handicap (1966, 1984); Lafayette Stakes (1966); Dixie Stakes (1967); Florida Derby (1967, 1989); Hialeah Turf Cup Handicap (1967); Jersey Derby (1967); Breeders' Futurity Stakes (1968); Santa Barbara Handicap (1972); Alcibiades Stakes (1973); Laurance Armour Handicap (1975, 1977, 1979); Duchess Stakes (1976); La Prevoyante Stakes (1976); Arlington Handicap (1978, 1990); Arlington-Washington Lassie Stakes (1979); Spinster Stakes (1979); Lincoln Heritage Handicap (1980, 1984, 1988 (2x), 1993, 1994, 2003); Arlington Oaks (1981, 1982); Isaac Murphy Handicap (1981, 1992, 2008); Washington Park Handicap (1985); Alabama Stakes (1986); Ashland Stakes (1986); Gazelle Stakes (1986); Stars and Stripes Handicap (1986, 1992, 2006); Thoroughbred Club of America Stakes (1986); American Derby (1987); Fairmount Derby (1988); Pan American Handicap (1967, 1988); Phoenix Stakes (1988); Edgewood Stakes (1989); Davona Dale Stakes (1990); Broward Handicap (1990); Donn Handicap (1990); Forward Gal Stakes (1990); Sorority Stakes (1990); Ohio Derby (1992); E. P. Taylor Stakes (1993); Hanshin Cup (1993, 1994, 2007); Old Hat Stakes (1993); Sky Classic Stakes (1993); Nijinsky Stakes (1998); Pasco Stakes (2002); Purple Violet Stakes (2007)

Racing awards
- George Woolf Memorial Jockey Award (1991)

Honours
- National Museum of Racing and Hall of Fame (2001); Chicagoland Sports Hall of Fame (2007)

Significant horses
- In Reality, Tumble Wind, Abe's Hope, War Censor, Foolish Pleasure, Swinging Mood, Pattee Canyon, Sweetest Chant, Classy Cathy, Mercedes Won, Primal, One Dreamer, Buck's Boy

Earlie Stancel Fires (born March 19, 1947) is an American retired horse racing jockey.

Fires began riding professionally in 1964 and led all American apprentices in wins that year with 224. He retired on September 21, 2008, having won 6,470 races at racetracks across North America. In 1983, and again 1987, Fires set a record for Arlington Park by winning seven races in a single day of racing. He is Arlington Park's all-time leading rider with 2,886 wins and holds the record for most wins in that track's Lincoln Heritage Handicap with seven. He also has the distinction of riding in the Kentucky Derby after a 24-year hiatus, the longest gap for a jockey. He rode in the 100th Kentucky Derby in 1974 and returned to Churchill Downs in 1998, at the age of 51, to ride in the 124th Kentucky Derby.

In 1991, Fires was voted the George Woolf Memorial Jockey Award, given to a jockey who demonstrates high standards of personal and professional conduct, on and off the racetrack. He was inducted in the National Museum of Racing and Hall of Fame in 2001 and following its creation, the Chicagoland Sports Hall of Fame in 2007. He retired in 2008.

Earlie Fires' brother is trainer William H. Fires.
