= Martinez Heath =

Personal information
- Born: May 4, 1945 Warm Springs, Oregon
- Died: October 16, 2006 (aged 61) Warm Springs, Oregon
- Occupation: Jockey

Horse racing career
- Sport: Horse racing

Major racing wins
- Swaps Handicap (1966); Equipoise Mile (1967); Hawthorne Gold Cup Handicap (1968); Michigan Mile And One-Eighth Handicap (1968); SNARO Handicap (1968, 1970); Black Gold Stakes (1969); Fair Grounds Oaks (1970); Thanksgiving Handicap (1970)

Significant horses
- Nodouble

Martinez "Marty" Heath (May 4, 1945 – October 16, 2006) was a Native American jockey in thoroughbred horse racing. Born on the Warm Springs Indian Reservation in Oregon, Martinez Heath was the son of Chief Nathan Heath. His brother Delvis Heath is the current chief.

As a boy, Martinez Heath won the Oregon marbles championship. By age sixteen he had already embarked on a career as a jockey that would last twenty-five years. He began riding professionally at the Portland Meadows race track in Portland, Oregon then at other tracks in Oregon, Northern California, and the American Midwest. In 1967, he had seven wins on a single race card at the Fresno Fair Race Track in Fresno, California. Heath rode the Champion runner Nodouble to wins in the 1968 Hawthorne Gold Cup and Michigan Mile And One-Eighth Handicap (1968)

Martinez Heath died at age sixty-one in 2006 and was buried in the cemetery at the mouth of the Warm Springs River.
