= Bold Bidder =

American-bred Thoroughbred racehorse

- Sire: Bold Ruler
- Grandsire: Nasrullah
- Dam: High Bid
- Damsire: To Market
- Sex: Stallion
- Foaled: 1962
- Country: United States
- Colour: Bay
- Breeder: Wheatley Stable
- Owner: 1) Wheatley Stable; 2) August Paul & Randy Sechrest; 3) Paul Falkenstein; 4) John R. Gaines (Lesee)
- Trainer: Woody Stephens; Randy Sechrest
- Record: 33: 13–2–5
- Earnings: US$478,021

Major wins
- Benjamin Franklin Handicap (1965); Hawthorne Derby (1965); Jerome Handicap (1965); Hawthorne Gold Cup Handicap (1966); Monmouth Handicap (1966); Strub Stakes (1966); Washington Park Handicap (1966 )

Awards
- TRA Champion Handicap Male Horse (1966)

Honours
- Bold Bidder Drive, Lexington, Kentucky

Bold Bidder (March 22, 1962–1982) was an American Thoroughbred racehorse.

== Background ==
Bred by the Wheatley Stable partnership of Gladys Mills Phipps and her brother, Ogden L. Mills, Bold Bidder was sired by their great stallion Bold Ruler, an eight-time Leading sire in North America and U.S. Racing Hall of Fame inductee. He was out of the Wheatley mare High Bid. In 1952, her sire, To Market, set new track records in the Massachusetts Handicap, the Hawthorne Gold Cup and a six-furlong sprint at Santa Anita Park.

== Racing career ==
First trained by future Hall of Fame inductee Woody Stephens, Bold Bidder did not run in the Kentucky Derby. Instead, his Wheatley stablemate Bold Lad, the 1964 American Champion Two-Year-Old Colt and 1965 Derby Trial Stakes winner, was entered. Sent off as the betting favorite, Bold Lad finished tenth in an eleven-horse field. Neither horse ran in the Preakness Stakes, but Bold Bidder finished eighth in the Belmont Stakes. He was purchased by August Paul and trainer Randy Sechrest in 1965 and then sold to Paul Falkenstein who leased him for five years to John R. Gaines.

Bold Bidder won the 1966 Hawthorne Gold Cup, the Monmouth and Washington Park Handicaps, and the 1966 Strub Stakes at Santa Anita Park. In the Strub, he set a track record that stood until 1979 when his son, Spectacular Bid, broke it. Bold Bidder's performances saw him named 1966 Champion Handicap Male Horse by the Thoroughbred Racing Association with the three-year-old Buckpasser taking the rival Daily Racing Form award.

== Stud career ==
Retired to stud at Gainesway Farm in Lexington, Kentucky, Bold Bidder was an outstanding stallion. The sire of fifty-three stakes winners, he produced include two Kentucky Derby winners. Cannonade won the 1974 Derby and sired Caveat, who won the 1983 Belmont Stakes. Spectacular Bid, a Hall of Fame inductee who in addition to winning the Derby and the Preakness Stakes, was the 1978 American Champion Two-Year-Old Colt, the 1979 American Champion Three-Year-Old Male Horse, the 1980 American Horse of the Year and ranked number 10 in the Blood-Horse magazine List of the Top 100 U.S. Racehorses of the 20th Century.

Bold Bidder also sired champions Highest Trump (Ireland), Rash Move (Sovereign Award, Canada), Caspian (England), and Parioli (France). He was the sire of Consultants Bid, who sired U.S. Racing Hall of Fame filly Bayakoa. From his daughters, Bold Bidder was the damsire of two American Champion Two-Year-Old Fillys. In 1982, Champion Landaluce went undefeated in five starts but died in November of an intestinal infection. In 1992, Champion Eliza won the 1992 Santa Anita Oaks and Breeders' Cup Juvenile Fillies.

Bold Bidder died in 1982 and was buried in the equine cemetery at Gainesway Farm.
