= King's Bishop =

American-bred Thoroughbred racehorse

- Sire: Round Table
- Grandsire: Princequillo
- Dam: Spearfish
- Damsire: Fleet Nasrullah
- Sex: Stallion
- Foaled: May 11, 1969
- Country: United States
- Colour: Bay
- Breeder: Warner L. Jones Jr.
- Owner: Craig F. Cullinan Jr. Bohemia Stable
- Trainer: Thomas J. Kelly; H. Allen Jerkens (1973)
- Record: 28: 11-4-3
- Earnings: $308,079

Major wins
- Michigan Mile And One-Eighth Handicap (1972); Grand Prix Stakes (1972); Round Table Handicap (1972); Carter Handicap (1973); Fall Highweight Handicap (1973)

Honors
- King's Bishop Stakes at Saratoga Race Course

King's Bishop (1969–1981) was an American Thoroughbred racehorse.

== Background ==
King's Bishop was a bay horse bred in Kentucky by Warner L. Jones Jr. He was sired by U.S. Racing Hall of Fame inductee Round Table. He was out of the mare Spearfish, a descendant of Nearco.

King's Bishop was owned by Craig F. Cullinan Jr., founding president of the Houston Astros Major League Baseball club, who purchased him as a yearling at the Keeneland Sales for $72,000.

== Racing career ==
Cullinan raced King's Bishop through 1972, then sold him to Allaire du Pont. She raced him in 1973 under the nom de course Bohemia Stable. King's Bishop won several important Graded stakes races and on May 19, 1973, he set a Belmont Park track record of 1:20 2/5 for seven furlongs in winning the Carter Handicap. King's Bishop retired from racing with a record of eleven wins in twenty-eight starts.

In 1984 Saratoga Race Course created the King's Bishop Stakes in his memory. In 2017, the race was renamed to honor U.S. Racing Hall of Fame trainer H. Allen Jerkens.

== Pedigree ==
Pedigree of King's Bishop, bay stallion, 1969
Sire Round Table	Princequillo	Prince Rose	Rose Prince
Sire Round Table	Princequillo	Prince Rose	Indolence
Sire Round Table	Princequillo	Cosquilla	Papyrus
Sire Round Table	Princequillo	Cosquilla	Quick Thought
Sire Round Table	Knight's Daughter	Sir Cosmo	The Boss
Sire Round Table	Knight's Daughter	Sir Cosmo	Ayn Hali
Sire Round Table	Knight's Daughter	Feola	Friar Marcus
Sire Round Table	Knight's Daughter	Feola	Aloe
Dam Spearfish	Fleet Nasrullah	Nasrullah	Nearco
Dam Spearfish	Fleet Nasrullah	Nasrullah	Mumtaz Begum
Dam Spearfish	Fleet Nasrullah	Happy Go Fleet	Count Fleet
Dam Spearfish	Fleet Nasrullah	Happy Go Fleet	Draeh
Dam Spearfish	Alabama Gal	Determine	Alibhai
Dam Spearfish	Alabama Gal	Determine	Koubis
Dam Spearfish	Alabama Gal	Trojan Class	Priam
Dam Spearfish	Alabama Gal	Trojan Class	Rompers (family: 11)
