= Commonwealth Stakes =

- Class: Grade III
- Location: Keeneland Racecourse; Lexington, Kentucky
- Inaugurated: 1987 (as Commonwealth Breeders' Cup Stakes)
- Race type: Thoroughbred – Flat racing
- Website: www.keeneland.com/racing

Race information
- Distance: 7 furlongs
- Surface: Dirt
- Track: left-handed
- Qualification: Four-years-old and older
- Weight: 123 lbs with allowances
- Purse: US$350,000 (2025)

The Commonwealth Stakes is a Grade III American Thoroughbred horse race for horses that are four years old or older, over a distance of seven furlongs on the dirt held annually in early April at Keeneland Race Course, Lexington, Kentucky during the spring meeting. The event currently carries a purse of $350,000.

== History ==
The inaugural running of the event was on 16 October 1987, during Keeneland's fall meeting as the Commonwealth Breeders' Cup Stakes as a six furlong dirt sprint for three year olds and older and was won by Exclusive Enough who was ridden by US Hall of Fame jockey Mike E. Smith. Exclusive Enough equaled the track record with his winning time of 1:08 4/5 and to date is the only three year old to have won the event.

Between 1987 and 2007, the Breeders' Cup sponsored the event which reflected in the name of the event.

Two years later, in 1989 Keeneland moved the event to their spring meeting in April and increased the distance to seven furlongs and changed the conditions of the event to only allow four year olds and older.

The following year in 1990 the event was upgraded to Grade III status and in 1994 the event was upgraded once more Grade II.

Between 2007 and 2014 the event was held on the synthetic Polytrack surface.

In 2013 the event was downgraded to a Grade III event.

The event was not held 2020 during Keeneland's spring meeting which was moved to July and shortened due to the COVID-19 pandemic in the United States.

== Records ==
Speed record

- 1:20.40 – Distorted Humor (1998)

Margins

- 6 lengths – Calestoga (1988)

Most wins

- 2 – Black Tie Affair (1990, 1991)

Most wins by a jockey

- 3 – Edgar Prado (2001, 2003, 2008)
- 3 – Joel Rosario (2012, 2017, 2021)

Most wins by a trainer

- 3 – Todd A. Pletcher (2003, 2004, 2011)

Most wins by an owner

- 2 – Jeff Sullivan (1990, 1991)
- 2 – Michael B. Tabor (2003, 2004)

== Winners ==
Year	Winner	Age	Jockey	Trainer	Owner	Distance	Time	Purse	Grade	Ref
Commonwealth Stakes
2026	Saudi Crown	6	Flavien Prat	Brad H. Cox	FMQ Stables	7 furlongs	1:22.56	$340,125	III	
2025	Extra Anejo	5	Flavien Prat	Steven M. Asmussen	Winchell Thoroughbreds	7 furlongs	1:23.63	$350,000	III	
2024	Bo Cruz	4	Jose L. Ortiz	Albert Stall Jr.	Roger Cettina, Brian Pagano, Patrick Grippo, Peter Martine & Bruno De Julio	7 furlongs	1:22.94	$294,500	III	
2023	Here Mi Song	5	Alex Achard	William Stinson Jr.	Nathan Hayden	7 furlongs	1:23.42	$300,000	III	
2022	Prevalence	4	Tyler Gaffalione	Brendan Walsh	Godolphin Racing	7 furlongs	1:22.47	$300,000	III	
2021	Flagstaff	7	Joel Rosario	John W. Sadler	Lane's End Racing & Hronis Racing	7 furlongs	1:22.80	$200,000	III	
2020	Race not held									
2019	Bobby's Wicked One	4	Miguel Mena	Albert Stall Jr.	Autumn Hill Farms Racing Stables	7 furlongs	1:22.80	$250,000	III	
2018	Warrior's Club	4	Luis Contreras	D. Wayne Lukas	Churchill Downs Racing Club	7 furlongs	1:22.61	$250,000	III	
2017	Awesome Slew	4	Joel Rosario	Mark E. Casse	Live Oak Plantation	7 furlongs	1:22.31	$250,000	III	
2016	Ami's Flatter	4	Martin Garcia	Josie Carroll	Ivan Dalos	7 furlongs	1:21.66	$250,000	III	
2015	Kobe's Back	4	Gary L. Stevens	Peter Eurton	C R K Stable	7 furlongs	1:22.16	$300,000	III	
2014	Occasional View	6	Alan Garcia	Kenneth G. McPeek	Robert Trussell	7 furlongs	1:22.77	$175,000	III	
2013	Handsome Mike	4	Mario Gutierrez	Doug F. O'Neill	Reddam Racing	7 furlongs	1:23.14	$175,000	III	
2012	Lonesome Street	5	Joel Rosario	Michael J. Maker	Kenneth & Sarah Ramsey	7 furlongs	1:21.17	$175,000	II	
2011	Aikenite	4	John R. Velazquez	Todd A. Pletcher	Dogwood Stable	7 furlongs	1:22.35	$175,000	II	
2010	Together Indy	4	Kent J. Desormeaux	George Weaver	Raymond A. Hill Stable & Vic Fontana	7 furlongs	1:22.34	$245,000	II	
2009	Eternal Star	5	Eibar Coa	Michael J. Trombetta	Harry C. & Tom O. Meyerhoff	7 furlongs	1:21.17	$203,500	II	
2008	Rebellion (GB)	5	Edgar S. Prado	H. Graham Motion	Hickory Tree Stables	7 furlongs	1:21.40	$390,000	II	
Commonwealth Breeders' Cup Stakes
2007	Silent Name (JPN)	5	Corey Nakatani	Gary Mandella	Stronach Stables & Wertheimer et Frère	7 furlongs	1:21.26	$400,000	II	
2006	Sun King	4	Corey Nakatani	Nicholas P. Zito	Tracy Farmer	7 furlongs	1:23.30	$443,200	II	
2005	Clock Stopper	5	Jerry D. Bailey	Dallas Stewart	Overbrook Farm	7 furlongs	1:22.06	$424,900	II	
2004	Lion Tamer	4	Mike E. Smith	Todd A. Pletcher	Michael B. Tabor	7 furlongs	1:23.14	$270,250	II	
2003	Smooth Jazz	4	Edgar S. Prado	Todd A. Pletcher	Michael B. Tabor	7 furlongs	1:21.73	$273,750	II	
2002	Orientate	4	Pat Day	D. Wayne Lukas	Beverly J. & Robert B. Lewis	7 furlongs	1:21.54	$272,000	II	
2001	Alannan	5	Edgar S. Prado	Carl A. Nafzger	Eaglestone Farm	7 furlongs	1:22.39	$270,750	II	
2000	Richter Scale	6	Richard Migliore	Mary Jo Lohmeier	Nancy & Rcichard S, Kaster & Nathan Fox	7 furlongs	1:21.07	$207,800	II	
1999	Good and Tough	4	Shane Sellers	Frank A. Alexander	David P. Reynolds	7 furlongs	1:22.09	$201,300	II	
1998	Distorted Humor	5	Gary L. Stevens	W. Elliott Walden	Russell L. Reineman & Prestonwood Farm	7 furlongs	1:20.40	$211,000	II	
1997	Victor Cooley	4	Eddie Martin Jr.	Mark R. Frostad	Windways Farm	7 furlongs	1:22.40	$208,600	II	
1996	Afternoon Deelites	4	Kent J. Desormeaux	Richard E. Mandella	Burt Bacharach	7 furlongs	1:21.00	$211,400	II	
1995	Golden Gear	4	Craig Perret	Doug Matthews	Barry Golden	7 furlongs	1:22.00	$210,900	II	
1994	Memo (CHI)	7	Paul Atkinson	Richard E. Mandella	Stud Panter	7 furlongs	1:22.20	$149,900	II	
1993	Alydeed	4	Craig Perret	Roger L. Attfield	Kinghaven Farms	7 furlongs	1:21.40	$182,350	III	
1992	Pleasant Tap	5	Eddie Delahoussaye	Christopher Speckert	Buckland Farm	7 furlongs	1:22.40	$161,750	III	
1991	Black Tie Affair (IRE)	5	Juvenal Lopez Diaz	Ernie T. Poulos	Jeff Sullivan	7 furlongs	1:21.80	$182,500	III	
1990	Black Tie Affair (IRE)	4	Mark Guidry	Ernie T. Poulos	Jeff Sullivan	7 furlongs	1:22.00	$175,500	III	
1989	Sewickley	4	Randy Romero	Flint S. Schulhofer	Robert S. Evans	7 furlongs	1:22.40	$155,950	Listed	
1988	Calestoga	6	Don Brumfield	Neil B. Boyce	N. & M. Boyce Racing Stable	6 furlongs	1:09.40	$156,350		
1987	Exclusive Enough	3	Mike E. Smith	Jack Van Berg	Dorothy Scharbauer	6 furlongs	1:08.40	$155,400		

Legend:
All Weather Track Dirt

== See also ==
- List of American and Canadian Graded races
