= Smarty Jones Stakes (Oaklawn Park) =

- Class: Listed
- Location: Oaklawn Park Race Track; Hot Springs, Arkansas, United States
- Inaugurated: 2008
- Race type: Thoroughbred – Flat racing
- Website: www.oaklawn.com

Race information
- Distance: 1 1/16 mile (8.5 furlongs)
- Surface: Dirt
- Track: Left-handed
- Qualification: Three-year-olds
- Weight: 124 lbs with allowances
- Purse: $250,000 (2022)

The Smarty Jones Stakes is a Listed American Thoroughbred horse race for 3-year-olds contested on dirt at a distance of one mile (8 furlongs) run annually in mid-January at Oaklawn Park Race Track in Hot Springs, Arkansas. The Smarty Jones is worth $150,000.

== History ==
Named for the 2004 Kentucky Derby and Preakness Stakes winner, Smarty Jones, the inaugural race was held on January 21, 2008.

It is the first in a series of races – including the Southwest Stakes, Rebel Stakes, and Arkansas Derby – held at Oaklawn that are commonly used as preps for the Kentucky Derby.

Note that a second Smarty Jones Stakes, a Grade 3 race for 3-year-olds run at a distance of 1 and 1/16 miles, was created in 2010 and is held at Parx in late August or during Labor Day weekend.

Since 2013 the event is part of the Road to the Kentucky Derby with qualification points given to the first four placegetters.

== Records ==
Speed record:

- 1 mile: 1:36.32 – Uncontested (2017)

Speed record:

- 10 1/4 lengths - Caddo River (2021)

Most wins by a jockey:

- 2 – Eusebio Razo Jr. (2008, 2011)
- 2 – Jon Court (2013, 2016)

Most wins by a trainer:

- 3 – Brad H. Cox (2021, 2023, 2024)

Most wins by an owner:

- 2 – Robert V. LaPenta (2015, 2017)
- 2 – Harry T. Rosenblum (2015, 2017)

== Winners ==
Year	Winner	Jockey	Trainer	Owner	Time
2026	Strategic Risk	Javier Castellano	Mark E. Casse	John C. Oxley	1:45.06
2025	Coal Battle	Juan P. Vargas	Lonnie Briley	Norman Stables LLC	1:46.43
2024	Catching Freedom	Cristian A. Torres	Brad H. Cox	Albaugh Family Stables	1:44.59
2023	Victory Formation	Flavien Prat	Brad H. Cox	Spendthrift Farm & Frank Fletcher Racing Operations Inc.	1:38.14
2022	Dash Attack	David Cohen	Kenneth G. McPeek	Catalyst Stable, Madalena Racing, Kevin Pollard and Patty Slevin	1:39.44
2021	Caddo River	Florent Geroux	Brad H. Cox	Shortleaf Stable	1:38.19
2020	Gold Street	Martin Garcia	Steven M. Asmussen	Mike McCarty	1:39.63
2019	Gray Attempt	Shaun Bridgmohan	William H. Fires	Dwight Pruett	1:36.94
2018	Mourinho	Drayden Van Dyke	Bob Baffert	Phoenix Thoroughbred III	1:37.25
2017	Uncontested	Channing Hill	Wayne M. Catalano	Robert V. LaPenta & Harry T. Rosenblum	1:36.32
2016	Discreetness	Jon Court	William H. Fires	Xpress Thoroughbreds	1:38.05
2015	Far Right	Mike E. Smith	Ron Moquett	Robert V. LaPenta & Harry T. Rosenblum	1:38.43
2014	Tanzanite Cat	Norberto Arroyo Jr.	Cody Autrey	James & Ywachetta Driver	1:38.69
2013	Will Take Charge	Jon Court	D. Wayne Lukas	Willis Horton	1:38.64
2012	Junebugred	Joe Bravo	Steve Hobby	Alex & JoAnn Lieblong	1:38.45
2011	Caleb's Posse	Eusebio Razo Jr.	Donnie K. Von Hemel	McNeill Stables & Cheyenne Stables	1:43.07
2010	Dryfly	Calvin Borel	Lynn S. Whiting	Charles J. Cella	1:41.69
2009	Flat Out	Julio A. Garcia	Charles L. Dickey	Oxbow Racing LLC (Art & Stephanie Preston)	1:39.15
2008	Liberty Bull	Eusebio Razo Jr.	Thomas M. Amoss	Kenneth Maier	1:38.15

== See also ==
- Road to the Kentucky Derby
