= Crimson Satan =

American-bred Thoroughbred racehorse

- Sire: Spy Song
- Grandsire: Balladier
- Dam: Papila
- Damsire: Requiebro
- Sex: Stallion
- Foaled: 1959
- Country: United States
- Colour: Chestnut
- Breeder: Crimson King Farm
- Owner: Crimson King Farm (Peter W. Salmen, Sr.)
- Trainer: Gordon R. Potter; Charles Kerr (9/62) & J. W. King; Martin L. Fallon, Jr. (10/63)
- Record: 58: 18-9-9
- Earnings: US$796,077

Major wins
- Garden State Stakes (1961); Hawthorne Juvenile Stakes (1961); Pimlico Futurity (1961); Lafayette Stakes (1961); Laurance Armour Handicap (1962); Clark Handicap (1962); San Fernando Stakes (1963); Charles H. Strub Stakes (1963); Massachusetts Handicap (1963); Washington Park Handicap (1963); Michigan Mile And One-Sixteenth Handicap (1963)

Awards
- American Champion Two-Year-Old Colt (1961)

Crimson Satan (1959–1982) was an American Thoroughbred Champion racehorse.

== Background ==
Crimson Satan was a chestnut horse bred and raced by Peter W. Salmen Sr.'s Crimson King Farm at Lexington, Kentucky. His dam was Salmen's Argentine-bred mare Papila, and his sire was Charles Fisher's good runner Spy Song.

== Racing career ==
Trained in his two-year-old season by Gordon Potter, Crimson Satan earned 1961 American Champion Two-Year-Old Colt honors.

At age three, Crimson Satan competed in each of the U.S. Triple Crown races. He finished sixth in the Kentucky Derby, seventh in the Preakness Stakes, and a close third in the Belmont Stakes. In an overall difficult year, the colt won the 1962 Clark Handicap but was disqualified from his win in the Jersey Derby and set back to third. He won the June 23 Leonard Richards Stakes at Delaware Park Racetrack, but the win was negated following a positive drug test. As a result, trainer Potter was suspended for the remainder of 1962, and Charles Kerr took over as the trainer of Crimson Satan in September 1962.

Racing at age four in 1963, Crimson Satan earned five wins and five seconds in major stakes races at tracks across the United States. While racing in California, where he won the San Fernando Stakes and Charles H. Strub Stakes, he was handled by Kerr's assistant, J. W. King. He also had wins in Chicago's Washington Park Handicap and Boston's Massachusetts Handicap and set a new track record of 1:40 3/5 on dirt in winning the Michigan Mile And One-Sixteenth Handicap at Detroit. In October 1963, Martin Fallon took over as trainer but after disappointing results, Crimson Satan was retired in early 1964.

== Stud record ==
Crimson Satan stood at stud at his birthplace in Lexington, Kentucky. Although a successful sire of numerous stakes winners such as Brilliant Sandy and Krislin, he is best remembered as the damsire of the 1990 Breeders' Cup Mile winner Royal Academy as well as multiple Graded stakes winners Terlingua and Mt. Livermore. Bred to Nijinsky, Crimson Satan's daughter Crimson Saint produced Laa Etaab, who sold at the 1985 Keeneland yearling sale for $7,000,000.

Crimson Satan died in 1982 and is buried at Crimson King Farm in Lexington, Kentucky.
