= Black Tie Affair =

Irish-bred Thoroughbred racehorse

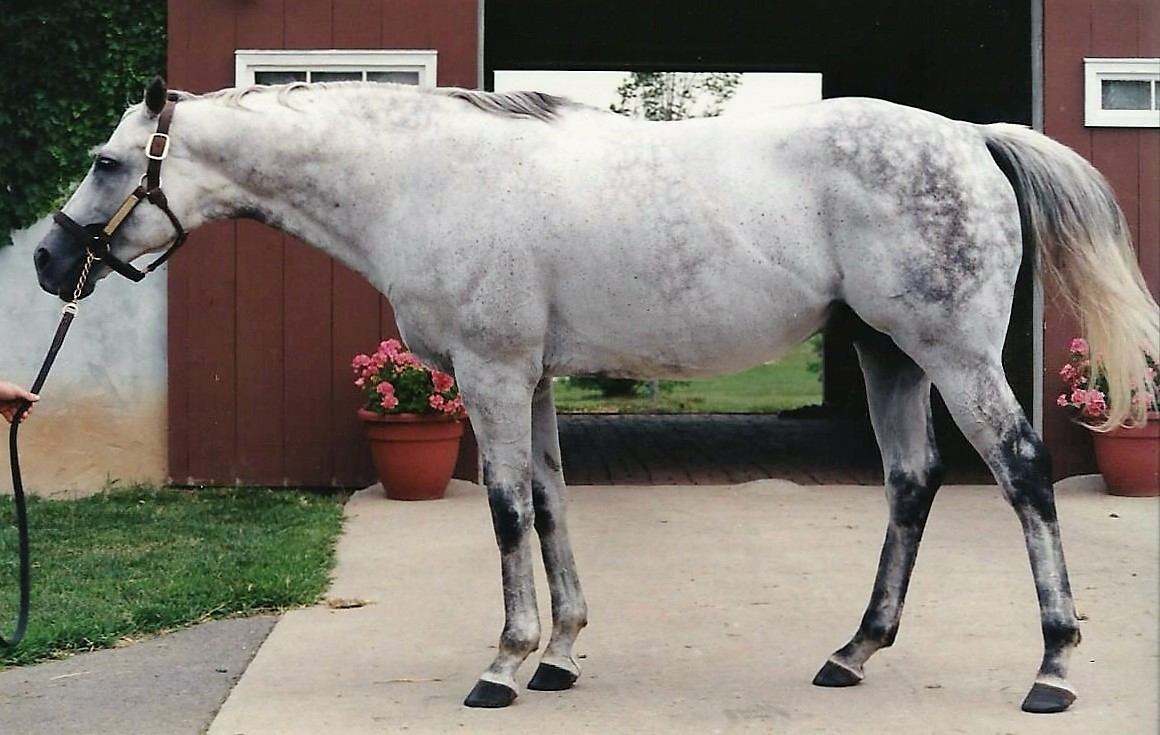
- Black Tie Affair at stud in 1996
- Sire: Miswaki
- Grandsire: Mr. Prospector
- Dam: Hat Tab Girl
- Damsire: Al Hattab
- Sex: Stallion
- Foaled: April 1, 1986
- Died: July 1, 2010 (aged 24)
- Country: Ireland
- Colour: Gray
- Breeder: Stephen D. Peskoff
- Owner: Edward P. Swyer; Jeffrey Sullivan (at age 3)
- Trainer: Walter Reese; Ernie T. Poulos (at age 3)
- Record: 45: 18-9-6
- Earnings: $3,370,694

Major wins
- Malus Stakes (1988); Sheridan Stakes (1989); Equipoise Mile Handicap (1990); Commonwealth Breeders' Cup Stakes (1990, 1991); Hawthorne Gold Cup Handicap (1990); Cornhusker Breeders' Cup Handicap (1991); Michigan Mile And One-Eighth Handicap (1991); Stephen Foster Handicap (1991); Philip H. Iselin Handicap (1991); Washington Park Handicap (1991) Breeders' Cup wins: Breeders' Cup Classic (1991)

Awards
- American Horse of the Year (1991)
- Last updated on August 6, 2006

Black Tie Affair (April 1, 1986 – July 1, 2010) was a thoroughbred racehorse. Bred by American businessman Stephen D. Peskoff, he was out of the mare Hat Tab Girl and sired by Miswaki, who also sired Prix de l'Arc de Triomphe winner Urban Sea and who was a two-time Leading broodmare sire in Great Britain & Ireland.

Black Tie Affair was brought to the United States, where he was kept as a yearling at Cynthia and Walter Reese's Timber Creek Farm in New Jersey. Reese trained the colt as a 2-year-old for Edward P. Sawyer of Hudson River Farm before Black Tie Affair was sold to Jeffrey Sullivan in 1989 for $125,000 as a three-year-old on the advice of trainer Ernie T. Poulos.

Black Tie Affair was a graded stakes race winner at two, three, four, and five and earned United States Horse of the Year in 1991 along with winning the Breeders' Cup Classic that year at Churchill Downs in a wire-to-wire victory over Twilight Agenda and Unbridled with Jerry Bailey aboard.

== Retirement ==
Black Tie Affair was originally retired in 1992 to Kentucky and then was sent to Japan in 1997 for stud duty. In 2003, there was some worry that he might meet the same fate as the great Ferdinand, who was reportedly sent to the slaughterhouse in Japan when his stud career was over. Instead, with the help of several people, from turf enthusiasts to prominent businessmen, Black Tie Affair's ex-trainer's wife, Dee Poulos, started a campaign to bring him back to the United States.

Black Tie Affair was retired to Old Friends Equine in Georgetown, KY. He was humanely euthanized at Old Friends on July 1, 2010, due to laminitis.

His best-known progeny are Evening Attire, Formal Gold, and the multiple stakes-winning filly License Fee, along with the Japanese winners Washington Color and Today's Affair.

== Notes ==
- Pedigree & Partial Stats
- TB Times Stallion Directory
- "Black Tie Affair Heads Home". Chicago Sun-Times. 7 August 2003.
- TB Times Black Tie Affair is Back
- Video at YouTube of Black Tie Affair's win in the 1991 Breeders Cup Classic
