= Isaac Murphy Handicap =

- Class: Restricted
- Location: Arlington Park; Arlington Heights, Illinois
- Inaugurated: 1976
- Race type: Thoroughbred - Flat racing
- Website: www.arlingtonpark.com

Race information
- Distance: 6 furlong sprint
- Surface: Polytrack
- Track: left-handed
- Qualification: Fillies & Mares, three-years-old & up (Bred in the State of Illinois)
- Weight: Handicap
- Purse: $54,500 (2016)

The Isaac Murphy Handicap is an American Thoroughbred horse race held annually in late June at Arlington Park racetrack in a suburb of Chicago, Illinois. The race is run on Polytrack synthetic dirt and is open to fillies and mares, age three and older who were bred in the State of Illinois.

The race is named in honor of Isaac Burns Murphy, a U.S. Racing Hall of Fame jockey whom the Hall says "is considered one of the greatest race riders in American history." Isaac Murphy raced in Chicago and won the city's then very prestigious American Derby on four occasions.

The race was run as the Isaac Murphy Memorial Handicap from its inception in 1976 through 1980. Inaugurated at a distance of 1 1/8 miles on turf, since then it has been contested at various distances on both turf and dirt:

On turf: 1976, 1991–1996

- 1 1/8 miles : 1976
- 1 1/16 miles: 1991-1996

On dirt: 1977, 1980–1990, 1997 to present

- 6 furlongs : 1986, 1997 to present
- 7 furlongs : 1987-1990
- 1 mile : 1977, 1980–85
- 1 1/8 miles : 1978-79

The race was restricted to three-year-old horses from 1980 through 1985 and again between 1991 and 1994. For 1983 only, it was limited to colts and geldings only. There were no state-bred restrictions prior to 1980 nor during the period from 1986 through 1996.

There was no running of the Isaac Murphy Handicap in 1988, 1995, 1998 and 1999.

== Records ==
Speed record: (at current distance of 6 furlongs)

- 1:08.00 - Taylor's Special (1986)

Most wins:

- 2 - Taylor's Special (1986, 1987)

Most wins by a jockey:

- 2 - Earlie Fires (1981, 1992)
- 2 - Pat Day (1986, 1987)
- 2 - Carlos Silva (1991, 2004)
- 2 - James Graham (2005, 2007)

Most wins by a trainer:

- 2 - William I. Mott (1986, 1987)

Most wins by an owner:

- 2 - William F. Lucas (1986, 1987)

== Winners of the Isaac Murphy Handicap ==
Year	Winner	Age	Jockey	Trainer	Owner	Time
2016	Puntsville	4	Victor Santiago	Michele Boyce	S. D. Brilie, Ltd.	1:10.87
2015	Royal Posh	7	Santo Sanjur	Steve Manley	Larry Owens	1:12:80
2014	Fire Tricks	5	Eduardo E. Perez	Sharon Wilson	Meryl J. Squires-Cannon	1:11.58
2013	Kip Berries	7			Tom Swearingen Racing Stable	1:10.94
2012	Third Chance	4	Francisco C. Torres	James P. DiVito	Magers/Marcocchio	1:10.92
2011	Wild Hope	4	Tanner Riggs	Frank J. Kirby	Gary & Beth Leverton	1:12.42
2010	Secret Kin	6	Jesus Castanon	Michael Stidham	Michael Stidham	1:11.32
2009	Nicks	5	James Graham	Christine Janks	Carson Springs Farm	1:10.62
2008	Magnetic Miss	4	Carlos Silva	Joseph E. Broussard	Richard Rudolph/Michael Vranich	1:09.78
2007	Modjadji	5	James Graham	Christine Janks	Arbaway Farm et al.	1:10.91
2006	Bluesbdancing	4	Eusebio Razo, Jr.	Terrel Gore	Bob & Nancy Bartels	1:10.26
2005	Jaguar City	5	James Graham	Frank R. Springer	Jaguar on the Run Stable	1:10.82
2004	Dharma Girl	5	Carlos Silva	Richard Hazelton	Ben Barnow	1:10.28
2003	Summer Mis	4	Larry Sterling, Jr.	Anthony Mitchell	Otto Stables Inc.	1:10.62
2002	Come September	6	Alfredo Juarez, Jr.	Joseph P. McKellar	L. J. Gaudreau/L. Gillen	1:10.64
2001	Rain Boots	4	Eduardo Perez	Tom Dorris	David Halfacher	1:11.20
2000	Capitol View	5	Christopher Emigh	Ronald O. Goodridge	John Conforti	1:11.26
1999	no race					
1998	no race					
1997	Miss Delovely	4	Curt Bourque	Harvey L. Vanier	Nancy A. Vanier	1:11.26
1996	Lady Lodger	5	Ron Warren, Jr.	Brent Sumja	T. Webber, Jr.	1:41.55
1995	no race					
1994	Star Campaigner	3	Aaron Gryder	Louis Roussel III	Louis Roussel III	1:43.47
1993	Snake Eyes	3	Wigberto Ramos	Steve Morguelan	M. Isenstein	1:47.27
1992	Nijinsky's Gold	3	Earlie Fires	G. Romero	Stanton P. Powell	1:43.11
1991	Al Bing	3	Carlos Silva	Gene A. Cilio	Crown's Way Farm	1:43.58
1990	Beau Genius	4	Ricardo Lopez	Gerald S. Bennett	Brian Davidson	1:21.40
1989	Carborundum	5	Jamie Bruin	Steven C. Penrod	Hermitage Farm	1:25.00
1988	no race					
1987	Taylor's Special	6	Pat Day	William I. Mott	William F. Lucas	1:22.00
1986	Taylor's Special	5	Pat Day	William I. Mott	William F. Lucas	1:08.00
1985	Magic North	3	Gerland Gallitano	Rickey Harris	C. & T. Tribble	1:37.40
1984	Raja Native	3	Carlos Marquez	James Garrard	G. R. Bunn	1:36.60
1983	Le Cou Cou	3	Don Howard	Jon Arnett	D. B. Clark	1:37.40
1982	Noted	3	Randy Romero	Herb Stevens	Preston W. Madden et al.	1:36.40
1981	Tri Crown	3	Earlie Fires	B. Hickman	N. Cutlich	1:35.80
1980	Earlstone	3	Darrell Haire	J. Gural	Hickory Knoll Stable	1:36.80
1979	Hold Your Tricks	4	E. C. Aguirre	J. Johnson	Mabar Farm	1:48.40
1978	Romeo	5	H. Eddie Arroyo	Paul T. Adwell	M. L. Cashman	1:52.40
1977	Always Gallant	3	Eddie Delahoussaye	W. Smith	Joseph W. LaCroix	1:35.60
1976	Victorian Prince	6	Sandy Hawley	Michael Whittingham	Grovetree Stable	1:50.20
