= Sun Beau =

American-bred Thoroughbred racehorse

- Sun Beau, by Franklin Brooke Voss
- Sire: Sun Briar
- Grandsire: Sundridge
- Dam: Beautiful Lady
- Damsire: Fair Play
- Sex: Stallion
- Foaled: 1925
- Country: United States
- Colour: Bay
- Breeder: Willis Sharpe Kilmer
- Owner: Willis Sharpe Kilmer; Racing silks: Green, Brown Sash, Orange sleeves, Green Cap.
- Trainer: Henry McDaniel; Charles W. Carroll; Andrew G. Blakely (1928); William A. "Doc" Crawford; Andy Schuttinger (1931); Jack Whyte (at age 6)
- Record: 74: 33-12-10
- Earnings: $376,744

Major wins
- Potomac Handicap (1928); Maryland Handicap (1928); Latonia Championship Stakes (1928); Havre de Grace Handicap (1929); Hawthorne Gold Cup (1929, 1930, 1931); Washington Handicap (1929, 1930); Aqueduct Handicap (1929); Toronto Autumn Cup (1930); Lincoln Handicap (1931); Philadelphia Handicap (1931); Arlington Handicap (1931)

Awards
- U.S. Champion Older Male Horse (1929, 1930, 1931)

Honours
- United States Racing Hall of Fame (1996); Virginia Thoroughbred Hall of Fame (1988) #93 - Top 100 U.S. Racehorses of the 20th Century; Sun Beau Stakes at Hawthorne Race Course

Sun Beau (1925 – c.1943) was an American Thoroughbred Champion Hall of Fame racehorse.

== Background ==
Sun Beau was sired by Sun Briar. His damsire was Fair Play, who sired Man o' War.

== Racing career ==
Racing as a two-year-old in 1927, Sun Beau developed slowly, winning only once in four starts. Trained by Charles W. Carroll, at age three, he finished 11th in the 1928 Kentucky Derby and 5th in the Preakness Stakes under jockey John Craigmyle. However, Sun Beau began to show improvement and wound up the season with eight wins. At age four, the colt set a record for a 1¼ mile race while winning the first of three consecutive Hawthorne Gold Cup Handicaps at Hawthorne Race Course near Chicago. Several more important victories earned him the first of three straight U.S. Champion Older Male Horse titles. At the end of his racing career, Sun Beau's total earnings were $376,744.

Sun Beau continued to race at ages five and six, winning nine races in each year, the most of any year he had raced. He retired as the all-time leader in race earnings. During his five-year career, he had eight trainers.

== Stud record ==
Sun Beau was sent to stud duty at his owner's Remlik Farm near Urbanna, Virginia. He sired few stakes winners, none of which achieved his level of success. The last of his progeny was born in 1944. He died in 1943.

== Honors ==
In 1996, Sun Beau was inducted into the National Museum of Racing and Hall of Fame.
