= Richard L. Duchossois =

American businessman (1921–2022)

- Born: Richard Louis Duchossois; October 7, 1921; Chicago, Illinois, U.S.
- Died: January 28, 2022 (aged 100); Barrington Hills, Illinois, U.S.
- Education: Morgan Park Academy, Washington and Lee University
- Occupations: business executive with The Duchossois Group, Inc., Arlington Park, Churchill Downs
- Board member of: The Duchossois Group, Inc., TCMC, Inc., National Thoroughbred Racing Association
- Spouse(s): 1) Beverly Thrall; 2) Judi
- Children: Craig J., Dayle, Bruce, Kim
- Relatives: (Grandchild), Elliot Struckmeyer (Grandchild) Henry Green
- Awards: 2 Bronze Stars, Purple Heart, American Jockey Club Gold Medal, Special Sovereign Award (1988), Lord Derby Award, Palmer Award for Meritorious Service to Racing; Eclipse Award of Merit (2003); Chicagoland Sports Hall of Fame; United States Racing Hall of Fame, Pillar of the Turf (2019)

Richard Louis Duchossois (/ˈdʌtʃəswɑː/; October 7, 1921 – January 28, 2022) was an American businessman and racehorse owner. He was the founder and chairman of The Duchossois Group, Inc., a family-owned company headquartered in Elmhurst, Illinois that had ownership stakes in Arlington Park and Churchill Downs race tracks, and did rail car and defense manufacturing.

== Early life and education ==
Duchossois was the son of Ernestine (Hoessler) and Alphonse Duchossois. He graduated from Morgan Park Military Academy and attended Washington and Lee University, before starting active military service during World War II.

== Military career ==
He served in five European campaigns, including Normandy where he was a commander with the 610th Tank Destroyer Battalion of the United States Army. He served as the military governor for the region of Eichstätt and attained the rank of Major before he was released from active service in 1946. He received a Purple Heart for his injuries in combat at the Moselle River.

== Career ==
Richard Duchossois joined Thrall Car Manufacturing Company after World War II and became CEO in 1952. In 1980, the firm purchased Chamberlain Manufacturing Corp. which makes garage door openers, with Duchossois becoming its chairman. At the same time, he retained the chairmanship of the parent company, but appointed his son, Craig, as CEO. The Thrall rail car manufacturer was sold in 2001, and the defense business was sold in 2004.

In 1983, as Chairman of renamed Duchossois Industries (DII), he purchased Arlington Park Race Track. In 2000, Arlington Park merged with Churchill Downs Incorporated, where DII has several seats on the board of directors.

He also owned Des Moines TV Station KDSM-TV (formerly KCBR-TV) from 1983 to 1991.

He served as a director of TCMC, Inc., the Emirates World Series of Racing, and the Thoroughbred Racing Association.

The Chamberlain Group was divested to Blackstone Inc in 2021.

== Personal life and death ==
He married his high school sweetheart, Beverly Thrall. His son Craig J. Duchossois is chief executive officer of The Duchossois Group, Inc. and served as chairman of the Board of Visitors of the United States Naval Academy. Duchossois celebrated his 100th birthday in October 2021, and died on January 28, 2022, in Barrington Hills, Illinois.

== Awards and honors ==
He received a Purple Heart and two Bronze Stars for his military service in World War II.

His awards include the 1986 American Jockey Club's Gold Medal, the 1988 Special Sovereign Award from the Jockey Club of Canada, and Lord Derby Award from the Horserace Writers and Reporters Association of Great Britain, the Joe Palmer Award for Meritorious Service to Racing from the National Turf Writers Association, the 2003 Eclipse Award of Merit, and in 2019 inducted into the Chicagoland Sports Hall of Fame. That same year, Duchossois was voted into the National Museum of Racing and Hall of Fame as one of its esteemed Pillars of the Turf.

He received an honorary Doctor of Laws degree from Washington and Lee. In 2015, Washington and Lee University honored him with the Washington Award.

In 2014, he and his wife Judi received the Sword of Loyola award from Loyola University Chicago for their philanthropy.

== See also ==
- Arlington Classic
- Beverly D. Stakes
- Eclipse Special Award
- Pucker Up Stakes
- Sussex Stakes
