= American 1000 Guineas Stakes =

- Class: Non-graded stakes
- Location: Arlington Park; Arlington Heights, Illinois, United States
- Inaugurated: 2008
- Race type: Thoroughbred - Flat racing
- Website: www.arlingtonpark.com

Race information
- Distance: 1 mile (8 furlongs)
- Surface: Turf
- Track: Left-handed
- Qualification: Three-year-olds & up
- Weight: Assigned
- Purse: $200,000

The American 1000 Guineas was an American Thoroughbred horse race held annually at Arlington Park in Arlington Heights, Illinois.

Inaugurated in 2008, the race was open to three-year-old fillies and was contested on turf over a distance of one mile (eight furlongs).

The race was dropped from Arlington Park's stakes schedule for 2011.

== Records ==
Speed record:

- 1:37.59 - Consequence (2009)

Most wins by an owner:

- No owner has won this race more than once.

Most wins by a jockey:

- No jockey has won this race more than once.

Most wins by a trainer:

- No trainer has won this race more than once.

== Winners ==
Year	Winner	Jockey	Trainer	Owner	Time
2010	Bay to Bay	Robby Albarado	Brian A. Lynch	Robert Smithen	1:39.24
2009	Consequence	John Velazquez	Claude R. McGaughey III	Phipps Stable	1:37.59
2008	Much Obliged	Christopher Emigh	Malcolm Pierce	Pin Oak Stable	1:37.96
