= Sixty Sails Handicap =

- Class: Grade III
- Location: Hawthorne Race Course; Stickney/Cicero, Illinois, United States
- Race type: Thoroughbred – Flat racing
- Website: www.hawthorneracecourse.com

Race information
- Distance: 1 1/8 miles (9 furlongs)
- Surface: Dirt
- Track: left-handed
- Qualification: Fillies & Mares, three-years-old & Up
- Weight: Assigned
- Purse: US$150,000 (2014)

The Sixty Sails Handicap is an American Thoroughbred horse race held annually during the third week of April at Hawthorne Race Course in Stickney/Cicero, Illinois. A Grade III event open to Fillies and Mares, age three and older, it is contested on dirt at a distance of one mile and one eighth (9 furlongs).

Inaugurated in 1976 at Sportsman's Park, in 2004, the race was moved to Hawthorne Race Course. It was named for the racing filly Sixty Sails, owned by John Petre and Chris Vodanovich of New Orleans.

Since inception, the Sixty Sails Handicap has been contested at various distances:

- 1976–1981 : 1 mile (8 furlongs)
- 1982–1984 : 1 1/16 miles (8.5 furlongs)
- 1985–present : 1 1/8 miles (9 furlongs)

== Race notes ==
In 1992, Illinois-breds accomplished a historic first when they finished 1-2-3 in the race.

== Records ==
Speed record:

- 1:46.69 – Crafty Oak (1999) (also equalled the track record)

== Winners since 1982 ==
| Year | Winner | Age | Jockey | Trainer | Owner | Time |
|---|---|---|---|---|---|---|
| 2015 | Yahilwa | 5 | Elvis Trujillo | James M. Cassidy | D. P. Racing | 1:51.13 |
| 2014 | Flashy American | 5 | Christopher A. Emigh | Kenneth G. McPeek | Preston Stables | 1:50.36 |
| 2013 | Disposablepleasure | 4 | Javier Castellano | Todd Pletcher | Glencrest Farm | 1:50.19 |
| 2012 | She's All In | 5 | Luis Quinonez | Donnie K. Von Hemel | Robert Zoellner | 1:51.79 |
| 2011 | No Race | — | No Race | No Race | No Race | — |
| 2010 | Life at Ten | 5 | Michael Baze | Todd Pletcher | Nickelback Farm | 1:51.02 |
| 2009 | Swift Temper | 5 | Christopher Emigh | Dale L. Romans | Mark H. Stanley | 1:51.70 |
| 2008 | Golden Velvet | 5 | Eibar Coa | Kiaran McLaughlin | Darley Racing | 1:51.30 |
| 2007 | Kettleoneup | 4 | Calvin Borel | Michael A. Tomlinson | Tom Crouch | 1:50.89 |
| 2006 | Fleet Indian | 5 | José A. Santos | Todd A. Pletcher | Paul H. Saylor | 1:49.37 |
| 2005 | Isola Piu Bella | 5 | John Velazquez | Todd A. Pletcher | Sumaya US Stables | 1:49.58 |
| 2004 | Allspice | 4 | Christopher Emigh | Greg Geier | James B. Tafel | 1:50.66 |
| 2003 | Bare Necessities | 4 | René Douglas | Wallace Dollase | Iron County Farms | 1:52.84 |
| 2002 | With Ability | 4 | Javier Castellano | Mark A. Hennig | Edward P. Evans | 1:51.37 |
| 2001 | License Fee | 6 | Larry Melancon | W. Elliott Walden | WinStar Farm | 1:49.11 |
| 2000 | Lu Ravi | 5 | Pat Day | Carl Bowman | Yoshio Fujita | 1:49.15 |
| 1999 | Crafty Oak | 5 | Ray Sibille | Gene Cilio | Virginia H. Tarra Trust | 1:46.69 |
| 1998 | Glitter Woman | 4 | Gary Stevens | Claude R. McGaughey III | H. Joseph Allen | 1:50.49 |
| 1997 | Top Secret | 4 | Craig Perret | George R. Arnold II | John H. Peace | 1:49.71 |
| 1996 | Alcovy | 6 | Willie Martinez | William G. Huffman | Riley Mangum | 1:50.70 |
| 1995 | Eskimo's Angel | 6 | Mark Guidry | Bobby C. Barnett | John A. Franks | 1:51.53 |
| 1994 | Princess Polonia | 4 | Wigberto Ramos | Harvey L. Vanier | Louis F. Aiken | 1:51.88 |
| 1993 | Pleasant Baby | 4 | Juvenal Diaz | J. Bert Sonnier | Mrs. Corbin J. Robertson | 1:49.30 |
| 1992 | Peach Of It | 6 | E. T. Baird | Eddie Cole | N. Balodimas & M. Donnelly | 1:51.28 |
| 1991 | Balotra | 4 | Randall Meier | Clifford J. Scott | Bluegrass Partnership | 1:50.98 |
| 1990 | Leave It Be | 5 | Herson Sanchez | Mark Dumas | Celestino DiLibero | 1:53.40 |
| 1989 | Valid Vixen | 4 | Juvenal Diaz | Neil B. Boyce | Neil & Michele Boyce | 1:52.60 |
| 1988 | Top Corsage | 5 | Pat Valenzuela | Jerry M. Fanning | Dan J. Agnew | 1:52.00 |
| 1987 | Queen Alexandra | 5 | Don Brumfield | George Baker | Rosalind Rosenthal | 1:49.60 |
| 1986 | Sefa's Beauty | 7 | Randy Romero | William I. Mott | Farid Sefa | 1:50.00 |
| 1985 | Sefa's Beauty | 6 | Pat Day | William I. Mott | Farid Sefa | 1:52.60 |
| 1984 | Queen of Song | 5 | Ron Hirdes | Claude R. McGaughey III | Parrish Hill Farm | 1:46.60 |
| 1983 | Queen of Song | 4 | Ron Hirdes | Claude R. McGaughey III | Parrish Hill Farm | 1:43.80 |
| 1982 | Targa | 5 | R. D. Evans | Jack Van Berg | John Forsythe & Ken Opstein | 1:45.00 |

== Earlier winners ==
In 1980 and 1981 the Sixty Sails Handicap was run in two divisions.

- 1981 – Karla's Enough
- 1981 – Gold Treasure
- 1980 – Doing It My Way
- 1980 – Conga Miss
- 1979 – Strate Sunshine
- 1978 – Drop the Pigeon
- 1977 – Kissapotamus
- 1976 – Enchanted Native
