= Craig F. Cullinan Jr. =

American oilman

Craig Cullinan Jr.
- Born: May 17, 1925; Houston, Texas, U.S.
- Died: March 17, 2004 (aged 78); United States
- Resting place: Glenwood Cemetery; Houston, Texas
- Education: Phillips Exeter Academy
- Alma mater: Yale University
- Occupation: Businessman
- Known for: Houston Astros, Texaco
- Parent: Craig Francis Cullinan Sr. & Edith Phillips
- Relatives: Joseph S. Cullinan (grandfather)

Craig Francis Cullinan Jr. (May 17, 1925 – March 17, 2004) was an American oilman from Texas and baseball executive. He served as Chairman of the Executive Committee of the Houston Sports Association, the founding group of thirty members that acquired the Houston Astros Major League Baseball franchise rights. Originally named the Houston Colt .45's, Cullinan Jr. served as the team's first president.

== Biography ==
Born to Craig F. Cullinan Sr. and Edith Cullinan (née Phillips) on May 17, 1925, in Houston, Texas, his grandfather, Joseph S. Cullinan, founded The Texas Fuel Company in 1902 which would eventually be known as Texaco.

After completing high school at Phillips Exeter Academy in 1942, Craig Cullinan Jr. served as an ensign in the United States Navy Reserve during World War II. When the war ended, he entered Yale University, where he was a member of the Wolf's Head Society, graduating in the Class of 1949.

Cullinan died in 2004, leaving behind one child and three grandchildren.

== Baseball career ==
Cullinan was convinced by George Kirksey to show interest in baseball for Houston. In 1957, Cullinan, Kirskey, and Bill Kirkland formed the Houston Sports Association. For his efforts, he was honored with a lifetime achievement award by the Houston sports writers in 2001.

== Thoroughbred racing ==
Craig Cullinan Jr. owned and raced a number of Thoroughbred racehorses, the most successful of which was King's Bishop.
