= Kaye Bell =

American jockey

Sandra Kaye Bell (born March 4, 1953, in Lexington, Kentucky) was one of the first female jockeys in the history of American thoroughbred racing. She rode her first race at Churchill Downs on November 16, 1971, and raced at major race tracks across the United States.

== First career ==
As a jockey (1971 & 1972) she was the first female to win a race at Keeneland and Oaklawn Park race tracks. During this period she rode under contract to Horatio Luro and Doug Davis and was the first woman to win two Kentucky Derby Day Races (1972) on the same day at Churchill Downs.

As a trainer (1972–1990), Kaye Bell trained at all the major tracks in Kentucky, New York, Florida, Maryland, New Jersey, Illinois, Arkansas, Michigan, Louisiana and California. Her win in the 1975 Michigan Mile and One-Eighth marked the first time a woman trained a $100,000 stakes winner.

As an owner (1985–2006) she bred, raised and raced horses off her (1000 acre – 50 horse) farm in Virginia.

== Second career ==
Currently she operates The Art of Racing; a consulting service that trains thoroughbreds for racing and show purposes. In her work she travels between Lexington, Kentucky and Los Angeles, California acting as liaison between the film industry and racetracks worldwide. Over the years she has expanded her knowledge and studied in depth the world of equine veterinary medicine. She also works with her husband, John DeCuir Jr., in their entertainment consulting firm, Architects of Illusion.
