= Hawthorne Gold Cup Handicap =

- Class: Grade III
- Location: Hawthorne Race Course; Stickney, Illinois, USA
- Inaugurated: 1928
- Race type: Thoroughbred – Flat racing
- Website: www.hawthorneracecourse.com

Race information
- Distance: 1 1/4 miles (10 furlongs)
- Surface: Dirt
- Track: Left-handed
- Qualification: Three-year-olds and up
- Weight: Handicap
- Purse: $250,000

The Hawthorne Gold Cup Handicap is a Grade III race for thoroughbred horses run at Hawthorne Race Course in Stickney, Illinois each year. The Hawthorne Gold Cup trophy has always been made of solid gold.

The Hawthorne Gold Cup is currently a Grade III event for three-year-olds and up, at one and one-quarter miles (ten furlongs) on the dirt, and currently carries a purse of $250,000.

The Hawthorne Gold Cup was not run in 1934 and 1936 as a result of the Great Depression, not during World War II from 1940 through 1945, and not in 1978 when the grandstand was destroyed by fire. While the facilities were being rebuilt, the 1979 race was held at nearby Sportsman's Park. The race was also not run in 2016, due to purse money hardships in Illinois.

Historically, a premier race of the season that attracted the best horses from across the United States, U.S. Hall of Fame horse Sun Beau won it three times in a row between 1929 and 1931. Other Hall of Fame inductees have their name on the Gold Cup, including Equipoise (1933), Discovery (1935), Challedon (1936), Round Table, who won it back-to-back in 1957 and 1958, Kelso (1960) and Dr. Fager in 1967.

In 1959, Day Court, ridden by Henry Moreno, set a new track record in winning the race, a record that stood until Ron Turcotte broke it again in 1970 aboard Gladwin.

In 1979, the race was run at 9 furlongs.

== Records ==
Time record: (at current 1 1/4 miles distance)

- 1:58. 4/5 – Gladwin (1970) and Group Plan (1974)

Largest Winning Margin:

- 10 lengths – Cryptoclearance (1988)

Most wins:

- 3 – Sun Beau (1929, 1930, 1931)

Most wins by an owner:

- 3 – Willis Sharpe Kilmer (1929, 1930, 1931)
- 3 – Walmac Farm (1948, 1949, 1955)

Most wins by a jockey:

- 3 – William Boland (1952, 1956, 1962)

Most wins by a Trainer:

- 3 – Howard Wells (1948, 1949, 1950)
- 3 – Robert J. Frankel (1983, 1984, 1985)
- 3 – Todd Pletcher (2008, 2014, 2015)

== Winners ==
Year	Winner	Age	Jockey	Trainer	Owner	Time
2017	Scuba	6	Alonso Quinonez	Brendan P. Walsh	DARRS, Inc.	2:03.12
2016	Race not held					
2015	Commissioner	4	Florent Geroux	Todd Pletcher	WinStar Farm	2:02.09
2014	Red Rifle	4	Florent Geroux	Todd Pletcher	Twin Creeks Racing Stables	2:03.24
2013	Last Gunfighter	4	Joe Bravo	Chad C. Brown	John D. Gunther	2:06.11
2012	Pool Play	7	Miguel Mena	Mark E. Casse	William S. Farish IV	2:06.36
2011	Headache	5	Paco Lopez	Michael Maker	Kenneth & Sarah Ramsey	2:04.68
2010	Redding Colliery	4	Rosie Napravnik	Kiaran McLaughlin	Mrs. Fitriani Hay	2:04.16
2009	Awesome Gem	6	David Flores	Craig Dollase	West Point Thoroughbreds	2:04.36
2008	Fairbanks	5	Richard Migliore	Todd Pletcher	Team Valor	2:04.57
2007	Student Council	5	Richard Migliore	Steve Asmussen	Millennium Farms	2:05.00
2006	It's No Joke	4	Eddie Razo Jr.	Rebecca Maker	Stan Fulton	2:03.89
2005	Super Frolic	5	Victor Espinoza	Vladimir Cerin	Millennium Farms	2:04.66
2004	Freefourinternet	6	Greta Kuntzweiler	Michael J. Maker	Equirace.com	2:03.34
2003	Perfect Drift	4	Pat Day	Murray Johnson	Stonecrest Farm	2:03.63
2002	Hail The Chief	5	Jorge Chavez	Niall O'Callaghan	Peter M. Crane	2:02.80
2001	Duckhorn	4	Randall Meier	Patrick B. Byrne	Michael Tabor	2:01.61
2000	Dust On The Bottle	5	Tim Doocy	Glenn Hild	Sharon Hild	2:03.09
1999	Supreme Sound	5	Randall Meier	Michael W. Dickinson	Peter Harris	2:01.19
1998	Awesome Again	4	Pat Day	Patrick B. Byrne	Stronach Stables	2:02.71
1997	Buck's Boy	4	Mark Guidry	Hilary Pridham	Quarter B Farm	2:00.54
1996	Come On Flip	5	Christopher Emigh	Lou Goldfine	R. Ackerman & S. Sommer	2:03.40
1995	Yourmissinthepoint	4	Mark Guidry	Steve Klesaris	Mark Parezo	2:01.00
1994	Recoup The Cash	4	Juvenal L. Diaz	Jere R. Smith Sr.	Richard Trebat	2:01.99
1993	Evanescent	6	Aaron Gryder	Lou Goldfine	Mark Levy	2:02.19
1992	Irish Swap	5	Bruce Poyadou	Joseph E. Broussard	Randy Hendricks	2:01.12
1991	Sunny Sunrise	4	Chris Antley	Bud Delp	Harry & Mary Jo Meyerhoff	2:04.10
1990	Black Tie Affair	4	Juvenal L. Diaz	Ernie T. Poulos	Jeff Sullivan	2:03.40
1989	Cryptoclearance	5	José A. Santos	Scotty Schulhofer	Philip Teinowitz	2:00.40
1988	Cryptoclearance	4	José A. Santos	Scotty Schulhofer	Philip Teinowitz	2:00.20
1987	Nostalgia's Star	5	Fernando Toro	Jay M. Robbins	Hinds, Robbins & Duckett	2:02.00
1986	Ends Well	5	Randy Romero	Robert Reinacher Jr.	Greentree Stable	2:00.60
1985	Garthorn	5	Rafael Meza	Robert J. Frankel	Ann & Jerry Moss	2:01.80
1984	Proof	4	Ed Delahoussaye	Robert J. Frankel	Bertram R. Firestone/Jerry Moss	2:01.20
1983	Water Bank	4	Chris Lamance	Robert J. Frankel	Elmendorf Farm	2:01.40
1982	Recusant	4	Ronald Hirdes Jr.	Mike Ball	Donamire Farms	2:01.80
1981	Spruce Bouquet	4	Kerwin Clark	Roy C. Wood Jr.	Dan O. Wolfe	2:04.20
1980	Tunerup	4	Jorge Vasquez	Floreano Fernandez	Daybreak Farm	2:00.60
1979	Young Bob	4	Ron Turcotte	Gerard McGrath	J. A. Logan	1:51.00
1977	On The Sly	4	Gregg McCarron	Mel Gross	Balmak Stable	2:01.60
1976	Almost Grown	4	Michael Morgan	Jack Van Berg	Flash III Stable	2:01.60
1975	Royal Glint	5	Jorge Tejeira	Gordon R. Potter	Dan Lasater	2:02.20
1974	Group Plan	4	Jorge Velásquez	H. Allen Jerkens	Hobeau Farm	1:58.80
1973	Tri Jet	4	Braulio Baeza	Thomas W. Kelley	Fred W. Hooper	2:01.40
1972	Droll Role	4	Eddie Maple	Thomas J. Kelly	John M. Schiff	2:00.40
1971	Twice Worthy	4	Laffit Pincay Jr.	James P. Conway	Saddle Rock Farm	1:59.40
1970	Gladwin	4	Ron Turcotte	Evan Jackson	H. Harcourt	1:58.80
1969	Nodouble	4	Eddie Belmonte	J. Bert Sonnier	Verna Lea Farm	1:59.80
1968	Nodouble	3	Martinez Heath	J. Bert Sonnier	Verna Lea Farm	1:59.20
1967	Dr. Fager	3	Braulio Baeza	John A. Nerud	Tartan Stable	2:01.20
1966	Bold Bidder	4	Pete D. Anderson	Woody Stephens	John R. Gaines	2:02.60
1965	Moss Vale	4	Ronnie Baldwin	Sam J. Molay	Gentilly Stable	2:07.80
1964	Going Abroad	4	Ray Broussard	Joseph H. Pierce Jr.	Edward & Harry Seltzer	2:01.60
1963	Admiral Vic	3	Mickey Solomone	Peter J. Dispenza	Sunny Blue Farm	2:03.60
1962	Beau Purple	5	William Boland	H. Allen Jerkens	Hobeau Farm	2:04.20
1961	T. V. Lark	4	Johnny Longden	Paul K. Parker	Preston W. Madden	2:02.60
1960	Kelso	3	Eddie Arcaro	Carl Hanford	Bohemia Stable	2:02.00
1959	Day Court	4	Henry Moreno	Walter A. Kelley	Elmendorf Farm	1:59.20
1958	Round Table	4	Bill Shoemaker	William Molter	Kerr Stable	1:59.80
1957	Round Table	3	Willie Harmatz	William Molter	Kerr Stable	2:00.20
1956	Dedicate	4	William Boland	G. Carey Winfrey	Jan Burke	2:02.40
1955	Hasseyampa	4	Billie Fisk	John J. Greely Jr.	Walmac Farm	2:04.80
1954	Rejected	4	Eric Guerin	William J. Hirsch	King Ranch	2:11.60
1953	Sub Fleet	4	Steve Brooks	Jack C. Hodgins	Dixiana Farm	2:00.60
1952	To Market	4	William Boland	William J. Hirsch	King Ranch	2:01.40
1951	Seaward	6	Avelino Gomez	Harry Trotsek	Hasty House Farm	2:04.20
1950	Dr. Ole Nelson	4	Gerald Porch	Howard Wells	M. A. & R. Saffir	2:01.40
1949	Volcanic	4	Angel Rivera	Howard Wells	Walmac Farm	2:02.80
1948	Billings	3	Melvin Peterson	Howard Wells	Walmac Farm	2:06.00
1947	Be Faithful	5	Willie Garner	H. H. Pete Battle	Mrs. E. E. Dale Shaffer	2:03.20
1946	Jack's Jill	4	Jesse Higley	John Milton Goode	Joseph A. Goodwin	2:03.00
1939	Challedon	3	Harry Richards	Louis Schaefer	William L. Brann	2:03.20
1938	Esposa	6	Nick Wall	Matthew P. Brady	Middleburg Stable	2:13.80
1937	Sahri II	6	Fred A. Smith	Jose Cuevas	Lawrence Barker	2:04.20
1935	Discovery	4	John Bejshak	Bud Stotler	Alfred G. Vanderbilt II	2:04.40
1933	Equipose	5	Raymond Workman	Thomas J. Healey	C. V. Whitney	2:02.80
1932	Plucky Play	5	George Woolf	Woody Fitzgerald	Northway Stable	2:04.20
1931	Sun Beau	6	Charles Kurtsinger	Jack Whyte	Willis Sharpe Kilmer	NF
1930	Sun Beau	5	Frank Coltiletti	William A. Crawford	Willis Sharpe Kilmer	NF
1929	Sun Beau	4	Frank Coltiletti	Andy Schuttinger	Willis Sharpe Kilmer	2:01.60
1928	Display	5	John Maiben	Thomas J. Healey	Walter J. Salmon Sr.	2:03.00
