= Hanshin Stakes =

- Class: Grade III
- Location: Churchill Downs; Louisville, Kentucky, United States
- Inaugurated: 1941 (as Equipose Mile at Arlington Park)
- Race type: Thoroughbred – Flat racing
- Sponsor: JRA
- Website: www.arlingtonpark.com

Race information
- Distance: 1 mile (8 furlongs)
- Surface: Dirt
- Track: Left-handed
- Qualification: Four-year-olds & Up
- Weight: Allwance
- Purse: $300,000 (2025)

The Hanshin Stakes is a Grade III American Thoroughbred horse race held annually in July at Churchill Downs. The event open to horses three years of age and older, it is contested on dirt over a distance of 8 furlongs and currently offers a purse of $100,000. The event is sponsored by the Japanese Racing Association. The event has a sister race, the Churchill Downs Cup, held at Hanshin Racecourse in Japan.

Due to the unpredictability of the race, it has been said many times on Hanshin Cup Day, “Anything can happen in the Hanshin”.

== History ==
The race was inaugurated in 1941 at Arlington Park as the Equipoise Mile in honor of the great colt Equipoise. It was raced under that name from 1941 through 1963 and in 1966 and 1967. In 1964 and 1965 it was raced as the Equipoise Handicap then from 1968 through 1997.

The race was hosted by the Washington Park Race Track from 1943 through 1945. It was run in two divisions in 1945.

U.S. Racing Hall of Fame inductee Swoon's Son won back-to-back runnings of this race in 1957–58. In 1967, the race saw the last racecourse appearance of the 1965 United States Horse of the Year Moccasin.

The race was not run from 1970 through 1978 and again in 1988. It was on hiatus again in 1998 and 1999 but returned as the Hanshin Cup Handicap in 2000. The race was renamed due to a partnership between Arlington Park and its sister racetrack, Hanshin Racecourse in Japan. The two racetracks would host an event named after the other, with Hanshin Racecourse hosting the Arlington Cup. The race was not held in 2020 due to the COVID-19 pandemic.

In 2021 Arlington Park owner Churchill Downs Incorporated (CDI), announced the closure of racetrack. The following year the Hanshin Cup Handicap was moved to Churchill Downs and renamed the Hanshin Stakes.

In 2026 the Thoroughbred Owners and Breeders Association announced that the event would be upgraded to Grade III status.

== Past winners ==
- 2026 - Nu What's New (Luis Saez)
- 2025 – Will Take It (Brian Hernandez Jr.)
- 2024 – Cagliostro (Flavien Prat)
- 2023 – Zozos (Florent Geroux)
- 2022 – Cody's Wish (Junior Alvarado)
- 2021 – Guest Suite (Emmanuel Esquivel)
- 2020 – Not Held
- 2019 – Lanier (Declan Cannon)
- 2018 – Matrooh (Santo Sanjur)
- 2017 – Crewman (Carlos Marquez, Jr.)
- 2016 – Trace Creek (Julio E. Felix)
- 2015 – Midnight Cello (Florent Geroux)
- 2014 – Nikki's Sandcastle (Leandro R. Goncalves)
- 2013 – Hogy (Christopher A. Emigh)
- 2012 – Havelock (Florent Geroux)
- 2011 – Workin for Hops (James Graham)
- 2010 – Country Flavor (Inez Karlsson)
- 2009 – Vacation (John Velazquez)
- 2008 – Coragil Cat (Diego Sanchez)
- 2007 – Spotsgone (Earlie Fires)
- 2006 – Gouldings Green (Corey Lanerie)
- 2005 – Lord of the Game (Eusebio Razo, Jr.)
- 2004 – Crafty Shaw (Craig Perret)
- 2003 – Apt to Be (Eusebio Razo, Jr.)
- 2002 – Bonapaw (Gerard Melancon)
- 2001 – Bright Valour (Robby Albarado)
- 2000 – Bright Valour (Jesse Campbell)
- 1999 – No Race
- 1998 – No race
- 1997 – Announce
- 1996 – Golden Gear
- 1995 – Tarzan's Blase
- 1994 – Slerp
- 1993 – Split Run
- 1992 – Katahaula County
- 1967 – Renewed Vigor (Martinez Heath)
- 1948 – Fervent
