= Harvey L. Vanier =

American horse trainer (1924–2013)

Harvey Vanier
Personal information
- Born: April 21, 1924 Diller, Nebraska, United States
- Died: December 1, 2013 (aged 89) Versailles, Kentucky
- Occupations: Jockey, Trainer, Owner & Breeder

Horse racing career
- Sport: Horse racing

Major racing wins
- Derby Trial Stakes (1970, 1977); Rebel Stakes (1970); Fayette Stakes (1979); La Cañada Stakes (1982); American Derby (1983, 1987); Arlington Classic (1983); Blue Grass Stakes (1983, 1989); Travers Stakes (1983); Donn Handicap (1984); Shadwell Turf Mile Stakes (1987); Red Bank Stakes (1988); Cornhusker Handicap (1989, 1995); Lane's End Stakes (1989); Pennsylvania Derby (1989); Robert F. Carey Memorial Handicap (1989, 1995, 1996); Illinois Oaks (1990); Turfway Park Fall Championship Stakes (1993); Washington Park Handicap (1993); Sixty Sails Handicap (1994); Alcibiades Stakes (1996); Arlington-Washington Lassie Stakes (1996); Isaac Murphy Handicap (1997)

Significant horses
- Play Fellow, Western Playboy

Harvey L. Vanier (April 21, 1924 - December 1, 2013) was an American trainer, owner and breeder of Thoroughbred racehorses. With his wife Nancy Aiken-Vanier, they owned and bred racehorses on their Fairberry Farm in Waterloo, Illinois.

Vanier began his career in Thoroughbred racing as a jockey, first riding as a boy of 12 at state and county fairs. Once old enough to obtain a professional license, he rode at Nebraska tracks. Weight gain ended his riding career in his late teens and in 1942 he turned to training. However, that was short-lived when he joined the United States Army and served in Europe during World War II.
