= Arlington Park =

Horse race track in Illinois, United States (1927–2021)

Coordinates: 42°5′27.33″N 88°0′36.8″W

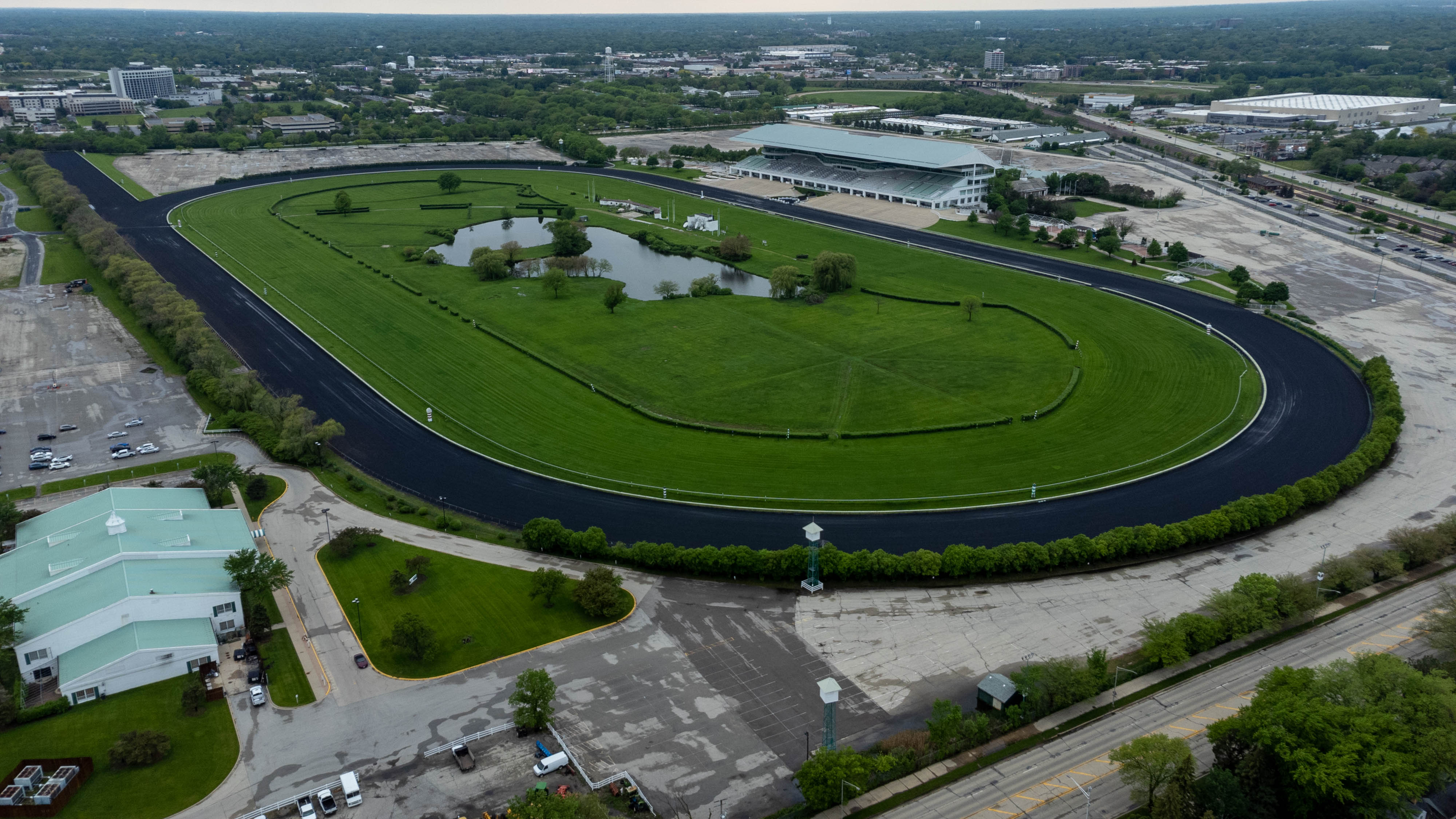
- Arlington Park in May 2022
- Interactive map of Arlington Park
- Location: Arlington Heights, Illinois, United States
- Owned by: Independent (1927–68, 1983–2000); Gulf & Western(1968–83); Churchill Downs Inc. (2000–23); Chicago Bears (since 2023)
- Date opened: October 13, 1927; 98 years ago
- Date closed: September 25, 2021; 4 years ago
- Capacity: 35,000 seats 12,000 clubhouse seats
- Race type: Flat; Thoroughbred
- Course type: Polytrack; Turf
- Notable races: Arlington Million Stakes (G1); Beverly D. Stakes (G1); Secretariat Stakes (G1); American Derby

Arlington Park (formerly known as Arlington International Racecourse) was a Thoroughbred race track in the Chicago suburb of Arlington Heights, Illinois, United States. Once called the Arlington Park Jockey Club, it was located adjacent to the Illinois Route 53 expressway and serviced by the Chicago and North Western Railway.

On February 15, 2023, the Chicago Bears of the National Football League (NFL) completed their purchase of the Arlington Park property. The team may build a stadium on the site for its home games.

In August 2025, the racetrack was fully demolished, and the Chicago Bears confirmed their plan for a new stadium at the site.

However, in June 2026, the Chicago Bears Board of Directors voted to move forward with a plan to build a stadium in Hammond, Indiana after the failure of the so-called "megaprojects" bill in the Illinois Senate. As a result, the future of the Arlington Park site remains uncertain.

== Overview ==
Arlington International was the site of the first thoroughbred race with a million-dollar purse, in 1981. The premier event at Arlington Park was the International Festival of Racing, held in early August, which featured three Grade 1 races on turf: the Arlington Million Stakes, Beverly D. Stakes and Secretariat Stakes.

Owner Churchill Downs Inc. announced plans in February 2021 to sell all 326 acres of the Arlington Park property for redevelopment. On September 29, 2021, the Chicago Bears announced that they reached an agreement to purchase the property; the sale was finalized in February 2023.

== History ==
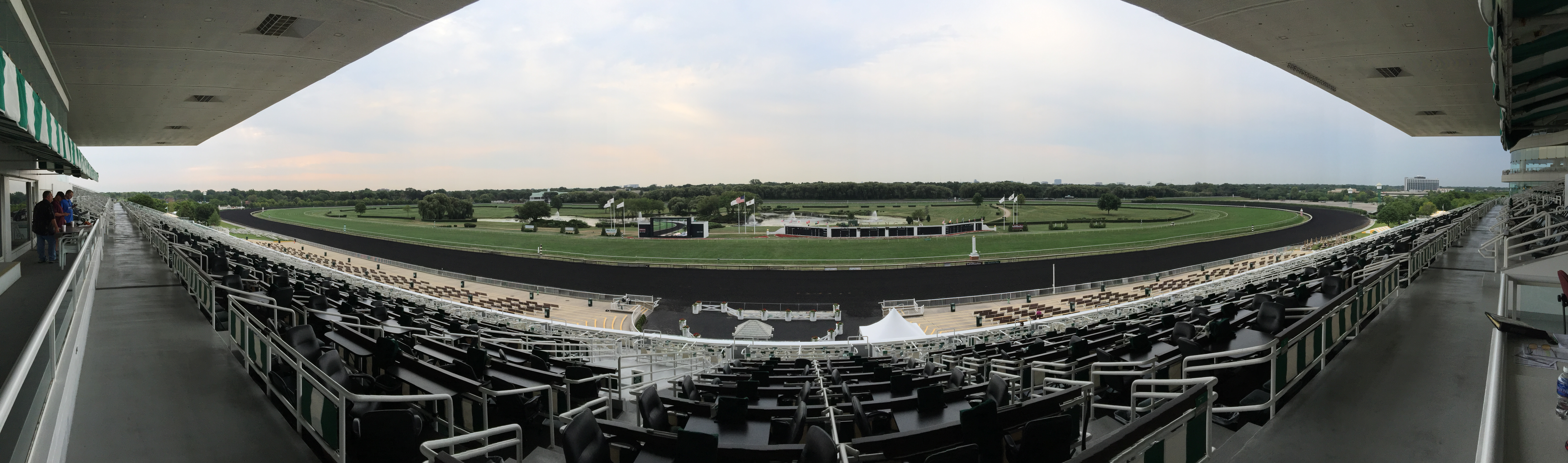
The grandstand at Arlington International Racecourse, Arlington Heights, Illinois

Arlington International Racecourse was founded as Arlington Park by California businessman Harry D. "Curly" Brown, who would later serve as president of Oriental Park Racetrack in Havana, Cuba. The track officially opened in 1927 to 20,000 spectators. Jockey Joe Bollero, who later became a successful trainer, rode Luxembourg to victory in the first race ever run at Arlington.

Benjamin F. Lindheimer acquired Arlington Park in 1940 and owned it until his death in 1960. Long involved with the business, adopted daughter Marje Lindheimer Everett then took over management of the racetrack.

Widely respected Hall of Fame trainer Jimmy Jones of Calumet Farm was quoted by Sports Illustrated as saying that Lindheimer "was the savior of Chicago racing" and that "Arlington Park became the finest track in the world—certainly the finest I've ever been on."

On July 5, 1948, Citation won the Stars and Stripes Stakes in his first appearance since winning the Triple Crown, equaling the 1 1/8-mile record of the time by winning in 1:49 1/5. On June 24, 1952, jockey Eddie Arcaro became the first American jockey to win 3,000 races.

Five years after the seating capacity increased to 30,000 and parking facilities expanded to accommodate 15,000, a new paddock was unveiled in 1960. In 1964, Arlington Park inherited the thoroughbred race dates of Washington Park, which began exclusively running harness races.

In 1966, future Hall of Fame jockey Laffit Pincay Jr. got his first American victory. Two years later, the future Hall of Famer Dr. Fager won the one-mile Washington Park Handicap in world-record time of 1:32 1/5; he carried 134 pounds and held that record until 1998.

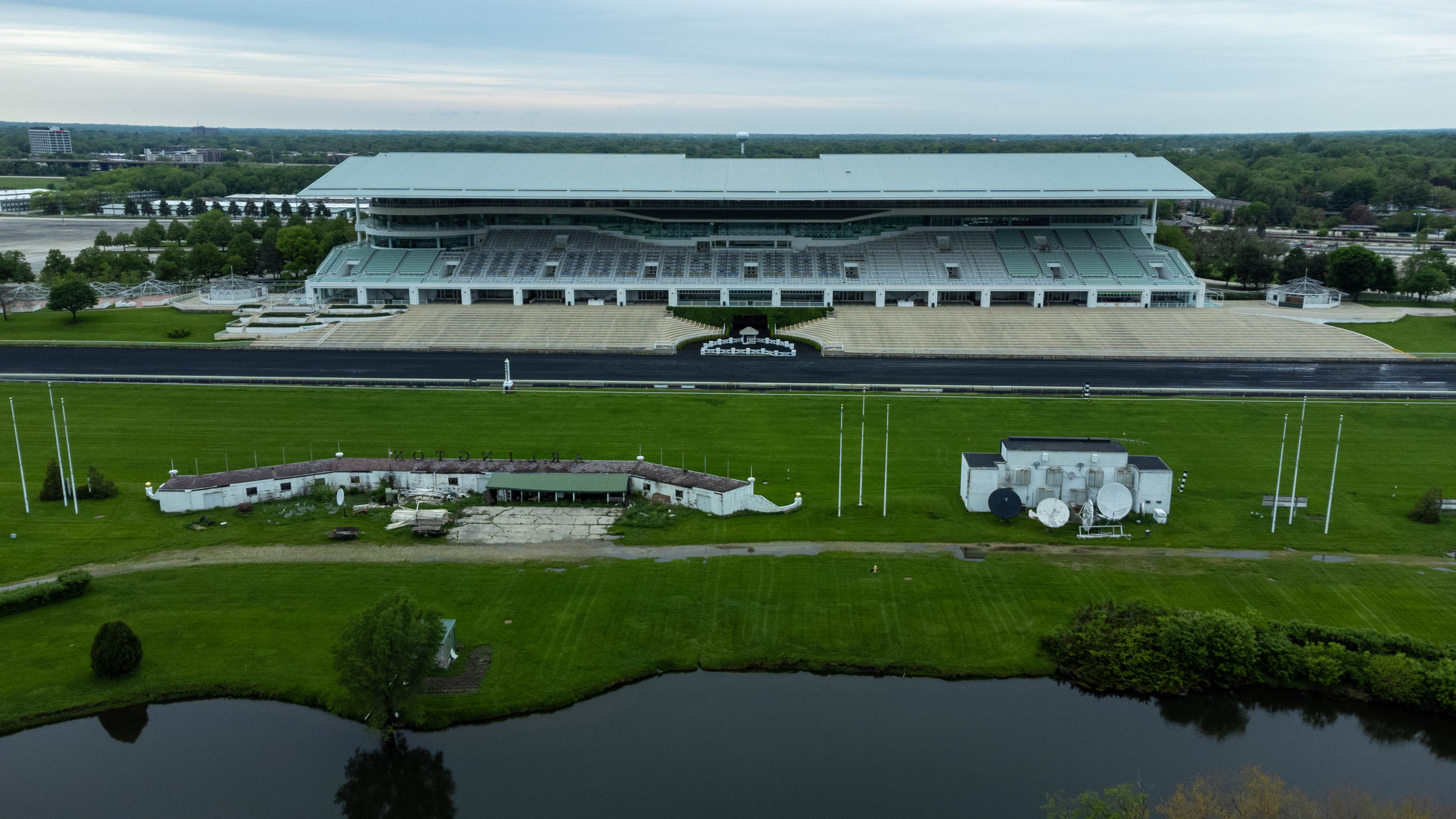
The Grandstand in 2022

In 1968, Marje Everett sold the racetrack to Gulf & Western, remaining as director. The following year, she was accused of bribing Illinois Governor Otto Kerner Jr. The alleged bribes were in the form of stock options in 1961 that Kerner bought at a reduced price and then sold in 1968 at a profit. Kerner was eventually convicted of mail fraud, but Everett denied at trial that she intended to bribe him, and the government never identified her as a briber.

In June 1973, Arlington organized a race for three-year-olds, the Arlington Invitational, to lure Secretariat to the Midwest. Secretariat won easily and Arlington created the Secretariat Stakes, also for three-year-olds but on the turf, in his honor.

In 1981, under the direction of track president Joseph Joyce Jr., Arlington was the home of the world's first million-dollar thoroughbred race: The Arlington Million. The result of that race was noted in bronze at the top of the paddock at Arlington, where a statue of jockey Bill Shoemaker riding John Henry to a come-from-behind victory over 40–1 longshot The Bart celebrated the event.

Arlington entered a new era in 1983 when Richard L. Duchossois led an Illinois investment group consisting of himself, Joyce, Sheldon Robbins, and Ralph Ross, to purchase the track from its former owners and made a pledge to continue presenting championship racing; that was tested on July 31, 1985, when a small fire spread quickly out of control and completely destroyed the grandstand and clubhouse. Unsure of the future of Arlington, the meeting was moved to Hawthorne Race Course, yet it was announced that the Arlington Million would still be held at Arlington International.

On August 25, 1985, this was done by bulldozing and paving over the remains of the grandstand, and setting up temporary bleachers. Arlington Park won a Special Eclipse Award for making the "Miracle Million" happen.

In 1989, three years after Joyce resigned over disagreements with Duchossois, the track was fully re-opened with a new name, Arlington International Racecourse.

In 1996, 34,000 fans jammed into Arlington to see the two-time Horse of the Year and future Hall of Famer Cigar tie the then modern-day record of 16 consecutive wins in the Arlington Citation Challenge (the record Cigar tied had been set by Citation).

In September 2000, reopening after a two-year shutdown caused by contractual disputes preventing racing, Arlington was purchased by Churchill Downs Inc. Reverting to its old name of Arlington Park, it hosted the 2002 Breeders' Cup World Thoroughbred Championships.

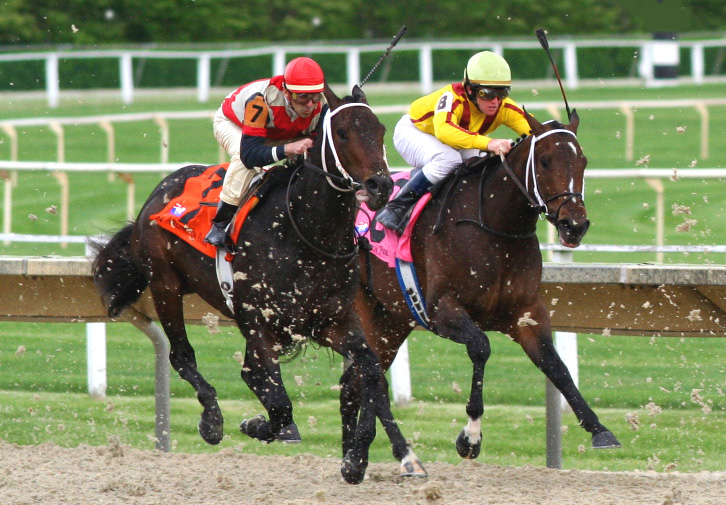
Racing on the polytrack at Arlington International Racecourse, on Memorial Day Weekend of 2007

.

In 2007 to promote safer racing, Arlington Park invested $11 million to install a synthetic racing surface called Polytrack, which remained in use until the track's closure. Do the Wave won the first race on the Polytrack on May 4. On May 11, Arlington debuted an alternate finish line at the 1/16 pole.

The track once again became Arlington International Racecourse in 2013. In 2016, Arlington debuted the Arlington Racing Club, an ownership group with the goal of garnering interest in thoroughbred ownership.

=== Reality television ===
On May 14, 2010, Lee DeWyze, a resident of Mount Prospect, Illinois, and a contestant on American Idol, performed a concert at Arlington Park for approximately 41,000 fans. Also that day, the track was featured in an episode of Undercover Boss where Churchill Downs Inc. CEO Bill Carstanjen went to Arlington and Calder Race Course.

A year later, on May 14, 2011, Haley Reinhart, of Wheeling, Illinois, also made the top 3 on American Idol. She, like DeWyze, had a hometown concert at Arlington Park for nearly 30,000 of her own fans and supporters.

=== Pioneers in racing ===
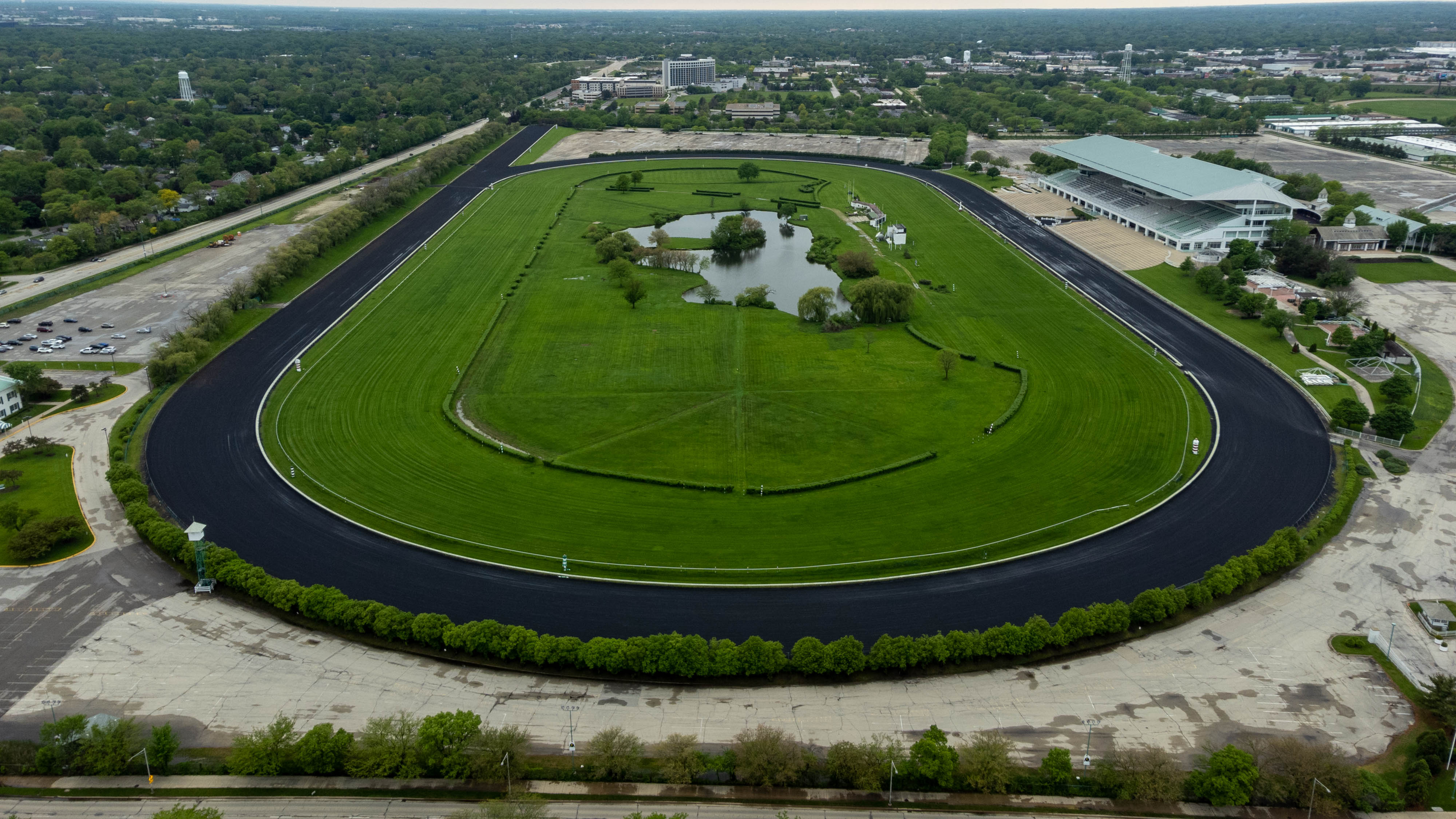
Arlington Park looking west in 2022

In addition to hosting the first-ever million-dollar horse race, Arlington was the first track to install a public-address system and employed the pioneering race caller Clem McCarthy to describe the action. It added the first electric totalizator which allowed for a credible tote board and decreased time between races, in 1933. In 1936 it added a photo finish camera. It introduced the first electric starting gate in 1940 and the largest closed-circuit TV system in all of sports in 1967. In 1971, Arlington held the industry's first commercially sponsored race—the $100,000 Pontiac Grand Prix. On July 4, 1976, Arlington hosted the first Sunday horse races in Illinois.

=== Racetrack closure ===
In August 2019, track owner Churchill Downs Inc. (CDI) announced that it would consider options to transfer racing away from Arlington after 2021. The announcement stemmed from the enactment of the Illinois Gaming Act, which provided for the legalization of sports betting and the construction of new casinos in Illinois. The law gave CDI the right to install up to 1,200 gaming positions, such as slot machines, at Arlington. However, CDI – which had acquired a majority stake of Rivers Casino in nearby Des Plaines earlier that year and had already announced plans to expand it – argued that the installation of gaming positions at Arlington would result in higher tax payments of up to 20% compared to nearby casinos because of contributions needed to fund horse racing purses.

In February 2021, CDI announced plans to sell the entire Arlington property for redevelopment. CDI said it would also seek the transfer of Arlington's racing license to another track in the state, but committed to Arlington's race dates for 2021 (April 30 – September 25). In response, the Illinois Thoroughbred Horsemen's Association (which represents thoroughbred owners and trainers at both Arlington and Hawthorne) denounced CDI's decision, alleging that CDI "all but abandoned any meaningful commitment to Illinois racing" after their majority acquisition of Rivers Casino.

=== Chicago Bears ownership ===
In June 2021, the Chicago Bears announced they had submitted a bid to purchase the land for a potential new stadium to replace their longtime home of Soldier Field (where they have played since 1971). Later that month, the Village of Arlington Heights formally approved an overlay zoning district for a large-scale football stadium at the site.

The last race was held on September 25, 2021, with a 9-race event. The winner of the final race held at Arlington (which was named "The Luxembourg" after the winner of the first race at the track), was Sister Ruler. The final day was capped off with a showing of a documentary on the 1985 fire at the track and a fireworks show.

On September 29, 2021, the Bears announced they would purchase the property for $197.2 million. If a stadium is approved and built, it would be the second horse racing course to be replaced with an NFL venue in recent years, as Inglewood, California's Hollywood Park (once owned by CDI) was replaced by SoFi Stadium, the home of the Los Angeles Chargers and Los Angeles Rams.

On October 27, 2021, the Chicago Bears confirmed that they were not pursuing horse racing but had no further details on their plans for the property. On March 16, 2022, the Bears announced that they had selected MANICA Architecture to help plan the new NFL stadium.

The Bears completed the purchase in February 2023. On May 30, 2023, it started demolition of the interior of the main grandstand, offices, and jockey facilities in preparation for their new stadium. Demolition of the grandstand was completed on September 26, 2023.

On March 11, 2024, Chicago Bears President and CEO Kevin Warren announced that the team had decided to commit $2 billion to build a new stadium in Chicago, leaving the future of the Arlington property uncertain. The Bears had run into issues concerning the value of the Arlington land, which had been contested by the local school districts in Arlington Heights. Despite this, the village of Arlington Heights offered a tax reduction in attempt to lure the team to build new stadium in village. In November, the team and the city reached a tentative agreement over the tax dispute.

In March 2025 the Bears submitted traffic and financial studies for Arlington Heights stadium site. In September 2025, the Bears confirmed that their new stadium is planned for Arlington Heights.

== Physical attributes ==
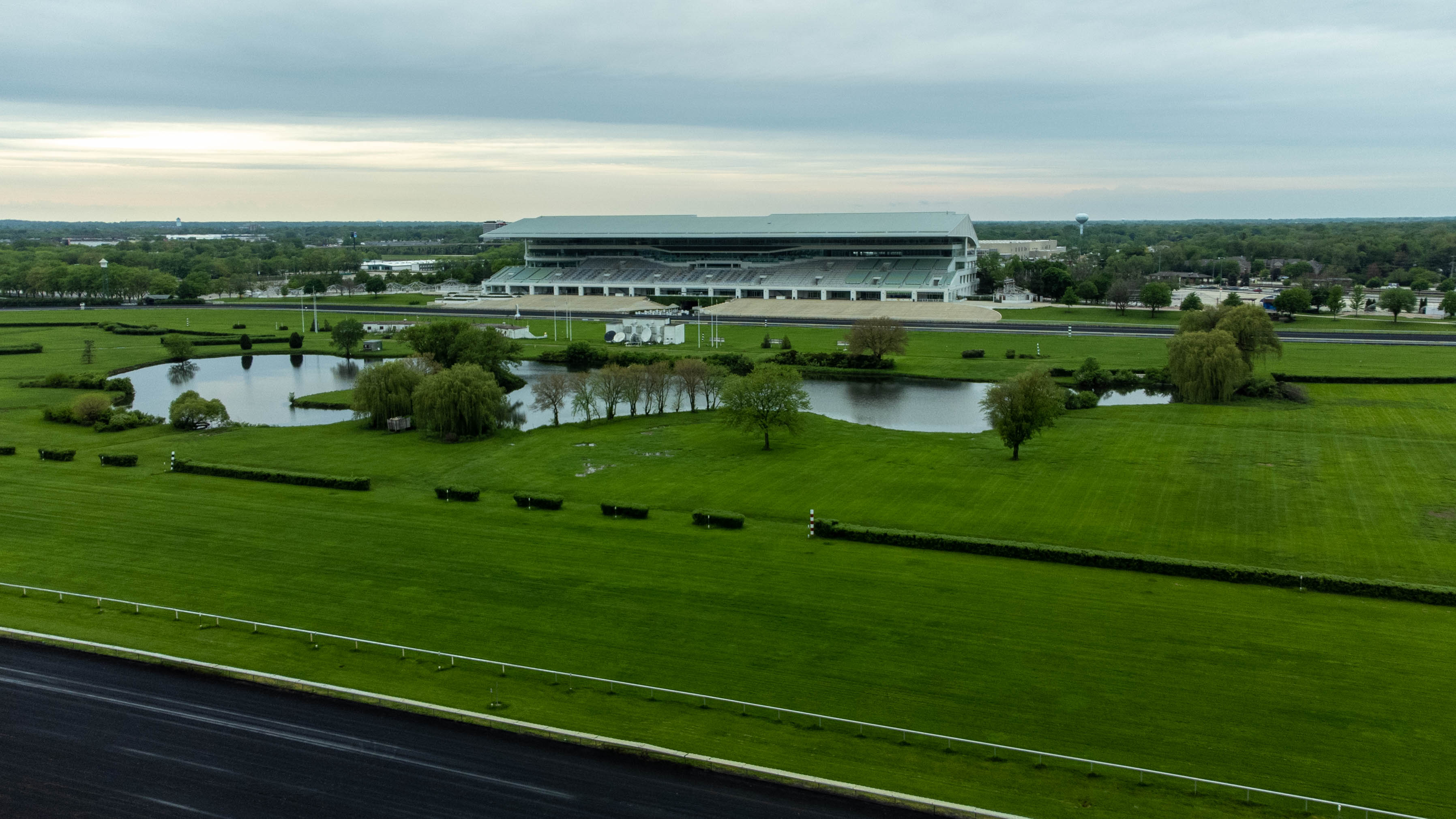
The grandstand and track viewable from the south

The track had a one-mile and one-eighth dirt oval (prior to its replacement with the synthetic Polytrack in 2007) and a one-mile turf oval. There was stabling on the backstretch for over 2,000 horses.

== Racing ==
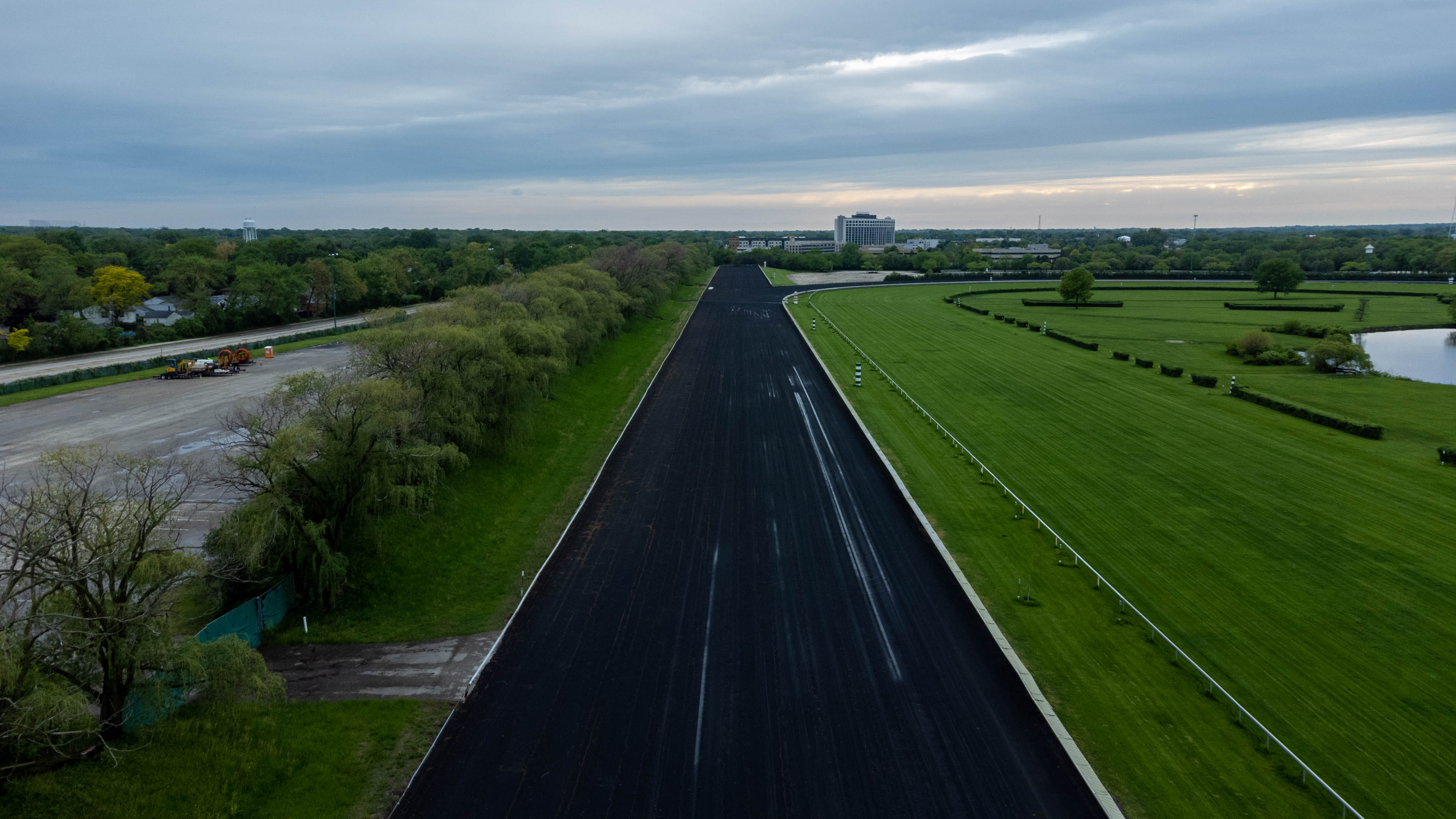
The portion of the track facing west in 2022

Arlington's live racing season formerly ran from the first Friday in May to the second to last Saturday in September. From 2001 until its final season in 2021, races at Arlington were announced by John G. Dooley.

The following stakes were held at Arlington in 2019.

Grade I

- Arlington Million
- Beverly D. Stakes
- Secretariat Stakes

Grade III

- American Derby
- American St. Leger Stakes
- Arlington Handicap
- Arlington Classic Stakes
- Arlington Matron Stakes
- Chicago Handicap
- Hanshin Cup Stakes
- Modesty Handicap
- Pucker Up Stakes

Listed

- Addison Cammack Memorial
- Arlington-Washington Futurity Stakes
- Arlington-Washington Lassie Stakes
- Hatoof Stakes
- Isaac Murphy Handicap

Former Races

- American 1000 Guineas Stakes
- Arlington Oaks
- Arlington Sprint Handicap
- Lincoln Heritage Handicap
- Round Table Stakes
- Sea o'Erin Stakes
- Stars and Stripes Turf Handicap
- Washington Park Handicap
