= Hawthorne Race Course =

Horse racetrack in Illinois, U.S.

Coordinates: 41.827°N 87.744°W

- Interactive map of Hawthorne Race Course
- Location: Stickney, Illinois; United States
- Owned by: Carey Family
- Date opened: May 20, 1891
- Date closed: July 19, 2026 (last racing day)
- Race type: Thoroughbred Horse Racing Spring & Fall
- Notable races: Hawthorne Gold Cup (G II); Illinois Derby (G III); Hawthorne Derby (G III)

Hawthorne Race Course was an American Thoroughbred horse racetrack located in Stickney, Illinois, nearly located close by Cicero, Illinois, near Chicago.

Hawthorne ran its final live race on July 19, 2026, after entering bankruptcy earlier in the year. The property was sold in a stalking horse bid, and the property was vacated by the end of August 2026.

== History and information ==
In 1890, Edward Corrigan, a Chicago businessman and horseman who owned the 1890 Kentucky Derby winner, Riley (by Longfellow), bought 119 acres (0.48 km^{2}) of land in Cicero and started constructing a grandstand for a new racecourse. His track opened in 1891 with a five-race card including the featured Chicago Derby.

In 1902, the grandstand burned to the ground, which moved all racing to the Harlem racetrack in Chicago. The reopened track held a 12-day summer meet at its own facility later that year.

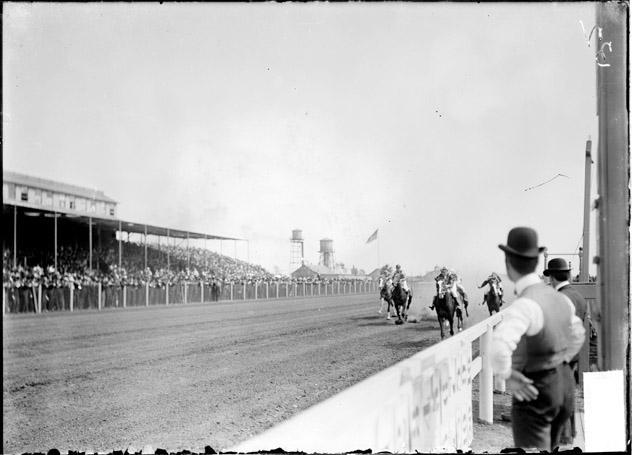
Racehorses running past grandstand filled with spectators in 1903.

In 1905, horse racing was banned in Chicago, leading to the closure of Hawthorne. The field was used briefly by pioneer aviators Victor and Allan Haines Loughead in 1910 to fly a powered Montgomery glider and a Curtiss pusher.

In 1909, the track was sold to Thomas Carey who tried to reopen the track twice but was stopped by the sheriff's department and the local police.

In 1914, motorcycle racing was featured at the track. On June 7, 1914, Charles "Fearless" Balke, famed Motordrome board track and flat track racer, died after colliding with a roller that was mistakenly ordered onto the track by the track manager while Balke was doing practice laps. Balke was blinded by dust and exhaust smoke from other racers who were also doing practice laps. At the time of his death Balke was the top rated motorcycle racer in the United States, and was the number one rider on the top rated Hendee Manufacturing Company / Indian Motorcycle racing team.

In 1916, the track ran a 13-day meeting which included the American Derby. That would be the last race until 1922.

In 1922, the track reopened legally for a 13-day race meeting.

In 1923, the meet expanded again to 25 days. The Chicago Business Men's Racing Association took over racing operations in 1924 and ran a 52-day meet in the fall. This same year a new clubhouse was constructed at Hawthorne, and a form of parimutuel betting was introduced.

By 1927, the racetrack was gaining prominence on the national scene. A new starting was introduced, as was the Hawthorne Gold Cup Handicap, a major stakes event. In 1929, Sun Beau won his first Gold Cup and would later capture two more. In 1931, an electric time and an infield tote board were introduced.

The track introduced daily double wagering to Chicago and used a new infrared timer in the early 1930s. The track began the Chicago racing season in 1936 with a spring meet.

The Hawthorne continued to advance in the 1930s and 1940s, taking over the racing dates of Lincoln Fields Race Track as well as racing earlier in the spring. The track also introduced races restricted to Illinois-bred horses.

Turf racing returned to Hawthorne in 1948 with the renovation of the racing strip and the introduction of a six-furlong turf course. In 1959, a new clubhouse was opened with vastly expanded seating to serve the racing needs of the Chicago market. The track continued to thrive during the 1960s and 1970s, but it had crested in attendance and the attendance slowly began to drop.

By 1970, standardbred harness racing was held at Hawthorne. The track was awarded spring dates and ran spring, summer, and autumn thoroughbred meets and a winter standardbred meet. The track stopped in September for the Arlington Park meet and also began to hold occasional quarter horse races.

In 1978, a fire destroyed Hawthorne's grandstand. The attempt to move the meet to Sportsman's Park Racetrack failed, but in 1979 racing was moved to Sportsman's Park. In 1980 the track officially opened for a 72-day thoroughbred meet beginning at the end of September.

In 1985, Arlington Park burned to the ground and Hawthorne Race Course gained all summer dates except Arlington Million day. In 1986, 1987, and 1988 the track also held these summertime meetings.

In 2020, Hawthorne got approval to become a racino.

=== Bankruptcy and closure ===
In January 2026, The Illinois Racing Board revoked its license due to financial issues. In February 2026, Hawthorne filed for Chapter 11 bankruptcy. Hawthorne stated that they plan to restructure their debt load and seek a buyer for the sale of its assets in an effort to recapitalize their business. On March 19, 2026, Hawthorne announced that they would be reopening for horse racing for the 2026 season, despite operators arguing that Hawthorne still owes them money. On May 29, 2026, Hawthorne argued that they are missing out on state funding primarily due to the JB Pritzker administration steering out money to a rival racetrack. On June 12, 2026, Hawthorne warned that its 290 employees would be laid off if it was unable to sell itself to a buyer.

In July 2026, it was reported that only one entity made a qualified stalking horse offer in bankruptcy court for the Hawthorne property. According to court records, the lone offer was made in June 2026 by an entity called ALLIMAC 2023, LLC, for $90 million. The entity became the winning bidder by default when no other qualified bids were made by the July 14 deadline. When the deadline passed, the Illinois Thoroughbred Horsemen's Association sent out a text message stating that Hawthorne Race Course was "sold to a non-racing entity." Hawthorne ran its final races on July 19, 2026, with the bankruptcy sale order approved five days later.

On August 21, 2026, a bankruptcy judge issued an eviction notice giving all backstretch workers ten days to leave the Hawthorne property. On the same day it was reported that the entity acquiring the property was linked to Digital Realty, an investment trust that operates hundreds of data centers around the world. The track closed for training on August 28, and the last three horses were vanned off the grounds on August 31.

== Physical attributes ==
The track had a one-mile (1.609 km) dirt oval and a seven-furlong (1.408 km) turf course. The main track's home stretch was 1,320 feet, the third longest of any dirt track in the United States — only the home stretches at Los Alamitos Race Course (1,380 feet) and Fair Grounds Race Course (1,346 feet) are longer. This led to the turns being unusually tight: On the dirt oval, the turns were just 1,136 feet long — and on the turf course, 806 feet — the tightest turns of any turf course in the United States.

== TV personalities ==
- Phil Georgeff (1959–1992)
- Jim Miller (1997–2026)
- Mitch Demick (2007–2009)
- Katie Mikolay (2006–2010)
- Nancy Ury (2000–2002)
- Peter Galassi (2002–2026)

== Racing ==
The track ran the following graded stakes:

- Grade 3 – Hawthorne Gold Cup Handicap
- Grade 3 – Illinois Derby
- Grade 3 – Sixty Sails Handicap

Hawthorne also ran the ungraded Bill Hartack Memorial Handicap, which was inaugurated in 2008 and was originally called the National Jockey Club Handicap, as well as the Hawthorne Derby which carried Grade 3 status through 2017.
