= Remington Park Oaks =

- Class: Listed
- Location: Remington Park; Oklahoma City, Oklahoma, United States
- Inaugurated: 1989
- Race type: Thoroughbred - Flat racing
- Website: www.remingtonpark.com

Race information
- Distance: 1 1/16 miles
- Surface: Dirt
- Track: left-handed
- Qualification: Fillies, three years old
- Weight: 122 lbs. with allowances
- Purse: $200,000 (2021)

The Remington Park Oaks is a Listed American Thoroughbred horse race for three years old fillies, over a distance of 1 1/16 miles on the dirt held annually in late September at Remington Park in Oklahoma City, Oklahoma. The event currently carries a purse of $200,000.

== History ==
The race was inaugurated in 1989 at a distance of 1 mile and 70 yards in mid March.

In 1994 the administration of Remington Park moved the event to the turf and lengthened to the distance of 1 1/16 miles.

The event was not held in 1997 and 2002 and in 1996 and 2004 the event was moved off the turf track onto the main track due to inclement conditions. From 1998 the event was reduced to one mile and in 2005 the event was split into two divisions. With the introduction of the casino at Remington Park in 2006, stakes increased. The administration in 2009 reverted the race back to dirt at the current distance of 1 1/16 miles and scheduled the race in the fall. In 2018 the event was upgraded to a Grade III to be the second event with such a classification at Remington Park.

In 2024 the event was downgraded by the Thoroughbred Owners and Breeders Association to Listed status.

== Records ==
Speed record:

- 1 1/16 miles – 1:42.03 – Unbridled Mo (2016)
- 1 mile on the turf – 1:34.89 – More Than Promised (2015)

Margins:

- 9 3/4 lengths – Alpine Princess (2024)

Most wins by a jockey

- 6 – Luis S. Quinonez (1996, 1999, 2001, 2004, 2005, 2006)

Most wins by a trainer

- 4 – Steven M. Asmussen (1999, 2005, 2018, 2019)

Most wins by an owner

- 2 – Diamond G Ranch (2003, 2004)
- 2 – Pin Oak Stable (2006, 2008)
- 2 – Brereton C. Jones (2010, 2015)
- 2 – Exline-Border Racing (2017, 2021)
- 2 – Madaket Stables (2023, 2024)

== Winners ==
Year	Winner	Jockey	Trainer	Owner	Distance	Time	Purse	Grade	Ref
2024	Alpine Princess	Florent Geroux	Brad H. Cox	Full of Run Racing II & Madaket Stables	1 1/16 miles	1:43.12	$200,000	Listed	
2023	Honor D Lady	Tyler Conner	Saffie Joseph Jr.	Final Furlong Farm & Madaket Stables	1 1/16 miles	1:46.00	$200,000	III	
2022	Hits Pricey Legacy	Jose L. Alvarez	C. R. Trout	C. R. Trout	1 1/16 miles	1:45.39	$210,000	III	
2021	Lady Mystify	Flavien Prat	Peter Eurton	Exline-Border Racing, SAF Racing & Richard Hausman	1 1/16 miles	1:44.13	$200,000	III	
2020	Envoutante	David Cabrera	Kenneth G. McPeek	Walking L Thoroughbreds & Three Chimneys Farm	1 1/16 miles	1:43.36	$100,000	III	
2019	Lady Apple	Ricardo Santana Jr.	Steven M. Asmussen	Phoenix Thoroughbred III and KatieRich Stable	1 1/16 miles	1:43.65	$195,200	III	
2018	She's a Julie	Ricardo Santana Jr.	Steven M. Asmussen	Whispering Oaks Farm, Team Hanley, Bradley Thoroughbreds, Madaket Stables	1 1/16 miles	1:43.36	$200,000	III	
2017	Champagne Room	Mario Gutierrez	Peter Eurton	S. Alesia, R. Christensen, Ciaglia Racing, Exline-Border Racing, Gulliver Racing	1 1/16 miles	1:42.05	$200,000	Listed	
2016	Unbridled Mo	John R. Velazquez	Todd A. Pletcher	Red Oak Stable	1 1/16 miles	1:42.03	$200,000	Listed	
2015	Include Betty	Drayden Van Dyke	Thomas F. Proctor	Brereton C. Jones & Timothy Thornton	1 1/16 miles	1:44.83	$200,000	Listed	
2014	Shanon Nicole	Rosie Napravnik	Michael J. Maker	Connie M. Apostelos	1 1/16 miles	1:44.33	$200,000	Listed	
2013	Montana Native	Terry J. Thompson	Kenneth G. McPeek	Ghostzapper Racing	1 1/16 miles	1:43.68	$200,000	Listed	
2012	Sticks Wondergirl	Jon Kenton Court	Greg Burchell	Alvin D. Haynes & Beth Burchell	1 1/16 miles	1:44.05	$250,000	Listed	
2011	Tourmaline	Dean P. Butler	Bernell B. Rhone	Mike Walker & Wayne Ukens	1 1/16 miles	1:42.76	$250,000	Listed	
2010	No Such Word	Terry J. Thompson	Cindy Jones	Brereton C. Jones	1 1/16 miles	1:43.24	$200,000	Listed	
2009	Payton d'Oro	Terry J. Thompson	J. Larry Jones	Michael Pressley, John Ferris, Mike Riley, Lee Robey & Barry Higgins	1 1/16 miles	1:44.70	$200,980	Listed	
2008	Euphony	M. Clifton Berry	Donnie K. Von Hemel	Pin Oak Stable	1 mile	1:38.43	$75,000	Listed	
2007	Alice Belle	Richard E. Eramia	John G. Locke	Peggy & Albert Serviss	1 mile	1:38.31	$76,470	Listed	
2006	Brownie Points	Luis S. Quinonez	Donnie K. Von Hemel	Pin Oak Stable	1 mile	1:36.77	$100,000	Listed	
2005	More Than Promised	Luis S. Quinonez	Steven M. Asmussen	Vinery Stables	1 mile	1:34.89	$40,000		Division 1
2005	Where's Bailey	Glen Murphy	W. Bret Calhoun	Turf Express & Robert L. Beck	1 mile	1:35.20	$40,650		Division 2
2004	Road to Mandalay	Luis S. Quinonez	Rick S. Engel	Diamond G Ranch	1 mile	1:39.19	$40,000		Off turf
2003	Captain's Daughter	Nena Matz	Rick S. Engel	Diamond G Ranch	1 mile	1:38.91	$39,800		
2002	Race not held								
2001	Western Delight	Luis S. Quinonez	Randy Oberlander	Clark O. Brewster	1 mile	1:37.42	$30,000		
2000	Darlin Dixie	Donald R. Pettinger	Donnie K. Von Hemel	Don C. McNeill	1 mile	1:37.36	$40,000		
1999	Carlitta	Luis S. Quinonez	Steven M. Asmussen	Verne H. Winchell	1 mile	1:37.00	$50,840	Listed	
1998	Storm Me September	Donald R. Pettinger	Steve Hobby	Barbara R. & John E. Smicklas	1 mile	1:38.20	$40,000		
1997	Race not held								
1996	Vengeful Val	Luis S. Quinonez	John L. Geyer	Richard A. Bell	1 1/16 miles	1:46.00	$40,600		Off turf
1995	War Thief	Timothy T. Doocy	Clinton C. Stuart	Estate of Neil V. Lane	1 1/16 miles	1:44.60	$40,000		
1994	Looking for Heaven	Robert Dean Williams	Wade L. White	Ronald L. Hendrickson	1 1/16 miles	1:42.80	$51,250	Listed	
1993	Dixie Fine	Duane Michael Salvino	Farrel J. Lundy	Farrel J. Lundy	1 mile and 70 yards	1:44.00	$50,900	Listed	
1992	Bionic Soul	Patrick W. Steinberg	Thomas Victor Smith	Dale V. Nelson	1 mile and 70 yards	1:41.40	$50,900	Listed	
1991	Special Test	Patrick W. Steinberg	Danny P. Mirabal	DonRey	1 mile and 70 yards	1:42.50	$57,450	Listed	
1990	Train Robbery	K. Keith Allen	D. Wayne Lukas	Overbrook Farm & D. Wayne Lukas	1 mile and 70 yards	1:42.20	$50,000		
1989	Wave to the Queen	Dale W. Cordova	Paul H. Murphy	Topwater Stables	1 mile and 70 yards	1:42.20	$54,400		

Legend:
Dirt Turf

== See also ==
List of American and Canadian Graded races
