= Ouija Board Handicap =

- Class: Grade III
- Location: Lone Star Park; Grand Prairie, Texas, United States
- Inaugurated: 1997
- Race type: Thoroughbred - Flat racing
- Website: www.lonestarpark.com

Race information
- Distance: 1 mile (8 furlongs)
- Surface: Turf
- Track: Left-handed
- Qualification: Fillies & Mare, 3-years-old & up
- Weight: Assigned
- Purse: $200,000

The Ouija Board Handicap is an American Thoroughbred horse race held annually on Memorial Day at Lone Star Park in Grand Prairie, Texas.

A Grade III event since 2003, it is contested on turf over a distance of one mile (8 furlongs) and is open to fillies and mares, age three and older.

Inaugurated in 1997 as the Fort Worth Handicap, it was contested at a distance of 1 1/8 miles until 1999 when it was renamed the Prestonwood Distaff Handicap and set at a distance of one mile. From 2000 through 2006 it was raced as the Winstar Distaff Handicap. In 2007, the race was renamed to honor superstar filly Ouija Board, the European Horse of the Year in 2004 and 2006 who won the Breeders' Cup Filly & Mare Turf in 2004 when the Breeders' Cup races were hosted by Lone Star Park.

== Records ==
Speed record: (at current distance of 1 mile)

- 1:32.81 - Wasted Tears (2009) (New stakes and course record)

Most wins:

- Wasted Tears (2009, 2010, 2011)

Most wins by an owner:

- Bart B. Evans (2009, 2010, 2011)

Most wins by a jockey:

- 2- Cliff Berry (2001, 2010)

Most wins by a trainer:

- 2 - Bart B. Evans (2009, 2010)
- 2 - Steve Asmussen (1999, 2004)
- 2 - Donnie K. Von Hemel (2001, 2008)

== Winners ==
Year	Winner	Age	Jockey	Trainer	Owner	Time
2011	Wasted Tears	6	Julien Leparoux	Bart B. Evans	Bart B. Evans	1:34.06
2010	Wasted Tears	5	Cliff Berry	Bart B. Evans	Bart B. Evans	1:33.25
2009	Wasted Tears	4	Eguard Tejera	Bart B. Evans	Bart B. Evans	1:32.81
2008	Brownie Points	5	Luis Quinonez	Donnie K. Von Hemel	Pin Oak Stable	1:35.82
2007	Lady of Venice	4	Garrett Gomez	Patrick Biancone	Martin S. Schwartz	1:38.32
2006	Sweet Talker	4	Ramon Dominguez	H. Graham Motion	Courtlandt Farms	1:38.66
2005	Katdogawn	5	Jerry Bailey	Wallace Dollase	Jim Ford Inc./John Cuchna	1:39.53
2004	Academic Angel	5	Shane Sellers	Steve Asmussen	Cash Asmussen	1:35.98
2003	Eagle Lake	5	Gerard Melancon	Cole Norman	Turf Express Inc.	1:43.02
2002	Queen of Wilshire	6	David Flores	Darrell Vienna	E A Ranches	1:38.96
2001	Voladora	6	Cliff Berry	Donnie K. Von Hemel	George O. Kleier	1:42.23
2000	Mumtaz	4	Victor Espinoza	Thomas M. Amoss	Bates, Hendricks, et al.	1:37.28
1999	Heritage Of Gold	4	Casey Lambert	Steve Asmussen	Jack Garey	1:37.75
1998	Arctica	4	E.J. Perrodin	Tony J. Richey	Royce Roberts	1:46.53
1997	Fresa	5	Corey Lanerie	Bill Stice	Tom Ball	1:46.68
