= Azeri Stakes =

- Class: Grade II
- Location: Oaklawn Park Race Track; Hot Springs, Arkansas, United States
- Inaugurated: 1987 (as Oaklawn Budweiser Breeders' Cup Handicap)
- Race type: Thoroughbred – Flat racing
- Website: www.oaklawn.com

Race information
- Distance: 1 1/16 miles
- Surface: Dirt
- Track: left-handed
- Qualification: Fillies & Mares, four-years-old & up
- Weight: 124 lbs with allowances
- Purse: $400,000 (since 2024)

The Azeri Stakes is a Grade II American Thoroughbred horse race for fillies and mares that are four years old or older, over a distance of one and one-sixteenth miles on the dirt track held annually in March at Oaklawn Park in Hot Springs, Arkansas. The event currently carries a purse of $400,000.

== History ==
The inaugural running of the event was on 3 April 1987 as the Oaklawn Budweiser Breeders' Cup Handicap with sponsorship for Budweiser and the Breeders' Cup. The event was won by North Sider who was ridden by US Hall of Fame jockey Angel Cordero Jr. and trained by US Hall of Fame trainer D. Wayne Lukas in a time of 1:42 1/5. North Sider later that year would capture US Champion Older Female Horse.

The event was upgraded to a Grade III event in 1990 but was downgraded back to Listed in 1995 for five runnings.

Budweiser continued sponsoring the event until 1995 while the Breeders' Cup sponsored the event until 2007 which reflected in the name of the event.

The event was renamed Azeri Stakes in 2005 to honor Azeri, the American Horse of the Year of 2002, and the American Champion Older Female Horse three years running: 2002, 2003, and 2004.

This race was upgraded to a Grade II for its 2014 running.

Several notable winners went on to become champions. The 2011 winner Havre de Grace would later defeat males in the GI Woodward Stakes and win American Horse of the Year in 2011. The 2019 winner Midnight Bisou gained US Champion Older Female Horse honors.

== Records ==
Speed record:

- 1:42.01 – Sister Act (1999)

Margins:

- 6 1/4 lengths – Serengeti Empress (2020)

Most wins:

- 2 – Halo America (1995, 1997)
- 2 – Heritage of Gold (2000, 2001)
- 2 – Tiz Miz Sue (2012, 2013)

Most wins by a jockey:

- 3 – Calvin Borel (1997, 1999, 2010)
- 3 – Joseph Rocco Jr. (2012, 2013, 2016)

Most wins by a trainer:

- 4 – D. Wayne Lukas (1987, 1991, 1992, 2023)

Most wins by an owner:

- 3 – John A. Franks (1994, 1995, 1997)

== Winners ==
Year	Winner	Age	Jockey	Trainer	Owner	Distance	Time	Purse	Grade	Ref
Azeri Stakes
2026	Majestic Oops	6	Francisco Arrieta	Dan Ward	Medallion Racing, Evan Trommer, Agave Racing Stable & Sheila Regan	1 1/16 miles	1:43.36	$400,000	II	
2025	Thorpedo Anna	4	Brian J. Hernandez Jr.	Kenneth G. McPeek	Brookdale Racing, Mark Edwards, Judy B. Hicks & Magdalena Racing	1 1/16 miles	1:44.02	$400,000	II	
2024	Tiny Temper	4	James Graham	Dallas Stewart	Mark H. & Nancy W Stanley	1 1/16 miles	1:43.26	$400,000	II	
2023	Secret Oath	4	Tyler Gaffalione	D. Wayne Lukas	Briland Farm	1 1/16 miles	1:43.26	$350,000	II	
2022	Ce Ce	6	Victor Espinoza	Michael W. McCarthy	Bo Hirsch	1 1/16 miles	1:43.55	$350,000	II	
2021	Shedaresthedevil	4	Florent Geroux	Brad H. Cox	Flurry Racing Stables, Qatar Racing Limited & Big Aut Farms	1 1/16 miles	1:42.57	$350,000	II	
2020	Serengeti Empress	4	Joseph Talamo	Thomas M. Amoss	Joel Politi	1 1/16 miles	1:44.46	$350,000	II	
2019	Midnight Bisou	4	Mike E. Smith	Steven M. Asmussen	Bloom Racing Stable, Madaket Stables & Allen Racing	1 1/16 miles	1:42.72	$343,000	II	
2018	Martini Glass	5	Paco Lopez	Keith Nations	Vince Campanella & Nation's Racing Stable	1 1/16 miles	1:42.95	$350,000	II	
2017	Streamline	5	Chris Landeros	Brian Williamson	Nancy A. Vanier & Cartwright Thoroughbreds V	1 1/16 miles	1:43.67	$350,000	II	
2016	Call Pat	6	Joseph Rocco Jr.	Brad H. Cox	Miller Racing	1 1/16 miles	1:44.44	$350,000	II	
2015	Gold Medal Dancer	5	Luis S. Quinonez	Donnie K. Von Hemel	Pin Oak Stable	1 1/16 miles	1:45.92	$294,000	II	
2014	Close Hatches	4	Joel Rosario	William I. Mott	Juddmonte Farms	1 1/16 miles	1:44.34	$200,000	II	
2013	Tiz Miz Sue	6	Joseph Rocco Jr.	Steve Hobby	Cres Ran	1 1/16 miles	1:45.26	$147,000	III	
2012	Tiz Miz Sue	5	Joseph Rocco Jr.	Steve Hobby	Cres Ran	1 1/16 miles	1:43.58	$147,000	III	
2011	Havre de Grace	4	Ramon A. Dominguez	J. Larry Jones	Fox Hills Farms	1 1/16 miles	1:42.02	$150,000	III	
2010	Freedom Star	4	Calvin H. Borel	Bob Baffert	George Krikorian	1 1/16 miles	1:44.09	$149,750	III	
2009	Acoma	4	Julien R. Leparoux	David M. Carroll	Helen Alexander & Helen K. Groves	1 1/16 miles	1:42.55	$138,500	III	
2008	Hystericalady	5	Robby Albarado	Jerry Hollendorfer	Rancho San Miguel, Jerry Hollendorfer & George Todaro	1 1/16 miles,	1:43.86	$171,500	III	
2007	India	4	Christopher P. DeCarlo	Todd A. Pletcher	Lyon Stables	1 1/16 miles	1:44.37	$175,000	III	
2006	Round Pond	4	Stewart Elliott	John C. Servis	Fox Hill Farms	1 1/16 miles	1:43.93	$173,500	III	
2005	Injustice	4	Luis S. Quinonez	Wayne M. Catalano	Turf Express, Darrell & Evelyn Yates	1 1/16 miles	1:43.40	$175,000	III	
Oaklawn Breeders' Cup Stakes
2004	Golden Sonata	5	Carlos H. Marquez Jr.	Morris G. Nicks	James C. Spence	1 1/16 miles	1:44.32	$200,000	III	
2003	Bien Nicole	5	Donald R. Pettinger	Donnie K. Von Hemel	John & Kristine Richter	1 1/16 miles	1:44.19	$194,000	III	
2002	Ask Me No Secrets	4	Mike E. Smith	David E. Hofmans	Earl H. Shultz	1 1/16 miles	1:44.56	$200,000	III	
2001	Heritage of Gold	6	Robby Albarado	Thomas M. Amoss	Jack Garey	1 1/16 miles	1:44.20	$200,000	III	
2000	Heritage of Gold	5	Shane Sellers	Thomas M. Amoss	Jack Garey	1 1/16 miles	1:44.15	$192,000	III	
1999	Sister Act	4	Calvin H. Borel	Jeffrey N. Jacobs	Choctaw Racing & Duncan Taylor	1 1/16 miles	1:42.01	$120,000	Listed	
1998	Turn to the Queen	5	Timothy T. Doocy	Kenny P. Smith	Dr. K. K. Jayaraman & Dr. Vilasini D. Jayaraman.	1 1/16 miles	1:44.76	$147,000	Listed	
Oaklawn Breeders' Cup Handicap
1997	§ Halo America	7	Calvin H. Borel	Bobby C. Barnett	John A. Franks	1 1/16 miles	1:42.18	$150,000	Listed	
1996	Belle of Cozzene	4	Donald R. Pettinger	Steve Hobby	John E. & Barbara R. Smicklas	1 1/16 miles	1:43.32	$149,750	Listed	
1995	§ Halo America	5	Weldon T. Cloninger Jr.	Bobby C. Barnett	John A. Franks	1 1/16 miles	1:42.59	$148,500	Listed	
1994	§ Morning Meadow	4	Shane P. Romero	Bobby C. Barnett	John A. Franks	1 1/16 miles	1:44.60	$157,750	III	
1993	Guiza	6	Corey Nakatani	Robert J. Frankel	Robert Witt	1 1/16 miles	1:44.79	$156,000	III	
1992	Cuddles	4	David Guillory	D. Wayne Lukas	Overbrook Farm	1 1/16 miles	1:43.82	$157,500	III	
1991	A Wild Ride	4	Pat Day	D. Wayne Lukas	Zenya Yoshida	1 1/16 miles	1:42.31	$157,950	III	
1990	A Penny Is a Penny	5	Aaron Gryder	Steven L. Morguelan	David L. Levitch	1 1/16 miles	1:43.60	$158,900	III	
1989	Savannah's Honor	4	Jerry D. Bailey	Richard J. Lundy	Allen E. Paulson	1 1/16 miles	1:45.00	$158,200		
1988	Ms. Margi	4	Jerry D. Bailey	Philip M. Hauswald	Edward A. Cox Jr.	1 1/16 miles	1:42.20	$158,150		
1987	North Sider	5	Angel Cordero Jr.	D. Wayne Lukas	D. Wayne Lukas & Paul Paternostro	1 1/16 miles	1:42.20	$133,120		

Notes:
§ Ran as an entry

== See also ==
- List of American and Canadian Graded races

== External sites ==
Oaklawn Park Media Guide 2021
