= Amsterdam Stakes =

- Class: Grade II
- Location: Saratoga Race Course; Saratoga Springs, New York, United States
- Inaugurated: 1993 (as Screen King Stakes at Belmont Park)
- Race type: Thoroughbred – Flat racing
- Website: NYRA

Race information
- Distance: 6 1/2 furlongs
- Surface: Dirt
- Track: left-handed
- Qualification: Three-year-olds
- Weight: 124 lbs with allowances
- Purse: $200,000

The Amsterdam Stakes is a Grade II American Thoroughbred horse race for three-year-old horses over the distance of 6 1/2 furlongs on the dirt, scheduled annually in August at Saratoga Race Course in Saratoga Springs, New York. The event currently carries a purse of $200,000.

== History ==
The event was inaugurated at Belmont Park on 17 July 1993 as the Screen King Stakes and was run over a distance of seven furlongs and the winner Evil Bear was ridden by United States' Racing Hall of Fame jockey José A. Santos in a time of 1:22.09. The event honored Screen King who had won his first four races including the Grade III Swift Stakes at Aqueduct Racetrack.

The following year the event moved to Saratoga and the distance was decreased to six furlongs and split into two divisions.

In 1998 the event was renamed for Amsterdam, New York, a town about 26 miles from Saratoga Springs in Upstate New York. That same year the race was upgraded to a Grade III and was run in split divisions. In 2001 the event was upgraded to Grade II.

Of the notable winners of this event are 1996 winner Distorted Humor who much later on in 2011 became Leading sire in North America and in 2017 the Leading broodmare sire in North America. In 2009 Quality Road resumed after injury after winning the Grade I Florida Derby missing all three legs of the U.S. Triple Crown series and winning the event in track record time of 1:13.74 breaking Saratoga's 30-year track record.

An earlier edition of the Amsterdam Stakes was run at Saratoga from 1901 through at least 1915 that was open to horses age three and older.

== Records ==
Speed record:

- 6 1/2 furlongs: 1:13.74 – Quality Road (2009)
- 6 furlongs: 1:08.50 – Yaupon (2020)

Margins:

- 12 1/2 lengths – Shancelot (2019)

Most wins by an owner:

- 2 – Lewis G. Lakin (In partnership) (2001, 2002)
- 2 – Fox Hill Farms (2008, 2014 in partnership)

Most wins by a jockey:

- 4 – Pat Day (1995, 1996, 2000, 2002)
- 4 - Joel Rosario (2013, 2016, 2020, 2021)

Most wins by a trainer:

- 6 - Steven M. Asmussen (2004, 2005, 2015, 2020, 2021, 2022)

== Winners ==
Year	Winner	Jockey	Trainer	Owner	Distance	Time	Purse	Grade	Ref
Amsterdam Stakes
2026	Local Knowledge	John R. Velazquez	Todd A. Pletcher	Spendthrift Farm	6 1/2 furlongs	1:14.89	$250,000	II	
2025	Smoken Wicked	Brian Hernandez Jr.	Dallas Stewart	Valene Farms	6 1/2 furlongs	1:15.64	$200,000	II	
2024	World Record	Flavien Prat	Rodolphe Brisset	Siena Farm & WinStar Farm	6 1/2 furlongs	1:16.20	$194,000	II	
2023	New York Thunder	Tyler Gaffalione	Jorge Delgado	AMO Racing USA	6 1/2 furlongs	1:14.65	$194,000	II	
2022	Gunite	Tyler Gaffalione	Steven M. Asmussen	Winchell Thoroughbreds	6 1/2 furlongs	1:15.75	$200,000	II	
2021	Jackie's Warrior	Joel Rosario	Steven M. Asmussen	J. Kirk & Judy Robison	6 1/2 furlongs	1:15:46	$200,000	II	
2020	Yaupon	Joel Rosario	Steven M. Asmussen	L. William & Corinne Heiligbrodt	6 furlongs	1:08.50	$150,000	II	
2019	Shancelot	Emisael Jaramillo	Jorge Navarro	Ivan Rodriguez, Albert Crawford & Michelle Crawford	6 1/2 furlongs	1:14.01	$200,000	II	
2018	Promises Fulfilled	Luis Saez	Dale L. Romans	Robert J. Baron	6 1/2 furlongs	1:15.18	$200,000	III	
2017	Coal Front	John R. Velazquez	Todd A. Pletcher	Robert V. LaPenta & Head of Plains Partners	6 1/2 furlongs	1:16.05	$200,000	II	
2016	Mind Your Biscuits	Joel Rosario	Robert N. Falcone Jr.	J Stables, Scott, Hope & Daniel Summers	6 1/2 furlongs	1:15.25	$200,000	II	
2015	Holy Boss	Ricardo Santana Jr.	Steven M. Asmussen	Jerry Durant	6 1/2 furlongs	1:15.38	$200,000	II	
2014	Coup de Grace	Rosie Napravnik	J. Larry Jones	Fox Hill Farms	6 1/2 furlongs	1:15.32	$200,000	II	
2013	Forty Tales	Joel Rosario	Todd A. Pletcher	Perretti Racing Stable	6 1/2 furlongs	1:15.64	$200,000	II	
2012	Currency Swap	Rajiv Maragh	Teresa M. Pompay	Klaravich Stables & William H. Lawrence	6 1/2 furlongs	1:15.33	$200,000	II	
2011	Caleb's Posse	Rajiv Maragh	Donnie K. Von Hemel	McNeill Stables & Cheyenne Stables	6 1/2 furlongs	1:15.88	$150,000	II	
2010	Discreetly Mine	John R. Velazquez	Todd A. Pletcher	E. Paul Robsham Stables	6 1/2 furlongs	1:14.12	$150,000	II	
2009	Quality Road	John R. Velazquez	Todd A. Pletcher	Edward P. Evans	6 1/2 furlongs	1:13.74	$150,000	II	
2008	Kodiak Kowboy	Gabriel Saez	J. Larry Jones	Vinery Stables & Fox Hill Farm	6 1/2 furlongs	1:15.56	$150,000	II	
2007	Most Distinguished	Rafael Bejarano	Nicholas P. Zito	Live Oak Plantation	6 1/2 furlongs	1:15.97	$150,000	II	
2006	Court Folly	Calvin H. Borel	Ian R. Wilkes	Robert Manfuso	6 1/2 furlongs	1:16.14	$142,500	II	
2005	Santana Strings	Eibar Coa	Steven M. Asmussen	Millennium Farms	6 furlongs	1:10.18	$150,000	II	
2004	Bwana Charlie	Shane Sellers	Steven M. Asmussen	Heiligbrodt Racing Stable	6 furlongs	1:09.40	$150,000	II	
2003	Zavata	Jerry D. Bailey	Patrick L. Biancone	Michael B. Tabor	6 furlongs	1:08.64	$150,000	II	
2002	Listen Here	Pat Day	William I. Mott	Kim and Rodney Nardelli & Lewis G. Lakin	6 furlongs	1:09.58	$150,000	II	
2001	City Zip	Jorge F. Chavez	Linda L. Rice	Charles R. Thompson, Carl Bowling, Becky Thomas & Lewis Lakin	6 furlongs	1:11.03	$135,700	II	
2000	Personal First	Pat Day	David E. Paulus	Dianne Waldron, Leah Killingworth and William Shively	6 furlongs	1:09.33	$110,000	III	
1999	Successful Appeal	Edgar S. Prado	John C. Kimmel	Starview Stable	6 furlongs	1:10.20	$83,900	III	
At Saratoga – Screen King Stakes
1998	Secret Firm	Edgar S. Prado	H. Graham Motion	Buckram Oak Farm	6 furlongs	1:10.28	$82,650	III	Dead heat
1998	Mint	Eibar Coa	Mohammed Moubarak	Mea Culpa Stables	6 furlongs	1:10.28	$82,650	III	Dead heat
1997	Oro de Mexico	Chris Antley	Philip M. Serpe	John T. Dee	6 furlongs	1:10.58	$82,125	Listed	
1996	Distorted Humor	Pat Day	W. Elliott Walden	Prestonwood Farm	6 furlongs	1:09.13	$54,700	Listed	
1995	Kings Fiction	Pat Day	H. Allen Jerkens	Hardwicke Stables, et al.	6 furlongs	1:09.75	$53,750	Listed	
1994	Chimes Band	Jerry D. Bailey	D. Wayne Lukas	Fares Farm	6 furlongs	1:09.90	$53,876	Listed	Division 1
1994	Mr. Shawklit	Herb McCauley	Frank LaBoccetta	Edward Anchel	6 furlongs	1:10.80	$53,876	Listed	Division 2
At Belmont Park – Screen King Stakes
1993	Evil Bear	José A. Santos	Robert E. Reid Jr.	Joseph Sabini	7 furlongs	1:22.09	$48,000		

== See also ==
List of American and Canadian Graded races
