= Prairie Meadows Cornhusker Handicap =

- Class: Grade III
- Location: Prairie Meadows; Altoona, Iowa, United States
- Inaugurated: 1966
- Race type: Thoroughbred – Flat racing
- Website: www.prairiemeadows.com

Race information
- Distance: 1 1/8 miles (9 furlongs)
- Surface: Dirt
- Track: left-handed
- Qualification: Three-year-olds and up
- Weight: Handicap
- Purse: $300,000

The Prairie Meadows Cornhusker Handicap is an American Grade III thoroughbred horse race held annually at the end of June at Prairie Meadows in Altoona, Iowa. The race is open to horses age three years and older and currently offers a purse of $300,000. Raced at a distance of 11/8 miles on dirt, from 1966 through 1973 it was run at 11/16 miles.

Inaugurated in 1966, the Cornhusker Handicap was originally run at the Ak-Sar-Ben Racetrack in Omaha, Nebraska which closed in 1995. The first edition was won by Royal Gunner who was ridden by future U.S. Racing Hall of Fame inductee Bill Hartack.

Julie Krone was the first female jockey to compete in the Cornhusker Handicap and the first female jockey to win it when she captured the 1988 edition aboard Palace March.

The Cornhusker Handicap purse was reduced to $100,00 in 2020 due to the COVID-19 pandemic along with the Iowa Derby and Iowa Oaks purses.

== Records ==
Time record: (at current distance of 1 1/8 miles)

- 1:46.62 – Beboppin Baby (1998)

Most wins:

- 2 – Vale of Tears (1968, 1969) and Joey Bob (1972, 1973)

Most wins by a Jockey:

- 4 – Larry J. Durousseau (1967, 1968, 1969, 1970)

Most wins by a Trainer:

- 3 – Brad H. Cox (2014, 2020, 2021)
- 3 – Albert Vizcaya (1968, 1969, 1970)
- 3 – Jack Van Berg (1972, 1973, 1985)
- 3 – Steve Asmussen (2013, 2017, 2024)

Most wins by an Owner:

- 3 – Mrs. Raymond Bauer (1968, 1969, 1970)

== Winners ==
Year	Winner	Age	Jockey	Trainer	Owner	Distance	Time	Win$	Gr.
2026	Navajo Warrior	5	Micah J. Husbands	Saffie A. Joseph Jr.	BAG Racing Stables, Miller Racing, Dr. Derek K. Paul, Mathis Stable, Paul Braverman and Timothy Pinch	1 1/8	1:48.07	$179,400	G3
2025	Cornishman	4	Glenn W. Corbett	Dan L. McFarlane	Joseph A. Schumer	11/8	1:50.10	$178,000	G3
2024	Red Route One	4	Cristian A. Torres	Steve Asmussen	Winchell Thoroughbreds	11/8	1:49.62	$178,000	G3
2023	Giant Game	4	Martin Garcia	Dale L. Romans	West Point Thoroughbreds & Albaugh Family Stables	11/8	1:49.86	$178,800	G3
2022	Officiating	4	Javier Castellano	Saffie A. Joseph Jr.	Vegso Racing Stable	11/8	1:50.04	$180,000	G3
2021	Knicks Go	4	Joel Rosario	Brad H. Cox	Korea Racing Authority	11/8	1:47.33	$180,000	G3
2020	Night Ops	4	Martin Garcia	Brad H. Cox	Steve Landers Racing LLC	11/8	1:48.30	$59,100	G3
2019	Sir Anthony	4	Pedro Cotto Jr.	Anthony T. Mitchell	Richard Otto Stables Inc.	11/8	1:48.98	$178,800	G3
2018	Remembering Rita	4	Alex Birzer	Doug L. Anderson	Jeral Keith Adams	11/8	1:49.36	$179,400	G3
2017	Iron Fist	5	Ricardo Santana Jr.	Steve Asmussen	Whispering Oaks Farm	11/8	1:47.36	$179,400	G3
2016	Smack Smack	5	Shane Laviolette	Don Von Hemel	Dream Walkin Farms	11/8	1:50.28	$179,100	G3
2015	Golden Lad	5	Javier Castellano	Todd A. Pletcher	E. Paul Robsham Stables	11/8	1:49.86	$180,000	G3
2014	Carve	4	Jesús Castañón	Brad H. Cox	Michael Langford	11/8	1:50.56	$180,000	G3
2013	Prayer for Relief	5	Ricardo Santana Jr.	Steven Asmussen	Zayat Stables	11/8	1:49.96	$180,000	G3
2012	Fort Larned	4	Brian Hernandez Jr.	Ian Wilkes	Janis R. Whitham	11/8	1:47.42	$180,000	G3
2011	Headache	5	Miguel Mena	Mike Maker	Kenneth and Sarah Ramsey	11/8	1:47.83	$180,000	G3
2010	Shadowbdancing	5	Eusebio Razo Jr.	Terrel Gore	RNB Racing LLC (Robert E. & Nancy J. Bartels)	11/8	1:48.24	$180,000	G3
2009	Jonesboro	7	Cliff Berry	Randy L. Morse	Michael Langford	11/8	1:48.01	$180,000	G2
2008	Wayzata Bay	6	Israel Ocampo	Judi Hicklin	World Thoroughbreds Racing Inc.	11/8	1:48.47	$180,000	G2
2007	Dry Martini	4	Elvis Trujillo	Barclay Tagg	Carol & George Nyren	11/8	1:48.41	$180,000	G2
2006	Siphon City	4	Elvis Trujillo	Daniel C. Hurtak	Ray J. Larkin	11/8	1:47.76	$180,000	G2
2005	Lord of the Game	4	Eusebio Razo Jr.	Tommy Tomillo	2 Blondes, Inc.	11/8	1:49.94	$180,000	G2
2004	Roses in May	4	Mark Guidry	Dale L. Romans	Kenneth and Sarah Ramsey	11/8	1:46.63	$180,000	G3
2003	Tenpins	5	Robby Albarado	Donald R. Winfree	Joseph V. Vitello	11/8	1:48.39	$210,000	G3
2002	Mr John	4	Mark Guidry	Elliott Walden	Thomas F. Van Meter Jr.	11/8	1:47.97	$240,000	G3
2001	Euchre	5	Garrett Gomez	Robert J. Frankel	Stronach Stables	11/8	1:47.72	$180,000	G3
2000	Sir Bear	7	Eibar Coa	Ralph Ziadie	Barbara Smollin	11/8	1:48.49	$180,000	G3
1999	Nite Dreamer	4	Robby Albarado	Niall O'Callaghan	Henry E. Pabst	11/8	1:48.85	$210,000	G3
1998	Beboppin Baby	5	Jesse Campbell	Joe Kasperski Jr.	Lawrence Karp	11/8	1:46.62	$180,000	G3
1997	Semoran	4	David Flores	Bob Baffert	Donald R. Dizney	11/8	1:48.47	$120,000	G3
1996	Race not held								
1995	Powerful Punch	6	Curt Bourque	Harvey L. Vanier	Russell L. Reineman	11/8	1:49.80	$90,000	G3
1994	Zeeruler	6	Robert N. Lester	Donnie K. Von Hemel	John A. Franks	11/8	1:50.20	$75,000	G3
1993	Link	5	Ronald Ardoin	Tom Amoss	Stewart Madison	11/8	1:50.40	$75,000	G3
1992	Irish Swap	5	Bruce Poyadou	Joseph E. Broussard	Randall Hendricks	11/8	1:47.80	$75,000	G3
1991	Black Tie Affair	5	Pat Day	Ernie T. Poulos	Jeff Sullivan	11/8	1:48.60	$75,000	G3
1990	Dispersal	4	Jorge Velásquez	Bud Delp	Tom Meyerhoff	11/8	1:50.00	$90,000	G3
1989	Blue Buckaroo	6	Shane Sellers	Harvey L. Vanier	Russell L. Reineman	11/8	1:49.40	$120,000	G2
1988	Palace March	4	Julie Krone	William I. Mott	Bertram R. Firestone	11/8	1:49.00	$120,000	G2
1987	Bolshoi Boy	4	Chris Antley	Howard M. Tesher	John Greathouse Jr. & Arthur Belford	11/8	1:48.40	$120,000	G2
1986	Gourami	4	Timothy Doocy	Lin A. Wheeler	Vistas Stables (Berry Gordy)	11/8	1:49.40	$150,000	G2
1985	Gate Dancer	4	Chris McCarron	Jack Van Berg	Kenneth Opstein	11/8	1:48.60	$100,800	G2
1984	Timeless Native	4	Dale Brumfield	Bud Delp	Hawksworth Farm (Harry Meyerhoff)	11/8	1:49.40	$90,000	G2
1983	Win Stat	6	David Pettinger	Donnie K. Von Hemel	Russell E. Caston JR. & Norman Ruback	11/8	1:53.20	$92,978	G2
1982	Recusant	4	Ronald J. Hirdes Jr.	Michael B. Ball	Donamire Farm (Donald & Mira Ball)	11/8	1:51.60	$92,895	G2
1981	Summer Advocate	4	Kenneth Jones	Michael B. Ball	W. L. Floyd	11/8	1:48.20	$93,142	G2
1980	Hold Your Tricks	5	David Pettinger	J. Bert Sonnier	Mabar Farm (Harry Katz)	11/8	1:49.20	$88,687	G2
1979	Star de Naskra	4	Jeffrey Fell	Richard D. Ferris	Carlyle J. Lancaster	11/8	1:48.40	$90,613	G2
1978	True Statement	4	Bryan Fann	John J. Weipert	Elmendorf Farm (Maxwell Gluck)	11/8	1:48.20	$60,913	G2
1977	Private Thoughts	4	Ronnie R. Perez	Gregory E. Sanders	Sandera Farm	11/8	1:48.00	$62,783	G3
1976	Dragset	5	Sam Maple	Glenn L. Hild	James Manning	11/8	1:49.00	$60,500	G3
1975	Stonewalk	4	Ron Turcotte	Daniel J. Lopez	Timberland Stable	11/8	1:48.40	$59,290	G3
1974	Blazing Gypsey	5	Salistino Burgos	Charles Karlin	High Country Stable	11/8	1:49.60	$57,963	G3
1973	Joey Bob	5	Leroy Moyers	Jack Van Berg	M. H. Van Berg Stables & Joe Adcock	11/16	1:42.80	$30,828	G3
1972	Joey Bob	4	Leroy Moyers	Jack Van Berg	M. H. Van Berg Stables & Joe Adcock	11/16	1:42.60	$31,213	
1971	Action Getter	4	Kenneth Jones	Bob G. Dunham	E. V. Benjamin & J. Merrick Jones Jr.	11/16	1:44.00	$31,034	
1970	Blazing Silk	6	Larry J. Durousseau	Albert Vizcaya	Mrs. Raymond Bauer	11/16	1:42.60	$31,433	
1969	Vale of Tears	6	Larry J. Durousseau	Albert Vizcaya	Mrs. Raymond Bauer	11/16	1:42.20	$30,828	
1968-1	Ninfalo	5	Calvin Stone		Eugene Constantin Jr.	11/16	1:41.80	$24,764	
1968-2	Vale of Tears	5	Larry J. Durousseau	Albert Vizcaya	Mrs. Raymond Bauer	11/16	1:41.20	$24,764	
1967	Single Needle	4	Larry J. Durousseau	Walter R. Greenman	Richard D. & C. M. Baren	11/16	1:46.80	$30,772	
1966	Royal Gunner	4	Bill Hartack	Loyd Gentry Jr.	Mike Ford	11/16	1:43.00	$31,075	
