= Remington Springboard Mile Stakes =

Remington Springboard Mile
- Class: Listed
- Location: Remington Park; Oklahoma City, Oklahoma, United States
- Race type: Thoroughbred - Flat racing
- Website: www.remingtonpark.com

Race information
- Distance: 1 mile
- Surface: Dirt
- Track: left-handed
- Qualification: Two year old
- Weight: Colts and geldings: 121 lb (54.9 kg); Fillies 118 lb (53.5 kg)
- Purse: $400,000 (2021)
- Bonuses: Automatic nomination to Oklahoma Derby

The Remington Springboard Mile is a Listed American Thoroughbred horse race for two-year-olds over a distance of one mile on the dirt run annually in December at Remington Park located in Oklahoma City, Oklahoma. After peaking in 2019 with a purse of $400,000, the purse was reduced to $200,000 in 2020. As of 2021, the purse was increased back to $400,000 before being reduced again to $300,000 in 2023.

Prior to 2009, the race was known as the Remington MEC Mile Stakes. Formerly run on the last day of the racing calendar in December at Remington Park, it has since been moved to the Friday night going into the final weekend.

The event was added in 2017 as a qualification race for the Kentucky Derby and stake money had been increasing in the last few years before the COVID-19 pandemic.

== Historical race notes ==
Jockey Cliff Berry, who retired at the end of 2015 as the winningest jockey in the history of Remington Park, won his third Springboard/Mec Mile on December 11, 2010, aboard Grant Jack. The previous day at Remington Park he had won a record setting seven races from seven mounts.

== Records (2001-2019) ==
Speed record:

- 1:37.14 @ 1 mile (8 furlongs) - Greyvitos (2017)

Most wins by a jockey:

- 3 - Cliff Berry (2003, 2006, 2010)

Most wins by a trainer:

- 7 - Steven M. Asmussen (2002, 2004, 2005, 2014, 2018, 2019, 2023)

Most wins by an owner:

- No owner has won this race more than once

== Winners ==
Year	Winner	Jockey	Trainer	Owner	Dist. (Miles)	Time	Purse	Gr.
2025	Express Kid	Jose L. Alvarez	Wade Rarick	Steve Haahr	1 m	1:38.99	$300,000	L
2024	Coal Battle	Juan P. Vargas	Lonnie Briley	Norman Stables LLC	1 m	1:39.25	$300,000	L
2023	Otto the Conqueror	Tyler Gaffalione	Steven M. Asmussen	Three Chimneys Farm	1 m	1:39.91	$300,000	L
2022	Wildatlanticstorm	Leandro D. Goncalves	H. Ray Ashford Jr.	Jim Jorgensen	1 m	1:38.24	$400,000	L
2021	Make It Big	José Ortiz	Saffie Joeseph Jr.	Red Oak Stable	1 m	1:41.23	$400,000	L
2020	Senor Buscador	Luis S. Quinonez	Todd W. Fincher	Joe R. Peacock Jr.	1 m	1:37.87	$200,000	L
2019	Shoplifted	Ricardo Santana Jr.	Steven M. Asmussen	Grandview Equine, Cheyenne Stables & LNJ Foxwoods	1 m	1:37.95	$400,000	L
2018	Long Range Toddy	Richard Eramia	Steven M. Asmussen	Willis Horton Racing	1 m	1:39.75	$400,000	L
2017	Greyvitos	Victor Espinoza	Adam Kitchingman	Adam Kitchingman	1 m	1:37.14	$400,000	L
2016	Cool Arrow	Luis Saez	Joe Sharp	Brad & Misty Grady	1 m	1:38.72	$300,000	L
2015	Discreetness	Jon Court	William H. Fires	Xpress Thoroughbreds LLC	1 m	1:39.15	$250,000	L
2014	Bayerd	Ramon Vasquez	Steven M. Asmussen	Clark O. Brewster	1 m	1:37.26	$250,000	L
2013	Louies Flower	Luis S. Quinonez	W. Bret Calhoun	Wesley Welcher	1 m	1:38.83	$250,000	L
2012	Texas Bling	Erik McNeil	Danele Durham	Hall Family Trust	1 m	1:39.96	$250,000	L
2011	Ted's Folly	Jose Medina	Wilson L. Brown	Steve Martin	1 m	1:38.90	$250,000	L
2010	Grant Jack	Cliff Berry	W. Bret Calhoun	Wayne Sanders & Larry Hirsch	1 m	1:37.98	$250,000	L
2009	Turf Melody	Jeremy Rose	H. Graham Motion	Priscilla Graham	1 m	1:38.41	$200,000	L
Remington MEC Mile Stakes
2008	Kick On	Miguel Mena	Joseph S. Petalino	Baccari Racing Stable LLC (Chris Baccari)	1 m, 70 yds	1:42.90	$125,000	L
2007	Golden Yank	Carlos Gonzalez	Gary A. Thomas	Millard R. Seldin	1 m	1:38.40	$100,000	L
2006	Going Ballistic	Cliff Berry	Donnie K. Von Hemel	Michael R. & Mary A. Kindred	1 m	1:37.40	$100,000	L
2005	Test Boy	Quincy Hamilton	Steven M. Asmussen	Vinery Stables (Tom Simon)	1 m	1:38.26	$100,000	L
2004	Smooth Bid	Brian Hernandez Jr.	Steven M. Asmussen	Dakota Stables & Cash Asmussen	1 m	1:39.60	$75,000	L
2003	Depop	Cliff Berry	Joseph S. Petalino	Don S. Nutt	1 m	1:38.20	$75,000	L
2002	Shawklit Man	Donnie Meche	Steven M. Asmussen	Keith Asmussen & Oceanfront Property (George Strait)	1 m	1:39.20	$75,000	L
2001	It'sallinthechase	Donnie Meche	Wilson L. Brown	Darwin Olson	1 m	1:38.95	$75,000	L
