= Valley View Stakes =

- Class: Grade II
- Location: Keeneland Race Course; Lexington, Kentucky, United States
- Inaugurated: 1991
- Race type: Thoroughbred - Flat racing
- Sponsor: Bank of America (since 2023)
- Website: Keeneland

Race information
- Distance: 1 mile
- Surface: Turf
- Track: Left-handed
- Qualification: Three-year-old fillies
- Weight: 122 lbs. with allowances
- Purse: $300,000 (since 2022)

The Valley View Stakes is a Grade II American thoroughbred horse race for three-year-old fillies over a distance of 1 mile on the turf held annually in October at Keeneland Race Course in Lexington, Kentucky during the fall meeting.

== History ==
The event was named in after the Valley View Ferry which connects auto traffic between the county seats of Richmond in Madison County and Nicholasville in Jessamine County and is widely regarded as the Kentucky's oldest continually operating business.

The event was inaugurated on 11 October 1991 and was won by the 31-1 longshot La Gueriere in a time of 1:43.49. Two weeks later La Gueriere proved that her win was not a fluke by winning the Grade I Queen Elizabeth II Challenge Cup Stakes.

From 1994 to 1998 the event was classified as Listed and in 1999 the event was upgraded to Grade III.

The race was split into two divisions in 2009 and 2012.

In 2006 due to inclement weather the event was moved to the synthetic track and in 2015 also the event was moved off the turf to the dirt track.

In 2023 the distance of the event was decreased from 1 1/16 miles to one mile.

In 2024 the event was upgraded to Grade II by the Thoroughbred Owners and Breeders Association.

== Records ==
Speed record:

- 1:35.80 - Surge Capacity (2023)

Margins:

- 7 lengths – Mingling Glances (1997)

Most wins by an owner

- 3 - Augustin Stable (2010, 2012, 2022)

Most wins by a jockey

- 3 - Joe Bravo (1997, 2018, 2019)
- 3 - Pat Day (2000, 2003, 2004)

Most wins by a trainer

- 4 - H. Graham Motion (2015, 2016, 2018, 2022)

== Winners ==
Year	Winner	Jockey	Trainer	Owner	Distance	Time	Purse	Grade	Ref
2026	Sister Troienne	Luis Saez	Brian A. Lynch	Woodslane Racing	1 mile	1:37.18	$373,750	II	
2025	Admit	John R. Velazquez	Thomas Drury Jr.	Claiborne Farm	1 mile	1:35.17	$396,013	II	
2024	Poolside With Slim (IRE)	Frankie Dettori	George R. Arnold II	Glenn S. Bromagen II, Patrick Lewis & Sandra Bromagen	1 mile	1:36.00	$318,468	II	
2023	Surge Capacity	Joel Rosario	Chad C. Brown	Klaravich Stables	1 mile	1:35.80	$299,375	III	
2022	Sparkle Blue	Joel Rosario	H. Graham Motion	Augustin Stable & Catherine Parke	1 1/16 miles	1:42.42	$298,594	III	
2021	Navratilova	Colby Hernandez	George R. Arnold II	G. Watts Humphrey, Jr.	1 1/16 miles	1:43.57	$150,000	III	
2020	Stunning Sky	Ricardo Santana Jr.	Michael J. Maker	Paradise Farms Corp. & Parkland Thoroughbreds	1 1/16 miles	1:41.33	$150,000	III	
2019	Lady Prancealot (IRE)	Joe Bravo	Richard Baltas	Jules & Michael Iavarone & Jerry McClanahan	1 1/16 miles	1:43.25	$150,000	III	
2018	Colonia (FR)	Joe Bravo	H. Graham Motion	Michael Dubb, Madaket Stables, Maurice Lagasse, Haras d'Etreham & Bethlehem Stables	1 1/16 miles	1:45.98	$150,000	III	
2017	Lovely Bernadette	Florent Geroux	James P. DiVito	James M. Miller	1 1/16 miles	1:42.80	$150,000	III	
2016	Quidura (GB)	Junior Alvarado	H. Graham Motion	Gestut Fahrhof	1 1/16 miles	1:45.86	$150,000	III	
2015	Tiger Ride	Edgar S. Prado	H. Graham Motion	Dixiana Farms	1 1/16 miles	1:43.99	$150,000	III	Off turf
2014	Sparkling Review	Julien R. Leparoux	Ben Colebrook	Edward A. Seltzer & Beverly S. Anderson	1 1/16 miles	1:44.34	$150,000	III	
2013	Overheard	Eurico Rosa da Silva	Malcolm Pierce	Pin Oak Stable	1 1/16 miles	1:43.36	$150,000	III	
2012	Angel Terrace	James Graham	Jonathan E. Sheppard	Augustin Stable	1 1/16 miles	1:44.77	$125,000	III	Division 1
2012	Miz Ida	Shaun Bridgmohan	Steve Margolis	Richard Bertram and Elaine Klein	1 1/16 miles	1:44.25	$125,000	III	Division 2
2011	Daisy Devine	Calvin H. Borel	Andrew McKeever	James M. Miller	1 1/16 miles	1:43.30	$150,000	III	
2010	Fugitive Angel	Rosie Napravnik	Jonathan E. Sheppard	Augustin Stable	1 1/16 miles	1:44.10	$150,000	III	
2009	Single Solution	James Graham	Chris M. Block	Lothenbach Stables	1 1/16 miles	1:47.00	$125,000	III	Division 1
2009	Eye of Taurus	John R. Velazquez	Kiaran P. McLaughlin	Harvey A. Clarke	1 1/16 miles	1:46.49	$125,000	III	Division 2
2008	Acoma	Julien R. Leparoux	David M. Carroll	Helen C. Alexander & Helen K. Groves	1 1/16 miles	1:43.60	$150,000	III	
2007	Bel Air Beauty	Mark Guidry	Frank L. Brothers	Bruce Lunsford	1 1/16 miles	1:44.39	$150,000	III	
2006	Meribel	Garrett K. Gomez	Christophe Clement	Arthur B. Hancock III & Catesby W. Clay	1 1/16 miles	1:42.95	$125,000	III	Off turf
2005	Asi Siempre	Gary L. Stevens	Patrick L. Biancone	Martin S. Schwartz	1 1/16 miles	1:45.37	$125,000	III	
2004	Sister Swank	Pat Day	Steven M. Asmussen	Heiligbrodt Racing Stable	1 1/16 miles	1:46.75	$116,300	III	
2003	Dyna Da Wyna	Pat Day	W. Elliott Walden	WinStar Farm	1 1/16 miles	1:43.54	$112,900	III	
2002	Bedanken	Donald R. Pettinger	Donnie K. Von Hemel	Pin Oak Stable	1 1/16 miles	1:44.24	$114,700	III	
2001	Cozzy Corner	Lonnie Meche	Patrick J. Kelly	Fox Ridge Farm	1 1/16 miles	1:42.93	$113,600	III	Dead heat
2001	Chausson Poire	Russell W. Woolsey	Duane Knipe	Pia M. Kirkham	1 1/16 miles	1:42.93	$113,600	III	Dead heat
2000	Good Game	Pat Day	Neil J. Howard	William S. Farish III & Edward J. Hudson Jr.	1 1/16 miles	1:45.69	$114,800	III	
1999	Gimmeakissee	Patricia Cooksey	Robert W. Leonard	Hurst Leigh Stable	1 1/16 miles	1:42.05	$113,100	III	
1998	White Beauty	Calvin H. Borel	Terry J. Brennan	Greg Rand	1 1/16 miles	1:43.09	$84,525	Listed	
1997	Mingling Glances	Joe Bravo	Burk Kessinger Jr.	Alvin D. Haynes, Bruce Barton & Turf Stable	1 1/16 miles	1:44.51	$84,825	Listed	
1996	Turkappeal	Donna M. Barton	Todd A. Pletcher	Betty G. Massey & Jake J. Pletcher	1 1/16 miles	1:46.10	$84,075	Listed	
1995	Country Cat	Donna M. Barton	D. Wayne Lukas	Overbrook Farm	1 1/16 miles	1:44.88	$82,500	Listed	
1994	Pharma	Chris Antley	Alex L. Hassinger Jr.	Allen E. Paulson	1 1/16 miles	1:42.48	$81,850	Listed	
1993	Weekend Madness (IRE)	Charles R. Woods Jr.	Burk Kessinger Jr.	New Phenoix Stable	1 1/16 miles	1:43.06	$41,650		
1992	§ Spinning Round	Fabio A. Arguello Jr.	James E. Baker	Kinsman Stable	1 1/16 miles	1:41.51	$39,900		
1991	La Gueriere	Brian Dale Peck	A. Peter Perkins	Wimborne Farms	1 1/16 miles	1:43.49	$44,650		

Legend:
All Weather Track Dirt Turf
Notes:
§ Ran as an entry

== See also ==
- List of American and Canadian Graded races
