= Essex Handicap =

- Class: Grade III
- Location: Oaklawn Park Race Track; Hot Springs, Arkansas, United States
- Inaugurated: 1948 (as Southland Handicap)
- Race type: Thoroughbred - Flat racing
- Website: Oaklawn Park

Race information
- Distance: 1 1/16 miles
- Surface: Dirt
- Track: left-handed
- Qualification: Four years old and older
- Weight: Assigned
- Purse: $500,000 (since 2025)

The Essex Handicap is a Grade III American Thoroughbred horse race for four-year-olds and older at a distance of one and one-sixteenth miles on the dirt run annually in March at Oaklawn Park Race Track in Hot Springs, Arkansas. The event currently offers a purse of $500,000.

== History ==
=== Southland Handicap ===
The event was inaugurated on 13 March 1948 as the Southland Handicap a $5,000 handicap event for three-year-olds and older and was won by William H. Bishop owner and trained six-year-old Boden's Pal in a time 1:43 4/5. William H. Bishop was from Anna, Illinois where prior to World War II he ran a Horse & Mule Auction and then later become a leading horse trainer in Illinois.

Illinois horsemen had an impact on the early runnings of the event. The 1949 running was won by Jean Denemark's entry of three-year-old Provocative and Enforcer in a small four horse field. Members from the Denemark's family would win the event five times in the first 13 runnings including Racetracker who won the event twice. From Lisle, Illinois, her husband, Emil Denemark, was an established horse breeder who died in 1963.

Another horse in this era to make an impact was the dual winner Little Imp who won in 1953 and 1955. The son of the 1943 Arkansas Derby winner Seven Hearts also finished second in 1952 and third in 1954. In 1954 the distance of the event was decreased to 1 mile and 70 yards.

In 1956 the event was scheduled to be run on Saturday, March 17 but it was not held. In 1957 the winner Sir Tribal set a new track record for the 1 mile and 70 yards distance in 1:40 flat. The event had become a preparatory race for the Oaklawn Handicap, the premier event for old horses which would be held usually one two weeks following the Southland Handicap. Although the distance of the event was shortened to six furlongs only for the 1960 running, the winner Little Fitz would be the first horse to win the Southland–Oaklawn Handicap double in the same year although there had been earlier placegetters of the event who did win the Oaklawn Handicap.

In 1966 the event was won by 1965 Arkansas Derby winner Swift Ruler who set a new track record for the 1 mile and 70 yards distance in 1:39 2/5. Swift Ruler would go on and win a unique treble by winning the Razorback Handicap and then the Oaklawn Handicap.

In 1972 the winner of the event, Sado carried 125 lbs, the highest weight by a winner. Sado became the third horse to win the event for the second time as the 6/5 favorite winning by a half length margin in a field of nine.

=== Essex Handicap ===
In 1973 the Oaklawn Park administration renamed the event to the Essex Handicap in honor of the former racetrack Essex Park which was also located in Hot Springs, Arkansas and was destroyed by fire in the early 20th century. In 1976 the conditions of the event were changed that three-year-old could not be entered since there were new events available specifically for them.

In 1985 the event was upgraded to a Grade III by the American Graded Stakes Committee. In 1987 the distance of the event was increased by forty yards to one and one-sixteenth miles. Sun Master, winner of the event at the new distance at 1:41 flat continues to hold the stakes record to date. In 1992 the event was scheduled for the first time February.

After twenty-three runnings of the event as Grade III the event lost its graded status for the 2008 running.

With increased revenue from the racino the administration of the track in 2017 began increasing the purse offered for the event. In 2017 the event offered $250,000 and by 2021 an attractive purse of $500,000 was up for grabs. This increase in stakes started to attract much more accomplished gallopers and the American Graded Stakes Committee restored the event back to Grade III for 2022.

== Records ==
Speed record:

- 1 1/8 miles: 1:48.82 – Skippylongstocking (2026)
- 1 1/16 miles: 1:41.00 – Sun Master (1987)
- 1 miles & 70 yards: 1:39.40 – Swift Ruler (1966)

Margins:

- 7 lengths – Silver Goblin (1995)

Most wins:

- 2 – Little Imp (1953, 1955)
- 2 – Racetracker (1958, 1959)
- 2 – Sado (1971, 1972)
- 2 – Rated R Superstar (2019, 2022)

Most wins by an owner:

- 5 – Denemark Family (1949, 1952, 1958, 1959, 1961)

Most wins by a jockey:

- 3 – Garth Patterson (1977, 1979, 1981)
- 3 – Pat Day (1991, 1992, 1993)
- 3 – Calvin H. Borel (1998, 2007, 2011)
- 3 – Luis S. Quinonez (2000, 2003, 2012)
- 3 – Ricardo Santana Jr. (2014, 2013, 2021)

Most wins by a trainer:

- 3 – D. Wayne Lukas (1987, 1991, 2023)
- 3 – Steven M. Asmussen (2004, 2021, 2025)

Southland / Essex Handicap – Oaklawn Handicap double:

- Little Fitz (1960), Wa-Wa Cy (1963), Gay Revoke (1965), Swift Ruler (1966), Warbucks (1975), Silver State (2021)

== Winners ==
Year	Winner	Age	Jockey	Trainer	Owner	Distance	Time	Purse	Grade	Ref
Essex Handicap
2026	Skippylongstocking	7	Micah J. Husbands	Saffie A. Joseph Jr.	Daniel Alonso	1 1/8 miles	1:48.82	$500,000	III	
2025	Red Route One	5	Keith Asmussen	Steven M. Asmussen	Winchell Thoroughbreds	1 1/8 miles	1:51.67	$500,000	III	
2024	First Mission	4	Florent Geroux	Brad H. Cox	Godolphin Racing	1 1/8 miles	1:49.76	$600,000	III	
2023	Last Samurai	5	Cristian Torres	D. Wayne Lukas	Willis Horton Racing	1 1/16 miles	1:43.17	$500,000	III	
2022	Rated R Superstar	9	David Cabrera	Federico Villafranco	Danny R. Caldwell	1 1/16 miles	1:43.12	$500,000	III	
2021	Silver State	4	Ricardo Santana Jr.	Steven M. Asmussen	Winchell Thoroughbreds & Willis Horton Racing	1 1/16 miles	1:42.73	$500,000	Listed	
2020	Night Ops	4	Joseph Talamo	Brad H. Cox	Steve Landers Racing	1 1/16 miles	1:44.09	$350,000	Listed	
2019	Rated R Superstar	6	Walter De La Cruz	Cipriano Contreras	Crystal Racing Enterprises & Contreras Stable	1 1/16 miles	1:42.66	$350,000	Listed	
2018	Hedge Fund	4	Jose L. Ortiz	Todd A. Pletcher	WinStar Farm, China Horse Club, SF Racing & Head of Plains Partners	1 1/16 miles	1:42.06	$300,000	Listed	
2017	Mor Spirit	4	Mike E. Smith	Bob Baffert	Michael Lund Petersen	1 1/16 miles	1:41.62	$250,000	Listed	
2016	La Macchina	4	Channing Hill	Otabek Umarov	O'zbekiston Racing	1 1/16 miles	1:45.27	$100,000	Listed	
2015	Golden Lad	5	Ricardo Santana Jr.	Todd A. Pletcher	E. Paul Robsham Stables	1 1/16 miles	1:44.05	$100,000	Listed	
2014	Right to Vote	5	Ricardo Santana Jr.	Ron Moquett	B J D Thoroughbreds	1 1/16 miles	1:44.84	$100,000	Listed	
2013	Donoharm	4	M. Clifton Berry	W. Bret Calhoun	Wayne Sanders & Larry Hirsch	1 1/16 miles	1:44.71	$98,000	Listed	
2012	Alternation	4	Luis S. Quinonez	Donnie K. Von Hemel	Pin Oak Stable	1 1/16 miles	1:44.95	$100,000	Listed	
2011	Kate's Main Man	6	Calvin H. Borel	Randy L. Morse	Randy Patterson	1 1/16 miles	1:45.12	$100,000	Listed	
2010	Racing Bran	5	Christopher A. Emigh	Scott Becker	William P. Stiritz	1 1/16 miles	1:46.13	$100,000	Listed	
2009	Prom Shoes	5	Christopher A. Emigh	William H. Fires	Patricia B. Blass	1 1/16 miles	1:44.21	$100,000	Listed	
2008	Spotsgone	5	Joe M. Johnson	William H. Fires	Robert Yagos	1 1/16 miles	1:43.72	$100,000	Listed	
2007	Jonesboro	5	Calvin H. Borel	Randy L. Morse	Michael Langford	1 1/16 miles	1:44.20	$100,000	III	
2006	Rockport Harbor	4	Stewart Elliott	John C. Servis	Fox Hill Farms	1 1/16 miles	1:47.68	$100,000	III	
2005	Absent Friend	5	Roman Chapa	Cole Norman	H & H Ranch	1 1/16 miles	1:43.66	$100,000	III	
2004	Private Emblem	5	Timothy T. Doocy	Steven M. Asmussen	James Cassels & Bob Zollars	1 1/16 miles	1:43.66	$100,000	III	
2003	Colorful Tour	4	Luis S. Quinonez	P. Noel Hickey	Irish Acres Farm	1 1/16 miles	1:46.22	$100,000	III	
2002	Crafty Shaw	4	James Lopez	Peter M. Vestal	Lucky Seven Stable	1 1/16 miles	1:43.14	$75,000	III	
2001	Mr Ross	6	Donald R. Pettinger	Donnie K. Von Hemel	Don C. McNeill	1 1/16 miles	1:43.59	$75,000	III	
2000	Maysville Slew	4	Luis S. Quinonez	C. R. Trout	Robert L. Sanford	1 1/16 miles	1:44.12	$75,000	III	
1999	Brush With Pride	7	Timothy T. Doocy	Steve Hobby	Barbara R. & John E. Smicklas	1 1/16 miles	1:43.26	$75,000	III	
1998	Relic Reward	4	Calvin H. Borel	Cecil P. Borel	Janelle Grum	1 1/16 miles	1:43.92	$75,000	III	
1997	No Spend No Glow	5	Robert Neal Lester	Don Von Hemel Sr.	Edward J. Dullea	1 1/16 miles	1:45.94	$75,000	III	
1996	Classic Fit	6	Carlos Gonzalez	P. Noel Hickey	Irish Acres Farm	1 1/16 miles	1:42.98	$76,320	III	
1995	Silver Goblin	4	Dale W. Cordova	Kenny P. Smith	Al J. Horton	1 1/16 miles	1:42.10	$55,250	III	
1994	Greatsilverfleet	4	Garrett K. Gomez	Dale Capuano	G S F Racing	1 1/16 miles	1:42.08	$53,750	III	
1993	Delafield	4	Pat Day	Peter M. Vestal	December Hill Farm	1 1/16 miles	1:42.11	$56,500	III	
1992	Allijeba	6	Pat Day	Larry Robideaux Jr.	Robert Allensworth	1 1/16 miles	1:43.95	$57,500	III	
1991	Greydar	4	Pat Day	D. Wayne Lukas	Calumet Farm	1 1/16 miles	1:42.08	$57,950	III	
1990	Forli Light	4	David Guillory	Larry Robideaux Jr.	David Beard	1 1/16 miles	1:42.80	$61,550	III	
1989	Proper Reality	4	Jerry D. Bailey	Robert E. Holthus	Mrs. James A. Winn	1 1/16 miles	1:44.00	$57,550	III	
1988	Savings	5	Patrick A. Johnson	Gary G. Hartlage	Diana Stable	1 1/16 miles	1:42.60	$74,300	III	
1987	Sun Master	4	Ricky Frazier	D. Wayne Lukas	Jeff & D. Wayne Lukas	1 1/16 miles	1:41.00	$61,250	III	
1986	Double Ready	6	David E. Whited	Randy C. Reed	R. B. Oliver	1 mile & 70 yards	1:41.60	$87,700	III	
1985	Star Choice	6	James McKnight	Carl A. Nafzger	Frances A. Genter Stable	1 mile & 70 yards	1:40.60	$84,600	III	
1984	Le Cou Cou	4	Donald Lee Howard	James G. Arnett	Duane B. Clark	1 mile & 70 yards	1:41.80	$60,800		
1983	§ Eminency	5	William Nemeti	Joseph B. Cantey	Happy Valley Farm	1 mile & 70 yards	1:42.40	$64,450		
1982	Plaza Star	4	Randy Romero	Ronald Ochs	Robert DeWitt	1 mile & 70 yards	1:42.80	$63,200		
1981	Prince Majestic	7	Garth Patterson	Dewey Smith	Mrs. Joe W. Brown	1 mile & 70 yards	1:42.40	$57,500		
1980	J. Burns	5	James McKnight	J. Bert Sonnier	Jer Ed Farms	1 mile & 70 yards	1:42.80	$58,700		
1979	Cisk	5	Garth Patterson	Glenn L. Hild	Mrs. Carolyn Manning	1 mile & 70 yards	1:42.40	$60,250		
1978	Mark's Place	6	Raul Ramirez	Joseph B. Cantey	Robert D. Bird	1 mile & 70 yards	1:41.60	$60,950		
1977	§ Go to the Bank	5	Garth Patterson	Paul T. Adwell	Jer Ed Farms	1 mile & 70 yards	1:42.40	$64,200		
1976	Navajo	6	James D. Nichols	James O. Keefer	Joseph Stevenson & Raymond Stump	1 mile & 70 yards	1:41.00	$58,250		
1975	Warbucks	5	Danny Gargan	Donald Combs	Edwin E. Elzenmeyer	1 mile & 70 yards	1:40.80	$50,000		
1974	Crimson Falcon	4	David E. Whited	Peter W. Salmen	Crimson King Farms	1 mile & 70 yards	1:41.60	$50,000		
1973	Hustlin Greek	4	John L. Lively	James E. O'Bryant	Kay O'Bryant & Mary Belts	1 mile & 70 yards	1:41.00	$30,000		
Southland Handicap
1972	Sado	5	Donald Brumfield	Harold Tinker	W. Cal Partee	1 mile & 70 yards	1:41.20	$25,000		
1971	Sado	4	Donald Brumfield	Harold Tinker	W. Cal Partee	1 mile & 70 yards	1:41.80	$25,000		
1970	Spud	4	Eddie Arroyo	James M. Levitch	J. M. Levitch, J. H. Gibson & S. L. Fentress	1 mile & 70 yards	1:42.20	$20,000		
1969	Tenor	6	Roberto M. Gonzalez	L. H. Grimes	L. H. Grimes	1 mile & 70 yards	1:44.80	$15,000		
1968	Slade	5	Robert F. Mundrof	Lonnie Abshire	Stanley Conrad	1 mile & 70 yards	1:44.60	$12,500		
1967	Dominar	4	Robert Nono	L. G. Brandy Culver	John D. Askew	1 mile & 70 yards	1:40.20	$12,500		
1966	Swift Ruler	4	Larry R. Spraker	Gin L. Collins	Earl Allen	1 mile & 70 yards	1:39.40	$10,000		
1965	Gay Revoke	7	Calvin Stone	Gomer A. Evans Sr.	Gomer A. Evans Sr.	1 mile & 70 yards	1:46.20	$10,000		
1964	Rob Roy III (ARG)	7	Eldon Coffman	Doug Carver Sr.	Doug Carver Sr.	1 mile & 70 yards	1:41.80	$10,000		
1963	Wa-Wa Cy	4	Earl Van Hook	Joseph E. Bilbrey	Mrs. I. W. Spicer	1 mile & 70 yards	1:41.00	$10,000		
1962	Interlocutor	4	Kenneth Griffith	Steve Ippolito	Jacnot Stable	1 mile & 70 yards	1:42.40	$10,000		
1961	Mangam	6	Anthony Skoronski	W. Roland	Jean Denemark	1 mile & 70 yards	1:39.60	$10,000		
1960	Little Fitz	5	William A. Peake	Robert C. Steele	John C. Hauer	6 furlongs	1:11.20	$10,000		
1959	§ Racetracker	6	Howard Craig	George Alexandra	Jean Denemark	1 mile & 70 yards	1:40.80	$6,500		
1958	Racetracker	5	Howard Craig	George Alexandra	Jean Denemark	1 mile & 70 yards	1:42.00	$5,000		
1957	Sir Tribal	6	Anthony Skoronski	Steve Ippolito	Charles Fritz	1 mile & 70 yards	1:40.00	$5,000		
1956	Race not held									
1955	Little Imp	8	Job Dean Jessop	Rudy Tryon	Charles H. Everitt	1 mile & 70 yards	1:41.00	$5,000		
1954	Caldwell	7	Raymond Williams	Tater Whatley	Olen Sledge	1 mile & 70 yards	1:41.20	$5,000		
1953	Little Imp	6	Peter Ward	Rudy Tryon	Charles H. Everitt	1 1/16 miles	1:48.40	$5,000		
1952	Robert	3	John Heckman	Robert V. McGarvey	Emil Denemark Jr.	1 1/16 miles	1:42.80	$5,000		
1951	Fleet Factor	4	Lois C. Cook	E. E. Manor Jr.	Raymond Wilkinson	1 1/16 miles	1:45.60	$5,000		
1950	Fancy Flyer	5	Harold Keene	Jack Grills	Carl Graham	1 1/16 miles	1:45.60	$5,000		
1949	§ Provocative	3	Lois C. Cook	Robert V. McGarvey	Jean Denemark	1 1/16 miles	1:43.80	$5,000		
1948	Boden's Pal	6	Harold Keene	William H. Bishop	William H. Bishop	1 1/16 miles	1:43.80	$5,000		

Notes:
§ Ran as an entry

== See also ==
- List of American and Canadian Graded races

== External sites ==
Oaklawn Park Media Guide 2020
