= Niall M. O'Callaghan =

Irish-born American horse trainer

Niall O'Callaghan
Personal information
- Born: May 21, 1963 (age 63) County Cork, Ireland
- Occupation: Trainer

Horse racing career
- Sport: Horse racing
- Career wins: 531

Major racing wins
- Pan American Handicap (1992); Jersey Derby (1992); Bowling Green Handicap (1992); Oklahoma Derby (1994); Laurance Armour Handicap (1995); Bernard Baruch Handicap (1996); Arlington Oaks (1997); First Lady Stakes (1998); Just A Game Handicap (1998); Coaching Club American Oaks (1999); Cornhusker Handicap (1999); Lecomte Stakes (2000); Maple Leaf Stakes (2000); Seagram Cup Stakes (2000); Kentucky Cup Classic Stakes (2001); San Antonio Handicap (2001); Stephen Foster Handicap (2001); Washington Park Handicap (2001); Black-Eyed Susan Stakes (2002); Hawthorne Gold Cup Handicap (2002); Lone Star Derby (2002); West Virginia Derby (2002); Mac Diarmida Handicap (2003); West Virginia Governor's Stakes (2003); Royal North Stakes (2005); Kentucky Cup Turf Stakes (2006)

Significant horses
- Wall Street Dancer, Witchful Thinking

Niall M. O'Callaghan (born May 21, 1963, in County Cork, Ireland) is an American Thoroughbred horse trainer.

O'Callaghan became involved in the sport of Thoroughbred horse racing as an apprentice jockey in his native Ireland. In 1982 he emigrated to the United States where he studied at Miami Dade Community College in Florida. In 1988, he went to work as an assistant to trainer Thomas J. Skiffington, Jr. In 1990, O'Callaghan set up his own public stable, handling fifteen horses from prominent owner, Frank Stronach. With John Gunther's colt, Wall Street Dancer, O'Callaghan won his first Graded stakes race, the 1992 Pan American Handicap at Gulfstream Park Racetrack.
