= She's a Julie =

American thoroughbred racehorse

- Breed: Thoroughbred
- Sire: Elusive Quality
- Grandsire: Gone West
- Dam: Kydd Gloves
- Damsire: Dubai Millennium
- Sex: Filly
- Foaled: 2015
- Country: USA
- Color: Bay
- Breeder: Godolphin
- Owner: Whispering Oaks Farm Team Hanley, Tim & Anna Cambron, Bradley Thoroughbreds, Madaket Stables
- Trainer: Steve Asmussen
- Record: 19:7-2-4
- Earnings: $1,187,880

Major wins
- Iowa Oaks (2018); Remington Park Oaks (2018); Bayakoa Stakes (2019); La Troienne Stakes (2019); Ogden Phipps Stakes (2020)

She's a Julie (foaled April 27, 2015, in Kentucky) is an American Thoroughbred racehorse and the winner of the 2019 La Troienne Stakes.

== Career ==
She's a Julie's first race was on May 26, 2017, at Churchill Downs, where she came in first.

Her next win did not come until June 2, 2018, when she won at Churchill Downs.

She then won the Iowa Oaks on July 5, 2018, and placed 2nd the month after in the 2018 Alabama Stakes.

She started off the 2019 season by winning the Bayakoa Handicap and then on May 3, 2019, she captured the 2019 La Troienne Stakes.

== Pedigree ==
Pedigree of She's a Julie (USA), 2015
Sire Elusive Quality (USA) 1993	Gone West (USA); 1984	Mr. Prospector	Raise a Native
Sire Elusive Quality (USA) 1993	Gone West (USA); 1984	Mr. Prospector	Gold Digger
Sire Elusive Quality (USA) 1993	Gone West (USA); 1984	Secrettame	Secretariat
Sire Elusive Quality (USA) 1993	Gone West (USA); 1984	Secrettame	Tamerett
Sire Elusive Quality (USA) 1993	Touch of Greatness (USA); 1986	Hero's Honor	Northern Dancer
Sire Elusive Quality (USA) 1993	Touch of Greatness (USA); 1986	Hero's Honor	Glowing Tribute
Sire Elusive Quality (USA) 1993	Touch of Greatness (USA); 1986	Ivory Wand	Sir Ivor
Sire Elusive Quality (USA) 1993	Touch of Greatness (USA); 1986	Ivory Wand	Natashka
Dam Kydd Gloves (USA) 2002	Dubai Millennium (GB); 1996	Seeking The Gold	Mr. Prospector
Dam Kydd Gloves (USA) 2002	Dubai Millennium (GB); 1996	Seeking The Gold	Con Game
Dam Kydd Gloves (USA) 2002	Dubai Millennium (GB); 1996	Colorado Dancer	Shareef Dancer
Dam Kydd Gloves (USA) 2002	Dubai Millennium (GB); 1996	Colorado Dancer	Fall Aspen
Dam Kydd Gloves (USA) 2002	Parade Queen (USA); 1994	A.P. Indy	Seattle Slew
Dam Kydd Gloves (USA) 2002	Parade Queen (USA); 1994	A.P. Indy	Weekend Surprise
Dam Kydd Gloves (USA) 2002	Parade Queen (USA); 1994	Spanish Parade	Roberto
Dam Kydd Gloves (USA) 2002	Parade Queen (USA); 1994	Spanish Parade	Nijit
