= Bayakoa Stakes =

Bayakoa Stakes may refer to:

- Bayakoa Stakes (Los Alamitos), a thoroughbred horse race at Los Alamitos Race Course in California
- Bayakoa Stakes (Oaklawn Park), a thoroughbred horse race at Oaklawn Park in Hot Springs, Arkansas
