= Cliff Berry =

American jockey

Personal information
- Born: August 23, 1962 (age 63) Joplin, Missouri, United States
- Occupation: Jockey

Horse racing career
- Sport: Horse racing
- Career wins: 4,457

Major racing wins
- Ouija Board Handicap (2001, 2010); Springboard Mile (2003, 2006, 2010); Dallas Turf Cup (2004); Oklahoma Derby (2003, 2006, 2015); Silverbulletday Stakes (2006); Super Derby (2007); Instant Racing Stakes (2008); Bayakoa Stakes (2009); Matron Stakes (2009); Rebel Stakes (2009); Steve Sexton Mile Stakes (2009); Texas Mile (2009); Oaklawn Handicap (2011)

Racing awards
- Leading Rider at Oaklawn Park (2011,2012)

Honors
- Oklahoma Horse Racing Hall of Fame (2008); Lone Star Park Hall of Fame (2017)

Monty Clifton Berry (born August 23, 1962, in Joplin, Missouri) is an American retired jockey who successfully competed in American Quarter Horse racing and in Thoroughbred racing. On Dec. 10, 2010, he became one of only four jockeys in U.S. racing history to win seven races on a single racecard and in his case it was all the races run. He retired at the end of 2015 as the winningest jockey in the history of Remington Park and Lone Star Park.
