= Anthony Skoronski =

American jockey (1920–1992)

Tony Skoronski
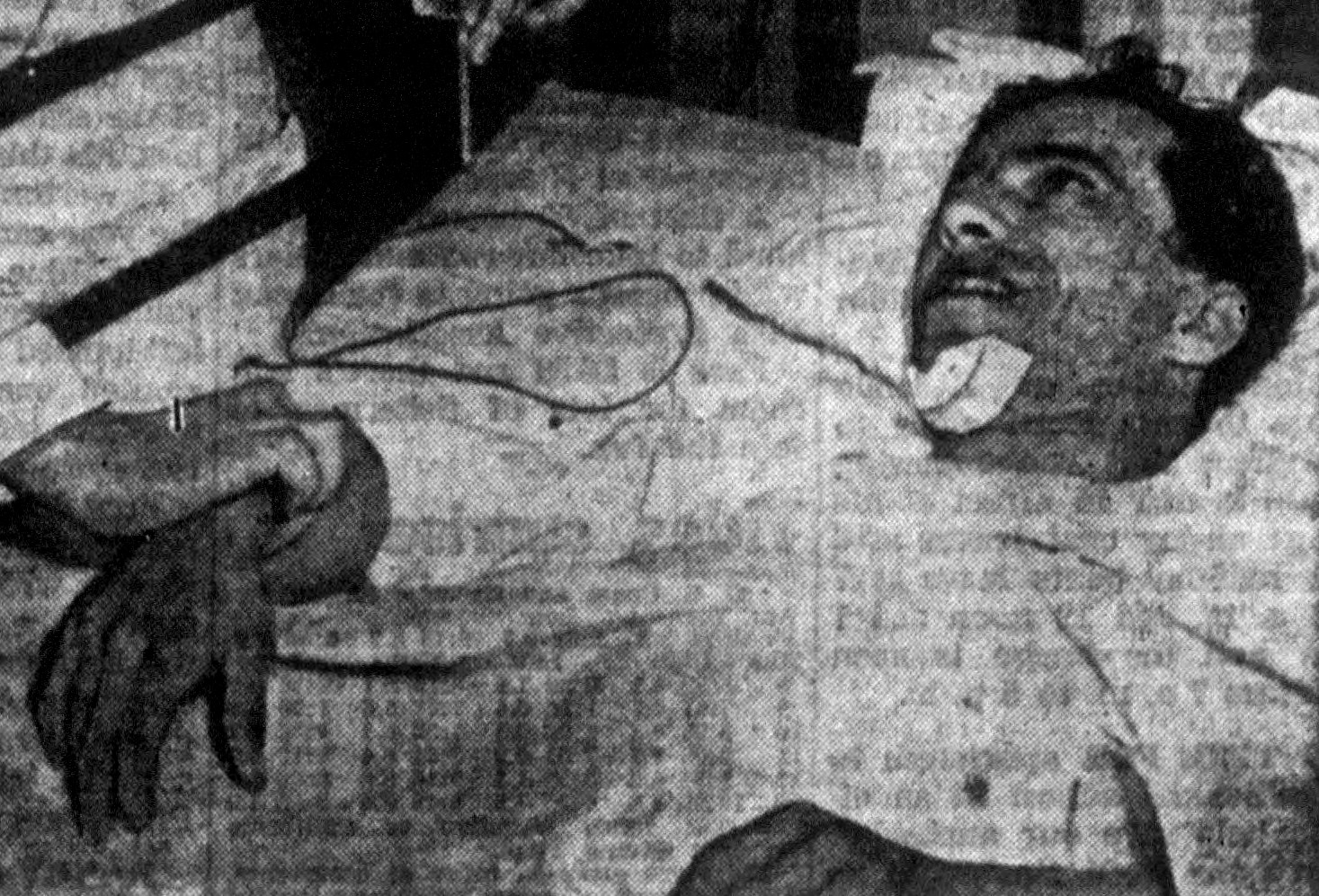
- Skoronski in May 1953

Personal information
- Born: May 23, 1920 United States
- Died: September 5, 1992 (aged 72)
- Occupation: Jockey

Horse racing career
- Sport: Horse racing
- Career wins: Not found

Major racing wins
- Arkansas Derby (1944); Phoenix Handicap (1944); Hollywood Gold Cup (1945); San Carlos Handicap (1948); Spinaway Stakes (1948); Washington Park Futurity (1948); Oaklawn Handicap (1951); Essex Handicap (1957, 1961); Pucker Up Stakes (1961)

Honours
- Chicagoland Sports Hall of Fame

Significant horses
- Challenge Me

Anthony S. Skoronski (May 23, 1920 – September 5, 1992) was an American jockey in Thoroughbred horse racing. For more than a quarter of a century until retiring in 1969, he rode primarily at racetracks in the Chicago, Illinois area and at Oaklawn Park Race Track in Hot Springs, Arkansas. During his career he won the riding title eight times at Chicago's Sportsman's Park and two at Oaklawn Park.

Skoronski's most important Graded stakes race wins came aboard Challenge Me, a colt he rode to victory in the 1944 Arkansas Derby and the 1945 Hollywood Gold Cup.

In 1992 Tony Skoronski was living in Cicero, Illinois when he suffered a heart attack while at the local racetrack and was pronounced dead on arrival at hospital. His career was honored with induction in the Chicagoland Sports Hall of Fame.
