= Round Table Stakes =

- Class: Discontinued stakes
- Location: Arlington Park, Arlington Heights, Illinois, United States
- Inaugurated: 1961
- Race type: Thoroughbred – Flat racing

Race information
- Distance: 1 1/8 miles (9 furlongs)
- Surface: Dirt
- Track: left-handed
- Qualification: Three-year-olds
- Purse: $100,000

The Round Table Stakes was an American Thoroughbred horse race run on dirt and on turf forty-four times between 1961 and 2007. First run at Washington Park Race Track in Homewood, Illinois as the Round Table Handicap, in 1963 it was moved to Arlington Park racetrack in Arlington Heights. In 1985 a fire destroyed the track's grandstand and clubhouse and its races were hosted that year by Chicago's Hawthorne Race Course. A stakes race open to three-year-old horses, it was last contested on Polytrack synthetic dirt over a distance of one and one-eighth miles. From inception through 1968, it was a handicap race for horses age three and older.

The race was named for Round Table, the 1958 American Horse of the Year and U.S. Racing Hall of Fame inductee. Round Table retired with earnings of $1,749,869, the most for any horse in world Thoroughbred racing history. Kerr Stable's win with Rambler II in the 1964 edition of the Round Table Handicap was particularly special for stable owner Travis Kerr who was the owner of Round Table.

The Round Table was run in two divisions in 1974, 1975 and 1983. It was not run in 1988, 1998 and 1999.

Notable past winners include John Henry who won his first graded stakes in impressive style with a twelve-length margin of victory in the September 16, 1978 Round Table Handicap.

In its last running in 2007, the colt Pavarotti set a track record in winning the 2007 edition of the Round Table Stakes. The race was slated to be run in 2008 but was placed on hiatus and dropped from the 2009 schedule.

== Track ==
=== Surface ===
- Turf (31) : 1961–1972, 1974–1987, 1989–1993 (31)
- Dirt (13) : 1973, 1994–1997, 2000–2006 (12)
- Polytrack (1) : 2007 (1)

=== Distances ===
- 1 mile (2) : 1973, 1974
- 1 1/16 miles (14) : 1961–1962, 1964–1966, 1968–1972, 1975–1978
- 1 1/8 miles (24) : 1963, 1967, 1979–1984, 1986–1987, 1992–1997, 2000–2007
- 1 3/16 miles (4) : 1985, 1989–1991

== Records ==
Speed record:

- 1:42 flat @ 1 1/16 miles on turf: Rambler II (1964)
- 1:47.40 @ 1 1/8 miles on turf: World Class Splash (1992)
- 1:47.73 @1 1/8 miles on dirt: Devilment 1:47.73 (2005)

Most wins by a jockey:

- 2 – Herberto Hinojosa (1963, 1964)
- 2 – Earlie Fires (1966, 1984)
- 2 – Pat Day (1980, 1982)
- 2 – Don Brumfield (1983, 1985)
- 2 – Don Pettinger (1996, 2004)

Most wins by a trainer:

- 2 – Harry Trotsek (1962, 1974)
- 2 – MacKenzie Miller (1967, 1969)
- 2 – Robin Frank (1981, 1983)
- 2 – Steven Penrod (1982, 1990)
- 2 – Richard J. Lundy (1989, 1991)
- 2 – Donnie K. Von Hemel (1996, 2004)

Most wins by an owner:

- 2 – Hasty House Farm (1962, 1974)
- 2 – Cragwood Stables (1967, 1969)
- 2 – Ogden Phipps (1970, 1976)
- 2 – Pin Oak Stable (2004, 2005)

== Winners ==
Year	Winner	Age	Jockey	Trainer	Owner	Dist. (Miles)	Time	Gr.
2007	Pavarotti	3	René Douglas	Todd Pletcher	Sue Magnier, Michael Tabor, Derrick Smith	1 1/8 m	1:49.75	
2006	Casino Evil	3	Francisco Torres	Michael A. Tomlinson	Haps Stable (Paul Hanifl & Vince Foglia)	1 1/8 m	1:50.12	
2005	Devilment	3	Carlos H. Marquez Jr.	Michael Stidham	Pin Oak Stable	1 1/8 m	1:47.73	
2004	Cryptograph	3	Don Pettinger	Donnie K. Von Hemel	Pin Oak Stable	1 1/8 m	1:51.53	
2003	Wiggins	3	Eusebio Razo Jr.	Anthony Granitz	William Pacella, Joseph Rizza, Ronald Schwed	1 1/8 m	1:50.47	
2002	Cowboy Stuff	3	Pat Valenzuela	Don Von Hemel Sr.	Shelley Bates & Don Von Hemel Sr.	1 1/8 m	1:48.98	
2001	Discreet Hero	3	Shane Laviolette	Albert Stall Jr.	B. Wayne Hughes	1 1/8 m	1:49.72	G3
2000	Fan The Flame	3	Eddie Martin Jr.	Randy L. Morse	Michael Langford	1 1/8 m	1:50.08	G3
1998	– 1999	Race not held						
1997	Rojo Dinero	3	Mark Guidry	Kelly Von Hemel	Steven D. Caldwell	1 1/8 m	1:51.90	G3
1996	Slew O' Mink	3	Don Pettinger	Donnie K. Von Hemel	Bad Boy Racing Ltd.	1 1/8 m	1:51.51	G3
1995	Kingdom City	3	Craig Perret	W. Elliott Walden	Jeffrey S. Sullivan & John L. Wieczorek	1 1/8 m	1:50.38	G3
1994	Danville	3	Larry Melancon	William G. Huffman	Top of the Key Stable (Gary Lavin & partners)	1 1/8 m	1:51.07	G3
1993	Snake Eyes	3	Wigberto Ramos	Steven L. Morguelan	Melvin Isenstein	1 1/8 m	1:49.80	G3
1992	World Class Splash	3	Garrett Gomez	P. Noel Hickey	Richard E. Trebat	1 1/8 m	1:47.40	G3
1991	Fraise	3	Robbie Davis	Richard J. Lundy	Madeleine Paulson	1 3/16 m	1:56.25	G3
1990	Super Fan	3	Shane Sellers	Steven Penrod	Hermitage Farm (Warner L. Jones Jr.)	1 3/16 m	2:02.40	G3
1989	Ebros	3	Jorge Velásquez	Richard J. Lundy	Allen E. Paulson	1 3/16 m	1:58.40	G2
1988	Race not held							
1987	Blue Finn	3	Dave Penna	James E. Day	Sam-Son Farm	1 1/8 m	1:56.40	G2
1986	Marvin's Policy	3	Sandy Hawley	Darrell Vienna	David Milch	1 1/8 m	1:49.20	G2
1985	Montagnet	3	Don Brumfield	Dennis W. Ebert	Jim H. Plemmons	1 3/16 m	1:56.40	G2
1984	Tall Grass Walker	3	Earlie Fires	Henry M. "Pete" Wylie	Kenneth C. Plattner	1 1/8 m	1:53.40	G2
1983-1	Jack Slade	3	Don Brumfield	David C. Kassen	Andrew Adams	1 1/8 m	1:49.60	G2
1983-2	Susie's Table	3	Gerland Gallitano	Robin Frank	Oriental Stable (Vernal Lee & Eric Frank)	1 1/8 m	1:49.80	G2
1982	Lucence	3	Pat Day	Steven Penrod	Claiborne Farm	1 1/8 m	1:52.80	G2
1981	Waterway Drive	3	Jerry Bailey	Robin Frank	Eric Frank	1 1/8 m	1:56.80	G2
1980	The Messanger	3	Pat Day	Oscar Dishman Jr.	Archie Donaldson	1 1/8 m	1:58.00	G3
1979	Rossi Gold	3	Ron Hirdes	Raymond S. Lawrence Jr.	Frank McMahon	1 1/8 m	1:53.60	G3
1978	John Henry	3	Jose Amy	Robert A. Donato	Dotsam Stable	1 1/16 m	1:45.80	G3
1977	True Colors	3	Ed Delahoussaye	Willard C. Freeman	Robert C. Billips	1 1/16 m	1:44.80	G3
1976	Effervescing	3	Rudy Turcotte	John W. Russell	Ogden Phipps	1 1/16 m	1:44.60	G3
1975-1	Brents Prince	3	Ben Feliciano	James Morgan	Mary Classen	1 1/16 m	1:43.80	G3
1975-2	Crafty Drone	3	John Powell	Richard P. Hazelton	Harham Farm	1 1/16 m	1:45.80	G3
1974-1	Emperor Rex	3	Hector Viera	Howard M. Tesher	Harold Snowden	1 m	1:36.60	G3
1974-2	Hasty Flyer	3	Mike Miceli	Harry Trotsek	Hasty House Farm	1 m	1:37.20	G3
1973	King's Reel	3	Robert Breen	William J. Resseguet Jr.	Gerald Robins	1 m	1:37.20	G3
1972	King's Bishop	3	Jacinto Vásquez	Thomas J. Kelly	Craig F. Cullinan Jr.	1 1/16 m	1:43.40	
1971	Mr. Pow Wow	3	Ray Broussard	Joseph M. Bollero	Greenbrier Stable	1 1/16 m	1:43.40	
1970	Pass The Drink	3	Mike Venezia	Edward A. Neloy	Ogden Phipps	1 1/16 m	1:43.80	
1969	Larceny Kid	3	David Whited	MacKenzie Miller	Cragwood Stables	1 1/16 m	1:43.40	
1968	Come On II	7	Walter Blum	Jose d'Agostino	Alberto d'Agostino	1 1/16 m	1:47.80	
1967	Assagai	4	Larry Adams	MacKenzie Miller	Cragwood Stables	1 1/8 m	1:51.40	
1966	Maris	4	Earlie Fires	Willard L. Proctor	Josephine Potrykus	1 1/16 m	1:42.80	
1965	Lord Date	4	Mickey Solomone	Frank H. Merrill Jr.	North Star Ranch	1 1/16 m	1:43.20	
1964	Rambler II	5	Herberto Hinojosa	Warren Stute	Kerr Stable	1 1/16 m	1:42.00	
1963	Bronze Babu	5	Herberto Hinojosa	Jose de Murguiondo	Hill 'n' Dale Farms	1 1/8 m	1:55.80	
1962	Porvenir II	8	Avelino Gomez	Harry Trotsek	Hasty House Farm	1 1/16 m	1:43.20	
1961	Oink	4	Johnny Sellers	Steve Ippolito	Jacnot Stable (O. T. & Jack R. Hogan)	1 1/16 m	1:43.00	
