= Oklahoma Derby =

- Class: Grade III
- Location: Remington Park; Oklahoma City, United States
- Inaugurated: 1989 (as Remington Park Derby)
- Race type: Thoroughbred – Flat racing
- Website: Remington Park

Race information
- Distance: 1 1/8 miles (9 furlongs)
- Surface: Dirt
- Track: left-handed
- Qualification: Three-year-olds
- Weight: 124 lbs
- Purse: $400,000 (since 2021)

The Oklahoma Derby is a Grade III American Thoroughbred horse race for three years olds, over a distance of 1 1/8 miles (9 furlongs) on the dirt held annually late September at Remington Park located in Oklahoma City, Oklahoma. The event currently carries an offered purse of $400,000.

== History ==
The inaugural running of the event was on 18 March 1989 as the Remington Park Derby held over the 1 1/16 miles distance and was won by the Oklahoma bred Clever Trevor in a time 1:43.00. Clever Trevor would later win the Grade I Arlington Classic and Remington Park would have a Black Type Stakes named after him.

The event was moved to the late summer, early fall schedule in 1997. That same year, the distance had increased to 1 3/16 miles. While in 1998, the distance decreased to 1 1/8 miles.

In 1999 the event was classified as Grade III and it would hold this status until 2004. From 2005 to 2012 the event was ungraded and in 2013 it regained its Grade III status.

In 2001 the race was renamed the Oklahoma Derby. It is the track's flagship event and the most lucrative Thoroughbred race at Remington Park.

== Records ==
Speed record:

- 1 1/8 miles: 1:48.00 – Classic Cat (1998)
- 1 1/16 miles: 1:42.80 - Dazzling Falls (1995)

Margins:

- 10 lengths – Comic Truth (2003)

Most wins by a Jockey:

- 3 – M. Clifton Berry (2003, 2006, 2015)
- 3 – Garrett Gomez (1993, 1995, 2001)

Most wins by a trainer:

- 4 – Brad H. Cox (2019, 2020, 2021, 2024)

Most wins by an owner:

- 2 – Kenneth and Sarah Ramsey (2010, 2012)

== Winners ==
Year	Winner	Jockey	Trainer	Owner	Distance	Time	Purse	Grade	Ref
Oklahoma Derby
2026	Silent Tactic	José Ortiz	Mark E. Casse	John C. Oxley & Victoriam Farm	1 1/8 miles	1:50.31	$400,000	III	
2025	Bracket Buster	Luis Saez	Victoria Oliver	BBN Racing	1 1/8 miles	1:49.99	$400,000	III	
2024	Most Wanted	Florent Geroux	Brad H. Cox	Gary & Mary West	1 1/8 miles	1:49.46	$400,000	III	
2023	How Did He Do That	Stewart Elliott	Steven M. Asmussen	J. Kirk & Judy Robison	1 1/8 miles	1:50.34	$400,000	III	
2022	Rattle N Roll	Brian Hernandez Jr.	Kenneth G. McPeek	Lucky Seven Stable	1 1/8 miles	1:49.50	$400,000	III	
2021	Warrant	Joel Rosario	Brad H. Cox	Twin Creeks Racing Stables	1 1/8 miles	1:50.76	$400,000	III	
2020	Shared Sense	Richard Eramia	Brad H. Cox	Godolphin Racing	1 1/8 miles	1:49.88	$200,000	III	
2019	Owendale	Florent Geroux	Brad H. Cox	Rupp Racing	1 1/8 miles	1:49.29	$400,000	III	
2018	Lone Sailor	James Graham	Thomas M. Amoss	G M B Racing	1 1/8 miles	1:49.97	$400,000	III	
2017	Untrapped	Ricardo Santana Jr.	Steven M. Asmussen	Michael Langford	1 1/8 miles	1:48.62	$400,000	III	
2016	Texas Chrome	C. J. McMahon	J. R. Caldwell	Keene Thoroughbreds	1 1/8 miles	1:48.94	$400,000	III	
2015	Shotgun Kowboy	M. Clifton Berry	C. R. Trout	C. R. Trout	1 1/8 miles	1:48.91	$424,000	III	
2014	Tonito M.	Rafael Bejarano	Jerry Hollendorfer	M. Racing Group	1 1/8 miles	1:50.41	$400,000	III	
2013	Broadway Empire	Rico W. Walcott	Robertino Diodoro	Randy Howg, Bob Butz, Fouad El Kardy & Running Rabbit	1 1/8 miles	1:49.44	$400,000	III	
2012	Politicallycorrect	Kent J. Desormeaux	Wesley A. Ward	Kenneth and Sarah Ramsey	1 1/8 miles	1:50.23	$400,000	Listed	
2011	Redeemed	Edgar S. Prado	Anthony W. Dutrow	Jay Em Ess Stable	1 1/8 miles	1:49.20	$400,000	Listed	
2010	Pleasant Prince	Joel Rosario	Wesley A. Ward	Kenneth and Sarah Ramsey	1 1/8 miles	1:48.81	$400,000	Listed	
2009	Fiddlers Afleet	Channing Hill	Michael E. Hushion	Marc C. Ferrell	1 1/8 miles	1:51.00	$400,000	Listed	
2008	Golden Yank	Jamie Theriot	Gary A. Thomas	Millard R. Seldin Revocable Trust	1 1/8 miles	1:50.47	$350,000	Listed	
2007	§ Going Ballistic	Timothy T. Doocy	Donnie K. Von Hemel	Kindred Thoroughbred	1 1/8 miles	1:49.74	$300,000	Listed	
2006	Mr. Pursuit	M. Clifton Berry	Joseph Petalino	Illona Whetstone	1 1/8 miles	1:50.21	$273,000	Listed	
2005	Military Major	Jeffery Burningham	Michael Caraman	Kinsman Stable	1 1/8 miles	1:49.49	$150,000	Listed	
2004	Wally's Choice	Luis S. Quinonez	Michael E. Biehler	Curtis Sampson & Joyce and Wally McNeil	1 1/8 miles	1:50.26	$167,250	III	
2003	Comic Truth	M. Clifton Berry	Patrick J. Daly	Dr. K. K. & Dr. Vilasini D. Jayaraman	1 1/8 miles	1:49.59	$159,000	III	
2002	The Judge Sez Who	Cornelio Velasquez	Milton W. Wolfson	Sez Who Racing	1 1/8 miles	1:49.34	$295,000	III	
2001	Top Hit	Garrett K. Gomez	R. Kory Owens	Triple AAA Ranch	1 1/8 miles	1:49.79	$300,000	III	
Remington Park Derby
2000	Performing Magic	Shane Sellers	John Shirreffs	The Thoroughbred Corporation	1 1/8 miles	1:50.36	$300,000	III	
1999	Temperance Time	Timothy T. Doocy	Kenny P. Smith	Robert C. Barker & Elmer Moses	1 1/8 miles	1:49.40	$300,000	III	
1998	Classic Cat	Shane Sellers	David C. Cross Jr.	Gary M. Garber	1 1/8 miles	1:48.00	$300,000	Listed	
1997	Wild Rush	Gary L. Stevens	Richard E. Mandella	Frank Stronach	1 3/16 miles	1:53.60	$300,000	Listed	
1996	Semoran	Russell Baze	Bob Baffert	Donald R. Dizney & James E. English	1 1/16 miles	1:46.60	$300,000	Listed	
1995	Dazzling Falls	Garrett K. Gomez	Chuck Turco	Chateau Ridge Farms	1 1/16 miles	1:42.80	$300,000	Listed	
1994	Smilin Singin Sam	Larry Melancon	Niall M. O'Callaghan	Dogwood Stable	1 1/16 miles	1:43.20	$300,000	Listed	
1993	§ Marked Tree	Garrett K. Gomez	Thomas K. Bohannan	Loblolly Stable	1 1/16 miles	1:43.80	$300,900	Listed	
1992	Vying Victor	Ron D. Hansen	Ian P. D. Jory	Mr. & Mrs. Marvin Malmuth	1 1/16 miles	1:43.60	$250,000	Listed	
1991	Queen's Gray Bee	Patrick W. Steinberg	Donnie K. Von Hemel	Virginia Singletary	1 1/16 miles	1:44.30	$250,000	Listed	
1990	§ Wicked Destiny	John Lively	Charles L. Taliaferro	Jack Choate	1 1/16 miles	1:43.00	$250,000	Listed	
1989	Clever Trevor	Donald R. Pettinger	Donnie K. Von Hemel	Don C. & Cheri McNeill	1 1/16 miles	1:43.00	$250,000	Listed	

Notes:
§ Ran as an entry

== See also ==
List of American and Canadian Graded races
