= Caleb's Posse =

American-bred Thoroughbred racehorse

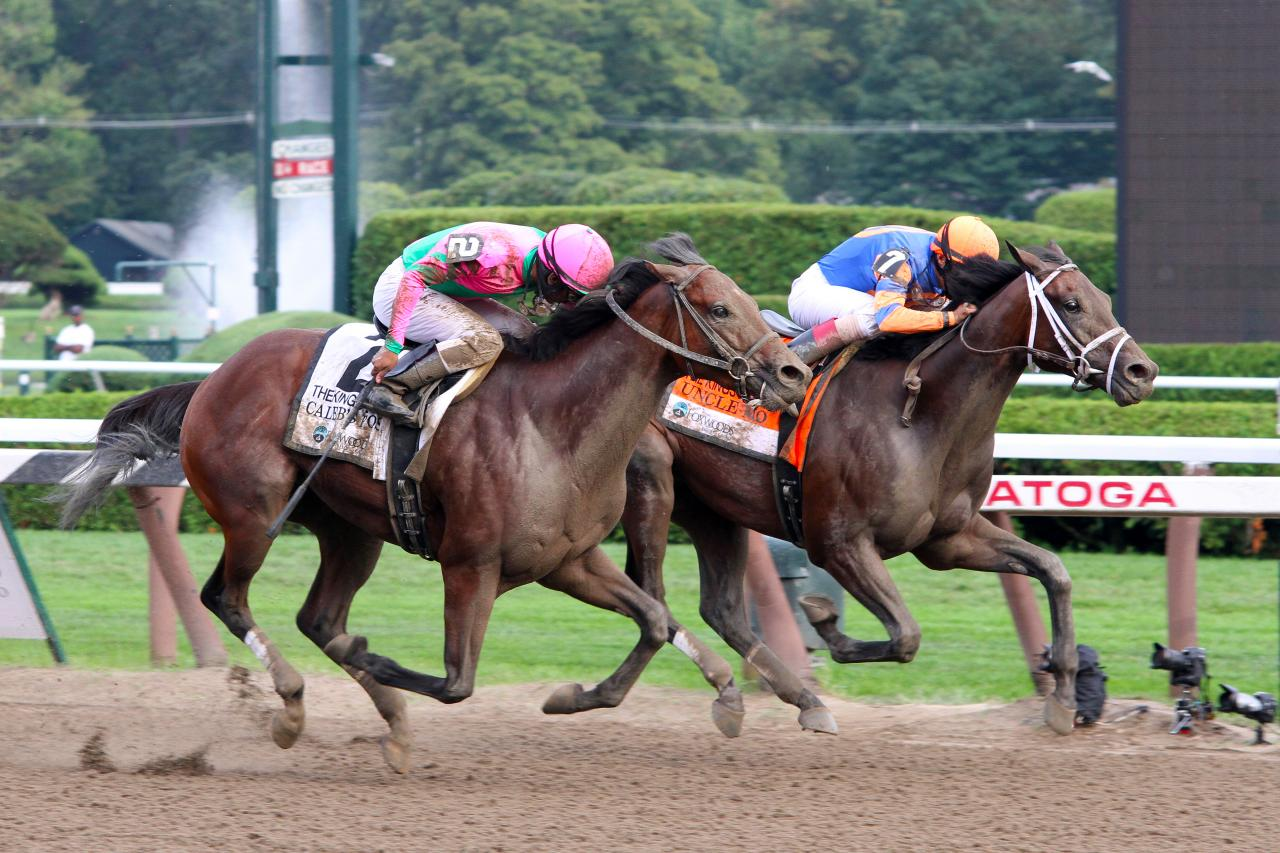
- Caleb's posse running down Uncle Mo in the Kings Bishop Stakes
- Sire: Posse
- Grandsire: Silver Deputy
- Dam: Abbey's Missy
- Damsire: Slewacide
- Sex: Stallion
- Foaled: 8 April 2008
- Country: United States
- Colour: Bay
- Breeder: Don McNeill
- Owner: McNeill Stables & Cheyenne Stables
- Trainer: Donnie K. Von Hemel
- Record: 19: 8-5-2
- Earnings: $1,423,379

Major wins
- Ohio Derby (2011); Amsterdam Stakes (2011); King's Bishop Stakes (2011); Breeders' Cup Dirt Mile (2011)

Honours
- Oklahoma Horse Racing Hall of Fame 2017)

Caleb's Posse (foaled April 4, 2008) is a retired American Thoroughbred racehorse and a Breeders Cup champion.

== 2-year-old season ==
Trained by Donnie K. Von Hemel, Caleb's Posse ran a total of 6 times as a 2-year-old. His three wins were in the a maiden special weight, allowance, and the non graded Clever Trevor Stakes. His only graded stakes effort was in the Gr. 3 Arlington-Washington Futurity, where he finished 3rd.

== 3-year-old season ==
After three tries for a win, Caleb's Posse took the Ohio Derby and also won the Amsterdam Stakes. This was followed up with a close nose victory in the Grade 1 Kings Bishop. He then won his signature race in the Breeders' Cup Dirt Mile over Shackleford and future dirt mile winner Tapizar.

== 4-year-old season ==
As a 4-year-old, Caleb's Posse ran three times, finishing second every time. In his last race, he lost to Shackleford by a nose.

== Career and earnings ==
Overall Caleb's Posse record was 19–8–5–2 with a total money earnings of 1,423,379.
