= William H. Fires =

American racehorse trainer

Personal information
- Born: July 23, 1940 (age 86) Rivervale, Arkansas, United States
- Occupation: Trainer

Horse racing career
- Sport: Horse racing
- Career wins: 1,417+ (ongoing)

Major racing wins
- Martha Washington Stakes (1988, 1995, 2005); Turfway Park Fall Championship Stakes (1990); Essex Handicap (2009); Southwest Stakes (2011); Arkansas Derby (2011); Remington Springboard Mile Stakes (2015)

Significant horses
- Archarcharch

William H. "Jinks" Fires (born July 23, 1940, in Rivervale, Arkansas) is an American Thoroughbred racehorse trainer. He is the trainer of 2011 Arkansas Derby winner Archarcharch which finished fifteenth in the Kentucky Derby.

Jinks Fires is a brother to U.S. Racing Hall of Fame jockey Earlie Fires.
