= J. Bert Sonnier =

American horse trainer

Personal information
- Born: October 1, 1938 (age 87) Church Point, Louisiana
- Occupation: Trainer

Horse racing career
- Sport: Horse racing
- Career wins: 1,531

Major racing wins
- Arkansas Derby (1968); Hawthorne Gold Cup (1968, 1969); El Encino Stakes (1969); Brooklyn Handicap (1969); Californian Stakes (1969); Santa Anita Handicap (1969); Metropolitan Handicap (1970); San Pasqual Handicap (1970); Vizcaya Stakes (1973); W. L. McKnight Handicap (1973, 1981); Poinsettia Handicap (1974); Arlington-Washington Futurity Stakes (1979, 1982, 1985); Arlington-Washington Lassie Stakes (1979); Suwannee River Handicap (1979); Cornhusker Handicap (1980); Essex Handicap (1980); Equipoise Mile (1981); Pan American Handicap (1981); Count Fleet Sprint Handicap (1982); Sea o'Erin Stakes (1983); Golden Rod Stakes (1986); Iroquois Stakes (1986); First Lady Handicap (1988); Southwest Handicap (1989); Thoroughbred Club of America Stakes (1989); Arlington Oaks (1992); Ashland Stakes (1993); Davona Dale Stakes (1993); Sixty Sails Handicap (1993); Broward Handicap (1995); Forerunner Stakes (1995); Skip Away Handicap (1995); Tampa Bay Derby (1995); Kenny Noe, Jr. Handicap (1997)

Racing awards
- Champion trainer at Arlington Park (1983,1985)

Significant horses
- Funistrada, Nodouble, Meadowlake, Stage Door Betty

James Bert Sonnier (born October 1, 1938 in Church Point, Louisiana) is a retired trainer of thoroughbred racehorses. A Cajun, at age eight he began galloping horses and learned about competitive racing at area bush tracks.

In 1979, Bert Sonnier became the first trainer to saddle the winners of both the Arlington-Washington Futurity Stakes (Execution's Reason) and the Arlington-Washington Lassie Stakes (Sissy's Time) in the same year.

Bert Sonnier was the Champion trainer at Arlington Park in 1983 and again in 1985. During his career, he conditioned a number of horses including the injury-prone Meadowlake, sire of the great Meadow Star, the 1990 American Champion Two-Year-Old Filly and winner of the Breeders' Cup Juvenile Fillies. Sonnier's best runner was Nodouble who earned back-to-back American Champion Older Male Horse honors in 1969 and 1970.

Sonnier retired having won 1,531 races, saddling his last runner on February 10, 2003 at Gulfstream Park in Hallandale Beach, Florida.

His daughter Sheila married jockey Alex Solis.
