= Bayakoa Stakes (Oaklawn Park) =

- Class: Grade III
- Location: Oaklawn Park; Hot Springs, Arkansas
- Inaugurated: 1992
- Race type: Thoroughbred - Flat racing
- Website: www.oaklawn.com

Race information
- Distance: 1 1/16 miles
- Surface: Dirt
- Track: left-handed
- Qualification: fillies and mares, four years old and older
- Weight: 122 lbs with allowances
- Purse: $250,000 (2021)

The Bayakoa Stakes is a Grade III American Thoroughbred horse race for fillies and mares that are four years old or older, over a distance of one and one-sixteenth miles on the dirt track held annually in February at Oaklawn Park in Hot Springs, Arkansas. The event currently carries a purse of $250,000.

== History ==
The race was inaugurated in 1992 and named in honor of U.S. Racing Hall of Fame inductee, Bayakoa who had won the 1989 Grade I Apple Blossom Handicap at Oaklawn Park.

In 1993 event was run over a longer distance of 1 1/8 miles and in 1995 the event was not held.

The event was upgraded to a Grade III event in 2015.

== Records ==
Speed record:

- 1 1/16 miles – 1:42.52 - Really Polish (1999)

Margins:

- 6 1/2 lengths – Don't Tell Sophia (2013)

Most wins by a jockey

- 4 - Terry J. Thompson (2007, 2010, 2011, 2012)

Most wins by a trainer

- 4 - Steven M. Asmussen (2003, 2006, 2017, 2019)
- 4 - Brad H. Cox (2016, 2021, 2023, 2024)

== Winners ==
Year	Winner	Age	Jockey	Trainer	Owner	Distance	Time	Purse	Grade	Ref
2026	Nitrogen	4	Jose L. Ortiz	Mark E. Casse	D. J. Stable	1 1/16 miles	1:43.53	$250,000	III	
2025	Wild Bout Hilary	4	Charles J. McMahon	Tanner Tracy	5 Finger Racing	1 1/16 miles	1:44.15	$250,000	III	
2024	Comparative	4	Manuel Franco	Brad H. Cox	Godolphin	1 1/16 miles	1:44.81	$250,000	III	
2023	A Mo Reay	4	Florent Geroux	Brad H. Cox	Hunter Valley Farm	1 1/16 miles	1:45.07	$250,000	III	
2022	Miss Bigly	6	Ramon Vazquez	Philip D'Amato	Agave Racing Stable, Living The Dream Stables & Rockin Robin Racing Stables	1 1/16 miles	1:44.82	$250,000	III	
2021	Monomoy Girl	6	Florent Geroux	Brad H. Cox	My Racehorse Stable, Spendthrift Farm & Madaket Stables	1 1/16 miles	1:45.92	$250,000	III	
2020	Go Google Yourself	5	Brian Hernandez Jr.	Paul J. McGee	Jay Em Ess Stable	1 1/16 miles	1:43.65	$200,000	III	
2019	She's a Julie	4	Ricardo Santana Jr.	Steven M. Asmussen	Whispering Oaks Farm, Team Hanley, T. & A. Cambron, Bradley Thor., Madaket Stables	1 1/16 miles	1:43.55	$200,000	III	
2018	Streamline	6	Gary L. Stevens	Brian Williamson	Nancy A. Vanier & Cartwright Thoroughbreds	1 1/16 miles	1:47.22	$150,000	III	
2017	Terra Promessa	4	Ricardo Santana Jr.	Steven M. Asmussen	Stonestreet Stables	1 1/16 miles	1:43.18	$150,000	III	
2016	Call Pat	6	Joseph Rocco Jr.	Brad H. Cox	Miller Racing LLC (Myron Miller)	1 1/16 miles	1:45.81	$100,000	III	
2015	Mufajaah	4	Emmanuel Esquivel	Daniel C. Peitz	Shadwell Stable	1 1/16 miles	1:45.04	$100,000	III	
2014	Don't Tell Sophia	6	Channing Hill	Philip A. Sims	Philip A. Sims & Jerry Namy	1 1/16 miles	1:44.78	$100,000	Listed	
2013	Don't Tell Sophia	5	Robby Albarado	Philip A. Sims	Philip A. Sims & Jerry Namy	1 1/16 miles	1:44.00	$100,000	Listed	
2012	Absinthe Minded	5	Terry J. Thompson	D. Wayne Lukas	Briland Farm	1 1/16 miles	1:44.14	$98,000	Listed	
2011	Absinthe Minded	4	Terry J. Thompson	D. Wayne Lukas	Briland Farm	1 1/16 miles	1:43.62	$100,000	Listed	
2010	Payton d'Oro	4	Terry J. Thompson	Cindy Jones	John Ferris, Mike Pressley, et al.	1 1/16 miles	1:43.93	$98,000	Listed	
2009	Euphony	4	Cliff Berry	Donnie K. Von Hemel	Pin Oak Stable	1 1/16 miles	1:44.00	$100,000	Listed	
2008	Buy the Barrel	4	Gabriel Saez	J. Larry Jones	Hinkle Farms (Tom Hinkle)	1 1/16 miles	1:44.29	$100,000	Listed	
2007	Gasia	4	Terry J. Thompson	J. Larry Jones	Susan Knoll	1 1/16 miles	1:45.32	$100,000	Listed	
2006	Capeside Lady	4	Stewart Elliott	Steven M. Asmussen	Dapple Stable	1 1/16 miles	1:44.12	$100,000	Listed	
2005	Two Trail Sioux	4	John McKee	Wallace Dollase	John D. Gunther & Don Winton	1 1/16 miles	1:43.61	$100,000	Listed	
2004	La Reason	4	Justin Shepherd	David R. Vance	Ron Kirby & Tom Kirby	1 1/16 miles	1:43.68	$75,000	Listed	
2003	McKinney	5	Carlos H. Marquez Jr.	Steven M. Asmussen	Nelson Bunker Hunt	1 1/16 miles	1:44.20	$48,000	Listed	
2002	Due to Win	7	Justin J. Vitek	Howard Scarberry	Penny Scarberry	1 1/16 miles	1:44.20	$75,000	Listed	
2001	Dorothy Ann	5	Joseph C. Judice	Robert E. Holthus	James T. Hines Jr.	1 1/16 miles	1:45.80	$50,000	Listed	
2000	Tuscania	4	Michael R. Morgan	Joseph Petalino	Lazy E Racing Stable, et al.	1 1/16 miles	1:43.80	$50,000	Listed	
1999	Really Polish	4	James Lopez	Joseph Petalino	Team Valor International	1 1/16 miles	1:42.52	$50,000		
1998	Water Street	4	Calvin H. Borel	Peter M. Vestal	Willmott Stables, Inc. (Peter S. Willmott)	1 1/16 miles	1:44.00	$40,000		
1997	Omi	4	Pat Day	William I. Mott	Donald R. Dizney	1 1/16 miles	1:44.20	$40,000		
1996	Herat of Gold	4	Kent J. Desormeaux	Bobby C. Barnett	John A. Franks	1 1/16 miles	1:43.80	$40,000		
1995	Race not held									
1994	Eskimo's Angel	5	Pat Valenzuela	Bobby C. Barnett	John A. Franks	1 1/16 miles	1:43.67	$55,400		
1993	Teddy's Top Ten	4	Jerry D. Bailey	Bobby C. Barnett	John A. Franks	1 1/8 miles	1:50.20	$44,200		
1992	Timetocheckin	5	Pat Day	Terrence W. Dunlavy	Charles Randolph	1 1/16 miles	1:45.60	$40,128		

== See also ==
- List of American and Canadian Graded races
