= W. Bret Calhoun =

American racehorse trainer

Bret Calhoun
Personal information
- Born: May 12, 1964 (age 62) Dallas, Texas, United States
- Occupation: Trainer

Horse racing career
- Sport: Horse racing
- Career wins: 2,630+ (ongoing)

Major racing wins
- Royal Heroine Stakes (2004); Arlington-Washington Futurity Stakes (2003); Silverbulletday Stakes (2006); Aegon Turf Sprint Stakes (2008); Shakertown Stakes (2008); Remington Springboard Mile Stakes (2010, 2013)

Significant horses
- Cactus Ridge, Mr. Nightlinger

W. Bret Calhoun (born May 12, 1964, in Dallas, Texas) is an American Thoroughbred racehorse trainer. The son of a school teacher who also owned and trained horses, he attended Texas Tech University but left before graduating.

Calhoun began his professional training career in 1993 and earned his first win on April 1, 1994. He has competed regularly at Louisiana Downs and Fair Grounds Race Course in Louisiana and in Texas at Sam Houston Race Park, Oklahoma City's Remington Park, and Lone Star Park. In Kentucky in 2008, Calhoun won the Aegon Turf Sprint Stakes at Churchill Downs and the Grade I Shakertown Stakes at Keeneland Race Course with Mr. Nightlinger.

In 2008, Bret Calhoun finished fourth in total wins for the year among all trainers in the United States. His horses won 228 races and earned $5,226,163.
