= Donald R. Pettinger =

American jockey

Don Pettinger
Personal information
- Born: December 21, 1961 (age 64) Lamar, Colorado, U.S.
- Occupation: Jockey

Horse racing career
- Sport: Horse racing
- Career wins: 3,388

Major racing wins
- Hanshin Cup Handicap (1984); Arlington Classic (1989); Remington Park Derby (1989); Martha Washington Stakes (1991); Arlington Matron Stakes (1996); Modesty Handicap (1996, 2004); Oaklawn Breeders' Cup Stakes (1996, 2003); Round Table Stakes (1996, 2004); Count Fleet Sprint Handicap (1998); Essex Handicap (2001); Razorback Breeders' Cup Handicap (2001, 2002); Fantasy Stakes (2002); Honeybee Stakes (2002, 2003, 2004); Valley View Stakes (2002); WinStar Galaxy Stakes (2003)

Honours
- Oklahoma Horse Racing Hall of Fame (2011)

Significant horses
- Clever Trevor, Bien Nicole, Valid Expectations, Mr. Ross, Bedanken

Donald Ray Pettinger (born December 21, 1961, in Lamar, Colorado) is an American jockey in Thoroughbred flat horse racing.

He is the winner of a number of stakes races, including the 1989 Arlington Classic at Chicago's Arlington Park and the 2002 Valley View Stakes and the 2003 WinStar Galaxy Stakes at Keeneland Race Course.

In 2011, Donald Pettinger was inducted into the Oklahoma Horse Racing Hall of Fame.
