= Shane Sellers =

American singer-songwriter

Personal information
- Born: September 24, 1966 (age 59) Erath, Louisiana
- Occupation: Jockey

Horse racing career
- Sport: Horse racing
- Career wins: 4,147 (through 2009)

Major racing wins
- Cornhusker Handicap (1989); Round Table Handicap (1990); Arlington Oaks (1991, 1993); Ashland Stakes (1991, 1993, 2000); Laurance Armour Handicap (1991); Hopemont Stakes (1992, 1993); American Derby (1993, 1994); Kentucky Cup Turf Stakes (1994, 1999); Appalachian Stakes (1995); Indian Summer Stakes (1995, 1996); Secretariat Stakes (1996); Jockey Club Gold Cup (1996); Woodbine Mile (1996); Blue Grass Stakes (1996, 1997, 2004 ) Massachusetts Handicap (1997); Suburban Handicap (1997); Florida Derby (1998, 1999); Joe Hirsch Turf Classic Invitational Handicap (1998); Matron Stakes (1998); Shakertown Stakes (1998, 1999, 2004); Oklahoma Derby (1998, 2000); Diana Handicap (1999); Dogwood Stakes (1999, 2003); Saratoga Breeders' Cup Handicap (1999); Lane's End Stakes (1999); Maker's Mark Mile Stakes (2000); Black Gold Stakes (2003) American Classics / Breeders' Cup wins Breeders' Cup Juvenile Fillies (1997); Breeders' Cup Turf (1998)

Significant horses
- Skip Away, Black Tie Affair; Countess Diana, Buck's Boy
- Updated on August 01, 2007

Shane Jude Sellers (born September 24, 1966, in Erath, Louisiana) is an American Thoroughbred horse racing jockey. At age eleven, he began working around horses and in 1983 rode his first winner at Evangeline Downs.

Sellers won several national riding championships and was a leading rider at Arlington Park. Over his career, he rode in the Kentucky Derby 14 consecutive times, with his best finish a third with Wild Gale in 1993. The two took third again that year in the Belmont Stakes.

He rode 29 thoroughbreds in the Breeders Cup races, with two wins in 1997 and 1998, however one of his most exciting wins had to be his ride of Skip Away over the great Cigar in the Jockey Club Gold Cup in 1996.

During his career Shane Sellers won more than 4,000 races and earned purses worth more than $122 million.

== Advertising controversy ==
Shane Sellers was also one of the first of five top jockeys to wear advertising patches in the Kentucky Derby, starting in 2004. They sued on First Amendment grounds, to be allowed to wear ad patches during the race. The ruling was issued on April 21, 2004, by U.S. District Judge John Heyburn in Louisville.

The patches, worth approximately $30,000 apiece, were legal in other Triple Crown states of New York and Maryland, but were argued by The Kentucky Horse Racing Authority that they might lead to corruption and violated racing tradition.

The other jockeys included Jerry Bailey, John Velazquez, Gary Stevens, and José A. Santos.

== Retirement ==
A serious knee injury in December 2000 kept Sellers out of racing for a year and a half. His experience led him to become an outspoken critic of the lack of proper health insurance being provided to jockeys. He returned to the track in 2002, racing until his retirement in late December 2004.

== Music career ==
In 2001, Sellers was signed to DreamWorks Nashville. His first single for the label, "Matthew, Mark, Luke and Earnhardt," peaked at number 58 on the Billboard Hot Country Singles & Tracks chart in May 2001. He released an album, also titled Matthew, Mark, Luke and Earnhardt, on Lofton Creek Records in 2003.

== Jockey ==
Sellers, along with fellow jockey Randy Romero, was featured in the 2004 HBO documentary film titled Jockey. Directed by Kate Davis, it told the story of their problems resulting from racing injuries and the effects of constant crash dieting to maintain racing weight. In 2005, Shane Sellers also appeared on CNN in a special with Paula Zahn to speak out about the serious health problems many jockeys experience as a result of the current weight limits.

Sellers last raced on June 15, 2013, at Indiana Grand Race Course.

== Later career ==
Sellers currently owns and trains horses at his farm in Broussard, Louisiana. He still lobbies racing authorities and others involved in the sport to raise jockey weight limits and improve the quality of horse racing for everyone involved in the industry.

Renowned jockey, Shane Sellers is set to make his return to racing on July 2, 2009, after a four and half year hiatus from the sport. He will be riding Ide Ball – trainer Mark Guidry – in the first race at Evangeline Downs Racetrack & Casino. The 42-year-old Erath, LA native jockey retired from racing on December 15, 2004, after amassing 4,069 wins and riding earners of nearly $130 million. He is best known for his memorable ride of Skip Away over the great Cigar in the Jockey Club Gold Cup in 1996 and his Breeder's cup wins aboard Buck's Boy and Countess Diana along with his 14-year consecutive streak of having Kentucky Derby mounts. His best finish in that Classic was a third with Wild Gale in 1993. The two took third again that year in the Belmont Stakes.

Sellers was one of the first top jockeys to wear advertising on their silks and was an advocate for better pay, health insurance, and weight issues for riders. His intentions for coming out of retirement are signified by his return to the south Louisiana track. According to Mr. Sellers, “It’s no secret to why I’ve decided to come back and why I decided to come back to Evangeline. I rode my first winner here in 1983, and it’s time for me to get back to my roots and what I love. I still believe in what I was fighting for back then, but over time I realized that my method or message was not always delivered in a respectable way. If I offended anyone, I apologize and want everyone to know that I am through with all of those causes. With my renewed commitment to God and my family, I just want to continue to do what I know and love – that’s ride. I am so thankful for the open armed response that I have received on my comeback and look forward to rekindling old friendships and relationships.”

== Freedom's Rein ==
Sellers co-wrote an autobiography with Tricia Psarreas in which he discusses his fights for higher jockey weights, better health insurance, and endorsements, along with the aftermath of his retirement.

== Discography ==
=== Albums ===
Title	Album details
Matthew, Mark, Luke and Earnhardt	Release date: July 8, 2003; Label: Lofton Creek Records

=== Singles ===
Year	Single	Peak positions	Album
Year	Single	US Country	Album
2001	"Matthews, Mark, Luke and Earnhardt"	58	Matthews, Mark, Luke and Earnhardt
2003	"Back to Riding Rainbows"	—	Matthews, Mark, Luke and Earnhardt
2003	"There's a Song on the Jukebox"	—	Matthews, Mark, Luke and Earnhardt
2004	"You Can't Count Me Out Yet"	—	Matthews, Mark, Luke and Earnhardt
"—" denotes releases that did not chart

== Year-end charts ==
Chart (2000–present)	Peak position
National Earnings List for Jockeys 2000	3
National Earnings List for Jockeys 2003	28
National Earnings List for Jockeys 2004	27
