= Donnie K. Von Hemel =

American horse trainer

Personal information
- Born: September 10, 1961 (age 64) Manter, Kansas, USA
- Occupation: Horse trainer

Horse racing career
- Sport: Horse racing
- Career wins: 2164 (through 2018/12/06)

Major racing wins
- Arlington Classic (1989); Saint Paul Derby (1989); Omaha Gold Cup (1991); Clark Handicap (1992); Arlington-Washington Lassie Stakes (1993); Arlington Oaks (1994, 2009); Arlington-Washington Futurity Stakes (1994); Louisiana Downs Handicap (1994); Cornhusker Handicap (1994); Arlington Matron Handicap (1995, 2009); Turfway Park Breeders' Cup Stakes (1995); Round Table Stakes (1996, 2004); Essex Handicap (2001, 2012); Razorback Handicap (2001, 2002, 2012); Honeybee Stakes (2002, 2004, 2018); Selene Stakes (2002); Fantasy Stakes (2002); Razorback Handicap (2001, 2002); Azeri Stakes (2003, 2015); WinStar Galaxy Stakes (2003); Modesty Handicap (2004); Martha Washington Stakes (2006); Remington Springboard Mile Stakes (2006); Super Derby (2007); Arlington Matron Handicap (2009); Bayakoa Stakes (2009); Amsterdam Stakes (2011); King's Bishop Stakes (2011); Ohio Derby (2011); Peter Pan Stakes (2011); Smarty Jones Stakes (2011); Oaklawn Handicap (2012); Pimlico Special Stakes (2012); Sixty Sails Handicap (2012); Southwest Stakes (2016) Breeders' Cup wins: Breeders' Cup Dirt Mile (2011)

Racing awards
- Remington Park Champion Trainer; 12 times (record)

Honors
- Oklahoma Horse Racing Hall of Fame (1998)

Significant horses
- Bien Nicole, Caleb's Posse, Clever Trevor, Mariah's Storm

Donnie K. Von Hemel (born September 10, 1961, in Manter, Kansas) is a trainer of Thoroughbred racehorses. The son of trainer Don Von Hemel and brother to trainer Kelly Von Hemel, he obtained a degree in accounting from Fort Hays State University but in 1984 chose a training career.

An Oklahoma Horse Racing Hall of Fame inductee, in 2011 Von Hemel won the richest race of his career when Caleb's Posse captured the $1 million Breeders' Cup Dirt Mile hosted that year by Churchill Downs.
