= Remington Park =

Horse racing and casino facility in Oklahoma City, OK

Coordinates: 35°31′42″N 97°28′07″W

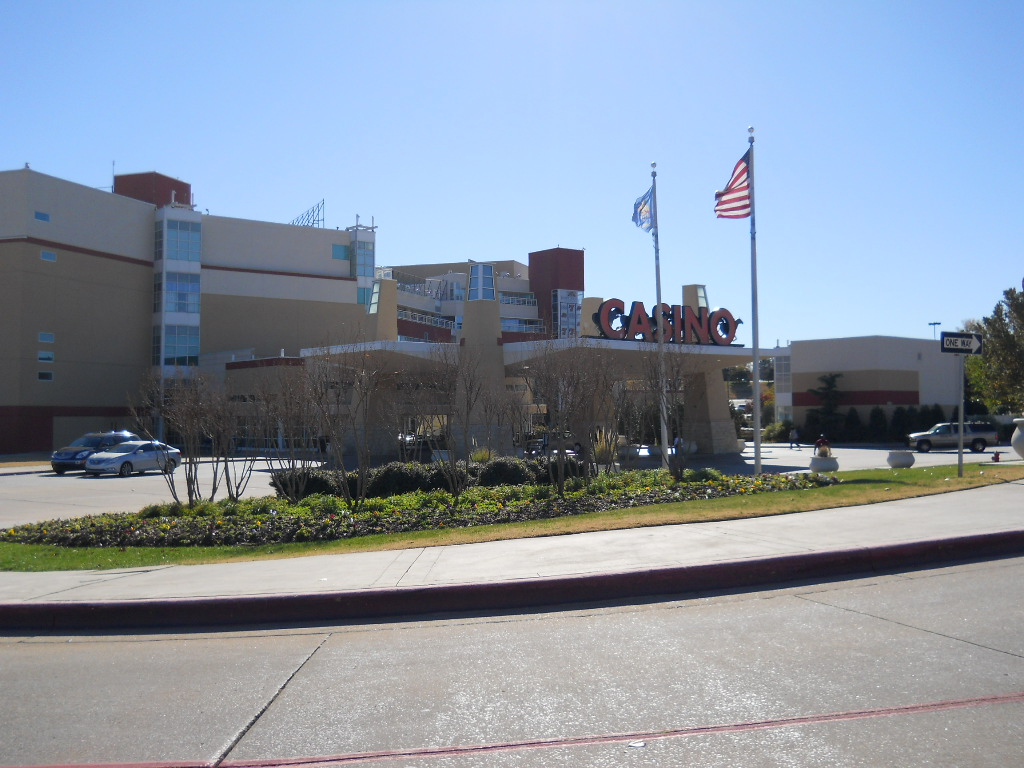
- Interactive map of Remington Park
- Location: Oklahoma City, Oklahoma
- Owned by: Chickasaw Nation
- Date opened: 1988
- Notable races: Grade III Oklahoma Derby; Grade III Remington Park Oaks; Listed Remington Springboard Mile Stakes

Remington Park is a horse racing track and casino located in Oklahoma City, Oklahoma. Built in 1988 by Edward J. DeBartolo Sr., it was the first world-class pari-mutuel track in Oklahoma. Since 2010, Global Gaming RP has owned and operated the racing facility.

== Races ==
The track features an American Quarter Horse, Paint and Appaloosa season March through June. The Thoroughbred season begins August through December. In addition, Remington Park annually hosts the richest race in Oklahoma, the $1,000,000 Heritage Place Futurity in May and the $400,000 Oklahoma Derby headlines the Thoroughbred season in the fall. The rest of the year the park is open for casino gaming and simulcast racing.

In 2016, Remington Park hosted the AMA Pro Flat Track motorcycle racing series, marking the first time since the former Oklahoma State Fairgrounds half-mile in 1999 that motorcycle racing's oldest domestic championship was run in the area. The Oklahoma City Mile is held between the end of the quarter horse season and the thoroughbred seasons.

=== Graded events ===
The following Graded events were held at Remington Park in 2023.

Grade III

- Oklahoma Derby
- Remington Park Oaks

== History ==
Remington Park was built by the late Edward J. DeBartolo Sr., the shopping mall developer who also owned Thistledown in Cleveland, Ohio and Louisiana Downs in Bossier City, Louisiana. Remington Park officially opened on September 1, 1988. At the time, it was the only American track to use a synthetic surface for its main track called Equitrack, which utilized grains of sand coated with a wax polymer. The intent was to provide a safe all-weather racing surface that would provide a fast condition for all races. The Equitrack experiment failed as the surface did not hold up during the very warm Oklahoma summers. Remington Park replaced Equitrack with a more traditional natural ingredient racing surface. No other American track used a synthetic surface until 2005, when Turfway Park installed an improved product called Polytrack. The main dirt track is one mile in circumference with the inner turf course measuring seven furlongs. Since 2005 Remington Park has included a casino with 750 slot machines. In 2009, the Horseplayers Association of North America introduced a rating system for 65 Thoroughbred racetracks in North America, and rated Remington Park #3. Remington Park is now owned by Global Gaming RP who purchased the facility via auction in 2009 from Magna Entertainment Corporation for $89.25 million dollars. Global Gaming began operations at Remington Park on January 1, 2010.
