= Steve Asmussen =

American Thoroughbred racehorse trainer

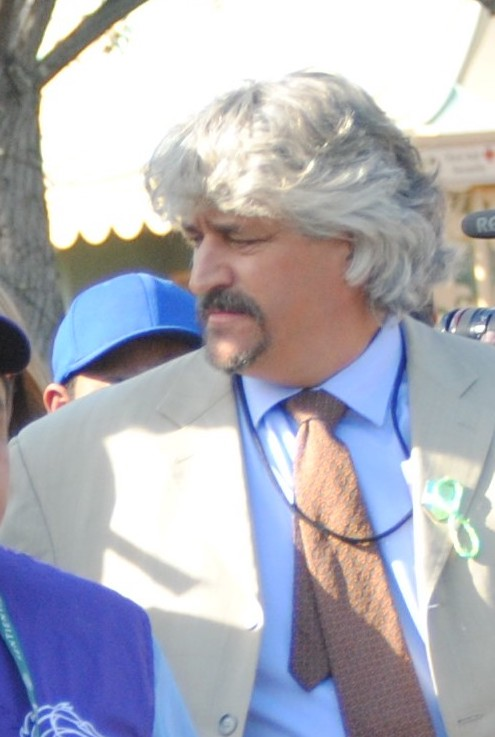
- Asmussen at the 2016 Breeders' Cup

Personal information
- Born: November 18, 1965 (age 60) Gettysburg, South Dakota, USA
- Occupations: Jockey, Trainer

Horse racing career
- Sport: Horse racing
- Career wins: 11,321+ (ongoing)

Major racing wins
- Mother Goose Stakes (1999, 2009, 2014); Spinaway Stakes (2001, 2009, 2026); Arkansas Derby (2002, 2007, 2016, 2021); Belmont Futurity Stakes (2003, 2005); Test Stakes (2003); Ballerina Handicap (2004, 2023); Kentucky Oaks (2005, 2014); Jockey Club Gold Cup (2007, 2008, 2010); Pimlico Special (2008); Stephen Foster Stakes (2008, 2017, 2026); Churchill Downs Stakes (2019, 2022, 2024); Woodward Stakes (2008, 2009, 2017); West Virginia Governor's Stakes (2008, 2012); Haskell Invitational Handicap (2009); Vosburgh Stakes (2009); Cigar Mile Handicap (2009); Alfred G. Vanderbilt Handicap (2010, 2013, 2020, 2022); Steve Sexton Mile Stakes (2011, 2013, 2018, 2022); Frizette Stakes (2011, 2015); Cotillion Stakes (2012, 2014, 2022); Manitoba Derby (2014); Apple Blossom Handicap (2015, 2019, 2023); Clark Stakes (2016, 2025); Whitney Stakes (2017); Travers Stakes (2022); Forego Stakes (2023) American Classics wins: Preakness Stakes (2007, 2009); Belmont Stakes (2016) Breeders' Cup wins: Breeders' Cup Classic (2007, 2017); Breeders' Cup Distaff (2014); Breeders' Cup Turf Sprint (2011); Breeders' Cup Juvenile Fillies (2011, 2021); Breeders' Cup Dirt Mile (2012) International wins: Dubai World Cup (2008, 2026); Nearctic Stakes (2011)

Racing awards
- Eclipse Award for Outstanding Trainer (2008, 2009); U.S. Champion Thoroughbred Trainer by wins (2002, 2004, 2005, 2007, 2008, 2009, 2010, 2011, 2013, 2020, 2021, 2022, 2023); U.S. Champion Trainer by earnings (2008, 2009, 2020)

Honors
- Fair Grounds Racing Hall of Fame (2011); National Museum of Racing and Hall of Fame (2016)

Significant horses
- Cogburn, Creator, Clairiere, Curlin, Echo Zulu, Epicenter, Gunite Gun Runner, Jackie's Warrior, Lagynos, Magnitude, Midnight Bisou, Midnight Bourbon, Mitole, My Miss Aurelia, Pauline's Pearl, Rachel Alexandra, Red Route One, Society, Skelly, Tapizar, Untapable

Steven Mark Asmussen (born November 18, 1965) is an American Thoroughbred racehorse trainer. The leading trainer in North America by wins, he is a two-time winner of the Eclipse Award for Outstanding Trainer and was inducted into the National Museum of Racing and Hall of Fame in 2016. His horses have won the Breeders' Cup Classic, Preakness Stakes, Belmont Stakes, Travers Stakes, Breeders' Cup Distaff, Kentucky Oaks and Dubai World Cup.

== Background ==
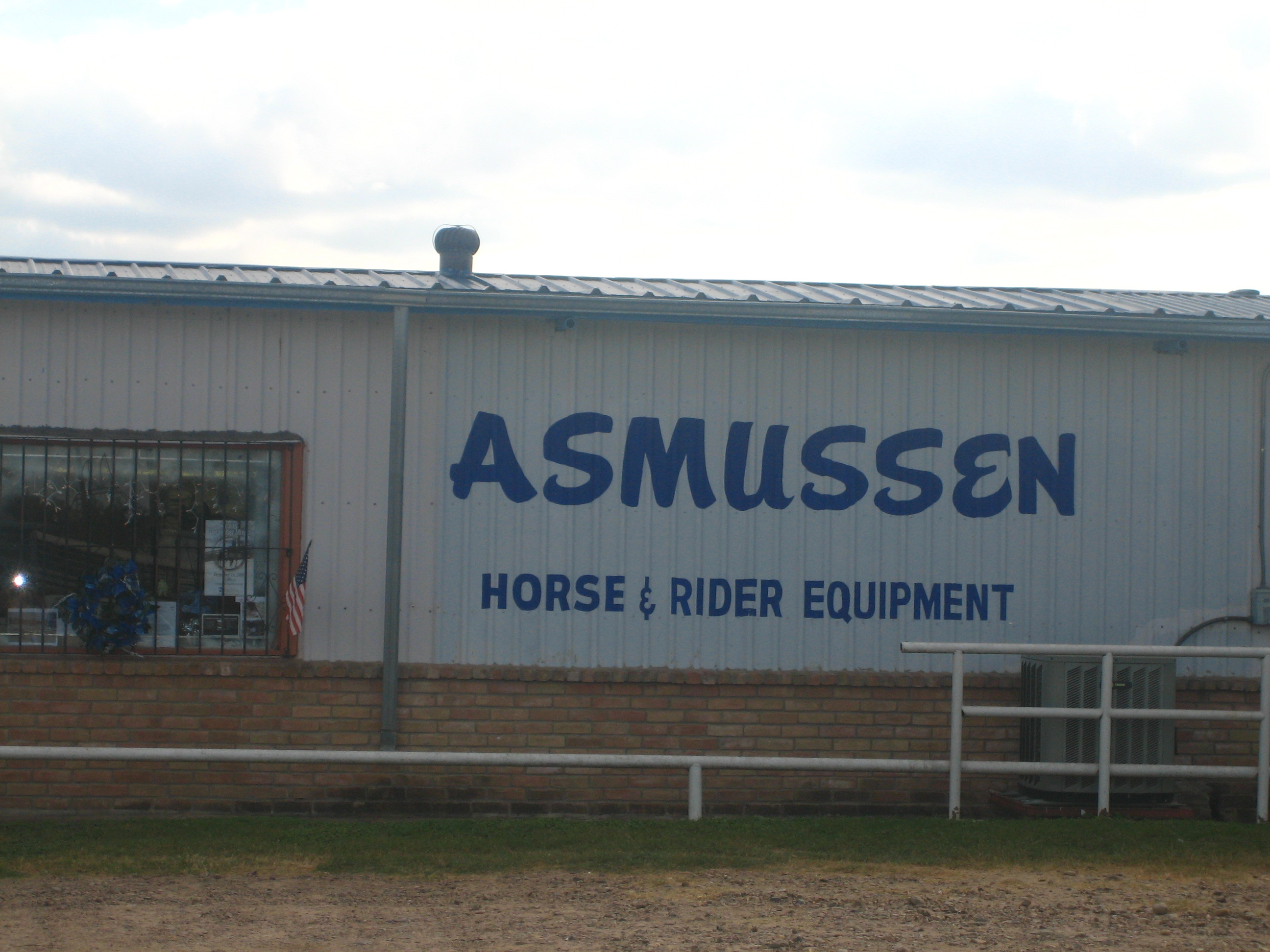
Asmussen Horse and Rider Equipment is located near the intersection of Saunders and the Bob Bullock Loop in eastern Laredo.

Asmussen was born in Gettysburg, South Dakota, then moved to Laredo, Texas at age two. His father, Keith, is a retired jockey and his mother Marilyn is a trainer who became the first woman to win a major quarter horse race with Vespero in the 1978 Kansas Futurity. They now operate El Primero Training Center and the Asmussen Horse Center, a breeding and sales operation, both in Laredo. The family was close-knit; Asmussen's grandmother, Helen M. Asmussen, died at the age of eighty-three, on Mother's Day, 2007. Asmussen attended her funeral instead of going to the post position draw for the Preakness Stakes that he later won with Curlin.

Steve Asmussen's older brother, Cash Asmussen, currently a trainer himself, is a retired Eclipse Award-winning jockey with championships in Europe as well.

Asmussen began riding as a jockey at age sixteen, competing for two years at racetracks in New Mexico, California, and New York until his height and weight ended his riding career. "No one would believe me if I didn’t have the pictures to prove it," he said later, having grown to over six feet. "My parents were 5'5" and 5'2". I don't know what happened." Steve Asmussen rode 63 winners between 1982 and 1984, then turned to training after he became too heavy to ride.

Asmussen graduated from United High School in Laredo in 1985. He and his wife, Julie Marie Asmussen, have three sons.

Asmussen's sons, Keith and Erik are also jockeys.

== Training career ==
Asmussen won his first race as a trainer in 1986 at Ruidoso Downs. In 1987, he won his first stakes race with Scout Command in the Bessemer Stakes at Birmingham Race Course. His first graded stakes win did not come until 1996 when he took the Derby Trial at Churchill Downs with Valid Expectations. In 1999, he recorded his first Grade I win in the Mother Goose with Dreams Gallore.

Some of Asmussen's top horses came about as a result of his partnership with the late Jess Jackson, a wine entrepreneur who was also a horse owner and breeder; Jackson's racing operation was Stonestreet Stables. The pair campaigned Curlin and Rachel Alexandra. Another major client is Winchell Thoroughbreds, who own champions Untapable and Gun Runner.

Three Asmussen-trained horses have won individual American Triple Crown races. The first was Stonestreet-owned Curlin, who finished third in the 2007 Kentucky Derby, but then defeated Derby-winner Street Sense to win the 2007 Preakness Stakes. Curlin then finished second in the 2007 Belmont Stakes to filly Rags to Riches, and went on to take the Breeders' Cup Classic that same year. Curlin would win more Grade and Group 1 races in 2008, including the Dubai World Cup, Stephen Foster Handicap and Woodward Stakes. For his accomplishments, he was named American Horse of the Year in both 2007 and 2008.

Rachel Alexandra won the 2009 Kentucky Oaks with another trainer. She was acquired by Stonestreet after her win and transferred to the barn of Asmussen. Under the new partnership, Rachel Alexandra with jockey Calvin Borel became the first filly in 85 years to win the Preakness Stakes. She would beat colts again in the Haskell Invitational and win over older males in the Woodward Stakes en route to American Horse of the Year honors for 2009.

Asmussen also trained Creator, who won the 2016 Belmont Stakes. The owners of Creator selected Asmussen to train the horse because they were impressed by his handling of other offspring by leading sire Tapit. These include champion Untapable (Kentucky Oaks, Breeders' Cup Distaff) and Tapizar (Breeders' Cup Dirt Mile).

In 2002, Asmussen was the leading North American trainer by number of wins with 407 wins, a title he has since repeated eight times. In 2004, he set a single-season record for wins by a trainer with 555, surpassing the previous standard of 496 held since 1976 by Jack Van Berg. He broke that record in 2008 with 622 wins, then broke it again in 2009 with 650.

In 2008, Asmussen received the Eclipse Award as Outstanding Trainer. Not only did he set the single-season for number of wins, he was also the leading trainer in North America by earnings. His horses won 81 black-type races, including 19 graded stakes races.

In 2009, Asmussen received his second Eclipse Award after again leading the earnings list and setting a record for number of wins. "It's just been very rewarding to have such an amazing run," he said. "It doesn't feel like proving anything - it's just fun to win."

On March 28, 2013, Asmussen became the second-winningest trainer in North American history with his 6,418th career win behind only Dale Baird, who had 9,445 career wins. Asmussen gave credit to his assistant trainers Scott Blasi, Darren Fleming and Toby Sheets, who allow him to maintain divisions in Arkansas, Louisiana, New York, and Texas.

Asmussen's nomination into American thoroughbred racing's Hall of Fame was removed from the agenda in 2014 because of allegations by PETA he had committed cruelty to animals. Following the conclusion of two state investigations, Asmussen was restored to eligibility for Hall of Fame consideration in 2016, and was inducted into the Hall of Fame that year along with the filly Rachel Alexandra.

Gun Runner was a contender for the American classic races as a three-year-old colt in 2016 and developed into the top older horse of 2017 when he won five of six starts including the Breeders' Cup Classic. He also won the Stephen Foster, Whitney and Woodward.

On May 5, 2018, Asmussen earned his 8,000th win with Lookin At Lee at Churchill Downs. Lookin At Lee had finished second in the Kentucky Derby one year before.

On August 7, 2021, Asmussen surpassed the late Dale Baird to become the leading trainer in North America by wins when Stellar Tap won the fifth race at Saratoga Race Course. The New York Racing Association presented him with a lawn jockey to commemorate the achievement.

On February 20, 2023, at Oaklawn Park, Asmussen earned his 10,000th win with Bet He's Ready in Race five on the card.

== Allegations by PETA ==
In March 2014, Asmussen and his assistant trainer, Scott Blasi, were accused by the People for the Ethical Treatment of Animals (PETA) of subjecting horses to cruel and injurious treatments, administering drugs to them for nontherapeutic purposes, and having a jockey use an electrical device to shock horses into running faster. PETA submitted complaints to the New York State Gaming Commission, the Kentucky Horse Racing Commission and several other local, state and federal agencies. Asmussen told a New Orleans Advocate reporter on March 27 that he had to "...respect the process and show patience." Following this report, the National Museum of Racing and Hall of Fame tabled Asmussen's 2014 Hall of Fame nomination. One of his clients, owner and breeder Ahmed Zayat, moved 12 horses he had placed with Asmussen to other trainers.

On 2014 Kentucky Derby weekend in early May, Asmussen responded to charges in an interview with Bob Costas of NBC. In the interview he denied all accusations, noted that nothing in the PETA video alleged a rule violation or illegal medication use, and stated that assistant Scott Blasi had been fired due to his "disrespectful" comments about Ahmed Zayat. Asmussen said, "Hopefully I do get a chance [to go to court] – and not just to defend myself." In response to a follow-up query from Costas, he acknowledged that it would be possible that he would consider some form of counter-action against PETA. Blasi was rehired by Asmussen several months later.

On May 22, 2014, Blood-Horse magazine reported they had obtained copies of the PETA complaint to the Kentucky Horse Racing Commission and the 22-minute video that was submitted to investigators through a Freedom of Information Act request. The publication noted that while there appeared be no obvious, "smoking gun" violations in the video, it was possible that investigators would later discover something in the footage. However, it was also reported that the earlier, nine-minute video titled "Horse Racing Exposed: Drugs and Death" that PETA released on its web site had been heavily edited. Blood-Horse noted in particular that PETA had moved audio segments, especially of Blasi's outbursts of profanity, to run with completely unrelated video clips.

The Kentucky Horse Racing Commission cleared Asmussen and Blasi on January 15, 2015, based on the results of its investigation into PETA's allegations. The commission found that no Kentucky horse racing rules were violated, and no further action was taken. The Kentucky report stated that the PETA allegations "had neither a factual or scientific basis."

The New York State Gaming Commission reviewed seven hours of video provided by PETA in addition to other investigation, and announced its findings on Asmussen in a 176-page report released on November 23, 2015. Of 14 specific allegations made by PETA, four minor infractions were sustained, three based on illegal use of a synthetic hormone, thyroxine as a feed supplement, and one a paperwork violation—resulting in a $10,000 fine. The remaining "more serious" allegations were dismissed.
