= Wood Memorial Stakes top three finishers =

This is a listing of the horses that finished in either first, second, or third place and the number of starters in the Wood Memorial Stakes, an American Grade 1 race for three-year-olds at 1-1/8 miles on dirt held at Aqueduct Racetrack in Jamaica, New York. (List 1973-present)

Year	Winner	Second	Third	Starters
2025	Rodriguez	Grande	Passion Rules	10
2024	Resilience	Society Man	Protective	12
2023	Lord Miles	Hit Show	Dreamlike	12
2022	Mo Donegal	Early Voting	Skippylongstocking	8
2021	Bourbonic	Dynamic One	Crowded Trade	9
2020	Race Not Held			
2019	Tacitus	Tax	Haikal	11
2018	Vino Rosso	Enticed	Restoring Hope	9
2017	Irish War Cry	Battalion Runner	Cloud Computing	8
2016	Outwork	Trojan Nation	Adventist	8
2015	Frosted	Tencendur	El Kabeir	7
2014	Wicked Strong	Samraat	Social Inclusion	10
2013	Verrazano	Normandy Invasion	Vyjack	9
2012	Gemologist	Alpha	Teeth of the Dog	8
2011	Toby's Corner	Arthur's Tale	Uncle Mo	10
2010	Eskendereya	Jackson Bend	Awesome Act	6
2009	I Want Revenge	West Side Bernie	Just a Coincidence	8
2008	Tale of Ekati	War Pass	Court Vision	9
2007	Nobiz Like Shobiz	Sightseeing	Any Given Saturday	6
2006	Bob and John	Jazil	Keyed Entry	9
2005	Bellamy Road	Survivalist	Scrappy T	7
2004	Tapit	Master David	Eddington	11
2003	Empire Maker	Funny Cide	Kissin Saint	8
2002	Buddha	Medaglia d'Oro	Sunday Break	8
2001	Congaree	Monarchos	Richly Blendid	6
2000	Fusaichi Pegasus	Red Bullet	Aptitude	12
1999	Adonis	Best of Luck	Cliquot	11
1998	Coronado's Quest	Dice Dancer	Parade Ground	11
1997	Captain Bodgit	Accelerator	Smokin Mel	10
1996	Unbridled's Song	In Contention	Romano Gucci	6
1995	Talkin Man	Is Sveikatas	Candy Cone	8
1994	Irgun	Go for Gin	Shiprock	9
1993	Storm Tower	Tossofthecoin	Marked Tree	12
1992	Devil His Due	West by West	Rokeby	12
1991	Cahill Road	Lost Mountain	Happy Jazz Band	10
1990	Thirty Six Red	Burnt Hills	Champagneforashley	10
1989	Easy Goer	Rock Point	Triple Buck	6
1988	Private Terms	Seeking the Gold	Cherokee Colony	10
1987	Gulch	Gone West	Shawklit Won	8
1986	Broad Brush	Mogambo	Groovy	7
1985	Eternal Prince	Proud Truth	Rhoman Rule	6
1984	Leroy S.	Raja's Shark	Bear Hunt	7
1983	Slew o' Gold	Parfaitement	High Honors	7
1983	Bounding Basque	Country Pine	Aztec Red	8
1982	Air Forbes Won	Shimatoree	Laser Light	10
1981	Pleasant Colony	Highland Blade	Cure the Blues	6
1980	Plugged Nickle	Colonel Moran	Genuine Risk	11
1979	Instrument Landing	Screen King	Czaravich	10
1978	Believe It	Darby Creek Road	Track Reward	11
1977	Seattle Slew	Sanhedrin	Catalan	7
1976	Bold Forbes	On the Sly	Sonkisser	7
1975	Foolish Pleasure	Bombay Duck	Media	15
1974	Rube The Great	Friendly Bee	Houston County	11
1974	Flip Sal	Triple Crown	Sharp Gary	11
1973	Angle Light	Sham	Secretariat	8
