= Lone Star Park Handicap =

- Class: Discontinued stakes
- Location: Lone Star Park; Grand Prairie, Texas, United States
- Inaugurated: 1997
- Race type: Thoroughbred - Flat racing
- Website: www.lonestarpark.com

Race information
- Distance: 1 1/16 miles (8.5 furlongs)
- Surface: Dirt
- Track: left-handed
- Qualification: Three-years-old and older
- Weight: Assigned
- Purse: $200,000 (2017)

The Lone Star Park Handicap was a Grade III American Thoroughbred horse race for horses three-years-old and older over a distance 1 1/16 miles on the dirt held annually during the last week of May at Lone Star Park in Grand Prairie, Texas that was last held in 2018.

== History ==
The event was inaugurated in 1997, the year Lone Star Park opened. The event was classified as a Grade III in 2000. In 2001, Dixie Dot Com became the only horse to win in the same year the Lone Star Park Handicap and the Texas Mile Stakes, known as "The Texas Two Step." In 2013, Master Rick accomplished the same feat.

In 2010, Rosie Napravnik became the first female rider to win a graded stakes race in Lone Star Park history.

== Records ==
Speed record:

- 1:40.53 - Dixie Dot Com (2001) (stakes and track record)

Most wins:

- 2 - Mocha Express (1998, 1999)

Most wins by a jockey:

- 2 - Marlon St. Julien (1998, 1999)
- 2 - David Flores (2000, 2001)
- 2 - Garrett Gomez (2007, 2008)

Most wins by a trainer:

- 3 - Bob Baffert (2002, 2007, 2017)

Most wins by an owner:

- 2 - Stronach Stable (2000, 2008)
- 2 - Stonerside Stable (2002, 2007)

== Winners ==
Year	Winner	Age	Jockey	Trainer	Owner	Time	Purse	Grade
2018	Shotgun Kowboy	6	Luis S. Quinonez	C. R. Trout	C. R. Trout	1:44.84	$200,000	III
2017	Danzing Candy	4	Mike E. Smith	Bob Baffert	Halo Farms, J. and D. Bashor	1:43.01	$200,000	III
2016	Cyrus Alexander	4	Martin Garcia	Jerry Hollendorfer	Spendthrift Farm/Stonestreet Stables	1:43.12	$200,000	III
2015	Majestic City	6	Charles C. Lopez	Richard Baltas	Bloom Racing Stable	1:43.31	$200,000	III
2014	Grand Contender	6	Richard E. Eramia	Thomas M. Amoss	Maggi Moss	1:43.83	$200,000	III
2013	Master Rick	4	Ricardo Santana, Jr.	Steven Asmussen	Richard L. Davis	1:42.09	$300,000	III
2012	Nates Mineshaft	4	Donald Edward Simington	Wesley E. Hawley	Orth/Hawley	1:42.91	$300,000	III
2011	Awesome Gem	8	Robby Albarado	Craig Dollase	West Point Thoroughbreds	1:43.48	$300,000	III
2010	Redding Colliery	4	Rosie Napravnik	Kiaran McLaughlin	Mrs. Fitriani Hay.	1:42.13	$300,000	III
2009	It's a Bird	6	Julien Leparoux	Martin D. Wolfson	Edmund A. Gann	1:41.83	$400,000	III
2008	Giant Gizmo	4	Garrett Gomez	Robert J. Frankel	Stronach Stable	1:43.01	$400,000	III
2007	Bob and John	4	Garrett Gomez	Bob Baffert	Stonerside Stable	1:45.02	$400,000	III
2006	Magnum	5	Pat Valenzuela	Darrell Vienna	Herrick Racing LLC	1:42.88	$400,000	III
2005	Supah Blitz	5	Jon Court	Douglas F. O'Neill	Black Saddle Stable et al.	1:41.90	$300,000	III
2004	Yessirgeneralsir	4	Omar Figueroa	Dallas Keen	Jim D. Jackson	1:41.29	$300,000	III
2003	Pie N Burger	5	Jamie Theriot	Cole Norman	Kagele Bros. et al.	1:42.03	$300,000	III
2002	Congaree	4	Pat Day	Bob Baffert	Stonerside Stable	1:42.96	$300,000	III
2001	Dixie Dot Com	6	David Flores	William Morey, Jr.	D. & C. Chaiken/B. & R. Heller	1:40.53	$300,000	III
2000	Luftikus	4	David Flores	Vladimir Cerin	Stronach Stable	1:40.87	$300,000	III
1999	Mocha Express	5	Marlon St. Julien	Tim Harder	Mary Dodd/A. R. Harder	1:43.36	$300,000	
1998	Mocha Express	4	Marlon St. Julien	Tim Harder	A. R. Harder/Don Strate	1:42.17	$200,000	
1997	Connecting Terms	4	Larry Melancon	W. Elliott Walden	Prestonwood Farm	1:41.97	$200,000	
