= Old Hat =

Old hat could refer to:

- The 1972 song "Old Hat" from the album Uncle Dog by the group of the same name
- The 1997 song "Old Hat" from the album Where Have All the Merrymakers Gone? by Harvey Danger
- Old Hat Stakes, an annual horse race in Florida
- Old Hat (horse), a 1960s race horse for which the Old Hat Stakes are named
