= Congaree (horse) =

American-bred Thoroughbred racehorse

- Sire: Arazi
- Grandsire: Blushing Groom
- Dam: Mari's Sheba
- Damsire: Mari's Book
- Sex: Stallion
- Foaled: April 20, 1998
- Died: November 22, 2020 (aged 22)
- Country: United States
- Colour: Chestnut
- Breeder: Stonerside Stable
- Owner: Stonerside Stable
- Trainer: Bob Baffert
- Record: 25: 12-2-4
- Earnings: $3,267,490

Major wins
- Swaps Stakes (2001); Wood Memorial Stakes (2001); Cigar Mile Handicap (2002 & 2003); Del Mar Breeders' Cup Handicap (2002); Lone Star Park Handicap (2002); Carter Handicap (2003); Hollywood Gold Cup (2003); San Antonio Handicap (2003); San Pasqual Handicap (2003); 3rd Kentucky Derby (2001); 3rd Preakness Stakes (2001)

Congaree (April 20, 1998 - November 22, 2020) was an American Thoroughbred racehorse and sire. A multiple Grade I winner and earner of over $3,000,000, Congaree finished third in both the 2001 Kentucky Derby and Preakness Stakes.

== Background ==
Out of the mare Mari's Sheba, a granddaughter of Northern Dancer, his sire was Arazi, the 1991 European Horse of the Year. Mari's Sheba was Gr.I placed during her racing career, finishing third in the 1995 Santa Anita Oaks.

Mari's Sheba also produced Sangaree, a half-brother to Congaree, who was sired by Awesome Again. She also produced Golden Sheba, a filly by Coronado's Quest, who went on to produce multiple Gr.I winning filly Wedding Toast.

== Racing career ==
Trained by future U.S. Racing Hall of Fame inductee, Bob Baffert, Congaree won the April 2001 Wood Memorial Stakes over Monarchos, then finished third behind that rival in the Grade 1 Kentucky Derby while setting a record for the fastest opening mile in Derby history. He also finished third in the Preakness Stakes and did not compete in the 1½ mile Belmont Stakes, opting instead to return to his California home base, where he won the Gr.1 Swaps Stakes at Hollywood Park before returning East for a third-place finish in the Grade 1 Jim Dandy Stakes at Saratoga.

Congaree went on to race very successfully at age four and five, becoming the first horse to win the Grade 1 Cigar Mile Handicap in consecutive years. His time for the 2002 Cigar Mile of 1:33.11 was the fastest mile run in North America in 2002. Starting in 22 consecutive graded stakes races, Congaree won ten graded stakes (including five Grade 1 races) and was an Eclipse Award finalist as Champion Sprinter, Champion Older Male and Horse of the Year.

In 2004, ate age six, Congaree retired after finishing fourth in the Churchill Downs Handicap. He retired with a record of 25: 12-2-4 and earnings of $3,267,490.

== Stud career ==
The stallion began his stud career stood in 2005 at Frank Stronach's Adena Springs in Midway, Kentucky. Adena Springs later moved operations to Paris, Kentucky, where Congaree stood through the 2009 breeding season. Beginning in 2010, Congaree stood at stud at Highcliff Farm in Delanson, New York. In 2013, Congaree was again moved to stand at Mill Creek Farm in New York, where he stayed until Lane's End Farm acquired him to stand at their Texas operation. When Lane's End Texas closed in 2017, Congaree was moved to stand at Valor Farm, also in Texas.

He was owned by Robert and Janice McNair, who bred and raced him in the name of their Stonerside Stable. After selling their Stonerside Stable property in Paris, Kentucky along with the majority of their bloodstock in October 2008, the McNairs began using the stable name Magnolia Racing Stable for their Thoroughbred holdings, which include Congaree, Cowboy Cal, Bob and John, and Stonesider.

Congaree was euthanized on November 22, 2020, due to the infirmities of old age.

=== Progeny ===
Congaree has met with success as a stallion, siring eight stakes winners from his first two crops to race, including multiple Gr.1 winner Jeranimo and multiple Gr. III winner Mythical Power. He has also found international success, siring Irish Gr.III winning mare Maoineach.

Congaree's progeny includes:

- Jeranimo: Winner of the Shoemaker Mile Stakes, Eddie Read Handicap, San Gabriel Handicap (thrice), Oak Tree Mile Stakes, Strub Stakes, and Citation Handicap.
- Don't Tell Sophia: Winner of the Spinster Stakes, Chilukki Stakes, Bayakoa Stakes (twice), Pippin Stakes (twice), and Locust Grove Stakes.
- Killer Graces: Winner of the Hollywood Starlet Stakes, Landaluce Stakes, and Cinderella Stakes.
- Shrinking Violet: Winner of the Monrovia Stakes, Daisycutter Handicap, and Licaghtning City Stakes.
- Mythical Power: Winner of the Lone Star Derby and Texas Mile Stakes.
- Maoineach: Winner of the One Thousand Guineas Trial Stakes (IRE-G3) and Go And Go Round Tower Stakes (IRE-G3)
- Rockin' Rockstar: Winner of the Tom Ridge Stakes
- Conchacer: Winner of the Forward Pass Stakes and Prairie Express Stakes.
