= Fayette Stakes =

- Class: Grade III
- Location: Keeneland Race Course; Lexington, Kentucky, United States
- Inaugurated: 1959 (as Fayette Handicap)
- Race type: Thoroughbred - Flat racing
- Sponsor: Hagyard (since 2013)
- Website: Keeneland

Race information
- Distance: 1 1/8 miles (9 furlongs)
- Surface: Dirt
- Track: left-handed
- Qualification: Three-years-old and older
- Weight: Base weights with allowances: 4-year-olds and up: 125 lbs. 3-year-olds: 122 lbs.
- Purse: $350,000 (since 2022)

The Fayette Stakes is a Grade III American thoroughbred horse race for horses age three and older over a distance of one and one-eighth miles on the dirt held annually in October at Keeneland Race Course in Lexington, Kentucky during the fall meeting. It currently offers a purse of $350,000.

== History ==
The event is named for Fayette County, Kentucky, of which the city of Lexington is the county seat.

The inaugural running of the event was on 24 October 1959, closing day of the Keeneland Fall meeting as the Fayette Handicap. The event attracted some fine handicap horses from Kentucky and around the Midwest. The day the event was held the weather was wet and windy and the track was rated as sloppy. The winner H. Edsall Olson & R. Douglas Prewitt's Terra Firma, was a short 4/5 odds-on favorite after earlier in the month setting a new course record for the 1 1/8 miles distance in the Charles W. Bidwill Memorial Handicap at Hawthorne Race Course in Chicago.

The following year the event was held on opening day of the Keeneland Fall meeting.

In the 1960s the event was won twice by horses that were imported to the United States by Bruno Ferrari. The 1961 longshot winner Zumbador II was the 1960 Uruguayan Triple Crown winner. The 1966 winner Yumbel was the 1965 Horse of the Year and Champion Older Horse in Chile.

In 1963 the distance of the event was decreased to 1 1/16 miles and the winner Choker equaled the track record of 1:41 2/5 winning by two lengths. In 1965 the gallant six-year-old mare Old Hat won by a neck and was later voted as US Champion Older Dirt Female Horse for a second time.

Other fine winners of the event from that era include Thomas F. Devereux's Royal Harmony, who won the event three times straight, 1969–1971. His 1970 victory was noteworthy in that Royal Harmony defeated the 1970 Kentucky Derby winner Dust Commander who was promoted to second after Fast Hilarious was disqualified. The 1972 winner was the only other filly to win the event, Emanuel V. Benjamin III & William G. Clark's Chou Croute. Although Chou Croute was the favorite and won by a neck her outstanding performances during the year landed her US Champion Sprinter honors for 1972.

The event was run in two split divisions in 1976 and 1982.

In 1979 the distance of the event was reverted to the original 1 1/8 miles. The same year the American Graded Stakes Committee upgraded the event to Grade III classification.

The race was contested on turf in 1985 for the only running and was won by 70/1 longshot Wop Wop setting a new course record for the turf distance in 1:51 2/5 winning by 2 1/2 lengths.

In 1987 the event was upgraded to Grade II status and although currently the event hold that status, between 1997 and 2008 the event held a Grade III classification.

In 1992 the conditions of the event were modified to stakes with allowances and the name was subsequently changed to Fayette Stakes.

In 1997 running Universe ridden by Craig Perret broke down early on while tracking leader Whiskey Wisdom causing Preocity to fall hindering the other three runners. Whiskey Wisdom went on to win easily by twelve lengths which remains to date to be the stakes winning margin record.

The distance of the event was increased to 1 3/16 miles in 1998. However, even with Breeders' Cup sponsorship awards the then event was poorly fielded and the distance was reverted to 1 1/8 miles after three runnings of the event.

The event was run on Polytrack from 2006 through 2013.

Other notable winners of this event include 1990 Preakness Stakes winner Summer Squall who won the event in 1991 as the 2/5 odds-on favorite defeating his rival Unbridled by three lengths. One month later Unbridled would meet Summer Squall in the Breeders' Cup Classic at Churchill Downs with Unbridled finishing third and Summer Squall ninth.

The 2009 winner of this event, Blame won his first Graded stakes race in a career that would end with him winning the Breeders' Cup Classic the following year and winning US Champion Older Male Horse honors. Blame's sire and 2012 winner Newsdad's sire Arch won this event setting a new track record for the 1 3/16 miles distance in 1998.

The 2011 winner of this event, Wise Dan displayed his versatility winning on the polytrack surface and later becoming the US Horse of the Year in 2012 and 2013.

In 2025 the event was downgraded by the Thoroughbred Owners and Breeders Association to Grade III status.

== Records ==
Speed record:

- 1 1/8 miles: 1:46.80 - Good Command (1987) & Grand Jewel (1993)
- 1 1/16 miles: 1:41.20 - Silver Series (1978)
- 1 3/16 miles: 1:53.87 - Arch (1998)

Margins

- 12 lengths – Whiskey Wisdom (1997)

Most wins

- 3 - Royal Harmony (1969, 1970, 1971)

Most wins by a jockey

- 5 - Don Brumfield (1978, 1982, 1983, 1987, 1988)

Most wins by a trainer

- 4 - Neil J. Howard (1991, 1993, 2004, 2005)
- 4 - Brad H. Cox (2018, 2022, 2024, 2025)

Most wins by an owner

- 4 - William S. Farish III (1973, 1993, 2004, 2005)

== Winners ==
Year	Winner	Age	Jockey	Trainer	Owner	Distance	Time	Purse	Grade	Ref
Fayette Stakes
2025	Hit Show	5	Irad Ortiz Jr.	Brad H. Cox	Wathnan Racing	1 1/8 miles	1:50.39	$348,750	III	
2024	Hit Show	4	Florent Geroux	Brad H. Cox	Wathnan Racing	1 1/8 miles	1:50.33	$350,000	II	
2023	O'Connor (CHI)	6	Tyler Gaffalione	Saffie A. Joseph Jr.	Michael & Julia C. Iavarone & Fernando Vine Ode	1 1/8 miles	1:50.61	$310,538	II	
2022	West Will Power	5	Joel Rosario	Brad H. Cox	Gary & Mary West	1 1/8 miles	1:50.68	$350,000	II	
2021	Independence Hall	4	Javier Castellano	Michael McCarthy	Eclipse Thoroughbred Partners, Twin Creek Racing Stables, WinStar Farm, Kathleen Verrati & Robert Verrati	1 1/8 miles	1:50.30	$200,000	II	
2020	Mr Freeze	5	Javier Castellano	Dale L. Romans	Jim Bakke & Gerald Isbister	1 1/8 miles	1:50.71	$200,000	II	
2019	Tom's d'Etat	6	Joel Rosario	Albert Stall Jr.	G M B Racing	1 1/8 miles	1:49.17	$200,000	II	
2018	Leofric	5	Florent Geroux	Brad H. Cox	Steve Landers Racing	1 1/8 miles	1:49.87	$200,000	II	
2017	The Player	4	Calvin H. Borel	William B. Bradley	William B. Bradley & Carl Hurst	1 1/8 miles	1:48.16	$200,000	II	
2016	Noble Bird	5	Julien R. Leparoux	Mark E. Casse	John C. Oxley	1 1/8 miles	1:47.75	$200,000	II	
2015	Race Day	4	John R. Velazquez	Todd A. Pletcher	Matthew Schera	1 1/8 miles	1:47.90	$200,000	II	
2014	Pick of the Litter	4	Corey J. Lanerie	Dale L. Romans	Crossed Sabres Farm	1 1/8 miles	1:49.48	$200,000	II	
2013	Nikki's Sandcastle	6	Leandro D. Goncalves	David C. Kassen	Richard Sherman	1 1/8 miles	1:48.13	$200,000	II	
2012	Newsdad	4	Julien R. Leparoux	William I. Mott	James S. Karp	1 1/8 miles	1:48.24	$150,000	II	
2011	Wise Dan	4	Julien R. Leparoux	Charles LoPresti	Morton Fink	1 1/8 miles	1:48.72	$150,000	II	
2010	Successful Dan	4	Julien R. Leparoux	Charles LoPresti	Morton Fink	1 1/8 miles	1:47.09	$150,000	II	
2009	Blame	3	Jamie Theriot	Albert Stall Jr.	Claiborne Farm & Adele B. Dilschneider	1 1/8 miles	1:50.54	$150,000	II	
2008	Ball Four	7	Julio A. Garcia	Derek Galvin	Michael Tabor & Derrick Smith	1 1/8 miles	1:48.37	$150,000	III	
2007	Go Between	4	Miguel Mena	William I. Mott	Peter Vegso	1 1/8 miles	1:47.97	$150,000	III	
2006	Eccentric (GB)	5	Eddie Castro	Roger L. Attfield	Gary A. Tanaka	1 1/8 miles	1:49.16	$150,000	III	
2005	Alumni Hall	6	Calvin H. Borel	Neil J. Howard	William S. Farish III, James Elkins & W. Temple Webber Jr.	1 1/8 miles	1:51.37	$150,000	III	
2004	Midway Road	4	Calvin H. Borel	Neil J. Howard	William S. Farish III	1 1/8 miles	1:50.39	$161,250	III	
2003	M B Sea	4	Craig Perret	Dale L. Romans	Michael J. Bruder	1 1/8 miles	1:50.30	$163,800	III	
2002	Tenpins	4	Craig Perret	Donald R. Winfree	Joseph Vitello	1 1/8 miles	1:51.17	$156,122	III	
2001	Connected	4	Marlon St. Julien	David M. Carroll	Helen Alexander & Helen K. Groves Revocable Trust	1 1/8 miles	1:50.05	$166,950	III	
2000	Jadada	5	Shane Sellers	Mitch Shirota	Sterling Stud	1 3/16 miles	1:54.92	$214,800	III	
1999	Social Charter	4	Marlon St. Julien	Patrick B. Byrne	Stonerside Stable & Robert E. Sangster	1 3/16 miles	1:55.28	$212,624	III	
1998	Arch	3	Shane Sellers	Frank L. Brothers	Claiborne Farm & Adele B. Dilschneider	1 3/16 miles	1:53.87	$153,939	III	
1997	Whiskey Wisdom	4	Willie Martinez	Roger L. Attfield	Kinghaven Farms	1 1/8 miles	1:48.64	$158,304	III	
1996	Isitingood	5	David R. Flores	Bob Baffert	Michael E. Pegram & Terry Henn	1 1/8 miles	1:50.42	$193,725	II	
1995	Judge T C	4	Joe M. Johnson	Gary G. Hartlage	Bea & Robert H. Roberts	1 1/8 miles	1:49.05	$168,750	II	
1994	Sunny Sunrise	7	Jeffrey D. Carle	Bud Delp	Harry Meyerhoff	1 1/8 miles	1:50.18	$109,300	II	
1993	Grand Jewel	3	Jerry D. Bailey	Neil J. Howard	William S. Farish III & William S. Kilroy	1 1/8 miles	1:46.87	$110,700	II	
1992	Barkerville	4	Shane Sellers	Frank L. Brothers	Don Millar	1 1/8 miles	1:48.43	$114,000	II	
Fayette Handicap
1991	Summer Squall	4	Pat Day	Neil J. Howard	Dogwood Stable	1 1/8 miles	1:48.84	$107,400	II	
1990	Lac Ouimet	7	Randy Romero	Thomas J. Skiffington	Virginia Kraft Payson	1 1/8 miles	1:47.20	$108,050	II	
1989	Drapeau Tricolore	4	James E. Bruin	D. Wayne Lukas	Wildenstein Stable	1 1/8 miles	1:48.20	$110,300	II	
1988	Homebuilder	4	Don Brumfield	Woodford C. Stephens	Ryehill Farm (Jim & Eleanor Ryan)	1 1/8 miles	1:51.20	$105,100	II	
1987	Good Command	4	Don Brumfield	Gary F. Jones	Prestonwood Farm	1 1/8 miles	1:46.80	$113,725	II	
1986	Harham's Sizzler	7	Randall A. Meier	Louis M. Goldfine	Harold M. Florsheim	1 1/8 miles	1:49.20	$58,525	III	
1985	Wop Wop	3	Darrell Ellis Foster	John T. Ward Jr.	Abner C. Hiler Jr.	1 1/8 miles	1:51.40	$56,200	III	
1984	Star Choice	5	James McKnight	Carl A. Nafzger	Frances A. Genter	1 1/8 miles	1:47.40	$56,400	III	
1983	Cad	5	Don Brumfield	David C. Kassen	Ted Smith & Bill Marko	1 1/8 miles	1:48.80	$53,325	III	Dead heat
1983	Frost King	5	Robin Platts	William Marko	Double Eagle Stable	1 1/8 miles	1:48.80	$53,325	III	Dead heat
1982	Rivalero	3	Randy Romero	Frank Y. Whiteley Jr.	Joe W. & Dorothy D. Brown	1 1/8 miles	1:50.20	$56,862	III	Division 1
1982	El Baba	6	Don Brumfield	Dewey P. Smith	Calumet Farm	1 1/8 miles	1:50.40	$59,212	III	Division 2
1981	Ironworks	3	Pat Day	Charles R. Werstler	Dixiana Stable	1 1/8 miles	1:49.20	$63,250	III	
1980	Hurry Up Blue	3	Gerland Gallitano	Joseph M. Bollero	Russell L. Reineman	1 1/8 miles	1:49.00	$59,000	III	
1979	Architect	3	Stanley Spencer	Harvey L. Vanier	Carl Lauer	1 1/8 miles	1:49.60	$56,375	III	
1978	†Silver Series	4	Don Brumfield	Peter M. Howe	Pillar Farm	1 1/16 miles	1:41.20	$31,950		
1977	Bob's Dusty	3	Richard dePass	William E. Adams	Robert N. Lehmann	1 1/16 miles	1:42.80	$28,300		
1976	Silver Badge	5	Garth Patterson	George T. Poole	Cornelius Vanderbilt Whitney	1 1/16 miles	1:44.60	$27,662		Division 1
1976	§Yamanin	4	Garth Patterson	George T. Poole	Hajime Doi	1 1/16 miles	1:43.20	$27,537		Division 2
1975	Warbucks	5	Jimmy Nichols	Don Combs	Edward E. Elzemeyer	1 1/16 miles	1:44.40	$28,200		
1974	Jesta Dream Away	4	Anthony Rini	James E. Morgan	George A. Zimmerman & Edwin J. Zwiesler	1 1/16 miles	1:41.60	$27,875		
1973	§Chateauvira	5	Gerland Gallitano	Del W. Carroll	William S. Farish III	1 1/16 miles	1:42.80	$29,375		
1972	ƒChou Croute	4	John L. Rotz	Bob G. Dunham	Emanuel V. Benjamin III & William G. Clark	1 1/16 miles	1:44.00	$29,075		
1971	Royal Harmony	7	David E. Whited	Pat B. Devereux Sr.	Thomas F. Devereux	1 1/16 miles	1:42.60	$29,850		
1970	Royal Harmony	6	Earl J. Knapp	Pat B. Devereux Sr.	Thomas F. Devereux	1 1/16 miles	1:42.80	$27,425		
1969	Royal Harmony	5	Mickey Solomone	Pat B. Devereux Sr.	Thomas F. Devereux	1 1/16 miles	1:42.60	$28,550		
1968	Yorkville	4	David E. Whited	John M. Hart	Edward J. Grosfield	1 1/16 miles	1:42.00	$28,250		
1967	Swoonaway	6	Billy Phelps	S. Bryant Ott	E. Gay Drake	1 1/16 miles	1:42.60	$29,250		
1966	Yumbel (CHI)	5	Hector Pilar	Albert Filicomo	Walnut Hill Farm (Bruno Ferrari)	1 1/16 miles	1:43.60	$28,500		
1965	ƒOld Hat	6	Robert Gallimore	Charles C. Norman	Stanley Conrad	1 1/16 miles	1:42.80	$28,200		
1964	Swoonen	4	Kenny Knapp	Willard L. Proctor	J. Graham Brown	1 1/16 miles	1:42.00	$28,600		
1963	Choker	3	Kenneth Church	Joe Kramer	Louis Lee Haggin II	1 1/16 miles	1:41.40	$18,100		
1962	Blue Croon	4	Norman Cox	Douglas Davis Jr.	W. Richard Henderson	1 1/8 miles	1:48.80	$17,350		
1961	Zumbador II (URU)	4	Ray Broussard	Leo Sierra	Bruno Ferrari	1 1/8 miles	1:47.60	$16,750		
1960	§Little Fitz	5	William A. Peake	Robert C. Steele	John C. Hauer	1 1/8 miles	1:49.60	$17,700		
1959	Terra Firma	4	Kenneth Church	R. Douglas Prewitt	H. Edsall Olson & R. Douglas Prewitt	1 1/8 miles	1:51.40	$17,100		

Legend:
Dirt All Weather Track Turf
Notes:
§ Ran as an entry
ƒ Filly or Mare
† In the 1978 running of the event 1978 Buckfinder finished first but was disqualified for impeding Silver Series in the stretch run and set back to second.

== See also ==
List of American and Canadian Graded races
