= Marlon St. Julien =

Personal information
- Born: February 13, 1972 (age 54) Lafayette, Louisiana, United States
- Occupation: Jockey
- Spouse: Brenda St. Julien
- Children: Jasmine St. Julien, Blaise St. Julien, Even St. Julien

Horse racing career
- Sport: Horse racing
- Career wins: 2,500+

Major racing wins
- Lone Star Park Handicap (1998, 1999); Fayette Stakes (1999, 2001); Selene Stakes (2000); Arlington-Washington Lassie Stakes (2001); Pocahontas Stakes (2001); Arlington Sprint Handicap (2001)

Racing awards
- Leading rider at Delta Downs (1993, 1994); Leading rider at Lone Star Park (1998); Leading rider at Kentucky Downs (1999)

Significant horses
- Mocha Express

Marlon St. Julien (born February 13, 1972, in Lafayette, Louisiana) is an American equestrian professional in Thoroughbred horse racing. In 2000, he became the first African-American jockey to ride in the Kentucky Derby in 79 years, when he rode Curule to a seventh-place finish.

St. Julien began his professional riding career in 1989 at Evangeline Downs where he won his first race. He was the leading jockey at Delta Downs in 1993 and 1994, at Lone Star Park in 1998, and at Kentucky Downs in 1999.

As part of Black History Month, ABC Sports broadcast Raising the Roof: Seven Athletes for the 21st Century which aired February 5, 2000, and featured Marlon St. Julien and six other American athletes, including Tiger Woods and Venus & Serena Williams. The program won the 2000 Media Eclipse Award for National Television - Features.

In 2018, St. Julien undertook many severe injuries after falling from a horse at an Iowa racetrack. St. Julien was in the intensive care unit for many days after he had spinal surgery. In 2021, St. Julien became an agent, putting an end to time riding horses, due to his long-term injuries from his 2018 incident.

== Year-end charts ==
Chart (2000–present)	Peak position
National Earnings List for Jockeys 2000	34
National Earnings List for Jockeys 2001	82
