= Wood Memorial Stakes =

Grade II flat thoroughbred horse race

- Class: Grade II
- Location: Aqueduct Racetrack; Ozone Park, Queens, New York
- Inaugurated: 1925
- Race type: Thoroughbred – Flat racing

Race information
- Distance: 1 1/8 miles (9 furlongs)
- Surface: Dirt
- Track: Left-handed
- Qualification: Three-year-olds
- Weight: 123 lbs (55.8 kg)
- Purse: $750,000

The Wood Memorial Stakes is an American flat Thoroughbred horse race for three-year-olds held annually in April at Aqueduct Racetrack in Ozone Park, Queens, New York. It is run over a distance of 1 1/8 miles (9 furlongs) on dirt. The Wood Memorial has been run as a Grade II event since 2017. It was a Grade I race from 1974 (when grading was first introduced) to 1994 and again from 2002 to 2016.

The Wood Memorial is one of the major prep races on the Road to the Kentucky Derby. Between 1930 and 2000, eleven winners of the Wood Memorial went on to win the Kentucky Derby (Gallant Fox, Twenty Grand, Johnstown, Count Fleet, Hoop Jr., Assault, Foolish Pleasure, Bold Forbes, Seattle Slew, Pleasant Colony and Fusaichi Pegasus). Four of them also won the Triple Crown. The most famous loser in the Wood Memorial was Secretariat, who finished third in 1973.

The winner of the Wood Memorial has not won the Kentucky Derby since 2000, in part because several became injured in the weeks between the two races. For example, Toby's Corner missed the Derby with lameness in his left hind leg (2011), Eskendereya with a soft tissue injury in his left front leg (2010), I Want Revenge with a ligament injury to his right front ankle (2009) and Buddha with separation of the hoof wall from the laminae of his left front leg (2002). In 2025, both the winner Rodriguez and runner-up Grande were scratched from the Kentucky Derby with foot bruises.

The race was named to honor Eugene D. Wood, a New York State politician and horse racing enthusiast who had been a founder and past president of the old Jamaica Race Course where the race was run until 1960.

From 1925 to 1939, the Wood Memorial was run over a distance of one mile and seventy yards, then at 1 1/16 miles from 1940 to 1951, after which it was changed to its present 1 1/8 miles. All entrants currently carry a weight of 123 lb.

The race was run in two divisions in 1944, 1945, 1947, 1974, and 1983.

== Records ==
In 2005, Bellamy Road set a new stakes record of 1:47.16 at the 1 1/8 mile distance in winning by 17 1/2 lengths for his owner, George Steinbrenner.

Most wins by a jockey:

- 9 – Eddie Arcaro (1944, 1945, 1947 (2), 1949, 1950, 1956, 1957, 1958)

Most wins by a trainer:

- 8 – "Sunny Jim" Fitzsimmons (1928, 1930, 1936, 1937, 1938, 1939, 1955, 1957)

Most wins by an owner:

- 4 – Greentree Stable (1927, 1931, 1944, 1963)
- 4 – Wheatley Stable (1928, 1936, 1937, 1957)
- 4 – Belair Stable (1930, 1938, 1939, 1955)
- 4 – Cornelius Vanderbilt Whitney (1935, 1945, 1947, 1956)

== Winners ==
Year	Winner	Jockey	Trainer	Owner	Dist. (Miles)	Time	Win$	Gr.
2026	Albus	Jamie Torres	Riley Mott	Pin Oak Stud LLC.	11/8 m	1:51.71	$400,000	G2
2025	Rodriguez	Mike E. Smith	Bob Baffert	SF Racing, Starlight Racing, Madaket Stables, Stonestreet Stables, Dianne Bashor, Determined Stables, Robert E. Masterson, Tom J. Ryan, Waves Edge Capital & Catherine Donovan	11/8 m	1:48.15	$400,000	G2
2024	Resilience	John R. Velazquez	William I. Mott	Emily Bushnell & Ric Waldman	11/8 m	1:50.28	$400,000	G2
2023	Lord Miles	Paco Lopez	Saffie A. Joseph Jr.	Vegso Racing Stable	11/8 m	1:51.17	$400,000	G2
2022	Mo Donegal	Joel Rosario	Todd A. Pletcher	Donegal Racing	11/8 m	1:47.96	$400,000	G2
2021	Bourbonic	Kendrick Carmouche	Todd A. Pletcher	Calumet Farm	11/8 m	1:54.49	$400,000	G2
2020	No Race							
2019	Tacitus	José Ortiz	William I. Mott	Juddmonte Farms Inc.	11/8 m	1:51.23	$400,000	G2
2018	Vino Rosso	John R. Velazquez	Todd A. Pletcher	Repole Stable & St. Elias Stable	11/8 m	1:49.79	$535,000	G2
2017	Irish War Cry	Rajiv Maragh	H. Graham Motion	Isabelle de Tomaso	11/8 m	1:50.91	$400,000	G2
2016	Outwork	John R. Velazquez	Todd A. Pletcher	Repole Stable	11/8 m	1:52.92	$590,000	G1
2015	Frosted	Joel Rosario	Kiaran McLaughlin	Godolphin Racing	11/8 m	1:50.31	$590,000	G1
2014	Wicked Strong	Rajiv Maragh	James Jerkens	Centennial Farms	11/8 m	1:49.31	$590,000	G1
2013	Verrazano	John R. Velazquez	Todd A. Pletcher	Let's Go Stables	11/8 m	1:50.27	$600,000	G1
2012	Gemologist	Javier Castellano	Todd A. Pletcher	WinStar Farm	11/8 m	1:50.96	$600,000	G1
2011	Toby's Corner	Eddie Castro	H. Graham Motion	Dianne Cotter	11/8 m	1:49.93	$600,000	G1
2010	Eskendereya	John R. Velazquez	Todd A. Pletcher	Zayat Stables	11/8 m	1:49.97	$450,000	G1
2009	I Want Revenge	Joseph Talamo	Jeff Mullins	David J. Lanzman & IEAH Stables	11/8 m	1:49.49	$450,000	G1
2008	Tale of Ekati	Edgar Prado	Barclay Tagg	Charles E. Fipke	11/8 m	1:52.35	$450,000	G1
2007	Nobiz Like Shobiz	Cornelio Velásquez	Barclay Tagg	Elizabeth J. Valando	11/8 m	1:49.46	$450,000	G1
2006	Bob and John	Garrett Gomez	Bob Baffert	Stonerside Stable	11/8 m	1:51.54	$450,000	G1
2005	Bellamy Road	Javier Castellano	Nick Zito	Kinsman Stable	11/8 m	1:47.16	$450,000	G1
2004	Tapit	Ramon A. Dominguez	Michael W. Dickinson	Ronald Winchell	11/8 m	1:49.60	$450,000	G1
2003	Empire Maker	Jerry Bailey	Robert J. Frankel	Juddmonte Farms	11/8 m	1:48.60	$450,000	G1
2002	Buddha	Pat Day	H. James Bond	Gary & Mary West	11/8 m	1:48.60	$450,000	G1
2001	Congaree	Victor Espinoza	Bob Baffert	Stonerside Stable	11/8 m	1:47.80	$450,000	G2
2000	Fusaichi Pegasus	Kent Desormeaux	Neil D. Drysdale	Fusao Sekiguchi	11/8 m	1:47.80	$450,000	G2
1999	Adonis	Jorge Chavez	Nick Zito	Paraneck Stable	11/8 m	1:47.60	$360,000	G2
1998	Coronado's Quest	Robbie Davis	Claude R. McGaughey III	Stuart S. Janney III	11/8 m	1:47.40	$300,000	G2
1997	Captain Bodgit	Alex Solis	Gary Capuano	Team Valor	11/8 m	1:48.20	$300,000	G2
1996	Unbridled's Song	Mike E. Smith	James T. Ryerson	Paraneck Stable	11/8 m	1:49.80	$300,000	G2
1995	Talkin Man	Shane Sellers	Roger Attfield	Kinghaven Farms	11/8 m	1:49.20	$300,000	G2
1994	Irgun	Gary Stevens	Steven W. Young	Brandon & Marianne Chase	11/8 m	1:49.00	$300,000	G1
1993	Storm Tower	Rick Wilson	Benjamin W. Perkins Jr.	Char-Mari Stable	11/8 m	1:48.40	$300,000	G1
1992	Devil His Due	Mike E. Smith	H. Allen Jerkens	Lion Crest Stable	11/8 m	1:49.20	$300,000	G1
1991	Cahill Road	Craig Perret	Scotty Schulhofer	Frances A. Genter	11/8 m	1:48.40	$300,000	G1
1990	Thirty Six Red	Mike E. Smith	Nick Zito	B. Giles Brophy	11/8 m	1:50.40	$362,400	G1
1989	Easy Goer	Pat Day	Claude R. McGaughey III	Ogden Phipps	11/8 m	1:50.60	$340,800	G1
1988	Private Terms	Chris Antley	Charles Hadry	Locust Hill Farm	11/8 m	1:47.20	$359,400	G1
1987	Gulch	José A. Santos	LeRoy Jolley	Peter M. Brant	11/8 m	1:49.00	$354,300	G1
1986	Broad Brush	Vincent Bracciale Jr.	Richard W. Small	Robert E. Meyerhoff	11/8 m	1:50.60	$178,500	G1
1985	Eternal Prince	Richard Migliore	John J. Lenzini Jr.	Brian J. Hurst	11/8 m	1:48.80	$177,900	G1
1984	Leroy S.	Jean Cruguet	Jan Nerud	John A. Nerud	11/8 m	1:51.40	$180,000	G1
1983-2	Bounding Basque	Gregg McCarron	Woody Sedlacek	Jacques Wimpfheimer	11/8 m	1:51.00	$100,980	G1
1983-1	Slew o' Gold	Eddie Maple	Sidney Watters Jr.	Equusequity Stable	11/8 m	1:51.40	$101,700	G1
1982	Air Forbes Won	Ángel Cordero Jr.	Frank LaBoccetta	Edward Anchel	11/8 m	1:51.00	$105,120	G1
1981	Pleasant Colony	Jeffrey Fell	John P. Campo	Buckland Farm	11/8 m	1:49.60	$98,280	G1
1980	Plugged Nickle	Buck Thornburg	Thomas J. Kelly	John M. Schiff	11/8 m	1:50.80	$87,300	G1
1979	Instrument Landing	Ángel Cordero Jr.	David A. Whiteley	Pen-Y-Bryn Farm	11/8 m	1:49.20	$85,650	G1
1978	Believe It	Eddie Maple	Woody Stephens	Hickory Tree Stable	11/8 m	1:49.80	$65,490	G1
1977	Seattle Slew	Jean Cruguet	William H. Turner Jr.	Karen L. Taylor	11/8 m	1:49.60	$66,180	G2
1976	Bold Forbes	Ángel Cordero Jr.	Laz Barrera	E. Rodriguez Tizol	11/8 m	1:47.40	$67,560	G1
1975	Foolish Pleasure	Jacinto Vásquez	LeRoy Jolley	John L. Greer	11/8 m	1:48.80	$72,840	G1
1974-2	Rube The Great	Miguel A. Rivera	Pancho Martin	Sigmund Sommer	11/8 m	1:49.60	$69,660	G1
1974-1	Flip Sal	Ángel Cordero Jr.	Stephen A. DiMauro	Salvatore Tufano	11/8 m	1:51.40	$69,360	G1
1973	Angle Light	Jacinto Vásquez	Lucien Laurin	Edwin Whittaker	11/8 m	1:49.80	$68,940	G1
1972	Upper Case	Ron Turcotte	Lucien Laurin	Meadow Stable	11/8 m	1:49.00	$71,040	
1971	Good Behaving	Chuck Baltazar	John P. Campo	Neil Hellman	11/8 m	1:49.80	$67,320	
1970	Personality	Eddie Belmonte	John W. Jacobs	Ethel D. Jacobs	11/8 m	1:49.40	$76,570	
1969	Dike	Jorge Velásquez	Lucien Laurin	Claiborne Farm	11/8 m	1:49.60	$72,085	
1968	Dancer's Image	Bobby Ussery	Lou Cavalaris Jr.	Peter D. Fuller	11/8 m	1:49.00	$73,775	
1967	Damascus	Bill Shoemaker	Frank Y. Whiteley Jr.	Edith W. Bancroft	11/8 m	1:49.60	$73,060	
1966	Amberoid	William Boland	Lucien Laurin	Reginald N. Webster	11/8 m	1:49.60	$74,425	
1965	Flag Raiser	Bobby Ussery	Hirsch Jacobs	Isidor Bieber	11/8 m	1:50.20	$60,222	
1964	Quadrangle	Bill Hartack	J. Elliott Burch	Rokeby Stable	11/8 m	1:50.20	$58,013	
1963	No Robbery	John L. Rotz	John M. Gaver Sr.	Greentree Stable	11/8 m	1:49.20	$59,020	
1962	Admiral's Voyage	Braulio Baeza	Charles R. Parke	Fred W. Hooper	11/8 m	1:49.20	$59,703	
1961	Globemaster	John L. Rotz	Thomas J. Kelly	Leonard P. Sasso	11/8 m	1:50.20	$56,062	
1960	Francis S.	Bill Shoemaker	Burley Parke	Harbor View Farm	11/8 m	1:50.20	$60,465	
1959	Manassa Mauler	Ray Broussard	Pancho Martin	Emil Dolce	11/8 m	1:49.60	$55,915	
1958	Jewel's Reward	Eddie Arcaro	Ivan H. Parke	Maine Chance Farm	11/8 m	1:50.20	$37,575	
1957	Bold Ruler	Eddie Arcaro	Jim Fitzsimmons	Wheatley Stable	11/8 m	1:48.80	$40,800	
1956	Head Man	Eddie Arcaro	Sylvester Veitch	Cornelius V. Whitney	11/8 m	1:50.20	$42,400	
1955	Nashua	Ted Atkinson	Jim Fitzsimmons	Belair Stud	11/8 m	1:50.60	$75,100	
1954	Correlation	Bill Shoemaker	Noble Threewitt	Robert S. Lytle	11/8 m	1:50.00	$86,000	
1953	Native Dancer	Eric Guerin	William C. Winfrey	Alfred G. Vanderbilt II	11/8 m	1:50.60	$87,000	
1952	Master Fiddle	Dave Gorman	Sol Rutchick	Myhelen Stable	11/8 m	1:52.40	$45,200	
1951	Repetoire	Pete McLean	Albert Jensen	Nora A. Mikell	11/16 m	1:44.40	$35,250	
1950	Hill Prince	Eddie Arcaro	Casey Hayes	Christopher Chenery	11/16 m	1:43.60	$34,500	
1949	Olympia	Eddie Arcaro	Ivan H. Parke	Fred W. Hooper	11/16 m	1:45.00	$31,850	
1948	My Request	Douglas Dodson	James P. Conway	Florence Whitaker	11/16 m	1:46.20	$34,600	
1947-2	Phalanx	Eddie Arcaro	Sylvester Veitch	Cornelis V. Whitney	11/16 m	1:43.80	$31,325	
1947-1	I Will	Eddie Arcaro	Sidney Jacobs	Jaclyn Stable	11/16 m	1:45.00	$31,625	
1946	Assault	Warren Mehrtens	Max Hirsch	King Ranch	11/16 m	1:46.60	$22,600	
1945-2	Jeep	Arnold Kirkland	Lydell T. Ruff	Cornelius V. Whitney	11/16 m	1:45.80	$18,945	
1945-1	Hoop Jr.	Eddie Arcaro	Ivan H. Parke	Fred W. Hooper	11/16 m	1:45.00	$18,945	
1944-2	Lucky Draw	Johnny Longden	Bert Mulholland	George D. Widener Jr.	11/16 m	1:46.20	$20,115	
1944-1	Stir Up	Eddie Arcaro	John M. Gaver Sr.	Greentree Stable	11/16 m	1:44.20	$19,625	
1943	Count Fleet	Johnny Longden	Don Cameron	Fannie Hertz	11/16 m	1:43.00	$20,150	
1942	Requested	Wayne D. Wright	Blackie McCoole	Florence Whitaker	11/16 m	1:45.20	$22,900	
1941	Market Wise	Don Meade	George W. Carroll	Louis Tufano	11/16 m	1:45.60	$16,650	
1940	Dit	Leon Haas	Max Hirsch	W. Arnold Hanger	11/16 m	1:45.80	$19,225	
1939	Johnstown	James Stout	Jim Fitzsimmons	Belair Stud	1m, 70 yds	1:42.00	$17,675	
1938	Fighting Fox	James Stout	Jim Fitzsimmons	Belair Stud	1m, 70 yds	1:43.00	$17,450	
1937	Melodist	Johnny Longden	Jim Fitzsimmons	Wheatley Stable	1m, 70 yds	1:42.80	$19,150	
1936	Teufel	Eddie Litzenberger	Jim Fitzsimmons	Wheatley Stable	1m, 70 yds	1:43.20	$10,775	
1935	Today	Raymond Workman	Thomas J. Healey	Cornelius V. Whitney	1m, 70 yds	1:42.80	$11,350	
1934	High Quest	Dominick Bellizzi	Robert A. Smith	Brookmeade Stable	1m, 70 yds	1:43.80	$3,990	
1933	Mr. Khayyam	Pete Walls	Matthew P. Brady	Catawba Farm (Madelaine H. Austin)	1m, 70 yds	1:42.60	$3,760	
1932	Universe	Linus McAtee	Joseph Bauer	Thomas M. Cassidy	1m, 70 yds	1:43.00	$10,400	
1931	Twenty Grand	Charley Kurtsinger	James G. Rowe Jr.	Greentree Stable	1m, 70 yds	1:42.60	$10,200	
1930	Gallant Fox	Earl Sande	Jim Fitzsimmons	Belair Stud	1m, 70 yds	1:43.60	$10,150	
1929	Essare	Mack Garner	Joe Johnson	Jacques Stable	1m, 70 yds	1:44.00	$11,000	
1928	Distraction	Danny McAuliffe	Sunny Jim Fitzsimmons	Wheatley Stable	1m, 70 yds	1:46.00	$11,300	
1927	Saxon	George Ellis	James G. Rowe Sr.	Greentree Stable	1m, 70 yds	1:43.60	$9,005	
1926	Pompey	Bennie Breuning	William H. Karrick	William R. Coe	1m, 70 yds	1:42.00	$8,700	
1925	Backbone	Ivan H. Parke	James G. Rowe Sr.	Harry Payne Whitney	1m, 70 yds	1:43.40	$7,600	

Notes:

1. In 1956, Golf Ace won but was disqualified and placed 2nd.
2. In 1962, Admiral's Voyage and Sunrise County finished in a dead heat. However, Sunrise County, was disqualified and placed 2nd.
3. Leroy S. (1984), Cahill Road (1991), Irgun (1994), Coronado's Quest (1998), Buddha (2002), I Want Revenge (2009), Eskendereya (2010), Toby's Corner (2011), and Lord Miles (2023) are recent horses to win the Wood Memorial Stakes, but not run in the Kentucky Derby.

== See also ==
- Wood Memorial Stakes "top three finishers" and starters
