= Bob and John =

American-bred Thoroughbred racehorse

- Sire: Seeking The Gold
- Grandsire: Mr. Prospector
- Dam: Minister's Melody
- Damsire: Deputy Minister
- Sex: Stallion
- Foaled: 2003
- Died: December 10, 2018
- Country: United States
- Colour: Bay
- Breeder: Stonerside Stable
- Owner: Stonerside Stable
- Trainer: Bob Baffert
- Record: 14: 5-3-3
- Earnings: US$996,330

Major wins
- Sham Stakes (2006); Wood Memorial Stakes (2006); Lone Star Park Handicap (2007)

Bob and John (foaled May 17, 2003, in Kentucky; died December 10, 2018, on Jeju Island, South Korea) was an American thoroughbred racehorse. He was the son of Seeking The Gold out of the mare Minister's Melody. His sire is a son of Mr. Prospector and his dam is from Deputy Minister. Bob and John was bred and raced by Stonerside Stable. He was trained by Bob Baffert and ridden by Garrett Gomez.

As a three-year-old, Bob and John was a top contender for the Kentucky Derby after winning the Sham and Wood Memorial Stakes, beating Jazil in the latter. He finished seventeenth in the Derby and eighth in the Belmont Stakes. Raced at age four in 2007, his best result was a win in the Grade III Lone Star Park Handicap.

Bob and John was retired from racing in August 2007 to stand at Pin Oak Stud near Versailles, Kentucky, but died on December 10, 2018, at Isidore Farm on the South Korean Jeju Island.

== Races ==
| Finish | Race | Distance | Track | Condition |
| 1st | Lone Star Park Handicap | One and One-Sixteenth Miles | Lone Star Park | Fast |
| 2nd | Texas Mile Stakes | One Mile | Lone Star Park | Fast |
| 2nd | El Cajon Stakes | One Mile | Del Mar Racetrack | Fast |
| 8th | Belmont Stakes | One and One-Half | Belmont Park | Fast |
| 17th | Kentucky Derby | One and One-Quarter Miles | Churchill Downs | Fast |
| 1st | Wood Memorial Stakes | One and One-Eighth Miles | Aqueduct Racetrack | Sloppy (Sealed) |
| 3rd | San Felipe Stakes | One and One-Sixteenth Miles | Santa Anita Park | Fast |
| 1st | Sham Stakes | One and One-Eighth Miles | Santa Anita Park | Fast |
| 1st | Allowance | One and One-Sixteenth Miles | Santa Anita Park | Fast |
| 3rd | Hollywood Futurity | One and One-Sixteenth Miles | Hollywood Park Racetrack | Fast |
| 3rd (DQ from 1st) | Real Quiet Stakes | One and One-Sixteenth Miles | Hollywood Park Racetrack | Fast |
| 2nd | Allowance | One Mile | Oak Tree at Santa Anita Park | Fast |
| 1st | Maiden | One Mile | Del Mar Racetrack | Fast |
| 4th | Maiden | Six Furlongs | Del Mar Racetrack | Fast |
