= Cigar Mile Handicap =

Horse race in New York, U.S.

- Class: Grade II
- Location: Aqueduct Racetrack; Queens, New York, United States
- Inaugurated: 1988 (as NYRA Mile Handicap)
- Race type: Thoroughbred – Flat racing
- Sponsor: NYRA Bets (2021)
- Website: NYRA

Race information
- Distance: 1 mile (8 furlongs)
- Surface: Dirt
- Track: left-handed
- Qualification: Three years old and older
- Weight: Assigned
- Purse: $500,000 (since 2023)

The Cigar Mile Handicap is a Grade II American thoroughbred horse race for horses aged three-years-old and older over a distance of one mile and is held in late November or early December at Aqueduct Racetrack in Queens, New York. The event carries a purse of $500,000.

== History ==
The inaugural running of the event, then known as the NYRA Mile Handicap or simply the NYRA Mile, was won in 1988 by three-year-old Forty Niner, who would later become an influential sire. The race was eligible for graded stakes classification in 1990 and was awarded Grade I status by the American Graded Stakes Committee.

The 1994 NYRA Mile was the second race in the 16-race win streak of Cigar, who won by seven lengths. The event was renamed in 1997 following Cigar's retirement to the Cigar Mile Handicap. Horses who have won the Cigar Mile on their way to championship honors include 2006 winner Discreet Cat (named one of the year's champion three-year-olds in the World's Best Racehorse Rankings), 2009 winner Kodiak Kowboy (winner of that year's Eclipse Award for Champion Sprinter), and 2019 victor Maximum Security (that year's Eclipse winner for Best Three-Year-Old Male).

In 2023 the event was downgraded by the Thoroughbred Owners and Breeders Association to Grade II status.

== Records ==
Speed record:

- 1:32.46 – Discreet Cat (2006)

Margins:

- 7 lengths – Cigar (1994)

Most wins:

- 2 – Congaree (2002, 2003)

Most wins by a jockey:

- 5 – Jerry Bailey (1994, 1998, 2000, 2002, 2003)
- 5 – John R. Velazquez (2001, 2015, 2022, 2023, 2024)

Most wins by a trainer:

- 7 – Todd A. Pletcher (2001, 2004, 2005, 2012, 2021, 2022, 2024)

Most wins by an owner:

- 2 – Michael B. Tabor (2001, 2004)
- 2 – Stonerside Stable (2002, 2003)
- 2 – Charles E. Fipke (2008, 2010)

== Winners ==
Year	Winner	Age	Jockey	Trainer	Owner	Distance	Time	Purse	Grade	Ref
Cigar Mile Handicap
2025	Bishops Bay	5	Flavien Prat	Brad H. Cox	KAS Stable	1 mile	1:34.62	$500,000	II	
2024	Locked	3	John R. Velazquez	Todd A. Pletcher	Eclipse Thoroughbred Partners & Walmac Farm	1 mile	1:34.52	$500,000	II	
2023	Hoist The Gold	4	John R. Velazquez	Dallas Stewart	Dream Team One Racing Stable	1 mile	1:34.28	$500,000	II	
2022	Mind Control	6	John R. Velazquez	Todd A. Pletcher	Red Oak Stable & Madaket Stables	1 mile	1:35.53	$750,000	I	
2021	Americanrevolution	3	Luis Saez	Todd A. Pletcher	WinStar Farm & China Horse Club	1 mile	1:36.68	$750,000	I	
2020	True Timber	6	Kendrick Carmouche	Jack Sisterson	Calumet Farm	1 mile	1:36.49	$250,000	I	
2019	Maximum Security	3	Luis Saez	Jason Servis	Mary & Gary West	1 mile	1:36.46	$750,000	I	
2018	Patternrecognition	5	Jose L. Ortiz	Chad C. Brown	Klaravich Stables & William H. Lawrence	1 mile	1:34.98	$784,125	I	
2017	Sharp Azteca	4	Javier Castellano	Jorge Navarro	Ivan Rodriguez	1 mile	1:35.17	$750,000	I	
2016	Connect	3	Javier Castellano	Chad C. Brown	Paul P. Pompa Jr.	1 mile	1:35.34	$500,000	I	
2015	Tonalist	4	John R. Velazquez	Christophe Clement	Robert S. Evans	1 mile	1:37.14	$670,000	I	
2014	Private Zone	5	Martin A. Pedroza	Alfredo Velazquez	Good Friends Stable	1 mile	1:34.39	$753,750	I	
2013	Flat Out	7	Junior Alvarado	William I. Mott	Preston Stables	1 mile	1:34.68	$753,000	I	
2012	Stay Thirsty	4	Ramon A. Dominguez	Todd A. Pletcher	Repole Stable	1 mile	1:35.47	$343,000	I	
2011	To Honor and Serve	3	Jose Lezcano	William I. Mott	Live Oak Racing	1 mile	1:33.89	$250,000	I	
2010	Jersey Town	4	Cornelio Velasquez	Barclay Tagg	Charles E. Fipke	1 mile	1:34.43	$250,000	I	
2009	Kodiak Kowboy	4	Shaun Bridgmohan	Steven M. Asmussen	Fox Hill Farm & Vinery Stables	1 mile	1:35.57	$300,000	I	
2008	†Tale of Ekati	3	Edgar S. Prado	Barclay Tagg	Charles E. Fipke	1 mile	1:35.01	$300,000	I	
2007	Daaher	3	Michael J. Luzzi	Kiaran P. McLaughlin	Shadwell Racing	1 mile	1:33.79	$294,000	I	
2006	Discreet Cat	3	Garrett K. Gomez	Saeed bin Suroor	Godolphin Racing	1 mile	1:32.46	$294,000	I	
2005	Purge	4	Garrett K. Gomez	Todd A. Pletcher	Starlight Racing	1 mile	1:34.26	$350,000	I	
2004	Lion Tamer	4	Jose A. Santos	Todd A. Pletcher	Michael B. Tabor	1 mile	1:33.46	$350,000	I	
2003	Congaree	5	Jerry D. Bailey	Bob Baffert	Stonerside Stable	1 mile	1:34.30	$350,000	I	
2002	Congaree	4	Jerry D. Bailey	Bob Baffert	Stonerside Stable	1 mile	1:33.11	$350,000	I	
2001	Left Bank	4	John R. Velazquez	Todd A. Pletcher	Michael B. Tabor	1 mile	1:33.35	$350,000	I	
2000	El Corredor	3	Jerry D. Bailey	Bob Baffert	Hal Earnhardt III	1 mile	1:34.68	$350,000	I	
1999	Affirmed Success	5	Jorge F. Chavez	Richard E. Schosberg	Albert Fried Jr.	1 mile	1:34.18	$350,000	I	
1998	Sir Bear	5	Jerry D. Bailey	Ralph Ziadie	Barbara Smollin	1 mile	1:34.05	$300,000	I	
1997	Devious Course	5	Jorge F. Chavez	H. James Bond	Clarence Scharbauer Jr.	1 mile	1:34.80	$250,000	I	
NYRA Mile Handicap
1996	Gold Fever	3	Mike E. Smith	Claude R. McGaughey III	Cynthia Phipps	1 mile	1:34.98	$250,000	I	
1995	Flying Chevron	3	Robbie Davis	James J. Toner	Caesar P. Kimmel	1 mile	1:34.57	$250,000	I	
1994	Cigar	4	Jerry D. Bailey	William I. Mott	Madeleine Paulson	1 mile	1:36.10	$250,000	I	
1993	Race not held									
1992	Ibero (ARG)	5	Laffit Pincay Jr.	Ron McAnally	Frank Whitham	1 mile	1:33.97	$500,000	I	
1991	Rubiano	4	Jose A. Santos	Flint S. Schulhofer	Centennial Farm	1 mile	1:33.68	$500,000	I	
1990	Quiet American	4	Chris McCarron	Gary F. Jones	Sheikh Mohammed	1 mile	1:32.80	$638,000	I	
1989	Dispersal	3	Angel Cordero Jr.	Bud Delp	Tom O. Myerhoff	1 mile	1:32.80	$581,000		
1988	Forty Niner	3	William Fox Jr.	Woodford C. Stephens	Claiborne Farm	1 mile	1:34.00	$567,000		

Notes:
† In the 2006 running of the event Harlem Rocker was first past the post in a photo finish by a nose margin but was disqualified for interference in the straight and was placed second. Tale of Ekati was declared the official winner of the event.

== See also ==
- List of American and Canadian Graded races

== External sites ==
- Ten Things You Should Know About the Cigar Mile at Hello Race Fans!
