= Verrazano (horse) =

American-bred Thoroughbred racehorse

- Sire: More Than Ready
- Grandsire: Southern Halo
- Dam: Enchanted Rock
- Damsire: Giant's Causeway
- Sex: Colt
- Foaled: 27 January 2010
- Country: United States
- Color: Bay
- Breeder: Emory A Hamilton
- Owner: Let's Go Stable & Coolmore
- Trainer: Todd Pletcher; Aidan O'Brien
- Record: 13:6-1-2
- Earnings: $1,878,013

Major wins
- Tampa Bay Derby (2013); Wood Memorial Stakes (2013); Pegasus Stakes (2013); Haskell Invitational Stakes (2013)

Verrazano (foaled 27 January 2010) is an American Thoroughbred racehorse. In 2013, trained by Todd Pletcher, he established himself as one of the leading three-year-old colts with early wins in the Tampa Bay Derby and Wood Memorial Stakes. He finished fourteenth in the Kentucky Derby and missed the remaining two legs of the Triple Crown but returned to prominence later in the summer with wins in the Pegasus Stakes and the Haskell Invitational Stakes. In his four-year-old year, he was campaigned in Europe, trained by Aidan O'Brien.

== Background ==
Verrazano is a bay colt with a white stripe and two white socks bred by Emory A Hamilton at Middlebrook Farm near Lexington, Kentucky. Steve Haskin has described him as looking "like Hercules next to mere mortals".

His sire, More Than Ready, showed his best form over sprint distances, recording his most important success in the Grade I King's Bishop Stakes at Saratoga in 2000. He stands at the Vinery Stud in Kentucky, and has also been shuttled to stand in Australia and New Zealand during the southern hemisphere breeding season. As a stallion his greatest success before the emergence of Verrazano had come with his southern hemisphere stock, including More Joyous, a mare who won nine Group One races. Verrazano's dam Enchanted Rock showed no ability on her only racecourse appearance, but has become a successful broodmare, also producing the Risen Star Stakes winner El Padrino.

As a yearling, Verrazano was consigned by the Middlebrook Farm to the Keeneland sale. On 14 September he was sold to the Let's Go Stable (managed by Bryan Sullivan and Kevin Scatuorchio) for $250,000. Scatuorchio named the horse after the Verrazzano–Narrows Bridge.

== Racing career ==
=== 2013: three-year-old season ===
Verrazano was unraced as a two-year-old, making his racecourse debut on January 1, 2013, in a Maiden Special Weight over six and a half furlongs at Gulfstream Park. Ridden as in all his races by the Puerto Rican-born Hall of Fame jockey John Velazquez, he took the lead in the straight and drew away from his ten opponents to win by seven and three-quarter lengths in a time of 1:16.48. A month later at the same course, Verrazano was moved up in distance for an allowance race over one mile and started the 1/5 favourite. Taking the lead on the final turn, he increased his lead throughout the closing stages to win by sixteen lengths in a time of 1:34.8, just over a second outside Commentator's track record. The Blood-Horse described the performance as a "spectacular" one which established Verrazano as a Kentucky Derby prospect. Following the race a half share in the colt was bought for an undisclosed sum by the Coolmore organisation, represented by Michael Tabor, Susan Magnier and Derrick Smith. Verrazano remained in Florida for his next race on March 9, when he was stepped up in class and distance to contest the Grade II Tampa Bay Derby over one and one sixteenth miles. Starting the 2/5 favourite, he bobbled leaving the starting gate but recovered quickly and took the lead after three furlongs. He was never seriously challenged and won by three lengths "with a bit in reserve". After the race, Pletcher said: "It was a good performance. He is a lot like his sire; he has a great disposition and a great mind... he is so naturally fast for a big horse".

Pletcher moved the colt north to Aqueduct Racetrack in April for the Grade I Wood Memorial Stakes, an important trial race for the Kentucky. Velasquez positioned the 4/5 favorite just behind the leaders before taking the lead half a mile from the finish. He held the persistent challenge of Vyjack throughout the closing stages and won by three quarter of a length from the fast-finishing Normandy Invasion. Following his success, Pletcher called Verrazano "the legitimate Kentucky Derby favorite" whilst admitting that the colt still lacked experience and had a tendency to idle in the straight. On 4 May, Verrazano was one of nineteen colts to contest the 139th running of the Kentucky Derby. He looked likely to dispute favoritism on the morning of the race but was weakly supported on the course and started the 8.7/1 fourth choice behind Orb, Revolutionary, and Goldencents. He was among the early leaders as Palace Malice set an exceptionally fast pace but came under pressure approaching the final turn and faded in the stretch, finishing fourteenth behind Orb.

Verrazano missed the two remaining legs of the Triple Crown, reappearing on June 16 in the Grade III Pegasus Stakes at Monmouth Park. The colt's task was made much easier when his main betting rival, Preakness Stakes runner-up Itsmyluckyday, pulled up injured early in the race, and he led from the start before drawing away in the stretch to win by nine and a quarter lengths. After the race, Velasquez commented, "His ears were wagging every step of the way and around the three-eighths pole I gave him a little nudge, and he knew it was time to go". Verrazano returned to Grade I competition in the Haskell Invitational Stakes at Monmouth Park on July 28. His main rival appeared to be Preakness winner Oxbow, while the field also included Vyjack and Kentucky Derby runner-up Golden Soul. Velasquez tracked Oxbow before overtaking the Preakness winner three furlongs from the finish. Verrazano extended his advantage throughout the closing stages and won by nine and three-quarter lengths from Power Broker. The winning margin was the widest in the history of the race. Velasquez said, "He was awesome today. He did it real easy and made me look very good. He was going so good. I knew I had a lot of horse left. When I asked him to go down the stretch, he did it." Verrazano started the 8/5 favorite for the Travers Stakes on 24 August against a field which included Kentucky Derby winner Orb and Belmont Stakes winner Palace Malice. He tracked the leaders but faded in the straight and finished seventh of the nine runners, seven lengths behind upset winner Will Take Charge.

Verrazano's final race of the year was the Breeders' Cup Dirt Mile on November 1, 2013; it had been announced that he was most likely to be retired to stud. He started the 5/2 favorite but struggled to match the early pace and finished fourth behind Goldencents. On 30 November, Verrazano, ridden for the first time by Javier Castellano, contested the Cigar Mile Handicap at Aqueduct. He finished third of the ten runners behind Flat Out, with Groupie Doll in fourth and Goldencents in seventh place.

=== 2014: four-year-old season ===
In February 2014, it was announced that instead of retiring, Verrazano would be campaigned in Europe, being trained by Aidan O'Brien at Ballydoyle. The colt made his European debut in the Group One Lockinge Stakes at Newbury Racecourse on 17 May and finished third to Olympic Glory. A month later, he was beaten three-quarters of a length into second place by Toronado in the Queen Anne Stakes at Royal Ascot. O'Brien described the performance as a "lovely run" and nominated the Eclipse Stakes, International Stakes and Irish Champion Stakes as possible targets. On 5 July Verrazano started at odds of 7/1 for the Eclipse Stakes at Sandown Park Racecourse but after racing in fourth place until halfway, he weakened and finished last of the nine runners behind Mukhadram. He was lame after the race, and the injury was not deemed "significant" but was severe enough that he would not be ready to run by the Breeders' Cup races in the fall.

== Stud career ==
On August 14, 2014, it was announced that Verrazano would be retired and stand at stud in the United States at Ashford Stud in Kentucky. Verrazano had previously shuttled internationally from his base at Coolmore's Ashford Stud in Kentucky, standing the 2015 Southern Hemisphere season in Australia before standing in Chile in 2016 and 2017. In September 2019, Verrazano was sold to stand in Brazil.

=== Notable Progeny ===
c = colt, f = filly, g = gelding

Foaled	Name	Sex	Major wins
2018	Kirikina	f	Clásico Polla de Potrancas (CHI)
2018	Misia Nena	f	Gran Premio Tanteo de Potrancas (CHI)
2019	Chi Town Lady	f	Test Stakes

== Pedigree ==
Pedigree of Verrazano (USA), bay colt, 2010
Sire More Than Ready (USA) 1997	Southern Halo (USA); 1983	Halo	Hail To Reason
Sire More Than Ready (USA) 1997	Southern Halo (USA); 1983	Halo	Cosmah
Sire More Than Ready (USA) 1997	Southern Halo (USA); 1983	Northern Sea	Northern Dancer
Sire More Than Ready (USA) 1997	Southern Halo (USA); 1983	Northern Sea	Sea Saga
Sire More Than Ready (USA) 1997	Woodman's Girl (USA); 1990	Woodman	Mr. Prospector
Sire More Than Ready (USA) 1997	Woodman's Girl (USA); 1990	Woodman	Playmate
Sire More Than Ready (USA) 1997	Woodman's Girl (USA); 1990	Becky Be Good	Naskra
Sire More Than Ready (USA) 1997	Woodman's Girl (USA); 1990	Becky Be Good	Good Landing
Dam Enchanted Rock (USA) 2004	Giant's Causeway (USA); 1997	Storm Cat	Storm Bird
Dam Enchanted Rock (USA) 2004	Giant's Causeway (USA); 1997	Storm Cat	Terlingua
Dam Enchanted Rock (USA) 2004	Giant's Causeway (USA); 1997	Mariah's Storm	Rahy
Dam Enchanted Rock (USA) 2004	Giant's Causeway (USA); 1997	Mariah's Storm	Immense
Dam Enchanted Rock (USA) 2004	Chic Shirine (USA); 1984	Mr. Prospector	Raise a Native
Dam Enchanted Rock (USA) 2004	Chic Shirine (USA); 1984	Mr. Prospector	Gold Digger
Dam Enchanted Rock (USA) 2004	Chic Shirine (USA); 1984	Too Chic	Blushing Groom
Dam Enchanted Rock (USA) 2004	Chic Shirine (USA); 1984	Too Chic	Remedia (Family: 13-d)

Verrazano is inbred 3 x 4 to Mr. Prospector, meaning that this stallion appears in both the third and fourth generations of his pedigree.
