= Double Jay (horse) =

American-bred Thoroughbred racehorse

- Sire: Balladier
- Grandsire: Black Toney
- Dam: Broom Shot
- Damsire: Whisk Broom
- Sex: Stallion
- Foaled: 1944
- Country: United States
- Colour: Black/Brown
- Breeder: John W. Stanley
- Owner: Ridgewood Stable
- Trainer: Walter L. McCue
- Record: 48: 17-9-9
- Earnings: US$299,005

Major wins
- James H. Connors Memorial Stakes (1946); Kentucky Jockey Club Stakes (1946); Newport Stakes (1946); Garden State Stakes (1946); Jersey Handicap (1947); Riggs Handicap (1947); Benjamin Franklin Handicap (1947); Prince George Autumn Handicap (1947); Trenton Handicap (1948); American Handicap (1949); Mission Handicap (1949)

Awards
- American Champion Two-Year-Old Colt (1946); Leading broodmare sire in North America (1971, 1975, 1977, 1981)

Double Jay (1944–1972) was an American Thoroughbred racehorse. Bred by John W. Stanley in Lexington, Kentucky, he was purchased as a yearling for $19,000 by Wilmington, Delaware businessmen James V. Tigani and James Boines who raced them under their newly formed partnership, Ridgewood Stable.

Trained by Walter "Duke" McCue, as a two-year-old, Double Jay won six of ten starts. He won two stakes races at Narragansett Park. DJ capped off his campaign with a win in the Garden State Stakes on October 19, 1946, and a year topper in the Kentucky Jockey Club Stakes at Churchill Downs on November 2. His performances that year earned him American Champion Two-Year-Old Colt honors.

Racing at age three, Double Jay was one of the early favorites for the Kentucky Derby, the first leg of the U.S. Triple Crown series. However, he finished third in an allowance race in April at Churchill Downs and then was fifth in a six-horse field in the Derby Trial Stakes behind winner, Faultless and as a result, was sent off as a long-shot in the Derby. After finishing a distant twelfth in the Derby's thirteen-horse field he did not run in the Preakness and Belmont Stakes. While he went on to win the important Jersey Handicap, he did not achieve the same level of success at three as he had at two.

Racing at age four and five, Double Jay's most important win came in California in the 1949 American Handicap in which he equaled the track record of 1:48.60 for 1 1/8 miles (1.8 km) in the year when the race was run at Santa Anita Park.

== A Champion broodmare sire ==
The sire of several good runners, Double Jay produced progeny that included:

- Manotick (b. 1952) - won Ladies Handicap, Gazelle Stakes, Molly Pitcher Handicap
- Bagdad (b. 1956) - wins included the San Antonio Handicap and Hollywood Derby
- Irish Jay (b. 1957) - filly whose wins include the Spinaway Stakes, Demoiselle Stakes, Acorn Stakes, Comely Stakes
- Sunrise Flight (b. 1959) - multiple stakes winner, damsire of Kentucky Derby and Preakness Stakes winner, Pleasant Colony

Double Jay was the North American Champion broodmare sire in 1971, 1975, 1977, and 1981 and was second in three other years: 1972, 1976, 1980. Of his daughter's successful progeny, Double Jay is best remembered as the damsire of:

- Old Hat (b. 1959) - two-time American Champion Older Female Horse;
- Nodouble (b. 1965) - American Champion Older Male Horse and 1981 Leading sire in North America;
- John Henry (b. 1975) - two-time American Horse of the Year and U.S. Racing Hall of Fame inductee;
- Ferdinand (b. 1983) - won Kentucky Derby, Breeders' Cup Classic.

Double Jay died in 1972 and is buried in the equine cemetery at Claiborne Farm near Paris, Kentucky.

== Sire line tree ==
- Double Jay
  - Tick Tock
  - Bagdad
    - Drin
    - Old Bag
      - Holding Pattern
    - Saber Mountain
    - Fiddle Isle
    - Tarboosh
  - Jay Fox
  - Noble Jay
    - Tan Jay
  - Sunrise Flight
  - Bupers
  - Repeating
  - Spring Double
    - Deux Coup
    - Double Reefed
    - Traveling Music
  - Rose Argent
    - Gusty O'Shay
  - Honey Jay

== Pedigree ==
Pedigree of Double Jay, black/brown stallion, 1944
Sire Balladier	Black Toney	Peter Pan	Commando
Sire Balladier	Black Toney	Peter Pan	Cinderella
Sire Balladier	Black Toney	Belgravia	Ben Brush*
Sire Balladier	Black Toney	Belgravia	Bonnie Gal
Sire Balladier	Blue Warbler	North Star	Sunstar
Sire Balladier	Blue Warbler	North Star	Angelic
Sire Balladier	Blue Warbler	May Bird	Thrush
Sire Balladier	Blue Warbler	May Bird	May Bruce
Dam Broomshot	Whisk Broom II	Broomstick	Ben Brush*
Dam Broomshot	Whisk Broom II	Broomstick	Elf
Dam Broomshot	Whisk Broom II	Audience	Sir Dixon
Dam Broomshot	Whisk Broom II	Audience	Sallie McClelland
Dam Broomshot	Centre Shot	Sain	St Serf
Dam Broomshot	Centre Shot	Sain	The Task
Dam Broomshot	Centre Shot	Grand Shot	Foul Shot
Dam Broomshot	Centre Shot	Grand Shot	Grand Lady (family: 14-a)

* Double Jay is inbred 4S x 4D to the stallion Ben Brush, meaning that he appears fourth generation on the sire side of his pedigree, and fourth generation on the dam side of his pedigree.
