= Patrick B. Devereux Sr. =

American racehorse trainer

Patrick Devereux Sr.
Personal information
- Born: November 4, 1926 Kentucky
- Died: August 3, 2003 (aged 76) Lexington, Kentucky
- Resting place: Calvary Cemetery, Lexington, Kentucky
- Occupation: Racehorse Trainer

Horse racing career
- Sport: Horse racing

Major racing wins
- Fayette Handicap (1969, 1970, 1971); Latonia Spring Inaugural (1967); Regret Stakes (1970)

Significant horses
- Brustigert, Prince Stearic, Royal Harmony, Royal Stearic

Patrick Brady Devereux Sr. (November 4, 1926 – August 3, 2003) was an American Thoroughbred racehorse trainer.

He is best known for training Royal Harmony owned by his father Thomas F. Devereux. The gelding won three consecutive editions of the Fayette Handicap at Keeneland Race Course. He is the only trainer in the history of Keeneland to saddle the same horse to victory in the same stakes race, three years running.

A resident of Lexington, Kentucky, Devereux was still active in racing at the time of his death in 2003. His son Patrick Devereux Jr. also trains thoroughbreds.
