= Kinsman Stable =

Thoroughbred racing stable of George Steinbrenner

Coordinates: 29.152°N 82.298°W

Kinsman Stable & Stud
- Company type: Horse breeding/Racing Stable
- Industry: Thoroughbred Horse racing
- Headquarters: Ocala, Florida, United States

Kinsman Stable is the nom de course for the American Thoroughbred racing stable of George Steinbrenner, best known as the owner of the New York Yankees Major League Baseball team. A director and former president of the Florida Thoroughbred Breeders' and Owners' Association, Steinbrenner became involved with the sport in the early 1970s and owned the 860-acre (3.5 km^{2}) Kinsman Stud Farm in Ocala, Florida where his Thoroughbreds are stabled. His son Hank and daughter Jessica are both involved in the business.

As of 2008, Kinsman Stable has bred and/or raced more than thirty-five stakes winners. In 2005 their colt Bellamy Road won the Wood Memorial Stakes and was then sent off as the betting favorite in the Kentucky Derby but finished seventh to the winner, Giacomo. For 2008, the stable had another Derby prospect in Hopeful Stakes winner, Majestic Warrior.
