= Steve Sexton Mile Stakes =

American Thoroughbred horse race

- Class: Grade III
- Location: Lone Star Park; Grand Prairie, Texas, United States
- Inaugurated: 1997 (as Texas Mile Stakes)
- Race type: Thoroughbred - Flat racing
- Website: www.lonestarpark.com

Race information
- Distance: 1 mile (8 furlongs)
- Surface: Dirt
- Track: Left-handed
- Qualification: Three-years-old and older
- Weight: Base weights with allowances: 4-year-olds and up: 124 lbs. 3-year-olds: 121 lbs.
- Purse: $400,000 (2021)

The Steve Sexton Mile Stakes is a Grade III American Thoroughbred horse race for horses three years old and older over the distance of one mile (8 furlongs on the dirt scheduled annually in late May at Lone Star Park in Grand Prairie, Texas.

== History ==
The inaugural running of the event was on 20 April in 1997 as the Texas Mile Stakes and was won by Isitingood who was trained by the US Hall of Fame trainer Bob Baffert and owned by Michael E. Pegram & Terry Henn in a time of 1:34.44. The winning time continues to this day to be the stakes record.

After being classified as a Listed event in 1999 it became the first graded Thoroughbred stakes race in Texas.

In 2001, Dixie Dot Com became the only horse to win in the same year the Texas Mile and the Lone Star Park Handicap, known as "The Texas Two Step."

Among notable horses who ran in the Texas Mile but did not win were Skip Away, who finished third in 1997, and Real Quiet who finished second in 1999.

Beginning with the 2017 running, the race was renamed to honor Steve Sexton, a member of Lone Star Park's original management team who had died the previous year. Sexton also oversaw Churchill Downs from 2002-2009 and was the 12th president in the track's history. Sexton, an executive vice-president with Churchill Downs Inc., also served as president of Churchill Downs Entertainment Group following his time as track president.

In 2020 due to the COVID-19 pandemic in the United States, Lone Star Park did not schedule the event in their updated and shortened spring-summer meeting.

== Records ==
Speed record:

- 1:34.44 - Isitingood (1997) (stakes and track record)

Margins:

- 8 lengths - Monterey Jazz (2008)

Most wins:

- 2 - Littlebitlively (1998, 1999)
- 2 - Heroic Move (2024, 2026)

Most wins by a jockey:

- 3 - David Flores (1997, 2001, 2008)

Most wins by a trainer:

- 4 - Steven M. Asmussen (2011, 2013, 2018, 2022)
- 4 - Bob Baffert (1997, 2006, 2010, 2017)
- 4 - Robertino Diodoro (2023, 2024, 2025, 2026)

Most wins by an owner:

- 2 - Mike Pegram (1997, 2006)
- 2 - John A. Franks (1998, 1999)
- 2 - Perry Martin (2021, 2025)
- 2 - Arnold Bennewith, Randy Howg, Lana Wiest, Norman Tremblay & R 6 Stable (2024, 2026)

== Winners ==
Year	Winner	Age	Jockey	Trainer	Owner	Distance	Time	Purse	Grade	Ref
Steve Sexton Mile Stakes
2026	Heroic Move	6	Geovanni Franco	Robertino Diodoro	Arnold Bennewith, Rick Wiest, Clayton Wiest, Lana Wiest, Randy Howg, Norman Tremblay and R 6 Stable	1 mile	1:36.92	$400,000	III	
2025	Komorebino Omoide (JPN)	5	Ramon Vazquez	Robertino Diodoro	Perry Martin	1 mile	1:38.29	$400,000	III	
2024	Heroic Move	4	Harry Hernandez	Robertino Diodoro	Arnold Bennewith, Randy Howg, Lana Wiest, R6 Stables, Gary Kropp & Norman Tremblay	1 mile	1:37.69	$400,000	III	
2023	Frosted Grace	7	Cristian Torres	Robertino Diodoro	Flying P Stable	1 mile	1:37.99	$400,000	III	
2022	Silver Prospector	5	Stewart Elliott	Steven M. Asmussen	Ed & Susie Orr	1 mile	1:37.20	$400,000	III	
2021	Mo Mosa	4	Ramon Vazquez	Michael J. Maker	Perry & Denise Martin	1 mile	1:37.15	$400,000	III	
2020	Race not held									
2019	Mocito Rojo	5	Filemon T. Rodriguez	Shane Wilson	Wayne T. Davis	1 mile	1:37.06	$300,000	III	
2018	Bee Jersey	4	Ricardo Santana Jr.	Steven M. Asmussen	Charles E. Fipke	1 mile	1:36.78	$200,000	III	
2017	Mor Spirit	4	Mike E. Smith	Bob Baffert	Michael Lund Petersen	1 mile	1:36.86	$200,000	III	
Texas Mile Stakes
2016	Great Minds	5	Charles J. McMahon	Albert Stall Jr.	Vince Wilfork	1 mile	1:37.68	$200,000	III	
2015	Texas Air	7	Quincy Hamilton	Allen Milligan	Paul J. Rigali Jr.	1 mile	1:37.31	$200,000	III	
2014	Grand Contender	6	Richard E. Eramia	Thomas M. Amoss	Maggi Moss	1 mile	1:36.68	$200,000	III	
2013	Master Rick	5	Ricardo Santana Jr.	Steven M. Asmussen	Zayat Stables	1 mile	1:36.01	$200,000	III	
2012	Endorsement	5	Robby Albarado	Eoin G. Harty	Casner Racing	1 mile	1:36.69	$200,000	III	
2011	Thiskyhasnolimit	4	Justin Shepherd	Steven M. Asmussen	Cathy & Bob Zollars & Mark Wagner	1 mile	1:37.28	$200,000	III	
2010	Mythical Power	4	Martin Garcia	Bob Baffert	Peachtree Stable	1 mile	1:35.71	$200,000	III	
2009	Jonesboro	7	M. Clifton Berry	Randy L. Morse	Michael Langford	1 mile	1:36.94	$300,000	III	
2008	Monterey Jazz	4	David R. Flores	Craig Dollase	A and R Stables & Class Racing Stable	1 mile	1:35.25	$300,000	III	
2007	Silent Pleasure	4	Tracy J. Hebert	Howard Scarberry	S & S Stables	1 mile	1:35.39	$300,000	III	
2006	Preachinatthebar	5	Jon Court	Bob Baffert	Michael E. Pegram	1 mile	1:36.81	$300,000	III	
2005	High Strike Zone	5	Ricky J. Faul	Amos Laborde	Donald W. Erickson	1 mile	1:35.34	$300,000	III	
2004	Kela	6	David C. Nuesch	Mike R. Mitchell	Jay Manoogian	1 mile	1:35.64	$300,000	III	
2003	Bluesthestandard	6	Martin A. Pedroza	Ted H. West	Jeffrey Sengara	1 mile	1:35.68	$300,000	III	
2002	Unrullah Bull	5	Anthony J. Lovato	Cole Norman	James C. & Theresa L. Donnan	1 mile	1:37.78	$300,000	III	
2001	Dixie Dot Com	6	David R. Flores	William J. Morey Jr.	Carole & Don Chaiken, Mr. & Mrs. Barton D. Heller	1 mile	1:34.72	$300,000	III	
2000	Sir Bear	7	Eibar Coa	Ralph Ziadie	Barbara Smollin	1 mile	1:35.98	$300,000	III	
1999	Littlebitlively	5	Carlos Gonzalez	Bobby C. Barnett	John A. Franks	1 mile	1:35.65	$250,000	III	
1998	Littlebitlively	4	Carlos Gonzalez	Bobby C. Barnett	John A. Franks	1 mile	1:37.07	$250,000	Listed	
1997	Isitingood	6	David Flores	Bob Baffert	Michael E. Pegram & Terry Henn	1 Mile	1:34.44	$250,000	Listed	

== See also ==
List of American and Canadian Graded races
