= Bellamy Road (horse) =

American-bred Thoroughbred racehorse

- Bellamy Road at Old Friends (2024)
- Breed: Thoroughbred
- Sire: Concerto
- Grandsire: Chief's Crown
- Dam: Hurry Home Hillary
- Damsire: Deputed Testamony
- Foaled: 2002
- Country: USA
- Color: Dark bay/brown
- Breeder: Dianne D. Cotter
- Owner: Kinsman Stable
- Trainer: Nicholas P. Zito
- Record: 7:4-1-0
- Earnings: $811,400

Major wins
- Cradle Stakes (2004); Wood Memorial Stakes (2005)
- Last updated on July 8, 2020

Bellamy Road (foaled April 5, 2002) is an American Thoroughbred racehorse and the winner of the 2005 Wood Memorial Stakes. He was owned by the Kinsman Stable, the nom de course of George Steinbrenner, principal owner and managing partner of the New York Yankees baseball team.

== Career ==
Bellamy Road's first race was on August 3, 2004 at Delaware Park, where he came in first. He won his next race, the 2004 Cradle Stakes on September 6, 2004.

He competed in the 2004 Breeders' Futurity Stakes, but came in seventh. He rebounded with a win at Gulfstream Park on March 12, 2005, and then won the 2005 Wood Memorial Stakes. This proved to be the last win of his career.

He was considered a favorite for the 2005 Kentucky Derby, but finished seventh. He then ended his career with a second place finish in the 2005 Travers Stakes.

== Retirement ==
In 2021, Bellamy Road was retired to Old Friends in Georgetown, Kentucky.

== Stud career ==
Bellamy Road's descendants include:

c = colt, f = filly, g = gelding

Foaled	Name	Sex	Major Wins
2008	Toby's Corner	c	Wood Memorial Stakes
2009	Balance The Budget	g	Colonial Cup
2013	Constellation	f	La Brea Stakes
2013	Diversify	g	Whitney Stakes, Jockey Club Gold Cup

== Pedigree ==
Pedigree of Bellamy Road (USA), 2002
Sire Concerto (USA) 1994	Chief's Crown (USA); 1982	Danzig	Northern Dancer
Sire Concerto (USA) 1994	Chief's Crown (USA); 1982	Danzig	Pas De Nom
Sire Concerto (USA) 1994	Chief's Crown (USA); 1982	Six Crowns	Secretariat
Sire Concerto (USA) 1994	Chief's Crown (USA); 1982	Six Crowns	Chris Evert
Sire Concerto (USA) 1994	Undeniably (USA); 1987	In Reality	Intentionally
Sire Concerto (USA) 1994	Undeniably (USA); 1987	In Reality	My Dear Girl
Sire Concerto (USA) 1994	Undeniably (USA); 1987	Past Forgetting	Messenger of Song
Sire Concerto (USA) 1994	Undeniably (USA); 1987	Past Forgetting	Pastiche
Dam Hurry Home Hillary (USA) 1995	Deputed Testamony (USA); 1980	Traffic Cop	Traffic Judge
Dam Hurry Home Hillary (USA) 1995	Deputed Testamony (USA); 1980	Traffic Cop	Flight Bird
Dam Hurry Home Hillary (USA) 1995	Deputed Testamony (USA); 1980	Proof Requested	Prove It
Dam Hurry Home Hillary (USA) 1995	Deputed Testamony (USA); 1980	Proof Requested	Come On
Dam Hurry Home Hillary (USA) 1995	Ten Cents a Turn (USA); 1990	Cozzene	Caro
Dam Hurry Home Hillary (USA) 1995	Ten Cents a Turn (USA); 1990	Cozzene	Ride the Trails
Dam Hurry Home Hillary (USA) 1995	Ten Cents a Turn (USA); 1990	Rub Al Khali	Mr. Prospector
Dam Hurry Home Hillary (USA) 1995	Ten Cents a Turn (USA); 1990	Rub Al Khali	Arabian Dancer
