= Old Hat Stakes =

- Class: Defunct (not raced since 2017)
- Location: Gulfstream Park; Hallandale Beach, Florida
- Inaugurated: 1976
- Race type: Thoroughbred - Flat racing
- Website: www.gulfstreampark.com

Race information
- Distance: 6 furlongs
- Surface: Dirt
- Track: left-handed
- Qualification: Three-year-old fillies
- Purse: $100,000

The Old Hat Stakes was an American flat Thoroughbred horse race for three-year-old fillies held annually in early January at Gulfstream Park in Hallandale Beach, Florida. It was raced run over a distance of 6 furlongs on dirt. It became a graded race for the first time in 2005 and last held in 2017.

The race was named after Old Hat, an exceptional racing mare who often vied with the great Affectionately. Old Hat raced for six years and won the American Champion Older Female Horse award in 1964 and 1965. Old Hat started 80 times, winning 35, placing in 18, and showing in 9.

The Old Hat is an important prep race for the Kentucky Oaks.

== Past winners ==
- 2017 - Wildcat Kate (Eduardo O. Nunez)
- 2016 - Lucy N Ethel (Joshua Navarro)
- 2015 - Ekati's Phaeton (Luis Saez)
- 2014 - Sweet Whiskey (Javier Castellano)
- 2013 - Kauai Katie (John Velazquez)
- 2012 - Sacristy (Kent Desormeaux)
- 2011 - Final Mesa (Joel Rosario)
- 2010 - Richiegirlgonewild (Timothy Thornton)
- 2009 - Gemswick Park (John Velazquez)
- 2008 - Game Face (John Velazquez)
- 2007 – Dream Rush (Rafael Bejarano) (Dreaming of Anna came in third.)
- 2006 – Misty Rosette (Sebastian Madrid) (Grade I winner, Swap Fliparoo, placed.)
- 2005 – Maddalena (John Velazquez)
- 2004 – Madcap Escapade (setting a stakes record for six furlongs) (Smokey Glaken came in third.)
- 2003 – House Party (José A. Santos)
- 2002 – A New Twist (Edgar Prado)
- 2001 –
- 2000 – Swept Away
- 1999 – Belle’s Appeal (Richard Migliore)
- 1998 – Evening Hush (Robbie Davis)
- 1997 – Cupid’s Revenge
- 1996 – JJ'sdream (Mike E. Smith)
- 1995 – Bluff’s Dividend (José A. Santos)
- 1994 – Pagofire (Jerry Bailey)
- 1993 – Sum Runner (Earlie Fires)
- 1992 – Super Doer (René R. Douglas)
- 1991 - My Own True Love
- 1990 – Sun Luck and Traki Traki (dead heat (Traki Traki is the dam of Bushfire)
- 1989 – Surging (Craig Perret)
- 1988 - On To Royalty (Jacinto Vásquez)
- 1987 - Sheer Ice
- 1986 - Noranc
- 1985 - Glorious Glory
- 1984 - Flip For Luck
- 1983 - Unaccompanied
- 1981 - Dame Mysterieuse (Eddie Maple)
- 1976 – Anne Campbell (1999 Broodmare of the Year)

== See also ==
- Road to the Kentucky Oaks
