= Old Hat (horse) =

American-bred Thoroughbred racehorse

- Sire: Boston Doge
- Grandsire: The Doge
- Dam: Fine Feathers
- Damsire: Double Jay
- Sex: Mare
- Foaled: 1959
- Country: USA
- Colour: Bay
- Breeder: W. A. Nelson
- Owner: Stanley Conrad
- Trainer: Charles C. Norman
- Record: 80: 35-18-9
- Earnings: $556,401

Major wins
- Yo Tambien Handicap (1962); Four Winds Stakes (1963); Suwannee River Handicap (1963, 1965); Delaware Handicap (1964); Spinster Stakes (1964); Falls City Handicap (1964, 1966); Matron Handicap (1965); Michigan Mile And One-Eighth Handicap (1965); Black Helen Handicap (1965); Fayette Handicap (1965); Columbiana Handicap (1965); Sweet Patootie Stakes (1966)

Awards
- TRA American Champion Older Female Horse (1964); American Champion Older Female Horse (1965)

Honours
- Old Hat Stakes run at Gulfstream Park

Old Hat (foaled in Kentucky in 1959), was an American Thoroughbred racing mare by Boston Doge out of Fine Feathers (1 win in 39 starts), whose sire was Double Jay. On his topline, Double Jay's grandsire was Black Toney. On his bottomline, it was Whisk Broom. Her sire, Boston Doge, was a multiple stakes winner. Out of 18 starts, he won 14.

Old Hat raced when the likes of Cicada, Summer Scandal (Co-champion older mare of 1966), Affectionately (no. 81 in the Blood-Horse magazine List of the Top 100 U.S. Racehorses of the 20th Century), Tosmah, Bowl of Flowers, and Venture were also competing. Among this company, she was voted Champion Female Handicap Horse by the Thoroughbred Racing Association in 1964, although the rival Daily Racing Form chose the three-year-old Tosmah. Old Hat won both awards in her best season, 1965, when she was six years old.

Old Hat raced for six years, starting in 80 races. She won 35 times, placed 18 times, and came in third 9 times. All in all, she was in the money 62 times.

== Notes and references ==
- Champions from 1893–2004, Daily Racing Form Press
