= Bob Baffert =

American horse owner and trainer (born 1953)

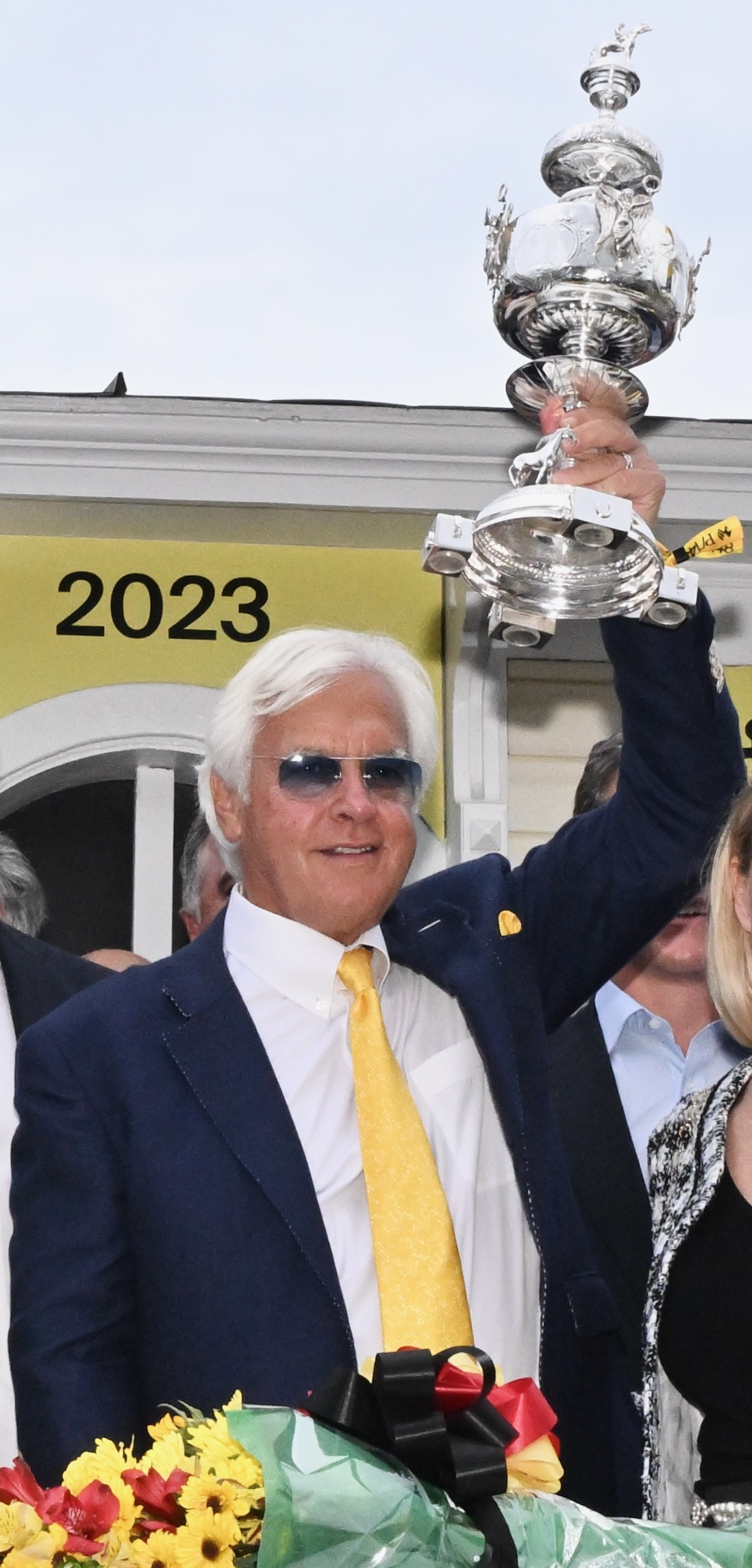
- Baffert at the 2023 Preakness Stakes

Personal information
- Born: January 13, 1953 (age 73) Nogales, Arizona, U.S.
- Occupation: Trainer

Horse racing career
- Sport: Horse racing
- Career wins: 3,524+ (ongoing)

Major racing wins
- American Classics wins: Kentucky Derby (1997, 1998, 2002, 2015, 2018, 2020); Preakness Stakes (1997, 1998, 2001, 2002, 2010, 2015, 2018, 2023); Belmont Stakes (2001, 2015, 2018); United States Triple Crown (2015, 2018); Breeders' Cup wins: Breeders' Cup Sprint (1992, 2007, 2008, 2013, 2016); Breeders' Cup Juvenile Fillies (1998, 2007); Breeders' Cup Juvenile (2002, 2008, 2013, 2018, 2021, 2024); Breeders' Cup Juvenile Sprint (2011); Breeders' Cup Classic (2014, 2015, 2016, 2020); Breeders' Cup Dirt Mile (2025); Breeders' Cup Filly & Mare Sprint (2020, 2025); International stakes wins: Dubai World Cup (1998, 2001, 2017, 2022); Dubai Golden Shaheen (2015); Grade 1 Stakes Wins: Acorn Stakes 2009, 2012, 2013, 2017, 2020; Alabama Stakes 1999; American Pharoah Stakes / FrontRunner Stakes / Norfolk Stakes 2009, 2012, 2014, 2018, 2019, 2021, 2022, 2023, 2024; Apple Blossom Handicap 2012, 2024; Arkansas Derby 2012, 2015, 2020, 2020, 2024; Ashland Stakes 1999; Awesome Again Stakes / Goodwood Stakes 2010, 2011, 2012, 2017, 2020, 2021, 2022; Ballerina Stakes 2018, 2021; Bing Crosby Stakes 2009, 2011, 2016; Blue Grass Stakes 2006; Carter Handicap 2003; Champagne Stakes 2001; Chandelier Stakes / Oak Leaf Stakes 1997, 1998, 1999, 2000, 2007, 2012, 2013, 2016, 2019; Charles Whittingham Memorial Handicap 2004; Cigar Mile Handicap 2000, 2002, 2003; Clark Handicap 2014; Clement L. Hirsch Stakes 2020, 2023, 2024; Coaching Club American Oaks 2017; Del Mar Debutante Stakes 1999, 2001, 2006, 2012, 2019, 2020, 2021, 2024; Del Mar Futurity 2008, 2009, 2011, 2012, 2014, 2016, 2018, 2021, 2022, 2023, 2024; Del Mar Oaks 1999, 2009; Donn Handicap 2001; Eddie Read Handicap 1999; Forego Stakes 2007, 2017; Frank E. Kilroe Mile Stakes 2024; Frizette Stakes 2007, 2010; Gazelle Handicap 1999; Gold Cup at Santa Anita Stakes / Hollywood Gold Cup Handicap 1999, 2003, 2011, 2012, 2013, 2017, 2020, 2021, 2023, 2024; Haskell Invitational Stakes 2001, 2002, 2005, 2010, 2011, 2012, 2014, 2015, 2020; Humana Distaff Stakes / Derby City Distaff Stakes 2006, 2014, 2021; Jockey Club Gold Cup Stakes 1999, 2016; Kentucky Oaks 1999, 2011, 2017; King's Bishop Stakes 1999, 2016; La Brea Stakes 1998, 1999, 2005, 2006, 2008, 2012, 2021, 2022; Las Virgenes Stakes 1999, 2003, 2012, 2015; Los Alamitos Derby / Swaps Stakes 2000, 2001; Los Alamitos Futurity / Hollywood Futurity 1997, 1999, 2000, 2008, 2009, 2011, 2014, 2015, 2016, 2017, 2018; Malibu Stakes 2011, 2013, 2018, 2020, 2022; Metropolitan Handicap 2017, 2024; Ogden Phipps Stakes 2018; Pacific Classic Stakes 1999, 2009, 2010, 2013, 2017, 2020, 2023; Pat O'Brien Stakes 2009, 2010, 2011; Pegasus World Cup Invitational Stakes 2017, 2020, 2024; Pennsylvania Derby 2017, 2018, 2022; Personal Ensign Stakes 2018; Pimlico Special Handicap 1999; Prioress Stakes 2004, 2008; Ramona Handicap 1999, 2000; Ruffian Stakes 2008, 2014; Santa Anita Derby 1996, 1998, 1999, 2001, 2009, 2011, 2015, 2018, 2019; Santa Anita Handicap 2000, 2010, 2011, 2013, 2014, 2024; Santa Anita Oaks 1999, 2003, 2024; Santa Anita Sprint Championship Stakes 2012, 2016; Santa Margarita Stakes 2017, 2024; Santa Maria Stakes 2002, 2012, 2017, 2020, 2021, 2023; Santa Monica Stakes 2006, 2007, 2010; Starlet Stakes / Hollywood Starlet Stakes 1998, 2001, 2013, 2017, 2018, 2019, 2020, 2021, 2022; Test Stakes 2008, 2012, 2020; Travers Stakes 2001, 2016, 2017; Triple Bend Stakes 2009, 2010, 2014, 2016; Whitney Stakes 2019, 2020; Wood Memorial 2001, 2006; Woodward Stakes 1999; Woody Stephens Stakes 2023; Zenyatta Stakes / Lady's Secret Stakes 2007, 2018, 2021, 2022, 2023

Racing awards
- Big Sport of Turfdom Award (1997, 2015); Eclipse Award for Outstanding Trainer (1997, 1998, 1999, 2015); United States Champion Trainer by earnings (1998, 1999, 2000, 2001)

Honors
- Lone Star Park Hall of Fame (2007); U.S. Racing Hall of Fame (2009); IFHA World's Best Racehorse (2015, 2016)

Significant horses
- Abel Tasman, American Pharoah, Arrogate, Authentic, Bayern, Behaving Badly, Bob and John, Bodemeister, Captain Steve, Charlatan, Chilukki, Citizen Bull, Congaree, Country Grammer, Dortmund, Drefong, First Dude, Forestry, Game On Dude, Hoppertunity, Indian Blessing, Justify, Lookin At Lucky, Lord Nelson, Mastery, McKinzie, Medina Spirit, Midnight Lute, Midshipman, Misremembered, Mucho Gusto, National Treasure, Nysos, Pioneerof The Nile, Point Given, Real Quiet, Secret Circle, Silverbulletday, Silver Charm, Sinister Minister, Vindication, War Emblem, West Coast, Zensational

Robert A. Baffert (born January 13, 1953) is an American racehorse trainer. He has trained two Triple Crown winners: American Pharoah in 2015 and Justify in 2018. Baffert's horses have won the Kentucky Derby six times, tying the record with Ben A. Jones for wins by a trainer. He holds the trainer record for the Preakness Stakes with eight wins and has won the Belmont Stakes and Kentucky Oaks three times each. He is a four-time winner of the Eclipse Award for Outstanding Trainer. He has also been the subject of significant controversy regarding repeated incidents of his horses failing drug tests.

== Early life and career ==
Baffert grew up on a ranch in Nogales, Arizona, where his family raised cattle and chickens. When he was 10, his father purchased some Quarter Horses, and he practiced racing them on a dirt track. In his teens, he worked as a jockey for $100 a day in informal Quarter Horse races on the outskirts of Nogales. From there, he moved to racing at recognized tracks, scoring his first victory at age 17 in 1970.

Baffert graduated from the University of Arizona's Race Track Industry Program with a Bachelor of Science degree, got married, and began training quarter horses at a Prescott, Arizona farm. By age 20, he had developed a reputation as a trainer and was hired by other trainers to run their stables. His first winner was Flipper Star at Rillito Park on January 28, 1979. In the 1980s, Baffert moved to California and worked at Los Alamitos Race Course, where he switched to training Thoroughbreds full-time in 1991. He got his first big break in 1992 when he won his first Breeder's Cup race with Thirty Slews.

Baffert established his early reputation with less expensive horses like Silver Charm and Real Quiet, bought for $16,500 and $17,000 respectively. Fellow trainer D. Wayne Lukas attributed Baffert's success to his "extraordinary eye for a good horse" and his management ability in finding the right opportunities for his charges.

== American Classic history ==
Baffert's history in the American Classic races began in 1996 when he trained a three-year-old colt named Cavonnier, who ran second in the Kentucky Derby. In 1997, he trained Silver Charm to win the Kentucky Derby and Preakness Stakes, finishing second in the Belmont. Baffert revisited the Derby the next year, sending two top colts, Real Quiet and Indian Charlie, to Louisville. Real Quiet won the race, and Baffert also finished third with Indian Charlie. Real Quiet won the Preakness as well, but, like Silver Charm, was denied a Triple Crown win and finished second in the Belmont Stakes by a nose. Baffert, however, became the first trainer in history to win both the Derby and Preakness in back-to-back years.

Baffert did not win another classic race until 2001, when he won the Preakness and Belmont Stakes with eventual Hall of Fame member Point Given. He finished third in the Derby that year with Congaree. Baffert won the Derby a third time in 2002 with War Emblem. The colt went on to win the Preakness Stakes, giving the trainer his third shot at winning the Triple Crown. War Emblem lost the Belmont Stakes after breaking poorly. Baffert did not have a horse hit the board again in any of the Triple Crown races until 2009, when he trained Pioneerof The Nile to a second-place finish in the Derby.

Baffert trained Lookin At Lucky, co-owned by Mike Pegram, to win the Preakness Stakes in 2010. The colt skipped the Belmont Stakes but became the champion three-year-old colt that year. In 2012, Baffert saddled Bodemeister, named for his youngest son, Bode, to second-place finishes in the Derby and Preakness. He saddled Paynter in the Belmont Stakes later that year, but that colt, like Bodemeister, finished second.

In 2015, Baffert trained 2014 champion two-year-old colt American Pharoah to win the Triple Crown, the first horse to do so in 37 years. In winning the 141st Kentucky Derby, bringing his total number of victories in the race to four; Baffert also ran the third-place finisher, the previously undefeated Dortmund. American Pharoah next won the 140th Preakness Stakes, making six victories in that race for Baffert, who also finished fourth with Dortmund. Then, when American Pharoah won the 2015 Belmont Stakes, the win was the fourth attempt at a Triple Crown for Baffert, who at age 62 became the second-oldest trainer to win a Triple Crown.

Baffert also trained the 2018 Triple Crown Winner, Justify and the 2020 Kentucky Derby winner, Authentic. His horse Medina Spirit, who finished first in the 2021 Kentucky Derby, was later disqualified for a medication violation. Medina Spirit's drug violation led to several racetracks suspending Baffert from entering races, including a ban of over three years by tracks owned by Churchill Downs.

== Accomplishments ==
Between 1997 and 1999, he won the Eclipse Award as outstanding trainer three years running and was voted the 1997 Big Sport of Turfdom Award. Baffert was inducted into Lone Star Park's Hall of Fame in 2007, and in 2009, he was nominated and inducted to the National Museum of Racing's Hall of Fame, the same year as a filly he trained, Silverbulletday. Point Given was nominated in 2009, but elected and inducted in 2010.

Baffert has trained horses that won seventeen American Classic Races, nineteen Breeders' Cup races, four Dubai World Cups and three Pegasus World Cups. His graded stakes wins include nine wins in the Santa Anita Derby, nine in the Haskell Invitational Handicap, ten in the Hollywood Gold Cup Stakes, and eighteen in the Del Mar Futurity, a race he won seven straight times from 1996 to 2002, when it was a Grade II event. He also won the race in 2008, 2009, 2011, 2012, 2014, 2016, 2018, 2021, 2022, 2023, and 2024 when it was run as a Grade I event. He has won the Kentucky Oaks three times: first in 1999 with Silverbulletday, who was later selected for the Hall of Fame, then with Plum Pretty in 2011 and with Abel Tasman in 2017.

Baffert has won more Breeders Cup races than any trainer, with 21 wins. He passed D. Wayne Lukas on the all time Breeders’ Cup wins list in 2025 when Nysos won the Breeders’ Cup Dirt Mile over stablemate Citizen Bull.

In 2010, Misremembered, a horse he bred, owned by his wife Jill and their friend George Jacobs, won the Santa Anita Handicap, marking Baffert's first Grade I win as a breeder instead of a trainer.

== Controversies ==
Baffert has been a subject of controversy due to multiple horses in his stables having failed drug tests. In raw numbers, most medication violations were for exceeding allowable levels on race days of various medications that are legal to be used for certain therapeutic purposes. However, his pattern of routinely challenging most sanctions, usually agreeing to accept fines but vigorously fighting suspensions, led critics such as owner and racing reform advocate Barry Irwin to state, "He's Mr. Teflon." His supporters argue that Baffert's style and personality have made him a target. Longtime client Mike Pegram explained, "Anybody who walks with that swagger, people are going to love him or hate him…he's a wiseass and irreverent." Former client Kaleem Shah said, "He will rub people the wrong way by speaking his mind, sometimes he needs to hit the mute button."

His first suspension was in 1977 for misuse of morphine, but thereafter he had no violations for eight years. Baffert came under intense scrutiny in 2013 after seven horses in his stables at Hollywood Park died between November 2, 2011, and March 14, 2013, all from sudden and unexplained heart attacks. In that period, 36% of all cardiac-related horse deaths in California were animals trained by Baffert. California's equine medical director found that Baffert's horses were routinely given Thyro-L, or thyroxine, a thyroid hormone, that could cause heart problems during exercise, but concluded that the medication, which Baffert said he had been using routinely for five years, did not cause the heart attacks. No sanctions were issued against Baffert.

One of his highest profile violations came to light In September 2019 The New York Times reported that Justify tested positive for the banned substance scopolamine after winning the Santa Anita Derby, a race the horse ran in prior to winning the Triple Crown. After extensive legal battles, in December 2023 a judge ordered stewards of the California Horse Racing Board to issue a new ruling which would effectively disqualify Justify from that win.

Other high-profile cases included the disqualification of Gamine after a third-place finish in the 2020 Kentucky Oaks for betamethasone, Cases against two horses who tested positive in Arkansas in 2020 for lidocaine were dismissed as being the result of accidental transfer from an assistant trainer who was using the medication on himself. Nonetheless, Arkansas suspended Baffert for 15 days.

The biggest case arose in 2021, when the post-race test of Kentucky Derby winner Medina Spirit showed 21pg/mL of betamethasone. In Kentucky, any amount of betamethasone detected in post-race testing is a violation and could result in a disqualification. It was also Baffert's fifth medication violation in 13 months.

At a news conference on May 9, Baffert initially claimed that Medina Spirit was never administered betamethasone, telling reporters he would fight the issue "...tooth and nail." Nonetheless, Churchill Downs suspended Baffert pending the outcome of an investigation. Baffert responded by saying the situation "was like a cancel culture kind of a thing," a remark which earned him criticism from the press. Sports Illustrated suggested that the positive drug test was a sign that Baffert's "leaking credibility" had reached "the saturation point." Next, on May 11, Baffert stated Medina Spirit had dermatitis, for which an ointment containing betamethasone was used. On June 2, 2021, Medina Spirit's split sample also tested positive and Churchill Downs suspended Baffert through the end of the 2023 Spring Meet.

On May 17, 2021, the New York Racing Association (NYRA) banned Baffert from entering Medina Spirit or any of his other horses in the 2021 Belmont Stakes or any other race at Belmont Park. On June 14, 2021, Baffert sued the NYRA, alleging that the association had no authority to suspend his license and that suspension "without prior notice" was a violation of the law. On July 14 the suspension was reversed by the U. S. Federal District Court based on the NYRA having not allowed Baffert a forum to refute their claims stating that the NYRA "had held no hearing — let alone a prompt one." On September 10, 2021, Baffert was charged by NYRA for conduct detrimental to the best interests of racing. Additional charges were added on January 3, 2022.

In February 2022, Baffert was suspended for 90 days and fined $7,500 by the Kentucky Horse Racing Commission. The suspension was scheduled to run March 8 through June 5. Baffert was granted a stay until April 4 to gain time for an appeal. However, the Kentucky Court of Appeals rejected the appeal on April 1. This led to a ban from all California Horse Racing Board facilities beginning April 4 due to a rule removing any trainer under a 60-day or higher ban from all CHRB facilities. Further, the 90-day ban against Baffert in Kentucky was set to be honored in all 38 racing states.

Controversy deepened on December 6, 2021, when Medina Spirit died of an apparent heart attack after a workout at Santa Anita Park. This reminded the public that since 2000, at least 74 other horses had died while in Baffert's stables. Though the number of racing starts is used to calculate rates of death for all horses in the care of trainers, not all horse deaths were animals in race training nor were they necessarily race-related fatalities.

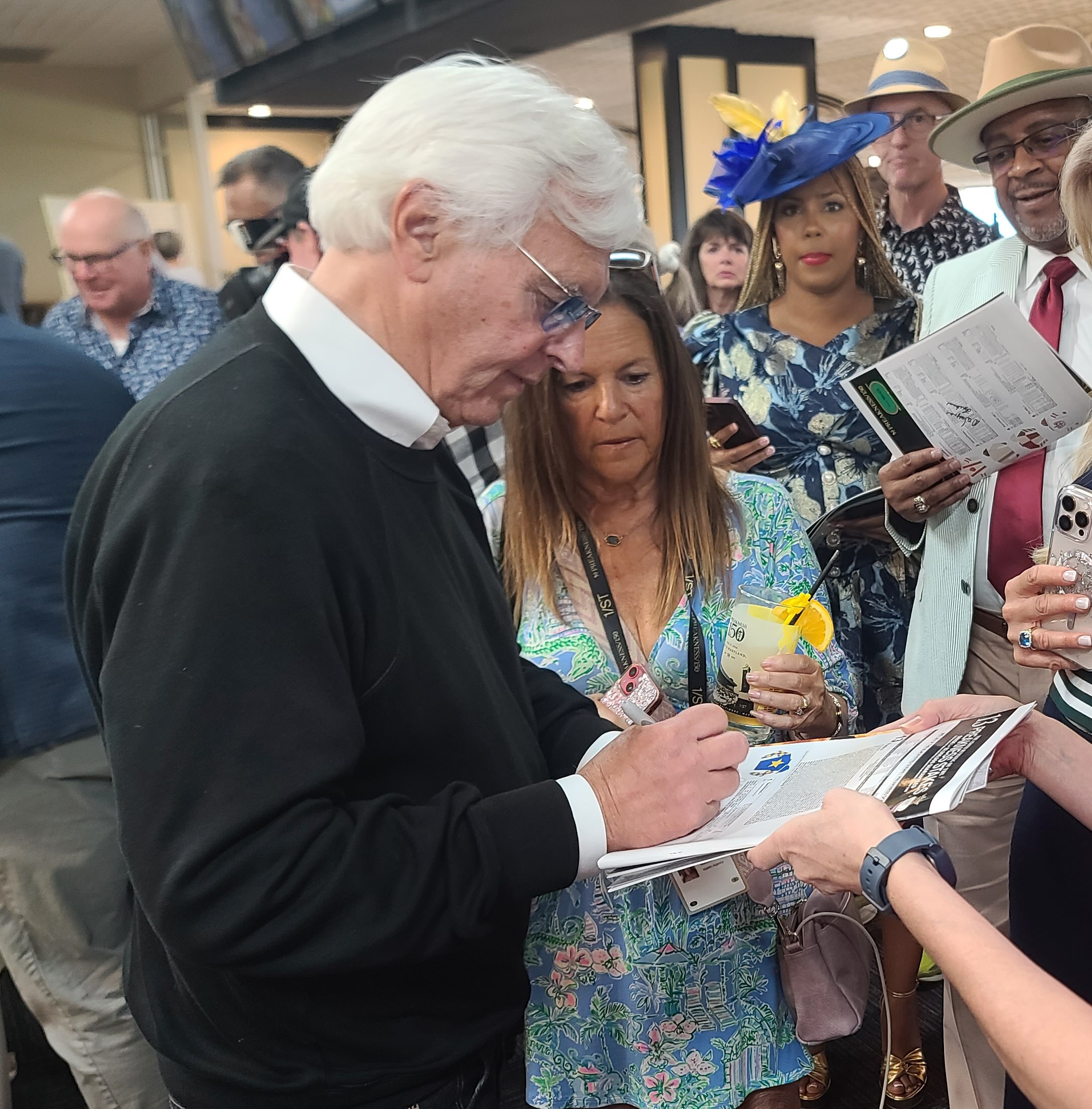
Bob Baffert signs autographs at the Alibi Breakfast at Pimlico Racetrack, two days before the 150th running of the Preakness Stakes, the last held at the original grandstand on May 15, 2025.

Baffert's ban at Churchill Downs' racetracks was extended in July 2023. One year later, in July 2024, Churchill Downs rescinded the ban after Baffert issued a statement accepting responsibility for Medina Spirit's drug positive and for any substance found in the horses that he trained. "I have paid a very steep price with a three-year suspension and the disqualification of Medina Spirit’s performance," he said, adding that he was "committed to having an amicable resolution with Churchill Downs in order to have the opportunity to compete again for the Triple Crown."

== Personal life ==
Baffert has been married twice and has five children: four with his first wife, Sherry. He married his second wife, Jill, a former television reporter based in Louisville, in 2002. They had a son in 2004. Baffert and his family reside in California.

Baffert survived a heart attack in late March 2012 while in Dubai conditioning Game On Dude to compete in the Dubai World Cup.

Following the 2015 Belmont win, Baffert outlined several charities that he and his wife Jill supported. He had been paid $200,000 to allow the Burger King to stand behind him in the grandstand during the televised broadcast of the Belmont, after having turned down $150,000 to allow the mascot to appear with him at the Preakness. At the post-Belmont press conference, Baffert announced he and his wife would be making donations of $50,000 each to the Thoroughbred Aftercare Alliance, the California Retirement Management Account (CARMA), and Old Friends Equine, all programs for retired race horses; and to the Permanently Disabled Jockey's Fund in memory of a Quarter Horse Jockey named Robert Z. "Bobby" Adair. A friend of Baffert's and an inductee into the American Quarter Horse Association Hall of Fame, Adair died on Preakness Day, May 16, 2015, at 71. Baffert dedicated American Pharoah's win to Adair.
