= Lone Star Park =

Horse racing track in Texas, United States

Coordinates: 32°46′25″N 96°59′11″W

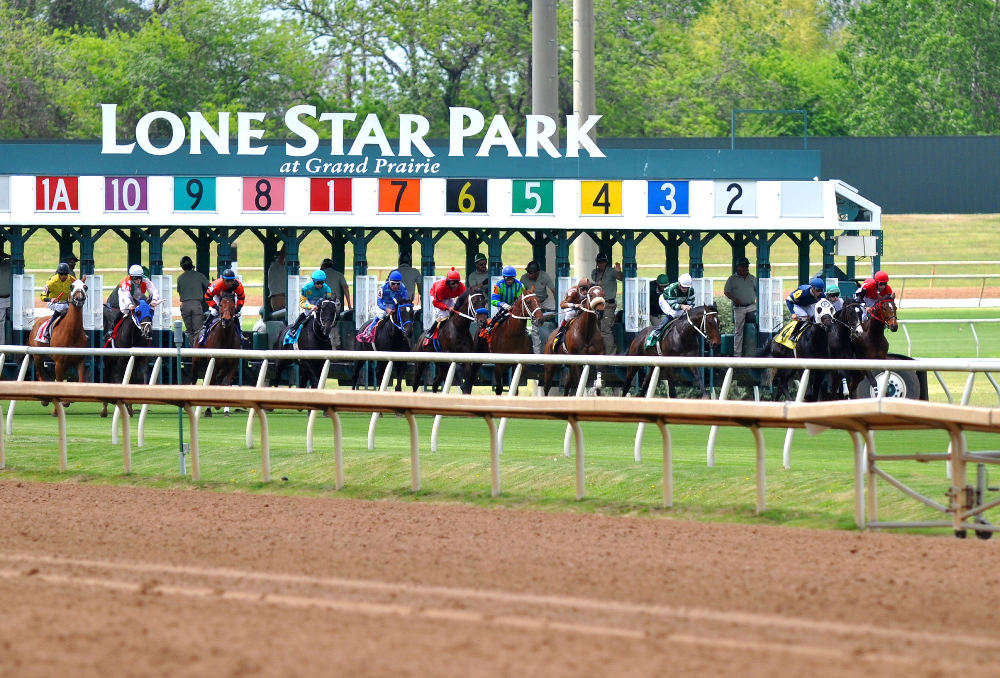
- Horses starting out of the gate at Lone Star Park
- Interactive map of Lone Star Park
- Location: Grand Prairie, Texas, United States
- Owned by: Global Gaming Solutions, LLC
- Date opened: 1997
- Race type: Thoroughbred and Quarter Horse

Lone Star Park is a horse racing track and entertainment destination located 1/2 mile north of Interstate 30 on Belt Line Road in Grand Prairie, Texas, United States. It has two live racing seasons every year; the spring Thoroughbred season generally runs from early April through mid-July, and the Fall Meeting of Champions generally runs from early September through mid-November.

== History ==
In 1992, Grand Prairie voters approved a half-cent sales tax to assist in financial bonds to build a racetrack. Shortly thereafter, the city created a sports authority (the Grand Prairie Sports Facilities Development Corp.), which would own the track and lease it to a track operator.

== Physical attributes ==
Lone Star Park covers 315 acres (1.27 km^{2}), and includes Bar & Book for simulcasting of racing worldwide. The track has a one-mile (1.6 km) dirt oval and a seven-furlong turf track, and has accommodations for 1,600 horses across 32 barns. The climate-controlled grandstand has a seating capacity of roughly 8,000 people.

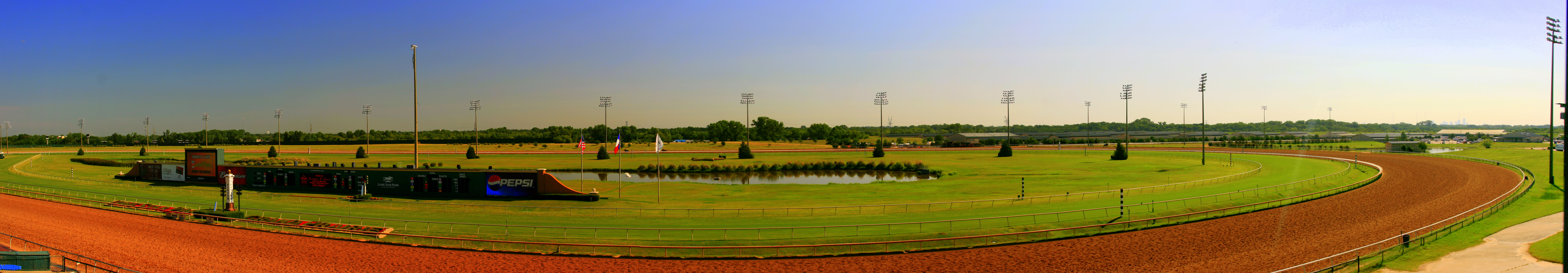
A panoramic photo of Lone Star Park.

== Personalities ==
- Dave Appleton, paddock host (1997–present)
- Rick Lee, track Handicapper (1998–present)
- Jim Byers, track announcer (2016–Unknown)
- "Railbird" Rodney Nelson, Handicapper/Paddock Host (2018-present)

== Production staff ==
- John Marsh, video production manager

== Racing ==
Due to the popularity of many different horse breeds in the state of Texas, half of the races are set up for more than just thoroughbreds.

=== Graded events ===
Thoroughbred races: Grade III

- Steve Sexton Mile Stakes – $400,000 guaranteed – 3 yo & up | 1 mile

Quarter horse:

Grade I

- Texas Classic Futurity – $1,000,000 estimated – 2 yo | 400 yards
- Texas Classic Derby – $400,000 estimated – 3 yo | 440 yards
- Refrigerator Handicap – $75,000-Guaranteed – 3 yo & up | 440 yards

Grade II

- Dash For Cash Futurity – $450,000 estimated – 2 yo | 400 yards

Grade III

- Dash For Cash Derby – $175,000 estimated – 3 yo | 440 yards
- B. F. Phillips Jr. Stakes Restricted Texas-Bred – $25,000 guaranteed – 3 yo & up | 400 yards

Paint and Appaloosa:

Grade I

- Speedhorse Lone Star Paint and Appaloosa Futurity – $100,000 estimated – 2 yo | 400 yards

Other Stakes Races

Thoroughbred

- Texas Derby - $300,000 guaranteed - 3 yo - | 1 1/16 miles
- Ouja Board Distaff - $200,000 guaranteed - F&M 3 yo & up - | 1 mile Turf
- Chamberlain Bridge Stakes - $100,000 guaranteed - 3 yo & up - | 5 Furlongs Turf
- Memorial Day Sprint - $100,000 guaranteed - F&M 3 yo & up - | 6 Furlongs
- Speightstown Sprint - )100,000 guaranteed - 3 yo & up - | 6 Furlongs
- Texas Horse Racing Hall of Fame Stakes TX-Bred, 3 YO & Up One Mile & One-Sixteenth (Turf) $75,000 Added
- Texas Turf Classic 3 YO & Up One Mile & One-Eighth (Turf) $300,000 Guaranteed
- Wasted Tears Stakes Fillies & Mares, 3 YO & Up One Mile & One-Sixteenth (Turf) $150,000 Guaranteed
- Grand Prairie Turf Sprint 3 YO & Up Five Furlongs (Turf) $150,000 Guaranteed
- Chicken Fried Stakes Fillies & Mares, 3 YO & Up Five Furlongs (Turf) $150,000 Guaranteed
- Assault Stakes – Restricted Texas-Bred – $75,000 guaranteed – 3 yo & up | 1 mile
- Bluebonnet Stakes – Restricted Texas-Bred – $75,000 guaranteed – 3 yo & up | 6 1/2 furlongs
- Wayne Hanks Memorial Stakes – Restricted Texas-Bred – $75,000 guaranteed – fillies & mares, 3 yo & up | 6 1/2 furlongs
- Nevill Stakes – Restricted Texas-Bred – $20,000 estimated – 3 yo & up | 350 yards
- Danny Shifflett Scholarship Stakes TX-Bred, Fillies & Mares, 3 YO & Up Seven & One-Half Furlongs (Turf) $75,000 Added
- Texas Stallion Stakes (Pan Zareta Division) Fillies, 2 YO Five Furlongs $75,000 Added
- Texas Stallion Stakes (Staunch Avenger Division) Colts & Geldings, 2 YO Five Furlongs $75,000 Added
- Texas Horse Racing Hall of Fame Stakes TX-Bred, 3 YO & Up One Mile & One-Sixteenth (Turf) $75,000 Added
- Valor Farm Stakes TX-Bred, Fillies & Mares, 3 YO & Up Six Furlongs $75,000 Added
- Texas Thoroughbred Association Futurity (Filly Division) Fillies, 2 YO Five & One-Half Furlongs $150,000 Guaranteed
- Texas Thoroughbred Association Futurity (Colt & Gelding Division) Colts & Geldings, 2 YO Five & One-Half Furlongs $150,000 Guaranteed
- Fiesta Mile TX-Bred, Fillies & Mares, 3 YO & Up One Mile (Turf) $75,000 Added

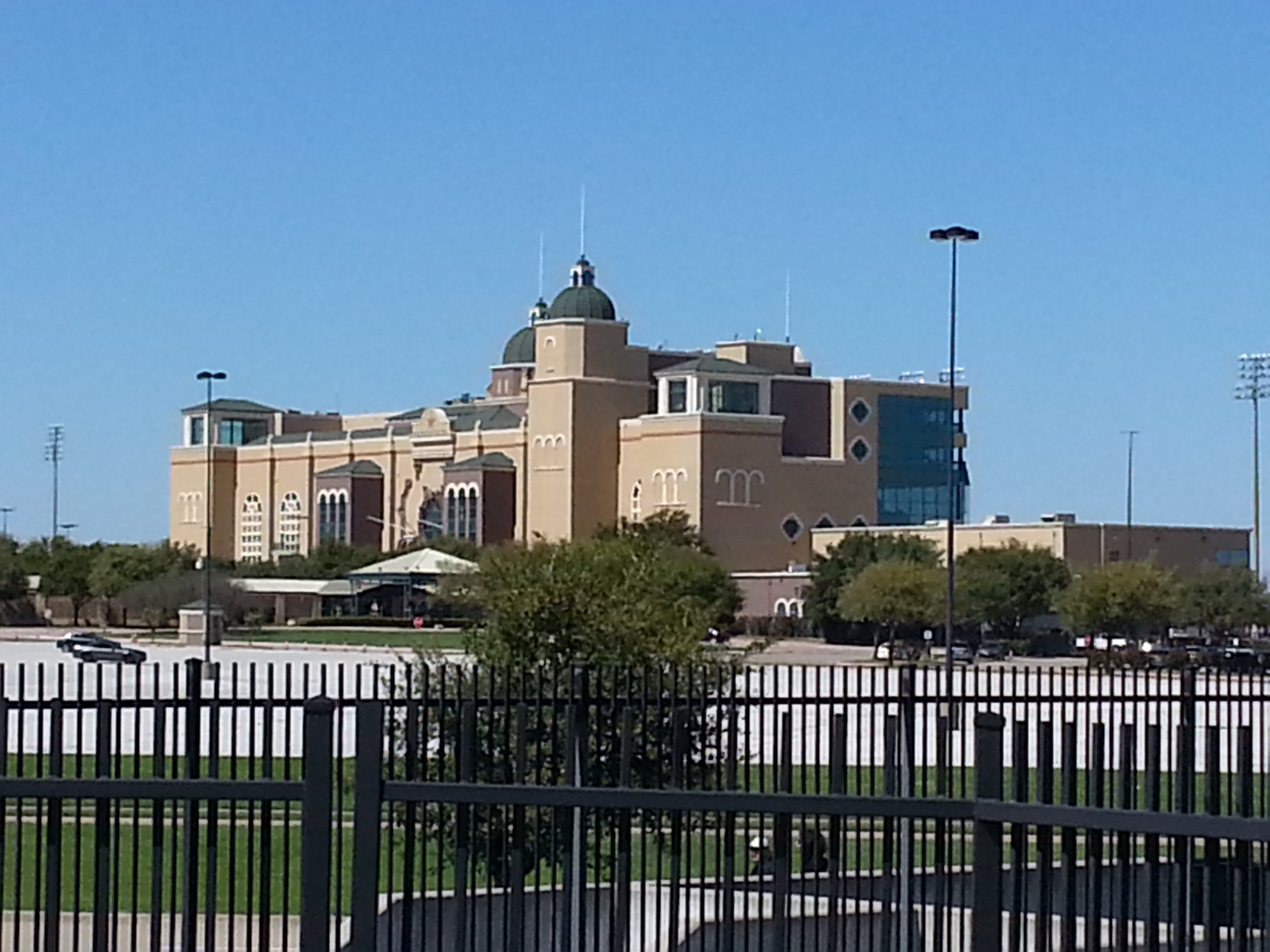
Exterior of Lone Star Park

- Masterpiece Challenge Paint and Appaloosa Stakes – Listed – $20,000 estimated – 3 yo | 400 yards

Arabians:

- Dubai International Arabian Races Texas Open Stakes – $30,000 guaranteed – 3 yo & up | 1 & 1/16 mile
- Shadwell Arabian Stallions Texas Distaff Stakes – $30,000 guaranteed – fillies & mares, 3 yo & up | 8 furlongs
- www.shadwellarabian.co.uk Texas Lone Star Futurity – $20,000 guaranteed – fillies, 3 yo | 6 furlongs
- DIAR Texas Lone Star Futurity – $20,000 guaranteed – colts & geldings, 3 yo | 6 furlongs

== In popular culture ==
- On Walker, Texas Ranger, the episode "Rainbow's End" (from Season 6) had one of the titular Texas Ranger's (Chuck Norris) cases taking place here. The episode centers on Walker, Trivette (Clarence Gilyard Jr.) and Alex (Sheree J. Wilson) building a case against a corrupt racehorse owner named James Lee Crown (Randolph Mantooth) for killing a rival racehorse and its owner and trainer (the latter of whom secretly working for Crown), and protecting the titular racehorse-- who is owned by one of Walker's close friends (John Beck) and his daughter (Lea Moreno)-- from becoming Crown's next victim.
