= Stonerside Stable =

Coordinates: 38.198°N 84.196°W

Stonerside Stable is an American Thoroughbred horse breeding farm and horse racing operation near Paris, Kentucky. Until September 2008 it was owned by Robert and Janice McNair, who also owned the National Football League team, the Houston Texans. They sold the highly successful operation to the Darley racing conglomerate of Sheikh Mohammed of Dubai.

Stonerside Stable was a finalist for the Eclipse Award for Outstanding Breeder for 2008.
