= Maxfield Stakes =

- Class: Grade III
- Location: Churchill Downs; Louisville, Kentucky, United States
- Inaugurated: 2022 (as Maxfield Overnight Stakes)
- Race type: Thoroughbred - Flat racing
- Website: www.churchilldowns.com

Race information
- Distance: 7 furlongs
- Surface: dirt
- Track: left-handed
- Qualification: Three-year-olds
- Weight: 123 lbs with allowances
- Purse: $250,000 (2026)

The Maxfield Stakes is a Grade III American Thoroughbred horse race for three-year-olds over a distance seven furlongs on the dirt scheduled annually in late June at Churchill Downs in Louisville, Kentucky.

== History ==
The event was named after Godolphin's Maxfield, who earned $2,001,812 from a record of 8-2-1 in 11 starts for trainer Brendan Walsh between 2019 and 2021. Maxfield, a Kentucky-bred son of 2007 Kentucky Derby winner Street Sense, was a two-time Grade I winner. As a two-year-old, Maxfield won the 2019 Breeders' Futurity Stakes and won his career finale in the $750,000 Clark Stakes at Churchill Downs in 2021. Maxfield is the first horse to sweep Churchill Downs’ Alysheba Stakes, Stephen Foster Stakes and Clark Stakes in a calendar year.

The event was inaugurated on July 3, 2022, as the Maxfield Overnight Stakes over a distance of seven furlongs and was won by Winchell Thoroughbreds' Gunite, who started as the short 9/10 odds-on favorite winning by a length holding off My Prankster in a time of 1:23.08. Gunite was racing in his ninth start and was ridden by jockey Tyler Gaffalione. Later in his career Gunite would win the Grade I Forego Stakes at Saratoga.

In 2023 the event was moved to Ellis Park after Churchill Downs closed their spring meeting earlier due to a spate of injuries.

In 2024 the event was run as the Maxfield Stakes with Listed Status.

After two runnings of the event with Listed status, in 2026 the event was upgraded to Grade III by the Thoroughbred Owners and Breeders Association.

== Records ==
Speed record:

- 7 furlongs: 1:20.77 – Verifire (2025)

Margins:

- 5 3/4 lengths – Deep Flame (2026)

Most wins by a jockey:

- No jockey has no more than one win

Most wins by a trainer:

- 2 – Steven M. Asmussen (2022, 2023)
- 2 – Brad H. Cox (2025, 2026)

Most wins by an owner:

- No owner has no more than one win

== Winners ==
Year	Winner	Jockey	Trainer	Owner	Distance	Time	Purse	Grade	Ref
At Churchill Downs – Maxfield Stakes
2026	Deep Flame	Irad Ortiz Jr.	Brad H. Cox	Juddmonte Farms	7 furlongs	1:21.43	$250,000	III	
2025	Verifier	Flavien Prat	Brad H. Cox	Resolute Racing	7 furlongs	1:20.77	$239,665	Listed	
Maxfield Overnight Stakes
2024	Raging Torrent	Antonio Fresu	Doug O'Neill	Mark D. Davis	7 furlongs	1:22.04	$173,700	Listed	
At Ellis Park
2023	Ryvit	Cristian Torres	Steven M. Asmussen	Corinne & William L. Heiligbrodt	7 furlongs	1:22.33	$171,100		
At Churchill Downs
2022	Gunite	Tyler Gaffalione	Steven M. Asmussen	Winchell Thoroughbreds	7 furlongs	1:23.08	$160,000		

== See also ==
- List of American and Canadian Graded races
