= Stephen Foster Handicap top three finishers =

This is a listing of the horses that finished in either first, second, or third place and the number of starters in the Stephen Foster Handicap, an American Grade 1 race for age three and up at 1-1/8 miles on the dirt held at Churchill Downs in Louisville, Kentucky.

| Year | Winner | Second | Third | Starters |
|---|---|---|---|---|
| 2026 | | | | |
| 2025 | Mindframe | Sierra Leone | First Mission | 6 |
| 2024 | Kingsbarns | Pyrenees | Skippylongstocking | 8 |
| 2023 | West Will Power | Rattle N Roll | Happy American | 8 |
| 2022 | Olympiad | Americanrevolution | Proxy | 7 |
| 2021 | Maxfield | Warrior's Charge | Sprawl | 9 |
| 2020 | Toms d'Etat | By My Standards | Sliver Dust | 8 |
| 2019 | Seeking The Soul | Quip | Toms d'Etat | 12 |
| 2018 | Pavel | Honorable Duty | Matrooh | 9 |
| 2017 | Gun Runner | Honorable Duty | Breaking Lucky | 8 |
| 2016 | Bradester | Eagle | Majestic Harbor | 7 |
| 2015 | Noble Bird | Lea | Hoppertunity | 7 |
| 2014 | Moonshine Mullins | Will Take Charge | Departing | 9 |
| 2013 | Fort Larned | Golden Ticket | Ron the Greek | 6 |
| 2012 | Ron the Greek | Wise Dan | Nates Mineshaft | 8 |
| 2011 | Pool Play | Mission Impazible | Apart | 10 |
| 2010 | Blame | Battle Plan | General Quarters | 11 |
| 2009 | Macho Again | Asiatic Boy | Einstein | 8 |
| 2008 | Curlin | Einstein | Barcola | 10 |
| 2007 | Flashy Bull | Magna Graduate | Diamond Stripes | 8 |
| 2006 | Seek Gold | Perfect Drift | West Virginia | 9 |
| 2005 | Saint Liam | Eurosilver | Perfect Drift | 8 |
| 2004 | Colonial Colony | Southern Image | Perfect Drift | 6 |
| 2003 | Perfect Drift | Mineshaft | Aldebaran | 10 |
| 2002 | Street Cry | Dollar Bill | Tenpins | 8 |
| 2001 | Guided Tour | Captain Steve | Brahms | 8 |
| 2000 | Golden Missile | Ecton Park | Cat Thief | 6 |
| 1999 | Victory Gallop | Nite Dreamer | Littlebitlively | 7 |
| 1998 | Awesome Again | Silver Charm | Semoran | 7 |
| 1997 | City by Night | Victor Cooley | Semoran | 6 |
| 1996 | Tenants Harbor | Pleasant Tango | Mt. Sassafras | 8 |
| 1995 | Recoup the Cash | Tyus | Powerful Punch | 9 |
| 1994 | Recoup the Cash | Taking Risks | Dignitas | 7 |
| 1993 | Root Boy | Discover | Flying Continental | 11 |
| 1992 | Discover | Barkerville | Classic Seven | 13 |
| 1991 | Black Tie Affair | Private School | Greydar | 5 |
| 1990 | No Marker | Western Playboy | Lucky Peach | 10 |
| 1989 | Air Worthy | J. T.'s Pet | Present Value | 9 |
| 1988 | Honor Medal | Outlaws Sham | Momsfurrari | 10 |
| 1987 | Red Attack | Sir Naskra | Blue Buckaroo | 9 |
| 1986 | Hopeful Word | Dramatic Desire | Ten Gold Pots | 7 |
| 1985 | Vanlandingham | Manantial | Sovereign Exchange | 7 |
| 1984 | Mythical Ruler | Fairly Straight | Le Cou Cou | 5 |
| 1983 | Vodika Collins | Mythical Ruler | Northern Majesty | 7 |
| 1982 | Vodika Collins | Mythical Ruler | Two's a Plenty | 7 |

== See also ==
- Churchill Downs
- List of graded stakes at Churchill Downs
