= Colonel E.R. Bradley Handicap =

- Class: Grade III
- Location: Fair Grounds Race Course; New Orleans, Louisiana
- Race type: Thoroughbred - Flat racing
- Website: www.fairgroundsracecourse.com

Race information
- Distance: 1 1/16 mile
- Surface: Turf
- Track: left-handed
- Qualification: Four-year-olds and older
- Purse: $100,000 (2022)

The Colonel E.R. Bradley Handicap is an American Thoroughbred horse race run at the Fair Grounds Race Course in New Orleans, Louisiana at the beginning of the year. A Grade III stakes race for four-year-olds and up, it's set at a distance of 1 and 1/16 of a mile on the turf and currently offers a purse of $100,000.

The Col. E.R. Bradley is named for Edward R. Bradley, the founder of Idle Hour Stock Farm. Bradley and Idle Hour established first class breeding in his area through his stallion Black Toney and one of America's preeminent “blue hen” mares, La Troienne.

This race was one of the many not run in 2006 due to Hurricane Katrina.

== Past winners ==
- 2023 - Gentle Soul (Reylu Gutierrez) (1:48.82)
- 2022 - Forty Under (Mitchell Murrill) (1:43.45)
- 2017 - Grannys Kitten (Miguel Mena) (1:43.61)
- 2016 - Chocolate Ride (Florent Geroux) (1:43.21)
- 2015 - String King (James Graham)
- 2014 - Daddy Nose Best (Rosie Napravnik)
- 2013 - Optimizer (Jon Court)
- 2012 - Mr. Vegas (Miguel Mena)
- 2011 - Gran Estreno (Rosie Napravnik)
- 2010 - El Caballo (Robby Albarado) French Beret (James Graham)
- 2008-2009 – French Beret (James Graham)
- 2007 – Purim (Grade I winner.) (Cloudy's Night, a stakes winner until 7, came in third.)
- 2006 – NOT RUN
- 2005 – Onthedeanslist (Corey Lanerie)
- 2004 – Skate Away (Gerard Melancon)
- 2003 – Royal Spy (Robby Albarado) (Freeforinternet came in third.)
- 2002 – Northcote Road (Larry Melancon)
- 2001 – Cornish Snow (Larry Melancon)
- 2000 – Rod And Staff (Robby Albarado)
- 1999-Baytown (Curt C. Bourque)
- 1998- Joyeux Danseur (Robby Albarado)
- 1997- Snake Eyes (Robby Albarado)
- 1996- Kumhwa (Gerard Melancon)
- 1995- Pride of Summer (Robert King, Jr.)
- 1992-1994- Dixie Poker Ace (Calvin H. Borel)
- 1991 Sangria Time (David Guillory)
- 1990 Majesty's Imp (Elvis Joseph Perrodin)
- 1989 Ingot's Ruler (Ronald D. Ardoin)
- 1988 Zuppardo's Love (Jon Kenton Court)
- 1987 NOT RUN
- 1986 NOT RUN
- 1985 NOT RUN
- 1984 Dugan Knight (Richard Miglior)
