= 2013 Belmont Stakes =

American horse race

145th Belmont Stakes
- Belmont Stakes
- "The Test of the Champion"
- Location: Belmont Park; Elmont, New York, U.S.
- Date: June 8, 2013
- Distance: 1 1/2 mi (12 furlongs; 2,414 m)
- Winning horse: Palace Malice
- Winning time: 2:30.70
- Final odds: 13.80 (to 1)
- Jockey: Mike E. Smith
- Trainer: Todd Pletcher
- Owner: Dogwood Stables
- Conditions: Fast
- Surface: Dirt
- Attendance: 47,562

The 2013 Belmont Stakes was the 145th running of the Belmont Stakes, the third jewel in the Triple Crown of Thoroughbred Racing. The race was held on June 8, 2013. For the third consecutive year, the race was run without the Triple Crown being at stake as 2013 Kentucky Derby winner Orb was defeated in the 2013 Preakness Stakes by Oxbow.

The race was won by Palace Malice in 2:30.70. Oxbow finished second, Orb third, Incognito fourth, Revolutionary fifth and the filly Unlimited Budget was sixth.

The official attendance was 47,562.

== Payout ==
The Belmont Stakes Payout Schedule

| Program Number | Horse Name | Win | Place | Show |
|---|---|---|---|---|
| 12 | Palace Malice | US$29.60 | $11.20 | $6.70 |
| 7 | Oxbow | – | $9.90 | $6.10 |
| 5 | Orb | – | – | $3.90 |

- $2 Exacta: (12-7) $323.50
- $2 Trifecta: (12-7-5) $931.00
- $1 Superfecta: (12-7-5-6) $10,301.00

== Field ==
Both the Kentucky Derby winner Orb and the Preakness Stakes winner Oxbow entered the race. This was the 21st time that the winner of the Kentucky Derby and the winner of the Preakness Stakes competed in the race. A total of fourteen horses entered the race, tying for the second-largest field for the third time in the race's history.

Orb was the morning line favorite. Trainer Todd Pletcher entered a record 5 horses in the race, including the filly Unlimited Budget who was attempting to become the second filly to win the race in the modern era after Pletcher's 2007 winner Rags to Riches. Ridden by Rosie Napravnik, who in doing so, became the first woman jockey to ride all three Triple Crown races in a single year, the filly-and-female-jockey story garnered considerable press.

== Race ==
Oxbow held the lead late into the race until Palace Malice passed him with a quarter-mile to go. Palace Malice eventually won by 3 1/4 lengths. Orb made a run from back in the pack and finished third.

| Finish | Post | Horse | Jockey | Morning Line Odds | Final Odds | Winnings |
|---|---|---|---|---|---|---|
| 1 | 12 | Palace Malice | Mike E. Smith | 15-1 | 13.80 | $600,000 |
| 2 | 7 | Oxbow | Gary Stevens | 5-1 | 10.10 | $200,000 |
| 3 | 5 | Orb | Joel Rosario | 3-1 | 2.20 | $110,000 |
| 4 | 6 | Incognito | Irad Ortiz Jr. | 20-1 | 18.20 | $60,000 |
| 5 | 9 | Revolutionary | Javier Castellano | 9-2 | 5.30 | $30,000 |
| 6 | 13 | Unlimited Budget | Rosie Napravnik | 8-1 | 14.30 | |
| 7 | 3 | Overanalyze | John R. Velazquez | 12-1 | 10.30 | |
| 8 | 11 | Vyjack | Julien Leparoux | 20-1 | 24.25 | |
| 9 | 14 | Golden Soul | Robby Albarado | 10-1 | 11.90 | |
| 10 | 10 | Will Take Charge | Jon Court | 20-1 | 22.10 | |
| 11 | 4 | Giant Finish | Edgar Prado | 30-1 | 32.25 | |
| 12 | 8 | Midnight Taboo | Garrett K. Gomez | 30-1 | 30.25 | |
| 13 | 2 | Freedom Child | Luis Saez | 8-1 | 8.10 | |
| 14 | 1 | Frac Daddy | Alan Garcia | 30-1 | 30.50 | |

- Margins – 3 1/4 lengths, 1 3/4 lengths
- Time – 2:30.70
- Track – Fast
