= Matt Winn Stakes =

- Class: Grade III Stakes
- Location: Churchill Downs; Louisville, Kentucky, U.S.
- Inaugurated: 2002
- Race type: Thoroughbred – Flat racing
- Website: www.churchilldowns.com

Race information
- Distance: 1 1/16 miles
- Surface: Dirt
- Track: left-handed
- Qualification: Three-year-olds
- Weight: 123 lbs with allowances
- Purse: US$400,000 (since 2023)

The Matt Winn Stakes is a Grade III American Thoroughbred horse race for three-year-old horses run over a distance of 1 1/16 miles on the dirt at Churchill Downs in Louisville, Kentucky. The event currently offers a purse of $400,000. It is usually run in mid-June but in 2020 was moved up to mid-May. In 2027, the race will move to July as part of a new six-race championship series between the track and New York Racing Association.

== History ==
The race was inaugurated in 2002 in honor Kentucky Derby and Churchill Downs's Col. Matt Winn, who served as president and general manager of the historic track from 1902 to 1949. Known by the media as "Mr. Derby," Winn is credited with building the Kentucky Derby into America's greatest race and one of the world's great sports events. The inaugural running was over a distance of six furlongs.

In 2009 the distance was set at 7 furlongs. In 2011, it was changed to its current 1 1/16 miles.

In 2011 the event was upgraded to Grade III status.

In 2020 as a result of the coronavirus pandemic, the event was rescheduled to May 23 from its normal date in mid-June. The race was added to the 2020 Road to the Kentucky Derby as a result of the rescheduling of that race.

In 2023 the event was moved to Ellis Park after Churchill Downs closed their spring meeting earlier due to a spate of injuries. The distance of the event was increased to 1 1/8 miles.

In August 2026, it was announced the race will move to July 2027 as part of the Thoroughbred Championship Series, as the third of six rounds of the championship, and the second of three rounds at Churchill Downs, with a Championship Race at the track to be slotted in late September.

== Records ==
Speed Record:

- 1 1/16 miles: 1:41.12 – Gun Runner (2016)
- 1 1/8 miles: 1:49.59 – Disarm (2023)

Margins:

- 7 1/4 lengths – Neck 'n Neck (2012)

Most wins by a jockey

- 3 – Florent Geroux (2016, 2021, 2022)

Most wins by a trainer

- 6 – Steve Asmussen (2003, 2005, 2010, 2014, 2016, 2023)

Most wins by an Owner

- 3 – Winchell Thoroughbreds (2014, 2016, 2023)

== Winners ==
Year	Winner	Jockey	Trainer	Owner	Distance	Time	Purse	Grade	Ref
At Churchill Downs
2026	Further Ado	Irad Ortiz Jr.	Brad H. Cox	Spendthrift Farm	1 1/16 miles	1:41.26	$500,000	III	
2025	East Avenue	Luis Saez	Brendan P. Walsh	Godolphin Racing	1 1/16 miles	1:42.12	$387,000	III	
2024	Society Man	Corey J. Lanerie	Danny Gargan	Reeves Thoroughbred Racing, West Paces Racing, GMP Stables, Carl F. & Yurie Pascarella	1 1/16 miles	1:42.33	$395,000	III	
At Ellis Park
2023	Disarm	Joel Rosario	Steven M. Asmussen	Winchell Thoroughbreds	1 1/8 miles	1:49.59	$400,000	III	
At Churchill Downs
2022	Cyberknife	Florent Geroux	Brad H. Cox	Gold Square LLC	1 1/16 miles	1:41.98	$225,000	III	
2021	Fulsome	Florent Geroux	Brad H. Cox	Juddmonte	1 1/16 miles	1:42.88	$150,000	III	
2020	Maxfield	José L. Ortiz	Brendan P. Walsh	Godolphin	1 1/16 miles	1:43.05	$150,000	III	
2019	Mr. Money	Gabriel Saez	W. Bret Calhoun	Allied Racing Stable	1 1/16 miles	1:42.28	$150,000	III	
2018	King Zachary	Robby Albarado	Dale L. Romans	Thomas F. Conway	1 1/16 miles	1:42.86	$100,000	III	
2017	McCraken	Brian Hernandez Jr.	Ian R. Wilkes	Whitham Thoroughbreds	1 1/16 miles	1:43.24	$100,000	III	
2016	Gun Runner	Florent Geroux	Steven M. Asmussen	Winchell Thoroughbreds, Three Chimneys Farm & Besilu Stable	1 1/16 miles	1:41.12	$100,000	III	
2015	Island Town	Julien R. Leparoux	Ian R. Wilkes	Six Column Stables et al.	1 1/16 miles	1:43.46	$100,000	III	
2014	Tapiture	Rosie Napravnik	Steven M. Asmussen	Winchell Thoroughbreds	1 1/16 miles	1:43.99	$109,400	III	
2013	Code West	Rosie Napravnik	Bob Baffert	Gary & Mary West	1 1/16 miles	1:43.37	$113,100	III	
2012	Neck 'n Neck	Leandro D. Goncalves	Ian R. Wilkes	A. Steven Miles Jr.	1 1/16 miles	1:43.72	$107,100	III	
2011	Scotus	Alan Garcia	Kenneth G. McPeek	Peter Callahan	1 1/16 miles	1:44.12	$138,500	III	
2010	Thiskyhasnolimit	Shaun Bridgmohan	Steven M. Asmussen	Cathy & Bob Zollars & Mark Wagner	7 furlongs	1:22.29	$108,000	Listed	
2009	Capt. Candyman Can	Javier Castellano	Ian R. Wilkes	Joseph Rauch & David Zell	7 furlongs	1:22.89	$106,900	Listed	
2008	Eaton's Gift	Elvis Trujillo	Dale L. Romans	Zayat Stables	6 furlongs	1:09.48	$108,800	Listed	
2007	Spin Master	Miguel Mena	Dale L. Romans	Eldon Farm	6 furlongs	1:08.30	$108,500	Listed	
2006	Changing Weather	Robby Albarado	Eoin G. Harty	Darley Racing	6 furlongs	1:09.86	$109,800	Listed	
2005	Razor	Mike E. Smith	Steven M. Asmussen	Padua Stables	6 furlongs	1:09.48	$109,700	Listed	
2004	Fire Slam	Pat Day	David M. Carroll	Stan E. Fulton	6 furlongs	1:09.64	$103,499	Listed	
2003	Posse	Corey J. Lanerie	Steven M. Asmussen	Heiligbrodt Racing Stable	6 furlongs	1:09.43	$111,400	Listed	
2002	Day Trader	Calvin H. Borel	D. Wayne Lukas	Overbrook Farm	6 furlongs	1:09.43	$109,600	Listed	

== See also ==
- List of American and Canadian Graded races
