= Speightstown (horse) =

American-bred Thoroughbred racehorse (1998–2023

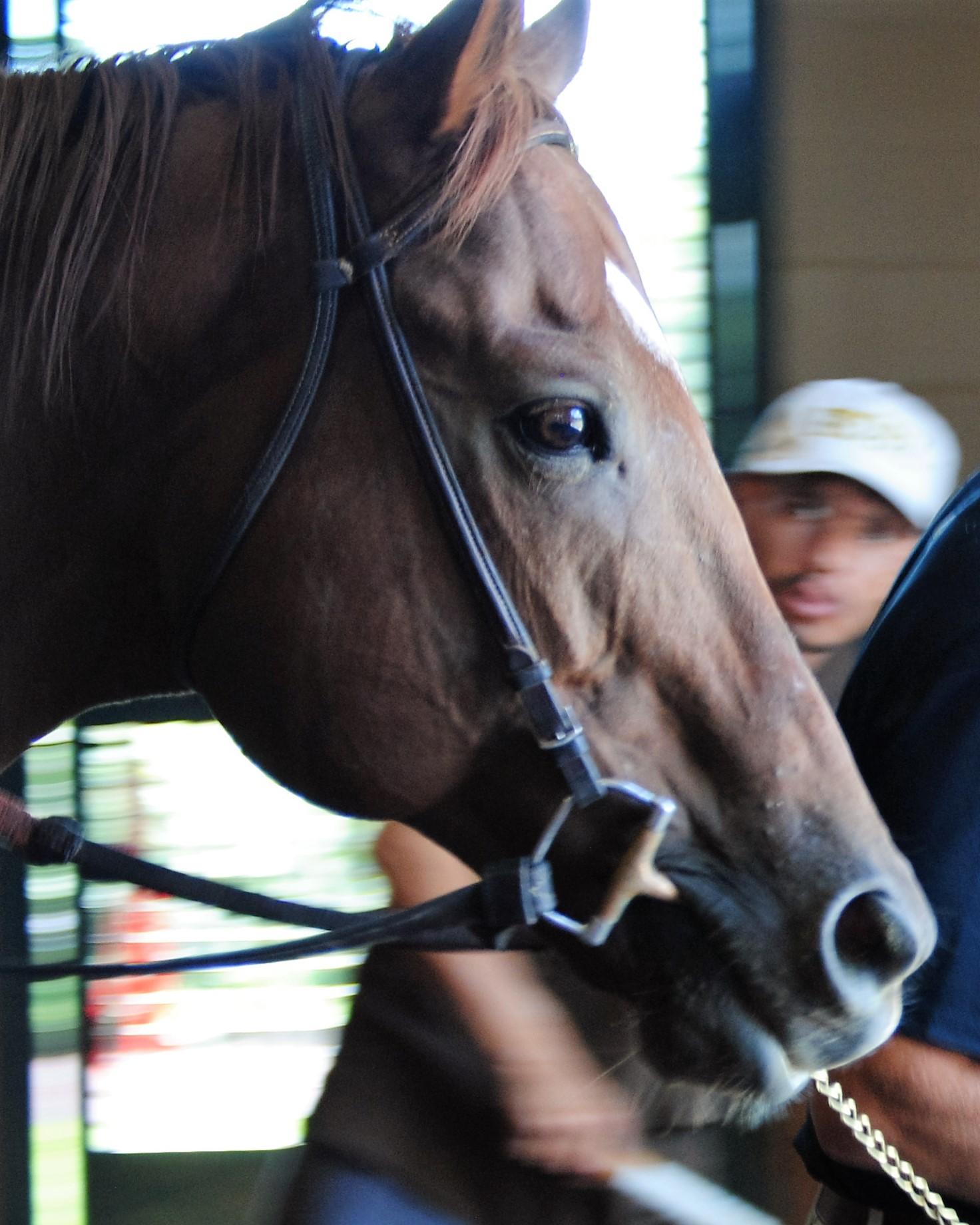
- Speightstown at WinStar Farm
- Sire: Gone West
- Grandsire: Mr. Prospector
- Dam: Silken Cat
- Damsire: Storm Cat
- Sex: Colt
- Foaled: February 1, 1998
- Died: December 8, 2023 (aged 25)
- Country: United States
- Colour: Chestnut
- Breeder: Aaron & Marie Jones
- Owner: Eugene and Laura Melnyk
- Trainer: Todd Pletcher
- Record: 16: 10–2–2
- Earnings: $1,258,256

Major wins
- Churchill Downs Handicap; True North Breeders' Cup Handicap; Alfred G. Vanderbilt Handicap; Breeder's Cup wins: Breeders' Cup Sprint (2004)

Awards
- Eclipse Award for Champion Sprinter (2004)
- Last updated on December 9, 2023

Speightstown (February 1, 1998 – December 8, 2023) was an American Thoroughbred racehorse who won the 2004 Breeders' Cup Sprint and was named that year's Champion sprinter. He also tied the track record for six furlongs at Saratoga race course. He became one of North America's leading sires.

== Background ==
Speightstown was a chestnut horse with a white star and a white sock on the left hind leg. He was bred by Aaron and Marie Jones. His sire was Gone West, an outstanding miler and one of Mr. Prospector's best sire sons. Speightstown was the first foal out of Silken Cat, who won the Sovereign Award for Canadian champion 2-year-old in 1995. Silken Cat was from a good female family that included stakes winners on both turf and dirt. Her line traces to Meadow Stable's great broodmare Hildene, dam of champions Hill Prince and First Landing. Silken Cat died in 2016, having produced ten foals, seven of which were sold at auction for a combined $8.7 million.

As a yearling, Speightstown was an outstanding physical specimen: compact and muscular with correct conformation. He sold at the 1999 Keeneland July Sale for $2 million to Eugene Melnyk. In July 2004, Taylor Made and WinStar Farm purchased an interest.

Speightstown was trained by Todd Pletcher.

== Racing career ==
Nagging injuries kept Speightstown from showing his full ability until he was six. He made only one start as a two-year-old, a six-furlong maiden race at Saratoga on August 26, 2000. He finished last, beaten by 15 lengths, having raced greenly and tired.

On February 3, 2001, at Gulfstream Park, Speightstown, now age 3, broke his maiden by 6 3/4 lengths. Next time out on February 24, he settled into third place down the backstretch and was unable to improve his position in the stretch. On March 18, Speightstown tried stakes company for the first time in the 1 mile Gotham Stakes at Aqueduct. He showed early speed but faded badly, beaten by 24 3/4 lengths.

Speightstown was shipped to Woodbine racetrack in Toronto, Ontario for his next start on April 8, cutting back in distance to 7 furlongs. This time he stalked the pace from the outside and took charge entering the stretch, drawing off to win by 8 lengths. He followed this with two more wins in allowance races at Woodbine in June. He then shipped to Saratoga for the Grade II Amsterdam Stakes on August 21, 2001, against heavily favored City Zip. The two dueled for the lead around the track and exchanged bumps on the turn. Speightstown was game but City Zip prevailed by a length.

Speightstown injured a knee in the Amsterdam and was unable to race for nearly two years. He returned to the track on May 9, 2003, in an allowance race at Belmont Park. He contested the pace with Harmony Hall, who eventually faded, but then Volponi, the previous year's Breeders' Cup Classic winner, closed rapidly and pulled ahead in mid-stretch. Speightstown fought back and eventually won by a neck. In his next start on May 26 in the Jaipur Handicap, Speightstown was made the high weight, conceding 5 pounds to the favorite, Garnered. The event was moved off the turf and held on a sloppy track. The two dueled around the track before Garnered finally pulled away, winning by 1 1/2 lengths.

=== 2004: Six-year-old campaign ===
Speightstown missed the next 10 months, finally returning at age 6 in the Artax Handicap at Gulfstream Park on March 27, 2004. In what would be his first stakes win, Speightstown withstood an early duel for the lead and drew away in the stretch to win by 4 1/2 lengths. He followed up in the Churchill Downs Handicap on May 1, where he went wire-to-wire against favoured Congaree to win by 3 1/2.

His next start was in the True North Handicap at Belmont on June 5. Speightstown let Cat Genius take the lead, but went by on the backstretch after an opening quarter mile in :21.58. He covered the half in :43.72, five furlongs in a very fast :55.35, and finished the six furlongs in 1:08.04. "The other horses tried to reach him and all I had to do was keep him running", his jockey John Velazquez said. "The only other thing I had to do was steer him clear of traffic and let him run his race. He was awesome."

His next start was the $200,000 Alfred G. Vanderbilt Handicap on August 13 at Saratoga, where he carried the top weight of 120 pounds. He dueled with Mike's Classic through swift fractions of :22 for the first quarter and :44 2/5 for the half. Speightstown finally took command in the final furlong and won by 1 1/2 lengths in a time of 1:08.04 for the six furlongs. This tied the track mark set by Spanish Riddle in 1972 while breaking the stakes record of 1:08 1/5 established by Five Star Day in 2000. These records still stand as of 2016. He earned a Beyer Speed Figure of 117 for the race, the highest number earned by a sprinter in 2004.

On October 2, Speightstown returned to Belmont Park as the favorite for the Vosburgh Stakes. He stumbled at the start, then went to the lead but could not sustain his normal pace and faded to third behind Pico Central. "The track was cupping away from him", Pletcher said later. "He is normally an exceptionally quick gate horse and a good gate horse. He just couldn't get his feet underneath him." Pico Central was now considered to be the leader in the sprint division, taking into account two earlier Grade 1 wins. But he had not been nominated as a foal to the Breeders' Cup so his connections opted to bypass the Sprint for the Cigar Mile, in which he would finish third.

With the title of champion sprinter at stake, Speightstown traveled to Texas where the Breeders' Cup was being held at Lone Star Park. Even with Pico Central's absence, the field of 13 for the Breeders' Cup Sprint was top notch, including the defending winner, Cajun Beat, Kela, who had beaten Pico Central earlier in the year, and Midas Eyes, the narrow favorite off a win in the Forego Stakes. Speightstown broke poorly but then established good position on the rail. Abbondanza took the early lead and ran a very fast opening quarter of :21.23, while the opening half went in :43.47. As the field entered the stretch, Speightstown took advantage of a small hole and went to the front, along with Gold Storm on the outside. The two briefly dueled before Speightstown pulled away, finishing the six furlongs in 1:08.11. The late-running Kela closed from the far outside to finish second. "He didn't break as well as I wanted to, but I took a little bit of a hold to get a good position", said Velazquez. "I had to take advantage of the inside. I had to take advantage when the hole was there."

In the voting for the Eclipse Award for Champion Sprinter, Speightstown beat Pico Central by 157 votes to 101. Speightstown's win in the Breeders' Cup Sprint on racing's biggest day was likely decisive. Said Pletcher, "I have the utmost respect for Pico Central. But both horses had blemishes on their records. The thing is, I never felt like the Vosburgh was a fair indication of what our horse was all about. He stumbled coming out of there, and the track was not what we expected it to be. It was deep, cuppy, tiring. And, taking nothing away from Voodoo, but when Voodoo [a rank outsider] beat us, we felt our horse just didn't run his race. We threw that race out, regrouped, went on to the Breeders' Cup at a neutral and fair track, and won what we consider to be the biggest sprint race of the year."

=== Racing statistics ===
| Date | Age | Distance | Race | Grade | Track | Odds | Field | Finish | Winning time | Winning (Losing) margin | Ref |
|---|---|---|---|---|---|---|---|---|---|---|---|
| Aug 26, 2000 | 2 | 6 furlongs | Maiden Special Weight | | Saratoga | 2.60 | 13 | 13 | 1:11.46 | (15) lengths | |
| Feb 3, 2001 | 3 | 6 furlongs | Maiden Special Weight | | Gulfstream | 13.50 | 10 | 1 | 1:10.11 | 6 3/4 lengths | |
| Feb 24, 2001 | 3 | 6 furlongs | Allowance | | Gulfstream | 0.70 | 8 | 3 | 1:10.62 | (5) lengths | |
| Mar 18, 2001 | 3 | 1 mile | Gotham Stakes | III | Aqueduct | 15.10 | 8 | 7 | 1:35.14 | (24 3/4) lengths | |
| Apr 8, 2001 | 3 | 7 furlongs | Allowance | | Woodbine | 0.70 | 8 | 1 | 1:23.61 | 5 lengths | |
| Jun 3, 2001 | 3 | 6 furlongs | Allowance Optional Claiming | | Woodbine | 0.55 | 7 | 1 | 1:09.95 | 2 1/2 lengths | |
| Jun 24, 2001 | 3 | 7 furlongs | Allowance | | Woodbine | 1.25 | 7 | 1 | 1:22.08 | 2 lengths | |
| Aug 3, 2001 | 3 | 6 furlongs | Amsterdam Stakes | II | Saratoga | 5.40 | 6 | 2 | 1:11.03 | (1) length | |
| May 9, 2003 | 5 | 7 furlongs | Allowance | | Belmont | 4.70 | 6 | 1 | 1:22.89 | neck | |
| May 26, 2003 | 5 | 7 furlongs | Jaipur Handicap | Listed | Belmont | 2.05 | 5 | 2 | 1:23.49 | (1 1/4) lengths | |
| Mar 27, 2004 | 6 | 7 furlongs | Artax Handicap | Listed | Gulfstream | 3.20 | 9 | 1 | 1:22.89 | 4 1/2 lengths | |
| May 1, 2004 | 6 | 7 furlongs | Churchill Downs Handicap | II | Churchill Downs | 5.40 | 7 | 1 | 1:21.38 | 3 1/2 lengths | |
| Jun 5, 2004 | 6 | 6 furlongs | True North Breeders' Cup Handicap | II | Belmont | 1.80 | 9 | 1 | 1:08.04 | 1 1/2 lengths | |
| Aug 14, 2004 | 6 | 6 furlongs | Alfred G. Vanderbilt Handicap | II | Saratoga | 0.90 | 6 | 1 | 1:08.04 | 1 1/2 lengths | |
| Oct 2, 2004 | 6 | 6 furlongs | Vosburgh Stakes | I | Belmont | 0.80 | 5 | 3 | 1:09.74 | (4 1/2) lengths | |
| Oct 30, 2004 | 6 | 6 furlongs | Breeders' Cup Sprint | I | Lone Star Park | 3.70 | 13 | 1 | 1:08.11 | 1 1/4 lengths | |

== Stud career ==
Speightstown was retired to stud at WinStar Farms in 2005 for an initial fee of $40,000. Speightstown ranked among the top five stallions in his siring crop every season.

Speightstown has proven more versatile as a sire than his race record would suggest. Speightstown was a sprinter who was unsuccessful in his only attempt beyond 7 furlongs and who never raced on the turf. He was also slow to develop, with his championship season occurring at age six. Many of his most accomplished runners have been sprinters like him, including Dubai Golden Shaheen winner Reynaldothewizard and Essence Hit Man, Canada's champion sprinter in 2011 and 2012. However Speightstown has also sired several good longer distance runners including Travers Stakes winner Golden Ticket and Jockey Club Gold Cup winner Haynesfield. He has also sired some good turf runners, including Lord Shanakill and Seek Again.

Darren Fox, stallion season director for WinStar, said Speightstown has been a success due to his compatibility with a wide range of mares, as well as being a good option for those looking to find an outcross for Northern Dancer-line mares.

He had his best year to date in 2013, when he was the leading sire by number of stakes wins, second by both progeny earnings and stakes winners, and third by number of individual winners. WinStar raised Speightstown's stud fee from $60,000 to $80,000 for 2014 as a result. For 2016, his fee was further increased to $100,000.

From 16 crops of racing age, Speightstown has sired 26 Grade 1 winners on every surface, from six furlongs to 1 1/4 miles worldwide. He is represented by 229 black-type horses, 138 black-type winners, 65 graded stakes winners, and he has more than $155 million in progeny earnings. Speightstown was one of only three active sires to win a Breeders' Cup World Championships race and sire multiple Breeders' Cup winners—colt and filly, dirt and turf. His Breeders' Cup winners are Tamarkuz, winner of the 2016 G1 Breeders' Cup Dirt Mile and Sharing, winner of the 2019 G1 Breeders' Cup Juvenile Fillies Turf.

=== Notable progeny ===
Notable offspring include:

c = colt, f = filly, g = gelding

| Foaled | Name | Sex | Major Wins Lord Shanakill |
| 2006 | Haynesfield | c | Jockey Club Gold Cup |
| 2006 | Jersey Town | c | Cigar Mile |
| 2006 | Lord Shanakill | c | Prix Jean Prat |
| 2006 | Mona de Momma | f | Humana Distaff Handicap |
| 2006 | Reynaldothewizard | c | Dubai Golden Shaheen |
| 2008 | Poseidon's Warrior | c | Alfred G. Vanderbilt Handicap |
| 2009 | Dance to Bristol | f | Ballerina Handicap |
| 2009 | Golden Ticket | c | Travers Stakes (Dead heat) |
| 2009 | She's Happy (ARG) | c | Gran Premio Estrellas Sprint (ARG) (2013) |
| 2010 | Lighthouse Bay | f | Prioress Stakes |
| 2010 | Seek Again | c | Hollywood Derby |
| 2010 | Tamarkuz | c | Breeders' Cup Dirt Mile |
| 2011 | Rock Fall | c | Alfred G. Vanderbilt Handicap |
| 2012 | Force the Pass | c | Belmont Derby Invitational |
| 2014 | Flagstaff | c | Churchill Downs Stakes |
| 2014 | Switzerland | c | Dubai Golden Shaheen (UAE) |
| 2015 | Competitionofideas | f | American Oaks |
| 2015 | Mozu Superflare | f | Takamatsunomiya Kinen (JPN) |
| 2016 | Lexitonian | c | Alfred G. Vanderbilt Handicap |
| 2017 | Charlatan | c | Arkansas Derby (Division 1), Malibu Stakes |
| 2017 | Echo Town | c | H. Allen Jerkens Memorial Stakes |
| 2017 | Sharing | f | Breeders' Cup Juvenile Fillies Turf |
| 2017 | Shirl's Speight | f | Maker's Mark Mile Stakes |
| 2018 | Lady Shakespeare | f | Natalma Stakes |
| 2018 | Olympiad | c | Jockey Club Gold Cup |
| 2021 | Prince of Monaco | c | Del Mar Futurity |
| 2022 | Salamis | c | Hollywood Derby |

Others include:

- Munnings (2006) – three time Grade II winner, sire of multiple G1 winners
- Essence Hit Man (2007) – 2011 and 2012 Champion Male Sprinter in Canada, set track record for 6 furlongs at Woodbine on Polytrack
- Bridgetown (2007) – Summer Stakes, set a new course record for 5½ furlongs at Monmouth Park
- Delegation (2009) – stakes winner, set track record for 1 1/4 miles on Woodbine's Polytrack

=== Stallion statistics ===
By Racing Year
| Year | North American rank | Winners | Stakes winners | Graded Stakes winners | Chief earner | Earnings^{†} |
|---|---|---|---|---|---|---|
| 2008 | #5 first-crop | 41 | 5 | 1 | Lord Shanakill | $1,246,219 |
| 2009 | #4 second-crop | 65 | 9 | 6 | Munnings | $5,137,115 |
| 2010 | 10 | 105 | 14 | 5 | Haynesfield | $6,791,937 |
| 2011 | 7 | 141 | 14 | 2 | Essence Hit Man | $7,195,605 |
| 2012 | 3 | 148 | 20 | 8 | Golden Ticket | $9,989,690 |
| 2013 | 2 | 154 | 20 | 10 | Reynaldothewizard | $11,257,879 |
| 2014 | 9 | 134 | 16 | 4 | Seek Again | $8,511,611 |
| 2015 | 8 | 122 | 13 | 7 | Force the Pass | $9,883,644 |
| 2016 | 18 | 95 | 9 | 1 | Tamarkuz | $6,818,471 |
| 2017 | 20 | 117 | 3 | 1 | Frostmourne | $6,665,906 |
| 2018 | 20 | 95 | 6 | 1 | Switzerland | $6,482,356 |
| 2019 | 14 | 91 | 12 | 6 | Sharing | $8,858,904 |
| 2020 | 7 | 95 | 26 | 8 | Charlatan | $7,477,008 |
| 2021 | 14 | 106 | 28 | 7 | Flagstaff | $8,276,908 |
| 2022 | 8 | 96 | 19 | 4 | Olympiad | $8,276,908 |

^{†} Prior to 2015, the Leading Sire Lists published by The Blood-Horse excluded earnings from Hong Kong and Japan due to the disparity in purses. Starting in 2015, earnings from Hong Kong and Japan are included on an adjusted basis.

== Illness and death ==
Speightstown had suffered at least three bouts of colic: in December 2004, April 2010 and November 2012. He had recovered well despite requiring minor surgery.

On December 8, 2023, Speightstown was humanely euthanized at the age of 25 due to foot issues from old age.

== Pedigree ==
Pedigree of Speighstown, chestnut horse, 1998
| Sire Gone West 1984 | Mr. Prospector; 1970 | Raise a Native | Native Dancer |
| Sire Gone West 1984 | Mr. Prospector; 1970 | Raise a Native | Raise You |
| Sire Gone West 1984 | Mr. Prospector; 1970 | Gold Digger | Nashua |
| Sire Gone West 1984 | Mr. Prospector; 1970 | Gold Digger | Sequence |
| Sire Gone West 1984 | Secrettame; 1978 | Secretariat | Bold Ruler |
| Sire Gone West 1984 | Secrettame; 1978 | Secretariat | Somethingroyal |
| Sire Gone West 1984 | Secrettame; 1978 | Tamarett | Tim Tam |
| Sire Gone West 1984 | Secrettame; 1978 | Tamarett | Mixed Marriage |
| Dam Silken Cat (CAN) 1993 | Storm Cat; 1983 | Storm Bird | Northern Dancer |
| Dam Silken Cat (CAN) 1993 | Storm Cat; 1983 | Storm Bird | South Ocean |
| Dam Silken Cat (CAN) 1993 | Storm Cat; 1983 | Terlingua | Secretariat |
| Dam Silken Cat (CAN) 1993 | Storm Cat; 1983 | Terlingua | Crimson Saint |
| Dam Silken Cat (CAN) 1993 | Silken Doll; 1980 | Chieftain | Bold Ruler |
| Dam Silken Cat (CAN) 1993 | Silken Doll; 1980 | Chieftain | Pocahontas |
| Dam Silken Cat (CAN) 1993 | Silken Doll; 1980 | Insilca | Buckpasser |
| Dam Silken Cat (CAN) 1993 | Silken Doll; 1980 | Insilca | Copper Canyon family: 9-b |

Speightstown is inbred 3 × 4 to Secretariat, meaning Secretariat appears once in the third generation and once in the fourth generation of his pedigree. Speightstown is also inbred 4 × 4 × 5 to Bold Ruler, and 5 × 5 to Tom Fool.
