= Miguel Mena (jockey) =

Peruvian-born American jockey (1986–2021)

Jose Miguel Mena Rodriguez
- Mena in 2021

Personal information
- Born: November 6, 1986 Lima, Peru
- Died: October 31, 2021 (aged 34) Louisville, Kentucky, U.S.
- Occupation: Jockey

Horse racing career
- Sport: Horse racing
- Career wins: 2,071

Major racing wins
- Fayette Stakes (2007); Matt Winn Stakes (2007); Iowa Derby (2008); Sugar Bowl Stakes (2008); Bashford Manor Stakes (2009); Derby Trial Stakes (2009); Sanford Stakes (2009); Mineshaft Handicap (2010); Silverbulletday Stakes (2010); Sorority Stakes (2010); Test Stakes (2010); Tiffany Lass Stakes (2010); Cornhusker Handicap (2011); Stephen Foster Handicap (2011, 2020); Golden Rod Stakes (2012); Kentucky Jockey Club Stakes (2012); River City Handicap (2012); Hawthorne Gold Cup Handicap (2012); Iroquois Stakes (2012); Colonel E.R. Bradley Handicap (2012); Hal's Hope Stakes (2013); Chicago Handicap (2013); Louisiana Derby (2015); West Virginia Governor's Stakes (2016)

Racing awards
- Leading rider at Ellis Park (2006); Leading rider at Presque Isle Downs (2007)

Significant horses
- Backtalk, Champagne d'Oro, Pool Play, Uncaptured

Jose Miguel Mena Rodriguez (November 6, 1986 – October 31, 2021) was a Peruvian-born American jockey in Thoroughbred horse racing who had been competing in the United States from 2003 until his death. He won his 2,000th race in 2020. He was from a Peruvian family involved in horse racing. His father Jose is a retired jockey.

Mena's first horse racing related memory was of Grozny winning the Derby Nacional.

Mena won two Grade 1 races in his career, and in 2015 he swept the major three-year-old stakes races at the Fair Grounds aboard International Star.

Mena was killed on October 31, 2021, when he was struck by the driver of a vehicle as a pedestrian on Interstate 64 in Louisville, Kentucky.

== Year-end charts ==
Chart (2007–present)	Peak position
National Earnings List for Jockeys 2007	37
National Earnings List for Jockeys 2008	33
National Earnings List for Jockeys 2009	44
National Earnings List for Jockeys 2010	48
National Earnings List for Jockeys 2011	55
National Earnings List for Jockeys 2012	33
National Earnings List for Jockeys 2013	34
National Earnings List for Jockeys 2014	49
National Earnings List for Jockeys 2015	57
