= Mineshaft Stakes =

- Class: Grade III
- Location: Fair Grounds Race Course; New Orleans, Louisiana, United States
- Inaugurated: 1973 (as Whirlaway Handicap)
- Race type: Thoroughbred – Flat racing
- Website: Fair Grounds

Race information
- Distance: 1 1/16 miles
- Surface: Dirt
- Track: left-handed
- Qualification: Four-years-old and older
- Weight: 124 lbs with allowances
- Purse: $250,000 (2022)

The Mineshaft Stakes is a Grade III American Thoroughbred horse race for four-year-olds and older run over a distance of 1 1/16 miles on the dirt in mid-February at the Fair Grounds Race Course in New Orleans, Louisiana. The event currently offers a purse of $250,000.

== History ==
The event was inaugurated on 18 February 1973 as the Whirlaway Handicap, a handicap event for three-year-olds and older over a distance of one mile and forty years and was won by the five-year-old Guitar Player who was ridden by Leroy Moyers in a time of 1:41 2/5. The event was named in honor of Whirlaway, the fifth Triple Crown of Horse Racing winner in 1941.

The event became a preparatory race for the Louisiana Handicap and New Orleans Handicap which were held later in the Fair Ground meeting. The first four winners of the event went on and won the Louisiana Handicap. Most notable of these winners was the 1975 Preakness Stakes winner Master Derby who won the event as a short 2/5 odds-on favorite scoring by eight lengths. Master Derby went on to sweep the Louisiana Handicap and New Orleans Handicap.

The event was run in two divisions in 1975 and the winners were both trained and owned in part by Louie J. Roussel III. In 1985 the distance of the event was increased to 1 1/16 miles.

The event was not held between 1986 and 1991.

The event was upgraded to Grade III status in 2003.

In 2005 the event was renamed for Hall of Fame inductee Mineshaft, who finished second in the 2003 running to Balto Star. Although Mineshaft was defeated in this event his record of wins that year including the New Orleans Handicap earned him the title American Horse of the Year and U.S. Champion Older Male Horse. His son Nates Mineshaft won this event in 2012.

The event continues to be a major prep for the New Orleans Handicap.

In 2020 the conditions of the event were changed from a handicap, to a stakes race with allowance weight conditions.

== Records ==
Speed record:

- 1 1/16 miles: 1:42.01 – Olympiad (2022) (New Track Record)

Margins:

- 8 lengths – Master Derby (1976)

Most wins:

- 2 - Silver Dust (2019, 2020)

Most wins by a jockey:

- 3 - Eddie Martin Jr. (1994, 1999, 2003)
- 3 - Robby Albarado (2000, 2002, 2008)
- 3 - Rosie Napravnik (2011, 2013, 2014)

Most wins by a trainer:

- 3 - Louie J. Roussel III (1975 - 2 divisions, 1994)

Most wins by an owner:

- 2 - Louie J. Roussel III (1975, 1994)
- 2 - John A. Franks (1997, 1999)
- 2 - Anstu Stables (2003, 2015)
- 2 - Tom R. Durant (2019, 2020)

Whirlaway/Mineshaft – Louisiana Stakes double:

- Guitar Player (1973), Tom Tulle (1974), Hearts of Lettuce (1975), Master Derby (1976), Bucks Nephew (1996)

Whirlaway/Mineshaft – New Orleans Handicap double:

- Master Derby (1976), Precocity (1999), Include (2001), Master Command (2007), Nates Mineshaft (2012), Honorable Duty (2017), Olympiad (2022)

== Winners ==
Year	Winner	Age	Jockey	Trainer	Owner	Distance	Time	Purse	Grade	Ref
Mineshaft Stakes
2026	Hit Show	6	Florent Geroux	Brad H. Cox	Wathnan Racing	1 1/16 miles	1:42.49	$242,500	III	
2025	Hall of Fame	4	Jose L. Ortiz	Steven M. Asmussen	Derrick Smith, Mrs. John Magnier, Michael Tabor, Westerburg, Gandharvi & Brook T Smith	1 1/16 miles	1:42.89	$247,500	III	
2024	Money Supply	5	Tyler Gaffalione	Joe Sharp	Jordan V. Wycoff	1 1/16 miles	1:44.04	$247,500	III	
2023	Pioneer of Medina	4	Luis Saez	Todd A. Pletcher	Sumaya U.S. Stable	1 1/16 miles	1:43.59	$250,000	III	
2022	Olympiad	4	Junior Alvarado	William I. Mott	Grandview Equine, Cheyenne Stable & LNJ Foxwoods	1 1/16 miles	1:42.01	$247,500	III	
2021	Maxfield	4	Florent Geroux	Brendan Walsh	Godolphin Racing	1 1/16 miles	1:43.67	$200,000	III	
2020	Silver Dust	6	Brian Hernandez Jr.	W. Bret Calhoun	Tom R. Durant	1 1/16 miles	1:43.40	$200,000	III	
Mineshaft Handicap
2019	Silver Dust	5	Jack Gilligan	W. Bret Calhoun	Tom R. Durant	1 1/16 miles	1:45.46	$150,000	III	
2018	The Player	5	Calvin H. Borel	William B. Bradley	William B. Bradley & Carl Hurst	1 1/16 miles	1:42.29	$147,000	III	
2017	Honorable Duty	5	Julien R. Leparoux	Brendan P. Walsh	DARRS	1 1/16 miles	1:43.03	$122,500	III	
2016	Majestic Harbor	8	Corey J. Lanerie	Paul J. McGee	Gallant Stable	1 1/16 miles	1:42.86	$125,000	III	
2015	Street Babe	4	Kerwin D. Clark	Michael Dilger	Anstu Stables	1 1/16 miles	1:43.58	$125,000	III	
2014	Bradester	4	Rosie Napravnik	Eddie Kenneally	Joseph W. Sutton	1 1/16 miles	1:43.80	$150,000	III	
2013	Mark Valeski	4	Rosie Napravnik	J. Larry Jones	Brereton C. Jones	1 1/16 miles	1:44.82	$148,500	III	
2012	Nates Mineshaft	5	Jesse M. Campbell	Austin K. Smith	Windy Hill Farm	1 1/16 miles	1:43.01	$120,000	III	
2011	Demarcation	7	Rosie Napravnik	Paul J. McGee	Amerman Racing	1 1/16 miles	1:43.45	$121,250	III	
2010	Stonehouse	6	Miguel Mena	Joseph E. Broussard	Richard Rudolph & Michael Vranich	1 1/16 miles	1:44.09	$96,000	III	
2009	Honest Man	5	Gabriel Saez	J. Larry Jones	Fox Hill Farms	1 1/16 miles	1:44.16	$125,000	III	
2008	Grasshopper	4	Robby Albarado	Neil J. Howard	William S. Farish III, Edward J. Hudson, Jr. & Estate of James A. Elkins	1 1/16 miles	1:43.46	$147,000	III	
2007	Master Command	5	John R. Velazquez	Michael W. McCarthy	Aaron U. & Marie D. Jones	1 1/16 miles	1:42.28	$194,000	III	
2006	‡Race not held									
2005	Wanderin Boy	4	Larry Melancon	Nicholas P. Zito	Arthur B. Hancock III	1 1/16 miles	1:43.08	$100,000	III	
Whirlaway Handicap
2004	Olmodavor	5	Corey J. Lanerie	Richard E. Mandella	Wertheimer et Frere	1 1/16 miles	1:45.59	$100,000	III	
2003	Balto Star	5	Eddie Martin Jr.	Todd A. Pletcher	Anstu Stables	1 1/16 miles	1:43.74	$125,000	III	
2002	Valhol	6	Robby Albarado	Dallas E. Keen	James D. Jackson	1 1/16 miles	1:42.94	$125,000	Listed	
2001	Include	4	Lonnie Meche	Bud Delp	Robert Meyerhoff	1 1/16 miles	1:44.01	$125,000	Listed	
2000	Take Note of Me	6	Robby Albarado	Gene A. Cilio	Steve Holland & Estate of Barry Shipp	1 1/16 miles	1:42.94	$125,000	Listed	
1999	Precocity	5	Eddie Martin Jr.	Bobby C. Barnett	John A. Franks	1 1/16 miles	1:43.42	$125,000	Listed	
1998	Moonlight Dancer	6	Curt C. Bourque	Albert Stall Jr.	Columbine Stable	1 1/16 miles	1:44.34	$125,000	Listed	
1997	Byars	6	Curt C. Bourque	Bobby C. Barnett	John A. Franks	1 1/16 miles	1:44.47	$100,000	Listed	
1996	Bucks Nephew	6	Craig Perret	P. Noel Hickey	Irish Acres Farm	1 1/16 miles	1:43.40	$63,375	Listed	
1995	Adhocracy	5	Larry Melancon	Niall M. O'Callaghan	Centaur Farms	1 1/16 miles	1:43.10	$52,550	Listed	
1994	Cool Quaker	5	Eddie Martin Jr.	Louie J. Roussel III	Louie J. Roussel III	1 1/16 miles	1:42.55	$51,674	Listed	
1993	West by West	4	Jean-Luc Samyn	George R. Arnold II	John H. Peace	1 1/16 miles	1:43.80	$31,475		
1992	Irish Swap	5	Bruce Edwin Poyadou	Joseph E. Broussard	Randall Hendricks	1 1/16 miles	1:43.00	$31,625		
1986–1991		Race not held								
1985	Rapid Gray	6	Randy Romero	William I. Mott	William F. Lucas	1 1/16 miles	1:43.00	$25,000		
1982–1984		Race not held								
1981	Occasionally Monday	4	Angelo Trosclair	Jose A. Martin	Randolph Weinsier	1 mile & 40 yards	1:40.40	$25,000		
1980	Weather Tamer	4	Pat Day	Clifford Scott	Avers Wexler	1 mile & 40 yards	1:42.60	$25,000		
1979	Prince Majestic	4	Eddie Delahoussaye	Dewey P. Smith	Dorothy Dorset Brown	1 mile & 40 yards	1:40.20	$25,000		
1978	†Race not held									
1977	Cylinder	4	Ray Sibille	Larry Robideaux Jr.	Greenbrier Stable	1 mile & 40 yards	1:39.60	$25,000		
1976	Master Derby	4	Darrel McHargue	William E. Adams	Golden Chance Farm	1 mile & 40 yards	1:38.80	$25,000		
1975	Burglar Alarm	5	Phil Rubbicco	Louie J. Roussel III	Louie J. Roussel III & Wilson Abraham	1 mile & 40 yards	1:39.20	$17,500		Division 1
1975	Hearts of Lettuce	5	Allen LeBlanc	Louie J. Roussel III	Robert Azar	1 mile & 40 yards	1:38.80	$17,500		Division 2
1974	Tom Tulle	4	Craig Perret	Jere R. Smith	W. Arthur Lofton	1 mile & 40 yards	1:38.80	$20,000		
1973	Guitar Player	5	A. Leroy Moyers Jr.	Jack Van Berg	M. H. Van Berg Stable	1 mile & 40 yards	1:41.40	$20,000		

Notes:
† The 1978 renewal of the Whirlaway Handicap was cancelled after several trainers removed their horses from the entry list and there were insufficient runners to hold the event.
† The 2006 renewal of the Mineshaft Handicap was not scheduled due to the shortened Fair Grounds meeting being transferred to Louisiana Downs with continuing after effects of Hurricane Katrina which damaged the racetrack.

== See also ==
- List of American and Canadian Graded races
