= Rosie Napravnik =

American jockey (born 1988)

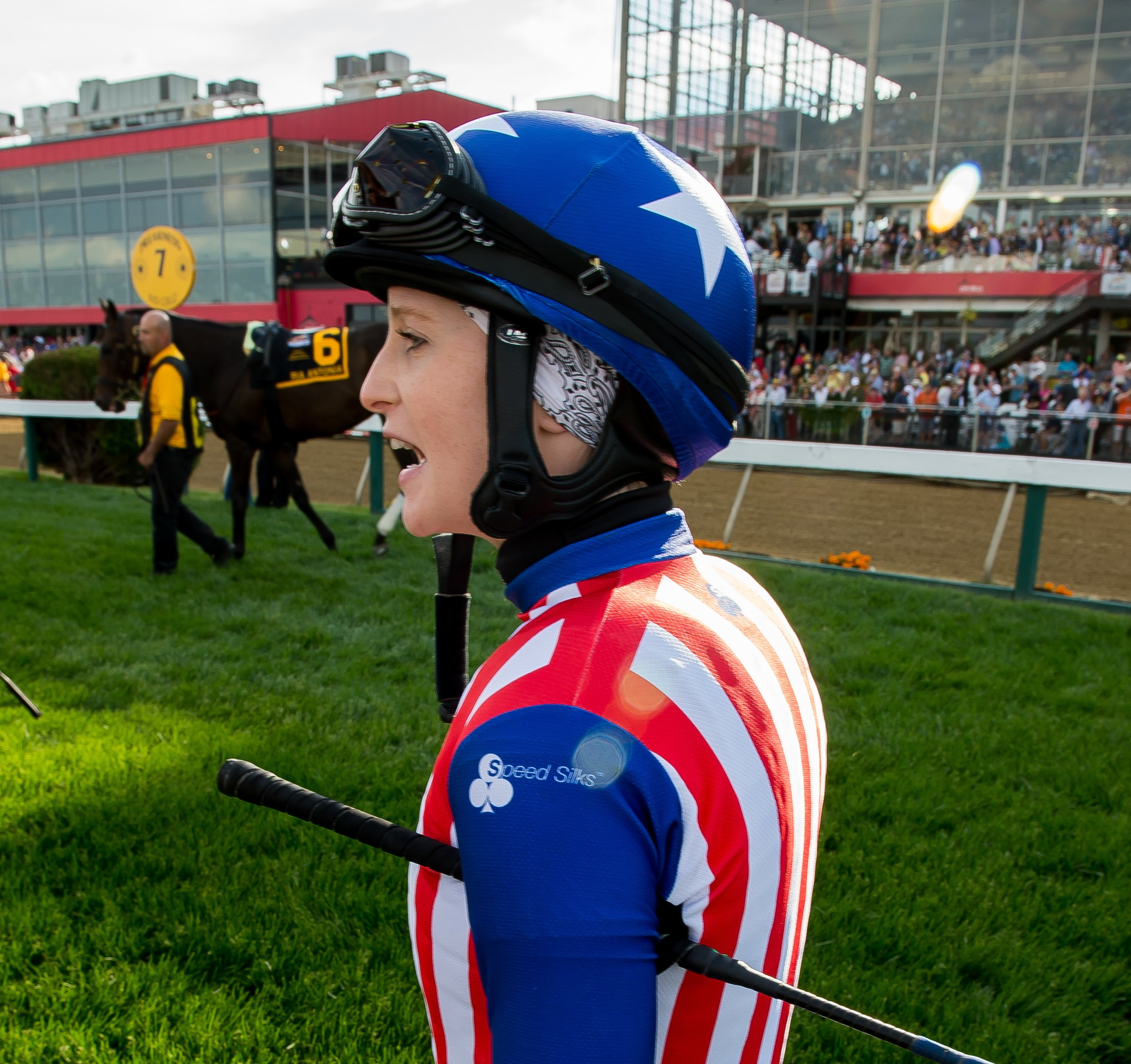
- Napravnik at the 2014 Preakness Stakes

Personal information
- Born: February 9, 1988 (age 38) Mendham, New Jersey, US
- Occupation: Jockey

Horse racing career
- Sport: Horse racing
- Career wins: 1,877

Major racing wins
- American Classics wins: Kentucky Oaks (2012, 2014); Acorn Stakes (2013) Breeders' Cup wins: Breeders' Cup Juvenile (2012); Breeders' Cup Distaff (2014) Graded Stakes wins: Grade I Wins; Jamaica Handicap (2012); Champagne Stakes (2012); Chandelier Stakes (2013); Secretariat Stakes (2013); Santa Margarita Handicap (2013); Acorn Stakes (2013); Humana Distaff Handicap (2014); Cotillion Handicap (2014) Grade II Wins; Hawthorne Gold Cup Handicap (2010); Louisiana Derby (2011, 2014); Fair Grounds Oaks (2012, 2014); Peter Pan Stakes (2012); Sanford Stakes (2012); Hopeful Stakes (2012); Matron Stakes (2012); Adirondack Stakes (2012); Alysheba Stakes (2013); Churchill Downs Stakes (2013); Rachel Alexandra Stakes (2013); Lake Placid Stakes (2013); Molly Pitcher Stakes (2013, 2014); Pocahontas Stakes (2012, 2013); Amsterdam Stakes (2014); West Virginia Derby (2014); Super Derby (2014) Grade III wins; Pin Oak Valley View Stakes (2010); Lone Star Park Handicap (2010); Cicada Stakes (2010); Pegasus Stakes (2011); Mineshaft Handicap (2011, 2013, 2014); Colonel E.R. Bradley Handicap (2011, 2014); Sanford Stakes (2012); John B. Connally Turf Cup Stakes (2012); Cardinal Handicap (2013); Matchmaker Stakes (2013); Louisville Handicap (2013); Doubledogdare Stakes (2013); Arlington Handicap (2013); Schuylerville Stakes (2013); Stars and Stripes Stakes (2013); Rachel Alexandra Stakes (2013, 2014); Lecomte Stakes (2014); Aristides Stakes (2014); Matt Winn Stakes (2013, 2014); Sycamore Stakes (2014) Listed stakes wins; Maryland Million Classic (2006); Private Terms Stakes (2006); Baltimore Breeders' Cup Turf Sprint (2006); Jim McKay Turf Sprint; Henry S. Clark Stakes (2008); Woodlawn Stakes (2008); Whimsical Stakes (2008); John B. Campbell Handicap (2010); Silverbulletday Stakes (2012); New Orleans Ladies Stakes (2013); Evan Shipman Handicap (2014)

Significant horses
- Shanghai Bobby; Mylute; Termsofengagement; Pants on Fire; Believe You Can
- Updated on 2014-1-1

Anna Rose "Rosie" Napravnik (born February 9, 1988) is a former American Thoroughbred horse racing jockey and two-time winner of the Kentucky Oaks. Beginning her career in 2005, she was regularly ranked among the top jockeys in North America in both earnings and total races won. By 2014 she had been in the top 10 by earnings three years in a row and was the highest-ranked woman jockey in North America. In 2011, she won the Louisiana Derby for her first time and was ninth in the 2011 Kentucky Derby with the horse Pants on Fire. In 2012 she broke the total wins and earnings record for a woman jockey previously held by Julie Krone, and became the first woman rider to win the Kentucky Oaks, riding Believe You Can. She won the Oaks for a second time in 2014 on Untapable. She is only the second woman jockey to win a Breeders' Cup race and the first to win more than one, having won the 2012 Breeders' Cup Juvenile on Shanghai Bobby and the 2014 Breeders' Cup Distaff on Untapable. Napravnik's fifth-place finish in the 2013 Kentucky Derby and third in the 2013 Preakness Stakes on Mylute are the best finishes for a woman jockey in those two Triple Crown races to date, and she is the only woman to have ridden in all three Triple Crown races.

A native of New Jersey, she and her horse trainer husband, Joe Sharp, have homes in Louisville, Kentucky and New Orleans, Louisiana. She was the leading rider at the Fair Grounds Race Course every year from 2011 through 2014 and leading rider at Keeneland Race Course in 2013 and 2014. After her win in the 2014 Breeders' Cup Distaff, Napravnik announced she was seven weeks pregnant and taking a "retirement" of "indefinite" duration from race riding following the 2014 Breeders' Cup. She continues to assist Sharp in training race horses, including 2017 Kentucky Derby contender Girvin.

== Background ==
Napravnik was born in her grandmother's home in Mendham, New Jersey, on February 9, 1988. Shortly after she was born, she was sent to a hospital in Morristown, New Jersey, which is often mistakenly listed as her location of birth. Her father Charles is a farrier and her mother Cindy ran a boarding and training stable, plus trained event horses. She has one older sister, Jasmine (known as "Jazz"), and a brother, Colt. Napravnik began working with horses at a very young age. Her first horse-related injury was a broken arm that occurred when she fell off a pony at age four. By the age of seven, she began to ride in pony races, and, inspired by the documentary Jewels of the Triple Crown, she decided that year to become a jockey who rode Triple Crown races. She spent most of her childhood in New Jersey, but lived briefly in Vermont with her mother after the divorce of her parents, though she spent summers with her sister Jazz, who was living in Maryland and Pennsylvania.

In early adolescence, Napravnik, along with her sister, went to work for trainers Lilith Boucher, Bruce Miller and Jack Fisher. By age 13, she worked for steeplechase trainer Jonathan Sheppard. At 15, she decided to take a year off from employment in the horse industry to spend time with friends and to be an ordinary teen. But at 16, Napravnik went to live with her sister at the farm of trainer Holly Robinson in Maryland, and Robinson sent her to work for trainer Richard "Dickie" Small. Small had a good reputation for mentoring young riders and had helped several other women jockeys get started in their careers. Napravnik began exercising Small's race horses in 2004. That year, she attended both Hereford High School and night school, but left school before her senior year to begin racing as a professional jockey. She later passed her high school equivalency GED test.

Napravnik is 5 ft 2 in (1.57 m) tall, and as a jockey rode at about 113 pounds (51 kg). In addition to racing, she is very active in efforts to rehome and provide aftercare to retired race horses. In 2014, she began to show her own off-track Thoroughbred Old Ironsides, nicknamed Sugar, in Eventing. Interviewed for Vogue magazine, she explained how she felt about riding in the American classic horse races, "When you're riding in the Derby, you see all those iconic silks in the same race and it gives it a special feel, like you're part of history."

=== Joe Sharp and family ===
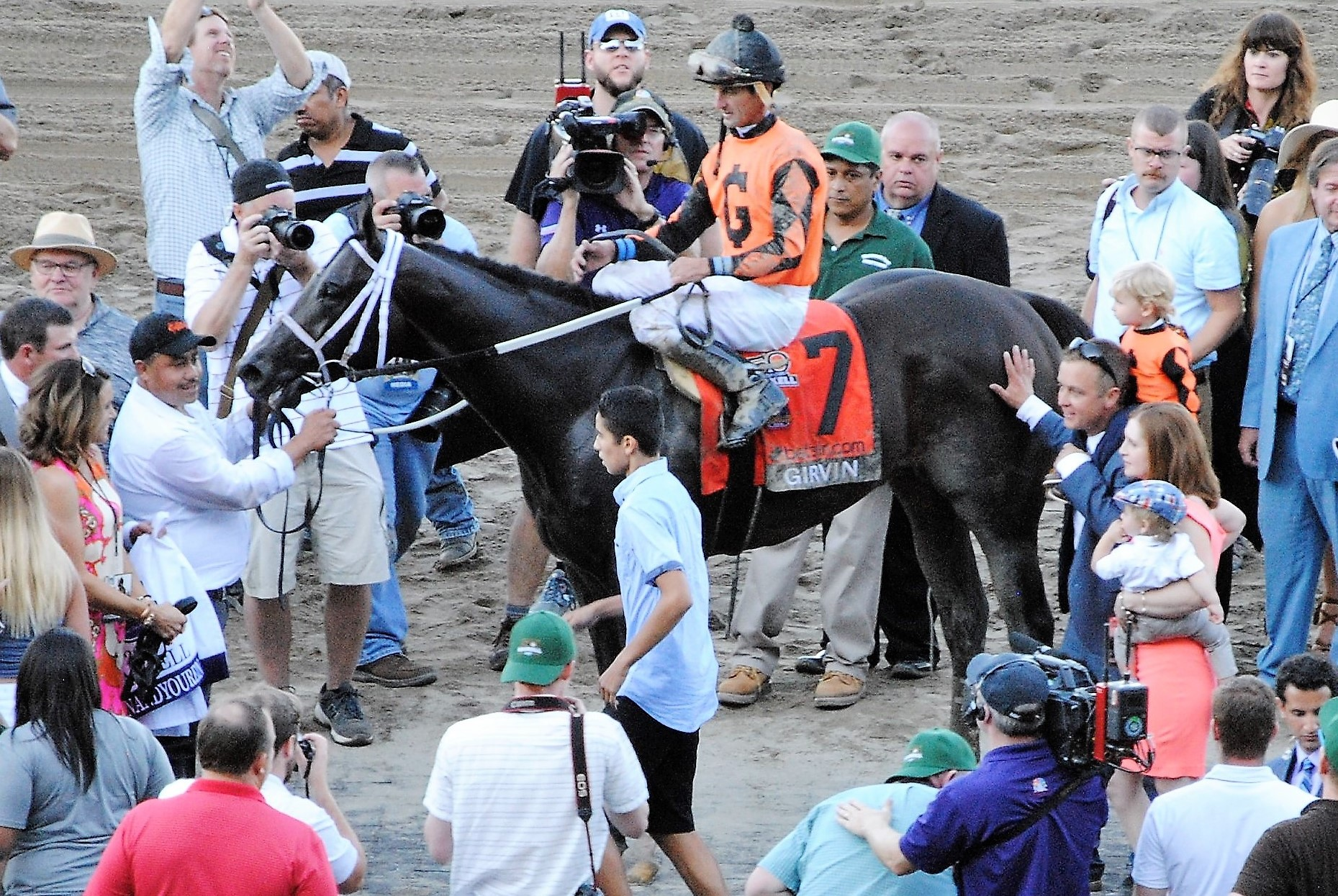
Joe Sharp, Napravnik, and their sons with Girvin at the Haskell Invitational winner's circle

Napravnik married Joe Sharp in October 2011. He is three years older than Napravnik, and has a daughter, born in 2005, whose mother is jockey Chamisa Goodwin. Napravnik and Sharp have two sons together,

Horse owner Ken Ramsey, who knows Napravnik and Sharp well, says the couple are likable and well-respected, saying "They go together like ham and eggs." Sharp had Napravnik ride a horse for him at Penn National Race Course in 2009, and they began dating a few months later, becoming engaged in 2011. Sharp, a horse trainer, was born in Martinsburg, West Virginia. He is an only child and grew up around horses. His father, Marc Sharp, is a trainer who also owns a horse farm near Harpers Ferry, West Virginia. His mother, Sara Escudero, was an exercise rider. The pair divorced and Sharp split his time between them, growing up in Kentucky and West Virginia.

Sharp was a jockey from 2004 to 2005, riding mostly at Canterbury Park in Minnesota, but also in West Virginia and Maryland. Sharp was an assistant trainer to Michael Stidham for four years, and then for three years an assistant to Mike Maker, where he ran Maker's operations in New York, Kentucky and New Orleans. Napravnik and Sharp sometimes competed against each other when a horse Sharp trained was running against one Napravnik was riding, but the two were a trainer-rider team for Ramsey's three-year-old colt, Vicar's In Trouble, who won the Louisiana Derby and contested the 2014 Kentucky Derby. In August 2014, Sharp left Maker's barn to begin an independent horse training stable, with the full support of both Maker and Napravnik. He scored his first graded stakes win on May 16, 2015 on the Preakness undercard with the Ramsey's horse Sandbar in the Grade III Maryland Sprint Handicap. In 2017, Sharp won the Louisiana Derby with Girvin, a colt who was Sharp's first starter in the 2017 Kentucky Derby. Napravnik was the exercise rider for the colt at Sharp's training stable, and commented, "I thought about putting out something on Twitter . . . saying I was going to ride Girvin, as an April Fool’s joke, but I was worried people might take it seriously."

Of the couple's relationship, Sharp has stated, "Some guys might think being married to someone as famous as Rosie is a tough position, but I don't, I'm very proud of her." Sharp and Napravnik split their time between homes in Louisville and New Orleans. Besides working with horses, the pair also provide foster care to rescue dogs.

== Career ==
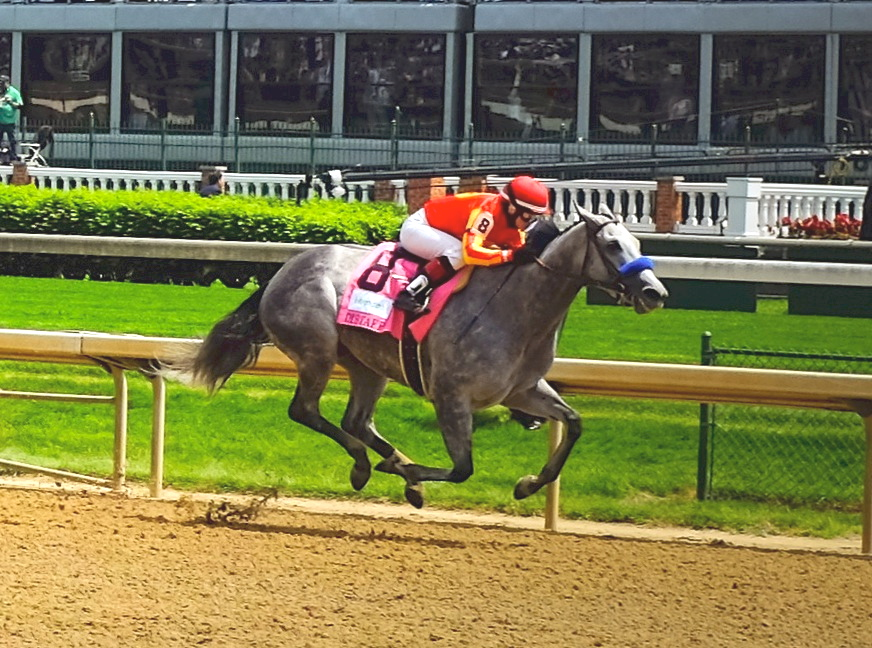
Napravnik riding Midnight Lucky to win the 2014 Humana Distaff at Churchill Downs

Napravnik obtained her jockey license in 2005 at Pimlico Race Course. She won her first race as a licensed jockey on June 9 of that year, riding Small's horse, Ringofdiamonds. She initially rode under the name "A.R. Napravnik" to conceal her gender. In November 2005, she broke her left collarbone and was sidelined for almost six weeks. The horse in front of her fell and her horse was unable to avoid a collision, creating a four-horse chain reaction that sent Napravnik and one of the other riders to the hospital. At the time of the accident, she was the leading jockey at Laurel Park Racecourse.

Napravnik established herself as a top-ranked jockey in 2006 when she finished 30th in national earnings and fifth in total wins with 300 victories on 1,465 mounts and purse winnings of $6,395,075. (Note: Jockeys earn approximately 10% of purse winnings in actual income.) That year at Laurel Park, she won her first stakes race. One of her highest profile wins was in a race that was on the undercard for the 2006 Preakness. She won riding titles in 2006 at all four meets at the major Maryland tracks, one at the annual meet at Pimlico, and the other three at Laurel Park. Napravnik was runner-up to Julien Leparoux for the Eclipse Award for Outstanding Apprentice Jockey that year.

When a horse fell with her in a January 2007 race at Laurel Park, Napravnik suffered three compression fractures of her thoracic vertebrae and was out for several weeks to recuperate. In July, after recovering from the Laurel Park injuries, she had another fall that resulted in a major break to her wrist, subsequently repaired with a plate. In spite of her injuries and layoff, she still rode 507 races with 89 winners in 2007. In 2008, Napravnik was the most successful rider in Maryland with 101 wins. Riding a total of 893 races with 176 wins, she finished 62nd in earnings for the year, even though she broke her tibia and fibula in a racing accident at Delaware Park Racetrack in August, resulting in a three-month layoff. She moved to Aqueduct Racetrack in New York in November 2008, and in 2009 finished 38th in national earnings with 184 victories out of 1,109 mounts and with earnings of $5,176,563.

"She gets a horse to relax and do what she wants it to do."

— Mike Smith, Hall of Fame jockey

In 2010, Napravnik began riding at Fair Grounds Race Course in New Orleans, Louisiana. Initially, she faced some of the most significant problems in her career with intimidation by the male jockeys, but overcame the challenge by refusing to give ground. Eventually she earned the respect of her male colleagues, and that year, she won her first graded stakes race, the Grade III Cicada Stakes at Aqueduct. By 2013 Napravnik was viewed as one of the most popular jockeys at the Fair Grounds. She finished the year with no major injuries and was ranked 30th in earnings.

Napravnik began 2011 with a win in the Louisiana Derby, riding Pants on Fire, becoming the first woman to win that race. When she was named the leading rider at that track in 2011, with 110 wins, she was also the first woman rider to win the title. She then became only the sixth woman to ride in the Kentucky Derby. riding Pants on Fire to a 9th place finish, the best placing for a woman rider in the history of the Derby to that date. She also was second in the 2011 Kentucky Oaks, riding a longshot filly named St. John's River. In July of that year, Napravnik fractured her arm again when the horse she was riding broke down on the track and fell. This time the fracture was just above the plate in her wrist that had repaired her first break, an injury that required a three-hour surgery and replacement of the wrist plate with a larger one.

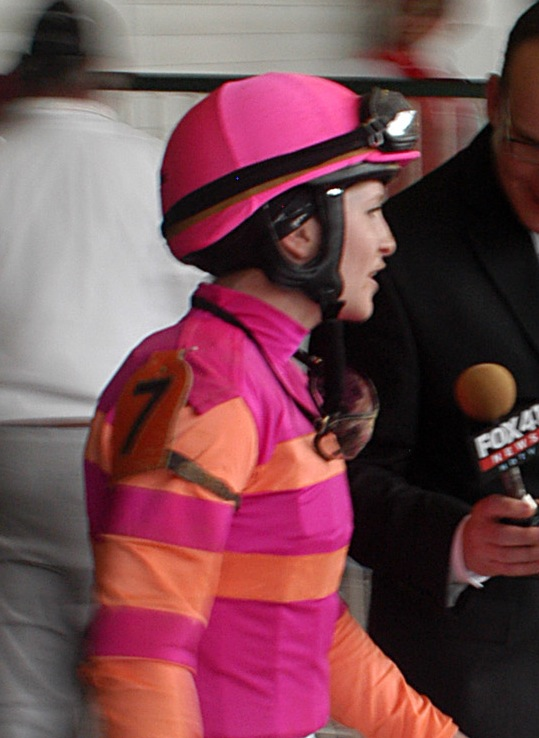
Napravnik at the 2011 Kentucky Derby

In 2012 Napravnik became the first woman jockey to win the Kentucky Oaks, riding Believe You Can. The race was also her first Grade I win. She then rode in the Belmont Stakes for the first time, finishing fifth aboard Five Sixteen. Later that year, she won the Breeders' Cup Juvenile aboard Shanghai Bobby, becoming only the second woman jockey to win a Breeder's Cup race. She received one minor injury in 2012: a non-displaced fracture of her toe, obtained when her horse hit the side of the starting gate at Saratoga. She finished the race and returned to ride the next day. She ended the year ranked 8th in national earnings, winning $12,451,713, which surpassed the earnings and national placing record for a female jockey previously held by Julie Krone. As a result, sports analysts viewed her as the most successful woman jockey since Krone.

Early in 2013, Napravnik once again won the leading rider title at the Fair Grounds, making it three years in a row that she had won the award. She had hopes of riding Shanghai Bobby, who was undefeated in five races, in the 2013 Kentucky Derby, but he suffered a pelvic fracture at the Florida Derby and missed the Triple Crown races. She was able to pick up another horse for the Derby, Mylute, with whom she broke her previous Kentucky Derby finish record, taking fifth. Napravnik rode in the Preakness Stakes for the first time in 2013, finishing third, again on Mylute. In doing so, she was only the third woman to ever ride in the Preakness, the first since 1994, and had the highest-placed finish for any woman jockey in that race. Adding the Preakness to her 2011 Kentucky Derby and 2012 Belmont races, she also became the first woman ever to have ridden in all three Triple Crown races. She then rode the filly Unlimited Budget to a 6th place finish in the 2013 Belmont, becoming the first woman to ride all three Triple Crown races in the same year. Napravnik also broke a record previously held by Donna Barton Brothers when she rode 45 winners at Churchill Downs' spring meet.

That summer, Napravnik also was named captain of the three member "Girls' Team" for the Shergar Cup jockey competition at Ascot Racecourse in the United Kingdom where she was the leading female rider of the team. In October, she became the first woman to win the leading rider title at Keeneland Race Course. She rode the two-year-old filly Untapable to a win in the Pocahontas Stakes, and then competed in the Breeders' Cup Juvenile Fillies, but finished eighth, having to check the filly to avoid another horse that fell during the race. She finished the year eighth in earnings at $13,242,202, breaking her own record from 2012, and was fifth in total wins.

She began 2014 being named the leading rider at the Fair Grounds Race Course for the fourth consecutive year. She won the 2014 Lecomte Stakes and the Louisiana Derby on the three-year-old colt Vicar's In Trouble, trained by Sharp while he was an assistant to Maker, and owned by Ken and Sarah Ramsey. Of Napravnik's ride in the Louisiana Derby, veteran hall of fame jockey Mike Smith, who rode the favorite but finished second, said, "She rode a great race. A brilliant race actually." Napravnik also teamed up again with Untapable, now a three-year-old, first winning the Rachel Alexandra Stakes and the Fair Grounds Oaks, and then to the jockey's second victory in the Kentucky Oaks, winning the 2014 race by 4-1/2 lengths. Prior to the Oaks, Napravnik told reporters, "I own this race." Napravnik's win on Untapable and a victory in the Humana Distaff Handicap, on the undercard on Derby day, brought her ranking up to second in the nation for jockey earnings and wins during the early weeks of May 2014. With mounts on Vicar's In Trouble in the Derby, Bayern in the 2014 Preakness Stakes, and General a Rod in the Belmont, for the second year in a row, she rode horses in all three Triple Crown races. She was in contention for leading jockey at Churchill Downs' spring meet, in second place with 31 winners, including a single day where she won five races, setting yet another record for a woman rider. But on June 15, the day after she had a major win on Tapiture, she had another significant injury: a separation of her clavicle and left shoulder joint that occurred when a horse she was working in the morning broke its leg and fell. While Napravnik did not require surgery, she was sidelined for a few weeks. Even though she missed the end of the Churchill meet, she still tied for second place in leading rider standings at that track. By July 5 she was working horses. She returned to racing on July 18 for the opening day of the Saratoga meet. In October, she repeated as leading rider at Keenland's fall meet.

After her win in the 2014 Breeders' Cup Distaff aboard Untapable, Napravnik announced that she was seven weeks pregnant and announced a "retirement" from race riding. When asked if her retirement was "permanent", she replied, "It's indefinite—I mean, I'm not thinking about a comeback in 10 months, but I can't promise to stay off a horse forever." She further explained that she intended to assist Sharp with his training business and intended to remain "very much involved with racing." At the time of her announcement, she ranked sixth in the nation for 2014 in earnings and fifth by number of wins. In spite of losing time due to injury and retiring with two months left in the year, Napravnik closed out 2014 seventh in the nation for earnings, bringing her lifetime total to $71,396,717.

Following her retirement announcement, Napravnik became Sharp's assistant trainer, continuing to ride regularly. After initially exercising the stable's race horses in the early months of her pregnancy, she moved over to ponying and other activities. As of 2015, she and Sharp hoped to have two children fairly close together, and after that, Napravnik has not ruled out a return to race riding but has not made any firm decisions. As she explained in February 2015, "I'm satisfied with the accomplishments that I've made. If I feel like I really want to come back in a few years then I can do it. The greatest thing is I don't have to."

== On being a woman jockey ==
"I don't like to start anything, ever, but if they're going to try to intimidate me, I like to just stand there and say, 'Sorry, it ain't gonna happen.' I'm shy but I'm badass. I'm not shy in a timid way, just shy in a way that I'm not comfortable with people."

— Rosie Napravnik

Napravnik's success has come in a sport where only 10% of all jockeys are women, even though they have been licensed as jockeys in pari-mutuel races since 1969. She initially was uncomfortable finding herself viewed as a role model for girls, preferring to simply be noticed as a top jockey. She became aware that she could have a positive impact on others and that helped her be more comfortable with her prominence. She still prefers to emphasize her riding prowess, she broke the total wins and earnings record for a woman jockey previously held by Julie Krone, and stated in 2014, "If you show your work ethic and professionalism and obvious skill and ability, that is what is going to win somebody over."

Like many other women jockeys, she views the primary challenge to be the difficulty of horse racing itself. She describes races as "every man for himself (sic)." She does not ask for any breaks from male jockeys, and has explained that horse racing is a sport where women simply have to be just as good as men. She speaks well of other successful women jockeys, and expresses a lot of respect in particular for Julie Krone, to whom she is often compared. But she also said in a 2011 interview, "a lot of young female riders are just girls who love horses, but they just don't have the strength and toughness, and they're not cut out to be jockeys. You've got to deliver the goods to get over that hump."

She acknowledges the struggles for equality that women riders in earlier generations had to face were greater than her own, but notes that women jockeys still "fight a battle." In her early career, she simply tried to "blend in" with the male riders, but nonetheless encountered some owners and trainers who refused to hire a female jockey. She later said, "I was very conscious when I raced against their horses—and when I beat them." Napravnik has encountered harassment from male jockeys on the track when other riders would deliberately bump her or pen in her horse from all sides. (Note: Video of the 2014 Preakness Stakes shows an example of Napravnik, on horse number 5, Bayern, being squeezed between two horses and pinned back by another during the first 30 seconds of the race. There have been no allegations that this particular incident was deliberate.) In a 2013 interview with 60 Minutes, Napravnik said that she has heard hecklers at the track yell at her to "go home and have a baby," or "go home and stay in the kitchen." She repeatedly has chosen to make her mark on the track instead of getting into post-race fights. Trainer Larry Jones, having witnessed other jockeys deliberately bumping into her on the track, commented, "Don't do Rosie that way, because she will run over you. The girl has no fear."

She summed up her views in a 2014 interview for Elle, stating, "We are beyond the days of being boycotted. We are beyond the days before Civil Rights. So it has to do with the woman. It has to do with the individual and being able to compete as smart, as sharp as any man."

== Year-end charts ==
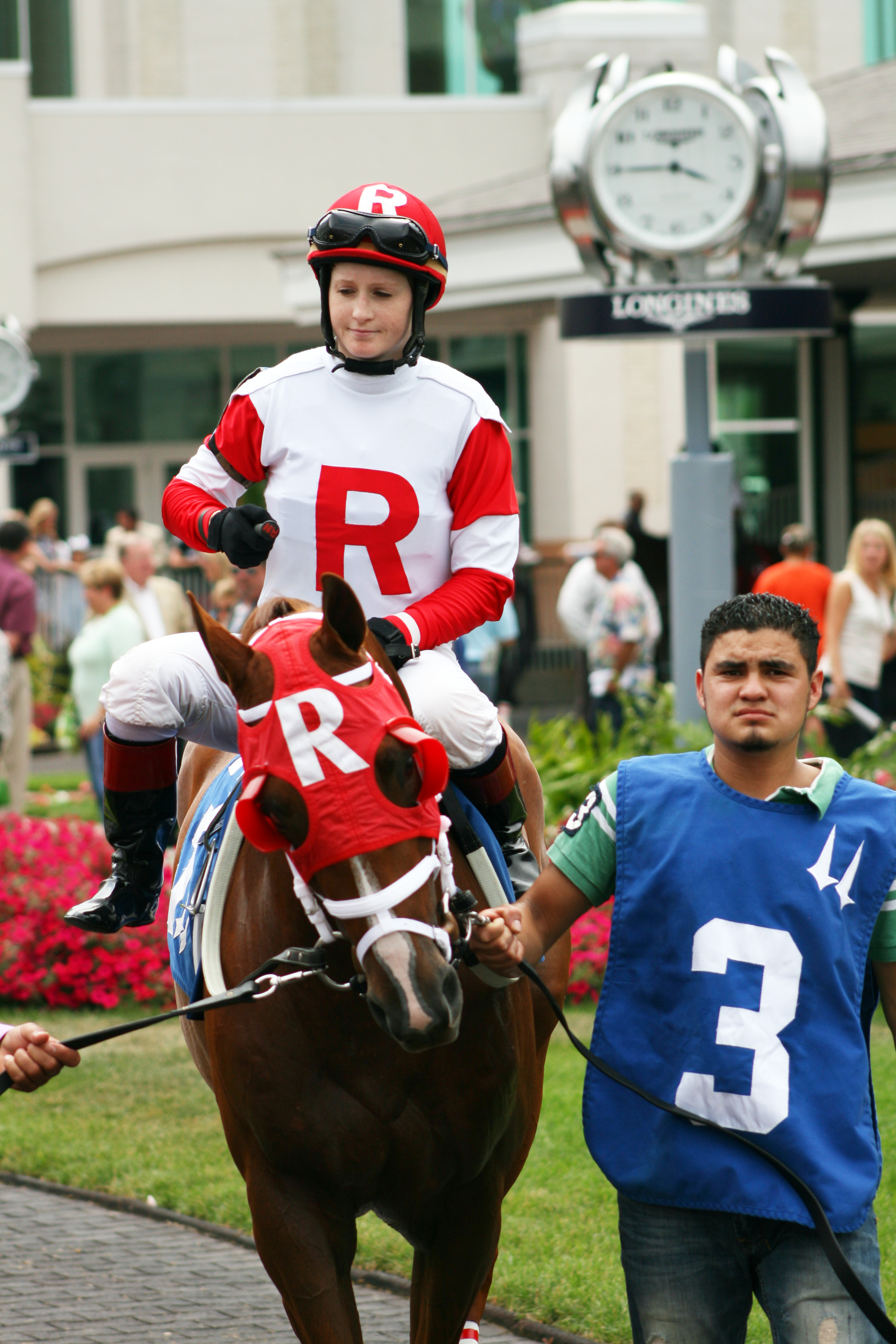
Napravnik at Churchill Downs in the silks of Ken and Sarah Ramsey's racing stable, 2013

Chart (2005–present)	Year end position
National Earnings List for Jockeys 2005	241 (Note: Apprentice year, licensed and rode first race in June, also was out due to injuries in November.)
National Earnings List for Jockeys 2006	30 (Note: 6th in total races won in 2006. Top-ranked woman rider in both earnings and races won)
National Earnings List for Jockeys 2007	166 (Note: Rode reduced schedule due to injuries.)
National Earnings List for Jockeys 2008	62 (Note: 46th by total races won in 2008, Emma-Jayne Wilson and Chantal Sutherland each had higher earnings, but neither won as many races)
National Earnings List for Jockeys 2009	38 (Note: 42nd by total races won in 2009, Emma-Jayne Wilson and Chantal Sutherland each had higher earnings, but neither won as many races)
National Earnings List for Jockeys 2010	30 (Note: 16th by total races won in 2010, Chantal Sutherland ranked above Napravnik in money earned, but won fewer races.)
National Earnings List for Jockeys 2011	24 (Note: 24th by total races won in 2011, Emma-Jayne Wilson ranked above Napravnik in both earnings and races won.)
National Earnings List for Jockeys 2012	8 (Note: 23rd by total races won in 2012. Top-ranked woman rider in both earnings and races won)
National Earnings List for Jockeys 2013	8 (Note: 5th by total races won in 2013. Top-ranked woman rider in both earnings and races won)
National Earnings List for Jockeys 2014	7 (Note: 22nd by total races won in 2014. Top-ranked woman rider in both earnings and races won)
