= Haynesfield =

American-bred Thoroughbred racehorse

- Sire: Speightstown
- Grandsire: Gone West
- Dam: Nothing Special
- Damsire: Tejabo
- Sex: Stallion
- Foaled: 2006
- Country: United States
- Colour: Chestnut
- Breeder: Barry Weisbord & Margaret Santulli
- Owner: Turtle Bird Stable
- Trainer: Steve Asmussen
- Record: 13: 9-1-1
- Earnings: US$1,116,981

Major wins
- Damon Runyon Stakes (2008); Count Fleet Stakes (2009); Whirlaway Stakes (2009); Empire Classic Stakes (2009); Discovery Handicap (2009); Suburban Handicap (2010); Jockey Club Gold Cup (2010)

Haynesfield (foaled May 12, 2006, in New York) is an American Thoroughbred racehorse. Bred by Barry Weisbord and Margaret Santulli, Haynesfield was purchased for $20,000 at the Keeneland April two-year-olds in training sale. He is sired by Speightstown, the American Champion Sprint Horse (2004), who had career earnings of $1,258,256 and capped off his career with a win in the Breeders' Cup Sprint. He is out of the dam Nothing Special, by Tejabo.

Haynesfield burst onto the racing spotlight when he won 4 straight races from October 2008 to February 2009.

Haynesfield has won numerous stakes races on the New York racing circuit.

Haynesfield won the Empire Classic at Belmont Park on 22 October 2011 for the second time, the first being in 2009.
