= Olympiad (horse) =

American racehorse

- Olympiad before the 2022 Stephen Foster Stakes
- Sire: Speightstown
- Grandsire: Gone West
- Dam: Tokyo Time
- Damsire: Medaglia d'Oro
- Sex: Colt
- Foaled: February 5, 2018
- Country: United States
- Color: Bay
- Breeder: Emory A. Hamilton
- Owner: Grandview Equine, Cheyenne Stable & LNJ Foxwoods
- Trainer: William I. Mott
- Record: 13: 8–2–1
- Earnings: $3,027,560

Major wins
- Mineshaft Stakes (2022); New Orleans Classic Stakes (2022); Alysheba Stakes (2022); Stephen Foster Stakes (2022); Jockey Club Gold Cup (2022)
- Last updated on December 5, 2022

Olympiad (foaled February 5, 2018) is an American retired Thoroughbred racehorse. His graded stakes wins (all in 2022) include the Jockey Club Gold Cup, the New Orleans Classic Stakes, and Stephen Foster Stakes.

== Background ==
Olympiad is a bay horse who was bred in Kentucky by Emory A. Hamilton, a son of Speightstown, winner of the 2004 Breeders' Cup Sprint and was named that year's Champion sprinter. He is the third foal from the Medaglia d'Oro mare Tokyo Time and her first graded stakes winner. Olympiad was bought on behalf of the ownership group for $700,000 by Solis/Litt Bloodstock from the Gainesway consignment to the 2019 Keeneland September Yearling Sale. In 2022 his sire Speightstown stands at WinStar Farm for US$75,000.

His dam Tokyo Time is a half sister to graded stakes winners Hungry Island and Soaring Empire in addition to Flying Dixie, the dam of 2019 Grade 1 Woodward Stakes victor and sire Preservationist. In 2022 his sire Speightstown stands at WinStar Farm for US$75,000.

Olympiad was trained by U.S. Racing Hall of Fame trainer William I. Mott.

== Career highlights ==
In his first graded stakes win of his career Olympiad broke the track record for the 1 1/16 miles distance at the Fair Grounds Race Course in the Grade III Mineshaft Stakes by 1/100 of a second.

Olympiad won his first Grade I in the Jockey Club Gold Cup at Saratoga Race Course starting as the 17/10 favorite and winning by two lengths in a time of 2:02.11 for the 1 1/4 miles distance.

Olympiad finished second to Flightline in the 2022 Breeders' Cup Classic at Keeneland Racecourse.

== Statistics ==
Date	Distance	Race	Grade	Track	Odds	Field	Finish	Winning Time	Winning (Losing) Margin	Jockey	Ref
2020 – Two-year-old season
Aug 1, 2020	6 furlongs	Maiden Special Weight		Saratoga	1.70*	8	3 (Note: Olympiad ran as an entry with stablemate Outlier who finished eighth)	1:09.95	(9 3/4 lengths)	Junior Alvarado	
Sep 5, 2020	7 furlongs	Maiden Special Weight		Saratoga	2.15*	9	1	1:22.78	2 3/4 lengths	Junior Alvarado	
2021 – Three-year-old season
Sep 4, 2021	6 1/2 furlongs	Allowance		Saratoga	7.20	10	2	1:14.33	(4 1/4 lengths)	Junior Alvarado	
Oct 14, 2021	7 furlongs	Allowance		Keeneland	0.90*	10	1	1:21.92	1/2 length	Flavien Prat	
Dec 4, 2021	1 mile	Cigar Mile Handicap	I	Aqueduct	9.60	8	4	1:36.68	(4 1/2 lengths)	Irad Ortiz Jr.	
2022 – Four-year-old season
Jan 15, 2022	1 1/16 miles	Allowance Optional Claiming		Gulfstream Park	0.60*	6	1	1:42.44	7 1/4 lengths	Junior Alvarado	
Feb 19, 2022	1 1/16 miles	Mineshaft Stakes	III	Fair Grounds	1.00*	8	1	1:42.01 (Note: New track record)	2 1/4 lengths	Junior Alvarado	
Mar 26, 2022	1 1/8 miles	New Orleans Classic Stakes	II	Fair Grounds	0.60*	6	1	1:47.74	2 lengths	Junior Alvarado	
May 6, 2022	1 1/16 miles	Alysheba Stakes	II	Churchill Downs	0.90*	7	1	1:41.60	2 1/2 lengths	Junior Alvarado	
Jul 2, 2022	1 1/8 miles	Stephen Foster Stakes	II	Churchill Downs	1.50*	7	1	1:47.66	2 1/4 lengths	Junior Alvarado	
Aug 6, 2022	1 1/8 miles	Whitney Stakes	I	Saratoga	1.85	5	4	1:48.97	(9 1/4 lengths)	Junior Alvarado	
Sep 3, 2022	1 1/4 miles	Jockey Club Gold Cup	I	Saratoga	1.70*	8	1	2:02.11	2 lengths	Junior Alvarado	
Nov 5, 2022	1 1/4 miles	Breeders' Cup Classic	I	Keeneland	26.88	8	2	2:00.05	(8 1/4 lengths)	Junior Alvarado	

Notes:
An (*) asterisk after the odds means Olympiad was the post-time favorite.

== Stud career ==
It was announced on October 24, 2022, that upon his retirement from racing, Olympiad will take up stallion duties at Gainesway Farm.

== Pedigree ==
Pedigree of Olympiad, bay colt, February 5, 2018
Sire Speightstown (1998)	Gone West (1984)	Mr. Prospector (1970)	Raise a Native (1961)
Sire Speightstown (1998)	Gone West (1984)	Mr. Prospector (1970)	Gold Digger (1962)
Sire Speightstown (1998)	Gone West (1984)	Secrettame (1978)	Secretariat (1970)
Sire Speightstown (1998)	Gone West (1984)	Secrettame (1978)	Tamarett (1962)
Sire Speightstown (1998)	Silken Cat (Canada) (1993)	Storm Cat (1983)	Storm Bird (Canada) (1978)
Sire Speightstown (1998)	Silken Cat (Canada) (1993)	Storm Cat (1983)	Terlingua (1976)
Sire Speightstown (1998)	Silken Cat (Canada) (1993)	Silken Doll (1980)	Chieftain (1961)
Sire Speightstown (1998)	Silken Cat (Canada) (1993)	Silken Doll (1980)	Insilca (1974)
Dam Tokyo Time (2010)	Medaglia d'Oro (1999)	El Prado (IRE) (1989)	Sadler's Wells (1981)
Dam Tokyo Time (2010)	Medaglia d'Oro (1999)	El Prado (IRE) (1989)	Lady Capulet (1974)
Dam Tokyo Time (2010)	Medaglia d'Oro (1999)	Cappucino Bay (1989)	Bailjumper (1974)
Dam Tokyo Time (2010)	Medaglia d'Oro (1999)	Cappucino Bay (1989)	Dubbed In (1973)
Dam Tokyo Time (2010)	Flying Passage (2000)	A.P. Indy (1989)	Seattle Slew (1974)
Dam Tokyo Time (2010)	Flying Passage (2000)	A.P. Indy (1989)	Weekend Surprise (1980)
Dam Tokyo Time (2010)	Flying Passage (2000)	Chic Shrine (1984)	Mr. Prospector (1970)
Dam Tokyo Time (2010)	Flying Passage (2000)	Chic Shrine (1984)	Too Chic (1979) (family 13-d)

Olympiad is inbred 3s × 4d to Mr Prospector.
