= Stephen Foster Stakes =

Grade I Thoroughbred horse race

- Class: Grade I
- Location: Churchill Downs; Louisville, Kentucky, USA
- Inaugurated: 1982
- Race type: Thoroughbred - Flat racing
- Website: Churchill Downs

Race information
- Distance: 1 1/8 miles
- Surface: Dirt
- Track: Left-handed
- Qualification: Three-Year-Olds and older
- Weight: 124 lbs
- Purse: $2,000,000 (2026)
- Bonuses: Winner automatic entry into Breeders' Cup Classic

The Stephen Foster Stakes is a Grade I American Thoroughbred horse race for horses aged three and older over a distance of 1 1/8 miles on the dirt run annually in mid-June at Churchill Downs in Louisville, Kentucky. The race is named in honor of famed composer Stephen Foster, who wrote numerous melodies including "My Old Kentucky Home" which is the song that is annually played as the Kentucky Derby field parades on the track.

== History ==
The Stephen Foster Handicap was inaugurated on 19 June 1982 as the Stephen Foster Handicap and has progressed from Grade III status in 1988 to Grade II in 1995 to Grade I in 2002. In 2019, it was downgraded to Grade II. In 2023 the event was upgraded by the American Graded Stakes Committee to Grade I.

Currently offering a purse of $2,000,000, the race draws some of the top older horses from various parts of the United States. Since 2015 the event is a Breeders' Cup Challenge "Win and You're In" event, offering the winner an automatic berth in the Breeders' Cup Classic.

The race was restricted to horses four years of age an older in 1983 and from 1985 through 1987.

The 2006 edition of the Stephen Foster Handicap produced its biggest upset ever when jockey Calvin Borel aboard 91-1 longshot Seek Gold defeated the favored 2003 winner, Perfect Drift.

Four horses used victories in the Stephen Foster as part of their resumes in Horse of the Year campaigns. The four are Black Tie Affair (1991), Saint Liam (2005), Curlin (2008), and Gun Runner (2017). Five horses have won the Stephen Foster and the Breeders' Cup Classic in the same year. Black Tie Affair (1991), Awesome Again (1998) and Blame (2010) won both races at Churchill Downs. Saint Liam (2005) won his running of the Classic at Belmont Park. Gun Runner (2017) won the Classic at Del Mar. Curlin (2008) carried the highest impost of any Stephen Foster winner: 128 pounds. Colonial Colony (2004) carried the lightest winning Foster impost at 111 pounds.

The race moved for one year in 2023 to Ellis Park on the Indiana-Kentucky border as a result of numerous spring meeting fatalities.

== Records ==
Speed record

- 1:47.28 - Victory Gallop (1999)

Margins

- 7 lengths - Gun Runner (2017)

Most wins

- 2 - Vodika Collins (1982, 1983)
- 2 - Recoup the Cash (1994, 1995)

Most wins by a jockey

- 3 - Robby Albarado (2007, 2008, 2009)
- 3 - Pat Day (1985, 1998, 2003)
- 2 - Jose L. Ortiz (2021, 2026)

Most wins by a trainer

- 3 - Steven M. Asmussen (2008, 2017, 2026)
- 2 - Forrest Kaelin (1982, 1983)
- 2 - Jere Smith Jr. (1994, 1995)
- 2 - Patrick B. Byrne (1997, 1998)
- 2 - Mark E. Casse (2011, 2015)
- 2 - Dallas Stewart (2009, 2019)
- 2 - Albert Stall Jr. (2010, 2020)
- 2 - William I. Mott (2011, 2015)
- 2 - Todd A. Pletcher (2024, 2025)

Most wins by an owner

- 2 - Milbert B. Collins (1982, 1983)
- 2 - Richard E. Trebat (1994, 1995)
- 2 - Stronach Stables (1998, 2000)
- 2 - West Point Thoroughbreds (2007, 2009)
- 2 - Claiborne Farm (1992, 2010)
- 2 - Godolphin (2002, 2021)
- 2 - Winchell Thoroughbreds (2017, 2026)

== Winners ==
Year	Winner	Age	Jockey	Trainer	Owner	Time	Purse	Grade	Ref
At Churchill Downs – Stephen Foster Stakes
2026	Magnitude	4	Jose L. Ortiz	Steven M. Asmussen	Winchell Thoroughbreds	1:48.03	$1,998,000	I	
2025	Mindframe	4	Irad Ortiz Jr.	Todd A. Pletcher	Repole Stable & St. Elias Stables	1:47.48	$940,000	I	
2024	Kingsbarns	4	Luis Saez	Todd A. Pletcher	Spendthrift Farm	1:48.09	$1,000,000	I	
At Ellis Park
2023	West Will Power	6	Flavien Prat	Brad H. Cox	Gary & Mary West	1:47.93	$1,000,000	I	
At Churchill Downs
2022	Olympiad	4	Junior Alvarado	William I. Mott	Grandview Equine, Cheyenne Stables & LNJ Foxwoods	1:47.66	$600,000	II	
2021	Maxfield	4	Jose L. Ortiz	Brendan P. Walsh	Godolphin	1:48.53	$600,000	II	
2020	Tom's d'Etat	7	Miguel Mena	Albert Stall Jr.	G M B Racing	1:47.30	$500,000	II	
2019	Seeking the Soul	6	John R. Velazquez	Dallas Stewart	Charles E. Fipke	1:49.27	$600,000	II	
Stephen Foster Handicap
2018	Pavel	4	Mario Gutierrez	Doug F. O'Neill	Reddam Racing	1:49.21	$500,000	I	
2017	Gun Runner	4	Florent Geroux	Steven M. Asmussen	Winchell Thoroughbreds & Three Chimneys Farm	1:47.56	$500,000	I	
2016	Bradester	6	Joe Bravo	Eddie Kenneally	Joseph Sutton	1:48.85	$500,000	I	
2015	Noble Bird	4	Shaun Bridgmohan	Mark E. Casse	John C. Oxley	1:47.94	$500,000	I	
2014	Moonshine Mullin	6	Calvin H. Borel	Randy L. Morse	Randy Patterson	1:49.66	$500,000	I	
2013	Fort Larned	5	Brian Hernandez Jr.	Ian R. Wilkes	Janis R. Whitham	1:47.45	$500,000	I	
2012	Ron the Greek	5	Jose Lezcano	William I. Mott	Brous Stable, Wachtel Stable & Jack Hammer	1:50.51	$437,200	I	
2011	Pool Play	6	Miguel Mena	Mark E. Casse	William S. Farish IV	1:50.52	$561,300	I	
2010	Blame	4	Garrett K. Gomez	Albert Stall Jr.	Claiborne Farm & Adele Dilschneider	1:49.37	$671,700	I	
2009	Macho Again	4	Robby Albarado	Dallas Stewart	West Point Thoroughbreds	1:49.75	$660,000	I	
2008	Curlin	4	Robby Albarado	Steven M. Asmussen	Stonestreet Stables et al.	1:49.68	$1,000,000	I	
2007	Flashy Bull	4	Robby Albarado	Kiaran P. McLaughlin	West Point Thoroughbreds	1:48.63	$829,500	I	
2006	Seek Gold	6	Calvin H. Borel	Ron Moquett	Bowman Couch Racing	1:49.24	$844,500	I	
2005	Saint Liam	5	Edgar S. Prado	Robert J. Frankel	Mr. & Mrs. William K. Warren Jr.	1:47.52	$828,000	I	
2004	Colonial Colony	6	Rafael Bejarano	Walter M. Bindner Jr.	Lakeside Farms (Chris Nolan)	1:50.40	$893,725	I	
2003	Perfect Drift	4	Pat Day	Murray W. Johnson	Stonecrest Farm	1:47.55	$856,500	I	
2002	Street Cry (IRE)	4	Jerry D. Bailey	Saeed bin Suroor	Godolphin	1:50.44	$833,250	I	
2001	Guided Tour	5	Larry Melancon	Niall M. O'Callaghan	Morton Fink	1:47.74	$831,000	II	
2000	Golden Missile	5	Kent J. Desormeaux	Joe Orseno	Stronach Stables	1:49.56	$810,000	II	
1999	Victory Gallop	4	Jerry D. Bailey	W. Elliott Walden	Prestonwood Farm	1:47.28	$827,250	II	
1998	Awesome Again	4	Pat Day	Patrick B. Byrne	Stronach Stables	1:48.61	$799,500	II	
1997	City by Night	4	Shane Sellers	Patrick B. Byrne	Richard & Nancy Kaster	1:50.52	$163,950	II	
1996	Tenants Harbor	4	Francisco C. Torres	Robert L. Desensi	Michael Sheehan	1:49.94	$166,050	II	
1995	Recoup the Cash	5	Aaron Gryder	Jere R. Smith Sr.	Richard E. Trebat	1:49.39	$168,149	II	
1994	Recoup the Cash	4	Juvenal Lopez Diaz	Jere R. Smith Sr.	Richard E. Trebat	1:49.46	$163,500	III	
1993	Root Boy	5	Tommy Turner	Louis D. Bernier Jr.	Richard F. Blue Jr.	1:50.80	$114,000	III	
1992	Discover	4	Brent E. Bartram	Steven C. Penrod	Claiborne Farm	1:50.14	$115,900	III	
1991	Black Tie Affair (IRE)	5	Juvenal Lopez Diaz	Ernie T. Poulos	Jeffrey Sullivan	1:49.80	$109,100	III	
1990	No Marker	6	Aaron Gryder	Patricia L. Johnson	Billy Ray Gowdy	1:49.80	$112,200	III	
1989	Air Worthy	4	Donald Joseph Soto	William G. Huffman	John Carlesimo	1:49.60	$112,700	III	
1988	Honor Medal	7	Luis Enrique Ortega	Neil D. Drysdale	Lettuce Farm	1:50.60	$129,700	III	
1987	Red Attack	5	Jack Kaenel	D. Wayne Lukas	Pillar Stud, Inc.	1:51.20	$103,775		
1986	Hopeful Word	5	K. Keith Allen	Carl E. Bowman	James Clifton, Robert Doll, Barrett Morris	1:49.40	$102,050		
1985	Vanlandingham	4	Pat Day	Claude R. McGaughey III	Loblolly Stable	1:48.80	$79,250		
1984	Mythical Ruler	6	James McKnight	Fred V. Wirth	Albert Risen	1:49.60	$73,550		
1983	Vodika Collins	5	Leroy Moyers	Forrest Kaelin	Milbert B. Collins	1:49.20	$54,750		
1982	Vodika Collins	4	Thomas Barrow	Forrest Kaelin	Milbert B. Collins	1:51.80	$57,900		

== See also ==
- Stephen Foster Handicap "top three finishers" and starters
- List of attractions and events in the Louisville metropolitan area
- List of graded stakes at Churchill Downs
- List of American and Canadian Graded races
