= Maxfield (horse) =

American Thoroughbred racehorse

- Sire: Street Sense
- Grandsire: Street Cry
- Dam: Velvety
- Damsire: Bernardini
- Sex: Stallion
- Foaled: February 17, 2017
- Country: United States
- Colour: Bay
- Breeder: Godolphin
- Owner: Godolphin LLC
- Trainer: Brendan P. Walsh
- Record: 11:8-2-1
- Earnings: $2,001,812

Major wins
- Breeders' Futurity Stakes (2019); Matt Winn Stakes (2020); Tenacious Stakes (2020); Mineshaft Stakes (2021); Alysheba Stakes (2021); Stephen Foster Stakes (2021); Clark Stakes (2021)

Honours
- Grade III Maxfield Stakes at Churchill Downs (2022– )
- Last updated on 15 June 2026

Maxfield (foaled February 17, 2017) is an American Thoroughbred racehorse who won the Breeders' Futurity Stakes at age two, the Matt Winn and Tenacious Stakes at age three, and the Mineshaft, Alysheba Stakes and Stephen Foster Stakes at age four.

== Background ==
Maxfield was bred in Kentucky by Godolphin Stables and races for them as a homebred. He was sired by Street Sense, the winner of the 2007 Kentucky Derby. His dam, Velvety, is by Bernardini and is a half-sister to both Grade I winner Sky Mesa and multiple stakes winner Golden Velvet. The family descends from influential broodmare La Troienne through the branch created by Busanda.

He is trained by Brendan Walsh.

== Racing career ==
=== Two-year-old season (2019) ===
Maxfield made his first start in a maiden special weight at Churchill Downs on September 14, 2019. He got a slow start and was still in tenth place after half a mile, some 8 lengths behind the early leaders. He swung six wide in the turn and began to improve his position as they turned into the stretch. Still in fifth place in mid-stretch, he gradually pulled clear to win by three-quarters of a length.

For his next start, Maxfield was stepped sharply up in class in the Grade I Breeders' Futurity Stakes at Keeneland on October 5. The favorites were Gouverneur Morris, Tap it to Win, and Ajaaweed, with Maxfield going off at 6-1. He again broke poorly and was well back in the early running. As they entered the stretch, he swept past Gouverneur Morris and drew off to win by 5 1/2 lengths. "He's a very nice horse, and he's very smart," said jockey José Ortiz. "He broke slow first time, took dirt, and came running at Churchill. Today, he did the same thing. Broke a bit slow, relaxed, and when I asked him to go, he was there for me the whole time.

The victory made Maxfield one of the early favorites for the 2019 Breeders' Cup Juvenile, but he was withdrawn from the race after he started favoring his right foreleg following a workout.

=== Three-year-old season (2020) ===
Maxfield returned on May 23, 2020, with a third consecutive victory, this time in the Grade II Matt Winn Stakes. Despite the layoff, he went off as the 7-5 favorite in a field of ten that included multiple Derby hopefuls such as Ny Traffic and Pneumatic. Maxfield was bumped at the start and again trailed the field for much of the race. He split between horses on the turn to find racing room, then battled with Pneumatic and Ny Traffic down the stretch. In the final furlong, he drew clear to win by a length.

The wins qualified Maxfield for the 2020 Kentucky Derby (delayed to September due to the COVID-19 pandemic). However, he was withdrawn from consideration when he again went lame, this time due to a condylar fracture in his right fore. He was sent to Rood and Riddle Equine Hospital where Dr. Larry Bramlage inserted a couple of screws to stabilize the leg while it healed.

Maxfield returned on December 19 in the listed Tenacious Stakes at the Fair Grounds, where he was the clear favorite. Breaking more alertly than in the past, he defeated Pat Day Mile runner up Sonneman by 2 1/2 lengths in his fourth consecutive win.

=== Four-year-old season (2021) ===
Maxfield began his four-year-old campaign on February 13, 2021, in the Mineshaft Stakes at the Fair Grounds, where he kept his undefeated record intact with a 3 1/4 length victory over Sonneman despite again breaking poorly. His winning streak came to an end in the Grade I Santa Anita Handicap on March 6. He went off as the even-money favorite in a field of eight and settled in fifth place in a tightly bunched field. In the final turn, he swung out four wide and began to make up ground. However, he could not match the closing speed of Idol, and finished third, beaten by two lengths.

Maxfield made his next start on April 30 in the Alysheba Stakes at Churchill Downs as the 1-2 favorite in a field of six. His main rival was expected to be Grade I winner Roadster. The two favorites stalked the early pace, then launched their moves as they turned for home. Roadster could not match the acceleration of Maxfield and finished fourth. Maxfield drew away to win by 3 1/4 lengths. "I was very confident all the way around," said Ortiz. "We were right where I wanted to be. When it came time to go, he was there for me. He's one of the nice ones."

After an 8-week break, on June 26, Maxfield started as the 2/5 odds-on favorite and won the Grade II Stephen Foster Stakes. After settling midpack, he cleared the field with a furlong to race and increased his margin of victory to 3 1/4 lengths in a time of 1:48.53. His victory assured him a start later in the year in the Breeders' Cup Classic.

In the G1 Whitney Stakes at Saratoga on August 7, Maxfield found the front-running Knicks Go too strong after giving away an 8-length lead on the backstretch, finishing second by 4 lengths in a fast time of 1:47.70.

After anonther eight-week break, Maxfield was entered in the Grade I Woodward Stakes, which was moved to Belmont Park in 2021. He started as the 9-10 favorite, broke evenly, and settled behind the leaders. He then rallied with two furlongs to run and chased the winner, Art Collector. His trainer, Brendan Walsh was pleased with his effort. "He never lets us down!"

In his last start of his career in the Grade I Clark Stakes at Churchill Downs, Maxfield was almost an equal favorite at 6/5 with Midnight Bourbon. With little speed in the field other than 3-year-old Midnight Bourbon, Maxfield was positioned right behind the pacesetter. Midnight Bourbon set fractions of :23.83 and :48 but Maxfield was close behind. Midnight Bourbon showed resistance until the final furlong, when Maxfield took the lead. With 100 yards remaining, Happy Saver loomed outside Maxfield, who won by a half-length in a time of 1:49.06 for the 1 1/8 miles distance.

== Racing statistics ==
Date	Race	Racecourse	Grade	Distance	Finish	Margin	Time	Odds	Jockey	Ref
Sep 14, 2019	Maiden	Churchill Downs		1 mile	1	3/4 lengths	1:37.13	10.10	José Ortiz	
Oct 5, 2019	Breeders' Futurity Stakes	Keeneland	I	1 1/16 miles	1	5 1/2 lengths	1:44.21	6.40	José Ortiz	
May 23, 2020	Matt Winn Stakes	Churchill Downs	III	1 1/16 miles	1	1 length	1:43.05	1.30*	José Ortiz	
Dec 19, 2020	Tenacious Stakes	Fair Grounds Race Course	Listed	1 1/16 miles	1	2 1/2 lengths	1:43.35	0.50*	Florent Geroux	
Feb 13, 2021	Mineshaft Stakes	Fair Grounds Race Course	III	1 1/16 miles	1	3 1/4 lengths	1:43.67	0.60*	Florent Geroux	
Mar 6, 2021	Santa Anita Handicap	Santa Anita Park	I	1 1/4 miles	3	(2 lengths)	2:02.46	1.10*	Florent Geroux	
Apr 30, 2021	Alysheba Stakes	Churchill Downs	II	1 1/16 miles	1	3 1/4 lengths	1:41.39	0.50*	José Ortiz	
Jun 26, 2021	Stephen Foster Stakes	Churchill Downs	II	1 1/8 miles	1	3 1/4 lengths	1:48.53	0.40*	José Ortiz	
Aug 7, 2021	Whitney Stakes	Saratoga	I	1 1/8 miles	2	(4 1/2 lengths)	1:47.70	2.10	José Ortiz	
Oct 3, 2021	Woodward Stakes	Belmont Park	I	1 1/8 miles	2	(1 1/2 lengths)	1:49.22	0.90*	José Ortiz	
Nov 26, 2021	Clark Stakes	Churchill Downs	I	1 1/8 miles	1	1/2 lengths	1:49.06	1.20	José Ortiz	

As asterisk after the odds means Maxfield was the post-time favorite

== Stud career ==
Maxfield stands as a stallion for Darley at Jonabell Farm for a service fee of $40,000.

=== Notable progeny ===
c = colt, f = filly, g = gelding

Foaled	Name	Sex	Major Wins
2023	Englishman	c	Woody Stephens Stakes, H. Allen Jerkens Memorial Stakes

== Pedigree ==
Pedigree of Maxfield(USA), 2017
Sire Street Sense (USA) b. 2004	Street Cry (IRE) b. 1998	Machiavellian	Mr. Prospector
Sire Street Sense (USA) b. 2004	Street Cry (IRE) b. 1998	Machiavellian	Coup de Folie
Sire Street Sense (USA) b. 2004	Street Cry (IRE) b. 1998	Helen Street	Troy
Sire Street Sense (USA) b. 2004	Street Cry (IRE) b. 1998	Helen Street	Waterway
Sire Street Sense (USA) b. 2004	Bedazzle (USA) b. 1997	Dixieland Band	Northern Dancer
Sire Street Sense (USA) b. 2004	Bedazzle (USA) b. 1997	Dixieland Band	Mississippi Mud
Sire Street Sense (USA) b. 2004	Bedazzle (USA) b. 1997	Majestic Legend	His Majesty
Sire Street Sense (USA) b. 2004	Bedazzle (USA) b. 1997	Majestic Legend	Long Legend
Dam Velvety (USA) b. 2010	Bernardini (USA) b. 2003	A.P. Indy	Seattle Slew
Dam Velvety (USA) b. 2010	Bernardini (USA) b. 2003	A.P. Indy	Weekend Surprise
Dam Velvety (USA) b. 2010	Bernardini (USA) b. 2003	Cara Rafaela	Quiet American
Dam Velvety (USA) b. 2010	Bernardini (USA) b. 2003	Cara Rafaela	Oil Fable
Dam Velvety (USA) b. 2010	Caress (USA) b. 1991	Storm Cat	Storm Bird
Dam Velvety (USA) b. 2010	Caress (USA) b. 1991	Storm Cat	Terlingua
Dam Velvety (USA) b. 2010	Caress (USA) b. 1991	La Affirmed	Affirmed
Dam Velvety (USA) b. 2010	Caress (USA) b. 1991	La Affirmed	La Mesa (family 1-x)
