= Robby Albarado =

American jockey (1973–2026)

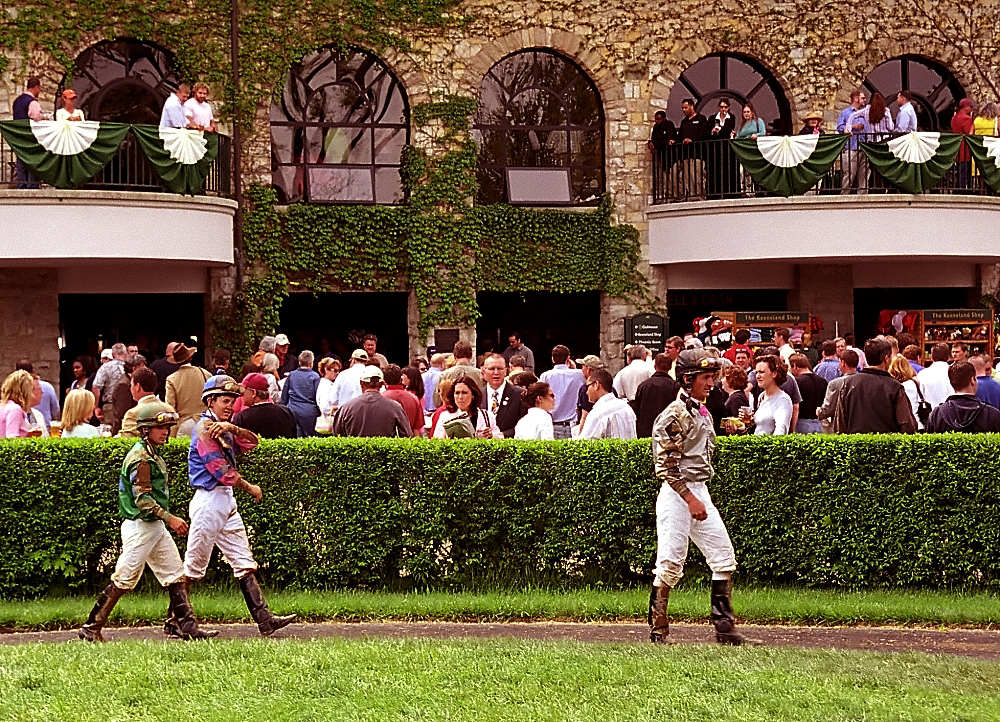
- Albarado (right) in 2007

Personal information
- Born: September 11, 1973 Lafayette, Louisiana, U.S.
- Died: c. August 4, 2026 (aged 52) Saratoga, New York, U.S.
- Occupation: Jockey

Horse racing career
- Sport: Horse racing
- Career wins: 5,222

Major racing wins
- Stars and Stripes (1995, 2000, 2007); Arlington Oaks (1996, 2006); Razorback (1996, 2006, 2013); Mint Julep (1997, 2005, 2006, 2007); Beaumont Stakes (1997, 1999); Indiana Derby (1998, 2001, 2007); Lexington Stakes (1998, 2007, 2010); Maker's Mark Mile Stakes (1998, 2003); Spinster Stakes (1998); Turf Classic Stakes (1998, 2005, 2008); Ben Ali Stakes (1998, 2003, 2004, 2005); Mother Goose Stakes (1999, 2004); Hollywood Futurity (1999); Arkansas Derby (2000, 2007); Arlington Classic (2000, 2006, 2010, 2011); Arlington Handicap (2000, 2001, 2016); Dixie Stakes (2000, 2002); Mineshaft Handicap (2000, 2002, 2008); Azeri Stakes (2001, 2008); River City Handicap (2001, 2002, 2005, 2011); Alcibiades Stakes (2002, 2008); Ashland Stakes (2003); Jockey Club Gold Cup (2003, 2007, 2008); Pimlico Special (2003); Suburban Handicap (2003); Woodward Stakes (2003, 2008); New Orleans Handicap (2003, 2009); Risen Star Stakes (2003, 2004, 2007); Gazelle Handicap (2004); Pennsylvania Derby (2004); Shadwell Turf Mile Stakes (2004, 2008, 2009, 2013); Lecomte Stakes (2005, 2012, 2017); Personal Ensign Stakes (2005); Super Derby (2006, 2013); American Derby (2007, 2011, 2016); Stephen Foster Handicap (2007, 2008, 2009); Arlington Million (2007); Breeders' Futurity (2007); Joe Hirsch Turf Classic (2009); Shadwell Turf Mile Stakes (2009); Spinaway Stakes (2009); Stephen Foster Handicap (2009); Gulfstream Park Turf Handicap (2010); Woodbine Mile (2010); Hawthorne Derby (2011, 2015); Humana Distaff (2011); Lecomte Stakes (2012); Rachel Alexandra Stakes (2012); Virginia Derby (2012); Oaklawn Handicap (2013); West Virginia Derby (2013, 2018); Bernard Baruch Handicap (2013); Firecracker Stakes (2014); Transylvania Stakes (2012, 2014); Ontario Derby (2015); Pucker Up Stakes (2015); Eight Belles Stakes (2015); Doubledogdare Stakes (2016); Iroquois Stakes (2016); Winning Colors Stakes (2016); Breeders' Futurity Stakes (2017); Haskell Invitational Stakes (2017); Matt Winn Stakes (2018); Ack Ack Stakes (2019); Beholder Mile (2021) American Classics wins: Preakness Stakes (2007, 2020) Breeders' Cup wins: Breeders' Cup Classic (2007); Breeders' Cup Juvenile Fillies Turf (2009); Breeders' Cup Mile (2011) International race wins: Dubai World Cup (2008)

Racing awards
- George Woolf Memorial Jockey Award (2004)

Honors
- Fair Grounds Racing Hall of Fame (2005)

Significant horses
- Court Vision, Curlin, Mineshaft, Midway Road, Quiet Resolve, Notional, Tapitsfly, Silver Max, Girvin, Swiss Skydiver

Robby J. Albarado (September 11, 1973 – c. August 4, 2026) was an American Thoroughbred horse racing jockey. He began riding at the age of 10 and progressed to riding at bush tracks in his native Louisiana by the age of 12. After turning professional, he earned his first official win at Evangeline Downs in 1990. Throughout his career, he won 5,222 races including 2020 Preakness Stakes aboard the filly Swiss Skydiver and the 2007 Preakness Stakes aboard Curlin

== Background ==
Albarado's father was a jockey at the bush tracks in Louisiana, and Albarado grew up wanting to race horses. "It's my earliest memory, maybe when I was four, five, six years old," he said in 2007. "I started with basics: cleaning stalls, walking horses and doing whatever it took to be close to it. Eventually I graduated to galloping horses when I was 9, 10 years old. From that point on it's all I wanted to do."

Albarado first began to ride at the age of 10, schooled by Shelton LeBlanc, a trainer in South Louisiana. Albarado began to ride at the Louisiana bush tracks at the age of 12 and turned professional at age 16.

He was married to Paige Albarado, who works for Myracehorse.com as Midwest racing manager. They had a son. He was previously married to Kimber Albarado, with whom he had three children, two sons, and a daughter. He was twice accused of minor domestic violence offenses, though the charges involving Kimber were subsequently dismissed.

== Racing career ==
Albarado scored his first career win on June 29, 1990, aboard One Little Point at Evangeline Downs. His first stakes win came in 1993 with Tuck's Honey Bear at Louisiana Downs in the Grady Madden Memorial. In 1995, he earned his first graded stakes win aboard Snake Eyes in the Stars and Stripes at Arlington Park. His first Grade I victory came in the 1998 Turf Classic at Churchill Downs on Joyeux Danseur.

Albarado's career experienced a major setback when he suffered skull fractures in both 1998 and 1999, requiring surgery where a portion of his skull was replaced with a titanium mesh and polymer plate. He was sidelined for most of 2001 after a fall in late 2000.

In 2003, he received his big break when he got the mount aboard Mineshaft, who scored four grade I wins including the Jockey Club Gold Cup on his way to winning the Eclipse Award for Horse of the Year. In 2005, the pair were inducted into the Fair Grounds Racing Hall of Fame. At the time of his induction, Albarado had won a record seven riding titles at the race course.

He was voted the winner of the 2004 George Woolf Memorial Jockey Award. That year, on December 8, he picked up his 3,000th career win aboard Isle of Silver in the Fair Grounds Race Course in New Orleans.

Albarado was the regular jockey for Curlin, who was the favorite and finished third in the 2007 Kentucky Derby. Albarado won his first Triple Crown race at the 2007 Preakness Stakes aboard Curlin, edging out Derby winner Street Sense. The pair was denied victory at the 2007 Belmont Stakes when Curlin lost to champion filly Rags to Riches by a nose. Albarado later won the 2007 Breeders' Cup Classic aboard Curlin, which was his first Breeders' Cup win. The two combined to win the Dubai World Cup in 2008.

On May 30, 2009, he recorded the 4,000th win of his career, guiding Keertana to victory on the Matt Winn Turf Course in the 9th race at Churchill Downs.

In 2011, Albarado was scheduled to ride Animal Kingdom in the Kentucky Derby but was replaced because of injuries he suffered in a fall three days before the race. Animal Kingdom went on to win the Derby with replacement rider John Velazquez. In 2013, Albarado finished second in the Kentucky Derby aboard Golden Soul.

As of January 2017, Albarado is the third-leading rider of all time at Churchill Downs, ranking behind only Hall of Famers Pat Day and Calvin Borel. He earned his 1,000th win at Churchill Downs on November 13, 2014. In 2008, he won the spring meet riding title with 73 wins. He finished second in the standings seven times and in the top five 23 times.

On January 22, 2017, Albarado achieved the 5,000th win of his career, guiding Vivacious V. V. to victory in the 1st race at Fair Grounds Race Course. "It helps with the right horses, of course but I feel like I'm more comfortable out there and I'm making good decisions," he said in the days leading up to the milestone. "My agent Lenny (Pike) and I have been together for over 20 years and we have a great relationship and we feel great about how things are going. We are going after the right opportunities and the right spots."

On October 3, 2020, Albarado rode winner Swiss Skydiver in the 2020 Preakness Stakes.

On December 11, 2021, Albarado rode in his last career race at Turfway Park As of 2023, he still debated becoming an agent for jockeys.

Albarado played a part in training the 2024 Kentucky Derby winner, Mystik Dan. He also was an exercise rider him.

== Death ==
Albarado underwent surgery on July 30, 2026, to alleviate blockages in his heart. He was released from the hospital and stayed at trainer Kenneth McPeek's house in Saratoga, New York, for recovery. On August 4, less than a week after the surgery, Albarado was found unresponsive by McPeek's wife Sherri, and was assumed to have died in his sleep from complications from the heart surgery. He was 52.

== Year-end charts ==
Year-end ranking (2000–present)	By earnings
2000	14
2001	9
2002	12
2003	11
2004	16
2005	11
2006	13
2007	2
2008	8
2009	9
2010	8
2011	32
2012	48
2013	23
2014	32
2015	27
2016	20
