= Alysheba Stakes =

- Class: Grade II
- Location: Churchill Downs; Louisville, Kentucky, United States
- Inaugurated: 2004
- Race type: Thoroughbred - Flat racing
- Sponsor: Twinspires (2024)
- Website: Churchill Downs

Race information
- Distance: 1 1/16 miles (1.7 km)
- Surface: Dirt
- Track: left-handed
- Qualification: Four-year-olds and up
- Weight: 123 lb (56 kg) with allowances
- Purse: US$750,000 (since 2024)

The Alysheba Stakes is a Grade II American Thoroughbred horse race for horses aged three and older over a distance of 1 1/16 miles (1.7 km). It is held annually in early May on the dirt on the Kentucky Oaks day meeting at Churchill Downs in Louisville, Kentucky, during the spring meeting.

== History ==
The Alysheba became the most recent addition to the Derby Week stakes with the inaugural running on 30 April 2004 as the sixth race on the undercard of the Kentucky Oaks day meeting. It was the first stakes to join the Derby Week lineup since 1997.

The event is named for the talented 1987 Kentucky Derby winner and United States Racing Hall of Fame inductee, Alysheba, who returned to the Downs in 1988 to win the Breeders' Cup Classic. His victory marked the first time a Derby winner had returned to Churchill to win a stakes since Whirlaway took the 1942 Clark Handicap.

The event received graded status in 2007 and was upgrade to Grade II in 2012.

The 2012 winner Successful Dan broke the track record for the distance and held it until Fierceness broke it in 2025 in a time of 1:40.76.

== Records ==
Speed record

- 1 1/16 miles: 1:40.66 – Fierceness (2025) (new track record)

Margins

- 6 lengths – Take Charge Indy (2013)

Most wins by a jockey

- 4 – John Velazquez (2004, 2005, 2015, 2025)

Most wins by a trainer

- 3 – Todd Pletcher (2005, 2015, 2025)

Most wins by an owner

- 2 – Godolphin (2021, 2024)

== Winners ==
Year	Winner	Age	Jockey	Trainer	Owner	Distance	Time	Purse	Grade	Ref
2026	Corporate Power	5	José Ortiz	Steven Asmussen	Courtlandt Farms (Donald Adam)	1 1/16 miles	1:41.82	$750,000	II	
2025	Fierceness	4	John R. Velazquez	Todd A. Pletcher	Repole Stables	1 1/16 miles	1:40.66	$750,000	II	
2024	First Mission	4	Florent Geroux	Brad H. Cox	Godolphin	1 1/16 miles	1:42.03	$730,000	II	
2023	Smile Happy	4	Brian Hernandez Jr.	Kenneth G. McPeek	Lucky Seven Stable	1 1/16 miles	1:41.29	$600,000	II	
2022	Olympiad	4	Junior Alvarado	William I. Mott	Grandview Equine, Cheyenne Stables, & LNJ Foxwoods	1 1/16 miles	1:41.60	$500,000	II	
2021	Maxfield	4	Jose Ortiz	Brendan Walsh	Godolphin	1 1/16 miles	1:41.39	$400,000	II	
2020	By My Standards	4	Gabriel Saez	W. Bret Calhoun	Allied Racing Stable LLC	1 1/16 miles	1:42.24	$400,000	II	
2019	McKinzie	4	Mike E. Smith	Bob Baffert	Karl Watson, Michael E. Pegram & Paul Weitman	1 1/16 miles	1:41.10	$400,000	II	
2018	Backyard Heaven	4	Irad Ortiz Jr.	Chad C. Brown	Kenneth and Sarah Ramsey	1 1/16 miles	1:41.73	$400,000	II	
2017	Bird Song	4	Julien R. Leparoux	Ian R. Wilkes	Marylou Whitney Stables	1 1/16 miles	1:44.34	$400,000	II	
2016	Majestic Harbor	8	Corey J. Lanerie	Paul J. McGee	Gallant Stable	1 1/16 miles	1:43.10	$400,000	II	
2015	Protonico	4	John R. Velazquez	Todd A. Pletcher	Sumaya U.S. Stable	1 1/16 miles	1:42.34	$400,000	II	
2014	Moonshine Mullin	6	Calvin H. Borel	Randy L. Morse	Randy Patterson	1 1/16 miles	1:42.83	$342,000	II	
2013	Take Charge Indy	4	Rosie Napravnik	Patrick B. Byrne	WinStar Farm & Chuck & Maribeth Sandford	1 1/16 miles	1:41.41	$339,900	II	
2012	Successful Dan	4	Julien R. Leparoux	Charles LoPresti	Morton Fink	1 1/16 miles	1:41.04	$337,800	II	
2011	First Dude	4	Martin Garcia	Bob Baffert	Donald R. Dizney	1 1/16 miles	1:42.56	$358,500	III	
2010	Arson Squad	7	Paco Lopez	Richard E. Dutrow Jr.	Jay Em Ess Stable	1 1/16 miles	1:43.28	$169,650	III	
2009	Bullsbay	5	Jeremy Rose	H. Graham Motion	Mitchell Ranch, Frank Lewkowitz & Joe Rice	1 1/16 miles	1:44.29	$170,400	III	
2008	Giant Gizmo	4	Rafael Bejarano	Robert J. Frankel	Stronach Stables	1 1/16 miles	1:43.96	$166,050	III	
2007	Wanderin Boy	6	Corey Nakatani	Nicholas P. Zito	Arthur B. Hancock III	1 1/16 miles	1:43.45	$112,300	III	
2006	Gouldings Green	5	Corey J. Lanerie	Anthony L. Reinstedler	Melnyk Racing Stable	1 1/16 miles	1:42.37	$114,500	Listed	
2005	Limehouse	4	John R. Velazquez	Todd A. Pletcher	Dogwood Stable	1 1/16 miles	1:42.32	$112,900	Listed	
2004	Congrats	4	John R. Velazquez	Claude R. McGaughey III	Adele Dilschneider & Claiborne Farm	1 1/16 miles	1:44.31	$113,600	Listed	

== See also ==
- List of American and Canadian Graded races
