= Matt Winn =

American horse racing executive

Colonel Matt Winn
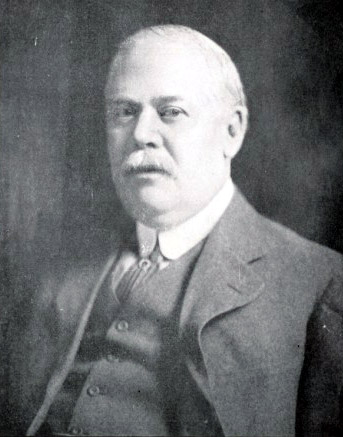
- Winn, 1912
- Born: June 30, 1861; Louisville, Kentucky, U.S.
- Died: October 6, 1949 (aged 88); Louisville, Kentucky, U.S.
- Resting place: St. Louis Cemetery; Louisville, Kentucky, U.S.
- Occupation: Horse racing executive
- Known for: The Kentucky Derby
- Board member of: President, Churchill Downs Incorporated
- Spouse: Mollie Doyle
- Honors: Matt Winn Stakes at Churchill Downs; Matt Winn Dining Room at Churchill Downs Matt Winn Steakhouse at Churchill Downs (2020-Present); Racing Hall of Fame Pillar of the Turf )2017)

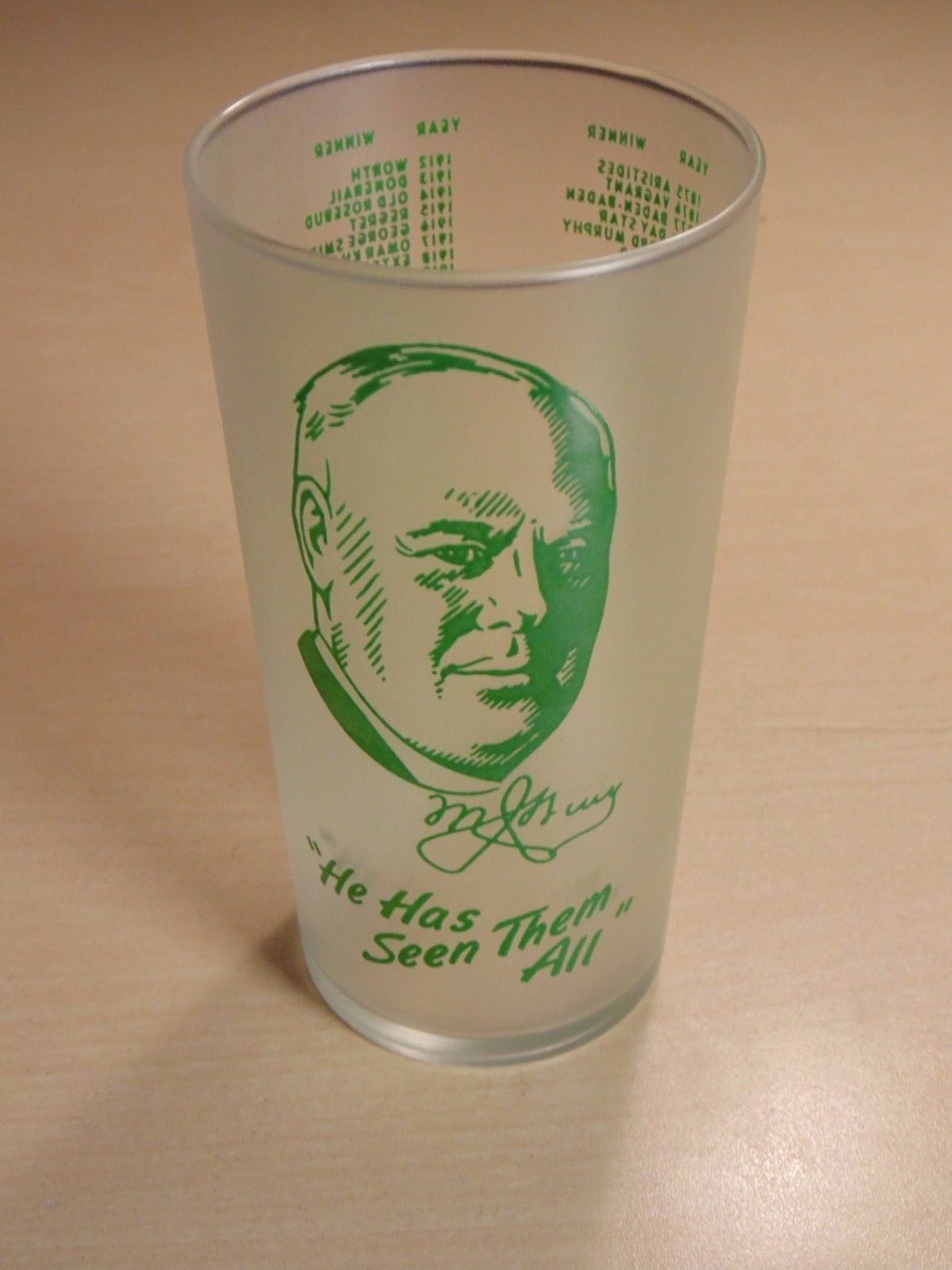
Matt Winn's picture appeared on the official 1949 Kentucky Derby Mint Julep Glass with the caption "He Has Seen Them All." He had seen every derby run, since the first derby in 1875, when he was 14 years old.

Martin J. "Matt" Winn (June 30, 1861 – October 6, 1949) was a prominent personality in American thoroughbred horse racing history and president of Churchill Downs racetrack, home to the Kentucky Derby race that he made famous. In 2017, he was inducted into the National Museum of Racing and Hall of Fame as a Pillar of the Turf.

== Biography ==
Matt Winn was born in Louisville, Kentucky on June 30, 1861.

A businessman, he had been a racing enthusiast since the day his father brought him to see the first running of the Kentucky Derby in 1875. In 1902, Matt Winn was operating as a merchant tailor. He was asked by one of his clients, William E. Applegate, (who, at that time, owned over eighty percent of the New Louisville Jockey Club) to become involved in the reorganization and management of Churchill Downs. Winn came on board as vice president to run the catering operation and summer entertainment and in 1914 he was listed as general manager of the new Louisville Jockey Club. A skilled marketer, in his first year running the racetrack, his promotions for the event saw the business make its first-ever annual profit. A few years later, Winn was involved in changing the wagering from bookmaker betting to a Parimutuel betting system and in 1911 increased business substantially by reducing the wager ticket from $5 to $2.

Matt Winn used his understanding of marketing to weave an aura of romance around the Kentucky Derby. In 1915, he convinced the multimillionaire sportsman Harry Payne Whitney to ship his highly rated filly Regret from New Jersey to Louisville to compete in the Derby. Whitney agreed, and Winn's effort paid off with nationwide publicity surrounding the first filly to ever win the Derby. Winn called Regret's victory a turning point, and he worked to create an event of exotic grandeur that women soon flocked to, coming from both fashionable society and the ordinary working classes. Under Winn, the Kentucky Derby became the preeminent thoroughbred horse race in America and in recognition of his accomplishments, the Governor of Kentucky bestowed on him the honorary title of Kentucky Colonel. In 1937, Winn and the Derby made the cover of the May 10 issue of Time magazine.

In 1944, Colonel Winn collaborated with Frank G. Menke to publish Down The Stretch: The Story of Col. Matt J. Winn.

He died in Louisville on October 6, 1949. He is buried in his family plot in St. Louis Cemetery, 1215 Barret Avenue, Louisville. The Matt Winn Stakes for three-year-olds held each May at Churchill Downs was named in his honor.

== See also ==
- List of people from the Louisville metropolitan area
