= Corey Lanerie =

American jockey (born 1974)

Corey J. Lanerie
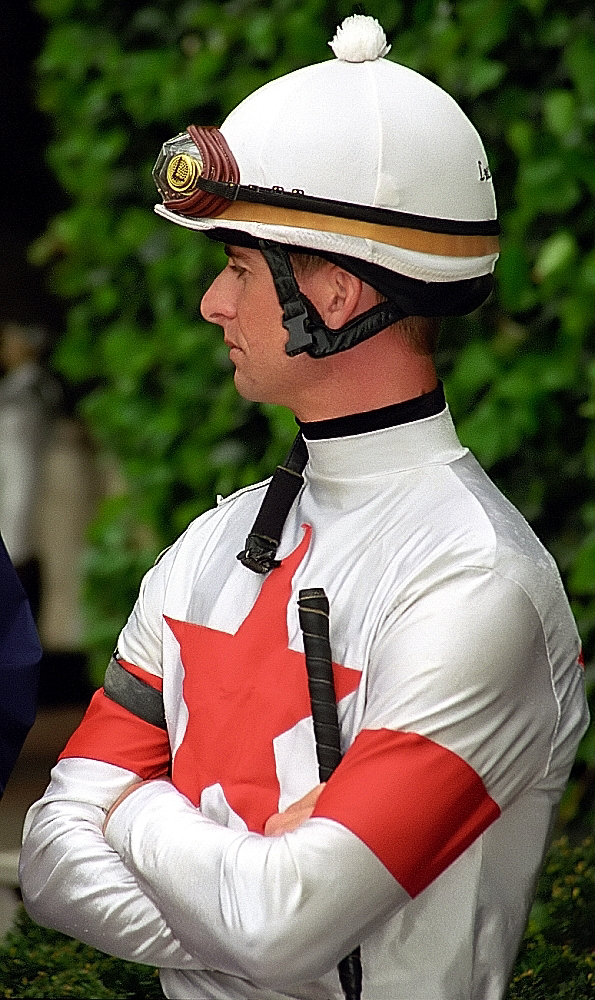
- Lanerie at Keeneland, 2007

Personal information
- Born: November 13, 1974 (age 51) Lafayette, Louisiana
- Occupation: Jockey

Horse racing career
- Sport: Horse racing
- Career wins: 5,000 (as of October 18, 2023)

Major racing wins
- Graded Stakes Wins: Ashland Stakes (2016); Alysheba Stakes (2016); Rachel Alexandra Stakes (2016); Lecomte Stakes (2016); Breeders' Futurity Stakes (2015); La Troienne Stakes (2015); Pocahontas Stakes (2015); Monmouth Cup (2015); Mint Julep Handicap (2009, 2015); Fayette Stakes (2014); Fleur de Lis Handicap (2014); Chilukki Stakes (2012, 2014); Iroquois Stakes (2013); Firecracker Handicap (2012); Jessamine Stakes (2012); Iowa Oaks (2011); Kentucky Cup Distaff Stakes (2011); Raven Run Stakes (2010); Ashland Stakes (2009); Bashford Manor Stakes (2007); Seagram Cup Stakes (2006); Kentucky Cup Sprint Stakes (2006); Mineshaft/Whirlaway Handicap (2016, 2004); Riva Ridge Stakes (2003); Aristides Handicap (2003); Lafayette Stakes (2003); New Orleans Handicap (2002); Silverbulletday Stakes (2001); Robert F. Carey Memorial Handicap (2000); Razorback Handicap (1999)

Honours
- George Woolf Memorial Jockey Award (2014)

Significant horses
- Majestic Harbor, Mo Tom, Brody's Cause, Cleburne, Hooh Why, Kodiak Kowboy, Gouldings Green

Corey James Lanerie (born November 13, 1974) is an American jockey who competes in American Thoroughbred horse racing. Based in Kentucky, he has won 19 jockey titles at Churchill Downs and has won meets at Ellis Park, Lone Star Park, Sam Houston and Retama Park.

Lanerie was born in Lafayette, Louisiana. His father had been a jockey before becoming a horse trainer, and Lanerie's grandfather also was a trainer. When Lanerie was nine years old, he began exercising race horses. He learned race riding at a farm near Opelousas and started his jockey career at small unrecognized tracks. He began to ride professionally in 1991, and won his first race on April 19 of that year at Evangeline Downs on a horse named High Hopes Banquet. He won his first stakes race the following year in the Black Gold Stakes at the Fair Grounds in New Orleans, Louisiana. Lanerie's first graded stakes race win was the Razorback Handicap at Oaklawn Park in 1999.

Lanerie falls within a tradition of "Cajun" jockeys who developed their riding skills in their home state prior to achieving success at major tracks, and follows in the footsteps of other Louisiana natives such as Calvin Borel, Kent Desormeaux, and Eddie Delahoussaye, each of whom was inducted into the Horse Racing Hall of Fame. Lanerie won the George Woolf Memorial Jockey Award in 2014, an honor bestowed upon him by a vote of his fellow jockeys. He is noted for being respected and well-liked by his peers.

Lanerie once said, "I know Churchill better than anybody." Along with his success at Churchill Downs, Lanerie has ridden six times in the Kentucky Derby, with his best finish being second aboard Lookin at Lee in 2017. He has also hit the board in three Breeders' Cup races in 2015, placing second in the Breeders' Cup Marathon and third in both the Breeders' Cup Juvenile and Breeders' Cup Juvenile Fillies.

On October 18, 2023, Lanerie won the 5,000th race of his career at Keeneland aboard I Feel The Need.

His home base is in Louisville, Kentucky, where he lives with his daughter. His wife, Shantel, died on June 22, 2018.

== Year-end charts ==
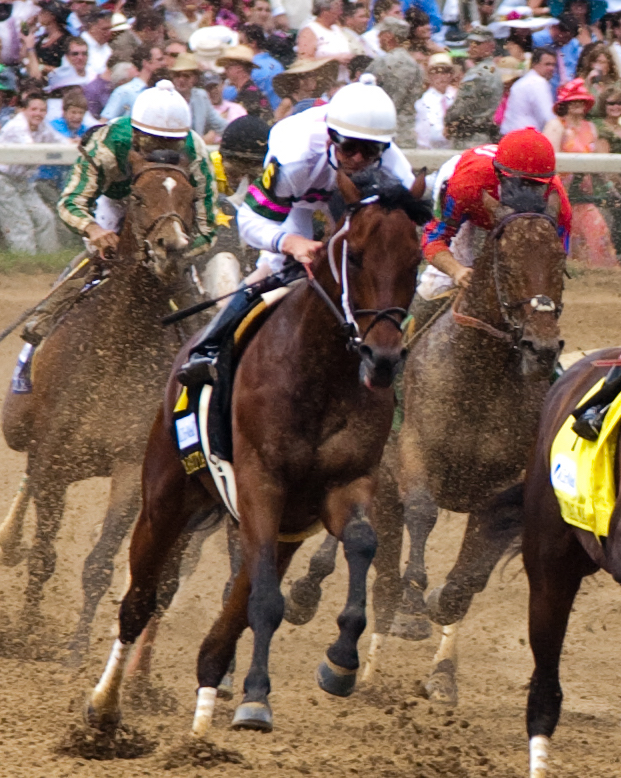
Lanerie (in white silks) on Star Guitar in the 2009 Alysheba Stakes

Chart (2000–present)	Peak position
National Earnings List for Jockeys 2000	44
National Earnings List for Jockeys 2001	58
National Earnings List for Jockeys 2002	37
National Earnings List for Jockeys 2003	30
National Earnings List for Jockeys 2004	65
National Earnings List for Jockeys 2005	44
National Earnings List for Jockeys 2006	48
National Earnings List for Jockeys 2007	43
National Earnings List for Jockeys 2008	64
National Earnings List for Jockeys 2009	39
National Earnings List for Jockeys 2010	51
National Earnings List for Jockeys 2011	29
National Earnings List for Jockeys 2012	24
National Earnings List for Jockeys 2013	32
National Earnings List for Jockeys 2014	26
National Earnings List for Jockeys 2015	15
National Earnings List for Jockeys 2016	18
National Earnings List for Jockeys 2017	15
