= 2013 Road to the Kentucky Derby =

Horse racing point system

The 2013 Road to the Kentucky Derby /ˈdɜːrbi/ was based on a points system that replaced the previous system which consisted of about 185 graded stakes races worldwide. The series is divided into two phases, the Kentucky Derby Prep Season and the Kentucky Derby Championship Series.

The top 20 point earners earned a spot in the Kentucky Derby starting gate. Up to 24 horses could enter the race and four horses can be listed as "also eligible" and would be ranked in order accordingly in case any horse(s) be scratched prior to the race. If two or more horses have the same number of points, the tiebreaker to get into the race will be earnings in non-restricted stakes races, whether or not they are graded. In the event of a tie, those horses will divide equally the points they would have received jointly had one beaten the other. Horses listed as "also eligible" are not allowed to participate in the race once wagering is opened.

The 2013 season consisted of 36 races, 19 races for the Kentucky Derby Prep Season and 17 races for the Kentucky Derby Championship Season.

Standings
| Rank | Horse | Owner | Trainer | Points | Earnings | References |
|---|---|---|---|---|---|---|
| **1** | **Orb** | **Stuart S. Janney III and Phipps Stable** | **Shug McGaughey** | **150** | **$840,000** | |
| 2 | Verrazano | Let's Go Stable, Michael Tabor, Mrs. John Magnier and Derrick Smith | Todd Pletcher | 150 | $810,000 | |
| 3 | Goldencents | W.C. Racing, Dave Kenney and RAP Racing | Doug O'Neill | 129 | $1,208,000 | |
| 4 | Java's War | Charles Fipke | Ken McPeek | 122 | $651,772 | |
| 5 | Overanalyze | Repole Stable | Todd Pletcher | 110 | $908,831 | |
| 6 | Revolutionary | WinStar Farm | Todd Pletcher | 110 | $720,000 | |
| 7 | Lines of Battle | Joseph Allen, Mrs. John Magnier, Michael Tabor and Derrick Smith | Aidan O'Brien | 100 | $1,261,089 | |
| 8 | Vyjack | Pick Six Racing | Rudy Rodriguez | 70 | $505,000 | |
| --- | Flashback | Gary and Mary West | Bob Baffert | 70 | $357,000 | |
| 9 | Will Take Charge | Willis D. Horton | D. Wayne Lukas | 60 | $512,971 | |
| --- | I've Struck a Nerve | Big Chief Racing | Keith Desormeaux | 51 | $305,790 | |
| 10 | Itsmyluckyday | Trilogy Stable and Laurie Plesa | Eddie Plesa Jr. | 50 | $593,600 | |
| --- | Govenor Charlie | Mike Pegram | Bob Baffert | 50 | $444,800 | |
| 11 | Black Onyx | Sterling Racing | Kelly Breen | 50 | $317,130 | |
| 12 | Palace Malice | Dogwood Stable | Todd Pletcher | 50 | $200,000 | |
| --- | Hear the Ghost | Halo Farms / Hollendorfer | Jerry Hollendorfer | 50 | $222,400 | |
| 13 | Normandy Invasion | Fox Hill Farms | Chad Brown | 44 | $258,000 | |
| 14 | Frac Daddy | Magic City Thoroughbred Partners | Ken McPeek | 44 | $240,596 | |
| 15 | Mylute | GoldMark Farm | Tom Amoss | 42 | $363,365 | |
| --- | Elleval | Damian Lavelle | David Marnane | 40 | £304,295 | |
| 16 | Oxbow | Calumet Farm | D. Wayne Lukas | 36 | $346,000 | |
| --- | Violence | Black Rock Stables | Todd Pletcher | 30 | $623,000 | |
| --- | Uncaptured | John C. Oxley | Mark Casse | 30 | $614,804 | |
| --- | Super Ninety Nine | Tanma | Bob Baffert | 30 | $374,480 | |
| 17 | Falling Sky | Newtown Anner Stud, James Covello and Joseph Bulger | John Terranova II | 30 | $207,500 | |
| --- | Shanghai Bobby | Starlight Racing | Todd Pletcher | 24 | $1,797,000 | |
| --- | Departing | Claiborne Farm and Adele Dilschneider | Al Stall Jr. | 20 | $628,000 | |
| --- | Den's Legacy | Westrock Stables | Bob Baffert | 20 | $385,350 | |
| --- | Show Some Magic | J. Kirk and Judy Robison | Henry Dominguez | 20 | $368,890 | |
| --- | Tiz a Minister | S.A.Y. Racing | Paul Aguirre | 20 | $360,780 | |
| --- | Secret Number | Godolphin Racing | Saeed bin Suroor | 20 | $354,644 | |
| --- | West Hills Giant | Long Island Racing, Sunrise Stables, and Bentivegna | John Terranova II | 20 | $281,319 | |
| --- | Forty Tales | Perretti Racing | Todd Pletcher | 20 | $219,789 | |
| --- | Winning Cause | Alto Racing | Todd Pletcher | 20 | $206,140 | |
| 18 | Charming Kitten | Ken and Sarah Ramsey | Todd Pletcher | 20 | $206,000 | |
| --- | Merit Man | Bruce Chandler, Robert McKee and James Glavin | Bob Hess Jr. | 20 | $192,000 | |
| --- | Code West | Gary and Mary West | Bob Baffert | 20 | $156,000 | |
| --- | Carve | Michael Langford | Steven Asmussen | 20 | $149,400 | |
| 19 | Golden Soul | Charles Fipke | Dallas Stewart | 14 | $84,000 | |
| --- | Dynamic Sky | John C. Oxley | Mark Casse | 13 | $307,282 | |
| --- | Capo Bastone | Eclipse Thoroughbred Partners | Todd Pletcher | 12 | $358,274 | |
| --- | Speak Logistics | Hardway Stables | Eddie Plesa Jr. | 11 | $303,700 | |
| --- | Joha | Wade Wacker | Mike Maker | 10 | $427,538 | |
| --- | Power Broker | Gary and Mary West | Bob Baffert | 10 | $257,600 | |
| --- | River Seven | Tucci Stables | Nick Gonzalez | 10 | $206,864 | |
| --- | Snow Boarder | Godolphin Racing | Mahmood Al Zarooni | 10 | $195,448 | |
| --- | Abraham | WinStar Farm and Twin Creeks Racing | Todd Pletcher | 10 | $175,020 | |
| --- | Steeler | Hamdan bin Mohammed Al Maktoum | Mark Johnston | 10 | $170,278 | |
| --- | Mr Palmer | Michael Lauffer and Gregory McDonald | Bill Mott | 10 | $169,331 | |
| --- | Dice Flavor | Noburo Oda | Paddy Gallagher | 10 | $160,500 | |
| --- | Rydillac | Green, Massaro, Lerner, Shay and Dellatore-Bobo | Gary Contessa | 10 | $127,500 | |
| --- | Elnaawi | Shadwell Stable | Kiaran McLaughlin | 10 | $115,200 | |
| --- | Narvaez | Stipa Racing Stable | Agustin Bezara | 10 | $86,950 | |
| 20 | Giant Finish | Sunrise Stables, Gary Tolchin, Aubrey Flanagan and Bob Smith | Tony Dutrow | 10 | $67,650 | |
| --- | Texas Bling | Hall's Family Trust | Danele Durham | 9 | $274,683 | |
| --- | General Election | WinStar Farm | Kellyn Gorder | 8 | $127,410 | |
| --- | Siete de Oros | Ramon Preciado | Ramon Preciado | 7 | $241,450 | |
| --- | He's Had Enough | Reddam Racing | Doug O'Neill | 6 | $484,000 | |
| 21 | Fear the Kitten | Frank Irvin | Mike Maker | 6 | $122,735 | |
| --- | Shakin It Up | Dennis Cardoza and Mike Pegram | Bob Baffert | 5 | $187,600 | |
| --- | Majestic Hussar | Joseph Witek | Eddie Kenneally | 5 | $105,235 | |
| --- | Taken By the Storm | Chasing Dreams Racing | Kenneth McPeek | 5 | $98,960 | |
| --- | Tesseron | Donver Stable | Josie Carroll | 5 | $86,865 | |
| --- | Bern Identity | George and Lori Hall | Kelly Breen | 4 | $628,000 | |
| --- | Fury Kapcori | Rick Awtrey / Jerry Hollendorfer / George Tordaro | Jerry Hollendorfer | 4 | $221,000 | |
| --- | Know More | Reddam Racing | Doug O'Neill | 4 | $210,250 | |
| --- | Escapefromreality | MeB Stables and Brooklyn Boyz Stables | Dominick Schettino | 4 | $83,334 | |
| --- | Ruler of Love | Matthew Rebro Jr., Frank Coniglio, Sidney Ritman, and Richard Redina | Joan Scott | 4 | $94,746 | |
| --- | Nina's Dragon | Yuhong, Nina Bai and Dave Currie | Dave Currie | 4 | $69,690 | |
| --- | Artigiano | Godolphin Racing | Mahmood Al Zarooni | 4 | $68,952 | |
| --- | Pick of the Litter | Carolyn Vogel | Dale Romans | 4 | $65,620 | |
| --- | Fortify | Godolphin Racing | Kiaran McLaughlin | 3 | $268,000 | |
| --- | Clearly Now | Irma Desrochers and Leonard Zenith | Brian Lynch | 2 | $264,598 | |
| --- | Heaven's Runway | K.K. Jayaraman and V. Devi Jayaraman | Joseph Martin | 2 | $151,748 | |
| 22 | Carving | Bob Baffert and Bode Miller | Mike Puhich | 2 | $145,750 | |
| --- | My Name is Michael | Wachtel Stable, Barry Butzer and Dominion Bloodstock | Bill Mott | 2 | $99,741 | |
| --- | Indiano Jones | John C. Oxley | Mark Casse | 2 | $91,477 | |
| --- | Always in a Tiz | MeB Stables and Brooklyn Boyz Stables | Dominick Schettino | 2 | $91,000 | |
| --- | Titletown Five | William Davis, Paul Hornung, and Ed Martin | D. Wayne Lukas | 2 | $87,398 | |
| --- | Delhomme | WinStar Farm and Twin Creeks Racing | Todd Pletcher | 2 | $86,800 | |
| --- | Dewey Square | Siena Farms | Dale Romans | 2 | $75,998 | |
| --- | Cerro | Team Valor International | H. Graham Motion | 2 | $64,125 | |
| --- | Counting Days | Swift Thoroughbreds | Carla Gaines | 2 | $59,646 | |
| --- | Al Waab | Mubarak Al Naemi | Henry Cecil | 2 | $25,306 | |
| --- | Manando | Kaleem Shah | Bob Baffert | 2 | $12,000 | |
| --- | Hightail | Bluegrass Hall | D. Wayne Lukas | 1 | $359,979 | |
| --- | Dry Summer | Michael Britt / Sam House | Jeff Mullins | 1 | $217,680 | |
| --- | Joshua's Comprise | Rose Family Stable | Barry Rose | 1 | $147,277 | |
| --- | Pataky Kid | Swifty Farms | Tom Proctor | 1 | $142,164 | |
| --- | Amerigo Vespucci | Aldie Germania Farms | Timothy Tullock Jr. | 1 | $115,794 | |
| --- | Five Iron | Fred M. Allor | Bryan Lynch | 1 | $109,192 | |
| --- | Channel Isle | Calumet Farm | D. Wayne Lukas | 1 | $107,817 | |
| --- | Quinzieme Monarque | John M.B. O'Connor | Tom Albertrani | 1 | $83,050 | |
| --- | Archwarrior | Alto Racing | Todd Pletcher | 1 | $68,000 | |
| --- | Stormy Holiday | Jer-Mar Stables | McLean Robertson | 1 | $57,800 | |
| --- | Little Jerry | Jaam Racing and Riley Racing Stable | Richard Baltas | 1 | $57,508 | |
| --- | Birdman | Anthony Hogarth | David Simcock | 1 | $43,031 | |
Entrants for Kentucky Derby in blue; "Also eligible" for Kentucky Derby in green; Sidelined/Inactive/No longer under Derby Consideration/Not Triple Crown nominated in gray; Winner of Kentucky Derby in **bold**

Prep season
| Race | Distance | Surface | Purse | Track | Date | 1st | 2nd | 3rd | 4th | Ref |
|---|---|---|---|---|---|---|---|---|---|---|
| Royal Lodge | 1-mile | Turf | $158,994 | Newmarket | Sep 29 2012 | Steeler | Artigiano | Al Waab | Birdman | |
| FrontRunner | 1-1/16 miles | Dirt | $250,000 | Santa Anita | Sep 29 2012 | Power Broker | Know More | Capo Bastone | Carving | |
| Breeders' Futurity | 1-1/16 miles | Synthetic | $400,000 | Keeneland | Oct 06 2012 | Joha | Dynamic Sky | Java's War | Pataky Kid | |
| Champagne | 1-mile | Dirt | $400,000 | Belmont | Oct 06 2012 | Shanghai Bobby | Goldencents | Fortify | Archwarrior | |
| Grey | 1-1/16 miles | Synthetic | $229,677 | Woodbine | Oct 07 2012 | River Seven | Tesseron | Indiano Jones | Five Iron | |
| Breeders' Cup Juvenile | 1-1/16 miles | Dirt | $2,000,000 | Santa Anita | Nov 03 2012 | Shanghai Bobby | He's Had Enough | Capo Bastone | Fortify | |
| Delta Downs Jackpot | 1-1/16 miles | Dirt | $1,000,000 | Delta Downs | Nov 17 2012 | Goldencents | Bern Identity | Mylute | Hightail | |
| Remsen | 1-1/8 miles | Dirt | $250,000 | Aqueduct | Nov 24 2012 | Overanalyze | Normandy Invasion | Delhomme | Quinzieme Monarque | |
| Kentucky Jockey Club | 1-1/16 miles | Dirt | $177,150 | Churchill Downs | Nov 24 2012 | Uncaptured | Frac Daddy | Dewey Square | Tesseron | |
| CashCall Futurity | 1-1/16 miles | Synthetic | $750,000 | Hollywood | Dec 15 2012 | Violence | Fury Kapcori | Den's Legacy | Oxbow | |
| Sham | 1-mile | Dirt | $100,000 | Santa Anita | Jan 05 2013 | Goldencents | Den's Legacy | Manando | Dry Summer | |
| Lecomte | 1-mile 70 yards | Dirt | $200,000 | Fair Grounds | Jan 19 2013 | Oxbow | Golden Soul | Fear the Kitten | I've Struck a Nerve | |
| Smarty Jones | 1-mile | Dirt | $150,000 | Oaklawn | Jan 21 2013 | Will Take Charge | Texas Bling | Always In A Tiz | Stormy Holiday | |
| Holy Bull | 1-mile | Dirt | $400,000 | Gulfstream | Jan 26 2013 | Itsmyluckyday | Shanghai Bobby | Clearly Now | Joshua's Comprise | |
| Robert B. Lewis | 1-1/16 miles | Dirt | $200,000 | Santa Anita | Feb 02 2013 | Flashback | Den's Legacy | He's Had Enough | Little Jerry | |
| Sam F. Davis | 1-1/16 miles | Dirt | $200,000 | Tampa Bay Downs | Feb 02 2013 | Falling Sky | Dynamic Sky | My Name is Michael | Speak Logistics | |
| Withers | 1-1/16 miles | Dirt | $200,000 | Aqueduct | Feb 02 2013 | Revolutionary | Escapefromreality | Siete de Oros | Amerigo Vespucci | |
| El Camino Real Derby | 1-1/8 miles | Synthetic | $200,000 | Golden Gate | Feb 16 2013 | Dice Flavor | Nina's Dragon | Counting Days | Carving | |
| Southwest | 1-1/16 miles | Dirt | $300,000 | Oaklawn | Feb 18 2013 | Super Ninety Nine | Fear the Kitten | Heaven's Runway | Channel Isle | |
Note: 1st=10 points; 2nd=4 points; 3rd=2 points; 4th=1 point

Championship series
First leg of series
| Race | Distance | Surface | Purse | Track | Date | 1st | 2nd | 3rd | 4th | Ref |
|---|---|---|---|---|---|---|---|---|---|---|
| Fountain of Youth | 1-1/16 miles | Dirt | $400,000 | Gulfstream | Feb 23 2013 | Orb | Violence | Speak Logistics | Majestic Hussar | |
| Risen Star | 1-1/16 miles | Dirt | $400,000 | Fair Grounds | Feb 23 2013 | I've Struck A Nerve | Code West | Palace Malice | Oxbow | |
| Gotham | 1-1/16 miles | Dirt | $400,000 | Aqueduct | Mar 02 2013 | Vyjack | West Hills Giant | Elnaawi | Siete de Oros | |
| Tampa Bay Derby | 1-1/16 miles | Dirt | $350,000 | Tampa Bay Downs | Mar 09 2013 | Verrazano | Java's War | Falling Sky | Dynamic Sky | |
| San Felipe | 1-1/16 miles | Dirt | $300,000 | Santa Anita | Mar 09 2013 | Hear the Ghost | Flashback | Tiz a Minister | Goldencents | |
| Rebel | 1-1/16 miles | Dirt | $600,000 | Oaklawn | Mar 16 2013 | Will Take Charge | Oxbow | Den's Legacy | Texas Bling | |
| Spiral | 1-1/8 miles | Synthetic | $550,000 | Turfway | Mar 23 2013 | Black Onyx | Uncaptured | Giant Finish | Taken by the Storm | |
| Sunland Derby | 1-1/8 miles | Dirt | $800,000 | Sunland | Mar 24 2013 | Govenor Charlie | Show Some Magic | Abraham | Shakin It Up | |
Note: 1st=50 points; 2nd=20 points; 3rd=10 points; 4th=5 points
Second leg of series
| Race | Distance | Surface | Purse | Track | Date | 1st | 2nd | 3rd | 4th | Ref |
| Florida Derby | 1-1/8 miles | Dirt | $1,000,000 | Gulfstream | Mar 30 2013 | Orb | Itsmyluckyday | Merit Man | Narvaez | |
| Louisiana Derby | 1-1/8 miles | Dirt | $1,000,000 | Fair Grounds | Mar 30 2013 | Revolutionary | Mylute | Departing | Golden Soul | |
| UAE Derby | 1-3/16 miles | Synthetic | $2,000,000 | Meydan | Mar 30 2013 | Lines Of Battle | Elleval | Secret Number | Snowboarder | |
| Wood Memorial | 1-1/8 miles | Dirt | $1,000,000 | Aqueduct | Apr 06 2013 | Verrazano | Normandy Invasion | Vyjack | Mr Palmer | |
| Santa Anita Derby | 1-1/8 miles | Dirt | $750,000 | Santa Anita | Apr 06 2013 | Goldencents | Flashback | Super Ninety Nine | Tiz a Minister | |
| Arkansas Derby | 1-1/8 miles | Dirt | $1,000,000 | Oaklawn Park | Apr 13 2013 | Overanalyze | Frac Daddy | Carve | Falling Sky | |
| Blue Grass | 1-1/8 miles | Synthetic | $750,000 | Keeneland | Apr 13 2013 | Java's War | Palace Malice | Charming Kitten | Rydilluc | |
Note: 1st=100 points; 2nd=40 points; 3rd=20 points; 4th=10 points
"Wild Card"
| Race | Distance | Surface | Grade | Track | Date | 1st | 2nd | 3rd | 4th | Ref |
| Lexington | 1-1/16 miles | Synthetic | $200,000 | Keeneland | Apr 20 2013 | Winning Cause | General Election | Pick of the Litter | Cerro | |
| Derby Trial | 1-mile | Dirt | $175,000 | Churchill Downs | Apr 27 2013 | Forty Tales | Capo Bastone | Ruler of Love | Titletown Five | |
Note: 1st=20 points; 2nd=8 points; 3rd=4 points; 4th=2 points

== See also ==
- Road to the Kentucky Oaks
