= Itsmyluckyday =

American-bred Thoroughbred racehorse

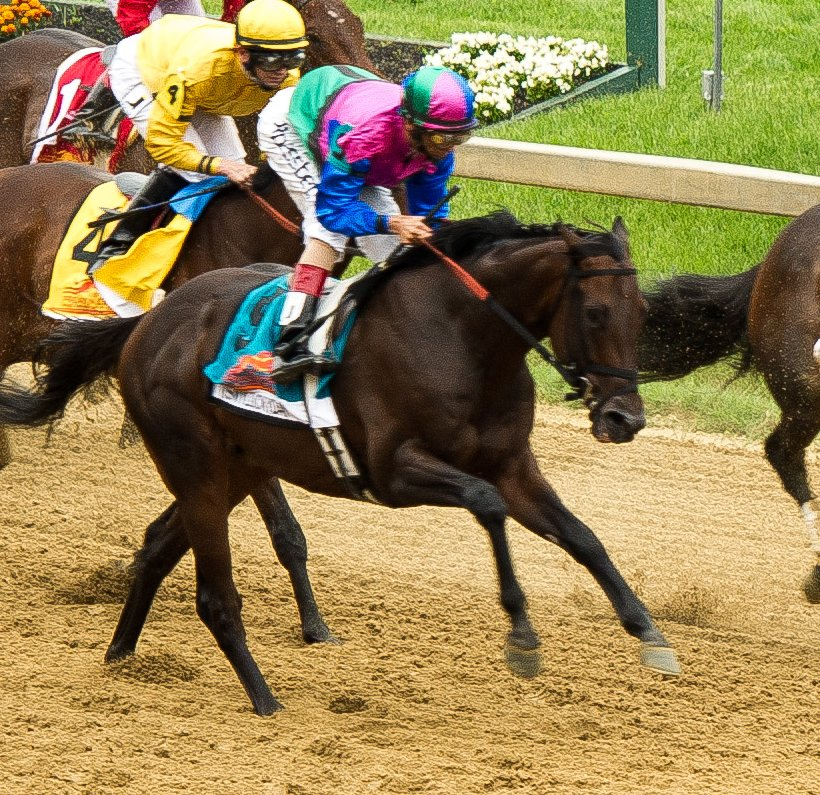
- Sire: Lawyer Ron
- Grandsire: Langfuhr
- Dam: Viva La Slew
- Damsire: Doneraile Court
- Sex: Colt (horse)
- Foaled: 2010
- Country: United States
- Colour: Dark Brown
- Breeder: Liberation Farm & Brandywine Farm
- Owner: Trilogy Stable and Laurie Plesa
- Trainer: Edward Plesa Jr.
- Record: 20: 9-4-2
- Earnings: $ 1,662,600.

Major wins
- Foolish Pleasure Stakes (2012); Turf Dash Stakes (2012); Holy Bull Stakes (2013); Gulfstream Park Derby (2013); Woodward Stakes (2014) American Classic Race placing: Preakness Stakes 2nd (2013)
- Last updated on May 25, 2013

Itsmyluckyday (foaled in Kentucky on March 31, 2010) is an American Thoroughbred racehorse. Itsmyluckyday is a multiple graded stakes winner who finished second in the 2013 Preakness Stakes to Oxbow and won the Woodward Stakes in 2014.

== Background ==
Itsmyluckyday is a dark brown horse bred by Liberation Farm & Brandywine Farm. He was from the second crop of foals sired by Lawyer Ron, the American Champion Older Male Horse of 2007 when he won the Whitney Handicap and the Woodward Stakes.

In March 2012, the colt was consigned to the Ocala Breeders' Sales where he was bought for $110,000 by David Melin. In December 2023, he was sold at an online auction for $41,000.

== Racing career ==
=== Two-year-old season ===
Itsmyluckyday began his racing career at his home track at Monmouth Park in New Jersey in a $40,000 maiden race on June 23, 2012. In that five-furlong debut, he broke third, caught the leaders around the turn three wide and drove clear under jockey Angel Serpa to a two-length victory. In his next start, his trainer Edward Plesa Jr. decided to run him in stakes company in the $60,000 Tyro Stakes at five furlongs at Monmouth. In the Tyro on August 5, Itsmyluckyday broke sixth and finished sixth.

In late August, Plesa took his entire stable down to Calder Race Course for the autumn and winter. On August 25, Itsmyluckyday ran in a listed stakes race called the $75,000 Fasig-Tipton Turf Dash at five furlongs. In this sprint, he broke sixth and advanced to third going into the turn. Itsmyluckyday chased the leaders under jockey Manoel Cruz and drew away to win by four lengths. In his next start, Itsmyluckyday raced in the $100,000 Foolish Pleasure Stakes at a mile and 70 yards at Calder. He broke in fourth under jockey Manoel Cruz, went three wide around the final turn, and drew clear of the field to win by three lengths.

Co-owners Trilogy Stables and Laurie Plesa decided to take a big step up in class November 17 and ship to Delta Downs for the $1,000,000 Grade 3 Delta Jackpot Stakes. That day, Itsmylucky broke in eighth under jockey Angel Serpa and ran in seventh down the backstretch in the mile and 70 yard contest. He went five wide on the far turn and never made up much ground, finishing sixth. The Jackpot was won by eventual Santa Anita Derby winner Goldencents.

Three weeks later on December 15, Plesa wheeled back Itsmyluckyday in the $100,000 Dania Beach Stakes at one mile on the turf at Gulfstream Park. The colt broke in seventh, picked up a little ground, and ran down the backstretch in sixth. He went around the final turn five wide and nearing the wire started picking off horses late, eventually finishing fourth.

=== Three-year-old season ===
On New Year's Day 2013, Itsmyluckyday won the $100,000 Gulfstream Park Derby at a mile on the dirt at Gulfstream Park. He broke fourth and was quickly moved up to second by jockey Paco Lopez. At the end of the first turn, Itsmyluckyday took the lead by a half length and rounded the field five wide to win by six and three-quarter lengths.

On January 26, 2013, Eddie Plesa entered Itsmyluckyday in the $400,000 Grade 3 Holy Bull Stakes. The competition in the dirt race at Gulfstream Park included Breeders' Cup Juvenile Champion and early Kentucky Derby favorite Shanghai Bobby. Itsmyluckyday broke in third one length off the lead under new jockey Elvis Trujillo. Going into the far turn, he pulled up to the leaders and at the top of the lane engaged Shanghai Bobby. In the last furlong of the mile and one sixteenth race, he put away Shanghai Bobby and won by two lengths.

On March 30, 2013, Itsmyluckyday competed in the $1,000,000 Grade 1 Florida Derby at a mile and one eighth at Gulfstream Park. He broke fourth under Elvis Trujillo and stalked the leaders around the first turn and down the backstretch. At the top of the lane, he made a bid but lost to eventual Kentucky Derby winner Orb. Itsmyluckyday finished second, two and a half lengths behind Orb, while beating the rest of the field by three lengths or more.

By virtue of his runner-up performance to Orb in the Florida Derby, Itsmyluckyday went off at odds of 9-1 from the eleven post in the 139th Kentucky Derby on May 4, 2013. He broke seventh and moved up to sixth place passing the stands for the first time and down the backstretch. Pacesetter Palace Malice set sizzling fractions, and all but one horse that was close to the lead fell apart in deep stretch. Itsmyluckyday also fell victim to the pace that day and finished fifteenth, 22 lengths behind winner Orb. Longshot Golden Soul placed second, and Louisiana Derby winner Revolutionary was third.

The Plesas then decided to ship Itsmyluckyday to Baltimore, Maryland, and race in the second jewel of the Triple Crown. At Pimlico Race Course in the $1,000,000 Grade 1 Preakness Stakes on May 18, 2013, Itsmyluckyday drew post nine. He broke sharply in fourth and was in third a head behind second place Goldencents around the clubhouse turn and down the backstretch. At the top of the lane, jockey John Velazquez asked Itsmyluckyday for more and he took off two and half lengths in front of the next horse but still two lengths behind leader Oxbow. Itsmyluckyday finished second, one and three-quarter lengths behind Preakness winner Oxbow. Mylute finished third, and Kentucky Derby winner Orb finished fourth. Itsmyluckyday earned a runner-up check of $240,000.

On his next appearance Itsmyluckyday started second favorite for the Pegasus Stakes at Monmouth Stakes but pulled up injured in a race won by Verrazano. Examinations showed that the horse had sustained a serious pelvic injury: he was off the track for the remainder of the season.

=== Four-year-old season ===
Returning as a four-year-old in 2014, Itsmyluckyday had a new regular jockey in Paco Lopez and made steady improvement in his first five starts. As in the previous year, he began his campaign at Gulfstream where he finished fourth to Palace Malice in the Gulfstream Park Handicap before winning the Best of the Rest Stakes in April. He then moved to Monmouth Park where he recorded wins in the Listed Majestic Light Stakes and the Grade III Salvator Mile. In August he returned to Grade I company for the first time since the Preakness and finished second to Moreno in the Whitney Handicap at Saratoga, with Will Take Charge and Palace Malice among those behind. Four weeks later, over the same course and distance, Itsmyluckyday faced Moreno again in the Grade I Woodward Stakes. He tracked Moreno for most of the race before moving up to challenge the leader approaching the final turn. Itsmyluckyday gained the advantage a furlong out and prevailed by half a length to record his first Grade I victory.

On September 27 Itsmyluckyday started 7/10 favourite for the Grade II Kelso Handicap at Belmont Park. Carrying top weight of 121 pounds he finished third of the seven runners behind Vyjack and River Rocks.

== Stud career ==
Itsmyluckyday was sold to Gigi Chiandussi in 2019 and relocated to Youngstown, Ohio. He stands at Maro Veterinary Services for a fee of $2,000. His best racers are Itsmyluckycharm, Drinkatthecreek, and Bebo Lucky Road.

== Pedigree ==
Pedigree of Itsmyluckyday (USA), bay colt 2010
Sire Lawyer Ron (USA) 2003	Langfuhr (CAN); 1992	Danzig	Northern Dancer
Sire Lawyer Ron (USA) 2003	Langfuhr (CAN); 1992	Danzig	Pas de Nom
Sire Lawyer Ron (USA) 2003	Langfuhr (CAN); 1992	Sweet Briar Too	Briartic
Sire Lawyer Ron (USA) 2003	Langfuhr (CAN); 1992	Sweet Briar Too	Prima Babu Gum
Sire Lawyer Ron (USA) 2003	Donation (USA); 1995	Lord Avie	Lord Gaylord
Sire Lawyer Ron (USA) 2003	Donation (USA); 1995	Lord Avie	Avie
Sire Lawyer Ron (USA) 2003	Donation (USA); 1995	Reddy Change	Mr. Reddy
Sire Lawyer Ron (USA) 2003	Donation (USA); 1995	Reddy Change	Coin Changer
Dam Viva La Slew (USA) 2005	Doneraile Court (USA); 1996	Seattle Slew	Bold Reasoning
Dam Viva La Slew (USA) 2005	Doneraile Court (USA); 1996	Seattle Slew	My Charmer
Dam Viva La Slew (USA) 2005	Doneraile Court (USA); 1996	Sophisticared Girl	Stop The Music
Dam Viva La Slew (USA) 2005	Doneraile Court (USA); 1996	Sophisticared Girl	Close Control
Dam Viva La Slew (USA) 2005	Viva La Viva (USA); 1998	Crafty Prospector	Mr. Prospector
Dam Viva La Slew (USA) 2005	Viva La Viva (USA); 1998	Crafty Prospector	Real Crafty Lady
Dam Viva La Slew (USA) 2005	Viva La Viva (USA); 1998	Viva Sec	Secretariat
Dam Viva La Slew (USA) 2005	Viva La Viva (USA); 1998	Viva Sec	Viva La Vivi (Family 23-b)
