= 2013 Preakness Stakes =

138th running of the Preakness Stakes

138th Preakness Stakes
- Preakness Stakes
- "The Middle Jewel of the Triple Crown" "The Run for the Black-Eyed Susans"
- Location: Pimlico Race Course, Baltimore, Maryland, United States
- Date: May 18, 2013
- Winning horse: Oxbow
- Winning time: 1:57.54
- Final odds: 15.4-1
- Jockey: Gary Stevens
- Trainer: D. Wayne Lukas
- Conditions: Fast
- Surface: Dirt
- Attendance: 117,203

The 2013 Preakness Stakes was the 138th running of the Preakness Stakes thoroughbred horse race. The race was held on May 18, 2013, and was televised on NBC. The race was won by Oxbow. The post time of the race was 6:18 p.m. EDT. The race was the 12th race on a card of 13 races. The Maryland Jockey Club reported total attendance of 117,203, the second highest attendance for American thoroughbred racing events in North America during 2013.

== Payout ==
The 138th Preakness Payout Schedule

Program Number	Horse Name	Win	Place	Show
6	Oxbow	US$32.80	$12.00	$6.80
9	Itsmyluckyday	–	$7.80	$5.00
5	Mylute	–	–	$5.20

- $2 Exacta: (6-9) $301.40
- $2 Trifecta: (6-9-5) $2,061.60
- $1 Superfecta: (6-9-5-1) $1,817.80

== Field ==
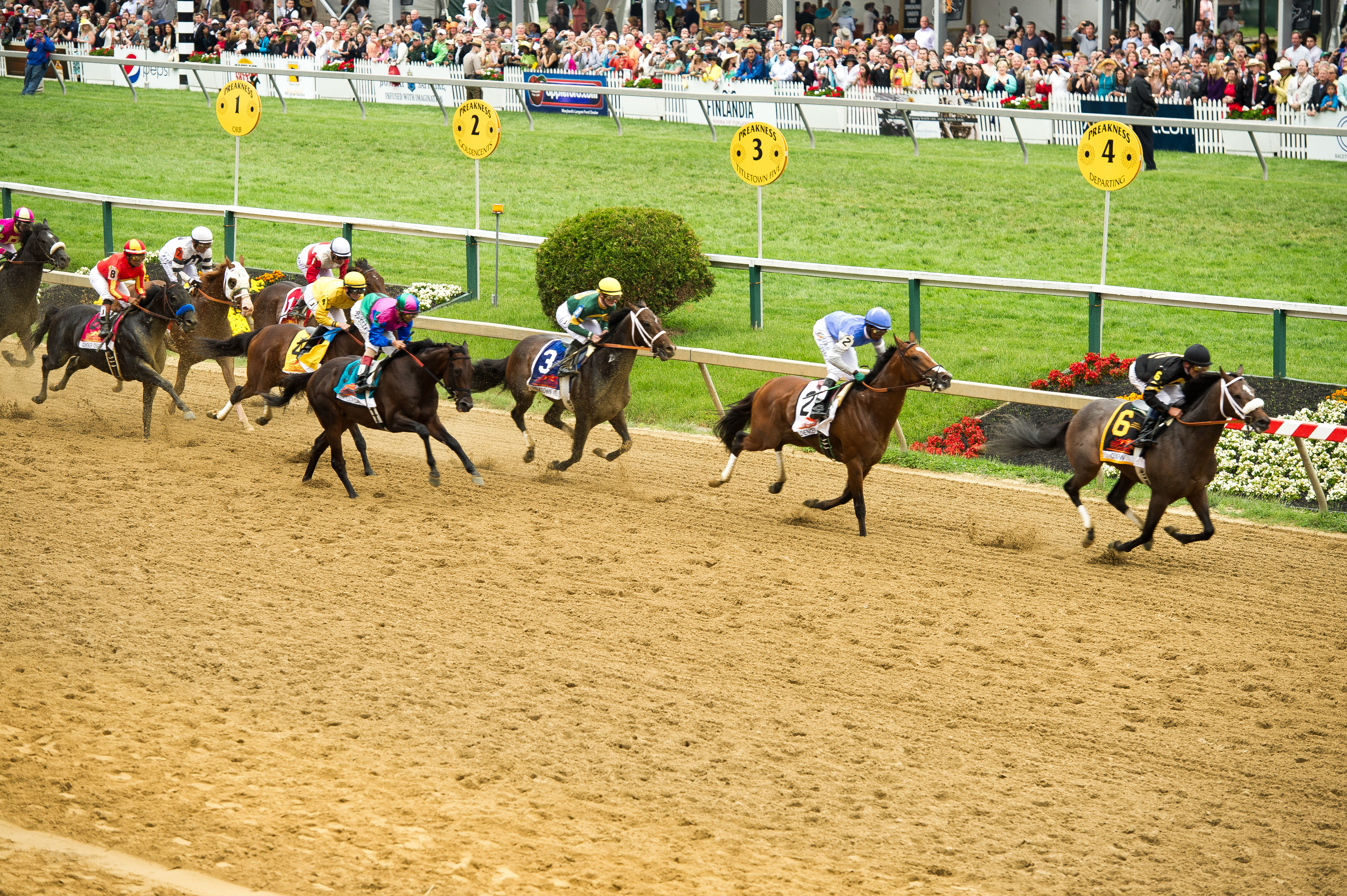
Oxbow (far right) leads into the straight during the early stages of the Preakness Stakes.

2013 Kentucky Derby winner Orb as expected entered the Preakness. It was announced on May 6 that Vyjack and Normandy Invasion would also be starting in The Preakness. Other Derby starters confirmed for The Preakness are Goldencents (17th) and the D. Wayne Lukas trained duo of Oxbow (6th) and Will Take Charge (8th). Later connections of Vyjack and Normandy Invasion withdrew their nominations. Horses that did not start in the Kentucky Derby and were nominated include Illinois Derby winner Departing, Sunland Derby winner Govenor Charlie and Titletown Five.

Nine 3-year-olds were entered for the 138th Preakness Stakes. The post position draw was held at the International Pavilion in the Pimlico Infield at 6 p.m. on May 15, 2013, and were broadcast live on Horse Racing TV using a blind draw. After the draw Orb was installed as the even money favorite, securing the rail.

== Race ==
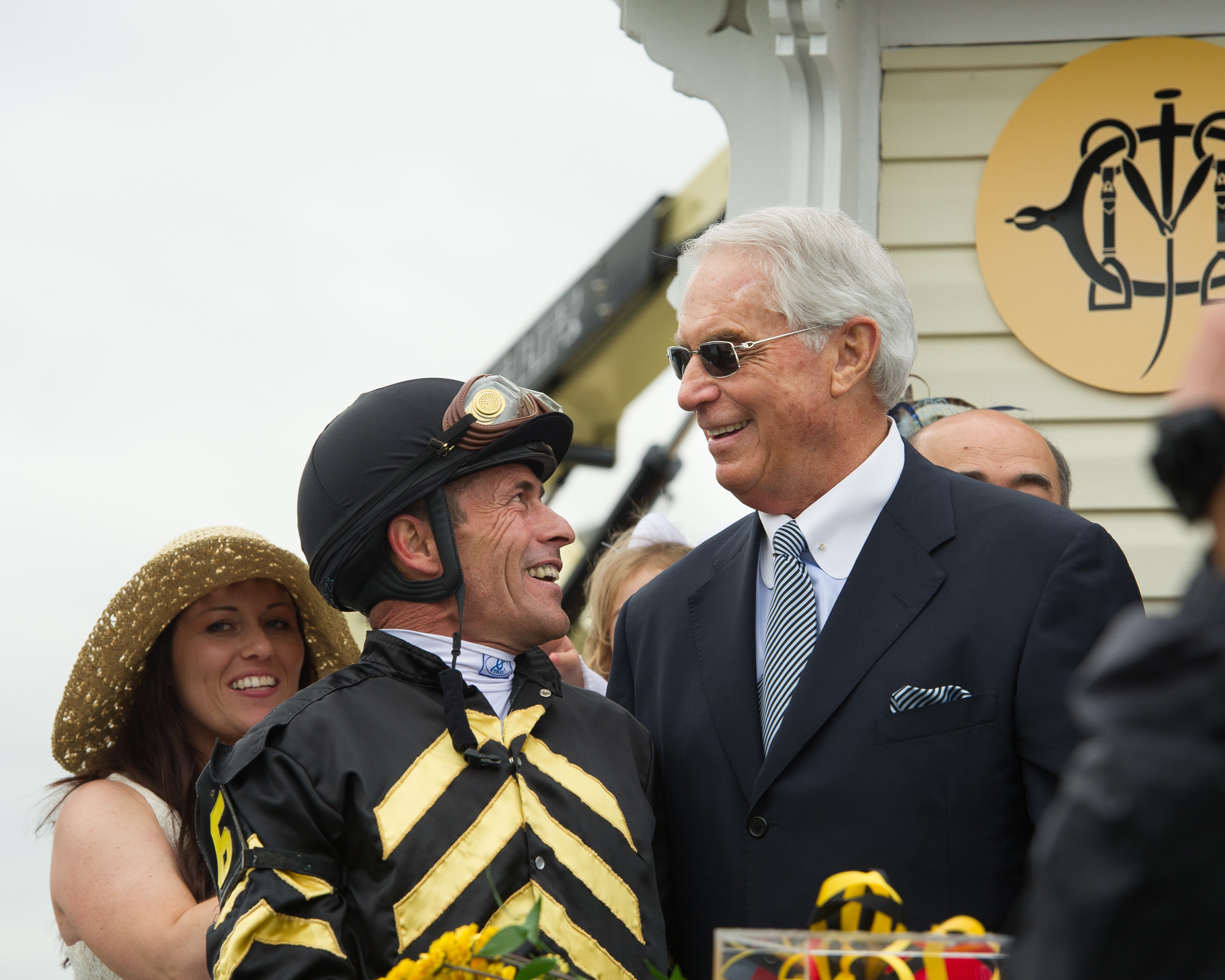
Oxbow was trained by D. Wayne Lukas (right) and was ridden by Gary Stevens during his Triple Crown campaign. Stevens is pictured wearing the colors of Oxbow's owner Brad M. Kelley.

On the day of the race, the Kentucky Derby winner Orb was bet down further from even money of 1–1 on the morning line down to a prohibitive odds-on favorite at 3-5 by post time. Florida Derby runner-up Itsmyluckyday was listed as a distant second favorite at 8 1/2-1 while Santa Anita Derby winner Goldencents was the third choice at almost 9 1/2-1 by post time. Oxbow was relegated to longshot status of almost 15 1/2-1, the only horse with longer odds was stablemate Titletown Five at 22–1.

At the break Oxbow was brushed by Will Take Charge, and then steadied as Goldencents, Oxbow and Titletown Five rushed out to the lead in that order. Orb broke well in sixth place out of nine stakes winning colts. Passing the stands for the first time Oxbow moved to the lead and led by one and one half length over Goldencents completing the first quarter mile in a slow :23-4/5. Making a point to ride three to four paths off the rail Oxbow's jockey Gary Stevens slowed down the pace of the race. Rounding Pimlico's famous "Clubhouse Turn" Oxbow opened a daylight advantage moving ahead by two and a half lengths tipping the clock at :48-3/5 for the first half mile. At this point Orb was running in fifth place only two lengths behind Oxbow.

Racing down the backstretch and entering the final turn Oxbow's lead dwindled to only a length and a half with Goldencents and Itsmyluckyday within striking distance. At the top of the lane Oxbow hit another gear and widened his lead to three lengths over Itsmyluckyday who went six wide and made a menacing run toward the front. The first mile was completed in 1:38 flat on the front end as Derby winner Orb toiled in sixth place.

Nearing the wire, Oxbow, under some hand urging by Stevens, held on to win by one and three quarter lengths over Itsmyluckyday. Louisiana Derby runner-up Mylute closed from the back of the pack under Rosie Napravnik to finish third by two and a quarter lengths (the best finish ever by a woman jockey in the 138-year history of the Preakness). Kentucky Derby winner Orb made up some ground at the end but could finish no better than fourth, nine lengths behind the winner. Just after the wire NBC announcer Tom Hammond exclaimed, "Gary Stevens just stole the Preakness," with Oxbow becoming the first wire-to-wire winner of the race since Aloma's Ruler in 1982. The "Hall-of-Fame ride" allowed Oxbow to conserve enough energy to finish the mile and three sixteenths in a final time of 1:57.54; it was the slowest Preakness winning time since 1961.

== The full chart ==
Finish Position	Margin (lengths)	Post Position	Horse name	Jockey	Trainer	Owner	Morning Line Odds	Post Time Odds	Purse Earnings
1st	0	6	Oxbow	Gary Stevens	D. Wayne Lukas	Calumet Farm	15-1	15.4	$600,000
2nd	1 3/4	9	Itsmyluckyday	John Velazquez	Edward Plesa, Jr.	Trilogy Stable	10-1	8.5	$200,000
3rd	2 1/4	5	Mylute	Rosie Napravnik	Thomas Amoss	GoldMark Farm, LLC	5-1	10.9	$110,000
4th	9	1	Orb	Joel Rosario	Claude McGaughey	Stuart S. Janney III	1-1 favorite	0.70 favorite	$60,000
5th	9 1/2	2	Goldencents	Kevin Krigger	Doug O'Neill	W. C. Racing	8-1	9.5	$30,000
6th	10	4	Departing	Brian Hernandez Jr.	Albert Stall Jr.	Claiborne Farm	6-1	10.2	
7th	16	7	Will Take Charge	Mike E. Smith	D. Wayne Lukas	Willis D. Horton	12-1	11.1	
8th	32	8	Govenor Charlie	Martin Garcia	Bob Baffert	Michael E. Pegram	12-1	9.4	
9th	47 1/4	3	Titletown Five	Julien Leparoux	D. Wayne Lukas	Paul Hornung	30-1	22.3	

- Winning Breeder: Colts Next Stables, LLC; (KY)
- Final Time: 1:57.54
- Track: Fast
- Attendance - 117,203

== Records ==
- Winning jockey Gary Stevens became the oldest jockey at aged 50 years to win the race.
- Winning trainer D. Wayne Lukas won his sixth Preakness to move one behind Robert Wyndham Walden for most wins in the second leg of the Triple Crown and won his record fourteenth Triple Crown race.

== See also ==
- 2013 Kentucky Derby
- 2013 Belmont Stakes
