= Gary Stevens (jockey) =

American jockey (born 1963)

Gary L. Stevens
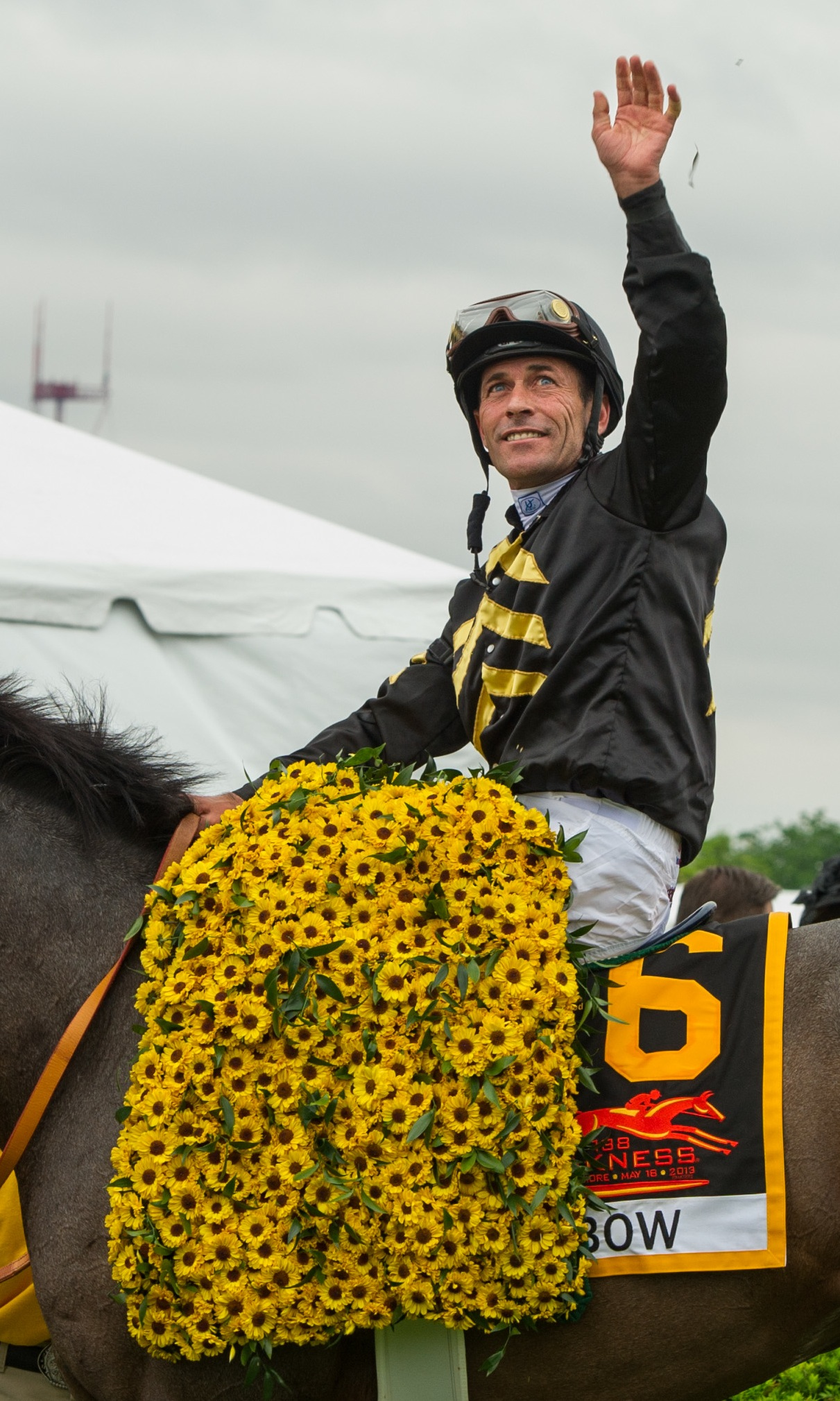
- Gary Stevens at the 2013 Preakness Stakes

Personal information
- Born: March 6, 1963 (age 63) Caldwell, Idaho, U.S.
- Occupation: Jockey

Horse racing career
- Sport: Horse racing
- Career wins: 5,025+ North America, ongoing 5,100+ worldwide, incl.: 55 FR, 50 UK, 20 HK 10 Dubai, 3 JPN, 1 IRE

Major racing wins
- American Classic Race wins: Kentucky Derby; 1988, 1995, 1997; Preakness Stakes; 1997, 2001, 2013; Belmont Stakes; 1995, 1998, 2001; Kentucky Oaks; 1986, 1999; Breeders' Cup wins: Breeders' Cup Turf (1990); Breeders' Cup Juvenile (1993, 1999); Breeders' Cup Juvenile Fillies (1998); Breeders' Cup Mile (1996, 2000); Breeders' Cup Distaff (1994, 1998, 2013, 2016); Breeders' Cup Classic (2013); Grade I stakes wins: Acorn Stakes; 1997; Arkansas Derby; 1985; Arlington Million; 1990; 1997; Arlington-Washington Lassie Stakes; 1986; Awesome Again Stakes; 2013; Beldame Stakes; 1995; Beverly D. Stakes; 1991; 2005; Beverly Hills Handicap; 1994; 1998; Californian Stakes; 1993; Carleton F. Burke Handicap; 1985; 1988; Carter Handicap; 1989; 2003; Charles Whittingham Memorial Handicap; 1991; 1992; 1994; 2003; Clement L. Hirsch Turf Championship Stakes; 1988; 2003; Clement L. Hirsch Stakes; 2015; Del Mar Debutante Stakes; 2002; 2013; Del Mar Futurity; 1986; Del Mar Invitational Oaks; 1994; Eddie Read Handicap; 1995; Fantasy Stakes; 1986; Frizette Stakes; 1995; Futurity Stakes; 1997; Gamely Handicap; 1987; 1992; 1997; Gamely Stakes; 2013; Gazelle Handicap; 1995; Gazelle Stakes; 2005; Haskell Invitational Stakes; 1995; 2001; Hollywood Derby; 1988; Hollywood Futurity; 2000; Hollywood Gold Cup; 1988; 1994; 1997; Hollywood Oaks; 1990; Hollywood Starlet Stakes; 1990; 1991; Hollywood Turf Cup Stakes; 2004; Hopeful Stakes; 1990; 1995; Isle of Capri Casino Super Derby; 1996; Jockey Club Gold Cup; 1992; La Brea Stakes; 1998; 2013; La Cañada Stakes; 1987; Las Virgenes Stakes; 1992; 1993; 2014; Los Alamitos Futurity; 2015; Malibu Stakes; 2004; 2015; Man o' War Stakes; 1995; Marlboro Cup Handicap; 1986; Matron Stakes; 1988; 1995; Moet Champagne Stakes; 1997; Mother Goose Stakes; 1995; Pacific Classic Stakes; 1993; 1997; 2015; Pimlico Special Handicap; 1991; 1997; 1999; Ramona Handicap; 1986; Santa Ana Handicap; 1989; 1991; 1992; Santa Anita Derby; 1988; 1990; 1993; 1994; 1995; 1998; 1999; 2001; 2003; Santa Anita Handicap; 1990; 1991; 1995; 2005; Santa Anita Oaks; 1987; 1988; 1989; 1990; 2014; San Antonio Handicap; 1987; San Luis Rey Stakes; 1991; Santa Barbara Handicap; 1985; Santa Maria Handicap; 1996; 2001; 2002; Santa Margarita Invitational Handicap; 1999; Santa Monica Handicap; 1990; 1994; 1996; 2005; Secretariat Stakes; 1994; Spinaway Stakes; 1995; Suburban Handicap; 1991; Swaps Stakes; 2001; Travers Stakes; 1995; 2001; Vanity Mile Stakes; 1995; 2001; 2013; 2016; Whitney Handicap; 1990; 1991; 2005; Woodford Reserve Turf Classic Stakes; 2001; Wood Memorial Stakes; 1994; Woodward Stakes; 1991; 1993; Yellow Ribbon Stakes; 1996; Zenyatta Stakes; 2013; 2015; Major international race wins: Japan Cup; 1991; Canadian International Stakes; 1996; 1998; Hardwicke Stakes; 1997; Dubai World Cup; 1998; International Stakes; 1999; Duke of Edinburgh Stakes; 1999; Great Voltigeur Stakes; 1999; Dubai Sheema Classic; 2004; Prix Maurice de Gheest; 2004

Racing awards
- George Woolf Memorial Jockey Award (1996); Eclipse Award for Outstanding Jockey (1998); Mike Venezia Memorial Award (1999); Big Sport of Turfdom Award (2013)

Honours
- United States Racing Hall of Fame (1997)

Significant horses
- Da Hoss; Winning Colors; Thunder Gulch; Singspiel; Silver Charm; Victory Gallop; Bertrando; Silverbulletday; Point Given; Royal Anthem; Fantastic Light; Rock Hard Ten; Serena's Song; Commentator; Oxbow; Beholder; Mucho Macho Man
- Updated on August 22, 2015

Gary Lynn Stevens (born March 6, 1963) is an American Thoroughbred horse racing jockey, actor, and sports analyst. He became a professional jockey in 1979 and rode his first of three Kentucky Derby winners in 1988. He had nine wins in Triple Crown races, winning the Preakness Stakes and Belmont Stakes three times each, as well as ten Breeders' Cup races. He was also a nine-time winner of the Santa Anita Derby. He entered the United States Racing Hall of Fame in 1997. Combining his U.S. and international wins, Stevens had over 5,000 race wins by 2005, and reached his 5,000th North American win on February 15, 2015.

His career successes were intertwined with significant injuries and periods of temporary retirement, mostly due to knee problems, from 1999 until 2000 and again from 2005 to 2013. He had an acting role in the 2003 film Seabiscuit. After his second retirement from riding in 2005, he worked for TVG and then HRTV and NBC Sports as a horse racing analyst for seven years, had a brief stint as a race horse trainer, and took a few other acting roles, notably in the HBO TV series Luck, before coming out of retirement again in 2013. In the 2013 season, he won 69 of 383 races and finished the year 12th in the nation in purse earnings, winning a number of significant races including the 2013 Preakness Stakes, the Breeders' Cup Distaff and the Breeders' Cup Classic. In 2014, he rode in the first half of the year, but his knee problems became too severe to continue riding, and in July he announced a "break" in order to get a total knee replacement. He returned to riding by mid-October 2014, accepted mounts for the 2014 Breeders' Cup, and rode a winning race by mid-November 2014. Following the 2016 Breeders' Cup, he again took time off, this time for a hip replacement, returning to racing in March 2017.

Due to his multiple joint replacements and repeated returns to racing, "The Bionic Man" became one of his nicknames. However, Stevens retired as a jockey for a third and final time in 2018 on account of a neck injury incurred after a fall. In 2019, he returned to being a sportscaster, working as a racing analyst for Fox Sports.

== Background ==
Stevens was born in Caldwell, Idaho, the youngest of three sons born to Ron and Barbara Stevens. Ron was a race horse trainer who worked with both Thoroughbreds and American Quarter Horses. Stevens grew up around horses and first rode when he was three years old, assisted by his mother, who had been a rodeo queen. As a seven-year-old child, Stevens had to wear a brace for 19 months due to a degenerative disease of the hip, Perthes syndrome. He began helping his father as a horse groom at the age of eight. In high school, Stevens was a wrestler with potential to obtain college athletic scholarships. However, he dropped out of school in 1979 to pursue a career as a jockey.

Stevens has been married three times and has five children, four from his first marriage and one from his third. He became a grandfather in 2012.

== Career ==
One of his older brothers, Scott, became a professional jockey, and at age 12 Stevens had decided to do the same. By the time he was 14, he was riding American Quarter Horses at small bush tracks. At age 16 he switched to Thoroughbreds, and at 17 won his first race at Les Bois Park, in Boise, Idaho on Little Star, a horse trained by his father. After leaving high school, he spent four months in southern California working for horse trainer Chuck Taliaferro, who had helped develop other young jockeys, including Steve Cauthen and Cash Asmussen. He returned to Boise for about a year, then rode from 1981 to 1982 at Portland Meadows, where he won two awards for his race riding. He went on to Longacres, near Seattle from 1982 through 1984, where he won 524 times, including a number of graded stakes races, broke numerous riding records and was the leading rider two years in a row.

Returning to Southern California in 1984, he began winning Grade I races and rode his first Kentucky Derby on Tank's Prospect in 1985. Stevens' first win in a Triple Crown race was the 1988 Kentucky Derby on the filly Winning Colors. He went on to win the Kentucky Derby again in 1995 and 1997, the Preakness Stakes in 1997, 2001 and 2013, and Belmont Stakes in 1995, 1998 and 2001. He fell short of winning the Triple Crown in 1997 when he won the Derby and Preakness with Silver Charm but came in second in the Belmont. The following year, he picked up his second Belmont win on Victory Gallop, in turn denying a Triple Crown to Real Quiet. In 1993 he became the youngest jockey in history to surpass the $100 million earnings mark and was the fourth youngest jockey to be inducted into the Horse Racing Hall of Fame when he was given that honor in 1997.

He won the Santa Anita Derby nine times, and won eleven Breeders' Cup races, making him the seventh-leading money winner in Breeders' Cup history as of 2014.

At the time of his 2005 temporary retirement, his mounts had collected over $221 million with 4,888 winners in North America, ranking Stevens fifth in all-time winnings at the time. He had over 5,000 wins in 2005 when including overseas victories, including 49 wins in the UK, 55 races in France, and 20 victories in Hong Kong. Stevens considers his 5,000th win to have been in the Gaviola Stakes on October 30, 2005.

Coming back in 2013, he won the Preakness Stakes on Oxbow and added additional wins to his lifetime total, including an international victory in the Shergar Cup at Ascot Racecourse that raised his total win record in the United Kingdom to 50. By 2014, his earnings stood at $236,951,490 and his North American wins were at 4,988. As of 2015 he had 139 international wins in six nations in addition to his North American records. He reached his official 5,000th North American win at Santa Anita Park on February 13, 2015, on a horse named Catch a Flight, trained by Richard Mandella.

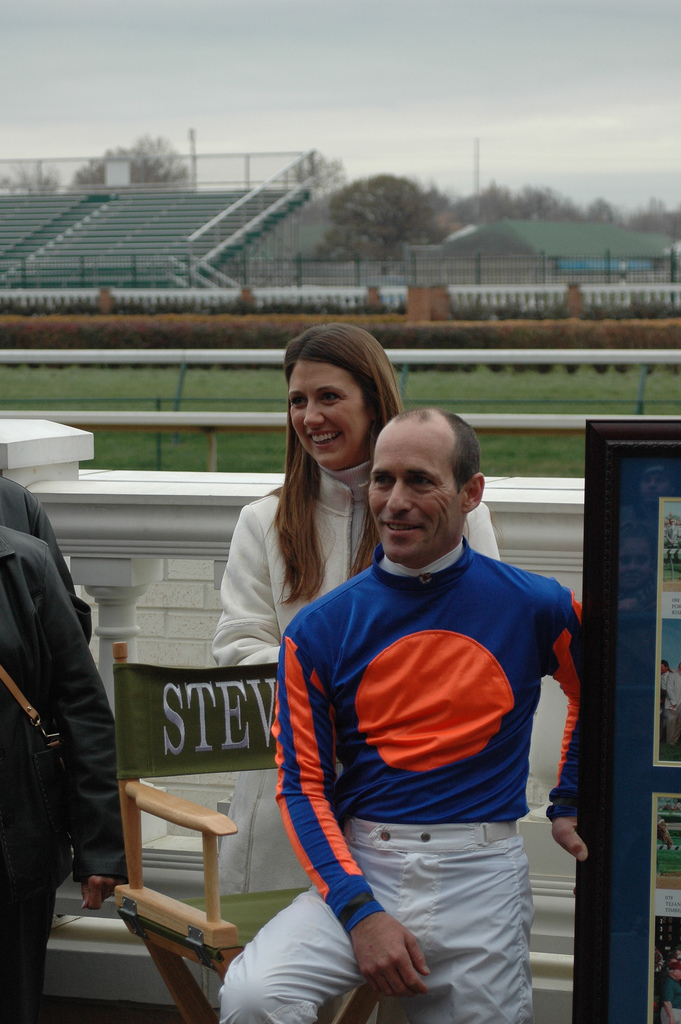
Gary Stevens at his 2005 retirement with his wife, Angie

He retired briefly from racing for ten months in 1999–2000 due to knee problems, but returned after a rest and credited what was his first comeback to the use of nutraceutical supplements containing glucosamine and chondroitin. In 2002, Stevens wrote a book about his life up to that point titled The Perfect Ride. Hall of Fame sportscaster Jack Whitaker described it as: "a great read, not only for horse racing fans, but for anyone interested in how the American dream really works."

In November 2005, Stevens announced a second retirement. His decision was again linked to knee problems, but he reached it a week after Rock Hard Ten, whom he rode to a second-place in the 2004 Preakness Stakes, was retired due to a foot injury. Describing the horse at the time as the best horse he had ever ridden, Stevens said, "He's retiring, I'm retiring." Stevens rode his last races of that year on November 26 at Churchill Downs. During his retirement, in addition to sportscasting and television work, Stevens worked as a jockey agent in 2007, representing Corey Nakatani. In 2009, Stevens also became a horse trainer with the assistance of his son, T.C. Stevens, based at Santa Anita.

=== Film and television ===
In the 2003 movie Seabiscuit, Stevens played jockey George Woolf, receiving generally positive reviews. He was recruited for the role in 2002 by the director, Gary Ross, and worked for four months on the film. He had assorted small parts in other works, including brief appearances in the TV series Jockeys and Wildfire In 2011 he became a regular cast member on the HBO television series Luck produced by Thoroughbred owner David Milch, starring as an on-the-skids jockey named Ronnie. The cancellation of the show in 2012 prior to the beginning of its second season turned out to provide Stevens with the inspiration to return to actual race riding.

Stevens started working in January 2006 as a racing analyst with TVG. Also that month he joined NBC Sports as its lead horse racing analyst. He started a new job as a racing commentator for HRTV in 2008.

=== 2013 comeback ===
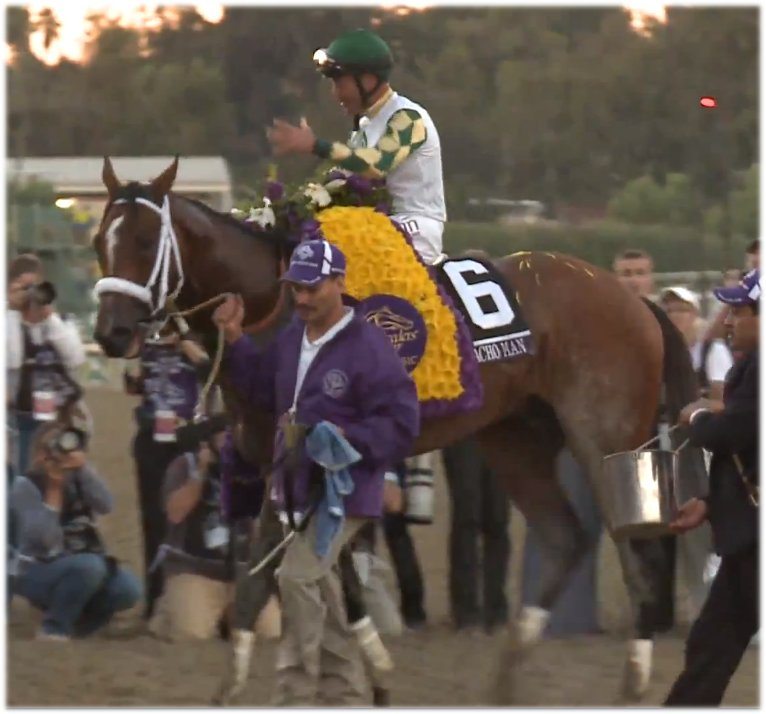
Stevens after winning 2013 Breeders' Cup Classic on Mucho Macho Man

On January 3, 2013, Stevens announced that he was coming out of retirement to ride horses as a professional jockey again. He was named to ride a horse at Santa Anita Park on January 6. On January 12, 2013, Stevens won the first race of his comeback in a maiden race aboard the filly Branding.

Stevens' first graded stakes win of his comeback came in the 2013 San Marcos Stakes on Slim Shadey. He reconnected with D. Wayne Lukas for the Triple Crown series on a horse named Oxbow. The team finished sixth in the 2013 Kentucky Derby, and on May 18, 2013, Stevens and Oxbow won the 2013 Preakness Stakes, his third Preakness win, and on the same day won the Dixieland Stakes on the undercard with the Lukas-trained Skyring. After a second-place finish in the Belmont, Stevens continued to ride regularly the rest of the year, and on November 1–2 at Santa Anita Park, Stevens won his third Breeders' Cup Distaff with Beholder as well as his first Breeders' Cup Classic aboard Mucho Macho Man. His Classic win was the first in 15 total attempts, and he was the only jockey to have ridden in both the first Breeders' Cup in 1984 and in the 30th in 2013. He finished the year 12th in the nation by earnings with 69 wins from 383 races and his lifetime wins total stood at 4,957. His wins for 2013 included 18 graded stakes victories. 2013 marked Stevens' third most successful year since 2000, comparing favorably to his 23 graded stakes wins from 487 starts and 94 wins in 2005 and 532 starts with 99 wins with 22 graded stakes wins in 2001.

In 2014, he had 145 starts and 31 wins, finishing in the top three 54% of the time in the first half of the year, but his knee problems became too severe to continue riding and by July, he announced a "break" in order to have knee replacement surgery. He stated a hope he could return to riding because he was otherwise in good athletic condition. He stated, "In my mind, I'm not finished." Coincidentally, in the same week, Mucho Macho Man was retired from racing, marking the second time a Stevens break coincided with the retirement of a horse he had ridden to racing success. Following surgery in late July 2014, he returned to riding in morning workouts in mid-October 2014 and accepted mounts for the 2014 Breeders' Cup in the Juvenile Fillies Turf and Breeders' Cup Sprint.

=== Injuries ===
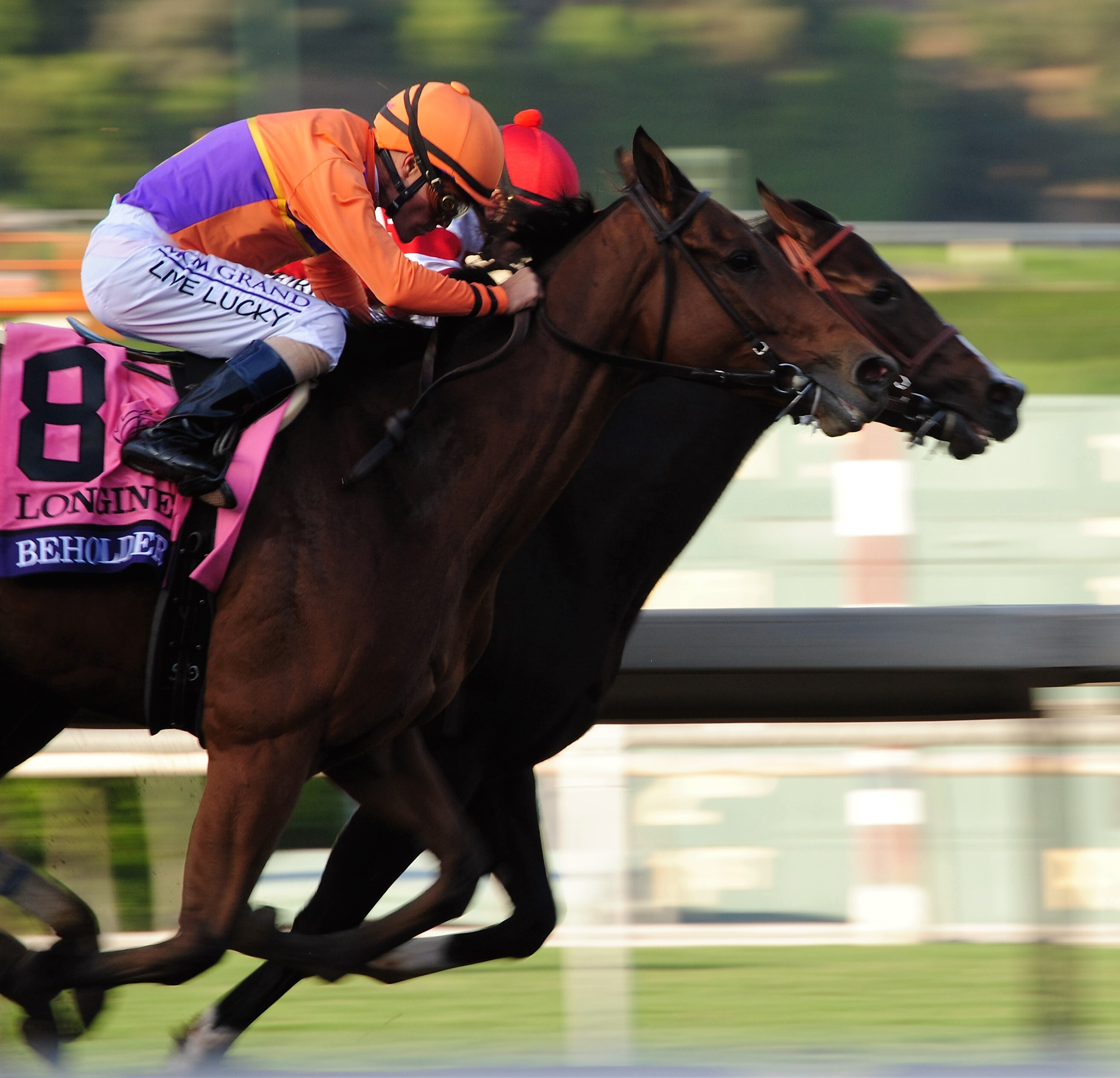
Stevens on Beholder in 2016, two years after his knee replacement surgery

Stevens' career as a jockey has been punctuated by a number of significant injuries. His first major accident was a starting gate training incident in 1985 when a horse threw him into the rail, putting him into a coma for 16 hours and causing serious injuries to his shoulder and right knee. In 2003, he suffered major injuries in the Arlington Million when his horse, in first place, spooked at the finish line, throwing him in front of the rest of the field, where one horse stepped on him, resulting in a collapsed lung and neck injuries. He returned to racing 19 days later. Over the years, he had gone through approximately a dozen medical procedures on his right knee and three on his left, mostly arthroscopic surgeries. In addition to his knee problems, he also had assorted surgeries on his right wrist and both shoulders.

By 2014, his right knee required a total knee replacement. Medical testing revealed he also had been riding with a completely torn ACL. Following surgery, Stevens stated that he developed an addiction to the prescription painkillers he was given, so he isolated himself for a week and went off the medication cold turkey, after which he felt that he finally began to fully recover from the surgery. Three months after the operation, he returned to racing, working horses in the morning, and accepted mounts for the 2014 Breeders' Cup. On November 22, he won his first race following his surgery, an allowance optional claiming race at Del Mar racetrack. He returned to graded stakes-winning form with a Grade II win in the Grade II Arcadia Handicap on January 31, 2015^{:53} and achieved his 5,000th North American win on February 13, 2015.

In late December 2016, Stevens had hip replacement surgery on his left hip. He anticipated a recovery time of about 12 weeks, after which he declared that he intended to return to racing, but indicated that 2017 might be his last year of racing, with the caveat, "unless I come up with a really good 2-year-old who looks like he'll be a major contender for the 2018 Kentucky Derby." He returned to race riding on March 10, and rode a winning horse on March 11, 2017. Due to his multiple joint replacements, "The Bionic Man" became one of his nicknames.

=== Permanent riding retirement ===
On November 20, 2018, Stevens announced he was retiring as a jockey for good due to a neck injury that resulted from an accident at Del Mar on November 17. What was initially believed to be a pinched nerve turned out to be more serious. “[T]he C-4 is up against the spinal cord,” he said, “There won't be any comeback from this one.” He made the decision after doctors informed him that the spinal injury could lead to a far more serious issue if he were to ever fall again. In 2019, he returned to being a sportscaster, working as a racing analyst for Fox Sports.

== Awards ==
Stevens has won numerous awards and prizes in the horse racing industry, including the George Woolf Memorial Jockey Award in 1996. In 1997, Stevens entered the National Museum of Racing and Hall of Fame and in 1998, he was voted the Eclipse Award for Outstanding Jockey in the United States. In 1999, he was voted the Mike Venezia Memorial Award. In 2003, he was a member of the first group of inductees to the Washington Thoroughbred Racing Hall of Fame. James Risch, Governor of Idaho, proclaimed the week of July 10, 2006, to be Gary Stevens Week. In 2013, he won the Big Sport of Turfdom award from the Turf Publicists of America, recognizing his contributions to the enhancement of Thoroughbred racing news coverage. He was also nominated for that year's Eclipse Award, and his contributions to the success of Mucho Macho Man were noted when that horse was the recipient of the 2013 Secretariat Vox Populi Award.

== Statistics ==
Chart (2000–present)	Rank by earnings
National Earnings List for Jockeys 2000	75
National Earnings List for Jockeys 2001	7
National Earnings List for Jockeys 2002	55
National Earnings List for Jockeys 2003	34
National Earnings List for Jockeys 2004	67
National Earnings List for Jockeys 2005	15
National Earnings List for Jockeys 2013	12
National Earnings List for Jockeys 2014	55
National Earnings List for Jockeys 2015	25
National Earnings List for Jockeys 2016	31
National Earnings List for Jockeys 2017	81
National Earnings List for Jockeys 2018	43

Preceded by Jerry D. Bailey	Jockeys' Guild President; 1996–2000	Succeeded by Pat Day
