= 2013 Kentucky Derby =

Horse race

139th Kentucky Derby
- Kentucky Derby
- Official logo for the 2013 Kentucky Derby
- Location: Churchill Downs
- Date: May 4, 2013
- Winning horse: Orb
- Winning time: 2:02.89
- Starting price: 5:1
- Jockey: Joel Rosario
- Trainer: Claude McGaughey III
- Owner: Stuart S. Janney III & Phipps Stable
- Conditions: Sloppy (sealed)
- Surface: Dirt
- Attendance: 151,616

The 139th running of the Kentucky Derby commenced at 6:33 pm Eastern Daylight Time (EDT) on May 4, 2013, at Churchill Downs. The race was televised in the United States on the NBC television network. The favorite, Orb, won a purse of $1.4 million with a final time of 2:02.89, with Golden Soul finishing second and Revolutionary placing third.

The attendance for the race was 151,616. Security was increased in the aftermath of the Boston Marathon bombings; coolers and large purses were banned.

== Qualification ==
For the first time, the colts making the field in the Kentucky Derby qualified under a new points system. In years past, colts qualified based on graded stakes earnings. A total of thirty-six races, with the first coming last year, gave Derby starters an opportunity to accumulate points towards an entry into the race. Twenty horses qualified for the Kentucky Derby with two other horses (Fear the Kitten and Carving) listed as "also eligible" in case one of the starters would be scratched prior to the opening of betting.

== Payout ==
The 139th Kentucky Derby Payout Schedule

Program Number	Horse Name	Win	Place	Show
16	Orb	US$12.80	$7.40	$5.40
4	Golden Soul	–	$38.60	$19.60
3	Revolutionary	–	–	$5.40

- $2 Exacta: (16–4) $981.60
- $1 Trifecta: (16–4–3) $3,462.80
- $1 Superfecta: (16–4–3–5) $28,542.00

== Field ==
After the draw of the field, Orb, the Florida Derby winner, was the 7:2 favorite. Trainer Todd Pletcher had five different horses in the race, including the winners of the Arkansas Derby (Overanalyze), Louisiana Derby (Revolutionary) and Wood Memorial (Verrazano). Among jockeys, noteworthy entrants were Kevin Krigger, who rode Goldencents, trying to become the first black jockey to win since Jimmy Winkfield in 1902, and Rosie Napravnik, riding Mylute, attempting to become the first female jockey to win the Derby.

=== Scratches ===
Black Onyx was scratched late after early betting began. As a result, it was too late for Fear the Kitten, who would have been eligible in the case of scratch, to enter the race. Connections for Carving, who was listed as "also eligible" after Fear the Kitten, elected not to make the trip to the Derby.

== Race ==
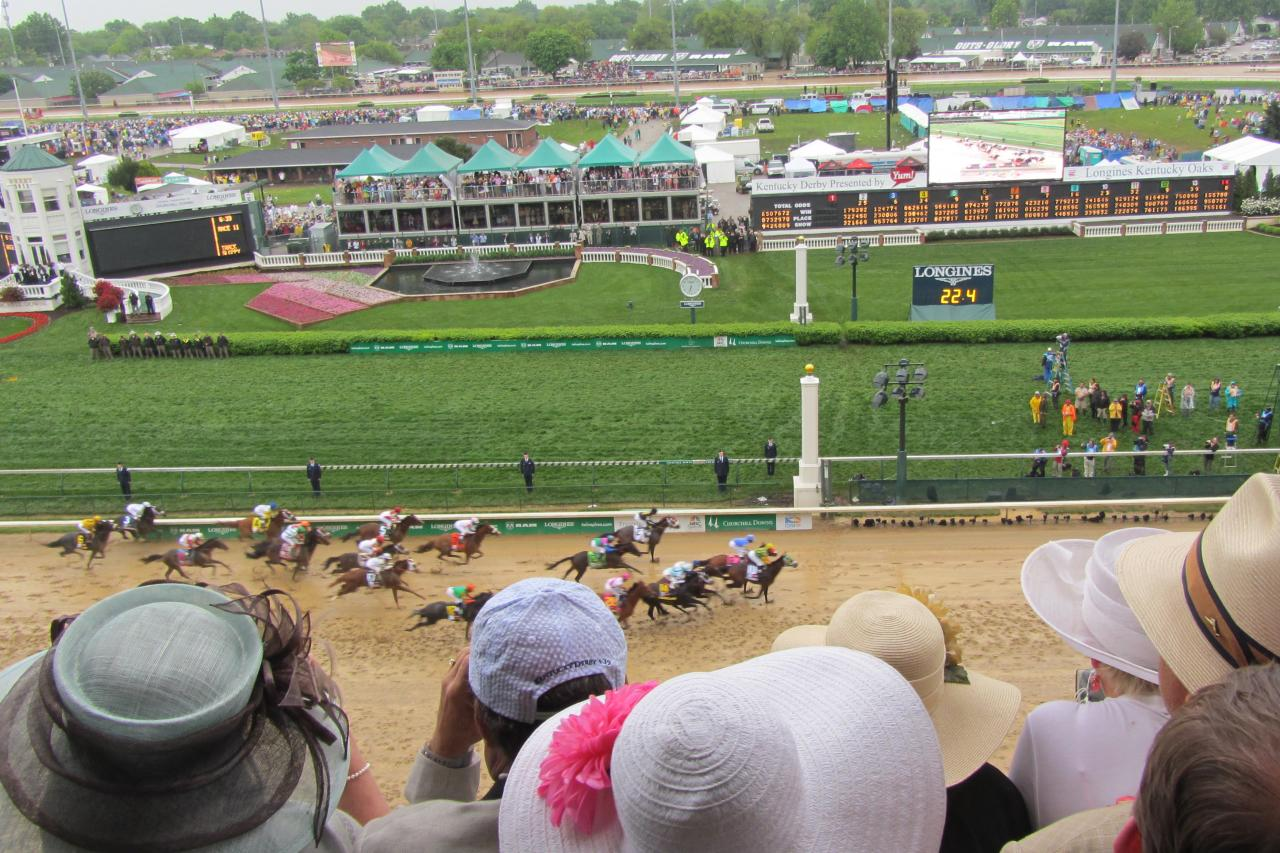
First lap of the Kentucky Derby.

On race day, rain fell steadily throughout the morning and early afternoon. The rain stopped before the start of the Derby, but the track conditions remained cold and "sloppy". All the pre-race favorites drew favorable posts. Black Onyx drew lane one, which was left open when he scratched.

The Derby got off to a very fast start as Palace Malice took the early lead. As Normandy Invasion seized the lead, Orb was just about in last place. "I was so far behind. I just let him be calm and relaxed, and he was able to do it," said Orb jockey Joel Rosario. "He was very relaxed and did exactly what I wanted. It was a perfect trip."

Orb rallied down the stretch, winning by 2 1/2 lengths in a time of 2:02.89. The win gave Hall of Fame trainer and native Kentuckian Shug McGaughey his first career Kentucky Derby victory. His horses were 0–6 in six previous Derby starts. "I've always dreamed of this day and it finally came," McGaughey remarked. "I'm thrilled for the people who put in so much time on this horse, and of course I'm thrilled for me." The win supplemented a record setting season for Rosario. He racked up 38 victories in the spring session, the most ever, and in March won the world's richest horse race - the $10 million Dubai World Cup. The Derby marked Orb's fifth consecutive win, earning $1,414,800 and bringing the horse's lifetime winnings to $2,335,850. He was owned by Ogden Mills Phipps and Stuart Janney III.

Golden Soul took second place while Revolutionary finished third. Revolutionary trainer, Todd Pletcher, who had a record tying five horses in the field, remarked "I thought he ran super. He got shuffled back farther than we thought and he had to keep waiting to try to make up ground ... He closed strongly and just ran out of ground." Normandy Invasion and Mylute rounded out the top five. Riding Mylute, Rosie Napravnik's fifth-place finish was the highest ever by a female jockey, besting her own record of ninth place set in 2011.

=== Results ===
Position	Post	Horse	Jockey	Trainer	Morning Odds	Final Odds	Stakes	Points
1	15	Orb	Joel Rosario	Claude McGaughey III	7:2	5.4	$1,414,800	150
2	3	Golden Soul	Robby Albarado	Dallas Stewart	50:1	35.4	$400,000	14
3	2	Revolutionary	Calvin Borel	Todd Pletcher	10:1	6.4	$200,000	110
4	4	Normandy Invasion	Javier Castellano	Chad Brown	12:1	9.3	$100,000	44
5	5	Mylute	Rosie Napravnik	Thomas M. Amoss	15:1	15.3	$60,000	42
6	1	Oxbow	Gary Stevens	D. Wayne Lukas	30:1	24.9		36
7	10	Lines of Battle	Ryan Moore	Aidan O'Brien	30:1	31.9		100
8	16	Will Take Charge	Jon Court	D. Wayne Lukas	20:1	36.4		60
9	14	Charming Kitten	Edgar Prado	Todd Pletcher	20:1	33.2		20
10	6	Giant Finish	Jose L. Espinoza	Anthony W. Dutrow	50:1	38.6		10
11	8	Overanalyze	Rafael Bejarano	Todd Pletcher	15:1	16.2		110
12	9	Palace Malice	Mike E. Smith	Todd Pletcher	20:1	23.7		50
13	18	Java's War	Julien Leparoux	Kenneth McPeek	15:1	21.5		122
14	13	Verrazano	John R. Velazquez	Todd Pletcher	4:1	8.7		150
15	11	Itsmyluckyday	Elvis Trujillo	Edward Plesa, Jr.	15:1	9.5		50
16	17	Frac Daddy	Victor LeBron	Kenneth McPeek	50:1	25.0		44
17	7	Goldencents	Kevin Krigger	Doug O'Neill	5:1	7.9		129
18	19	Vyjack	Garrett K. Gomez	Rudy Rodriguez	50:1	18.8		70
19	12	Falling Sky	Luis Saez	John Terranova II	50:1	39.7		30
Scratched		Black Onyx	~~Joe Bravo~~	~~Kelly J. Breen~~	50:1	SCR		50
DNR	Did not start	Fear the Kitten	~~Alan Garcia~~	~~Michael J. Maker~~	DNR	-		6

- Margins – 2 1/2 lengths, 1 length
- Time – 2:02:89
- Track – Sloppy (sealed)
- Fear the Kitten was eligible but did not race.

=== Wagering ===
According to live odds on the Kentucky Derby website, more than $4.7 million was wagered on Orb of the $36.6 million gambled on the race, making the horse a 5:1 favorite as betting closed.

Just minutes before, Orb pulled even with Revolutionary as a 6:1 favorite even though more than $4 million was bet on Revolutionary and approximately $3.5 million on Orb.

== Subsequent Grade I wins ==
Although Orb never won another race, several members of the Derby field went on to subsequent Grade I victories.

- Oxbow – 2013 Preakness Stakes
- Lines of Battle – 2015 Champions & Chater Cup
- Will Take Charge – 2013 Travers Stakes, Clark Handicap
- Palace Malice – 2013 Belmont Stakes, 2014 Metropolitan Handicap
- Verrazano – Haskell Invitational
- Itsmyluckyday – 2014 Woodward Stakes
- Goldencents – 2013 & 2014 Breeders' Cup Dirt Mile
