= Palace Malice =

American-bred Thoroughbred racehorse

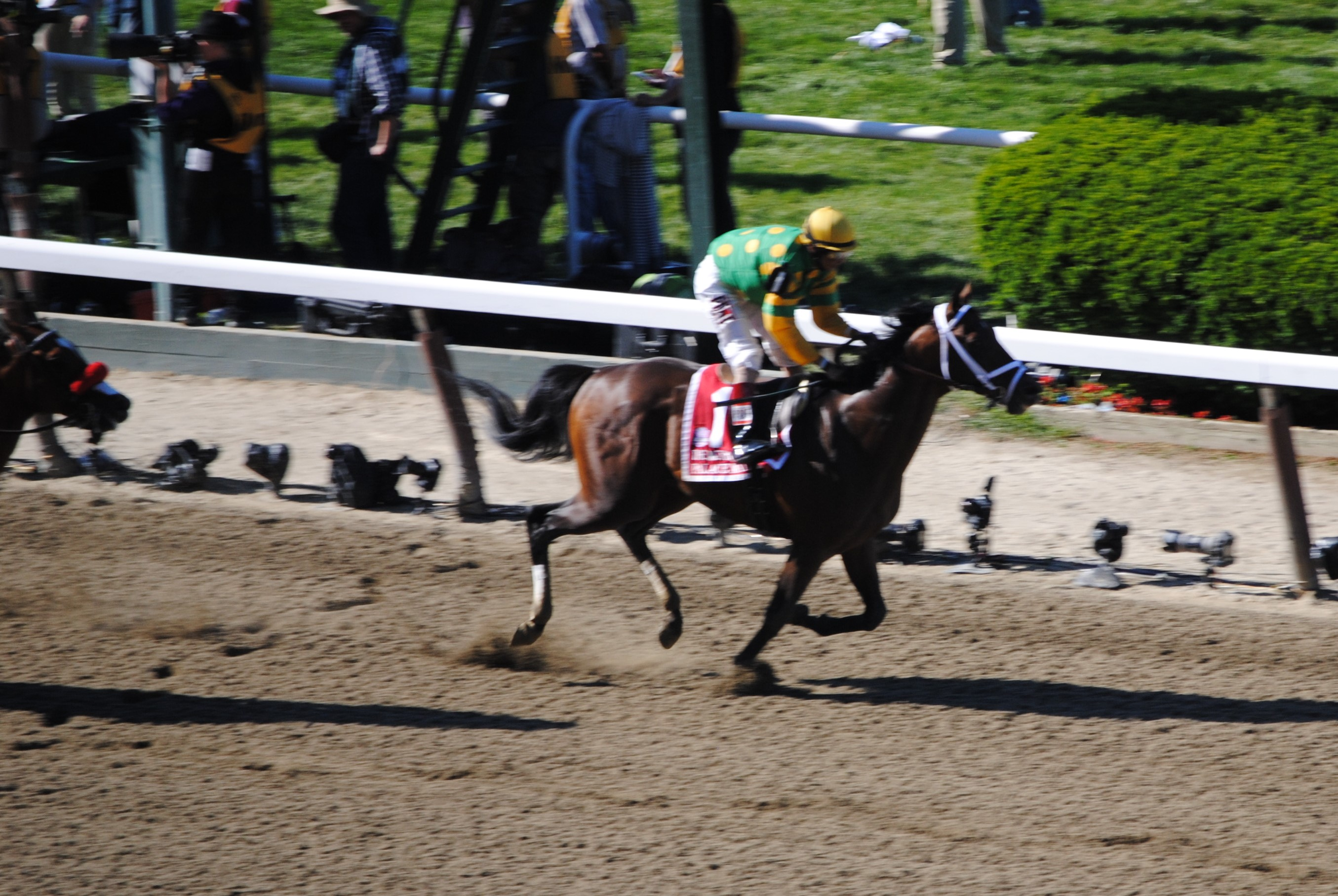
- Palace Malice winning the 2014 Metropolitan Handicap
- Sire: Curlin
- Grandsire: Smart Strike
- Dam: Palace Rumour
- Damsire: Royal Anthem
- Sex: Stallion
- Foaled: May 2, 2010
- Country: United States
- Color: Bay
- Breeder: William S. Farish III
- Owner: Dogwood Stable
- Trainer: Todd Pletcher
- Record: 17: 7-4-1
- Earnings: $2,686,135

Major wins
- Belmont Stakes (2013); Jim Dandy Stakes (2013); Gulfstream Park Handicap (2014); New Orleans Handicap (2014); Westchester Stakes (2014); Metropolitan Handicap (2014)

Palace Malice (born May 2, 2010) is an American Thoroughbred racehorse best known for winning the 2013 Belmont Stakes. After winning one minor race as a two-year-old he made steady improvement in the early part of 2013, being placed in the Risen Star Stakes and Blue Grass Stakes and running prominently in the Kentucky Derby before winning the Belmont Stakes, and the 2014 Metropolitan Handicap. He went on to win the Jim Dandy Stakes and finish second against older horses in the Jockey Club Gold Cup. As a four-year-old in 2014 he won his first four races including the Gulfstream Park Handicap, New Orleans Handicap and Metropolitan Handicap. After two races in 2015, he was retired as a five-year-old and sent to stand at stud at Three Chimneys Farm.

== Background ==
Palace Malice is a dark bay horse with a small white star and is 16 hands high, bred in Kentucky by W.S. Farish. He is from the first crop of foals sired by the 2007 Preakness Stakes and Breeders' Cup Classic winner Curlin. His dam, Palace Rumor, won the 2006 Audubon Oaks and is a half-sister to Maya's Storm and Jumpifyoudare. Palace Malice was her first stakes winner, but after being exported to Japan she produced the Tenno Sho winner Justin Palace. As a descendant of the broodmare Saracen Flirt, she was a distant relative of the St Leger Stakes winner Mutafaweq.

In September 2011, Palace Malice was consigned to the Keeneland Sale and was bought for $25,000 by the bloodstock agent Colin Brennan. In April 2012, the colt returned to Keeneland and was sold for a significant profit, being bought for $200,000 by Dogwood Stable. He was sent into training with the four-time Eclipse Award winner Todd Pletcher.

== Racing career ==
=== 2012: two-year-old season ===
Palace Malice made his racecourse debut in a maiden race over five furlongs at Belmont Park on July 5, 2012, in which he was ridden by Javier Castellano and finished second, beaten half a length by Carried Interest. A month later at Saratoga Race Course, he started favorite for a maiden over 6 1/2 furlongs. After causing some trouble at the start, he recorded his first success, taking the lead at halfway and winning by 3 1/2 lengths from seven opponents. He was the first of Curlin's offspring in the United States to win a race.

=== 2013: three-year-old season ===
Palace Malice began his three-year-old season at Fair Grounds Race Course in New Orleans. In the Risen Star Stakes on February 23, 2013, he finished a nose in front of Oxbow when taking third place behind Ive Struck A Nerve and Code West. At the same course five weeks later, he started second favorite for the Louisiana Derby and finished seventh of the 14 runners behind Revolutionary. On April 13, Palace Malice contested the Blue Grass Stakes on the polytrack surface at Keeneland. He tracked the leaders before taking the lead 120 yards from the finish but was caught in the last strides and beaten a neck by Java's War.

Palace Malice was one of 19 colts to contest the 139th Kentucky Derby at Churchill Downs in which he was ridden by the 47-year-old veteran Mike E. Smith and started at odds of 23.7/1. He took the lead from the start and set a very fast pace, the second fastest initial quarter- and half-miles in Derby history, a pace described as "suicidal", and attributed to the decision to put blinkers on him for the first time. He was overtaken in the straight and dropped back through the field to finish 12th behind winner Orb. On June 8, 2013, Palace Malice, ridden again by Smith, started at odds of 13.8/1 for the Belmont Stakes. Smith tracked across from a wide draw to position the colt just behind the leaders as Frac Daddy set a fast early pace. Oxbow went to the front at halfway, but the Preakness winner was overtaken by Palace Malice on the turn into the straight. Palace Malice drew clear in the last quarter mile to win by 3 1/4 lengths from Oxbow, with Orb in third.

Palace Malice prepped for the Travers Stakes with a run in the Jim Dandy Stakes at Saratoga Race Course on July 27. Starting the 27/20 favorite, he took the lead in the straight and won by a length from Will Take Charge. A month later, Palace Malice faced Will Take Charge in the Travers Stakes, which also attracted Orb and Haskell Invitational Stakes winner Verrazano. Palace Malice started very poorly and was unable to get into contention until the straight, when he finished strongly to finish fourth, beaten a nose, three quarters of a length, and a nose again by Will Take Charge, Moreno, and Orb. Smith said: "He broke really, really, really bad. What am I going to do? I cannot go for the lead. All I could do is sit back there, creep up, creep up, creep up, and see if I could get him there. I thought I still had it for a little bit there, but it was just too much to make up."

On 28 September, Palace Malice was matched against older horses in the Jockey Club Gold Cup at Belmont. Smith tracked the leader, Alpha, and was three wide most of the way before making his challenge in the straight. Palace Malice stayed on well in the closing stages, finishing second to winner Ron The Greek. His connections noted that his wide path meant that he traveled 67 feet (20 m) – over seven lengths – more than the winner and stated that he would run next in the Breeders' Cup Classic. In the Classic on November 2, Palace Malice started fourth choice in the betting but was never in serious contention and finished sixth of the eleven runners behind Mucho Macho Man.

=== 2014: four-year-old season ===
Palace Malice began his third season in the Grade II Gulfstream Park Handicap over a mile on March 9 and was made favorite despite carrying top weight of 119 pounds. Having taken a slight lead on the final turn, he rallied after being headed in the straight and won by a head from the five-year-old Golden Ticket. Pletcher described the performance as "a huge effort off the layoff". Mike Smith rode the colt when he was asked to carry top weight of 121 pounds in the Grade II New Orleans Handicap at Fair Grounds Race Course three weeks later. Despite being forced six wide on the turn, he took the lead in the straight and won by almost five lengths from the favored Normandy Invasion. When Palace Malice was dropped to Grade III class for the Westchester Stakes, only three horses opposed him, and he won by almost ten lengths at odds of 1/20.

On 7 June at Belmont, Palace Malice returned to Grade I company for the first time since the Breeders' Cup Classic when he carried top weight of 124 pounds in the Metropolitan Handicap over one mile. Ridden by John Velasquez, he produced a sustained run in the straight to take the lead well inside the final furlong and won by a length from the Breeders' Cup Dirt Mile winner, Goldencents. The Blood-Horse described Palace Malice's performance as "brilliant" while Pletcher said that the colt's victory was "an unbelievable achievement". The Racing Post rated Palace Malice's performance as the best achieved on dirt by any horse in the world up to that time in 2014. On August 2, the colt started the 13/20 favourite for the Whitney Handicap at Saratoga in which he carried 124 pounds (equal highweight with Will Take Charge). He raced just behind the leaders but began to struggle approaching the straight and faded to finish sixth of the nine runners behind wire-to-wire winner Moreno.

On September 5, it was announced that Palace Malice had been retired with bone bruising to his left hind cannon bone. However, shortly thereafter, Three Chimneys Farm purchased a 50% share in the horse and it was announced that while he would take several months off to heal, and upon reassessment of his condition in November, 2014, he possibly could race again in 2015 in the colors of Dogwood Stables but thereafter would stand at stud at Three Chimneys, which would then have full ownership of the horse.

He returned to the track in 2015, but after two races where he placed third in May and fourth in August, he was retired for good and sent to stand at stud at Three Chimneys. Pletcher said, "Palace Malice was all class from day one...He was the most versatile horse I have ever trained and one of the best."

== Stud career ==
After retirement, Palace Malice initially stood as a stallion at Three Chimneys Stud in Kentucky for a service fee of $25,000. In 2024, he was bought by Darley Japan to stand in Hidaka, Hokkaido in Japan. His service free is currently priced at 3.5 million yen.

=== Notable progeny ===
Palace Malice has currently sired two Grade 1 winners:

c = colt, f = filly, g = gelding

Foaled	Name	Sex	Major wins
2017	Structor	c	Breeders' Cup Juvenile Turf
2021	Jantar Mantar	c	Asahi Hai Futurity Stakes, NHK Mile Cup, Yasuda Kinen, Mile Championship

== Pedigree ==
Pedigree of Palace Malice (USA), bay, 2010
Sire Curlin (USA) 2004	Smart Strike (CAN); 1992	Mr. Prospector	Raise a Native
Sire Curlin (USA) 2004	Smart Strike (CAN); 1992	Mr. Prospector	Gold Digger
Sire Curlin (USA) 2004	Smart Strike (CAN); 1992	Classy 'n Smart	Smarten
Sire Curlin (USA) 2004	Smart Strike (CAN); 1992	Classy 'n Smart	No Class
Sire Curlin (USA) 2004	Sheriff's Deputy (USA); 1994	Deputy Minister	Vice Regent
Sire Curlin (USA) 2004	Sheriff's Deputy (USA); 1994	Deputy Minister	Mint Copy
Sire Curlin (USA) 2004	Sheriff's Deputy (USA); 1994	Barbarika	Bates Motel
Sire Curlin (USA) 2004	Sheriff's Deputy (USA); 1994	Barbarika	War Exchange
Dam Palace Rumor (USA) 2003	Royal Anthem (USA); 1995	Theatrical	Nureyev
Dam Palace Rumor (USA) 2003	Royal Anthem (USA); 1995	Theatrical	Tree of Knowledge
Dam Palace Rumor (USA) 2003	Royal Anthem (USA); 1995	In Neon	Ack Ack
Dam Palace Rumor (USA) 2003	Royal Anthem (USA); 1995	In Neon	Shamara
Dam Palace Rumor (USA) 2003	Whisperifyoudare (USA); 1997	Red Ransom	Roberto
Dam Palace Rumor (USA) 2003	Whisperifyoudare (USA); 1997	Red Ransom	Arabia
Dam Palace Rumor (USA) 2003	Whisperifyoudare (USA); 1997	Stellar Affair	Skywalker
Dam Palace Rumor (USA) 2003	Whisperifyoudare (USA); 1997	Stellar Affair	Fawn and Hahn (Family: 2-s)
