= Brad M. Kelley =

American businessman

- Born: 1956 (age 68–69); Bowling Green, Kentucky, US
- Occupation: Businessperson
- Known for: Ninth-largest U.S. landholder
- Spouse: Susan
- Children: 3

Brad Maurice Kelley (born 1956) is an American businessman who is the 9th largest landowner in the U.S., with an estimated net worth of $1.4 billion in 2025. He founded the Commonwealth Brands tobacco company in 1991 and sold the company in 2001 to Houchens Industries for US$1 billion. As of 2014, Kelley's business interests include Calumet Farm, NC2 Media and the Center for Innovation and Technology business park.

== Biography ==
=== Early life ===
Kelley was born in Bowling Green, Kentucky. He was raised in Simpson County, Kentucky, and went to Franklin-Simpson High School in Franklin, Kentucky, where he was a secretary for the Future Farmers of America and was named Kentucky high school conservationist of the year. He bought his first piece of land, a farm near his childhood home, at age 17, and his first warehouse at age 20. He attended Western Kentucky University for a short period but left before the completion of his studies to pursue business interests.

=== Career ===
Kelley grew up on a farm that included tobacco, and his early business ventures were a response to changes in the tobacco industry. Because of declining production in the 1980s, many old warehouses in Kentucky stood vacant. He started buying these warehouses, converting them to other uses, and then leasing them out. This interest evolved into manufacturing. In 1991, he founded Commonwealth Brands, a tobacco company that manufactured low-cost cigarettes, headquartered in Bowling Green, Kentucky. The company was later sold in 2001 to Houchens Industries for US$1 billion. Kelley has never smoked, and he said in 2012, "I've never defended [smoking]. Hopefully it will be phased out of society."

In May 2012, Kelley became the operator of the historic Calumet Farm in Lexington. He was already involved in Thoroughbred breeding and racing operations. He was formerly the largest shareholder and a board member of Churchill Downs. In May 2013, his colt Oxbow won the Preakness Stakes.

According to the Land Report's 2022 ranking of the top 100 land holders in the U.S., Kelley owns 1 million acres of American ranching land in Texas, Florida and New Mexico, which ranks him as America's ninth-largest private land owner. His landholdings have decreased after he sold several Texas ranches, including 49,723 acres in San Jacinto and 10,000 acres near Alpine.

Kelley is one of the biggest landowners in the United States, owning more than a million acres. In 2013, the former tobacco businessman expanded his interests to Hawaii by purchasing 2,750 acres from Grove Farm owned by Steve Case; he currently leases a portion of them to American Tower, a cell phone tower operator.

In March 2013, the commercial arm of the BBC, BBC Worldwide, announced the sale of Lonely Planet to Kelly's NC2 Media. Lonely Planet is a guidebook publisher that has printed over 100 million guidebooks, in addition to magazines, digital content, and other travel services.

In January 2020, Kelley put up for sale many of his West Texas ranches, offering roughly 500,000 acres with a listing price of $404 million.

In December 2020, NC2 Media sold Lonely Planet to Red Ventures for an undisclosed amount.

== Personal life ==
Kelley is married with three children. He rarely gives interviews and does not use email. Kelley is active in the conservation movement. He supports many environmental and wildlife conservation interests, including Punta Gorda, Florida's Center for Conservation of Tropical Ungulates. The center supports many animal species, including rhinoceros, tapir, wild cattle, and antelope.
