= Oxbow (horse) =

American-bred Thoroughbred racehorse

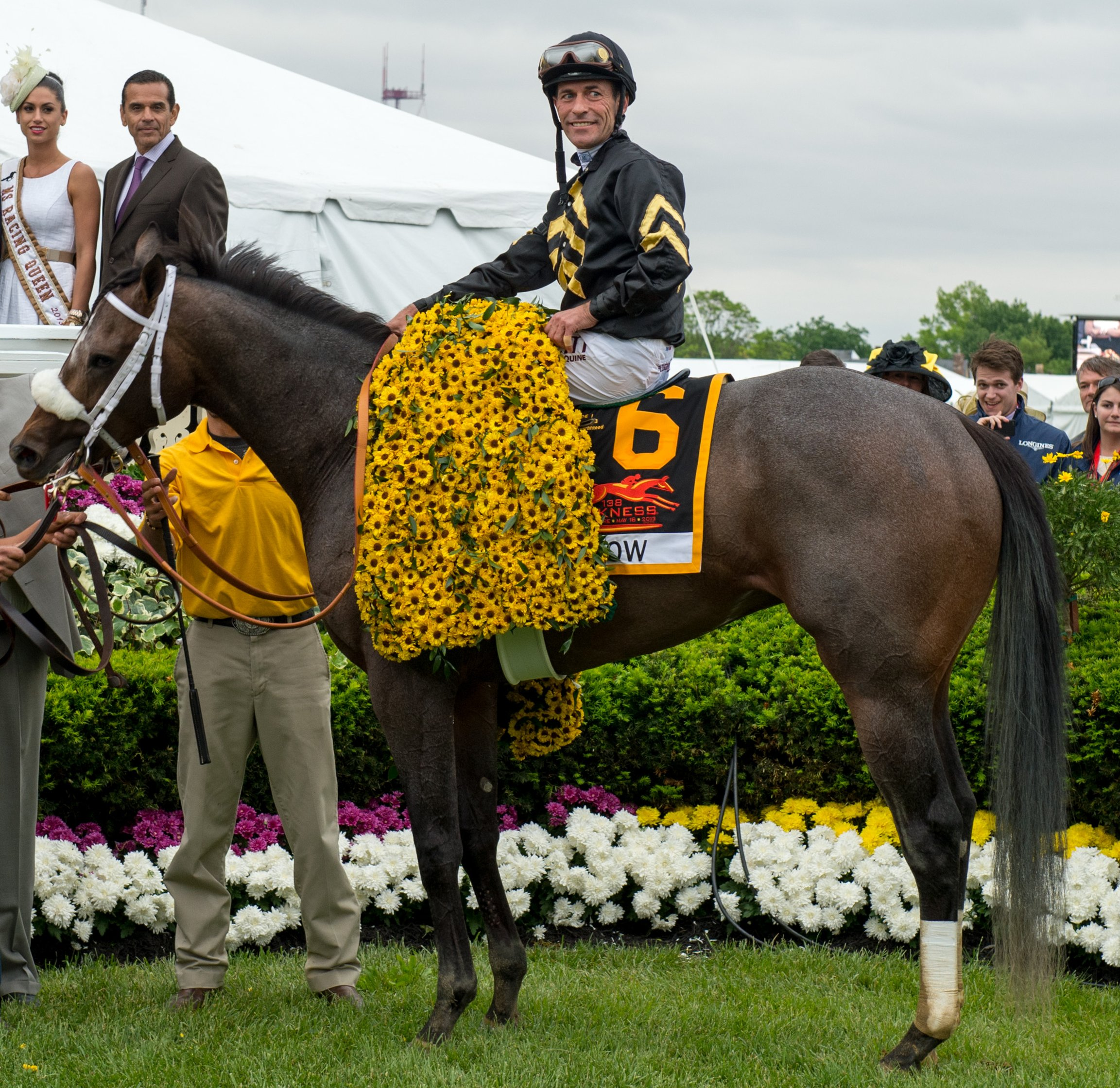
- Oxbow in the winner's circle at the 2013 Preakness Stakes
- Sire: Awesome Again
- Grandsire: Deputy Minister
- Dam: Tizamazing
- Damsire: Cee's Tizzy
- Sex: Stallion
- Foaled: March 26, 2010
- Country: United States
- Colour: Dark Bay
- Breeder: Colts Neck Stables
- Owner: Bluegrass Hall; Calumet Farm
- Trainer: D. Wayne Lukas
- Record: 13:3-2-1
- Earnings: $1,243,500

Major wins
- Lecomte Stakes (2013); Triple Crown classic race wins: Preakness Stakes (2013)

Oxbow (foaled March 26, 2010), an American Thoroughbred racehorse, is best known for winning the second jewel in the United States Triple Crown of Thoroughbred Racing, the 2013 Preakness Stakes. A dark bay stallion, sired by a winner of the Breeders' Cup Classic and out of a full sister to another Breeders' Cup Classic winner, Oxbow was sold as a yearling at Keeneland for $250,000 and is owned by Brad Kelley of Calumet Farm. He was trained by D. Wayne Lukas and was ridden in his Triple Crown races by Gary Stevens.

Oxbow had a reputation as a front-runner who was difficult to rate during his races. Plagued with frequent turnover in jockeys prior to the Triple Crown series, and often running from poor starting gate post positions, he had only two wins prior to his victory in the Preakness. That success was Calumet Farm's first win in a Triple Crown race in 45 years and breeder Richard Santulli's first win in a Triple Crown classic race. It also was Stevens' first Triple Crown win since 2001, following his return to riding in early 2013 after a seven-year retirement, and Lukas' first Triple Crown win since 2000.

Oxbow's second-place finish in the Belmont Stakes in June made him the third horse that year to reach $1 million in purse wins. Following the Belmont, he was ranked the top three-year-old racehorse in the United States by the National Thoroughbred Racing Association (NTRA). He was pulled up shortly after finishing fourth in the Haskell Invitational, and was found to have suffered a soft tissue injury, was taken out of competition for the remainder of his three-year-old season, and retired in October 2013. He stands at stud for the 2015 breeding season at Calumet Farms.

== Background ==
Oxbow is a dark bay horse, marked with an irregularly shaped white star on his forehead and white on his lower lip. He is 16 hands (64 inches, 163 cm) tall. Oxbow was bred by Richard Santulli's New Jersey–based Colts Neck Stables, and foaled in Kentucky at Burleson Farms. His sire is 1998 Breeders' Cup Classic winner Awesome Again, and his dam is Tizamazing, an unraced full sister to the two-time Breeders' Cup Classic winner Tiznow. Oxbow's win in the Preakness Stakes was the first win in a Triple Crown classic race for Santulli's breeding program.

As a yearling, Oxbow was sent to the Keeneland sales, where he was purchased for $250,000 by bloodstock agent Eddie Kane, acting on behalf of Brad M. Kelley's Bluegrass Hall. In 2012, the Calumet Investment Group bought Calumet Farm and leased it to Kelley, (Note: Kelley is a member of the Calumet Investment Group.) who moved his Bluegrass Hall racing operation and 200 horses from his Hurricane Hill farm to the historic Calumet property in early 2013. (Note: Although Kelley's horses race under the name of Calumet Farm, they carry Kelley's black and gold colors, as the original red and blue silks of Calumet were sold in 1992.) Prior to 2013, Calumet Farm had not had a winning horse in a Triple Crown race since 1968.

Although officially registered with The Jockey Club as a bay, Oxbow has white hairs scattered throughout his coat, therefore his trainer, D. Wayne Lukas, describes him as a roan. Oxbow was listed as "gray/roan" when he was sold as a yearling at Keeneland. (Note: Oxbow's pedigree does not suggest that he could be a roan. Both Awesome Again and Tizamazing are bay or brown horses. Roan is a dominant gene, thus a roan horse must have one roan parent. His coloration could indicate sabino genetics, as the white chin spot and white flecks in his coat are consistent with the minimal expression of that pattern.)

== Early racing career ==
=== 2012: Two-year-old season ===
"When we bought him as a yearling, he was so athletic that it looked like you could put a saddle on him and run him. He was one tough son of a gun and as durable as they make them."

— D. Wayne Lukas

Oxbow's racing career began on August 3, 2012, at Saratoga Race Course in an $80,000 maiden race at 5.5 furlongs (0.7 mi; 1.1 km) under jockey Junior Alvarado. Listed at odds of 22–1, he was slow out of the gate and in sixth early on. He took an awkward step going into the turn, and as a result, his jockey pulled him up and he was taken off the track in a horse ambulance. In October, Oxbow was given another chance in a $50,000 maiden race at 7 furlongs (0.9 mi; 1.4 km) at Keeneland Race Course. At 11–1 under jockey Jon Court, he broke sharply and led the field at the quarter-mile post. At the top of the homestretch he was caught by Winning Cause, and ultimately finished fourth with a speed figure of 73. On October 31, he ran in another $50,000 maiden race at seven furlongs at Lukas' home track, Churchill Downs. At 17–1 under jockey Terry Thompson, Oxbow came out of the gate ninth, but as in his previous race, had the lead by the quarter-mile post. He ultimately placed third, with an improved speed figure of 85.

Oxbow's first win was a month later on the undercard of the Clark Handicap, in another $50,000 maiden race at Churchill Downs. He went off as the 2–1 favorite in a race of 7 furlongs (0.9 mi; 1.4 km) with jockey Joe Rocco. He started from the far outside at the tenth post position and broke from the gate in seventh but jumped out to the lead within a few strides and led going into the turn by a half length. Oxbow increased his lead throughout the race and won by almost five lengths, earning a 90 speed figure.

After Oxbow's maiden win, he was flown to Hollywood Park in California to run in the Grade I CashCall Futurity at a mile and one-sixteenth (1,700 m) on a synthetic surface. He was the longest shot in the field at 61–1, and drew the far outside post at number eleven. Ridden by Corey Nakatani, his fifth jockey in five races, Oxbow broke well coming out the gate. He ran close to the front throughout the race, despite losing ground by being four horses wide around the first turn and three wide around the final turn. Oxbow finished fourth, nine lengths back, but earned his first Road to the Kentucky Derby point, and a speed figure of 87.

=== 2013: Three-year-old season ===
Oxbow was moved with the rest of Lukas' horses to winter headquarters at Oaklawn Park in Hot Springs, Arkansas. He started his Triple Crown prep season on January 19, 2013, with a win at the Fair Grounds Race Course in New Orleans in the mile and 70-yard (1,672 m) Grade III Lecomte Stakes. Ridden for the second time by Jon Court, he went off as the fourth choice at 5–1 and had a favorable number four post position. He came out of the gate quickly and was the front-runner throughout the race. At the top of the homestretch, he was only a half length in front of the field, but then he drew away and won by more than eleven and a half lengths. Horses he beat that day included Golden Soul, who later placed second in the Kentucky Derby, and I've Struck a Nerve, who Oxbow faced again later in the Risen Star Stakes. He earned a speed figure of 94 and an additional ten points towards qualification for the Derby. That month, Lukas also contacted veteran Hall of Fame jockey Gary Stevens, who had just returned to racing after a seven-year retirement, and discussed having Stevens ride Oxbow in future races.

"He's not an easy horse to train at all, but the good ones do that sometimes."

— D. Wayne Lukas

Five weeks later, Oxbow was entered in the Grade II mile and one-sixteenth (1,700 m) Risen Star Stakes. Ridden for the third time by Jon Court, Oxbow was assigned the far outside post at number ten, and was the second favorite at 4–1. He broke fifth from the gate, moved to third passing the stands, but lost ground by being five horses wide around the first turn. In the stretch, Oxbow took the lead but could not hold it and finished fourth, although he and the three top-placed horses all ended the race within a length and a half of each other in a blanket finish. The winner was I've Struck a Nerve, at odds of 135–1. Oxbow again progressed in performance, earning a speed figure of 98 and five more points toward Derby qualification.

Three weeks later, Lukas entered Oxbow in Oaklawn Park's key preparatory race for the Arkansas Derby, the Grade II Rebel Stakes. For the fourth time in five races, Oxbow started on the far outside at post ten. He went off as the favorite for the second time in his career, at 4–1. Lukas switched Jon Court to ride stablemate Will Take Charge, and Oxbow was given yet another jockey, Mike Smith. Oxbow was third out of the gate. He took the lead down the backstretch and stayed in front until the end of the race where he was narrowly defeated by Will Take Charge. Oxbow lost by half a head, but earned his first triple-digit speed figure at 101, along with 20 Derby qualification points. After the Rebel Stakes, Oxbow was ranked as one of the top ten horses in some Triple Crown pre-race polls, and secured eligibility to run in the Derby with 36 points.

Four weeks after the Rebel, Oxbow entered his last preparatory race before the Triple Crown campaign, the Grade I Arkansas Derby, held on April 13. This race marked the first time Oxbow was ridden by 50-year-old Stevens, who was Oxbow's seventh jockey in nine races. The horse was the favorite at 3–1, but once again drew an unfavorable, far-outside post at ten. Oxbow came out ninth at the break and was almost seven lengths behind the leader at the start. He had developed a reputation for running in front and wearing out his exercise riders, so Stevens unsuccessfully attempted to rate Oxbow and make him run off the pace, behind other horses. Oxbow, described by observers as "very rank", and by Stevens as "pissed off ... [and] upset with me that he didn't get the running style he wanted", was tossing his head and fighting Stevens into the clubhouse turn. After running last at one point in the race, Oxbow improved his position and finished fifth, less than a length behind second-place Frac Daddy. Oxbow earned a speed figure of 90, the same as in his maiden win. Stevens viewed his attempt to make Oxbow run off the pace as a mistake. "It just turned out to be a nightmare trip and I take full (responsibility) for that", he said. Lukas agreed, stating, "That will not be in [Stevens'] grandchildren's highlight film".

== Triple Crown Series ==
=== Kentucky Derby ===
Oxbow ran in the Kentucky Derby at Churchill Downs as a 25–1 long shot, ridden by Stevens, who had been on Oxbow in workouts since the Arkansas Derby, and as Lukas said, had "gotten to know the horse a little better throughout the last two weeks". Following the scratch of Black Onyx in post position one, Oxbow had the inside number two post in the field of 19 starters and was closest to the rail. His position was further complicated by being next to Revolutionary with jockey Calvin Borel at number three. Between the size of the field and Borel's well-known preference for riding the rail, Oxbow had to use his speed early to get out front and avoid being pushed into the rail or being hemmed in behind traffic. He broke fifth and was soon close to leader Palace Malice, who ran the second fastest initial quarter- and half-miles in Derby history, a pace described as "suicidal". Oxbow maintained his position near the front, and at the top of the homestretch passed the tired-out speed horses to lead the race for a sixteenth of a mile. He then faded and finished in sixth place, six lengths behind winner Orb, though his performance was still viewed as "respectable" and "promising". Oxbow earned a speed figure of 101, the same as he had in the Rebel, and observers noted that he was the only horse that ran near the front of the pack in the opening half-mile to also finish in the top six; none of the other horses out front early finished better than twelfth.

=== Preakness Stakes ===
"I came into the stretch so loaded. I couldn't believe that no one challenged me ... but when no one did, I said, 'I think everybody's in trouble right now.'"

— Gary Stevens

Oxbow next went to Pimlico Race Course in Baltimore to run in the 2013 Preakness Stakes. In the week prior to the race, he had another workout with Stevens, who stated that it was the "first time [Oxbow] had listened to me", later amending his comments to say, "maybe it's the first time I've listened to him."

Oxbow drew a favorable spot in the gate at post position six, his first good draw since his win in the Lecomte, and kept the same rider for three straight races for the first time in his career. At the start of the race, Will Take Charge veered in and brushed Oxbow, who broke third but took the lead within a few strides and soon led by one and a half lengths. Once in front, Stevens got Oxbow to relax, and they ran the first quarter-mile in 0:23.94, the half mile in 0:48.60, and three-quarters at 1:13:26. Despite the modest pace, what one sportswriter called "lullaby fractions", described by Stevens as "just walking the dog", the colt was one and a half lengths in front at the three-quarter-mile mark.

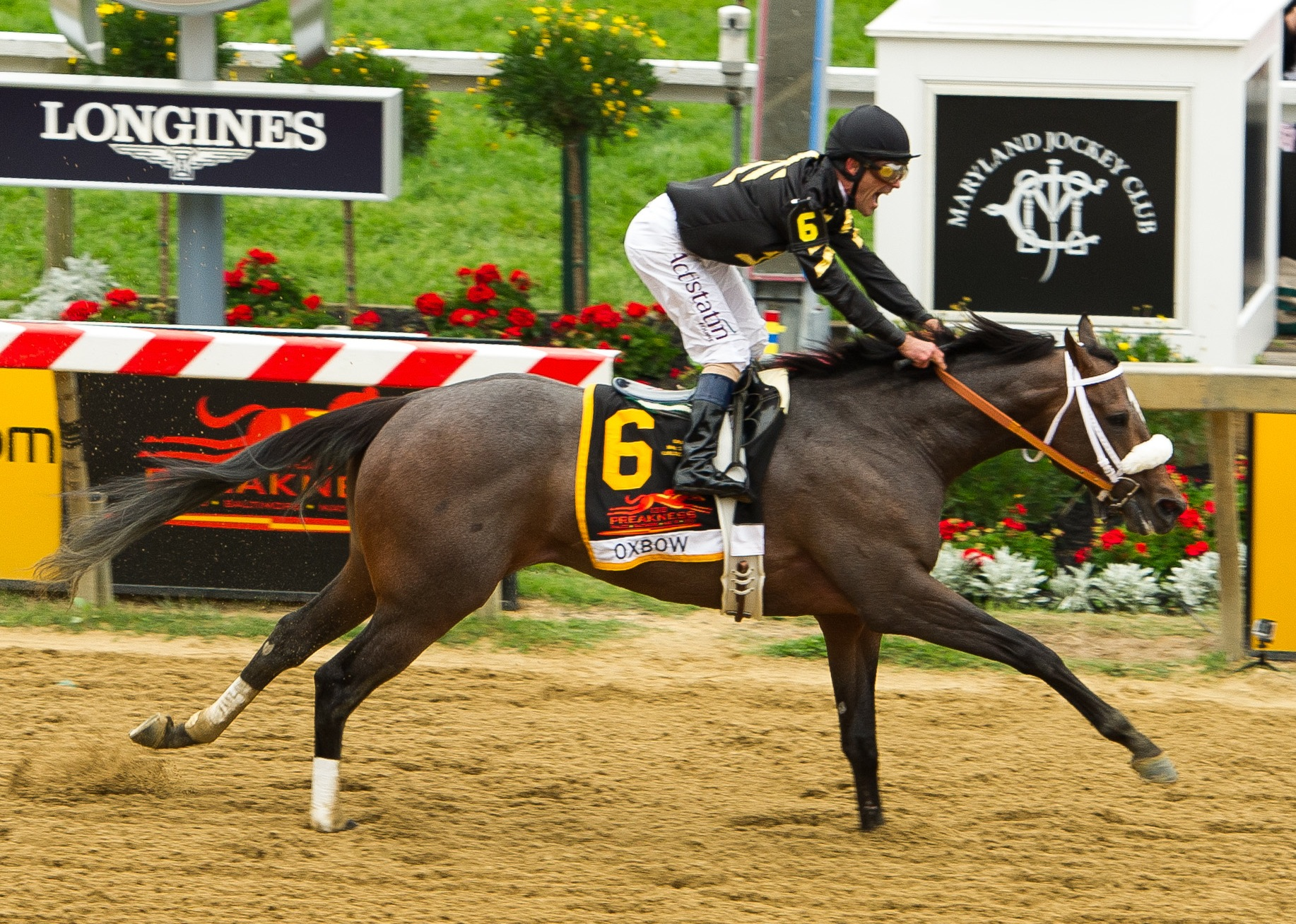
Oxbow winning the 2013 Preakness Stakes

Although Steven said the horse "rated himself", sportswriters speculated that once in front, the experienced Stevens had slowed the pace, leaving Oxbow with enough reserves for the final push. Turning for home, Oxbow "exploded off the turn" and led by three lengths. Never seriously challenged, he recorded a 15–1 upset victory by one and three quarter lengths in front of runner-up Itsmyluckyday. Mylute finished third and Derby champion Orb was fourth. Oxbow earned a career-high speed figure of 112, which was higher than Orb's had been in the Derby. In post-race interviews, Stevens said, "His mind was right", "when I hit the half-mile pole ... The race was over at that point", and "[t]hey gave me a free three-quarters of a mile today." Stevens later tweeted that Oxbow was the "most intelligent horse I have ever ridden". He noted the horse was not particularly tired after the race and described him as a "happy horse" in the winner's circle. Lukas said, "He never even broke a sweat." The victory was 77-year-old Lukas' sixth career Preakness win and his 14th Triple Crown win, surpassing the record of "Sunny Jim" Fitzsimmons. It was Lukas' first win in any Triple Crown race since Commendable won the Belmont Stakes in 2000. Oxbow's success was Stevens' third career Preakness win and his ninth Triple Crown win, but the first since winning the Preakness and Belmont on Point Given in 2001.

=== Belmont Stakes ===
Fourteen horses started at the 2013 Belmont Stakes. Oxbow drew the number seven post position, with rival Orb at post five. There were concerns about Stevens' fitness as he had missed races after being thrown from a horse the previous week, but medical tests showed no sign of injury. Oxbow was the third favorite at 5–1 on the morning line, but by race time his odds were at 10–1.

In the race Oxbow broke third out of the gate and settled behind pacesetters Frac Daddy and Freedom Child, completing a quarter mile in 23 seconds. As usual, Oxbow wanted to run close to the front, Stevens knew better than to fight with him, and so, as in the Derby, horse and rider once again chased the speed horses at fractions described as "suicidal". At the half-mile pole Oxbow was a neck off the leader, who clocked at 0:46.66, and on the backstretch, Oxbow went to the front, reaching the three-quarter mile mark at 1:10.95, running the second fastest half- and three-quarter mile fractions at that point in the race since Secretariat's 1973 record-setting performance. Oxbow was still in front by a half length at the mile post. At the top of the homestretch, Palace Malice and Oxbow were nose and nose but Oxbow tired, and finished second by three lengths to Palace Malice with Kentucky Derby winner Orb third, 1 3/4 lengths behind Oxbow. His speed figure for the Belmont was 98, the same as in the Risen Star Stakes.

"I'm so proud of this colt. I thought I was dead midway down the backside ... he never got any break ....To finish second, I am really surprised."

— Gary Stevens

The second-place finish in the Belmont earned Oxbow $200,000 and pushed him over the $1 million mark in career earnings, making him the third horse in 2013 to reach $1 million in purse wins, behind Orb and a fellow Awesome Again son, the six-year-old gelding Game On Dude. Although the $1 million bonus for the horse winning the highest combined Triple Crown points has long been discontinued, Oxbow would have won it over Orb owing to his win in the Preakness and second in the Belmont. Further, his placing in the Belmont put him at number one in the post-Belmont June 10 NTRA poll of top three-year-olds, and in the top ten for race horses of all ages.

== Remainder of season ==
Oxbow came out of the Belmont feeling good, or as Lukas put it, "full of himself." He returned to Churchill Downs, and resumed scheduled workouts sooner than usual. Lukas then shipped Oxbow to Saratoga to prepare him to run in the Grade I, $1 million Haskell Invitational on July 28, 2013, with sportswriters hoping to see him meet up again with Orb and Palace Malice in the Travers Stakes later in the summer. In an attempt to get Oxbow past what had been described as his "one-dimensional" front-running style, Lukas turned to a training regimen at Saratoga where the horse had no clocked workouts, but instead was conditioned by jogging and galloping clockwise (the "wrong way") on the training track for long one-and-a-half to two-mile trips each time out.

Oxbow drew post position five for the Haskell, carried the highest weight at 122 pounds, and was the second favorite in the race behind Verrazano. Leading for the early part of the race, Oxbow was challenged for the lead by Verrazano at the three-quarter-mile marker, then weakened and finished fourth, earning another $60,000. Stevens felt something was wrong with Oxbow at the half-mile pole, later saying the horse "didn’t feel like he did in any of the Triple Crown races", and Lukas stated the jockey "kind of held" Oxbow from that point on. Oxbow was pulled up soon after crossing the finish line, then his rider jumped off and removed the saddle when Oxbow failed to jog sound on the track. The horse walked back to the barn without obvious sign of injury, and radiographs of his right front ankle revealed no fracture, but he did have a soft tissue injury to the area, described as a "sprain". Of Oxbow's overall health, Lukas commented, "he had a pretty set of X-rays. It's amazing. For a horse with that many [starts], they were really clean." Nonetheless, as a result of the soft tissue injury, Oxbow was taken out of races for the duration of the summer, and after three weeks of hand-walking at Saratoga was shipped home to Calumet in mid-August, with an announcement that he was not anticipated to run again in 2013. Lukas said: "He's been a warrior and a hell of a nice horse for us and I don't want to do anything to jeopardize his future down the line." On October 25, 2013, Calumet Farm announced the decision to retire Oxbow. Combined with his winnings in his two-year-old season, his lifetime race earnings were $1,243,500. He stood at stud for the 2014 breeding season at Taylor Made Farm in Lexington, Kentucky, for an introductory stud fee of $20,000. He closed out the year ranked 17th in earnings with $1,146,000 won in 2013. For the 2015 season he moves to Calumet Farms, where he joins seven other stallions, including English Channel, who sired 2014 Travers Stakes winner V.E. Day.

== Breeding career ==
After standing at stud in 2014 at Taylor Made Farm, Oxbow was moved to Calumet Farm, where he stands as of 2020.

Oxbow's first winner was the filly Delaphene, out of the Empire Maker mare Boustierre who won a maiden race at Arlington Park on July 16, 2017. Oxbow's first graded stakes winner was Coach Rocks, winner of the 2018 Gulfstream Park Oaks.

Hot Rod Charlie is Oxbow's leading performer to date, winning the Louisiana Derby, hitting the board in the Kentucky Derby, running second in the Belmont Stakes, and winning the Pennsylvania Derby.

== Racing statistics ==
Date	Age	Distance	Race	Grade	Track	Surface	Odds	Time	Field	Finish	Margin	Jockey	Trainer	Owner	Citation
August 3, 2012	2	5.5 furlongs (11/16 mile or 1,100 m)	Maiden Special Weight	Maiden	Saratoga	Dirt	22.40	N/A	7	Did not finish	N/A	Junior Alvarado	D. Wayne Lukas	Bluegrass Hall LLC	
October 18, 2012	2	7 furlongs (7/8 mile or 1,400 m)	Maiden Special Weight	Maiden	Keeneland	Dirt	11.50	N/A	9	4	N/A	Jon Court	D. Wayne Lukas	Bluegrass Hall LLC	
October 31, 2012	2	7 furlongs (7/8 mile or 1,400 m)	Maiden Special Weight	Maiden	Churchill Downs	Dirt	16.80	N/A	11	3	N/A	Terry J. Thompson	D. Wayne Lukas	Bluegrass Hall LLC	
November 25, 2012	2	7 furlongs (7/8 mile or 1,400 m)	Maiden Special Weight	Maiden	Churchill Downs	Dirt	1.70	1:22.07	11	1	4.75 lengths	Joseph Rocco Jr.	D. Wayne Lukas	Bluegrass Hall LLC	
December 15, 2012	2	8.5 furlongs (1 1/16 miles or 1,700 m)	CashCall Futurity	1	Hollywood Park	Synthetic	60.80	N/A	11	4	N/A	Corey Nakatani	D. Wayne Lukas	Bluegrass Hall LLC	
January 19, 2013	3	8.318 furlongs (1 39/1000 miles or 1,672 m)	Lecomte Stakes	3	Fair Grounds	Dirt	4.60	1:43.30	9	1	11.5 lengths	Jon Court	D. Wayne Lukas	Bluegrass Hall LLC	
February 23, 2013	3	8.5 furlongs (1 1/16 miles or 1,700 m)	Risen Star Stakes	2	Fair Grounds	Dirt	4.40	N/A	12	4	N/A	Jon Court	D. Wayne Lukas	Calumet Farm	
March 16, 2013	3	8.5 fulongs (1 1/16 miles or 1,700 m)	Rebel Stakes	2	Oaklawn Park	Dirt	3.80	1:45.18	12	2	Head	Mike E. Smith	D. Wayne Lukas	Calumet Farm	
April 13, 2013	3	9 furlongs (1 1/8 miles or 1,800 m)	Arkansas Derby	1	Oaklawn Park	Dirt	3.00	N/A	10	5	N/A	Gary Stevens	D. Wayne Lukas	Calumet Farm	
May 4, 2013	3	10 furlongs (1 1/4 miles or 2,000 m)	Kentucky Derby	1	Churchill Downs	Dirt	24.90	N/A	19	6	N/A	Gary Stevens	D. Wayne Lukas	Calumet Farm	
May 18, 2013	3	9.5 furlongs (1 3/16 miles or 1,900 m)	Preakness Stakes	1	Pimlico Race Course	Dirt	15.40	1:57.54	9	1	1.75 lengths	Gary Stevens	D. Wayne Lukas	Calumet Farm	
June 8, 2013	3	12 furlongs (1 1/2 miles or 2,400 m)	Belmont Stakes	1	Belmont Park	Dirt	10.10	N/A	14	2	N/A	Gary Stevens	D. Wayne Lukas	Calumet Farm	
July 28, 2013	3	9 furlongs (1 1/8 miles or 1,800 m)	Haskell Invitational	1	Monmouth Park	Dirt	3.00	N/A	7	4	N/A	Gary Stevens	D. Wayne Lukas	Calumet Farm	

== Pedigree ==
Oxbow was sired by the Canadian-bred Awesome Again, winner of the 1998 Breeders' Cup Classic. At stud, Awesome Again has sired many stakes winners, including Paynter, who placed second in the 2012 Belmont Stakes and won the 2012 Haskell Invitational; Ghostzapper, who was 2004 American Horse of the Year and a 2004 Breeders' Cup winner; and Game On Dude, two-time winner of the Santa Anita Handicap. Oxbow is almost a full brother to Paynter; the two horses are out of full sisters. Oxbow's older full brother, Awesome Patriot, won the 2011 Alydar Stakes. Oxbow's younger full brother, Expect a Lot, is in race training. Oxbow's dam Tizamazing was bred back to Awesome Again in 2013, and in June 2013 was confirmed to be in foal.

Tizamazing is a full sister to Tiznow, who was 2000 American Horse of the Year and won the Breeders' Cup Classic twice. Tizamazing sold for $1 million at Keeneland as a yearling, but owing to a training injury she never raced. Tizamazing's dam, Cee's Song, is credited with raising the respect breeders have for her female breeding line, Thoroughbred family 26, as one of the top g lines in America. Five full siblings out of Cee's Song were either race winners or the dams of race winners: Tiznow, Tizbud and Tizdubai are all stakes winners, Oxbow's dam Tizamazing and Paynter's dam Tizso both produced stakes winners. Another offspring of Cee's Song, the gelding Budroyale, was second in the 1999 Breeders' Cup Classic. Oxbow's pedigree is outcrossed for four generations, with very little inbreeding. Oxbow is only inbred 4x5x5 to Northern Dancer, meaning that this horse appears once in the fourth and twice in the fifth generation of Oxbow's pedigree.

Pedigree of Oxbow (USA), bay colt 2010
Sire Awesome Again (CAN) 1994	Deputy Minister (CAN); 1979	Vice Regent	Northern Dancer
Sire Awesome Again (CAN) 1994	Deputy Minister (CAN); 1979	Vice Regent	Victoria Regina
Sire Awesome Again (CAN) 1994	Deputy Minister (CAN); 1979	Mint Copy	Bunty's Flight
Sire Awesome Again (CAN) 1994	Deputy Minister (CAN); 1979	Mint Copy	Shakney
Sire Awesome Again (CAN) 1994	Primal Force (USA); 1987	Blushing Groom	Red God
Sire Awesome Again (CAN) 1994	Primal Force (USA); 1987	Blushing Groom	Runaway Bride
Sire Awesome Again (CAN) 1994	Primal Force (USA); 1987	Prime Prospect	Mr. Prospector
Sire Awesome Again (CAN) 1994	Primal Force (USA); 1987	Prime Prospect	Square Generation
Dam Tizamazing (USA) 2002	Cee's Tizzy (USA); 1987	Relaunch	In Reality
Dam Tizamazing (USA) 2002	Cee's Tizzy (USA); 1987	Relaunch	Foggy Note
Dam Tizamazing (USA) 2002	Cee's Tizzy (USA); 1987	Tizly	Lyphard
Dam Tizamazing (USA) 2002	Cee's Tizzy (USA); 1987	Tizly	Tizna
Dam Tizamazing (USA) 2002	Cee's Song (USA); 1986	Seattle Song	Seattle Slew
Dam Tizamazing (USA) 2002	Cee's Song (USA); 1986	Seattle Song	Incantation
Dam Tizamazing (USA) 2002	Cee's Song (USA); 1986	Lonely Dancer	Nice Dancer
Dam Tizamazing (USA) 2002	Cee's Song (USA); 1986	Lonely Dancer	Sleep Lonely (Family 26)
