= Shanghai Bobby =

American-bred Thoroughbred racehorse

- Sire: Harlan's Holiday
- Grandsire: Harlan
- Dam: Steelin'
- Damsire: Orientate
- Sex: Colt
- Foaled: 27 February 2010
- Country: United States
- Colour: Dark Bay or Brown
- Breeder: Stonehaven Steadings
- Owner: Starlight Racing
- Trainer: Todd Pletcher
- Record: 7: 5-1-0
- Earnings: $1,797,000

Major wins
- Hopeful Stakes (2012); Champagne Stakes (2012); Breeders' Cup Juvenile (2012)

Awards
- American Champion Two-Year-Old Colt (2012)

Shanghai Bobby (foaled February 27, 2010) is an American Thoroughbred racehorse. In 2012 he was unbeaten in five races including the Breeders' Cup Juvenile and was awarded American Champion Two-Year-Old Colt at the Eclipse Awards.

== Background ==
Shanghai Bobby is a dark bay or brown colt bred in Kentucky by Stonehaven Steadings. In September he was sent to the Keeneland sales where he was bought for $105,000 by a representative of Starlight Racing. Jack Wold and Donnie Lucarelli, the owners of Starlight Racing, named the horse after their friend Bob Burton, an airline pilot who often flew to Shanghai. He is trained by the five-time Eclipse Award winner Todd Pletcher and has been ridden in all of his races to date by Rosie Napravnik.

== Racing career ==
=== 2012: two-year-old season ===
Shanghai Bobby made his first appearance on April 19 when he won a four and half furlong race at Aqueduct Racetrack. Two months later he ran in the Track Barron Stakes at Belmont Park. Starting the 1/2 favorite, he won by a length from Handsome Jack. Shanghai Bobby's next race was the Grade II Hopeful Stakes at Saratoga Race Course on September 3. He took the lead early in the straight and won by 3 3/4 lengths from the favored Fortify.

In October, Shanghai Bobby was moved up to Grade I class for the Champagne Stakes over one mile at Belmont. Starting the 33/20 favorite, he took the lead a quarter mile from the finish and drew clear to win by five lengths from Goldencents. After the race Pletcher praised the colt's versatility and tenacity, saying that he had "all the tools". For his final start of the year, Shanghai Bobby raced outside New York State for the first time when he was sent to California to contest the Breeders' Cup Juvenile at Santa Anita Park. Starting the 7/4 favorite he raced in second place before taking a clear lead 2 1/2 furlongs from the finish. At the turn into the stretch he appeared to be struggling and was briefly headed, but rallied strongly to win by a head from He's Had Enough. Commenting on the horse's performance, Napravnik, who became only the second woman to ride a Breeders' Cup winner, explained that "Bobby gets lost when he's out there by himself".

=== 2013: three-year-old season ===
Shanghai Bobby's early targets in 2013 were the Jan. 26 Holy Bull Stakes and the March 30 Florida Derby. On Jan. 26 Shanghai Bobby was the 2/1 favorite for the Holy Bull Stakes. He started quickly and led till the straight when he was overtaken by Itsmyluckyday. He finished the race in second behind Itsmyluckyday by six lengths sustaining the first loss of his career. On March 30, 2013, Shanghai Bobby was the 5/2 favorite for the Besilu Stables Florida Derby at Gulfstream Park. He broke sharp and stalked on the inside until the far turn where he weakened to place 5th behind Orb, Itsmyluckyday, Merit Man, and Narvaez. On March 30, Shanghai Bobby was diagnosed with a pelvic stress fracture. He was sent to a farm in Florida to recover. On September 20, Shanghai Bobby made a comeback in his first start after the injury in the Florida Derby, starting in the Aljamin Stakes at Belmont Park, and winning by a half-length. On September 30, it was announced that Shanghai Bobby had sustained an injury to a suspensory ligament and would be retired from racing. He will reside at Coolmoore Stud's American Breeding Branch, Ashford Stud.

== Pedigree ==
Pedigree of Shanghai Bobby (USA), bay, 2010
Sire Harlan's Holiday (USA) 1999	Harlan; 1989	Storm Cat	Storm Bird
Sire Harlan's Holiday (USA) 1999	Harlan; 1989	Storm Cat	Terlingua
Sire Harlan's Holiday (USA) 1999	Harlan; 1989	Country Romance	Halo
Sire Harlan's Holiday (USA) 1999	Harlan; 1989	Country Romance	Sweet Romance
Sire Harlan's Holiday (USA) 1999	Christmas in Aiken; 1992	Affirmed	Exclusive Native
Sire Harlan's Holiday (USA) 1999	Christmas in Aiken; 1992	Affirmed	Won't Tell You
Sire Harlan's Holiday (USA) 1999	Christmas in Aiken; 1992	Dowager	Honest Pleasure
Sire Harlan's Holiday (USA) 1999	Christmas in Aiken; 1992	Dowager	Princessnesian
Dam Steelin' (USA) 2004	Orientate; 1998	Mt Livermore	Blushing Groom
Dam Steelin' (USA) 2004	Orientate; 1998	Mt Livermore	Flama Ardiente
Dam Steelin' (USA) 2004	Orientate; 1998	Dream Team	Cox's Ridge
Dam Steelin' (USA) 2004	Orientate; 1998	Dream Team	Likely Double
Dam Steelin' (USA) 2004	Steel Band; 1997	Carson City	Mr Prospector
Dam Steelin' (USA) 2004	Steel Band; 1997	Carson City	Blushing Promise
Dam Steelin' (USA) 2004	Steel Band; 1997	Wedding Band	Mighty Appealing
Dam Steelin' (USA) 2004	Steel Band; 1997	Wedding Band	Ring of Steel (Family: 8-h)
