= Orb (horse) =

American-bred Thoroughbred racehorse

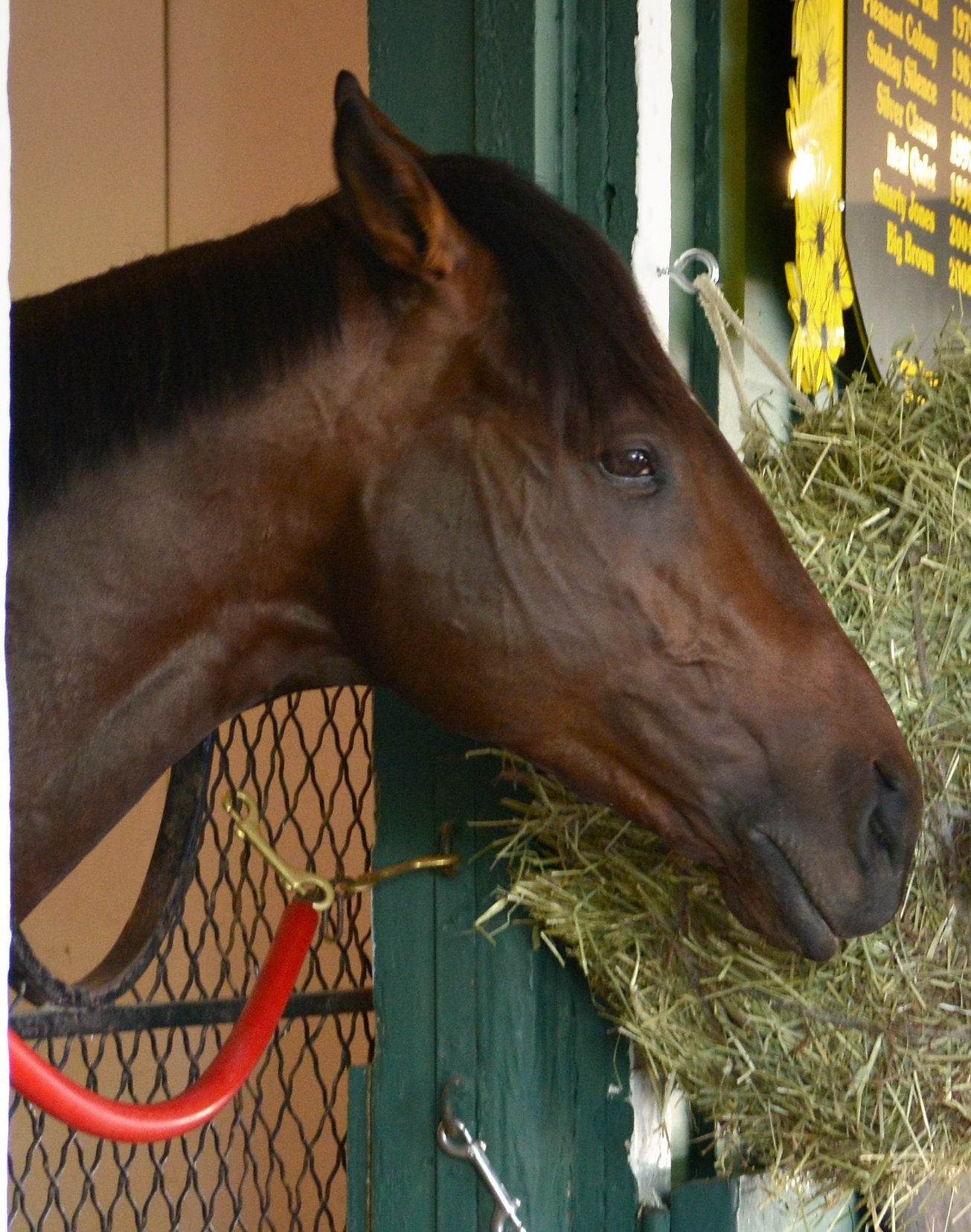
- Orb at Pimlico in May 2013
- Sire: Malibu Moon
- Grandsire: A.P. Indy
- Dam: Lady Liberty
- Damsire: Unbridled
- Sex: Stallion
- Foaled: February 24, 2010
- Country: United States
- Colour: Bay
- Breeder: Stuart S Janney III & Phipps Stable
- Owner: Stuart S Janney III & Phipps Stable
- Trainer: Claude McGaughey III
- Record: 12:5-0-3
- Earnings: $2,605,850

Major wins
- Fountain of Youth Stakes (2013); Florida Derby (2013); Triple Crown Race wins: Kentucky Derby (2013)

Orb (foaled February 24, 2010 in Kentucky) is a champion American Thoroughbred racehorse who won the 2013 Kentucky Derby.

== Background ==
Orb is a bay colt with a small white star bred and owned by Stuart S. Janney III and Phipps Stable. He was sired by Malibu Moon, whose other progeny include the Grade I winners Declan's Moon, Devil May Care, Life At Ten (Beldame Stakes) and Malibu Prayer (Ruffian Handicap). His dam, Lady Liberty, was sired by the 1990 Kentucky Derby winner Unbridled. Lady Liberty won four races in 12 starts and was retired from racing in 2005. Orb is her only stakes winner out of five live foals. On his dam's side, Orb is descended from Laughter, a sister of the outstanding racemare Ruffian.

Orb was trained by the veteran Claude R. "Shug" McGaughey, III, who had handled the previous Phipps champions Easy Goer and Personal Ensign.

== Racing career ==
=== 2012: Two-year-old season ===
It took Orb four tries to break his maiden. In his first career start, Orb finished third in a maiden special weight race run at Saratoga. and finished fourth in another maiden special weight race at Belmont Park in September. He was fourth in another maiden special weight race at Aqueduct Racetrack. He finally broke his maiden a few weeks later on November 24 at Aqueduct Racetrack.

=== 2013: Three-year-old season ===
Orb began his three-year-old season by winning an allowance race at Gulfstream Park over nine furlongs on January 26. Four weeks later, on February 23, Orb was moved up in class to contest the Grade II Fountain of Youth Stakes at 1 1/16 miles at Gulfstream Park. Ridden by John R. Velazquez, he won the race by half a length, defeating the odds-on favorite Violence. On March 30, Orb started as the 29/10 second favorite for the Grade I Florida Derby. He was settled in fifth place before moving up on the outside to take the lead inside the final furlong and won by 2 3/4 lengths from Itsmyluckyday.

On May 4, 2013, Orb, ridden by Joel Rosario, started as the favorite for the 139th Kentucky Derby. Rosario positioned the colt toward the rear of the 19-horse field in the early stages as the outsider Palace Malice set a fast pace. From half distance, Orb began to make progress on the outside and turned into the straight just behind the leaders. Normandy Invasion took the lead from Palace Malice, but Orb continued to make ground in the center of the sloppy track. The favorite took the lead 1/16 of a mile from home and pulled away to win by 2 1/2 lengths from Golden Soul in a final time of 2:02:89. McGaughey, who had just won the race for the first time, said, "I've always dreamed of this day and it finally came... I'm thrilled for the people who put in so much time on this horse, and of course I'm thrilled for me."

Orb started as the 3/5 favorite for the Preakness Stakes two weeks later after looking impressive in training. In the race, however, he was never able to mount a challenge and finished fourth behind the upset winner Oxbow. At the Belmont Stakes on June 8, Orb started as the 11/5 favorite against 13 opponents. Rosario held the colt up at the rear of the field and made steady progress in the last half mile. He was never able to reach the lead and finished third behind Palace Malice and Oxbow.

After a break of well over two months spent at the Fair Hill Training Center, Orb returned for the Travers Stakes at Saratoga Race Course on August 24 when his opponents included Palace Malice and the Haskell Invitational Stakes winner Verrazano. Ridden by Jose Lezcano, Orb took the lead a 1/4 mile from the finish but was overtaken in the closing stages and finished third behind Will Take Charge and Moreno. McGaughey said, "He ran a good race. You can't cry over spilled milk. We got him back on the right track, and now we'll point for something else."

Orb returned on September 28 in the Jockey Club Gold Cup in which he was matched against older horses. He finished last of the eight runners behind Ron the Greek. On November 5, 2013, he was officially retired from racing and returned to Claiborne Farm, where he had been foaled, to stand at stud as a breeding stallion for the 2014 season.

== Stud career ==
Orb stood at stud at Claiborne Farm, in Paris, Ky. with a 2020 stud fee of $10,000. Orb has also been syndicated, and all of the members have breeding rights relating to the number of shares they hold. He was bred to approximately 105 mares in 2014.

He resided in the same paddock in which Triple Crown winner Secretariat once resided.

On June 11, 2017, Orb was represented by his first winner as a sire when his son Earth won a maiden special weight at Gulfstream Park at first asking. In the five-furlong turf race, Earth ran down a filly named Pocket Book to win by a neck.

In April 2021, Orb was purchased by a group of Uruguayan breeders to stand at stud Haras Cuatro Piedras, a farm owned by Uruguayan Breeders Association president Pablo Salomone.

== In popular culture ==
Since winning the Kentucky Derby in 2013, Orb has been referenced in several episodes of the Maximum Fun podcast My Brother, My Brother and Me. Orb, as part of a running gag, is described as a literal orb, an alien construction masquerading as a horse in order to breed with "Earth horse-women".

== Pedigree ==
Pedigree of Orb (USA), bay stallion, 2010
Sire Malibu Moon (USA) 1997	A.P. Indy; 1989	Seattle Slew	Bold Reasoning
Sire Malibu Moon (USA) 1997	A.P. Indy; 1989	Seattle Slew	My Charmer
Sire Malibu Moon (USA) 1997	A.P. Indy; 1989	Weekend Surprise	Secretariat
Sire Malibu Moon (USA) 1997	A.P. Indy; 1989	Weekend Surprise	Lassie Dear
Sire Malibu Moon (USA) 1997	Macoumba; 1992	Mr Prospector*	Raise a Native
Sire Malibu Moon (USA) 1997	Macoumba; 1992	Mr Prospector*	Gold Digger
Sire Malibu Moon (USA) 1997	Macoumba; 1992	Maximova	Green Dancer
Sire Malibu Moon (USA) 1997	Macoumba; 1992	Maximova	Baracala
Dam Lady Liberty (USA) 1999	Unbridled; 1987	Fappiano	Mr Prospector*
Dam Lady Liberty (USA) 1999	Unbridled; 1987	Fappiano	Killaloe
Dam Lady Liberty (USA) 1999	Unbridled; 1987	Gana Facil	Le Fabuleux
Dam Lady Liberty (USA) 1999	Unbridled; 1987	Gana Facil	Charedi
Dam Lady Liberty (USA) 1999	Mesabi Maiden; 1993	Cox's Ridge	Best Turn
Dam Lady Liberty (USA) 1999	Mesabi Maiden; 1993	Cox's Ridge	Our Martha
Dam Lady Liberty (USA) 1999	Mesabi Maiden; 1993	Steel Maiden	Damascus
Dam Lady Liberty (USA) 1999	Mesabi Maiden; 1993	Steel Maiden	Laughter (Family: 8-c)

- Orb is inbred 3s × 4d to the stallion Mr Prospector, meaning that he appears third generation on the sire side of his pedigree and fourth generation on the dam side of his pedigree.
