= 2008 Belmont Stakes =

American horse race

140th Belmont Stakes
- Belmont Stakes
- "The Test of the Champion"
- Location: Belmont Park; Elmont, New York, U.S.
- Date: June 7, 2008
- Distance: 1 1/2 mi (12 furlongs; 2,414 m)
- Winning horse: Da'Tara
- Winning time: 2:29.65
- Final odds: 38.50 (to 1)
- Jockey: Alan Garcia
- Trainer: Nick Zito
- Owner: Robert LaPenta
- Conditions: Fast
- Surface: Dirt

The 2008 Belmont Stakes was the 140th running of the Belmont Stakes. The race was won by Da'Tara, who led the race wire to wire. Da'Tara went off at 38–1 odds, making the win a monumental upset. Entrants included the favorite, winner of both the Kentucky Derby and Preakness, Big Brown, but he eased on last place, a first for any Triple Crown hopeful. A win by Big Brown would have marked the first Triple Crown since Affirmed in 1978. Other entrants were Derby runners Denis of Cork, Tale of Ekati, and Anak Nakal; Preakness runner up Macho Again and third-place finisher Icabad Crane; and Peter Pan runner, Ready's Echo. The sire of Anak Nakal, Victory Gallop, is a Belmont winner, while Casino Drive has two Belmont-winning siblings.

Casino Drive was scratched from the race the morning of the race with an injured hoof. He was the Peter Pan Stakes winner, and the half brother of 2007 Belmont Stakes winner Rags to Riches and 2006 Belmont Stakes winner Jazil. A win by Casino Drive would have been the first time that siblings have won the same Triple Crown race in three consecutive years. Kent Desormeaux, the regular jockey for both Big Brown and Casino Drive, rode Big Brown while two-time Belmont winner Edgar Prado had been scheduled to ride Casino Drive.

The race was seen before 94,476 fans.

== Payout ==
Pgm	Horse	Win	Place	Show
6	Da'Tara	$79.00	28.00	14.80
4	Denis of Cork		5.40	4.10
8 (DH)	Anak Nakal			7.60
9 (DH)	Ready's Echo			6.20

- $2 Exacta (6-4) Paid $659.00
- $2 Trifecta (6-4-8) Paid $3,703.00
- $2 Trifecta (6-4-9) Paid $3,954.00
- $2 Superfecta (6-4-8-9) Paid $48,637.00
- $2 Superfecta (6-4-9-8) Paid $47,309.00

== Results ==
As provided by Equibase

Finished	Time/ Behind	Pgm	Horse	Jockey	Trainer	Odds
1	2:29.65	6	Da'Tara	Alan Garcia	Nick Zito	38-1
2	5 1/4	4	Denis of Cork	Robby Albarado	David M. Carroll	7-1
3 (DH)	8	8	Anak Nakal	Julien Leparoux	Nick Zito	34-1
3 (DH)	8	9	Ready's Echo	John Velazquez	Todd Pletcher	29-1
5	11	3	Macho Again	Garrett Gomez	Dallas Stewart	17-1
6	18 1/4	7	Tale of Ekati	Eibar Coa	Barclay Tagg	14-1
7	24 3/4	2	Guadalcanal	Javier Castellano	Frederick J. Seitz	25-1
8	25 1/4	10	Icabad Crane	Jeremy Rose	H. Graham Motion	17-1
9	Eased	1	Big Brown	Kent Desormeaux	Rick Dutrow	1-4
Scratched		~~5~~	~~Casino Drive~~	~~Edgar Prado~~	~~Kazuo Fujisawa~~	~~7-2~~
