= 2008 Kentucky Derby =

Horse race

134th Kentucky Derby Presented by Yum! Brands
- Kentucky Derby
- Location: Churchill Downs
- Date: May 3, 2008
- Winning horse: Big Brown
- Winning time: 2:01.82
- Starting price: 5-2
- Jockey: Kent Desormeaux
- Trainer: Richard E. Dutrow Jr.
- Owner: IEAH Stables / Paul Pompa Jr.
- Conditions: Fast
- Surface: Dirt
- Attendance: 157,770

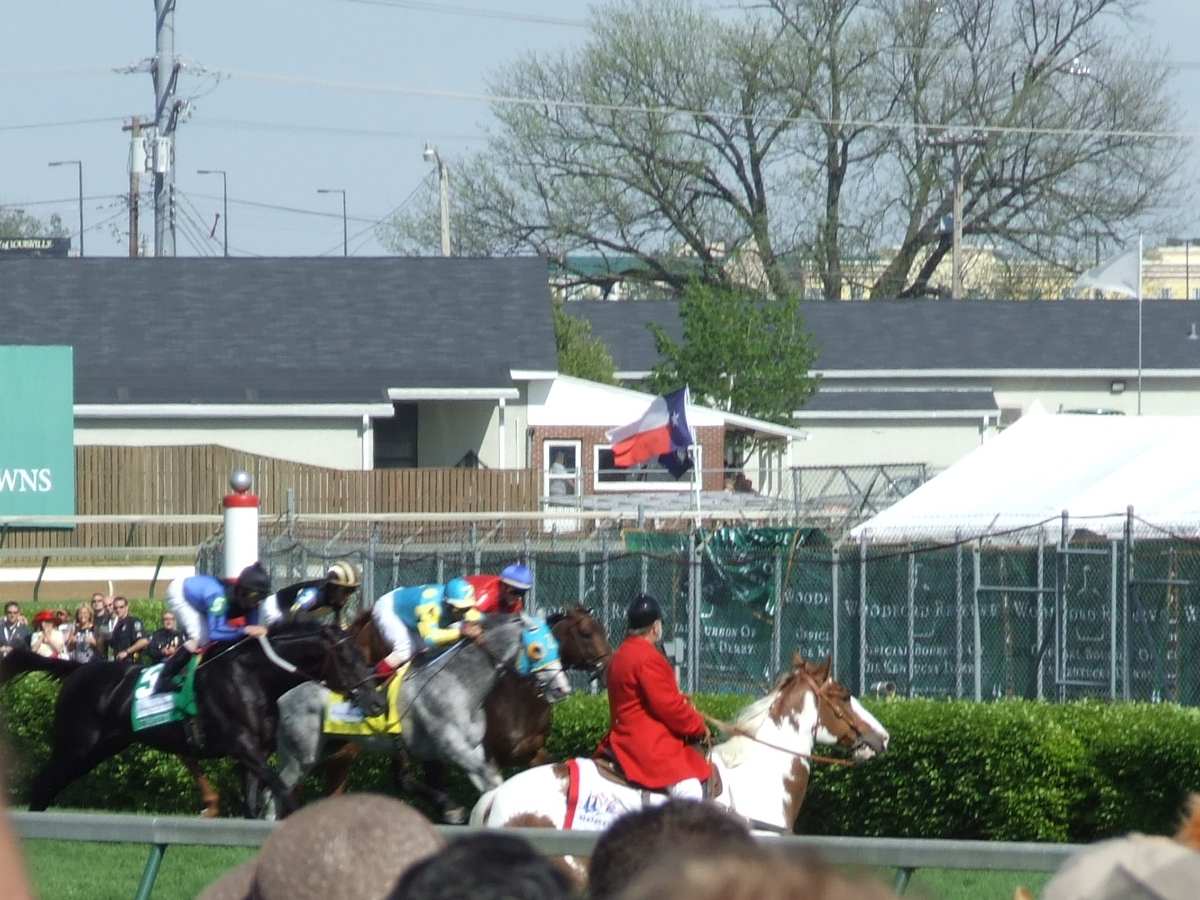
2008 Kentucky Derby

The 2008 Kentucky Derby was the 134th running of the Kentucky Derby. The race took place on May 3, 2008, with 157,770 in attendance, the second largest in Derby history. Post time was 6:15 p.m. EDT and was televised in the United States on the NBC television network.

Big Brown won the race by nearly five lengths. Eight Belles, the second-place finisher and the first filly to run the Derby in nine years, was euthanized following the end of the race after fracturing both front ankles while galloping out. It is believed to be the first fatality in Kentucky Derby history.

== Payout ==
The 134th Kentucky Derby Payout Schedule

Program Number	Horse Name	Win	Place	Show
20	Big Brown	US$6.80	$5.00	$4.80
5	Eight Belles	-	$10.60	$6.40
16	Denis of Cork	-	-	$11.60

- $2 Exacta (20-5) Paid $141.60
- $2 Trifecta (20-5-16) Paid $3,445.60
- $2 Superfecta (20-5-16-2) Paid $58,737.80

== Field ==
Big Brown was made the 2-1 favorite off the strength of his win in the Florida Derby. Other leading contenders included Colonel John (Santa Anita Derby), Pyro (Louisiana Derby), and the filly Eight Belles (Fantasy Stakes).

Finished	Time/ Behind	Post	Horse	Jockey	Trainer	Owner	Odds
1	-2:01.82	20	Big Brown	Kent Desormeaux	Richard E. Dutrow Jr.	IEAH Stables & Paul Pompa Jr.	2-1
2	04 3/4	5	Eight Belles	Gabriel Saez	Larry Jones	Fox Hill Farms, Inc.	13-1
3	08 1/4	16	Denis of Cork	Calvin Borel	David Carroll	Mr. & Mrs. William K. Warren Jr.	27-1
4	11	2	Tale of Ekati	Eibar Coa	Barclay Tagg	Charles E. Fipke	37-1
5	11 3/4	18	Recapturetheglory	E. T. Baird	Louie J. Roussel III	Louie J. Roussel III & Ronald Lamarque	49-1
6	14 1/4	10	Colonel John	Corey Nakatani	Eoin G. Harty	WinStar Farm LLC	9-2
7	15	3	Anak Nakal	Rafael Bejarano	Nick Zito	Four Roses Thoroughbreds LLC	53-1
8	15	9	Pyro	Shaun Bridgmohan	Steve Asmussen	Winchell Thoroughbreds LLC	5-1
9	15 3/4	17	Cowboy Cal	John Velazquez	Todd Pletcher	Stonerside Stable	39-1
10	19 1/2	6	Z Fortune	Robby Albarado	Steve Asmussen	Zayat Stables, LLC	19-1
11	21	12	Smooth Air	Manoel Cruz	Bennie Stutts Jr.	Mount Joy Stables, Inc.	42-1
12	22 3/4	8	Visionaire	Jose Lezcano	Michael Matz	Team Valor & Vision Racing LLC	25-1
13	24 1/4	4	Court Vision	Garrett Gomez	William I. Mott	IEAH Stables & WinStar Farm LLC	17-1
14	24 1/2	11	Z Humor	René Douglas	William I. Mott	Zayat Stables, LLC	63-1
15	31 3/4	1	Cool Coal Man	Julien Leparoux	Nick Zito	Robert V. LaPenta	44-1
16	32	13	Bob Black Jack	Richard Migliore	James Kasparoff	Jeff Harmon & Tim Kasparoff	29-1
17	36 3/4	19	Gayego	Mike E. Smith	Paulo Lobo	Cubanacan Stables	18-1
18	48 3/4	7	Big Truck	Javier Castellano	Barclay Tagg	Eric Fein	28-1
19	50 3/4	15	Adriano	Edgar Prado	Graham Motion	Courtlandt Farms	28-1
20	59 1/4	14	Monba	Ramon Domínguez	Todd Pletcher	Starlight, Lucarelli & Saylor	31-1

== Subsequent Grade I wins ==
Several horses recorded Grade I wins after the Derby.

- Big Brown – Preakness Stakes, Haskell Invitational
- Bob Black Jack – Malibu Stakes
- Colonel John – Travers Stakes
- Court Vision – Hollywood Derby, 2009 Turf Mile Stakes, 2010 Breeders' Cup Mile, Gulfstream Park Turf Handicap, Woodbine Mile
- Gayego – 2009 Ancient Title Stakes
- Pyro – 2009 Forego Stakes
- Tale of Ekati – Cigar Mile
- Visionaire – King's Bishop Stakes

== Subsequent breeding careers ==
Leading progeny of participants in the 2008 Kentucky Derby

Big Brown (1st)

- Dortmund – Los Alamitos Futurity, Santa Anita Derby. 3rd in 2015 Kentucky Derby

Colonel John (6th)

- La Coronel – Queen Elizabeth II Challenge Stakes

Court Vision (13th)

- Storm the Court – 2019 American champion 3yo, Breeders' Cup Juvenile
- Mr. Havercamp – 2018 Canadian champion older horse
- King and His Court – 2016 Canadian champion 2yo

Tale of Ekati (4th)

- Girvin – Haskell Invitational

Sources: American Classic Pedigrees, Equibase, Blood-Horse Stallion Register

== See also ==
- 2008 Preakness Stakes
- 2008 Belmont Stakes
