= Denis of Cork =

American-bred Thoroughbred racehorse

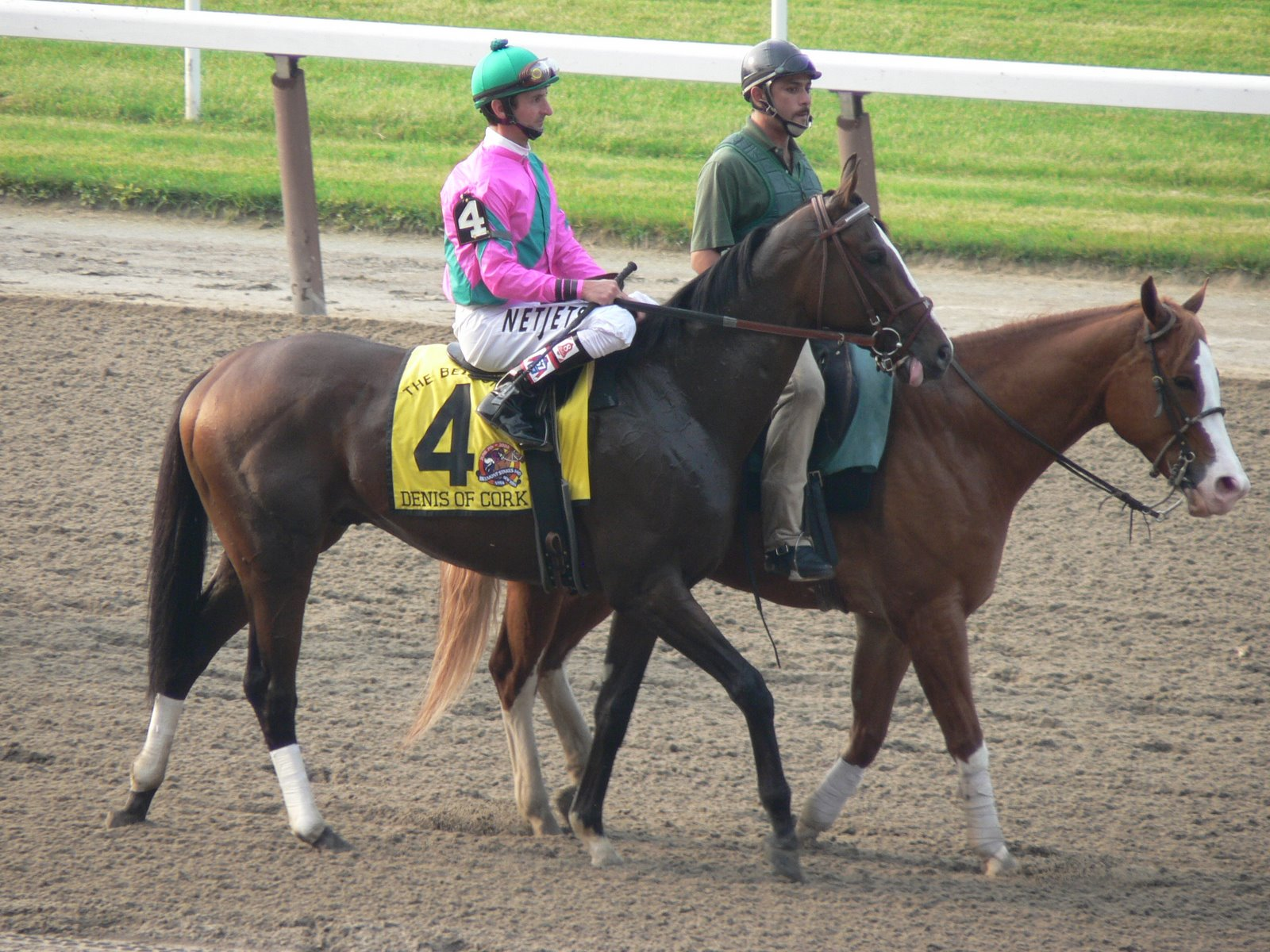
- 2008 Belmont Stakes
- Sire: Harlan's Holiday
- Grandsire: Harlan
- Dam: Unbridled Girl
- Damsire: Unbridled
- Sex: Stallion
- Foaled: 2005
- Country: United States
- Colour: Bay
- Breeder: Westbury Stables
- Owner: M/M William K. Warren, Jr.
- Trainer: David M. Carroll
- Record: 6: 3-1-1
- Earnings: US$613,252

Major wins
- Southwest Stakes (2008)
- Last updated on February 12, 2010

Denis of Cork (foaled February 16, 2005 in Florida) is an American Thoroughbred racehorse, graded stakes winner, and stallion. He is best known for his runner-up finish in the 2008 Belmont Stakes and third-place finish in the 2008 Kentucky Derby.

== Background ==
Denis of Cork is sired by Harlan's Holiday and out of the Unbridled mare, Unbridled Girl. Bred by Westbury Stables, he was purchased in the OBS August Yearling Sale in 2006 for $120,000. He was purchased a second time in the Barretts March Two-Year Olds In Training auction in 2007 for $250,000 by Mr. William K. & Mrs. Suzanne Warren Jr.

== Racing career ==
Trained by David M. Carroll, Denis of Cork is best known for his third-place finish in the 2008 Kentucky Derby and for his second-place finish in the 2008 Belmont Stakes.

The colt earned his first win in a maiden special weight ran at a distance of 7 furlongs, winning by three-quarters of a length. He came five lengths off the lead turning for home, and built up enough strength to propel himself to the front so that he could fight with the front-runner. When they finished, there was a gap of 7½ lengths back to the third-place finisher. He finished the race in a sharp time of 1:22.42.

He made his second appearance in an allowance race at Fair Grounds Race Course in New Orleans, Louisiana. The race was distanced at 1 mile and 40 yards, and he finished in front by a head.

In his third race, Denis of Cork won the one mile Grade III Southwest Stakes at Oaklawn Park Race Track in Hot Springs, Arkansas. Again, the colt gained momentum moving off the final turn, and won with a time of 1:37:89.

=== 2008 Kentucky Derby ===
His fourth start, the Illinois Derby, was his first loss, where he finished 5th behind 1st-place finisher Recapturetheglory. Despite this, his earnings were enough to score him a spot in the 2008 Kentucky Derby, where he finished 3rd behind champion colt, Big Brown, and the ill-fated filly, Eight Belles.

=== 2008 Belmont Stakes ===
Denis of Cork skipped the Preakness Stakes so that he could return for the Belmont Stakes as a fresh horse. This paid off, as he finished 2nd behind the upset-winner, Da' Tara. However, when Denis of Cork returned from the Belmont Stakes, it was discovered that the colt had suffered from a pre-condylar fracture in one of his hind ankles. After this was discovered, the colt was sidelined for the rest of the season.

== Retirement ==
Denis of Cork spent the 2009 winter at Fair Grounds Race Course after being returned to his trainer when he had fully recovered from a stifle injury suffered in January 2009. He was expected to return to racing until a soft tissue injury was found after a breeze in early January 2010.

Denis of Cork was retired to stud at the Vinery near Summerfield, Florida for a fee of $2,500. Tom Ludt, Vinery president, explained his pleasure with the decision. "Denis of Cork showed a lot of class on the racetrack. He won three races, including a graded stakes, and placed in two classics in only six starts. He's by a stallion who continues to prove himself, and we are very pleased to stand him."

in 2011, Denis of Cork was moved to stand at James Casey's Taylor Mountain Farm in Charles Town, West Virginia, where he currently stands. Standing alongside stallions Juba, Luftikus, and Windsor Castle, his best foals include stakes runners Romantic Cork, Celtic Moon, Return to Denis, and Bray's Secret.
