= 2008 Preakness Stakes =

133rd running of the Preakness Stakes

133rd Preakness Stakes
- The Preakness Stakes
- "The Middle Jewel of the Triple Crown" "The Run for the Black-Eyed Susans"
- Location: Pimlico Race Course, Baltimore, Maryland, United States
- Date: May 17, 2008
- Winning horse: Big Brown
- Winning time: 1:54.86
- Final odds: 1-5
- Jockey: Kent Desormeaux
- Trainer: Richard E. Dutrow Jr.
- Conditions: Fast
- Surface: Dirt
- Attendance: 121,876

The 2008 Preakness Stakes was the 133rd running of the Preakness Stakes thoroughbred horse race. The race time was at 6:15 pm EDT and was televised in the United States on the NBC television network. Big Brown, the 1-5 favorite, was the winner by 5 1/4 lengths over Macho Again. Approximate post time was 6:17 p.m. Eastern Time. The race was run over a fast track in a final time of 1:54.80. The Maryland Jockey Club reported total attendance of 121,876, the second highest attended American thoroughbred racing event in 2008.

== Payout ==
The 133rd Preakness Stakes Payout Schedule

Program Number	Horse Name	Win	Place	Show
7	Big Brown	$ 2.40	$2.60	$2.40
1	Macho Again	-	$17.20	$10.40
3	Icabad Crane	-	-	$5.60

- $2 Exacta: (7-1) paid $36.60
- $2 Trifecta: (7-1-3) paid $336.80
- $1 Superfecta: (7-1-3-6) paid $1,192.30

== The full chart ==
Finish Position	Margin (lengths)	Post Position	Horse name	Jockey	Trainer	Owner	Post Time Odds	Purse Earnings
1st	0	7	Big Brown	Kent Desormeaux	Richard E. Dutrow Jr.	IEAH Stables	1-5 favorite	$600,000
2nd	5 1/4	1	Macho Again	Julien Leparoux	Dallas Stewart	West Point Thoroughbreds	40-1	$200,000
3rd	5 3/4	3	Icabad Crane	Jeremy Rose	H. Graham Motion	Earle I. Mack	22-1	$110,000
4th	6 1/2	6	Racecar Rhapsody	Robby Albarado	Ken McPeek	Carroll, Kaplan, Plattner & Guilfoyle	25-1	$60,000
5th	10 3/4	9	Stevil	John Velazquez	Nick Zito	Robert V. LaPenta	41-1	$30,000
6th	14 1/2	8	Kentucky Bear	Jamie Theriot	Reade Baker	Bear Stables Ltd.	14-1	
7th	15	13	Hey Byrn	Chuck Lopez	Edward Plesa Jr.	Beatrice Oxenberg	34-1	
8th	15 3/4	11	Giant Moon	Ramon Dominguez	Richard E. Schosberg	Albert Fried Jr.	37-1	
9th	17 1/2	2	Tres Borrachos	Tyler Baze	C. Beau Greely	C. B. Greeley & P. Houchens	43-1	
10th	18 3/4	4	Yankee Bravo	Alex Solis	Patrick Gallagher	Bienstock & Winner Stables	24-1	
11th	26	12	Gayego	Mike E. Smith	Paulo Lobo	Cubanacan Stables	9-1	
12th	26 1/4	10	Riley Tucker	Edgar Prado	William I. Mott	Zayat Stables	36-1	
Scr	Scr	5	Behindatthebar	David Flores	Todd Pletcher	Padua Stables	Scr	

- Winning Breeder: Monticule; (KY)
- Final Time: 1:54.86
- Track Condition: Fast
- Total Attendance: 121,876

== See also ==
- 2008 Kentucky Derby
- 2008 Belmont Stakes
