= Poker Stakes =

- Class: Grade III
- Location: Belmont Park; Elmont, New York, United States
- Inaugurated: 1983
- Race type: Thoroughbred – Flat racing
- Website: NYRA

Race information
- Distance: 1 mile (8 furlongs)
- Surface: Turf
- Track: Left-handed
- Qualification: Four-year-olds and older
- Weight: 124lbs with allowances
- Purse: US$200,000 (2023)

The Poker Stakes is a Grade III American Thoroughbred horse race for horses aged four years old and older held over a distance of one mile (8 furlongs) on the turf held annually in mid June at Belmont Park in Elmont, New York.

== History ==
The event is named in honor of Poker who defeated champions Assagai and his stablemate Buckpasser in the 1967 Bowling Green Handicap at Belmont Park. More importantly Poker became a Champion Broodmare Sire. Poker was a son of the top-class sire and broodmare sire Round Table. Poker's daughters produced numerous champions including champion sire Seattle Slew. The latter twice topped the US broodmare sires list, and his daughters have produced a host of champions. Poker is also the maternal grandsire of US champion, Silver Charm, as well as the useful sire, Lomond (himself a champion sire in Italy).

The inaugural running of the Poker Stakes was on 25 September 1983 and was won by the Gasper S. Moshera trained Freon in a time of 2:03 1/5 over the distance of a mile and a quarter on the turf. The following year the event was not held but in 1985 it was run over the 1 1/16 miles distance.

The event was classified as Grade III in 1988 and has held this class since.

The event was not held in 2010.

Several fine horses have appeared in this event including Volponi who won the event in 2007 and later won the Breeders' Cup Classic in the same year. Also Kip Deville winner of the Breeders' Cup Mile in 2007 featured in this event 2008 winning easily as the short odds on favorite and giving up to eleven pounds to his competitors. Caress and the Australian bred mare Oleksandra are the only mares to have won this race. Oleksandra was having her last start in her career due to being in foal to the sire Into Mischief.

In 2024 the event was moved to Saratoga Racetrack due to infield tunnel and redevelopment work at Belmont Park.

== Records ==
Speed record:

- 1:31.23 – Oscar Performance (2018)

This time is a course record for Belmont's Widener Turf Course, and ties the North American record for one mile on the turf.

Margins:

- 7 lengths – Scottish Monk (1990)

Most wins:

- 2 – Fourstardave (1989, 1993)
- 2 – Affirmed Success (2000, 2001)
- 2 – King Kreesa (2013, 2015)

Most wins by an owner:

- 3 – Juddmonte Farms (2003, 2007, 2022)

Most wins by a jockey:

- 3 – José L. Ortiz (2015, 2018, 2020)
- 3 – Jose Lezcano (2011, 2012, 2016)
- 3 – Jerry Bailey (1991, 1998, 2001)
- 3 – Jorge Chavez (1994, 1999, 2000)
- 3 – José A. Santos (1987, 1988, 1989)

Most wins by a trainer:

- 5 – William I. Mott (1998, 2011, 2012, 2017, 2026)

== Winners ==
Year	Winner	Age	Jockey	Trainer	Owner	Distance	Time	Purse	Grade	Ref
At Saratoga – Poker Stakes
2026	Pass the Hat	5	John R. Velazquez	William I. Mott	Pin Oak Stud	1 mile	1:32.92	$300,000	III	
2025	Donegal Momentum	4	Javier Castellano	Thomas Morley	Donegal Racing	1 mile	1:34.22	$300,000	III	
2024	Ice Chocolat (BRZ)	6	Irad Ortiz Jr.	Mark E. Casse	Gary Barber, Wachtel Stable & Peter Deutsch	1 mile	1:33.97	$350,000	III	
At Belmont Park
2023	Emmanuel	4	Irad Ortiz Jr.	Todd A. Pletcher	Siena Farm & WinStar Farm	1 mile	1:34.25	$200,000	III	
2022	Masen (GB)	4	Flavien Prat	Chad C. Brown	Juddmonte Farms	1 mile	1:34.16	$242,500	III	
2021	ƒ Oleksandra (AUS)	7	Joel Rosario	Neil D. Drysdale	Team Valor International	1 mile	1:32.11	$250,000	III	
2020	Social Paranoia	4	José L. Ortiz	Todd A. Pletcher	The Elkstone Group	1 mile	1:36.30	$150,000	III	
2019	Gucci Factor	4	Joel Rosario	Christophe Clement	Castleton Lyons	1 mile	1:32.54	$300,000	III	
2018	Oscar Performance	4	José L. Ortiz	Brian A. Lynch	Amerman Racing (Jerry & Joan Amerman)	1 mile	1:31.23	$300,000	III	
2017	Ballagh Rocks	4	Jose Lezcano	William I. Mott	Donegal Racing	1 mile	1:34.98	$294,000	III	
2016	Obviously (IRE)	8	Jose Lezcano	Philip D'Amato	Anthony Fanticola & Joseph Sardino	1 mile	1:31.65	$300,000	III	
2015	King Kreesa	6	José L. Ortiz	David G. Donk	Susan & Gerald Kresa	1 mile	1:33.48	$300,000	III	
2014	§ Jack Milton	4	Javier Castellano	Todd A. Pletcher	Gary Barber	1 mile	1:33.09	$300,000	III	
2013	King Kreesa	4	Irad Ortiz Jr.	Jeremiah C. Englehart	G & S Kresa	1 mile	1:33.65	$150,000	III	
2012	Clear Attempt	4	Jose Lezcano	William I. Mott	Pam & Martin Wygod	1 mile	1:34.01	$150,000	III	
2011	Courageous Cat	5	Jose Lezcano	William I. Mott	Pam & Martin Wygod	1 mile	1:36.69	$98,000	III	
2010	Race not held									
2009	Sailor's Cap	4	Alan Garcia	James J. Toner	Team Valor	1 mile	1:36.50	$103,500	III	
Poker Handicap
2008	Kip Deville	5	Cornelio Velásquez	Richard E. Dutrow Jr.	IEAH Stables, Pegasus Holding Group Stables, J. Roberts & A. & S. Cohen	1 mile	1:32.94	$106,300	III	
2007	Art Master	6	Garrett K. Gomez	Robert J. Frankel	Juddmonte Farms	1 mile	1:33.21	$112,600	III	
2006	Rebel Rebel (IRE)	4	Edgar S. Prado	Richard E. Dutrow Jr.	IEAH Stables & Resolute Group Stables	1 mile	1:33.34	$110,900	III	
2005	Mr. Light (ARG)	6	Cornelio Velásquez	Angel A. Penna Jr.	Earle I. Mack	1 mile	1:32.18	$111,800	III	
2004	Christine's Outlaw	4	Shaun Bridgmohan	George Weaver	R.C. Hill Stable	1 mile	1:32.46	$112,600	III	
2003	War Zone	4	Javier Castellano	Robert J. Frankel	Juddmonte Farms	1 mile	1:32.81	$116,200	III	
2002	Volponi	4	Shaun Bridgmohan	Philip G. Johnson	Amherst Stable & Spruce Pond Stable	1 mile	1:32.24	$111,200	III	
2001	Affirmed Success	7	Jerry D. Bailey	Richard E. Schosberg	Albert Fried Jr.	1 mile	1:34.60	$110,400	III	
2000	Affirmed Success	6	Jorge F. Chavez	Richard E. Schosberg	Albert Fried Jr.	1 mile	1:34.06	$113,800	III	
1999	Rob 'n Gin	5	Jorge F. Chavez	Robert Barbara	Sabine Stable	1 mile	1:32.81	$115,200	III	
1998	Elusive Quality	5	Jerry D. Bailey	William I. Mott	Mohammed al Maktoum	1 mile	1:31.63	$85,400	III	
1997	Draw Shot	4	Chris Antley	Angel A. Penna Jr.	Francis Santangelo	1 mile	1:33.08	$85,575	III	
1996	Smooth Runner	5	Julie Krone	Richard C. Mettee	Herbert Allen	1 mile	1:33.60	$86,000	III	
Poker Stakes
1995	ƒ Caress	4	Robbie Davis	H. Allen Jerkens	Harbor View Farm	1 mile	1:34.35	$85,050	III	
1994	Dominant Prospect	4	Jorge F. Chavez	Gary Sciacca	Charles A. Coronia	1 mile	1:32.69	$83,176	III	
1993	Fourstardave	8	Richard Migliore	Leo O'Brien	Richard M. Bomze	1 mile	1:33.02	$88,650	III	
1992	Scott the Great	6	Jean-Luc Samyn	William Hebert	August F. Russo	1 mile	1:33.27	$91,350	III	
1991	Who's to Pay	5	Jerry D. Bailey	MacKenzie Miller	Rokeby Stable	1 mile	1:33.40	$93,600	III	
1990	Scottish Monk	7	Ángel Cordero Jr.	Steven T. Jerkens	Cedar Valle Stable	1 mile	1:33.40	$86,850	III	
1989	Fourstardave	4	José A. Santos	Leo O'Brien	Richard M. Bomze	1 mile	1:33.20	$94,350	III	
1988	Wanderkin	5	José A. Santos	Richard O'Connell	Poma Stable	1 mile	1:35.60	$91,200	III	
1987	Double Feint	4	José A. Santos	LeRoy Jolley	Peter M. Brant	1 mile	1:35.20	$57,200		
1986	Island Sun	4	Richard Migliore	Patrick J. Kelly	Live Oak Plantation Racing	1 1/4 miles	2:02.40	$55,500		
1985	Mr. Chromacopy	4	Jean Cruguet	Frank Martin Sr.	Harbor View Farm	1 1/16 miles	1:42.40	$55,700		
1984	Race not held									
1983	Freon	6	Robbie Davis	Gasper S. Moschera	Ann Territo	1 1/4 miles	2:03.20	$41,450		

Legend:
Turf
Notes:
§ Ran as part of an entry
ƒ Filly or Mare

== See also ==
- List of American and Canadian Graded races
