= Monmouth Stakes =

- Class: Listed
- Location: Monmouth Park Racetrack; Oceanport, New Jersey, United States
- Inaugurated: 2008
- Race type: Thoroughbred - Flat racing
- Website: Monmouth Park Racetrack

Race information
- Distance: 1 1/8 miles (9 furlongs)
- Surface: Turf
- Track: Left-handed
- Qualification: Three-years-old and older
- Weight: Base weights with allowances: 4-year-olds and up: 123 lbs. 3-year-olds: 118 lbs.
- Purse: $150,000 (2020)

The Monmouth Stakes is a Listed American Thoroughbred horse race for horses aged three years old over a distance of one and one-eighth miles on the turf held annually in late May or early June at Monmouth Park Racetrack in Oceanport, New Jersey. The event currently carries a purse of $150,000.

== History ==
The inaugural running of the event was on September 13, 2008 when Monmouth Park created the Monmouth Stakes when IEAH Stables said they wanted their Dual Classic winner, Big Brown, to compete in a turf race in the middle of September. (Although Belmont Park was willing to create a race, that never materialized. Philadelphia Park used the Presidents Cup to entice Big Brown to race there.)

The following year the event was moved to June.

In 2010 the event was classified as Grade III.

The event was not held in 2016.

In 2025 the event was downgraded by the Thoroughbred Owners and Breeders Association to Listed status.

== Records ==
Speed record:

- 1:45.93 - Data Link (2012)

Margins:

- 5 lengths – Redistricting (GB) (2025)

Most wins by a horse

- 2 - Money Multiplier (2017, 2018)
- 2 - Almanaar (GB) (2019, 2020)

Most wins by a jockey:

- 4 - Joe Bravo (2014, 2018, 2019, 2020)

Most wins by a trainer:

- 8 - Chad C. Brown (2017, 2018, 2019, 2020, 2021, 2022, 2024, 2025)

Most wins by an owner:

- 2 – Shadwell Stable (2019, 2020)
- 2 – Michael Dubb (2021, 2022)
- 2 – Klaravich Stables (2017, 2025)

== Winners ==
Year	Winner	Age	Jockey	Trainer	Owner	Distance	Time	Purse	Grade	Ref
2025	Redistricting (GB)	5	Flavien Prat	Chad C. Brown	Klaravich Stables	1 1/8 miles	1:49.78	$150,000	Listed	
2024	Fort Washington	5	Kendrick Carmouche	Claude R. McGaughey III	Magic Cap Stables	1 1/8 miles	1:48.70	$157,500	III	Dead heat
2024	Running Bee	5	Vincent Cheminaud	Chad C. Brown	Calumet Farm	1 1/8 miles	1:48.70	$157,500	III	Dead heat
2023	Catnip	4	Joel Rosario	Michael Stidham	John & Susan Moore	1 1/8 miles	1:47.40	$150,000	III	
2022	Sacred Life (FR)	8	Manuel Franco	Chad C. Brown	Michael Dubb, Madaket Stables, Wonder Stables & Michael J. Caruso	1 1/8 miles	1:47.70	$162,000	III	
2021	Devamani (FR)	8	Nik Juarez	Chad C. Brown	Michael Dubb, Sanford J. Goldfarb & Samuel Abraham	1 1/8 miles	1:48.90	$156,000	III	
2020	Almanaar (GB)	8	Joe Bravo	Chad C. Brown	Shadwell Stable	1 1/8 miles	1:49.22	$157,500	III	
2019	Almanaar (GB)	7	Joe Bravo	Chad C. Brown	Shadwell Stable	1 1/8 miles	1:45.75	$205,000	II	
2018	Money Multiplier	6	Joe Bravo	Chad C. Brown	Al Shahania Stud	1 1/8 miles	1:46.79	$196,000	II	
2017	Money Multiplier	5	Javier Castellano	Chad C. Brown	Klaravich Stables & William H. Lawrence	1 1/8 miles	1:47.91	$200,000	II	
2016	Race not held									
2015	Triple Threat (FR)	5	Jose Lezcano	William I. Mott	Team Valor & Gary Barber	1 1/8 miles	1:49.89	$205,000	II	
2014	Speaking of Which (IRE)	5	Joe Bravo	Christophe Clement	Moyglare Stud	1 1/8 miles	1:46.32	$217,500	II	
2013	Boisterous	6	John R. Velazquez	Claude R. McGaughey III	Phipps Stable	1 1/8 miles	1:48.84	$202,500	II	
2012	Data Link	4	John R. Velazquez	Claude R. McGaughey III	Stuart S. Janney III	1 1/8 miles	1:45.93	$200,000	II	
2011	Teaks North	4	Eddie Castro	Justin Sallusto	Jules Boutelle	1 1/8 miles	1:48.56	$250,000	III	
2010	Get Serious	6	Pablo Fragoso	John H. Forbes	James M. Dinan, Jacques J. Moore & Phantom House Farm	1 1/8 miles	1:47.11	$255,000	III	
2009	Presious Passion	6	Elvis Trujillo	Mary Hartmann	Patricia A. Generazio	1 1/8 miles	1:47.32	$200,000	Listed	
2008	Big Brown	3	Kent Desormeaux	Richard E. Dutrow, Jr.	IEAH Stables, Paul Pompa Jr., Gary Tolchin, Andrew Cohen & Pegasus Holdings	1 1/8 miles	1:47.41	$500,000	Listed	

== See also ==
- List of American and Canadian Graded races
