= Hudson Stakes (NYB) =

- Class: Restricted Stakes
- Location: Belmont Park, Elmont, New York, U.S.
- Inaugurated: 1978
- Race type: Thoroughbred - Flat racing

Race information
- Distance: 1 1/16 miles
- Surface: Dirt
- Track: left-handed
- Qualification: Three-year-olds and up, bred in New York State

The Hudson Stakes (NYB) is an American Thoroughbred horse race held annually at Belmont Park in Elmont, New York. In 1996 it was hosted by another NYRA racing facility, the Aqueduct Racetrack. An important Black type race designed to support the state's breeding industry, the Hudson is restricted to horses aged three and older that were bred in New York State. Originally named the Hudson Handicap, it was changed in 2023 to the Hudson Stakes.

The race name was chosen to honor the English explorer, Henry Hudson for whom the Hudson River was named. It was run at a distance of one mile from 1978 to 1982, at a mile and a sixteenth from 1983 to 1988, seven furlongs from 1989 to 1993, and at six furlongs from 1994 through the present.

== Records ==
Speed record:

- 6 furlongs: Wire Me Collect, 1:08.60, (1997)
- 11/2 furlongs: Moonlight Song, 1:15.58, (2014)
- 7 furlongs: Preporant, 1:21.40, (1993)
- 1 mile: Shy Groom, 1:35.40, (1982)
- 11/16 miles: Tinchen's Prince, 1:41.20, (1988)

Most wins:

- Corma Ray (1994, 1995)
- Friendly Island (2004, 2005)
- General Maximus (2010, 2011)

Most wins by a jockey:

- 3 - Jorge Velásquez (1981, 1983, 1985)
- 3 - John Velazquez (2002, 2004, 2005)

Most wins by a trainer:

- 3 - Richard E. Dutrow Jr. (2002, 2007, 2008)

Most wins by an owner:

- 2 - Tanrackin Farm (Wilhelmine Stewart & Kirby Waller) (1978, 1984)
- 2 - Raymond L. Simoneau (1994, 1995)
- 2 - Anstu Stables, Inc. (Stuart Subotnick) (2004, 2005)
- 2 – IEAH Stables (2007, 2008)
- 2 - Goldmark Farm, Michael Imperio, Elizabeth Loftus (2010, 2011)

Year	Winner	Age	Jockey	Trainer	Owner	Dist. (Miles)	Time	Win $
2024	Light Man	7	Kendrick Carmouche	Bruce N. Levine	McRich Stables	6.5 f	1:16.64	$82,500
2023	Rotknee	4	Jose Lezcano	Michael J. Maker	William. J. Butler	6.5 f	1:16.23	$94,499
2022	My Boy Tate	8	Irad Ortiz Jr.	Michelle Nevin	Michelle Nevin & Little Red Feather Racing (Billy Koch & partners)	6.5 f	1:16.37	$82,500
2021	NY Traffic	4	Irad Ortiz Jr.	Saffie A. Joseph Jr.	John Fanelli, Cash Is King LLC, LC Racing, Paul Braverman & Team Hanley	6.5 f	1:17.51	$82,500
2020	Tribecca	6	Kendrick Carmouche	Chris Englehart	Ronald A. Brown	6.5 f	1:16.01	$68,750
2019	Built to Suit	5	Manny Franco	Chad Brown	Klaravich Stables & William Lawrence	6.5 f	1:15.88	$82,500
2018	Runaway Lute	4	Javier Castellano	Gary C. Contessa	Harold Lerner LLC & Nehoc Stables	6.5 f	1:15.70	$90,000
2017	Ostrolenka	5	Joe Bravo	David Jacobson	David Jacobson	6.5 f	1:16.75	$90,000
2016	Breakin the Fever	4	Nazario Alvarado	Debra A. Breed	Debra A. Breed	6.5 f	1:16.97	$90,000
2015	Palace	6	Cornelio Velásquez	Linda L. Rice	Antonino Miuccio	6.5 f	1:15.68	$90,000
2014	Moonlight Song	7	Joel Rosario	Charlton A. Baker	Albert Fried Jr.	6.5 f	1:15.58	$90,000
2013	Palace	4	Cornelio Velásquez	Linda L. Rice	Antonino Miuccio	6 f	1:08.97	$90,000
2012	Mine Over Matter	5	Ramon Domínguez	Michael E. Hushion	Chester & Mary Broman Sr.	6 f	1:10.20	$90,000
2011	General Maximus	4	Corey Nakatani	John P. Terranova II	Goldmark Farm, Michael Imperio, Elizabeth Loftus	6 f	1:09.58	$75,000
2010	General Maximus	3	Javier Castellano	John P. Terranova II	Goldmark Farm, Michael Imperio, Elizabeth Loftus	6 f	1:08.84	$75,000
2009	Driven by Success	4	Ramon Domínguez	Bruce N. Levine	Repole Stable	6 f	1:10.51	$75,000
2008	Stormin Normandy	4	Edgar Prado	Richard E. Dutrow Jr.	IEAH Stables, Andrew I. Cohen, Holdings Group Stables	6 f	1:09.18	$75,000
2007	Ferocious Fires	4	Rafael Bejarano	Richard E. Dutrow Jr.	IEAH Stables	6 f	1:09.41	$75,000
2006	Gold and Roses	4	Garrett K. Gomez	Thomas M. Bush	Henry Gregory	6 f	1:09.37	$75,000
2005	Friendly Island	4	John R. Velazquez	Todd A. Pletcher	Anstu Stables, Inc. (Stuart Subotnick)	6 f	1:10.20	$75,000
2004	Friendly Island	3	John R. Velazquez	Todd A. Pletcher	Anstu Stables, Inc. (Stuart Subotnick)	6 f	1:09.40	$75,000
2003	align=center	4	Shaun Bridgmohan	Jonathan B. Buckley	D and B Stable	6 f	1:10.20	$75,000
2002	Well Fancied	4	John R. Velazquez	Richard E. Dutrow Jr.	Sanford Goldfarb et al.	6 f	1:09.80	$75,000
2001	Impeachthepro	4	John Grabowski	M. Anthony Ferraro	Nicholas Laneve	6 f	1:10.20	$75,000
2000	Stalwart Member	7	Jorge F. Chavez	Cleveland Johnson	Sanford Goldfarb	6 f	1:09.40	$75,000
1999	Pooska Hill	4	Jose L. Espinoza	Patrick E. Myer	Timothy Ahern	6 f	1:09.60	$75,000
1998	Mr. Buffum	3	Aaron Gryder	Gasper S. Moschera	Barbara J. Davis	6 f	1:09.60	$75,000
1997	Wire Me Collect	4	Richard Migliore	Robert W. Camac	Arthur I. Appleton	6 f	1:08.60	$75,000
1996	Terrorist	5	Julie Krone	David G. Donk	Releib Stable	6 f	1:09.60	$75,000
1995	Corma Ray	5	Jorge F. Chavez	Timothy A. Hills	Raymond L. Simoneau	6 f	1:09.80	$75,000
1994	Corma Ray	4	Mike E. Smith	Timothy A. Hills	Raymond L. Simoneau	6 f	1:11.00	$45,000
1993	Preporant	4	Robbie Davis	Bruce Johnstone	Milton Ritzenberg	7 f	1:21.40	$41,760
1992	Argyle Lake	6	Herb McCauley	Peter R. Ferriola	James Riccio	7 f	1:24.40	$54,900
1991	D'Parrot	4	Jose A. Santos	Richard Schosberg	Heatherwood Farm (Margot I. Perkins)	7 f	1:22.00	$52,830
1990	Zee Best	4	Karen Rogers	James J. Pascuma Jr.	Fran-Jay Stable	7 f	1:22.60	$55,800
1989	Scottish Monk	6	Jerry D. Bailey	John J. Lenzini Jr.	Cedar Valle Stable	7 f	1:22.40	$55,350
1988	Tinchen's Prince	5	Randy Romero	Richard T. DeStasio	Albert Fried Jr.	8.5 f	1:41.20	$51,570
1987	Easy N' Dirty	4	Robbie Davis	Paulino Ortiz	Paulino Ortiz	8.5 f	1:42.00	$42,540
1986	Fearless Teddy	4	Kenny Skinner	Laure Connelly	Laure Connelly	8.5 f	1:41.40	$41,640
1985	Mugatea	5	Jorge Velásquez	John O. Hertler	Elsa Hoffman	8.5 f	1:43.00	$42,780
1984	Restless Feet	3	Eddie Maple	Thomas M. Waller	Tanrackin Farm (Wilhelmine Stewart & Kirby Waller)	8.5 f	1:41.80	$42,900
1983	Sir Keys	3	Jorge Velásquez	John M. Gaver Jr.	Goldmills Farm (William A. Levin)	8.5 f	1:41.80	$33,000
1982	Shy Groom	3	Laffit Pincay Jr.	Stephen A. DiMauro	Dogwood Stable	8 f	1:35.40	$32,400
1981	Newsman	5	Jorge Velásquez	Thomas J. Kelly	Ardboe Stable (Patricia L. Moseley)	8 f	1:36.60	$32,820
1980	Fio Rito	5	Leslie Hulet	Michael S. Ferraro	Ray Lacesse	8 f	1:36.80	$33,300
1979	Dedicated Rullah	3	Ruben Hernandez	Ramon M. Hernandez	Assunta Louis Farm (Dr. Dominick J. DeLuke)	8 f	1:37.00	$25,890
1978	Wandering Cloud	3	Antonio Graell	Thomas M. Waller	Tanrackin Farm (Wilhelmine Stewart & Kirby Waller)	8 f	1:37.40	$42,625
