= Maker's Mark Mile Stakes =

- Class: Grade 1
- Location: Keeneland Race Course; Lexington, Kentucky, United States
- Inaugurated: 1989 (as Fort Harrod Stakes)
- Race type: Thoroughbred – Flat racing
- Website: www.keeneland.com

Race information
- Distance: 1 mile (8 furlongs)
- Surface: Turf
- Track: Left-handed
- Qualification: Four-year-olds & up
- Weight: 123 lbs with allowances
- Purse: US$600,000

The Maker's Mark Mile Stakes is a Grade I American Thoroughbred horse race for horses age four years old and older over a distance of one mile on the turf held annually in early April at Keeneland Race Course, Lexington, Kentucky during the spring meeting.

== History ==
The event was inaugurated as the Fort Harrod Stakes on 13 April 1989 and was run over distance of about 1 1/16 miles the won by the seven year old Yankee Affair who set a course record in winning the event in a time of 1:43 3/5. The following year the event was decreased to the current distance of one mile.

The Fort Harrod Stakes was named after the fort which was named after James Harrod, who led an early party of settlers into Kentucky in the 1770s.

In 1997 the Maker's Mark distillery located not far from Lexington, began their sponsorship of the event and Keeneland's administration renamed the event to the Maker's Mark Mile Stakes. In 2010 the event was once again renamed to a bourbon distilled by Maker's Mark – Maker's 46 Mile Stakes.

The event was classified a Grade III in 1991 and was upgraded to Grade II race in 2000. In 2008 the event reached as a Grade I status confirming the quality that had competed in previous years and continues to attract.

Several class horses who have won this event in the spring have continued to prove their dominance. The 1991 winner, Opening Verse continued on to win the Breeders' Cup Mile that year. Several others including Artie Schiller in 2005, 2006 US Champion Male Turf Horse Miesque's Approval and Kip Deville in 2007 have also performed this feat. Twice American Horse of the Year (2012, 2013) Wise Dan also won Breeders' Cup Mile in 2013 and also captured this event the following year for the second time.

Miss Temple City is the only mare to have won this event in 2016.

== Records ==
Speed record

- 1:33.46 – Chez Pierre (FR) (2023)

Margins

- 2 3/4 lengths – Get Stormy (2011)

Most wins

- 2 – Wise Dan (2013, 2014)
- 2 – Kip Deville (2007, 2008)

Most wins by a jockey

- 4 – Javier Castellano (2011, 2015, 2017, 2019)

Most wins by an owner

- 2 – Allen E. Paulson (1991, 1993)
- 2 – Gainsborough Farm (1999, 2002)
- 2 – IEAH Stables, Pegasus Holding Group Stables, J. Roberts & A. & S. Cohen (2007, 2008)
- 2 – Morton Fink (2013, 2014)
- 2 – Gary Barber (2018, 2020)
- 2 – Charles E. Fipke (2004, 2022)

Most wins by a trainer

- 3 – Roger L. Attfield (1992, 2004, 2022)
- 3 - Chad C. Brown (2021, 2025, 2026)

== Winners ==
Year	Winner	Age	Jockey	Trainer	Owner	Distance	Time	Purse	Grade	Ref
Maker's Mark Mile Stakes
2026	Zulu Kingdom (IRE)	4	Flavien Prat	Chad C. Brown	Madaket Stables , Michael Dubb, William Strauss & Michael J. Caruso	1 mile	1:34.90	$506,263	I	
2025	Carl Spackler (IRE)	5	Flavien Prat	Chad C. Brown	e Five Racing Thoroughbreds	1 mile	1:36.56	$552,013	I	
2024	Master of The Seas	6	William Buick	Charlie Appleby	Godolphin	1 mile	1:37.10	$517,775	I	
2023	Chez Pierre (FR)	5	Flavien Prat	Arnaud Delacour	Lael Stables	1 mile	1:33.46	$518,575	I	
2022	Shirl's Speight	5	Luis Saez	Roger L. Attfield	Charles E. Fipke	1 mile	1:35.93	$577,000	I	
2021	Raging Bull (FR)	6	Irad Ortiz Jr.	Chad C. Brown	Peter M. Brant	1 mile	1:33.86	$300,000	I	
2020	War of Will	4	Tyler Gaffalione	Mark E. Casse	Gary Barber	1 mile	1:34.55	$300,000	I	
Maker's 46 Mile Stakes
2019	Delta Prince	6	Javier Castellano	James A. Jerkens	Stronach Stables	1 mile	1:35.97	$300,000	I	
2018	Heart to Heart (CAN)	7	Julien R. Leparoux	Brian A. Lynch	Terry Hamilton	1 mile	1:34.71	$300,000	I	
2017	American Patriot	4	Javier Castellano	Todd A. Pletcher	WinStar Farm	1 mile	1:34.70	$300,000	I	
2016	† Miss Temple City	4	Drayden Van Dyke	H. Graham Motion	Sagamore Farm, The Club Racing & Needle In A Haystack	1 mile	1:34.09	$300,000	I	
2015	Jack Milton	5	Javier Castellano	Todd A. Pletcher	Gary Barber	1 mile	1:36.30	$300,000	I	
2014	Wise Dan	7	John R. Velazquez	Charles LoPresti	Morton Fink	1 mile	1:34.91	$300,000	I	
2013	Wise Dan	6	Jose Lezcano	Charles LoPresti	Morton Fink	1 mile	1:36.37	$300,000	I	
2012	Data Link	4	Alex O. Solis	Claude R. McGaughey III	Stuart S. Janney III	1 mile	1:34.31	$300,000	I	
Maker's Mark Mile Stakes
2011	Get Stormy	5	Javier Castellano	Thomas M. Bush	Sullimar Stable	1 mile	1:37.31	$300,000	I	
2010	Karelian	8	Julien R. Leparoux	George R. Arnold II	Green Lantern Stables	1 mile	1:34.33	$300,000	I	
2009	Mr. Sidney	5	Kent J. Desormeaux	William I. Mott	Circle E Racing	1 mile	1:41.84	$300,000	I	
2008	Kip Deville	5	Cornelio Velásquez	Richard E. Dutrow Jr.	IEAH Stables, Pegasus Holding Group Stables, J. Roberts & A. & S. Cohen	1 mile	1:36.78	$300,000	I	
2007	Kip Deville	4	Edgar S. Prado	Richard E. Dutrow Jr.	IEAH Stables, Pegasus Holding Group Stables, J. Roberts & A. & S. Cohen	1 mile	1:35.51	$250,000	II	
2006	Miesque's Approval	7	Eddie Castro	Martin D. Wolfson	Live Oak Plantation	1 mile	1:34.06	$250,000	II	
2005	Artie Schiller	4	Edgar S. Prado	James A. Jerkens	Timber Bay Farm & Mrs. Thomas J. Walsh	1 mile	1:34.09	$250,000	II	
2004	Perfect Soul (IRE)	6	Edgar S. Prado	Roger L. Attfield	Charles E. Fipke	1 mile	1:33.54	$200,000	II	
2003	Royal Spy	5	Robby Albarado	Thomas M. Amoss	Dr. K. K. Jayaraman & Dr. V. Devi Jayaraman	1 mile	1:35.82	$200,000	II	
2002	Touch of the Blues (FR)	5	Kent J. Desormeaux	Neil D. Drysdale	Gainsborough Farm	1 mile	1:35.02	$200,000	II	
2001	North East Bound	5	José A. Vélez Jr.	William W. Perry	Julian DeMarco & Richard J. DiSano	1 mile	1:34.44	$226,600	II	
2000	Conserve	4	Shane Sellers	Frank L. Brothers	Claiborne Farm	1 mile	1:35.00	$170,850	II	
1999	Soviet Line (IRE)	9	John R. Velazquez	Mark A. Hennig	Gainsborough Farm	1 mile	1:35.20	$110,800	III	
1998	Lasting Approval	4	Robby Albarado	Diane L. Perkins	Wimborne Farm	1 mile	1:35.40	$113,000	III	
1997	Influent	6	Jean-Luc Samyn	Howard M. Tesher	Richard Kumble & Michael Becker	1 mile	1:34.40	$112,800	III	
Fort Harrod Stakes
1996	Tejano Run	4	Jerry D. Bailey	Kenneth G. McPeek	Roy K. Monroe	1 mile	1:35.00	$113,900	III	
1995	Dove Hunt	4	José A. Santos	Neil J. Howard	William S. Farish III	1 mile	1:35.80	$85,800	III	
1994	First and Only	7	Tracy J. Hebert	Walter M. Bindner Jr.	Mason Rudd	1 mile	1:36.60	$81,750	III	
1993	Ganges	5	Jerry D. Bailey	William I. Mott	Allen E. Paulson	1 mile	1:35.40	$85,050	III	
1992	Shudanz (CAN)	4	Craig Perret	Roger L. Attfield	Kinghaven Farms & R. Richardson	1 mile	1:36.40	$85,050	III	
1991	Opening Verse	5	Jerry D. Bailey	Richard J. Lundy	Allen E. Paulson	1 mile	1:36.00	$81,750	III	
1990	Charlie Barley	4	Robin Platts	Grant D. Pearce	King Caledon Farms	1 mile	1:35.80	$56,600		
1989	Yankee Affair	7	Randy Romero	Henry L. Campbell	Ju Ju Gen Stable	abt. 1 1/16 miles	1:43.60	$56,450		

Notes:
† Filly or Mare

== See also ==
- List of American and Canadian Graded races
