= Icabad Crane =

American-bred Thoroughbred racehorse

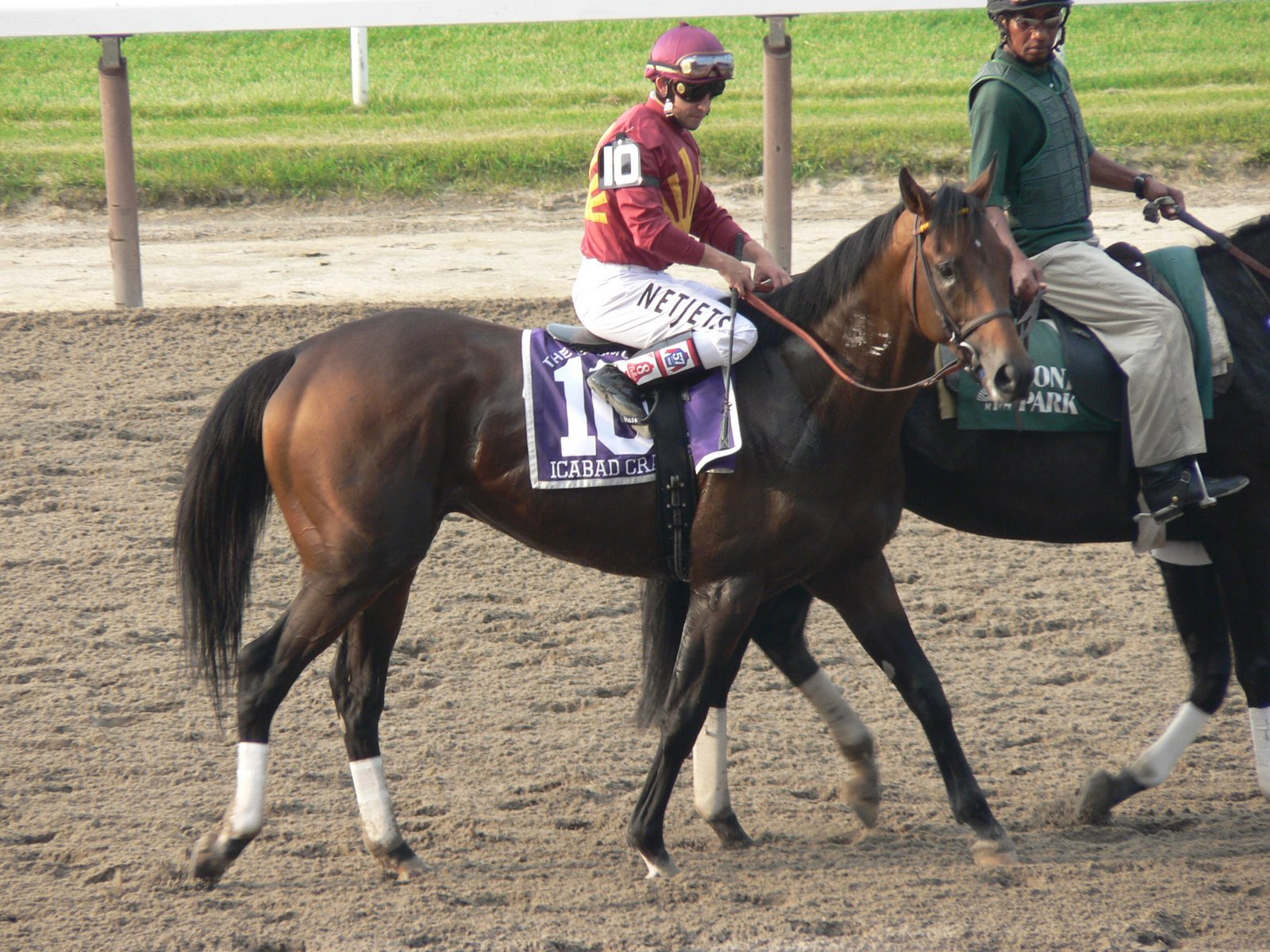
- 2008 Belmont Stakes
- Sire: Jump Start
- Grandsire: A.P. Indy
- Dam: Adorahy
- Damsire: Rahy
- Sex: Gelding
- Foaled: 2005
- Country: United States
- Colour: Dark Bay/Brown
- Breeder: Gallagher's Stud
- Owner: Earle I. Mack
- Trainer: H. Graham Motion
- Record: 31: 7-8-9
- Earnings: US$ 583,895

Major wins
- Federico Tesio Stakes (2008); Kings Point Handicap (2010); Alex M. Robb Stakes (2010); G'day Mate Stakes (2011); Evan Shipman Handicap (2011)

Icabad Crane (foaled April 9, 2005, in New York) is an American Thoroughbred racehorse by Jump Start out of Adorahy. In February 2007, he was purchased as a two-year-old at the Ocala Breeders Sale for $110,000.

Icabad Crane is consistent, finishing in the money in 23 out of his 29 starts for his trainer H. Graham Motion.

== Racing career ==
=== 2008: three-year-old season ===
In his three-year-old season, Icabad Crane placed third in the Rushaway Stakes at Turfway Park in March, then won the 2008 Federico Tesio Stakes at Pimlico Race Course in April.

His connections entered him in the 2008 Preakness Stakes, where he started in post position 3. Icabad Crane broke well and settled along the inside passing the stands for the first time. He commenced a strong rail run going into the far turn but was taken up and steadied by his jockey, Jeremy Rose, when a hole closed up on him. At that point, he lacked room to continue his run on the inside. Angling out near the quarter pole, he split horses in the upper stretch and closed late to finish third to dual classic winner Big Brown and Grade I winner Macho Again. Icabad Crane earned $110,000 and paid $5.60 on a $2.00 show ticket.

Later that year, he placed second in the Itaka Stakes and Alex M. Robb Handicap, both run at Aqueduct Racetrack.

=== 2009: four-year-old season ===
In his four-year-old season, he placed in several allowance races and smaller ungraded stakes races.

=== 2010: five-year-old season ===
As a five-year-old, in March 2010, Icabad Crane won the Kings Point Handicap at Aqueduct Racetrack at one and one eighth miles on the dirt in 1:50. He then ran on the turf in the West Point Stakes at Saratoga over one and one eighth miles, finished third. He next finished second to Grade I winning Giant Moon by a neck in the July 26, 2010, Evan Shipman Handicap at 1-1/8 miles on the dirt at Saratoga Race Course. He followed that up with another second place finish on October 23, 2010, at Belmont in the Empire Classic Stakes at 1 1/8 miles on the dirt. On Thanksgiving Day, November 25, 2010 Icabad Crane finished second again in the Tinchen's Prince Stakes at one mile on the dirt at Aqueduct. In the final start of his four-year-old season, he won the Alex M. Robb Stakes over Aqueduct’s inner track on New Year's Eve, December 31, 2010. He took off the rail at the three-sixteenths pole and ran down Giant Moon and Manteca in the final 70 yards. Icabad Crane covered the 1-1/16 miles in 1:44.48 and returned $4.90 as the favorite.

=== 2011: six-year-old season ===
At age six, Icabad Crane won the February 17, 2011, G'day Mate Stakes at a mile and seventy yards on the Inner Dirt Track at Aqueduct Racetrack over a field of six in 1:43.63 by 2-1/4 lengths as the favorite. In May 2011, on the Preakness Stakes undercard, he ran in the grade three $100,000 William Donald Schaefer Handicap at one and one sixteenth miles at Pimlico Race Course on conventional dirt. In that race, Icabad Crane rallied late and came in third to four-time stakes winner Apart, who won by a neck. On July 3, 2011, Icabad Crane raced in the grade two Suburban Handicap and finished sixth. On July 25, 2011, he won the $75,000 Evan Shipman Handicap at Saratoga Race Course finishing the mile and one eighth in 1:51.42. On December 31, 2011 he finished second to Spa City Fever in the Alex M. Robb Stakes at a mile and one sixteenth at Aqueduct Racetrack.

Overall, Icabad Crane has been either first or second in half his starts. He has been in the money in 24 out of 30 starts and has earned $580,895.

=== 2013: eight-year-old season ===
Kentucky Derby-winning trainer Graham Motion and his wife, Anita retired Icabad Crane at the age of 8. From 33 starts during his racing career, he had 7 wins, 7 seconds and 9 thirds, with total earnings of $585,980.

=== Post Racing Career ===
Herringswell Stables partnered with Phillip Dutton Eventing to show what retired race horses can do in new careers, and Icabad Crane entered into training with Phillip Dutton to become a three-day eventing athlete.

After being entered in the 2014 Thoroughbred Makeover Challenge, Icabad Crane and Mr. Dutton won the title as America's Most Wanted Thoroughbred in the discipline of eventing.
