= Big Brown (horse) =

American-bred Thoroughbred racehorse

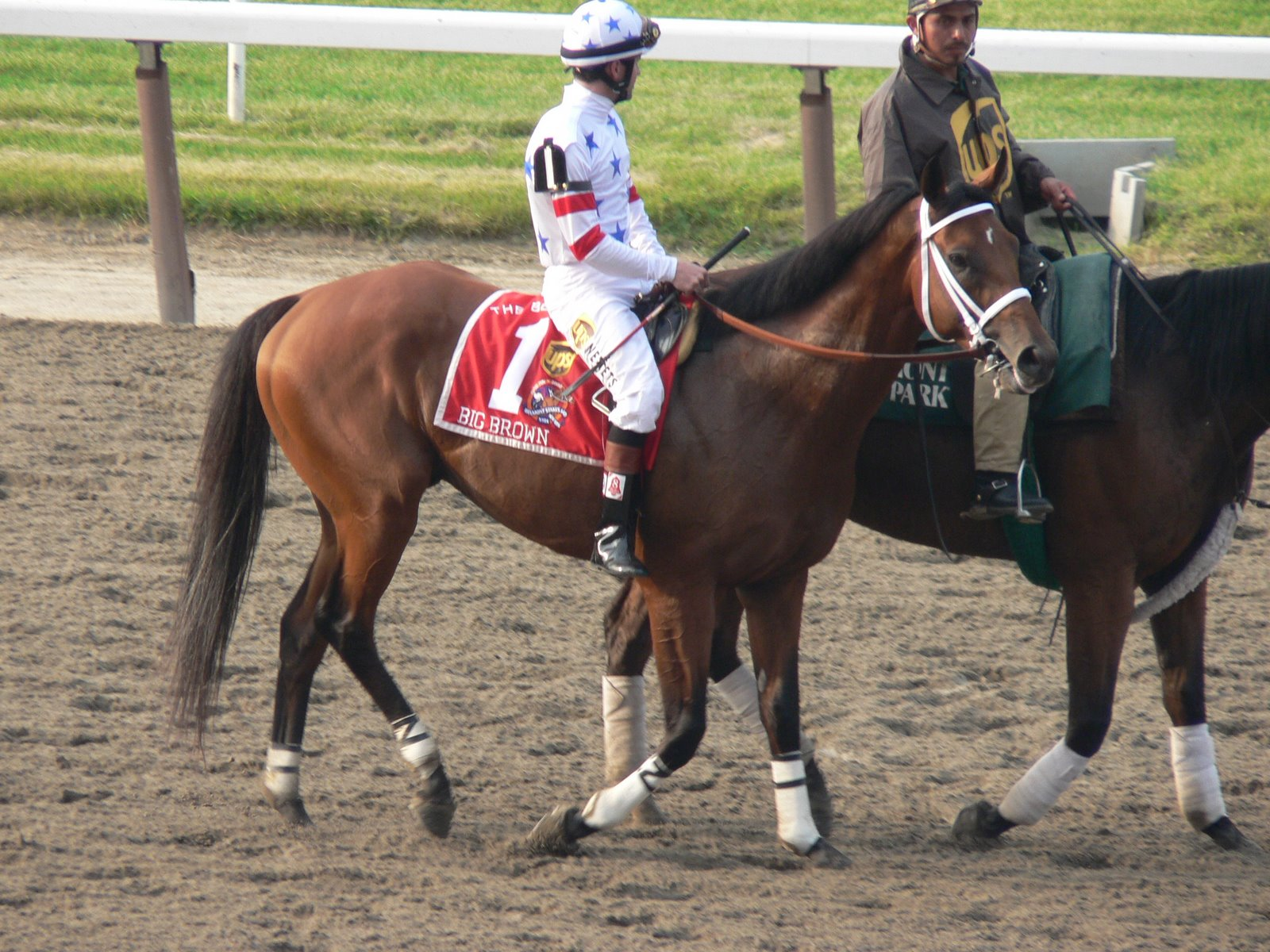
- Big Brown and Kent Desormeaux head into the gate for the 2008 Belmont Stakes.
- Sire: Boundary
- Grandsire: Danzig
- Dam: Mien
- Damsire: Nureyev
- Sex: Stallion
- Foaled: 2005
- Country: United States
- Color: Bay
- Breeder: Monticule Farms
- Owner: IEAH Stables & Michael Iavarone
- Trainer: 1) Patrick Reynolds; 2) Richard E. Dutrow, Jr. (2007–2008)
- Record: 8: 7-0-0
- Earnings: $3,614,500

Major wins
- Florida Derby (2008); Haskell Invitational Handicap (2008); Monmouth Stakes (2008) Triple Crown race wins: Kentucky Derby (2008); Preakness Stakes (2008)

Awards
- American Champion Three-Year-Old Male Horse (2008)

Big Brown (foaled April 10, 2005) is an American Thoroughbred racehorse who won the 2008 Kentucky Derby and 2008 Preakness Stakes and was the 2008 Champion Three-Year-Old.

== Background ==
Big Brown was bred by Dr. Gary B. Knapp's Monticule Farms in Lexington, Kentucky. He was sired by Grade III winner Boundary, a son of North American Champion sire Danzig, who was a son of Northern Dancer. Big Brown's dam was Mien, also a granddaughter of Northern Dancer through her sire, Nureyev.

Big Brown was first sold for $60,000 at the Fasig-Tipton 2006 Fall Yearling Sale. He was then sold again at the Keeneland Sales 2007 April Two-Year-Olds in Training Sale to Brooklyn trucking company owner Paul Pompa, Jr. for $190,000. Pompa named the colt in honor of the United Parcel Service (UPS), popularly nicknamed Big Brown. Pompa turned him over to trainer Patrick Reynolds for race conditioning.

== Racing career ==
=== 2007: Two-year-old season ===
Ridden by Jeremy Rose, the colt made his two-year-old racing debut on September 3, 2007, at Saratoga Race Course in Saratoga Springs, New York on the turf, winning by 11 1/4 lengths. Pompa then sold an interest in Big Brown to IEAH Stables, a subsidiary of International Equine Acquisitions Holdings, Inc., whose stated purpose is to create and manage an Equity Horse Fund, which operates as a hedge fund. The new partnership sent the horse to the Palm Meadows Thoroughbred Training Center in South Florida under the care of new trainer Rick Dutrow.

Soon afterwards, quarter cracks were discovered in both of Big Brown's front feet, sidelining the colt for several months.

=== 2008: Three-year-old season ===
Unraced for more than six months, Big Brown debuted as a three-year-old on March 5, 2008, with a 12 3/4 length win in an allowance race at Gulfstream Park. He was ridden by Hall of Fame jockey Kent Desormeaux.

Entered in the Grade 1 Florida Derby on March 29, Big Brown drew the outside post position in a field of twelve. Despite the unfavorable post, he was made the 3-2 favorite. Desormeaux sent the horse to the lead with fast opening fractions and was never challenged: Big Brown won by five lengths. The final time of 1:48.16 was just 0.37 seconds off the dirt track record set by Brass Hat in 2006. Such an impressive performance by a lightly raced horse led Big Brown to be called a "freakish colt". Desormeaux said. "Riding him was like bounding through a meadow. He just galloped around. When a horse sets fractions like that and still tells me that he's got more, and that the other horses can't get to him, that's something special. He's a major talent; possibly the best horse I've ridden."

==== Kentucky Derby ====
On May 3, 2008, in just his fourth race, Big Brown was the 2–1 favorite in the 2008 Kentucky Derby. He started from the far outside post position 20, but neither that, nor his lack of experience seemed to be a problem. At the break, Desormeaux did not push Big Brown, concentrating instead on getting good position on the first turn while settling instead behind the leaders. "He was just galloping, floppy-eared, off the bridle, cruising," said Desormeaux. On the far turn, Desormeaux urged the horse and Big Brown responded with a burst of speed that swept him to the lead. He won by 4 3/4 lengths over filly Eight Belles, who was euthanised after breaking both front fetlocks during the post-race cool-down. The last horse to win the Kentucky Derby from post position 20 was Clyde Van Dusen in 1929. Big Brown became the seventh horse to win the race undefeated. The time for the 1 1/4-mile race was 2:01.92. The official Beyer Speed Figure for the race was 109. He became the first horse since Regret in 1915 to win the race with three or fewer starts.

In the days leading up to the Preakness, Dutrow admitted that he had Winstrol (stanozolol), an anabolic steroid, administered to his horses on the 15th of every month. However, Dutrow stated to ESPN that Big Brown did not receive the May 15 shot. At the time, stanozolol was banned in 10 states but not in any of the states where the Triple Crown races were held. Dutrow also talked about the administration of a "jug", which the veterinarian described as an electrolyte solution designed to rehydrate the horse.

==== Preakness Stakes ====
On May 17, Big Brown was the 1-5 favorite in a field of twelve for the 2008 Preakness Stakes; only one of his rivals had raced in the Kentucky Derby. Big Brown broke well and settled behind the pace on the inside around the first turn. Down the backstretch, Desormeaux eased him to the outside and he ranged up beside the leaders. As they entered the stretch, Big Brown put in a burst of speed to rapidly distance himself from the field, winning by 5 1/4 lengths over Macho Again. He became the fourth horse to win both the Derby and the Preakness while remaining undefeated. The final time of the 1 3/16 mile race was 1:54.80. "He just keeps on getting better and keeps on getting stronger," said Dutrow. "He is special."

==== Belmont Stakes ====
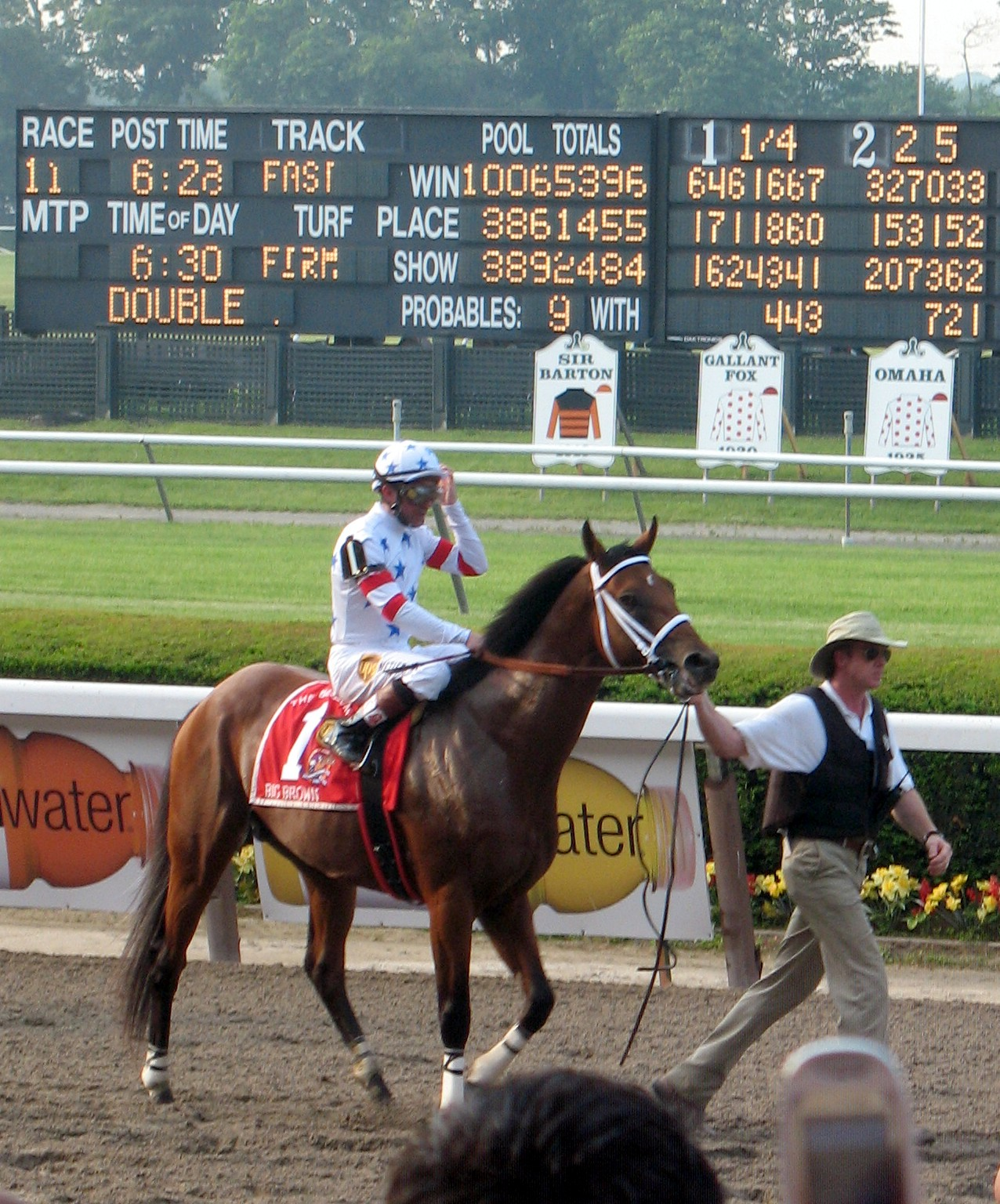
Big Brown heads toward the starting gate at Belmont Park.

On the Friday following the Preakness, a three-inch quarter crack was discovered on the horse's left front hoof, the same injury that he experienced in both of his front hooves the previous fall. With Dutrow referring to the injury as "just a little hiccup" and with the crack stitched together with steel wire, Big Brown resumed jogging at Belmont the following Tuesday.

For the Belmont Stakes, Big Brown wore a second set of stainless steel sutures on the inside of his hoof. Hoof specialist Ian McKinlay changed the sutures a week before the race and attached an acrylic and fiberglass adhesive patch to the hoof. Although Big Brown missed three days of training prior to the race, his gait and attitude seemed unaffected. After the crack was patched, Brown was exercised by rider Michelle Nevin. Ian McKinlay said, prior to the Belmont, that Big Brown "does not need a patch on the quarter crack on his left front hoof until the morning of the Belmont Stakes. So Dutrow will give Big Brown his final hard workout Tuesday to breeze five furlongs without it and gallop him into the race confident the colt's tender hoof is healed."

Big Brown went off as the 3-10 favorite in the Belmont. He was rank in the early stages of the race and nearly ran up on the heels of eventual winner Da' Tara. Then Desormeaux tried to swing Big Brown to the outside during the first turn and bumped into Tale of Ekati. He was urged in mid-stretch but failed to respond, stopping as he came around the final turn. Da' Tara won the race by 5 1/4 lengths while Big Brown was eased, becoming the first Triple Crown hopeful to fail to finish the Belmont. Kent Desormeaux pulled the horse up in the homestretch, later saying something was amiss and stating immediately after the race, "I had no horse," although no physical abnormality was ever found. Billy Turner, the trainer of Seattle Slew, later stated, "If Desormeaux had pulled up a horse like that in my day, the stewards would have run you out of the state and told you to never come back." Two weeks after the Belmont, a picture revealed a dislodged shoe on Big Brown's right hind leg that could have been the cause of his poor performance. The shoe might have come loose during the race and gotten pushed back in while he was running.

Sportswriter Steve Haskin would write:

The one agonizing aspect of the Belmont is the mystery surrounding Big Brown's performance. We've heard many theories, and that is what they will remain. No one will ever know for sure why a horse that personified perfection suddenly came apart at the seams. Was it the deep track, the stifling heat, getting rank early in the race, the traffic and bumping going into the first turn, acting up in the holding barn, missing four days of training, possibly being dehydrated, sweating between his legs and not much on his body, breaking awkwardly, possibly getting spooked by the starter in a blue jacket and white pants standing right on the racetrack,? It likely was a combination of occurrences that led to his shocking performance.

==== Later three-year-old season ====
Big Brown returned to racing on August 3, 2008, with a win in the $1 million Haskell Invitational Handicap at Monmouth Park. He took the lead out of the gate and was passed by Coal Play rounding the final turn. It looked as if Coal Play was going to pull off an upset, but Big Brown passed him in the final strides to win by 1 3/4 lengths. He earned a Beyer Speed Figure of 107 for his win.

Big Brown won his next start in the Monmouth Stakes on September 13 in preparation for the Breeders' Cup Classic. It was his first start on grass since breaking his maiden in 2007 and his first start against older horses. Breaking quickly from post 4, Big Brown opened a sizable lead down the backstretch. The field began to catch up to him entering the far turn, and as Proudinsky edged up to him, Big Brown dug in and held on for a neck victory.

== Stud career ==
While working out with stablemate Kip Deville on October 13, Big Brown sustained an injury to a hind hoof and was declared out of the Breeders' Cup Classic, and retired.

He was awarded the Eclipse Award as American Champion Three-Year-Old Male Horse for 2008.

Beginning in 2009, Big Brown stood at stud at Three Chimneys Farm in Midway, Kentucky. He was bred to more than 100 mares his first season, including 71 stakes mares or stakes producers. The first reported foal for Big Brown was a filly out of Impressive Attire (by Seeking the Gold) born on January 12, 2010, at Swifty Farms in Seymour, Indiana.

In 2014, Andrew Cohen's Sunrise Stables and Gary Tolchin's Golden Goose Enterprises obtained a majority interest in Big Brown and announced that he would be relocated to New York for the 2015 season with a fee of $8,500. Standing at Dutchess Views Farm in Pine Plains, New York, his 2016 fee increased to $10,000.

Big Brown has proved to be a successful sire. His most notable offspring include Dortmund, who won the 2015 Santa Anita Derby and finished third in the Kentucky Derby, behind Triple Crown winner American Pharoah, and Somelikeithotbrown, who won the Grade 2 Bernard Baruch Handicap in 2020 and the Grade 2 Dinner Party Stakes in 2021. Big Brown is the damsire of Mage, winner of the 2023 Kentucky Derby, and of Dornoch, winner of the 2024 Belmont Stakes.

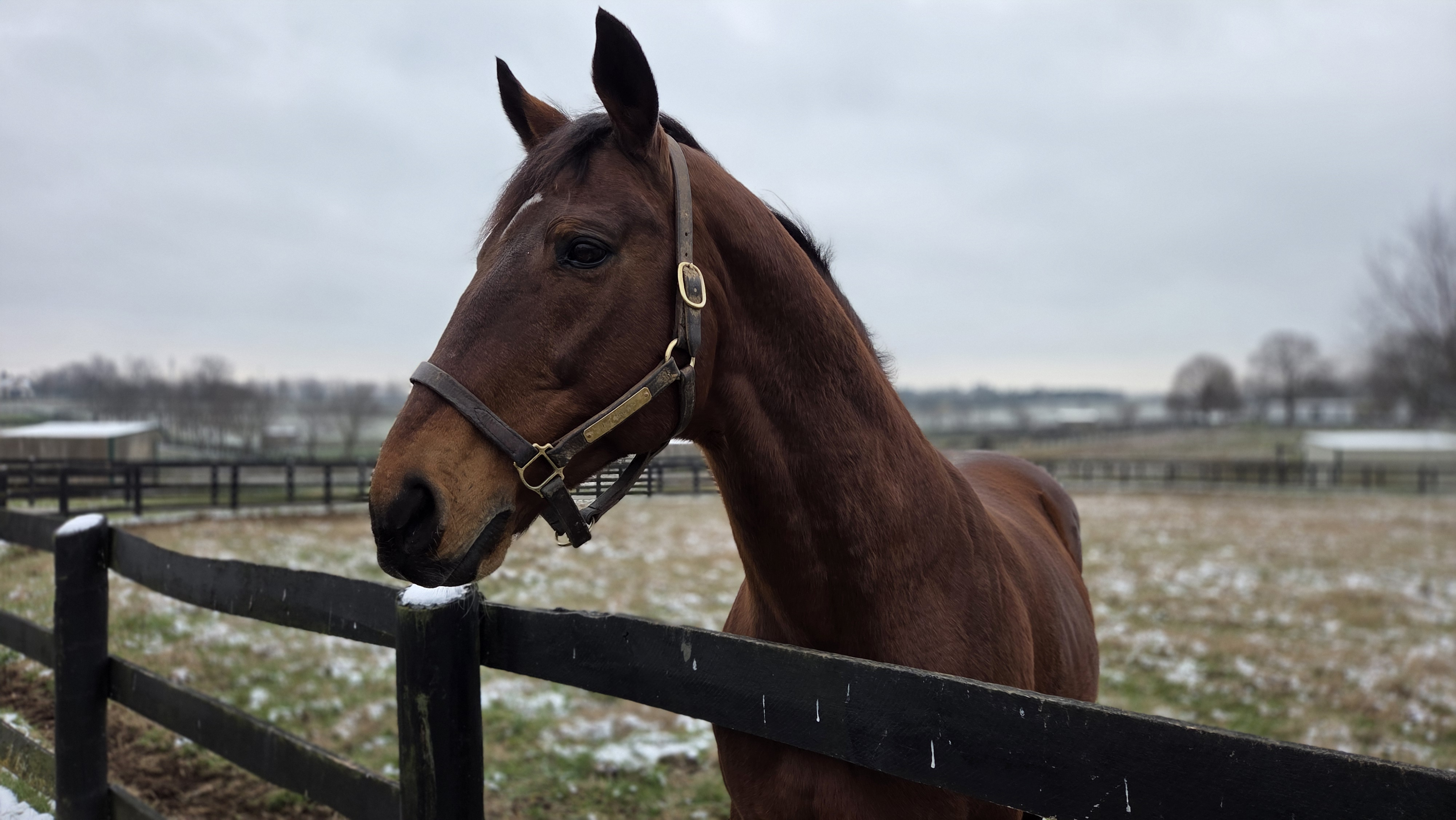
Big Brown at Old Friends Equine retirement farm in Georgetown, Kentucky, December 6, 2025.

On September 27, 2024, Big Brown Syndicate's Andy Cohen accompanied Big Brown at Old Friends Equine, where he will live out his days as the fifth Kentucky Derby and Preakness Stakes winner to be retired there.

== Race record ==
Finish	Race	Distance	Jockey	Time	Victory Margin (in lengths)	Runner up	Track	Surface	Date
1st	Maiden	1 1/16 mi	Jeremy Rose	1:40.33	11 1/4	Dr. Cal	Saratoga Race Course	Turf	9/3/07
1st	Allowance	1 mi	Kent Desormeaux	1:35.66	12	Heaven's Awesome	Gulfstream Park	Dirt	3/5/08
1st	Florida Derby	1 1/8 mi	Kent Desormeaux	1:48.16	5	Smooth Air	Gulfstream Park	Dirt	3/29/08
1st	Kentucky Derby	1 1/4 mi	Kent Desormeaux	2:01.82	4 3/4	Eight Belles	Churchill Downs	Dirt	5/3/08
1st	Preakness	1 3/16 mi	Kent Desormeaux	1:54.80	5 1/4	Macho Again	Pimlico Race Course	Dirt	5/17/08
DNF, eased	Belmont Stakes	1 1/2 mi	Kent Desormeaux	N/A	N/A	Da' Tara (1st)	Belmont Park	Dirt	6/7/08
1st	Haskell Invitational	1 1/8 mi	Kent Desormeaux	1:48.31	1 3/4	Coal Play	Monmouth Park	Dirt	8/3/08
1st	Monmouth Stakes	1 1/8 mi	Kent Desormeaux	1:47.41	1/2	Proudinsky	Monmouth Park	Turf	9/13/08

== Pedigree ==
Pedigree of Big Brown (USA), bay stallion, 2005
Sire Boundary B. 1990	Danzig B. 1977	Northern Dancer*	Nearctic*
Sire Boundary B. 1990	Danzig B. 1977	Northern Dancer*	Natalma*
Sire Boundary B. 1990	Danzig B. 1977	Pas de Nom	Admiral's Voyage
Sire Boundary B. 1990	Danzig B. 1977	Pas de Nom	Petitioner
Sire Boundary B. 1990	Edge Ch. 1978	Damascus*	Sword Dancer
Sire Boundary B. 1990	Edge Ch. 1978	Damascus*	Kerala
Sire Boundary B. 1990	Edge Ch. 1978	Ponte Vecchio	Round Table
Sire Boundary B. 1990	Edge Ch. 1978	Ponte Vecchio	Terentia
Dam Mien B. 1999	Nureyev B. 1977	Northern Dancer*	Nearctic*
Dam Mien B. 1999	Nureyev B. 1977	Northern Dancer*	Natalma*
Dam Mien B. 1999	Nureyev B. 1977	Special	Forli
Dam Mien B. 1999	Nureyev B. 1977	Special	Thong
Dam Mien B. 1999	Miasma B. 1992	Lear Fan	Roberto
Dam Mien B. 1999	Miasma B. 1992	Lear Fan	Wac
Dam Mien B. 1999	Miasma B. 1992	Syrian Circle	Damascus*
Dam Mien B. 1999	Miasma B. 1992	Syrian Circle	Friendly Circle (family 5-h)

- Big Brown is inbred 3s × 3d to the stallion Northern Dancer, meaning that he appears third generation on the sire side of his pedigree and third generation on the dam side of his pedigree. Big Brown is also inbred 3s × 4d to Damascus, meaning he appears third generation on the sire side of his pedigree and fourth generation on the dam side of his pedigree

== See also ==
- List of leading Thoroughbred racehorses
- List of racehorses
