= Pyro (horse) =

American-bred Thoroughbred racehorse

- Sire: Pulpit
- Grandsire: A.P. Indy
- Dam: Wild Vision
- Damsire: Wild Again
- Sex: Colt
- Foaled: 2005
- Country: United States
- Colour: Dark Bay
- Breeder: Winchell Thoroughbreds LLC
- Owner: Winchell Thoroughbreds LLC; Godolphin Racing LLC
- Trainer: Steve Asmussen; Saeed bin Suroor
- Record: 15: 5-5-2
- Earnings: $1,664,673

Major wins
- Risen Star Stakes (2008); Louisiana Derby (2008); Northern Dancer Stakes (2008); Forego Handicap (2009)

Pyro (foaled on February 19, 2005, in Kentucky) is an American Thoroughbred Racehorse and sire. His sire is Pulpit, a son of the 1992 Eclipse Award Winner for American Horse of the Year, A.P. Indy. His dam is the mare Wild Vision, sired by the 1984 Breeders' Cup Classic winner, Wild Again.

== Racing Career (2007) ==
At age two Pyro won an allowance race by a nose and notably ran second to War Pass in the Grade 1 Champagne Stakes at Belmont Park in Elmont, New York and in the Breeders' Cup Juvenile at Monmouth Park in Oceanport, New Jersey.

== Racing Career (2008) ==
At age three, he made a very impressive debut in the Risen Star Stakes at the Fair Grounds Race Course in New Orleans, Louisiana. In a ten-horse race marked by a very slow pace, Pyro was last at the top of the stretch but moved between three horses and, as the track announcer said, he was "coming like a rocket" when he passed the rest of the field and won the 1 1/16 miles Risen Star Stakes by two lengths. The Daily Racing Form said: "His rally to win the Risen Star Stakes at the Fair Grounds in February was so phenomenal that he evoked comparisons to the legendary Silky Sullivan."

On March 8, Pyro won the Grade 2 Louisiana Derby at the Fair Grounds.

On April 12, Pyro finished a distant 10th, beaten by 39 lengths in the Blue Grass Stakes at Keeneland Race Course in Lexington, Kentucky. Pyro might have disliked the Polytrack at Keeneland, as opposed to conventional dirt tracks where he had never finished a race worse than third.

On May 3, he finished 8th in the 2008 Kentucky Derby.

On June 14, Pyro regained his form in the Northern Dancer Stakes, winning decisively against a top-notch field. In order: My Pal Charlie, Visionaire (12th in the Kentucky Derby), Recapturetheglory (5th in the Derby), Texas Wildcatter, and Unbridled Vicar.

On July 27, he came in a late charge to take second to Macho Again, (runner up in the Preakness Stakes), in the Grade II Jim Dandy Stakes at Saratoga Race Course. Pyro placed second by 1/2 length.

On August 23, he made a late closing finish to finish behind Colonel John and Mambo in Seattle in the Travers Stakes.

Then he was prepped for the Breeders Cup at Santa Anita to run in the Dirt Mile. It was well known that the synthetic track at Santa Anita was far from being the poly-track at Keeneland. Nevertheless, it was obviously not his day and he raced way behind the leaders and never made a late move.

In his first race in 2009 after a long lay-off, he took the Grade 1, 7 furlong Forego Stakes against grade 1 winning sprint horse Kodiak Kowboy.

== Stud career ==
Pyro was retired to stud in 2010 and currently stands at the Darley Japan Stallion Complex for a fee of 4,000,000 yen.

His most successful progenies are Mutually, winner of the 2021 JBC Classic, and Meisho Hario, two-time winner of the Teio Sho and also the winner of 2023's Kashiwa Kinen.
