= Wild Desert =

Canadian-bred Thoroughbred racehorse

- Sire: Wild Rush
- Grandsire: Wild Again
- Dam: Desert Radiance
- Damsire: Desert Wine
- Sex: Stallion
- Foaled: 2002
- Country: Canada
- Colour: Bay
- Breeder: Windways Farm Limited
- Owner: Daniel Borislow & partners
- Trainer: 1) Kenneth McPeek; 2) Richard E. Dutrow, Jr. 3) Robert J. Frankel; 4) Richard E. Dutrow, Jr.
- Record: 20: 3-7-2
- Earnings: US$1,042,674

Major wins
- Canadian Classic Race wins: Queen's Plate (2005)
- Last updated on February 16, 2010

Wild Desert (foaled March 24, 2002 in Ontario, Canada) is a Canadian bred Thoroughbred racehorse who won the 2005 Queen's Plate, Canada's most prestigious race and North America's oldest annually run stakes race.

Originally trained by Kenneth McPeek, following a poor performance in the 2005 Arkansas Derby, the horse was transferred to trainer Richard Dutrow, Jr. The colt did not race again until the June 26 Queen's Plate.

== Controversial Queen's Plate win ==
At the time of the running of the $1 million Queen's Plate, trainer Richard Dutrow, Jr. was under suspension after two of his horses tested positive for banned substances. Robert Frankel became the trainer of record just a few days before the race. In 2007, Dutrow was fined and suspended for providing misleading information about where Wild Desert had worked leading up to the race. The horse's record showed he had had only two less than stellar workouts prior to the Queen's Plate, but an investigation by racing authorities revealed that he had been training in secret. The controversy was added to because lead owner Daniel Borislow won $100,000 from bets he had made on Wild Desert to win the race. The horse won three races from twenty career starts; the Queen's Plate was the only major race win of his career.

Retired to stud duty for owners Sanford Goldfarb, Michael Dubb, Carl Gessler, Jr., and Mal Burroughs, Wild Desert stood at McMahon of Saratoga Thoroughbred near Saratoga Springs, New York through 2009 but was moved to Unbridled Stable near Greenville, New York, for the 2010 season.
