= Kip Deville =

American-bred Thoroughbred racehorse

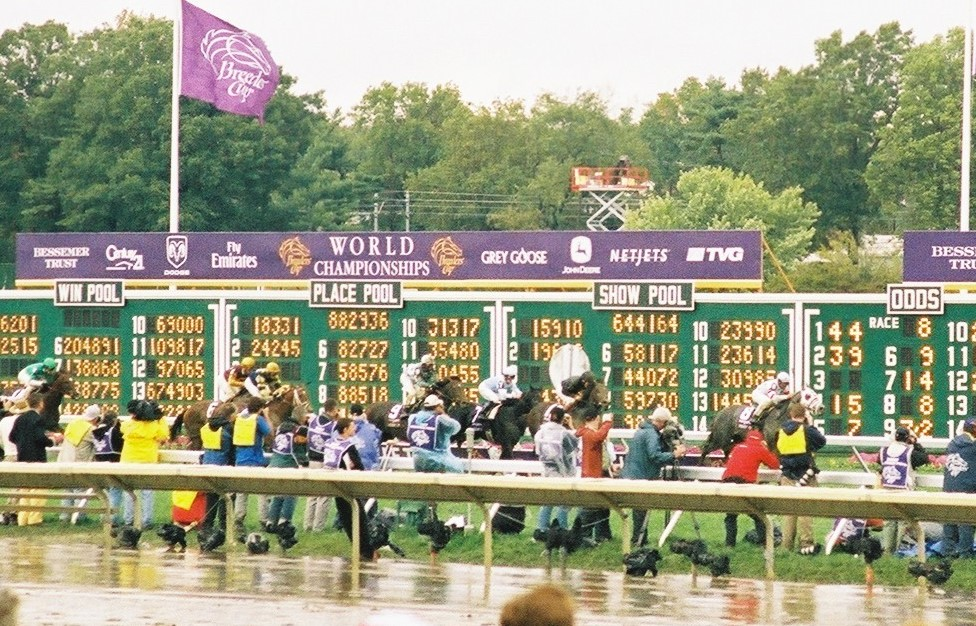
- Kip Deville winning the BC Mile
- Sire: Kipling
- Grandsire: Gulch
- Dam: Klondike Kaytie
- Damsire: Encino
- Sex: Stallion
- Foaled: 2003
- Country: United States
- Colour: Gray
- Breeder: Center Hills Farm
- Owner: IEAH Stables, Pegasus Holding Group Stables, Robe
- Trainer: Richard E. Dutrow, Jr.
- Record: 30: 12-4-2
- Earnings: $3,325,489

Major wins
- Sir Beaufort Stakes (2006); Frank E. Kilroe Mile Handicap (2007); Maker's Mark Mile Stakes (2007, 2008); Poker Handicap (2008); Gulfstream Park Turf Handicap (2009); Breeders' Cup wins: Breeders' Cup Mile (2007)

Awards
- Oklahoma State-bred Horse of the Year (2007, 2008); Oklahoma State-bred Older Horse (2007, 2008); Oklahoma State-bred Turf Runner (2007, 2008)

Honours
- Kip Deville Stakes at Remington Park
- Last updated on August 16, 2009

Kip Deville (May 3, 2003 – June 11, 2010) was an American Thoroughbred racehorse whose most important win came at age four in the 2007 Breeders' Cup Mile. He was an Eclipse Award finalist for American Champion Male Turf Horse in 2007.

== Background ==
Kip Deville was Bred in Oklahoma by Dr. Warren Center. He is the most notable horse sired by Kipling, a son of Gulch. His dam Klondike Kaytie (1988–2005), from whom he inherited his gray coat, produced at least four other winners.

== Racing career ==
In 2008, Kip Deville won his second straight edition of the Maker's Mark Mile Stakes at Keeneland Race Course. Though he was not scheduled to race again until early September, when he was sent to Woodbine Racetrack in Toronto, Ontario, Canada, to compete in the Woodbine Mile, a race in which he ran second in 2007. Dutrow decided to try the Poker Handicap. Kip Deville won. He returned to defend his title in the Breeders' Cup Mile at Santa Anita Park in October 2008 and came in second.

On August 8, 2008, the Oklahoma Thoroughbred Association named Kip Deville its Horse of the Year for 2007. He also won the Older Male and Turf Runner awards. Kip Deville is now the all-time leading accredited Oklahoma-bred runner. Klodike Kaytie was named broodmare of the year.

Kip Deville, who won the 2007 NetJets Breeders' Cup Mile (gr. IT), finished second in the 2008 Breeders' Cup Mile to Goldikova. He captured the 2008 Maker's Mark Mile Stakes (gr. IT) and the Poker Handicap (gr. IIIT).

Again, on August 15, 2009, the Oklahoma Thoroughbred Association named Kip Deville as Horse of the Year and best turf runner and older male.

== Laminitis ==
On December 10, 2009, Kip Deville was reported to be suffering from laminitis in both front feet and has been given a 20 percent chance to survive. Kip Deville's owners reported that he was recovering from laminitis and has "improved significantly" in a January 27, 2010 article. March 2, 2010, Bloodhorse reported that Kip Deville was ready to leave the Rood & Riddle Equine Hospital to continue his convalescence in a layup facility. On June 11, 2010, Bloodhorse announced that Kip Deville was euthanized after suffering severe setbacks.
