= Alan Garcia (jockey) =

Peruvian thoroughbred horse racing jockey

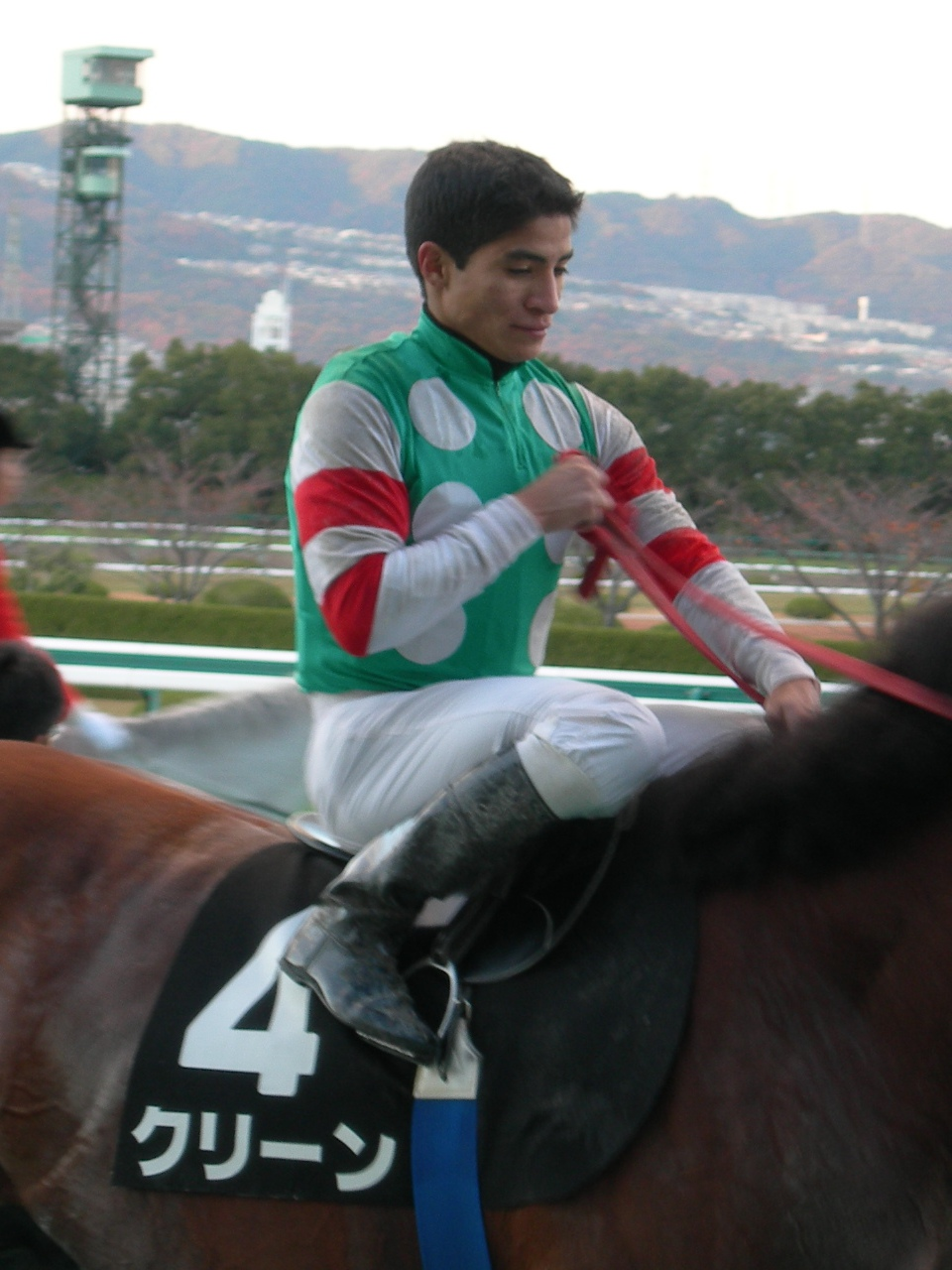
- Alan Garcia (2008, Hanshin Racecourse)

Personal information
- Born: October 2, 1985 (age 40) Lima, Lima Province, Peru
- Occupation: Jockey

Horse racing career
- Sport: Horse racing
- Career wins: 1580 approximately

Major racing wins
- Cicada Stakes (2005); Count Fleet Stakes (2005); Bernard Baruch Handicap (2007, 2008); Cliff Hanger Handicap (2007); Flower Bowl Invitational Stakes (2007); Fort Marcy Handicap (2007); Ladies Handicap (2007); Nashua Stakes (2007, 2008); New York Breeders' Cup Handicap (2007); New York Stallion Series (Fifth Avenue Division) (2007); Noble Damsel Breeders' Cup Handicap (2007); Stuyvesant Handicap (2007); Withers Stakes (2007); Wadsworth Memorial Handicap (2007); Bold Ruler Handicap (2008); Colonial Turf Cup (2008); Alfred G. Vanderbilt Handicap (2008); Adirondack Stakes (2008); Jimmy Winkfield Stakes (2008, 2009); Sands Point Stakes (2008); UAE Derby (2009); Nassau Stakes (2009); Jefferson Cup Stakes (2009); Poker Stakes (2009); Coaching Club American Oaks (2009); Damon Runyon Stakes (2010); Arlington Million (2013); South Ocean Stakes (2015) American Classics wins: Belmont Stakes (2008) Breeders' Cup wins: Breeders' Cup Filly & Mare Turf (2007)

Significant horses
- Da' Tara, Funny Cide Regal Ransom
- Updated on September 14, 2008

Alan Garcia (born October 2, 1985) was a Peruvian thoroughbred horse racing jockey. He was Peru's leading apprentice jockey in 2003 and in that same year he began racing in the United States at the Meadowlands Racetrack where he was also the leading apprentice. His father and grandfather were both jockeys in Peru. He is currently married and lives in Port Saint Lucie, Florida, with his wife and 3 sons. Garcia got his big break in 2007 when he won the Breeders' Cup Filly & Mare Turf. This was his first ever Breeders' Cup ride. The win, on Lahudood, meant that he was the third jockey ever to win his first Breeders' Cup race in his first attempt.

At his height, Garcia was one of the top jockeys on the Canadian Thoroughbred scene at Canada's most prestigious track Woodbine. Garcia rode Regal Ransom to a win at the $2 million 2009 UAE Derby in Dubai, leading the race from start to finish.

Garcia is a resident of Tinton Falls, New Jersey.

== Year-end charts ==
Chart (2005-2020)	Peak position
National Earnings List for Jockeys 2005	94
National Earnings List for Jockeys 2006	44
National Earnings List for Jockeys 2007	13
National Earnings List for Jockeys 2008	8
National Earnings List for Jockeys 2009	7
National Earnings List for Jockeys 2010	16
National Earnings List for Jockeys 2011	32
National Earnings List for Jockeys 2012	27
National Earnings List for Jockeys 2013	38
National Earnings List for Jockeys 2014	90
National Earnings List for Jockeys 2015	54
National Earnings List for Jockeys 2016	85
National Earnings List for Jockeys 2017	171
National Earnings List for Jockeys 2018	203
National Earnings List for Jockeys 2019	260
National Earnings List for Jockeys 2020	562

== Sources ==
- NYRA Biography, Page 109
- NTRA Biography
