= Eight Belles =

American-bred Thoroughbred racehorse

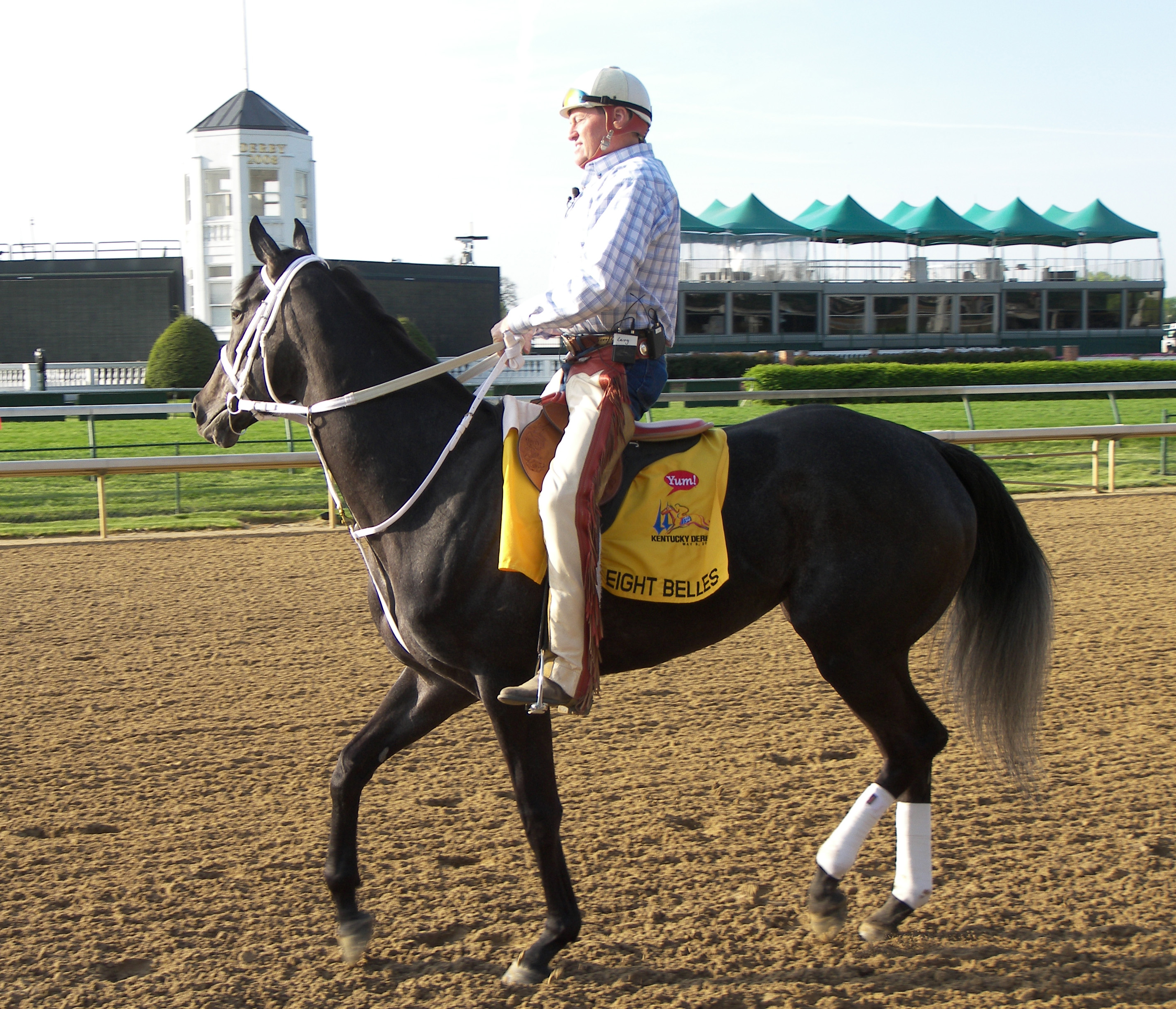
- Eight Belles at Churchill Downs, May 1, 2008, two days prior to the 134th Kentucky Derby
- Sire: Unbridled's Song
- Grandsire: Unbridled
- Dam: Away
- Damsire: Dixieland Band
- Sex: Filly
- Foaled: February 23, 2005
- Died: May 3, 2008 (aged 3); Louisville, Kentucky, U.S.
- Country: United States
- Color: Grey/Roan
- Breeder: Robert N. Clay & Serengeti Stable
- Owner: Fox Hill Farms
- Trainer: J. Larry Jones
- Record: 10: 5-3-1
- Earnings: $708,650

Major wins
- Martha Washington Stakes (2008); Honeybee Stakes (2008); Fantasy Stakes (2008) American Classic Race placing: Kentucky Derby 2nd (2008)

Honors
- Grade II Eight Belles Stakes at Churchill Downs (2009– )
- Last updated on 14 April 2021

Eight Belles (February 23, 2005 – May 3, 2008) was an American Thoroughbred racehorse who came second in the 2008 Kentucky Derby to the winner Big Brown. Her collapse just after the race resulted in immediate euthanasia.

Earlier in the year, Eight Belles became the first filly in Oaklawn Park history to win the Martha Washington Stakes, the Honeybee Stakes, and the Fantasy Stakes. She won the Martha Washington by 13½ lengths, setting a stakes record for margin of victory.

== Kentucky Derby breakdown ==
Eight Belles broke down approximately a furlong (1/8 mile) after the wire, while being slowed after the race. She suffered compound fractures of both front ankles and was immediately euthanized because of the nature of her injuries.

Dr. Larry Bramlage, the on-call veterinarian, stated that Eight Belles' trauma was too severe to even attempt to move her off the track.

According to the Louisville Courier-Journal, Bramlage said Eight Belles had fractures of the cannon and sesamoid bones in both front legs. That is the same type of break that was suffered, in the 2006 Preakness, by 2006 Kentucky Derby winner Barbaro in one leg.

Eight Belles was buried and memorialized in the garden of Churchill Downs' Kentucky Derby Museum on September 7, 2008. A race has been renamed in her honor, and was run on the Derby Day 2009 undercard as the Eight Belles Stakes.

== Remembering Eight Belles ==
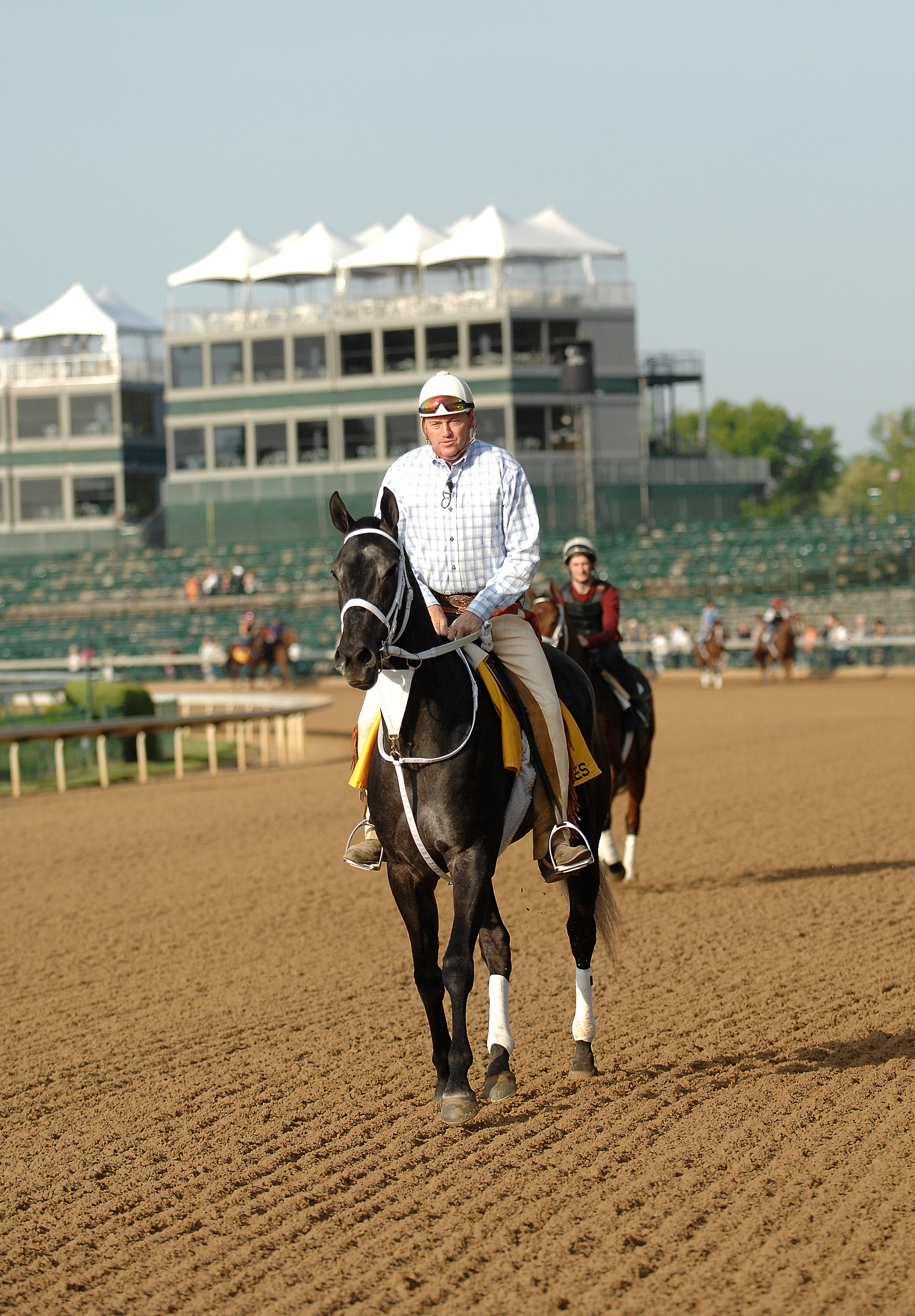
Eight Belles being exercised by Jones at Churchill Downs, May 1, 2008

The National Thoroughbred Racing Association (NTRA) asked jockeys riding at Pimlico Race Course during all races over the weekend of the 133rd running of the Preakness Stakes (May 16 and 17, 2008) to wear stickers on their pants or boots in honor of Eight Belles. The red and white stickers made by the NTRA had a bell, the number 8, and the word "Belles" on them. The Jockeys' Guild wholeheartedly agreed. Jockey John Velazquez said: "It's something to remind everybody of a great horse. What happened was a really sad thing, and we're sad. I think it [wearing the stickers] is a good thing to bring awareness to our game. We'll do whatever is possible to minimize anything that happens like that."

== Necropsy ==
Kentucky chief veterinarian Lafe Nichols performed a necropsy and tests at the University of Kentucky's Livestock Disease Diagnostic Center. According to a review of the results by the Associated Press, open fractures of both front legs at the fetlock joints were confirmed. They described lacerated skin on both legs, an absence of joint fluid in the damaged areas and congested lungs. She also had a bruised head and hemorrhaging in the left thyroid gland, which the report blamed on her fall after the initial injuries.

Larry Jones, her trainer, commented that he believes the horse just tripped over her own feet. "She's bad about stumbling while pulling up. She doesn't pick her feet up very high. It's one reason she could run very fast and far. She had the perfect motion for being effective and efficient. However, those horses who do that have a tendency to want to stumble."

The Jockey Club formed a panel to examine the issues, which include breeding practices, track surfaces and medication.

== Controversy ==
Veteran Washington Post sportswriter Sally Jenkins wrote that Thoroughbred horses had become too strong with bones too lightweight: "She ran with the heart of a locomotive, on champagne-glass ankles." Blaming the breeders and investors, Jenkins claimed, "Thoroughbred racing is in a moral crisis, and everyone now knows it."

The animal rights group PETA called for the suspension of jockey Gabriel Saez and the prize money to be revoked were he to be found at fault.

Six generations back takes Eight Belles, along with all 20 of the horses in the Derby and many horses racing in the United States today, to Native Dancer (foaled March 1950). Many public commentators have suggested a connection between extensive inbreeding in the intervening generations and the weak ankles seen in horses today, leading to Eight Belles' demise. the Los Angeles Times went so far as to headline its opinion piece that today's horses are being "bred for death". The owner of Eight Belles made comments and suggested solutions in an article in The Wall Street Journal.

Many news outlets and articles blamed Eight Belles' trainer, Larry Jones, for her death. In response to an article in The New York Times suggesting the sport was becoming a form of animal cruelty, Jones said, "I disagree wholeheartedly. These horses, they run because they like to run. I mean, if you knew how many horses were injured in the field running and just playing with other horses, I'm gonna be honest with you, we've had more horses injured on the farm than we have on the racetrack—they do more injury to themselves. This sport is not that cruel, and everyone does the best they can to make sure it is a safe track and a safe condition."

== Pedigree ==
Eight Belles' dam was Away, a descendant of Northern Dancer, and her sire was Unbridled's Song. Unbridled's Song's dam is a daughter of Caro. Caro is the sire of Winning Colors, one of only three fillies to win the Kentucky Derby.

Pedigree of Eight Belles (USA) grey mare, (2005)
Sire Unbridled's Song (USA) 1993	Unbridled (USA); 1987	Fappiano (USA); 1977	Mr. Prospector (USA); 1970
Sire Unbridled's Song (USA) 1993	Unbridled (USA); 1987	Fappiano (USA); 1977	Killaloe (USA); 1970
Sire Unbridled's Song (USA) 1993	Unbridled (USA); 1987	Gana Facil (USA); 1981	Le Fabuleux (FR); 1961
Sire Unbridled's Song (USA) 1993	Unbridled (USA); 1987	Gana Facil (USA); 1981	Charedi (USA); 1976
Sire Unbridled's Song (USA) 1993	Trolley Song (USA); 1983	Caro (IRE); 1967	Fortino II (FR); 1959
Sire Unbridled's Song (USA) 1993	Trolley Song (USA); 1983	Caro (IRE); 1967	Chambord (GB); 1955
Sire Unbridled's Song (USA) 1993	Trolley Song (USA); 1983	Lucky Spell (USA); 1971	Lucky Mel (USA); 1954
Sire Unbridled's Song (USA) 1993	Trolley Song (USA); 1983	Lucky Spell (USA); 1971	Incantation (USA); 1965
Dam Away (USA) 1997	Dixieland Band (USA); 1980	Northern Dancer (CAN); 1961	Nearctic (CAN); 1954
Dam Away (USA) 1997	Dixieland Band (USA); 1980	Northern Dancer (CAN); 1961	Natalma (USA); 1957
Dam Away (USA) 1997	Dixieland Band (USA); 1980	Mississippi Mud (USA); 1970	Delta Judge (USA); 1960
Dam Away (USA) 1997	Dixieland Band (USA); 1980	Mississippi Mud (USA); 1970	Sand Buggy (USA); 1963
Dam Away (USA) 1997	Be a Prospector (USA); 1991	Mr. Prospector (USA); 1970	Raise a Native (USA); 1961
Dam Away (USA) 1997	Be a Prospector (USA); 1991	Mr. Prospector (USA); 1970	Gold Digger (USA); 1962
Dam Away (USA) 1997	Be a Prospector (USA); 1991	Belonging (USA); 1979	Exclusive Native (USA); 1965
Dam Away (USA) 1997	Be a Prospector (USA); 1991	Belonging (USA); 1979	Straight Deal (USA); 1962

== In popular culture ==
=== Music ===
The 2011 songs "Blues For Eight Belles" and "Eight Belles Dreamt The Devil Was Dead" by Nathan Salsburg were inspired by Eight Belles and her euthanasia.

== Honors ==
Eight Belles was a finalist for the Eclipse Award's American Champion Three-Year-Old Filly for 2008.

== See also ==
- List of racehorses
