= Gayego =

American-bred Thoroughbred racehorse

- Sire: Gilded Time
- Grandsire: Timeless Moment
- Dam: Devil's Lake
- Damsire: Lost Code
- Sex: Stallion
- Foaled: March 26, 2005
- Died: August 31, 2022 (Age 17)
- Country: United States
- Colour: Dark Bay
- Breeder: Hargus Sexton & Sandra Sexton
- Owner: Bar None Ranches (08/2016); A. C. Avila (12/08); Godolphin Racing (12/08)
- Trainer: Paulo Lobo; A. C. Avila (12/08); Saeed bin Suroor (1/09)
- Record: 21: 8-4-2
- Earnings: $1,751,120

Major wins
- Arkansas Derby (2008); Ancient Title Stakes (2009); Dayjur Mahab Al Shimaal (2009)
- Last updated on 2 September 2022

Gayego (March 26, 2005 — August 31, 2022) was an American Thoroughbred Racehorse. A descendant of the Nearco, his sire is the 1992 Breeders' Cup Juvenile winner and Eclipse Award winner for American Champion Two-Year-Old Colt, Gilded Time. His dam is the mare Devil's Lake, a daughter of Lost Code. Hargus and Sandra Sexton bred Gayego in Kentucky.

== Racing Career (2007) ==
Gayego made his racing debut as a two-year-old on November 18 in a winning effort in a maiden special weight race at Hollywood Park in Inglewood, California. On December 28, he won an allowance race at Santa Anita Racetrack in Arcadia, California.

== Racing Career (2008) ==
Gayego made his three-year-old debut on January 20 with a win in the San Pedro Stakes at Santa Anita. He then finished a close second to Georgie Boy in the Grade 2 San Felipe Stakes on March 18.

Gayego made his first start outside of California in the Grade 2 Arkansas Derby on April 12 at Oaklawn Park Race Track in Hot Springs, Arkansas. It was also his first start on a conventional dirt surface. After contesting the early pace, Gayego took the lead around the final turn and then held off a late bid from Z Fortune to win by three-quarters of a length.

He participated in the 134th running of the Kentucky Derby on May 3 at Churchill Downs in Louisville, Kentucky. Even though he was one of the favorites at the 2008 Kentucky Derby, he finished 17th in the field. He was again among the betting favorites in the 2008 Preakness Stakes, but failed to finish in the money after taking the early lead, ending up 11th of 12.

On November 30, 2008, Gayego set a track record of 1:13.37 for 6½ furlongs at Hollywood Park Racetrack. In December he was sold to trainer, A. C. Avila who shortly thereafter sold him to Godolphin Racing.

== Racing Career (2009) ==
Racing at Nad Al Sheba Racecourse in Dubai, Gayego finished second in the Godolphin Mile and won the Group 3 Mahab Al Shimal - Dayjur Sent back to the United States, in October, at Santa Anita Park in California, he won the Grade 1 Ancient Title Stakes which earned him a berth in November's Breeders' Cup Sprint.

== Racing Career (2010 and 2011) ==
Gayego won the Presque Island Mile Stakes in September 2010.

== Stud career ==
Gayego entered Stud in 2012 where he stood at Norse Ridge Farm in King city Ontario Canada. He moved to Bar None Ranches in DeWinton, Alberta Canada for the 2013 season. Gayego died from colic August 31, 2022 and died at 17, according to Bar None Ranches in Alberta, Canada.
