= Da' Tara =

American-bred Thoroughbred racehorse

Da'Tara
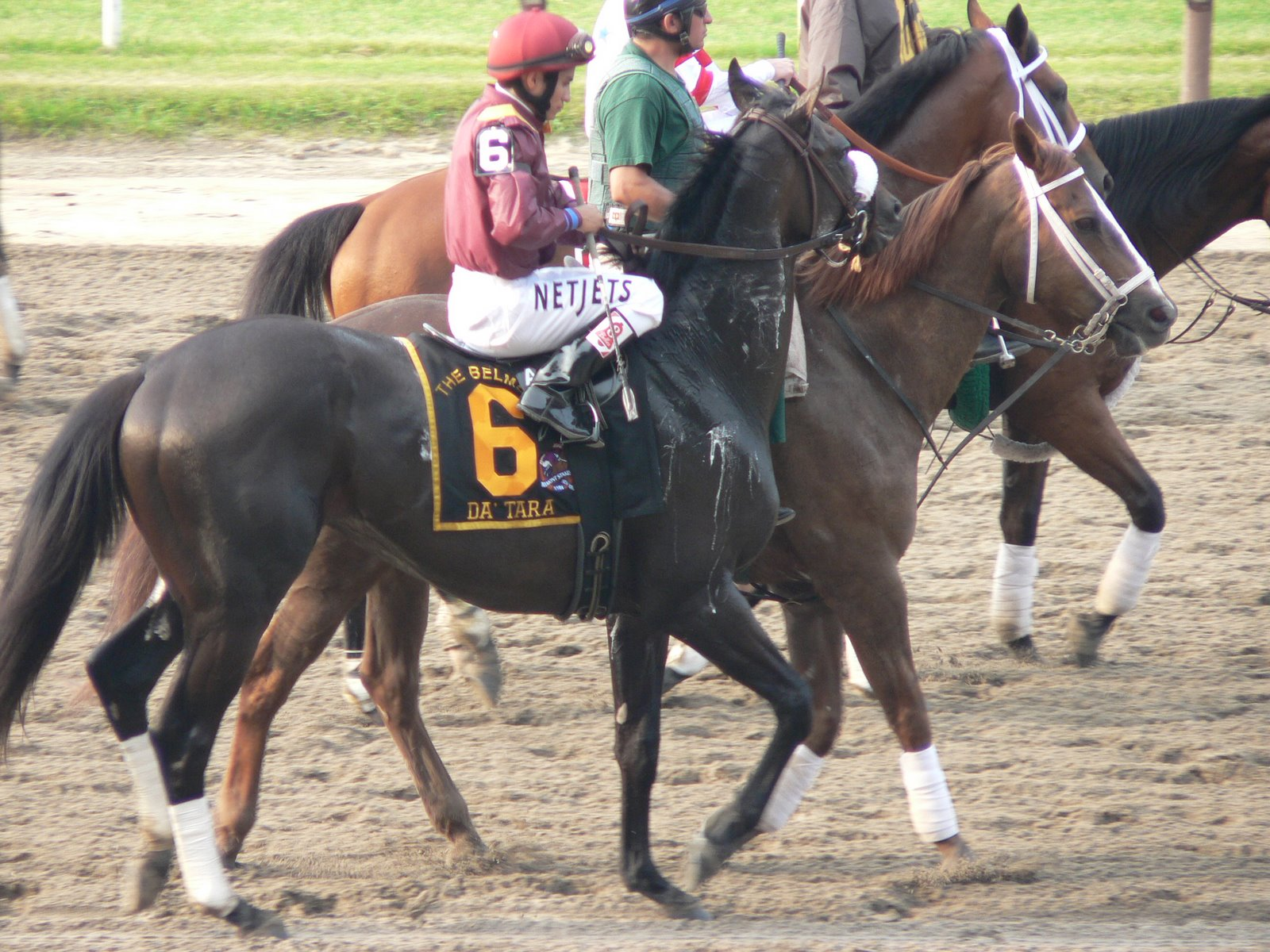
- Sire: Tiznow
- Grandsire: Cee's Tizzy
- Dam: Torchera
- Damsire: Pirate's Bounty
- Sex: Colt
- Foaled: April 26, 2005
- Country: United States
- Colour: Dark bay
- Breeder: WinStar Farm
- Owner: Robert LaPenta
- Trainer: Nick Zito
- Record: 19-2-5-3
- Earnings: $743,090

Major wins
- Triple Crown race wins: Belmont Stakes 2008
- Last updated on June 7, 2008

Da' Tara (foaled April 26, 2005) is an American thoroughbred racehorse who won the 2008 Belmont Stakes in an upset over Big Brown. Da' Tara was a 38-1 underdog entering the post at Belmont. He is trained by Nick Zito, his jockey is Alan Garcia, and his sire is Tiznow.

== Two-year-old season ==
In his first race, a 7-furlong maiden event on the main track at Belmont Park, Da' Tara lost to his stablemate, Anak Nakal, by a length, finishing second and beating the third place horse by a nose. Alan Garcia, who rode Da' Tara to victory in the 2008 Belmont Stakes, was also the jockey that day.

The colt failed to break his maiden as a two-year-old, finishing fourth in a Calder maiden race in December.

== Three-year-old season ==
In January 2008, Da' Tara led all the way to win a nine-furlong maiden race at Gulfstream. He was entered in an allowance race shortly after and finished third, beaten by more than four lengths after dueling on the lead. Already based at Gulfstream Park, trainer Nick Zito decided to enter Da' Tara in the Grade 1 Florida Derby. The other entries included Zito's Fountain of Youth winner Cool Coal Man, South American Champion Tomcito, and Big Brown, who had won both of his two previous starts. Da' Tara finished ninth, 23½ lengths behind the winner, Big Brown.

Da' Tara ran in the Derby Trial, finishing fifth. In the Barbaro Stakes, at 8.5 furlongs, he finished second behind Roman Emperor.

In the June 7, 2008, Belmont Stakes, Da' Tara, the longest shot in the field at 38-1 odds, moved swiftly to the lead under Alan Garcia and led wire to wire, winning by 5.25 lengths over Dennis of Cork, with Anak Nakal and Ready's Echo dead-heating for third another three lengths in arrears. Previously undefeated and heavy favorite Big Brown pulled up in the race in his attempt to win the Triple Crown. Da' Tara ($79) ran the 1 1/2 miles in the relatively slow time of 2:29.65 on a dirt track rated fast (with quarter-mile fractions of 23.82 seconds, 48.30, 1:12.90, 1:37.96, and 2:03.21).

By winning the Belmont Stakes in 2008, Da' Tara became the first horse since Amberoid in 1966 to have won a leg of the Triple Crown and not belong to the sire line of the Darley Arabian. (He is of the Godolphin Arabian sire line).

Da' Tara did not win another race after the Belmont Stakes. He was sold in November 2010 at the Keeneland stock sale in Lexington for $180,000 to Foye Genetics. In March 2011, he was put back into training in Florida, but never started in a race. In late 2011, Da' Tara was sold to Los Aguacates Stud, where he initially stood in Ocala, Florida, and was relocated to Carabobo, Venezuela, in December 2011.

== Notes ==
- Da' Tara's pedigree and partial racing stats

== Video ==
- www.ntra.com, Video, Belmont S. - June 7, 2008
