= Tale of Ekati =

American Thoroughbred racehorse

- Sire: Tale of the Cat
- Grandsire: Storm Cat
- Dam: Silence Beauty
- Damsire: Sunday Silence
- Sex: Stallion
- Foaled: 2005
- Country: USA
- Colour: Brown
- Breeder: Charles E. Fipke
- Owner: Charles E. Fipke
- Trainer: Barclay Tagg
- Record: 12 Starts: 5-1-0
- Earnings: $1,172,758

Major wins
- Futurity Stakes (2007); Wood Memorial Stakes (2008); Cigar Mile Handicap (2008); Jerome Handicap (2008)
- Last updated on November 30, 2008

Tale of Ekati (foaled March 31, 2005) is a retired Thoroughbred racehorse.

== Background ==
The brown colt's sire is Tale of the Cat by leading sire Storm Cat. His dam, Silence Beauty (half sister to the champion mare Sky Beauty out of Maplejinksy), is by Sunday Silence.

Tale of Ekati is owned by his breeder, Canadian geologist Charles E. Fipke and trained by Barclay Tagg who, in 2003, went two thirds of the way towards the Triple Crown with Funny Cide.

== Racing career ==
At two, Tale of Ekati won the 2007 Belmont Futurity Stakes. At three he won the Jerome Handicap and Wood Memorial. He finished 4th in the 2008 Kentucky Derby and sixth in the Belmont Stakes. Later he won the 2008 Cigar Mile Handicap.

In the Cigar, he raced for the first time against older horses. Making his bid in the stretch against Harlem Rocker, he came on strong but was edged out by a nose. But due to a ruling of "interference in the stretch" (when Tale of Ekati made his bid along the rail, Harlem Rocker had drifted in, forcing Edgar Prado to pull Tale of Ekati out to four wide and make up ground) was placed first.

He is named for the Ekati Diamond Mine, discovered by a group which included Fipke.

After three straight poor performances, in May 2009 Tale of Ekati was retired from racing. He was sent to Darby Dan Farm to stand stallion duties. His top progeny include 2015 Preakness runner-up Tale of Verve, 2017 Louisiana Derby winner Girvin, Comely Stakes winner Verve's Tale (Tale of Verve's full sister), graded stakes placed Tale of S'avall, and 2015 Davona Dale Stakes winner Ekati's Phaeton. His 2017 stud fee is $7,500.
