= Macho Again =

American-bred Thoroughbred racehorse

- Sire: Macho Uno
- Grandsire: Holy Bull
- Dam: Go Donna Go
- Damsire: Wild Again
- Sex: Stallion
- Foaled: 2005
- Country: United States
- Colour: Gray
- Breeder: Milan Kosanovich
- Owner: West Point Thoroughbreds
- Trainer: Dallas Stewart
- Record: 24: 6-6-0
- Earnings: $1,825,767

Major wins
- Derby Trial (2008); Jim Dandy Stakes (2008); New Orleans Handicap (2009); Stephen Foster Handicap (2009) American Classic Race placing: Preakness Stakes 2nd (2008)

Honours
- 2008-09 Fair Grounds Best Older Horse
- Last updated on November 12, 2009

Macho Again (foaled 2005 in Florida) is a retired American thoroughbred racehorse and sire. He was sired by the 2000 American Champion Two-Year-Old Colt Macho Uno, who in turn was a son of leading sire Holy Bull. He is out of the mare Go Donna Go, who is the daughter of Wild Again.

Macho Again got his start as a two-year-old under trainer Dallas Stewart at Saratoga Race Course. He ran four times, breaking his maiden with a victory at Churchill Downs. Macho Again also placed second twice while earning over $45,000.

== Three-year-old season ==
At age three, he continued to race for Dallas Stewart and began the year in New Orleans at the Fair Grounds Race Course. On February 28, 2008, he won a Fair Grounds allowance race by 4½ lengths after suffering a slight injury in the Grade III Lecomte Stakes in early January. One week prior to the Kentucky Derby, Macho Again won the Derby Trial, a grade three at Churchill Downs.

After this graded win, Stewart and West Point decided to send the horse to the second jewel of the Triple Crown, the $1,000,000 Preakness Stakes a Grade I at Pimlico Race Course at a mile and three sixteenths on conventional dirt. In the Preakness, Macho Again faced an overflow field of thirteen colts, many of them stakes winners. Media darling and Derby winner Big Brown was left alone on the lead with slow early fractions in the first half mile. With nothing to run at and a slow pace, Macho Again was taken out of his game and finished a distant second in the Preakness to Big Brown. He raced again in the Belmont Stakes and finished fifth.

In late July, Macho Again was one of 33 three-year-old horses invited to the start in the Haskell Invitational at Monmouth Park in New Jersey. However, he skipped the Haskell and instead raced in the Jim Dandy Stakes at Saratoga on July 27, 2008. In the Grade II Jim Dandy, Macho Again held off 3-2 favorite Pyro in the stretch to win by ½ length and earn $300,000, The colt also finished second in the Grade II Super Derby at Louisiana Downs in September 2008.

== Four-year-old season ==
At age four, Macho Again began his campaign in the Sunshine Millions Classic at Gulfstream Park in Florida. He failed to rally in that race. However, he rebounded from that effort with a win in the Grade II New Orleans Handicap on March 14, 2009, and was named the Fair Grounds' best older horse of the year based on that accomplishment. On June 13, 2009, he won Churchill Downs' top race for older horses in the Stephen Foster Handicap, earning his first Grade I win. On August 8, 2009, Macho Again ran second to Bullsbay in the Grade I Whitney Handicap.

Macho Again faced a tough field of eight, including super-filly Rachel Alexandra, in the Grade I Woodward Stakes on September 5, 2009, at Saratoga Race Course at one and one eighth miles on conventional dirt. In a suicidal pace early, the race set up perfectly for Macho Again to make a charge at the filly on the lead. He passed seven stakes winners in the field around the far turn and down the lane and lost to Rachel Alexandra by a head. Macho Again earned $150,000 for the runner up share in that grade one race and ended his career with earnings of $1,825,767.

He was retired from racing in July 2010 and now stands as stud at the Haras Gran Derby in Venezuela.

== Pedigree ==
Pedigree of Macho Again
Sire Macho Uno gray 1998	Holy Bull gray 1991	Great Above dark brown 1972	Minnesota Mac
Sire Macho Uno gray 1998	Holy Bull gray 1991	Great Above dark brown 1972	Ta Wee
Sire Macho Uno gray 1998	Holy Bull gray 1991	Sharon Brown gray 1980	Al Hattab
Sire Macho Uno gray 1998	Holy Bull gray 1991	Sharon Brown gray 1980	Agathea's Dawn
Sire Macho Uno gray 1998	Primal Force bay 1987	Blushing Groom chestnut 1974	Red God
Sire Macho Uno gray 1998	Primal Force bay 1987	Blushing Groom chestnut 1974	Runaway Bride
Sire Macho Uno gray 1998	Primal Force bay 1987	Prime Prospect bay 1978	Mr. Prospector
Sire Macho Uno gray 1998	Primal Force bay 1987	Prime Prospect bay 1978	Square Generation
Dam Go Donna Go dark brown 1994	Wild Again dark brown 1980	Icecapade gray 1969	Nearctic
Dam Go Donna Go dark brown 1994	Wild Again dark brown 1980	Icecapade gray 1969	Shenanigans
Dam Go Donna Go dark brown 1994	Wild Again dark brown 1980	Bushel-N-Peck; 1958	Khaled
Dam Go Donna Go dark brown 1994	Wild Again dark brown 1980	Bushel-N-Peck; 1958	Dama
Dam Go Donna Go dark brown 1994	Proud Nova dark brown 1981	Proud Birdie bay 1973	Proud Clarion
Dam Go Donna Go dark brown 1994	Proud Nova dark brown 1981	Proud Birdie bay 1973	Bernie Bird
Dam Go Donna Go dark brown 1994	Proud Nova dark brown 1981	Startex chestnut 1974	Vertex
Dam Go Donna Go dark brown 1994	Proud Nova dark brown 1981	Startex chestnut 1974	Star Bolt
