= IEAH Stables =

American horse racing stable

IEAH Stables (International Equine Acquisitions Holding) operated a thoroughbred horse racing stable in the United States that included Big Brown, the winner of the 2008 Kentucky Derby and Preakness . The company was based in Garden City, New York. It has been inactive since 2012.

IEAH was formed in 2003 by Michael Iavarone, who had long been interested in the sport and also saw business opportunities in the industry. Iavarone was the co-Chief Executive Officer, along with Richard Schiavo who oversaw administrative matters. The business operated as a hedge fund, with horses as the major asset. Major funding was provided by James Tagliaferri, who ran an asset-management company, TAG Virgin Islands. Iavrone was responsible for all bloodstock affairs, including the establishment of an "investment committee" that assisted in acquiring the stable's "bloodstock portfolio." In 2008, Hall of Fame jockey Gary Stevens joined as a bloodstock agent and spokesman. IEAH used a handful of trainers, including Rick Dutrow, Dominick Shettino, Donald Chatlos Jr. and John Terranova II.

In 2009, IEAH opened the Ruffian Equine Medical Center, a state of the art equine medical facility located near Belmont Park. The center closed down in 2011 due to financial difficulties, but in 2014 was re-opened by Cornell University under the name Cornell Ruffian Equine Specialists. In 2013, IEAH sold its last shares in Big Brown.

In 2015, Tagliaferri was sentenced to six years in prison for securities and investment adviser fraud for accepting kickbacks for investments made in companies including IEAH.

== Top horses ==
- Benny the Bull
- Big Brown
- I Want Revenge
- Kip Deville
- Patena
- Rebel Rebel
- Stardom Bound
- Subtle Aly
- Willy o'the Valley
- Wonder Lady Anne L
- Fantasy Of Flight
- Trickmeister

== Honors ==
IEAH Stables was a finalist for the Eclipse Award for outstanding owner in 2008.
