= Richard E. Dutrow Jr. =

American horse trainer

Rick Dutrow
Personal information
- Born: August 5, 1959 (age 67) Hagerstown, Maryland, United States
- Occupation: Trainer

Horse racing career
- Sport: Horse racing
- Career wins: 2,000 (ongoing)

Major racing wins
- Sports Page Handicap (2000); Floral Park Handicap (2002); Hudson Stakes (NYB) (2002, 2007, 2008); Prioress Stakes (2002); Cicada Stakes (2003); Comely Stakes (2003); Queens County Handicap (2003, 2004); Distaff Breeders' Cup Handicap (2003); General George Handicap (2004); Stuyvesant Handicap (2004); Toboggan Handicap (2004); Clark Handicap (2004); Demoiselle Stakes (2004, 2005); Massachusetts Handicap (2004); Pennsylvania Derby (2004); Donn Handicap (2005); Woodward Stakes (2005); Ashland Stakes (2005); Jerome Handicap (2005); Barbara Fritchie Handicap (2005); Davona Dale Stakes (2005); Maryland Breeders' Cup Handicap (2005); Tom Fool Handicap (2006); Metropolitan Handicap (2006); Coaching Club American Oaks (2006); Frank E. Kilroe Mile Handicap (2007); Carter Handicap (2007); Maker's Mark Mile Stakes (2007, 2008); Schuylerville Stakes (2007, 2010); Meadowlands Cup (2007); Frank J. De Francis Memorial Stakes (2007); Florida Derby (2008); Smile Sprint Handicap (2008); Sunshine Millions Dash (2009); Gulfstream Park Turf Handicap (2009, 2010); Swale Stakes (2009, 2010); Sunshine Millions Sprint (2010); Hutcheson Stakes (2010, 2011); Skip Away Handicap (2010); Alysheba Stakes (2010); Black-Eyed Susan Stakes (2010); Woody Stephens Stakes (2010); Jaipur Stakes (2010); Hopeful Stakes (2010); Whitney Stakes (2023); Fort Marcy Stakes (2024) American Classics / Breeders' Cup wins: Breeders' Cup Sprint (2005); Breeders' Cup Classic (2005, 2023); Breeders' Cup Mile (2007); Kentucky Derby (2008); Preakness Stakes (2008) International race wins: Dubai Golden Shaheen (2008); Godolphin Mile (2008); Woodbine Mile (2010)

Racing awards
- Leading trainer in New York (2001, 2002, 2005)

Significant horses
- Carson Hollow, Cyber Secret, Offlee Wild, Wild Desert, Saint Liam, Well Fancied, Sis City, Wonder Lady Anne L, Silver Wagon, Kip Deville, Silver Train, Benny the Bull, Big Brown, Court Vision, D' Funnybone; White Abarrio

Richard E. "Rick" Dutrow Jr. (born August 5, 1959, in Hagerstown, Maryland) is an American thoroughbred racehorse trainer. A winner of multiple stakes races including three victories in the Breeders' Cup, Dutrow campaigned Big Brown to his wins in the Florida Derby, Kentucky Derby, Preakness Stakes and Haskell Invitational in 2008 en route to champion three-year-old male honors.

Dutrow was handed a 10-year suspension by the New York State Racing and Wagering Board (now the New York State Gaming Commission) in October 2011, which was served from January 2013 until January 2023.

== Background ==
Dutrow's brother Anthony is also a trainer. Their father, Richard E. Dutrow Sr., was one of Maryland racing's "Big Four" who dominated racing in that state during the 1960s and 1970s and who helped modernize flat racing training. At age sixteen, Rick Jr. began working as his father's assistant. In 1995, he set up his own public stable in New York after his father left the NYRA circuit to return to Maryland.

== Training career ==
Dutrow's first major success came in 2005 when he won two Breeders' Cup races with Silver Train and Saint Liam. His 1,000th lifetime victory was with Kip Deville in the Frank E. Kilroe Mile on March 3, 2007.

In 2008, he trained Big Brown to Kentucky Derby and Preakness Stakes victories, although the colt failed to capture the Triple Crown with a last place finish in the 140th Belmont Stakes. At the time, Dutrow had been suspended or fined 72 times by US horse racing authorities and had admitted regularly administering the steroid Winstrol to his horses including Big Brown. Nevertheless, Big Brown's accomplishments helped to make Dutrow one of the finalists for that year's Eclipse Award for Outstanding Trainer.

=== Suspension ===
On October 12, 2011, the New York State Racing and Wagering Board suspended Dutrow from racing for 10 years and fined him $50,000, citing a long history of racing violations. This followed a decision by the Kentucky Horse Racing Commission's Licensing Review Committee not to renew his license in that state. Dutrow continued to train horses while he appealed the ruling in court.

Dutrow began serving his suspension in January 2013 after he exhausted his legal options in New York State. The following month he filed a federal lawsuit against the New York State Gaming Commission (the governing body that replaced the racing and wagering board that month), the Association of Racing Commissioners International (ARCI) and several other entities, seeking monetary damages and an overturning of his suspension. The suit alleged that Dutrow was "substantially and irreparably harmed" by the suspension and claims that he was deprived of due process under the law. The lawsuit was dismissed in July 2014, and an appeal was dismissed nearly a year later.

In 2020 the Queens District Attorney's office re-opened its investigation into Dutrow's suspension based on new allegations that incriminating evidence may have been planted in his barn. At the time, Dutrow received support for the reinstatement of his license from former Yankees manager Joe Torre and others.

Dutrow withdrew his application for a training license in Kentucky in July 2020 after the licensing committee of the Kentucky Horse Racing Commission indicated it would not rule on it. This was despite testimony supporting Dutrow given by individuals including trainer Dale Romans, equine veterinarian Dr. Larry Bramlage, and a former New York State Gaming Commission steward.

=== Return to training ===
Upon the conclusion of his 10-year suspension in January 2023, Dutrow successfully applied for a training license in New York. On May 6, 2023, Dutrow won his first race since the end of his suspension when Prince of Pharoahs [sic], a horse he claimed one month earlier, won an allowance race at Belmont Park. At the time of that win, Dutrow had 15 horses in his barn.

On August 5, 2023, Dutrow won the Whitney Stakes at Saratoga on his 64th birthday with White Abarrio. It was Dutrow's first Grade I stakes win since completing his suspension. Then in November, White Abarrio won the Breeders Cup Classic.

On September 20, 2026, Dutrow won his 2,000th career race at Belmont Park.
