= Magnum Moon =

American-bred Thoroughbred racehorse

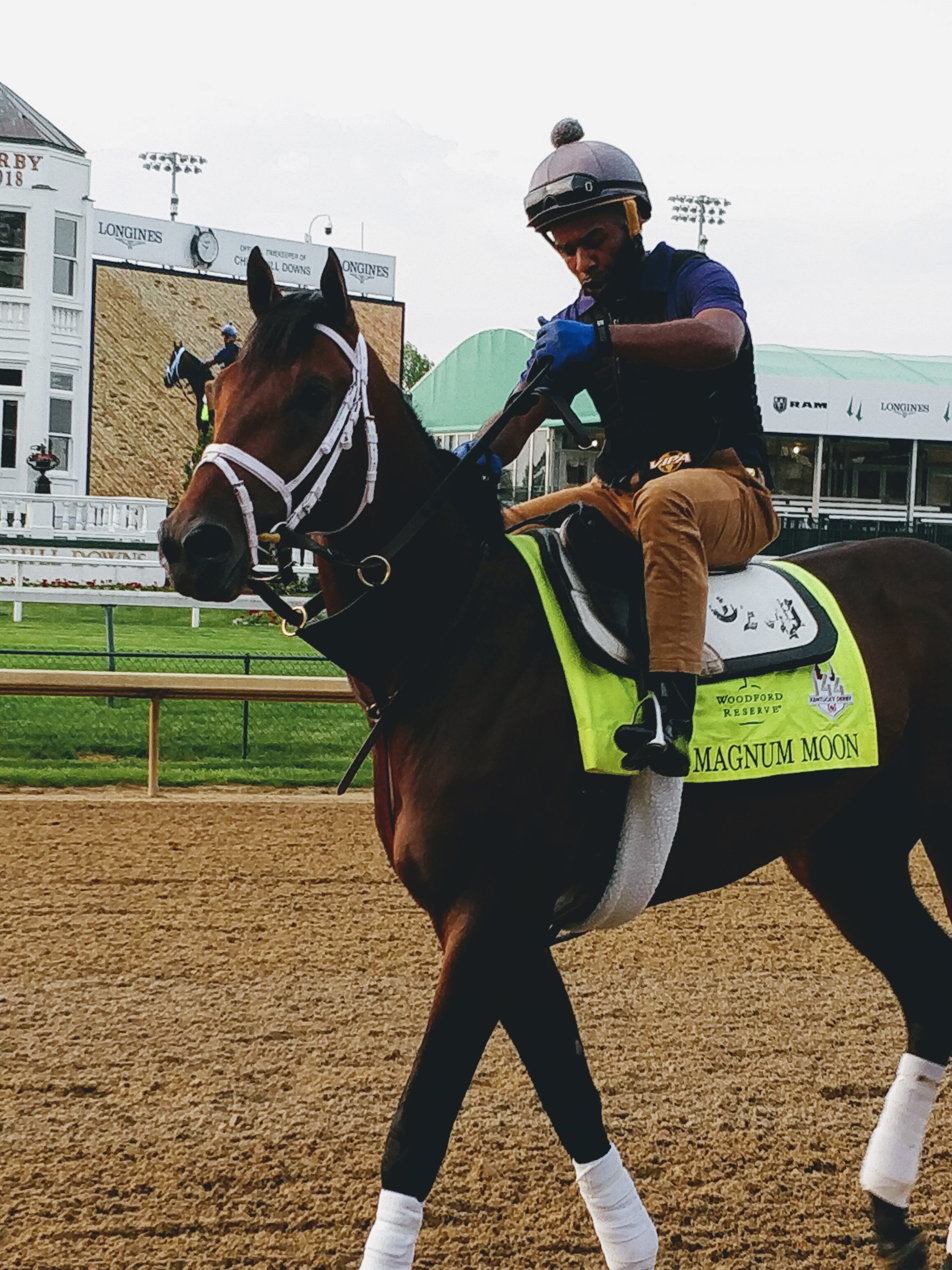
- Magnum Moon training before the Kentucky Derby.
- Sire: Malibu Moon
- Grandsire: A.P. Indy
- Dam: Dazzling Song
- Damsire: Unbridled's Song
- Sex: Colt
- Foaled: May 9, 2015-October 4, 2019
- Country: United States
- Colour: Bay
- Breeder: Ramona S. Bass, LLC.
- Owner: Lawana L. and Robert E. Low
- Trainer: Todd Pletcher
- Record: 5: 4-0-0
- Earnings: $1,177,800

Major wins
- Rebel Stakes (2018); Arkansas Derby (2018)

Magnum Moon (May 9, 2015 – October 4, 2019) was an American Thoroughbred racehorse. Unraced as a two-year-old he won his first four starts of 2018, including the Rebel Stakes and the Arkansas Derby to establish himself as a leading contender for the 2018 Kentucky Derby. He suffered his sole defeat in that race, then was retired after injuring himself in a June workout. He was later euthanized after battling laminitis.

== Background ==
Magnum Moon was a bay colt with a small white star bred in Kentucky by Ramona S. Bass, LLC. He was a late foal, being born on May 9, 2015. In September 2016 the yearling was offered for sale at Keeneland and was bought for $380,000 by Robert and Lawana Low, the owners of trucking company Prime Inc. The colt was sent into training with Todd Pletcher.

His sire, Malibu Moon won only one small race before his track career was ended by injury but became a very successful breeding stallion: his offspring have included Orb, Declan's Moon, Devil May Care and Gormley. His dam Dazzling Song was an unraced mare sired by Unbridled's Song out of the Floral Park Handicap winner Win McCool.

== Racing career ==
=== 2018: three-year-old season ===
Magnum Moon was unraced as a juvenile and made his track debut in a maiden race over six furlongs at Gulfstream Park on January 13. Ridden by Luis Saez he started well, took a clear advantage at half way and won by four and a half lengths from the favored Under A Spell. On February 15 the colt started 1/10 favorite for an allowance race over one mile at Tampa Bay Downs and won comfortably ("in hand") by two lengths.

Magnum Moon was stepped up in class for his next race, the Grade II Rebel Stakes over eight and a half furlongs at Oaklawn Park on March 17. He started the 3.6/1 second choice behind the Bob Baffert-trained Solomini in a field of ten which also included the Hopeful Stakes winner Sporting Chance. After racing just behind the leaders Magnum Moon moved into the lead exiting the final turn and drew away in the straight to win by three and a half lengths from Solomini with Combatant a head back in third. Todd Pletcher commented "We felt like we had a very talented colt... this was a step up in class and running against accomplished, seasoned colts. We were confident that he was training very well, coming into it in great shape, and just hoped he could handle the continued rise in class."

The Arkansas Derby over nine furlongs at the same track on April 14 saw Magnum Moon moved up to Grade I level for the first time and the colt stated the 4/5 favorite in a nine-runner field. Solomini and Combatant were again in opposition, while the best of the others appeared to be Quip (Tampa Bay Derby) and Tenfold. Magnum Moon took the lead soon after the start and set a steady pace from Quip before breaking clear of his rivals early in the straight. Despite hanging right under pressure he maintained his advantage and came home four lengths clear of Quip with Solomini and Combatant in third and fourth. After the race Pletcher said "He showed his versatility. He's won a number of different ways now, and I think he's proven that he's the kind of horse that doesn't need the race to unfold a certain way, that he's able to kind of make his own race".

Magnum Moon entered the 2018 Kentucky Derby as one of the favorites but broke poorly and was never in contention, finishing 19th. "It was just bumper cars for a while", said Pletcher. "He just got into a position he'd never been in before behind horses, eating a lot of slop. Just never was able to get into a comfortable rhythm at any point."

Magnum Moon was being prepared for his next start when he suffered a career-ending injury to his left front leg in a workout on June 23. On October 4, 2019, after a year long battle with laminitis, he was euthanized at Cornell Ruffian Clinic in Elmont, N.Y.

== Pedigree ==
Pedigree of Magnum Moon (USA), bay colt, 2015
Sire Malibu Moon (USA) 1997	A.P. Indy; 1989	Seattle Slew	Bold Reasoning
Sire Malibu Moon (USA) 1997	A.P. Indy; 1989	Seattle Slew	My Charmer
Sire Malibu Moon (USA) 1997	A.P. Indy; 1989	Weekend Surprise	Secretariat
Sire Malibu Moon (USA) 1997	A.P. Indy; 1989	Weekend Surprise	Lassie Dear
Sire Malibu Moon (USA) 1997	Macoumba; 1992	Mr. Prospector	Raise a Native
Sire Malibu Moon (USA) 1997	Macoumba; 1992	Mr. Prospector	Gold Digger
Sire Malibu Moon (USA) 1997	Macoumba; 1992	Maximova	Green Dancer
Sire Malibu Moon (USA) 1997	Macoumba; 1992	Maximova	Baracala
Dam Dazzling Song (USA) 2008	Unbridled's Song; 1993	Unbridled	Fappiano
Dam Dazzling Song (USA) 2008	Unbridled's Song; 1993	Unbridled	Gana Facil
Dam Dazzling Song (USA) 2008	Unbridled's Song; 1993	Trolley Song	Caro
Dam Dazzling Song (USA) 2008	Unbridled's Song; 1993	Trolley Song	Lucky Spell
Dam Dazzling Song (USA) 2008	Win McCool; 2003	Giant's Causeway	Storm Cat
Dam Dazzling Song (USA) 2008	Win McCool; 2003	Giant's Causeway	Mariah's Storm
Dam Dazzling Song (USA) 2008	Win McCool; 2003	Win Crafty Lady	Crafty Prospector
Dam Dazzling Song (USA) 2008	Win McCool; 2003	Win Crafty Lady	Honeytab (Family 16-g)
