= William Donald Schaefer Handicap top three finishers =

This is a listing of the horses that finished in either first, second, or third place and the number of starters in the William Donald Schaefer Handicap, a grade 3 American thoroughbred horse race run on dirt at 1-1/8 miles for three-year-olds and up at Pimlico Race Course in Baltimore, Maryland.

Year	Winner	Second	Third	Starters
2017	No Race	No Race	No Race	-
2016	No Race	No Race	No Race	-
2015	No Race	No Race	No Race	-
2014	No Race	No Race	No Race	-
2013	No Race	No Race	No Race	-
2012	No Race	No Race	No Race	-
2011	Apart	Colizeo	Icabad Crane	9
2010	Blame	No Advantage	Timber Reserve	7
2009	No Advantage	Real Merchant	Ea	7
2008	No Race	No Race	No Race	0
2007	Flashy Bull	Hesanoldsalt	Ryan's for Real	8
2006	Master Command	Andromeda's Hero	Funny Cide †	6
2005	Zacocity	Clays Awesome	Royal Assault	8
2004	Seattle Fitz	The Lady's Groom	Roaring Fever	8
2003	Windsor Castle	Changeintheweather	Tempest Fugit	8
2002	Tenpins	Bowman's Band	Tactical Side	7
2001	Perfect Cat	Rize	Judge's Case	8
2000	Ecton Park	The Groom Is Red	Crosspatch	4
1999	Perfect to a Tee	Allen's Oop	Smile Again	7
1998	Acceptable	Littlebitlively	Testafly	8
1997	Western Echo	Suave Prospect	Mary's Buckaroo	5
1996	Canaveral	Michael's Star	Rugged Bugger	7
1995	Tidal Surge	Mary's Buckaro	Ameri Valay	5
1994	Taking Risks	Frottage	Super Memory	6
1993	Root Boy	Late Guest	Forry Cow How	n/a
1992	Senator to Be	Fiftysevenvete	Medium Cool	n/a
1991	Senator to Be	Flaming Emperor	Challenge My Duty	n/a
1990	Flaming Emperor	Loyal Pal	Jet Stream	n/a
1989	Private Terms	Intensive Command	New York Swell	n/a
1988	Little Bold John	Along Came Jones	Entertain	n/a
1987	Brilliant Steper	Bagetelle	Fobby Forbes	n/a

A † designates an American Champion or Eclipse Award winner.
