= Malibu Moon =

American-bred Thoroughbred racehorse

- Sire: A.P. Indy
- Grandsire: Seattle Slew
- Dam: Macoumba
- Damsire: Mr. Prospector
- Sex: Stallion
- Foaled: February 23, 1997
- Died: May 18, 2021 (aged 24)
- Country: United States
- Colour: Bay
- Breeder: B. Wayne Hughes
- Owner: Spendthrift Farm
- Trainer: Melvin Stute
- Record: 2: 1-1-0
- Earnings: $33,840

Malibu Moon (February 23, 1997 – May 18, 2021) was a Thoroughbred stallion bred in Kentucky. Retired young to stud following a racing injury as a two-year-old, Malibu Moon thereafter sired multiple grade I stakes winners, two Eclipse Award winners, and was the sire of Orb, winner of the 2013 Kentucky Derby.

== Background ==
Bred in Kentucky by B. Wayne Hughes, Malibu Moon was a bay sired by A.P. Indy out of the Mr. Prospector mare Macoumba.

Macoumba was a grade I winner in France, winning the Prix Marcel Boussac, before she was imported to the United States by B. Wayne Hughes. Macoumba's dam, Maximova, was a Gr.I winner herself, winning against males in the 1982 Prix de la Salamandre. Maximova also produced five stakes winners as a broodmare.

Malibu Moon was a half-brother to stallion Parker's Storm Cat, who is best known as the sire of the turf runner Ben's Cat. Malibu Moon's half-sister Curriculum is the dam of notable turf sire Temple City.

== Race career ==
Malibu Moon had a short racing career, but showed initial promise. His first race was a maiden special weight as a two-year-old at Hollywood Park, and despite brushing the gate at the start he made his way through the crowd in the stretch to finish second. His second and final start was also a maiden special weight at Hollywood Park, in which he finished first. He suffered a slab fracture in his knee in May of his two-year-old season, which forced his early retirement.

== Stud career ==
Malibu Moon first entered stud in 2000 for a low stud fee of $3,000 at Country Life Farm in Maryland. After producing Eclipse Champion two-year-old Declan's Moon and graded winner Perfect Moon in his first two crops, he was relocated in 2004 to the Castleton Lyons Farm in Kentucky to service a wider range of mares, and his fee was raised to about $10,000. He was then relocated again in 2008 to Spendthrift Farms, where he stood for a fee of $75,000 since 2017.

As of 2017, Malibu Moon sired over 100 black-type stakes winners and 40 graded stakes winners. His progeny have collectively earned over $99 million. Malibu Moon has also been recognized as a broodmare sire, particularly as the broodmare sire of Eclipse Champions Stellar Wind and Sierra Leone.

Malibu Moon died from an apparent heart attack in his paddock at Spendthrift Farm on May 18, 2021.

Malibu Moon's progeny include:

- Orb: Winner of the 2013 Kentucky Derby, Florida Derby, and Fountain of Youth Stakes
- Declan's Moon: Winner of the Hollywood Futurity, Del Mar Futurity, and Hollywood Prevue Stakes. 2003 American Champion Two-Year-Old Male.
- Life at Ten: Winner of the Ogden Phipps Handicap, Beldame Stakes, Delaware Handicap, and Sixty Sails Handicap
- Devil May Care: Winner of the Mother Goose Stakes, Coaching Club American Oaks, Frizette Stakes, and Bonnie Miss Stakes
- Gormley: Winner of the Santa Anita Derby, FrontRunner Stakes, and Sham Stakes
- Moonshine Memories: Winner of the Del Mar Debutante Stakes and Chandelier Stakes
- Heavenly Love: Winner of the Alcibiades Stakes
- Carina Mia: Winner of the Acorn Stakes, Eight Belles Stakes, and Golden Rod Stakes
- Ransom the Moon: Winner of the Bing Crosby Stakes and Kona Gold Stakes
- Obruchev: Winner of the Zen-Nippon Nisai Yushun (JPN Gr.I)
- Farrell: Winner of the Fair Grounds Oaks, Rachel Alexandra Stakes, and Golden Rod Stakes
- Stanford: Winner of the Charles Town Classic, Harlan's Holiday Stakes, Long Branch Stakes, and Challenger Stakes
- Ah Day: Winner of the Federico Tesio Stakes, Toboggan Handicap, Fire Plug Stakes (twice), 5 other stakes
- Mr. Z: Winner of the Ohio Derby
- Perfect Moon: Winner of the Best Pal Stakes, Hollywood Juvenile Championship, El Cajon Stakes

Malibu Moon is the damsire of:

- Stellar Wind: Winner of the Clement L. Hirsch Stakes (twice), Zenyatta Stakes, Beholder Mile Stakes, Apple Blossom Handicap, Santa Anita Oaks, Santa Ysabel Stakes, Torrey Pines Stakes, Summertime Oaks. 2015 American Champion Three-Year-Old Filly
- Girvin: Winner of the Haskell Invitational Stakes, Louisiana Derby, and Risen Star Stakes
- My Conquestadory: Winner of the Alcibiades Stakes and Summer Stakes
- By the Moon: Winner of the Ballerina Stakes, Frizette Stakes, Vagrancy Handicap, Bed O' Roses Stakes (twice)
- Sierra Leone: Winner of the Risen Star Stakes, Blue Grass Stakes, and Breeders' Cup Classic
