= Popcorn Deelites =

American-bred Thoroughbred racehorse (1998–2022)

- Popcorn Deelites' at Old Friends Equine
- Sire: Afternoon Deelites
- Grandsire: Private Terms
- Dam: Turquoise Gal
- Damsire: Navajo
- Sex: Gelding
- Foaled: April 19, 1998
- Died: January 20, 2022 (aged 23)
- Country: United States
- Color: Bay
- Breeder: Dennis B. Swartz
- Owner: David Hoffman
- Trainer: Priscilla Leon; Jimmie D. Claridge
- Record: 58: 11-5-7
- Earnings: $56,880

Popcorn Deelites (April 19, 1998 – January 20, 2022) was an American thoroughbred race horse who is best known for playing the lead role in the 2003 film Seabiscuit.

Foaled in 1998 by Afternoon Deelites out of Turquoise Gal (by Navajo), the gelding ran for six years as a low-level claimer, yet he did win 11 of his 58 starts and accumulated $56,880 in earnings.

Popcorn Deelites' bloodline contains other notable horses such as Damascus, Bold Ruler, Secretariat, Ack Ack, Sword Dancer, Buckpasser, Northern Dancer, and Gallant Man, all on his top line. From his dam he goes back to Bimelech, Black Toney, Johnstown, Count Fleet, and the "blue hen" mare La Troienne.

== Films ==
Popcorn Deelites starred in the title role of the 2003 Oscar-nominated Seabiscuit. As Seabiscuit, he played alongside Jeff Bridges as Seabiscuit's owner Charles S. Howard, Tobey Maguire as jockey Red Pollard, Chris Cooper as trainer Tom Smith, Hall of Fame jockey Gary Stevens as the "Ice Man" George Woolf, and Hall of Famer Chris McCarron as Charles Kurtsinger, another Hall of Fame jockey.

A blood bay with dark points like Seabiscuit, Popcorn Deelites was trained by Phoenix, Arizona-based Priscilla Leon and owned by David Hoffmans of Henderson, Nevada. In the film, Popcorn's speciality was to play Seabiscuit breaking from the gate. Because of his natural speed as a sprinter (most of his races were 6 furlong events), he also played Seabiscuit in his races. Five other horses also played Seabiscuit, each one chosen for a special ability. One horse was cast especially to lie flat out and sleep.

== Retirement ==
Popcorn Deelites' grave at Old Friends Equine

Before being acquired by Old Friends, a horse rescue and retirement center founded by Michael Blowen in Georgetown, Kentucky, Popcorn was back running in claiming races at Colorado's Arapahoe Park. Blowen bought the horse for $1,500, and he lived at Old Friends with a number of retired racehorses. He died on January 20, 2022, at the age of 23.

== See also ==
- List of racehorses
