= Afternoon Deelites =

American-bred Thoroughbred racehorse (1992–2023)

- Sire: Private Terms
- Grandsire: Private Account
- Dam: Intimate Girl
- Damsire: Medaille d'Or
- Sex: Stallion
- Foaled: February 28, 1992
- Died: February 14, 2023 (aged 30)
- Country: United States
- Colour: Dark Bay
- Breeder: Blue Seas Music Inc.
- Owner: Burt Bacharach
- Trainer: Richard Mandella
- Record: 12:7-3-0
- Earnings: US$ $1,061,193

Major wins
- Hollywood Futurity (1994); Hollywood Prevue Stakes (1994); Malibu Stakes (1995); San Felipe Stakes (1995); San Vicente Stakes (1995); Commonwealth Stakes (1996)

Afternoon Deelites (February 28, 1992 – February 14, 2023) was an American Thoroughbred racehorse.

== Background ==
Afternoon Deelites was bred and raced by pianist, composer and music producer, Burt Bacharach (1928–2023) and trained by Hall of Fame inductee Richard Mandella.

The horse was born in West Virginia, sired by Wood Memorial Stakes winner Private Terms, out of the mare Intimate Girl, whose sire was the 1978 Canadian Champion Two-Year-Old Colt Medaille d'Or, a son of the legendary Secretariat.

== Racing career ==
Afternoon Deelites won several Graded stakes races including two Grade 1 events. In 1994 he won the Hollywood Futurity in stakes record time for a mile and a sixteenth that still stands as at the end of 2022. In 1995, three-year-old Afternoon Deelites was narrowly beaten in the Santa Anita Derby and went on to run eighth in that year's Kentucky Derby.

== Stud record ==
Afternoon Deelites did stallion duty at Airdrie Stud in Kentucky before being moved to a Clear Creek Stud breeding farm in Louisiana. He was the sire of 23 graded stakes winners; one of his offspring, Popcorn Deelites, became known for roles in motion pictures, especially as Seabiscuit in the 2003 film of the same name.

Afternoon Deelites' descendants include:

c = colt, f = filly

Foaled	Name	Sex	Major Wins
1998	Deelightful Irving	c	Pan American Stakes
1998	Miss Pickums	f	Golden Rod Stakes, Kentucky Cup Juvenile Fillies Stakes
2001	No Tolerance	c	Robert F. Carey Memorial Handicap
2002	Zappa	c	San Pasqual Handicap, Cougar II Handicap

== Illness and death ==
Due to age related infertility problems, in May 2011, Afternoon Deelites was sent to the Old Friends Equine retirement home for Thoroughbred racehorses in Georgetown, Kentucky.

Afternoon Deelites was euthanized on February 14, 2023, following complications from colic. He died 2 weeks before his 31st birthday and five days after his owner Burt Bacharach.
