= Eight Belles Stakes =

- Class: Grade II
- Location: Churchill Downs; Louisville, Kentucky, United States
- Inaugurated: 1956 (as Oaks Prep)
- Race type: Thoroughbred - Flat racing
- Sponsor: Sysco (2023)
- Website: www.churchilldowns.com

Race information
- Distance: 7 furlongs
- Surface: Dirt
- Track: left-handed
- Qualification: Three-year-old fillies
- Weight: 122lbs with allowances
- Purse: US$700,000 (2026)

The Eight Belles Stakes is a Grade II American Thoroughbred horse race for three-year-old filly sprinters run at a distance of 7 furlongs at Churchill Downs in Louisville, Kentucky each year on Kentucky Oaks Day.

== History ==
The inaugural running of the event was on the opening day of the 1956 Spring meeting at Churchill Downs on Saturday, 27 April 1956 as the seventh and main feature race on the nine race program named the Oaks Prep over a distance of six furlongs. The event attracted the 1955 US Champion Two-Year-Old Filly Doubledogdare and Calumet Farm's fine filly Princess Turia. The event was scheduled as a preparatory event for the much longer Kentucky Oaks which was scheduled on the following Friday. Doubledogdare started as the 2/5 odds-on favorite and held off Princess Turia to win by half a length in a time of 1:11 3/5. However, six days later Princess Turia turned the tables and defeated her rival in the Kentucky Oaks by a neck.

In 1961 the distance of the event was increased to seven furlongs.

The 1962 winner Cicada started 3/10 odds-on and easily won the event by four lengths under the reins of US Hall of Fame jockey William L. Shoemaker. Cicada then proceeded to win the Kentucky Oaks en route to being crowned US Champion Three-Year-Old Filly.

In 1967 the event was renamed to the La Troienne Stakes for one of the greatest broodmares in the United States throughout the twentieth century, La Troienne. The 1967 winner Fure Sail would go on to being crowned US Champion Three-Year-Old Filly as would the 1968 winner Dark Mirage and 1972 winner Susan's Girl. The 1972 Canadian Horse of the Year La Prevoyante would win the event in 1973.

In 1982 the event was run in split divisions. This was only time that the event was run in split divisions.

The event was classified as Grade III in 1998.

Between 2004 and 2010 the event was run over a lightly longer distance of 7 1/2 furlongs.

Churchill Downs announced that beginning in 2009 this race would be called the Eight Belles Stakes in honor of the deceased filly, Eight Belles, who finished second in the 2008 Kentucky Derby. In 2010, the Louisville Distaff Stakes was renamed the La Troienne Stakes.

Since 2011 the event has been scheduled on the same card as the Kentucky Oaks.

The American Graded Stakes Committee upgraded the race to its current Grade II status in 2016.

== Records ==
Speed record:

- 7 furlongs: 1:21.29 - Contested (2012)
- 7 1/2 furlongs: 1:28.18 - Joint Effort (2006)

Margins

- 11 3/4 lengths - Roxelana (2000)

Most wins by a jockey:

- 9 - Pat Day (1981, 1982, 1986, 1988, 1989, 1990, 1996, 1999, 2001)

Most wins by a trainer:

- 4 - Brad H. Cox (2017, 2019, 2022, 2026)

Most wins by an owner:

- 3 - Heiligbrodt Racing Stable (2002, 2009, 2018)

== Winners ==
Year	Winner	Jockey	Trainer	Owner	Distance	Time	Purse	Grade	Ref
Eight Belles Stakes
2026	On Time Girl	Irad Ortiz Jr.	Brad H. Cox	Albaugh Family Stables	7 furlongs	1:22.16	$680,000	II	
2025	Look Forward	Umberto Rispoli	Michael W. McCarthy	Reddam Racing	7 furlongs	1:22.36	$579,660	II	
2024	My Mane Squeeze	Luis Saez	Michael J. Maker	William Butler & WinStar Farm	7 furlongs	1:22.85	$534,340	II	
2023	Red Carpet Ready	Luis Saez	George R. Arnold II	Ashbrook Farm & Upland Flats Racing	7 furlongs	1:22.28	$500,000	II	
2022	Matareya	Flavien Prat	Brad H. Cox	Godolphin	7 furlongs	1:21.86	$500,000	II	
2021	Obligatory	Jose Ortiz	William I. Mott	Juddmonte Farms	7 furlongs	1:21.89	$300,000	II	
2020	Sconsin	James Graham	Gregory D. Foley	Lloyd Madison Farms IV	7 furlongs	1:21.30	$300,000	II	
2019	Break Even	Shaun Bridgmohan	Brad H. Cox	Klein Racing	7 furlongs	1:22.13	$250,000	II	
2018	Mia Mischief	Ricardo Santana Jr.	Steven M. Asmussen	William & Corrine Heiligbrodt, Heider Family Stables & Madaket Stables	7 furlongs	1:21.84	$200,000	II	
2017	Benner Island	Javier Castellano	Brad H. Cox	Shortleaf Stable	7 furlongs	1:24.28	$200,000	II	
2016	Carina Mia	Julien R. Leparoux	William I. Mott	Three Chimneys Farm	7 furlongs	1:21.74	$200,000	II	
2015	Promise Me Silver	Robby Albarado	W. Bret Calhoun	Robert G. Luttrell	7 furlongs	1:22.90	$200,000	III	
2014	Fiftyshadesofgold	Mike E. Smith	W. Bret Calhoun	Estate of Clarence Scharbauer Jr.	7 furlongs	1:22.50	$200,725	III	
2013	So Many Ways	Garrett K. Gomez	Thomas M. Amoss	Maggi Moss	7 furlongs	1:22.84	$177,150	III	
2012	Contested	Martin Garcia	Bob Baffert	Natalie J. Baffert	7 furlongs	1:21.29	$110,000	III	
2011	Victoria's Wildcat	Kent J. Desormeaux	Robert B. Hess Jr.	Bob & Victoria Bayer & Jonathan Metcalf	7 furlongs	1:23.03	$118,800	III	
2010	Buckleupbuttercup	Julien R. Leparoux	Eddie Kenneally	Avalon Farms	7 1/2 furlongs	1:29.49	$110,700	III	
2009	Four Gifts	Shaun Bridgmohan	Steven M. Asmussen	Heiligbrodt Racing Stable	7 1/2 furlongs	1:30.94	$113,300	III	
La Troienne Stakes
2008	Game Face	John R. Velazquez	Todd A. Pletcher	Zabeel Racing International	7 1/2 furlongs	1:28.44	$168,450	III	
2007	Silverinyourpocket	Calvin H. Borel	Helen Pitts-Blasi	Robert D. & Marilyn Randal	7 1/2 furlongs	1:30.14	$182,850	III	
2006	Joint Effort	Edgar S. Prado	Dale L. Romans	Donald R. Dizney	7 1/2 furlongs	1:28.18	$119,600	III	
2005	Seek a Star	Jorge F. Chavez	John T. Ward Jr.	John C. Oxley	7 1/2 furlongs	1:28.75	$100,000	III	
2004	Friendly Michelle	Alex O. Solis	Bob Baffert	Ed Friendly	7 1/2 furlongs	1:28.26	$112,200	III	
2003	Final Round	Jerry D. Bailey	George R. Arnold II	G. Watts Humphrey Jr.	7 furlongs	1:22.13	$111,800	III	
2002	Cashier's Dream	Donnie Meche	Steven M. Asmussen	Heiligbrodt Racing Stable & Team Valor	7 furlongs	1:24.83	$112,600	III	
2001	Caressing	Pat Day	David R. Vance	Carl F. Pollard	7 furlongs	1:22.90	$121,000	III	
2000	Roxelana	Larry Melancon	William G. Huffman	William L. S. Landes III	7 furlongs	1:21.97	$113,400	III	
1999	Sapphire n' Silk	Pat Day	Dallas Stewart	William A. Carl	7 furlongs	1:23.85	$112,800	III	
1998	Sister Act	Calvin H. Borel	Jeffrey N. Jacobs	Choctaw Racing Stable & Harold C. Kitchen	7 furlongs	1:24.46	$112,700	III	
1997	Star of Goshen	Alex O. Solis	Mike Puype	Cobra Farm	7 furlongs	1:22.75	$113,500	Listed	
1996	Rare Blend	Pat Day	David A. Vivian	Barbara Vivian & Dominic Vittese	7 furlongs	1:23.75	$85,575	Listed	
1995	Dixieland Gold	Dave Penna	Louis M. Goldfine	Arthur I. Appleton	7 furlongs	1:22.74	$84,750	Listed	
1994	Packet	Joe M. Johnson	Gary G. Hartlage	Upson Downs Farm & Patricia Lenihan	7 furlongs	1:24.14	$85,800	Listed	
1993	Traverse City	Julie Krone	William I. Mott	Charles Armstrong	7 furlongs	1:24.38	$58,500	Listed	
1992	Bell Witch	Julie Krone	Lawrence C. Metz	Tom E. Hall	7 furlongs	1:24.35	$56,150	Listed	
1991	Exclusive Bird	Jerry D. Bailey	John T. Ward Jr.	John C. Oxley	7 furlongs	1:23.64	$56,850	Listed	
1990	Screen Prospect	Pat Day	Peter M. Vestal	Alamo Ranches	7 furlongs	1:24.40	$56,950		
1989	Top of My Life	Pat Day	Thomas Victor Smith	Robert & Joan Masterson	7 furlongs	1:23.80	$56,300		
1988	Gerri n Jo Go	Pat Day	D. Wayne Lukas	Joseph Scardino & David Sofro	7 furlongs	1:25.40	$55,700		
1987	Footy	Chris McCarron	Willard L. Proctor	Cherry Valley Farm	7 furlongs	1:23.80	$58,500		
1986	Lazer Show	Pat Day	Donald R. Winfree	James Devaney	7 furlongs	1:23.60	$38,180		
1985	Magnificent Lindy	Eddie Delahoussaye	Neil D. Drysdale	Mrs. Paula Tucker	7 furlongs	1:23.40	$35,150		
1984	Sintra	K. Keith Allen	Steven C. Penrod	Cherry Valley Farm	7 furlongs	1:23.20	$35,650		
1983	How Clever	Gerland Gallitano	Billy S. Borders	J. R. Straus	7 furlongs	1:25.40	$37,300		
1982	Betty Money	Larry Melancon	Ronnie G. Warren	Russell Michael	7 furlongs	1:26.20	$35,675		Division 1
1982	Hoist Emy's Flag	Pat Day	Edwin K. Cleveland Jr.	Nickels & Dimes Stable	7 furlongs	1:26.20	$35,675		Division 2
1981	Heavenly Cause	Pat Day	Woodford C. Stephens	Ryehill Farm	7 furlongs	1:24.00	$26,450		
1980	Ribbon	Ronald Ardoin	Harry Trotsek	Arthur B. Hancock III & Leon Peters	7 furlongs	1:26.60	$29,900		
1979	Justa Reflection	Alexander L. Fernandez	Arthur P. Hoffman	Marvin L. Warner	7 furlongs	1:25.80	$27,450		
1978	White Star Line	Eddie Maple	Woodford C. Stephens	Newstead Farm	7 furlongs	1:25.20	$20,800		
1977	Sweet Alliance	Chris McCarron	Bud Delp	Windfields Farm	7 furlongs	1:25.20	$22,000		
1976	Moreland Hills	Allen Rini	James E. Morgan	Thomas F. Classen	7 furlongs	1:26.60	$21,200		
1975	§ High Estimate	Eddie Delahoussaye	Douglas M. Davis Jr.	Diamond Stable	7 furlongs	1:25.60	$21,200		
1974	†Shantung Silk	Angel Cordero Jr.	A. B. May	William Lussky	7 furlongs	1:25.40	$22,200		
1973	La Prevoyante (CAN)	Jimmy LeBlanc	Joseph Starr	Jean-Louis Levesque	7 furlongs	1:23.80	$21,600		
1972	Susan's Girl	Victor Tejada	John W. Russell	Fred W. Hooper	7 furlongs	1:23.80	$21,600		
1971	Grafitti	Don Brumfield	Horatio A. Luro	Louisa d’Andelot Carpenter	7 furlongs	1:24.00	$22,600		
1970	Missile Belle	Pete Anderson	Woodford C. Stephens	John Morris	7 furlongs	1:23.60	$16,350		
1969	Double Delta	Carlos Marquez	Stanley M. Rieser	Clifford Lussky	7 furlongs	1:23.60	$16,200		
1968	Dark Mirage	Manuel Ycaza	Everett W. King	Lloyd Miller	7 furlongs	1:24.60	$16,800		
1967	Furl Sail	Bill Shoemaker	John L. Winans	Mrs. Edwin K. Thomas	7 furlongs	1:23.40	$16,200		
Oaks Prep
1966	Justakiss	Ray Broussard	Stanley M. Rieser	Clifford Lussky	7 furlongs	1:25.20	$16,200		
1965	Marry the Prince	Kenneth Knapp	Willard L. Proctor	Graham Brown	7 furlongs	1:23.60	$13,900		
1964	Silver Dollar	Don Brumfield	Stanley M. Rieser	Barbara Hunter	7 furlongs	1:23.60	$15,825		
1963	Saree	Jacinto Vasquez	Donald Lague	Mrs. Mary Keim	7 furlongs	1:25.60	$10,700		
1962	Cicada	Bill Shoemaker	J. Homer Hayes	Meadow Stable	7 furlongs	1:22.20	$16,800		
1961	Play Time	Johnny Sellers	Ivan H. Parke	Pin Oak Stable	7 furlongs	1:23.60	$16,950		
1960	Rash Statement	John L. Rotz	Allen R. Hultz	Hal Price Headley	6 furlongs	1:12:00	$12,175		
1959	Ruwenzori	Bill Shoemaker	R. E. Meredith	Preston Madden	6 furlongs	1:11.20	$12,775		
1958	Stay Smoochie	Walter Blum	Jack Price	Dorchester Farm Stable	6 furlongs	1:11.40	$12,325		
1957	§ Pillow Talk	Kenneth Church	Maurice H. Dudley	Hal Price Headley	6 furlongs	1:11.20	$12,675		
1956	Doubledogdare	Steve Brooks	Moody Jolley	Claiborne Farm	6 furlongs	1:11.60	$13,150		

Notes:
§ Ran as an entry
† In the 1974 running Clemenna was first past the post but came out in the straight causing interference to the second-place finisher Shantung Silk and was disqualified and placed second. Shantung Silk was declared the winner.

== See also ==
- List of American and Canadian Graded races
