= 2010 Breeders' Cup Classic =

Thoroughbred horse race

27th Breeders' Cup Classic
- Breeders' Cup Classic
- Location: Churchill Downs
- Date: November 6, 2010
- Winning horse: Blame
- Jockey: Garrett Gomez
- Trainer: Albert Stall Jr.
- Owner: Claiborne Farm and Adele Dilschneider
- Conditions: fast
- Surface: Dirt
- Attendance: 72,739

The 2010 Breeders' Cup Classic was the 27th running of the Breeders' Cup Classic, part of the 2010 Breeders' Cup World Thoroughbred Championships program. It was run on November 6, 2010, at Churchill Downs in Louisville, Kentucky with a purse of $5,000,000. In a highly publicized race, the mare Zenyatta was attempting to defend her victory in the 2009 Breeders' Cup Classic and retire undefeated. Running well behind in the early portion of the race, she made a sustained drive but came up a head short of the winner, Blame.

The Classic is run on dirt at one mile and one-quarter (approximately 2000 m). It is run under weight-for-age conditions, with entrants carrying the following weights:

- Northern Hemisphere three-year-olds: 122 pounds (55 kg)
- Southern Hemisphere three-year-olds: 117 pounds (53 kg)
- Four-year-olds and up: 126 pounds (57 kg)
- Any fillies or mares receive a 3 pounds (1.4 kg) allowance

== Contenders ==
Many horsemen and handicappers considered the 2010 field to be one of the best ever assembled, including the top three-year-olds and older horses. "I would imagine that when this race was designed, when they came up with the concept in 1982, this is what they had in mind", said trainer Todd Pletcher. "It brings the best horses in the world together, on a neutral playing field, on a traditional dirt surface. We'll see what happens."

One of the most popular horses in recent memory, Zenyatta came into the Classic as the even-money favorite off of a nineteen race win streak. However, there were several factors that made her vulnerable in the race. She had only raced against male horses once, in the 2009 Breeders' Cup Classic, and the field for the 2010 renewal was considered to be much deeper. She had raced almost exclusively in California and on synthetic dirt surfaces, and it was unknown how she would respond to traveling across country and racing at Churchill Downs.

The leading contenders included:

- Blame, who had won the 2009 Clark Handicap and 2010 Stephen Foster Handicap at Churchill Downs, and was considered to have a "home field advantage". He also won the Whitney Handicap and finished second in the Jockey Club Gold Cup
- Quality Road, winner of the Donn Handicap, Metropolitan Handicap and Woodward Stakes
- Haynesfield, winner of the Jockey Club Gold Cup
- Lookin at Lucky, the top three-year-old contender after winning the Preakness Stakes, Haskell Invitational and Indiana Derby
- First Dude, runner-up in the Preakness

Unlike the years before, there were no entries from Europe, largely due to the change to a traditional dirt surface that favored North American runners compared to the synthetic dirt surface over which the race was run in 2008 and 2009. Espoir City entered from Japan but was given little chance by the bettors.

== Race description ==
Quality Road and First Dude went to the early lead, setting moderate opening fractions. Blame settled in the middle of the pack, while Zenyatta trailed far behind. Her stride was uneven —– "like a rocking horse", according to The New York Times —– and she took some time to settle. Around the far turn, both Blame and Zenyatta started to close ground. Blame, much closer to the pace and benefiting from a perfect trip, reached the lead by mid-stretch and looked likely to win. Zenyatta had been moving fast but faced a wall of horses in front of her. Jockey Mike Smith moved her out wide then made several more adjustments before the mare was able to find running room. In deep stretch, she started to close ground rapidly but came up a neck short. After the race, Smith was in tears, blaming himself for the defeat. "I got away slow and got squeezed out of there," he said. "I couldn't level her off. If you have to blame anyone today, it would be me."

Blame's Classic victory marked the first Breeders' Cup Classic win for trainer Albert Stall Jr. and owners Adele Dilschneider and Claiborne Farm, which was celebrating its 100th anniversary. "I'm still pinching myself," said Dilschneider. "I've been involved with the Hancock family for years, and I wouldn't be here if it wasn't for Seth Hancock, owner of Claiborne. How many family-owned and operated farms are there left? That's the beauty of this. You can't let it slip away. And they won't. With Claiborne, the horse always comes first."

Garrett Gomez, Blame's jockey, had mixed emotions about the win. "(Zenyatta)'s been an ambassador for racing. We had a lot of people out here supporting her", he said. "She was going for 20 for 20 and she came up a head short. I'm glad I was able to give her the defeat, but at the same time I wish she could have gone out 20 for 20 at someone else's expense."

With three Grade I wins in 2010 and the head-to-head victory over Zenyatta, Blame's connections believed he deserved to be named American Horse of the Year. Ultimately however that honor went to Zenyatta, with five Grade I wins in 2010. She was also named Champion Older Female Horse while Blame was unanimously named the Champion Older Male Horse.

== Results ==
Finish	Program Number	Margin (lengths)	Horse	Jockey	Trainer	Final Odds	Winnings
1st	5	Head	Blame	Garrett Gomez	Albert Stall Jr.	5.20	2,700,000
2nd	8	3 1/2 lengths	Zenyatta	Mike Smith	John Shirreffs	1.00	900,000
3rd	6	Neck	Fly Down	Julien Leparoux	Nicholas Zito	26.50	495,000
4th	12	1 3/4 lengths	Lookin At Lucky	Martin Garcia	Bob Baffert	4.90	300,000
5th	2	3 1/2 lengths	Paddy O'Prado	Kent Desormeaux	Dale Romans	33.40	150,000
6th	10	1 length	Etched	Alan Garcia	Kiaran McLaughlin	62.80	
7th	7	1/2 length	Musket Man	Rajiv Maragh	Derek Ryan	28.20	
8th	4	1/2 length	First Dude	Robby Albarado	Dale Romans	37.30	
9th	9	3 1/2 lengths	Pleasant Prince	Joel Rosario	Wesley A. Ward	63.80	
10th	11	8 1/4 lengths	Espoir City (JPN)	Tetsuzo Sato	Akio Adachi	30.50	
11th	3	6 1/2 lengths	Haynesfield	Ramon A. Dominguez	Steve Asmussen	18.00	
12th	1		Quality Road	John Velazquez	Todd Pletcher	6.50	

Source: Equibase

Times: 1/4 – 0:23.24; 1/2 – 0:47.14; 3/4 – 1:11.01; mile – 1:37.12; final – 2:02.28.
Fractional Splits: (:23.24) (:23.90) (:23.87) (:26.11) (:25.16)

== Payout ==
Payout Schedule:

Program Number	Horse	Win	Place	Show
5	Blame	12.40	4.40	3.80
8	Zenyatta		3.60	2.80
6	Fly Down			8.60

- $2 Exacta (5–8) Paid $33.20
- $2 Trifecta (5–8–6) Paid $465.00
- $1 Superfecta (5–8–6–12) Paid $980.40
