= Thoroughbred Owners and Breeders Association =

Organization for Thoroughbred racehorse owners and breeders

The Thoroughbred Owners and Breeders Association (TOBA) is an American trade organization for Thoroughbred racehorse owners and breeders, which is based in Lexington, Kentucky. Founded in 1961, TOBA's stated mission is to "improve the economics, integrity and pleasure of the sport on behalf of Thoroughbred owners and breeders."

Through its American Graded Stakes Committee, TOBA is responsible for annually evaluating and setting a Graded stakes race designation for races in the United States whose recent editions have consistently represented the highest quality competition. TOBA is represented on the board of directors of the National Thoroughbred Racing Association (NTRA) as a founding member and on the American Horse Council.

The Blood-Horse is a publication of TOBA. Daniel J. Metzger has been president of the association since 1999.

In 2022, the 8th National Thoroughbred Owner Conference – organized by Thoroughbred OwnerView (The Jockey Club and TOBA), BloodHorse and NYRA – hosted Thoroughbred owners and breeders, professionals and others who support and promote Thoroughbred ownership through networking and education. Participants and sponsors included:

- BloodHorse,
- Bradley Thoroughbreds,
- Breeders Cup,
- Centennial Farms,
- Fasig-Tipton,
- Jellyfish Water,
- Keeneland,
- NYRA – New York Racing Association,
- NYTB – New York Thoroughbred Breeders, Inc.,
- NYTHA – New York Thoroughbred Horsemen’s Association, Inc.,
- Sackatoga Stable,
- Stonestreet Stables (notable for Jess Stonestreet Jackson Jr. and Rachel Alexandra),
- String Music Thoroughbred Investments,
- The GREEN Group,
- The Jockey Club,
- Thoroughbred OwnerView (The Jockey Club and TOBA),
- West Point Thoroughbreds (notable for Always Dreaming, Flashy Bull, Flightline (horse), Macho Again, Stephen Foster Stakes, William Donald Schaefer Memorial Stakes).
