= Carina Mia =

American thoroughbred racehorse

- Sire: Malibu Moon
- Grandsire: A.P. Indy
- Dam: Miss Simpatia
- Damsire: Mr. Prospector
- Sex: Filly
- Foaled: January 27, 2013
- Country: USA
- Color: Dark Bay
- Breeder: Spendthrift Farm
- Owner: Three Chimneys Farm
- Trainer: Chad C. Brown
- Record: 16:5-4-4
- Earnings: $1,403,520

Major wins
- Golden Rod Stakes (2015); Acorn Stakes (2016); Eight Belles Stakes (2016)

Carina Mia (foaled January 27, 2013) is an American Thoroughbred racehorse who won the 2016 Acorn Stakes.

== Career ==
Carina Mia's first race was on October 10, 2015, at Keeneland. She finished in 2nd.

On November 28, 2015, she won the Golden Rod Stakes.

In 2016, she captured both the Eight Belles Stakes and the Acorn Stakes, winning both races with the Acorn Stakes being her first Grade 1 victory. This would be her first and last Grade 1 victory. He was then entered in the 2016 Coaching Club American Oaks in July, but finished in 2nd place. That was followed up with a 3rd-place result in the August 2016 Ballerina Stakes.

The horse's last race was on November 4, 2017, when she finished in 3rd at the Breeders' Cup Filly & Mare Sprint, after a disappointing season.

== Pedigree ==
Pedigree of Carina Mia (USA), Dark Bay, 2013
Sire Malibu Moon(USA) 1997	A.P. Indy (USA); 1989	Seattle Slew	Bold Reasoning
Sire Malibu Moon(USA) 1997	A.P. Indy (USA); 1989	Seattle Slew	My Charmer
Sire Malibu Moon(USA) 1997	A.P. Indy (USA); 1989	Weekend Surprise	Secretariat
Sire Malibu Moon(USA) 1997	A.P. Indy (USA); 1989	Weekend Surprise	Lassie Dear
Sire Malibu Moon(USA) 1997	Macoumba (USA); 1992	Mr. Prospector	Raise a Native
Sire Malibu Moon(USA) 1997	Macoumba (USA); 1992	Mr. Prospector	Gold Digger
Sire Malibu Moon(USA) 1997	Macoumba (USA); 1992	Maximova	Green Dancer
Sire Malibu Moon(USA) 1997	Macoumba (USA); 1992	Maximova	Baracala
Dam Miss Simpatia (ARG) 1998	Southern Halo (USA); 1983	Halo	Hail to Reason
Dam Miss Simpatia (ARG) 1998	Southern Halo (USA); 1983	Halo	Cosmah
Dam Miss Simpatia (ARG) 1998	Southern Halo (USA); 1983	Northern Sea	Northern Dancer
Dam Miss Simpatia (ARG) 1998	Southern Halo (USA); 1983	Northern Sea	Sea Saga
Dam Miss Simpatia (ARG) 1998	Miss Peggy (ARG); 1988	Fitzcarraldo (ARG)	Cipayo
Dam Miss Simpatia (ARG) 1998	Miss Peggy (ARG); 1988	Fitzcarraldo (ARG)	Stall Only
Dam Miss Simpatia (ARG) 1998	Miss Peggy (ARG); 1988	Miss Bimba	Our Talisman
Dam Miss Simpatia (ARG) 1998	Miss Peggy (ARG); 1988	Miss Bimba	Miss Venecia
