= Stuka (horse) =

American-bred Thoroughbred racehorse

- Sire: Jade Hunter
- Grandsire: Mr. Prospector
- Dam: Caerleon's Success
- Damsire: Caerleon
- Sex: Stallion
- Foaled: 1990
- Country: United States
- Colour: Chestnut
- Breeder: Allen E. Paulson
- Owner: Allen E. Paulson
- Trainer: Gary F. Jones
- Record: 17: 5-1-3
- Earnings: US$916,175

Major wins
- Hollywood Prevue Breeders' Cup Stakes (1992); Santa Anita Handicap (1994); Skywalker Handicap (1994)

Stuka (foaled February 23, 1990 in Kentucky) is an American Thoroughbred racehorse best known for winning the Grade I Santa Anita Handicap at Santa Anita Park in Arcadia, California.

Bred and raced by Allen Paulson, Stuka's sire was the multiple Grade 1 winner, Jade Hunter, his dam was Caerleon's Success, a daughter of Caerleon, the 1988 and 1991 Leading sire in Great Britain and Ireland.

Stuka was trained by Gary Jones.

Retired after the 1994 racing season, Stuka was sold to South American interests and has had a successful career at stud in Chile where he stands at Haras Don Alberto. As at October 30, 2011 he has sired 45 stakes winners.

== Pedigree ==
Pedigree of Stuka
Sire Jade Hunter	Mr. Prospector	Raise a Native	Native Dancer
Sire Jade Hunter	Mr. Prospector	Raise a Native	Raise You
Sire Jade Hunter	Mr. Prospector	Gold Digger	Nashua
Sire Jade Hunter	Mr. Prospector	Gold Digger	Sequence
Sire Jade Hunter	Jadana	Pharly	Lyphard
Sire Jade Hunter	Jadana	Pharly	Comely
Sire Jade Hunter	Jadana	Janina	Match
Sire Jade Hunter	Jadana	Janina	Jennifer
Dam Caerleon's Success	Caerleon	Nijinsky	Northern Dancer
Dam Caerleon's Success	Caerleon	Nijinsky	Flaming Page
Dam Caerleon's Success	Caerleon	Foreseer	Round Table
Dam Caerleon's Success	Caerleon	Foreseer	Regal Gleam
Dam Caerleon's Success	Sound of Success	Successor	Bold Ruler
Dam Caerleon's Success	Sound of Success	Successor	Misty Morn
Dam Caerleon's Success	Sound of Success	Belle Musique	Tudor Minstrel
Dam Caerleon's Success	Sound of Success	Belle Musique	Bellesoeur
