= Girvin =

American-bred Thoroughbred racehorse (2014–2026)

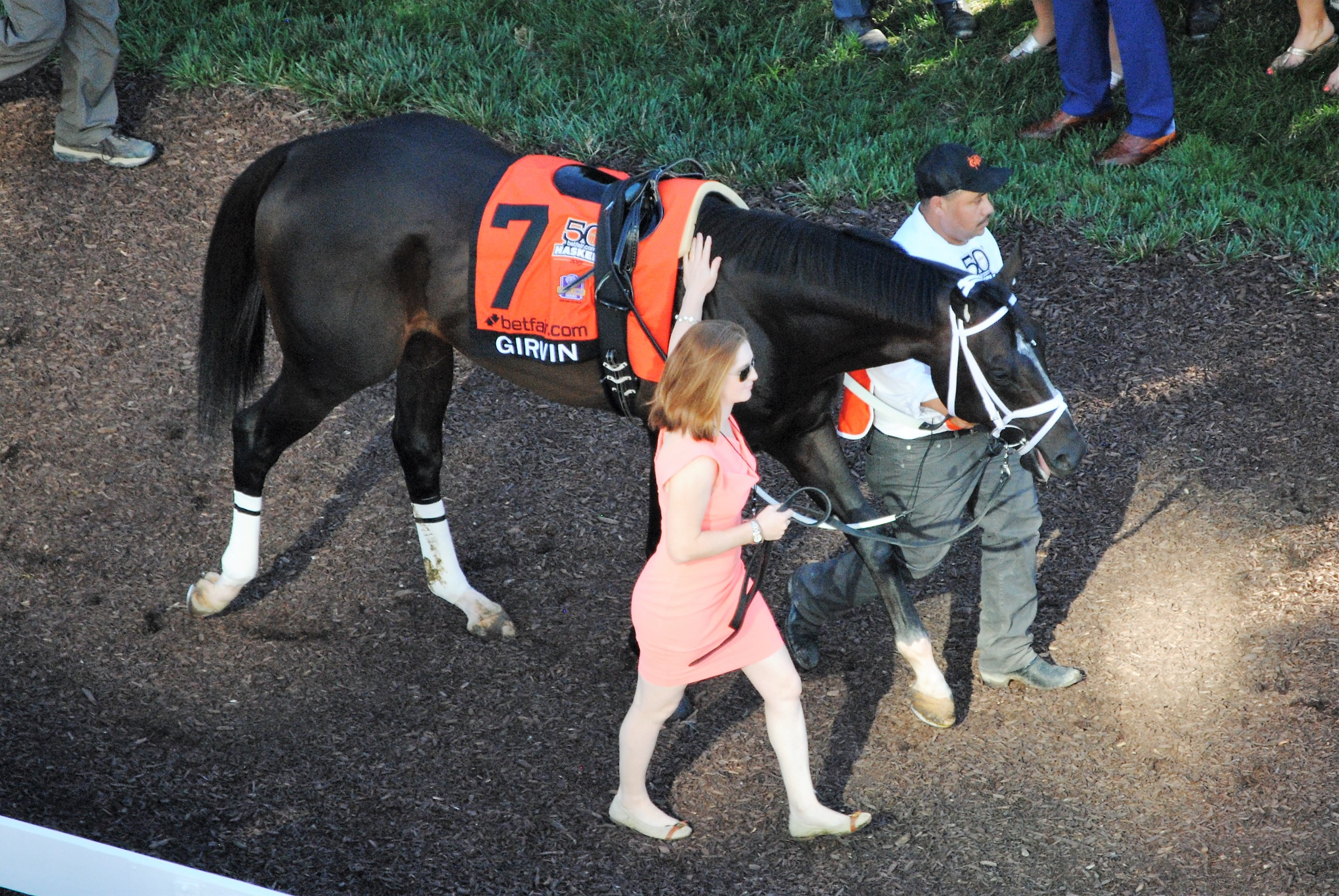
- Girvin in the walking ring before the 2017 Haskell Invitational at Monmouth Park
- Sire: Tale of Ekati
- Grandsire: Tale of the Cat
- Dam: Catch the Moon
- Damsire: Malibu Moon
- Sex: Stallion
- Foaled: March 31, 2014
- Died: August 8, 2026 (aged 12)
- Country: United States
- Color: Dark bay or brown
- Breeder: Bob Austin & John Witte
- Owner: Brad Grady
- Trainer: Joe Sharp
- Record: 7:4-2-0
- Earnings: $1,574,400

Major wins
- Risen Star Stakes (2017); Louisiana Derby (2017); Haskell Invitational Stakes (2017)

Girvin (March 31, 2014 – August 8, 2026) was an American Thoroughbred racehorse who won the 2017 Louisiana Derby and Haskell Invitational. He was the holder of the highest point ranking for the 2017 Road to the Kentucky Derby.

== Background ==
Girvin was a dark bay or brown colt who was bred in Kentucky by Bob Austin and John Witte. Austin won a free breeding session to the stallion Tale of Ekati, a grandson of both Storm Cat and Sunday Silence, by throwing a dart in a party game hosted by Darby Dan Farm. Tale of Ekati's major wins came in the Wood Memorial and Cigar Mile and he entered stud in 2011 for a fee of $15,000. To take advantage of the breeding session, Austin and Witte purchased an unraced mare named Catch the Moon for $30,000. She was sired by Malibu Moon, who is also the sire of 2013 Kentucky Derby winner Orb. Girvin was Catch the Moon's second foal. Her first, named Cocked and Loaded, was also a stakes winner.

He was purchased as a yearling for $130,000 by Brad Grady's Grand Oaks farm at the 2015 Fasig-Tipton fall sale. Grady, the owner of a company that leases equipment for the oil and gas industry, is a relative newcomer to horse racing. He purchased the 415-acre (168 ha) Grand Oaks farm in 2012. Grady originally intended to re-sell the then-unnamed colt as a two-year-old-in-training but the horse suffered a minor setback that kept him from the sale. Instead, Grady kept the colt, who he named for his hometown in Texas. Girvin is Grady's first stakes-winning horse.

Girvin is trained by Joe Sharp, who began his training career in 2014 after serving as an assistant to Michael Maker. He was one of Sharp's first clients.

== Racing career ==
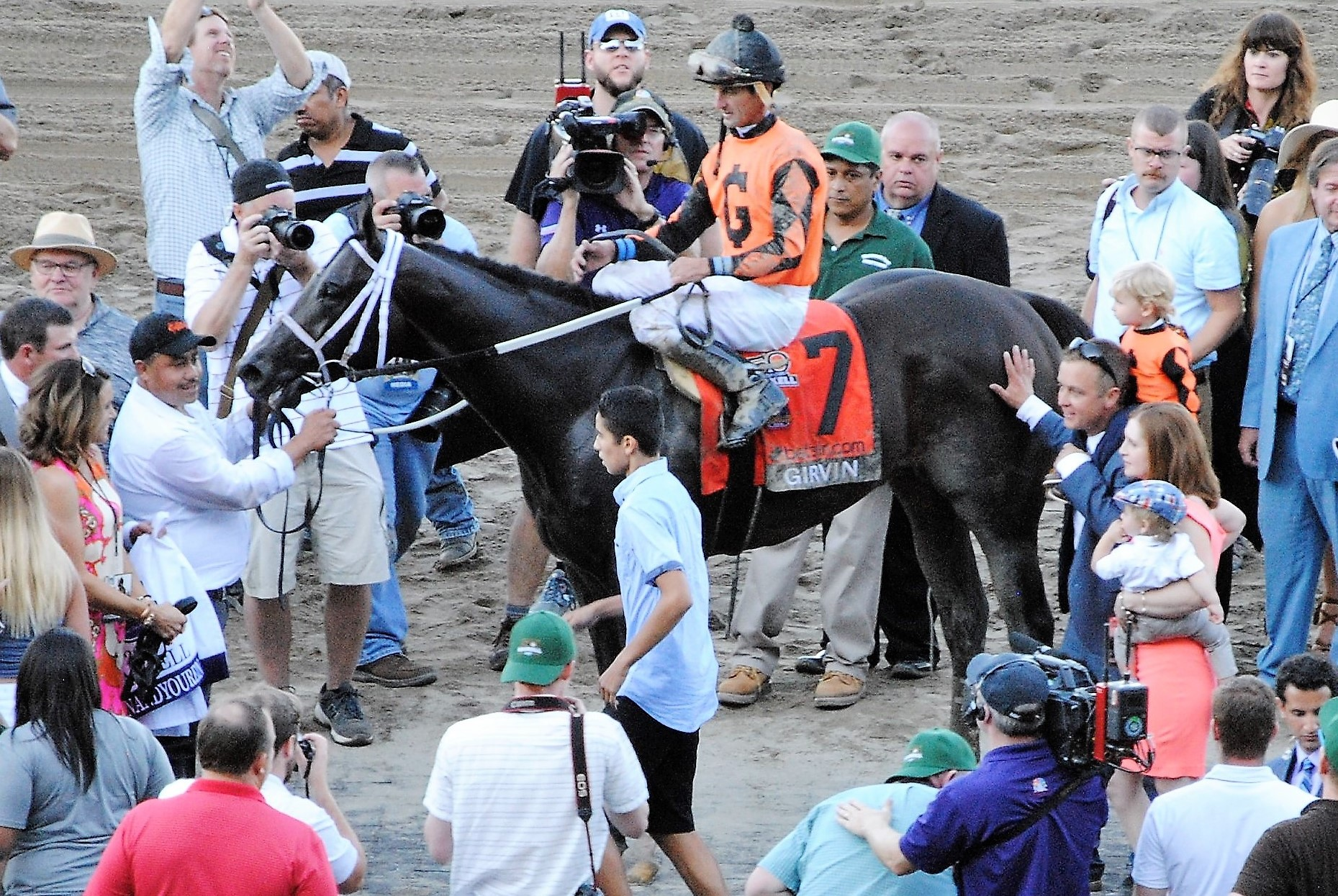
Girvin and his connections after winning the Haskell Invitational

In his first four races, Girvin ran only at the Fair Grounds in New Orleans, Louisiana. As a two-year-old, Girvin only raced once, winning a maiden special weight race by a neck in December 2016 at The Fair Grounds, defeating a field of 11 with jockey Brian Hernandez Jr. Trainer Joe Sharp next planned to move Girvin up to face graded stakes race horses in the Lecomte Stakes but was unable to ship from the Evangeline Training Center to Fair Grounds because of a quarantine due to equine herpesvirus. Instead, Girvin made his second start in early February 2017 in the Keith Gee Memorial Overnight Stakes, where he switched from dirt to turf, and finished a game second in the one mile race, 3/4 of a length behind the winner and fending off the third-place finisher by a neck.

Girvin was next entered in the Grade II Risen Star Stakes on February 25. Largely overlooked at odds of 8-1, he was bumped at the start, swapped leads multiple times in the homestretch but still won by two lengths. His time of 1:43.08 for 1 1/16 miles was considered respectable, ranking as the third fastest running of the Risen Star in the past 15 years. His win was a surprise to racing pundits, as he defeated the winners of both the Lecomte and Remsen Stakes. Sharp commented, "We believed in this horse all along, but you never know how good they are until you stack them up against the competition... We're in shock."

His final prep race was the $1,000,000 Louisiana Derby on April 1. There he won over a field of nine by 1 1/4 lengths while on the outside for much of the race. With 150 points on the 2017 Road to the Kentucky Derby leaderboard, he became the top-ranked contender in the field. "It doesn't feel bad (to have a Kentucky Derby horse)," said Sharp. "He's a talented horse. We're enjoying the ride. It's great connections and a great owner and it has been a real team effort."

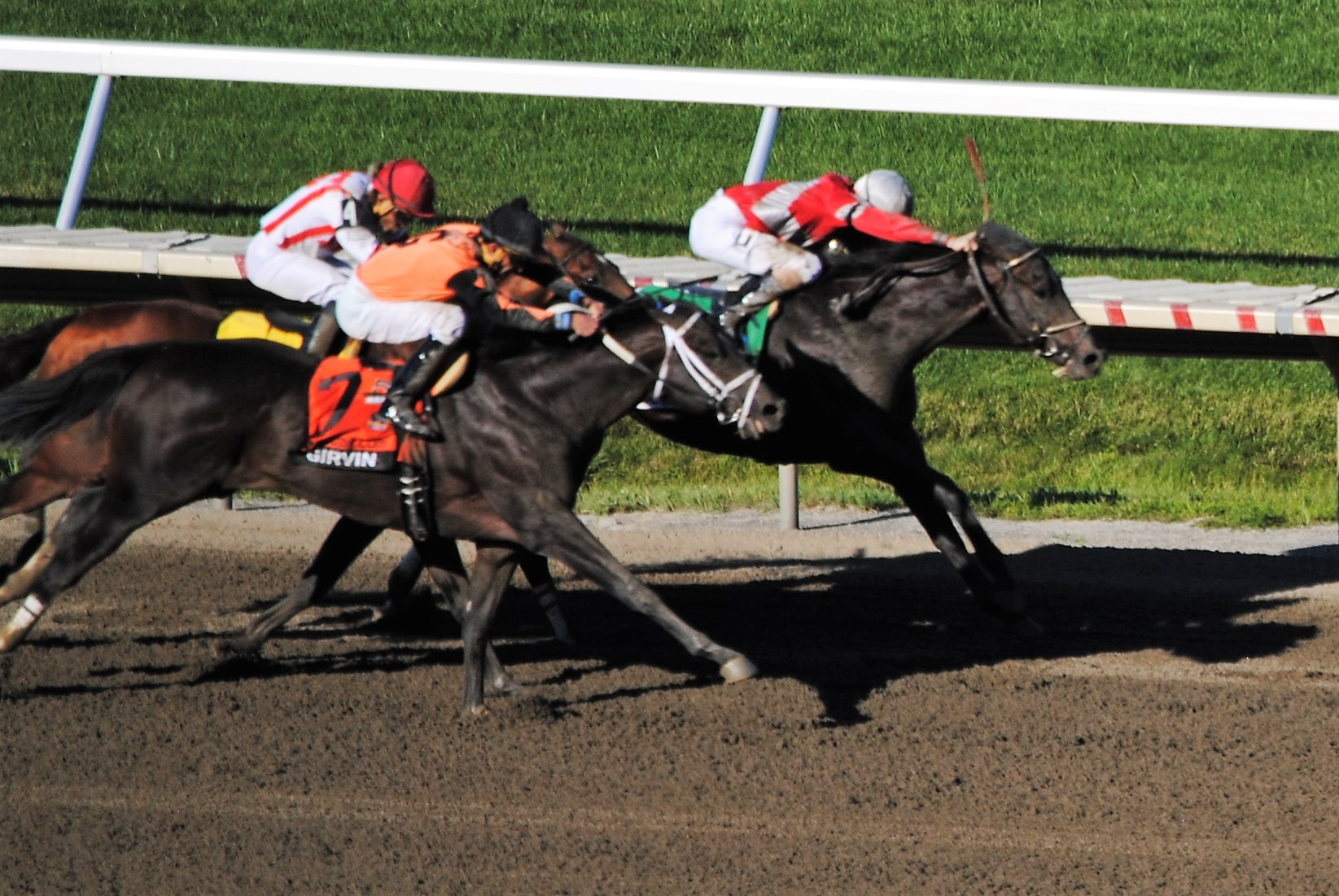
Nearing the finish line of the Haskell Invitational, McCraken on the rail had a narrow lead but Girvin closed ground on the outside and won in a photo finish

Going into the 2017 Kentucky Derby, Hernandez chose a different horse for the race owing to having a longer business relationship with that horse's connections, so Mike Smith was contracted to ride the colt. Smith's agent had contacted Sharp, stating, "I had been following [Girvin] and his consistency is very attractive...Mastery was our Derby horse and as soon as he was injured, Joe was the first person I called." Girvin also was noticed by the pundits because his morning exercise rider was retired jockey and two-time Kentucky Oaks winner Rosie Napravnik, who was also Sharp's wife and assistant trainer. Overall, because the colt has beaten mostly unknown competition at the Fair Grounds, his chances in the race were difficult to assess. The colt's tendency to switch leads more than he needed to was viewed as a potential concern, but he was praised for his long stride and toughness.

In late April, Girvin's training for the Kentucky Derby was disrupted when he developed a quarter crack on his right front hoof. Rather than jogging on the racetrack, Sharp maintained the horse's fitness by using a hyperbaric chamber and equine swimming facilities and remained hopeful that the colt would be able to run. "As long as he's able to breeze and come out of it well, he'll run in the Derby." Girvin entered the race and on a sloppy track, finished 13th.

He returned to the track on June 24 in the Ohio Derby, where he was second by a nose to Irap. Then, on July 30, he entered the Haskell Invitational at odds of 9-1. Sharp had stated to the press that the horse had been training very well. Ridden by another new jockey, Robby Albarado, Girvin trailed by nine lengths before putting in a stretch run and defeating favorite McCraken and Brian Hernandez in a photo finish, also defeating other top 3-year-olds such as Irish War Cry and Practical Joke.

== Stud career ==
After retirement Girvin began his stud career at the O'Farrell family's Ocala Stud for a fee of $7,500.

In 2023, Girvin relocated to Airdrie Stud.

=== Notable progeny ===
c = colt, f = filly, g = gelding

Foaled	Name	Sex	Major Wins
2020	Faiza	f	Starlet Stakes
2020	Dorth Vader	f	Ogden Phipps Stakes
2020	Damon's Mound	c	Saratoga Special Stakes

== Pedigree ==
Pedigree of Girvin (USA), bay colt, 2014
Sire Tale of Ekati (USA) 2005	Tale of the Cat (USA); 1994	Storm Cat	Storm Bird
Sire Tale of Ekati (USA) 2005	Tale of the Cat (USA); 1994	Storm Cat	Terlingua
Sire Tale of Ekati (USA) 2005	Tale of the Cat (USA); 1994	Yarn	Mr. Prospector
Sire Tale of Ekati (USA) 2005	Tale of the Cat (USA); 1994	Yarn	Narrate
Sire Tale of Ekati (USA) 2005	Silence Beauty (JPN); 1997	Sunday Silence	Halo
Sire Tale of Ekati (USA) 2005	Silence Beauty (JPN); 1997	Sunday Silence	Wishing Well
Sire Tale of Ekati (USA) 2005	Silence Beauty (JPN); 1997	Maplejinsky	Nijinsky II
Sire Tale of Ekati (USA) 2005	Silence Beauty (JPN); 1997	Maplejinsky	Gold Beauty
Dam Catch the Moon (USA) 2009	Malibu Moon (USA); 1997	A.P. Indy	Seattle Slew
Dam Catch the Moon (USA) 2009	Malibu Moon (USA); 1997	A.P. Indy	Weekend Surprise
Dam Catch the Moon (USA) 2009	Malibu Moon (USA); 1997	Macoumba	Mr Prospector
Dam Catch the Moon (USA) 2009	Malibu Moon (USA); 1997	Macoumba	Maximova
Dam Catch the Moon (USA) 2009	Catch My Fancy (USA); 2003	Yes It's True	Is It True
Dam Catch the Moon (USA) 2009	Catch My Fancy (USA); 2003	Yes It's True	Clever Monique
Dam Catch the Moon (USA) 2009	Catch My Fancy (USA); 2003	Walk Away Rene	Gold Alert
Dam Catch the Moon (USA) 2009	Catch My Fancy (USA); 2003	Walk Away Rene	Monique Rene (family A1)

Girvin does not have significant inbreeding until the fourth generation of his pedigree and beyond. He is 4x5x4x5 to Mr. Prospector, 4x5 to Monique Rene, 5x5 each to Northern Dancer, Secretariat, Raise a Native, and Gold Digger.

== Death ==
Girvin died on August 8, 2026, at the age of 12.
