= Bob Hope Stakes =

American Thoroughbred horse race

- Class: Listed
- Location: Del Mar Racetrack; Del Mar, California, United States
- Inaugurated: 1981 (as Hollywood Prevue Stakes at Hollywood Park)
- Race type: Thoroughbred - Flat racing
- Website: Del Mar

Race information
- Distance: 7 furlongs
- Surface: Dirt
- Track: left-handed
- Qualification: Two-year-olds
- Weight: 124 lbs. with allowances
- Purse: $100,000

The Bob Hope Stakes is a Listed American Thoroughbred horse race for two-year-olds over a distance of seven furlongs on the dirt track scheduled annually in November at Del Mar Racetrack in Del Mar, California. The event currently carries a purse of $100,000.

== History ==
The event was inaugurated on 14 November 1981 as the Hollywood Prevue Stakes at Hollywood Park Racetrack and was won by the undefeated Sepulveda who was trained by the US Hall of Fame trainer D. Wayne Lukas and ridden by the US Hall of Fame jockey Chris McCarron in a time of 1:22 flat.

In 1985 the event was classified as Grade III.

Between 1990 and 1995, the Breeders' Cup sponsored the event which reflected in the name of the event.

From 2006 to 2014 it was held on a synthetic dirt surface.

With the closure of Hollywood Park Racetrack in 2013 the event was renamed to the Bob Hope Stakes and moved to Del Mar Racetrack. Actor Bob Hope, frequented the Del Mar racetrack often and made seven "Road" musical comedy movies with Bing Crosby, who was the Del Mar Turf Club original president and de facto publicist.

In 2025 the event was downgraded by the Thoroughbred Owners and Breeders Association to Listed status.

== Records ==
Speed record:

- 1:20.63 - Lion Heart (2003)

Margins:

- 8 3/4 lengths – Nyros (2023)

Most wins by a jockey:

- 5 - Victor Espinoza (2000, 2004, 2014, 2017, 2020)

Most wins by a trainer:

- 13 - Bob Baffert (1996, 1997, 1998, 2007, 2011, 2012, 2004, 2015, 2016, 2018, 2019, 2021, 2022, 2023)

Most wins by an owner:

- 4 - Michael E. Pegram (1997, 2012, 2015, 2022)

== Winners ==
Year	Winner	Jockey	Trainer	Owner	Distance	Time	Purse	Grade	Ref
At Del Mar – Bob Hope Stakes
2025	Race not held (Note: Bob Hope Stakes canceled due to lack of lack entries)								
2024	Bullard	Umberto Rispoli	Michael W. McCarthy	St. Elias Stable, Talla Racing LLC, Three Chimneys Farm and West Point Thoroughbreds	7 furlongs	1:22.55	$100,000	III	
2023	Nysos	Flavien Prat	Bob Baffert	Baoma Corp	7 furlongs	1:21.71	$98,000	III	
2022	Havnameltdown	Juan J. Hernandez	Bob Baffert	Karl Watson, Michael E. Pegram & Paul Weitman	7 furlongs	1:21.68	$100,000	III	
2021	Messier	Flavien Prat	Bob Baffert	SF Racing, Starlight Racing & Madaket Stables	7 furlongs	1:22.74	$98,000	III	
2020	Red Flag	Victor Espinoza	John Shirreffs	Jerome S. & Tina Moss	7 furlongs	1:23.56	$100,500	III	
2019	High Velocity	Drayden Van Dyke	Bob Baffert	Gary & Mary West	7 furlongs	1:23.16	$98,000	III	
2018	Mucho Gusto	Joseph Talamo	Bob Baffert	Michael Lund Petersen	7 furlongs	1:23.51	$100,000	III	
2017	Greyvitos	Victor Espinoza	Adam Kitchingman	Triple B Farms	7 furlongs	1:22.20	$100,345	III	
2016	Mastery	Mike E. Smith	Bob Baffert	Cheyenne Stables	7 furlongs	1:23.32	$100,000	III	
2015	Toews On Ice	Martin Garcia	Bob Baffert	Karl Watson, Michael E. Pegram & Paul Weitman	7 furlongs	1:22.27	$100,500	III	
2014	No Problem	Victor Espinoza	Michael W. McCarthy	P and G Stables	7 furlongs	1:23.48	$100,750	III	
At Hollywood Park – Hollywood Prevue Stakes
2013	Shared Belief	Corey Nakatani	Jerry Hollendorfer	Jungle Racing, Jerry Hollendorfer, Alex Solis II, Jason Litt & George Todaro	7 furlongs	1:22.17	$100,000	III	
2012	Really Mr Greely	Julien R. Leparoux	Bob Baffert	Karl Watson, Michael E. Pegram & Paul Weitman	7 furlongs	1:22.84	$100,000	III	
2011	So Brilliant	Martin Garcia	Bob Baffert	Arnold Zetcher	7 furlongs	1:22.96	$100,000	III	
2010	Premier Pegasus	Alonso Quinonez	Cho Myung Kwon	Cho Myung Kwon	7 furlongs	1:22.78	$100,000	III	
2009	American Lion	Julien R. Leparoux	Eoin G. Harty	WinStar Farm	7 furlongs	1:22.49	$100,000	III	
2008	Jack o' Lantern	Isaias D. Enriquez	Richard P. Matlow	Purple Shamrock Racing & Bruce Chandler	7 furlongs	1:21.89	$103,700	III	
2007	Massive Drama	Kent J. Desormeaux	Bob Baffert	Zayat Stables	7 furlongs	1:21.48	$109,200	III	
2006	§ Belgravia	Julien R. Leparoux	Patrick L. Biancone	Zayat Stables, Derrick Smith, Mrs. John Magnier & Michael Tabor	7 furlongs	1:22.42	$100,000	III	
2005	Your Tent Or Mine	Pat Valenzuela	Neil D. Drysdale	Anthony Speelman	7 furlongs	1:21.12	$100,000	III	
2004	Declan's Moon	Victor Espinoza	Ronald W. Ellis	Jay Em Ess Stable	7 furlongs	1:21.74	$100,000	III	
2003	Lion Heart	Mike E. Smith	Patrick L. Biancone	Derrick Smith & Michael Tabor	7 furlongs	1:20.63	$100,000	III	
2002	Roll Hennessy Roll	Alex O. Solis	Rafael Becerra	Stan E. Fulton	7 furlongs	1:22.68	$125,000	III	
2001	Fonz's	Laffit Pincay Jr.	David La Croix	Gene Anderson & Meadowbrook Farm	7 furlongs	1:22.03	$100,000	III	
2000	Proud Tower	Victor Espinoza	Jose Luna Silva	Tricar Stables	7 furlongs	1:23.01	$100,000	III	
1999	Grey Memo	Matt S. Garcia	Warren Stute	Ron Manzani, Ridgeley Farm & Russ Sarno	7 furlongs	1:24.44	$100,000	III	
1998	Premier Property	David R. Flores	Bob Baffert	Hal J. Earnhardt III	7 furlongs	1:23.29	$100,000	III	
1997	Commitisize	David R. Flores	Bob Baffert	Michael E. Pegram	7 furlongs	1:21.64	$100,000	III	
1996	In Excessive Bull	Corey Nakatani	Bob Baffert	Hal J. Earnhardt III	7 furlongs	1:21.54	$101,700	III	
1995	Cobra King	Chris McCarron	Mike Puype	Betty Biszantz	7 furlongs	1:21.25	$103,175	III	
1994	Afternoon Deelites	Kent J. Desormeaux	Richard E. Mandella	Burt Bacharach	7 furlongs	1:20.98	$96,250	III	
1993	Individual Style	Chris Antley	Lin Wheeler	First Cabin Stable	7 furlongs	1:21.17	$89,225	III	
1992	Stuka	Pat Valenzuela	Gary F. Jones	Allen E. Paulson	7 furlongs	1:21.94	$107,350	III	
1991	Star of the Crop	Gary L. Stevens	Willard L. Proctor	Glen Hill Farm	7 furlongs	1:22.30	$102,700	III	
1990	Olympio	Eddie Delahoussaye	Ron McAnally	Verne Winchell	7 furlongs	1:21.80	$107,600	III	
1989	Individualist	Robbie Davis	David E. Hofmans	Golden Eagle Farm	7 furlongs	1:22.20	$80,350	III	
1988	King Glorious	Chris McCarron	Jerry Hollendorfer	Halo Farms	7 furlongs	1:21.20	$80,900	III	
1987	Race not held								
1986	Exclusive Enough	Bill Shoemaker	Jack Van Berg	Dorothy Scharbraur	7 furlongs	1:23.00	$79,650	III	
1985	Judge Smells	Chris McCarron	Thomas L. Walker	Calumet Farm	7 furlongs	1:23.00	$80,500	III	
1984	First Norman	Bill Shoemaker	Albert S. Barrera	Norman Silverman & Lazaro S. Barrera	7 furlongs	1:22.20	$108,700	Listed	
1983	† So Vague	Patricia Cooksey	Gerard M. Russell	Hyperion Thoroughbreds	7 furlongs	1:22.20	$121,300	Listed	
1982	Copelan	Jerry D. Bailey	Mitchell Griffin	Fred W. Hooper	7 furlongs	1:21.40	$107,850		
1981	Sepulveda	Chris McCarron	D. Wayne Lukas	Tartan Stable	7 furlongs	1:22.00	$78,357		

Legend:
All Weather Track Dirt
Notes:
§ Ran as an entry
† Field

== See also ==
List of American and Canadian Graded races
