= Albert Stall Jr. =

American horse trainer

Albert Stall, Jr.
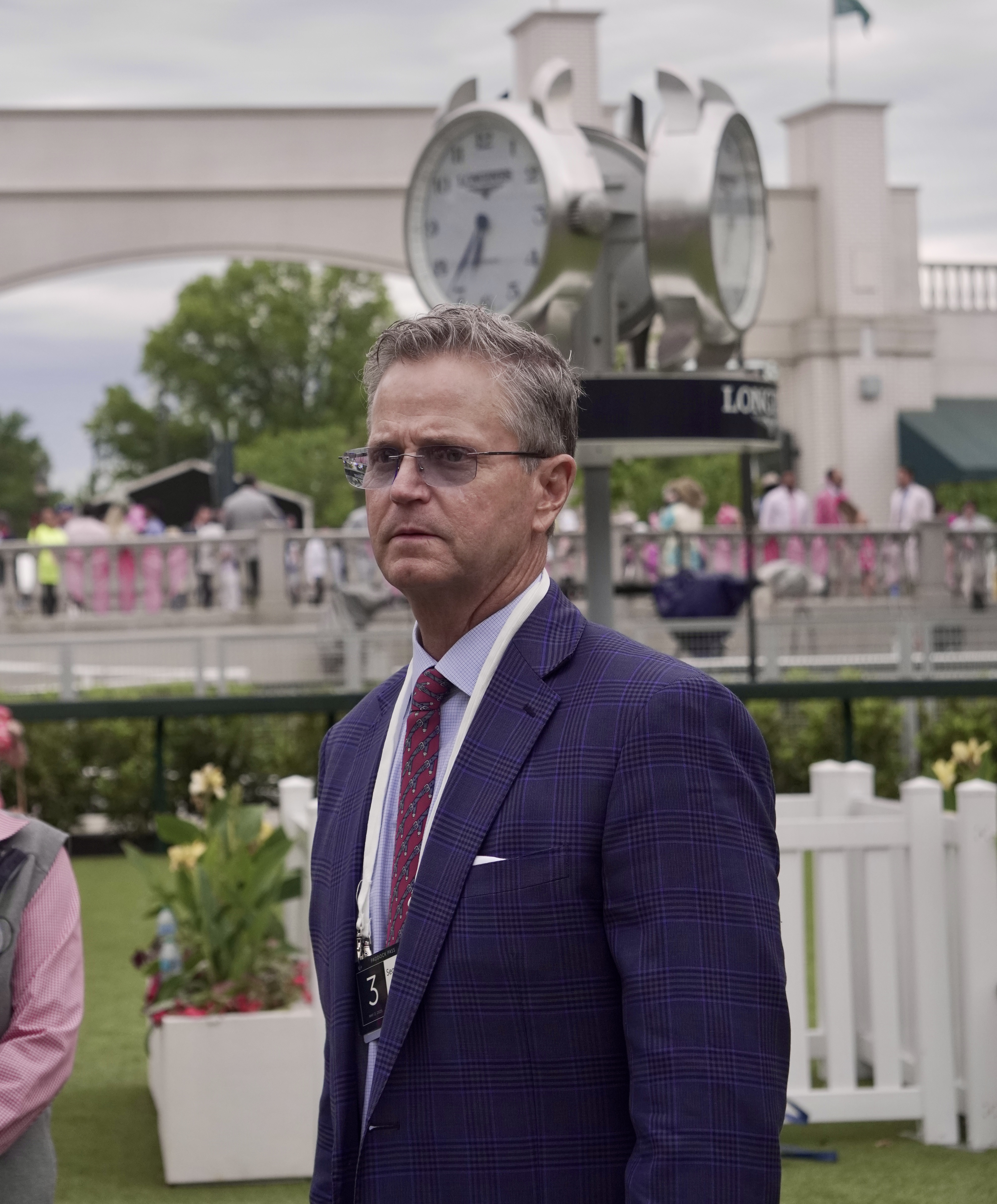
- Stall in the Paddock at Churchill Downs on Friday, May 2nd, 2025

Personal information
- Born: October 10, 1961 (age 64) New Orleans, Louisiana
- Occupation: Horse Trainer

Horse racing career
- Sport: Horse racing
- Career wins: 1,845 (as of July 12, 2026)

Major racing wins
- Razorback Handicap (1996); Turf Classic Stakes (1998); Explosive Bid Handicap (1998); Eatontown Stakes (1999); Hanshin Cup Handicap (2000, 2001); Round Table Stakes (2001); Edgewood Stakes (2003); Arlington-Washington Futurity Stakes (2008); Louisville Handicap (2008); Super Derby (2008, 2010, 2013); Clark Handicap (2009); Fayette Stakes (2009); Ack Ack Handicap (2010); Breeders' Futurity (2010); Stephen Foster Handicap (2010); Whitney Handicap (2010); William Donald Schaefer Stakes (2010); Black Gold Stakes (2011); Bourbon Stakes (2011); William Donald Schaefer Memorial Stakes (2011); Commonwealth Turf Stakes (2012); Pocahontas Stakes (2012); Golden Rod Stakes (2013); Illinois Derby (2013); West Virginia Derby (2013); Churchill Downs Stakes (2014); Firecracker Stakes (2015); Fleur de Lis Handicap (2016); Texas Mile Stakes (2016); Rushaway Stakes (2018) Breeders' Cup wins: Breeders' Cup Classic (2010)

Significant horses
- Blame, Tom's d'Etat, Departing, Joyeux Dancer, Star Guitar

Albert M. Stall, Jr. (born October 10, 1961 in New Orleans, Louisiana) is an American Thoroughbred horse racing trainer best known for winning the 2010 Breeders' Cup Classic in which his horse Blame defeated the great filly, Zenyatta.

== Early life ==
Al Stall Jr. is one of four children of Al Stall Sr. (died 2017), who was the chairman of the Louisiana Racing Commission for 18 years, and Susan Ellender Stall.

He first gained experience training racehorses by working with Frank Brothers during high school holidays before attending Louisiana State University where he graduated with a Bachelor of Science in Geology. He worked in the oil industry before becoming a trainer, starting as an assistant to Brothers for five years.

== Trainer ==
When Frank Brothers retired in late 2007, Stall became the primary trainer for the legendary Claiborne Farm in 2007 until 2016.

Stall won the 1,000th race of his career on May 23, 2010, at Arlington Park with Toll in the second race. His North American career earnings exceed $76 million with more than 1,800 wins through July 12, 2026.

His best year by earnings was when he finished 10th among all trainers in 2010, and his best year in wins was 2011 at 55th.

His top-earning horse was Blame with $4.36 million in earnings followed by Departing at $1.86 million, Tom's d'Etat at $1.76 million and Star Guitar at $1.74 million.

Stall has 43 graded stakes wins.

== Family ==
Stall and his wife Nicole have two children, Albert II and Greta.
