= Declan's Moon =

American-bred Thoroughbred racehorse

- Sire: Malibu Moon
- Grandsire: A. P. Indy
- Dam: Vee Vee star
- Damsire: Norquestor
- Sex: Gelding
- Foaled: 2002
- Country: United States
- Colour: Bay
- Breeder: Brice Ridgely
- Owner: Jay Em Ess Stables
- Trainer: Ronald W. Ellis
- Record: 18: 6-2-2
- Earnings: $705,647

Major wins
- Del Mar Futurity (2004); Hollywood Prevue Stakes (2004); Hollywood Futurity (2004); Santa Catalina Stakes (2005)

Awards
- American Champion Two-Year-Old (2004)

Declan's Moon (foaled 2002 in Maryland) is a retired American Champion Thoroughbred racehorse. He was the leading American two-year-old of 2004, a year in which he was undefeated. His subsequent career was restricted by injuries.

== Background ==
Foaled in Maryland, Declan's Moon was from the second crop of stallion Malibu Moon, whose second crop of foals also included eventual Gr.I winner Malibu Mint. His dam, Vee Vee Star, was graded stakes placed during her career, finishing second in the 1999 Black-Eyed Susan Stakes.

A "tall, rangy" gelding, Declan's Moon was bred by Brice Ridgely who named him after his grandson. Jay Em Ess Stable purchased Declan's Moon for $125,000 at the 2003 Fasig-Tipton Midlantic September yearling sale. Declan's Moon was conditioned for racing by Ron Ellis.

== Racing career ==
Declan's Moon won his debut as a two-year-old on July 31, 2004, at California's Del Mar Racetrack. He followed this with wins in the Grade II Del Mar Futurity and the Grade III Hollywood Prevue Stakes. The colt ended the season with a win in the Grade I Hollywood Futurity. His undefeated season resulted in Declan's Moon being voted the Eclipse Award as the American Champion Two-Year-Old of 2004.

Declan's Moon began his three-year-old season with a win in the March 5, 2005, Santa Catalina Stakes and was the early favorite for the Kentucky Derby until a knee injury sidelined him for several months. Back in training in the fall, Declan's Moon sustained a fracture at the top of his cannon bone that kept him out of racing until July 2006, when he returned to finish a solid second in a non-stakes event at Hollywood Park Racetrack. However, the colt was beaten again in his ensuing four starts, finishing last in three of them. He did not win another race until July 2007, when he captured a six-furlong minor event at Hollywood Park. This was his last win, and he was retired with a record of one win in his final thirteen starts.

== Retirement ==
Declan's Moon was retired to Merryland Farm in Bel Air, Maryland.

In late 2012, Declan's Moon was one of four retired Thoroughbred race horses to be selected for the Retired Racehorse Training Project's "100 Day Challenge" designed to demonstrate the versatility of Thoroughbreds by introducing them to new equestrian disciplines, including dressage, eventing, equitation, show jumping, and foxhunting. At the end of the challenge, in March 2013, Declan's Moon, the 2004 Eclipse Award-winning, undefeated two-year-old by Malibu Moon, was voted in a landslide the horse best suited for dressage. He represented Country Life Farm and is owned by Samantha Siegel of Jay Em Ess Racing. "Declan's Moon's incredible movement shatters the myth that the racing industry no longer produces horses suited for sport at the top levels," said RRTP founder and president Steuart Pittman. "He was not only the fastest horse of his crop, but is also exactly what sport horse breeders are trying to produce for the show ring."
