= Blame (horse) =

American-bred Thoroughbred racehorse

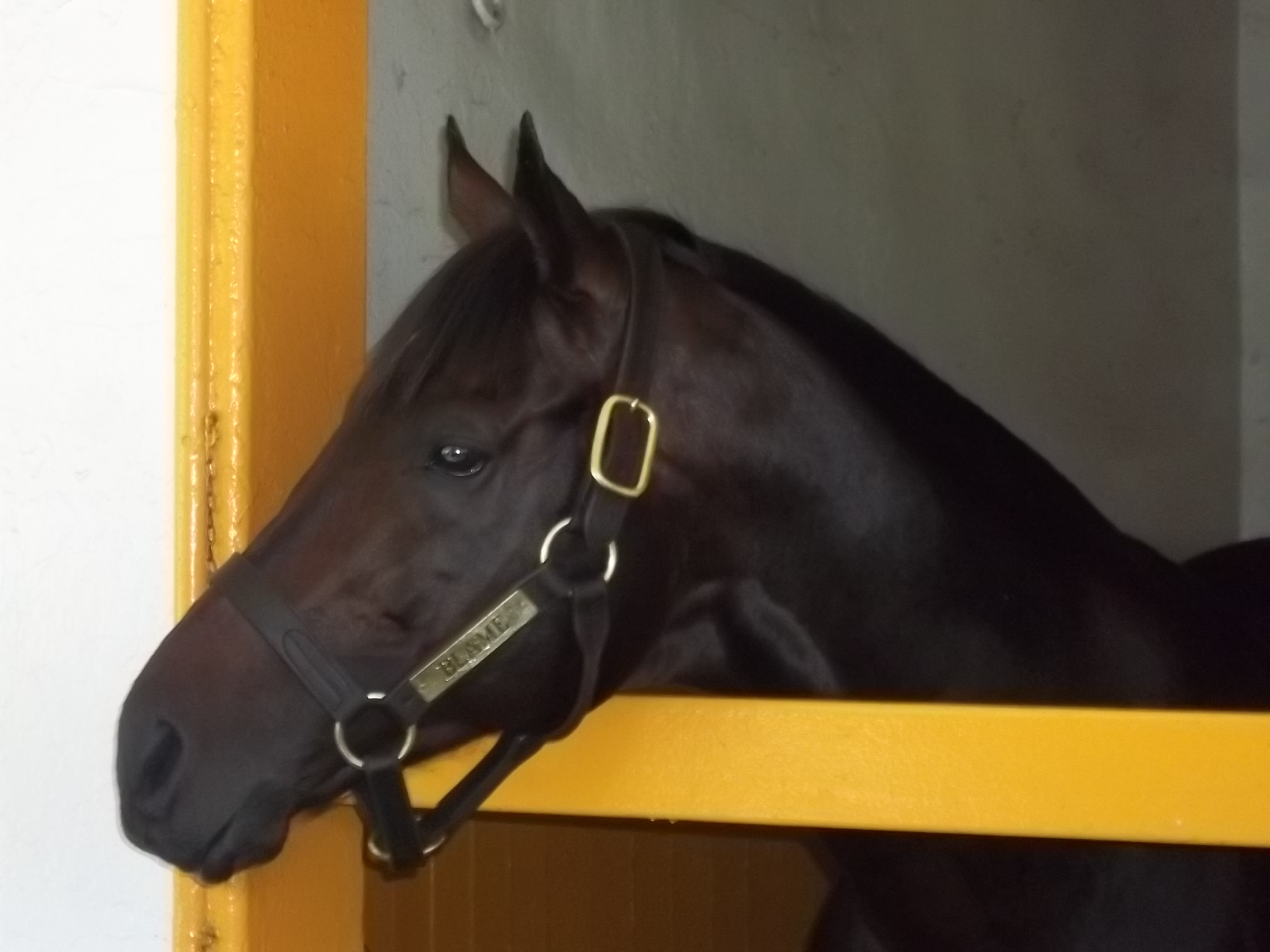
- Blame in July 2014
- Sire: Arch
- Grandsire: Kris S.
- Dam: Liable
- Damsire: Seeking the Gold
- Sex: Stallion
- Foaled: 2006
- Country: United States
- Colour: Dark Bay
- Breeder: Claiborne Farm & Adele B. Dilschneider
- Owner: Claiborne Farm & Adele B. Dilschneider
- Trainer: Albert Stall Jr.
- Record: 13: 9-2-2
- Earnings: $4,368,214

Major wins
- Fayette Stakes (2009); Curlin Stakes (2009); Clark Handicap (2009); William Donald Schaefer Handicap (2010); Stephen Foster Handicap (2010); Whitney Stakes (2010); Breeders' Cup Classic (2010)

Awards
- American Champion Older Male Horse (2010)

Honours
- NTRA "Moment of the Year" (2010); Blame Stakes at Churchill Downs (2020–)
- Last updated on 20 March 2023

Blame (foaled May 2, 2006) is a retired American Thoroughbred racehorse, who won nine races in 13 starts, including the Breeders' Cup Classic.

He never finished out of the money in his racing career; along with his nine wins, he finished second twice and third twice. After being retired at the end of 2010, he was sent to stud at Claiborne Farm.

== Background ==
Blame is a dark bay homebred stallion owned by Claiborne Farm in association with Adele B. Dilschneider. He was sired by Claiborne's Arch out of the Seeking the Gold mare Liable (the 2010 Kentucky Broodmare of the Year). He was trained during his racing career by Albert Stall Jr. and partnered with veteran jockey Garrett Gomez during his 2010 championship season.

== Race record ==
=== 2008: two-year-old season ===
Blame made his racing debut as a two-year-old on September 13, 2008, with Lindey Wade aboard at Turfway Park in Florence, Kentucky, where he ran third in a maiden special weight race.

In his next start on October 17, with Jamie Theriot aboard, Blame broke his maiden in a maiden special weight race over seven furlongs at Keeneland in Lexington, Kentucky. Blame came from seven lengths back, making a five-wide move down the stretch to defeat Flying Warrior by a length, winning $31,225 of the $50,000 purse.

His winnings for his two-race season totaled $33,425.

=== 2009: three-year-old season ===
Blame began 2009 by finishing third in an allowance race with Garrett Gomez again aboard on June 12 at Churchill Downs, three lengths behind winner Guam Typhoon. He followed that with a win in an allowance race on July 2 at Churchill Downs with Jamie Theriot again aboard. That was the first of five consecutive races with Theriot aboard Blame, in which Blame would capture four wins and one second. Blame made his stakes debut on August 2 a winning one in the $79,750 Curlin Stakes at Saratoga Race Course. Blame was third until he made a rail move down the stretch to win by 3/4 of a length over Gone Astray, followed by Guam Typhoon, who had beaten Blame in an earlier race.

Blame then started in the Grade II $750,000 Super Derby held at Louisiana Downs on September 19, finishing second behind Regal Ransom, who won by 1 1/4 lengths. He then notched his first graded stakes win in the 1 1/8 mile, Grade II $150,000 Fayette Stakes at Keeneland on October 31, coming from third place with a five-wide move to win by 1 1/4 lengths over Parading. Blame ended his 2009 racing year with another win, in the Grade II $460,600 Clark Handicap at Churchill Downs on November 27. He defeated Misremembered by a neck and multiple Grade I winner Einstein.

His 2009 winnings totaled $583,322 in six starts, with four firsts, one second and one third.

=== 2010: four-year-old season ===
Garrett Gomez was aboard for all five of Blame's races in 2010. Blame made his 2010 debut a winning one on May 2 when he captured the 1 1/16 miles Grade III $100,000 William Donald Schaefer Handicap at Pimlico Race Course on Preakness Stakes day. Blame defeated No Advantage by 1 1 1/2 lengths. On June 12, Blame won the $671,770 Stephen Foster Handicap at Churchill Downs, wearing down favored Battle Plan in the final strides to win by 3/4 of a length and score his first Grade I win. Following the Stephen Foster, Blame was pointed to the $750,000 Whitney Handicap at Saratoga for an anticipated showdown with Metropolitan Handicap and Donn Handicap winner Quality Road. On August 7, Blame defeated favored Quality Road by a head in a field that also included 2009 Kentucky Derby winner Mine That Bird, Musket Man and Haynesfield.

Blame's next race was October 2 in the $750,000 Jockey Club Gold Cup at Belmont Park, in which winner Haynesfield set a moderate and uncontested pace. Blame ran second, four lengths back. In the 2010 Breeders' Cup Classic on November 6 at Churchill Downs, Blame became the only horse to beat champion and fan favorite Zenyatta, holding off the previously 19-0 mare by a nose. Along with Blame and Zenyatta, the field included 2010 Preakness Stakes winner Lookin At Lucky, Preakness runner-up First Dude, Haynesfield and Quality Road. With much of the pre-race attention focused on Zenyatta, the race was watched by approximately 3.1 million TV viewers on ESPN, nearly triple the ratings of the previous year's race.

Blame was named Champion Older Male for 2010 in the Eclipse Award voting. He finished a close second to Zenyatta in the Eclipse voting for Horse of the Year, receiving 102 first-place votes to Zenyatta's 128. Blame received the majority of first-place votes cast by members of the Daily Racing Form, while Zenyatta fared best with voters of the National Turf Writers and Broadcasters and the National Thoroughbred Racing Association. He was racing's leading money-winner among North American thoroughbreds in 2010 with $3.75 million earned in only five starts, ahead of Lookin at Lucky ($2.06 million in seven starts) and Zenyatta ($1.83 million in six starts).

== Stud record ==
=== Notable progeny ===
c = colt, f = filly, g = gelding

Foaled	Name	Sex	Major wins
2014	Fault	f	Santa Margarita Stakes
2014	Marlets Freedom	f	Ballerina Stakes
2014	Senga	f	Prix de Diane
2018	Nadal	c	Arkansas Derby
2020	Wet Paint	f	Coaching Club American Oaks
2021	Sibiyan	g	Preis von Europa
2023	Explora	f	Test Stakes

=== 2011–2012 ===
After Blame's Breeders' Cup Classic win in 2010, he was retired from racing to stand at stud at Claiborne Farm in Paris, Kentucky, with his stud fee set at $35,000. His first foal was born on January 13, 2012, to stakes-winning Irish-bred Promptly, at Derry Meeting Farm in Cochranville, Pennsylvania.

His first-in-foal mares brought up to $800,000 at the 2011 Keeneland November sale, and in 2012 he had a first-crop weanling sell for $320,000. In 2012 at the Keeneland November Sale, his progeny sold for a $136,154 average. In 2012, Blame was bred to 104 mares.

=== 2013 ===
In August 2013, Blame led all first-crop sires at the Saratoga Select Yearling Sale with six yearlings sold for $1.36 million (a $226,667 average).

In 2013 at the annual Keeneland September Yearling Sale, Blame led first-crop sires by average as his 28 sires sold for an average of $194,357. Fourteen of Blame's progeny sold for at least $200,000. The top bid was for a Blame colt was out of Alchemist, which sold for $550,000. Four other colts brought between $300,000 and $365,000, three fillies brought between $250,000 and $285,000, and four fillies and two colts each brought between $200,000 and $240,000.

His stud fee for 2013 was $30,000, and for the year he was bred to 108 mares.

=== 2014 ===
Blame's stud fee for 2014 remained $30,000. Through March 11, 2014, Blame led all freshman 2-year-old sales sires for the year by average and by median ($300,000). For the 2014 season, Blame was ranked 12th among all first-crop sires with $477,326 in earnings, with 28 runners and eight winners. His top earner was the filly Don't Blame Me with $80,750 in winnings.

Blame's first winner came on June 19, 2014, in the first race at Santa Anita Park, a maiden special-weight race for 2-year-old fillies. Two-year-old bay filly Caval, by Blame out of Sultana (a Storm Cat mare) trained by Hall of Famer Jerry Hollendorfer, went off as an even-money favorite. With Elvis Trujillo aboard, Caval won the five-furlong race by 5 1/2 lengths in a near-track record time of :56.78, .05 seconds from the track record, winning $33,600. Caval was bred in Kentucky by Tada Nobutaka and sold for $150,000 as a Keeneland September yearling.

The week prior to Caval's win, on June 13 at Belmont Park, Blame It On Chris, a bay colt by Blame out of Bayou Bride, posted a third-place finish in his first start, a five-furlong maiden special-weight race for 2-year-olds. Three days after Caval's win, Blame filly Conquest Archangel out of Hot Attraction by Pulpit overcame a slow start to place second in a 4.5-furlong maiden special-weight race for 2-year-olds at Churchill Downs. Conquest Archangel followed that with another second on July 20 at Del Mar racetrack.

On July 13, two-year-old Blame filly Don't Blame Me finished second in her maiden race at Lincoln Race Course, just over a length behind the winner. At the one-day Fasig-Tipton July Sale of Selected Yearlings, a colt from Blame's second crop brought a final bid of $410,000—the second highest-priced individual of the sale.

During the weekend of September 26–28, Blame had three winners—one on each day across the country—Don't Blame Me (Santa Anita on Friday), Honest (Monmouth on Saturday), and No Fault of Mine (Arlington on Sunday).

For 2014, Blame was bred to 110 mares.

=== 2015 ===
On November 12, 2014, it was announced that Blame's stud fee would be lowered to $20,000 for 2015.

On February 7 a Blame colt, Far From Over, established himself as a Kentucky Derby contender with a dramatic win in the $250,000 Grade 3 Withers Stakes at Aqueduct. The colt stumbled out of the gate and spotted five other three-year-olds five lengths at the first call and 10 1/2 lengths after half a mile. He remained dead last for much of the race, still 9 1/2 lengths back with 5/16th of a mile remaining. He then made a bold move under jockey Manuel Franco and flashed home with a decisive win over 1-2 favorite El Kabeir. It was Far From Over's second win in two starts. However, five weeks prior to the Kentucky Derby, while prepping for the Grade 1 Wood Memorial, Far From Over suffered a hairline condylar fracture in his left hind leg that required surgery. It was reported that he could return for a fall 2015 campaign. He raced only four more times in 2015–2017, with one win and one second. He has not raced since 2017.

On April 4, a second Blame colt, March, won a Grade 3 race, the Bay Shore Stakes at Aqueduct. March followed that up on June 6 with a win in the Grade 2 Woody Stephens on the undercard of the Belmont Stakes. Through March's first five races, he had three wins and one second for $237,500 in total winnings.

=== 2016 ===
Claiborne Farm announced that Blame's stud fee for 2016 would be raised to $25,000. According to Daily Racing Form, "The 2010 Breeders’ Cup Classic winner and 9-year-old son of Arch's first runners are 3-year-olds of 2015, led by Grade 2 winner March, Grade 3 winners Far From Over and Onus, stakes winners Redstart and Exaggerated, and Grade 1-placed Chide and Blameitonthelaw."

As of Nov. 5, 2016, the highest-earning Blame progeny for a career was March with $606,800. For 2016, through Nov. 5 the top earner was Going For Broke at $291,200 followed by Queen Caroline with $258,463.

=== 2017 ===
In late 2016, Claiborne Farm announced that Blame's stud fee for 2017 would remain $25,000.

Blame got his first classic winner and first Grade 1/Group 1 winner on June 18 when his daughter Senga captured the G1 Prix de Diane (French Oaks), winning $639,854.

Blame's top earners for 2017 included: Firsthand Report ($215,000 in 6 starts); Fault ($194615 in 12 starts); and Daisy ($140,000 in three starts.

=== 2018 ===
As of 2018 Blame ranked second among all fifth-year sires, behind only Quality Road.

Fault, a 4-year-old daughter of Blame, captured the $400,000 Grade 1 Santa Margarita Stakes at Santa Anita on March 17, pulling away for a 6-and-a-half length win under jockey Geovanni Franco. The win was on a fast dirt track, and came on the heels of Fault winning the Grade 2 Santa Ana Stakes on turf at Santa Anita just a month earlier. Those two wins gave Fault a record of 5-3-2 in 15 races. However, after suffering an injury, Fault was retired and in November was sold to Shadai Farm for $1.2 million.

Marley's Freedom, a 4-year-old filly, captured the Grade 1 Ballerina Stakes at Saratoga, her third straight graded stakes win. Marley's Freedom went off as the odds-on favorite of the Breeders' Cup Filly & Mare Sprint at Churchill Downs in November. She got out of the gate slow with jockey Mike Smith aboard and then was hung out wide, but came on strong at the end to finish 4th, less than a length behind the winner.

Maraud, a 3-year-old Blame colt, also won a stakes race in March, the Grade 3 Palm Beach Stakes held at Gulfstream Park. Maraud also won the Grade 2 American Turf Stakes in May at Churchill Downs.

Blamed, a 3-year-old Blame filly, has five wins and a second in six lifetime starts, including three wins in 2018 at Sunland Park.

Beyond Blame, a 3-year-old filly, won the Grade 3 Regret Stakes in June at Churchill Downs and the $200,000 Indiana Grand Stakes in September.

Miss Kentucky, a 4-year-old filly, won the Grade 3 Winning Colors Stakes in May at Churchill Downs.

Senga, who captured the G1 Prix de Diane (French Oaks) and the G3 Prix de la Grotte in 10 starts for $781,854 in earnings in 2017, died at the age of 4 in 2018. She had been in foal to Irish-born Galileo.

For the year, Blame's progeny was ranked 21st among all sires in North America with 181 runners, including 103 winners, with largest earner Marley's Freedom with $718,550 in winnings for the year.

=== 2019 ===
After the 2018 success of Blame's progeny, Claiborne Farm raised Blame's 2019 stud fee to $30,000, up from $12,500.

As of November 2019, the statistical summary for Blames's progeny includes 552 foals (468 of racing age) with 626 wins (17 percent) and earnings of $26.7 million.

Marley's Freedom was again Blame's winningest progeny in 2019, winning the $200,000 Grade 2 Great Lady M Stakes and $200,000 Grade 2 Santa Monica Stakes, and second in both the $500,000 Grade 1 Humana Distaff Handicap and the $400,000 Grade 1 Beholder Mile Stakes. Marley's Freedom was picked to be of the early favorites in the 2019 Breeders Cup Filly & Mare Sprint, but it was announced in September that she would not start in that race.

Other winning progeny in 2019 include: Ms. Bad Behavior, $500,000 Grade 3 Three Chimneys Ladies Stakes; Blamed, $150,000 Grade 3 Royal Delta Stakes; Mrs. Sippy, $250,000 Grade 2 Glens Falls Stakes (and second in the $500,000 Grade 1 Flower Bowl Stakes); and Hollywood Critic, $97,000 optional claiming race. Maraud finished third in each of three races—the $150,000 Grade 3 Red Bank Stakes, the $100,000 Dangers Hour Stakes, and a $98,000 optional claiming race.

Two-year-old filly Abscond won the CA$250,000 G1T Natalma Stakes at Woodbine in September to qualify for the Breeders Cup at Santa Anita, where she finished 7th in the 14-horse Juvenile Fillies Turf.

On December 7, 3-year-old Shotski with Luis Saez aboard won the $250,000 Grade 2 Remsen Stakes at Aqueduct.

=== 2020 ===
Blame's stud fee was set at $35,000 for the 2020 season.

On March 14, a 3-year-old son of Blame, Nadal, ridden by Joel Rosario and trained by Bob Baffert, won the $1 million Grade 2 Rebel Stakes at Oaklawn Park, his third win in three races, to become a favorite in the Kentucky Derby, to be run in September. At that point Nadal had won $753,000 in his three starts.

On May 2, Nadal, again with Joel Rosario on board, won his fourth consecutive race, the $500,000 Grade I Arkansas Derby (Division 2) to place him atop the points standing for the 2020 Kentucky Derby, to be run in September. The $300,000 purse gave Nadal $1,053,000.00 in career winnings over four starts. The win was the 29th for a Blame progeny in 2020.

On May 28 it was announced that Nadal had suffered a condylar fracture of his left foreleg after breezing at Santa Anita Park. Surgery was successful, and he will be retired from racing and stand at stud. On October 14, 2020, it was announced that Nadal will stand at Shadai Stallion Station in Japan.

After Nadal, Dontblamerocket is Blame's highest-earning offspring in 2020 with earnings of $175,525 in 6 starts; Mrs. Sippy has won $129,000 in just 2 starts.

=== 2021 ===
Claiborne Farm announced on October 15, 2020, that Blame's stud fee for 2021 was set at $30,000.

Blame's top earner for 2021 was 5-year-old Mucho with $335,900 in earnings for 10 races, with 3 wins, 3 seconds and one third. Next was 3-year-old Officiating with 3 wins in 10 starts and $174,635 in earnings followed by 4-year-old Mandate, with 3 wins in 10 starts and 167,520 in earnings.

In 2021, Blame's top yearling sold for $525,000 while the yearling average was $131,048.

=== 2022 ===
Blame's stud fee for 2022 was set at $20,000.

On June 22, Schlofmitz became Blame's 40th stakes winner with a win in the Curtis Sampson Oaks at Canterbury Park

Top Blame progeny for the year were Come a Callin, Armando R, and Love the Nest, each of which earned over $200,000.

=== 2023 ===
Blame 3-year-old filly Wet Paint earned over $1.1 million on the year with four wins and two seconds in seven races through September. Her wins included the Grade 1 Coaching Club American Oaks at Saratoga in July; the Grade 3 Fantasy Stakes in April at Oaklawn; and the Grade 3 Honeybee Stakes in February at Oaklawn.

Claiborne Farm announced in October that Blame's stud fee would remain $25,000 for 2024.

=== 2024 ===
Early in the year, Blame 3-year-old colt Epic Ride won two races at Turfway Park, including the Leonatus Stakes. He then finished third in the Grade 2 Toyota Blue Grass Stakes at Keeneland, then 14th in the Grade 1 Kentucky Derby at Churchill Downs.

Epic Ride was Blame's top earner with $286,211 in 2024. Other Blame progeny winning more than $200,000 were Agra, Pigalle, and two-year-old Crazy Frazy.

Crazy Frazy's win in the Sapling Stakes at Monmouth Park Racetrack was Blame's 50th stakes winner.

Blame's top yearling sold for $350,000 in 2024, with his top two-year-old selling for $400,000.

Claiborne Farm announced in October that Blame's stud fee for 2025 would remain at $25,000.

=== 2025 ===
Four-year-old Epic Ride became Blame's top earner for both single-race and all-time earnings on September 6 with a win in the grade 3 $2.49 million FanDuel TV Mint Millions Invitational at Kentucky Downs. The 14-1 Epic Ride, with Edgar Morales aboard, won $1.4 million on the turf, bringing his career earnings to $1.926 million.

A weekend earlier, Blame's Sibayan added a second straight Group 2 win to his record when he won the Grand Prix de Deauville (G2) in France. Sibayan also scored wins in the Prix Maurice de Nieuil (G2) and the Derby Du Midi (Listed) and was second in the Prix d'Hedouville (G3). Later in September, Sibayan won the group 1 Preis von Europa at Cologne, Germany, earning 100,000 euros.

In 2025, Blame's top yearling sold for $475,000 and top two-year-old went for $350,000. By September 2025, Blame had sired 52 stakes winners including six grade 1 winners.

On October 4, two-year-old filly Explora, trained by Bob Baffert, won the $200,000 Grade 2 Oak Leaf Stakes at Santa Anita Park to secure a spot in the $2 million 2025 Breeders Cup Juvenile Fillies. It was her second win in three career races, with a second in the prior race, the Grade 1 Del Mar Debutante.

Three-year-old filly Admit won the $400,000 Bank of America Valley View (G2) in stakes-record time at Keeneland on October 24 with John R. Velazquez aboard. The winner's share was $226,300.

Explora returned to racing on October 31 as the favorite in the $2 million Grade 1 Breeders Cup Juvenile Fillies at Del Mar Racetrack. She battled Super Corredora down the stretch to finish three-quarters of a length back–and a full three lengths ahead of the field–earning $340,000. Explora's two-year-old season resulted in two wins and two seconds in four races, earning $568,000.

As of the end of 2025, Blame had sired 54 stakes winners and 25 at graded level. His daughters have 32 stakes winners and 50 stakes performers led by seven Grade 1 winners.

=== 2026 ===
Explora, now age 3, established herself as one of top fillies in the world. On January 10, with Juan Hernandez aboard, she won the $98,000 Santa Ynez Stakes at Santa Anita. On February 8, she finished a close second in the $100,000 Las Virgenes Stakes at Santa Anita. On March 1, now with Flavien Prat aboard, she won the grade 3 $750,000 Honeybee Stakes at Oaklawn Park to put her atop the standings for the May 1 grade 1 Kentucky Oaks at Churchill Downs.

As of the Honeybee win, Explora had run seven career races with four wins and three seconds and in 2026 alone had won $485,000 with career earnings of $1,053,000.

Explora, a co-favorite in the Grade 1 Kentucky Oaks run May 2 at Churchill Downs, finished fourth in the 13-horse field, earning $69,000 for a total of $554,000 earned in 2026.

She bounced back on June 7 with a win in the $225,000 Leslie's Lady Stakes at Churchill Downs. On August 8 she nabbed a milestone win with her first Grade 1 victory, a five-length romp with Flavien Prat aboard in the $500,000 Test Stakes at Saratoga, bringing her career earnings to over $1.5 million.

Blame Ashley age 2, has made an impressive start to her racing career, winning each of her first three starts and remaining undefeated. Her victories have come at Santa Anita Park and Del Mar Racetrack in California, with wins on both dirt and turf surfaces, demonstrating her versatility. With a 3-for-3 record and approximately $91,000 in career purse earnings, Blame Ashley adds to the accomplishments of Blame's offspring as a sire.

== Honors ==
In February 2020, Churchill Downs announced that a race named in Blame's honor would be run beginning in May 2020 — The Blame Stakes, a prep race for the $500,000 Stephen Foster Stakes (G1) June 27 at Churchill Downs.

== Career race results ==
Finish	Race	Distance	Jockey	Time	Grade	Runner up	Track
1st	Breeders' Cup Classic	1 1/4 mi	G. Gomez	2:02.28	I	Zenyatta	Churchill Downs
2nd	Jockey Club Gold Cup	1 1/4 mi	G. Gomez	2:02.48	I	Haynesfield (1st)	Belmont Park
1st	Whitney Handicap	1 1/8 mi	G. Gomez	1:48.88	I	Quality Road	Saratoga Race Track
1st	Stephen Foster Handicap	1 1/8 m	G. Gomez	1:49.37	I	Battle Plan	Churchill Downs
1st	William Donald Schaefer Handicap	1 1/16 mi	G. Gomez	1:43.40	III	No Advantage	Pimlico Race Track
1st	Clark Handicap	1 1/8 mi	J. Theriot	1:49.39	II	Misremembered	Churchill Downs
1st	Fayette Stakes	1 1/8 mi	J. Theriot	1:50.54	II	Parading	Keeneland Race Track
2nd	Super Derby	1 1/8 mi	J. Theriot	1:49.63	II	Regal Ransom (1st)	Louisiana Downs
1st	Curlin Stakes	1 1/8 mi	J. Theriot	1:49.00	None	Gone Astray	Belmont Park
1st	Allowance	1 mi	J. Theriot	1:36.41	None	Blackberry Road	Churchill Downs
3rd	Allowance	7 fur	G. Gomez	1:22.61	None	Guam Typhoon (1st)	Churchill Downs
1st	Maiden	7 fur	J. Theriot	1:26.27	None	Flying Warrior	Keeneland Race Track
3rd	Maiden	6 1/2 fur	L. Wade	1:17.16	None	Beethoven (1st)	Turfway Park

== Pedigree ==
Pedigree of Blame, bay colt, 2006
Sire Arch	Kris S.	Roberto	Hail To Reason
Sire Arch	Kris S.	Roberto	Bramalea
Sire Arch	Kris S.	Sharp Queen	Princequillo
Sire Arch	Kris S.	Sharp Queen	Bridgework
Sire Arch	Aurora	Danzig	Northern Dancer
Sire Arch	Aurora	Danzig	Pas de Nom
Sire Arch	Aurora	Althea	Alydar
Sire Arch	Aurora	Althea	Courtly Dee
Dam Liable	Seeking The Gold	Mr. Prospector	Raise a Native
Dam Liable	Seeking The Gold	Mr. Prospector	Gold Digger
Dam Liable	Seeking The Gold	Con Game	Buckpasser
Dam Liable	Seeking The Gold	Con Game	Broadway
Dam Liable	Bound	Nijinsky	Northern Dancer
Dam Liable	Bound	Nijinsky	Flaming Page
Dam Liable	Bound	Special	Forli
Dam Liable	Bound	Special	Thong (family: 5-h)
