= William Donald Schaefer Memorial Stakes =

Horse race in Baltimore, Maryland

William Donald Schaefer Memorial Handicap
- Class: Grade III
- Location: Pimlico Race Course, Baltimore, Maryland, United States
- Inaugurated: 1987
- Race type: Thoroughbred - Flat racing

Race information
- Distance: 1 1/8 miles 9 furlong
- Surface: Dirt
- Track: Left-handed
- Qualification: Three-year-olds & up, open
- Weight: Assigned
- Purse: $100,000

The William Donald Schaefer Memorial Stakes is an American Thoroughbred horse race held annually during the third week of May at Pimlico Race Course in Baltimore, Maryland. A Grade III event open to three-year-old horses and up, it is contested on dirt over a distance of 1 1/8 miles (nine furlongs). This race had been run as the Never Bend Handicap from its inception in 1987 through 1993.

== Namesake ==
The race was named in honor of former Maryland Governor and industry advocate William Donald Schaefer (1921-2011). Schaefer was an American politician who served in public office for 50 years at both the state and local level in Maryland. A Democrat, he served as mayor of Baltimore from 1971 to 1987, the 58th Governor of Maryland from 1987 to 1995, and the Comptroller of Maryland from 1999 to 2007.

== Race info ==
The William Donald Schaefer Handicap became an American graded stakes race in 2001. In 2007, the race was won by West Point Thoroughbred's Flashy Bull a multiple grade one winner including a win in the Stephen Foster Handicap. The stakes record was held by Tidal Surge who won the race in 1995 in a time of 1:48.19.

== Records ==
Speed record:

- 1 1/8 miles - 1:47.10 - Private Terms (1989)
- 1 1/16 miles - 1:42.20 - Senator to Be (1991)

Most wins by an owner:

- 2 - West Point Thoroughbreds (2004, 2007)

Most wins by a jockey:

- 3 - Jerry Bailey (1998, 2001, 2005)
- 3 - Pat Day (1991, 1992, 2000)

Most wins by a trainer:

- 3 - Nick Zito (1991, 1992, 1998)

== Winners ==
Year	Winner	Age	Jockey	Trainer	Owner	Distance	Time	Purse	Grade
2011	Apart	5	Garrett Gomez	Albert Stall Jr.	Adele B. Dilschneider	1-1/16	1:43.70	$100,000	III
2010	Blame	4	Garrett Gomez	Albert Stall Jr.	Dlschneider/Claiborne Farm	1-1/16	1:43.40	$100,000	III
2009	No Advantage	4	J. D. Acosta	Stephanie Beattie	Joe Besecker & Kirk Wycoff	1-1/16	1:42.79	$100,000	III
2008	No Race	-	No Race	No Race	No Race	no race	0:00.00	no race	III
2007	Flashy Bull	4	Alan Garcia	Kiaran McLaughlin	West Point Thoroughbreds	1-1/8	1:47.20	$100,000	III
2006	Master Command	4	Garrett Gomez	Todd A. Pletcher	Aaron & Marie Jones	1-1/8	1:49.42	$100,000	III
2005	Zakocity	4	Jerry Bailey	Patrick L. Reynolds	Paul Pompa, Jr.	1-1/8	1:49.19	$100,000	III
2004	Seattle Fitz	5	Richard Migliore	Kiaran McLaughlin	West Point Thoroughbreds	1-1/8	1:49.43	$100,000	III
2003	Windsor Castle	5	José A. Santos	Frank A. Alexander	Dogwood Stable	1-1/8	1:50.08	$100,000	III
2002	Tenpins	4	Robby Albarado	Donald R. Winfree	Joseph Vitello	1-1/8	1:50.20	$100,000	III
2001	Perfect Cat	4	Jerry Bailey	Mark A. Hennig	Edward P. Evans	1-1/8	1:49.55	$100,000	III
2000	Ecton Park	4	Pat Day	W. Elliott Walden	Mark H. Stanley	1-1/8	1:49.21	$100,000	III
1999	Perfect to a Tee	7	A. C. Cortez	Linda L. Albert	Nonsequitur Stable	1-1/8	1:49.20	$100,000	III
1998	Acceptable	4	Jerry Bailey	Nick Zito	Kinsman Stable	1-1/8	1:48.76	$100,000	III
1997	Western Echo	5	Edgar Prado	Bud Delp	Harry C. & Tom O. Meyerhoff	1-1/8	1:49.41	$100,000	III
1996	Canaveral	5	Shane Sellers	H. Graham Motion	Morven Stud	1-1/8	1:49.03	$100,000	III
1995	Tidal Surge	5	Jeff D. Carle	Timothy F. Ritchey	not found	1-1/8	1:48.19	$100,000	III
1994	Taking Risks	4	Mark T. Johnston	King T. Leatherbury	Lakeville Stables	1-1/8	1:49.53	$75,000	III
1993	Root Boy	5	Herb McCauley	Louis D. Bernier, Jr.	Richard F. Blue, Jr.	1-1/16	1:42.60	$75,000	III
1992	Senator to Be	6	Pat Day	Nick Zito	BCC Stable	1-1/16	1:42.60	$51,000	III
1991	Senator to Be	5	Pat Day	Nick Zito	BCC Stable	1-1/16	1:42.20	$50,000	III
1990	Flaming Emperor	4	"Jo Jo" Ladner	Kenny Cox	Hideaway Farms	1-1/8	1:49.60	$50,000	III
1989	Private Terms	4	Kent Desormeaux	Charles Hadry	Stuart Janney, Jr.	1-1/8	1:47.10	$50,000	III
1988	Little Bold John	6	Donnie Miller Jr.	Jerry Robb	John E. Owens	1-1/8	1:50.20	$55,000	
1987	Brilliant Stepper	5	Allen Stacy	King T. Leatherbury	Cot Campbell	1-3/16	1:58.20	$55,000	

== See also ==
- William Donald Schaefer Handicap top three finishers
