= Floral Park Handicap =

The Floral Park Handicap is an American Thoroughbred horse race run at Belmont Park on Long Island, New York in its fall meet. Established for fillies and mares, age three and up, it started out as a sprint at 6 furlongs on the dirt and offers a purse of $100,000 added.

The year 2007 saw the 13th running of the Floral Park which is named for Floral Park, New York, the site of a very early racetrack, one of America's first horse running courses. In those days races were not run on ovals; they were run in heats over hill and dale, usually four in number, and were exhausting affairs.

In December 2006, the New York Racing Association (NYRA) announced the elimination of this race beginning in 2007 due to its poor placement on the Breeder's Cup Sprint run-up schedule.

On September 27, 2007, NYRA scheduled the Floral Park Handicap as the Floral Park Stakes, with minor modifications. The race conditions were changed; it was run at seven furlongs, changed from six furlongs in previous editions, and was restricted to New York-bred fillies and mares. The winner of this particular race in 2007 was Ice Cool Kitty.

In 2008, the Floral Park Stakes (or Floral Park Handicap) was run at 1 mile or 8 furlongs.

Starting in 2018, the Floral Park Stakes was revived as a stakes event, this time being run on the inner turf course at a distance of six furlongs.

== Past winners ==
- 2020 - Lead Guitar
- 2019 - Fire Key
- 2018 - Fire Key

- 2008 - Wishful Tomcat (Big Truck placed.)
- 2007 - Ice Cool Kitty (2007 edition named Floral Park Stakes, run at seven furlongs and restricted to New York-bred fillies and mares)

- 2006 - Win McCool
- 2005 - Smokey Glacken
- 2004 - Feline Story
- 2003 - Bauhauser (ARG)
- 2002 - Carson Hollow
- 2001 - Gold Mover
- 2000 - Big Bambu
- 1999 - Positive Gal
- 1998 - Blue Begonia
- 1997 - Creamy Dreamy
- 1996 - Lottsa Talc
- 1995 - Twist Afleet
