= Devil May Care (horse) =

American-bred Thoroughbred racehorse

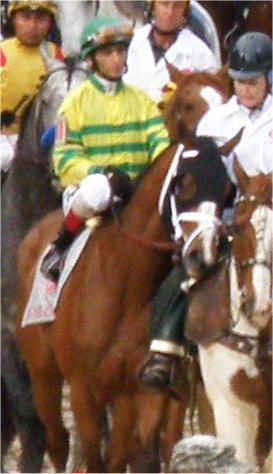
- Devil May Care at 2010 Kentucky Derby
- Sire: Malibu Moon
- Grandsire: A.P. Indy
- Dam: Kelli's Ransom
- Sex: Filly
- Foaled: 2007
- Country: United States
- Colour: Bay
- Breeder: Diamond A Racing Corp.
- Owner: Glencrest Farm
- Trainer: Todd Pletcher
- Record: 9: 5-0-0
- Earnings: US$ 725,000

Major wins
- Frizette Stakes (2009); Bonnie Miss Stakes (2010); Mother Goose Stakes (2010); CCA Oaks (2010)

Devil May Care (May 7, 2007 – May 4, 2011) was an American Thoroughbred racehorse.

Out of the mare Kelli's Ransom, Devil May Care was sired by Malibu Moon, a son of the multiple Grade I winner, A.P. Indy. She was owned by Glencrest Farms and trained by Todd Pletcher

Devil May Care won the Grade I Frizette Stakes at two. At three, she found her form again when she upset the favorite in the 2010 Bonnie Miss Stakes. Devil May Care was the only filly entered in the 2010 Kentucky Derby, going off at odds of 10:1. She finished 10th behind the winner Super Saver.

The daughter of Malibu Moon returned on June 26, 2010, to win the Mother Goose Stakes in fine style, covering the 1 1/16 distance in a record time of 1:42.06. Devil May Care was euthanized on May 4, 2011, after a confirmed diagnosis of lymphosarcoma, a form of cancer.

== Career statistics ==
Finish	Jockey	Race	1st	2nd	3rd	Time
4th	John Velazquez	Alabama-G1	Blind Luck	Havre de Grace	Acting Happy	2:03.89
1st	John Velazquez	Coaching Club America	Devil May Care	Biofuel	Acting Happy	1:49.42
1st	John Velazquez	Mother Goose-G1	Devil May Care	Connie And Michael	Biofuel	1:42.06
10th	John Velazquez	Kentucky Derby-G1	Super Saver	Ice Box	Paddy O'Prado	2:04.45
1st	John Velazquez	Bonnie Miss-G2	Devil May Care	Amen Hallelujah	Joanie's Catch	1:49.06
5th	Javier Castellano	Silverbulletday-G3	Jody Slew	Quite Temper	Age Of Humor	1:45.80
11th	John Velazquez	BC Juvenile Fillies-G1	She Be Wild	Beautician	Blind Luck	1:43.80
1st	John Velazquez	Frizette-G1	Devil May Care	Awesome Maria	Nonna Mia	1:35.07
1st	John Velazquez	Msw-G1	Devil May Care	Katy Now	Vaporize	1:11.65
