= Private Terms =

American-bred Thoroughbred racehorse

- Sire: Private Account
- Grandsire: Damascus
- Dam: Laughter
- Damsire: Bold Ruler
- Sex: Stallion
- Foaled: 1985
- Country: United States
- Colour: Dark Brown
- Breeder: Stuart Janney, Jr.
- Owner: Stuart Janney, Jr.
- Trainer: Charles H. Hadry
- Record: 17: 13-0-0
- Earnings: US$1,243,947

Major wins
- Wood Memorial Stakes(1988); Gotham Stakes (1988); Massachusetts Handicap (1989); Federico Tesio Stakes (1988); General George Handicap (1989); Damascus Handicap (1989); Maryland Governors' Cup Handicap (1989); Prelude Stakes (1987); Never Bend Handicap (1989)

Private Terms (April 6, 1985 – January 22, 2010) was a millionaire American Thoroughbred racehorse and successful stallion. He was the son of Private Account, who in turn was the son of the great Damascus. Bred in Kentucky by Stuart Janney, Jr., he finished racing with a record of 13-0-0 in 17 starts with career earnings of $1,243,947. Private Terms was best known for his wins in the grade one Wood Memorial Stakes and the grade two General George Handicap.

== Three-year-old season ==
At age three, Private Terms began to show great promise as he won one race after another. In his fifth start, he won the grade two Gotham Stakes at 1 1/16 miles at Aqueduct Racetrack, beating Seeking the Gold and Perfect Spy under jockey Chris Antley. Then he won the $500,000 grade one Wood Memorial Stakes, where he defeated Seeking the Gold again and began a heated rivalry with his foe that lasted two years.

He went into the gate in the 1988 Kentucky Derby unbeaten in seven starts and the second favorite in the race behind Winning Colors. Private Terms finished ninth behind Winning Colors, Forty Niner and Risen Star, beaten just under six lengths.

He returned in the $500,000 grade one Preakness Stakes as a 3-1 third choice in a field of ten graded stakes winners. In the "Run for the Black-Eyed Susan," he stalked the pace and moved from seventh to fourth at the top of the stretch. Lacking a strong close, Private Terms finished fourth, four lengths behind Risen Star, Brian's Time and Winning Colors.

He did not contest the Belmont, which Risen Star won, but won the listed Governor's Handicap at Pimlico Race Course. He then ran fourth behind Forty Niner and Seeking the Gold in the grade one Haskell Invitational Handicap. Later that year, it looked like Private Term might be a threat in the grade one Super Derby when after he won the preparatory Prelude Stakes, but he ran fourth behind Seeking the Gold, Happyasalark Tomas and Lively One. That event marked the end of his sophomore year as finished with a record of 9-0-0 in 13 starts.

== Four-year-old season ==
Private Terms ran successfully at age four, winning three of four starts. One of those wins was the grade two Massachusetts Handicap at Suffolk Downs. His other two wins came in listed stakes: the Damascus Handicap at Laurel Park Racecourse named after his grandsire and set a new track record the Never Bend Handicap for nine furlongs at Pimlico, 1:47.10.

The almost black colt retired with 13 wins in 17 starts and earnings of $1,243,947. He was only off the board two times in his career (Kentucky Derby and 4 year-old debut).

== Retirement ==
Private Terms produced 16 crops containing a total of 623 foals for an average of 39 foals per year. Of those crops, he had 75% starters, 54% winners and 14% stakes winners. He has also sired 3% graded stakes placed horses. Soul of the Matter and Afternoon Deelites were his two best runners. Soul of the Matter avenged his sire's loss in the Super Derby of 1994 and won or placed in eight other graded races, including a second in the Dubai World Cup. He was exported to Japan where he did not do well at stud, and then went California. Afternoon Deelites is now at stud in Louisiana. He previously stood at Airdrie Stud in the Bluegrass State. He has sired 4% stakes winners and has consistently led the sire list in his new home state. La Reine's Terms has done most of his racing in Maryland-bred events, where he has won 16 of 40 starts and $804,591. Private Lap, out of the Dynaformer mare Just Like Jill, has won almost $700,000 and is a listed stakes winner.
