= Flashy Bull =

American-bred Thoroughbred racehorse

- Flashy Bull in paddock before 2006 Ohio Derby
- Sire: Holy Bull
- Grandsire: Great Above
- Dam: Iridescence
- Damsire: Mt Livermore
- Sex: Stallion
- Foaled: 2003
- Country: United States
- Colour: Gray
- Breeder: Jerry and Liz Squyres
- Owner: West Point Thoroughbreds
- Trainer: Kiaran McLaughlin
- Record: 19:5-5-3
- Earnings: $844,313

Major wins
- Stephen Foster Handicap (2007); William Donald Schaefer Handicap (2007)
- Last updated on August 10, 2007

Flashy Bull (foaled March 13, 2003) by Jerry and Liz Squyres at Crowning Point Farm in Paris, Kentucky is an American thoroughbred racehorse. He was sired by the 1994 U.S. Horse of the Year Holy Bull out of the mare, Iridescence.

He was a contender for the Triple Crown in 2006.

As of July, 2007, he had started 19 times, winning 5, placing in 5, and showing in three and had lifetime earnings of $844,313.

In August, 2007, he was retired to stud due to a cracked sesamoid bone in his left ankle, believed to have happened in the Whitney Handicap at Saratoga Race Course on July 28 where he was unplaced.

== Connections ==
Flashy Bull was owned by West Point Thoroughbreds and was trained by Kiaran McLaughlin. His rider in the Kentucky Derby was Mike E. Smith. He was ridden to a third-place finish in the Ohio Derby by Luis Antonio Gonzalez.

== Races ==
Finish	Race	Distance	Track	Condition
1st	Stephen Foster Handicap	1-1/8 miles	Churchill Downs	Fast
1st	William Donald Schaefer Handicap	1-1/8 miles	Pimlico	
7th	Haskell Invitational Handicap	1 and 1/8 miles	Monmouth	Fast
3rd	Ohio Derby	One and One-Eighth Miles	Thistledown	Fast
14th	Kentucky Derby	One and One-Quarter Miles	Churchill Downs	
7th	Florida Derby	One and One-Eighth Miles	Gulfstream Park	Fast
2nd (by disqualification)	Fountain of Youth Stakes	One and One-Eighth Miles	Gulfstream Park	Fast
4th	Holy Bull Stakes	One and One-Eighth Miles	Gulfstream Park	Sloppy
2nd	Remsen Stakes	One and One-Eighth Miles	Aqueduct Racetrack	Fast
1st	Maiden	One and One-Sixteenths Miles	Belmont Park	Good
2nd	Maiden	Seven Furlongs	Belmont Park	Fast
3rd	Maiden	Seven Furlongs	Saratoga Race Course	Muddy
2nd	Maiden	Six Furlongs	Saratoga Race Course	Fast
4th	Maiden	Five and One-Half Furlongs	Belmont Park	Fast
