= Palos Verdes Stakes =

- Class: Listed
- Location: Santa Anita Park; Arcadia, California, United States
- Inaugurated: 1936 as Palos Verdes Handicap; Reestablished: 1951
- Race type: Thoroughbred - Flat racing
- Website: Santa Anita Park

Race information
- Distance: 6 furlongs
- Surface: Dirt
- Track: left-handed
- Qualification: Four-years-old and older
- Weight: 124 lbs. with allowances
- Purse: $100,000 (since 2024)

The Palos Verdes Stakes is a Listed American thoroughbred horse race for four-year-olds and older over a distance of six furlongs on the dirt track held annually in late January or early February at Santa Anita Park in Arcadia, California, USA. The event currently carries a purse of $100,000.

== History ==
The event is named after one of the first California land grants known as Rancho San Pedro consisting today of the Pacific coast cities of Los Angeles harbor, San Pedro, the Palos Verdes Peninsula and other cities in Los Angeles County including Rancho Palos Verdes which is approximately 50 miles from Santa Anita Park.

=== Pre World War II (1936) ===
The first running of the event known as the Palos Verdes Handicap was on 25 February 1936. The event was for three-year-olds and older for a purse of $1,200 with seven starters. The event was won by Mars heiress Mrs. Ethel V. Mars's Milky Way Farm Stable – The Fighter, trained by Robert V. McGarvey and ridden by US Hall of Fame jockey Alfred M. Robertson by a margin 1 1/4 lengths in a relatively fast time of 1:11 flat on a drying track. The Fighter was the only three-year-old in the field and was preparing for the U.S. Triple Crown events. Later in May, The Fighter ran in the 1936 Kentucky Derby where he was prominent early in the event but faded to finish eleventh.

=== Post World War II ===
The event would not be held for fifteen years and was reinstated by Santa Anita Track Administration as part of the stakes program for the opening week of the 1951–52 Winter Meeting. The event would grown in prominence in the 1950s and would become an Opening Day feature for the track's Winter Meetings. The first time the event was held on an Opening Day was on 26 December 1953 and 62,000 were on hand to see 18/1 longshot Heliowise winning by the shortest of margins and setting a new stakes record of 1:09 4/5. The following year Imbros carried a remarkable 128 pounds giving eighteen pounds to the fine sprinter Berseem (second place) and Hour Regards (third place) and would equal the track record for the six furlongs distance of 1:09 flat. Ten years later Imbros's son, one of California's all-time favorite horses, Native Diver would win the first of his two victories in the event.

Other notable winners from this era were the 1956 winner Porterhouse who was the 1953 US Champion Two-Year-Old Male. Revel, the 1961 winner carried 127 pounds defeating the 1960 winner Ole Fols by 2 3/4 lengths as the 3/2 favorite. In 1963 Cyrano easily defeated Sledge by three lengths with the favorite Olden Times a further 3 1/2 lengths away setting a new track record of 1:08 2/5 for the distance.

US Hall of Famer Native Diver won the 1964 rendition of the event in front of 70,024 on Opening Day. The following year Native Diver carried a mammoth 129 pounds and led throughout to win by a neck as the 1/2on favorite.

The event was scheduled to be held on Opening Day in 1969 but due to a strike by racetrack employees the race was not run. The event was rescheduled for later in January 1970 but the strike continued until early February and the race was canceled.

For the 1970–71 Winter Meeting the event was scheduled on Saturday, 2 January 1971 for horses four-years-old or older. Hence, the event was also not held in 1970. The great Ack Ack was assigned 129 pounds and started as the 4/5 odds-on favorite but was soundly beaten by Jungle Savage by three lengths. The following Winter Meeting (1971–72) the event was scheduled in December and conditions were for three-year-olds and older. King of Cricket won by a stakes record margin of six lengths.

=== Classification and Breeders' Cup era ===
In 1973 when the American Graded Stakes Committee began the classification of US thoroughbred races the event was installed with Grade III status. The event held that status for one year in 1974 before the event was downgraded to Listed. The winner of the 1974 rendition, Ancient Title carried 126 pounds to victory as an 11/10 favorite atoning for his third place in the previous year. Ancient Title would again run third in 1976 to the three-year-old Maheras. From 1985 until 2011 both Hollywood Park and Santa Anita Park Administration carded an event in honor of Ancient Title known as the Ancient Title Handicap. Today the event is known as the Grade II Santa Anita Sprint Championship, run over the same distance as the Palos Verdes Stakes but is held in the fall.

In 1982 with a massive crowd of 69,293 the event was won by Chinook Pass who easily won by three lengths and equaled the track record of 1:07 2/5. Chinook Pass would continue his fine form into 1983 and would be voted US Champion Sprint Horse. Phone Trick continued his undefeated streak of six in 1985 when he easily won by 4 1/2 lengths as the 4/5 odds-on favorite. Phone Trick's career would end with an injury the following year after a 10 start, 9 wins and one second career.

In 1988 the event was upgraded back to Grade III. In 1990 the event was held for the last time in December. For the 1991–92 Winter Meeting the Santa Anita Administration scheduled the event in February 1992 as a four-year-olds and older. The event has held its place in the racing calendar schedule as either being run in late January or early February.

The first participant than ran in the Palos Verdes Handicap to make an impact at the Breeders' Cup was Cardmania. In 1993 Cardmania finished third to 14/1 longshot Music Merci, beaten by about 1 1/4 lengths after leading into the straight. A consistent sprinter Cardmania had eight starts without any victories before hitting form in mid-October and winning the Ancient Title Breeders' Cup Handicap. The following start Cardmania won the Breeders' Cup Sprint and later was voted US Champion Sprint Champion for 1983. Music Merci finished sixth in the same event.

The first horse to win the Palos Verdes Handicap and Breeders' Cup Sprint in the same year (1996) was the gray horse Lit de Justice. Lit de Justice finished third in the 1995 Breeders' Cup Sprint at Belmont Park. After returning to California, Lit de Justice finished second in an allowance at Hollywood Park Racetrack and in his first run of 1996 would win the now discontinued El Conejo Handicap over the shorter 5 1/2 furlong distance easily by 5 1/2 lengths. Next start Lit de Justice prevailed in the Palos Verdes Handicap as the 11/10 favorite. In his last start of the year and his career Lit de Justice won the 1996 Breeders' Cup Sprint at Woodbine Racetrack in Canada and was crowned the US Champion Sprint Champion.

In 1998 the event was upgraded to Grade II and would hold this status until 2020.

In 2000 as a six-year-old Kona Gold also captured the Palos Verdes Handicap and then later in year the Breeders' Cup Sprint and was crowned the US Champion Sprint Champion. Kona Gold also finished second in the 1999 running of Palos Verdes Handicap and as a nine-year-old finished last of six entrants as the 7/5 favorite beaten by the Argentine-bred Avanzado by 5 3/4 lengths.

In 2007 Santa Anita Park administration installed a new All-weather track and for the 2008 the winner was In Summation who set a new stakes and track record for the distance with a time of 1:06.67. Since 2011 the event has been held on the dirt track. In 2011 the conditions of the event were changed to as stakes with allowance and the name of the event was modified to the Palos Verdes Stakes.

The winner of the 2018 running of the event only four horses were entered and was won by the 2017 Breeders' Cup Sprint winner and US Champion Sprint Champion Roy H who was the overwhelming 1/5 odds-on favorite who toyed with his opponents winning by 3 1/2 lengths. Later in the year Roy H repeated winning the Breeders' Cup Sprint and once again voted as US Champion Sprint Champion for 2018. In 2019 Roy H returned to face five opponents in the Palos Verdes Stakes and again easily won the race by 4 lengths as the 3/10 odds-on favorite becoming the second two-time winner of the event.

In 2026 the event was downgraded by the Thoroughbred Owners and Breeders Association to Listed status.

== Records ==
Speed record:

- 1:06.67 - In Summation (2008)

Margins:

- 6 1/2 lengths – Impressive Luck (1977)
- 6 lengths – King of Cricket (1971)

Most wins:

- 2 – Native Diver (1964, 1965)
- 2 – Roy H (2018, 2019)

Most wins by an owner:

- 3 – Llangollen Farm (1956, 1957, 1966)
- 3 – David A. Bernsen (2017, 2018, 2019)

Most wins by a jockey:

- 7 – Laffit Pincay, Jr. (1968, 1974, 1976, 1982, 1985, 1992, 2001)

Most wins by a trainer:

- 4 – Buster Millerick (1955, 1964, 1965, 1967)
- 4 – Charles E. Whittingham (1956, 1957, 1959, 1966)
- 4 – Peter Miller (2017, 2018, 2019, 2020)
- 4 – Bob Baffert (1997, 2011, 2022, 2023)

== Winners ==
Year	Winner	Age	Jockey	Trainer	Owner	Distance	Time	Purse	Grade	Ref
Palos Verdes Stakes
2026	Man O Rose	6	Emisael Jaramillo	Jeff Mullins	B & B Zietz Stables	6 furlongs	1:09.87	$100,000	Listed	
2025	Roll On Big Joe	5	Umberto Rispoli	Robert Hess Jr.	Rancho Temescal, White Fence & Richard Hale Jr.	6 furlongs	1:08.60	$100,000	III	
2024	Big City Lights	5	Flavien Prat	Richard E. Mandella	William R. Peeples	6 furlongs	1:09.91	$100,000	III	
2023	Hopkins	4	Juan Hernandez	Bob Baffert	SF Racing, Starlight Racing, Madekat Stables, Stonestreet Stables, Golconda Stables, Siena Farm and Robert E. Masterson	6 furlongs	1:08.80	$200,000	III	
2022	Essential Wager	4	Abel Cedillo	Bob Baffert	Karl Watson, Michael E. Pegram & Paul Weitman	6 furlongs	1:09.95	$200,000	III	
2021	Wildman Jack	5	Abel Cedillo	Doug F. O'Neill	Glenn Sorgenstein WC Racing	6 furlongs	1:08.98	$201,500	III	
2020	Captain Scotty	6	Abel Cedillo	Peter L. Miller	Wachtel Stable & Gary Barber	6 furlongs	1:09.46	$196,000	II	
2019	Roy H	7	Paco Lopez	Peter L. Miller	Rockingham Ranch & David A. Bernsen	6 furlongs	1:08.89	$200,351	II	
2018	Roy H	6	Kent J. Desormeaux	Peter L. Miller	Rockingham Ranch & David A. Bernsen	6 furlongs	1:09.68	$196,000	II	
2017	St. Joe Bay	5	Kent J. Desormeaux	Peter L. Miller	Al Tamira Racing Stable & David A. Bernsen	6 furlongs	1:08.75	$196,000	II	
2016	Kobe's Back	5	Gary L. Stevens	Peter Eurton	C R K Stable	6 furlongs	1:08.70	$200,000	II	
2015	Conquest Two Step	4	Joseph Talamo	Mark E. Casse	Conquest Stables	6 furlongs	1:08.10	$200,250	II	
2014	Wild Dude	4	Rafael Bejarano	Jerry Hollendorfer	Jerry Hollendorfer & Green Smith	6 furlongs	1:08.09	$200,000	II	
2013	Sahara Sky	5	Joseph Talamo	Jerry Hollendorfer	Jerry Hollendorfer & Sweetwater Stable	6 furlongs	1:07.73	$150,500	II	
2012	Frumious	6	Antonio L. Castanon	Jeffrey L. Bonde	George & Mary Clare Schmitt	6 furlongs	1:07.28	$150,000	II	
2011	Euroears	7	Mike E. Smith	Bob Baffert	James E. & Marilyn Helzer	6 furlongs	1:07.23	$150,000	II	
Palos Verdes Handicap
2010	Kinsale King	5	Martin Garcia	Carl O'Callaghan	SuperHorse	6 furlongs	1:08.81	$150,000	II	
2009	Johnny Eves	5	Garrett K. Gomez	Jay M. Robbins	Mooncoin	6 furlongs	1:08.56	$150,000	II	
2008	In Summation	5	Rafael Bejarano	Christophe Clement	Waterford Stable	6 furlongs	1:06.67	$150,000	II	
2007	Friendly Island	6	Garrett K. Gomez	Michael W. McCarthy	Anstu Stable	6 furlongs	1:08.95	$147,000	II	
2006	Major Success	5	Tyler Baze	Robert J. Frankel	Edmund A. Gann	6 furlongs	1:09.23	$150,000	II	
2005	Saint Afleet	4	Pat Valenzuela	Jeff Mullins	Ronald C. Waranch	6 furlongs	1:09.15	$150,000	II	
2004	Bluesthestandard	7	Mike E. Smith	Ted H. West	Jeffrey Sengara	6 furlongs	1:08.13	$150,000	II	
2003	Avanzado (ARG)	6	Tyler Baze	Doug F. O'Neill	Cees Stable	6 furlongs	1:07.85	$150,000	II	
2002	Snow Ridge	4	Mike E. Smith	D. Wayne Lukas	Overbrook Farm	6 furlongs	1:07.70	$150,000	II	
2001	Men's Exclusive	8	Laffit Pincay Jr.	Wesley A. Ward	Hartsel E. Reed	6 furlongs	1:08.33	$200,000	II	
2000	Kona Gold	6	Alex O. Solis	Bruce Headley	Bruce Headley, Irwin & Andrew Molasky et al.	6 furlongs	1:08.85	$200,000	II	
1999	Big Jag	6	Jose Valdivia Jr.	Tim Pinfield	Julius H. Zolezzi	6 furlongs	1:08.05	$200,000	II	
1998	Funontherun	4	Goncalino Almeida	Melvin F. Stute	David & Herb Alpert	6 furlongs	1:08.93	$200,000	II	
1997	High Stakes Player	5	Corey Nakatani	Bob Baffert	Michael E. Pegram	6 furlongs	1:08.44	$211,600	III	
1996	Lit de Justice	6	Eddie Delahoussaye	Jenine Sahadi	Evergreen Farm	6 furlongs	1:08.88	$215,100	III	
1995	D'Hallevant	5	Corey Nakatani	Ron McAnally	Haras Santa Maria de Araras	6 furlongs	1:08.44	$161,900	III	
1994	Concept Win	4	Gary L. Stevens	Willard L. Proctor	Glen Hill Farm	6 furlongs	1:07.71	$107,100	III	
1993	Music Merci	7	David R. Flores	Armando Lage	Royal T Stable & Lawrence C. Pendleton	6 furlongs	1:08.82	$108,700	III	
1992	Individualist	5	Laffit Pincay Jr.	David E. Hofmans	Golden Eagle Farm	6 furlongs	1:08.66	$110,600	III	
1991	Race not held									
1990	Frost Free	5	Chris McCarron	John W. Sadler	Triple Dot Dash Stable & Jim Vandervoort	6 furlongs	1:08.60	$106,400	III	
1989	Sunny Blossom	4	Gary L. Stevens	Edwin J. Gregson	Marty Bauer, Robert Estrin & Santa Barbara Stud	6 furlongs	1:07.20	$107,400	III	
1988	On The Line	4	Gary L. Stevens	D. Wayne Lukas	Eugene V. Klein	6 furlongs	1:07.60	$107,700	III	
1987	High Brite	3	Gary L. Stevens	D. Wayne Lukas	H. Joseph Allen	6 furlongs	1:09.00	$107,500	Listed	
1986	Bedside Promise	4	Gary L. Stevens	Robert L. Martin	Jawl Brothers	6 furlongs	1:08.40	$105,250	Listed	
1985	Phone Trick	3	Laffit Pincay Jr.	Richard E. Mandella	Larry DeAngelis, Howell Wynne & Richard E. Mandella	6 furlongs	1:08.00	$86,100	Listed	
1984	Debonaire Junior	3	Chris McCarron	Noble Threewitt	Jack D. Rogers	6 furlongs	1:10.20	$87,700	Listed	
1983	Fighting Fit	4	Eddie Delahoussaye	Robert J. Frankel	Jerome S. Moss	6 furlongs	1:09.00	$65,150	Listed	
1982	Chinook Pass	3	Laffit Pincay Jr.	Bud Klokstad	Hi-Yu Stable	6 furlongs	1:07.60	$67,050	Listed	
1981	I'm Smokin	5	Pat Valenzuela	Thomas F. Proctor	Albert Levinson	6 furlongs	1:08.00	$66,200	Listed	
1980	To B. Or Not	4	Marco Castaneda	Ronald W. Ellis	Bohm Stables	6 furlongs	1:08.20	$56,500	Listed	
1979	Beau's Eagle	3	Sandy Hawley	Larry Rose	Relatively Stable	6 furlongs	1:10.00	$55,250	Listed	
1978	Little Reb	3	Frank Olivares	Jerry M. Fanning	Jerry M. Fanning & John Harrison	6 furlongs	1:08.60	$59,600	Listed	
1977	Impressive Luck	4	Sandy Hawley	Robert J. Frankel	Albert Katz	6 furlongs	1:10.40	$44,000	Listed	
1976	Maheras	3	Laffit Pincay Jr.	Lin Wheeler	Peter Cristofi & Nick Bissias	6 furlongs	1:08.60	$47,400	Listed	
1975	Messenger of Song	3	Jerry Lambert	Gordon C. Campbell	Bernard J. Ridder	6 furlongs	1:08.60	$33,300	Listed	
1974	Ancient Title	4	Laffit Pincay, Jr.	Keith L. Stucki Sr.	Ethel Kirkland	6 furlongs	1:08.80	$34,400	III	
1973	Woodland Pines	4	Donald Pierce	Cecil Jolly	Verne Winchell	6 furlongs	1:09.00	$34,300	III	
1972	Crusading	4	Fernando Toro	Tom Pratt	Dr. James Temple	6 furlongs	1:08.60	$35,400		
1971	King of Cricket	4	Howard Grant	Noble Threewitt	Angelo Corradini & John Nuccio	6 furlongs	1:11.00	$33,400		December
1971	Jungle Savage	5	Jerry Lambert	Johnny Longden	Frank M. McMahon	6 furlongs	1:08.60	$32,850		January
1969–1970		Race not held								
1968	Rising Market	4	Laffit Pincay, Jr.	Theodore B. Saladin	Mr. & Mrs. Bert W. Martin	6 furlongs	1:10.40	$28,900		
1967	Kissin' George	4	William Mahorney	Buster Millerick	DeCourcy Graham	6 furlongs	1:09.20	$28,200		
1966	Pretense	3	Bill Shoemaker	Charles E. Whittingham	Llangollen Farm	6 furlongs	1:09.20	$29,200		
1965	Native Diver	6	Jerry Lambert	Buster Millerick	Mr. & Mrs. Louis K. Shapiro	6 furlongs	1:09.00	$22,800		
1964	Native Diver	5	Jerry Lambert	Buster Millerick	Mr. & Mrs. Louis K. Shapiro	6 furlongs	1:10.20	$23,350		
1963	Cyrano	4	Manuel Ycaza	William J. Hirsch	Greentree Stable	6 furlongs	1:08.40	$22,450		
1962	Crozier	4	Ismael Valenzuela	Julius E. Tinsley Jr.	Fred W. Hooper	6 furlongs	1:09.20	$23,150		
1961	Revel	5	Alex Maese	C. E. "Buck" Logan	Helen L. Kenaston	6 furlongs	1:09.80	$23,250		
1960	§ Ole Fols (IRE)	4	Bill Shoemaker	William B. Finnegan	Neil S. McCarthy	6 furlongs	1:09.40	$23,950		
1959	Clandestine	4	Bill Shoemaker	Charles E. Whittingham	C. Z. Guest & Charles Wacker	6 furlongs	1:09.20	$22,000		
1958	Golden Notes	4	Eddie Arcaro	William J. Hirsch	King Ranch	6 furlongs	1:09.60	$22,600		
1957	Nashville	3	Bill Shoemaker	Charles E. Whittingham	Llangollen Farm	6 furlongs	1:09.60	$23,350		
1956	Porterhouse	5	Eddie Arcaro	Charles E. Whittingham	Llangollen Farm	6 furlongs	1:10.20	$22,550		
1955	History Book	5	Ralph Neves	Buster Millerick	Mr. & Mrs. Barry J. Richards	6 furlongs	1:10.80	$23,300		
1954	Imbros	4	Johnny Longden	William Molter	Andrew J. Crevolin	6 furlongs	1:09.00	$23,900		
1953	Heliowise	5	Peter Moreno	Edward A. Neloy	Dormar Stable	6 furlongs	1:09.40	$24,200		
1952	First Glance	5	Eric Guerin	William C. Winfrey	Alfred G. Vanderbilt II	6 furlongs	1:10.20	$22,300		
1951	Northern Star	3	Ted Atkinson	George T. Poole	Greentree Stable	6 furlongs	1:10.40	$23,150		
1937–1950		Race not held								
1936	The Fighter	3	Alfred M. Robertson	Robert V. McGarvey	Milky Way Farm Stable	6 furlongs	1:11.00	$1,200		

Legend:
All Weather Track Dirt

Notes:
§ Ran as an entry

== See also ==
List of American and Canadian Graded races
