= Kona Gold Stakes =

- Class: Listed
- Location: Santa Anita Park; Arcadia, California, United States
- Inaugurated: 1983 (as Potrero Grande Handicap)
- Race type: Thoroughbred – Flat racing
- Website: www.santaanita.com

Race information
- Distance: 6 1/2 furlongs
- Surface: Dirt
- Track: left-handed
- Qualification: Three-years-old and older
- Weight: Base weights with allowances: 4-year-olds and up: 126 lbs. 3-year-olds: 118 lbs.
- Purse: US$100,000 (since 2021)

The Kona Gold Stakes is a Listed American Thoroughbred horse race for horses that are three years old or older with allowance conditions, over a distance of six and one half furlongs on the dirt. It is held annually in April at Santa Anita Park, Arcadia, California. The event currently carries a purse of $100,000.

== History ==
The event was inaugurated on Wednesday, 2 March 1983 as the Potrero Grande Handicap for horses four years old and older. It was won by Hi-Yu Stable's Washington State bred Chinook Pass, who was ridden by US Hall of Fame jockey Laffit Pincay Jr. in a time of 1:14 3/5. Chinook Pass would continue on a superb season with several more wins on the Southern California circuit, culminating in him being crowned as U.S. Champion Sprint Horse for that year.

The event was named after Rancho Potrero Grande, a Mexican land grant in modern-day Los Angeles County, California. Today, the event is located in Rosemead and South El Monte, about 6 miles from Santa Anita Racetrack in Arcadia.

The event was upgraded to a Grade III in 1988. That year, the event attracted only three starters, with Gulch winning in an upset victory over the 1987 Breeders' Cup Sprint winner and 1/2 odds favorite Very Subtle by a 1 1/4 length margin. Gulch went on to win the Breeders' Cup Sprint and was crowned the U.S. Champion Sprint Horse.

Noticing the quality of horses who were winning, the American Graded Stakes Committee of the Thoroughbred Owners and Breeders Association upgraded the event to a Grade II in 1997.

Between 1996 and 2007, the Breeders' Cup sponsored the event, which was reflected in the name of the event.

The event was held on the All Weather synthetic track between 2008 and 2010. When they returned to holding the event on the dirt track in 2011, the conditions of the event were modified from handicap to an allowance.

In 2015 the administration of the Los Angeles Turf Club renamed the event to the Kona Gold Stakes in honor of the dual winner of the event (2000 and 2001) Kona Gold and third place winner of the 2003 race. Kona Gold held an outstanding record at Santa Anita Park, with many wins on the Southern California circuit. His most important win was in the 2000 Breeders' Cup Sprint. This win was vital in him being awarded the U.S. Champion Sprint Horse.

In 2020, due to the COVID-19 pandemic in the United States, Santa Anita closed their track and the event was cancelled. In 2021, Cezanne defeated three other starters by a new record margin of 9 3/4 lengths breaking a 31 year record that was set by Olympic Prospect in 1990 of seven lengths.

Other horses that have won this event and have gone on to win the Breeders' Cup Sprint later in their career include Cardmania, Lit de Justice and Amazombie. The 2002 winner Kalookan Queen is the only mare to have won the event.

In 2024 the event was downgraded by the Thoroughbred Owners and Breeders Association to Listed status.

== Records ==
Speed record:

- 1:13.71 – Son Of A Pistol (1998)

Margins:

- 9 3/4 lengths – Cezanne (2021)

Most wins:

- 2 – Kona Gold (2000, 2001)
- 2 – Amazombie (2011, 2012)
- 2 – Brickyard Ride (2022, 2023)

Most wins by a jockey:

- 4 – Alex Solis (2000, 2001, 2002, 2006)
- 4 – Garrett K. Gomez (1998, 2005, 2010, 2013)

Most wins by a trainer:

- 6 – Bruce Headley (1986, 1998, 2000, 2001, 2002, 2006)

Most wins by an owner:

- 3 – Aase & Bruce Headley (2000, 2001, 2006)

== Winners ==
Year	Winner	Age	Jockey	Trainer	Owner	Distance	Time	Purse	Grade	Ref
Kona Gold Stakes
2024	The Chosen Vron	6	Hector Berrios	J. Eric Kruljac	J. Eric Kruljac, Robert Fetkin, Sondereker Racing & Richard Thornburgh	6 1/2 furlongs	1:14.82	$101,000	Listed	
2023	Brickyard Ride	6	Juan Hernandez	Craig Lewis	Alfred A. Pais	6 1/2 furlongs	1:15.84	$100,000	III	
2022	Brickyard Ride	5	Juan Hernandez	Craig Lewis	Alfred A. Pais	6 1/2 furlongs	1:15.07	$98,000	III	
2021	Cezanne	4	Flavien Prat	Bob Baffert	Derrick Smith, Mrs. John Magnier, Michael Tabor & St. Elias Stable	6 1/2 furlongs	1:14.71	$98,000	III	
2020	Race not held									
2019	Cistron	5	Victor Espinoza	John W. Sadler	Hronis Racing	6 1/2 furlongs	1:16.33	$200,000	II	
2018	Bobby Abu Dhabi	4	Victor Espinoza	Peter L. Miller	Rockingham Ranch & David A Bernsen	6 1/2 furlongs	1:15.40	$196,345	II	
2017	Ransom the Moon	5	Flavien Prat	Philip D'Amato	Agave Racing Stable & Jeffrey Wilke	6 1/2 furlongs	1:15.10	$201,035	II	
2016	Wild Dude	6	Rafael Bejarano	Jerry Hollendorfer	Green Smith Jr & Jerry Hollendorfer	6 1/2 furlongs	1:15.10	$201,035	II	
2015	Masochistic	5	Tyler Baze	Ronald W. Ellis	Los Pollos Hermanos Racing & Jay Em Ess Stable	6 1/2 furlongs	1:14.69	$200,250	II	
Potrero Grande Stakes
2014	Big Macher	4	Tyler Baze	Richard Baltas	Thomas Mansor & Tachycardia Stables	6 1/2 furlongs	1:14.97	$200,750	II	
2013	Jimmy Creed	4	Garrett K. Gomez	Richard E. Mandella	Spendthrift Farm	6 1/2 furlongs	1:15.03	$150,250	II	
2012	Amazombie	6	Mike E. Smith	William Spawr	Thomas C. Sanford & William Spawr	6 1/2 furlongs	1:14.16	$150,000	II	
2011	Amazombie	5	Mike E. Smith	William Spawr	Thomas C. Sanford & William Spawr	6 1/2 furlongs	1:14.26	$150,000	II	
Potrero Grande Handicap
2010	Ventana	4	Garrett K. Gomez	Bob Baffert	Karl Watson, Michael E. Pegram & Paul Weitman	6 1/2 furlongs	1:15.03	$150,000	II	
2009	Soul City Slew	6	Michael C. Baze	Jack Carava	La Canada Stables	6 1/2 furlongs	1:14.79	$126,000	II	
2008	Greg's Gold	7	Victor Espinoza	David E. Hofmans	William R. Boswell	6 1/2 furlongs	1:14.62	$200,000	II	
2007	Smokey Stover	4	Aaron Gryder	Greg Gilchrist	Harry J. Aleo	6 1/2 furlongs	1:14.83	$192,000	II	
2006	Surf Cat	4	Alex O. Solis	Bruce Headley	Aase Headley & Marsha Naify	6 1/2 furlongs	1:15.00	$128,000	II	
2005	Harvard Avenue	4	Garrett K. Gomez	Doug F. O'Neill	Ron Crockett	6 1/2 furlongs	1:16.12	$194,000	II	
2004	McCann's Mojave	4	Jose Valdivia Jr.	Leonard Dorfman	Mike Willman	6 1/2 furlongs	1:15.60	$122,488	II	
2003	Bluesthestandard	6	Mike E. Smith	Ted H. West	Jeffrey Sengara	6 1/2 furlongs	1:14.86	$134,000	II	
2002	§ Kalookan Queen	6	Alex O. Solis	Bruce Headley	Louis Asistio	6 1/2 furlongs	1:15.31	$197,700	II	
2001	Kona Gold	7	Alex O. Solis	Bruce Headley	Bruce Headley, Irwin & Andrew Molasky, et al.	6 1/2 furlongs	1:15.03	$200,900	II	
2000	Kona Gold	6	Alex O. Solis	Bruce Headley	Bruce Headley, Irwin & Andrew Molasky, et al.	6 1/2 furlongs	1:14.75	$200,998	II	
1999	Big Jag	6	Jose Valdivia Jr.	Tim Pinfield	Julius H. Zolezzi	6 1/2 furlongs	1:15.09	$194,200	II	
1998	Son of a Pistol	6	Garrett K. Gomez	Bruce Headley	Luis Asistio, B.B.C. Stables & Jeff Davenport	6 1/2 furlongs	1:13.71	$130,700	II	
1997	First Intent	8	Rene R. Douglas	Jack Carava	Lima Family Trust	6 1/2 furlongs	1:14.75	$144,250	II	
1996	Abaginone	5	Gary L. Stevens	Sanford Shulman	Ronald L. Charles & Clear Valley Stables	6 1/2 furlongs	1:14.59	$202,400	III	
1995	Lit de Justice	5	Corey Nakatani	Jenine Sahadi	Evergreen Farm	6 1/2 furlongs	1:14.65	$100,000	III	
1994	Sir Hutch	4	Pat Valenzuela	Bob Baffert	Robert & Beverly Lewis	6 1/2 furlongs	1:14.48	$106,100	III	
1993	Gray Slewpy	5	Kent J. Desormeaux	Dan L. Hendricks	Ed Friendly	6 1/2 furlongs	1:14.91	$109,700	III	
1992	Cardmania	6	Eddie Delahoussaye	Myriam Bollack	Jean Couvercelle	6 1/2 furlongs	1:17.16	$102,700	III	
1991	Jacodra	4	Corey Nakatani	Hector O. Palma	Paul & Andrena Van Doren	6 1/2 furlongs	1:15.00	$107,300	III	
1990	Olympic Prospect	6	Pat Valenzuela	John W. Sadler	Gregg Alsdorf, Lawrence Opas & Frank Sinatra	6 1/2 furlongs	1:14.20	$102,900	III	
1989	On the Line	5	Gary L. Stevens	D. Wayne Lukas	Eugene V. Klein	6 1/2 furlongs	1:14.00	$111,500	III	
1988	Gulch	4	Eddie Delahoussaye	D. Wayne Lukas	Peter M. Brant	6 1/2 furlongs	1:15.00	$70,300	III	
1987	Zabaleta	4	Laffit Pincay Jr.	John Gosden	Michael D. Riordan (Lessee)	6 1/2 furlongs	1:15.00	$78,975		
1986	Halo Folks	5	Chris McCarron	Bruce Headley	Betty, E.W. & Judy Johnston family & Kjell Qvale	6 1/2 furlongs	1:15.60	$74,550		
1985	Fifty Six Ina Row	4	Laffit Pincay Jr.	Irv Guiney	John Valpredo	6 1/2 furlongs	1:15.40	$76,150		
1984	Honeyland	5	Bill Shoemaker	Charles E. Whittingham	Summa Stable & Sidney L. Port	6 1/2 furlongs	1:15.40	$67,450		
1983	Chinook Pass	4	Laffit Pincay Jr.	Laurie N. Anderson	Hi-Yu Stable	6 1/2 furlongs	1:14.60	$64,050		

Legend:
All Weather Track Dirt

Notes:
§ Ran as part of an entry

== See also ==
List of American and Canadian Graded races
