= Whitmore Stakes =

Horse race in the United States

- Class: Grade III
- Location: Oaklawn Park, Hot Springs, Arkansas, United States
- Inaugurated: 1944 (as Hot Springs Purse)
- Race type: Thoroughbred - Flat racing
- Website: Oaklawn Park

Race information
- Distance: 6 furlongs
- Surface: Dirt
- Track: left-handed
- Qualification: Four-year-olds and older
- Weight: 124 lbs. with allowances
- Purse: $250,000 (since 2024)

The Whitmore Stakes is a Grade III American Thoroughbred horse race for four-year-olds and older at a distance of six furlongs on the dirt run annually in March at Oaklawn Park Race Track in Hot Springs, Arkansas. The event currently offers a purse of $250,000.

== History ==
The February 28, 1944 inaugural running of the event as the Hot Springs Purse at six furlongs was run on a heavy track. The race was won by Momo Flag, owned and trained by Adelard Lamoureux and ridden by Cuban jockey Jorge Alfonso. On November 15, 1944, Momo Flag showed he was far more than just a sprinter when he won the Exterminator Handicap at Pimlico Race Course over the marathon distance of two miles and 70 yards. Remarkably, after that grueling distance to the finish line, Momo Flag only beat Miss Ruth McClanaghan's Harford by a nose. The following year the event was run in early December as the Hot Springs Handicap for two-year-olds over a distance of one mile and seventy yards. The event was idle for the next two calendar years.

=== For three-year-olds (1948–74) ===
In 1948, when the event was resumed the Oaklawn Park administration set the conditions of the event for three-year-olds only at a distance of six furlongs. The event was scheduled earlier in the Oaklawn Park season and it became a preparatory race for the Arkansas Derby. Enforcer who finished second to Cotton Joe in the 1948 renewal also finished second in the Arkansas Derby.

In 1951, the event was scheduled to be run on Saturday, March 3 but there were not enough entries to fill the event so the track administration scheduled an event that was called the Mountain Valley Allowance for a much lower purse of $1,500. Eleven three-year-olds entered for this event.

The first horse to win the Hot Springs Handicap and then go on to win the Arkansas Derby was Mrs. Elizabeth Muckler's Johns Chic who won the double in 1956. In 1965 Earl Allen's Swift Ruler would also win the Hot Springs Handicap, the Rebel Stakes (introduced for three-year-olds in 1961) and the Arkansas Derby.

In 1966 the event was run at a distance of 5 1/2 furlongs for the only time. In 1967 Dr. Keith Knapp's Roman K. set a new track record for the six furlongs distance of 1:09 flat defeating seven other three-year-olds.

As a Three-Year-Old handicap five fillies won the event. The most successful of the fillies was the 1957 winner Lori El. She was a gallant third in the Arkansas Derby and later in May won the Kentucky Oaks.

In 1974 the event was run for the last time as a Three-Year-Old only event and the winner, J. R.'s Pet won by a seven-length margin which continues to date to be the record winning margin. J. R.'s Pet also went on to win the Arkansas Derby.

=== Open era (1975 onwards) ===
With the creation of new events for three-year-olds, Rebel Stakes in 1961 and the Southwest Stakes in 1968 over six furlongs, Oaklawn Park administration changed the condition of the event in 1975 to three-year-olds and older. Three years later in 1978 the event would omit three-year-olds all together as the conditions for the event became four-year-olds and older.

In 1986 the distance of the event was increased to one mile, but this only lasted for three years. In 1988 the conditions of the event were changed from a handicap to a stakes event with allowances and the name changed to the Hot Springs Stakes.

Wilbur M. Giles' gelding E J Harley won the race in three consecutive years (1998, 1999, 2000). The 2014 winner Work All Week went on to win that year's Breeders' Cup Sprint and would be voted American Champion Sprint Horse.

The event encountered its third dead heat result in 2009, thirty years after the first dead heat which took place in 1979.

With increased revenue from the racino the administration of the track in 2017 began increasing the purse offered for the event. In 2017 the event offered $125,000 and by 2021 an attractive purse of $200,000 was up for grabs. This increase in stakes started to attract much more accomplished sprinters such as Breeders' Cup Sprint winner and US Champion Sprint Horse, Whitmore. In September 2021, Oaklawn Park announced that the Hot Springs Stakes would be renamed to the Whitmore Stakes, after retired thoroughbred sprinter Whitmore. Owned by the partnership group of Robert LaPenta, trainer Ron Moquett and Head of Plains Partners, Whitmore broke E J Harley's record with four consecutive Hot Springs Stakes wins between 2017 and 2020.

In 2022 the American Graded Stakes Committee upgraded the classification of the event after 75 runnings to Grade III.

== Records ==
Speed record:

- 6 furlongs: 1:08.40 – Double Ready (1984)

Margins:

- 7 lengths – J. R.'s Pet (1974)

Most wins:

- 4 – Whitmore (2017, 2018, 2019, 2020)

Most wins by an owner:

- 4 – Robert V. LaPenta & Head of Plains Partners (2017, 2018, 2019, 2020)

Most wins by a jockey:

- 4 – Pat Day (1986, 1991, 1992, 1995)

Most wins by a trainer:

- 5 – Robert E. Holthus (1989, 1991, 1992, 2002, 2004)
- 5 – Ron Moquett (2015, 2017, 2018, 2019, 2020)

== Winners ==
Year	Winner	Age	Jockey	Trainer	Owner	Distance	Time	Purse	Grade	Ref
Whitmore Stakes
2026	Tejano Twist	7	Francisco Arrieta	Chris A. Harman	JD Thoroughbreds & Joey Keith Davis	6 furlongs	1:08.93	$250,000	III	
2025	Booth	4	Erik Asmussen	Steven M. Asmussen	Heiligbrodt, L. William, Heiligbrodt, Corinne, Jackpot Farm and Whispering Oaks Farm LLC	6 furlongs	1:09.79	$250,000	III	
2024	Jaxon Traveler	6	Flavien Prat	Steven M. Asmussen	West Point Thoroughbreds	6 furlongs	1:10.04	$250,000	III	
2023	Tejano Twist	4	Francisco Arrieta	Chris Hartman	JD Thoroughbreds & Joey Keith Davis	6 furlongs	1:09.27	$200,000	III	
2022	Bob's Edge	4	Luis S. Quinonez	J. Larry Jones	Michael, Patricia & Taylor, Freeny & Jennifer Grayson	6 furlongs	1:09.42	$200,000	III	
Hot Spring Stakes
2021	C Z Rocket	7	Florent Geroux	Peter L. Miller	Madaket Stables, Gary Barber & Tom Kagele	6 furlongs	1:09.04	$200,000	Listed	
2020	Whitmore	7	Joseph Talamo	Ron Moquett	Robert V. LaPenta, Southern Springs Stables & Head of Plains Partners	6 furlongs	1:08.54	$147,000	Listed	
2019	Whitmore	6	Ricardo Santana Jr.	Ron Moquett	Robert V. LaPenta, Southern Springs Stables & Head of Plains Partners	6 furlongs	1:09.39	$146,250	Listed	
2018	Whitmore	5	Ricardo Santana Jr.	Ron Moquett	Robert V. LaPenta, Southern Springs Stables & Head of Plains Partners	6 furlongs	1:08.57	$125,000	Listed	
2017	Whitmore	4	Ricardo Santana Jr.	Ron Moquett	Robert V. LaPenta, Harry T. Rosenblum & Head of Plains Partners	6 furlongs	1:08.72	$125,000	Listed	
2016	Subtle Indian	4	Ramon Vazquez	Robertino Diodoro	Mercedes Stables	6 furlongs	1:09.28	$100,000	Listed	
2015	Gentlemen's Bet	6	Ramon Vazquez	Ron Moquett	Harry T. Rosenblum	6 furlongs	1:09.67	$100,000	Listed	
2014	Work All Week	5	Christopher A. Emigh	Roger Brueggemann	Midwest Thoroughbreds	6 furlongs	1:09.84	$100,000	Listed	
2013	Laurie's Rocket	4	Victor Lebron	Willis D. Horton	D. Wayne Lukas	6 furlongs	1:11.14	$73,500	Listed	
2012	City Sage	4	Calvin H. Borel	Kelly Von Hemel	William J. Sims	6 furlongs	1:10.36	$75,000	Listed	
2011	Chief of Affairs	6	M. Clifton Berry	Randy L. Morse	Wayne Sanders & Larry Hirsch	6 furlongs	1:08.56	$73,500		
2010	Country Day	4	Brian Hernandez Jr.	Steve Margolis	Bertram, Elaine & Richard Klein	6 furlongs	1:09.52	$60,000		
2009	Red Hot N Gold	5	Eusebio Razo Jr.	Kelly Von Hemel	RPM Thoroughbreds	6 furlongs	1:09.58	$50,000		Dead heat
2009	Silver Edition	4	Terry Thompson	D. Wayne Lukas	Thomas F. Van Meter II & Phillip Maloof	6 furlongs	1:09.58	$50,000		Dead heat
2008	Junior College	6	Eusebio Razo Jr.	Anthony Reinstedler	Mjaka Stables	6 furlongs	1:09.85	$50,000		
2007	Junior College	5	John Jacinto	Anthony Reinstedler	Mjaka Stables	6 furlongs	1:10.05	$50,000		
2006	That Tat	8	M. Clifton Berry	Cole Norman	Ken Murphy Thoroughbreds	6 furlongs	1:10.47	$50,000		
2005	That Tat	7	Jamie Theriot	Cole Norman	Ken Murphy Thoroughbreds	6 furlongs	1:10.23	$49,000		
2004	Skeet	4	John McKee	Robert E. Holthus	Fly Racing	6 furlongs	1:09.22	$49,000		
2003	Honor Me	4	Rodney Trader	Stanley Roberts	Hwy 1 Racing Stable	6 furlongs	1:09.82	$50,000		
2002	Beau's Town	4	Anthony Lovato	Cole Norman	David J. Hulkewicz	6 furlongs	1:09.14	$50,000		Dead heat
2002	Kings Command	5	Luis S. Quinonez	Robert E. Holthus	Eugene L. Grando	6 furlongs	1:09.14	$50,000		Dead heat
2001	Bidis	4	Joseph C. Judice	Jesse N. Wigginton	Ross Harris	6 furlongs	1:10.09	$50,000	Listed	
2000	E J Harley	8	James Lopez	David R. Vance	Wilbur M. Giles	6 furlongs	1:09.32	$50,000	Listed	
1999	E J Harley	7	James Lopez	David R. Vance	Wilbur M. Giles	6 furlongs	1:11.07	$50,000	Listed	
1998	E J Harley	6	James Lopez	David R. Vance	Wilbur M. Giles	6 furlongs	1:10.37	$56,000	Listed	
1997	Virtuous Regent	6	Jose Valdivia Jr.	Randy Morse	Michael P. Cloonan	6 furlongs	1:10.07	$54,500	Listed	
1996	Roythelittleone	4	Timothy Doocy	P. Noel Hickey	Kenny P. Smith	6 furlongs	1:10.00	$53,750	Listed	
1995	Groovy Jet	4	Pat Day	Morris Nicks	Don Eberts	6 furlongs	1:10.35	$59,750	Listed	
1994	Honor the Hero	6	Garrett K. Gomez	Doug Oliver	Allan Burdick, Arnulf & Rebecca Ueland	6 furlongs	1:09.68	$56,250	Listed	
1993	Callide Valley	5	Shane Romero	Orin J. Glass Jr.	Mary & Gary West	6 furlongs	1:09.18	$56,500	Listed	
1992	Potentiality	6	Pat Day	Robert E. Holthus	Halford E. Sutton & Daniel Jones	6 furlongs	1:11.08	$57,500	Listed	
1991	Overpeer (CAN)	7	Pat Day	Robert E. Holthus	Halford E. Sutton & Daniel Jones	6 furlongs	1:08.98	$56,400	Listed	
1990	Forli Light	4	David Guillory	Larry Robideaux Jr.	David Beard	6 furlongs	1:09.40	$61,350		
1989	Proper Reality	4	Jerry D. Bailey	Robert E. Holthus	Mrs. James A. Winn	6 furlongs	1:09.20	$60,750		
1988	Wayne's Crane	4	Donald L. Howard	Steve Chiasson	Kay & John DiPalma	1 mile	1:35.00	$58,050		
Hot Springs Handicap
1987	§ Swingin Sway	4	Donald Howard	Jack H. Gardes	Jack H. Gardes & Harry Rosenblum	1 mile	1:37.20	$61,900		
1986	Lucky North	5	Pat Day	William I. Mott	John A. Franks (Lessee)	1 mile	1:38.20	$61,500		
1985	Taylor's Special	4	Randy Romero	William I. Mott	William F. Lucas	6 furlongs	1:09.60	$56,500		
1984	Double Ready	4	Kerwin D. Clark	Randy C. Reed	R. B. Oliver	6 furlongs	1:08.40	$50,000		
1983	Dave's Friend	8	Larry Snyder	Jack C. Van Berg	John A. Franks	6 furlongs	1:11.20	$50,000		
1982	Skate	6	Kathleen Moore	James R. Garroutte	Pamela Kuehne	6 furlongs	1:11.80	$50,000		
1981	† J. Burns	5	Darrell Haire	J. Bert Sonnier	Jer Ed Farms	6 furlongs	1:12.60	$50,000		
1980	Braze And Bold	5	John Lively	Louis Brandt	Red Socks	6 furlongs	1:11.00	$50,000		
1979	Cheyenne Nation	5	Larry Melancon	Louis Brandt	Red Socks	6 furlongs	1:12.80	$50,000		Dead heat
1979	Cabrini Green	4	Michael Morgan	John P. James	Mrs. Joe W. Brown	6 furlongs	1:12.80	$50,000		Dead heat
1978	Last Buzz	5	Anthony Rini	George H. Hallock	Taylor Faulkner & Everett Lowrance	6 furlongs	1:09.80	$25,000		
1977	Silver Hope	6	Rudy L. Turcotte	Charles O. Battles	Mrs. Herman J. Udouj	6 furlongs	1:11.80	$25,000		
1976	Navajo	6	James D. Nichols	James O. Keefer	Joseph Stevenson & Raymond Stump	6 furlongs	1:10.20	$25,000		
1975	Prince Astro	6	David E. Whited	William C. Thomas	C. L. Warner	6 furlongs	1:09.80	$25,000		
1974	§ J. R.'s Pet	3	Darrel G. McHargue	Harold Tinker	W. Cal Partee	6 furlongs	1:12.20	$25,000		3YOs
1973	Starkers	3	Danny Gargan	Roy J. Gillem	Greentree Stables	6 furlongs	1:10.40	$25,000		3YOs
1972	ƒ Hempens Song	3	Phil Grimm	David R. Vance	Dan Lasater	6 furlongs	1:12.00	$20,000		3YOs
1971	Staunch Avenger	3	David E. Whited	Gin L. Collins	Annette Mann	6 furlongs	1:10.20	$15,000		3YOs
1970	Sado	3	William Fleming	Harold Tinker	W. Cal Partee	6 furlongs	1:10.80	$15,000		3YOs
1969	Chief Sun Dance	3	Michael McDowell	W. R. Morris	Forrest H. Lindsay	6 furlongs	1:13.20	$15,000		3YOs
1968	ƒ§ Crown Jem	3	Jimmy Curry	Leroy R. Smyser	Clay Stinson	6 furlongs	1:11.80	$10,000		3YOs
1967	Roman K.	3	William Whitt	Jean O. Brennan	Dr. Keith Knapp	6 furlongs	1:09.00	$10,000		3YOs
1966	He Jr.	3	Jack Fieselman	Richard Posey	Everett Lowrance	5 1/2 furlongs	1:04.20	$10,000		3YOs
1965	Swift Ruler	3	Larry R. Spraker	Gin L. Collins	Earl Allen	6 furlongs	1:10.20	$10,000		3YOs
1964	Floral Shop	3	Robert Nono	William H. Bishop	William H. Bishop Stable	6 furlongs	1:10.20	$10,000		3YOs
1963	Devil It Is	3	Robert Gallimore	Gino T. Alberico	Bar-El-Mar Stable	6 furlongs	1:10.80	$10,000		3YOs
1962	Killoqua	3	Kenward Bernis	W. Tomlinson	John D. Askew	6 furlongs	1:12.80	$10,000		3YOs
1961	Glencoe Kid	3	Larry Larkin	Douglas M. Davis Jr.	Alexander Harthill & Douglas M. Davis Jr.	6 furlongs	1:14.00	$10,000		3YOs
1960	Deemster	3	Alfonso Coy	Harold Tinker	August Muckler Jr.	6 furlongs	1:14.20	$10,000		3YOs
1959	Mail Order	3	John R. Adams	Larry H. Thompson	Alamode Farm	6 furlongs	1:13.20	$5,000		3YOs
1958	§ Clem Kelly	3	Johnny Sellers	Al J. Horton	Harry Hough	6 furlongs	1:10.40	$5,000		3YOs
1957	ƒ Lori-El	3	Howard Craig	Michael R. Soto	Michael R. Soto & Alex E. Berke	6 furlongs	1:12.40	$5,000		3YOs
1956	John's Chic	3	John L. Rotz	Logan Fischer	Mrs. Elizabeth Muckler	6 furlongs	1:10.80	$5,000		3YOs
1955	Trim Destiny	3	Lois C. Cook	Cecil Locklear	George Rollie White	6 furlongs	1:10.80	$5,000		3YOs
1954	ƒ Lori Jane	3	Ralph Borgemenke	M. Smith	Mrs. Vera E. Smith	6 furlongs	1:13.00	$5,000		3YOs
1953	ƒ Sherry L	3	Hubert Trent	Henry Forrest	Greenacres Stock Farm	6 furlongs	1:11.40	$5,000		3YOs
1952	§ Robert	3	John Heckman	Robert V. McGarvey	Emil Denemark Jr.	6 furlongs	1:10.40	$5,000		3YOs
1951	Race not held									
1950	§ Futuramatic	3	Job Dean Jessop	Robert V. McGarvey	Mrs. Emil Denemark	6 furlongs	1:12.40	$5,575		3YOs
1949	§ Provocative	3	William Parnell	Robert V. McGarvey	Mrs. Emil Denemark	6 furlongs	1:12.40	$5,800		3YOs
1948	Cotton Joe	3	Wendell Eads	Henry Forrest	Henry Forrest	6 furlongs	1:12.80	$5,700		3YOs
1946–1947		Race not held								
1945	Ariel Ace	2	Arthur Craig	Charles Sanborn	David Ferguson	1 mile & 70 yards	1:42.20	$1,500		2YO
Hot Springs Purse
1944	Momo Flag	4	Jorge Alfonso	Adelard Lamoureux	Adelard Lamoureux	6 furlongs	1:17.20	$1,000		

Notes:
§ Ran as an entry
ƒ Filly or Mare
† In the 1981 running Gallant Serenade was first past the post but later was disqualified from the winner's prize money after failing a post race drug test. J Burns was declared the winner and all placegetters were moved up, Convenient to second and Royal Vertex to third. Trainer of Gallant Serenade, James R. Garroutte was suspended for the remainder of the Oaklawn season.

== See also ==
- List of American and Canadian Graded races
