= Blue Norther =

Blue Norther may refer to:

- Blue Norther (weather)
- Blue Norther (horse)
- Blue Norther Stakes annual horse race
