= Jeff Mullins =

Jeff Mullins may refer to:

- Jeff Mullins (basketball), American basketball player
- Jeff Mullins (horse trainer), American racehorse trainer
