= Lit de Justice =

American-bred Thoroughbred racehorse

- Sire: El Gran Senor
- Grandsire: Northern Dancer
- Dam: Kanmary
- Damsire: Kenmare
- Sex: Stallion
- Foaled: 1990
- Country: United States
- Colour: Gray
- Breeder: Swettenham Stud
- Owner: 1) Mise de Moratalla; 2) Evergreen Farm
- Trainer: 1) Alain de Royer-Dupré; 2) Jenine Sahadi
- Record: 36: 10–8–6
- Earnings: $1,397,649

Major wins
- Potrero Grande Handicap (1995); Pat O'Brien Breeders' Cup Handicap (1995); Bing Crosby Breeders' Cup Handicap (1996); Palos Verdes Handicap (1996); El Conejo Handicap (1996) Breeders' Cup wins: Breeders' Cup Sprint (1996)

Awards
- American Champion Sprint Horse (1996)

Lit de Justice (January 12, 1990 – July 20, 2012) was an American Champion Thoroughbred racehorse. He was bred by Robert Sangster's Swettenham Stud and purchased by the French racing operation Mise de Moratalla, who named him for a famous Parlement of Paris known as the Lit de justice. The colt was sired by El Gran Senor, who was an outstanding son of Northern Dancer and earned Irish and English Champion honours at age two in 1983 and at three in 1984. He was out of the mare Kanmary, whose sire Kenmare was a French Group One winner and the Leading sire in France in 1988 and 1989.

Trained by Alain de Royer-Dupré to run on European turf courses, Lit de Justice began racing at age two. On August 1, 1992, he finished fourth in his debut at Deauville-La Touques Racecourse. Winless at ages two and three, Lit de Justice got his first victory in his thirteenth start on June 4, 1994, in the Prix Durbar at Maisons-Laffitte Racecourse. He made one more winless start in France before being sold on July 17, 1994, to Carol and Cornelius Ray's Evergreen Farm located near Paris, Kentucky. The Rays turned Lit de Justice over to California trainer Jenine Sahadi, who conditioned the horse for racing on dirt at Del Mar Racetrack.

After a second-place finish in his American debut in a minor race on July 30, 1994, at Del Mar Racetrack, on August 27, Lit de Justice got his first American win. As a five-year-old, he won the Potrero Grande Handicap and then set a new Del Mar track record for seven furlongs in winning the Pat O'Brien Breeders' Cup Handicap before finishing third in the Breeders' Cup Sprint behind winner Desert Stormer.

At age six, Lit de Justice won four of his seven starts to go with two third-place finishes. Among his wins, he set a new Santa Anita Park track record for 5 1/2 furlongs in the El Conejo Handicap. His fourth win of 1996, and most important of his career, came in the Breeders' Cup Sprint at Woodbine Racetrack in Toronto, Ontario, Canada. Sent off as the betting favorite under regular jockey Corey Nakatani, Lit de Justice won by coming from last to first in the fourteen-horse-field, defeating top runners including Honour and Glory (3rd) and Langfuhr (8th). His winning time tied a Woodbine track record that had stood for twenty-three years. The win was the first in a Breeders' Cup race for jockey Nakatani. For trainer Sahadi, it was not just her first Breeders' Cup victory, but the first by a female trainer in Breeders' Cup history.

For his 1996 performances, Lit de Justice was voted the Eclipse Award for American Champion Sprint Horse.

== As a sire ==
Retired after his Breeders' Cup win, Lit de Justice stood at stud at the Kentucky division of Frank Stronach's Adena Springs. While none of his offspring have achieved Lit de Justice's success, he sired a number of very good runners and stakes race winners and is the damsire of 2008 Canadian Classic winner Harlem Rocker. In 2003, Lit de Justice was sold to Magali Farms near Santa Ynez, California. On July 20, 2012, he died from the infirmities of old age at the age of 22.
