= Work All Week =

American-bred Thoroughbred racehorse (2009–2023)

- Sire: City Zip
- Grandsire: Carson City
- Dam: Danzig Matilda
- Damsire: Repriced
- Sex: Gelding
- Foaled: March 9, 2009
- Died: November 13, 2023 (aged 14)
- Country: United States
- Colour: Chestnut
- Breeder: Midwest Thoroughbreds Inc
- Owner: Midwest Thoroughbreds Inc
- Trainer: Richard Brueggemann
- Record: 19: 13-4-1
- Earnings: $1,511,071

Major wins
- Tex's Zing Stakes (2013); Lightning Jet Handicap (2013); Hot Springs Stakes (2014); Iowa Sprint Handicap (2014); Phoenix Stakes (2014) Breeders' Cup wins: Breeders' Cup Sprint (2014)

Awards
- American Champion Sprint Horse (2014)

Work All Week (March 9, 2009 – November 13, 2023) was an American Thoroughbred racehorse. A specialist sprinter bred in Illinois, he had won twelve of his fifteen races. He spent most of his career racing in the Mid-West winning races such as the Tex's Zing Stakes, Lightning Jet Handicap, Hot Springs Stakes and Iowa Sprint Handicap. In the autumn of 2014, he was moved up in class and won the Phoenix Stakes at Keeneland and followed up with an upset win over a strong field in the Breeders' Cup Sprint. In January 2015, he was named American Champion Sprint Horse at the Eclipse Awards.

== Background ==
Work All Week was a chestnut gelding with a white blaze bred in Illinois by Richard and Karen Papiese's Midwest Thoroughbreds Inc. His sire City Zip, a half-brother to Ghostzapper, showed his best form as a two-year-old in 2000 when he won the Hopeful Stakes and dead-heated for first place in the Belmont Futurity. His other progeny have included the American Champion Female Turf Horse Dayatthespa. Work All Week's dam Danzig Matilda won seven minor races in twenty-nine starts between 1999 and 2001.

Midwest Thoroughbreds, previously best known for their successes in claiming races, sent the horse into training with Richard Brueggemann. His nickname is "Workers" and he was reportedly fond of Peppermints.

== Racing career ==
=== 2012: three-year-old season ===
Work All Week did not race as a juvenile and ran only once as a three-year-old in 2012. On 11 November he contested a maiden race over one and one-sixteenth of a mile at Hawthorne Race Course near Chicago and finished sixth of the ten runners behind Big Man In Black.

=== 2013: four-year-old season ===
As a four-year-old, Work All Week was campaigned over sprint distances and won seven of his eight races, competing mainly in the Mid-West. After winning a six furlong maiden by six and three quarter lengths at Hawthorne on March 22, he won an allowance race at the same track a month later, beating his opponents by more than twelve lengths at odds of 0.7/1. He was then switched to the synthetic Polytrack surface at Arlington Park in May and won a six-furlong allowance by more than five lengths. Over the same course and distance in June, he started 1/5 favourite for the Addison Cammack Handicap (restricted to horses bred in Illinois), but sustained his only defeat of the year when he was caught in the final strides and beaten a nose by the gelding Sweet Luca.

Work All Week returned to win allowance races at Arlington in July Indiana Grand Race Course in August, before venturing to southern Illinois to contest the Tex's Zing Stakes at Fairmount Park located in Collinsville, Illinois, in September. Ridden by Francisco Torres, he led from the start and won by one and a quarter lengths from his stablemate Signsealdeliver. On his final appearance of the year, he faced Sweet Luca and Signsealdeliver in the Lightning Jet Handicap at Hawthorne in November and was made the 3/5 favourite. Torres again sent the gelding into the lead from the start and he opened up a clear lead in the first quarter mile before winning by one and a half lengths from Four Left Feet, Sweet Luca and Signsealdeliver.

=== 2014: five-year-old season ===
Work All Week moved south in early 2014, having his first two races of the year at Oaklawn Park in Arkansas. After winning an allowance race over five and a half furlongs on January 19 he started favourite for the Hot Springs Stakes on March 8 and led from the start to win by one and a half lengths from Alsvid. After a break of over three months, the gelding reappeared in the Iowa Sprint Handicap at Prairie Meadows on June 28 on a muddy track against five opponents. Ridden as in the Hot Springs Stakes by Christopher Emigh he went to the front from the start and then rallied after being overtaken in the straight to regain the lead and win by half a length from the favoured Delaunay. A month later Work All Week made his second attempt to win the Addison Cammack Handicap and started 7/10 favourite under top weight of 130 pounds. After taking the lead in the straight he opened up a clear lead but was overtaken in the final strides and beaten again by Sweet Luca.

On his fourteenth track appearance, in the autumn of his five-year-old season, Work All Week was moved up to Grade III class for the first time when he contested the Stoll Keenon Ogden Phoenix Stakes over six furlongs at Keeneland Racecourse. Florent Geroux, who had partnered the horse in some of his early races, took over the ride from Emigh and Work All Week started the 11/5 favourite against six opponents. The gelding vied for the lead from the start, went clear of the field entering the stretch and held on to win by a length from the three-year-old C.Zee. After the race Geroux commented: "Work All Week loves to win. He's 11 for 14 now. He's a very special horse. He's run some big races before, and today he proved now he's probably the best sprinter in the country". When asked about running the horse in the Breeders' Cup, Richard Papiese said "We'll see how he comes out of this, and if he comes out good, then yes, we'll go to California".

On November 1, Work All Week, with Geroux again in the saddle was one of fourteen horses to contest the thirty-first running of the Breeders' Cup Sprint, run that year at Santa Anita Park in California. He started a 20/1 outsider against opponents including the Hong Kong-trained Rich Tapestry (winner of the Santa Anita Sprint Championship on his American debut), Secret Circle (winner of the race in 2013), Private Zone (Vosburgh Stakes), Palace (Forego Stakes) and Big Macher (Bing Crosby Handicap). Breaking quickly from a wide draw, the gelding settled in second place behind the four-year-old colt Fast Anna who set a very fast pace (21.19 for the first quarter mile). Work All Week moved up on the outside of Fast Anna to take the lead entering the straight, went clear of the field, and held off a late challenge from Secret Circle to win by half a length with Private Zone third ahead of Bourbon Courage and Fast Anna. Geroux described the win as "a dream come true" and added "To compete in these races and win on the first try is unbelievable, especially with a horse from home. Today was the real test to see if he can go with the best sprinters in the country, and he just did it". Brueggemann commented "He just does everything we ask, and how can you not be confident in him? They kept saying we didn't beat anybody, but I wonder what they'll say now". Work All Week was the second Illinois-bred horse to win a Breeder's Cup race after Buck's Boy in the 1998 Turf.

In the Eclipse Awards for 2014, Work All Week was voted American Champion Sprint Horse taking 184 of the 265 votes ahead of Goldencents (52 votes) and Palace (12 votes).

=== 2015: six-year-old season ===
Work All Week ran four times in 2015, winning a listed stakes race at Mountaineer Park and placing in three other graded stakes. He was retired following a third-place finish in the Phoenix at Keeneland after a stress fracture was discovered in his right knee.

== Retirement and death ==
Work All Week became a stable pony for Brueggemann shortly after his retirement. In 2020 Midwest Thoroughbreds moved Work All Week to Old Friends Equine, a dedicated retirement farm in Georgetown, Kentucky. He died after suffering a paddock accident on November 13, 2023, at the age of 14.

== Pedigree ==
Pedigree of Work All Week, chestnut gelding, 2009
Sire City Zip (USA) 1998	Carson City (USA); 1987	Mr. Prospector	Raise a Native
Sire City Zip (USA) 1998	Carson City (USA); 1987	Mr. Prospector	Gold Digger
Sire City Zip (USA) 1998	Carson City (USA); 1987	Blushing Promise	Blushing Groom
Sire City Zip (USA) 1998	Carson City (USA); 1987	Blushing Promise	Summertime Promise
Sire City Zip (USA) 1998	Baby Zip (USA); 1991	Relaunch	In Reality
Sire City Zip (USA) 1998	Baby Zip (USA); 1991	Relaunch	Foggy Note
Sire City Zip (USA) 1998	Baby Zip (USA); 1991	Thirty Zip	Tri Jet
Sire City Zip (USA) 1998	Baby Zip (USA); 1991	Thirty Zip	Sailaway
Dam Danzig Matilda (USA) 1997	Repriced (USA); 1988	Roberto	Hail To Reason
Dam Danzig Matilda (USA) 1997	Repriced (USA); 1988	Roberto	Bramalea
Dam Danzig Matilda (USA) 1997	Repriced (USA); 1988	Feature Price	Quack
Dam Danzig Matilda (USA) 1997	Repriced (USA); 1988	Feature Price	Shelf Talker
Dam Danzig Matilda (USA) 1997	Danzig's Orphan (USA); 1990	A Native Danzig	Danzig
Dam Danzig Matilda (USA) 1997	Danzig's Orphan (USA); 1990	A Native Danzig	Lucy Belle
Dam Danzig Matilda (USA) 1997	Danzig's Orphan (USA); 1990	J'Accuse Fromage	Jean-Pierre
Dam Danzig Matilda (USA) 1997	Danzig's Orphan (USA); 1990	J'Accuse Fromage	Courthouse (Family: 4-c)
