= Buena Vista Stakes =

- Class: Grade II
- Location: Santa Anita Park; Arcadia, California, United States
- Inaugurated: 1988 (as Buena Vista Handicap)
- Race type: Thoroughbred - Flat racing
- Website: www.santaanita.com

Race information
- Distance: 1 mile (8 furlongs)
- Surface: Turf
- Track: Left-handed
- Qualification: Fillies and mares, four-years-old and older
- Weight: 124 lbs with allowances
- Purse: $200,000 (since 2014)

The Buena Vista Stakes is a Grade II American Thoroughbred horse race for fillies and mares aged four years old or older over the distance of one mile on the turf scheduled annually in February at Santa Anita Park in Arcadia, California. The event currently carries a purse of $200,000.

== History ==
The inaugural running of the event was on 5 March 1988 as the Buena Vista Handicap with the Julio Canani trained Davie's Lamb ridden by Fernando Toro winning comfortably by 1 3/4 lengths in a time of 1:39 flat.

In 1990 the event was classified as a Grade III.

The Buena Vista Handicap was run in two divisions in 1992.

The event was upgraded to Grade II status in 1995.

The event run as a handicap through 2012 but since has been run under allowance weight conditions and renamed to the Buena Vista Stakes.

It was taken off the turf and run on the dirt course in 2017 due to poor conditions on the turf course. When a graded stakes is taken off the turf, the race is automatically downgraded one level for that running only. After the race, the American Graded Stakes Committee meets to review the race's running and determine if its former status should be reinstated. In the case of the 2017 Buena Vista Stakes, it was decided that the race's status would not be reinstated and as such it was recorded as a Grade III event.

== Records ==
Speed record:

- 1:33.33 - Pontchatrain (2014)

Margins:

- 3 1/2 lengths – Wild At Heart (2017)

Most wins:

- No horse has won this race more than once.

Most wins by an owner:

- 4 - Juddmonte Farms (1994, 1997, 2008, 2009)

Most wins by a jockey:

- 5 - Gary Stevens (1996, 2004, 2014, 2015, 2016)

Most wins by a trainer:

- 5 - Robert J. Frankel (1994, 1997, 2003, 2008, 2009)

== Winners ==
Year	Winner	Age	Jockey	Trainer	Owner	Distance	Time	Purse	Grade	Ref
Buena Vista Stakes
2026	Thought Process	4	Hector Berrios	Philip D'Amato	Estate of Brereton C. Jones, Little Red Feather Racing & Madaket Stables	1 mile	1:34.20	$200,500	II	
2025	Liguria	5	Flavien Prat	Michael W. McCarthy	Alpha Delta Stables	1 mile	1:34.31	$200,500	II	
2024	Ruby Nell	4	Edwin Maldonado	Richard E. Mandella	Spendthrift Farm	1 mile	1:35.01	$202,000	II	
2023	Quattroelle (IRE)	5	Hector Berrios	Jeff Mullins	Red Baron's Barn & Rancho Temescal	1 mile	1:35.74	$201,000	II	
2022	Leggs Galore	5	Ricardo Gonzalez	Philip D'Amato	William J. Sims	1 mile	1:34.29	$200,000	II	
2021	Charmaine's Mia	4	Flavien Prat	Philip D'Amato	Agave Racing Stable & Rockin Robin Racing Stables	1 mile	1:33.93	$202,000	II	
2020	Keeper Ofthe Stars	4	Abel Cedillo	Jonathan Wong	Tommy Town Thoroughbreds	1 mile	1:34.15	$202,000	II	
2019	Vasilika	5	Flavien Prat	Jerry Hollendorfer	All Schlaich Stables, Jerry Hollendorfer, Gatto Racing & G. Todaro	1 mile	1:33.35	$201,404	II	
2018	Fault	4	Geovanni Franco	Philip D'Amato	Agave Racing Stable & Little Red Feather Racing	1 mile	1:33.49	$201,380	II	
2017	Wild At Heart	5	Flavien Prat	Richard E. Mandella	Ramona S. Bass	1 mile	1:36.48	$200,000	III	
2016	Paulina's Love	4	Gary L. Stevens	Richard Baltas	KM Racing Enterprise & Head of Plains Partners	1 mile	1:36.06	$202,070	II	
2015	Diversy Harbor	4	Gary L. Stevens	Thomas F. Proctor	Glen Hill Farm	1 mile	1:34.33	$200,250	II	
2014	Pontchatrain	4	Gary L. Stevens	Thomas F. Proctor	Glen Hill Farm	1 mile	1:33.33	$200,000	II	
2013	Mizdirection	5	Mike E. Smith	Mike Puype	Jungle Racing, W. Strauss, J. Grohs, B. Beljak, KMN Racing et al.	1 mile	1:33.50	$150,000	II	
Buena Vista Handicap
2012	City to City	5	Corey Nakatani	Jerry Hollendorfer	William DeBurgh, Mark Dedomenico & Jerry Hollendorfer	1 mile	1:34.19	$150,000	II	
2011	Cozi Rosie	4	Mike E. Smith	John W. Sadler	Jerry & Ann Moss	1 mile	1:35.94	$150,000	II	
2010	Tuscan Evening (IRE)	5	Rafael Bejarano	Jerry Hollendorfer	William de Burgh	1 mile	1:33.47	$150,000	II	
2009	Jibboom	5	Garrett K. Gomez	Robert J. Frankel	Juddmonte Farms	1 mile	1:38.68	$150,000	II	
2008	Costume (GB)	4	Garrett K. Gomez	Robert J. Frankel	Juddmonte Farms	1 mile	1:34.57	$150,000	II	
2007	Conveyor's Angel	5	Saul Arias	Christopher S. Paasch	Charles Cono	1 mile	1:35.77	$150,000	II	
2006	Silver Cup (IRE)	4	Victor Espinoza	Patrick L. Biancone	Martin S. Schwartz	1 mile	1:34.92	$150,000	II	
2005	Uraib (IRE)	5	Jon Court	Sanford Shulman	Ronald L. Charles & Clear Valley Stables	1 mile	1:33.72	$150,000	III	
2004	Fun House	5	Gary L. Stevens	Ron McAnally	Winchell Thoroughbreds	1 mile	1:36.13	$150,000	II	
2003	Final Destination (NZ)	5	Victor Espinoza	Robert J. Frankel	Edmund A. Gann	1 mile	1:35.99	$150,000	II	
2002	Blue Moon (FR)	5	Brice Blanc	Ronald W. Ellis	B. Wayne Hughes	1 mile	1:35.54	$150,000	II	
2001	Rare Charmer	6	Laffit Pincay Jr.	Craig Dollase	Nick Cafarchia	1 mile	1:36.67	$150,000	II	
2000	Lexa (FR)	6	Brice Blanc	Ronald W. Ellis	B. Wayne Hughes	1 mile	1:36.17	$162,150	II	
1999	Tuzla (FR)	5	Corey Nakatani	Julio C. Canani	David S. Milch	1 mile	1:35.79	$150,000	II	
1998	Dance Parade	4	Kent J. Desormeaux	Neil D. Drysdale	Prince Fahd bin Salman	1 mile	1:36.83	$169,200	II	
1997	Media Nox (GB)	4	Corey Nakatani	Robert J. Frankel	Juddmonte Farms	1 mile	1:33.48	$135,250	II	
1996	Matiara	4	Gary L. Stevens	Richard E. Mandella	Alec Head	1 mile	1:35.74	$131,800	II	
1995	Lyin to the Moon	6	Kent J. Desormeaux	Richard E. Mandella	Edward Allred & Randall D. Hubbard	1 mile	1:36.77	$106,700	II	
1994	† Skimble	5	Corey Nakatani	Robert J. Frankel	Juddmonte Farms	1 mile	1:34.85	$111,300	III	
1993	Marble Maiden (GB)	4	Kent J. Desormeaux	Gary F. Jones	Darley Racing	1 mile	1:36.23	$110,000	III	
1992	Gold Fleece	4	Alex O. Solis	John W. Sadler	Joe Alvarez & Lise Ham	1 mile	1:33.48	$85,850	III	Division 1
1992	Appealing Missy	5	Chris McCarron	Ron McAnally	Mr. & Mrs. Jerome Brody	1 mile	1:34.25	$85,850	III	Division 2
1991	Taffeta and Tulle	5	Chris McCarron	Charles E. Whittingham	Mohammed bin Rashid Al Maktoum	1 mile	1:34.30	$112,200	III	
1990	Saros Brig	6	Pat Valenzuela	Dominick Manzi	Green Thumb Farm	1 mile	1:34.20	$113,300	III	
1989	Annoconnor	5	Corey Black	Richard C. Mettee	Morton Fink & Roy Gottlieb	1 mile	1:36.40	$110,800		
1988	Davie's Lamb	4	Fernando Toro	Julio C. Canani	Deals On Stable	1 mile	1:39.00	$105,800		

Legend:
All Weather Track Dirt Turf
Notes:
† In 1994, Lady Blessington (FR) won the race but was disqualified later after a positive swab of scopalamine and placed ninth (last). All prize money was redistributed with first place awarded to Skimble

== See also ==
- List of American and Canadian Graded races
