= Ronald W. Ellis =

American horse trainer

Ron Ellis
Personal information
- Born: March 10, 1960 (age 66) Glendale, California, United States
- Occupation: Trainer

Horse racing career
- Sport: Horse racing
- Career wins: 1,199+ (ongoing)

Major racing wins
- Golden Gate Handicap (Dirt) (2024); Pat O'Brien Handicap (1986, 2016); Triple Bend Stakes (2015); Kona Gold Stakes (2015); Santa Monica Handicap (1995, 1998, 2013); Triple Bend Handicap (2013); Milady Handicap (1995, 1996, 1998, 2012); Santa Margarita Invitational Handicap (1996, 2012); Clement L. Hirsch Stakes (2012); Del Mar Handicap (2012); Santa Maria Handicap (1998, 2011); La Brea Stakes (1995, 1997, 2011); San Simeon Handicap (2002, 2009, 2010); Californian Stakes (2007, 2010); Precisionist Stakes (2010); Affirmed Handicap (2010); Hollywood Gold Cup (2009); Blue Norther Stakes (2008); Palos Verdes Handicap (1980); El Conejo Handicap (1981, 1982); Los Angeles Handicap (1990); Valkyr Handicap (1991); Autumn Days Handicap (1995); Bayakoa Handicap (1995); Apple Blossom Handicap (1996); Go For Wand Handicap (1996); Santa Ana Handicap (1996); Wilshire Handicap (1996, 1998); Del Mar Mile Handicap (1997); Goodwood Stakes (1997); Hawthorne Handicap (1997, 1998); Railbird Stakes (1997); Vanity Invitational Handicap (1997); San Bernardino Handicap (1997); Buena Vista Handicap (2000, 2002); Del Mar Futurity (2004); Hollywood Futurity (2004); Derby Trial Stakes (2005); Indiana Derby (2005); Northern Dancer Stakes (2005); Santa Catalina Stakes (2005); Oaklawn Handicap (2006); All American Stakes (2006)

Significant horses
- Buzzards Bay, Declan's Moon, Exotic Wood, Rail Trip, Twice the Vice

Ronald W. Ellis (born March 10, 1960, in Glendale, California) is an American Thoroughbred horse racing trainer. A November 8, 1997 Los Angeles Times article noted that he "is known for taking his time with horses and taking special care with those prone to injury."

Ron Ellis only saw his first live Thoroughbred horse race at age sixteen but was immediately "hooked" on the sport. Four years later he was training horses and earned his first win with To B. Or Not who won the 1980 Carlsbad Stakes at Del Mar Racetrack and then captured that year's Palos Verdes Handicap plus back-to-back wins in the 1981-1982 El Conejo Handicap. A difficult horse to handle, To B. Or Not set two track records in three years of racing for Ellis who went on to train for prominent owners such as Pam and Martin Wygod, B. Wayne Hughes, and the Mace Siegel family's Jay Em Ess Stable.

In 2004, Ellis trained Declan's Moon to an undefeated season and American Champion Two-Year-Old Colt honors. In 2009, he won the most important race of his career when Rail Trip captured the Grade I Hollywood Gold Cup.

Ron Ellis serves on the board of directors of the Thoroughbred Owners of California (TOC). He and wife Amy, with whom he has three daughters, make their home in Arcadia, California, near Santa Anita Park. Amy McGee Ellis is the sister of trainer Paul McGee.

He was once an analyst for Fox Sports from 1998 to 2001. He has been with TVG Network since 2006.
