= Golden Gate Derby =

Horse race held in San Francisco, CA

The Golden Gate Derby was an American Thoroughbred horse race run early each year at Golden Gate Fields set at a distance of one and one sixteenth of a mile. The Derby was open to three-year-olds.

The Race was run in 1948, 1952, and from 1993 to 2005.

== Winners of the Golden Gate Derby thru 2005 ==
| Year | Winner | Jockey | Trainer | Owner | Time |
| 2005 | Buzzards Bay | Mark Guidry | Jeff Mullins | Fog City Stable | 1:43.69 |
| 2004 | Skipaslew | Eric Saint-Martin | Doug O'Neill | Merv Griffin | 1:41.84 |
| 2003 | Standard Setter | Roberto Gonzalez | Jeffrey L. Bonde | Philip Lebherz & Richard Meister | 1:43.76 |
| 2002 | Danthebluegrassman | Joseph Steiner | Bob Baffert | Michael E. Pegram | 1:43.87 |
| 2001 | Hoovergetthekeys | Ron Warren Jr. | Brian Koriner | Carl Odegaard | 1:42.88 |

== Earlier winners ==
- 2000 - New Advantage
- 1999 - Epic Honor
- 1998 - Clover Hunter
- 1997 - Pacificbounty
- 1996 - Halo Sunshine
- 1995 - Jumron
- 1994 - Bai Brun
- 1993 - Charging North
- 1952 - Marcador
- 1948 - Henpecker
