= Roy H =

American-bred Thoroughbred racehorse (2012–2026)

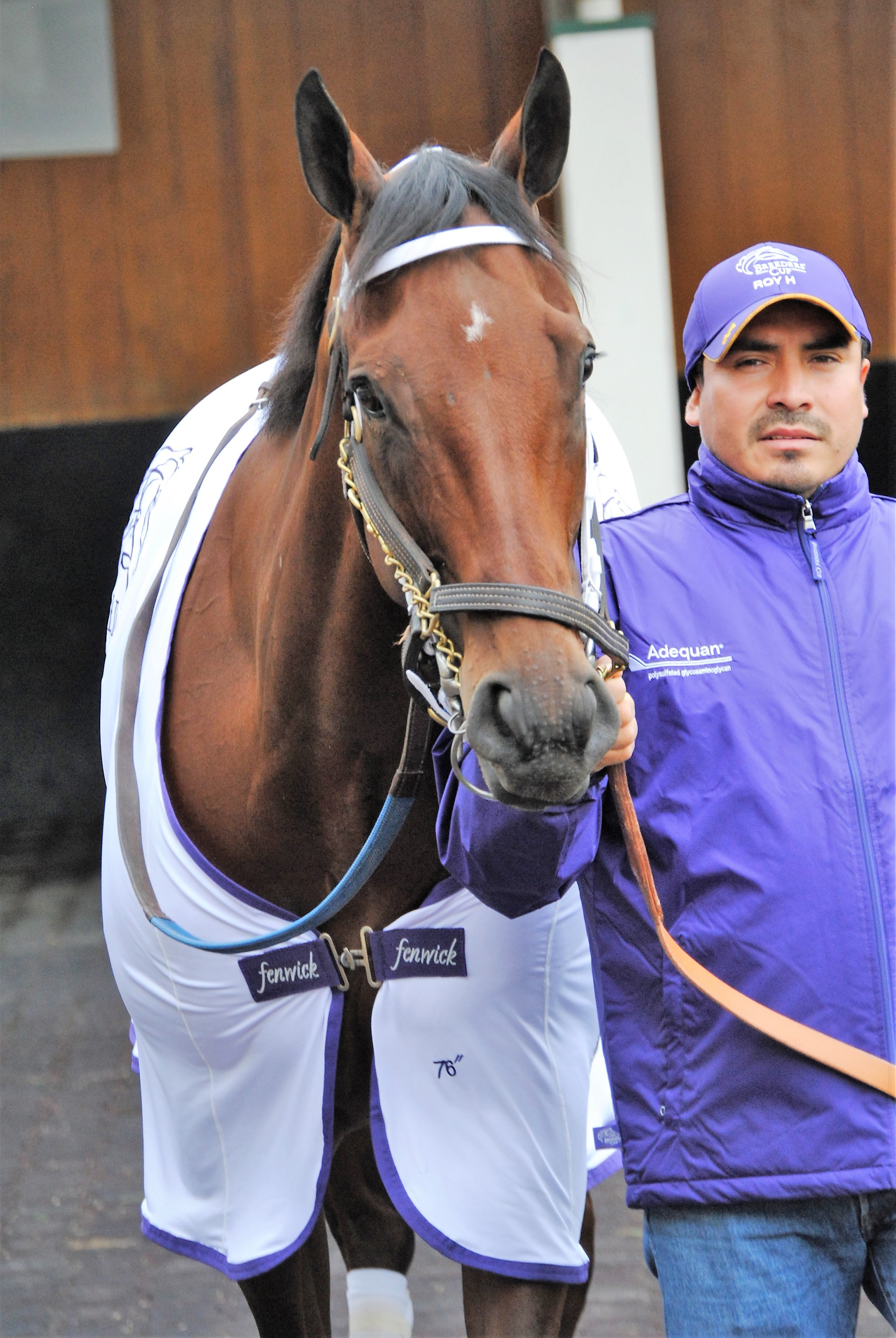
- Roy H at the 2018 Breeders' Cup
- Sire: More Than Ready
- Grandsire: Southern Halo
- Dam: Elusive Diva
- Damsire: Elusive Quality
- Sex: Gelding
- Foaled: April 22, 2012
- Died: October 2, 2026 (aged 14); Lexington, Kentucky, U.S.
- Country: United States
- Colour: Bay
- Breeder: Ramona S. Bass, LLC
- Owner: Rockingham Ranch & David A. Bernsen
- Trainer: Peter Miller
- Record: 23: 10-5-2
- Earnings: $3,139,765

Major wins
- True North Stakes (2017); Santa Anita Sprint Championship (2017, 2018); Palos Verdes Stakes (2018, 2019) Breeders' Cup wins: Breeders' Cup Sprint (2017, 2018)

Awards
- American Champion Sprint Horse (2017, 2018)
- Last updated on July 3, 2019

Roy H (April 22, 2012 – October 2, 2026) was an American-bred Thoroughbred racehorse who was the two-time winner of the Breeders' Cup Sprint. He was named the American Champion Sprint Horse of 2017 and 2018. Roy H did not start racing until age three, when he won only one race, and he was winless at age four. In 2017 at age five however, he developed into the best sprinter in North America by winning the True North Stakes, Santa Anita Sprint Championship and Breeders' Cup Sprint. In 2018, he defended his wins in the Breeders' Cup Sprint and Santa Anita Sprint Championship, plus finished second in the Bing Crosby Stakes and third in the Dubai Golden Shaheen.

== Background ==
Roy H was a bay gelding who was bred in Kentucky by Ramona S. Bass, LLC. His sire is More Than Ready, who won the King's Bishop Stakes and finished fourth in the Kentucky Derby. As a sire, More Than Ready achieved most of his early success when shuttling to Australia but has had growing success in North America as well. His offspring have proven themselves at a wide variety of distances, on both turf and dirt surfaces. Roy H was out of the stakes-winning mare Elusive Diva, by Elusive Quality.

He was sold for $115,000 at the Keeneland September Yearling sales, and then resold as a two-year-old-in-training for $310,000 at the Keeneland April sales. He was owned by Gary Hartunian's Rockingham Ranch and David Bernsen, and was trained by Peter Miller. He was named for Hartunian's grandfather.

Prior to Roy H's retirement in June 2020, it was reported that David Bernsen had sold his interest in the horse after a falling out with trainer Peter Miller. Miller then acquired an ownership interest in the horse.

== Racing career ==
Roy H did not win his first stakes race until age five, a fact Miller blamed on "a lot of little things" rather than lack of ability. He made his debut as a three-year-old on April 30, 2015, at Santa Anita Park in a maiden special weight race, finishing second. He won next time out on May 31 over Santa Anita's downhill turf course, winning at a distance of about 6 1/2 furlongs in front-running fashion. However, he then went winless in his next nine starts, from June 2015 to July 2016. During this period, Miller tried Roy H on both turf and dirt, at distances from five furlongs to a mile.

=== 2017: five-year-old season ===
Roy H then received an extended layoff, during which time he was gelded. Roy H returned to racing on April 8, 2017, in an allowance optional claiming race at Santa Anita. Back on the downhill turf course, he raced four-wide around the turn and then kicked clear in the stretch to win by 2 1/2 lengths. He made his next start on May 6 in a race that was switched from turf to dirt due to rain. Over the wet-fast main track, Roy H "freaked", unleashing a powerful finishing burst to win by 7 1/4 lengths while earning a Beyer Speed Figure of 106.

For his next start, Miller decided to ship the gelding to Belmont Park in New York for the True North Stakes, run over the dirt at a distance of six furlongs. Roy H faced two top sprinters, Stallwalkin' Dude and Whitmore, and went off at odds of 6-1. He raced in mid-pack for the first quarter of a mile, then started his move five-wide around the turn. He pulled away at the head of the stretch, then withstood a late run from Stallwalkin' Dude for a 2 1/2-length win. His time of 1:08.59 earned him a Beyer Speed Figure of 111, one of the best ratings for a sprinter in 2017.

He then returned to California for the Bing Crosby Stakes at Del Mar on July 29. He went off as the 8-5 favorite in a nine-horse field that included the 2016 champion sprinter Drefong (Breeders' Cup Sprint) and Ransom the Moon (Kona Gold Stakes). Roy H broke well and vied for the early lead with St. Joe Bay. On the other hand, Drefong ducked in at the start and dumped his jockey. Riderless, Drefong caught up with the early leaders down the backstretch but drifted wide around the final turn, forcing Roy H even wider. Ransom the Moon, who was tracking the pace, ran through the gap on the rail and inherited the lead. Roy H tried to close ground but came up short by 1 1/2 lengths. "My horse was running really well and then the loose horse changed everything," said jockey Paco Lopez. "I was trying to work around him, but we just kept getting pushed out. ... What can you do?" Roy H was racing for the Rockingham Ranch, and managed by Brian Trump.

On October 9, Roy H made his next start in the Santa Anita Sprint Championship. Ridden for the first time by Hall of Fame jockey Kent Desormeaux, he was the odds-on favorite in a field of six. He tracked the early pace set by American Anthem and Mr. Hinx, moving easily while racing three-wide around the turn. In mid-stretch, Desormeaux hit him once with the whip and Roy H responded by pulling away for a one-length victory. "He's fast," said Desormeaux. "He probably broke a half a length behind the leaders and I had him in absolute reserve all the way."

The field for the Breeders' Cup Sprint, held on November 4 at Del Mar, featured the top sprinters from across North America. Drefong was the favorite based on his win in the Forego Stakes in August and his excellent workouts. Other top contenders included Imperial Hint (five straight wins including the Smile Sprint), Takaful (Vosburgh) and Mind Your Biscuits (Dubai Golden Shaheen and Belmont Sprint Championship). Imperial Hint broke quickly from the outside post and vied for the early lead with Takaful, who ran the opening quarter in a swift :21.82. Roy H scrambled to get good position then settled just behind them in third. Rounding the turn, Imperial Hint moved to the lead while Roy H swung wide. Roy H started his move as they entered the stretch and steadily pulled away to win by a length.

"I had to jockey for position, fighting for a spot two times in 200 yards," said Desormeaux. "After that, he had the catbird seat. He raced off my fingertips and gave me a lovely ride. Absolutely exploded turning for home."

Roy H earned a Beyer Speed Figure of 111, matching his career best. The Racing Post assigned a rating of 128, tying him world-wide with Harry Angel for the top sprint performance worldwide in 2017.

He was named the American Champion Sprint Horse of 2017 at the Eclipse Award ceremonies in January 2018.

=== 2018: six-year-old season ===
Roy H began his six-year-old campaign in the Palos Verdes Stakes at Santa Anita on February 3, winning easily by 3 1/2 lengths. Miller planned to next start the gelding in the Triple Bend Handicap in March, but ultimately scratched from that race. Instead he travelled to Meydan Racecourse for the Dubai Golden Shaheen on March 31. He broke poorly, costing him about eight lengths. He made up most of that ground as they rounded the turn, then entered into a stretch duel with XY Jet. Both horses were caught near the finish line by Mind Your Biscuits, who had made a late run to win the race for the second time. Roy H finished third, beaten by less than a length.

On returning to America, Roy H was given some time off, then returned in the Bing Crosby Stakes on July 28. His main rival was Ransom the Moon, who had won the race in 2017 after Roy H was interfered with by Drefong. This time, Roy H raced in fourth behind the early leaders then made his move in the stretch. However, he lacked his usual closing kick and finished second to Ransom the Moon. Desormeaux felt that the gelding needed the race after the long layoff and would improve in his next start.

Now ridden by Paco Lopez, Roy H made his next start in the Santa Anita Sprint Championship on October 6. Racing three wide, Roy H settled in third place then moved to the lead as they entered the stretch. He won by 2 3/4 lengths over stablemate Distinctive B, with Ransom the Moon closing late to finish third. Lopez commented that Roy H was "an easy horse to ride" and could be positioned "pretty much anywhere", letting the jockey adjust tactics as the race developed.

He entered the 2018 Breeders' Cup Sprint on November 3 at Churchill Downs as the second favorite behind Imperial Hint. Roy H broke poorly and bumped into the starting gate but soon recovered his stride and took the lead while racing four wide around the turn. He continued to draw away down the stretch, winning by 3 1/4 lengths over Whitmore, with Imperial Hint finishing third. "He charged today," said Lopez. "That horse won today with no problem. He knows what's going on today. He dances. He's very happy today."

After the race, Miller laughed at the pre-race commentary regarding Imperial Hint, who had won several major races on the East Coast including the Vosburgh Stakes "Well, the East Coast horses get the hype, and the West Coast horses get the money," he said. "You guys can hype all you want our here. We'll take the money with us."

Roy H was named the American Champion Sprint Horse of 2018 at the Eclipse Award ceremonies in January 2019.

=== 2019: seven-year-old season ===
Roy H started his seven-year-old campaign on January 19, 2019, in the Palos Verdes Stakes, going off as the 1-5 favorite in what would be his final race. He ran to his odds, drawing off under a hand ride to win by four lengths. He was next scheduled to run in the Dubai Golden Shaheen but was withdrawn after an abscess was discovered on his left front hoof. Although Roy H missed months of training due to the issue, Miller still held out hope of making it back to the Breeders' Cup in November. "He has to breeze every six or seven days and not have any hiccups," Miller said on September 20, in advance of a scheduled workout.

== Retirement and death ==
Roy H never ran in the 2019 Breeders' Cup Sprint due to continuing foot ailments. On June 19, 2020, it was reported that Roy H was training to return to racing as an eight-year-old, with Miller saying that he was doing really well. One week later, however, Miller announced that Roy H would be retired from racing.

He was initially kept as a stable pony for Miller. In 2023, Roy H was relocated to the Kentucky Horse Park in Lexington, Kentucky.

Roy H died at the Kentucky Horse Park on October 2, 2026, at the age of 14, following colic complications.

== Pedigree ==
Pedigree of Roy H, bay gelding, 2012
Sire More Than Ready 1997	Southern Halo; 1983	Halo	Hail to Reason
Sire More Than Ready 1997	Southern Halo; 1983	Halo	Cosmah
Sire More Than Ready 1997	Southern Halo; 1983	Northern Sea	Northern Dancer
Sire More Than Ready 1997	Southern Halo; 1983	Northern Sea	Sea Saga
Sire More Than Ready 1997	Woodman's Girl; 1990	Woodman	Mr. Prospector
Sire More Than Ready 1997	Woodman's Girl; 1990	Woodman	Playmate
Sire More Than Ready 1997	Woodman's Girl; 1990	Becky be Good	Naskra
Sire More Than Ready 1997	Woodman's Girl; 1990	Becky be Good	Good Landing
Dam Elusive Diva 2001	Elusive Quality; 1993	Gone West	Mr. Prospector
Dam Elusive Diva 2001	Elusive Quality; 1993	Gone West	Secrettame
Dam Elusive Diva 2001	Elusive Quality; 1993	Touch of Greatness	Hero's Honor
Dam Elusive Diva 2001	Elusive Quality; 1993	Touch of Greatness	Ivory Wand
Dam Elusive Diva 2001	Taj Aire; 1991	Taj Alryiyadh	Seattle Slew
Dam Elusive Diva 2001	Taj Aire; 1991	Taj Alryiyadh	*Relifordie
Dam Elusive Diva 2001	Taj Aire; 1991	Whimsical Aire	Messenger of Song
Dam Elusive Diva 2001	Taj Aire; 1991	Whimsical Aire	Silky Steel (family: 25)

Roy H is inbred 4S x 4D to Mr. Prospector, meaning this sire appears in the fourth generation on the sire's and dam's side of the pedigree.
