= Blue Norther Stakes =

- Class: Listed
- Location: Santa Anita Park; Arcadia, California, United States
- Inaugurated: 1997
- Race type: Thoroughbred - Flat racing
- Website: www.santaanita.com

Race information
- Distance: 1 mile (8 furlongs)
- Surface: Turf
- Track: Left-handed
- Qualification: Two-year-old fillies
- Weight: 122 lbs. & allowances
- Purse: $100,000 Added
- Bonuses: Up to $21,000 to California-breds

The Blue Norther Stakes is an American Thoroughbred horse race held annually near the end of December at Santa Anita Park in Arcadia, California. Open to two-year-old fillies, the non-graded stakes is contested on turf over a distance of one mile (8 furlongs).

The race is named for Blue Norther, a top filly in United States racing in 1964.

The 2009 edition was run on New Year's Day, 2010.

== Winners since 2001 ==
| Year | Winner | Jockey | Trainer | Owner | Time |
|---|---|---|---|---|---|
| 2017 | Ippodamia's Girl | Rafael Bejarano | Mike Puype | George & Martha Schwary Racing | 1:35.93 |
| 2016 | Miss Sugars (GB) | Tyler Baze | Jeff Mullins | Red Baron's Barn & Rancho Temescal | 1:36.24 |
| 2015 | Belvoir Bay (GB) | Flavien Prat | Peter Miller | Team Valor & Gary Barber | 1:36.15 |
| 2015 | Lutine Belle | Alex Solis | Jerry Hollendorfer | KMN Racing | 1:35.50 |
| 2014 | Sushi Empire | Corey Nakatani | Eoin Harty | Wounded Warrior Stables | 1:36.22 |
| 2013 | Race not held | | | | |
| 2012 | Sky High Gal | Julien Leparoux | John Sadler | Hronis Racing, LLC | 1:36.22 |
| 2011 | Lady of Shamrock | Garrett Gomez | John Sadler | Hronis Racing LLC | 1:34.24 |
| 2010 | Tales in Excess | Joel Rosario | Jerry Hollendorfer | Awtrey & Dutton Stables | 1:36.23 |
| 2009 | In the Slips | Garrett Gomez | Jeff Mullins | Michael House | 1:36.84 |
| 2008 | Navigator | Victor Espinoza | Ronald W. Ellis | Jay Em Ess Stable | 1:36.38 |
| 2007 | Gorgeous Goose | Jose Valdivia Jr. | Mike Puype | M. A. Denes & M. E. Woelfel | 1:35.95 |
| 2006 | Make Mine Minnie | Garrett Gomez | Jeff Mullins | Gayle Fogelson | 1:35.94 |
| 2005 | Cee's Irish | Tyler Baze | Douglas F. O'Neill | Merv Griffin | 1:38.37 |
| 2004 | Mambo Slew | Mike E. Smith | Patrick Biancone | Frank Manganaro | 1:34.68 |
| 2003 | Major Idea | Victor Espinoza | Neil D. Drysdale | The Thoroughbred Corp. | 1:34.89 |
| 2002 | Megahertz | Alex Solis | Robert J. Frankel | Michael Bello | 1:35.74 |
| 2001 | Smart Timing | Chris McCarron | D. Wayne Lukas | Bob & Beverly Lewis | 1:36.77 |
