= Buzzards Bay (horse) =

American Thoroughbred racehorse

- Sire: Marco Bay
- Grandsire: Copeland
- Dam: Life's Lass
- Damsire: Seneca Jones
- Sex: Stallion
- Foaled: 2002
- Country: United States
- Color: Chestnut
- Breeder: Jay Shaw
- Owner: 1) Fog City Stable; 2) Gary Broad (July 2005)
- Trainer: Rodolfo Garcia; Jeff Mullins; Ronald W. Ellis (July 2005)
- Record: 19: 6-1-4
- Earnings: $1,325,507

Major wins
- Santa Anita Derby (2005); Golden Gate Derby (2005); Oaklawn Handicap (2006); All American Stakes (2006); Californian Stakes (2007)
- Last updated on September 19, 2007

Buzzards Bay (foaled February 17, 2002 in Florida) is an American Thoroughbred racehorse.

== Background ==
Buzzards Bay was a chestnut horse bred in Florida by Jay Shaw. He was sired by Marco Bay, a winner of the Tampa Bay Derby who earned over a quarter of a million dollars during his racing days. Buzzards Bay's dam was Life's Lass, whose sire was Seneca Jones, a son of Alydar. The colt was initially sent into training with trainer Rodolfo Garcia.

== Racing career ==
Buzzards Bay made three starts as a two-year-old at Calder Race Course in Miami Gardens, Florida. In a private transaction in the fall of 2004, trainer Jeff Mullins purchased the colt for Fog City Stable, a partnership of David Shimmon and William Bianco.

Trained by Jeff Mullins in California, the now 3-year old Buzzards Bay won the Golden Gate Derby in January 2005 at Golden Gate Fields then earned the most notable victory of his career in the Santa Anita Derby at Santa Anita Park. He followed this up with a fifth-place finish in the Kentucky Derby and a fourth in the Affirmed Handicap. As part of the liquidation of the Fog City Stable partnership, Buzzards Bay was sold at the Fasig-Tipton sale in July 2005 for $725,000. He was purchased by retired Los Angeles real-estate investor Gary Broad and his training was taken over by Ron Ellis.

In early 2006, the then four-year-old horse returned to the winners circle at Golden Gate Fields with a victory in the All American Stakes. He went on to win the Oaklawn Handicap but in mid season was sidelined by an ankle injury that kept him out of racing for eleven months.

He returned to racing in May 2007 at Hollywood Park where he finished third in the Grade II Mervyn LeRoy Handicap. He then won the Grade II Californian Stakes on June 2 but a sore back forced him to withdraw from his next scheduled start on June 30 in the Hollywood Gold Cup. In his next race on July 21 he finished eighth in the San Diego Handicap. The race would be his last, although he was nominated for the August 2007 Longacres Mile at Emerald Downs in Auburn, Washington.

== Retirement ==
Buzzards Bay was retired in July 2008 with earnings of $1,428,141. He is currently standing stud at Timber Ridge Farm for a fee of $5,000.
