= Brian Trump =

American thoroughbred horse racing owner

Brian Trump is an American thoroughbred horse racing owner. He is the owner of Supreme Racing.

== Early career ==
In 2013, Trump became the racing manager and Director of Operations of Rockingham Ranch, working with owner and father-in-law Gary Hartunian. He managed Eclipse Champion and Breeders' Cup winning horses Roy H and Stormy Liberal, becoming the first manager to manage winning horses in back-to-back Breeders’ Cups and back-to-back Eclipse Champions.

== Supreme Racing ==
In May 2019, Trump founded his own racing stable, Supreme Racing.
