= Chinook Pass (horse) =

American-bred Thoroughbred racehorse

- Sire: Native Born
- Grandsire: Native Dancer
- Dam: Yu Turn
- Damsire: Turn-To
- Sex: Gelding
- Foaled: April 28, 1979
- Died: June 1, 2010 (aged 31 years, 1 month, 5 days)
- Country: United States
- Colour: Dark Bay/Brown
- Breeder: Hi Yu Stables
- Owner: Hi Yu Stables
- Trainer: 1) Bud Klokstad (1981–82); 2) Laurie Anderson (1983)
- Record: 25: 16-4-1
- Earnings: US$ 480,073

Major wins
- Stripling Stakes (1981); Washington Stallion Stakes (1981); Speed Handicap (1982); Governor's Handicap (1982); Meteor Handicap (1982); Palos Verdes Handicap (1982); Sierra Madre Handicap (1983); Potrero Grande Handicap (1983); San Simeon Handicap (1983); Bing Crosby Handicap (1983); Longacres Mile Handicap (1983)

Awards
- Washington State Horse of the Year (1982, 1983); American Champion Sprint Horse (1983)

Honours
- Washington State Horse of the Century (2000); Washington Racing Hall of Fame (2003); Chinook Pass Stakes at Emerald Downs

Chinook Pass (April 28, 1979 – June 1, 2010) was an American Champion thoroughbred racehorse. He was noted for his performances over sprint distances and was voted American Champion Sprint Horse in 1983.

== Background ==
Chinook Pass was named for the stunning mile-high mountain pass that takes motorists to the very foot of Mount Rainier as they travel between Eastern and Western Washington State, US.

Bred and raced by retired Seattle policeman Ed Purvis under his Hi Yu Stables banner, Chinook Pass was out of the mare Yu Turn, a daughter of the important sire Turn-To. His sire was the Vanderbilt-bred Native Born, who was a son of U.S. Racing Hall of Fame inductee Native Dancer out of Sagamore Farm's two-time national champion mare, Next Move.

He was foaled at Dewaine Moore's Rainier Stables near Enumclaw, Washington.

== Racing career ==
Racing at age two, he won three of five starts, including the Washington Stallion Stakes at Longacres Racetrack in track record time. An injury in the Gottstein Futurity kept him out of racing for seven months.

Back on the track at age three, Chinook Pass made thirteen starts, winning eight, finishing second three times and third, once. He became the first three-year-old to win the Washington State Governor's Handicap in twenty-seven years.

At Longacres Racetrack in Renton, Washington, on September 17, 1982, Chinook Pass set a new world record of 0:55 1/5 for five furlongs in winning the Longacres Owners Handicap, which remains the North American dirt record.

Near the end of 1982, he won the Meteor Handicap at Hollywood Park Racetrack in a time of 0:56 for five furlongs on turf which equalled the American record, and capped his three-year-old season with a track record-tying victory in the Palos Verdes Handicap, then the Santa Anita opening day feature, on a hand ride by jockey Laffit Pincay Jr. to finish in 1:07 3/5.

That year, he finished third in Eclipse Award balloting for Sprinter of the Year, and was voted Washington Horse of the Year.

At age four in 1983, Chinook Pass won five of seven starts and won the Eclipse Award as that year's American Champion Sprint Horse, the first by a horse bred in the state of Washington. Following four more stakes wins at Santa Anita Park and an eight length victory in the Bing Crosby Handicap at Del Mar Racetrack, he made a triumphal return to Washington where his six length win in the Longacres Mile equalled the largest margin in the race's history. However, he came out of the race with an injury to a front foreleg. Near the end of the year, he re-injured the leg and, although several attempts were made to bring him back to training, he never raced again.

At the end of the year he was again Washington Horse of the Year.

== Retirement ==
Hall of Fame Jockey Laffit Pincay Jr., who was aboard Chinook Pass for all his Southern California stakes wins and the Longacres Mile, has often stated that, "Chinook Pass is the fastest horse I ever rode and the fastest horse I ever saw."

Ron Charles, former president of Santa Anita Park, stated upon the occasion of the horse's 31st birthday that “Chinook Pass is, by far, the fastest sprinter I have ever seen, (and) on our 75th Anniversary, it is still my belief that he was the fastest sprinter ever to race at Santa Anita.”

In 2000, Chinook Pass was named Washington's Horse of the Century.

In 2008, the 29-year-old Chinook Pass made his final visit to the racetrack, being honored at Emerald Downs on the 25th anniversary of his win in the 1983 Longacres Mile.

Chinook Pass was euthanized on June 1, 2010, due to an emergent heart condition. In very good health up until his final day, he was the oldest living Eclipse Award winner at the time of his death at age 31 years, 1 month and 5 days.
