= Kona Gold =

American-bred Thoroughbred racehorse

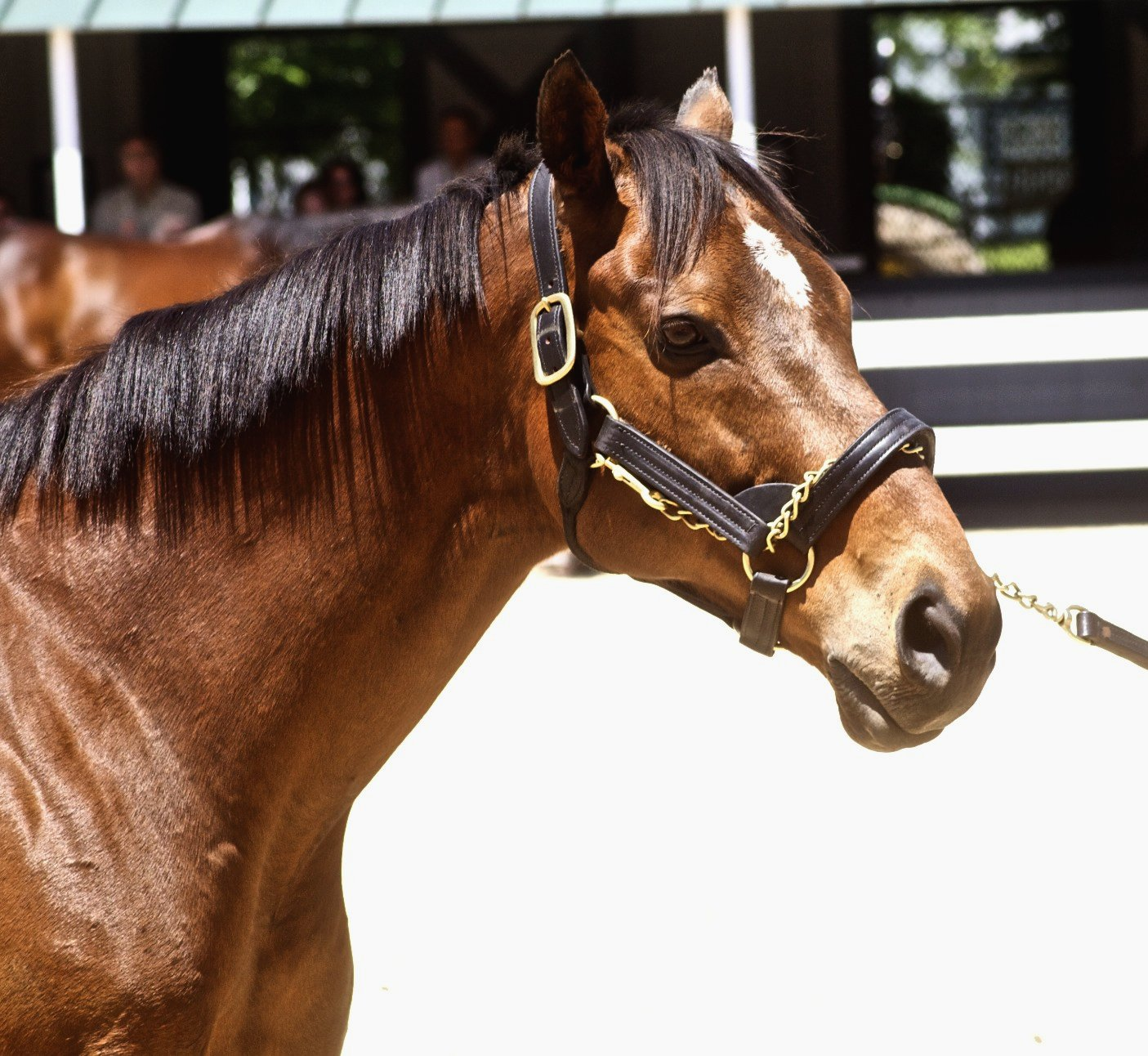
- Kona Gold in 2009 at the Kentucky Horse Park.
- Sire: Java Gold
- Grandsire: Key To The Mint
- Dam: Double Sunrise
- Damsire: Slew o' Gold
- Sex: Gelding
- Foaled: 1994
- Died: 2009
- Country: United States
- Colour: Bay
- Breeder: Carlos Perez
- Owner: Headley, Molasky & High Tech
- Trainer: Bruce Headley
- Record: 30: 14-7-2
- Earnings: $2,293,384

Major wins
- El Conejo Handicap (1999, 2003); San Carlos Handicap (2000); Bing Crosby Breeders' Cup Handicap (2000, 2001); Potrero Grande Breeders' Cup Handicap (2000, 2001); Palos Verdes Handicap (2000); Ancient Title Breeders' Cup Handicap (2000); Los Angeles Handicap (2002) Breeders' Cup wins: Breeders' Cup Sprint (2000)

Awards
- U.S. Champion Sprinter (2000)

Honors
- U.S. Racing Hall of Fame (2026)

Kona Gold (March 19, 1994 – September 25, 2009) was an American Champion Thoroughbred racehorse. He was the U.S. Champion Sprinter of 2000, having won that year's Breeders' Cup Sprint. He was the winner of ten graded stakes races, primarily at Del Mar and Santa Anita, and placed in eight other graded stakes. He was elected into the National Museum of Racing and Hall of Fame in 2026.

Kona Gold was foaled at Carlos Perez's Twilite Farm outside LaGrange, Kentucky. He was sold as a yearling for $35,000 at the 1995 Keeneland September yearling sale to trainer Bruce Headley on behalf of a partnership that included Headley, Irwin and Andrew Molasky, and Michael Singh. Headley trained Kona Gold at his base in southern California, where the horse was brought along very patiently. Kona Gold suffered a few minor physical setbacks, including a knee chip as a three-year-old that kept him from the races until May of his four-year-old season in 1998.

== Early races ==
After a second-place finish in his debut at Hollywood Park Racetrack, Kona Gold won his next three races by a combined 28½ lengths. His first Graded stakes race (the Grade 3 Ancient Title Handicap at Santa Anita in which he finished 5th, beaten 2¼ lengths) was solid enough to earn him a trip to Churchill Downs for the 1998 Breeders' Cup Sprint. In his 6th lifetime start, Kona Gold finished 3rd, losing by two lengths.

== 1999 ==
Kona Gold returned in January 1999, setting a Santa Anita Park track record for 5½ furlongs in the El Conejo Handicap with a time of 1:01 3/5. (The runner-up Big Jag, who chased Kona in vain throughout the stretch, went on to trounce his field in the prestigious Dubai Golden Shaheen that March.) Kona Gold's four additional 1999 starts resulted in four runner-up finishes, never losing by more than 2 lengths. In his '99 finale (the Breeders' Cup Sprint), he made up ground in the stretch but fell short by a half-length to Artax, who set a new Breeders' Cup Sprint stakes record and Gulfstream Park six-furlong track record of 1:07 4/5. Artax also won the Eclipse Award as champion sprinter of 1999.

== 2000 ==
Kona Gold's best year in racing was at age six in 2000. He capped off the year with a victory in the Breeders' Cup Sprint and was subsequently voted the American Champion Sprint Horse.

Kona Gold raced until he was 9 years old. After spending several years as a stable pony for former trainer Bruce Headley, he became a permanent resident of the Kentucky Horse Park in 2008 after the death of John Henry.

== Death ==
Kona Gold was euthanized on September 25, 2009, at the age of 15 after fracturing his left front leg while exercising in his paddock at the Kentucky Horse Park. Surgeons concluded that the injury could not be repaired due to its location.
