= Blue Norther (horse) =

American-bred Thoroughbred racehorse

- Sire: Windy City
- Grandsire: Wyndham
- Dam: Perfect Gem
- Damsire: Royal Gem
- Sex: Filly
- Foaled: 1961
- Country: United States
- Colour: Chestnut
- Breeder: W. P. Little
- Owner: Mrs. William R. Hawn
- Trainer: Wally Dunn
- Record: 17: 10-3-0
- Earnings: $136,397

Major wins
- Junior Miss Stakes (1963); Ashland Stakes (1964); Kentucky Oaks (1964); Santa Anita Oaks (1964)

Honours
- Blue Norther Stakes at Santa Anita Park

Blue Norther (1961–1972) was an American Thoroughbred racehorse.

The Blue Norther Stakes is named for the filly.

== Racing career ==
Along with Tosmah and Miss Cavandish, was a top filly in United States racing in 1964. Ridden by jockey Bill Shoemaker and trained by Wally Dunn, she won all five of her 1964 starts including three major races for fillies of her age group.

== Retirement ==
Retired to broodmare duty after being diagnosed with a chipped sesamoid bone, Blue Norther was bred twice to Bold Ruler and once to Buckpasser but none of the foals went on to successful racing.

Blue Norther died of a twisted intestine at Claiborne Farm on June 9, 1972.

== Legacy ==
The Blue Norther Stakes race, run at Santa Anita each December is named for the filly.
