= Paco Lopez (jockey) =

Mexican-born American jockey (born 1985)

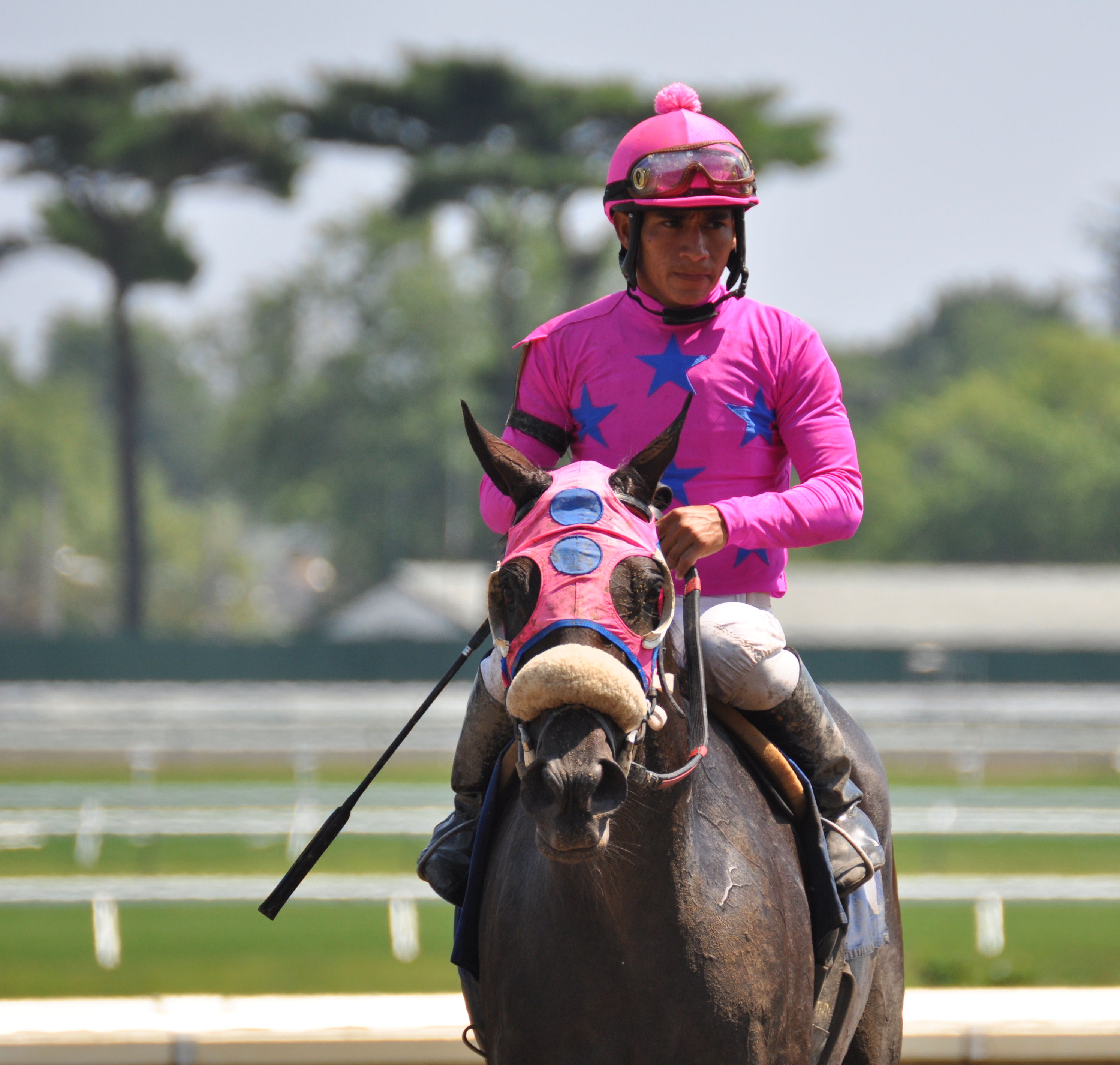
- Lopez at Monmouth Park in 2011

Personal information
- Born: October 18, 1985 (age 40) Veracruz, Mexico
- Occupation: Jockey

Horse racing career
- Sport: Horse racing
- Career wins: 4,338 (as of 9/26/2025)

Major racing wins
- Gulfstream Park Mile Stakes (2009); Alysheba Stakes (2010); Skip Away Stakes (2010); Cliff Hanger Stakes (2011, 2012); Forward Gal Stakes (2011, 2018); Jersey Derby (2011, 2013, 2020); My Charmer Handicap (2011, 2012); Oceanport Stakes (2011, 2012, 2014, 2020, 2025); Philip H. Iselin Stakes (2011, 2020, 2021); Delta Princess Stakes (2012, 2014); Gulfstream Park Sprint Championship (2012); Miss Woodford Stakes (2012); Sapling Stakes (2012, 2014, 2016, 2021); Ack Ack Handicap (2013); Barbaro Stakes (2013); Monmouth Cup (2013, 2017); Monmouth Oaks (2013, 2015, 2016, 2024); Tyro Stakes (2013, 2014); Honorable Miss Handicap (2014); Prioress Stakes (2014); Rampart Stakes (2014); Salvator Mile Handicap (2014); Sunshine Millions Sprint (2014); Woodward Stakes (2014); Eatontown Handicap (2015, 2016, 2019, 2021); Greenwood Cup Stakes (2015); Inside Information Stakes (2015, 2016); Pegasus Stakes (2015, 2022); Comely Stakes (2016); Demoiselle Stakes (2016); Pegasus World Cup Turf (2016); Tempted Stakes (2016); Davona Dale Stakes (2017); Jenny Wiley Stakes (2017); Jim McKay Turf Sprint (2017); Suwannee River Stakes (2017); Ancient Title Stakes (2018); Azeri Stakes (2018); Black-Eyed Susan Stakes (2018); Henry S. Clark Stakes (2018); Ashland Stakes (2019); United Nations Stakes (2019); Hollywood Derby (2019); Indian Summer Stakes (2024); Forego Stakes (2025); Gun Runner Stakes (2025) Breeders' Cup wins: Breeders' Cup Sprint (2018) American Classic wins: Preakness Stakes (2026)

Racing awards
- U.S. Champion Apprentice Jockey (2008)

Significant horses
- Firenze Fire, Itsmyluckyday, Pants on Fire, Roy H, Book'em Danno, Napoleon Solo
- Updated on 2020/02/12

Pascacio "Paco" Lopez (born October 18, 1985) is a Mexican-born American jockey.

== Early life ==
Paco Lopez was born in Veracruz, Mexico. He lived impoverished in his hometown until he left his childhood house in 1997, aged 12, to live with one of his three sisters. While living with his sister, he began to work on a ranch. Lopez's time on this ranch later lead to him learning how to ride quarter horses and, eventually, start his career in horse racing.

== Career highlights ==
Lopez began his horse racing career in Mexico, riding on bush tracks. After racing on unregulated tracks in Mexico for some time, he moved to and began riding in Florida in 2007, becoming known in the United States for his aggressive style of racing. In 2008, Lopez won the Eclipse Award for Outstanding Apprentice Jockey, and in 2014, he won his first Grade 1 race (Graded Stakes Race) on the horse Itsmyluckyday at Saratoga. In 2018 he got his first Breeders' Cup win when he rode Roy H to victory in the Breeders' Cup Sprint.

Aboard Napoleon Solo for trainer Chad Summers, Lopez won the 2026 Preakness Stakes, his first win in a Triple Crown stakes race. Lopez's input was instrumental in Napoleon Solo partaking in the Preakness at all.

=== Suspensions ===
In 2019 Lopez was handed suspensions of 30 and 60 days, respectively, at Gulfstream Park for separate careless riding infractions. Stewards at Parx Casino and Racing issued Lopez a 30-day suspension in September 2023 for not persevering after he reportedly stopped riding his mount in the final stages of the Greenwood Cup Stakes, costing the horse a better placing.

On December 3, 2024, the federal Horseracing Integrity and Safety Authority (HISA) provisionally suspended Lopez indefinitely after a video appeared to show Lopez, who had won a maiden race on 2-year-old National Law after bearing out severely in the stretch, strike National Law's neck with his riding crop. Lopez issued an apology on his X account, stating that his actions were "reactionary, in the heat of the moment." HISA conditionally reinstated him the following month.

On September 23, 2025, Lopez—who at the time was the year's leading jockey in North America by races won and had just wrapped up his seventh consecutive riding title at Monmouth Park—was suspended by HISA for six months for violating the terms of his reinstatement. According to reports, the suspension occurred after Lopez was called for a crop violation during the running of the Forego Stakes at Saratoga Race Course, which he won. His attorney stated that they would "fight this vigorously" and use every available legal option to seek Lopez's reinstatement, while the Jockeys' Guild said that the six-month suspension was "absolutely uncalled for and beyond ludicrous."
