= El Conejo Handicap =

- Class: Discontinued
- Location: Santa Anita Park; Arcadia, California, U.S.
- Inaugurated: 1981
- Race type: Thoroughbred - Flat racing
- Website: www.santaanita.com

Race information
- Distance: 5.5 furlongs
- Surface: Dirt
- Track: left-handed
- Qualification: Four-years-old & up
- Weight: Assigned
- Purse: $100,000

The El Conejo Handicap was an American Thoroughbred horse race held annually on January 1 at Santa Anita Park in Arcadia, California. A Grade III sprint race open to horses age four and older, it is contested on Pro-Ride synthetic dirt over a distance of five and a half furlongs.

In 2000, the El Conejo Handicap was run in January and again in December and in 1984 it was raced in two divisions. There was no race run in 1987.

== Records ==
Speed record:

- 1:01.27 - In Summation (2008)

Most wins:

- 2 - To B. Or Not (1981, 1982)
- 2 - Kona Gold (1999, 2003)
- 2 - Freespool (2000 (2x))
- 2 - In Summation (2008, 2009)

Most wins by a jockey:

- 7 - Chris McCarron (1982, 1985, 1990, 1993, 1995, 2000 (2x)

Most wins by a trainer:

- 2 - Ronald W. Ellis (1981, 1982)
- 2 - Robert J. Frankel (1984, 1998)
- 2 - Bob Baffert (1994, 1997)
- 2 - Bruce Headley (1999, 2003)
- 2 - Ted H. West (2000 (2x))
- 2 - D. Wayne Lukas (2002, 2006)
- 2 - Douglas F. O'Neill (2005, 2007)
- 2 - Christophe Clement (2008, 2009)

Most wins by an owner:

- 2 - Bohm Stables, Inc. (1981, 1982)
- 2 - Irwin & Andrew Molasky et al. (1999, 2003)
- 2 - Desperado Stables, Inc. (2000 (2x))
- 2 - Waterford Stable (2008, 2009

== Winners ==
Year	Winner	Age	Jockey	Trainer	Owner	Time
2010	no race					
2009	In Summation	6	Rafael Bejarano	Christophe Clement	Waterford Stable	1:02.58
2008	In Summation	5	Corey Nakatani	Christophe Clement	Waterford Stable	1:01.27
2007	Harvard Avenue	6	Garrett Gomez	Douglas F. O'Neill	Ron Crockett	1:02.68
2006	With Distinction	5	Javier Santiago	D. Wayne Lukas	Robert & Beverly Lewis Trust	1:02.44
2005	Areyoutalkintome	4	Tyler Baze	Douglas F. O'Neill	Ron Manzani & Russell Sarno	1:02.52
2004	Boston Common	5	Gary Stevens	Jeff Mullins	Richard Englander	1:02.35
2003	Kona Gold	9	Alex Solis	Bruce Headley	Irwin & Andrew Molasky et al.	1:02.63
2002	Snow Ridge	4	Mike E. Smith	D. Wayne Lukas	Overbrook Farm	1:03.05
2000	Freespool	4	Chris McCarron	Ted H. West	Desperado Stables, Inc.	1:02.50
2000	Freespool	4	Chris McCarron	Ted H. West	Desperado Stables, Inc.	1:03.33
1999	Kona Gold	5	Alex Solis	Bruce Headley	Irwin & Andrew Molasky et al.	1:01.74
1998	The Exeter Man	6	Garrett Gomez	Robert J. Frankel	Super Horse Inc. (Lessee)	1:02.23
1997	High Stakes Player	5	Corey Nakatani	Bob Baffert	Michael E. Pegram	1:02.89
1996	Lit de Justice	6	Corey Nakatani	Jenine Sahadi	Evergreen Farm	1:01.85
1995	Phone Roberto	6	Chris McCarron	Darrell Vienna	No Problem Stable et al.	1:02.34
1994	Gundaghia	7	Eddie Delahoussaye	Bob Baffert	John Goodman & Robert Kieckhefer	1:02.01
1993	Fabulous Champ	4	Chris McCarron	Jerry Dutton	Dutton & Lerch	1:02.66
1992	Gray Slewpy	4	Kent Desormeaux	Dan L. Hendricks	Ed Friendly	1:02.01
1991	Black Jack Road	7	Gary Stevens	Fordell Fierce	Donna & Dorothy Kisela	1:05.20
1990	Frost Free	5	Chris McCarron	John W. Sadler	Triple Dot Dash Stable/Vandervoort	1:03.00
1989	Sunny Blossom	4	Fernando Valenzuela	Edwin J. Gregson	M. Bauer/R. Estrin/Santa Barbara Stable	1:04.60
1988	Sylvan Express	5	Eddie Delahoussaye	Jacque Fulton	Mrs. R. A. Johnson	1:03.80
1986	Take My Picture	4	Gary Stevens	Gary Lewis	L. G. or Helen Rhodes	1:03.00
1985	Debonaire Junior	4	Chris McCarron	Noble Threewitt	Jack D. Rogers	1:02.60
1984	Premiership	4	Rafael Meza	Laz Barrera	Ethel D. Jacobs (Lessee)	1:03.40
1984	Night Mover	4	Eddie Delahoussaye	Robert J. Frankel	Ann & Jerry Moss	1:03.20
1983	Pompeii Court	6	Laffit Pincay, Jr.	Laurie Anderson	Crowe & Lewyk	1:02.80
1982	To B. Or Not	6	Chris McCarron	Ronald W. Ellis	Bohm Stables, Inc.	1:02.20
1981	To B. Or Not	5	Pat Valenzuela	Ronald W. Ellis	Bohm Stables, Inc.	1:02.40
