= Santa Anita Sprint Championship =

- Class: Grade II
- Location: Santa Anita Park; Arcadia, California, United States, United States
- Inaugurated: 1983 (as Ancient Title Stakes at Hollywood Park)
- Race type: Thoroughbred - Flat racing
- Website: Santa Anita

Race information
- Distance: 6 furlongs
- Surface: Dirt
- Track: left-handed
- Qualification: Three-year-olds & older
- Weight: Base weights with allowances: 4-year-olds and up: 126 lbs. 3-year-olds: 122 lbs.
- Purse: $200,000 (2020)
- Bonuses: Breeders' Cup "Win and You're In" - Breeders' Cup Sprint

The Santa Anita Sprint Championship is a Grade II American Thoroughbred horse race for horses aged three years old or older over the distance of six furlongs on the dirt scheduled annually in September at Santa Anita Park in Arcadia, California. The event currently carries a purse of $200,000.

== History ==
The race was originally named in honor of the California-bred horse Ancient Title, a two-time California Horse of the Year and a National Museum of Racing and Hall of Fame inductee. The inaugural running of the event was at Hollywood Park as an overnight stakes event for three year olds on 23 December 1983 over a distance of 1 1/16 miles. The following year the distance of the event was shortened to 1 mile. In 1985 the event was moved to the Oak Tree Racing Association meeting at Santa Anita Park as a sprint for horses three-year-olds and older over six furlongs.

In 1990 the event was classified by the American Graded Stakes Committee as Grade III and was upgraded to Grade II status in 1999. In 2001 the event was upgraded to Grade I.

In 2012 the event was renamed to the Santa Anita Sprint Championship.

Between 1990 and 2006, the Breeders' Cup sponsored the event which reflected in the name of the event. The event is part of the Breeders' Cup Challenge series, the winner of the race automatically qualifies for the Breeders' Cup Sprint.

As of 2020 the race was downgraded to Grade II.

== Records ==
Time record:

- 1:07.53 - Cost of Freedom (2008)

Margins:

- 6 1/4 lengths – Straight No Chaser (2024)

Most wins:

- 2 - Roy H (2017, 2018)
- 2 - Dr Schivel (2021, 2023)

Most wins by an owner:

- 2 - J. Paul Reddam (2001, 2004)

Most wins by a jockey:

- 4 - Ed Delahoussaye (1990, 1993, 1996, 2001)
- 4 - Kent J. Desormeaux (1992, 1998, 1999, 2017)
- 4 - Mike E. Smith (2011, 2013, 2019, 2022)

Most wins by a trainer:

- 4 - John W. Sadler (1988, 1991, 1995, 2008)

== Winners ==
Year	Winner	Age	Jockey	Trainer	Owner	Distance	Time	Purse	Grade	Ref
Santa Anita Sprint Championship Stakes
2026	Listenupshance	4	Emisael Jaramillo	Doug O'Neill	Great Friends Stables and Run Fast Racing	6 furlongs	1:08.70	$200,000	II	
2025	Imagination	4	Juan J. Hernandez	Bob Baffert	SF Racing, Starlight Racing, Madaket Stables, Robert E. Masterson, Stonestreet Stables, Dianne Bashor, Determined Stables, Tom J. Ryan, Waves Edge Capital & Catherine Donovan	6 furlongs	1:09.00	$201,500	II	
2024	Straight No Chaser	5	John R. Velazquez	Dan Blacker	MyRacehorse	6 furlongs	1:08.54	$201,000	II	
2023	Dr Schivel	5	Juan J. Hernandez	Mark Glatt	Red Baron's Barn, Rancho Temescal, Reeves Thoroughbred Racing and William Branch	6 furlongs	1:08.49	$202,000	II	
2022	Howbeit	5	Mike E. Smith	Mark Glatt	It Pays to Dream Racing Stable, Saints or Sinners, Danny Haramoto, Sheldon Kawahara & Gregory Yamamoto	6 furlongs	1:10.15	$200,500	II	
2021	Dr Schivel	3	Flavien Prat	Mark Glatt	Red Baron's Barn, Rancho Temescal, Reeves Thoroughbred Racing and William Branch	6 furlongs	1:09.44	$200,500	II	
2020	C Z Rocket	6	Luis Saez	Peter L. Miller	Gary Barber, Tom Kagele, Madaket Stables	6 furlongs	1:09.14	$200,000	II	
2019	Omaha Beach	3	Mike E. Smith	Richard E. Mandella	Fox Hill Farm Inc	6 furlongs	1:08.79	$300,351	I	
2018	Roy H	6	Paco Lopez	Peter L. Miller	Rockingham Ranch & David Bernsen	6 furlongs	1:09.09	$300,000	I	
2017	Roy H	5	Kent J. Desormeaux	Peter L. Miller	Rockingham Ranch & David Bernsen	6 furlongs	1:08.68	$300,345	I	
2016	Lord Nelson	4	Flavien Prat	Bob Baffert	Spendthrift Farm	6 furlongs	1:08.80	$300,000	I	
2015	Wild Dude	5	Rafael Bejarano	Jerry Hollendorfer	Jerry Hollendorfer & Green Smith	6 furlongs	1:09.45	$300,000	I	
2014	Rich Tapestry (IRE)	6	Olivier Doleuze	C. W. Chang	Silas Yang Siu Shun, Wong Tak Wai, Ho Chi Keung & Cheung Yuk Tak	6 furlongs	1:07.59	$300,000	I	
2013	Points Offthebench	4	Mike E. Smith	Tim Yakteen	Donnie Crevier & Charles V. Martin	6 furlongs	1:08.00	$250,500	I	
2012	Coil	4	Martin Garcia	Bob Baffert	Karl Watson, Michael E. Pegram & Paul Weitman	6 furlongs	1:09.89	$250,000	I	
Ancient Title Stakes
2011	Amazombie	5	Mike E. Smith	William Spawr	William Spawr & Thomas C. Sanford	6 furlongs	1:08.24	$250,000	I	
At Hollywood Park – Ancient Title Stakes
2010	Smiling Tiger	3	Russell Baze	Jeffrey L. Bonde	Alan Phillip Klein & Philip Lebherz	6 furlongs	1:09.37	$245,000	I	
At Santa Anita Park – Ancient Title Stakes
2009	Gayego	4	Garrett K. Gomez	Saeed bin Suroor	Godolphin Racing	6 furlongs	1:08.28	$300,000	I	
2008	Cost of Freedom	5	Tyler Baze	John W. Sadler	Gary & Cecil Barber	6 furlongs	1:07.53	$250,000	I	
2007	Idiot Proof	3	David R. Flores	Clifford W. Sise Jr.	Pam & Martin Wygod	6 furlongs	1:07.57	$300,000	I	
2006	Bordonaro	5	Pat Valenzuela	William Spawr	Fred Carrillo & Daniel A. Cassella	6 furlongs	1:07.93	$220,000	I	
2005	Captain Squire	6	Alex O. Solis	Jeff Mullins	Robert D. Bone & Jeffrey S. Diener	6 furlongs	1:08.85	$236,000	I	
Ancient Title Handicap
2004	Pt's Grey Eagle	3	Alex Bisono	Craig Dollase	J. Paul Reddam	6 furlongs	1:08.84	$213,000	I	
2003	Avanzado (ARG)	6	Tyler Baze	Doug F. O'Neill	Cees Stable (Cecilia Straub-Rubens & Michael Cooper)	6 furlongs	1:08.12	$156,625	I	
2002	Kalookan Queen	6	Alex O. Solis	Bruce Headley	Louis A. Asistio	6 furlongs	1:08.26	$207,875	I	
2001	Swept Overboard	4	Eddie Delahoussaye	Craig Dollase	J. Paul Reddam	6 furlongs	1:07.67	$207,100	I	
2000	Kona Gold	6	Alex O. Solis	Bruce Headley	Bruce Headley & Irwin and Andrew Molasky	6 furlongs	1:08.11	$196,498	II	
1999	Lexicon	4	Kent J. Desormeaux	Richard E. Mandella	Jerry & Ann Moss	6 furlongs	1:07.84	$207,500	II	
1998	Gold Land	7	Kent J. Desormeaux	Neil D. Drysdale	Prince Fahd Salman	6 furlongs	1:08.50	$156,700	III	
1997	Elmhurst	7	Corey Nakatani	Jenine Sahadi	Evergreen Farm & Jenine Sahadi	6 furlongs	1:08.82	$155,000	III	
1996	Lakota Brave	7	Eddie Delahoussaye	Bruce Headley	505 Farms, Bruce Headley, Mizrahie, et al	6 furlongs	1:08.16	$149,200	III	
1995	Track Gal	4	Gary L. Stevens	John W. Sadler	William H. Oldknow & Robert W. Phipps	6 furlongs	1:08.32	$99,150	III	
1994	Saratoga Gambler	6	Martin A. Pedroza	William Spawr	Ken Porter	6 furlongs	1:08.87	$107,500	III	
1993	Cardmania	7	Eddie Delahoussaye	Derek Meredith	Jean Couvercelle	6 furlongs	1:08.04	$106,975	III	
1992	Gray Slewpy	4	Kent J. Desormeaux	Dan L. Hendricks	Ed Friendly	6 furlongs	1:08.48	$106,360	III	
1991	Frost Free	6	Chris McCarron	John W. Sadler	Triple Dot Dash Stable & Jim Vandervoort	6 furlongs	1:08.66	$97,775	III	
1990	Corwyn Bay (IRE)	4	Eddie Delahoussaye	Richard E. Mandella	Randall D. Hubbard	6 furlongs	1:08.40	$97,000	III	
1989	Sam Who	4	Laffit Pincay Jr.	Henry M. Moreno	Sam Stevens & Nita Brooks	6 furlongs	1:08.00	$75,000		
1988	Olympic Prospect	4	Laffit Pincay Jr.	John W. Sadler	Gregg Alsdorf, Lawrence Opas & Frank Sinatra	6 furlongs	1:09.00	$95,500		
1987	Zany Tactics	6	Jack L. Kaenel	Blake R. Heap	Vera C. Brunette	6 furlongs	1:09.00	$63,700		
1986	Groovy	3	Jose A. Santos	Jose A. Martin	Theodore V. Kruckel & John A. Ballis	6 furlongs	1:08.20	$85,650		
1985	Temerity Prince	5	Wesley A. Ward	Charles E. Whittingham	J. R. Querbes III (Lessee)	6 furlongs	1:09.20	$64,150		
At Hollywood Park – Ancient Title Stakes
1984	§ Party Leader	3	Chris McCarron	Gary F. Jones	Elmendorf Farm	1 mile	1:35.60	$45,375		3YO only
1983	Video Kid	3	Rafael Meza	Pedro Marti	Burt Bacharach	1 1/16 miles	1:40.80	$45,250		3YO only

Legend:
All Weather Track Dirt
Notes:
§ Ran as an entry

== See also ==
- List of American and Canadian Graded races
