= Jeff Mullins (horse trainer) =

American horse trainer

Personal information
- Born: March 27, 1963 (age 63) Murray, Utah, United States
- Occupation: Trainer

Horse racing career
- Sport: Horse racing
- Career wins: 1,497+ (ongoing)

Major racing wins
- Lazaro Barrera Memorial Stakes (2002); Baldwin Stakes (2003); San Felipe Stakes (2003); Santa Anita Derby (2003, 2004, 2005); El Conejo Handicap (2004); Delaware Handicap (2004); Hawthorne Handicap (2004); San Diego Handicap (2004, 2005); Ancient Title Stakes (2005); California Derby (2005); Del Mar Debutante Stakes (2005); Golden Gate Derby (2005); Palos Verdes Handicap (2005); Blue Norther Stakes (2006, 2009); WinStar Sunland Park Oaks (2006); San Luis Rey Handicap (2008); Santa Ysabel Stakes (2008); Gotham Stakes (2009); Hollywood Oaks (2009); Virginia Derby (2009); Wood Memorial Stakes (2009); La Jolla Handicap (2021)

Significant horses
- Buzzards Bay, I Want Revenge, Castledale, Captain Squire, Carlsbad, Brookes Halo, Buddy Gil, Lustly Latin, Choctaw Nation, Excess Summer, King Robyn, Boston Common

Jeffrey L. Mullins (born March 27, 1963, in Murray, Utah) is an American Thoroughbred racehorse trainer.
