= Peter Miller (horse trainer) =

American Thoroughbred racehorse trainer (born 1966)

Personal information
- Born: October 2, 1966 (age 59) Los Angeles, California
- Occupation: Trainer

Horse racing career
- Sport: Horse racing
- Career wins: 1,498 (ongoing)

Major racing wins
- Nearctic Stakes (2006); Del Mar Debutante Stakes (2007); Speakeasy Stakes (2008, 2016, 2019); CashCall Futurity (2012); Daytona Stakes (2012, 2017, 2018); Santa Ynez Stakes (2012); Swaps Stakes (2013); La Brea Stakes (2013); Hollywood Turf Cup (2014); Woodford Reserve Turf Classic (2015); Pat O'Brien Stakes (2015); Palos Verdes Stakes (2017, 2018); True North Stakes (2017); Santa Anita Sprint Championship (2017, 2018); Hollywood Derby (2019); Madison Stakes (2019); Del Mar Futurity (2019); American Pharoah Stakes (2020) Breeders' Cup wins: Breeders' Cup Sprint (2017, 2018); Breeders' Cup Turf Sprint (2017, 2018, 2019)

Significant horses
- Roy H, Stormy Liberal, Belvoir Bay, Comma to the Top, C Z Rocket
- Updated on November 21, 2021

Peter L. Miller (born October 2, 1966) is an American Thoroughbred racehorse trainer who is best known for back-to-back double wins at the Breeders' Cup in 2017 and 2018. He has won multiple training titles at Del Mar Racetrack and his horses have accumulated over $68 million in career earnings.

== Career ==
Miller was introduced to horse racing by his parents, who owned Winning Ways Stables. He became a groom for Hall of Fame trainer Charlie Whittingham in the 1980s, when his charges included Greinton and Palace Music. He later worked for trainers Mike Mitchell and Don Warren before setting up his own stable.

For many years, Miller ran a relatively small stable with mostly claiming horses. He earned his first win on April 25, 1988, with a claimer named Dynashield. It was not until 2006 that he scored his first graded stakes win, with Fast Parade in the Nearctic Stakes when shipping to Woodbine Racetrack in Toronto. In 2007, he trained his first Grade I winner, Set Play in the Del Mar Debutante Stakes.

Miller's next Grade I winner was Comma to the Top, who won the 2010 CashCall Futurity. Comma to the Top later finished second in the Santa Anita Derby but was nineteenth in the 2011 Kentucky Derby. After winning thirteen races and earning over $1.3 million, Comma to the Top was retired to become Miller's stable pony.

In 2017, Miller attracted national attention with his first win at the Breeders' Cup with Stormy Liberal in the Turf Sprint on November 4. Barely an hour later, he scored a second win with Roy H in the Breeders' Cup Sprint. Roy H, who also won the Grade I Santa Anita Sprint Championship, was subsequently named American Champion Male Sprint Horse.

Because of the effects of the Lilac Fire (see below), Miller's stable had a slow start in 2018 but gradually recovered, winning the Del Mar training title that summer. Both Stormy Liberal and Roy H repeated at the 2018 Breeders' Cup held at Churchill Downs in November, becoming the first two horses trained by the same trainer to repeat. "It's still a little hard to believe," said Miller. "To do something that's never been done, especially in this business, considering the hundreds of thousands of races that are run each year around the world, it's amazing and a real testament not only to the horses but to our whole team."

Miller earned his 1,000th career win on November 16, 2018, with Haydens Havoc in a turf sprint at Del Mar, his home racetrack. "We live in Encinitas, so to win it here, with my family here, is very special," he said. "I want to thank Gary Hartunian and Gary Barber, because the majority of the thousand are owned by those two guys. I couldn't do it without them."

On November 18, 2021, Miller announced that he would be stepping away from training at the end of the Del Mar meeting on November 28. Although the move came after six horses in his care died in the preceding year, Miller said it was purely a personal decision. "I know that there may be some speculation related to this decision; however, I want to make it very clear that it is not a result of any regulatory action, secret agreement, or hidden agenda of any kind," he said.

== 2017 Lilac Fire ==
Miller bases many of his horses at San Luis Rey Downs, a training center a few miles from his home in Encinatas. On the morning of December 7, Miller was at the center and noticed some smoke from the Lilac Fire about 20 miles away. Before leaving, he alerted his staff and van company but there seemed no immediate danger. That evening however, the winds unexpectedly shifted and some of the trees on the perimeter of the property were hit by embers, rapidly igniting. The fire quickly spread across the facility. Road closures prevented most vans from getting into the facility to transport the horses away. Unable to evacuate them in time, his grooms released about 70 of his horses but five died. "We couldn't find a lot of the horses for two to three days and eventually tracked down Richard's Boy in a backyard farm ten miles away, while Conquest Tsunami spent a month in the clinic due to severe burns," said Miller. "These horses are so resilient and the support from the horseracing community worldwide was overwhelming."

During 2018, many survivors from the Lilac Fire successfully returned to racing. Conquest Enforcer won the Daytona Stakes in February and was placed in several other races.

== Personal life ==
Miller has two sons.

Miller was described by Jay Hovdey of the Daily Racing Form as "passionate, combative, and obsessively dedicated to his job". In 2018, Miller earned a suspension after receiving his seventh disorderly conduct violation, related to derogatory comments to a former employee. Miller underwent anger management counselling, admitting he had needed some help. "I'm still an emotional, volatile guy," he said. "But it's a slower burn. I've had to learn control."
