= American Champion Sprint Horse =

American Thoroughbred horse racing award

The American Champion Sprint Horse award is an American Thoroughbred horse racing honor. Created in 1947, in 1971 it became part of the Eclipse Awards program and is awarded annually to the top horse in sprint races (usually those run at a distance of under one mile).

The Daily Racing Form (DRF) began naming an annual sprint champion in 1947. Starting in 1950, the Thoroughbred Racing Associations (TRA) began naming its own champion. The following list provides the name of the horses chosen by these organizations.

The Daily Racing Form, the Thoroughbred Racing Associations, and the National Turf Writers Association all joined forces in 1971 to create the Eclipse Award.

Through 2006, the Sprint Champion was chosen from a horse of either sex. In 2007, a separate category honoring the American Champion Female Sprint Horse became part of the Eclipse Awards program.

From 1960 through 1963 no award was given.

== Honorees ==
Year	Horse	Trainer	Owner
2025	Book'em Danno	Derek S. Ryan	Atlantic Six Racing, LLC
2024	Straight No Chaser	Dan Blacker	MyRacehorse
2023	Elite Power	William I. Mott	Juddmonte
2022	Elite Power	William I. Mott	Juddmonte
2021	Jackie's Warrior	Steven M. Asmussen	J. Kirk & Judy Robison
2020	Whitmore	Ron Moquett	Robert V. LaPenta, Ron Moquett, Head of Plains Partners LLC
2019	Mitole	Steven M. Asmussen	L. William & Corinne Heiligbrodt
2018	Roy H	Peter L. Miller	Rockingham Ranch & Davi Bernsen
2017	Roy H	Peter L. Miller	Rockingham Ranch & Davi Bernsen
2016	Drefong	Bob Baffert	Baoma Corp
2015	Runhappy	Laura Wohlers, Maria Borell	Jim McIngvale
2014	Work All Week	Richard Brueggemann	Midwest Thoroughbreds Inc
2013	Points Offthebench	Tim Yakteen	Donnie Crevier & Charles V. Martin
2012	Trinniberg	Bisnath Parboo	Shivananda Racing
2011	Amazombie	Bill Spawr	Thomas Sanford & Bill Spawr
2010	Big Drama	David Fawkes	Harold Queen
2009	Kodiak Kowboy	Steven M. Asmussen	Vinery Stables & Fox Hill Farm
2008	Benny the Bull	Richard E. Dutrow, Jr.	IEAH Stables et al.
2007	Midnight Lute	Bob Baffert	Michael E. Pegram & Watson & Weitman Performance (Karl Watson, Paul Weitman)
2006	Thor's Echo	Douglas F. O'Neill	Hamdan bin Mohammed Al Maktoum
2005	Lost in the Fog	Greg Gilchrist	Harry J. Aleo
2004	Speightstown	Todd A. Pletcher	Eugene Melnyk
2003	Aldebaran	Robert J. Frankel	Flaxman Holdings
2002	Orientate	D. Wayne Lukas	Robert & Beverly Lewis
2001	Squirtle Squirt	Robert J. Frankel	David J. Lanzman
2000	Kona Gold	Bruce Headley	Bruce Headley, Irwin & Andrew Molasky, High Tech Stable (Michael Singh)
1999	Artax	Louis Albertrani	Paraneck Stable (Ernie Paragallo)
1998	Reraise	Craig Dollase	Barry Fey, Moon Han, Dr. Frank Sinatra & Dr. Larry Opas
1997	Smoke Glacken	Henry L. Carroll	William Roberts, Alexander Karkenny, Robert P. Levy
1996	Lit de Justice	Jenine Sahadi	Evergreen Farm
1995	Not Surprising	Judson Van Worp	Robert E. Van Worp Jr.
1994	Cherokee Run	Frank A. Alexander	Jill E. Robinson
1993	Cardmania	Derek Meredith	Jean Couvercelle
1992	Rubiano	Flint S. Schulhofer	Centennial Farms (Don Little, racing partnership manager)
1991	Housebuster	Warren A. Croll, Jr.	Robert P. Levy
1990	Housebuster	Warren A. Croll, Jr.	Robert P. Levy
1989	Safely Kept	Alan E. Goldberg	Barry Weisbord
1988	Gulch	D. Wayne Lukas	Peter M. Brant
1987	Groovy	Jose A. Martin	Prestonwood Farm (Jack, Art, & J. R. Preston)
1986	Smile	Flint S. Schulhofer	Frances A. Genter
1985	Precisionist	L. Ross Fenstermaker	Fred W. Hooper
1984	Eillo	Budd Lepman	Crown Stable
1983	Chinook Pass	Laurie Anderson	Hi Yu Stables (J. Edward Purvis)
1982	Gold Beauty	William D. Curtis	Georgia E. Hoffman
1981	Guilty Conscience	Sonny Hine	Rosalee Davidson
1980	Plugged Nickle	Thomas J. Kelly	John M. Schiff
1979	Star de Naskra	Richard D. Ferris	Carlyle J. Lancaster
1978	Dr. Patches (tie)	John A. Nerud	Tartan Stable
1978	J.O. Tobin (tie)	Laz Barrera	George A. Pope Jr.
1977	What A Summer	LeRoy Jolley	Diana M. Firestone
1976	My Juliet	Eugene Euster	George Weasel Jr.
1975	Gallant Bob	Joseph D. Marquette	Robert P. Horton
1974	Forego	Sherrill W. Ward	Lazy F Ranch
1973	Shecky Greene	Lou M. Goldfine	Joseph Kellman
1972	Chou Croute	Bob G. Dunham	Emanuel V. Benjamin III & William G. Clark
1971	Ack Ack	Charles E. Whittingham	Buddy Fogelson
1970	Ta Wee	Flint S. Schulhofer	Tartan Stable
1969	Ta Wee	Flint S. Schulhofer	Tartan Stable
1968	Dr. Fager	John A. Nerud	Tartan Stable
1967	Dr. Fager	John A. Nerud	Tartan Stable
1966	Impressive	Edward A. Neloy	Little M Farm
1965	Affectionately	Hirsch Jacobs	Ethel D. Jacobs
1964	Ahoy	J. Bowes Bond	Jaclyn Stable (William S. Paley & Dr. Leon Levy)
1959	Intentionally	Edward I. Kelly, Sr.	Harry Z. Isaacs
1958	Bold Ruler	James E. Fitzsimmons	Wheatley Stable
1957	Decathlon	Rollie T. Shepp	Robert J. Dienst
1956	Decathlon	Rollie T. Shepp	Robert J. Dienst
1955	Berseem	Frank E. Childs	Abe Hirschberg
1954	White Skies	Thomas F. Root, Sr.	William M. Wickham
1953	Tom Fool	John M. Gaver, Sr.	Greentree Stable
1952	Tea-Maker	J. Dallet Byers	F. Ambrose Clark
1951	Sheilas Reward	Eugene Jacobs	Mrs. Louis Lazare
1950	Sheilas Reward	Eugene Jacobs	Mrs. Louis Lazare
1949	Delegate (Tie)	John A. Nerud	Herbert M. Woolf
1949	Royal Governor (Tie)	James E. Ryan	Esther D. du Pont
1948	Coaltown	Horace A. Jones	Calumet Farm
1947	Polynesian	Morris H. Dixon	Gertrude T. Widener
