= Breeders' Cup Sprint top three finishers =

This is a listing of the horses that finished in either first, second, or third place and the number of starters in the Breeders' Cup Sprint, a grade one race run on dirt held on Saturday of the Breeders' Cup World Thoroughbred Championships.

Year	Winner	Second	Third	Starters
2026	T O Elvis	Englishman	Liam Smith	13
2025	Bentornato	Imagination	Dr Venkman	14
2024	Straight No Chaser	Bentornato	Mullikin	11
2023	Elite Power	Gunite	Nakatomi	9
2022	Elite Power	C Z Rocket	Jackie's Warrior	11
2021	Aloha West	Dr.Sichivel	Following Sea	9
2020	Whitmore	C Z Rocket	Firenze Fire	14
2019	Mitole	Shancelot	Whitmore	8
2018	Roy H	Whitmore	Imperial Hint	9
2017	Roy H	Imperial Hint	Mind Your Biscuits	10
2016	Drefong	Mind Your Biscuits (Note: Masochistic finished second but was later disqualified to last for a positive drug test. Mind Your Biscuits was then moved up to second.) †	A. P. Indian	8
2015	Runhappy	Private Zone	Favorite Tale	14
2014	Work All Week	Secret Circle	Private Zone	14
2013	Secret Circle	Laugh Track	Gentleman's Bet	12
2012	Trinniberg	The Lumber Guy	Smiling Tiger	14
2011	Amazombie	Force Freeze	Jackson Bend	8
2010	Big Drama	Hamazing Destiny	Smiling Tiger	12
2009	Dancing In Silks	Crown of Thorns	Cost of Freedom	9
2008	Midnight Lute	Fatal Bullet	Street Boss	8
2007	Midnight Lute	Idiot Proof	Talent Search	10
2006	Thor's Echo	Friendly Island	Nightmare Affair	14
2005	Silver Train	Taste of Paradise	Lion Tamer	11
2004	Speightstown	Kela	My Cousin Matt	13
2003	Cajun Beat	Bluesthestandard	Shake You Down	13
2002	Orientate	Thunderello	Crafty C. T.	13
2001	Squirtle Squirt	Xtra Heat	Caller One	14
2000	Kona Gold	Honest Lady	Bet On Sunshine	14
1999	Artax	Kona Gold	Big Jag	14
1998	Reraise	Grand Slam	Kona Gold	14
1997	Elmhurst	Hesabull	Bet On Sunshine	14
1996	Lit de Justice	Paying Dues	Honour and Glory	13
1995	Desert Stormer	Mr. Greeley	Lit de Justice	13
1994	Cherokee Run	Soviet Problem	Cardmania	14
1993	Cardmania	Meafara	Gilded Time	14
1992	Thirty Slews	Meafara	Rubiano	14
1991	Sheikh Albadou	Pleasant Tap	Robyn Dancer	11
1990	Safely Kept	Dayjur	Black Tie Affair	14
1989	Dancing Spree	Safely Kept	Dispersal	13
1988	Gulch	Play the King	Afleet	13
1987	Very Subtle	Groovy	Exclusive Enough	13
1986	Smile	Pine Tree Lane	Bedside Promise	9
1985	Precisionist	Smile	Mt. Livermore	14
1984	Eillo	Commemorate	Fighting Fit	11

†- 2016- Masochistic finished 2nd but was later Disqualified for a failed drug test
