= Whitmore (horse) =

American racehorse (foaled 2013)

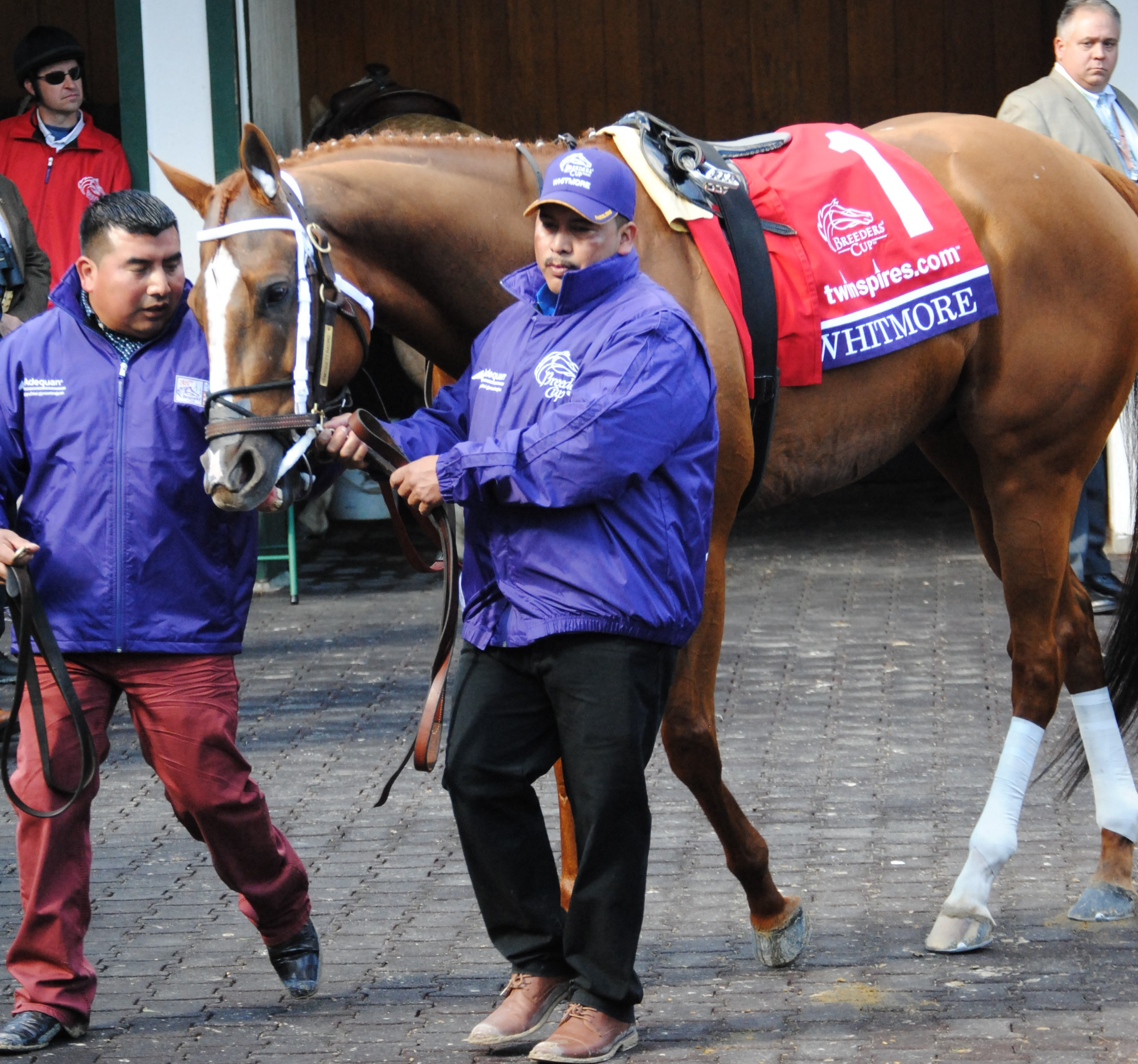
- Whitmore at the 2018 Breeders' Cup
- Sire: Pleasantly Perfect
- Grandsire: Pleasant Colony
- Dam: Melody's Spirit
- Damsire: Scat Daddy
- Sex: Gelding
- Foaled: January 23, 2013
- Country: United States
- Color: Chestnut
- Breeder: John Liviakis
- Owner: Robert V. LaPenta, Ron Moquett, Head of Plains Partners
- Trainer: Ron Moquett
- Record: 43: 15-13-5
- Earnings: $4,502,350

Major wins
- Hot Springs Stakes (2017, 2018, 2019, 2020); Count Fleet Sprint Handicap (2017, 2018, 2020); Maryland Sprint Stakes (2017); Phoenix Stakes (2017); Forego Stakes (2018) Breeders' Cup wins: Breeders' Cup Sprint (2020)

Awards
- American Champion Sprint Horse (2020)

Honors
- Whitmore Stakes at Oaklawn Park (2022–)
- Last updated on 11 February 2021

Whitmore (foaled January 23, 2013) is a retired American Thoroughbred racehorse who won the 2020 Breeders' Cup Sprint and was named the 2020 American Champion Sprinter at age seven. His other major wins included the 2017 Phoenix Stakes and 2018 Forego Stakes. He was also known for his winning record at Oaklawn Park, where he won the Hot Springs Stakes four times in a row and the Count Fleet Sprint Handicap three times. His career earnings were over $4.5 million.

== Background ==
Whitmore is a chestnut gelding who was bred in Kentucky by John Liviakis. He was the first foal out of Melody's Spirit, an unraced daughter of Scat Daddy. Because Melody's Spirit was a very high strung mare, Liviakis bred her to Pleasantly Perfect, a "laid-back" son of Kentucky Derby and Preakness winner Pleasant Colony. Pleasantly Perfect won the Breeders' Cup Classic and Dubai World Cup, but was generally considered a disappointment at stud.

Even as a foal, Whitmore was known for his gritty personality. "[He] was an athletic, cocky guy with a great physique. Dominant in the paddock. He was a tough bugger who would fire at other horses, and they had to geld him before he hurt somebody. He still bucks at the gate before he loads; a real character," said Liviakis.

He was privately purchased for $37,000 by Ron Moquett as a two-year-old in training. He was originally named Pleasant Mel, a play on the names of his sire and dam. However, Moquett soon noticed that "he was neither a Mel or pleasant", so renamed the horse after a high school basketball teammate known for his athleticism. Whitmore was trained by Moquett, who later sold shares of the horse to Robert LaPenta and Head of Plains Partners (Sol Kumin).

== Racing career ==
=== 2015: two-year-old season ===
Whitmore made two starts at age two. On November 6, he made his first start in a six-furlong Maiden Special Weight at Churchill Downs, which he won by 7 1/4 lengths despite veering out in the stretch.

Stepped up in distance for the $1,000,000 Delta Downs Jackpot Stakes, he was in close contention for the first three-quarters but had nothing left in the stretch and finished fifth.

=== 2016: three-year-old season ===
Whitmore won his first start as a three-year-old, an allowance race at Oaklawn Park on January 16.

Although Whitmore was ultimately known as a sprinter, his connections decided to try toqualify him for the 2016 Kentucky Derby. Continuing to race at Oaklawn Park, he proved himself competitive at route distances up to 1 1/8 miles. He was second in the Southwest Stakes, second in the Rebel Stakes, and third in the Arkansas Derby, beaten by subsequent Grade 1 winners Cupid and Creator. Whitmore raced in the Kentucky Derby, finishing nineteenth.

He came out of the race with a bone chip on his knee that had to be removed surgically. He was given a long layoff before returning on December 3 in a 6 1/2 furlong allowance race at Aqueduct. He sat close behind the early pace but ran into traffic problems as they neared the head of the stretch. When he found running room, Whitmore took the lead, then held off a late run from Will Did It to win by 1 1/2 lengths.

=== 2017: four-year-old season ===
Whitmore began his four-year-old campaign on January 15 by winning a six-furlong allowance race at Oaklawn Park. He ran a "monster" race, winning by 2 3/4 lengths in track-record time of 1:08.81. He earned his first black-type win on March 11 in the listed Hot Springs Stakes at Oaklawn. The race had drawn a deep field including Grade 2 winner Holy Boss and Grade 3 winners Fish Trappe Road and Ivan Fallunovalot. Despite this, Whitmore went off as the odds-on favorite and won by six lengths despite being checked early.

On April 15, Whitmore went off as the 1-2 favorite in the six-furlong Count Fleet Sprint Handicap at Oaklawn. Chief Cicatriz went to the early lead and ran the opening quarter in 21:26. Whitmore sat well back early and made a strong move in the stretch to win by 3 3/4 lengths. "I think he's still learning this new game (sprinting), but he likes it a lot," said Moquett. "It's easy on him. Someone asked me earlier, 'How did you teach him to sprint?' I said, 'That's not the training feat. The training feat was getting him to be third in the Arkansas Derby and second in the Rebel.' He's always wanted to do this."

On May 20, Whitmore extended his winning streak to five by taking the Maryland Sprint Stakes at Pimlico Race Course, beating Grade 1 winner A.P. Indian by half a length despite carrying topweight of 124 pounds. "He broke good and just sat back comfortably. The second they cleared, he broke away running. He was getting out when dirt was hitting him in the face a little bit, but I had confidence in him. As soon as I asked him, he started running," said jockey Ricardo Santana Jr.

The winning streak was broken in the True North Handicap at Belmont Park on June 9, when Whitmore raced wide around the final turn and finished third behind Roy H. "I've always been happy when he gets a position on the inside of horses. That outside position doesn't work for him. He blew the turn today and that's why he lost the race," said Santana.

Whitmore was expected to enter the Alfred G. Vanderbilt Handicap on July 29 but injured his hoof while traveling to Saratoga Race Course for the race. He was given some time off, then returned in the Frank J. De Francis Memorial Dash Stakes at Laurel Park on September 16. The field scratched down to four entries, with Whitmore going off as the 1-2 favorite. He settled in last place through the early fractions and lacked his normal closing speed, finishing third.

Whitmore returned in the Phoenix Stakes at Keeneland on October 6 with a late run, prevailing by a neck in a photo finish. It was his first Grade II win and earned him an automatic entry into the Breeders' Cup Sprint. In that race, held at Del Mar Racetrack on November 4, Whitmore was repeatedly bumped and was never a factor, finishing eighth behind Roy H.

=== 2018: five-year-old season ===
Whitmore started his five-year old campaign on March 10 with his second win in the Hot Springs Stakes. Then he raced in the Count Fleet Sprint Handicap on April 14. He was still in last place with an eighth of a mile remaining before Santana found racing room. Whitmore then surged to lead by three-quarters of a length and win the race for a second time. "Today, there was a lot of speed, and I wanted to be off of it. When he got in the clear, he became a different horse. He just blew by them," said Santana.

Whitmore was winless in his next three starts but was competitive with the top sprinters on the East Coast. He finished fourth to Limousine Liberal in the Churchill Downs Stakes, second by a neck to Imperial Hint in the True North Stakes, and second by a neck to Limousine Liberal in the Belmont Sprint.

In the Forego Stakes at Saratoga Race Course on August 25, Whitmore faced a field that was led by City of Light and Limousine Liberal. He rated behind the early pace on the rail while City of Light went wide after breaking poorly. Whitmore took the lead turning from home and held off a late charge from City of Light, with Limousine Liberal closing for third. It was Whitmore's first Grade 1 win.

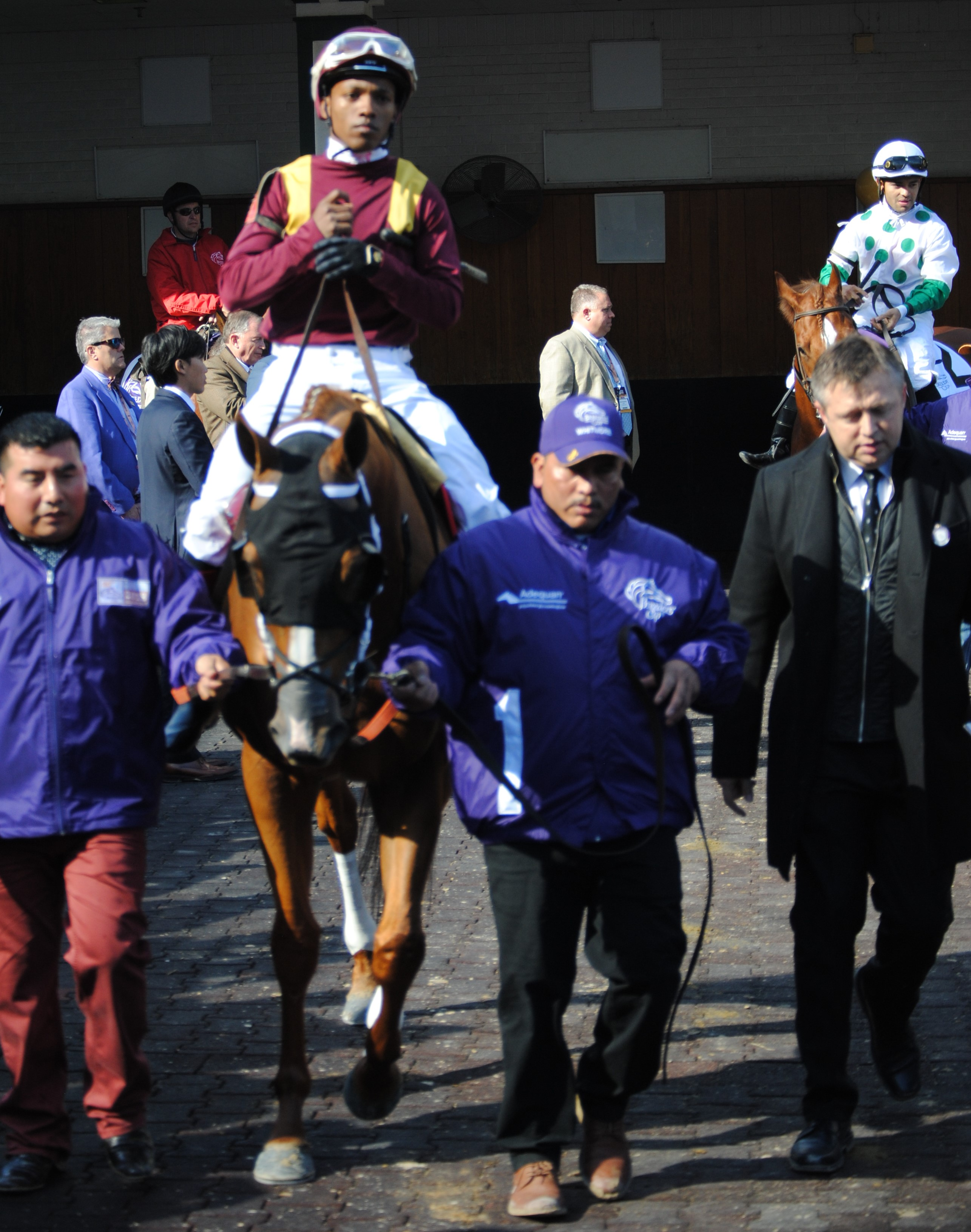
Whitmore with Santana and Moquett at the Breeders' Cup

"We got a perfect trip. We saved all the ground and we got lucky that a hole opened on the turn for home. That's when I let him run and he was feeling good today. Last time we got in a little trouble and today we got a clean trip. Everything was perfect and we'll take the victory," Santana said.

Whitmore's next start was in the Phoenix Stakes on October 5. The favorite was three-year-old Promises Fulfilled, facing older horses for the first time after winning the Amsterdam Stakes and H. Allen Jerkens Stakes at Saratoga Race Course. Promises Fulfilled went to the early lead and set a strong early pace of 22.50 for the quarter and 45.09 for the half. Whitmore stalked in third place, then gradually closed ground down the stretch, coming up a head short at the wire.

Whitmore faced another top-notch field in the 2015 Breeders' Cup Sprint, held on November 3 at Churchill Downs. The betting favorites were Imperial Hint (3-2), Roy H (5-2), Limousine Liberal (5-1), and Promises Fulfilled (9-2). Whitmore was solidly backed as well at 7–1. He broke slowly and settled in last place along the rail behind a very fast pace of 21:35 seconds for the first quarter-mile set by Promises Fulfilled. Roy H bobbled at the start after bumping into his stall, then made up ground while racing four wide and took the lead after half a mile completed in :44.21. Whitmore was still in seventh at this point, 5 3/4 lengths behind. He shifted position several times while trying to get clear from traffic. He closed to finish second but was no match for Roy H, who won by 3 1/4 lengths.

=== 2019: six-year-old season ===
Whitmore began his six-year-old campaign on March 9, winning the Hot Springs Stakes for the third time. Going off as the 3-5 favorite, he was reluctant to load but broke well. He once again rated behind the early leaders, then made his move at the top of the stretch to win by 1 1/2 lengths. Moquett said Whitmore was only about 75% fit for the race. "If he gets tired, it's my fault. But I'm just going to take care of the horse. The gate guys did great. They showed patience and horsemanship. I'm so appreciative that they're willing to work with the horse instead of trying to overpower him," he said.

Whitmore next started in his third Count Fleet Sprint Handicap on April 13, run over a sloppy track. His main rival in the field of five was Mitole, who was coming into the race off a four-race winning streak. Mitole went to the early lead and set strong fractions of :22.49 for the quarter and :45.54 for the half. Whitmore pressed the pace and came alongside Mitole on the turn, but Mitole kicked clear in the stretch to win by 2 3/4 lengths. "Today was their day. The short field, lone speed, that's not Whitmore's deal," said Moquett.

Whitmore was off the board in his next two starts, finishing fifth in the Churchill Downs Stakes on May 4 and eighth in the True North Stakes on June 7.

He was then given a layoff before returning in the Phoenix Stakes on October 4. Promises Fulfilled set the early lead, challenged by Zipp On By. Whitmore stumbled at the start and settled into last place. He was still in eighth place with seven lengths to make up after half a mile, then was put to a sustained drive. He was still in seventh place in mid-stretch but only 1 1/2 lengths behind in a tightly bunched field. At the wire, longshot Engage won by half a length ahead of Whitmore, with longshot Lexitonian a nose back in third.

Whitmore made his next start in the Breeders' Cup Sprint on November 2 at Santa Anita Park. The favorites were Mitole, who had won three Grade 1 races since defeating Whitmore in the Count Fleet Sprint, and Shancelot, who had won the Amsterdam Stakes and H. Allen Jerkens Stakes. Whitmore was largely overlooked at odds of 19–1. Shancelot went to the early lead and ran the opening quarter in :21.47 and the half in :44.04. Mitole tracked the pace in fourth, while Whitmore sat a few lengths further back after a slow start. Mitole moved into second place in mid-stretch and gradually moved by Shancelot to win by 1 1/4 lengths, with Whitmore a further length back in third.

Whitmore made his final start of the year in the Cigar Mile at Aqueduct Racetrack on December 7. He was never a factor and finished seventh behind champion Maximum Security.

=== 2020: seven-year-old season ===
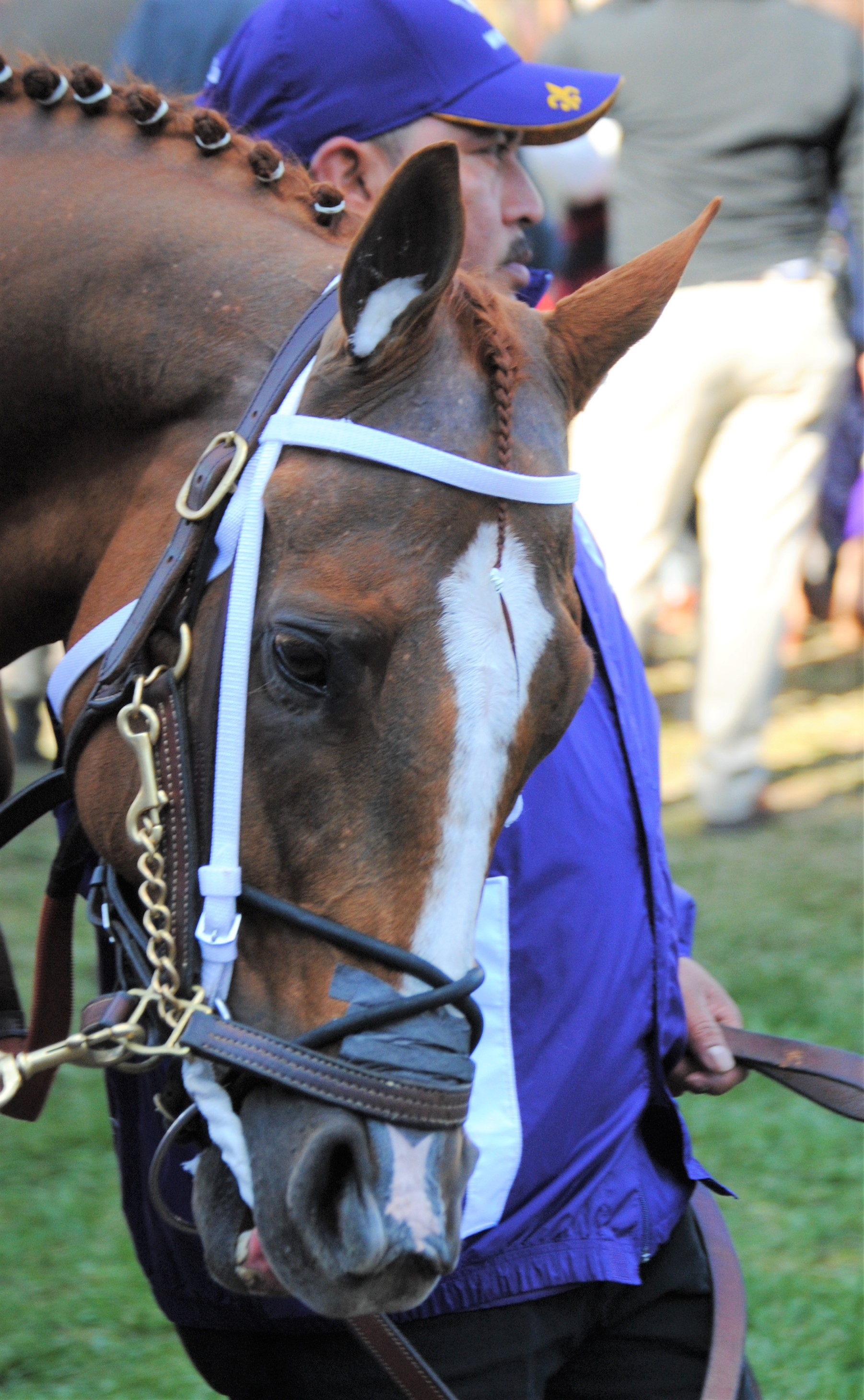
Whitmore

Whitmore made his seven-year-old debut in the King Cotton Stakes on February 9 at Oaklawn Park. Share the Upside went to the early lead and held off Whitmore to win by 1 1/2 lengths.

Whitmore broke his losing streak on March 7 by winning the Hot Springs Stakes by 2 1/2 lengths, becoming the first horse to ever win the same race at Oaklawn four times. He also broke his own track record by running the six furlongs in 1:08.54. Moquett joked that they would keep running in the race until they renamed it after the horse. "It's so good to see him do what he does, knowing how much he loves it. We're so proud of him. If you watch horses train every morning here like I do, you know there are a lot of good horses, and we're just fortunate to have one of them," said Moquett.

Unlike many other racetracks, Oaklawn Park remained open during the early phase of the COVID-19 pandemic, though they did limit attendance to essential personnel. Whitmore raced in his fourth Count Fleet Sprint Handicap, this year held on April 18. The race had attracted a very strong field with several horses shipping in from other states, including recent stakes winner Flagstaff and the highly regarded Hidden Scroll. Whitmore went off as the moderate 3-1 favorite in a field of eleven. Down the backstretch, he raced four-wide in the second pack of a tightly bunched group, then started to gain position at the end of the turn while still racing wide. Entering the stretch, he lost ground to the leaders but then started to close ground steadily to win by three-quarters of a length over Flagstaff. Moquett noted that Whitmore had won despite not being in his favorite position on the rail. "I wanted him to be on the inside, but he broke so well... and Whitmore's always going to argue with whatever you want. He just has that personality. He argues all the time. He has tried to get out. Sometimes, he tries to get in. But, he really just wants to mess with the rider. The jockey just took a hold and let him do what he wanted to do. Then, whenever you ask him, he did what he's supposed to do. It was so awesome," Moquett said.

Whitmore made his next start in the Alfred G. Vanderbilt Handicap at Saratoga Race Course on July 25. The race scratched down to four horses, with odds-on favorite Volatile going gate-to-wire to win by 1 1/4 lengths over Whitmore, who was unable to close much ground after a relatively slow early pace.

In the Forego Stakes on August 29, Whitmore finished eighth behind Win Win Win after trying to overcome a very wide trip, earning one of the lowest speed figures in his career.

He rebounded with a fourth-place finish in the Phoenix Stakes on October 8. Racing just off the rail in seventh during the early running, he swung wide near the head of the stretch and closed steadily but came up short behind Diamond Oops.

Moquett attributed the gelding's longevity to his come-from-behind style, which meant the horse was less tired in the stretch where most injuries occur. "He's just a cool dude. He's very consistent, and I'm expecting good things out of him," said Moquett in the lead-up to the 2020 Breeders' Cup. "We've always got a lot of pressure when Whitmore runs because a lot of people love him and follow him, and we're kind of into that. So we want to put on a good show, and we want it more for Whitmore than we do for anything."

==== Breeders' Cup Sprint ====
The Breeders' Cup Sprint, held on November 7 at Keeneland, attracted a very competitive field, lacking the clear standout of the previous years that were headlined by Roy H and Mitole, both of whom were later named champion sprinter. Vekoma was the morning-line favorite but was scratched due to illness. That left Yaupon (Amsterdam Stakes and Chick Lang Stakes winner) as the 3-2 favorite, with Diamond Oops (Phoenix Stakes winner), C Z Rocket (Pat O'Brien Stakes and Santa Anita Sprint Championship winner and on a five-race winning streak), Firenze Fire (Vosburgh Stakes winner), and the filly Frank's Rockette (Gallant Bloom Handicap winner) also receiving strong support. Whitmore was overlooked at odds of 18-1 in the field of fourteen.

The track was playing very fast and appeared to favor horses with early speed. Moquett later said he was tempted to tell jockey Irad Ortiz Jr. to go for the early lead instead of following Whitmore's normal running style. The jockey compromised by taking Whitmore well back in the early running and cutting over to the rail for a ground-saving trip. Longshot Jasper Prince took the early lead, pressed by Empire of Gold, and ran the first quarter-mile in :21.64 and the half in :44.66. Jasper Prince then fell back and finished last. Empire of Gold took the lead while Whitmore started to make up ground, first on the rail and then angled out in the stretch. Once in the clear, he steadily drew away to win by 3 1/4 lengths over C Z Rocket.

"He had a great trip," said Ortiz. "We wanted to break and have him relax and that's what we did. He relaxed so good. I was able to cut the corner on the turn and when I tipped him out he just exploded. He's a nice horse. He's been running for so many years. He's a warrior."

"I said in the pre-race interview that whenever there are this many track records, it’s almost impossible to think a closer is going to do well. For him to run against the bias the way he did, and the patience of the rider, the willingness to listen, it all worked out. I'm so proud of the horse, proud for the connections. I'm proud for everyone out there that's thinking when you run last in the Kentucky Derby, kick them out – do right by the horse, come back, and you have a shot to reach other dreams. You don’t discard them. You just do right by the horse and it keeps working out," said Moquett.

The Blood-Horse magazine called it one of the most popular wins of the 2020 Breeders' Cup, a nod to Whitmore's strong following among racing fans. Moquett credited the horse's success to his team including assistant trainer Laura Moquett and exercise rider Greta Kuntzweiler. "For a big old grumpy gelding, he has a lot of girls wrapped around his finger," said Moquett. Whitmore was subsequently named the American Champion Sprint Horse of the 2020 Eclipse Awards.

=== 2021: eight-year-old season ===
Whitmore was given a layoff, then had his first workout of 2021 on February 6. However, he then missed two weeks of training when Oaklawn Park was closed down by severe winter weather. Despite being a bit behind in his usual training routine, Whitmore was entered in the Hot Springs Stakes on March 13, trying to extend his streak to five wins in the race and become the all-time leading stakes winner at Oaklawn Park. Going off as the 8-5 favorite, his main rival was C Z Rocket. Both horses broke slowly and settled at the back of the field while racing wide. In sixth place after half a mile, Whitmore made his move as they turned into the stretch, taking the lead with a furlong remaining. From even further back, C Z Rocket started to close ground late and the two horses dueled to the wire with C Z Rocket winning by a neck.

Whitmore's next start was the Count Fleet Sprint Handicap on April 10, where he faced C Z Rocket again, hoping to turn the tables on his rival and win this race for the fourth time. Behind a fast early pace, Whitmore settled in midpack close to the rail while C Z Rocket was further back. C Z Rocket made a wide move on the turn and took the lead in midstretch. Whitmore closed ground late but was defeated by two lengths.

He then raced in the Churchill Downs Stakes on May 1, where he finished third behind the consistent Californian sprinter Flagstaff and longshot Lexitonian. He was given another layoff, then returned in the Alfred G Vanderbilt on July 31. He rated in mid-pack and started to close ground around the turn, but was bumped and faced traffic problems in the stretch. He closed in the final furlong to finish third behind Lexitonian and Special Reserve, who had set the early pace.

Whitmore made what proved to be his final start in the Forego Stakes on August 28. He finished fifth and was vanned off the racetrack in an equine ambulance after suffering a minor injury. Moquett announced that Whitmore walked soundly into his stall but would be retired. He tweeted, "There will be continuous updates for all who are interested (in) his transformation from Ornery racehorse to Ornery RRP project (or professional carrot eater) if that's the path he chooses."

== Honors and recognition ==
Shortly after Whitmore's retirement, Oaklawn Park announced the renaming of the Hot Springs Stakes to the Whitmore Stakes. Additionally, the Count Fleet barn at Oaklawn where Whitmore was based during his racing career was renamed the Whitmore barn.

== Pedigree ==
Pedigree of Whitmore, chestnut gelding, January 23, 2013
Sire Pleasantly Perfect	Pleasant Colony	His Majesty	Ribot
Sire Pleasantly Perfect	Pleasant Colony	His Majesty	Flower Bowl
Sire Pleasantly Perfect	Pleasant Colony	Sun Colony	Sunrise Flight
Sire Pleasantly Perfect	Pleasant Colony	Sun Colony	Colonia
Sire Pleasantly Perfect	Regal State	Affirmed	Exclusive Native
Sire Pleasantly Perfect	Regal State	Affirmed	Won't Tell You
Sire Pleasantly Perfect	Regal State	La Trinite (FR)	Lyphard
Sire Pleasantly Perfect	Regal State	La Trinite (FR)	Promessa (IRE)
Dam Melody's Spirit	Scat Daddy	Johannesburg	Hennessy*
Dam Melody's Spirit	Scat Daddy	Johannesburg	Myth*
Dam Melody's Spirit	Scat Daddy	Love Style	Mr Prospector*
Dam Melody's Spirit	Scat Daddy	Love Style	Likeable Style
Dam Melody's Spirit	Capture the Cat	Tale of the Cat	Storm Cat*
Dam Melody's Spirit	Capture the Cat	Tale of the Cat	Yarn*
Dam Melody's Spirit	Capture the Cat	Ten Flags	Seattle Slew
Dam Melody's Spirit	Capture the Cat	Ten Flags	Nine Flags (family 8-k)

* Whitmore is inbred 6D x 4D x 5D to the stallion Mr Prospector, meaning that he appears sixth generation (via Myth), fourth generation, and fifth generation (via Yarn) on the dam side of his pedigree.

* Whitmore is inbred 5D x 4D to the stallion Storm Cat, meaning that he appears fifth generation (via Hennessy) and fourth generation on the dam side of his pedigree.

* Whitmore is inbred 5D x 4D to the mare Yarn, meaning that she appears fifth generation (via Myth) and fourth generation on the dam side of his pedigree.

== See also ==
- Repeat winners of horse races
