= Gunite (horse) =

American-bred Thoroughbred racehorse

- Sire: Gun Runner
- Grandsire: Candy Ride (ARG)
- Dam: Simple Surprise
- Damsire: Cowboy Cal
- Sex: Colt
- Foaled: February 3, 2019
- Country: United States
- Color: Dark Bay or Brown
- Breeder: Winchell Thoroughbreds
- Owner: Winchell Thoroughbreds
- Trainer: Steven M. Asmussen
- Record: 21: 9 - 8 - 2
- Earnings: US$2,493,009

Major wins
- Hopeful Stakes (2021); Amsterdam Stakes (2022); Forego Stakes (2023)
- Last updated on November 6, 2023

Gunite (foaled February 3, 2019) is a retired American Thoroughbred racehorse who won multiple Grade I events including the Hopeful Stakes as a two-year-old in 2021 and the Forego Stakes at Saratoga Racetrack in 2023.

== Background ==
Gunite is a dark bay or brown colt that was bred in Kentucky by his owner Winchell Thoroughbreds. Gunite is the progeny of Three Chimneys Farm's freshman sire Gun Runner, the 2017 American Horse of the Year and six-time Grade 1 winner, who was trained by Steven M. Asmussen for Winchell Thoroughbreds and Three Chimneys. Gunite is the first foal to race out of the Cowboy Cal stakes winner Simple Surprise, who is out of the Grade 3-placed, stakes-winning sprinter Simplify, a daughter of Pulpit. Simple Surprise has a yearling full sister to Gunite and produced a filly by Copper Bullet in 2021. She was bred back to Tapiture also in 2021.

Simplify is half sister to the five-time stakes winner Classify, and three-quarter sister to the Tapit mare Omnitap, dam of Air Strike, successful in the G3 Triple Bend Stakes, and Pegasus Stakes winner Home Brew. Gunite's third dam, Classic Olympio, was a fast and precocious performer on the West Coast, winning four black-type events, including the Moccasin Stakes and Anoakia Stakes, and she also took second in the G2 Santa Ynez Stakes and third in the G2 Railbird Stakes. The fifth dam, Lilac Hill, took the Cotillion Handicap when it was run at Liberty Bell (now Parx), and was half sister to G1 Gran Premio di Milano scorer Rouge Sang, three-quarter sister to Del Mar Derby winner and sire Speak John, and closely related to Stage Door Johnny, the champion 3-year-old colt of 1968 (both by Prince John, out of granddaughters of the mare Folle Nuit).

== Career highlights ==
As a two-year-old Gunite broke his maiden on his third attempt at Churchill Downs in a Maiden Special Weight event over six furlongs. He followed up with a second in the Grade II Saratoga Special to High Oak. Remaining at Saratoga on Labor Day Gunite captured the Grade I Hopeful Stakes with a commanding 5 3/4 lengths victory over Wit with High Oak finishing fourth.

== Retirement and stud ==
After his final start on November 4, 2023, in the Breeders' Cup Sprint connections of Gunite announced his retirement from racing. In 2024 Gunite will stand at Coolmore America's Ashford Stud for a fee of US$35,000.

== Statistics ==
Date	Distance	Race	Grade / Group	Track	Odds	Field	Finish	Winning Time	Winning (Losing) Margin	Jockey	Ref
2021 – two-year-old season
Apr 29, 2021	5 furlongs	Maiden Special Weight		Churchill Downs	1.80*	9	3	0:59.49	(3 3/4 lengths)	Florent Geroux	
May 22, 2021	5 furlongs	Maiden Special Weight		Churchill Downs	1.50	9	2	0:58.13	(1 1/2 lengths)	Ricardo Santana Jr.	
Jun 26, 2021	6 furlongs	Maiden Special Weight		Churchill Downs	1.00*	12	1	1:10.10	1 1/2 lengths	Ricardo Santana Jr.	
Aug 14, 2021	6 1/2 furlongs	Saratoga Special	II	Saratoga	4.70	10	2	1:16.53	(4 1/4 lengths)	Ricardo Santana Jr.	
Sep 6, 2021	7 furlongs	Hopeful Stakes	I	Saratoga	11.60	11	1	1:23.08	5 3/4 lengths	Ricardo Santana Jr.	
Oct 2, 2021	1 mile	Champagne Stakes	I	Belmont Park	3.40	6	5	1:36.72	(14 1/2 lengths)	Ricardo Santana Jr.	
2022 – three-year-old season
Jun 3, 2022	7 furlongs	Allowance		Churchill Downs	1.60*	5	2	1:20.62	(5 1/4 lengths)	Florent Geroux	
Jul 3, 2022	7 furlongs	Maxfield Overnight Stakes		Churchill Downs	0.90*	6	1	1:23.08	(1/2 length)	Tyler Gaffalione	
Jul 31, 2022	6 1/2 furlongs	Amsterdam Stakes	II	Saratoga	7.40	9	1	1:15.75	neck	Tyler Gaffalione	
Aug 27, 2022	7 furlongs	H. Allen Jerkens Memorial Stakes	I	Saratoga	7.00	8	2	1:21.35	(1 1/4 lengths)	Tyler Gaffalione	
Sep 24, 2022	7 furlongs	Harrods Creek Stakes		Churchill Downs	0.63*	7	1	1:21.95	3 lengths	Tyler Gaffalione	
Oct 22, 2022	7 furlongs	Perryville Stakes	Listed	Keeneland	0.62*	7	1	1:23.22	3 3/4 lengths	Tyler Gaffalione	
Nov 5, 2022	1 mile	Breeders' Cup Dirt Mile	I	Keeneland	3.69	9	4	1:35.33	(4 lengths)	Tyler Gaffalione	
2023 – four-year-old season
Jan 28, 2023	6 furlongs	King Cotton Stakes	Listed	Oaklawn Park	0.70*	6	1	1:08.89	4 lengths	Ricardo Santana Jr.	
Feb 25, 2023	1200 metres	Riyadh Dirt Sprint	III	King Abdulaziz Racetrack (KSA)	N/A (Note: Wagering is not allowed in Saudi Arabia. In British wagering, Gunite started at 3/1 second favorite.)	9	2	1:11.01	(3 1/4 lengths)	Tyler Gaffalione	
Mar 25, 2023	1200 metres	Dubai Golden Shaheen	I	Meydan (UAE)	N/A (Note: Wagering is not allowed in the United Arab Emirates. In British wagering, Gunite odds were 8/1)	14	3	1:10.69	(1/2 length)	Tyler Gaffalione	
Jun 3, 2023	6 furlongs	Aristides Stakes	Listed	Churchill Downs	0.90*	5	1	1:08.46	1 3/4 lengths	Tyler Gaffalione	
Jul 29, 2023	6 furlongs	Alfred G. Vanderbilt Handicap	I	Saratoga	1.20	7	2	1:09.22	head	Tyler Gaffalione	
Aug 26, 2023	7 furlongs	Forego Stakes	I	Saratoga	1.30	5	1	1:21.53	1 3/4 lengths	Tyler Gaffalione	
Sep 23, 2023	1 mile	Parx Dirt Mile Stakes	Listed	Parx	0.30*	6	2	1:38.34	(1 3/4 lengths)	Tyler Gaffalione	
Nov 4, 2023	6 furlongs	Breeders' Cup Sprint	I	Santa Anita	3.10	8	2	1:08.34	(1 1/2 lengths)	Tyler Gaffalione	

Notes:
An (*) asterisk after the odds means Gunite was the post-time favorite.

== Pedigree ==
Pedigree of Gunite, Dark Bay or Brown colt, February 3, 2019
Sire Gun Runner (2013)	Candy Ride (ARG) (1999)	Ride the Rails (1991)	Cryptoclearance (1984)
Sire Gun Runner (2013)	Candy Ride (ARG) (1999)	Ride the Rails (1991)	Herbalesian (1969)
Sire Gun Runner (2013)	Candy Ride (ARG) (1999)	Candy Girl (ARG) (1990)	Candy Stripes (1982)
Sire Gun Runner (2013)	Candy Ride (ARG) (1999)	Candy Girl (ARG) (1990)	City Girl (ARG) (1982)
Sire Gun Runner (2013)	Quiet Giant (2007)	Giant's Causeway (1997)	Storm Cat (1983)
Sire Gun Runner (2013)	Quiet Giant (2007)	Giant's Causeway (1997)	Mariah's Storm (1991)
Sire Gun Runner (2013)	Quiet Giant (2007)	Quiet Dance (1993)	Quiet American (1986)
Sire Gun Runner (2013)	Quiet Giant (2007)	Quiet Dance (1993)	Misty Dancer (1988)
Dam Simple Surprise (2013)	Cowboy Cal (2005)	Giant's Causeway (1997)	Storm Cat (1983)
Dam Simple Surprise (2013)	Cowboy Cal (2005)	Giant's Causeway (1997)	Mariah's Storm (1991)
Dam Simple Surprise (2013)	Cowboy Cal (2005)	Texas Tammy (1998)	Seeking the Gold (1985)
Dam Simple Surprise (2013)	Cowboy Cal (2005)	Texas Tammy (1998)	Hot Novel (1986)
Dam Simple Surprise (2013)	Simplify (2006)	Pulpit (1994)	A.P. Indy (1989)
Dam Simple Surprise (2013)	Simplify (2006)	Pulpit (1994)	Preach (1989)
Dam Simple Surprise (2013)	Simplify (2006)	Classic Olympio (1997)	Olimpio (1988)
Dam Simple Surprise (2013)	Simplify (2006)	Classic Olympio (1997)	Parm Beach Dewey (1990)(family 1-l)

Inbreeding:

- Giant's Causeway: 3S x 3D; Storm Cat: 4S x 4D; Mariah's Storm: 4S x 4D
