= Gunite =

Gunite may refer to:

- Gunite, a variant of Shotcrete sprayed concrete
- Gunite (horse), an American Thoroughbred race horse
