= Churchill Downs Stakes =

Horse race in Louisville, Kentucky, US

- Class: Grade I
- Location: Churchill Downs; Louisville, Kentucky, United States
- Inaugurated: 1911 (as Churchill Downs Handicap)
- Race type: Thoroughbred – Flat racing
- Sponsor: Ford (since 2021)
- Website: www.churchilldowns.com

Race information
- Distance: 7 furlongs
- Surface: Dirt
- Track: left-handed
- Qualification: four-year-olds and older
- Weight: 123lbs with allowances
- Purse: US$1,000,000 (since 2024)

The Churchill Downs Stakes is a Grade I American Thoroughbred horse race for four-year-old and older sprinters run over a distance of seven furlongs on the dirt annually in early May at Churchill Downs racetrack in Louisville, Kentucky, as an undercard event on Kentucky Derby day. The event currently offers a purse of $1,000,000.

== History ==
The inaugural running of the event was the Churchill Downs Handicap took place on the closing day of the Churchill Downs Spring meeting, June 6, 1911, as a three-year-old and over race over a distance of 1 1/8 miles with five starters and was won by Carlton G. in track record time of 1:51 4/5 under jockey George Taplin for owner and trainer Lon Johnson. The following year longshot Any Port equalled the record 1:51 3/5 winning by 1 1/2 lengths. The event was held once more at the 1 1/8 miles distance in 1913 before the track would have the race mothballed until 1938.

In 1938, the event was reinstated at a distance of seven furlongs but was extended to one mile for the 1940 running. Louise Hickman's Arab's Arrow would win the event three years straight including a dead heat victory with Kings Blue in 1939. In 1947 the event was held on opening day of the spring meeting at a shortened distance of seven furlongs. In 1949 the event only attracted four starters of which two were a Calumet Farm entry of Free America and the 1947 American Horse of the Year Armed thus enabling Churchill Downs to hold the event as a non betting Exhibition Race.

The 1951 before a crowd of 18,000 on opening day of the spring meeting the winner of the event was the Detroit based sprinter Johns Joy who broke the seven furlongs time record in 1:22 4/5 which was held by Distinction and stood since 1921.

The distance of the event was decreased to six furlongs for four running held from 1952 to 1955. Soon after return to the now distance of seven furlongs, in 1958 Shac Pan set a new track record of 1:22 flat winning by a head over Ezgo.

The event was held in split divisions twice - 1982 and 1985. In 1983, the conditions of the event were modified from handicap to stakes allowance for four-year-olds and older which reflect in the name of the event.

Since 1986, the event has been scheduled on the same day as the Kentucky Derby. In 1988, the event reverted to a handicap and was held with such conditions until 2006.

In 1992, the event was classified as Grade III. The winner that year, 4/5 odds-on Pleasant Tap would also win the Grade I Jockey Club Gold Cup and the Suburban Handicap and was awarded the U.S. Champion Older Male Horse.

The event was upgraded to Grade II in 1998. That year the winner 7/5 favorite Distorted Humor set a new track of 1:21.18 winning by 3 1/4 lengths over Gold Land. The track record was once again broken in this event in 2001 when Alannan won in a time of 1:20.50. That day on Kentucky Derby Day, three track records were broken.

The 2004 winner, six-year-old Speightstown, went on to win the Breeders’ Cup Sprint and was subsequently recognized as the U.S. Champion Sprinter.

In 2007, the conditions of the event were changed from handicap to stakes allowance and the name of the event was modified to the Churchill Downs Stakes.

The American Graded Stakes Committee upgraded the race to its current Grade I status in 2019. Mitole, the 2019 winner would also win the Grade I Metropolitan Handicap, Forego Stakes and Breeders' Cup Sprint and was crowned the U.S. Champion Sprinter.

== Records ==
Speed record:

- 7 furlongs – 1:20.49 T O Elvis (2026)
- 6 furlongs – 1:10.60 Roaming (1953)
- 1 mile – 1:36.60 My Bill (1941)

Margins:

- 5 lengths – Barbizon Streak (1974), Dreadnought (1981)

Most wins:

- 3 – Arab's Arrow (1938, 1939, 1940)

Most wins by a jockey:

- 5 – Steve Brooks (1947, 1949, 1950, 1952, 1959)

Most wins by a trainer:

- 4 – William I. Mott (1983, 1985, 1999, 2023)

Most wins by an owner:

- 3 – Louise Hickman (1938, 1939, 1940)
- 3 – Dixiana Farm (1950, 1952, 1973)
- 3 – Albert M. Stall Sr. (1980, 1982, 1985)

== Winners ==
Year	Winner	Age	Jockey	Trainer	Owner	Distance	Time	Purse	Grade	Ref
Churchill Downs Stakes
2026	T O Elvis	4	Ryusei Sakai	Daisuke Takayanagi	Tomoya Ozasa	7 furlongs	1:20.49	$939,600	I	
2025	Mindframe	4	Irad Ortiz Jr.	Todd A. Pletcher	Repole Stables & St. Elias Stable	7 furlongs	1:22.64	$935,000	I	
2024	Gun Pilot	4	Cristian Torres	Steven M. Asmussen	Three Chimneys Farm	7 furlongs	1:21.95	$1,000,000	I	
2023	Cody's Wish	5	Junior Alvarado	William I. Mott	Godolphin	7 furlongs	1:21.17	$750,000	I	
2022	Jackie's Warrior	4	Joel Rosario	Steven M. Asmussen	Kirk & Judy Robison	7 furlongs	1:21.95	$500,000	I	
2021	Flagstaff	7	Luis Saez	John W. Sadler	Lane's End Racing & Hronis Racing	7 furlongs	1:21.82	$500,000	I	
2020	Race not held									
2019	Mitole	4	Ricardo Santana Jr.	Steven M. Asmussen	William & Corinne Heiligbrodt	7 furlongs	1:21.21	$500,000	I	
2018	Limousine Liberal	6	Jose L. Ortiz	Ben Colebrook	Katherine G. Ball	7 furlongs	1:22.73	$500,000	II	
2017	Limousine Liberal	5	Jose L. Ortiz	Ben Colebrook	Katherine G. Ball	7 furlongs	1:23.22	$500,000	II	
2016	Catalina Red	4	Javier Castellano	Jorge Navarro	Anthony A. Lenci	7 furlongs	1:20.79	$500,000	II	
2015	Private Zone (CAN)	6	Martin A. Pedroza	Jorge Navarro	Good Friends Stable	7 furlongs	1:22.54	$500,000	II	
2014	Central Banker	4	Corey Nakatani	Albert Stall Jr.	Klaravich Stables & William H. Lawrence	7 furlongs	1:21.15	$464,800	II	
2013	Delaunay	6	Rosie Napravnik	Thomas M. Amoss	Maggi Moss	7 furlongs	1:22.35	$443,600	II	
2012	Shackleford	4	Jesus Lopez Castanon	Dale L. Romans	Michael Lauffer & William D. Cubbedge	7 furlongs	1:21.06	$441,600	II	
2011	Aikenite	4	John R. Velazquez	Todd A. Pletcher	Dogwood Stable	7 furlongs	1:21.40	$348,900	II	
2010	Atta Boy Roy	5	Calvin H. Borel	Valorie Lund	R.E.V. Racing	7 furlongs	1:22.54	$290,000	II	
2009	Accredit	4	Julien R. Leparoux	Michael J. Maker	Kenneth L. and Sarah K. Ramsey	7 furlongs	1:23.24	$280,500	II	
2008	Elite Squadron	4	John R. Velazquez	James E. Baker	Tom R. Walters	7 furlongs	1:21.53	$282,000	II	
2007	Saint Anddan	5	Rafael Bejarano	Robert J. Frankel	Mr. & Mrs. William Warren Jr.	7 furlongs	1:22.31	$277,750	II	
Churchill Downs Handicap
2006	Trickey Trevor	7	Russell Baze	Jerry Hollendorfer	Jerry Hollendorfer, Dan Jelladian & George Todaro	7 furlongs	1:21.68	$229,000	II	
2005	Battle Won	5	Ramon A. Dominguez	Charles Simon	Jay & Gretchen Manoogian	7 furlongs	1:20.56	$231,000	II	
2004	Speightstown	6	John R. Velazquez	Todd A. Pletcher	Eugene & Laura Melnyk	7 furlongs	1:21.38	$221,800	II	
2003	Aldebaran	5	Jerry D. Bailey	Robert J. Frankel	Flaxman Holdings Ltd.	7 furlongs	1:21.80	$233,800	II	
2002	† D'wildcat	4	Kent J. Desormeaux	Robert B. Hess Jr.	Fog City Stable	7 furlongs	1:22.37	$171,450	II	
2001	Alannan	5	Edgar S. Prado	Carl A. Nafzger	Eaglestone Farm	7 furlongs	1:20.50	$179,550	II	
Winnercomm Handicap
2000	Straight Man	4	Jorge F. Chavez	Bob Baffert	Robert & Beverly Lewis	7 furlongs	1:21.53	$169,200	II	
Churchill Downs Handicap
1999	Rock and Roll	4	Pat Day	William I. Mott	Madeleine Paulson & Jenny Craig	7 furlongs	1:22.81	$166,350	II	
1998	Distorted Humor	5	Gary L. Stevens	W. Elliott Walden	Russell L. Reineman & Prestonwood Farms Inc.	7 furlongs	1:21.18	$166,950	II	
1997	Diligence	4	Mike E. Smith	Nicholas P. Zito	Kinsman Stable	7 furlongs	1:22.37	$113,600	III	
1996	Criollito (ARG)	5	Chris McCarron	Bob Baffert	Robert & Beverly Lewis	7 furlongs	1:22.01	$114,800	III	
1995	Goldseeker Bud	4	Willie Martinez	Angel O. Montano Sr.	Falkon Stable	7 furlongs	1:21.75	$115,700	III	
1994	Honor the Hero	6	Garrett K. Gomez	Doug Oliver	Alan Burdick, Arnulf & Rebecca Ueland	7 furlongs	1:23.05	$109,800	III	
1993	Callide Valley	5	Gary L. Stevens	Orin J. Glass Jr.	Gary & Mary West	7 furlongs	1:22.01	$86,250	III	
1992	Pleasant Tap	5	Eddie Delahoussaye	Christopher Speckert	Buckland Farm	7 furlongs	1:22.32	$85,425	III	
1991	Thirty Six Red	4	Jerry D. Bailey	Nicholas P. Zito	B. Giles Brophy	7 furlongs	1:22.15	$57,900		
1990	Beau Genius	5	Ricardo D. Lopez	Gerald S. Bennett	D. Brian Davidson	7 furlongs	1:23.20	$58,200		
1989	Dancing Spree	4	Pat Day	Claude R. McGaughey III	Ogden Phipps	7 furlongs	1:24.00	$58,850		
1988	Conquer	4	Gary L. Stevens	D. Wayne Lukas	Thomas Curnes	7 furlongs	1:23.20	$56,650		
Churchill Downs Stakes
1987	Sovereign's Ace	5	Laffit Pincay Jr.	Bernard S. Flint	Alan Art Stables	7 furlongs	1:22.00	$35,295		
1986	Sovereign's Ace	4	Phil Rubbicco	Bernard S. Flint	Alan Art Stables	7 furlongs	1:22.60	$35,280		
1985	Rapid Gray	4	Pat Day	William I. Mott	William Lucas	7 furlongs	1:24.00	$36,400		Division 1
1985	Bayou Hebert	6	James McKnight	Judith H. Zouck	Albert M. Stall Sr. & Earl Burke	7 furlongs	1:23.40	$35,875		Division 2
1984	Habitonia	4	Pat Day	Larry D. Edwards	Farid Sefa	7 furlongs	1:23.00	$33,225		
1983	Shot n' Missed	6	Leroy Moyers	William I. Mott	William Lucas	7 furlongs	1:23.60	$33,425		
Churchill Downs Handicap
1982	Top Avenger	4	Ronald D. Ardoin	Frank L. Brothers	John Franks	7 furlongs	1:23.00	$33,475		Division 1
1982	Bayou Black	6	Randy Romero	Robert E. Holthus	Albert M. Stall Sr. & Earl Burke	7 furlongs	1:22.80	$35,600		Division 2
1981	Dreadnought	4	Julio C. Espinoza	James A. Padgett	Centurion Stable	7 furlongs	1:23.60	$30,200		
1980	Dr. Riddick	6	Don Brumfield	Frank L. Brothers	Albert M. Stall Sr.	7 furlongs	1:23.20	$27,350		
1979	Trimlea	5	Jorge Velasquez	John M. Veitch	Calumet Farm	7 furlongs	1:24.60	$28,850		
1978	To the Quick	4	Jose Amy	Anthony Basile	Bwamazon Farm	7 furlongs	1:25.00	$22,325		
1977	It's Freezing	5	Eddie Delahoussaye	William R. O'Neill	Bwamazon Farm	7 furlongs	1:23.40	$22,350		
1976	Yamanin	4	Garth Patterson	George T. Poole	Hajime Doi	7 furlongs	1:23.80	$22,300		
1975	Navajo	5	Jimmy Nichols	James Keefer	Joe Stevenson & Ray Stump	7 furlongs	1:24.40	$22,775		
1974	Barbizon Streak	6	Rick Wilson	Oran Battles	Mrs. Herman (Irene C.) Udouj	7 furlongs	1:25.40	$23,100		
1973	Code of Honor	5	Earlie Fires	Chuck Werstler	Dixiana Farm	7 furlongs	1:23.00	$23,225		
1972	List	4	Jimmy Nichols	Alcee Richard	Mrs. Joe (Dorothy Dorsett) Brown	7 furlongs	1:23.30	$24,250		
1971	No No Billy	4	Don MacBeth	Stanley M. Rieser	Paul & Robert Schleicher	7 furlongs	1:23.20	$23,600		
1970	True North	4	Mike Manganello	George T. Poole	Cornelius Vanderbilt Whitney	7 furlongs	1:22.60	$17,000		
1969	Judge Kilday	4	David E. Whited	Ronnie Warren	Mr. & Mrs. Robert F. Roberts	7 furlongs	1:23.60	$17,200		
1968	Cabildo	5	Jimmy Combest	Alcee Richard	Mrs. Joe (Dorothy Dorsett) Brown	7 furlongs	1:23.20	$16,775		
1967	Bay Phantom	5	Earlie Fires	Lyle S. Whiting	Charles Viar	7 furlongs	1:22.00	$17,575		
1966	Bay Phantom	4	Ronald J. Campbell	Robert E. Holthus	Charles Viar	7 furlongs	1:22.00	$16,350		
1965	Little Lu	4	Mike Manganello	Virgil H. Jaycox	Virgil H. Jaycox	7 furlongs	1:22.40	$14,000		
1964	Olden Times	6	Bill Shoemaker	Mesh Tenney	Rex Ellsworth	7 furlongs	1:21.40	$11,500		
1963	Editorialist	5	Manuel Ycaza	S. Bryant Ott	Fourth Estate Stable	7 furlongs	1:22.40	$11,275		
1962	Editorialist	4	Bill Shoemaker	S. Bryant Ott	Fourth Estate Stable	7 furlongs	1:22.60	$11,550		
1961	Cactus Tom	4	Larney Hansman	Thomas H. Stevens Sr.	Natjolee Stable	7 furlongs	1:22.40	$11,600		
1960	Little Fitz	5	William A. Peake	Robert C. Steele	John C. Hauer	7 furlongs	1:22.40	$11,575		
1959	Cuvier Boy	4	Steve Brooks	Milton Rinke	Sydney I. Crew	7 furlongs	1:22.40	$11,625		
1958	§ Shan Pac	4	Johnny Heckman	Vester R. Wright	T. Alie Grissom	7 furlongs	1:22.00	$11,650		
1957	Swoon's Son	4	David Erb	Alexis G. Wilson	E. Gay Drake	7 furlongs	1:24.60	$12,000		
1956	Scrutinized	6	William M. Cook	Frank J. Baker	Buddah Stable	7 furlongs	1:25.40	$12,350		
1955	Torch of War	5	John Adams	Harry Trotsek	Hasty House Farm	6 furlongs	1:11.20	$11,650		
1954	§ Sunny Dale	6	Paul Bailey	Dwight Denham	Buddah Stable	6 furlongs	1:11.00	$12,475		
1953	Roaming	4	Jorge Contreras	Horatio Luro	Herman B. Delman	6 furlongs	1:10.60	$11,675		
1952	ƒ Here's Hoping	5	Steve Brooks	Jack Hodgins	Dixiana Farm	6 furlongs	1:11.00	$11,725		
1951	Johns Joy	5	William M. Cook	John A. Kinard Jr.	John A. Kinard Jr.	7 furlongs	1:22.80	$12,025		
1950	Fleeting Star	4	Steve Brooks	Jack Hodgins	Dixiana Farm	7 furlongs	1:24.00	$12,175		
1949	Free America	4	Steve Brooks	Ben A. Jones	Calumet Farm	7 furlongs	1:25.00	$11,375		Exhibition Race
1948	George Gains	5	Antonio J. Fernandez	Keene Daingerfield	George R. Schneider	7 furlongs	1:25.20	$12,125		
1947	Dark Jungle	4	Steve Brooks	John Milton Goode	Lucas B. Combs	7 furlongs	1:25.20	$12,225		
1946	Bull Play	4	Robert J. Campbell	Lee Niles	Walter W. "Britches" Jones	1 mile	1:42.40	$11,775		
1945	Equifox	8	Albert Bodiou	Howard J. Wells	Howard J. Wells	1 mile	1:40.00	$5,750		
1944	ƒ Traffic Court	6	Willie Garner	Nick Burger	Mrs. M. E. Miller & Nick Burger	1 mile	1:36.80	$5,870		
1943	Best Seller	5	Johnny Longden	Rollie T. Shepp	John W. Galbreath & Robert J. Dienst	1 mile	1:38.40	$3,075		
1942	Royal Crusader	5	Arthur Craig	Paul Meredith	Rancho Casitas Stable	1 mile	1:37.40	$3,145		
1941	My Bill	3	Conn McCreary	John T. Weaver	William E. Smith	1 mile	1:36.60	$3,060		
1940	Arab's Arrow	6	Carroll Bierman	Gilbert Hardy	Louise Hickman	1 mile	1:39.80	$3,160		
1939	Arab's Arrow	5	Carroll Bierman	Gilbert Hardy	Louise Hickman	7 furlongs	1:24.80	$3,140		Dead heat
1939	Kings Blue	4	Charles Kurtsinger	Roscoe Goose	John Marsch	7 furlongs	1:24.80	$3,140		Dead heat
1938	Arab's Arrow	4	Willie Lee Johnson	Gilbert Hardy	Louise Hickman	7 furlongs	1:26.80	$3,020		
1914–1937		Race not held								
1913	Rudolfo	4	Johnny Loftus	William S. Trevey	Harry H. Emmons	1 1/8 miles	1:51.80	$1,000		
1912	Any Port	4	Joe Byrne	Frank D. Weir	Emerson E. McCargo	1 1/8 miles	1:51.60	$1,880		
1911	Carlton G.	4	George Taplin	Lon Johnson	Lon Johnson	1 1/8 miles	1:51.80	$2,500		

Notes:
§ Ran as an entry
ƒ Filly or Mare
† In the 2002 running of the event Snow Ridge was first past the post but was disqualified due the rider Mike E. Smith accidentally striking D'wildcat's face with his whip as the runners approached the finishing post. D'wildcat was declared the winner.

== See also ==
- List of American and Canadian Graded races
