= Forego Stakes =

- Class: Grade I
- Location: Saratoga Race Course; Saratoga Springs, New York, United States
- Inaugurated: 1980 (at Belmont Park as Forego Handicap)
- Race type: Thoroughbred – flat racing
- Website: NYRA

Race information
- Distance: 7 furlongs
- Surface: Dirt
- Track: left-handed
- Qualification: Four-year-olds and older
- Weight: 124 lbs with allowances
- Purse: $500,000 (2023)

The Forego Stakes is a Grade I American Thoroughbred horse race for horses four years old and older over the distance of seven furlongs on the dirt, scheduled annually in August at Saratoga Race Course in Saratoga Springs, New York. The event currently carries a purse of $500,000.

== History ==
This event is named for Forego, the American Horse of the Year for three straight years between 1974 and 1976.

The event was inaugurated on 27 August 1980, Opening Day of the Belmont Park Fall meeting for that year over a distance of one mile with handicap conditions and was won by Tanthem who was ridden by United States' Racing Hall of Fame jockey Jorge Velásquez in a time of 1:35 flat. The event was held at Belmont Park the following year but was moved in 1982 to Saratoga with a decrease in distance to seven furlongs.

In 1983 the event was classified as Grade III, and year after it was upgraded to Grade II.

From 2000 through 2002 the event was run at 6 1/2 furlongs before reverting to the seven-furlong distance in 2003.

In 2001, the event was upgraded to Grade I.

The event is considered a main preparatory race for either the Breeders' Cup Sprint at six furlongs, or the Breeders' Cup Dirt Mile. Several notable winners have followed such a path.

The 2020 and 2021 renewals were restricted to horses aged four years old and older.

== Records ==
Time record:

- 7 furlongs: 1:20.80 – Mitole (2019)

Margins:

- 8 lengths – Affirmed Success (1998)

Most wins:

- 2 – Groovy (1986, 1987)
- 2 – Quick Call (1988, 1989)

Most wins by an owner:

- 3 – Godolphin Racing (2009, 2012, 2022)

Most wins by a jockey:

- 4 – Ángel Cordero Jr. (1981, 1983, 1985, 1987)

Most wins by a trainer:

- 4 – Robert J. Frankel (2003, 2004, 2005, 2008)

== Winners ==
Year	Winner	Age	Jockey	Trainer	Owner	Distance	Time	Purse	Grade	Ref
At Saratoga – Forego Stakes
2026	Hymn	4	Ricardo Santana Jr.	Ron Moquett	Fleur de Lis Stables, William S. Sparks, and Bret Jones	7 furlongs	1:22.48	$500,000	I	
2025	Book’em Danno	4	Paco Lopez	Derek S. Ryan	Atlantic Six Racing	7 furlongs	1:22.43	$500,000	I	
2024	Mullikin	4	Flavien Prat	Rodolphe Brisset	Siena Farm & WinStar Farm	7 furlongs	1:21.75	$500,000	I	
2023	Gunite	4	Tyler Gaffalione	Steven Asmussen	Winchell Thoroughbreds	7 furlongs	1:21.53	$485,000	I	
2022	Cody's Wish	4	Junior Alvarado	William I. Mott	Godolphin Racing	7 furlongs	1:20.95	$589,000	I	
2021	Yaupon	4	Ricardo Santana Jr.	Steven M. Asmussen	William L. & Corinne Heiligbrodt	7 furlongs	1:21.74	$600,000	I	
2020	Win Win Win	4	Javier Castellano	Michael J. Trombetta	Live Oak Racing (Charlotte Weber)	7 furlongs	1:21.71	$300,000	I	
2019	Mitole	4	Ricardo Santana Jr.	Steven M. Asmussen	William L. & Corinne Heiligbrodt	7 furlongs	1:20.80	$576,950	I	
2018	Whitmore	5	Ricardo Santana Jr.	Ron Moquett	Robert V. LaPenta, Ron Moquett & Head of Plains Partners	7 furlongs	1:21.46	$600,000	I	
2017	Drefong	4	Mike E. Smith	Bob Baffert	Baoma Corporation	7 furlongs	1:21.12	$600,000	I	
2016	A. P. Indian	6	Joe Bravo	Arnaud Delacour	Green Lantern Stables	7 furlongs	1:20.99	$700,000	I	
2015	Private Zone	6	Martin A. Pedroza	Jorge Navarro	Good Friends Stable	7 furlongs	1:21.09	$700,000	I	
2014	Palace	5	Cornelio Velásquez	Linda L. Rice	Antonino Miuccio	7 furlongs	1:21.95	$500,000	I	
2013	Strapping Groom	6	Junior Alvarado	David Jacobson	David Jacobson & Drawing Away Stable	7 furlongs	1:22.27	$500,000	I	
2012	Emcee	4	Alan Garcia	Kiaran P. McLaughlin	Godolphin Racing	7 furlongs	1:21.00	$500,000	I	
2011	Jackson Bend	4	Corey Nakatani	Nicholas P. Zito	Robert V. LaPenta	7 furlongs	1:22.08	$250,000	I	
2010	Here Comes Ben	4	Alex O. Solis	Charles LoPresti	Marianne I. Chase & Brandon L. Chase.	7 furlongs	1:22.50	$250,000	I	
2009	Pyro	4	John R. Velazquez	Saeed bin Suroor	Godolphin Racing	7 furlongs	1:21.48	$300,000	I	
2008	First Defence	4	Channing Hill	Robert J. Frankel	Juddmonte Farms	7 furlongs	1:21.55	$250,000	I	
2007	Midnight Lute	4	Shaun Bridgmohan	Bob Baffert	Michael E. Pegram & Watson and Weitman Performances	7 furlongs	1:21.06	$250,000	I	
2006	Pomeroy	5	John R. Velazquez	Martin D. Wolfson	Silverleaf Farms Inc.	7 furlongs	1:23.39	$250,000	I	
2005	Mass Media	4	Javier Castellano	Robert J. Frankel	Gary & Mary West Stables	7 furlongs	1:22.59	$250,000	I	
Forego Handicap
2004	Midas Eyes	4	Edgar S. Prado	Robert J. Frankel	Edmund A. Gann	7 furlongs	1:22.22	$250,000	I	
2003	Aldebaran	5	Jerry D. Bailey	Robert J. Frankel	Flaxman Holdings	7 furlongs	1:21.26	$250,000	I	
2002	Orientate	4	Jerry D. Bailey	D. Wayne Lukas	Robert B. & Beverly Lewis	6 1/2 furlongs	1:15.68	$250,000	I	
2001	Delaware Township	5	Jerry D. Bailey	Benjamin W. Perkins Jr.	New Farm	6 1/2 furlongs	1:15.53	$250,000	I	
2000	Shadow Caster	4	Jorge F. Chavez	John P. Terranova II	Gatsas Stables	6 1/2 furlongs	1:15.00	$250,000	II	
1999	Crafty Friend	6	Gary L. Stevens	John C. Kimmel	Ahmed bin Salman	7 furlongs	1:21.32	$250,000	II	
1998	Affirmed Success	4	Jorge F. Chavez	Richard E. Schosberg	Albert Fried Jr.	7 furlongs	1:21.98	$194,000	II	
1997	Score a Birdie	6	Herb McCauley	Guadalupe Preciado	Joseph Imbesi	7 furlongs	1:22.47	$200,000	II	
1996	Langfuhr	4	Jorge F. Chavez	Michael Keogh	Gustav Schickedanz	7 furlongs	1:21.90	$150,000	II	
1995	Not Surprising	5	Robbie Davis	Judson Van Worp	Robert Van Worp	7 furlongs	1:21.91	$104,000	II	
1994	American Chance	5	Pat Day	David M. Carroll	John D. Gunther	7 furlongs	1:22.74	$110,000	II	
1993	Birdonthewire	4	Mike E. Smith	Philip M. Serpe	Robert Kaufman	7 furlongs	1:21.88	$121,800	II	
1992	Rubiano	5	Julie Krone	Flint S. Schulhofer	Centennial Farms	7 furlongs	1:22.54	$116,800	II	
1991	Housebuster	4	Craig Perret	Jimmy Croll	Robert P. Levy	7 furlongs	1:21.08	$115,800	II	
1990	Lay Down	6	Chris Antley	Claude R. McGaughey III	Ogden Mills Phipps	7 furlongs	1:22.80	$86,400	II	
1989	Quick Call	5	Pat Day	Sidney J. Watters Jr.	Lynda S. Stokes	7 furlongs	1:21.80	$113,200	II	
1988	Quick Call	4	Pat Day	Sidney J. Watters Jr.	Lynda S. Stokes	7 furlongs	1:21.00	$114,200	II	
1987	Groovy	4	Ángel Cordero Jr.	Jose A. Martin	Prestonwood Farm	7 furlongs	1:21.80	$112,600	II	
1986	Groovy	3	José A. Santos	Jose A. Martin	John A. Ballis	7 furlongs	1:21.20	$117,200	II	
1985	Ziggy's Boy	3	Ángel Cordero Jr.	Walter A. Kelley	John B. Singer	7 furlongs	1:21.20	$88,350	II	
1984	Mugatea	4	Robbie Davis	John O. Hertler	Paul Hoffman	7 furlongs	1:22.40	$88,940	II	
1983	Maudlin	5	Ángel Cordero Jr.	Jan H. Nerud	Tartan Farms	7 furlongs	1:21.60	$54,300	III	
1982	Engine One	4	Ruben Hernandez	Sylvester E. Veitch	Benjamin Ferguson II	7 furlongs	1:21.20	$55,600		
At Belmont Park
1981	Fappiano	4	Ángel Cordero Jr.	Jan H. Nerud	John A. Nerud	1 mile	1:33.80	$83,700		
1980	Tanthem	5	Jorge Velásquez	Douglas J. Worswick	Ronald Worswick	1 mile	1:35.00	$85,050		

== See also ==
List of American and Canadian Graded races
