= Office Queen =

American-bred Thoroughbred racehorse

- Sire: Fair Ruler
- Grandsire: Nasrullah
- Dam: Determine Gal
- Damsire: Determine
- Sex: Filly
- Foaled: 1967
- Country: United States
- Colour: Brown
- Breeder: Stephen A. Calder
- Owner: Stephen A. Calder
- Trainer: Budd Lepman
- Record: 39: 16-6-8
- Earnings: $385,690

Major wins
- Mother Goose Stakes (1970); Black-Eyed Susan Stakes (1970); Cotillion Handicap (1970); Jasmine Stakes (1970); Mimosa Stakes (1970); Betsy Ross Handicap (1970)

Awards
- DRF American Champion Three-Year-Old Filly (1970)

Honours
- Office Queen Stakes at Calder Race Course

Office Queen (foaled 1967 in Florida; died in 1985) was a brown American Champion racehorse. Owned and bred by Stephen A. Calder, she descended from Nasrullah and Nearco.

== Racing career ==
In 1969 at age two, Office Queen won the Mermaid Stakes and had a strong second-place finish in the Selima Stakes at Laurel Park Racecourse and a third in the Gardenia Stakes at Ellis Park.

In 1970 at age three, Office Queen reeled off nine stakes wins, including big victories in the Mother Goose Stakes at Belmont Park and the Black-Eyed Susan Stakes at Pimlico Racecourse. She also won the Cotillion Handicap, Mimosa Stakes, Jasmine Stakes, Post-Deb Stakes and Betsy Ross Handicap. That year, she placed second in the Delaware Oaks, Florida Breeders' Handicap (Carl G. Rose Memorial) and Comely Stakes at Aqueduct as well as finishing third in the Matchmaker Stakes, Monmouth Oaks and Alabama Stakes at Saratoga Race Course.

Office Queen was voted Champion Three-Year-Old Filly in 1970, by the Daily Racing Form. Fanfreluche won the rival Thoroughbred Racing Association poll in the last year that champions were voted on separately.

== Retirement ==
The $100,000 Office Queen Stakes is run in early June each year at Calder Racecourse. After retirement, Office Queen was sold to Marylander Joseph M. O'Farrell, who became one of the pioneers of Central Florida stud farms and is considered one of the founding fathers of the Ocala, Florida, horse business. As Ocala Stud Farm's general manager, O'Farrell began his operation with broodmares Office Queen and My Dear Girl and the stallion Rough'n Tumble from Maryland. Having top foundation stock helped O'Farrell turn the annual auction of state-bred two-year-olds at Hialeah from a local affair to a nationally important market. As a broodmare, Office Queen produced several winners, including Crème Parfait with sire Bold Bidder. She was also the granddam of Champion Moscow Burning.
