= Budd Lepman =

Personal information
- Born: August 19, 1917
- Died: June 8, 1999 (aged 81)
- Occupation: Trainer

Horse racing career
- Sport: Horse racing

Major racing wins
- Bahamas Stakes (1963); Hutcheson Stakes (1963); Mermaid Stakes (1969); Princess Doreen Handicap (1969); Mother Goose Stakes (1970); Black-Eyed Susan Stakes (1970); Cotillion Handicap (1970); Bed O' Roses Handicap (1971); Vagrancy Handicap (1971); Brandywine Handicap (1973); Longfellow Handicap (1973); Oceanport Stakes (1973); Sorority Stakes (1973); Camden Handicap (1974); Riggs Handicap (1974); Hialeah Sprint Championship Handicap (1984); Tallahassee Handicap (1984) Breeders' Cup wins: Breeders' Cup Sprint (1984)

Racing awards
- Leading trainer at Monmouth Park (1963,1964, 1969, 1970, 1971)

Significant horses
- Eillo, Office Queen

Budd Lepman (August 19, 1917 – June 8, 1999) was an American Thoroughbred horse racing trainer who trained two Champions, won a record five training titles at Monmouth Park Racetrack, and by the early 1970s was regarded as "one of the nation's leading trainers".

Lepman was a native of Chicago where his father Horace was a broker and member of the Chicago Mercantile Exchange. His mother's brother was Benjamin Lindheimer who owned Arlington Park and Washington Park Race Tracks as well as the Los Angeles Dons of the All-America Football Conference. Lepman initially trained horses in the Chicago area but in the early 1960s moved operations to a base in New Jersey and Florida during the winter months.

On July 27, 1969, Lepman saddled four winners at Monmouth Park, a feat thought to be a first for any trainer since the racetrack opened in 1946. During his career, Lepman trained two Champions. The first was in 1970, when he conditioned Office Queen to American Champion Three-Year-Old Filly honors and the second in 1984 when Eillo was voted American Champion Sprint Horse following an outstanding year that included a win in the inaugural running of the Breeders' Cup Sprint.

Lepman was living in Hallandale, Florida, at the time of his death in 1999.
