= Count Fleet Sprint Handicap =

American Thoroughbred horse race

- Class: Grade III
- Location: Oaklawn Park Race Track; Hot Springs, Arkansas, United States
- Inaugurated: 1974
- Race type: Thoroughbred - Flat racing
- Website: Oaklawn Jockey Club, Inc.

Race information
- Distance: 6 furlongs
- Surface: Dirt
- Track: Left-handed
- Qualification: Four-years-old & up
- Weight: Assigned
- Purse: $500,000 (2019)

The Count Fleet Sprint Handicap is a Grade III American Thoroughbred horse race held annually in mid April. It takes place at Oaklawn Park Race Track in Hot Springs, Arkansas. During the race, horses age four and older compete over the sprint distance of six furlongs. Inaugurated in 1974, the event currently offers a purse of US$500,000.

The race is named in honor of the 1943 United States Triple Crown champion, Count Fleet.

In 2020, Whitmore became the first horse to win the Count Fleet Sprint Handicap three times.

== Records ==
Speed record:

- 1:08.00 @ 6 furlongs - Bonapaw (2001)

Most wins:

- 3 - Whitmore (2017, 2018, 2020)

Most wins by a jockey:

- 7 - Ricardo Santana Jr. (2013, 2014, 2017, 2018, 2019, 2023, 2024)

Most wins by a trainer

- 7 - Steven M. Asmussen (2013, 2014, 2019, 2022, 2023, 2024, 2025)

Most wins by an owner:

- 3 - Southern Springs Stables (2017, 2018, 2020)
- 3- Robert V. LaPenta (2017, 2018, 2020)
- 3- Head of Plains Partners LLC (2017, 2018, 2020)

== Winners ==
Year	Winner	Age	Jockey	Trainer	Owner	Time	Win$
2026	Mad House	4	Paco Lopez	David VanWinkle	James Thares	1:08.93	$285,000
2025	Booth	4	Erik Asmussen	Steven M. Asmussen	L. William Heiligbrodt, Corinne Heiligbrodt, Jackpot Farm and Whispering Oaks Farm LLC	1:09.82	$285,000
2024	Skelly	5	Ricardo Santana Jr.	Steven M. Asmussen	Red Lan Thoroughbreds LLC	1:08.82	$285,000
2023	Skelly	4	Ricardo Santana Jr.	Steven M. Asmussen	Red Lane Thoroughbreds	1:09.20	$300,000
2022	Jackie's Warrior	4	Joel Rosario	Steven M. Asmussen	Kirk Robison & Judy Robison	1:09.09	$300,000
2021	C Z Rocket	7	Florent Geroux	Peter Miller	Madaket Stables, Gary Barber, & Tom Kagele	1:09.62	$300,000
2020	Whitmore	7	Joseph Talamo	Ron Moquett	Southern Springs Stables, R. V. LaPenta & Head of Plains Partners LLC	1:08.95	$350,000
2019	Mitole	4	Ricardo Santana Jr.	Steven M. Asmussen	William L. & Corinne Heiligbrodt	1:09.36	$300,000
2018	Whitmore	5	Ricardo Santana Jr.	Ron Moquett	Southern Springs Stables, Robert V. LaPenta & Head of Plains Partners LLC	1:09.77	$240,000
2017	Whitmore	4	Ricardo Santana Jr.	Ron Moquett	Southern Springs Stables, Robert V. LaPenta & Head of Plains Partners LLC	1:08.35	$240,000
2016	Subtle Indian	4	Ramon A. Vazquez	Robertino Diodoro	Mercedes Stables	1:08.80	$240,000
2015	Alsvid	6	Chris Landeros	Chris A. Hartman	Black Hawk Stable	1:08.36	$180,000
2014	Lemon Drop Dream	4	Ricardo Santana Jr.	Steven M. Asmussen	Mike McCarty	1:09.15	$180,000
2013	Justin Phillip	5	Ricardo Santana Jr.	Steven M. Asmussen	Zayat Stables	1:09.63	$150,000
2012	Outta Tune	7	Terry Thompson	Chris Richard	Maggi Moss	1:09.35	$150,000
2011	Smiling Tiger	4	Joel Rosario	Jeffrey L. Bonde	Lebherz Racing & Klein	1:08.63	$120,000
2010	Custom for Carlos	5	Mike Smith	Eddie Kenneally	Homewrecker Racing & Avalon Farm	1:09.05	$90,000
2009	Semaphore Man	7	Clifton Berry	Kelly Von Hemel	Double Bogey Stable	1:09.94	$90,000
2008	Semaphore Man	6	Timothy Doocy	Kelly Von Hemel	Double Bogey Stable	1:09.78	$90,000
2007	Bordonaro	6	Richard Migliore	William Spawr	Fred Carrillo/Daniel A. Cassella	1:09.11	$90,000
2006	Bordonaro	5	Pat Valenzuela	William Spawr	Courtlandt Farm	1:08.77	$90,000
2005	Top Commander	5	Carlos Gonzalez	Cole Norman	Courtlandt Farm	1:08.74	$90,000
2004	Shake You Down	6	Ramon Dominguez	Scott A. Lake	Robert Cole, Jr.	1:09.27	$90,000
2003	Beau's Town	5	Jamie Theriot	Cole Norman	Coast to Coast & David J. Hulkewicz	1:09.00	$90,000
2002	Explicit	5	Lonnie Meche	Ian P. D. Jory	Marvin Malmuth	1:08.60	$90,000
2001	Bonapaw	5	Gerard Melancon	Howard R. Alonzo	Jim & Dennis Richard	1:08.00	$75,000
2000	Show Me the Stage	4	David Flores	Eric J. Guillot	Eric J. Guillot, et al	1:09.60	$75,000
1999	Reraise	4	Corey Nakatani	Craig Dollase	Class Racing, Fey & Han	1:08.40	$75,000
1998	Chindi	4	Don Pettinger	Steve Hobby	Cres-Ran, LLC	1:09.60	$75,000
1997	High Stakes Player	5	Kent Desormeaux	Bob Baffert	Michael E. Pegram	1:08.80	$90,000
1996	Concept Win	6	Gary Stevens	Thomas F. Proctor	Glen Hill Farm	1:09.00	$90,000
1995	Hot Jaws	5	Calvin Borel	Jeffrey N. Jacobs	Chocktaw Racing Stable	1:09.40	$90,000
1994	Demaloot Demashoot	4	Mike Smith	Mark A. Hennig	Team Valor Stables	1:08.20	$90,000
1993	Approach	6	Pat Day	Anthony L. Reinstedler	Hermitage Farm	1:09.60	$90,000
1992	Gray Slewpy	4	Kent Desormeaux	Daniel L. Hendricks	Ed Friendly	1:08.80	$60,000
1991	Overpeer	7	Pat Day	Robert E. Holthus	Dan Jones & H. E. Sutton	1:08.20	$60,000
1990	Malagra	4	V. L. Smith	Tonia Nolan	Mike Hooks	1:08.80	$60,000
1989	Twice Around	4	Calvin Borel	Cecil P. Borel	Janelle Grum	1:09.20	$60,000
1988	Salt Dome	5	Larry Snyder	Frank L. Brothers	Rogers Trust & Michael G. Rutherford	1:08.60	$60,000
1987	Sun Master	6	Gary Stevens	D. Wayne Lukas	Jeff & D. Wayne Lukas	1:09.40	$69,540
1986	Mister Gennaro	5	Frank Olivares	William Spawr	Hobie Alter	1:08.80	$71,100
1985	Taylor's Special	4	Randy Romero	William I. Mott	William F. Lucas	1:08.40	$98,280
1984	Dave's Friend	9	Eddie Delahoussaye	Jack Van Berg	John Franks	1:10.00	$70,260
1983	Dave's Friend	8	Larry Snyder	Jack Van Berg	John Franks	1:09.00	$70,320
1982	Sandbagger	4	Darrell Haire	J. Bert Sonnier	Tri Cee Farm	1:12.00	$39,240
1981	General Custer	5	Larry Snyder	Dennis Werre	Ben Erickson & Jack Van Berg	1:10.40	$34,470
1980	Silent Dignity	4	Sam Maple	Joseph B. Cantey	Carter Thornton	1:11.00	$34,680
1979	Amadevil	5	Thomas G. Greer	Orville D. Kemling	Kemling Bros.	1:11.20	$34,890
1978	Last Buzz	5	Allen Rini	George H. Hallock	Taylor Faulkner & Everett Lowrance	1:11.00	$33,390
1977	Silver Hope	6	Rudy Turcotte	Charles O. Battles	Irene C. Udouj	1:10.40	$18,480
1976	Brets Kicker	5	Jerry Bailey	Ray Spencer	C. Barrett	1:10.00	$17,640
1975	Prince Astro	6	David Whited	William C. Thomas	C. L. Warner	1:10.00	$18,030
1974	Barbizon Streak	6	Rick Wilson	Oran Battles	Irene C. Udouj	1:11.00	$17,370
