= King Cotton Stakes =

American thoroughbred horse racer

- Class: Listed stakes
- Location: Oaklawn Racing Casino Resort; Hot Springs, Arkansas, United States
- Inaugurated: 1992
- Race type: Thoroughbred - Flat racing

Race information
- Distance: Six Furlongs
- Surface: Dirt
- Track: left-handed
- Qualification: Four-year-olds and up
- Weight: 122 lbs
- Purse: $100,000-$125,000

The King Cotton Stakes is an American Thoroughbred horse race held annually in February at Oaklawn Racing Casino Resort in Hot Springs, Arkansas. It is a Listed race and has also been held as a "Black Type" race. The race is typically six furlongs in length. The race was first ran in 1992.

== Records ==
Speed Record:

- 1:04.08 – Kirby B (1996)

Most wins:

- 2 – Beau's Town (2003, 2006)
- 2 – Semaphorne Man (2007, 2008)
- 2 – Native Ruler (2009, 2011)
- 2 – Apprehender (2013, 2014)
- 2 – Ivan Fallunovalot (2015, 2016)

Most wins by a jockey:

- 6 – Calvin Borel (1997, 2000, 2006, 2010, 2015, 2016)

Most wins by a trainer:

- 4 – Chris Richard (2009, 2011, 2013, 2014)
- 5 – Steven M. Asmussen (2012, 2020, 2021, 2023, 2024)

Most Wins by an owner:

- 2 – Coast To Coast Racing Fund & David Hulkewicz (2003, 2006)
- 2 – Double Bogey Racing (2007, 2008)
- 2 – Maggi Ross (2008, 2011)
- 2 – Dream Farm LLC (2013, 2014)
- 2 – Lewis E. Mathews Jr. (2015, 2016)

== Recent Winners ==
Year	Winner	Jockey	Trainer	Owner	Time
2025	Tejano Twist	Flavien Prat	Chris A. Hartman	JD Thoroughbreds LLC and Davis, Joey Keith	1:10.82
2024	Skelly	Ricardo Santana Jr.	Steven M. Asmussen	Red Lane Thoroughbreds LLC	1:09.38
2023	Gunite	Ricardo Santana Jr.	Steven M. Asmussen	Winchell Thoroughbreds	1:08.89
2022	Bob's Edge	Luis S. Quinonez	J. Larry Jones	Michael Freeny, Patricia Freeny, & Jennifer Grayson Taylor	1:10.50
2021	Boldor	David Cabrera	Steven M. Asmussen	Ed Orr & Susie Orr	1:09.86
2020	Share the Upside	Stewart Elliott	Steven M. Asmussen	Hill 'n' Dale Farms and Windsor Boys Racing	1:09.39
2019	Heartwood	David Cohen	James K. Chapman	Tsujimoto, Stuart and David A. Bernsen, LLC	1:09.99
2018	Wilbo	David Cabrera	Chris A. Hartman	Chris Wilkins	1:09.85
2017	Storm Advisory	Geovanni Franco	Shane Meyers	Lori Acree	1:09.85
2016	Ivan Fallunovalot	Calvin Borel	Kathleen Howard	Lewis E. Mathews Jr.	1:09.21
2015	Ivan Fallunovalot	Calvin Borel	Kathleen Howard	Lewis E. Mathews Jr.	1:08.94
2014	Apprehender	David Mello	Chris Richard	Dream Farm LLC	1:10.19
2013	Apprehender	Alex Birzer	Chris Richard	Dream Farm LLC	1:10.08
2012	Riley Tucker	Cliff Berry	Steven M. Asmussen	Zayat Stables	1:11.15
2011	Native Ruler	Terry Thompson	Chris Richard	Maggi Ross	1:10.15
2010	Cosmic	Calvin Borel	Cecil Borel	Mary Grum	1:12.25
2009	Native Ruler	Eusebio Razo Jr.	Chris Richard	Maggi Ross	1:09.66
2008	Semaphorne Man	Timothy Doocy	Kelly Von Hemel	Double Bogey Racing	1:09.70
2007	Semaphorne Man	Timothy Doocy	Kelly Von Hemel	Double Bogey Racing	1:10.11
2006	Beau's Town	Calvin Borel	Cole Norman	Coast To Coast Racing Fund & David Hulkewicz	1:11.30
2005	Deputy Storm	Luis S. Quinonez	Ralph Nicks	James C. Spence	1:10.32
2004	Skeet	John McKee	Robert Holthus	Fly Racing LLC	1:09.38
2003	Beau's Town	Anthony Lovato	Cole Norman	Coast To Coast Racing Fund & David Hulkewicz	1:09.16
2002	King's Command	Luis S. Quinonez	Robert Holthus	Eugene L. Grandon	1:09.90
2001	Bidis	Joseph Judice	Jesse Wigginton	Ross Harris	1:09.91
2000	Smolderin Heart	Calvin Borel	Terry Brennan	Mark Rand & Jean Brennan	1:09.77
1999	EJ Harley	James Lopez	David Vance	Wilbur M. Giles	1:09.67
1998	Iron Post	Robert Williams	Randy Morse	Classic Stable Inc.	1:09.97
1997	Quixote's Luck	Calvin Borel	Cecil Borel	Janelle Grum	1:03.41
1996	Kirby B	Robert Williams	Wade White	Joe Colley & Deanne White	1:04.08
1995	Groovy Add Vice	Ricky Fraizer	Dallas Keen	Dallas Keen	1:05.59
1994	Sticks and Bricks	Andrea Seefeldt	Richard Small	Robert E. Meyerhoff	1:03.27
1993	Revel	Austin Lovelace	James F. Hovezak	James F. Hovezak	1:03.69
1992	Kelly's Copy	Glen Murphy	Bruce Bell	Gay Flint	1:04.80
