= Mitole =

American thoroughbred racehorse

- Breed: Thoroughbred
- Sire: Eskendereya
- Grandsire: Giant's Causeway
- Dam: Indian Miss
- Damsire: Indian Charlie
- Sex: Stallion
- Foaled: 2015
- Country: USA
- Color: Bay
- Breeder: Edward A. Cox Jr.
- Owner: William L. & Corinne Heiligbrodt
- Trainer: Steve Asmussen
- Record: 14: 10-2-2
- Earnings: $3,104,910

Major wins
- Bachelor Stakes (2018); Chick Lang Stakes (2018); Count Fleet Sprint Handicap (2019); Churchill Downs Stakes (2019); Metropolitan Handicap (2019); Forego Stakes (2019) Breeders' Cup wins: Breeders' Cup Sprint (2019)

Awards
- American Champion Male Sprint Horse (2019)

Mitole (foaled March 23, 2015) is a retired American Thoroughbred racehorse who was foaled and raised at Hermitage Farm in Oldham County, Kentucky. He was named the American Champion Male Sprint Horse of 2019 after winning six of seven starts that year including the Churchill Downs Stakes, Metropolitan Handicap, Forego Stakes, and Breeders' Cup Sprint.

== Background ==
Mitole is a bay horse who was bred in Kentucky by Hermitage Farm's long-time client Edward A. Cox Jr. His sire Eskendereya won the Wood Memorial Stakes and was a favorite for the 2010 Kentucky Derby before being scratched due to injury. Eskendereya began his stud career in Kentucky but was exported to Japan in 2015. His leading runners include Metropolitan Handicap winner Mor Spirit. Mitole's dam, Indian Miss by Indian Charlie, never won during a short racing career.

Mitole was sold for $20,000 at the 2016 Keeneland Yearling Sales. He was then resold for $140,000 as a two-year-old-in-training at the 2017 Ocala Breeders' Sale. His new owners, William and Corinne Heiligbrodt, placed him with Hall of Fame trainer Steve Asmussen.

== Racing career ==
Mitole's first race, and only start as a two-year-old, was on November 25, 2017, at the Fair Grounds in New Orleans, where he finished third.

He started his three-year-old campaign on January 13, 2018, in a maiden special weight race at Oaklawn Park, finishing second. On February 3, he entered another maiden race at Oaklawn, in which he led from the start and opened up in the stretch to win by 10 lengths. He earned a strong Beyer Speed Figure of 96 in the race, but Asmussen decided to keep the colt to sprint distances rather than test him on the Triple Crown trail.

Mitole made his stakes race debut in the listed Gazebo Stakes at Oaklawn on March 24, finishing second. He then won his next three starts, an allowance race on March 17, the Bachelor Stakes on April 12 (both at Oaklawn) and the Chick Lang Stakes on May 19 at Pimlico Race Course, all of them by wide margins in front-running fashion. In the Bachelor, he earned a Beyer Speed Figure of 107. "He's run some awfully big numbers," said William Heiligbrodt. "I've had a lot of horses, and I haven't had one this fast."

Mitole was next scheduled to race in the Woody Stephens Stakes but was sidelined by a splint bone injury. He missed the rest of his three-year-old campaign as a result.

Mitole returned to racing on March 2, 2019, with another win at Oaklawn Park as the 2-5 favorite in a six-furlong allowance race. He then made his first start in a graded stakes race at the Count Fleet Sprint Handicap on April 13. His main rival was veteran sprinter Whitmore, who had won the previous two runnings of the race. Over sloppy going, Mitole went to the early lead, followed closely by Whitmore. The two dueled for the first half mile, with Whitmore briefly getting a head in front turn. Mitole responded to the challenge by drawing clear in the stretch to win by 2 3/4 lengths. "To win his first graded stakes is special," said Asmussen. "He's an elite caliber horse. He handles the wet track extremely well."

Mitole made his first start at the Grade I level in the Churchill Downs Stakes on May 4 over a distance of seven furlongs. He went off as the 2-1 favorite in a field of 11 that included stakes winners Whitmore, Promised Fulfilled and Bobby's Wicked One. In a change of tactics, Mitole rated in third behind Promises Fulfilled and Bobby's Wicked One, who completed the first half mile in a fast :44.71 seconds. Mitole started his move on the far turn then continued to draw away down the stretch for a 3 1/2-length win.

Mitole then entered the prestigious Metropolitan Handicap (also known as the Met Mile) on June 8 at Belmont Park. The field included both sprinters like Mitole and Firenze Fire, hoping to stretch their speed out over the extra distance, and classic distance horses McKinzie and Thunder Snow, who were cutting back in distance after winning the Santa Anita Handicap and Dubai World Cup respectively. Mitole pressed the early pace set by Coal Front, moved to the lead at the head of the stretch and held off a late run from McKinzie to win by three-quarters of a length. "This is really a special horse," said jockey Ricardo Santana Jr. "He can come [from the] back, he can go in front, you can put him between horses and he always keeps trying his best."

Mitole's seven-race winning streak was broken in the six furlong Alfred G. Vanderbilt Handicap on July 27 at Saratoga Race Course, when he finished third to Imperial Hint. He rebounded in the Forego Stakes on August 24, in which he vied for the early lead with Promises Fulfilled then pulled away in the stretch to win by three lengths. He completed the seven furlongs in a stakes record time of 1:20.80. "I think the circumstances for the Vanderbilt just didn't suit him – coming off a huge run in the Met Mile and cutting back to three-quarters," said Asmussen. "But he came out of the race in good shape, trained beautifully for this, and the results speak for themselves."

On August 25, Spendthrift Farm announced that it had acquired the breeding rights to Mitole. Ned Toffey, the general manager of Spendthrift, commented that the colt's brilliance was best illustrated by his win in the Metropolitan Handicap. "That was both the field of the year and race of the year so far, and Mitole showed just how brilliantly fast and classy he is in that performance."

Mitole's win in the Metropolitan Handicap had earned him an all-expenses-paid berth in the $1 million Breeders Cup Dirt Mile but his connections instead decided to enter him in the $2 million Breeders' Cup Sprint, run in 2019 at Santa Anita Park over a distance of six furlongs on November 2. The field originally included Imperial Hint, who had beaten Mitole in the Vanderbilt at the same distance, but Imperial Hind developed a blister on his coronet band and had to be scratched. In his absence, Mitole's main rivals were expected to be Shancelot, who had won the Amsterdam Stakes by 12 1/2 lengths, and Catalina Cruiser (Pat O'Brien Stakes). Shancelot went to the early lead, completing the first quarter-mile in :21.47. Mitole settled a few lengths behind while racing wide, then started to make up ground as they rounded the final turn. Shancelot still had a narrow lead in mid-stretch but Mitole drew away in the final furlong to win by 1 1/2 lengths in a time of 1:09.

Heiligbrodt commended Asmussen for keeping Mitole in top form throughout the year, while Asmussen gave credit to the horse. "Nothing but class, and the ability he has is just tremendous," said Asmussen. "I don't know that people realize from where he was in the spring to stretching out to beating the field he did in the Met Mile, to retract from that and beat the best sprinters in the world... But it's a very difficult job, one that a horse of his elite abilities is capable of doing."

Mitole was named the American Champion Male Sprinter of 2019 at the 49th annual Eclipse Awards, the second champion produced from Hermitage Farm's grounds in 3 consecutive years.

== Stud career ==
Mitole was retired to stud at Spendthrift Farm after the Breeders' Cup. His stud fee for 2020 was set at $25,000.

=== Notable progeny ===
c = colt, f = filly, g = gelding

Foaled	Name	Sex	Major Wins
2022	Shisospicy	f	Breeders' Cup Turf Sprint (2025)

== Pedigree ==
Pedigree of Mitole (USA), bay colt, March 23, 2015
Sire Eskendereya (USA) 2007	Giant's Causeway (USA); 1997	Storm Cat	Storm Bird
Sire Eskendereya (USA) 2007	Giant's Causeway (USA); 1997	Storm Cat	Terlingua
Sire Eskendereya (USA) 2007	Giant's Causeway (USA); 1997	Mariah's Storm	Rahy
Sire Eskendereya (USA) 2007	Giant's Causeway (USA); 1997	Mariah's Storm	Immense
Sire Eskendereya (USA) 2007	Aldebaran Light (USA); 1996	Seattle Slew	Bold Reasoning
Sire Eskendereya (USA) 2007	Aldebaran Light (USA); 1996	Seattle Slew	My Charmer
Sire Eskendereya (USA) 2007	Aldebaran Light (USA); 1996	Altair	Alydar
Sire Eskendereya (USA) 2007	Aldebaran Light (USA); 1996	Altair	Stellar Odyssey
Dam Indian Miss (USA) 2009	Indian Charlie (USA); 1995	In Excess	Siberian Express
Dam Indian Miss (USA) 2009	Indian Charlie (USA); 1995	In Excess	Kantado
Dam Indian Miss (USA) 2009	Indian Charlie (USA); 1995	Soviet Soujourn	Leo Castelli
Dam Indian Miss (USA) 2009	Indian Charlie (USA); 1995	Soviet Soujourn	Political Parfait
Dam Indian Miss (USA) 2009	Glacken's Gal (USA); 2005	Smoke Glacken	Two Punch
Dam Indian Miss (USA) 2009	Glacken's Gal (USA); 2005	Smoke Glacken	Majesty's Crown
Dam Indian Miss (USA) 2009	Glacken's Gal (USA); 2005	Lady Diplomat	Silver Deputy
Dam Indian Miss (USA) 2009	Glacken's Gal (USA); 2005	Lady Diplomat	Merceds Miss (family 11-d)
