= Ricardo Santana Jr. =

Panamanian jockey (born 1992)

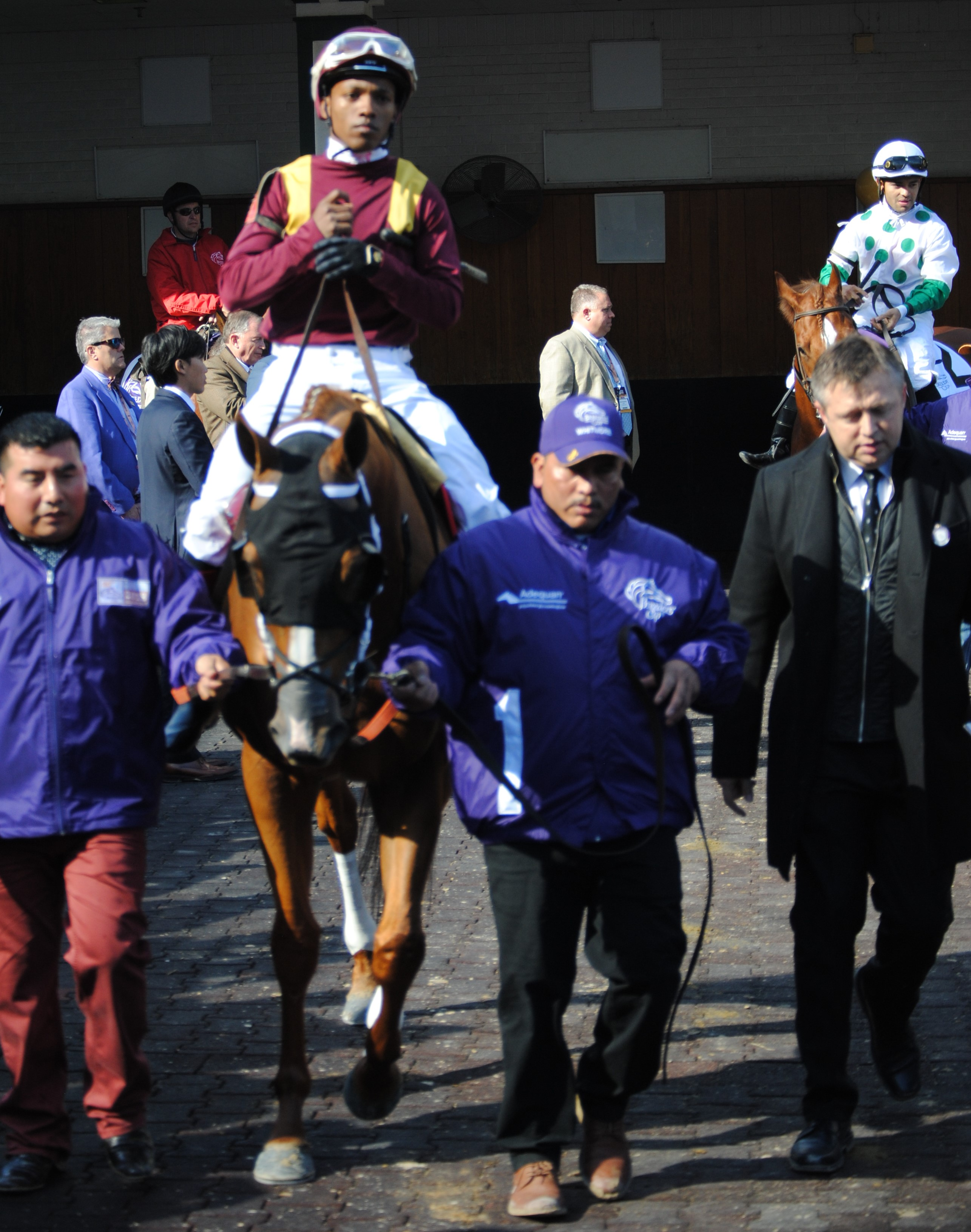
- Santana on Whitmore at the 2018 Breeders' Cup

Personal information
- Born: November 19, 1992 (age 33) Panama City, Panama
- Occupation: Jockey

Horse racing career
- Sport: Horse racing
- Career wins: 1,929 (as of 2024-07-17)

Major racing wins
- Count Fleet Sprint Handicap (2013, 2014, 2017, 2018, 2019); Arkansas Derby (2016,2021); Apple Blossom Handicap (2020); Metropolitan Handicap (2018, 2019); Forego Handicap (2018, 2019); Churchill Downs Stakes (2019); La Troienne Stakes (2019); Humana Distaff Stakes (2019); Fourstardave Handicap (2019); Rachel Alexandra Stakes (2020); Southwest Stakes (2020); Ogden Phipps Stakes (2020); H. Allen Jerkens Stakes (2020); Alfred G. Vanderbilt Handicap (2020); Breeders' Cup wins: Breeders' Cup Sprint (2019); Breeders' Cup Juvenile Turf (2020) Canadian Triple Crown wins: Prince of Wales Stakes (2019)

Racing awards
- Delaware Park Leading jockey (2012); Oaklawn Park Leading jockey (2013, 2014, 2015, 2016, 2017, 2018); Keeneland Leading Jockey (2017) (fall)

Significant horses
- Creator, Mitole, Whitmore

Ricardo Santana Jr. (born November 19, 1992) is a Panamanian jockey in American Thoroughbred racing who won six consecutive riding titles from 2013 through 2018 at Oaklawn Park and in 2019 won the Breeders' Cup Sprint as well as the Prince of Wales Stakes (2019), the second leg of the Canadian Triple Crown series.

From the El Chorrillo neighborhood in Panama City, Ricardo Santana Jr. graduated in December 2008 from the Laffit Pincay Jr. training school for jockeys. In 2009 he immigrated to the United States where he would get his first win on September 21 at Delaware Park Racetrack. He earned his first Grade I win aboard Creator in the 2016 Arkansas Derby.

On October 26, 2026, Santana was arrested in Louisville, Kentucky on charges of domestic violence. His riding license was subsequently suspended by the Kentucky Horse Racing and Gaming Commission pending the disposition of the charges, and he was taken off of his three mounts in that year's Breeders' Cup races.
