= Eillo =

American-bred Thoroughbred racehorse

- Sire: Mr. Prospector
- Grandsire: Raise a Native
- Dam: Barbs Dancer
- Damsire: Northern Dancer
- Sex: Stallion
- Foaled: 1980
- Country: United States
- Colour: Chestnut
- Breeder: Ollie A. Cohen
- Owner: Crown Stable
- Trainer: Budd Lepman
- Record: 17: 12-0-1
- Earnings: US$657,670

Major wins
- Hialeah Sprint Championship Handicap (1984); Chief Pennekeck Handicap (1984); Tallahassee Handicap (1984); Kendall Stakes (1984) Breeders' Cup wins: Breeders' Cup Sprint (1984)

Awards
- American Champion Sprint Horse (1984)

Honours
- Eillo Stakes at Monmouth Park Racetrack
- Last updated on June 21, 2010

Eillo (1980–1984) was an American Champion Thoroughbred racehorse who won the inaugural running of the Breeders' Cup Sprint in 1984. The name Eillo is Crown Stable owner Ollie Cohen's first name spelled in reverse.

Eillo was struck with a bout of colic and died at age four following surgery just four weeks after his win in the Breeders' Cup. The Eillo Stakes at Monmouth Park Racetrack was named in his memory.
