= Dancing Spree =

American thoroughbred racehorse

Dancing Spreed
- Sire: Nijinsky
- Grandsire: Northern Dancer
- Dam: Blitey
- Damsire: Riva Ridge
- Sex: Stallion
- Foaled: May 7, 1985
- Country: USA
- Color: Chestnut
- Breeder: Ogden Phipps
- Owner: Ogden Phipps
- Trainer: Claude R. McGaughey III
- Record: 35:10-6-9
- Earnings: $1,470,484

Major wins
- Carter Handicap (1990); Breeders' Cup Sprint (1989)

Dancing Spree (May 7, 1985 – February 6, 2011) was an American Thoroughbred racehorse and the winner of the 1990 Carter Handicap.

== Career ==
Dancing Spree's first race was on April 20, 1988, where he won at Keeneland Racecourse. His next win came weeks later on May 14, 1988, at Churchill Downs. He spent most of 1988 competing in allowance races.

He won his first Handicap, the Churchill Downs Stakes, on May 6, 1989. He placed in third at the 1989 Metropolitan Handicap then picked up summer victories in both the 1989 True North Stakes and the 1989 Suburban Handicap.

His next victory was on November 4, 1989, when he closed out the year by capturing the Breeders' Cup Sprint.

In his final year of racing at age five, Dancing Spree started it off with a win on February 4, 1990, in the Gulfstream Park Sprint Championship. He then got his last win on May 5, 1990, in the Carter Handicap. He attempted to capture the 1990 edition of the Breeders' Cup Sprint, but came in 6th. He then finished his career with a second place finish at the November 3, 1990, NYRA Mile Handicap.

== Pedigree ==
Pedigree of Dancing Spree (USA), 1985
Sire Nijinsky (CAN) 1967	Northern Dancer (CAN); 1961	Nearctic	Nearco
Sire Nijinsky (CAN) 1967	Northern Dancer (CAN); 1961	Nearctic	Lady Angela
Sire Nijinsky (CAN) 1967	Northern Dancer (CAN); 1961	Natalma	Native Dancer
Sire Nijinsky (CAN) 1967	Northern Dancer (CAN); 1961	Natalma	Almahmoud
Sire Nijinsky (CAN) 1967	Flaming Page (CAN); 1959	Bull Page	Bull Lea
Sire Nijinsky (CAN) 1967	Flaming Page (CAN); 1959	Bull Page	Our Page
Sire Nijinsky (CAN) 1967	Flaming Page (CAN); 1959	Flaring Top	Menow
Sire Nijinsky (CAN) 1967	Flaming Page (CAN); 1959	Flaring Top	Flaming Top
Dam Blitey (USA) 1976	Riva Ridge (USA); 1969	First Landing	Turn-To
Dam Blitey (USA) 1976	Riva Ridge (USA); 1969	First Landing	Hildene
Dam Blitey (USA) 1976	Riva Ridge (USA); 1969	Iberia	Heliopolis
Dam Blitey (USA) 1976	Riva Ridge (USA); 1969	Iberia	War East
Dam Blitey (USA) 1976	Lady Pitt (USA); 1963	Sword Dancer	Sunglow
Dam Blitey (USA) 1976	Lady Pitt (USA); 1963	Sword Dancer	Highland Fling
Dam Blitey (USA) 1976	Lady Pitt (USA); 1963	Rock Drill	Whirlaway
Dam Blitey (USA) 1976	Lady Pitt (USA); 1963	Rock Drill	Flyaway Home
