= Orientate =

American-bred Thoroughbred racehorse (1999–2026)

- Sire: Mt. Livermore
- Grandsire: Blushing Groom
- Dam: Dream Team
- Damsire: Cox's Ridge
- Sex: Stallion
- Foaled: March 29, 1999
- Died: August 17, 2026 (aged 27); Gainesway Farm, Lexington, Kentucky, U.S.
- Country: United States
- Colour: Bay
- Breeder: Gainesway Thoroughbreds Ltd.
- Owner: Robert B. & Beverly J. Lewis
- Trainer: D. Wayne Lukas
- Record: 19: 10-3-0
- Earnings: US$1,716,950

Major wins
- Indiana Derby (2001; Sir Beaufort Stakes (2001); Forego Handicap (2002); Commonwealth Breeders' Cup Handicap (2002); Alfred G. Vanderbilt Handicap (2002); Aristides Handicap (2002); Smile Sprint Handicap (2002) Breeders' Cup wins: Breeders' Cup Sprint (2002)

Awards
- American Champion Sprint Horse (2002)

Orientate (March 29, 1999 – August 17, 2026) was an American Thoroughbred racehorse who won the 2002 Breeder's Cup Sprint and was voted the U.S. Champion Sprint Horse of 2002.

A descendant of the great Nearco through his son Royal Charger, Orientate was bred by Gainesway Thoroughbreds Ltd. and raced by Bob & Beverly Lewis. He was sired by American multiple stakes winner Mt. Livermore and out of the Cox's Ridge mare, Dream Team.

Trained by U.S. Racing Hall of Fame inductee D. Wayne Lukas, Orientate retired from racing having won ten of his nineteen starts with earnings of US$1,716,950.

Orientale was euthanized at Gainesway Farm on August 17, 2026, at the age of 27.

== At stud ==
Purchased by Gainesway in partnership with Arrowfield Stud of Australia, Orientate was sent to stand at stud at Gainesway Farm near Lexington, Kentucky. Among his successful racing offspring to date includes American Grade I winner Lady Joanne and the Australian Grade II winner, Marveen.

== Pedigree ==
Pedigree of Orientate
Sire Mt. Livermore	Blushing Groom	Red God	Nasrullah
Sire Mt. Livermore	Blushing Groom	Red God	Spring Run
Sire Mt. Livermore	Blushing Groom	Runaway Bride	Wild Risk
Sire Mt. Livermore	Blushing Groom	Runaway Bride	Aimee
Sire Mt. Livermore	Flama Ardiente	Crimson Satan	Spy Song
Sire Mt. Livermore	Flama Ardiente	Crimson Satan	Papila
Sire Mt. Livermore	Flama Ardiente	Royal Rafale	Reneged
Sire Mt. Livermore	Flama Ardiente	Royal Rafale	Questar
Dam Dream Team	Cox's Ridge	Best Turn	Turn-To
Dam Dream Team	Cox's Ridge	Best Turn	Sweet Clementine
Dam Dream Team	Cox's Ridge	Our Martha	Ballydonnell
Dam Dream Team	Cox's Ridge	Our Martha	Corday
Dam Dream Team	Likely Double	Nodouble	Noholme
Dam Dream Team	Likely Double	Nodouble	Abla-Jay
Dam Dream Team	Likely Double	Likely Lark	T.V. Lark
Dam Dream Team	Likely Double	Likely Lark	Chadwick
