= H. Allen Jerkens Stakes =

- Class: Non-Listed Black Type
- Location: Gulfstream Park; Hallandale Beach, Florida, USA
- Inaugurated: 2015
- Race type: Thoroughbred – Flat racing
- Website: www.gulfstreampark.com

Race information
- Distance: 2 miles (16 furlongs)
- Surface: Turf
- Track: Left-handed
- Qualification: Three-year-olds & up
- Weight: Allowance
- Purse: $100,000

The H. Allen Jerkens Stakes at Gulfstream Park is a Thoroughbred horse race open to three year olds and up run at a distance of two miles on turf. The race is named in honor of the late U. S. Racing Hall of Fame trainer H. Allen Jerkens.

The first running of the H. Allen Jerkens was held on January 31, 2015, with Unitarian winning the race. Jerkens himself presented the trophy for the race, which was run two months before his death on March 18, 2015.

Following its second running in January 2016, the H. Allen Jerkens Stakes was moved to December on the Gulfstream Park racing calendar. As a result, there were two runnings of the race in 2016.

== Records ==
Speed record:

- 3:19.48 – Sir Anthony (2020)

Most wins by a jockey:

- 2 – Tyler Gaffalione (2016, 2017)
- 2 – José Ortiz (2019, 2022)
- 2 – Luis Saez (2018, 2021)

Most wins by a trainer:

- 4 – Todd Pletcher (2015, 2016, 2019, 2021)

Most wins by an owner:

- 3 – Michael M. Hui (2016, 2020, 2022)

== Winners ==
Gulfstream Park Media Guide:

Year	Winner	Age	Jockey	Trainer	Owner	Dist. M	Time	Purse
2022	Value Engineering	6	José Ortiz	Michael J. Maker	Michael M. Hui, Phil Forte	1 5/8 M (off turf)	2:43.01	$100,000
2021	Abaan	4	Luis Saez	Todd Pletcher	Eclipse Thoroughbred Partners, Alex Daigneault	2 M	3:21.60	$100,000
2020	Sir Anthony	5	Julien Leparoux	Anthony Mitchell	Michael M. Hui	2 M	3:19.48	$75,000
2019	American Tattoo	4	José Ortiz	Todd Pletcher	Calumet Farm/John Anthony Stables LLC	1 1/4 M (off turf)	2:04.26	$100,000
2018	Red Knight	4	Luis Saez	William Mott	Trinity Farm	2 M	3:19:87	$100,000
2017	Run Time	4	Tyler Gaffalione	Michael J. Maker	Bloom Racing LLC/Allen Racing LLC	2 M	3:23.97	$100,000
2016	Taghleeb	5	Tyler Gaffalione	Michael J. Maker	Michael M. Hui	2 M	3:22.20	$100,000
2016	Charming Kitten	6	John Velazquez	Todd Pletcher	Kenneth and Sarah Ramsey	2 M	3:33.87	$100,000
2015	Unitarian	5	Javier Castellano	Todd Pletcher	Robert S. Evans	2 M	3:23.22	$100,000

Notes:

- In 2016 there were two separate runnings of the race, in January and December.
- The 2019 race was run at 1 1/4 miles on the main track.
- The 2022 race was run at 1 5/8 miles on the all-weather track.
