= Breeders' Cup Sprint =

- The 2008 Breeders' Cup Sprint
- Class: Grade I
- Location: North America
- Inaugurated: 1984
- Race type: Thoroughbred – Flat racing
- Website: www.breederscup.com

Race information
- Distance: 6 furlongs (3/4 mile)
- Surface: Dirt
- Track: left-handed
- Qualification: Three-years-old & up
- Weight: Weight for Age
- Purse: US$2,000,000

The Breeders' Cup Sprint, currently branded as the Cygames Sprint for sponsorship reasons, is an American Weight for Age Grade I Thoroughbred horse race for horses three years old and older. Run on dirt over a distance of 6 Furlongs (3/4 mile), the race has been held annually since 1984 at a different racetrack in the United States or Canada as part of the Breeders' Cup World Championships.

== Automatic berths ==
Beginning in 2007, the Breeders' Cup developed the Breeders' Cup Challenge, a series of races in each division that allotted automatic qualifying bids to winners of defined races. Each of the fourteen divisions has multiple qualifying races. Note though that one horse may win multiple challenge races, while other challenge winners will not be entered in the Breeders' Cup for a variety of reasons such as injury or travel considerations.

In the Sprint division, runners are limited to 14 and there are up to three automatic berths. The 2022 "Win and You're In" races were:

1. the Bing Crosby Stakes, a Grade I race run in July at Del Mar racetrack in California
2. the Vosburgh Stakes, a Grade II race run in October at Belmont Park in New York
3. the Korea Sprint, a Grade III race run in September at Seoul Race Course in Gwacheon city

== Records ==
Most wins:

- 2 – Midnight Lute (2007, 2008)
- 2 – Roy H (2017, 2018)
- 2 – Elite Power (2022, 2023)

Most wins by a jockey:

- 4 – Corey Nakatani (1996, 1997, 1998, 2006)
- 4 – Irad Ortiz Jr. (2020, 2022, 2023, 2025)

Most wins by a trainer:

- 5 – Bob Baffert (1992, 2007, 2008, 2013, 2016)

Most wins by an owner:

- 3 – Michael E. Pegram & Watson & Weitman Performances (2007, 2008, 2013)

== Winners ==
Year	Winner	Age	Jockey	Trainer	Owner	Time	Purse	Grade
2026	T O Elvis (JPN)	4	Ryusei Sakai	Daisuke Takayanagi	Tomoya Ozasa	1:08.20	$2,000,000	I
2025	Bentornato	4	Irad Ortiz Jr.	Jose Francisco D'Angelo	Leon King Stable	1:08.20	$2,000,000	I
2024	Straight No Chaser	5	John Velazquez	Dan Blacker	MyRacehorse	1:08.62	$2,000,000	I
2023	Elite Power	5	Irad Ortiz Jr.	William I. Mott	Juddmonte Farm	1:08.34	$2,000,000	I
2022	Elite Power	4	Irad Ortiz Jr.	William I. Mott	Juddmonte Farm	1:09.11	$2,000,000	I
2021	Aloha West	4	José Ortiz	Wayne Catalano	Eclipse Thoroughbred Partners	1:08.49	$2,000,000	I
2020	Whitmore	7	Irad Ortiz Jr.	Ron Moquett	Robert V. LaPenta, Ron Moquett & Head of Plains Partners	1:08.61	$2,000,000	I
2019	Mitole	4	Ricardo Santana Jr.	Steven M. Asmussen	William L. & Corinne Heiligbrodt	1:09.00	$2,000,000	I
2018	Roy H	6	Paco Lopez	Peter Miller	Rockingham Ranch & D. A. Bernsen	1:08.24	$2,000,000	I
2017	Roy H	5	Kent Desormeaux	Peter Miller	Rockingham Ranch & D. A. Bernsen	1:08.61	$1,500,000	I
2016	Drefong	3	Martin Garcia	Bob Baffert	Baoma Corporation	1:08.79	$1,500,000	I
2015	Runhappy	3	Edgar Prado	Maria Borell	James McIngvale	1:08.58	$1,500,000	I
2014	Work All Week	5	Florent Geroux	Roger Brueggemann	Midwest Thoroughbreds Inc	1:08.28	$1,500,000	I
2013	Secret Circle	4	Martin Garcia	Bob Baffert	Michael E. Pegram & Watson & Weitman Performances	1:08.73	$1,500,000	I
2012	Trinniberg	3	Willie Martinez	Shivananda Parbhoo	Sherry Parbhoo	1:07.98	$1,500,000	I
2011	Amazombie	5	Mike E. Smith	Bill Spawr	Spawr & Sanford	1:09.17	$1,500,000	I
2010	Big Drama	4	Eibar Coa	David Fawkes	Harold Queen	1:09.05	$2,000,000	I
2009	Dancing in Silks	4	Joel Rosario	Carla Gaines	Ken Kinakin	1:08.14	$2,000,000	I
2008	Midnight Lute	5	Garrett Gomez	Bob Baffert	Michael E. Pegram & Watson & Weitman Performances	1:07.08	$2,000,000	I
2007	Midnight Lute	4	Garrett Gomez	Bob Baffert	Michael E. Pegram& Watson & Weitman Performances	1:09.18	$2,000,000	I
2006	Thor's Echo	4	Corey Nakatani	Doug O'Neill	R.S. Jaime & Suarez Racing	1:08.80	$2,000,000	I
2005	Silver Train	3	Edgar Prado	Richard Dutrow	Buckram Oak Farm	1:08.86	$2,000,000	I
2004	Speightstown	6	John Velazquez	Todd A. Pletcher	Eugene Melnyk	1:08.11	$1,000,000	I
2003	Cajun Beat	3	Cornelio Velásquez	Steve Margolis	Padua Stables & J. & J. Iracane	1:07.95	$1,000,000	I
2002	Orientate	4	Jerry Bailey	D. Wayne Lukas	Bob & Beverly Lewis	1:08.89	$1,000,000	I
2001	Squirtle Squirt	3	Jerry Bailey	Robert J. Frankel	David J. Lanzman	1:08.41	$1,000,000	I
2000	Kona Gold	6	Alex Solis	Bruce Headley	Bruce Headley, Irwin Molasky, High Tech Stable	1:07.60	$1,000,000	I
1999	Artax	4	Jorge F. Chavez	Louis Albertrani	Paraneck Stable	1:07.80	$1,000,000	I
1998	Reraise	3	Corey Nakatani	Craig Dollase	B Fey, M Han, L. Opas, F. Sinatra & Class Racing Stable	1:09.00	$1,000,000	I
1997	Elmhurst	7	Corey Nakatani	Jenine Sahadi	Evergreen Farm & Sahadi	1:08.20	$1,000,000	I
1996	Lit de Justice	6	Corey Nakatani	Jenine Sahadi	Evergreen Farm	1:08.60	$1,000,000	I
1995	Desert Stormer	5	Kent Desormeaux	Frank Lyons	Joanne H. Nor	1:09.00	$1,000,000	I
1994	Cherokee Run	4	Mike E. Smith	Frank A. Alexander	Jill E. Robinson	1:09.40	$1,000,000	I
1993	Cardmania	7	Ed Delahoussaye	Derek Meredith	Jean Couvercelle	1:08.60	$1,000,000	I
1992	Thirty Slews	5	Eddie Delahoussaye	Bob Baffert	Dutch Masters III DeGroot & Micheal E. Pegram	1:08.20	$1,000,000	I
1991	Sheikh Albadou (GB)	3	Pat Eddery	Alex Scott	Hilal Salem	1:09.20	$1,000,000	I
1990	Safely Kept	4	Craig Perret	Alan E. Goldberg	Jayeff B Stable	1:09.60	$1,000,000	I
1989	Dancing Spree	4	Ángel Cordero Jr.	Claude R. McGaughey III	Ogden Phipps	1:09.00	$1,000,000	I
1988	Gulch	4	Ángel Cordero Jr.	D. Wayne Lukas	Peter M. Brant	1:10.40	$1,000,000	I
1987	Very Subtle	3	Pat Valenzuela	Melvin F. Stute	Ben Rochelle	1:08.80	$1,000,000	I
1986	Smile	4	Jacinto Vásquez	Scotty Schulhofer	Frances A. Genter	1:08.40	$1,000,000	I
1985	Precisionist	4	Chris McCarron	Ross Fenstermaker	Fred W. Hooper	1:08.40	$1,000,000	I
1984	Eillo	4	Craig Perret	Budd Lepman	Crown Stable	1:10.20	$1,000,000	I

== See also ==
- Breeders' Cup Sprint "top three finishers" and starters
- American thoroughbred racing top attended events
