= Oaklawn Racing Casino Resort =

American casino

Coordinates: 34.484999°N 93.057096°W

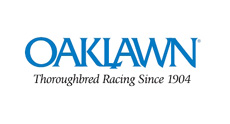

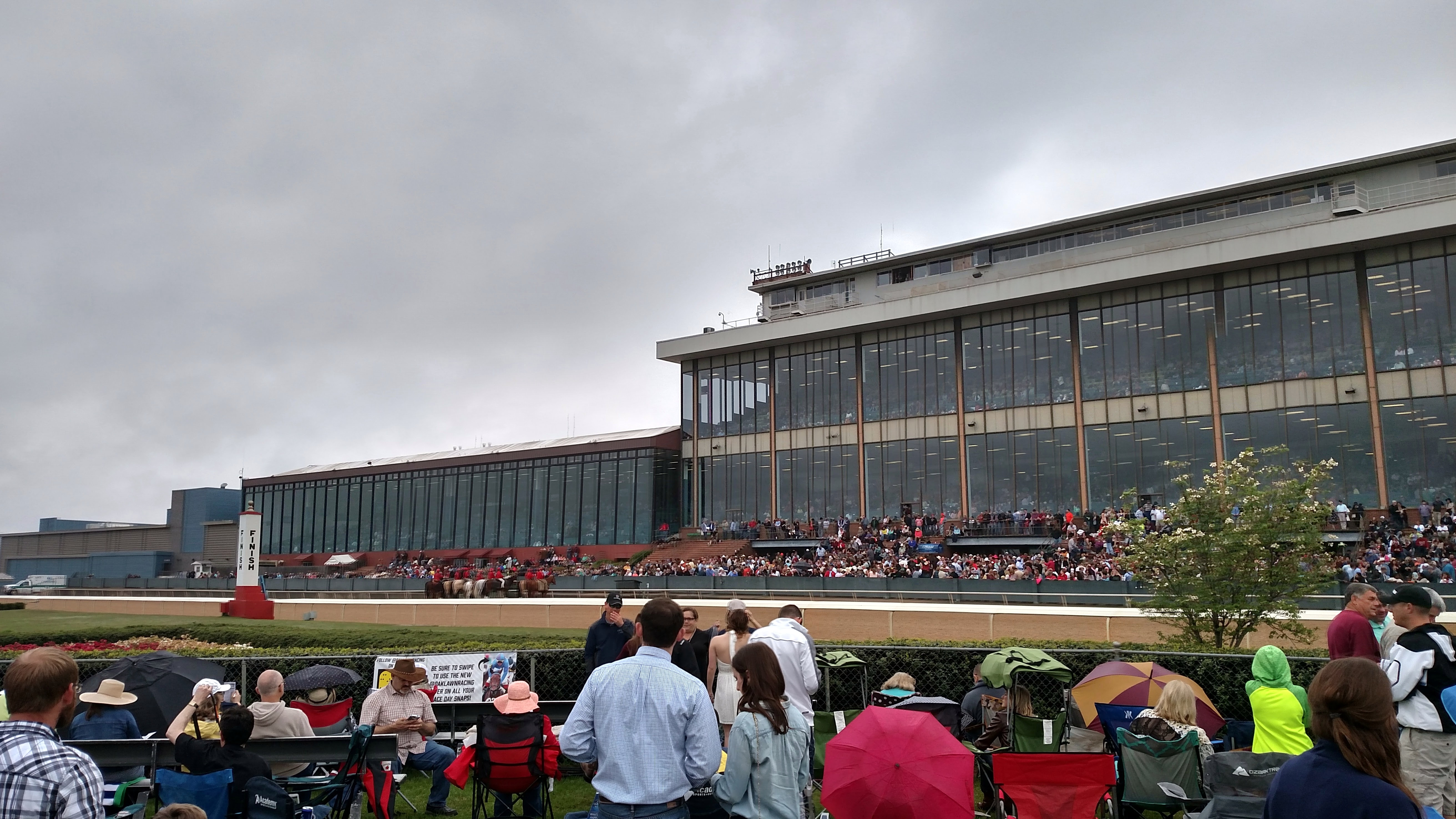
- View from infield
- Interactive map of Oaklawn Racing Casino Resort
- Location: 2705 Central Avenue; Hot Springs, Arkansas 71901; United States
- Owned by: Oaklawn Jockey Club, Inc. (Cella family)
- Date opened: 1904
- Race type: Thoroughbred
- Course type: Dirt
- Notable races: Apple Blossom Handicap (G1); Arkansas Derby (G1); Oaklawn Handicap (G2); Fantasy Stakes (G2); Rebel Stakes (G2); Azeri Stakes (G2); Southwest Stakes (G3); Razorback Handicap (G3); Count Fleet Sprint Handicap (G3)

Oaklawn Racing Casino Resort, formerly Oaklawn Park Race Track, is an American thoroughbred racetrack and casino in Hot Springs, Arkansas, United States. It is the home to "The Racing Festival of the South", a four-day series of races that concludes with the Arkansas Derby.

In 2017, Oaklawn was ranked fifth among thoroughbred racetracks in North America by the Horseplayers Association of North America.

In 2015, a pair of victories at Oaklawn put American Pharoah on the path to becoming American Horse of the Year and the first Triple Crown winner in 37 years.

== History ==
Oaklawn Park opened on February 24, 1904. The city declared a holiday to mark the occasion, and more than 3,000 people attended the first day of racing. In its early years, the track ran six races a day, similar to British cards.

In 1907, political problems in the state forced the closure of Oaklawn. Both original business partners had died, so the closed track was sold, to Louis Cella. The track reopened in 1916 under the auspices of the Business Men's League of Hot Springs.

In 1918, Cella died, and the track passed to his brother, Charles. For the next few years, the track was opened and closed periodically because of vagaries in the state's political climate. When it was dominated by conservatives, there were efforts to close down the track, which was believed to attract risqué people.

In 1929, during the Arkansas legislative session, a bill to allow horse racing and parimutuel betting came to a tie vote in the state House of Representatives. The only Republican member of the state House at the time, Osro Cobb of Montgomery County, had been out of the chamber when his name was called. Upon his return, Cobb cast the tie-breaking vote to allow racing and betting at the track.

In the 1930s, the track and "Spa" combined attracted many horse racing fans. In 1935, Oaklawn increased purses to become competitive with the best tracks across the country. The first Arkansas Derby was run in 1936 for a purse of $5,000. By this time, the track ran a 30-day race meeting. On October 29, 1940, Charles G. Cella died and the presidency of Oaklawn transferred to his son, John G. Cella (1909–1968). In 1941, purses again set Oaklawn records. By 1943, the Arkansas Derby had a purse of $10,000. Oaklawn stayed open in 1944, after most American tracks had closed because of World War II. It cancelled the spring season in 1945.

At the end of WWII, Oaklawn held a 30-day late-autumn-and-winter season; together with postwar exuberance and spending, it stimulated an unprecedented period of prosperity. This financed a major clubhouse renovation and a resurfacing of the track.

Throughout the 1950s, the track continued to climb in handle, attendance, and purses. In 1956, J. Sweeney Grant became manager of Oaklawn. In 1961, the track extended the season to 43 days. In 1962, the track notched the fifth-highest profit of North American tracks. By 1965, the Arkansas Derby was a $50,000 stakes that could attract top Kentucky Derby prospects. In 1968, Oaklawn president John G. Cella died suddenly and his son Charles J. Cella took over. Grant died in 1971, having led Oaklawn through 16 years of remarkable growth.

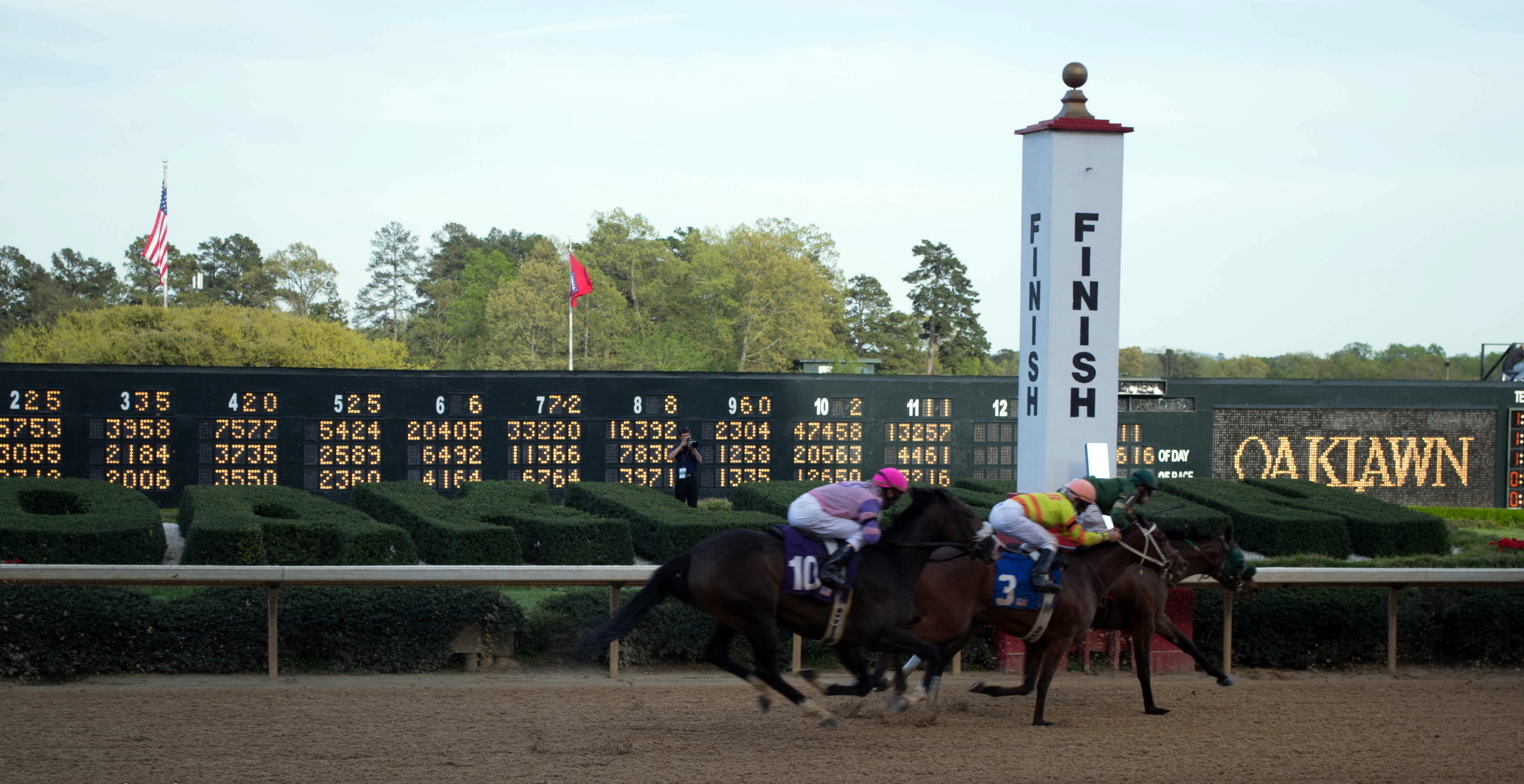
Finish line at the 2013 Arkansas Derby

W. T. Bishop replaced Grant and the track continued to thrive. In 1972, the Arkansas Derby became a $100,000 stakes. The following year was the first for the running of the Fantasy Stakes, a prep race to the Kentucky Oaks. The Racing Festival of the South was created in 1974. The week-long festival has one stakes race each day, leading up to the Arkansas Derby.

In 1975, Oaklawn completed a renovation that added a five-level glass enclosure to the north end of the grandstand, near the top of the stretch. The addition included a general admission area, a 400-person box and 2,500 reserved seats, a kitchen, dining room, and private club.

The 1983 racing season set Oaklawn's all-time handle record: $168,740,923 wagered during the 56-day season. This was a daily average of $3,013,230, beating the track's goal of $3 million. Attendance for the season was 1,303,223, for a daily average of 23,272. That same year, the purse for the Arkansas Derby was increased to $250,000.

In 1984, the purse was lifted to $500,000.

By 1985, three decades of prosperity began to reverse. Betting declined 8.1% and attendance declined by 3.7% compared to 1984. Increased competition from neighboring states, a lack of Sunday racing, and a lack of race days were blamed.

By 1990, the track was opened for races on Sundays, the grandstand had been enlarged, and attendance began to recover.

Two years later, races began timing in hundredths of seconds, rather than fifths, as with other race tracks around the world.

In 2004, to celebrate its 100th anniversary, Oaklawn Park offered a $5 million bonus to any horse that could sweep its three-year-old graded stakes, the Rebel Stakes and the Arkansas Derby, and also take the Kentucky Derby. Smarty Jones collected the bonus.

In 2015, eventual Triple Crown winner American Pharoah began his Eclipse award-winning season with victories at Oaklawn in the Rebel Stakes and Arkansas Derby.

Just before the 2018 season opened, Oaklawn unveiled a life-sized bronze sculpture of American Pharoah and jockey Victor Espinoza at the grandstand's redesigned entrance. The work, by Philadelphia sculptor James Peniston, had been commissioned two years earlier by Oaklawn president Charles Cella to memorialize the horse's victories at the Hot Springs track.

Later in 2018, Oaklawn announced that it would start its 2019 racing season a few weeks later than usual, running from late January until early May, lasting the customary 57 days and ending on the day of the Kentucky Derby. Among the reasons given for the change were spring weather conditions and January racing cancellations over the previous decade.

In 2021, the resort completed a $100 million expansion that enlarged the casino and added a hotel and event center. Since 2024, Oaklawn has been the state's only Forbes four-star spa.

== Physical attributes ==
Oaklawn's dirt track is one mile in circumference, with a chute in the backstretch permitting sprint races at 6 furlongs. Oaklawn, like a few other US racetracks, employs two finish lines. Since the distance from the main finish line to the start of the first turn is very short, races at one mile start and end at the 1/16th pole. This reduces the length of the stretch from the usual 1,155 feet to 825 feet.

The original clubhouse was designed by Chicago architect Zachary Taylor Davis in 1904, who would later design Chicago's Old Comiskey Park and Wrigley Field. The track buildings have undergone many renovations, and updated barns provide stabling for the horses.

In 2008, Oaklawn began a $3 million addition to accommodate casino-style slot machines, poker tables, and an Instant Racing complex. The casino addition made Oaklawn the largest gambling facility in the state of Arkansas.

== Casino ==
Until 2019, the state of Arkansas did not allow traditional slot machines. All games offered were "electronic games of skill," which was defined by section 10.17 of the Final Rules of the Arkansas Racing Commission Regulations for Franchise Holders Operating Electronic Games of skill as "game(s) played through any electronic device or machine that affords an opportunity for the exercise of skill or judgment where the outcome is not completely controlled by chance alone."

On April 1, 2019, Oaklawn became a full casino under Amendment 100 to the Constitution of Arkansas, approved by voters in 2018. It has since added live table games—blackjack, craps, roulette, and other games of chance—plus sports wagering and slot machines.

== Racing ==
Stakes races run at Oaklawn Park in 2019 during the Racing Festival of the South and the Oaklawn Park meet include:

Grade I

- Apple Blossom Handicap
- Arkansas Derby

Grade II

- Azeri Stakes
- Oaklawn Handicap
- Rebel Stakes

Grade III

- Count Fleet Sprint Handicap
- Bayakoa Stakes
- Essex Handicap
- Honeybee Stakes
- Oaklawn Mile Stakes
- Razorback Handicap
- Southwest Stakes
- Fantasy Stakes
- Whitmore Stakes

Non-graded stakes:

- Bachelor Stakes
- Carousel Stakes
- King Cotton Stakes
- Mountain Valley Stakes
- Smarty Jones Stakes
- Fifth Season Stakes

The track also runs numerous overnight handicaps and minor stakes during the Winter and Spring Meets.

== See also ==
- List of casinos in Arkansas
