= Breeders' Cup Turf Sprint top three finishers =

This is a listing of the horses that finished in either first, second, or third place and the number of starters in the Breeders' Cup Turf Sprint, run on grass as part of the Breeders' Cup World Thoroughbred Championships. The Turf Sprint was introduced in 2007 and became a Grade I race in 2009.

Year	Winner	Second	Third	Starters
2026	Bacio	Cy Fair	Starlust	14
2025	Shisospicy	Ag Bullet	Khaadem	13
2024	Starlust	Motorious	Ag Bullet	11
2023	Nobals	Big Invasion	Aesop's Fables	12
2022	Caravel	Emaraaty Ana	Creative Force	14
2021	Golden Pal	Lieutenant Dan	Charmaine's Mia	12
2020	Glass Slippers (GB)	Wet Your Whistle	Leinster	14
2019	Belvoir Bay	Om	Shekky Shebaz	12
2018	Stormy Liberal	World of Trouble	Disco Partner	14
2017	Stormy Liberal	Richard's Boy	Disco Partner	12
2016	Obviously	Om	Pure Sensation	14
2015	Mongolian Saturday	Lady Shipman	Green Mask	14
2014	Bobby's Kitten	No Nay Never	Undrafted	14
2013	Mizdirection (mare)	Reneesgotzip (filly)	Tightend Touchdown	14
2012	Mizdirection (filly)	Unbridled's Note	Reneesgotzip	14
2011	Regally Ready	Country Day	Perfect Officer	13
2010	Chamberlain Bridge	Central City	Unzip Me	14
2009	California Flag	Gotta Have Her	Cannonball	14
2008	Desert Code	Diabolical	Storm Treasure	14

Source: Equibase Charts
