= Las Cienegas Stakes =

- Class: Grade III
- Location: Santa Anita Park; Arcadia, California, United States
- Inaugurated: 1974 (as Las Cienegas Handicap)
- Race type: Thoroughbred - Flat racing
- Website: Santa Anita Park

Race information
- Distance: about 6 1/2 furlongs sprint
- Surface: Turf
- Track: left-handed
- Qualification: Fillies and mares, four-years-old and older
- Weight: 124 lbs. with allowances
- Purse: $100,000 (since 1998)

The Las Cienegas Stakes is a Grade III American thoroughbred horse race for fillies and mares age four and up over a distance of about six and one-half furlongs on the Hillside Turf Course held annually in January at Santa Anita Park in Arcadia, California, USA. The event currently offers a purse of US$100,000.

== History ==
The inaugural running of the event was on 17 February 1974 as the Las Cienegas Handicap, a sprint over the Downhill turf course over a distance of about 6 1/2 furlongs for horses that were four-years-old or older. The event was won by Woodland Pines who was ridden by US Hall of Fame jockey Donald Pierce in a time of 1:13 flat.

The following year the event was not held.

In 1976 the event was run with conditions for three-year-olds only on the dirt track over a distance of six furlongs. The event was won by Life's Hope who later that year would win the Grade 1 Jersey Derby. In 1977 the event was scheduled in April as with handicap conditions for fillies and mares age four and up over a distance of six and one-half furlongs on the Downhill turf course. The event continued to be scheduled usually in April until 2017 when it was moved to January.

The event was upgraded in 1992 by the American Graded Stakes Committee to Grade III race. In 2013 the event's conditions were changes to a stakes allowance race and the name modified to Las Cienegas Stakes.

The event has been moved to the dirt due to weather conditions in 1979, 1982, 1983, 1986, 2012, 2016, 2017 and 2019.

In 2012 the event was moved to the dirt track and was won by Mizdirection. Mizdirection later that year would return to Santa Anita and win the Breeders' Cup Turf Sprint. Mizdirection would repeat the unique double in 2013 again winning both events. Mizdirection is the only dual winner of the event.

Due to poor state of the Downhill turf course in 2020 and 2021 the event was held on the proper turf course at a shorter distance. On 11 January 2020, the Las Cienegas Stakes was run for the first time at a distance of 5 1/2 furlongs on turf. Brazilian import Jolie Olimpica, making her first start in the United States, set a new Santa Anita Park course record of 1:01 flat for that distance.

In the 2021 running of the event Charmaine's Mia set a new course record for the 6 furlong distance.

== Records ==
Speed record:

- about 6 1/2 furlongs on turf: 1:11.66 – Elusive Diva (2005)
- 6 1/2 furlongs on dirt: 1:14.40 – Excitable Lady (1982)

Margins:

- 8 1/2 lengths – Watch This Cat (2015)

Most wins:

- 2 - Mizdirection (2012, 2013)

Most wins by a jockey:

- 4 - Kent Desormeaux (1998, 2002, 2005, 2018)

Most wins by a trainer:

- 4 - Gary F. Jones (1981, 1987, 1992, 1996)
- 4 - Robert J. Frankel (1989, 2002, 2003, 2004)
- 4 - Richard E. Mandella (1997, 1999, 2016, 2020)

Most wins by an owner:

- 2 - Golden Eagle Farm (1992, 1997)
- 2 - Juddmonte Farms (2003, 2004)
- 2 - Jungle Racing and partners (2012, 2013)

== Winners ==
Year	Winner	Age	Jockey	Trainer	Owner	Distance	Time	Purse	Grade	Ref
Las Cienegas Stakes
2026	Queen Maxima	5	Juan J. Hernandez	Jeff Mullins	Dutch Girl Holdings & Irving Ventures	abt. 6 1/2 furlongs	1:11.69	$102,000	III	
2025	Toupie	4	Flavien Prat	H. Graham Motion	Wertheimer et Frère	abt. 6 1/2 furlongs	1:12.97	$101,500	III	
2024	Honey Pants	6	Frankie Dettori	Philip D'Amato	Bakster Farm & Gerald Isbister	abt. 6 1/2 furlongs	1:12.40	$103,000	III	
2023	Amy C (GB)	5	Umberto Rispoli	Philip D'Amato	Madaket Stables, Michael Dubb & Robert V. LaPenta	abt. 6 1/2 furlongs	1:12.76	$101,500	III	
2022	Zero Tolerance	4	Flavien Prat	Ruben Alvarado	Custom Truck Accessories, Jason Hall, Joe Kelly & Michael Riordan	abt. 6 1/2 furlongs	1:13.26	$101,000	III	
2021	Charmaine's Mia	4	Drayden Van Dyke	Philip D'Amato	Agave Racing Stable	6 furlongs	1:07.81	$99,000	III	
2020	Jolie Olimpica (BRZ)	4	Mike E. Smith	Richard E. Mandella	Fox Hill Farms	5 1/2 furlongs	1:01.00	$100,000	III	
2019	Belvoir Bay (GB)	6	Flavien Prat	Peter L. Miller	Gary Barber	6 1/2 furlongs	1:15.06	$98,000	Listed	Off turf
2018	Coniah	5	Kent J. Desormeaux	William E. Morey	James W. & Tammy M. McKenney	abt. 6 1/2 furlongs	1:12.17	$100,690	III	
2017	Watch This Cat	5	Corey Nakatani	Richard Baltas	Harry Bederian, Harout Kamberian & Hagop Nakkashian	6 1/2 furlongs	1:16.41	$98,000	Listed	Off turf
2016	Dreamologist	4	Flavien Prat	Richard E. Mandella	LNJ Foxwoods	6 1/2 furlongs	1:15.56	$100,690	III	Off turf
2015	Home Journey	5	Rafael Bejarano	Mike Puype	GGG Stables & Russell J. Sarno	abt. 6 1/2 furlongs	1:13.09	$100,750	III	
2014	Tribal Spy	4	Joseph Talamo	Adam Kitchingman	Triple B Farms	abt. 6 1/2 furlongs	1:12.12	$100,500	III	
2013	Mizdirection	5	David R. Flores	Mike Puype	Jungle Racing, Danny Grohs, William Strauss, Borris Beljak, KMN Racing et al.	abt. 6 1/2 furlongs	1:12.61	$100,000	III	
Las Cienegas Handicap
2012	Mizdirection	4	David R. Flores	Mike Puype	Jungle Racing, William Strauss, Danny Gohs, Borris Beljak, & Kevin Nish	6 1/2 furlongs	1:16.50	$98,000	Listed	Off turf
2011	Separate Forest	4	Pat Valenzuela	Doug F. O'Neill	Suarez Racing, Westside Rentals.com & Darin Tsukashima	abt. 6 1/2 furlongs	1:12.64	$100,000	III	
2010	Unzip Me	4	Joseph Talamo	Martin F. Jones	Harris Farms, Per Antonsen, Marin Jones & Donald Valpredo	abt. 6 1/2 furlongs	1:12.80	$100,000	III	
2009	Gotta Have Her	5	Tyler Baze	Jenine Sahadi	Green Lantern Stables	abt. 6 1/2 furlongs	1:11.92	$100,000	III	
2008	† Lightmyfirebaby	5	Alex O. Solis	Barry Abrams	Richard O'Neill Trust	abt. 6 1/2 furlongs	1:13.25	$112,700	III	
2007	River's Prayer	4	Clinton L. Potts	Paula S. Capestro	Bantry Farms, Paula Capestro & Martin Racing Stable	abt. 6 1/2 furlongs	1:12.99	$108,700	III	
2006	Cambiocorsa	4	Jon Court	Doug F. O'Neill	Leatherman Racing & Ran Jan Racing	abt. 6 1/2 furlongs	1:12.60	$112,900	III	
2005	Elusive Diva	4	Pat Valenzuela	Mark Glatt	Allen & Susan Branch, John Konecny et al.	abt. 6 1/2 furlongs	1:11.66	$111,100	III	
2004	Etoile Montante	4	Javier Santiago	Robert J. Frankel	Juddmonte Farms	abt. 6 1/2 furlongs	1:13.32	$112,800	III	
2003	Heat Haze (GB)	4	Jose Valdivia Jr.	Robert J. Frankel	Juddmonte Farms	abt. 6 1/2 furlongs	1:13.11	$110,000	III	
2002	Rolly Polly (IRE)	4	Kent J. Desormeaux	Robert J. Frankel	Wildenstein Stable	abt. 6 1/2 furlongs	1:12.55	$108,500	III	
2001	Go Go	4	Eddie Delahoussaye	Warren Stute	Alan B. & Paula Thomas	abt. 6 1/2 furlongs	1:13.54	$109,500	III	
2000	Evening Promise (GB)	4	Danny Sorenson	Kathy Walsh	Richard Duggan & James R. Vreeland	abt. 6 1/2 furlongs	1:13.66	$106,400	III	
1999	§ Desert Lady (IRE)	4	Corey Nakatani	Richard E. Mandella	The Thoroughbred Corporation	abt. 6 1/2 furlongs	1:13.65	$109,400	III	
1998	Dance Parade	4	Kent J. Desormeaux	Neil D. Drysdale	H.R.H. Prince Fahd bin Salman	abt. 6 1/2 furlongs	1:13.60	$108,000	III	
1997	Advancing Star	4	Gary L. Stevens	Richard E. Mandella	Golden Eagle Farm	abt. 6 1/2 furlongs	1:12.50	$156,550	III	
1996	Ski Dancer	4	Gary L. Stevens	Gary F. Jones	Kallenberg Thoroughbreds	abt. 6 1/2 furlongs	1:14.59	$104,300	III	
1995	Marina Park (GB)	5	Alex O. Solis	Ian P. D. Jory	Greenland Park	abt. 6 1/2 furlongs	1:13.77	$103,175	III	
1994	Mamselle Bebette	4	Chris McCarron	Jack Van Berg	Big Train Farm	abt. 6 1/2 furlongs	1:13.05	$87,225	III	
1993	Glen Kate (IRE)	6	Corey Black	Bill Shoemaker	Wayne Gretzky & Bruce McNall	abt. 6 1/2 furlongs	1:12.71	$104,350	III	
1992	Heart of Joy	5	Chris McCarron	Gary F. Jones	Golden Eagle Farm	abt. 6 1/2 furlongs	1:12.72	$103,475	III	
1991	Flower Girl (GB)	4	Eddie Delahoussaye	Hector O. Palma	William J. Gredley	abt. 6 1/2 furlongs	1:13.20	$83,400	Listed	
1990	Stylish Star	4	Chris McCarron	Dan L. Hendricks	Mr. & Mrs. Thomas Cavanagh	abt. 6 1/2 furlongs	1:13.00	$80,850		
1989	Imperial Star (GB)	5	Robbie Davis	Robert J. Frankel	Robert B. Trussel Jr.	6 1/2 furlongs	1:15.60	$84,200		
1988	Hairless Heiress	5	Gary L. Stevens	Noble Threewitt	Jawl Brothers	6 1/2 furlongs	1:15.00	$85,500		
1987	Lichi (CHI)	7	Gary Baze	Gary F. Jones	Preston Farm	6 1/2 furlongs	1:14.40	$65,150		
1986	Shywing	4	Laffit Pincay Jr.	Jerry M. Fanning	Cardiff Stud Farm	6 1/2 furlongs	1:18.00	$64,550		Off turf
1985	Danzadar	4	Dario A. Lozoya	Hector O. Palma	Granja Vista Del Rio Stable	6 1/2 furlongs	1:14.00	$64,250		
1984	Tangent (NZ)	4	Gustavo Barrera	Wayne Murty	Bacchus, Harrison, McGee, Murty Farm & Stewart	6 1/2 furlongs	1:15.00	$66,600		
1983	Faneuil Lass	4	Laffit Pincay Jr.	D. Wayne Lukas	Sam E. Stevens	6 1/2 furlongs	1:17.40	$68,200		Off turf
1982	Excitable Lady	4	Eddie Delahoussaye	Ron McAnally	Thomas E. Gentry	6 1/2 furlongs	1:14.40	$67,650		Off turf
1981	Wishing Well	6	Fernando Toro	Gary F. Jones	Mr. & Mrs. Michael Lima	6 1/2 furlongs	1:13.40	$56,750		
1980	Great Lady M.	5	Pat Valenzuela	D. Wayne Lukas	Robert H. Spreen	6 1/2 furlongs	1:14.80	$46,100		
1979	Pressing Date	5	Angel Cordero Jr.	William J. Hirsch Jr.	King Ranch	6 1/2 furlongs	1:16.40	$45,500		Off turf
1978	Drama Critic	4	Darrel G. McHargue	Ron McAnally	Elmendorf	6 1/2 furlongs	1:14.00	$45,800		
1977	Dancing Femme	4	Bill Shoemaker	A. Thomas Doyle	Jack L. Finley	6 1/2 furlongs	1:13.60	$42,600		
1976	Life's Hope	3	Laffit Pincay Jr.	Laz Barrera	Harbor View Farm	6 furlongs	1:09.40	$34,500		3YOs
1975	Race not held									
1974	Woodland Pines	5	Donald Pierce	Cecil Jolly	Linda Briggs Smith	6 1/2 furlongs	1:13.00	$29,900		

Legend:
Dirt Turf

Notes:
§ Ran as an entry
† In 2002, Bahama Mama (IRE) won the race but was disqualified and place fourth after stewards ruled she had drifted in the straight. Lightmyfirebaby was declared the winner, Wake Up Maggie (IRE) moved to second and Super Freaky to third.

== See also ==
List of American and Canadian Graded races
