= Eddie D Stakes =

Eddie Delahoussaye Stakes
- Class: Grade II
- Location: Santa Anita Park; Arcadia, California, United States
- Inaugurated: 1974 (as Morvich Handicap)
- Race type: Thoroughbred – Flat racing
- Website: Santa Anita

Race information
- Distance: about 6 1/2 furlongs
- Surface: Turf
- Track: Left-handed
- Qualification: Three-year-olds & older
- Weight: Base weights with allowances: 4-year-olds and up: 126 lbs. 3-year-olds: 122 lbs.
- Purse: $200,000

The Eddie Delahoussaye Stakes (often shortened to the "Eddie D") is a Grade II American Thoroughbred horse race for horses aged three years old or older over the distance of about 6 1/2 furlongs on the Downhill Turf course scheduled annually in late September or early October at Santa Anita Park in Arcadia, California. The event currently carries a purse of $200,000.

== History ==
The event was inaugurated on 30 October 1974 as the Morvich Handicap at the Oak Tree Racing Association meeting at Santa Anita Park as the eighth race on the racecard over a distance of 6 1/2 furlongs on the dirt.

The event was named for Morvich, an American Champion Two-Year-Old Colt who in 1922 became the first California-bred racehorse to win the Kentucky Derby.

The following year the event scheduled for the Downhill Turf course at the distance of about 6 1/2 furlongs.

In 1999 the event was classified as Grade III

In 2010 the Oak Tree Racing Association meeting was held at Hollywood Park Racetrack and the race was shortened to six furlongs.

In 2012, the Morvich Handicap was renamed to the Eddie Delahoussaye Stakes (often shortened to just "Eddie D") in honor of the US Hall of Fame jockey. Eddie Delahoussaye rode the Tsunami Slew to victory in 1984 running of the event.

The event was upgraded to Grade II for the 2019 running. Also that year the event run at the shorter five furlong distance with Santa Anita Administration not holding events on the Downhill Turf course. The event returned back to the Downhill Turf course in 2021.

== Records ==
Speed record:

- 5 furlongs: 0:55.33 – Pee Wee Reese (2019)
- abt. 6 1/2 furlongs: 1:10.93 – Stormy Liberal (2018)

Margins:

- 8 lengths – Western Approach (1993)

Most wins:

- 3 – California Flag (2008, 2009, 2011)

Most wins by an owner:

- 3 – Hi Card Ranch (2008, 2009, 2011)

Most wins by a jockey:

- 4 – Kent J. Desormeaux (1991, 1993, 1996, 2005)

Most wins by a trainer:

- 6 – Robert J. Frankel (1977, 1978, 1986, 1993, 1999, 2004)

== Winners ==
Year	Winner	Age	Jockey	Trainer	Owner	Distance	Time	Purse	Grade	Ref
At Santa Anita Park – Eddie D Stakes
2026	Sorrento Sky (IRE)	5	Umberto Rispoli	Philip D'Amato	Benowitz Family Trust, CYBT, McLean Racing Stables, Saul Gevertz, Marc Lantzman and Michael Nentwing	abt. 6 1/2 furlongs	1:12.30	$200,000	II	
2025	Reef Runner	4	Armando Ayuso	David Fawkes	Alex & JoAnn Lieblong	abt. 6 1/2 furlongs	1:11.65	$201,500	II	
At Santa Anita Park – California Crown Eddie D Stakes
2024	First Peace	4	Mike E. Smith	Mark Glatt	Rancho Temescal, Red Baron's Barn & Rodney E. Orr	abt. 6 1/2 furlongs	1:11.56	$753,000	II	
At Santa Anita Park – Eddie D Stakes
2023	Lane Way	6	Mike E. Smith	Richard E. Mandella	MyRacehorse	abt. 6 1/2 furlongs	1:14.47	$203,000	II	
2022	Whatmakessammyrun	4	Joe Bravo	Mark Glatt	Sterling Racing	abt. 6 1/2 furlongs	1:11.74	$202,000	II	
2021	Lieutenant Dan	5	Geovanni Franco	Steven Miyadi	Nicholas B. Alexander	abt. 6 1/2 furlongs	1:11.74	$202,000	II	
2020	Big Runnuer	5	Juan J. Hernandez	Victor L. Garcia	Juan J. Garcia	5 1/2 furlongs	1:01.15	$201,000	II	
2019	Pee Wee Reese	6	Flavien Prat	Philip D'Amato	Nicholas B. Alexander	5 furlongs	0:55.33	$201,053	II	
2018	Stormy Liberal	6	Drayden Van Dyke	Peter L. Miller	Rockingham Ranch & David A. Bernsen	abt. 6 1/2 furlongs	1:10.93	$101,380	III	
2017	Mr. Roary	4	Tyler Conner	George Papaprodromou	Kretz Racing	abt. 6 1/2 furlongs	1:11.99	$101,725	III	
2016	Ambitious Brew	6	Mike E. Smith	Martin F. Jones	Pamela C. Ziebarth	abt. 6 1/2 furlongs	1:11.57	$101,725	III	Division 1
2016	Holy Lute	6	Jamie Theriot	James M. Cassidy	Class Racing Stable	abt. 6 1/2 furlongs	1:11.23	$102,070	III	Division 2
2015	No Silent	6	Gary L. Stevens	Gary Mandella	Double JH Stable	abt. 6 1/2 furlongs	1:13.04	$101,500	III	
2014	Home Run Kitten	3	Joseph Talamo	David E. Hofmans	Tarabilla Farms	abt. 6 1/2 furlongs	1:11.94	$101,500	III	
2013	Chips All In	4	Julien R. Leparoux	Jeff Mullins	Jean Everest, John O'Brien, Danny Valdez & Michelle Turpin	abt. 6 1/2 furlongs	1:12.00	$101,750	III	
2012	Unbridled's Note	3	Corey Nakatani	Steven M. Asmussen	Mike McCarty	abt. 6 1/2 furlongs	1:12.45	$100,000	III	
Morvich Stakes
2011	California Flag	7	Pat Valenzuela	Brian J. Koriner	Hi Card Ranch	abt. 6 1/2 furlongs	1:11.91	$100,000	III	
At Hollywood Park – Morvich Handicap
2010	Quick Enough	6	Pat Valenzuela	Doug F. O'Neill	Michael Bello, Russell Sarno & Suarez Racing	6 furlongs	1:08.42	$100,000	III	
At Santa Anita Park – Morvich Handicap
2009	California Flag	5	Joseph Talamo	Brian J. Koriner	Hi Card Ranch	abt. 6 1/2 furlongs	1:11.40	$100,000	III	
2008	California Flag	4	Joseph Talamo	Brian J. Koriner	Hi Card Ranch	abt. 6 1/2 furlongs	1:11.10	$112,500	III	
2007	Get Funky	4	Martin Garcia	John W. Sadler	Keith Abrahams	abt. 6 1/2 furlongs	1:13.23	$110,000	III	
2006	Moth Ball (GB)	4	Michael Baze	James M. Cassidy	James M. Cassidy & Deron Pearson	abt. 6 1/2 furlongs	1:11.61	$100,000	III	
2005	Geronimo (CHI)	6	Kent J. Desormeaux	John W. Sadler	Gary & Cecil Barber	abt. 6 1/2 furlongs	1:12.10	$100,000	III	
2004	Leroidesanimaux (BRZ)	4	Jon Court	Robert J. Frankel	TNT Stud	abt. 6 1/2 furlongs	1:11.76	$100,000	III	
2003	King Robyn	3	Alex O. Solis	Jeff Mullins	Cornejo Racing	abt. 6 1/2 furlongs	1:13.22	$110,800	III	
2002	Master Belt (NZ)	4	Tyler Baze	Simon Bray	Thomas R. Hamilton	abt. 6 1/2 furlongs	1:12.26	$111,700	III	
2001	El Cielo	7	Jose Valdivia Jr.	Craig Dollase	Larry Carr, Miller Trust, D. & P. Webber Trust, et al.	abt. 6 1/2 furlongs	1:11.46	$107,800	III,	
2000	El Cielo	6	Jose Valdivia Jr.	Craig Dollase	Larry Carr, Miller Trust, D. & P. Webber Trust, et al.	abt. 6 1/2 furlongs	1:12.00	$111,700	III	
1999	†§ Riviera (FR)	5	Brice Blanc	Robert J. Frankel	Edmund A. Gann	abt. 6 1/2 furlongs	1:12.99	$111,400	III	
1998	Musafi	4	Garrett K. Gomez	Darrell Vienna	Red Baron's Barn	abt. 6 1/2 furlongs	1:14.54	$100,000	Listed	
1997	Reality Road	5	Corey Nakatani	Wallace Dollase	Peter J. & Dorothy Pelegrino	abt. 6 1/2 furlongs	1:13.60	$100,000	Listed	
1996	Comininalittlehot	5	Kent J. Desormeaux	Mike R. Mitchell	Gary W. & Timothy R. Burke	abt. 6 1/2 furlongs	1:11.57	$105,100	Listed	
1995	Score Quick	3	Goncalino Almeida	Melvin F. Stute	Bill M. Thomas	6 1/2 furlongs	1:14.64	$105,700	Listed	Off turf
1994	Rotsaluck	3	Fernando H. Valenzuela	Vladimir Cerin	Loyal E. Crownover	abt. 6 1/2 furlongs	1:13.66	$81,675	Listed	
1993	ƒ Western Approach	4	Kent J. Desormeaux	Robert J. Frankel	Juddmonte Farms	abt. 6 1/2 furlongs	1:12.12	$80,775	Listed	
1992	Regal Groom	5	Martin A. Pedroza	Caesar F. Dominguez	Emilio & Joe Estrada	6 1/2 furlongs	1:16.88	$77,125	Listed	Off turf
1991	Waterscape	5	Kent J. Desormeaux	Scott Henry	John & Yong H. Alpeza	abt. 6 1/2 furlongs	1:11.95	$81,000	Listed	
1990	Yes I'm Blue	4	David R. Flores	Vladimir Cerin	King, Landsburg, Powell, et al.	abt. 6 1/2 furlongs	1:12.40	$83,100		
1989	Basic Rate	4	Rafael Q. Meza	Neil French	Robert & Bonnie Walker	abt. 6 1/2 furlongs	1:12.20	$85,875		
1988	Dr. Brent	3	Fernando Toro	Morris Soriano	Braverman & Colvin	abt. 6 1/2 furlongs	1:15.80	$85,100		
1987	Sabona	5	Chris McCarron	John Gosden	Sir Earnest Harrison	abt. 6 1/2 furlongs	1:14.80	$65,900		
1986	River Drummer	4	Gary L. Stevens	Robert J. Frankel	Stavros Niarchos	abt. 6 1/2 furlongs	1:13.80	$114,700		
1985	Dear Rick	4	Chris McCarron	Jack Van Berg	John A. Franks	abt. 6 1/2 furlongs	1:14.20	$65,650		
1984	Tsunami Slew	3	Eddie Delahoussaye	Edwin J. Gregson	Royal Lines (Lessee)	abt. 6 1/2 furlongs	1:14.00	$66,000		
1983	Kangroo Court	6	Joseph J. Steiner	Johnny Longden	Johnny Longden	6 1/2 furlongs	1:16.00	$65,350		Off turf
1982	Shanekite	4	Sandy Hawley	Dale Landers	Selma Udko	abt. 6 1/2 furlongs	1:12.80	$65,050		
1981	Forlion	5	Marco Castaneda	Charles E. Whittingham	Seymour W. Brown	abt. 6 1/2 furlongs	1:13.80	$55,300		
1980	To B. Or Not	4	Marco Castaneda	Ronald W. Ellis	Bohm Stables	abt. 6 1/2 furlongs	1:13.80	$54,700		
1979	Arachnoid	6	Donald Pierce	D. Wayne Lukas	Tartan Stable	abt. 6 1/2 furlongs	1:12.60	$43,150		
1978	Impressive Luck	5	Fernando Toro	Robert J. Frankel	Albert Katz	abt. 6 1/2 furlongs	1:13.20	$43,250		
1977	Impressive Luck	4	Fernando Toro	Robert J. Frankel	Albert Katz	abt. 6 1/2 furlongs	1:13.60	$33,450		
1976	Cherry River	6	Laffit Pincay Jr.	Douglas Oliver	Stanley E. & Douglas Oliver	abt. 6 1/2 furlongs	1:13.40	$33,900		
1975	Century's Envoy	4	Jerry Lambert	Jerry Dutton	Mr. & Mrs. John J. Elmore	abt. 6 1/2 furlongs	1:13.40	$27,150		
1974	Palladium	5	Álvaro Pineda	David Hofmans	Pearson's Barn	6 1/2 furlongs	1:16.20	$27,050		

Legend:
Dirt Turf
Notes:
§ Ran as an entry
ƒ Filly or Mare
† In the 1999 running Kahal (GB) was first past the post but was disqualified and placed second for drifting in the straight and brushing Riviera (FR).

== See also ==
List of American and Canadian Graded races
