= Joe Hernandez Stakes =

- Class: Grade III
- Location: Santa Anita Park; Arcadia, California, United States
- Inaugurated: 2008
- Race type: Thoroughbred - Flat racing
- Website: www.santaanita.com

Race information
- Distance: about 6 1/2 furlongs
- Surface: Turf
- Track: Left-handed (Downhill)
- Qualification: Four-year-olds & up
- Weight: 124 lbs with allowances
- Purse: $250,000 (2022)

The Joe Hernandez Stakes is a Grade III American Thoroughbred horse race for horses aged four years old or older over the distance of 6 1/2 furlongs on the turf scheduled annually in January at Santa Anita Park in Arcadia, California. The event currently carries a purse of $250,000.

== History ==
Inaugurated in 2008, the race is named in honor of Joe Hernandez, the race caller at Santa Anita Park from the time the track opened on Christmas Day 1934 until his death in 1972. Hernandez called 15,587 races in a row at Santa Anita during that time.

The event was predominantly raced on the downhill turf course over the about 6 1/2 furlongs distance. In 2010 the event was moved to the synthetic All Weather track due to weather. The 2015 running was also moved off the turf but by then Santa Anita Park had restored the natural dirt track.

In 2019 the event was upgraded to Grade III and a year later to Grade II.

In 2020 the event was moved and run using the backstretch start at a distance of 5 1/2 furlongs on turf, and the following year the event was run on the newly extended backstretch and close to the former distance of 6 1/2 furlongs.

The 2017 winner Stormy Liberal followed up winning the Breeders' Cup Turf Sprint and repeating that effort in 2018.

The event was run twice in the calendar year in 2022 due to scheduling changes.

== Records ==
Speed record:

- about 6 1/2 furlongs – 1:10.88 – Gas Me Up (2025)

Margins:

- 4 1/4 lengths – Distinctiv Passion (2015)

Most wins by a jockey

- 3 – Joel Rosario (2009, 2012, 2021)
- 3 – Joseph Talamo (2014, 2018, 2019)

Most wins by a trainer

- 3 – Peter L. Miller (2017, 2020, 2021)

== Winners ==
| Year | Winner | Age | Jockey | Trainer | Owner | Distance | Time | Purse | Grade | Ref |
|---|---|---|---|---|---|---|---|---|---|---|
Joe Hernandez Stakes
| 2025 | Gas Me Up | 5 | Mirco Demuro | Peter Eurton | Exline-Border Racing, Michael Jawl, Aaron Kennedy & Tom Zwiesler | abt. 6 1/2 furlongs | 1:10.88 | $202,500 | II | |
| 2024 | Motorious | 6 | Antonio Fresu | Philip D'Amato | Anthony Fanticola | abt. 6 1/2 furlongs | 1:11.86 | $201,500 | II | |
| 2023 | Forbidden Kingdom | 4 | Flavien Prat | Richard Mandella | MyRacehorse & Spendthrift Farm | 6 1/2 furlongs | 1:14.92 | $203,500 | II | |
| 2022 (Dec) | Air Force Red | 4 | Juan Hernandez | Leonard Powell | Eclipse Thoroughbred Partners & Holly Golightly | abt. 6 1/2 furlongs | 1:11.53 | $252,500 | II | |
| 2022 (Jan) | Chewing Gum | 6 | Umberto Rispoli | William I. Mott | Pantofel Stable, Wachtel Stable & Jerold Zaro | 6 1/2 furlongs | 1:15.47 | $251,000 | II | |
| 2021 | Hembree | 7 | Joel Rosario | Peter L. Miller | Tom Kagele | 6 1/2 furlongs | 1:13.80 | $201,000 | II | |
| 2020 | Texas Wedge | 5 | Flavien Prat | Peter L. Miller | Altamira Racing Stable, Rafter JR Ranch, STD Racing Stable & A. Miller | 5 1/2 furlongs | 1:02.47 | $202,500 | II | |
| 2019 | Caribou Club | 5 | Joseph Talamo | Thomas F. Proctor | Glen Hill Farm | abt. 6 1/2 furlongs | 1:11.66 | $101,053 | III | |
| 2018 | Pee Wee Reese | 5 | Joseph Talamo | Philip D'Amato | Nicholas B. Alexander | abt. 6 1/2 furlongs | 1:12.37 | $98,375 | Listed | |
| 2017 | Stormy Liberal | 5 | Norberto Arroyo Jr. | Peter L. Miller | Rockingham Ranch | abt. 6 1/2 furlongs | 1:11.89 | $80,035 | Listed | |
| 2016 | Guns Loaded | 5 | Santiago Gonzalez | Doug F. O'Neill | Westside Rentals.com, Neil Haymes, Leo Rodriguez & Steve Rothblum | abt. 6 1/2 furlongs | 1:12.60 | $79,190 | Listed | |
| 2015 | Distinctiv Passion | 5 | Edwin A. Maldonado | Jeffrey L. Bonde | Edward J. Brown Jr., Alan Klein & Phillip Lebherz | 6 1/2 furlongs | 1:14.33 | $74,284 | | |
| 2014 | Sweet Swap | 5 | Joseph Talamo | John W. Sadler | Hronis Racing | abt. 6 1/2 furlongs | 1:12.28 | $76,900 | | |
Joe Hernandez Handicap
| 2013 | Unbridled's Note | 4 | Corey Nakatani | Steven M. Asmussen | Mike McCarty | abt. 6 1/2 furlongs | 1:11.17 | $76,900 | | |
| 2012 | Mr Gruff | 8 | Joel Rosario | Ronald W. Ellis | Gary Broad | abt. 6 1/2 furlongs | 1:12.06 | $79,880 | | |
Joe Hernandez Stakes
| 2011 | Regally Ready | 4 | Corey Nakatani | Steven M. Asmussen | Vinery Stables | abt. 6 1/2 furlongs | 1:12.98 | $79,150 | Listed | |
| 2010 | Sangaree | 5 | Martin Garcia | Bob Baffert | Darley Stable | 6 1/2 furlongs | 1:15.28 | $60,350 | | |
| 2009 | Noble Court | 5 | Joel Rosario | John W. Sadler | Joy Ride Racing | abt. 6 1/2 furlongs | 1:12.16 | $71,300 | | |
| 2008 | Desert Code | 4 | Richard Migliore | David E. Hofmans | Tarabilla Farms | abt. 6 1/2 furlongs | 1:12.36 | $76,850 | Listed | |

Legend:
Turf All Weather Track Dirt
