= Green flash (disambiguation) =

A green flash is an optical phenomenon.

Green flash may also refer to:

- Green Flash (film), a 2008 comedy-drama
- "Green Flash" (song), by the Japanese idol group AKB48
- Green Flash Brewing Company, a brewery in California, U.S.
- Green Flash Handicap, an American horse race
