= California Flag =

American-bred Thoroughbred racehorse

- Sire: Avenue of Flags
- Grandsire: Seattle Slew
- Dam: Ultrafleet
- Damsire: Afleet
- Sex: Gelding
- Foaled: February 14, 2004
- Died: January 2026 (aged 22)
- Country: United States
- Colour: Gray
- Breeder: Hi Card Ranch
- Owner: Hi Card Ranch
- Trainer: Brian Koriner
- Record: 27: 11-0-2
- Earnings: US$1,288,825

Major wins
- Morvich Handicap (2008, 2009, 2011); Hollywood Turf Express Handicap (2008); Green Flash Handicap (2009, 2010); San Simeon Handicap (2012); Breeders' Cup wins: Breeders' Cup Turf Sprint (2009)

Awards
- Co-California Horse of the Year (2009)

Honours
- California Flag Handicap (2013—)
- Last updated on 7 June 2026

California Flag was a thoroughbred racehorse foaled at Hi Card Ranch on February 19, 2004. He was sired by Avenue of Flags, a son of Seattle Slew, out of the Afleet (a son of Mr. Prospector) mare Ultrafleet.

He was best known for setting a new turf course record in 2008 in the Morvich Handicap and being the only horse to win this race three times: 2008, 2009 and 2011. On November 7, 2009, he got the most important win of his career beating Gotta Have Her in the Breeders' Cup Turf Sprint. California Flag then went to Hong Kong where he finished fifth in the Hong Kong Sprint. He then traveled to Dubai to contest in the new Al Quoz Sprint and was third after just getting overtaken at the wire.

California Flag shared 2009 California Horse of the Year honors with Dancing in Silks. In addition, the California Flag Handicap, a non-Listed Black type race for California-bred and sired horses named in California Flag's honor, is held every October at Santa Anita Park.

Post-retirement, California Flag lived at Peacefield Farm in Temecula, California until he passed away in January 2026 at the age of 22. This was stated to be due to old age.

== Racing form ==
Date	Race	Grade	Distance	Track	Odds	Field	Finish	Winning Time	Margin	Jockey	Winner (2nd Place)	Ref.
2007 – Three-year-old season
Apr 15	Maiden Special Weight		6.5 furlongs	Santa Anita	5.9	12	5th	1:13.64	2 1/2 lengths	Joseph Talamo	Asteri	
May 6	Maiden Special Weight		6 furlongs	Hollywood Park	1.0	8	3rd	1:08.99	3 lengths	Joseph Talamo	Tenga Cat	
June 2	Maiden Special Weight		6 furlongs	Hollywood Park	3.4	14	12th	1:10.87	10 1/2 lengths	Victor Espinoza	Johnny Eves	
2008 – Four-year-old season
Feb 11	Maiden Special Weight		1 mile	Santa Anita	17.9	11	1st	1:34.59	2 lengths	Joseph Talamo	(Kalookan Boss)	
Mar 28	Allowance		1 mile	Santa Anita	3.8	8	7th	1:34.28	11 lengths	Martin Garcia	Sassou	
Apr 27	Barretts Stakes		7 furlongs	Hollywood Park	48.9	14	7th	1:21.88	2 3/4 lengths	Joseph Talamo	Bestdressed	
May 17	Allowance		6 furlongs	Hollywood Park	7.8	11	10th	1:08.95	11 lengths	Victor Espinoza	Quick Enough	
Jul 2	Allowance		6 furlongs	Hollywood Park	5.7	7	1st	1:08.50	2 lengths	Joseph Talamo	(Partywithlarryz)	
Jul 24	Allowance		1 mile	Del Mar	3.2	10	6th	1:33.50	3 1/4 lengths	Joseph Talamo	Swift Winds	
Aug 8	Allowance Optional Claiming		5 furlongs	Del Mar	1.4	8	1st	0:55.98	Neck	Joseph Talamo	(Shadow of Illinois)	
Sep 24	Morvich Handicap	G3	6.5 furlongs	Santa Anita	22.7	10	1st	1:11.10	3 lengths	Joseph Talamo	(Get Funky)	
Oct 25	Breeders' Cup Turf Sprint	Listed	6.5 furlongs	Santa Anita	7.7	15	10th	1:11.60	9 1/2 lengths	Joseph Talamo	Desert Code	
Nov 29	Hollywood Turf Express Handicap	G3	6 furlongs	Hollywood Park	1.7	7	1st	1:08.81	4 1/2 lengths	Joseph Talamo	(Racketeer)	
2009 – Five-year-old season
Aug 19	Green Flash Handicap	Listed	5 furlongs	Del Mar	1.0	8	1st	0:55.22	Neck	Joseph Talamo	(Delta Storm)	
Sep 30	Morvich Handicap	G3	6.5 furlongs	Santa Anita	1.6	10	1st	1:11.40	1 length	Joseph Talamo	(Get Funky)	
Nov 7	Breeders' Cup Turf Sprint	Listed	6.5 furlongs	Santa Anita	3.4	14	1st	1:11.28	1 3/4 lengths	Joseph Talamo	(Gotta Have Her)	
Dec 13	Cathay Pacific Hong Kong Sprint	G1	1200m	Sha Tin	11.0	14	5th	1:09.16	1 3/4 lengths	Joseph Talamo	Sacred Kingdom	
2010 – Six-year-old season
Mar 27	Al Quoz Sprint	G3	1200m	Meydan		16	3rd	1:09.80	1 length	Joseph Talamo	Joy and Fun	
Aug 18	Green Flash Handicap	Listed	5 furlongs	Del Mar	1.1	8	1st	0:55.58	Nose	Mike Smith	(Quick Enough)	
Oct 9	Woodford Stakes	G3	5.5 furlongs	Keeneland	1.7	11	11th	1:02.30	7 lengths	Joseph Talamo	Silver Timber	
Nov 6	Breeders' Cup Turf Sprint	G2	5.5 furlongs	Churchill Downs	18.9	14	8th	0:56.53	4 3/4 lengths	Victor Espinoza	Chamberlain Bridge	
2011 – Seven-year-old season
Jul 3	Robert K. Kerlan Memorial Handicap	Listed	6 furlongs	Hollywood Park	3.5	8	8th	1:08.81	13 1/2 lengths	Tyler Baze	Gallant Son	
Sep 7	Pirate's Bounty Stakes	Listed	6 furlongs	Del Mar	18.6	9	5th	1:08.84	2 1/4 lengths	Pat Valenzuela	Sterling Outlook	
Oct 10	Morvich Handicap	G3	6.5 furlongs	Santa Anita	6.7	8	1st	1:11.91	1/2 lengths	Pat Valenzuela	(Excessive Passion)	
Nov 5	Breeders' Cup Turf Sprint	G2	6.5 furlongs	Churchill Downs	12.3	14	12th	0:56.48	11 1/4 lengths	Pat Valenzuela	Regally Ready	
2012 – Eight-year-old season
Apr 21	San Simeon Handicap	G3	6.5 furlongs	Santa Anita	5.9	7	1st	1:11.59	2 1/4 lengths	Joseph Talamo	(Sayif)	
Nov 3	Breeders' Cup Turf Sprint	G1	6.5 furlongs	Santa Anita	5.9	14	13th	1:11.39	9 1/2 lengths	Joseph Talamo	Mizdirection	

Legend:
Turf All Weather

Distance conversions
Meters	Miles	Furlongs
1,006	0.63	5
1,106	0.69	5.5
1,207	0.75	6
1,308	0.81	6.5
1,408	0.88	7
1,609	1	8

== Pedigree ==
Pedigree of California Flag (USA), gray or roan gelding, 2004
Sire Avenue of Flags (USA) 1988	Seattle Slew (USA); 1974	Bold Reasoning	Boldnesian
Sire Avenue of Flags (USA) 1988	Seattle Slew (USA); 1974	Bold Reasoning	Reason to Earn
Sire Avenue of Flags (USA) 1988	Seattle Slew (USA); 1974	My Charmer	Poker
Sire Avenue of Flags (USA) 1988	Seattle Slew (USA); 1974	My Charmer	Fair Charmer
Sire Avenue of Flags (USA) 1988	Beautiful Glass (USA); 1979	Pass the Glass	Buckpasser
Sire Avenue of Flags (USA) 1988	Beautiful Glass (USA); 1979	Pass the Glass	Amerigo Lady
Sire Avenue of Flags (USA) 1988	Beautiful Glass (USA); 1979	Beautiful Spirit	Bold Bidder
Sire Avenue of Flags (USA) 1988	Beautiful Glass (USA); 1979	Beautiful Spirit	Baby La
Dam Ultrafleet (USA) 1992	Afleet (CAN); 1984	Mr. Prospector (USA)	Raise a Native
Dam Ultrafleet (USA) 1992	Afleet (CAN); 1984	Mr. Prospector (USA)	Gold Digger
Dam Ultrafleet (USA) 1992	Afleet (CAN); 1984	Polite Lady (USA)	Venetian Jester
Dam Ultrafleet (USA) 1992	Afleet (CAN); 1984	Polite Lady (USA)	Friendly Ways
Dam Ultrafleet (USA) 1992	Social Conduct (USA); 1984	Vigors	Grey Dawn (FR)
Dam Ultrafleet (USA) 1992	Social Conduct (USA); 1984	Vigors	Relifordie (FR)
Dam Ultrafleet (USA) 1992	Social Conduct (USA); 1984	Jostling Queen	Knightly Manner
Dam Ultrafleet (USA) 1992	Social Conduct (USA); 1984	Jostling Queen	Day O. (Family 9-f)
