= 2018 Breeders' Cup =

Thoroughbred horse racing event

- Logo of the 2018 Breeders' Cup
- Class: Championship Event Series
- Location: Churchill Downs
- Race type: Thoroughbred
- Website: www.breederscup.com

Race information
- Distance: See individual races
- Surface: Turf, Dirt
- Purse: Varies by Race; from $1 million to $6 million

The 2018 Breeders' Cup World Championships was the 35th edition of the premier event of the North American thoroughbred horse racing year. The 14 races, all but one of which were Grade I, took place on November 2 and 3 at Churchill Downs in Louisville, Kentucky. The races were telecast by NBCSN on Friday and early Saturday, and by NBC later on Saturday. The Breeders' Cup is generally regarded as the end of the North American racing season, although a few Grade I events take place in later November and December. The event typically determines champions in many of the Eclipse Award divisions, although it was missing the eventual Horse of the Year, Triple Crown champion Justify, who was retired in July.

== Qualifying ==
A maximum of 14 horses (12 in the Turf Sprint and Juvenile Turf Sprint) are allowed to start in each race. Horses can automatically qualify by winning one of the designated races in the Breeders' Cup Challenge series, which provide "Win and You're In" berths in a specified division of the Breeders' Cup. Other pre-entries are ranked by a points system and the judgement of a panel of experts.

A record 221 pre-entries were taken on October 24. Twelve races, including the Classic, were over-subscribed, meaning more than 14 horses (12 in the Juvenile Turf Sprint) wished to enter. Forty-eight of the pre-entries were automatic qualifiers through the Challenge series.

Five winners of Challenge series races went on to win their respective division at the Breeders' Cup:

- Accelerate, who won the Classic, automatically qualified by winning both the Pacific Classic and Awesome Again Stakes
- Game Winner won the Juvenile after automatically qualifying by winning the American Pharoah Stakes
- Sistercharlie won the Filly & Mare Turf after automatically qualifying in the Beverly D. Stakes
- Roy H won the Santa Anita Sprint Championship and the Sprint
- Jaywalk won both the Frizette Stakes and Juvenile Fillies

== Event preparation ==
In April 2016, the Breeders' Cup organization announced that Churchill Downs would host the event for the ninth time in 2018. As the home of the Kentucky Derby, Churchill Downs had the capacity to host the large crowds and betting handle expected at the event. Churchill Downs underwent a $70 million upgrade to its facilities to secure the bid, focused on improved dining and viewing spaces.

One of the major changes for 2018 was that the Friday card, dubbed "Future Stars Friday", featured five juvenile races (those restricted to two-year-old horses). This included a new race, the Breeders' Cup Juvenile Turf Sprint, which was the only race in the series that was not a Grade I event as it was not yet eligible for graded status. The Distaff, which had previously highlighted the Friday card, was held on Saturday.

== Results ==
=== Friday, November 2 ===
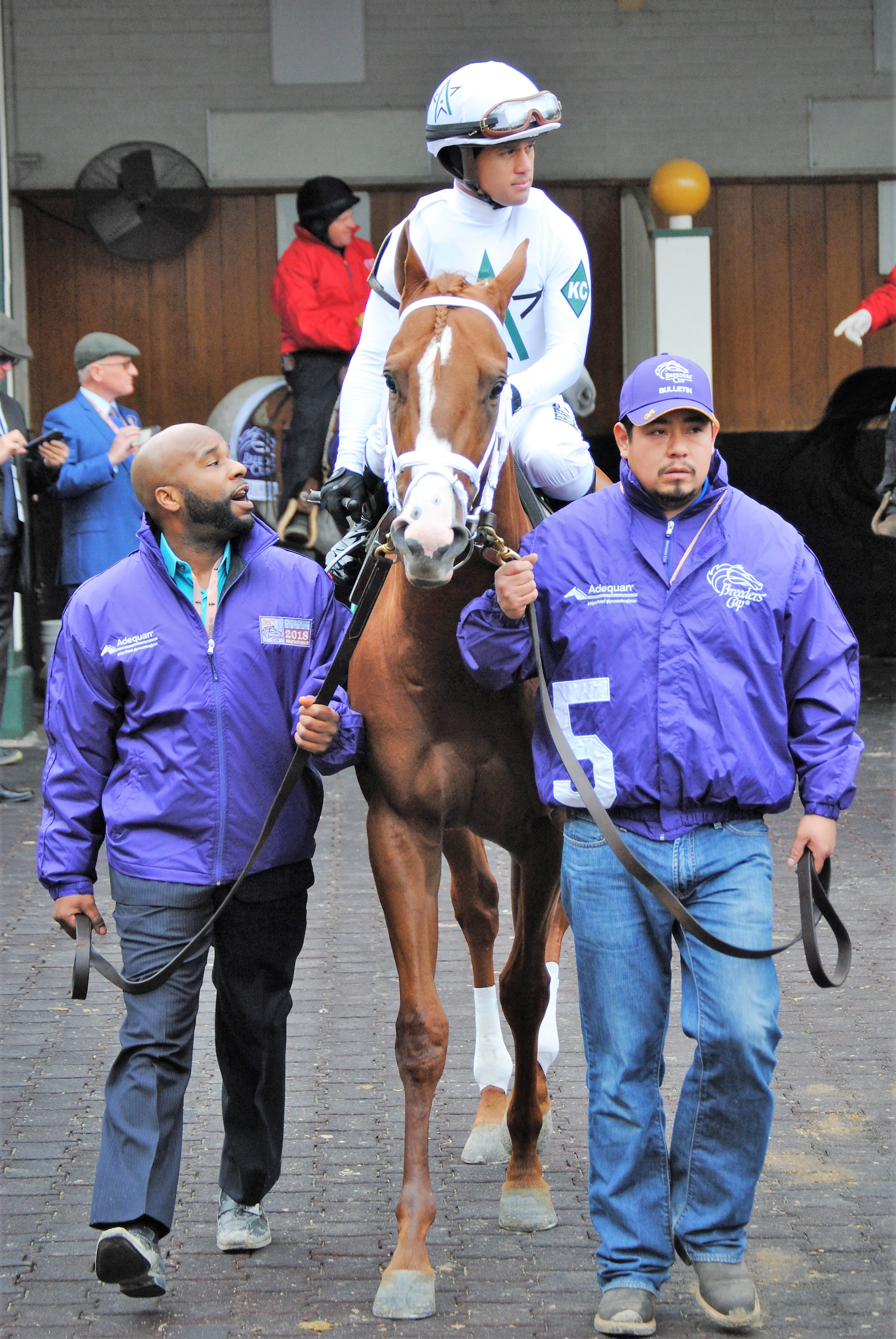
Bulletin

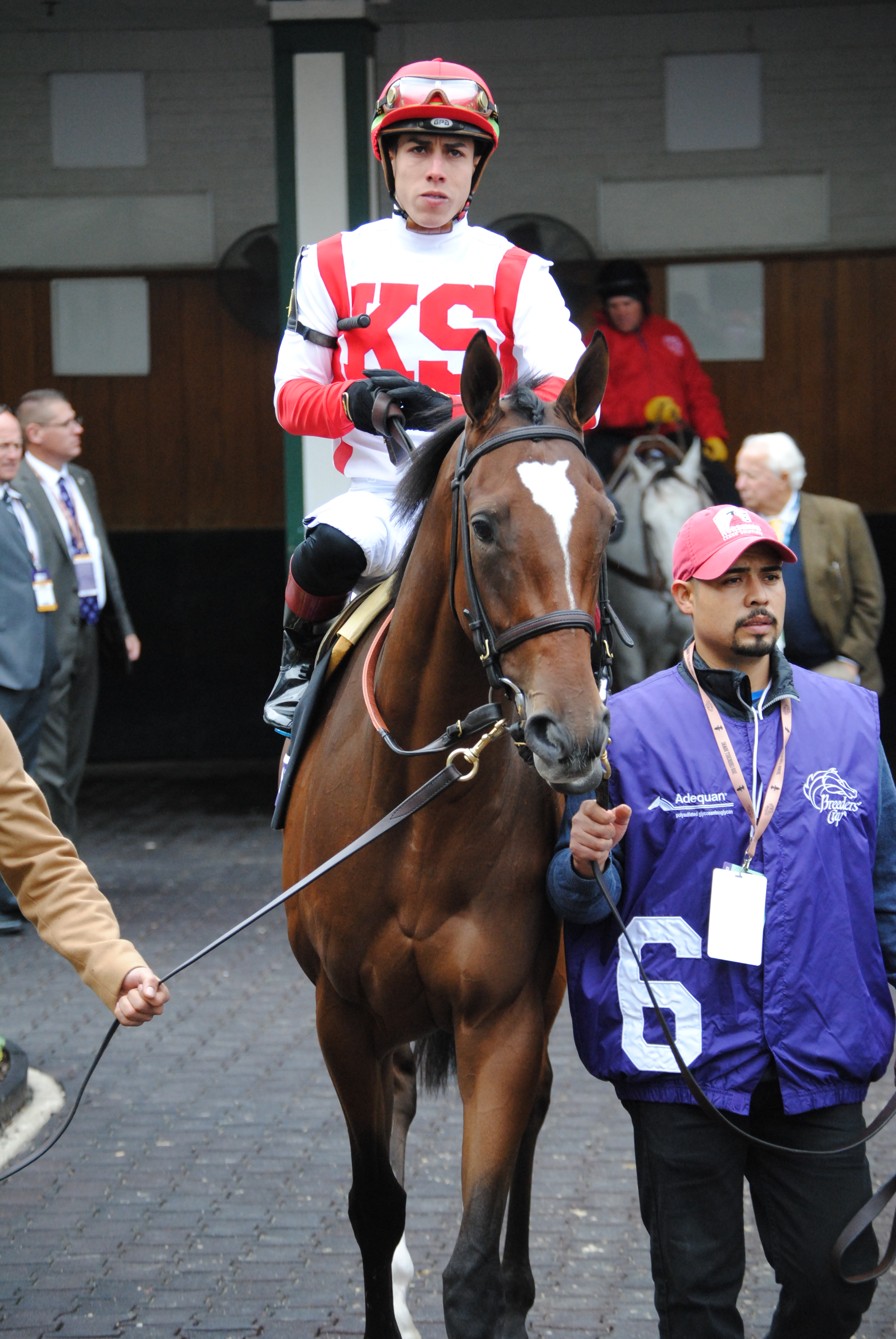
Newspaperofrecord

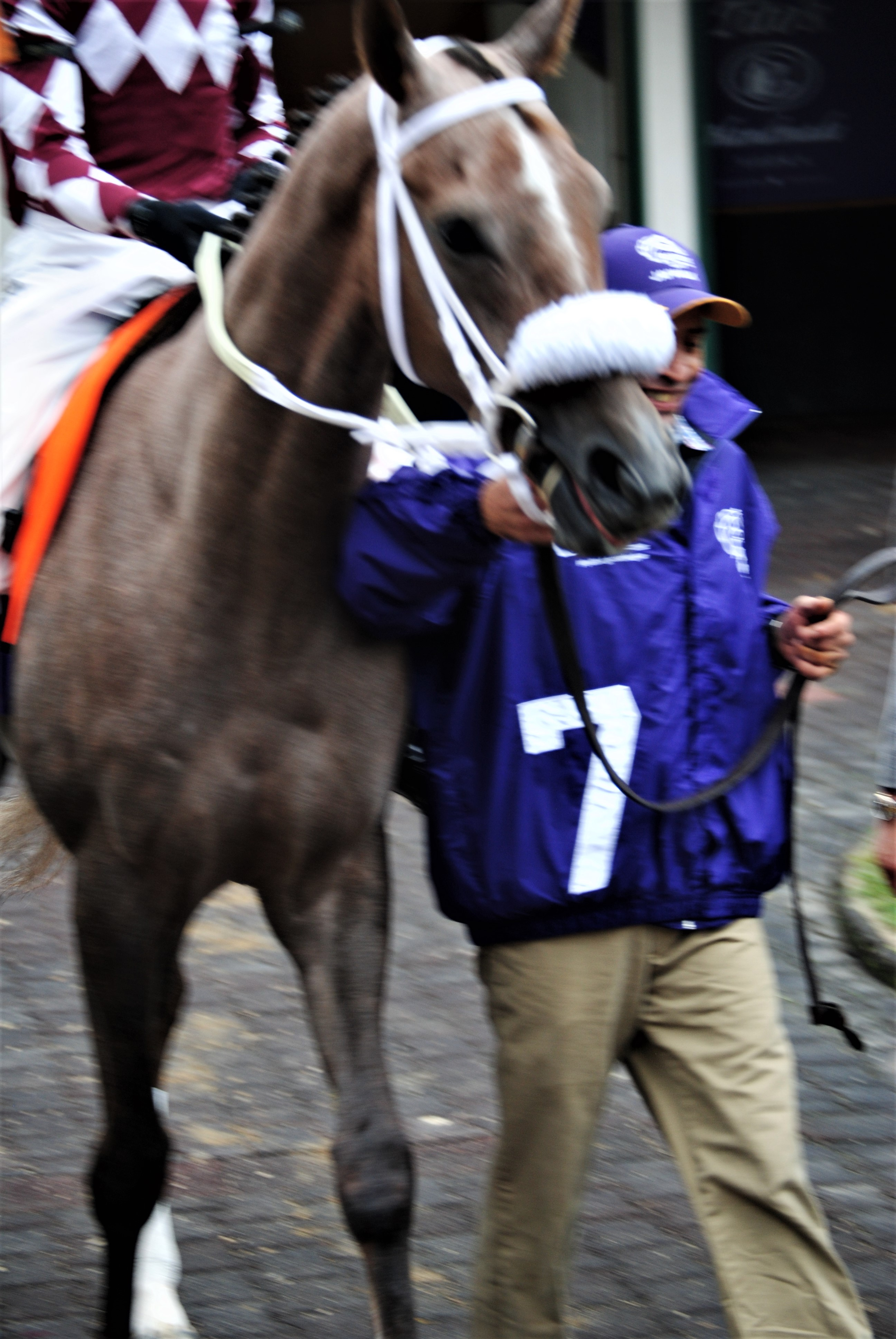
Jaywalk

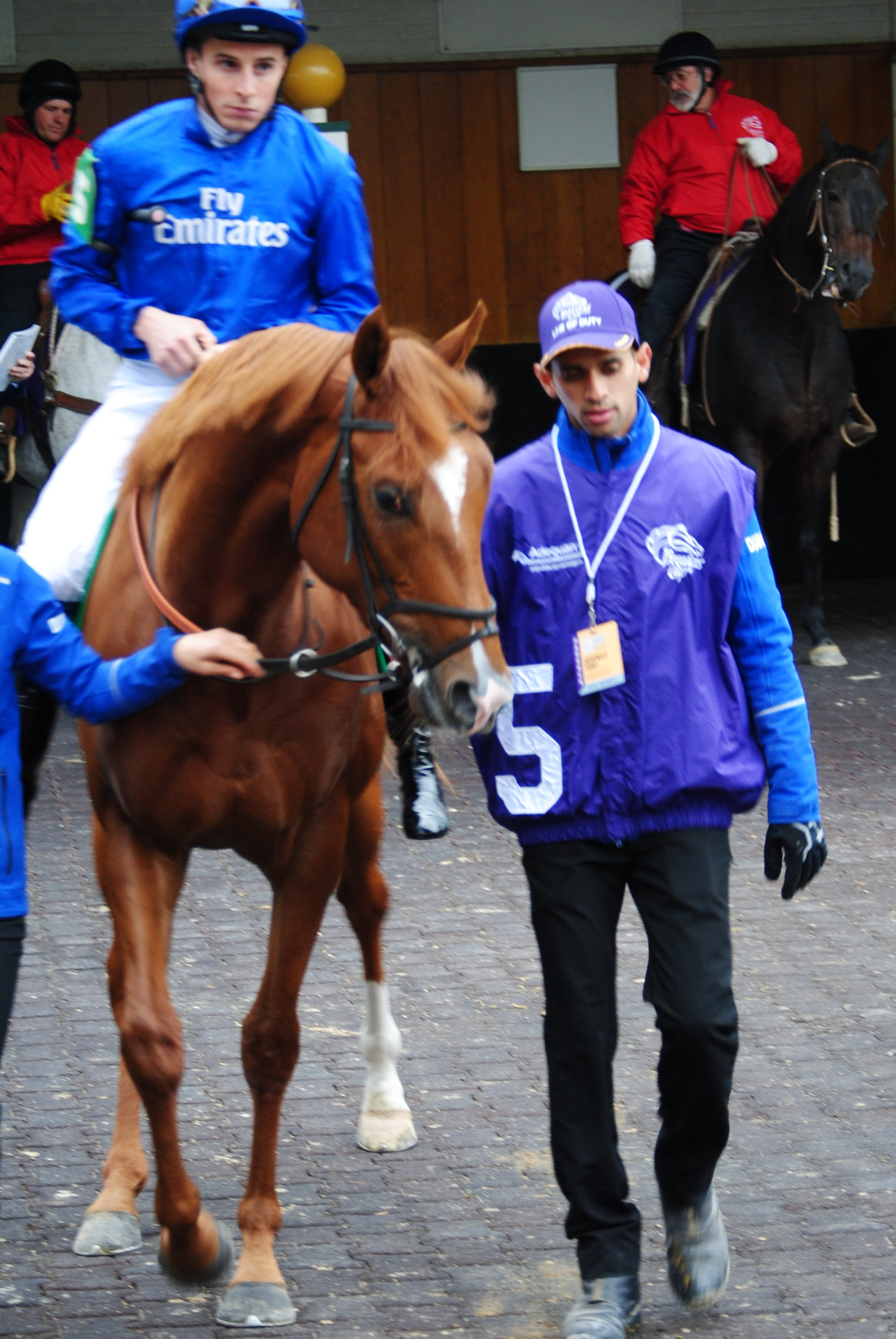
Line of Duty

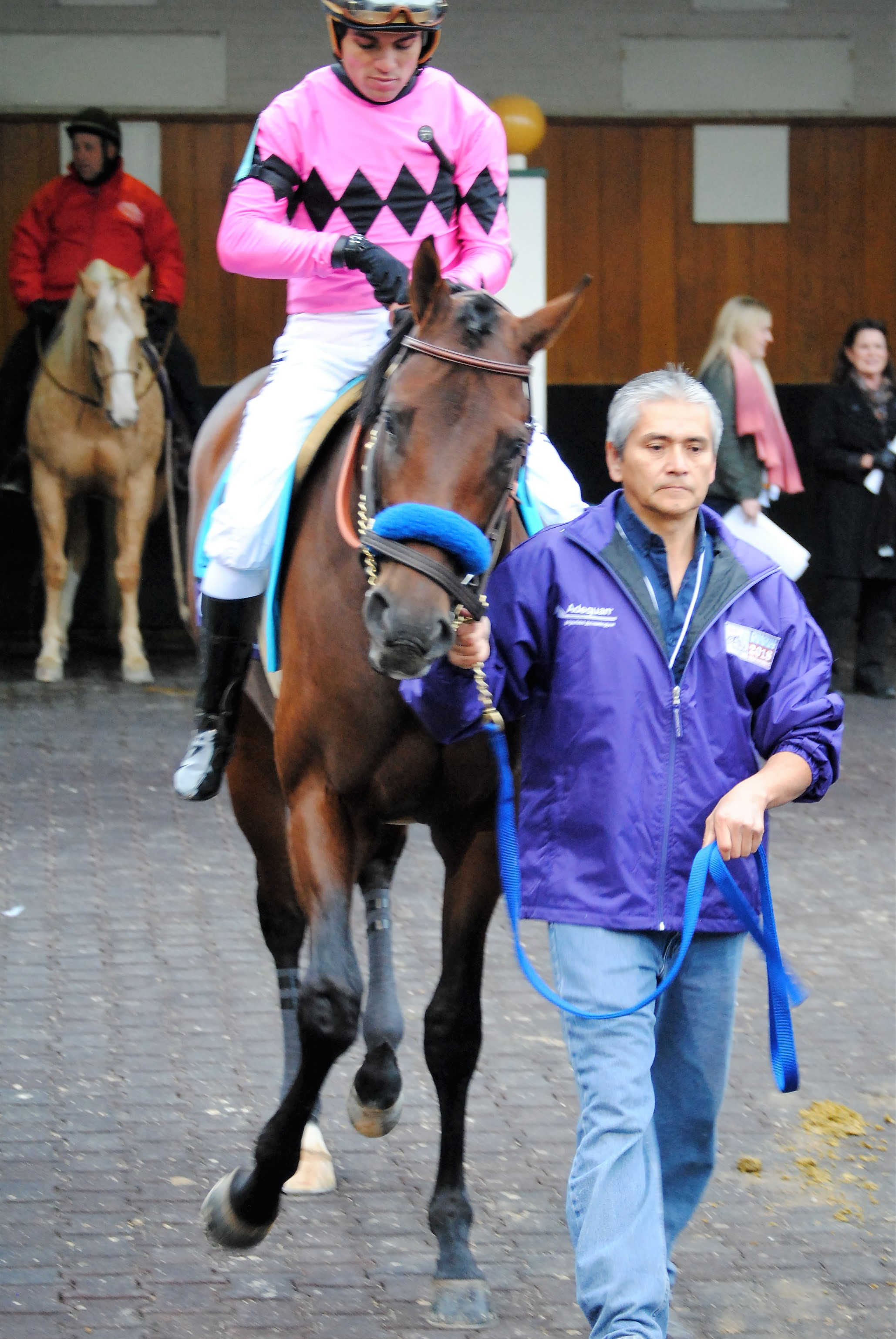
Game Winner

The attendance on Friday was 42,249, up 29% from the previous year at Del Mar and up 4% over the last time the Breeders' Cup was held at Churchill Downs, in 2011. The total amount wagered on the 10 race card was $52,216,685, similar to the amount wagered in 2017.

Game Winner dominated the Breeders' Cup Juvenile, making him the clear favorite for the title of American Champion Two-Year-Old Male Horse and an early contender for the 2019 Kentucky Derby. The voting for Champion Two-Year-Old Filly was expected to be much closer, with Newspaperofrecord, winner of the Juvenile Fillies Turf, and Jaywalk, winner of the Juvenile Fillies, as the leading candidates. Although dirt performances traditionally receive greater recognition in North America, Newspaperofrecord's victory on turf was widely regarded as one of the most impressive performances of the event.

Race name	Post time (EDT)	Sponsor	Distance/Surface	Restrictions	Purse	Winner (Bred)	Odds	Margin
Juvenile Turf Sprint	3:21 PM		about 5 1/2 furlongs (Turf)	2-year-olds	$1 million	Bulletin	4.30	2 3/4 lengths
Juvenile Fillies Turf	4:00 PM		1 mile (Turf)	2-year-old fillies	$1 million	Newspaperofrecord (IRE)	0.60	6 3/4 lengths
Juvenile Fillies	4:40 PM	Tito's Handmade Vodka	1 1/16 miles	2-year-old fillies	$2 million	Jaywalk	5.50	5 1/2 lengths
Juvenile Turf	5:22 PM		1 mile (Turf)	2-year-old colts and geldings	$1 million	Line of Duty (IRE)	3.50	1/2 length
Juvenile	6:05 PM	Sentient Jet	1 1/16 miles	2-year-old colts and geldings	$2 million	Game Winner	1.00	2 1/4 lengths

Source: Equibase Charts

The races were televised on NBCSN.

=== Saturday, November 3 ===
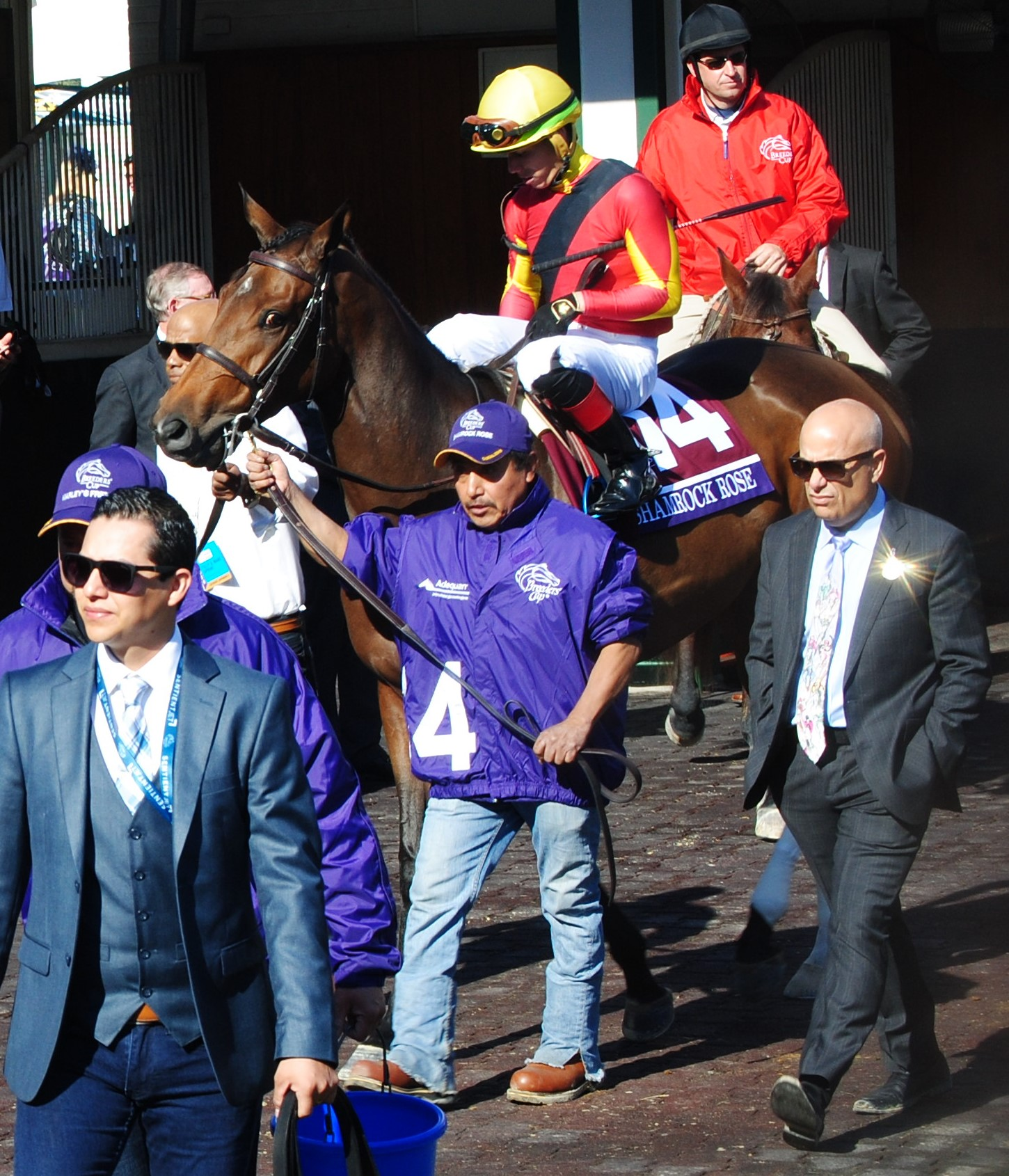
Shamrock Rose - Filly & Mare Sprint

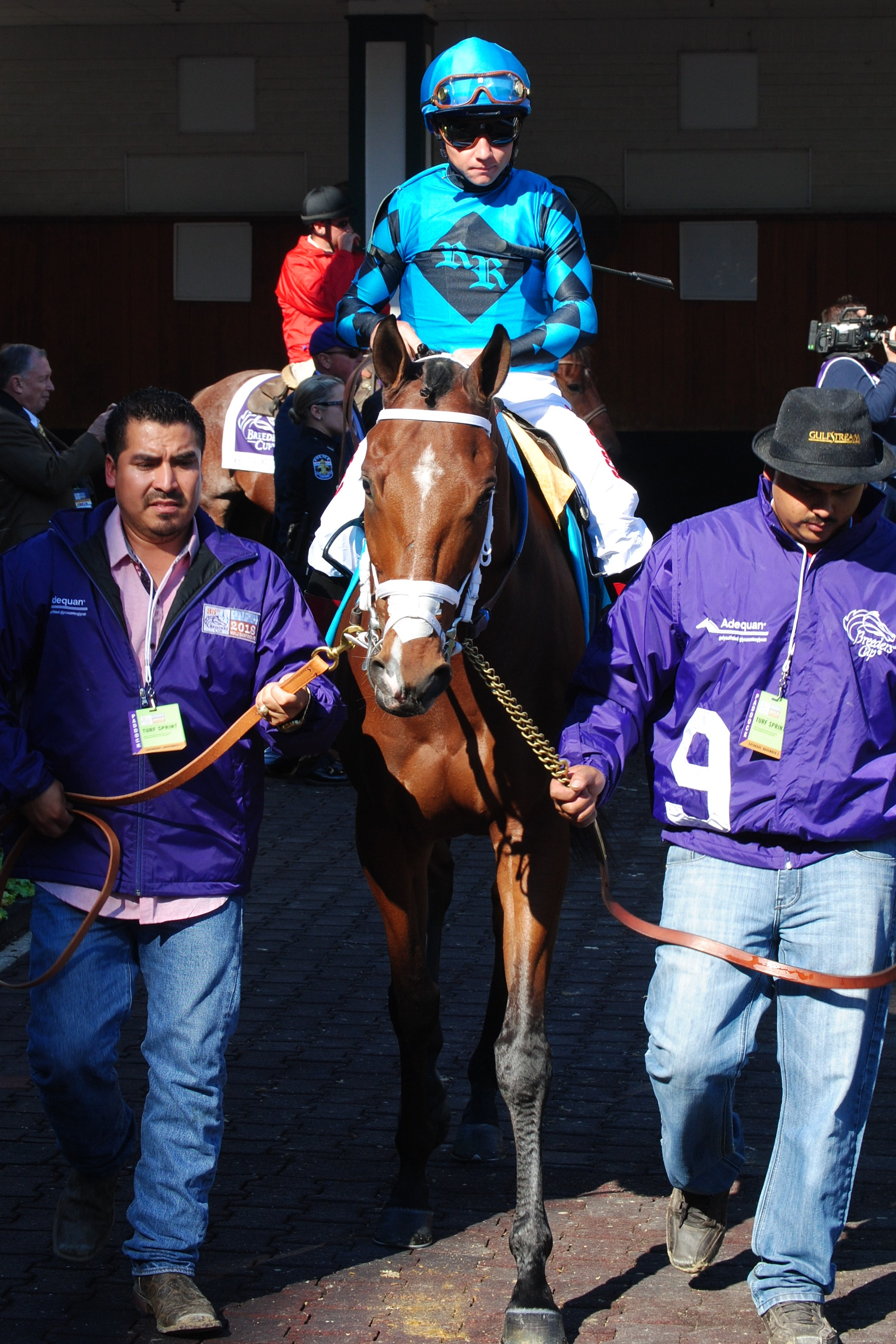
Stormy Liberal - Turf Sprint

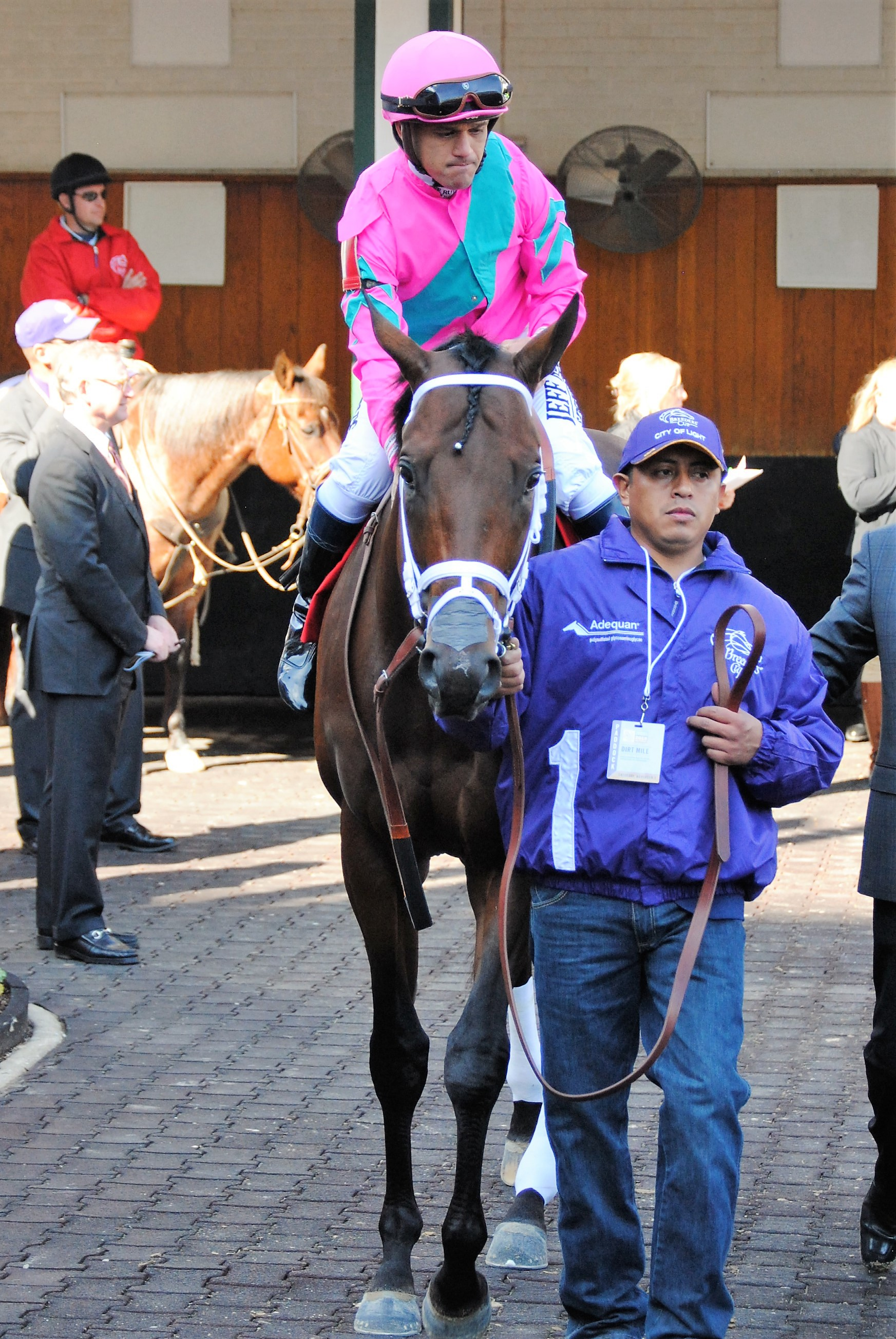
City of Light - Dirt Mile

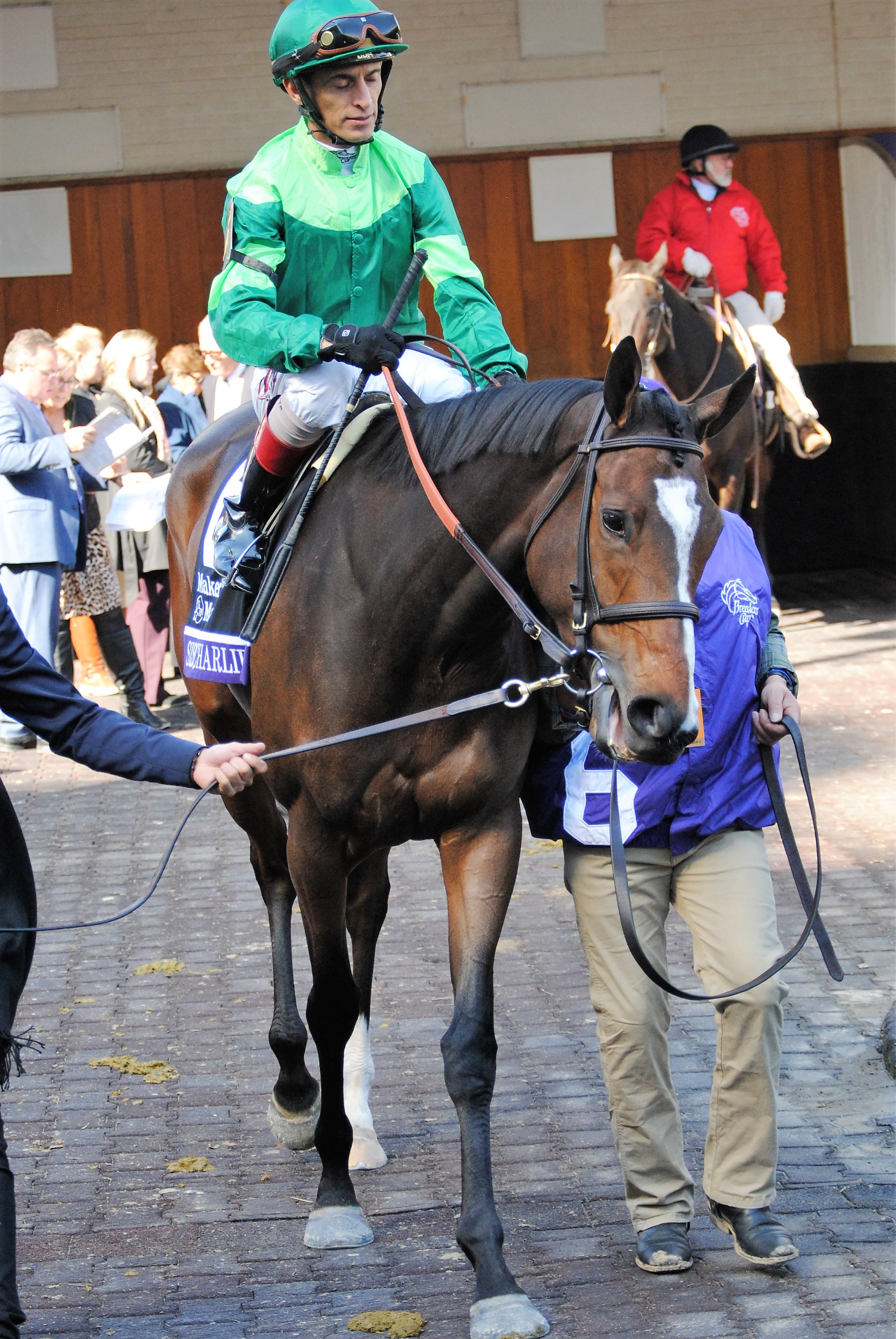
Sistercharlie - Filly & Mare Turf

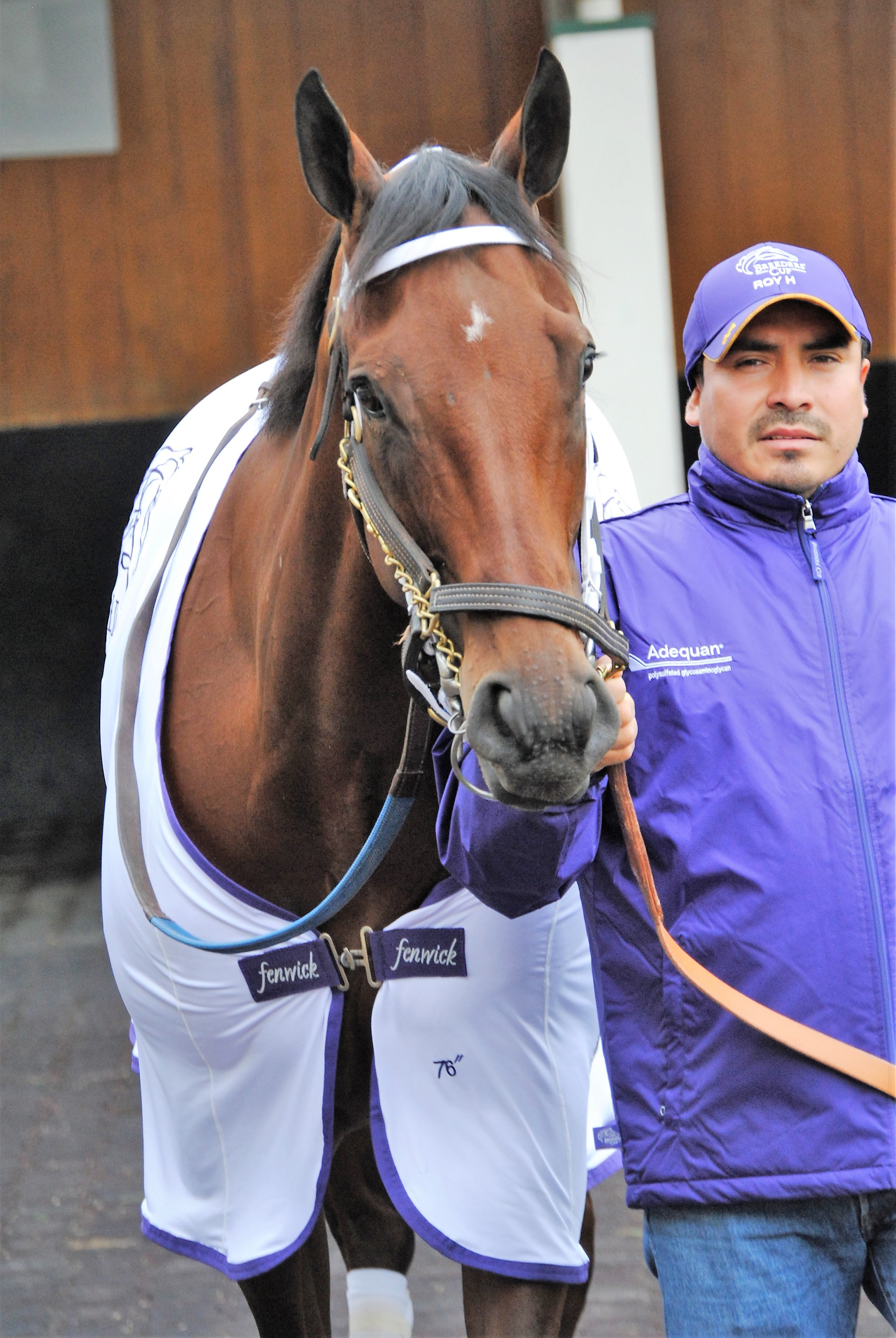
Roy H - Sprint

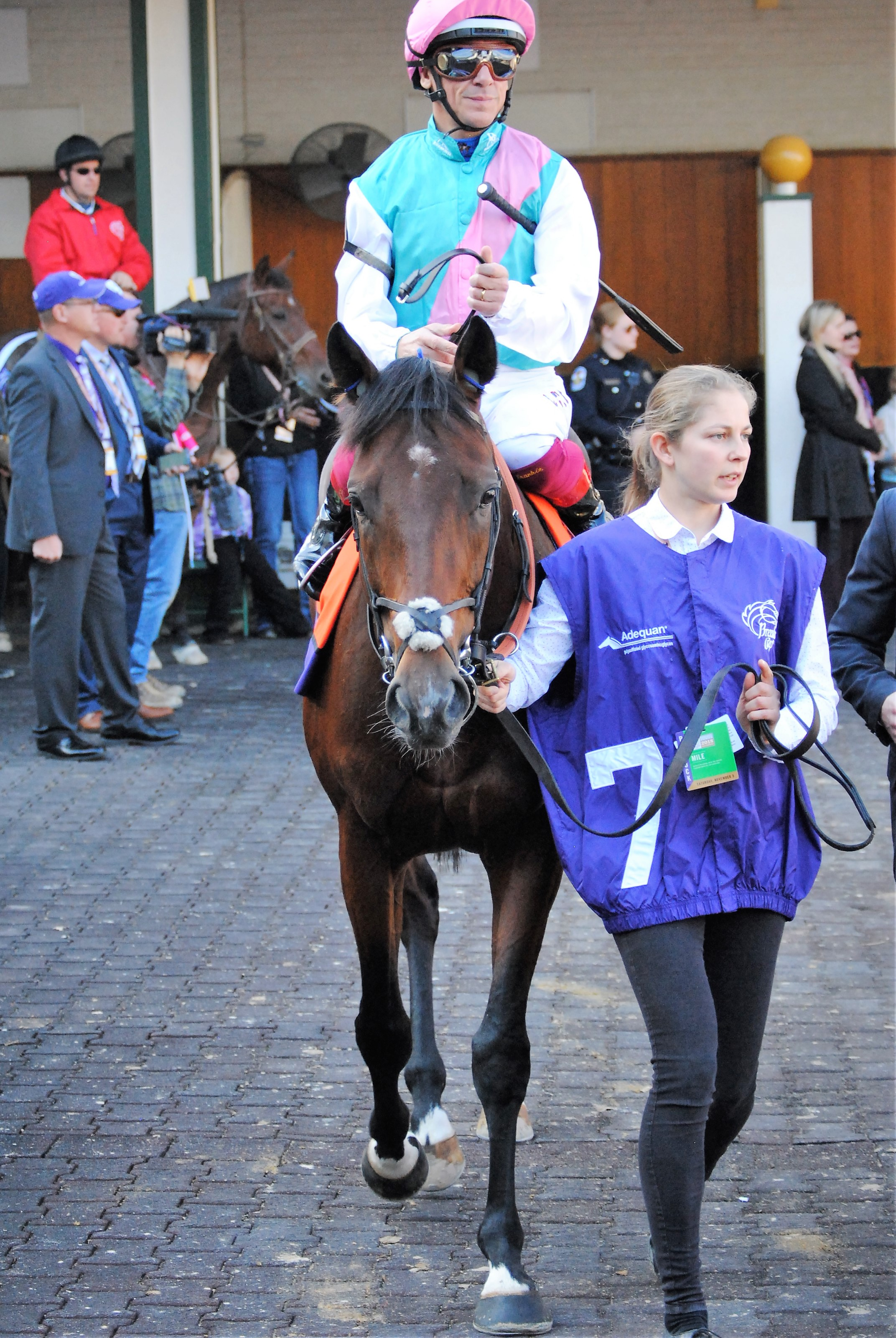
Expert Eye - Mile

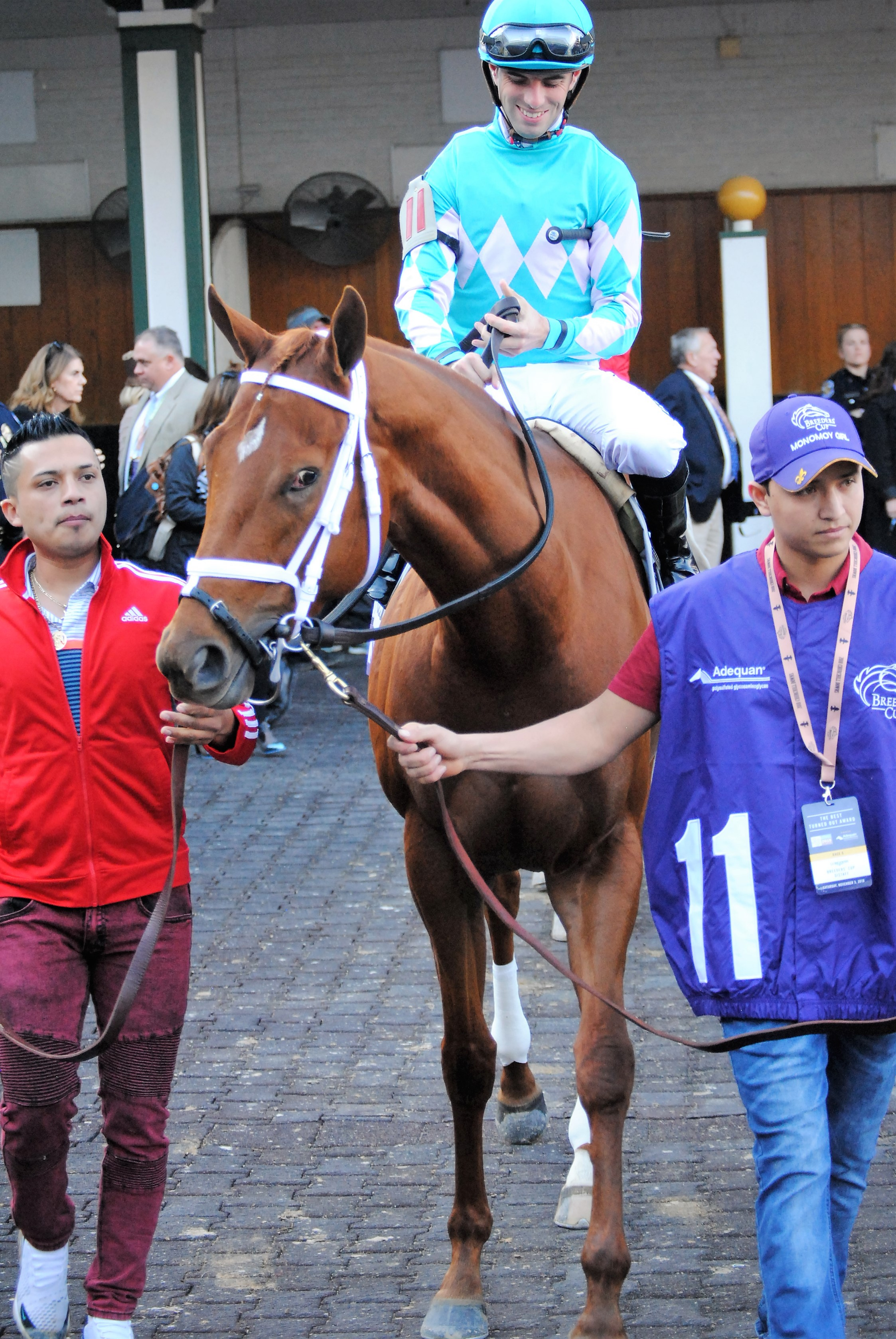
Monomoy Girl - Distaff

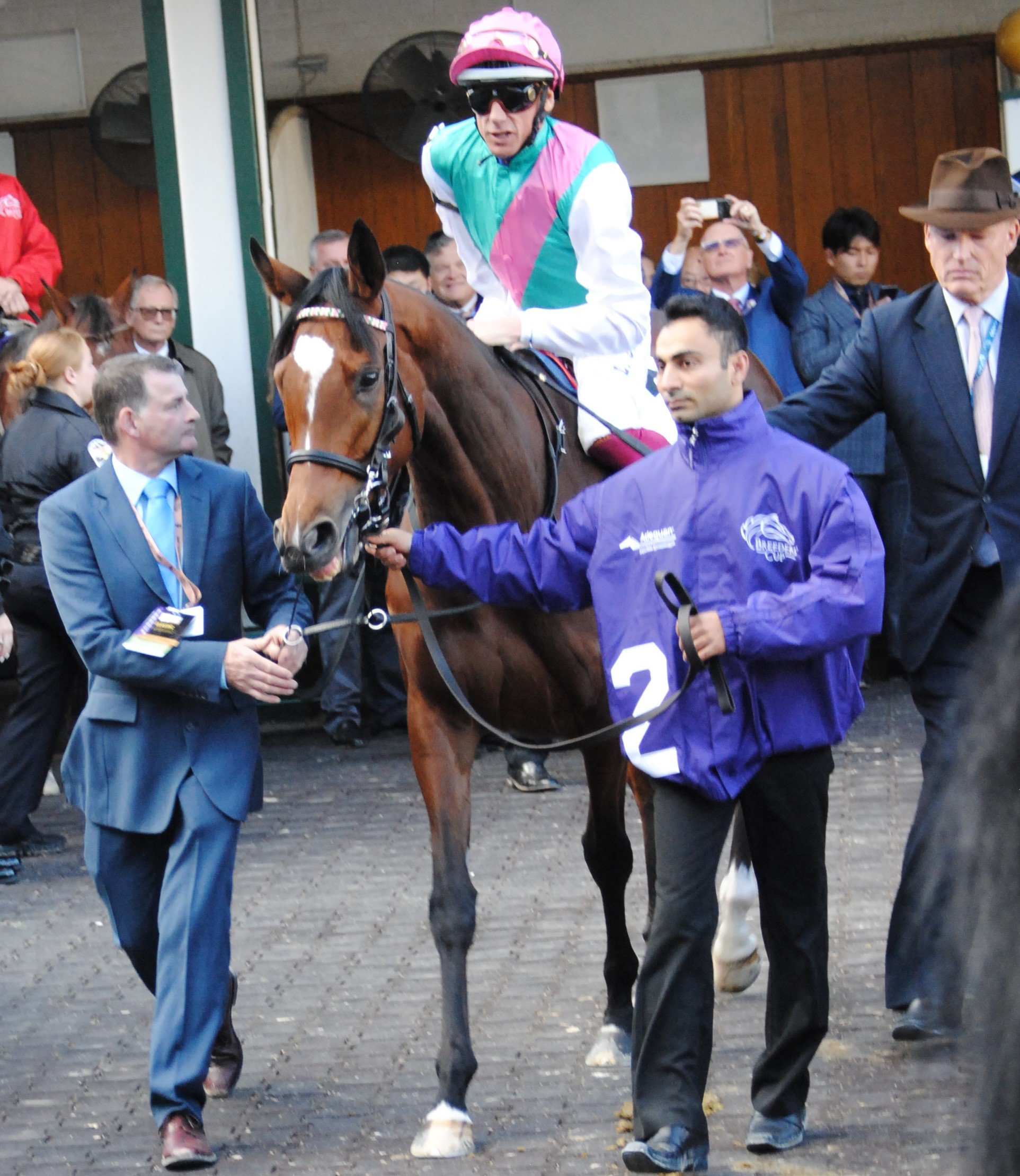
Enable - Turf

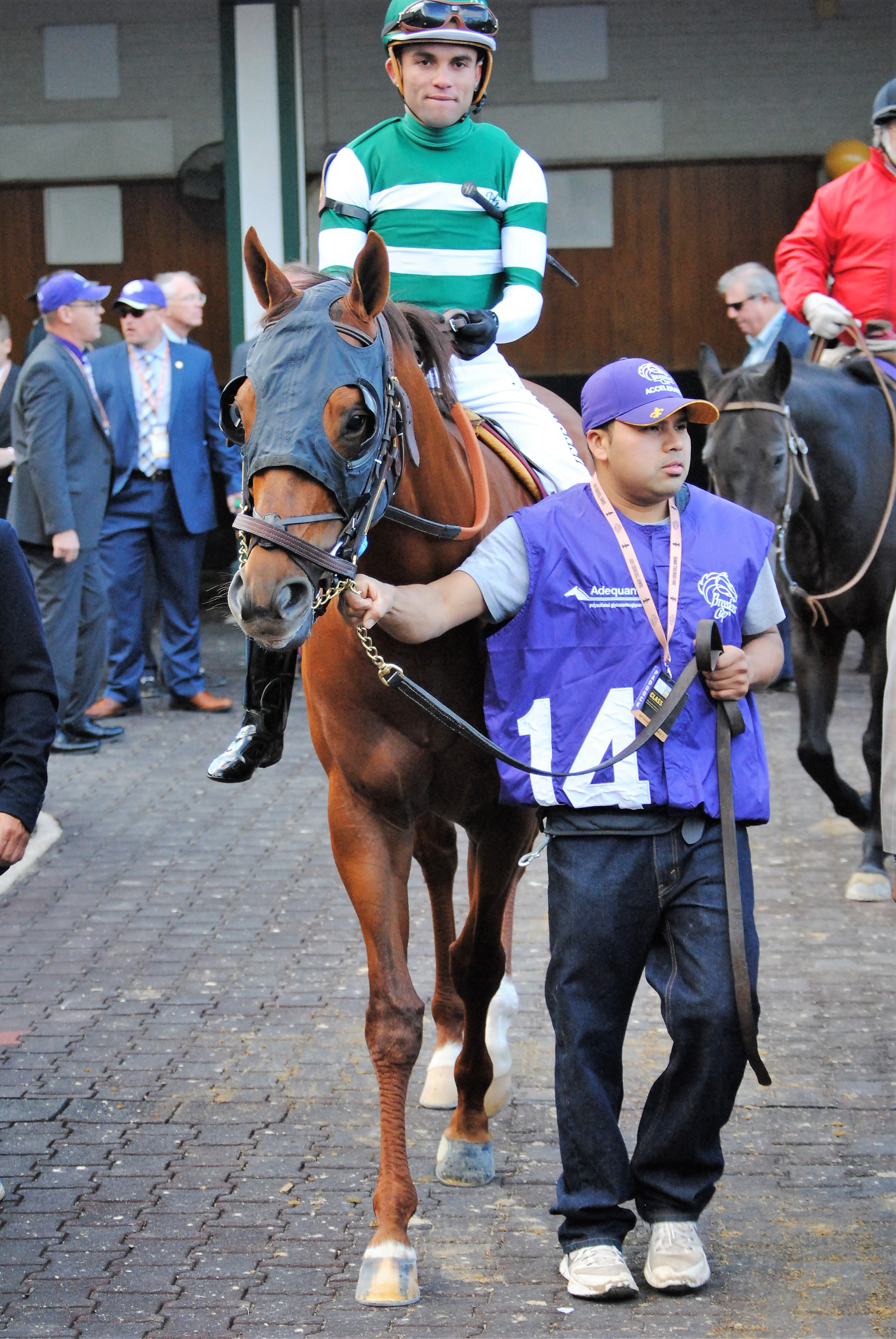
Accelerate - Classic

The Saturday card was watched by a crowd of 70,423, a major increase from the previous year's attendance at Del Mar, which had been capped at 37,500. However, the total amount bet on the nine Breeders' Cup races held on Saturday was down 4% from 2017. The weather was cool with the turf course officially listed as good, verging on yielding. The main track was officially listed as fast.

The highlights were Accelerate's victory in the Classic and Enable's win in the Turf. Enable became the first horse to win the Prix de l'Arc de Triomphe and Breeders' Cup Turf in the same year. Her owner-breeder Juddmonte Farms, trainer John Gosden and jockey Frankie Dettori also won the Mile with Expert Eye.

Peter Miller became the first person to train back-to-back winners of two races after Stormy Liberal and Roy H won the Turf Sprint and Sprint respectively. John Sadler, who saddled his first Breeders' Cup runner in 1988, earned his first win at the event with Accelerate in the Classic. Brad Cox also trained his first winner, Monomoy Girl in the Distaff.

Irad Ortiz Jr. won the Shoemaker Award for outstanding jockey at the event after he won two races, the Juvenile Fillies Turf with Newspaperofrecord and the Filly & Mare Sprint with Shamrock Rose, plus scoring five more top four finishes. Florent Geroux finished second in the standings after riding three winners over the weekend: Jaywalk in the Juvenile Fillies, Game Winner in the Juvenile and Accelerate in the Classic. Paco Lopez earned his first Breeders' Cup win aboard Roy H in the Sprint.

With his win in the Classic, Accelerate cemented his chances to win the Eclipse Award for Champion Older Male Dirt Horse, and moved into consideration for American Horse of the Year. Similarly, Monomoy Girl "stands out" in the three-year-old filly division after winning the Distaff and Roy H locked up his second win in the Sprint division. The female turf horse division will likely be between Enable, who became the first horse to win the Prix de l'Arc de Triomphe and Breeders' Cup Turf in the same year, and Sistercharlie, with four Group I wins in North America including the Filly & Mare Turf.

Race Name	Post time (EDT)	Sponsor	Distance/Surface	Restrictions	Purse	Winner (Bred)	Odds	Margin
Filly & Mare Sprint	12:00 PM		7 furlongs	3 yrs+ fillies & mares	$1 million	Shamrock Rose	25.90	Head
Turf Sprint	12:38 PM		5 1/2 furlongs (Turf)	3 yrs+	$1 million	Stormy Liberal	7.00	Neck
Dirt Mile	1:16 PM		1 mile	3 yrs+	$1 million	City of Light	2.60	2 3/4 lengths
Filly & Mare Turf	2:04 PM	Maker's Mark	1 3/8 miles (Turf)	3 yrs+ fillies & mares	$2 million	Sistercharlie (IRE)	3.30	Neck
Sprint	2:46 PM	TwinSpires	6 furlongs	3 yrs+	$2 million	Roy H	2.70	3 1/4 lengths
Mile	3:36 PM		1 mile (Turf)	3 yrs+	$2 million	Expert Eye (GB)	5.90	1/2 length
Distaff	4:16 PM	Longines	1 1/8 miles	3 yrs+ fillies & mares	$2 million	Monomoy Girl	1.80	1 length
Turf	4:56 PM	Longines	1 1/2 miles (Turf)	3 yrs+	$4 million	Enable (GB)	0.80	3/4 length
Classic	5:44 PM		1 1/4 miles	3 yrs+	$6 million	Accelerate	2.70	1 length

Source: Equibase Charts

The early races were televised by NBCSN. The main NBC network broadcast the Mile, Distaff, Turf and Classic.
