= Green Flash Handicap =

- Class: Grade II
- Location: Del Mar Racetrack; Del Mar, California, United States
- Inaugurated: 2003
- Race type: Thoroughbred - Flat racing
- Website: Del Mar Thoroughbred Club

Race information
- Distance: 5 furlongs
- Surface: Turf
- Track: Left-handed
- Qualification: Three years old and older
- Weight: Assigned
- Purse: $200,000 (2026)

The Green Flash Handicap is a Grade II American Thoroughbred horse race for thoroughbreds three years old and older, over a distance of five furlongs on the turf held annually in August at Del Mar Racetrack in Del Mar, California. The event currently carries a purse of $150,000.

== History ==
The race was inaugurated in 2003 as a Listed event.

In 2014 the event was moved to the All Weather Track.

The event was upgraded to a Grade III event in 2019.

== Records ==
Speed record:

- 54.75 - Fast Parade (2006)

Margins:

- 3 1/4 lengths – Fast Parade (2006)

Most wins

- 3 - Motorious (GB) (2023, 2024, 2025)

Most wins by a jockey

- 3 - Joseph Talamo (2009, 2011, 2019)

Most wins by a trainer

- 3 - Brian J. Koriner (2009, 2010, 2019)
- 3 - Philip D'Amato (2023, 2024, 2025)

Most wins by an owner

- 3 - Anthony Fanticola (2023, 2024, 2025)

== Winners ==
Year	Winner	Jockey	Trainer	Owner	Time	Purse	Gr.	Ref.
2026	Sorrento Sky (IRE)	Umberto Rispoli	Philip D'Amato	Benowitz Family Trust, CYBT, McLean Racing Stables, Saul Gevertz, Marc Lantzman and Michael Nentwig	56.12	$200,000	II	
2025	Motorious (GB) (Note: Road Runner was first past the post but was disqualified for interference early in the event hindering several runners including Motorious and placed second)	Antonio Fresu	Philip D'Amato	Anthony Fanticola	55.90	$153,500	III	
2024	Motorious (GB)	Antonio Fresu	Philip D'Amato	Anthony Fanticola	56.14	$152,500	III	
2023	Motorious (GB)	Geovanni Franco	Philip D'Amato	Anthony Fanticola	56.07	$153,500	III	
2022	Lieutenant Dan	Juan J. Hernandez	Steven Miyadi	Nicholas B. Alexander	55.87	$152,500	III	
2021	Lieutenant Dan	Geovanni Franco	Steven Miyadi	Nicholas B. Alexander	55.98	$101,500	III	
2020	Chaos Theory	Umberto Rispoli	John W. Sadler	Hronis Racing	56.22	$101,000	III	
2019	Mr Vargas	Joseph Talamo	Brian J. Koriner	Jay Em Ess Stable	56.15	$100,351	III	
2018	Stormy Liberal	Drayden Van Dyke	Peter L. Miller	Rockingham Ranch & D. A. Bernsen	55.66	$88,400	Listed	
2017	Tribalist	Victor Espinoza	Blake R. Heap	G. Watts Humphrey Jr.	56.93	$104,620		
2016	Why Two	Norberto Arroyo Jr.	Michael Machowsky	Kagele Brothers, E. Marchosky, K. Shaw & Lo Hi Stable	56.01	$100,000		
2015	Holy Lute	Santiago Gonzalez	James M. Cassidy	Class Racing Stables	56.24	$87,080		
2014	Merit Man	Kent J. Desormeaux	Robert B. Hess Jr.	B. Chandler, Double Kee & Purple Shamrock	57.22	$94,500		
2013	Sirocco Strike	Julien R. Leparoux	Jeff Mullins	Trueline Racing	55.34	$100,690		
2012	Shrug	Victor Espinoza	Carla Gaines	Swift Thoroughbreds	56.00	$93,600		
2011	Raetodandty	Joseph Talamo	Val Brinkerhoff	Val Brinkerhoff	55.64	$105,745		
2010	California Flag	Mike E. Smith	Brian J. Koriner	Hi Card Ranch	55.58	$102,175		
2009	California Flag	Joseph Talamo	Brian J. Koriner	Hi Card Ranch	55.22	$106,100	Listed	
2008	Get Funky	Jose Valdivia Jr.	John W. Sadler	Keith Abraham	55.10	$102,175	Listed	
2007	Barber	Richard Migliore	Art Sherman	William J. Zellerbach	55.71	$95,760	Listed	
2006	Fast Parade	Norberto Arroyo Jr.	Peter L. Miller	Gary & Cecil Barber	54.75	$95,545	Listed	
2005	Courageous King	Mike E. Smith	Wesley A. Ward	R and R King Stables & Wesley Ward	55.11	$76,300	Listed	
2004	Geronimo (CHI)	Corey Nakatani	Michael Machowsky	W. C. Buster Jr., Rusty Hays, Surfside Equine, et al.	55.15	$76,350	Listed	
2003	King Robyn	Alex O. Solis	Jeff Mullins	Cornejo Racing	55.45	$78,800	Listed	

Legend:
All Weather Track Turf
