= Drayden Van Dyke =

American jockey (born 1994)

Personal information
- Born: September 10, 1994 (age 31) Louisville, Kentucky
- Occupation: Jockey

Horse racing career
- Sport: Horse racing
- Career wins: 821 (as of July 7, 2024)

Major racing wins
- Rodeo Drive Stakes (2015); Mother Goose Stakes (2015); Frank E. Kilroe Mile Stakes (2015); Maker's 46 Mile Stakes (2016); Awesome Again Stakes (2017, 2020); Starlet Stakes (2017—2020); Malibu Stakes (2017); Cotillion Stakes (2017); Los Alamitos Cash Call Futurity (2018); Triple Bend Stakes (2018); Del Mar Debutante Stakes (2019); Del Mar Oaks (2020); Hollywood Gold Cup Stakes (2020) Breeders' Cup wins: Breeders' Cup Turf Sprint (2018); Breeders' Cup Filly & Mare Sprint (2024)

Racing awards
- Del Mar Leading Jockey (2018) Summer (2018) Fall

Honors
- Eclipse Award for Outstanding Apprentice Jockey (2014)

Significant horses
- Authentic, Bast, City of Light, Improbable, It Tiz Well, Justify, Stormy Liberal, War of Will, West Coast

Drayden Van Dyke (born September 10, 1994, in Louisville, Kentucky) is a jockey in thoroughbred racing. At graded stakes races, Van Dyke has won 67 events ranging from Grade I to Grade III. Of these wins, Van Dyke has won both the Starlet Stakes and Yellow Ribbon Handicap four times. As a Breeders' Cup jockey, Van Dyke won the Turf Sprint event at the 2018 Breeders' Cup. He was also runner-up at the Breeders' Cup Mile event in 2018 and the Dirt Mile at the 2021 Breeders' Cup.

As a Triple Tiara and Triple Crown and racer, Van Dyke was second at the 2017 Alabama Stakes and fourth at the 2018 Kentucky Derby. He was voted the 2014 Eclipse Award for Outstanding Apprentice Jockey, the highest national honor for an American apprentice rider. In 2018, Van Dyke tied the record for most Del Mar races won in one day with Victor Espinoza. In his overall career, Van Dyke has won over 770 races and accumulated more than $49 million in prize winnings.

== Early life and education ==
Van Dyke was born in Louisville, Kentucky on September 10, 1994. While he lived in Louisville with his father Seth Van Dyke, he also lived in Hot Springs, Arkansas with his mother. In Hot Springs, Van Dyke did not receive a spot to a high school basketball team due to his height. During his early teens, Van Dyke began his equestrian career as a hot walker before he wanted to become a jockey like his father. For his training, Van Dyke was an exercise rider for James Baker at Oaklawn Park before he started working at Churchill Downs for Tom Proctor. He then went to Ocala, Florida to train horses at Glen Hill Farm in 2012.

== Racing career ==
On November 21, 2013, at Hollywood Park Racetrack, aboard only the second mount of his career, Drayden Van Dyke won his first race. He earned his first riding title in 2018 when he was the leading jockey at Del Mar Racetrack for both the summer and fall meets.

In graded stake races, Van Dyke's first win was at the 2014 Pucker Up Stakes at the Grade III event before winning his 23rd Grade III event in 2021. During these years, Van Dyke was a two-time winner at the Jimmy Durante Stakes and Torrey Pines Stakes. As a grade II jockey, Van Dyke first won the 2015 Santa Ana Stakes before becoming a four-time winner at the Yellow Ribbon Handicap. He also had 11 graded race wins in 2018 before winning his 26th Grade II race in 2021. In Grade I events, Van Dyke has won the Starlet Stakes four times. Van Dyke's first Grade I win was at the 2015 Rodeo Drive Stakes before he had his 18th Grade I win in 2020.

=== Triple Crowns and Triple Tiaras ===
During the Triple Crown of Thoroughbred Racing, Van Dyke was fourth at the 2018 Kentucky Derby and nineteenth at the 2019 Kentucky Derby. During the 2021 Kentucky Derby, Van Dyke finished the event in twelfth place. As part of the American Triple Tiara of Thoroughbred Racing, Van Dyke was third at the 2015 Coaching Club American Oaks. In additional Triple Tiara races, Van Dyke competed at the 2015 Alabama Stakes and had a fifth-place finish. During the 2017 Alabama Stakes, Van Dyke was second.

=== Breeders Cup ===
As a Breeders' Cup Challenge competitor, Van Dyke qualified for the 2015 Breeders' Cup by winning the Rodeo Drive Stakes. Van Dyke additionally qualified for the 2017 Breeders' Cup by winning the Awesome Again Stakes and the 2018 Breeders' Cup with his win at the Pat O'Brien Stakes. His 2021 win at the Pat O'Brien Stakes allowed Van Dyke to qualify for the 2021 Breeders' Cup.

At the Breeders' Cup in the Filly & Mare Turf, Van Dyke was fifth in 2015. His highest finish after his three races in 2017 was third place in the Filly & Mare Turf. In 2018, Van Dyke won the Turf Sprint event with Stormy Liberal. During his seven other Breeders' Cup races at the 2018 edition, Van Dyke was also second in the Mile division. As a competitor at the 2019 Breeders' Cup in five events, Van Dyke's highest result was eighth place in the Filly & Mare Sprint race. During the 2021 event, Van Dyke was runner-up in the Dirt Mile.

=== Suspensions ===
The California Horse Racing Board imposed upon Van Dyke a three racing days suspension and a $15,600 fine for a riding crop violation on winner Soul of an Angel in the Breeders' Cup Filly & Mare Sprint.

== Awards and overall performance ==
In 2014, Van Dyke received the Eclipse Award for Outstanding Apprentice Jockey. He also was the 2018 TVG Breakthrough Jockey of the Year recipient. That year, Van Dyke tied the record made by Victor Espinoza for most Del Mar races won in one day. At Del Mar, Van Dyke won the most races during the summer and fall seasons in 2018.

During his career, Van Dyke has won more than 770 races and received over $49 million in prize winnings. In Equibase ranks for North American jockeys, his highest placing for most wins was a 23rd-place finish in 2014. For most earnings by a North American jockey, Van Dyke's highest finish was in 2018 when he reached 13th place.

== Personal life ==
In January 2017, Van Dyke broke his right arm during a race at Santa Anita Park. Following surgery and physiotherapy, Van Dyke returned to racing in June 2017. During the Del Mar Futurity in September 2019, Van Dyke re-injured his right arm. Van Dyke returned to racing from his injury in late September 2019.
