= Stormy Liberal =

American-bred Thoroughbred racehorse (born 2012)

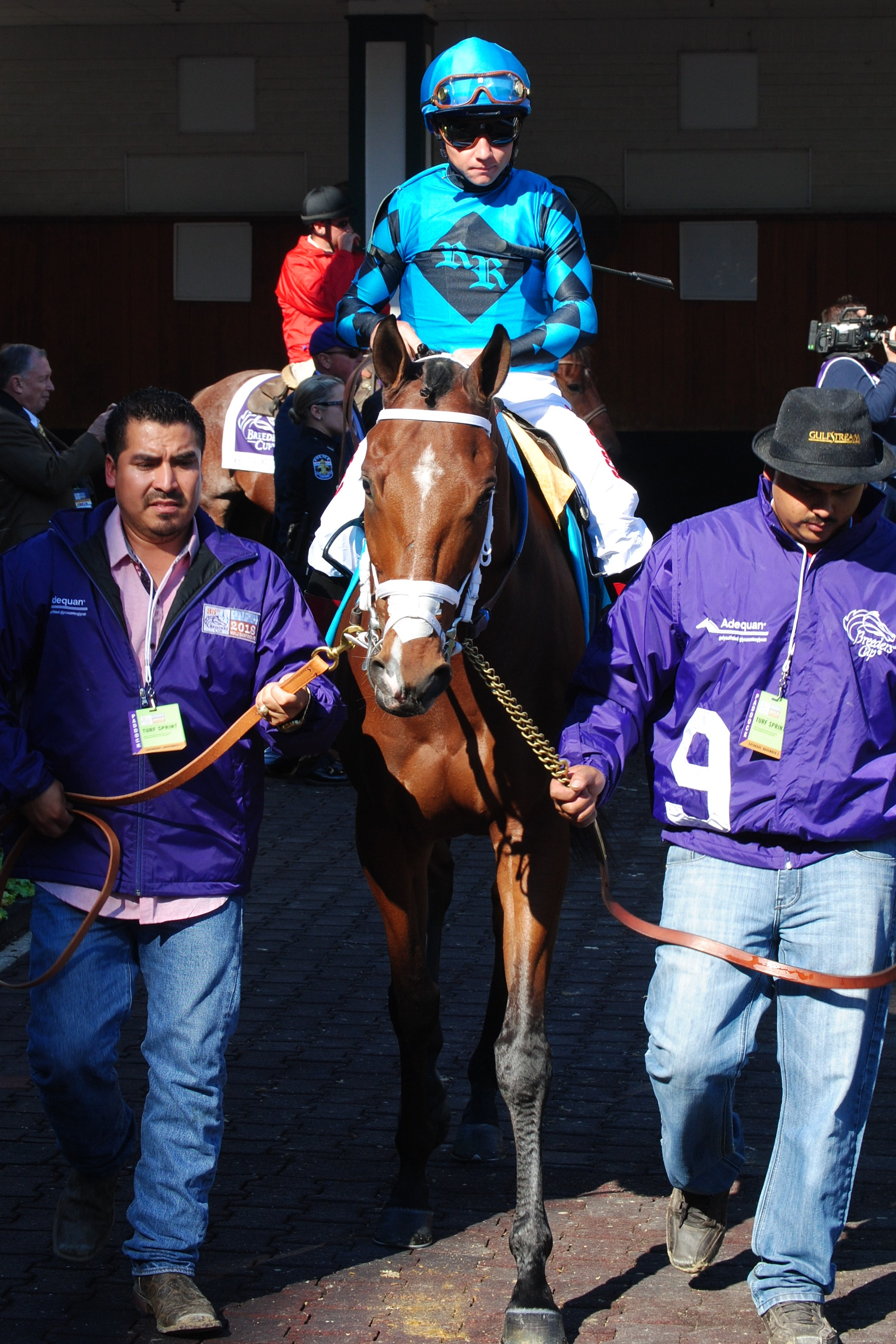
- Stormy Liberal at the 2018 Breeders' Cup
- Sire: Stormy Atlantic
- Grandsire: Storm Cat
- Dam: Vassar
- Damsire: Royal Academy
- Sex: Gelding
- Foaled: April 12, 2012
- Country: United States
- Colour: Bay
- Breeder: Dapple Bloodstock & Gryphon Investments
- Owner: Success Racing Two (2014-2016); Rockingham Ranch and David Bernsen (2016-2018)
- Trainer: Doug O'Neill (2014-2016); Peter Miller (2016-2018)
- Record: 37: 12-10-3
- Earnings: $2,212,580

Major wins
- Clocker's Corner Stakes (2017); Joe Hernandez Stakes (2017); Siren Lure Stakes (2017); Daytona Stakes (2017); Green Flash Handicap (2018); Eddie D Stakes (2018) Breeders' Cup wins: Breeders' Cup Turf Sprint (2017, 2018)

Awards
- American Champion Turf Horse (2018)
- Last updated on 5 May 2020

Stormy Liberal (foaled April 12, 2012) is a retired American Thoroughbred racehorse. He broke his maiden in his second start at age two but won only once in the next two years. In October 2016, he was claimed by trainer Peter Miller for $40,000 and went on to become a multiple stakes winner, including back-to-back wins in the Breeders' Cup Turf Sprint in 2017 and 2018. He was named the American Champion Turf Horse of 2018.

== Background ==
Stormy Liberal is a bay gelding who was bred in Kentucky by Dapple Bloodstock & Gryphon Investments. He was sired by Stormy Atlantic, a stakes-winning son of leading sire Storm Cat. Stormy Liberal became his sire's 100th black-type winner when he won the Clocker's Corner Stakes in 2017. His dam Vassar, by Royal Academy, had previously produced stakes winner Shimmering Moment. She is a granddaughter of successful broodmare Luv Luvin', the family of Henrythenavigator and Saffron Walden.

Stormy Liberal was originally offered for sale by Dapple Stud at the Fasig-Tipton 2015 select yearling sale but did not meet his reserve at $165,000. He was ultimately sold as a two-year-old in training at the Ocala sales for $100,000 to Dennis O'Neill, acting as the agent for his brother Doug O'Neill. Stormy Liberal was originally trained by O'Neill for Success Racing.

== Racing career ==
Stormy Liberal made his first start on September 3, 2014, in a maiden special weight run at a distance of 5 1/2 furlongs on the then-existing all-weather track at Del Mar. He pressed the pace while racing wide around the turn, but tired and faded to eighth place. On October 10, he was entered in a maiden special weight over Santa Anita's downhill turf case. He broke well and entered into a speed duel with Dream Police for the early lead. Turning into the stretch, Stormy Liberal took the lead then held off a late run from Battle of Evermore to win by a length.

Stormy Liberal was then stepped up in class to enter the Cecil B. DeMille Stakes at Del Mar on November 30, run over a distance of one mile. He stalked the early pace and took the lead in mid-stretch but was passed late by Conquest Typhoon. Stormy Liberal finished his two-year-old campaign by finishing tenth in the Eddie Logan Stakes on December 27.

At age three, Stormy Liberal was entered in five allowance optional claiming races. His only win came over the Santa Anita downhill turf course on October 24, in which the field included future sprint champion Roy H.

Stormy Liberal started his four-year-old season with three straight second-place finishes in allowance optional claiming races, then a fifth. After a summer layoff, he returned on October 16, 2016, in a $40,000 claiming race at Santa Anita. Stormy Liberal won easily and was claimed by Peter Miller for Rockingham Ranch. Stormy Liberal finished the year with two second-place finishes for his new connections.

=== 2017: five-year-old season ===
Stormy Liberal made his first start as a five-year-old on January 29, 2017, in the Clocker's Corner Stakes at Santa Anita. Over the downhill turf course, he led from gate to wire to earn his first stakes victory by 1 1/2 lengths.

On March 4, Stormy Liberal followed up by winning the listed Joe Hernandez Stakes, again over Santa Anita's downhill turf course. Running from off the pace, he made a strong stretch run to take the lead and held off the late closing Perfectly Majestic by a nose. He then survived a steward's inquiry regarding another horse, Danzing Candy, who had been cut off when Stormy Liberal passed him in the stretch. Jockey Norberto Arroyo Jr. noted the gelding's tendency to drift in, but was confident the result would stand. "I was flying by those horses," he said.

Stormy Liberal continued his winning streak by taking the Siren Lure Stakes on April 23, then earned his first graded stakes victory in the Daytona Stakes on May 27. The latter was won by just a neck but Arroyo felt the gelding had been waiting for the second-place horse to get close. "I had them from the get go and I knew I had more horse than him the whole time."

Stormy Liberal was shipped out of California for the first time for the Jaipur Invitational Stakes at Belmont Park on June 10. His winning streak was broken with an eighth-place finish after he weakened in the stretch run. The winner Disco Partner set a world record of 1:05.67 for six furlongs in the race.

Stormy Liberal then had a long layoff before returning on November 4 in the Breeders' Cup Turf Sprint, held that year at Del Mar – trainer Peter Miller's home base. Going off as a 30-1 longshot, Stormy Liberal staged a major upset when he beat stablemate Richard's Boy by a head after rating behind a fast early pace. "I thought we had home-court advantage and they ran to that," said Miller. "I couldn't be prouder of these horses. They're just two gutsy, tough, hard-knocking horses." It was the first Breeders' Cup win for Miller and Rockingham Ranch, who then doubled up when Roy H won the Breeders' Cup Sprint soon afterwards.

After running eleventh in the Hong Kong Sprint at Sha Tin, Stormy Liberal finished the year with a record of five stakes win from seven starts.

=== 2018: six-year-old season ===
Stormy Liberal made his 2018 debut in the Daytona Stakes on February 24 at Santa Anita, and finished a fast-closing second behind stablemate Conquest Tsunami, with another stablemate Calculator in third. "Unbelievable," said Miller."Maybe Stormy Liberal was a little further back than I would have liked, but for his first race since Hong Kong, I thought he ran well."

Stormy Liberal was then shipped to Meydan Racecourse in Dubai for the Al Quoz Sprint on March 31, in which he finished second to Jungle Cat. He made his next start in the Jaipur International at Belmont Park, finishing sixth to Disco Partner after lacking his normal closing kick.

After four straight losses, Miller dropped Stormy Liberal down to allowance company at Del Mar on July 25. There he faced the highly regarded Tribalist, who had three wins over Del Mar's turf course. Tribalist took the early lead then fought to hold off Stormy Liberal's late drive. Despite being bumped, Stormy Liberal inched by to win by a nose under new jockey Drayden Van Dyke. "He looked good, and that's all that really matters," said Brian Trump, the racing manager of Rockingham Ranch. "We liked the chemistry between Drayden and him."

On August 17, Stormy Liberal returned to stakes company in the listed Green Flash Handicap at Del Mar. He stalked the early pace then made a wide move to win by a nose over Richard's Boy. He then extended his winning streak in the Eddie D Stakes at Santa Anita on September 28 with a similar performance. "He knows where the wire is, for sure, but think he could've won by three (lengths)," Van Dyke said. "I thought I'd be a little farther back, but he broke like a rocket, so I was up close."

Despite his three-race winning streak, Stormy Liberal went off at odds of 7-1 in the Breeders' Cup Turf Sprint, held in 2018 at Churchill Downs in Kentucky. He again tracked the early pace, then swung wide to move alongside favorite World of Trouble. The two horses dueled down the stretch, with Stormy Liberal prevailing by a neck. "He just has a tremendous heart," commented co-owner David Bernsen. "He really wants to win. He does just enough, he doesn't overexert himself in any race or any workout... his soundness and durability have also been keys. With most horses, you can't do this. They're just not able to. He's just a special horse in so many ways."

=== 2019: seven-year-old season ===
Stormy Liberal was winless in seven starts in 2019 with two second-place finishes and three thirds. He was eighth in his final start on November 2 when attempting to defend his title in the Breeders' Cup Turf Sprint. After the race, David Bernsen bought out Rockingham Ranch to become sole owner, then sent the horse to Florida for an extensive medical evaluation. Diagnostic imaging revealed defects to the cartilage of both front fetlocks. Because of the time required to heal (six to eight months), he was retired. He resides e at Old Friends in Georgetown, Kentucky.

== Pedigree ==
Pedigree of Stormy Liberal, bay gelding, 2012
Sire Stormy Atlantic 1994	Storm Cat; 1983	Storm Bird	Northern Dancer
Sire Stormy Atlantic 1994	Storm Cat; 1983	Storm Bird	South Ocean
Sire Stormy Atlantic 1994	Storm Cat; 1983	Terlingua	Secretariat
Sire Stormy Atlantic 1994	Storm Cat; 1983	Terlingua	Crimson Saint
Sire Stormy Atlantic 1994	Hail Atlantis; 1987	Seattle Slew	Bold Reasoning
Sire Stormy Atlantic 1994	Hail Atlantis; 1987	Seattle Slew	My Charmer
Sire Stormy Atlantic 1994	Hail Atlantis; 1987	Flippers	Coastal
Sire Stormy Atlantic 1994	Hail Atlantis; 1987	Flippers	Moccasin
Dam Vassar 1999	Royal Academy; 1987	Nijinsky	Northern Dancer
Dam Vassar 1999	Royal Academy; 1987	Nijinsky	Flaming Page
Dam Vassar 1999	Royal Academy; 1987	Crimson Saint	Crimson Satan
Dam Vassar 1999	Royal Academy; 1987	Crimson Saint	Bolero Rose
Dam Vassar 1999	Dixie Fine; 1990	L'Emigrant	The Minstrel
Dam Vassar 1999	Dixie Fine; 1990	L'Emigrant	Suprina
Dam Vassar 1999	Dixie Fine; 1990	Luv Luvin'	Raise a Native
Dam Vassar 1999	Dixie Fine; 1990	Luv Luvin'	Ringing Bells (family: 9-b)

Stormy Liberal is inbred 4S x 4D to Northern Dancer, meaning this sire appears in the fourth generation on the sire's and dam's side of the pedigree. He is also inbred 4S x 3D to Crimson Saint.
