= Mizdirection =

American-bred Thoroughbred racehorse

- Sire: Mizzen Mast
- Grandsire: Cozzene
- Dam: Deceptive
- Damsire: Clever Trick
- Sex: Mare
- Foaled: 19 April 2008
- Country: United States
- Color: Gray
- Breeder: Joseph J. Perrotta
- Owner: The Jungle Partnership
- Trainer: Mike Puype
- Record: 17:11-4-1
- Earnings: $1,719,621

Major wins
- Monrovia Stakes (2012, 2013); Breeders' Cup Turf Sprint (2012, 2013); Buena Vista Stakes (2013); Las Cienegas Stakes (2012, 2013)

Honors
- Mizdirection Stakes (2014– ) at Santa Anita
- Last updated on 23 May 2022

Mizdirection (foaled 19 April 2008) is an American Thoroughbred racehorse. A specialist sprinter, she is best known for winning the Breeders' Cup Turf Sprint in 2012 and 2013.

== Background ==
Mizdirection is a dark-coated gray mare with a white star bred in Kentucky by Joseph J. Perrotta. Her sire Mizzen Mast, from whom she inherited her gray coat, won the Prix de Guiche on turf in France but improved when he was exported to the United States to race on dirt, winning the Malibu Stakes and the Strub Stakes. At stud he has sired many other good winners including Ultimate Eagle (Hollywood Derby), Mast Track (Hollywood Gold Cup), Midships (Charles Whittingham Memorial Handicap) and Flotilla (Breeders' Cup Juvenile Fillies Turf, Poule d'Essai des Pouliches).

The filly was consigned by Perrotta to the Keenland sales as a yearling in 2009 and was bought for $85,000 by Litt Bloodstock. In May 2010, as an unraced two-year-old she was again offered for sale and bought for $50,000 by Solis Bloodstock. She entered into the ownership of Jungle Racing LLC (headed by Jim Rome), Strauss, Nish (KMN Racing, LLC), Grohs, MSK Racing Ventures, LLC and Beljak and has been trained throughout her racing career by Mike Puype.

== Racing career ==
=== 2011: three-year-old season ===
Unraced as a two-year-old, Mizdirection raced seven times as a three-year-old in 2011, winning three times and never finishing worse than third. Her wins came in a maiden race over six furlongs at Hollywood Park in May, the Sandy Blue Handicap over one mile at Del Mar Racetrack in August and an allowance race over six furlongs at Hollywood Park in December. When tried in Graded class she finished second in the Grade II San Clemente Handicap at Del Mar in July and third behind Great Hot and Groupie Doll in the Grade II Raven Run Stakes at Keeneland in October.

=== 2012: four-year-old season ===
Mizdirection began her four-year-old season in the Grade III Monrovia Stakes over 6 1/2 furlongs at Santa Anita Park on January 3. Ridden by Garrett Gomez, she started at odds of 16/5 and won by one and three quarter lengths from Wild Mia. Racing over the same course and distance, she won the Clockers Corner Handicap in February and then switched to dirt to win the Las Cienagas Handicap in April. In May she sustained her only defeat of the season when she finished second to Mega Dream in the Great Lady M Stakes, conceding six pounds to the five-year-old winner.

The filly was off the course for more than five months before reappearing in the Breeders' Cup Turf Sprint at Santa Anita on November 3. Ridden by Mike Smith she started at odds of 7/1 in a field of fourteen, with the three-year-old colt Unbridled's Note being made the 9/2 favorite. She was among the back markers for most of the way before moving five wide on the final turn to deliver her challenge in the straight. Midirection produced a strong late run on the outside to catch Unbridled's Note in the closing stages and won by half a length.

=== 2013: five-year-old season ===
As in the previous season, Mizdirection began her 2013 campaign in the Monrovia Stakes and won the race for a second time, beating Kindle by half a length, taking her career earnings past $1,000,000. In February, the mare was moved up in distance for the Grade II Buena Vista Stakes over one mile at Santa Anita. Ridden by Smith, she led from the start and won comfortably by 2 1/4 lengths from the Brazilian mare In The Stars. The Las Cienagas Handicap was upgraded to Grade III in 2013, and Mizdirection won the race for the second time, beating her stable companion Schiaparelli by half a length. In June the mare was sent to the East Coast for the first time when she contested the Just A Game Stakes over one mile at Belmont Park. She led until the straight but faded in the closing stage, finishing fifth of the six runners behind Stephanie's Kitten.

Mizdirection returned to California, and defended her Breeders' Cup Turf Sprint title at Santa Anita on November 2. Ridden by Smith, she started the 2.7/1 favorite ahead of Reneesgotzip, Unbridled's Note and Chips All In. She was ridden closer to the pace than in the previous year and turned into the straight in third place before making her challenge on the outside. She took the lead 50 yards from the finish and won by half a length from Reneesgotzip and the outsider Tightend Touchdown, who dead-heated for second place.

Shortly thereafter, she was retired and shipped to Lexington to be sold in the Fasig-Tipton sale. Two days after her Breeders' Cup win was, Mizdirection was purchased for $2.7 million by Al Shaqab Racing of Qatar, owned by Sheikh Joaan Al Thani, and the horse will become a broodmare.

Mizdirection finished runner-up to Groupie Doll in the voting for American Champion Female Sprint Horse.

== Breeding career ==
Mizdirection was retired from racing in late 2013. Sold to Al Shaqab Racing for $2.7 million at the 2013 Fasig-Tipton November sale, she was exported to France and now lives at the Haras de Bouquetot near Clarbec. She produced a colt by New Approach in 2015 and was bred to Olympic Glory for the 2016 season.

== Pedigree ==
Pedigree of Mizdirection (USA), gray mare, 2008
Sire Mizzen Mast (USA) 1998	Cozzene (USA); 1980	Caro	Fortino
Sire Mizzen Mast (USA) 1998	Cozzene (USA); 1980	Caro	Chambord
Sire Mizzen Mast (USA) 1998	Cozzene (USA); 1980	Ride the Trails	Prince John
Sire Mizzen Mast (USA) 1998	Cozzene (USA); 1980	Ride the Trails	Wildwook
Sire Mizzen Mast (USA) 1998	Kinema (USA); 1983	Graustark	Ribot
Sire Mizzen Mast (USA) 1998	Kinema (USA); 1983	Graustark	Flower Bowl
Sire Mizzen Mast (USA) 1998	Kinema (USA); 1983	Mrs Peterkin	Tom Fool
Sire Mizzen Mast (USA) 1998	Kinema (USA); 1983	Mrs Peterkin	Legendra
Dam Deceptive (USA) 1999	Clever Trick (USA); 1976	Icecapade	Nearctic
Dam Deceptive (USA) 1999	Clever Trick (USA); 1976	Icecapade	Shenanigans
Dam Deceptive (USA) 1999	Clever Trick (USA); 1976	Kankakee Miss	Better Bee
Dam Deceptive (USA) 1999	Clever Trick (USA); 1976	Kankakee Miss	Golden Beach
Dam Deceptive (USA) 1999	Subtle Wave (USA); 1993	Wavering Monarch	Majestic Light
Dam Deceptive (USA) 1999	Subtle Wave (USA); 1993	Wavering Monarch	Uncommitted
Dam Deceptive (USA) 1999	Subtle Wave (USA); 1993	Limbus	Silver Buck
Dam Deceptive (USA) 1999	Subtle Wave (USA); 1993	Limbus	Lien (Family 9)
