= Breeders' Cup Turf Sprint =

American Thoroughbred horse race

- The 2008 Breeders' Cup Turf Sprint
- Class: Grade I
- Location: United States
- Inaugurated: 2008
- Race type: Thoroughbred – Flat racing
- Website: Official Breeders' Cup website

Race information
- Distance: from 5 furlongs (0.63 mi) to 6.5 furlongs (0.81 mi)
- Surface: Turf
- Track: Left-handed
- Qualification: Three-years-old & up
- Weight: Weight for Age
- Purse: US$1,000,000

The Breeders' Cup Turf Sprint is a Weight for Age stakes race for thoroughbred racehorses three years old and up. As its name implies, it is a part of the Breeders' Cup World Championships, the de facto year-end championship for North American thoroughbred racing. The distance of the race will vary depending on the host track's turf course requirements.

The race was run for the first time in 2008 during the second day of Breeders' Cup racing at that year's host track, Santa Anita Park. The 2008 race was held at a distance of 6 1/2 furlongs and was contested on Santa Anita's signature El Camino Real "downhill" turf course. Besides Santa Anita, the only tracks in North America capable of contesting turf sprints at 6 1/2 furlongs are Woodbine and Belmont. Churchill Downs, which has hosted the Breeders' Cup eight times, can only conduct turf sprints at five furlongs. The 2015 race at Keeneland was held at approximately 5 1/2 furlongs.

Because of technical requirements, it was not eligible for classification as a graded stakes race in its first two runnings. Starting in 2010, it was a Grade II race, and was upgraded to Grade I for 2012.

== Automatic berths ==
Beginning in 2007, the Breeders' Cup developed the Breeders' Cup Challenge, a series of races in each division that allotted automatic qualifying bids to winners of defined races. Each of the fourteen divisions has multiple qualifying races. Note though that one horse may win multiple challenge races, while other challenge winners will not be entered in the Breeders' Cup for a variety of reasons such as injury or travel considerations.

In the Turf Sprint division, runners are limited to 12 or 14 (depending on the dimensions of the host track and there are up to seven automatic berths. The 2022 "Win and You're In" races were:

1. the Jaipur Invitational, a Grade I race run in June at Belmont Park in New York
2. the King's Stand Stakes, a Group 1 race run in June at Royal Ascot in England
3. the Nunthorpe Stakes, a Group 1 race run in August at York Racecourse in England
4. the Green Flash Handicap, a stakes race run in September at Del Mar in California
5. the Kentucky Downs Turf Sprint Stakes, a Grade III race run in September at Kentucky Downs in Kentucky
6. the Flying Five Stakes, a Group 1 race run in September at Curragh Racecourse in Ireland
7. the Prix de l'Abbaye de Longchamp, a Group 1 race run in October at Longchamp in France

== Records ==
Most wins:

- 2 – Mizdirection (2012, 2013)
- 2 – Stormy Liberal (2017, 2018)

Most wins by a jockey:

- 2 – Mike Smith (2012, 2013)
- 2 – Joel Rosario (2014, 2017)
- 2 – Irad Ortiz Jr. (2021, 2025)

Most wins by a trainer:

- 3 – Peter Miller (2017, 2018, 2019)
- 2 – Mike Puype (2012, 2013)

Most wins by an owner:

- 2 – Jungle Racing/KMN Racing et al. (2012, 2013)
- 2 – Rockingham Ranch (2017, 2018)

== Winners ==
Year	Winner	Age	Jockey	Trainer	Owner	Distance	Time	Purse	Grade
2026	Bacio	3	Juan Hernandez	Wesley Ward	MyRacehorse, Torie Gladwell, Deja Blu Stable, Jacob Shockley, Knollwood Stables, Valerie Dailey and Joshua Hanna	5 1/2 f	1:02.11	$1,000,000	I
2025	Shisospicy	3	Irad Ortiz Jr.	Jose Francisco D'Angelo	Morplay Racing & Qatar Racing	5 f	0:55.24	$1,000,000	I
2024	Starlust	3	Rossa Ryan	Ralph Beckett	Fitri Hay	5 f	0:55.92	$1,000,000	I
2023	Nobals	4	Gerardo Corrales	Larry Rivelli	Patricia's Hope	5 f	0:55.15	$1,000,000	I
2022	Caravel	5	Tyler Gaffalione	Brad H. Cox	Qatar Racing, Marc Detampel, & Madaket Stables	5 1/2 f	1:01.79	$1,000,000	I
2021	Golden Pal	3	Irad Ortiz Jr.	Wesley Ward	Derrick Smith, Susan Magnier, Michael Tabor & Westerberg (Georg von Opel)	5 f	0:55.22	$1,000,000	I
2020	Glass Slippers (GB)	4	Tom Eaves	Kevin Ryan	Bearstone Stud (Terry & Margaret Holdcroft)	5 1/2 f	1:01.53	$1,000,000	I
2019	Belvoir Bay (GB)	6	Javier Castellano	Peter Miller	Gary Barber	5 f	0:54.83	$1,000,000	I
2018	Stormy Liberal	6	Drayden Van Dyke	Peter Miller	Rockingham Ranch (Gary Hartunian)	5 1/2 f	1:04.50	$1,000,000	I
2017	Stormy Liberal	5	Joel Rosario	Peter Miller	Rockingham Ranch (Gary Hartunian)	5 f	0:56.12	$1,000,000	I
2016	Obviously (IRE)	8	Flavien Prat	Philip D'Amato	Anthony Fanticola & Joseph Scardino	abt. 6 1/2 f	1:11.33	$1,000,000	I
2015	Mongolian Saturday	5	Florent Geroux	Enebish Ganbat	Mongolian Stable (Ganbaatar Dagvadorj)	abt. 5 1/2 f	1:03.19	$1,000,000	I
2014	Bobby's Kitten	3	Joel Rosario	Chad C. Brown	Ken & Sarah Ramsey	abt. 6 1/2 f	1:12.73	$1,000,000	I
2013	Mizdirection	5	Mike Smith	Mike Puype	Jungle Racing & KMN Racing et al.	abt. 6 1/2 f	1:12.25	$1,000,000	I
2012	Mizdirection	4	Mike Smith	Mike Puype	Jungle Racing & KMN Racing et al.	abt. 6 1/2 f	1:11.39	$1,000,000	I
2011	Regally Ready	4	Corey Nakatani	Steve Asmussen	Vinery Stable	5 f	0:56.48	$1,000,000	II
2010	Chamberlain Bridge	6	Jamie Theriot	Bret Calhoun	Carl Moore Management	5 f	0:56.53	$1,000,000	II
2009	California Flag	5	Joe Talamo	Brian Koriner	Hi Card Ranch (Keith Card)	abt. 6 1/2 f	1:11.28	$1,000,000	
2008	Desert Code	4	Richard Migliore	David Hofmans	Tarabilla Farms (Susan Osborne)	abt. 6 1/2 f	1:11.60	$1,000,000	

== See also ==
- Breeders' Cup Turf Sprint "top three finishers" and starters
- Breeders' Cup World Thoroughbred Championships
- American thoroughbred racing top attended events
