= 2014 Breeders' Cup =

Thoroughbred horse racing event

The 2014 Breeders' Cup World Championships was the 31st edition of the premier event of the North American thoroughbred horse racing year. It took place on October 31 and November 1 at Santa Anita Park in Arcadia, California. The Breeders' Cup is generally regarded as the end of the North American racing season, although a few Grade I events take place in later November and December. The 2014 Breeders' Cup results were highly influential in the Eclipse Award divisional championship voting.

== Breeders' Cup Challenge series ==
The Breeders' Cup Challenge is a series of races that provide the winners of designated races with automatic "Win and You're In" berths in a specified division of the Breeders' Cup. For qualifying horses, the Breeders' Cup organization covers the entry fee and provides a travel allowance of up to $40,000 for the connections of horses from overseas. In 2014, thirty-seven horses entered in the Breeders' Cup races qualified via the challenge series, including four of the winners. These were:

- Bayern, who qualified for the Classic by winning the Haskell Invitational
- Main Sequence, who won the Joe Hirsch Turf Classic to qualify for the Turf
- Work All Week, who earned his berth in the Sprint by winning the Phoenix Stakes
- Goldencents, who won the Pat O'Brien Handicap to qualify for the Dirt Mile

The 2014 Breeders' Cup races were missing several prominent horses due to injury or illness. Most notably, American Pharoah, favored in the Juvenile after winning the FrontRunner Stakes, missed the race due to a bruise to the left front hoof. Similarly, Wise Dan, two-time winner of the Mile, qualified for the third time by winning the Shadwell Turf Mile but suffered a non-displaced fracture in his right foreleg. Beholder qualified in the Zenyatta but came down with an illness and missed the chance to defend her Distaff title.

== Results ==
The two-day attendance for the 2014 Breeders' Cup was 98,319, up 4% over the 2013 attendance and the highest total for the renewals held at Santa Anita since the event expanded to two days. A total of $159.1 million was bet over the two days, the fourth highest in Breeders' Cup history and up 1.1% from 2013. 159 horses started in the 13 races, including 26 from overseas.

The Breeders' Cup Classic became the subject of great controversy when the eventual winner, Bayern, broke rapidly from the gate and "took a hard left turn" toward the rail, bumping the favorite Shared Belief in the process. Knocked off stride, Shared Belief in turn stumbled into Moreno, who had been expected to challenge Bayern for the early lead: Moreno lost his footing and never challenged. Bayern got an uncontested lead and was able to relax while setting a reasonable pace. For most of the race, he was followed by Toast of New York, who had also bumped into both Shared Belief and Moreno while moving into position. California Chrome was not involved in the contact, racing on the outside behind the early leaders. He started to close as they entered the stretch but could not get by: Bayern won by a nose over Toast of New York with California Chrome a neck back. Shared Belief closed ground late to finish fourth. After a 10-minute inquiry, the stewards decided to let the results stand, explaining later that the rules in California made the decision subjective, requiring them to determine if the foul affected the result of the race. "We all agreed there was interference, no question, Bayern broke in. Three or four horses suffered interference," said steward Scott Chaney. "Did it change the outcome? Any interference could. At the start of a mile-and-a-quarter race we're really loathe to make a change. You really don't want us handicapping the race." Many still disagreed with the decision. Shared Belief's part-owner, Jim Rome said, "The message is pretty much that you can commit a foul at the beginning of a race. But that can be extremely dangerous to horse and jockey." The controversy overshadowed the performances of the top finishers, who ran the 1 1/4-mile race in 1:59.88.

The other races provided several other highlights. Main Sequence remained undefeated since moving from Europe to North America by winning the Turf, his fourth straight Grade I win. Karakontie became the first Japanese-bred horse to win at the Breeders' Cup when he won the Mile by a length over Anodin, a full brother to three-time Mile winner Goldikova. In the Juvenile Turf, Bobby's Kitten was in last place with 200 yards remaining but closed rapidly to win in a photo finish. After Untapable won the Distaff, jockey Rosie Napravnik announced that she (Napravnik) was expecting a baby and would retire from racing after completing the Saturday card. And in the Juvenile Fillies, Take Charge Brandi provided the biggest upset of the weekend when she won at odds of 61-1.

In the 2014 Eclipse Award voting, seven of the eleven flat racing categories were awarded to horses who won at the Breeders' Cup: Take Charge Brandi (Champion Two-Year-Old Filly), Untapable (Champion Three-Year-Old Filly), Main Sequence (Champion Older Male and Champion Male Turf Horse), Work All Week (Champion Male Sprinter), Judy the Beauty (Champion Female Sprinter and Dayatthespa (Champion Female Turf Horse).

== Friday, October 31 ==
The winners for the Friday races were as follows:

Race name	Sponsor	Distance/Surface	Restrictions	Purse	Winner (Bred)
Juvenile Turf		1 mile (Turf)	2-year-old colts & geldings	$1 million	Hootenanny
Dirt Mile		1 mile (one turn)	3 yrs+	$1 million	Goldencents
Juvenile Fillies Turf		1 mile (Turf)	2-year-old fillies	$1 million	Lady Eli
Distaff	Longines	1 1/8 miles (1.8 km)	3 yrs+ fillies & mares	$2 million	Untapable

== Saturday, November 1 ==
The winners for the Saturday races were as follows:

Race Name	Sponsor	Distance/Surface	Restrictions	Purse	Winner (Bred)
Juvenile Fillies	14 Hands Winery	1 1/16 miles (1.7 km)	2-year-old fillies	$2 million	Take Charge Brandi
Filly & Mare Turf		1 1/4 miles (2.0 km) (Turf)	Fillies & mares	$2 million	Dayatthespa
Filly & Mare Sprint	DraftKings	7/8 mile (1.4 km)	3 yrs+ fillies & mares	$1 million	Judy the Beauty
Turf Sprint		About 13/16 mile (1.3 km) (Turf)	3 yrs+	$1 million	Bobby's Kitten
Juvenile	Sentient Jet	1 1/16 miles (1.7 km)	2-year-old colts & geldings	$2 million	Texas Red
Turf	Longines	1 1/2 miles (2.4 km) (Turf)	3 yrs+	$3 million	Main Sequence
Sprint	Xpressbet	3/4 mile (1.2 km)	3 yrs+	$1,500,000	Work All Week
Mile		1 mile (Turf)	3 yrs+	$2 million	Karakontie (JPN)
Classic		1 1/4 miles (2.0 km)	3 yrs+	$5 million	Bayern
