= Bayern (horse) =

American-bred Thoroughbred racehorse (2011–2026)

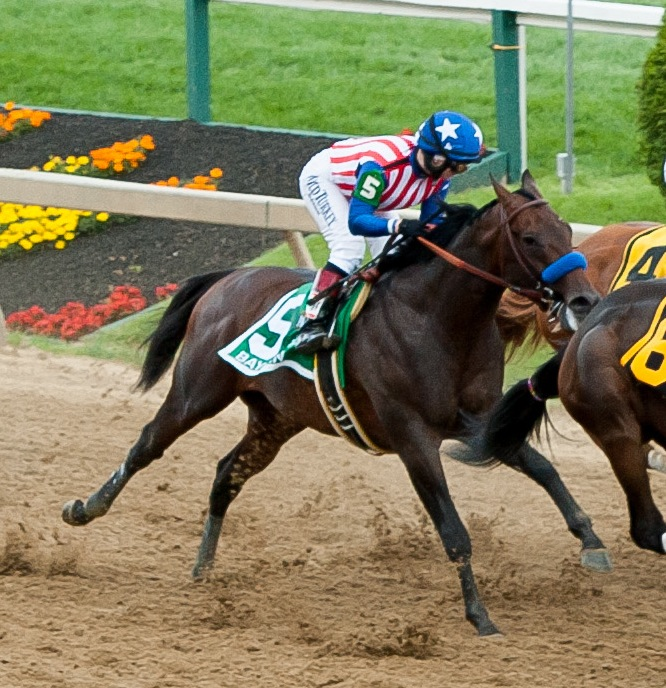
- Bayern in the 2014 Preakness Stakes
- Sire: Offlee Wild
- Grandsire: Wild Again
- Dam: Alittlebitearly
- Damsire: Thunder Gulch
- Sex: Stallion
- Foaled: May 3, 2011
- Died: July 5, 2026 (aged 15)
- Country: United States
- Color: Bay
- Breeder: Helen Alexander
- Owner: Kaleem Shah
- Trainer: Bob Baffert
- Record: 13:6-1-2
- Earnings: $4,418,680

Major wins
- Woody Stephens Stakes (2014); William Hill Haskell Invitational Stakes (2014); Pennsylvania Derby (2014); Breeders' Cup wins: Breeders' Cup Classic (2014)

Bayern (May 3, 2011 – July 5, 2026) was an American Thoroughbred racehorse. In 2014, he won the Grade I 2014 Breeders' Cup Classic, following wins in the Haskell Invitational and the Pennsylvania Derby. He was owned by Kaleem Shah, who purchased him as a two-year-old, based upon the advice of his teenaged son. He was named after Shah's favorite soccer team, FC Bayern Munich. The horse was trained by Bob Baffert, and was retired in 2015.

== Background ==
Bayern was a bay ridgling bred in Kentucky by Helen Alexander. His sire, Offlee Wild, was a successful racehorse whose wins included the Massachusetts Handicap in 2004 (beating Funny Cide) and the Suburban Handicap in 2005. Before Bayern, the best of his progeny was Breeders' Cup Juvenile Fillies winner She Be Wild. As of 2014, Offlee Wild stands at the Pin Oak Lane Farm in Pennsylvania. Bayern's dam Alittlebitearly was born prematurely on December 14, 2002, which made her almost useless for racing purposes. The age of a Thoroughbred racehorse born in the Northern Hemisphere advances by one year on January 1, meaning that Alittlebitearly officially became a yearling when less than a month old and, if raced, would have had to compete on level terms with horses who could be up to 11 months older.

His owner Kaleem Shah obtained the horse as a two-year-old at a training sale when his teenaged son, Arman, was impressed with the colt. Bayern was originally named "Tahrir Square" when he was sold to Shah, but he was renamed after the association football (soccer) team FC Bayern Munich, the favorite team of his owner. His name is pronounced by track announcers and the US press as "BY-earn."(German pronunciation: [ˈbaɪ.ɐn])

== Racing career ==
=== 2014: three-year-old season ===
Bayern was unraced as a two-year-old and made his racecourse debut in a maiden race over seven furlongs at Santa Anita Park on January 4, 2014. Ridden by Gary Stevens, he took the lead on the turn into the stretch and drew away to win by 3 1/4 lengths from Rprettyboyfloyd [sic]. He reappeared over one mile at the same track in February and started as the 3-5 favorite against four opponents. He took the lead soon after the start and steadily increased his advantage to win by 15 lengths. The colt was then moved up sharply in class to contest the Grade I Arkansas Derby at Oaklawn Park on April 12. He took the lead from the start before being overtaken in the straight and finishing third behind Danza and Ride On Curlin. Rosie Napravnik was his jockey when Bayern contested the Derby Trial Stakes at Churchill Downs two weeks later. He led from the start and prevailed by a nose over Embellishing Bob but was demoted to second for causing interference to the runner-up. On May 17, the colt was moved up to the highest level for the second leg of the Triple Crown, the Preakness Stakes at Pimlico Race Course. Starting with Napravnik up at odds of 12.9-1, he finished tenth of the eleven runners behind Kentucky Derby winner California Chrome.

He did not contest the Belmont Stakes and was instead aimed at the seven-furlong Woody Stephens Stakes at the same meeting. Bayern contested the early lead before taking a clear advantage entering the straight and drew away in the closing stages to win by seven and a half lengths from Top Fortitude. His winning time of 1:20.75 was less than a second off the track record. Stevens returned as his jockey and said, "That was a powerhouse performance. He had a bad experience in the gate in the Preakness. Jimmy Barnes [assistant to trainer Bob Baffert] and Bob's crew did a great job getting him ready by schooling, schooling, schooling him." Bayern was moved back up in class and distance for the Grade I Haskell Invitational over nine furlongs at Monmouth Park on July 27. Ridden for the first time by Martin Garcia, he was the second choice in the betting behind the filly Untapable. Garcia took the lead from the start and set a steady pace before drawing away in the straight to win by more than seven lengths from Albano, with Untapable in fifth place. Baffert, who won the race for a record seventh time, watched the running on television. After the race, the trainer, who said that he had considered keeping the horse to sprint distances, stated, "We tried to slow him down in the past, but now we know we just have to utilize his speed. I didn't think he'd do it as devastating as that. It looks like he has it all together now."

On August 27, Bayern was the favorite for the Travers Stakes at Saratoga Race Course against a field which included Belmont Stakes winner Tonalist, Kentucky Derby runner-up Commanding Curve, and Wood Memorial Stakes winner Wicked Strong, who had defeated Tonalist in the Jim Dandy Stakes. Bayern started quickly and set a strong pace against Tonalist but weakened badly in the stretch and was eased down by Garcia in the closing stages, finishing last of the ten runners behind the upset winner, V. E. Day. On September 20, Bayern ran in the Pennsylvania Derby over nine furlongs at Parx, a race that featured the return of California Chrome, running for the first time since his defeat in the Belmont. As in the Haskell, Bayern broke quickly and set a steady pace before picking up the pace on the final turn. He increased his advantage in the straight to win by 5 3/4 lengths with a track record time of 1:46.96. Tapiture finished second, and California Chrome was sixth. Baffert commented, "That was just a powerful performance... When Bayern runs like that, nobody's going to beat him." In the wake of his performance, recognizing the retirement of the successful Game On Dude two days prior, news stories noted that Baffert's nickname for Bayern was "Little Dude", recognizing that both had a front-running style but also fared poorly when unable to control the pace from the lead. Bayern came out of the race in good shape, and Baffert stated that he would contest the Breeders' Cup Classic.

On November 1, Bayern started at odds of 6.1/1 for the 31st running of the Breeders' Cup Classic at Santa Anita Park. His opponents included the undefeated gelding Shared Belief, California Chrome, and Tonalist in a field that appeared dominated by three-year-olds. Exiting the gate, Bayern veered sharply to the left, badly hampering Shared Belief and Moreno before taking the early lead. He was tracked throughout the race by the British-trained Toast of New York with California Chrome close behind and maintained his advantage into the straight. In a closely contested three-way finish, Bayern prevailed by a nose from Toast of New York and a neck from third-place California Chrome. Next to finish were Shared Belief, Tonalist, and Candy Boy, meaning that the first six places were filled by three-year-olds. The racecourse stewards conducted an inquiry into the interference caused by Bayern at the start but allowed the result to stand. After the race, Garcia said, "It's an amazing feeling, a dream come true... We let him run, and if anything happens, you make adjustments. In this race, he broke really good and I took advantage. I was pretty sure that I didn't do anything. In racing, these things happen."

=== 2015: four-year-old season ===
Bayern's return was delayed by a foot abscess that interrupted his training schedule in early 2015. He began the season with a drop back in distance as he contested the Churchill Downs Stakes on the Kentucky Derby undercard on May 2. He never reached the lead and finished last of the six runners behind Private Zone. In the Metropolitan Handicap at Belmont on 6 June, he finished last of the ten runners, twenty-nine lengths behind the winner Honor Code. He was dropped back to Grade II level in July and started favorite under top weight of 123 pounds in the San Diego Handicap at Del Mar Racetrack. He produced a somewhat improved effort to finish third behind the Argentinian-bred Catch A Flight. In August, he contested the Pacific Classic but though he led in the initial stages of the race, he faded after being passed on the turn by Beholder and finished ninth of 10 horses. Bayern finished third in the Awesome Again Stakes at Santa Anita to Smooth Roller, prompting discussion of whether he would be retired, with an announcement of his retirement in the days that followed.

== Stallion career ==
Bayern entered stud at Hill 'N' Dale Farms in Kentucky. His 2017 stud fee was $15,000. In 2021, Bayern was sold to Dr. Sangil Choi of South Korea and moved to stand at Choi's Great Hill Farm in that country.

=== Notable progeny ===
c = colt, f = filly, g = gelding

| Foaled | Name | Sex | Major Wins |
|---|---|---|---|
| 2018 | Raon The Fighter | c | KRA Cup Classic |
| 2020 | Speed Boat Beach | c | Malibu Stakes |

== Death ==
Bayern died in South Korea on July 5, 2026, at the age of 15, due to complications from hernia surgery. His death was announced by Great Hill Farm two days later.

== Assessment and awards ==
In the Eclipse Awards for 2014, Bayern finished runner-up to California Chrome in the voting for American Champion Three-Year-Old Male Horse and third behind California Chrome and Main Sequence in the American Horse of the Year poll.

In the 2014 World's Best Racehorse Rankings, published in January 2015, Bayern was rated the best horse trained in the United States, and the ninth-best racehorse in the world.

== Pedigree ==
Pedigree of Bayern (USA), bay or brown colt, 2011
| Sire Offlee Wild (USA) 2000 | Wild Again (USA); 1980 | Icecapade | Nearctic |
| Sire Offlee Wild (USA) 2000 | Wild Again (USA); 1980 | Icecapade | Shenanigans |
| Sire Offlee Wild (USA) 2000 | Wild Again (USA); 1980 | Bushel-n-Peck | Khaled |
| Sire Offlee Wild (USA) 2000 | Wild Again (USA); 1980 | Bushel-n-Peck | Dama |
| Sire Offlee Wild (USA) 2000 | Alvear (USA); 1989 | Seattle Slew | Bold Reasoning |
| Sire Offlee Wild (USA) 2000 | Alvear (USA); 1989 | Seattle Slew | My Charmer |
| Sire Offlee Wild (USA) 2000 | Alvear (USA); 1989 | Andover Way | His Majesty |
| Sire Offlee Wild (USA) 2000 | Alvear (USA); 1989 | Andover Way | On The Trail |
| Dam Alittlebitearly (USA) 2002 | Thunder Gulch (USA); 1992 | Gulch | Mr Prospector |
| Dam Alittlebitearly (USA) 2002 | Thunder Gulch (USA); 1992 | Gulch | Jameela |
| Dam Alittlebitearly (USA) 2002 | Thunder Gulch (USA); 1992 | Line of Thunder | Storm Bird |
| Dam Alittlebitearly (USA) 2002 | Thunder Gulch (USA); 1992 | Line of Thunder | Shoot A Line |
| Dam Alittlebitearly (USA) 2002 | Aquilegia (USA); 1989 | Alydar | Raise A Native |
| Dam Alittlebitearly (USA) 2002 | Aquilegia (USA); 1989 | Alydar | Sweet Tooth |
| Dam Alittlebitearly (USA) 2002 | Aquilegia (USA); 1989 | Courtly Dee | Never Bend |
| Dam Alittlebitearly (USA) 2002 | Aquilegia (USA); 1989 | Courtly Dee | Tulle (family A4) |
