= Toast of New York =

Thoroughbred racehorse

- Racing silks of Al Shaqab
- Sire: Thewayyouare
- Grandsire: Kingmambo
- Dam: Claire Soleil
- Damsire: Syncline
- Sex: Gelding
- Foaled: 5 April 2011
- Country: United States
- Colour: Bay
- Breeder: Ashleigh Stud, Frank Ramos & Jackie Ramos
- Owner: Michael Buckley; Sheikh Joaan al Thani, Al Shaqab Racing, Daniel "Danny" Lee
- Trainer: Jamie Osborne
- Record: 13: 4-4-1
- Earnings: £1,942,759

Major wins
- UAE Derby (2014)

Toast of New York (foaled 5 April 2011) is an American-bred, British-trained Thoroughbred racehorse. As a two-year-old, he was beaten in his first two races but then won two races on the synthetic track at Wolverhampton Racecourse by an aggregate margin of twenty-eight lengths. As a three-year-old, he won the UAE Derby in Dubai and was then campaigned in the United States. He finished second to Shared Belief the Pacific Classic before producing his most notable performance when beaten a nose by Bayern in the $5 million Breeders' Cup Classic. He sustained an injury which prevented a planned run in the 2015 Dubai World Cup and was retired to stud in Qatar. He returned to racing after a three-year gap in November 2017 and won a minor conditions race on his reappearance.

== Background ==
Toast of New York is a bay horse with a white blaze and four white socks bred in Kentucky by Ashleigh Stud, Jackie Ward Ramos. He was from the first crop of foals sired by Thewayyouare, a horse who showed his best form when trained by André Fabre in France as a two-year-old, winning four consecutive races including the Critérium de Saint-Cloud. Toast of New York's dam, Claire Soleil finished unplaced in all three of her races. She was, however, a daughter of the racemare Claire Marine, whose wins included the Beverly Hills Handicap, Beverly D. Stakes and Matriarch Stakes.

Toast of New York was sold twice as a yearling in 2012. In January, he was consigned by the Hunter Valley Farm to the Keeneland Association sale, where he was purchased for $35,000 by Tim Hyde. The horse was exported to Hyde's Camas Park Stud in Cashel, County Tipperary, and auctioned at the Goffs Orby Yearling sale in October being bought for €60,000 by trainer Jamie Osborne on behalf of Michael Buckley.

== Racing career ==
=== 2013: two-year-old season ===
Toast of New York began his racing career in August, contesting two maiden races. He finished fifth when a 66/1 outsider over seven furlongs on turf at Leicester and second over a mile on the Polytrack synthetic surface at Kempton Park Racecourse. In the latter, in which he was ridden for the first time by Jamie Spencer, he was beaten a neck by Tom Tug after his bit slipped out of his mouth in the closing stages.

The colt's other two races of 2013 took place on the Tapeta surface at Wolverhampton Racecourse. On 13 September, ridden by Spencer, he started 1/3 favourite for an eight and a half furlong maiden race and recorded his first success, leading from the start and winning by twelve lengths. In November, he was brought back in distance for a race over seven furlongs in which he was ridden by Adam Kirby. Starting the 10/11 favourite, he went to the front from the start and accelerated away from his five opponents to win by sixteen lengths from the filly Inyordreams.

=== 2014: three-year-old season ===
After racing exclusively in England as a two-year-old, Toast of New York was campaigned internationally in 2014. Early in the year, he was sent to the United Arab Emirates to contest the UAE Derby over nine and a half furlongs on the Tapeta surface at Meydan Racecourse on 29 March. Ridden by Spencer, he started at odds of 11/1 behind the Australian-bred Godolphin representative Long John, the Aidan O'Brien-trained Giovanni Boldini, and Asmar, an Irish-trained colt based in Bahrain. After tracking the leaders for most of the way, Toast of New York took the lead two furlongs out and won by two and a half lengths from Asmar.

In the summer of 2014, Toast of New York was sent to the United States, making his American debut in the Grade I Belmont Derby (formerly the Jamaica Handicap) over ten furlongs on turf at Belmont Park on 5 July. The 9/2 third favourite behind Adelaide and Bobby's Kitten, he started poorly before making progress a quarter of a mile from the finish but faded in the closing stages to finish sixth of the ten runners behind the 23.5/1 outsider Mr Speaker. In the following month, he was sent to California and matched against older horses for the first time when he contested the Grade I Pacific Classic on the Polytrack surface at Del Mar. Ridden by Victor Espinoza, he was third choice in the betting behind the undefeated three-year-old gelding Shared Belief and the multiple Grade I-winning veteran Game On Dude. After racing just behind the leaders, the colt moved into second place behind Game On Dude approaching the final turn. At the entrance to the straight, he moved up to challenge the leader but was overtaken by Shared Belief and appeared to be hampered when the new leader cut in to the left. He finished second, two and three quarter lengths behind Shared Belief and two and a quarter lengths clear of the other eight runners. After the race, Osborne said, "He ran a great race, the race of his life. No hard feelings. The first two horses were the best. The winner may be the best three-year-old anywhere. My horse stepped up quite a bit from his win in the UAE Derby".

On 1 November, Toast of New York was the only international entrant for the thirty-first running of the Breeders' Cup Classic on the dirt track at Santa Anita Park. He started at odds of 12/1 behind the American three-year-olds Shared Belief, Tonalist, California Chrome, and Bayern. Toast of New York tracked the leader, Bayern, throughout the race before making a strong challenge in the straight. He reduced Bayern's advantage throughout the closing stages but failed by a nose to overhaul the American colt, with California Chrome finishing a neck away in third and Shared Belief a further three and a half lengths away in fourth. Following an inquiry by the racecourse stewards into interference caused when Bayern veered left at the start, the result was allowed to stand. Immediately after the race, Osborne said, "Toast of New York has run his heart out and he nearly pulled off the impossible. I'm incredibly proud of him and all the team. Yes, it hurts to come second. It would have been wonderful for Jamie to have pulled off a Breeders' Cup Classic on his last ride."

On the day after the race, Osborne announced his plans for the colt's future, saying, "He has the potential to be one of the highest-earning horses in the world. He's never going to run for less than a million, and I can't see him running in England. We'll choose our targets, and if he runs three or four times a year for the next two years and every time he runs for a few million in prize-money, that would do".

=== 2015: four-year-old season ===
In early 2015 Toast of New York was purchased by Sheikh Joaan Al Thani's Al Shaqab Racing operation. He was aimed at the Dubai World Cup at Meydan but was withdrawn from the race after sustaining a soft tissue injury in early March. He did not race again in 2015 and in November he was retired to stand at stud in Qatar from 2016.

=== 2017: six-year-old season ===
Toast of New York returned to the UK in early 2017 to be assessed for a return to racing. He had been unable to cover many mares at stud due to the small nature of Qatar's breeding industry and Al Shaqab's racing manager, Harry Herbert, announced that the horse was being looked by veterinary staff and would return to Jamie Osborne's stable if the assessment showed he could return to training. Toast of New York returned to Osborne's stable in March and by the end of November he was ready to return to racing. The trainer stated that the horse had been entered in a minor race at Lingfield Park in early December and said "He's six, but he's only had eight runs in his life, so let's have a go with him... It's inevitable he will be rusty, but we’ve tried to do as much work as we can with him. He's been a life-changing horse for me, to this point, and to get another chance to train him is wonderful." He made his comeback in the ten-furlong Betway Conditions Stakes at Lingfield on 6 December, ridden by Dettori, and won by a length at odds of 2-1 from the favourite, Petite Jack. Dettori said "Jamie has done a great job to get him in this shape first time out. He still feels a little rusty, but after three years off I can't emphasise enough how brilliant everyone has been to get him back. He's only 70% at the moment, but he still won."

=== 2018: seven-year-old season ===
Less than two months after his comeback win Toast of New York contested the second running of the Pegasus World Cup at Gulfstream Park in January 2018 and finished tailed-off last of the twelve runners behind Gun Runner. After yet another lengthy absence Toast of New York returned in the Grade III Lukas Classic Stakes over nine furlongs at Churchill Downs in September in which he was partnered by Julien Leparoux. He stayed on well in the straight without ever looking likely to win and came home second of the eight runners behind Mind Your Biscuits. At the same track on 2 November he contested the Marathon Stakes in which he was again ridden by Leparoux and started the 9/2 second favourite. He "plugged on" in the straight to finish fourth behind the favoured Rocketry. He then returned to England and finished a closed third behind Mango Tango and Scarlet Dragon in a minor race at Lingfield on 5 December. His retirement was announced in April 2019.

== Pedigree ==
Pedigree of Toast of New York (USA), bay colt, 2011
Sire Thewayyouare (USA) 2005	Kingmambo (USA); 1990	Mr. Prospector	Raise a Native
Sire Thewayyouare (USA) 2005	Kingmambo (USA); 1990	Mr. Prospector	Gold Digger
Sire Thewayyouare (USA) 2005	Kingmambo (USA); 1990	Miesque	Nureyev
Sire Thewayyouare (USA) 2005	Kingmambo (USA); 1990	Miesque	Pasadoble
Sire Thewayyouare (USA) 2005	Maryinsky (IRE); 1999	Sadler's Wells	Northern Dancer†
Sire Thewayyouare (USA) 2005	Maryinsky (IRE); 1999	Sadler's Wells	Fairy Bridge
Sire Thewayyouare (USA) 2005	Maryinsky (IRE); 1999	Blush With Pride	Blushing Groom
Sire Thewayyouare (USA) 2005	Maryinsky (IRE); 1999	Blush With Pride	Best In Show
Dam Claire Soleil (USA) 2004	Syncline (USA); 1997	Danzig	Northern Dancer†
Dam Claire Soleil (USA) 2004	Syncline (USA); 1997	Danzig	Pas de Nom
Dam Claire Soleil (USA) 2004	Syncline (USA); 1997	Annie Edge	Nebbiolo
Dam Claire Soleil (USA) 2004	Syncline (USA); 1997	Annie Edge	Friendly Court
Dam Claire Soleil (USA) 2004	Claire Marine (IRE); 1985	What A Guest	Be My Guest
Dam Claire Soleil (USA) 2004	Claire Marine (IRE); 1985	What A Guest	Princess Tiara
Dam Claire Soleil (USA) 2004	Claire Marine (IRE); 1985	Perle Marine	Lyphard
Dam Claire Soleil (USA) 2004	Claire Marine (IRE); 1985	Perle Marine	Valmarine (Family: 16-b)

† indicates inbreeding
