= Offlee Wild =

American-bred Thoroughbred racehorse

- Sire: Wild Again
- Grandsire: Icecapade
- Dam: Alvear
- Damsire: Seattle Slew
- Sex: Stallion
- Foaled: April 5, 2000
- Died: September 6, 2016
- Country: United States
- Colour: Dark Bay or Brown
- Breeder: Dorothy Matz
- Owner: Azalea Stables, LLC
- Trainer: Thomas Smith (2002-3); Richard E. Dutrow, Jr. (2004-5)
- Record: 19: 6-3-2
- Earnings: $976,325

Major wins
- Holy Bull Stakes (2003); Massachusetts Handicap (2004); Suburban Handicap (2005); Excelsior Breeders’ Cup Handicap (2005)
- Last updated on September 10, 2016

Offlee Wild (April 5, 2000 – September 6, 2016) was an American Thoroughbred racehorse who won multiple graded stakes races. As a sire, his most successful offspring was Breeders' Cup Classic winner Bayern.

== Background ==
Bred by Dorothy A. Matz in Kentucky, he was sired by Wild Again, who won the inaugural Breeders' Cup Classic in 1984 and became a moderately successful sire. His dam Alvear was by Seattle Slew and out of the stakes-winning mare Andover Way, who also produced leading sire Dynaformer.

Offlee Wild was purchased as a yearling at the Keeneland Sales for $325,000 by Azalea Stables, a syndicate stable headed by Lansdon Robbins. After the Jockey Club rejected several name choices, Robbins asked one of his employees for suggestions. "[The employee] said, 'We get wild now and then, how about Awfully Wild?' Well, I didn't want the word 'awful' in a horse's name, so we just changed the spelling."

== Racing career ==
Originally trained by Thomas Smith, Offlee Wild raced three times as a two-year-old, winning once. In his debut on October 6, 2002, at Keeneland, the colt dueled for the lead for the first half mile but tired as they entered the stretch, finishing fourth. On October 27 at Churchill Downs, he instead rated off the pace for the first half mile, then pulled clear to win by 5 lengths. In his next start on November 17, he finished second in an allowance race at Churchill Downs.

Offlee Wild began his three-year-old campaign in the Holy Bull Stakes on January 18, 2003, at Gulfstream Park. He was given little chance by the bettors, who dismissed him at odds of 27–1 in a field of 13 that included the then-unheralded Funny Cide. Offlee Wild broke well, settled into third place behind the early leaders, Bham and Powerful Touch, and then drew alongside them in the stretch. Bham fell back, finishing third, but Powerful Touch fought back. At the finish line, Offlee Wild won by a nose. In his first race around two turns, he earned a Beyer Speed Figure of 99. It was Robbins first stakes victory.

He finished fourth in his next start, the Fountain of Youth Stakes at Gulfstream Park on February 15. Shortly afterwards he came down with a fever of 104 °F (40 °C) and was subsequently diagnosed with a bacterial infection. Smith had planned to enter the colt in the Florida Derby in late March as a final Kentucky Derby prep, but instead switched to the Blue Grass Stakes a few weeks later where he finished third behind Peace Rules in a slowly-run race. He then finished 12th in the Kentucky Derby behind Funny Cide, and Smith gave him a few months off.

When he returned to the track in August, his losing streak continued. He ultimately lost eight races in a row, continuing into March 2004. At this point, Robbins decided to change the colt's trainer from Smith to Richard Dutrow.

"[Smith] was a 100% hay, oats and water guy," said Robbins. "He wouldn't do a lot of things other trainers would do, like using steroids, which were then legal. A lot of these trainers would use every legal avenue available, and he wouldn't even use something like GastroGard to treat ulcers. I wanted to be on a level playing field, as long as everything was legal. Offlee Wild was getting thinner and thinner and looking like a greyhound. Taking him away from [Smith] was one of the toughest decisions I ever had to make."

After switching trainers, Offlee Wild won his next start, an allowance race at Belmont Park on May 14, 2004. On June 14, he again met Funny Cide, this time in the Massachusetts Handicap at Suffolk Downs on June 19. Offlee Wild stalked behind the pace set by Funny Cide and The Lady's Groom, then moved alongside them in the stretch. The three battled to the wire, with Offlee Wild prevailing by a head. "That was one of my favorite races ever," Robbins said later. "It even made the number three SportsCenter highlight that weekend on ESPN."

Unfortunately, the colt bowed a tendon following the race, which would normally have led to the colt's retirement. Instead, Robbins offered to try a new surgical treatment performed by Dr. Larry Bramalage at Rood & Riddle Equine Hospital. After the surgery, Bramalage gave the colt a good prognosis for recovery but the discharge notes stated that he would be unlikely to return at the same level.

At age five, Offlee Wild returned to racing in the John B. Campbell Handicap at Laurel Park on February 19, 2005, finishing second. On April 2, he returned to the winner's circle with an 8 1/2 length win in the mud at Aqueduct in the Excelsior Breeders’ Cup Handicap. He then finished 6th in the Grade I Pimlico Special on May 20.

His next start was the Grade I Suburban Handicap at Belmont Park on July 2 facing a strong field that included Funny Cide, Pollard's Vision and Evening Attire. Dutrow was serving a suspension so his assistant Juan Rodriguez saddled the colt. Offlee Wild raced in fourth for much of the race, then moved to the lead in the stretch and held off a late charge to win by 1 1/4 lengths. The time was a solid 2:00.50 for 10 furlongs.

Offlee Wild raced one more time in the Saratoga Breeders' Cup Handicap but finished fifth after becoming injured.

== Stud record ==
For his first season in 2006, Offlee Wild stood at Darley at Jonabell in Kentucky, for a fee of $7,500 per live foal. He had several factors in his favor as a sire, specifically: his female family, through which he was related to leading sire Dynaformer; that he was an outcross for mares from the Mr. Prospector and Northern Dancer lines; and that he had been a "solid" racehorse.

Offlee Wild was the leading freshman sire of 2009, with his first crop headed by champion She Be Wild, winner of the 2009 Breeders' Cup Juvenile Fillies. Despite this initial success, he was not a popular sire in Kentucky with just 62 foals in his first crop, declining to just 32 by 2009. In 2012, he was moved to Pin Oak Lane Farm in Pennsylvania where his fee dropped to $4,000 live foal. In 2014, he was sold to Turkish interests, shortly after his son Bayern won the Haskell Invitational. Bayern, part of his second last crop in Kentucky, then went on to win the Breeders' Cup Classic.

Offlee Wild died on September 6, 2016, of a heart attack, suffered while walking from his stall to a paddock at the farm of his owner, Tevfik Celikoglu.

== Pedigree ==
Pedigree of Offlee Wild, dark bay or brown horse, foaled April 5, 2000
Sire Wild Again 1980	Icecapade; 1969	Nearctic	Nearco (ITY)
Sire Wild Again 1980	Icecapade; 1969	Nearctic	Lady Angela
Sire Wild Again 1980	Icecapade; 1969	Shenanigans	Native Dancer
Sire Wild Again 1980	Icecapade; 1969	Shenanigans	Bold Irish
Sire Wild Again 1980	Bushel-n-Peck; 1958	Khaled	Hyperion (GB)
Sire Wild Again 1980	Bushel-n-Peck; 1958	Khaled	Eclair (GB)
Sire Wild Again 1980	Bushel-n-Peck; 1958	Dama II	Dante (GB)
Sire Wild Again 1980	Bushel-n-Peck; 1958	Dama II	Clovelly (GB)
Dam Alvear 1989	Seattle Slew; 1974	Bold Reasoning	Boldnesian
Dam Alvear 1989	Seattle Slew; 1974	Bold Reasoning	Reason to Earn
Dam Alvear 1989	Seattle Slew; 1974	My Charmer	Poker
Dam Alvear 1989	Seattle Slew; 1974	My Charmer	Fair Charmer
Dam Alvear 1989	Andover Way; 1978	His Majesty	Ribot
Dam Alvear 1989	Andover Way; 1978	His Majesty	Flower Bowl
Dam Alvear 1989	Andover Way; 1978	On the Trail	Olympia
Dam Alvear 1989	Andover Way; 1978	On the Trail	Golden Trail
