= Thunder Road Stakes =

American Thoroughbred horse race

- Class: Grade III
- Location: Santa Anita Park; Arcadia, California, United States
- Inaugurated: 2004
- Race type: Thoroughbred - Flat racing
- Website: www.santaanita.com

Race information
- Distance: 1 mile (8 furlongs)
- Surface: Turf
- Track: Left-handed
- Qualification: Four-year-olds and older
- Weight: 124 lbs with allowances
- Purse: $100,000 (since 2014)

The Thunder Road Stakes is a Grade III American Thoroughbred horse race for horses age four and older, over a distance of 1 mile on the turf held annually in January at Santa Anita Park, Arcadia, California. The event currently carries a purse of $100,000.

== History ==
The race was inaugurated on 11 February 2004 as a handicap and was won by Singletary who was ridden by US Hall of Fame jockey Victor Espinoza by a margin of one length in a time of 1:34.42.

The event was upgraded to a Grade III event for 2009 and was switched to the artificial main track because of weather conditions.

The event was not run in 2010 or 2012.

It was downgraded to listed status for 2013 through 2015 but was upgraded back to a Grade III event in 2016. It is currently run under allowance weight conditions with a purse of $100,000.

== Records ==
Speed record:

- 1:31.78 – Tom's Tribute (2014)

Margins:

- 3 3/4 lengths – Hit the Road (2021), El Potente (2026)

Most wins:

- 2 - El Potente (2025, 2026)

Most wins by an owner:

- 2 - My Way Racing (2025, 2026)

Most wins by a jockey:

- 3 – Victor Espinoza (2004, 2006, 2015)
- 3 – Flavien Prat (2018, 2022, 2023)

Most wins by a trainer:

- 3 – Philip D'Amato (2017, 2022, 2023)
- 3 - Dan Blacker (2021, 2025, 2026)

== Winners ==
Year	Winner	Age	Jockey	Trainer	Owner	Distance	Time	Purse	Grade	Ref
Thunder Road Stakes
2026	El Potente	7	Hector Isaac Berrios	Dan Blacker	My Way Racing	1 mile	1:33.49	$100,000	III	
2025	El Potente	6	Hector Isaac Berrios	Dan Blacker	My Way Racing	1 mile	1:32.39	$102,000	III	
2024	Goliad	7	Kazushi Kimura	Richard E. Mandella	Ramona S. & Perry R. Bass II	1 mile	1:33.57	$101,000	III	
2023	Earls Rock (IRE)	5	Flavien Prat	Philip D'Amato	Anthony Fanticola	1 mile	1:34.05	$103,000	III	
2022	Count Again	7	Flavien Prat	Philip D'Amato	Agave Racing Stable & Sam-Son Farm	1 mile	1:34.12	$100,500	III	
2021	Hit the Road	5	Umberto Rispoli	Dan Blacker	D K Racing, Radley Equine, Taste of Victory Stables, Rick Gold & Dave Odmark	1 mile	1:33.35	$100,500	III	
2020	River Boyne (IRE)	5	Abel Cedillo	Jeff Mullins	Red Baron's Barn & Rancho Temescal	1 mile	1:33.78	$102,000	III	
2019	True Valour (IRE)	5	Andrea Atzeni	Simon Callaghan	Qatar Racing Limited	1 mile	1:36.35	$100,351	III	
2018	Om	6	Flavien Prat	Dan L. Hendricks	Sareen Family Trust	1 mile	1:33.54	$100,345	III	
2017	Farhaan	8	Tyler Baze	Philip D'Amato	Matthew Schera	1 mile	1:33.18	$100,690	III	
2016	What a View	5	Kent J. Desormeaux	Kenneth D. Black	Finish Line Racing, The Ellwood Johnston Trust, P. & S. Berumen	1 mile	1:39.01	$102,070	III	
2015	Talco (FR)	4	Victor Espinoza	John W. Sadler	Hronis Racing	1 mile	1:34.26	$82,000	Listed	
2014	Tom's Tribute	4	Mike E. Smith	James M. Cassidy	Tom & Marilyn Braly	1 mile	1:31.78	$79,750		
2013	Battle Force	4	Corey Nakatani	John Shirreffs	Woodford Racing	1 mile	1:32.94	$78,700		
2012	Race not held									
Thunder Road Handicap
2011	Fluke (BRZ)	6	Joseph Talamo	Humberto Ascanio	Patricia Bozano	1 mile	1:33.77	$100,000	III	
2010	Race not held									
2009	Matto Mondo (CHI)	5	Mike E. Smith	Richard E. Mandella	Yatse Stables I	1 mile	1:34.61	$100,000	III	
2008	Storm Military (ARG)	6	Garrett K. Gomez	Robert J. Frankel	Castleton Lyons & La Biznaga	1 mile	1:34.17	$81,150	Listed	
2007	Sweet Return (GB)	7	Alex O. Solis	Ron McAnally	Red Oak Stable	1 mile	1:35.47	$80,050	Listed	
2006	Senor Swinger	6	Victor Espinoza	Bob Baffert	Robert & Beverly Lewis	1 mile	1:34.00	$81,450	Listed	
2005	Laura's Lucky Boy	4	Pat Valenzuela	Vladimir Cerin	Ernie Moody	1 mile	1:34.39	$78,650	Listed	
2004	Singletary	4	Victor Espinoza	Don Chatlos	Little Red Feather Racing	1 mile	1:34.42	$71,350		

Legend:
All Weather Track Turf

== See also ==
- List of American and Canadian Graded races
