= Shared Belief =

American-bred Thoroughbred racehorse

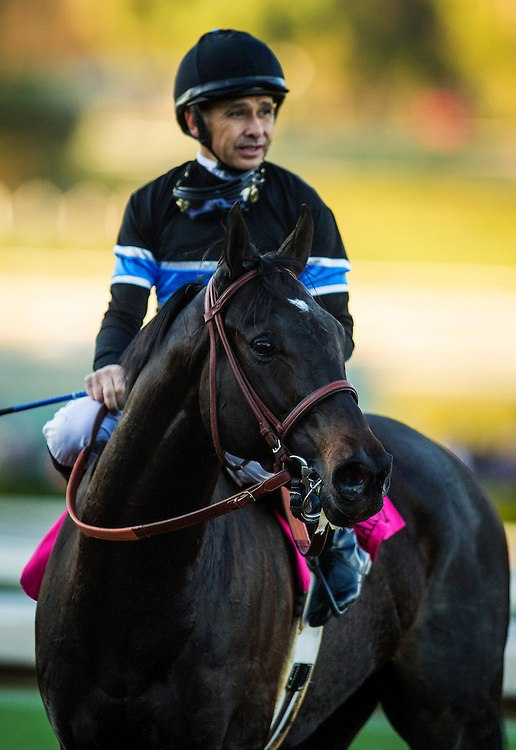
- Shared Belief with Mike E. Smith in 2014
- Sire: Candy Ride
- Grandsire: Ride the Rails
- Dam: Common Hope
- Damsire: Storm Cat
- Sex: Gelding
- Foaled: February 15, 2011
- Died: December 3, 2015
- Country: United States
- Colour: Dark bay
- Breeder: Pam & Martin Wygod
- Owner: Solis/Litt Bloodstock (Alex Solis II and Jason Litt), Jungle Racing (Jim Rome and Janet Rome), KMN Racing (Kevin Nish and Kim Nish), Jerry Hollendorfer, George Todaro
- Trainer: Jedd Josephson; Jerry Hollendorfer
- Record: 12: 10-0-0 (1 DNF)
- Earnings: $2,932,200

Major wins
- Hollywood Prevue Stakes (2013); CashCall Futurity (2013); Los Alamitos Derby (2014); Pacific Classic (2014); Awesome Again Stakes (2014); Malibu Stakes (2014); San Antonio Stakes (2015); Santa Anita Handicap (2015)

Awards
- American Champion Two-Year-Old Male Horse (2013)

Honours
- Shared Belief Stakes
- Last updated on March 28, 2015

Shared Belief (February 15, 2011 – December 3, 2015) was an American Thoroughbred racehorse. As a two-year-old, he was undefeated in three races, including the Hollywood Prevue Stakes and Los Alamitos Futurity, and was named the American Champion Two-Year-Old Colt of 2013 at the Eclipse Awards.

As a three-year-old, an injury kept Shared Belief out of the 2014 Kentucky Derby, but he returned later in the year to win four races including the Los Alamitos Derby, Pacific Classic, and Awesome Again Stakes. He broke his undefeated record in the Breeders' Cup Classic by finishing fourth, but then returned to win the Malibu Stakes.

In 2015 he defeated champion California Chrome in the San Antonio Stakes and then won the Santa Anita Handicap, before being sidelined for the rest season with a hip injury.

Returning to the track in late 2015, he had promising workouts and was being prepared for a return to racing in 2016. He died unexpectedly on December 3, 2015, due to complications of colic. Emergency surgery was performed at the University of California-Davis School of Veterinary medicine, but surgeons were unable to save him.

== Background ==
Shared Belief was a dark bay or brown gelding with a white star bred in Kentucky by Pam & Martin Wygod. He was sired by the undefeated Argentinian horse Candy Ride, whose other progeny include Gun Runner, Twirling Candy, Sidney's Candy, Mastery, Game Winner, Vekoma, and Misremembered. Shared Belief's dam, Common Hope, won one race and has also produced Iowa Oaks winner Little Miss Holly.

Shared Belief was trained by Jerry Hollendorfer and owned by a partnership which included Solis/Litt Bloodstock (Alex Solis II and Jason Litt), Jungle Racing (sports commentator Jim Rome and Janet Rome), KMN Racing (Kevin Nish and Kim Nish), trainer Hollendorfer, and Dr. George Todaro.

== Racing career ==
=== 2013: two-year-old season ===
Shared Belief made his racecourse debut in a maiden race over six furlongs on the synthetic Tapeta Footings track at Golden Gate Fields on October 19. Ridden by Juan Hernandez, he started at odds of 2.8/1 against eight opponents. The gelding was outsprinted in the early stages before moving up on the outside to take the lead in the straight. He drew away from the field to win by seven lengths in a time of 1:09.53. On November 10, Shared Belief was moved up in class to contest the Grade III Hollywood Prevue Stakes on the cushion track at Hollywood Park Racetrack.

Ridden by Corey Nakatani, he started 6/4 second favorite behind Kobe's Back in a five-runner field. He disputed the lead from the start before pulling clear in the straight to win by seven and three-quarter lengths. Over the same course on December 14, Shared Belief was moved up to Grade I class for the CashCall Futurity over a mile and a sixteenth and started favorite against eleven opponents.

Nakatani placed the gelding just behind the leaders before taking the lead in the straight and accelerating clear in the closing stages to win by five and three quarter lengths.

In January 2014, Shared Belief was named Champion Two-Year-Old Male Horse at the Eclipse Awards, beating Breeders' Cup Juvenile winner New Year's Day by 115 votes to 99. He became only the fourth 2-year-old male champion to have bypassed the Juvenile since that race was created in 1984.

=== 2014: three-year-old season ===
In January, Shared Belief developed an abscess on his right front foot. In March, it was announced that he would miss his engagement in the Blue Grass Stakes and would not be aimed at the Kentucky Derby. "We'll get him ready to run later on, if he stays good," said Hollendorfer. After recovering from his abscess, Shared Belief won an allowance race against older horses at Golden Gate Fields on May 26.

On July 7, the horse, ridden by Mike E. Smith for the first time, won the inaugural running of the Grade II Los Alamitos Derby, beating a Kentucky Derby participant, Candy Boy, by four and a quarter lengths. On August 24, Shared Belief contested the $1,000,000 TVG Pacific Classic Stakes at Del Mar Racetrack against older horses, going a mile and a quarter for the first time and attempting to emulate his sire Candy Ride, who won the race in 2003. He was ridden again by Smith, who chose Shared Belief as his mount over Game On Dude. The gelding raced in midfield before moving up on the outside, taking the lead a furlong and a half out, and drawing away to win by almost three lengths from the British challenger Toast of New York. Game On Dude finished fourth.

Shared Belief appeared to hamper the runner-up when hanging in towards the rail at the top of the stretch, but after a stewards' inquiry the result was allowed to stand. After the race, Smith stated, "He's a special horse. I heard someone say this might be the coming out of a superstar. I think now this horse deserves that accolade. I'll tell you what: he's as good a young horse as I've sat on in a while."

In his narrowest victory to date, Shared Belief took on older horses and won the September 27 Awesome Again Stakes by a neck over Kaleem Shah's Fed Biz, trained by Bob Baffert. He was forced wide for nearly the entire race, notably by a second Baffert entry, the longshot Sky Kingdom, a riding tactic viewed negatively as "gamesmanship" in post-race press analysis. Smith said, "They just kept taking me wide... if you want to press the pace or take me out a little bit, OK. But doing it at all costs just to get me beat isn't the way it should be done." As a result, the rider of Sky Kingdom, Victor Espinoza, received a suspension of seven racing days and was also denied the usual exemption for riding in designated stakes races. Sam Walker, writing in Britain's Racing Post described Shared Belief's win as "the best performance in the US this year".

On November 1 at Santa Anita Park, Shared Belief started the 5/2 favorite for the 2014 Breeders' Cup Classic. He was hampered at the start when Bayern veered to the left exiting the gate. After racing in fifth for most of the way, Shared Belief finished fourth of the fourteen runners behind Bayern, Toast of New York, and California Chrome. Smith commented, "I was never able to get comfortable after getting hit at the break. I kept getting bounced around all the way... Even so, he ran a dynamite race."

On his final appearance of the year, Shared Belief was brought back in distance for the Grade I Malibu Stakes over seven furlongs at Santa Anita on December 26. Carrying top weight of 123 pounds, he started the 1/2 favorite and won by a neck from Conquest Two Step after taking the lead inside the final furlong. After the race, Smith said, "This race proved what a great horse he is, just by doing what he did... that puts a big feather in his cap and puts him in front for Horse of the Year. I think this put him ahead of the rest."

On the Eclipse Award balloting, however, Shared Belief failed to make the shortlist for Horse of the Year and finished third to California Chrome and Bayern in the poll for American Champion Three-Year-Old Male Horse.

=== 2015: four-year-old season ===
Shared Belief began his third season in the San Antonio Stakes over nine furlongs at Santa Anita on February 7, which featured a much-anticipated clash with California Chrome. Smith positioned the gelding in third place before moving up to second on the outside when California Chrome took the lead on the turn. In the straight, Shared Belief moved up to join California Chrome, took the advantage a furlong out, and drew away in the final strides to win by a length and a half. There was a gap of six and half lengths back to Clark Handicap winner Hoppertunity in third place. Smith said, "He ranks right up there with the top five horses I have ever been on, with room to grow. It really was so impressive. There's no telling what this horse can do or the potential that he can reach."

Four weeks later, Shared Belief carried 125 pounds in the mile and a quarter Santa Anita Handicap and started as the favourite against twelve opponents headed by Whitney Handicap winner Moreno. Smith settled the gelding in sixth place before moving forward on the final turn. Shared Belief overtook the leader, Moreno, entering the straight and drew away in the closing stages to win by four and a quarter lengths. Commenting on the fact that the horse needed no urging to win the race, Mike Smith said, "[you] don't squeeze a lemon if you don't have to."

On April 18, Shared Belief raced outside California for the first time when he was sent to West Virginia to contest the Charles Town Classic. However, he slipped leaving the starting gate and Smith eased him at six furlongs because he wasn't moving properly and thus he failed to finish. After the race, swelling was detected in his right stifle. The track veterinarian declared it a soft tissue injury and said that it was neither life-threatening nor career-ending, but it was the second serious injury on the Charles Town track that day. The following Monday, test results revealed that Shared Belief had a non-displaced fracture at the point of his right hip and he was placed on stall rest.

Jim Rome tweeted that Shared Belief's "prognosis is excellent!" and thanked Smith for his quick action that saved the horse from greater injury. The horse was flown back to the west coast and as of 22 April 2015 was to be shipped to the Pegasus Training Center in Renton, Washington for 45 to 60 days of rehabilitation.

Returning to the track in late 2015, Shared Belief was being conditioned to return to racing and appeared to be the picture of health. But on the morning of December 3, 2015, Shared Belief began to show signs of colic. He was rushed to UC Davis for surgery, but could not be saved.

In 2016, the El Cajon Stakes at Del Mar Racetrack was renamed in his honor.

== Racing statistics ==
Date	Race	Racecourse	Grade	Distance	Finish	Margin	Time	Weight	Odds	Jockey	Ref
Oct 19, 2013	Maiden	Golden Gate Fields		6 Furlongs	1	7 lengths	1:09.53	120 lbs	2.80	Juan Hernandez	
Nov 10, 2013	Hollywood Prevue Stakes	Hollywood Park Racetrack	|||	7 Furlongs	1	7 3/4 lengths	1:22.17	118 lbs	1.50	Corey Nakatani	
Dec 14, 2013	CashCall Futurity	Hollywood Park Racetrack	|	1 1/16 miles	1	5 3/4 lengths	1:42.16	121 lbs	1.00*	Corey Nakatani	
May 26, 2014	Allowance	Golden Gate Fields		6 Furlongs	1	4 1/4 lengths	1:09.78	116 lbs	0.20*	Russell Baze	
Jul 5, 2014	Los Alamitos Derby	Los Alamitos Race Course	||	1 1/8 miles	1	4 1/4 lengths	1:47.01	122 lbs	0.70*	Mike E. Smith	
Aug 24, 2014	Pacific Classic Stakes	Del Mar Racetrack	|	1 1/4 miles	1	2 3/4 lengths	2:00.28	118 lbs	1.20*	Mike E. Smith	
Sep 27, 2014	Awesome Again Stakes	Santa Anita Park	|	1 1/8 miles	1	neck	1:48.58	121 lbs	0.20*	Mike E. Smith	
Nov 1, 2014	Breeders' Cup Classic	Santa Anita Park	|	1 1/4 miles	4	(3 3/4 lengths)	1:59.88	122 lbs	2.50*	Mike E. Smith	
Dec 26, 2014	Malibu Stakes	Santa Anita Park	|	7 Furlongs	1	neck	1:20.69	123 lbs	0.50*	Mike E. Smith	
Feb 7, 2015	San Antonio Stakes	Santa Anita Park	||	1 1/8 miles	1	1 1/2 lengths	1:48.45	123 lbs	1.00*	Mike E. Smith	
Mar 7, 2015	Santa Anita Handicap	Santa Anita Park	|	1 1/4 miles	1	4 1/4 lengths	2:00.67	125 lbs	0.30*	Mike E. Smith	
Apr 18, 2015	Charles Town Classic	Hollywood Casino at Charles Town Races	||	1 1/8 miles	N/A	N/A	1:48.81	123 lbs	0.30*	Mike E. Smith	

== Pedigree ==
Pedigree of Shared Belief, bay or brown gelding, 2011
Sire Candy Ride (ARG) 1996	Ride the Rails (USA); 1991	Cryptoclearance	Fappiano
Sire Candy Ride (ARG) 1996	Ride the Rails (USA); 1991	Cryptoclearance	Naval Orange
Sire Candy Ride (ARG) 1996	Ride the Rails (USA); 1991	Herbalesian	Herbager
Sire Candy Ride (ARG) 1996	Ride the Rails (USA); 1991	Herbalesian	Alanesian
Sire Candy Ride (ARG) 1996	Candy Girl (ARG); 1990	Candy Stripes	Blushing Groom
Sire Candy Ride (ARG) 1996	Candy Girl (ARG); 1990	Candy Stripes	Bubble Company
Sire Candy Ride (ARG) 1996	Candy Girl (ARG); 1990	City Girl (ARG)	Farnesio
Sire Candy Ride (ARG) 1996	Candy Girl (ARG); 1990	City Girl (ARG)	Cithara
Dam Common Hope (USA) 1997	Storm Cat (USA); 1983	Storm Bird (CAN)	Northern Dancer
Dam Common Hope (USA) 1997	Storm Cat (USA); 1983	Storm Bird (CAN)	South Ocean
Dam Common Hope (USA) 1997	Storm Cat (USA); 1983	Terlingua	Secretariat
Dam Common Hope (USA) 1997	Storm Cat (USA); 1983	Terlingua	Crimson Saint
Dam Common Hope (USA) 1997	Sown (USA); 1983	Grenfall	Graustark
Dam Common Hope (USA) 1997	Sown (USA); 1983	Grenfall	Primonetta
Dam Common Hope (USA) 1997	Sown (USA); 1983	Bad Seed	Stevward
Dam Common Hope (USA) 1997	Sown (USA); 1983	Bad Seed	Rich and Rare (Family: 19)
