= She Be Wild =

American-bred Thoroughbred racehorse

- Sire: Offlee Wild
- Grandsire: Wild Again
- Dam: Trapping
- Damsire: Seeking The Gold
- Sex: Filly
- Foaled: 2007
- Country: United States
- Colour: Bay
- Breeder: Nancy Mazzoni
- Owner: Nancy Mazzoni
- Trainer: Wayne M. Catalano
- Record: 7-4-1-0
- Earnings: $1,311,040

Major wins
- Top Flight Stakes (2009); Arlington-Washington Lassie Stakes (2009) Breeders' Cup wins: Breeders' Cup Juvenile Fillies (2009)

Awards
- American Champion Two-Year-Old Filly (2009)
- Last updated on January 19, 2010

She Be Wild (foaled March 7, 2007, in Kentucky), is an American Thoroughbred racehorse.

== Background ==
She Be Wild was sired by Offlee Wild, who was sired by Wild Again. She is out of the mare Trapping, who is by Seeking The Gold, a son of the influential Mr. Prospector.

== Racing career ==
She Be Wild made her racing debut at age two in 2009 with a 7¼-length maiden special weight, followed up by an allowance race victory. On August 8, she won the Top Flight Stakes by 5¼-lengths and on September 5, she won the Grade III Arlington-Washington Lassie Stakes. Unbeaten in three starts, she was then entered, and made the heavy betting favorite, for the $500,000 Grade I Alcibiades Stakes at Keeneland but finished second to Negligee.

On November 6, 2009, She Be Wild won the Breeders' Cup Juvenile Fillies. She was voted American Champion Two-Year-Old Filly for 2009.

She Be Wild raced twice without success in 2010 before being retired from racing. Upon her retirement, it was announced that she would be bred to top stallion Tapit. On February 1, 2012, she gave birth to her first foal, a chestnut filly named Shebealittlewild. She was bred back to Tapit, and foaled a gray filly named Propositioned on February 3, 2013. She then visited Smart Strike, producing a dark bay filly on February 12, 2014. She has not yet been named.

== Pedigree ==
Pedigree of She Be Wild
| Sire Offlee Wild | Wild Again | Icecapade | Nearctic |
| Sire Offlee Wild | Wild Again | Icecapade | Shenanigans |
| Sire Offlee Wild | Wild Again | Bushel-N-Peck | Khaled |
| Sire Offlee Wild | Wild Again | Bushel-N-Peck | Dama |
| Sire Offlee Wild | Alvear | Seattle Slew | Bold Reasoning |
| Sire Offlee Wild | Alvear | Seattle Slew | My Charmer |
| Sire Offlee Wild | Alvear | Andover Way | His Majesty |
| Sire Offlee Wild | Alvear | Andover Way | On The Trail |
| Dam Trappings | Seeking The Gold | Mr. Prospector | Raise a Native |
| Dam Trappings | Seeking The Gold | Mr. Prospector | Gold Digger |
| Dam Trappings | Seeking The Gold | Con Game | Buckpasser |
| Dam Trappings | Seeking The Gold | Con Game | Broadway |
| Dam Trappings | Duck Trap | Affirmed | Exclusive Native |
| Dam Trappings | Duck Trap | Affirmed | Won't Tell You |
| Dam Trappings | Duck Trap | Lilya's For Real | In Reality |
| Dam Trappings | Duck Trap | Lilya's For Real | Mousam River (Family 2-o) |
