= Vincent Timphony =

American horse trainer

Personal information
- Born: March 8, 1934 New Orleans, Louisiana
- Died: December 13, 2010 (aged 76) Arcadia, California
- Resting place: Metairie Cemetery, New Orleans
- Occupation: Racehorse trainer

Horse racing career
- Sport: Horse racing

Major racing wins
- Louisiana Derby (1984); Meadowlands Cup (1984); New Orleans Handicap (1984); Oaklawn Handicap (1984) Breeders' Cup wins: Breeders' Cup Classic (1984)

Significant horses
- Wild Again

Vincent A. Timphony (March 8, 1934 - December 13, 2010) was an American trainer of Thoroughbred racehorses best remembered for winning the 1984 inaugural running of the Breeders' Cup Classic, the first $3-million horse race.

A native of New Orleans, Vincent Timphony had a career year in 1984 with his horse, Wild Again. The 31–1 longshot capped it off at Hollywood Park Racetrack with a win over a strong field in the Breeders' Cup Classic. In what remains as one of the most memorable finishes in the race's history, Wild Again left behind the likes of future U. S. Racing Hall of Famer Precisionist and that year's Hollywood Gold Cup winner Desert Wine before battling down the stretch against another future Hall of Fame inductee Slew o' Gold and that year's Preakness Stakes winner, Gate Dancer.

An inveterate bettor, Vincent Timphony's faith in his horse saw him bet heavily on Wild Again to win the Classic. Years later the Los Angeles Times reported his wife had said her husband's gambling winnings that day were "more than $100,000."
