= Sweet Life Stakes =

- Class: Listed
- Location: Santa Anita Park; Arcadia, California, United States
- Inaugurated: 2010
- Race type: Thoroughbred – Flat racing
- Website: www.santaanita.com

Race information
- Distance: abt. 6 1/2 furlongs
- Surface: Turf
- Track: Downhill - Left-handed
- Qualification: Fillies, three years old
- Weight: 124 lbs with allowances
- Purse: US$100,000 (2019)

The Sweet Life Stakes is a listed American Thoroughbred horse race for three years old fillies over the distance of about six and one-half furlongs on the downhill turf course scheduled annually in February at Santa Anita Park in Arcadia, California. The event currently carries a purse of $100,000.

== History ==
The race was inaugurated in 2010 and was raced on the downhill turf course over the about 6 1/2 furlongs distance.

The event is named in honor of the 2009 Kentucky Broodmare of the Year Sweet Life. Sweet Life was the dam of 2004 American Champion Two-Year-Old Filly Sweet Catomine and 2009 GI Breeders' Cup Ladies' Classic winner Life Is Sweet. Also Sweet Life was victorious in the 1999 Providencia Stakes at Santa Anita Park.

In 2019 the event was upgraded to a Grade III event but was run on the dirt track due to inclement weather.

In 2020 the event was run at a distance of 5 1/2 furlongs on turf, using the backstretch start and in 2021 the distance was increased to six furlongs. In 2022 the event was scheduled on the original downhill turf course at the about six and one-half furlongs distance.

In 2023 the American Graded Stakes Committee downgraded the event to a Listed race.

== Records ==
Speed record:

- about 6 1/2 furlongs – 1:12.00 – Rose Catherine (2010)

Margins:

- 3 1/2 lengths – Rose Catherine (2010)

Most wins by a jockey

- 2 – Rafael Bejarano (2013, 2014)

Most wins by a trainer

- 3 – Peter L. Miller (2014, 2018, 2020)

Most wins by an owner:

- 2 - Gary Barber (2018, 2020)

== Winners ==
Year	Winner	Jockey	Trainer	Owner	Distance	Time	Purse	Grade	Ref
2025	Casalu	Flavien Prat	Bob Baffert	Karl Watson, Michael E. Pegram & Paul Weitman	abt. 6 1/2 furlongs	1:12.90	$102,000	Listed	
2024	Antifona (FR)	Hector Berrios	John W. Sadler	Hronis Racing	abt. 6 1/2 furlongs	1:12.91	$103,000	Listed	
2023	Manhattan Jungle (IRE)	Frankie Dettori	Michael McCarthy	Eclipse Thoroughbred Partners	abt. 6 1/2 furlongs	1:14.08	$102,500	Listed	
2022	Ouraika (FR)	Juan Hernandez	H. Graham Motion	Madaket Stables & Michael Dubb	abt. 6 1/2 furlongs	1:13.98	$102,500	III	
2021	Going Global (IRE)	Flavien Prat	Philip D'Amato	CYBT, Saul Gevertz, Michael Nentwig & Ray Pagano	6 furlongs	1:07.68	$103,500	III	
2020	Laura's Light	Abel Cedillo	Peter L. Miller	Gary Barber	5 1/2 furlongs	1:02.90	$101,000	III	
2019	Apache Princess	Kent J. Desormeaux	J. Keith Desormeaux	KMN Racing	6 1/2 furlongs	1:16.82	$100,000	III	On dirt
2018	War Heroine	Tyler Baze	Peter L. Miller	Gary Barber	abt. 6 1/2 furlongs	1:12.86	$83,415	Listed	
2017	Miss Sunset	Edwin A. Maldonado	Jeffrey L. Bonde	Alan P. Klein & Phillip Lebherz	abt. 6 1/2 furlongs	1:13.09	$91,935	Listed	
2016	Swift Lady	Martin Garcia	Bob Baffert	Baoma Corporation	abt. 6 1/2 furlongs	1:13.04	$79,080		
2015	She's a Big Winner	Brice Blanc	Peter Eurton	Sharon Alesia, Ciaglia Racing, Rob Dyrdek & Robin Christianson	abt. 6 1/2 furlongs	1:12.42	$79,800		
2014	On the Backstreets	Rafael Bejarano	Peter L. Miller	Brewer Racing, Lanzman Racing, Rockingham Ranch, J. Wood	abt. 6 1/2 furlongs	1:12.44	$81,650		
2013	Judy In Disguise (GB)	Rafael Bejarano	Simon Callaghan	Eclipse Thoroughbred Partner	abt. 6 1/2 furlongs	1:12.25	$81,850		
2012	Indigo River (IRE)	Joel Rosario	Jeff Mullins	Michael House	abt. 6 1/2 furlongs	1:13.36	$73,950		
2011	Bloemer Girl	Victor Espinoza	Jedd B. Josephson	Andrew & Christa Arthur	abt. 6 1/2 furlongs	1:13.75	$94,150	Listed	
2010	Rose Catherine	Garrett K. Gomez	Todd A. Pletcher	Paul P. Pompa Jr.	abt. 6 1/2 furlongs	1:12.00	$66,150		

Legend:
Dirt Turf

== See also ==
- List of American and Canadian Graded races
