= Monmouth Cup Stakes =

Grade III stakes race for thoroughbred horses

- Class: Grade III
- Location: Monmouth Park Racetrack; Oceanport, New Jersey, United States
- Inaugurated: 1977 (49 years ago) at Meadowlands Racetrack (as the Meadowlands Cup)
- Race type: Thoroughbred
- Website: www.monmouthpark.com/stakes-schedule/

Race information
- Distance: 1 1/8 miles (9.0 furlongs)
- Surface: Dirt
- Track: Left-handed
- Qualification: 3-year-olds
- Weight: Base weights with allowances: 4-year-olds and up: 124 lbs. 3-year-olds: 121 lbs.
- Purse: $400,000 (2022)

The Monmouth Cup Stakes is a Grade III American Thoroughbred horse race for three-years-old and older run over a distance of 1 1/8 miles annually in early July at Monmouth Park in Oceanport, New Jersey. The event currently offers a purse of $400,000 added.

== History ==
The event was inaugurated as the Meadowlands Cup and held at the Meadowlands Racetrack on 29 October 1977 and was won by Pay Tribute who was trained by the Hall of Fame trainer Ron McAnally and ridden by Hall of Fame jockey Ángel Cordero Jr. by 3/4 lengths in a time of 2:02 3/5 over the 1 1/4 miles distance.

The event was the signature event at the Meadowlands track with its high stakes attracting class horses. Within two years when champion three-year-old Spectacular Bid won the event in stakes record time it was classed as Grade II. The event was upgraded to Grade I in 1983.

The event was decreased to its present 1 1/8 miles distance in 1990. That year's running posed one of the largest upsets in North American racing history when Great Normand won at 181-1 odds.

There was no race held in 1997 or 2011. The race was downgraded from a Grade II to a Grade III in 2017, and the purse was reduced to $100,000 from the previous $200,000.

The event was moved to Monmouth Park in 2010 and was renamed to the Monmouth Cup Stakes.

Sharp Azteca's win in 2017 set a track record at Monmouth for the distance of 1 1/16 miles, beating Formal Gold's 1:40.20 that was set in August 1997.

== Records ==
Speed record:

- 1 1/8 miles: 1:45.93 – Etched (2009)
- 1 1/16 miles: 1:40.19 – Sharp Azteca (2017)
- 1 1/4 miles: 1:58.80 – Alysheba (1988)

Margins

- 10 1/2 lengths - Knightsbridge (2026)

Most wins:

- 2 – Etched (2009, 2010)
- 2 – Bradester (2015, 2016)

Most wins by a jockey:

- 4 – Ángel Cordero Jr. (1977, 1978, 1983, 1986)
- 4 – John R. Velazquez (1998, 2001, 2004, 2006)

Most wins by a trainer:

- 5 – Todd A. Pletcher (2004, 2006, 2012, 2021, 2024)

Most wins by an owner:

- 2 – Darley Stable (2009, 2010)
- 2 – Joseph W. Sutton (2015, 2016)
- 2 - Winstar Farm (2012, 2020)
- 2 - Godolphin (2023, 2026)

== Winners ==
Year	Winner	Age	Jockey	Trainer	Owner	Distance	Time	Purse	Grade	Ref
At Monmouth Park – Monmouth Cup Stakes
2026	Knightsbridge	5	Flavien Prat	William I. Mott	Godolphin	1 1/8 miles	1:47.51	$350,000	III	
2025	Surface to Air	5	Samuel Marin	Panagiotis Synnefias	Premier Stable	1 1/8 miles	1:49.29	$396,000	III	
2024	Tapit Trice	4	Irad Ortiz Jr.	Todd A. Pletcher	Whisper Hill Farm & Gainesway Stable	1 1/8 miles	1:50.46	$404,000	III	
2023	Proxy	5	Joel Rosario	Michael Stidham	Godolphin Racing	1 1/8 miles	1:49.99	$400,000	III	
2022	Highly Motivated	4	Flavien Prat	Chad C. Brown	Klaravich Stables	1 1/8 miles	1:46.53	$400,000	III	
2021	Dr Post	4	Joel Rosario	Todd A. Pletcher	St. Elias Stable	1 1/8 miles	1:47.53	$300,000	III	
2020	Global Campaign	4	Jorge Vargas Jr.	Stanley M. Hough	Winstar Farm & Sagamore Farm	1 1/8 miles	1:50.47	$315,000	III	
2019	War Story	4	Luis Saez	Jorge Navarro	Imaginary Stables & Glenn Ellis	1 1/8 miles	1:47.65	$199,000	III	
2018	Name Changer	4	José L. Ortiz	Alan E. Goldberg	Colts Neck Stables	1 1/8 miles	1:49.56	$150,000	III	
2017	Sharp Azteca	4	Paco Lopez	Jorge Navarro	Gelfenstein Farm	1 1/16 miles	1:40.19	$95,000	III	
2016	Bradester	6	Joe Bravo	Eddie Kenneally	Joseph W. Sutton	1 1/16 miles	1:42.21	$199,000	II	
2015	Bradester	5	Corey J. Lanerie	Eddie Kenneally	Joseph W. Sutton	1 1/16 miles	1:42.43	$199,000	II	
2014	Valid	4	Orlando Bocachica	Marcus J. Vitali	Crossed Sabres Farm	1 1/16 miles	1:41.43	$211,000	II	
2013	Pants on Fire	5	Paco Lopez	Kelly J. Breen	Lori & George Hall	1 1/16 miles	1:45.86	$195,000	II	
2012	Rule	5	Joe Bravo	Todd A. Pletcher	WinStar Farm	1 mile	1:37.71	$200,000	II	
2011	Race not held									
2010	Etched	5	Eddie Castro	Kiaran P. McLaughlin	Darley Stable	1 1/8 miles	1:50.31	$297,500	II	
At The Meadowlands – Meadowlands Cup
2009	Etched	4	Alan Garcia	Kiaran P. McLaughlin	Darley Stable	1 1/8 miles	1:45.93	$300,000	II	
2008	Arson Squad	5	Edgar S. Prado	Richard E. Dutrow Jr.	Jay Em Ess Stable	1 1/8 miles	1:48.81	$350,000	II	
2007	Diamond Stripes	4	Cornelio Velásquez	Richard E. Dutrow Jr.	Four Roses Thoroughbreds	1 1/8 miles	1:48.36	$499,000	II	
2006	Master Command	4	John R. Velazquez	Todd A. Pletcher	Aaron & Marie Jones	1 1/8 miles	1:46.21	$499,000	II	
2005	Tap Day	4	Eibar Coa	Mark A. Hennig	Edward P. Evans	1 1/8 miles	1:48.80	$500,000	II	
2004	Balto Star	6	John R. Velazquez	Todd A. Pletcher	Anstu Stables, Inc.	1 1/8 miles	1:48.60	$500,000	II	
2003	Bowman's Band	5	Ramon A. Dominguez	H. Allen Jerkens	Martin S. Schwartz	1 1/8 miles	1:46.80	$400,000	II	
2002	Burning Roma	4	Eibar Coa	Heather A. Giglio	Harold Queen	1 1/8 miles	1:48.80	$400,000	II	
2001	Gander	5	John R. Velazquez	John P. Terranova II	Gatsas Thoroughbreds	1 1/8 miles	1:47.00	$500,000	II	
2000	North East Bound	4	José A. Vélez Jr.	William W. Perry	Julian Demarco & Richard J. Disano	1 1/8 miles	1:48.80	$400,000	II	
1999	Pleasant Breeze	4	Jorge F. Chavez	H. James Bond	William L. Clifton Jr.	1 1/8 miles	1:47.00	$500,000	II	
1998	K. J.'s Appeal	4	John R. Velazquez	Frank A. Alexander	Releib Stable	1 1/8 miles	1:46.00	$500,000	I	
1997	Race not held									
1996	Dramatic Gold	5	Kent J. Desormeaux	David E. Hofmans	Golden Eagle Farm	1 1/8 miles	1:48.00	$750,000	I	
1995	Peaks and Valleys	3	Julie Krone	James E. Day	Pin Oak Stable	1 1/8 miles	1:48.00	$500,000	I	
1994	Conveyor	6	Mike E. Smith	Ben W. Perkins Sr.	New Farm	1 1/8 miles	1:47.80	$500,000	I	
1993	Marquetry	6	Kent J. Desormeaux	Robert J. Frankel	Morley Engelson & Robert J. Frankel	1 1/8 miles	1:47.20	$500,000	I	
1992	§ Sea Cadet	4	Alex O. Solis	Ron McAnally	VHW Farms	1 1/8 miles	1:48.00	$500,000	I	
1991	Twilight Agenda	5	Chris McCarron	D. Wayne Lukas	Moyglare Stud	1 1/8 miles	1:46.60	$500,000	I	
1990	Great Normand	5	Carlos E. Lopez Sr.	Jorge E. Romero	Victor Resk	1 1/8 miles	1:47.20	$500,000	I	
1989	Mi Selecto	4	José A. Santos	Gil H. Rowntree	Frank Stronach	1 1/4 miles	2:00.20	$500,000	I	
1988	Alysheba	4	Chris McCarron	Jack Van Berg	Dorothy & Pamela Scharbauer	1 1/4 miles	1:58.80	$600,000	I	
1987	Creme Fraiche	5	Laffit Pincay Jr.	Woodford C. Stephens	Brushwood Stable	1 1/4 miles	2:01.80	$500,000	I	
1986	Broad Brush	3	Ángel Cordero Jr.	Richard W. Small	Robert E. Meyerhoff	1 1/4 miles	2:01.60	$500,000	I	
1985	Bounding Basque	5	Robbie Davis	Woodrow M. Sedlacek	Jacques D. Wimpfheimer	1 1/4 miles	2:00.40	$500,000	I	
1984	Wild Again	4	Richard Migliore	Vincent Timphony	Black Chip Stables	1 1/4 miles	2:00.60	$500,000	I	
1983	Slewpy	3	Ángel Cordero Jr.	Sidney J. Watters Jr.	Equusequity Stable	1 1/4 miles	2:02.40	$400,000	I	
1982	Mehmet	4	Eddie Delahoussaye	Robert J. Frankel	Dr. & Mrs. A. J. Chlad, Sam Mevorach & Elizabeth Vallone	1 1/4 miles	2:01.40	$400,000	II	
1981	Princelet	3	William Nemeti	John P. Campo	John P. Campo	1 1/4 miles	2:02.80	$336,600	II	
1980	Tunerup	4	Jacinto Vásquez	Floreano Fernandez	Daybreak Farm	1 1/4 miles	2:00.40	$327,500	II	
1979	Spectacular Bid	3	Bill Shoemaker	Bud Delp	Hawksworth Farm	1 1/4 miles	2:01.20	$361,000	II	
1978	Dr. Patches	4	Ángel Cordero Jr.	John A. Nerud	Tartan Stable	1 1/4 miles	2:01.60	$161,350	Listed	
1977	Pay Tribute	5	Ángel Cordero Jr.	Ron McAnally	Elmendorf Farm	1 1/4 miles	2:02.60	$176,800		

Notes:
§ Ran as an entry

== See also ==
- List of American and Canadian Graded races
