= Astra Stakes =

- Class: Listed
- Location: Santa Anita Park; Arcadia, California, United States
- Inaugurated: 2015
- Race type: Thoroughbred - Flat racing - Turf
- Website: www.santaanita.com

Race information
- Distance: 1 1/2 miles
- Surface: Turf
- Track: Left-handed
- Qualification: Fillies and Mares, four years old and older
- Weight: 124 lbs with allowances
- Purse: $100,000 (since 2023)

The Astra Stakes is a Listed American Thoroughbred horse race for fillies and mares that are four years old or older, over a distance of 1 1/2 miles on the turf held annually in January at Santa Anita Park, Arcadia, California. The event currently carries a purse of $100,000.

== History ==
The race was inaugurated in 2015 and the event was run over the 1 1/2 miles distance.

The event is named in honor of the mare Astra who won four Grade I events including the Santa Barbara Handicap twice, which is run at Santa Anita Park.

In 2019 the event was upgraded to a Grade III event.

In 2020 the event started on the Downhill turf course.

In 2023 the American Graded Stakes Committee downgraded the event to Listed.

== Records ==
Speed record:

- 1 1/2 miles – 2:26.61 - Kitten's Point (2015)

Margins:

- 5 1/4 lengths – Pantsonfire (IRE) (2019)

Most wins by a jockey

- 2 – Brice Blanc (2016, 2020)
- 2 – Flavien Prat (2015, 2019)
- 2 – Umberto Rispoli (2021, 2026)

Most wins by a trainer

- 2 – Richard Baltas (2017, 2019)

Most wins by an owner

- 2 – Augustin Stables (2015, 2026)

== Winners ==
Year	Winner	Age	Jockey	Trainer	Owner	Distance	Time	Purse	Grade	Ref
2026	Mrs. Astor	5	Umberto Rispoli	Jonathan Thomas	Augustin Stables	1 1/2 miles	2:27.46	$100,000	Listed	
2025	Race not held									
2024	Linda's Gift	5	Tiago Pereira	Richard E. Mandella	John Cronin, Anthony DiMarco, Michael A. Mandara, Fred Nicotra & Vincent Varvaro	1 1/2 miles	2:28.49	$101,000	Listed	
2023	Duvet Day (IRE)	4	Kazushi Kimura	Michael McCarthy	Burt & Jane Bacharach & Richard Schatz	1 1/2 miles	2:28.12	$102,000	Listed	
2022	Neige Blanche (FR)	5	Juan Hernandez	Leonard Powell	Madaket Stables, Laura De Seroux, Marsha Naify & Mathilde Powell	1 1/2 miles	2:32.27	$125,000	III	
2021	Quick (GB)	5	Umberto Rispoli	John W. Sadler	Hronis Racing	1 1/2 miles	2:27.71	$102,000	III	
2020	Ms Peintour	5	Brice Blanc	Brian J. Koriner	Jay Em Ess Stable	1 1/2 miles	2:26.71	$101,000	III	
2019	Pantsonfire (IRE)	5	Flavien Prat	Richard Baltas	Next Wave Racing, Pat Maciariello, Jeremy Peskoff & Mark Silverstein	1 1/2 miles	2:27:83	$101,404	III	
2018	Plein Air (IRE)	5	Tyler Baze	Bob Baffert	Sunny Brook Stable	1 1/2 miles	2:27.34	$82,425	Listed	
2017 (Note: The event in 2017 was run as the Astra II Stakes)	Goodyearforroses (IRE)	5	Corey Nakatani	Richard Baltas	Abbondanza Racing	1 1/2 miles	2:28.07	$79,725	Listed	
2016	Havanna Belle (IRE)	4	Brice Blanc	Philip D'Amato	Michael House	1 1/2 miles	2:27.03	$80,200		
2015	Kitten's Point	5	Flavien Prat	H. Graham Motion	Augustin Stable	1 1/2 miles	2:26.61	$80,500		
