= Santa Anita Park =

Horse racing track in Arcadia, California, US

- Santa Anita Park logo

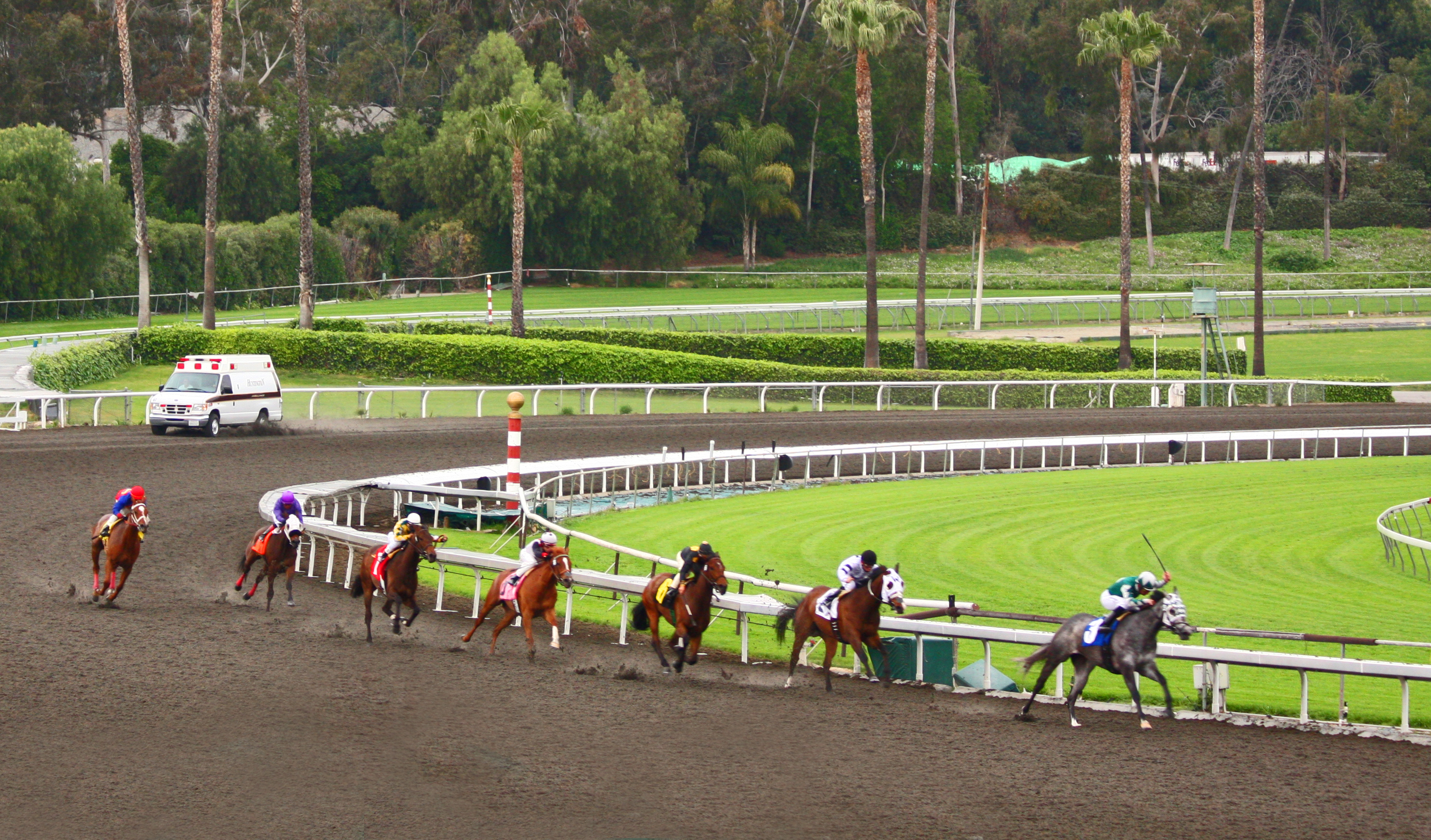
- Interactive map of Santa Anita Park
- Location: 285 W. Huntington, Arcadia, California, U.S.
- Coordinates: 34°08′26″N 118°02′40″W
- Owned by: Stronach Group
- Date opened: December 25, 1934
- Course type: Thoroughbred flat racing
- Notable races: Santa Anita Handicap (G1); Santa Anita Derby (G1); Sunshine Millions Day

Santa Anita Park is a Thoroughbred racetrack in Arcadia, California, United States. It offers some of the prominent horse racing events in the United States during early fall, winter and in spring. The track is home to numerous prestigious races, including both the Santa Anita Derby and the Santa Anita Handicap. It has also hosted the year-end Breeders' Cup races eleven times, more than any other racetrack. In 1984, Santa Anita was the site of equestrian events at the 1984 Olympics and will host once again in 2028. Since 2011, the Stronach Group are the current owners.

== History ==
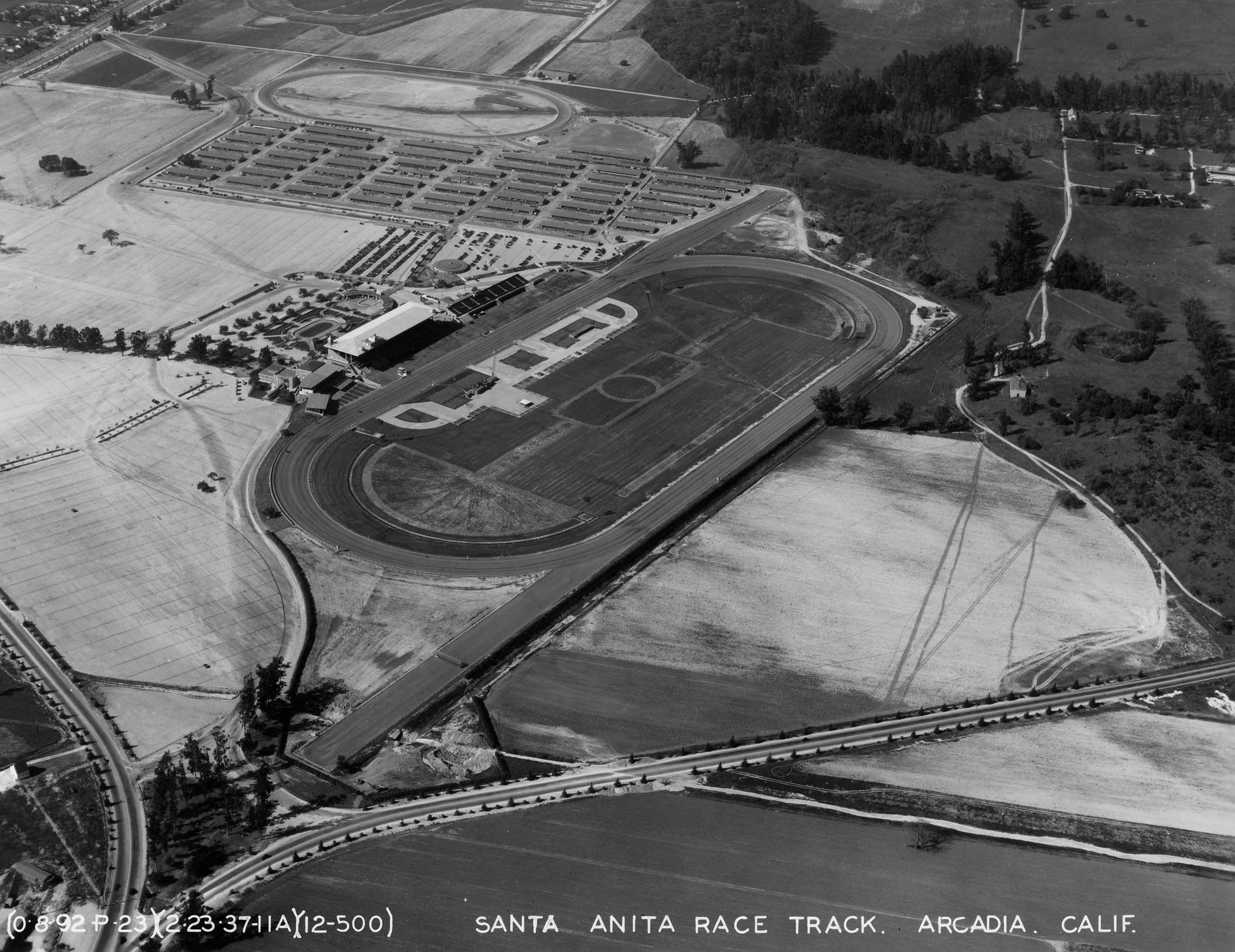
Santa Anita Race Track in 1937

"Rancho Santa Anita" was owned originally by former San Gabriel Mission Mayor-Domo, Claudio Lopez, and named after a family member, "Anita Cota". The ranch was later acquired by rancher Hugo Reid, a Scotsman. The property's most widely known owner was probably multimillionaire Lucky Baldwin, a successful businessman in San Francisco who greatly enhanced his wealth through an investment in the famous Comstock Lode. Baldwin became a successful breeder and owner of Thoroughbred racehorses and in 1904 built a racetrack adjacent to the present site. On February 4, 1909 the California State Legislature passed an anti-racetrack gambling bill known as the Walker–Otis Law. Similar in its goal to New York State's 1908 Hart–Agnew Law, the California law resulted in the permanent closing of the Baldwin racetrack. In 1912 the racing facility burned to the ground.

In 1933, California legalized parimutuel wagering and several investor groups worked to open racetracks. In the San Francisco area, a group headed by Dr. Charles H "Doc" Strub was having trouble locating a site. In the Los Angeles area, a group headed by movie producer Hal Roach was in need of further funds. These two groups combined and the newly formed Los Angeles Turf Club opened the present day track on Christmas Day in 1934, making it the first formally-established racetrack in California. Architect Gordon Kaufmann designed its various buildings in a combination of Colonial Revival and a type of Art Deco known as Streamline Moderne, painted primarily in Santa Anita's signature colors of Persian Green and Chiffon Yellow.

In February 1935, the first Santa Anita Handicap was run. The race's $100,000 purse, largest of any race ever in the United States until that time, produced its nickname the Big 'Cap.

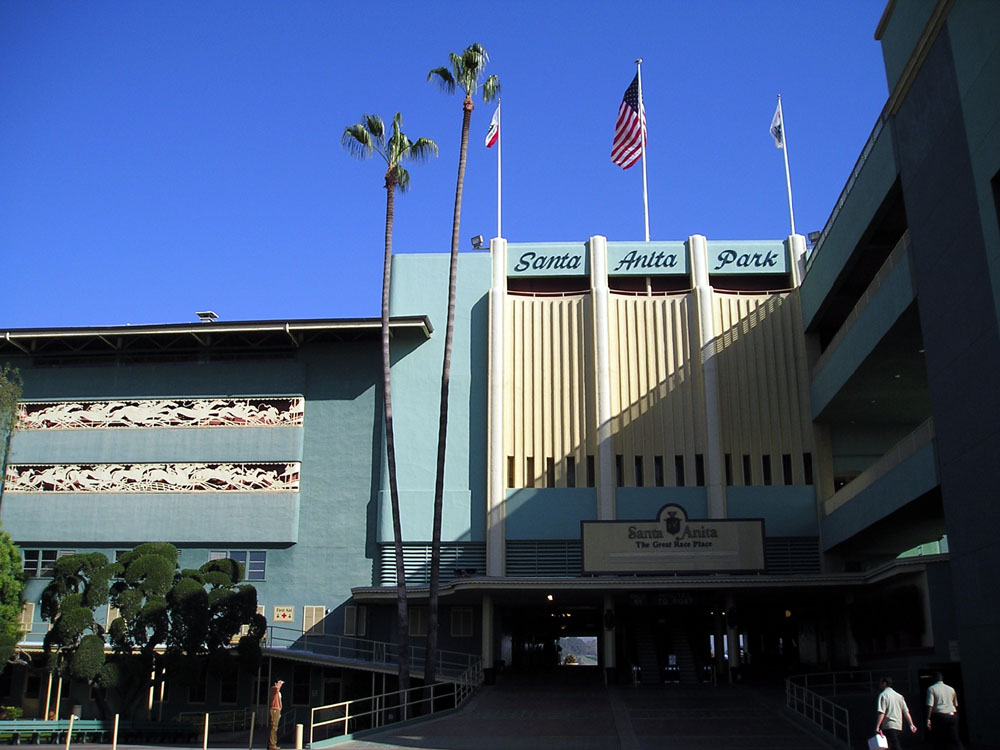
Art deco entrance to Santa Anita's grandstands.

In its heyday, the track's races attracted such stars as Betty Grable, Lana Turner, Edgar Bergen, Jane Russell, Cary Grant, Clark Gable, and Esther Williams, among others. Bing Crosby, Joe E. Brown, Al Jolson, and Harry Warner were all stockholders.

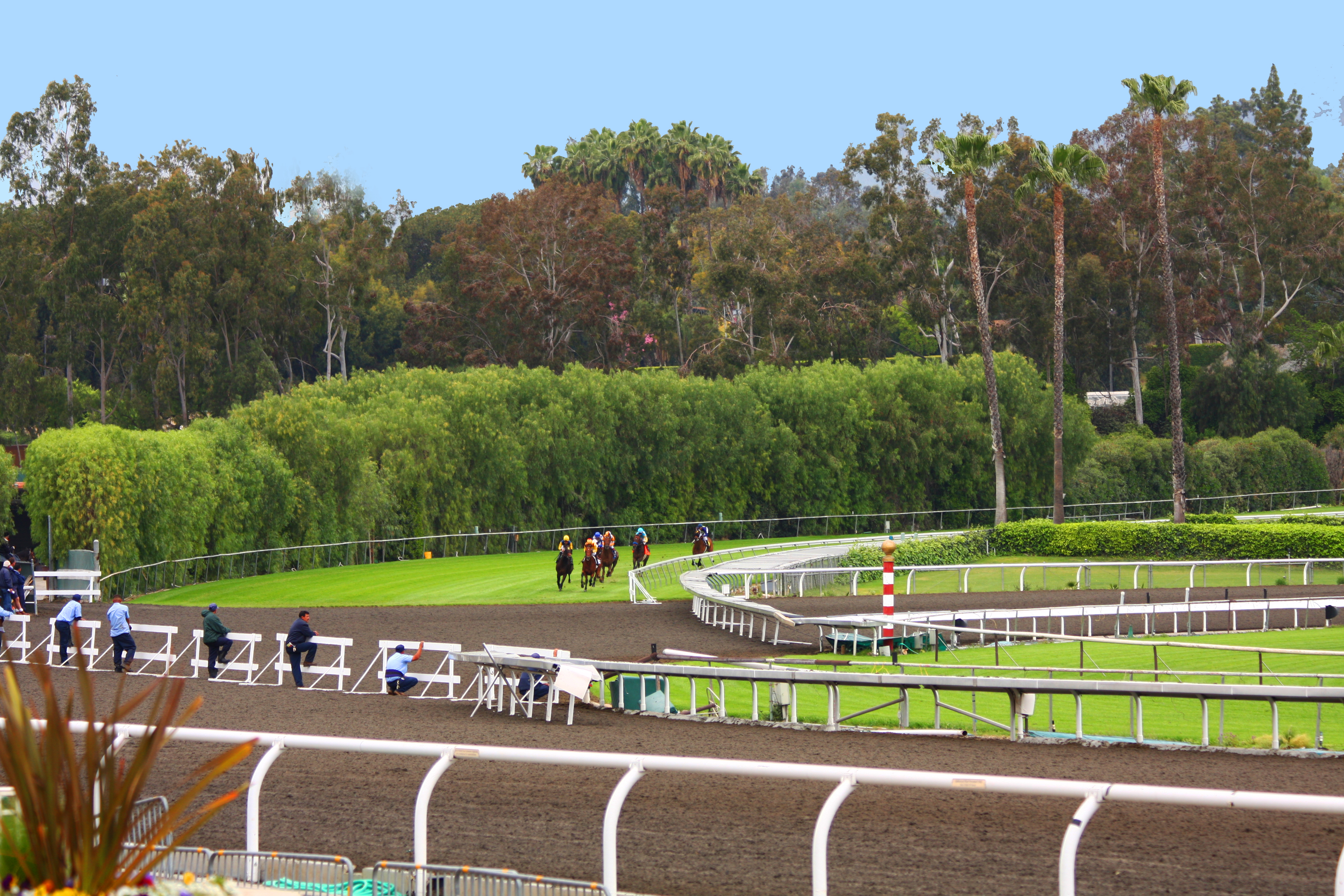
The unique downhill turf course includes a section where horses have to momentarily cross the dirt track

In 1940, Seabiscuit won the Santa Anita Handicap in his last start.

In 1942, racing at Santa Anita was suspended due to the Second World War. Santa Anita was used as an assembly center for Japanese Americans excluded from the West Coast. For several months in 1942, over 18,000 people lived in horse stables and military-style barracks constructed on the site, including actor George Takei, then a young boy. After the track reopened in 1945, it went through the postwar years with prosperity. A downhill turf course, which added a distinctly European flair to racing at Santa Anita, was added in 1953.

Due to its proximity to Los Angeles, Santa Anita has traditionally been associated with the film and television industries. The racetrack sequences in the Marx Brothers 1937 classic A Day at the Races were filmed there, and The Story of Seabiscuit with Shirley Temple was filmed on location in 1949. It was also featured in A Star Is Born (1937). Several stars, including Bing Crosby, Spencer Tracy, Errol Flynn, Alex Trebek, and MGM mogul, Louis B. Mayer, have owned horses that raced at the park.

The 1958 Santa Anita Derby was attended by 61,123 people, making the attendance that day a record crowd. They had come to watch Silky Sullivan come from 28 lengths off the pace and win—going away.

The 1960s brought about a major renovation of Santa Anita Park, including a much-expanded grandstand as well as major seating additions. In 1968, Del Mar Racetrack relinquished its dates for a fall meeting. A group of horsemen including Clement Hirsch intervened and established the not-for-profit Oak Tree Racing Association. Oak Tree had no facilities of its own and rented Santa Anita Park for its first autumn meeting in 1969. The Oak Tree Association became the operator of the autumn meet at Santa Anita Park. This meet usually ran from the end of September until early November. Many key stakes races were held during the Oak Tree Meeting, including many preps to the Breeders' Cup races. The Oak Tree meet relocated to Hollywood Park for 2010 but the California Horse Racing Board awarded the fall dates to Santa Anita in its own right in 2011. This prompted a renaming of many stakes races held at the fall meeting that were formerly associated with Oak Tree. For example, the Norfolk, Goodwood, Yellow Ribbon, Lady's Secret, and Oak Leaf, were renamed at the FrontRunner, Awesome Again, Rodeo Drive, Zenyatta and Chandelier respectively.

Prosperity continued at Santa Anita throughout the 1970s and the 1980s. In 1984, Santa Anita hosted the equestrian events at the 1984 Olympics, and in 1985, the track set an attendance record of 85,527 people on Santa Anita Handicap Day. Recognizing the potential revenue boon to the State of California, the California Legislature expanded off track betting, bring operating betting parlors within closer driving distance of the race-day tracks. While the Santa Anita meeting could still draw large crowds, attendance had decreased by a third. Only 56,810 people were at the park for Santa Anita Derby Day 2007 to witness a Grade I event.

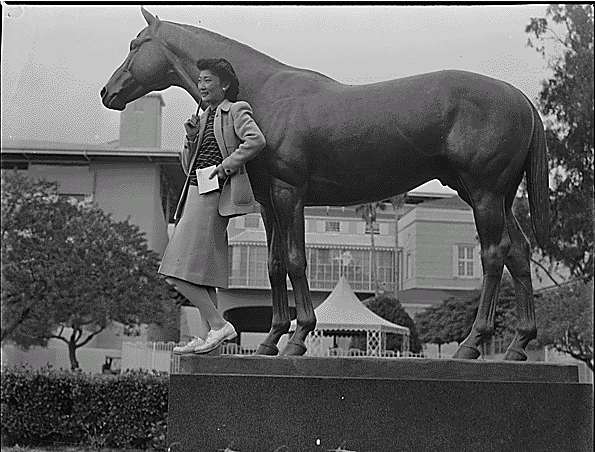
The Seabiscuit statue, created by American sculptor Jame Hughlette ("Tex") Wheeler was hand tooled by Frank Buchler, a German immigrant the owner of Washington Ornamental Iron Company Los Angeles. Washington Ornamental Iron Company built all of Santa Anita's facilities. Lily Okuru, a Japanese American woman who lived on the site during its time as a War Relocation Camp, poses with Seabiscuit statue, 1942.

In 1997, Santa Anita Park was acquired by Meditrust when it purchased the Santa Anita Companies for its unique real estate investment trust paired share corporate structure. Following the elimination of the special tax treatment accorded Pair Share REITs, Meditrust sold the track to Magna Entertainment Corp. In 2006, Gulfstream Park and Santa Anita cohosted the Sunshine Millions, a day of competition with $3.6 million in stakes races between horses bred in the State of Florida and those bred in the State of California.

At Santa Anita, harness racing was also conducted.

At Santa Anita Park's European-style paddock there are statues of jockeys George Woolf, Johnny Longden, Bill Shoemaker and Laffit Pincay Jr. plus a memorial bust of announcer Joe Hernandez and one of trainer Charlie Whittingham with his dog, Toby. There is also a lifesize bronze of Seabiscuit in the walking ring at Seabiscuit Court; a similar bronze of John Henry was unveiled near the Seabiscuit statue in December 2009. Buried near the paddock is Emperor of Norfolk, the best horse Lucky Baldwin ever owned, along with three other great Baldwin horses: Volante, Silver Cloud, and Rey El Santa Anita, all four of them winners of the prestigious American Derby. In 2012, a lifesize bronze of Zenyatta was unveiled prior to the running of the race renamed in her honor.

Since 1950, Santa Anita Park has annually presented the George Woolf Memorial Jockey Award to a rider who demonstrates high standards of personal and professional conduct, on and off the racetrack.

South African native Trevor Denman served as Santa Anita's full-time announcer from the 1983 Oak Tree meet until his retirement from the position in 2015. Denman is noted for his calls beginning with "And awaaay they go..." and his distinctive gravelly voice. Queensland, Australia native Michael Wrona was chosen to succeed Denman in March 2016. At the end of 2018, The Stronach Group named Frank Mirahmadi as Santa Anita's announcer.

Starting in 2014, Santa Anita began adding more racing cards due to the closure of Hollywood Park Racetrack, hosting Hollywood Park's old spring dates from late April until June.

In mid-March 2020, due to the COVID-19 outbreak, racing resumed without fans; two weeks later, racing was suspended until May 15, 2020.

During the January 2025 Southern California wildfires Santa Anita's parking lots were used to distribute relief supplies to affected residents, as well as for emergency staging for agencies including Southern California Edison. Three days of live racing were cancelled due to fire and air quality concerns, as the track lay near to the Eaton Fire.

In April 2025 the International Federation for Equestrian Sports (FEI) announced that Santa Anita Park had been selected to host the equestrian events for the 2028 Summer Olympics and Paralympics.

=== Horse fatalities of 2019 ===
In early March 2019, all races were cancelled following the 21st fatality of the winter season; racing resumed late in the month. Races were postponed so that the dirt surface could be studied. Seven of the 21 deaths occurred during races on the dirt oval with nine happening during training on dirt and the others occurring on the turf track.

Thirty-seven horses died at the facility in 2019, causing the above noted suspension of races, and resulting in the California Racing Commission considering rule changes. Following the death of the 30th horse in late June, trainer Jerry Hollendorfer, who had trained four of the horses that died, was banned forever by the Stronach Group from all of its facilities.

=== Santa Anita Assembly Center ===
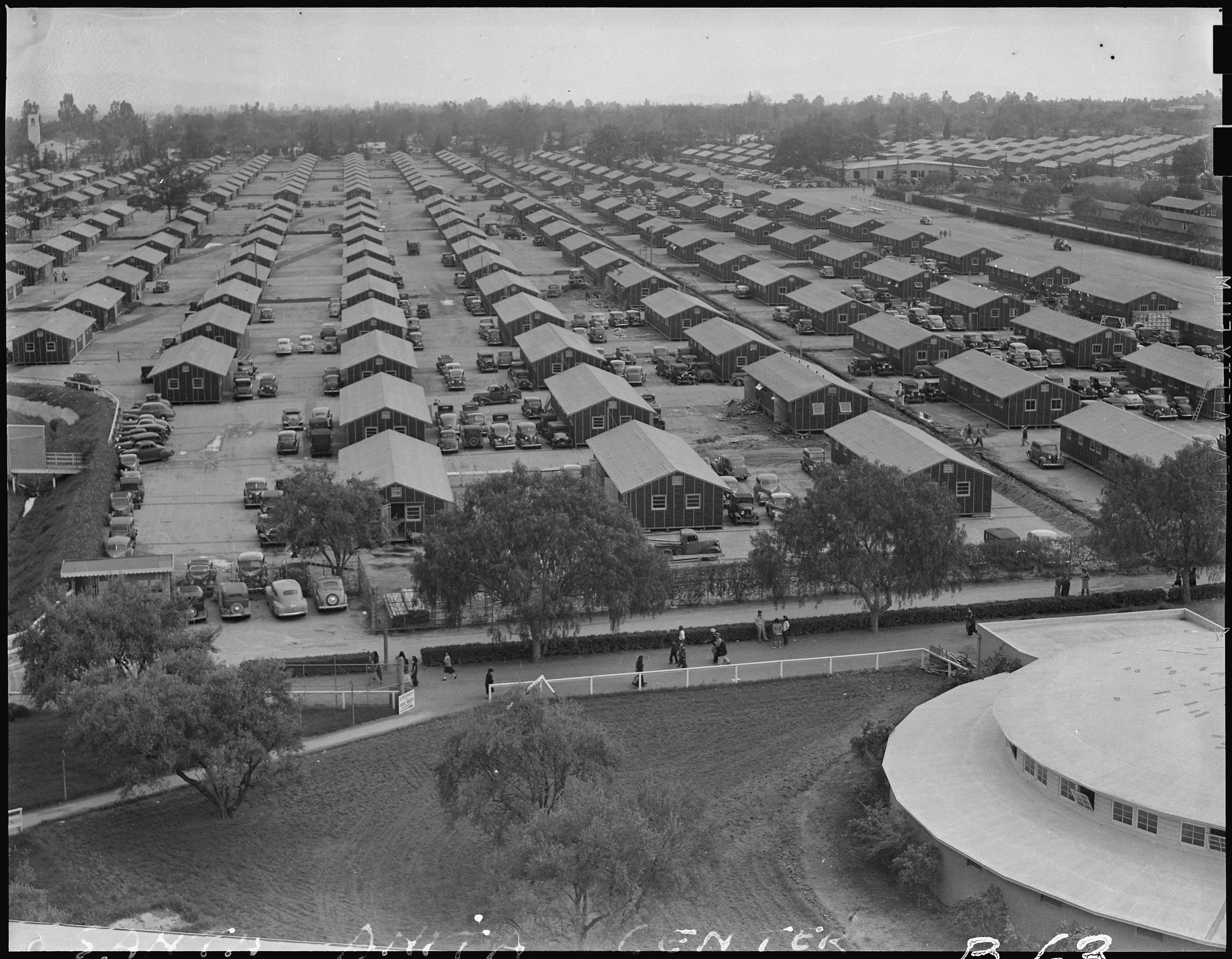
A panoramic view of the Santa Anita Assembly Center

In February 1942, after President Franklin D. Roosevelt issued Executive Order 9066, which authorized military commanders to exclude "any or all persons" from certain areas in the name of national defense, the Western Defense Command began ordering Japanese Americans living on the West Coast to present themselves for "evacuation" from the newly created military zones. Seventeen temporary "assembly centers" were designated to house the evicted population until construction on the more permanent and isolated internment camps was finished. Most, like the Santa Anita Assembly Center, were converted from former uses like racing tracks or fairgrounds.

Santa Anita was turned over to the Wartime Civilian Control Administration, the government body responsible for oversight of the temporary detention facilities, in March 1942, and army engineers soon after built 500 barracks on the parking lot and converted the horse stables and the area underneath the grandstand into residential "apartments". Japanese-Americans began arriving in April, most coming from the surrounding Los Angeles County, and the center's population soon topped 18,000, peaking at 18,719 by August of that year. Six mess halls, each seating approximately 850 at a time, fed some 3,000 people daily at a cost of 33 cents per person. The sanitary facilities faced similar overcrowding, with a ratio of 30 people to each shower after the number of showers was increased from 150 to 225 in early July. Consequently, those in the center spent a significant portion of their time in Santa Anita waiting in line for meals or to use the sanitary facilities.

The Assembly Center remained open for seven months, and in the meantime, Japanese-Americans took up jobs in camp at the camouflage net factory, the hospital or various administrative departments, and set up schools to ensure their children's education would not be interrupted. Transfer to War Relocation Authority camps began on August 26, 1942, when 901 Japanese-Americans left for Poston, Arizona, and over the next month the remaining Japanese-Americans were sent to Poston and several other camps. The Santa Anita Assembly Center closed on October 27, 1942.

== Course attributes ==
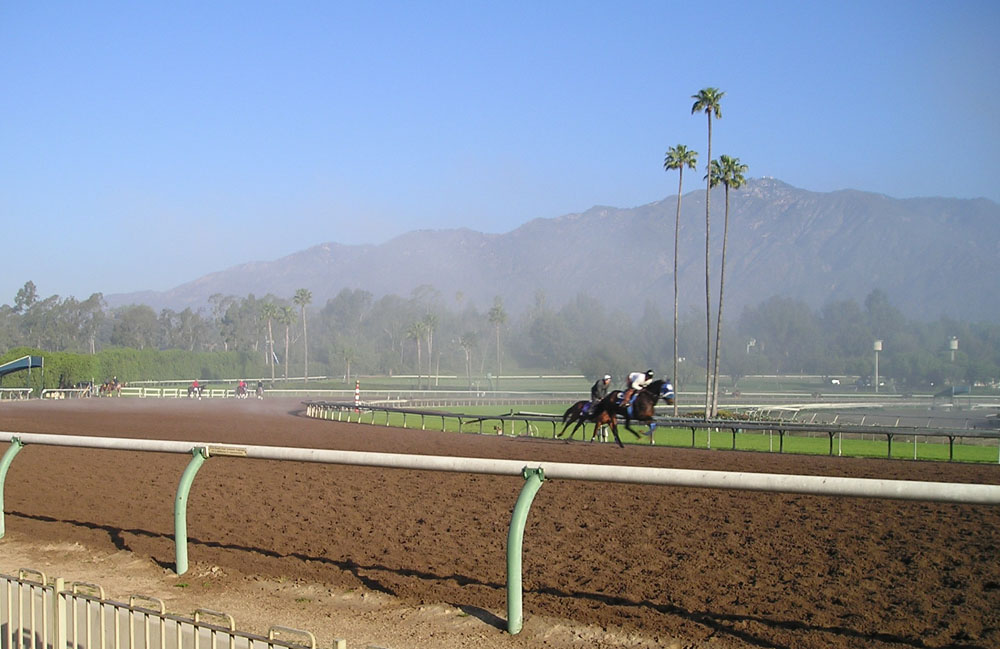
The Santa Anita track is set against the backdrop of the San Gabriel Mountains.

Santa Anita has a one-mile (1,609 m) natural dirt main track which rings a turf course measuring 0.9 mile, or 1,584 yards (1,448 m). In addition, it has an unusual hillside turf course which crosses the dirt and had been used mainly to run turf races at a distance of "about" 6½ furlongs (exact distance is 1,408.5 yards (1,287.9 m)), as well as longer races at 1.25 miles, 1.5 miles and 1 mile 1,232 yards. This type of track is one of the few of its kind in America.

In August 2020, Santa Anita broke ground on a new backstretch turf chute. The new turf chute is expected to be finished in time for the 2020/2021 winter meet, and will be used primarily for turf sprints at distances up to 6½ furlongs. Santa Anita effectively ended downhill turf sprints following an incident in the 2019 San Simeon Stakes; under their plans, the hillside turf course will continue to be used for distance races.

To comply with a State of California mandate, Santa Anita replaced its dirt racing surface with a new synthetic surface, a mixture of silica sand, synthetic fibers, elastic fiber, granulated rubber and a wax coating. The new track opened for training on Sept 4, 2007 and hosted its first live race on Sept 26, 2007. The track lost 11 racing dates in 2008 due to a drainage problem with the new material, but intensive maintenance and the addition of a liquid binder greatly improved the artificial surface. Santa Anita restored the all natural dirt surface in December 2010.

Santa Anita occupies 320 acres (1.3 km^{2}). It has a 1,100-foot (340 m)-long grandstand, which is a historic landmark that seats 26,000 guests. The grandstand facade is rendered in an Art Deco style and is largely the original from the 1930s. The track infield area, which resembles a park with picnic tables and large trees, can accommodate 50,000 or more guests. The Park also contains 61 barns, which house more than 2,000 horses, and an equine hospital.

== Proposed redevelopment ==
In 2000, the racetrack was named to America's "Most Endangered Historic Places" list.

In 2006, there was a proposal to close Santa Anita Park and use its location as the site of a new retail/entertainment complex. The Arcadia City Council approved a plan In April 2007 to develop an 830,000 square foot commercial, retail, and office complex in the south parking area, where the barracks that housed interned Japanese Americans during World War II are located. The proposal planned to tear down the South Ticket Gate and the 1938 Saddling Barn, and to install a simulcast facility in the center of the historic grandstand. In April 2008, a plan was approved to use large parts of the existing track parking lot to construct a mall, the "Shops at Santa Anita".

As of May 2011, the plans to build another mall next to Santa Anita Park were abandoned. Protests against the project by the Westfield Group, owner of the adjacent Westfield Santa Anita mall (built in 1974 on the site of the old barns and training track), and the bankruptcy of Magna International, owner of Santa Anita Park, were a factor in the decision.

== TV personalities ==
TVG, acquired Horse Racing TV (HRTV) in 2015, broadcasting from Santa Anita Park.

Talents from HRTV are now employed by TVG Network or XBTV (Xpressbet TV). Santa Anita talent now host the simulcast feed.

Expert American television personality commentators employed by HRTV:

- Kurt Hoover (1988–2012)
- Jon White (1993–2015) White writes a weekly column that is accessible at xpressbet.com and hrtv.com as well as an oddsmaker for Santa Anita Park.
- Carolyn Conley (1996–2000)
- John DeSantis (1996–2002)
- Jay Privman (1996–2002)
- Laffit Pincay III (2002–2015)
- Bill Seward (1988–2002)
- Michelle Yu (2012–2016)

Santa Anita Simulcast Hosts

- Megan Devine (2016–2018)

Megan has appeared as an on-air analyst at TVG, Turfway Park, Ellis Park, Horse Racing Radio Network (HRRN) and was fired from Santa Anita Park in November 2018.

== Racing ==
=== Graded events ===
The following Graded events were held at Santa Anita Park in 2025 with inaugural runnings in parentheses.

Grade I

- American Oaks (2002)
- American Pharoah Stakes (1970)
- Awesome Again Stakes (1982)
- Beholder Mile Stakes (1940)
- Frank E. Kilroe Mile (1960)
- Gamely Stakes (1939)
- Hollywood Gold Cup Stakes (1938)
- La Brea Stakes (1974)
- Malibu Stakes (1952)
- Rodeo Drive Stakes (1977)
- Santa Anita Derby (1935)
- Santa Anita Handicap (1935)
- Shoemaker Mile Stakes (1938)

Grade II

- Arcadia Stakes (1988)
- Buena Vista Stakes
- Californian Stakes
- Chandelier Stakes (1969)
- Charles Whittingham Stakes
- City of Hope Mile Stakes
- Eddie Delahoussaye Stakes
- Goldikova Stakes
- Joe Hernandez Stakes (2008)
- John Henry Turf Championship Stakes
- Laffit Pincay Jr. Stakes
- Las Cienegas Stakes
- Marathon Stakes
- Mathis Brothers Mile
- Palos Verdes Stakes (1936)
- Royal Heroine Stakes
- San Carlos Stakes
- San Felipe Stakes
- San Gabriel Stakes
- San Luis Rey Stakes
- San Marcos Stakes
- San Pasqual Stakes
- San Vicente Stakes
- Santa Anita Oaks (1935)
- Santa Anita Sprint Championship (1985)
- Santa Margarita Stakes (1935)
- Santa Maria Stakes
- Santa Monica Stakes
- Santa Ynez Stakes
- Summertime Oaks
- Triple Bend Stakes (1952)
- Twilight Derby
- Zenyatta Stakes (1993)

Grade III

- American Stakes (1938)
- Autumn Miss Stakes
- Chillingworth Stakes
- Daytona Stakes
- Desert Stormer Stakes
- John C. Harris Stakes (2012)
- Kona Gold Stakes
- L.A. Woman Stakes (1986)
- La Cañada Stakes
- Las Cienegas Handicap
- Las Flores Stakes
- Megahertz Stakes (2011)
- Midnight Lute Stakes
- Monrovia Stakes (1968)
- Providencia Stakes
- Robert B. Lewis Stakes
- Robert J. Frankel Stakes
- San Juan Capistrano Stakes
- San Luis Rey Stakes
- San Simeon Stakes
- Santa Ana Stakes
- Santa Maria Handicap
- Santa Monica Handicap
- Santa Ysabel Stakes
- Senorita Stakes
- Surfer Girl Stakes (2012)
- Sweet Life Stakes (2010)
- Thunder Road Stakes
- Tokyo City Cup
- Wilshire Stakes
- Zuma Beach Stakes (2012)

=== Other events ===
- Affirmed Stakes (1979)
- Astra Stakes (2015)
- Blue Norther Stakes
- California Cup Derby
- California Cup Oaks
- Cinema Stakes
- Desert Stormer Handicap
- Eddie Logan Stakes
- Honeymoon Stakes
- Landaluce Stakes
- Las Virgenes Stakes
- Lazaro Barrera Stakes
- Santa Barbara Stakes
- Santa Paula Stakes
- Senator Ken Maddy Stakes
- Speakeasy Stakes
- Thunder Road Handicap
- Tiznow Stakes

=== The Breeders' Cup at Santa Anita ===
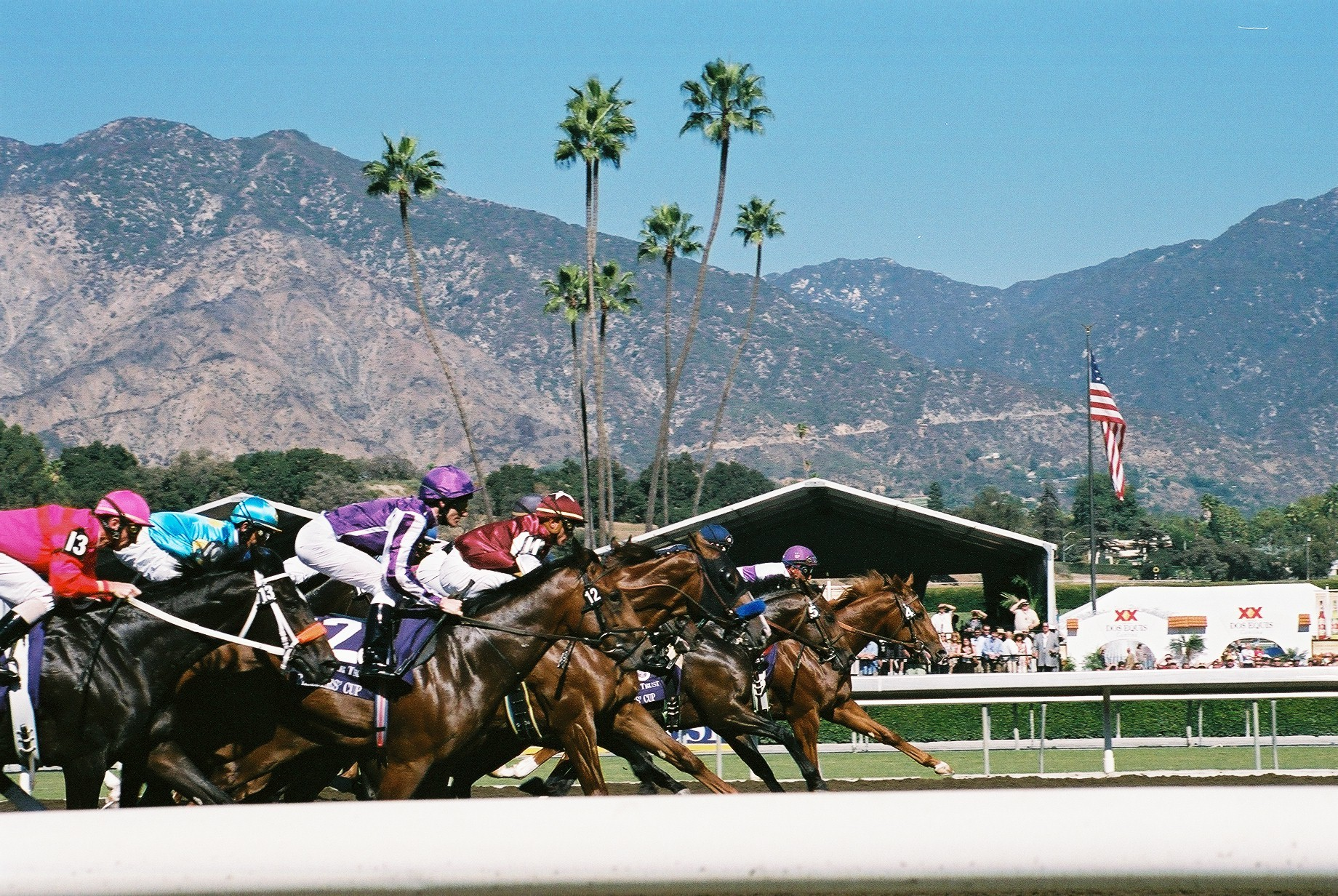
Start of the Breeders' Cup Juvenile in 2008

In 2023, Santa Anita will host the Breeders' Cup for a record 11th time. Highlights of the previous events include:

- 1986 - Lady's Secret wins the Distaff on her way to becoming Horse of the Year
- 1993 - Arcangues wins the Classic in the biggest upset in the race's history
- 2003 - Trainer Richard Mandella wins a record four races including the Classic
- 2008 - Overseas based runners win five races including the Classic
- 2009 - Zenyatta becomes the first (and to date only) mare to win the Classic
- 2012 - Wise Dan wins the Mile on his way to a Horse of the Year title
- 2013 - Wise Dan goes back-to-back
- 2014 - Bayern upsets California Chrome and Shared Belief in the Classic
- 2016 - Beholder wins the Distaff in a thrilling stretch battle over the previously undefeated Songbird.
- 2016 - Arrogate wins the Classic in a thriller over the heavy favorite California Chrome.
- 2019 - Storm the Court upsets the field to win the Juvenile by a neck at 45-1.

== Event venue ==
Santa Anita Park is also an event venue, most notably for popular food festival 626 Night Market. Since 2013, the event draws up to 100,000 attendees per 3-day weekend, four times a year during the summer. More than 250 vendors sell food, merchandise, crafts and art. There is also a stage with live music, an Art Walk, cosplay contest and b-boy dance competitions.

Arcadia High School holds its annual graduation ceremony at Santa Anita Park during the month of June and holds alumni reunions during September and October.

Santa Anita also has a partnership dating back to 1995 with Ohi Racecourse in Shinagawa, Tokyo – a National Association of Racing (NAR) venue that hosts a number of Japan's Grade I dirt races including the Tokyo Daishōten. Both venues have a race that references the other – Santa Anita has the Tokyo City Cup, while Ohi has the Santa Anita Trophy. Santa Anita also holds Japan Family Day as part of the partnership, which includes a cosplay contest.

== In popular culture ==
Cesario and Special Week standees at Santa Anita Park on display during the October 2026 Cosplay Trackside event.

Santa Anita first appeared in Umamusume: Pretty Derby, a franchise about girls personifying mainly Japanese racehorses, as the venue for the American Oaks, including as a part of the game's story based on Cesario winning the race at Hollywood Park in 2005. This led to a group of fans meeting in cosplay for Japan Family Day as characters from the series and creating Cosplay Trackside, which has held events for the American Oaks including when franchise creator Cygames became the race's main sponsor in 2025 and on the day of the Preakness Stakes on the other side of the country in 2026. Andrew Arthur, Director of Marketing for the track, said about the event, "The Cosplay Trackside event gave a space to a fun and active group that is also excited about horse racing and Santa Anita Park. We look forward to putting on events like this in the future and continuing to embrace this community."

== See also ==
- Luck (TV series)
- Santa Anita Ordnance Training Center
- Arcadia County Park (formerly Santa Anita Recreational Park)

== Bibliography ==
- Bedford, Julian (1989). The World Atlas of Horse Racing. Hamlyn. ISBN 978-0600563556.
