= Wild Again =

American-bred Thoroughbred racehorse

- Sire: Icecapade
- Grandsire: Nearctic
- Dam: Bushel-n-Peck
- Damsire: Khaled
- Sex: Stallion
- Foaled: 1980
- Died: December 5, 2008
- Country: United States
- Colour: Dark Brown
- Breeder: W. Paul Little
- Owner: Black Chip Stables
- Trainer: Vincent Timphony
- Record: 28: 8-7-4
- Earnings: $2,204,829

Major wins
- New Orleans Handicap (1984); Oaklawn Handicap (1984); Meadowlands Cup Handicap (1984); Breeders' Cup Classic (1984)
- Last updated on October 2, 2020

Wild Again (1980 – December 5, 2008) was an American Thoroughbred racehorse by Icecapade out of Bushel-n-Peck (by Khaled). He was given basic training by Tommy Akin, but for the majority of his career was trained by Vincent Timphony. Wild Again was bred in Kentucky by W. Paul Little and owned by Black Chip Stables, a nom de course for the racing partnership of Texans William Allen and Ron Volkman and the Californian Terry Beall. Wild Again is most famous for winning the inaugural Breeders' Cup Classic in 1984 over Slew o' Gold and Gate Dancer in a famous stretch run where all three battled head-to-head to the finish line. In a thrilling conclusion to the richest race in history during that time, long shot Wild Again survived both a wild bumping match in the stretch with Slew o' Gold and Gate Dancer and a steward's inquiry to win the $3 million Breeders' Cup Classic at Hollywood Park Racetrack. The three battled down the stretch with Wild Again bearing out and shifting his path away from the rail and Gate Dancer "lugging in" towards the rail, squeezing out Slew O' Gold. Wild Again finished a head in front of Gate Dancer with Slew o' Gold less than a length behind.

Wild Again, ridden by substitute jockey Pat Day, ended up in front by a head over Gate Dancer and Slew o' Gold - sandwiched between the two for the final furlong - was third by one-half length. After the long steward's inquiry, Slew o' Gold was moved up to second because of interference by Gate Dancer, the Preakness Stakes winner. Steward Alfred Shelhamer pointed out in the films that Wild Again's path through the stretch didn't waver more than six inches.

"If you look at the harrow marks in the track," said Shelhamer, "you'll notice Wild Again never leaves his path, but Gate Dancer comes over quite a bit at the sixteenth pole and bothers both horses."

The dark brown colt ran in 28 races in his four-year career, winning 8, placing 7 times, and coming in third on four occasions.

Year by year record:

- 1982 = 7: 2-3-0 -- $33,700
- 1983 = 1: 0-0-0 -- $0
- 1984 = 16: 6-1-4 -- $2,054,409
- 1985 = 4: 0-3-0 -- $116,720
- Totals = 28: 8-7-4 -- $2,204,829

Aside from winning the first Breeders' Cup Classic, to which he had to be supplemented for a fee of $360,000, Wild Again won the Grade I Meadowlands Cup Handicap, the Grade II New Orleans Handicap and the Grade II Oaklawn Handicap in which he broke the track record by almost two seconds.

== At stud ==
When he retired from racing, Wild Again stood at stud at Three Chimneys Farm where he became a successful sire. Among his sons and daughters are:

- Wild Waltz - won Yugoslavian Cup 1992–1994, Champion in Yugoslavia 1994
- Born Wild - won Austrian Derby, Champion three-year-old in Austria
- Elmhurst - winner of the 1997 Breeders' Cup Sprint
- Milwaukee Brew - won the 2002 & 2003 Santa Anita Handicap
- Offlee Wild - wins include the Suburban Handicap, Holy Bull Stakes, Massachusetts Handicap
- Sarava - won the 2002 Belmont Stakes
- Shine Again - multiple Grade I winner for Allaire du Pont
- Wild Rush - millionaire multiple Grade I winner
- Wild Wonder - multiple stakes winner, set new Track Record while winning the 1998 Longacres Mile Handicap
- Wilderness Song - multiple stakes winner in Canada and the United States, 1992 Canadian Champion Older Mare

Wild Again was pensioned from stud duties in October 2004 and euthanized in December 2008 due to the infirmities of old age. He was laid to rest at Three Chimneys Farm Cemetery where Slew o' Gold was laid to rest the year prior in 2007. Wild Again was the last survivor among the winners of the first Breeders' Cup.

== Pedigree ==
Pedigree of Wild Again, dark bay/brown colt, 1980
Sire Icecapade	Nearctic	Nearco	Pharos
Sire Icecapade	Nearctic	Nearco	Nogara
Sire Icecapade	Nearctic	Lady Angela	Hyperion
Sire Icecapade	Nearctic	Lady Angela	Sister Sarah
Sire Icecapade	Shenanigans	Native Dancer	Polynesian
Sire Icecapade	Shenanigans	Native Dancer	Geisha
Sire Icecapade	Shenanigans	Bold Irish	Fighting Fox
Sire Icecapade	Shenanigans	Bold Irish	Erin
Dam Bushel-n-Peck	Khaled	Hyperion	Gainsborough
Dam Bushel-n-Peck	Khaled	Hyperion	Selene
Dam Bushel-n-Peck	Khaled	Eclair	Ethnarch
Dam Bushel-n-Peck	Khaled	Eclair	Black Ray
Dam Bushel-n-Peck	Dama	Dante	Nearco
Dam Bushel-n-Peck	Dama	Dante	Rosy Legend
Dam Bushel-n-Peck	Dama	Clovelly	Mahmoud
Dam Bushel-n-Peck	Dama	Clovelly	Udaipur (family: 3-e)
