= 2018 Road to the Kentucky Oaks =

The 2018 Road to the Kentucky Oaks was a points system by which Thoroughbred fillies qualified for the 2018 Kentucky Oaks, held on May 4. The races were held from September 2017 (when the fillies were age two) through April 2018 (when they turned three). The top four finishers in the specified races earned points, with the highest point values awarded in the major preparatory races held in late March or early April. Earnings in non-restricted stakes acted as a tie breaker.

Fillies who instead wished to enter the Kentucky Derby had to earn the necessary points in the races on the Road to the Kentucky Derby: points earned on the Road to the Kentucky Oaks were not transferable. However, if a filly did earn qualifying points for the Derby by racing in open company, those points also counted towards qualifying for the Oaks.

== Changes from 2017 ==
Churchill Downs announced the schedule for the 2018 Road to the Kentucky Oaks on August 31, 2017. The only changes from the 2017 season were:

- Race change: Suncoast Stakes added.
- Point system changes: Points for the Bourbonette Stakes reduced to 20-8-4-2.

The Delta Princess Stakes, which would have been the 31st race in the series, was cancelled in the aftermath of Hurricane Harvey.

== Standings ==
The following table shows the points earned in the eligible races. Entries for the Kentucky Oaks were taken on April 30. The race was won by Monomoy Girl, who qualified by winning the Rachel Alexandra and Ashland Stakes.

Rank	Horse	Points	Owner	Trainer	Eligible Earnings (Note: Non-Restricted Stakes Earnings, used as a tie-breaker)	Ref
1	Midnight Bisou	160	Allan Racing & Bloom Racing	William Spawr	$440,000	
2	Monomoy Girl	154	Michael Dubb & Monomoy Racing	Brad H. Cox	$506,150	
3	Sassy Sienna	115	Zayat Stables LLC	Brad H. Cox	$318,000	
4	My Miss Lilly	112	Courtland Farms	Mark Hennig	$219,400	
5	Chocolate Martini	100	Double Doors Racing, LLC	Thomas M. Amoss	$240,000	
6	Coach Rocks	100	Roddy Valente, RAP Racing and West Point Thoroughbreds	Dale L. Romans	$145,700	
7	Rayya (Note: Rayya earned 40 points in the Road to the Kentucky Derby by finishing second in the UAE Derby, which was added to the 50 points she earned on the Road to the Kentucky Oaks by winning the UAE Oaks)	90	Sheikh Rashid Bin Humaid Al Nuaimi	Doug Watson (Note: Rayya will be trained by Bob Baffert upon arrival in the United States)	$600,000	
8	Wonder Gadot	84	Gary Barber	Mark Casse	$440,002	
9	Eskimo Kisses	80	Magdalena Racing, Gainesway Stable & Harold Lerner	Kenneth G. McPeek	$180,000	
10	Take Charge Paula	70	Peter Deutsch	Kiaran P. McLaughlin	$372,720	
bypassing Oaks	Midnight Disguise	70	William Wilmot & Joan Taylor	Linda Rice	$195,000	
bypassing Oaks	Cosmic Burst	62	Norma Lee Stockseth & Todd Dunn	Donnie K. Von Hemel	$212,500	
not nominated	Sara Street	60	Godolphin Racing	Kiaran P. McLaughlin	$372,720	
injured	Blamed	50	Cleber J. Massey	Joel H. Marr	$100,000	
injured	Fly So High	50	Phipps Stable	C. R. McGaughey III	$120,280	
bypassing Oaks	Thirteen Squared	41	Arnold Zetcher	Bob Baffert	$112,000	
	Amy's Challenge	40	Novogratz Racing Stables Inc	McLean Robertson	$200,000	
not nominated	Spectator	40	Rick & Sharon Waller	Phil D'Amato	$174,320	
11	Patrona Margarita	35	Seltzer Thoroughbreds	W. Bret Calhoun	$174,320	
12	Classy Act	30	Carl R Moore Management LLC	W. Bret Calhoun	$56,000	
bypassing Oaks	Caledonia Road	24	Zoom and Fish Stable & Charlie Spring	Ralph Nicks	$1,180,000	
bypassing Oaks	Princess Warrior	24	Evan, Matthew and Andrew Trommer	Kenneth G. McPeek	$128,350	
bypassing Oaks	Dream Tree	20	Phoenix Thoroughbreds	Bob Baffert	$360,000	
not nominated	Go Noni Go	20	Three Diamonds Farm	Mike Maker	$96,104	
not nominated	Kram	20	Chris Coleman & Brad King	Todd Fincher	$89,000	
	Red Ruby	15	Sandra Sexton & Brandi Nicholson	Kellyn Gorder	$85,000	
15	Exuberance	15	Craig Upham	Ian Kruljac	$82,000	
not nominated	Alluring Star	12	Baoma Corporation	Bob Baffert	$400,000	
not nominated	Separationofpowers	12	Klaravich Stables	Chad Brown	$375,000	
13	Heavenhasmynikki	11	Looch Racing Stables	Anthony Quartarolo	$29,100	
not nominated	Moonshine Memories	10	Bridlewood Farm, S. Magnier, D. Smith & M. Tabor	Simon Callaghan	$380,000	
	Heavenly Love	10	Debby Oxley	Mark Casse	$245,000	
not nominated	Andina Del Sur	10	Don Alberto Stable	Thomas Albertrani	$134,100	
	Road to Victory	10	Gary Barber & John C. Oxley	Mark Casse	$115,230	
	Stronger Than Ever	10	Fern Circle Stables	Kenneth G. McPeek	$105,000	
	Gas Station Sushi	10	Riley Racing, Megan & Jason Tackitt & Mike Hensen	Richard Baltas	$90,000	
	Paved (Note: Paved earned points by beating colts in the El Camino Real Derby, part of the Road to the Kentucky Derby)	10	Ciaglia Racing LLC & Eclipse Thoroughbred Partners	Michael W. McCarthy	$60,000	
	C. S. Incharge	10	Pacella, Jones & Shoop	Dale L. Romans	$65,000	
not nominated	Charge Back	10	Winchell Thoroughbreds (Joan & Ron Winchell)	Steve Asmussen	$20,000	
	Spring Lily	10	Pam & Martin Wygod	John Shirreffs	$12,000	
not nominated	Tell Your Mama	10	Loooch Racing Stables, Inc.	Robert B. Hess Jr.	$1,600	
not nominated	Sultry	9	Joseph Sutton	Eddie Kenneally	$52,500	
14 (Note: The connections of Kelly's Humor paid a late nomination fee to make her eligible for the Oaks)	Kelly's Humor	8	Ike & Dawn Thrash	Brad H. Cox	$124,910	
	In the Mood	8	Stephen S. & Brenda Sandy	Stephen S. Sandy	$49,050	
not nominated	Steph Being Steph	6	Blinkers on Racing, Bennett, Cahee, Georgetti et al.	Brian Koriner	$108,800	
not nominated	Blonde Bomber	5	Arindel Farm	Stanley I. Gold	$230,640	
	Daisy	5	Fox Hill Farms	John Servis	$122,500	
not nominated	Shamrock Rose	5	Conrad Farms	Mark Casse	$10,000	
	Yesterday's News	5	Reddam Racing	Simon Callaghan	$72,345	
	Sweetsongofthenile	5	Ferro Trust, Meritage LLC & Connor	Ed Moger Jr.	$9,000	
not nominated	Piedi Bianchi	4	Nice Guys Stables, Bick & Oringer	Doug F. O'Neill	$192,000	
not nominated	Bella Be Ready	5	Tammy Town Thoroughbreds	Henry Dominguez	$8,000	
not nominated	Oldfashioned Style	4	Leonard Green	Gary C. Contessa	$52,000	
not nominated	Maurer Power	4	Cash is King	John Servis	$50,000	
not nominated	Maya Malibu	2	My Meadowview Farm	H. Graham Motion	$110,000	
	Sunny Skies	2	Normandy Farm	Kenneth G. McPeek	$83,644	
not nominated	Win the War	2	John C. Oxley & Gary Barber	Mark Casse	$70,992	
not nominated	Dancing	2	Live Oak Plantation	Mark Casse	$40,000	
not nominated	Cash Out	2	G. Watts Humphrey Jr.	George R. Arnold II	$33,600	
	Layla Noor	2	Lael Stables	Arnaud Delacour	$32,500	
	Mihrab	2	RMJ Stables	H. Graham Motion	$16,000	
	Missive	2	Pin Oak Stud	Michael Stidham	$15,000	
not nominated	Hail	2	Juddmonte Farms	William I. Mott	$10,000	
not nominated	Dancing Belle	1	Big Chief Racing, Rocket O Ranch et al.	J. Keith Desormeaux	$76,000	
not nominated	Purrfect Miss	1	Orlando DiRenzo & Southfield Farm	Jeremiah Englehart	$20,000	
	Tyfosha	1	Zedan Racing Stables	Doug F. O'Neill	$11,250	
	Dessert Honeys	1	Homewrecker Racing	Eddie Kenneally	$9,300	
not nominated	Primo Extremo	1	Allied Racing Stable	Jason DaCosta	$9,300	
not nominated	Wealth Effect	1	Klaravich Stables	Chad Brown	$5,000	
not nominated	So Refined	1	Gary Broad	J. Kent Sweezey	$5,000	

- Winner of Kentucky Oaks in **bold**
- Entrants for Kentucky Oaks in pink
- Injured/Not nominated/Bypassing the race in gray

== Race results ==
=== Prep season ===
Kentucky Oaks prep season
Race	Distance	Purse	Track	Date	1st	2nd	3rd	4th	Ref
Pocahontas	1 1/16 miles	$200,000	Churchill Downs	Sep 16, 2017	Patrona Margarita	Kelly's Humor	Sunny Skies	Primo Extremo	
Chandelier	1 1/16 miles	$300,000	Santa Anita	Sep 30, 2017	Moonshine Memories	Alluring Star	Piedi Bianchi	Dancing Belle	
Alcibiades	1 1/16 miles	$400,000	Keeneland	Oct 6, 2017	Heavenly Love	Princess Warrior	Dancing	Sassy Sienna	
Frizette	1 mile	$400,000	Belmont	Oct 8, 2017	Separationofpowers	Caledonia Road	Maya Malibu	Purrfect Miss	
Breeders' Cup Juvenile Fillies	1 1/16 miles	$2,000,000	Santa Anita	Nov 4, 2017	Caledonia Road	Alluring Star	Blonde Bomber	Separationofpowers	
Delta Downs Princess	1 mile	$400,000	Delta Downs	Nov 18, 2017	cancelled				
Golden Rod	1 1/16 miles	$200,000	Churchill Downs	Nov 25, 2017	Road to Victory	Monomoy Girl	Cash Out	Dessert Honey	
Demoiselle	1 1/8 miles	$250,000	Aqueduct	Dec 2, 2017	Wonder Gadot	Maurer Power	Layla Noor	Daisy	
Starlet	1 1/16 miles	$300,000	Los Alamitos	Dec 9, 2017	Dream Tree	Yesterdays News	Piedi Bianchi	Exuberance	
Santa Ynez	6 1/2 furlongs	$125,000	Santa Anita	Jan 7, 2018	Midnight Bisou	Steph Being Steph	Win the War	Yesterday's News	
Silverbulletday	1 mile 70 yards	$150,000	Fair Grounds	Jan 13, 2018	Stronger Than Ever	Wonder Gadot	Missive	Blonde Bomber	
Busanda	1 mile 70 yards	$100,000	Aqueduct	Jan 25, 2018	Midnight Disguise	Oldfashioned Style	Hail	Wealth Effect	
Forward Gal	7 furlongs	$200,000	Gulfstream	Feb 3, 2018	Take Charge Paula	Sultry	My Miss Lilly	Heavenhasmynikki	
Las Virgenes	1 mile	$300,000	Santa Anita	Feb 4, 2018	Dream Tree	Exuberance	Steph Being Steph	Thirteen Squared	
Suncoast Stakes	1 mile 40 yards	$150,000	Tampa Bay	Feb 10, 2018	C. S. Incharge	Daisy	Mihrab	So Refined	
Martha Washington	1 mile	$125,000	Oaklawn	Feb 10, 2018	Red Ruby	Sassy Sienna	Cosmic Burst	Tyfosha	
Note: 1st=10 points; 2nd=4 points; 3rd=2 points; 4th=1 point, except the Juvenile Fillies, for which the points are doubled

=== Championship Series ===
Kentucky Oaks Championship Series
First leg of series
Race	Distance	Purse	Track	Date	1st	2nd	3rd	4th	Ref
UAE Oaks	1,900 metres ~1 3/16 miles	$250,000	Meydan	Mar 1, 2018	Rayya	Expressly	Winter Lightning	Sa'Ada	
Rachel Alexandra	1 1/16 miles	$200,000	Fair Grounds	Feb 17, 2018	Monomoy Girl	Classy Act	Wonder Gadot	Patrona Margarita	
Busher	1 1/16 miles	$125,000	Aqueduct	Mar 3, 2018	Midnight Disguise	Sara Street	My Miss Lilly	Shamrock Rose	
Davona Dale	1 1/16 miles	$200,000	Gulfstream	Mar 3, 2018	Fly So High	Take Charge Paula	Heavenhasmynikki	Sultry	
Santa Ysabel	1 1/16 miles	$100,000	Santa Anita	Mar 3, 2018	Midnight Bisou	Thirteen Squared	Spring Lily	Sweetsongofthenile	
Honeybee	1 1/16 miles	$200,000	Oaklawn	Mar 10, 2018	Cosmic Burst	Amy's Challenge	Sassy Siena	Red Ruby	
Sunland Park Oaks	1 1/16 miles	$200,000	Sunland	Mar 25, 2018	Blamed	Kram	Charge Back	Bella Be Ready	
Note: 1st=50 points; 2nd=20 points; 3rd=10 points; 4th=5 points
Second leg of series
Race	Distance	Purse	Track	Date	1st	2nd	3rd	4th	Ref
Fair Grounds Oaks	1 1/16 miles	$400,000	Fair Grounds	Mar 24, 2018	Chocolate Martini	Eskimo Kisses	Wonder Gadot	Classy Act	
Gulfstream Oaks	1 1/16 miles	$250,000	Gulfstream	Mar 31, 2018	Coach Rocks	Take Charge Paula	Princess Warrior	Tell Your Mama	
Ashland	1 1/16 miles	$500,000	Keeneland	Apr 7, 2018	Monomoy Girl	Eskimo Kisses	Patrona Margarita	Andina Del Sur	
Santa Anita Oaks	1 1/16 miles	$400,000	Santa Anita	Apr 7, 2018	Midnight Bisou	Spectator	Thirteen Squared	Exuberance	
Gazelle	1 1/8 miles	$300,000	Aqueduct	Apr 7, 2018	My Miss Lilly	Sara Street	Virginia Key	Midnight Disguise	
Fantasy	1 1/16 miles	$400,000	Oaklawn	Apr 13, 2018	Sassy Siena	Wonder Gadot	Amy's Challenge	Cosmic Burst	
Note: 1st=100 points; 2nd=40 points; 3rd=20 points; 4th=10 points
"Wild Card"
Race	Distance	Purse	Track	Date	1st	2nd	3rd	4th	Ref
Bourbonette Oaks	1 mile	$100,000	Turfway	Mar 17, 2018	Go Noni Go	In the Mood	Homemade Salsa	Hey Negrita	
Beaumont	7 furlongs	$150,000	Keeneland	Apr 8, 2018	Gas Station Sushi	Kellys Humour	Uppercut	Happy Like A Fool	
Bourbonette Oaks: 1st=20 points; 2nd=8 points; 3rd=4 points; 4th=2 points Beaumont Stakes: 1st=10 points; 2nd=4 points; 3rd=2 points; 4th=1 points

== See also ==
- 2018 Road to the Kentucky Derby
