= 2017 Road to the Kentucky Oaks =

The 2017 Road to the Kentucky Oaks is a points system by which three-year-old fillies qualified for the 2017 Kentucky Oaks, held on May 5. The point system replaced a previous qualifying system which was based on graded stakes earnings.

Churchill Downs announced the schedule for the 2017 Road to the Kentucky Oaks on September 13, 2016. The only change from the 2016 season is that the Mazarine Stakes is no longer included, bringing the total number of races down to 30.

== Standings ==
The following table shows the points earned in the eligible races. Farrell qualified first with 170 points, earned by winning the Golden Rod, Silverbulletday, Rachel Alexandra and Fair Grounds Oaks. The Kentucky Oaks was won by Abel Tasman, who qualified with 70 points by finishing second in the Santa Ysabel and Santa Anita Oaks.

2017 point standings
Rank	Horse	Points	Owner	Trainer	Earnings (Note: Non-Restricted Stakes Earnings, used as a tie-breaker)	Ref
1	Farrell	170	Coffeepot Stables	Wayne Catalano	$573,407	
2	Miss Sky Warrior	160	Arlene's Sun Star Stable	Kelly Breen	$592,840	
3	Ever So Clever	106	Clearview Stable	Steven Asmussen	$306,750	
4	Sailor's Valentine	100	Semaphore Racing & Homewrecker Racking	Eddie Kenneally	$307,014	
5	Paradise Woods	100	Herman Sarkowsy & Martin Wygod	Richard Mandella	$240,000	
6	Salty	100	Barber, Baccari Racing & Prince	Mark Casse	$150,350	
-	It Tiz Well	74	Tommy Town Thoroughbreds	Jerry Hollendorfer	$240,000	
injured	Unique Bella	70	Don Alberto Stable	Jerry Hollendorfer	$300,000	
**7**	**Abel Tasman**	**70**	**Clearsky Farms and China Horse Club**	Bob Baffert (Note: Abel Tasman was originally trained by Simon Callaghan but was moved to Bob Baffert's stable on March 9)	**$200,000**	
8	Daddys Lil Darling	60	Normandy Farm	Kenneth McPeek	$439,240	
-	Chanel's Legacy	51	Poindexter Thoroughbreds	Lynn Chleborad	$206,667	
9	Tequilita	50	Dorothy Matz	Michael Matz	$227,540	
-	Nomorerichblondes	50	Buti Bintooq Almarri	A Bin Harmash	$200,000	
10	Lockdown	50	Juddmonte Farms	William I. Mott	$120,000	
-	Ghalia	50	Sumaya U.S. Stable	Todd Pletcher	$120,000	
-	Yorkiepoo Princess	50	Danny Chen	Ed Barker	$90,000	
-	Purely a Dream	50	Living the Dream Racing	Kenneth McPeek	$200,000	
11	Wicked Lick	49	Lee Mauberret	Brendan Walsh	$118,428	
12	Vexatious	40	Calumet Farm	Neil Drysdale	$80,000	
13	Jordan's Henny	40	Ervine Woolsey & Ralph Kinder	Michael Tomlinson	$66,410	
injured	Champagne Room	23	Ciaglia, Gulliver Racing et al.	Peter Eurton	$1,298,000	
-	Benner Island	20	Shortleaf Stable	Brad H. Cox	$55,823	
-	Midnight Chica	20	Sheikh Ahmed bin Rashid Al Maktoum	D Selvaratnam	$50,000	
-	Someday Soon	20	Tommy Ligon	William Van Meter	$52,667	
-	Awesome Boss	20	Peter Callahan	Kenneth McPeek	$18,600	
injured	Valadorna	18	Stonestreet Stables	Mark Casse	$360,000	
14	Mopotism	16	Reddam Racing	Doug O'Neill	$145,000	
-	Shane's Girlfriend	12	ERJ Racing, W C Racing & Dennis O'Neill	Doug O'Neill	$268,000	
-	Tapped	11	LNJ Foxwoods	Jerry Hollendorfer	$68,000	
15	Summer Luck	11	Gary Barber	Mark Casse	$37,700	
-	Torrent	12	Westrock Stables	Ron Moquett	$62,500	
-	Dancing Rags	10	Chadds Ford Stable	H. Graham Motion	$260,000	
-	Yellow Agate	10	China Horse Club	Christophe Clement	$240,345	
-	Noted and Quoted	10	Speedway Stable	Bob Baffert	$218,000	
-	Elate	10	Claiborne Farm & Adele Dilschneider	William I. Mott	$30,000	
-	Spooky Woods	10	West Point Thoroughbreds	Jerry Hollendorfer	$25,000	
-	What What What	10	W.C. Racing, Westside Rentals & Haymes	Doug O'Neill	$22,000	
-	Daria's Angel	10	Wayne Sanders & Larry Hirsch	Bret Calhoun	$16,000	
-	Nonna Bella	10	Repole Stable	Todd Pletcher	$12,125	
-	Darkwingsoverdubai	10	KMN Racing	Jerry Hollendorfer	$9,300	
-	Complimenti	10	Kildare Stud - Frankie O'Connor	D Watson	$37,500	
-	Libby's Tail	9	Dubb, Taylor, Simon et al.	Rudy Rodriguez	$125,000	
-	American Gal	8	Kaleem Shah	Bob Baffert	$240,000	
-	No Sweat	7	Starlight Racing	Todd Pletcher	$10,000	
-	Tapa Tapa Tapa	5	Beau Ravine	Timothy Hamm	$42,321	
-	Melesina (IRE)	5	Nick Bradley Racing	Richard Fahey	$56,424	
-	Modacious	5	Cash is King & L and C Racing	Robert Reid	$9,100	
-	Mistressofthenight	5	Beeman Family Trust, Greg Hall & Sayjay Racing	Richard Baltas	$6,345	
-	Pretty City Dancer	4	John C. Oxley	Mark Casse	$239,300	
-	With Honors	4	LNJ Foxwoods	J. Keith Desormeaux	$132,345	
-	Jamyson 'n Ginger	4	Magic Cap Stables	Rudy Rodriguez	$120,000	
-	Cajun Delta Dawn	4	Curtis G Mikkelsen	David Fawkes	$117,105	
-	My Sweet Stella	4	Tommy Town Thoroughbreds	Jerry Hollendorfer	$27,000	
-	Gris Gris	3	Naveed Chowhan	Bennie Flinit	$37,300	
-	Fun	2	Dennis Farkas	Ian Wilkes	$89,500	
-	Bling on the Music	2	Keene Thoroughbreds	J. Caldwell	$84,200	
-	Flatter Up	2	Wayne Sanders & Larry Hirsch	Bret Calhoun	$60,000	
-	Colorful Charades	2	Michael Ryan	Rudy Rodriguez	$40,345	
-	Zapperkat	2	J K Racing & Chandler Bruce	Richard Baltas	$36,000	
-	Bonita Bianca	2	Dubb, Bethlehem Stables & Imperio	Rudy Rodrigues	$30,000	
-	Brahms Cat	2	Bluestone Thoroughbreds	Larry Bates	$26,475	
-	Miss Southern Miss	1	Peter Cantrell	J. Keith Desormeaux	$143,000	
-	Nonna Mela	1	St Elias Stable	Todd Pletcher	$140,000	
-	Caroline Test	1	Edward Seltzer & Beverly Anderson	Ben Colebrook	$106,500	
-	Dream Dancing	1	John Oxley	Mark Casse	$84,360	
-	Lovely Bernadette	1	James Miller	James DiVito	$61,851	
-	Princess Karen	1	Jeffrey L. Bonde & Edward Brown Jr.	Jeffrey L. Bonde	$12,000	
-	Summertime Sky	1	John Oxley	Mark Casse	$6,000	
-	Frank's Folly	1	George Hall	Kelly Breen	$5,000	

- Winner of Kentucky Oaks in **bold**
- Entrants for Kentucky Oaks in pink
- "Also eligible" for Kentucky Oaks in green
- Sidelined/Inactive/Oaks no longer under consideration in gray

== Race results ==
=== Prep season ===
Kentucky Oaks prep season
Race	Distance	Purse	Track	Date	1st	2nd	3rd	4th	Ref
Pocahontas	1 1/16 miles	$200,000	Churchill Downs	Sep 17, 2016	Daddys Lil Darling	Ever So Clever	Bling On the Music	Dream Dancing	
Chandelier	1 1/16 miles	$300,000	Santa Anita	Oct 1, 2016	Noted and Quoted	With Honers	Zapperkat	Champagne Room	
Alcibiades	1 1/16 miles	$400,000	Keeneland	Oct 7, 2016	Dancing Rags	Daddys Lil Darling	Fun	Caroline Test	
Frizette	1 mile	$400,000	Belmont	Oct 8, 2016	Yellow Agate	Libby's Tail	Colorful Charades	Nonna Mela	
Breeders' Cup Juvenile Fillies	1 1/16 miles	$2,000,000	Santa Anita	Nov 5, 2016	Champagne Room	Valdorna	American Gal	Daddys Lil Darling	
Delta Downs Princess	1 mile	$400,000	Delta Downs	Nov 19, 2016	Shane's Girlfriend	Cajun Delta Dawn	Flatter Up	Chanel's Legacy	
Demoiselle	1 1/8 miles	$300,000	Aqueduct	Nov 26, 2016	Miss Sky Warrior	Jamyson 'n Ginger	Bonita Bianca	Libby's Tail	
Golden Rod	1 1/16 miles	$200,000	Churchill Downs	Nov 26, 2016	Farrell	Daddys Lil Darling	Ever So Clever	Gris Gris	
Starlet	1 1/16 miles	$300,000	Los Alamitos	Dec 10, 2016	Abel Tasman	American Gal	Mopolitan	Tapped	
Santa Ynez	6 1/2 furlongs	$125,000	Santa Anita	Jan 8, 2017	Unique Bella	It Tiz Well	Shane's Girlfriend	Princess Karen	
Busanda	1 mile 70 yards	$100,000	Aqueduct	Jan 15, 2017	Lockdown	Libby's Tail	No Sweat	Frank's Folly	
Silverbulletday	1 mile 70 yards	$125,000	Fair Grounds	Jan 21, 2017	Farrell	Wicked Lick	Gris Gris	Summertime Sky	
Forward Gal	7 furlongs	$200,000	Gulfstream	Feb 4, 2017	Tequilita	Pretty City Dancer	Brahm's Cat	Summer Luck	
Las Virgenes	1 mile	$300,000	Santa Anita	Feb 5, 2017	Unique Bella	Mopotism	Champagne Room	Miss Southern Miss	
Martha Washington	1 mile	$100,000	Oaklawn	Feb 11, 2017	Chanel's Legacy	My Sweet Stella	Torrent	Lovely Bernadette	
Note: 1st=10 points; 2nd=4 points; 3rd=2 points; 4th=1 point

=== Championship Series ===
Kentucky Oaks Championship Series
First leg of series
Race	Distance	Purse	Track	Date	1st	2nd	3rd	4th	Ref
Rachel Alexandra	1 1/16 miles	$200,000	Fair Grounds	Feb 25, 2017	Farrell	Majestic Quality	Valadorna	Wicked Lick	
Busher	1 1/16 miles	$125,000	Aqueduct	Feb. 25, 2017	Yorkiepoo Princess	Full House	Tiz Rae Anna	No Sweat	
UAE Oaks	1,900 metres ~1 3/16 miles	$250,000	Meydan	Feb 25, 2017	Nomorerichblondes	Midnight Chica	Complimenti	Melesina	
Davona Dale	1 1/16 miles	$200,000	Gulfstream	Mar 4, 2017	Miss Sky Warrior	Jordan's Henny	Summer Luck	Modacious	
Santa Ysabel	1 1/16 miles	$100,000	Santa Anita	Mar 4, 2017	Unique Bella	Abel Tasman	Spooky Woods	Mistressofthenight	
Honeybee	1 1/16 miles	$200,000	Oaklawn	Mar 11, 2017	It Tiz Well	Benner Island	Elate	Tapa Tapa Tapa	
Bourbonette Oaks	1 mile	$100,000	Turfway	Mar 25, 2017	Purely a Dream	Awesome Boss	Darkwingsoverdubai	Gilded Lily	
Sunland Park Oaks	1 1/16 miles	$200,000	Sunland	Mar 26, 2017	Ghalia	Kell Paso	What What What	Conquest Slayer	
Note: 1st=50 points; 2nd=20 points; 3rd=10 points; 4th=5 points
Second leg of series
Race	Distance	Purse	Track	Date	1st	2nd	3rd	4th	Ref
Gulfstream Oaks	1 1/8 miles	$300,000	Gulfstream	Apr 1, 2017	Salty	Tequilita	Jordan's Henny	Nonna Bella	
Fair Grounds Oaks	1 1/16 miles	$500,000	Fair Grounds	Apr 1, 2017	Farrell	Wicked Lick	Vexatious	Daria's Angel	
Ashland	1 1/16 miles	$500,000	Keeneland	Apr 8, 2017	Sailor's Valentine	Daddy's Lil Darling	Someday Soon	Tapped	
Santa Anita Oaks	1 1/16 miles	$400,000	Santa Anita	Apr 8, 2017	Paradise Woods	Abel Tasman	It Tiz Well	Mopotism	
Gazelle	1 mile	$300,000	Aqueduct	Apr 8, 2017	Miss Sky Warrior	Lockdown	Full House	Stay Fond	
Fantasy	1 1/16 miles	$400,000	Oaklawn	Apr 14, 2017	Ever So Clever	Chanel's Legacy	Vexatious	Torrent	
Note: 1st=100 points; 2nd=40 points; 3rd=20 points; 4th=10 points
"Wild Card"
Race	Distance	Purse	Track	Date	1st	2nd	3rd	4th	Ref
Beaumont	7 furlongs	$150,000	Keeneland	Apr 9, 2017	Sweet Loretta	Sine Wave	Laney	Promises Broken	
Note: 1st=10 points; 2nd=4 points; 3rd=2 points; 4th=1 points

== See also ==
- 2017 Road to the Kentucky Derby
