= 2015 Road to the Kentucky Oaks =

The 2015 Road to the Kentucky Oaks was a points system by which three-year-old fillies qualified for the 2015 Kentucky Oaks. The point system replaced a previous qualifying system which was based on graded stakes earnings.

The 2015 season consisted of 31 races, 17 for the Kentucky Oaks Prep Season and 14 for the Kentucky Oaks Championship Series. Condo Commando was the leading qualifier with 161 points, earned by winning the Demoiselle (10 points), Busher (50 points) and Gazelle (100 points), plus a fourth-place finish in the Frizette. I'm a Chatterbox also finished with 161 points, earned by winning the Silverbulletday (10 points), Rachel Alexandra (50 points) and Fair Grounds Oaks (100 points), plus finishing fourth in the Golden Rod (1 point). The Oaks was won by Lovely Maria, who qualified with 120 points, earned by winning the Ashland Stakes (100 points) and finishing second in the Rachel Alexandra (20 points).

== Standings ==
2015 point standings
Rank	Horse	Points	Owner	Trainer	Earnings	References
1	Condo Commando	161	Michael Dubb, Bethlehem Stables & The Elkstone Group	Rudy Rodriguez	$535,000	
2	I'm a Chatterbox	161	Grayson Farm (Fletcher Gray)	Kenny McPeek	$430,714	
3	Stellar Wind	150	Hronis Racing	John Sadler		
4	Birdatthewire	130	Forum Racing	Dale Romans	$303,710	
5	**Lovely Maria**	120	Brereton C. Jones	Larry Jones		
6	Include Betty	100	Brereton Jones and Timothy Thornton	Thomas Proctor		
7	Oceanwave	60	Gary & Mary West	Wayne Catalano		
8	Angela Renee	57	Siena Farm LLC (Anthony Manganaro, Ignacio Patino & David Pope)	Todd A. Pletcher	$302,000	
9	Sarah Sis	54	Joe Ragsdale	Ingrid Mason	$149,600	
---	Maybellene	52	Natalie J. Baffert	Bob Baffert	$187,144	
---	Ekati's Phaeton	51	Phaedrus Flights LLC	Bill Kaplan	$201,740	
---	Local Time-GB	50	Godolphin Racing LLC	Saeed bin Suroor	$345,269	
10	Eskenformoney	50	StarLadies Racing	Todd Pletcher	$66,900	
---	Don't Leave Me	50	Pin Oak Stable	Malcolm Pierce	$88,293	
11	Puca	45	Donegal Racing	Bill Mott		
---	Take Charge Brandi	40	Willis D. Horton	D. Wayne Lukas	$1,653,726	
12	Shook Up	40	Regis Racing	Steve Asmussen	$83,500	
13	Forever Unbridled	34	Charles E. Fipke	Dallas Stewart	$82,500	
---	Light the City	24	Cheyenne Stables LLC	Keith Desormeaux	$141,900	
14	Money'oncharlotte	22	George & Lori Hall	Kelly Breen	$60,070	
---	Danessa Deluxe	21	Gelfenstein Farm (Ivan Rodriguez Gelfenstein)	Antonio Sano	$44,250	
---	Paulassilverlining	20	Vincent S. Scuderi	Michelle Nevin	$250,000	
---	Scat Means Go	20	J. Kirk & Judy Robinson	Henry Dominguez	$44,000	
---	Sweet Success	20	G. Watts Humphrey Jr. & W.S. Farish	Rusty Arnold II	$27,900	
---	Callback	19	Spendthrift Farm LLC (B. Wayne Hughes)	Bob Baffert	$228,000	
---	Pangburn	14	Shortleaf Stable, Inc. (John Ed Anthony)	Kenny McPeek	$58,890	
---	Danette	12	Don't Tell My Wife Sables (Kirt Godbey & Rob Slack)	Keith Desormeaux	$112,250	
---	West Coast Belle	11	Gary & Mary West	Wayne Catalano	$176,676	
---	Sweet On Smokey	11	Alan R. Cook, Larry Pratt & Jacquie Dalton	Gregory Sacco	$16,500	
---	By the Moon	14	Jay Em Ess Stable (Samantha Siegel)	Michelle Nevin	$435,640	
15	Peace and War	10	Qatar Racing (Robert Levitt)	Olly Stevens	$241,610	
---	Seduire	10	Regis Racing (Nat Rea)	Jerry Hollendorfer	$230,600	
---	Conquest Harlanate	10	Conquest Stables, LLC (Ernie Semersky & Dory Newell)	Mark Caase	$226,100	
---	Devine Aida	10	Stronach Stables	Ramon Morales	$163,715	
Entrants for Kentucky Oaks in pink; "Also eligible" for Kentucky Oaks in green; Sidelined/Inactive/No longer under Oaks Consideration in gray; Winner of Kentucky Oaks in **bold**

== Prep season ==
Prep Season
Note: 1st=10 points; 2nd=4 points; 3rd=2 points; 4th=1 point
Race	Distance	Surface	Purse	Track	Date	1st	2nd	3rd	4th	Ref
Pocahontas	1 1/16 miles	Dirt	$150,000	Churchill Downs	Sep. 6, 2014	Cristina's Journey	Pangburn	Milehigh Butterfly	Loom	
Chandelier	1 1/16 miles	Dirt	$250,000	Santa Anita	Sep. 27, 2014	Angela Renee	Nakamoto	Danette	Increase	
Alcibiades	1 1/16 miles	Dirt	$400,000	Keeneland	Oct. 3, 2014	Peace and War	Top Decile	Paige	Milehigh Butterfly	
Frizette	1 mile	Dirt	$400,000	Belmont	Oct. 4, 2014	By the Moon	Wonder Gal	Feathered	Condo Commando	
Mazarine	1 1/16 miles	Synthetic	$200,000	Woodbine	Oct. 5, 2014	Conquest Harlanate	Brooklynsway	Del Cielo	Quidi Vidi	
Breeders' Cup Juvenile Fillies	1 1/16 miles	Dirt	$2,000,000	Santa Anita	Nov. 1, 2014	Take Charge Brandi	Top Decile	Wonder Gal	Feathered	
Delta Downs Princess	1 mile	Dirt	$500,000	Delta Downs	Nov. 22, 2014	Take Charge Brandi	Skipalute	Majestic Presence	Danessa Deluxe	
Demoiselle	1 1/8 miles	Dirt	$250,000	Aqueduct	Nov. 29, 2014	Condo Commando	Calamity Kate	Angela Renee	Quezon	
Golden Rod	1 1/16 miles	Dirt	$150,000	Churchill Downs	Nov. 29, 2014	West Coast Belle	No Fault of Mine	Heart's Song	I'm a Chatterbox	
Starlet	1 1/16 miles	Dirt	$350,000	Los Alamitos	Dec. 13, 2014	Take Charge Brandi	Feathered	Maybellene	Majestic Presence	
Santa Ynez	6 1/2 furlongs	Dirt	$125,000	Santa Anita	Jan. 3, 2015	Seduire	Callback	Xoxo	Lady Lake	
Busanda	1 mile 70 yards	Dirt	$100,000	Aqueduct	Jan. 16, 2015	Overprepared	Liberty Island	Diannestillworks	Sweet On Smokey	
Silverbulletday	1 mile 70 yards	Dirt	$125,000	Fair Grounds	Jan. 17, 2015	I'm A Chatterbox	Forever Unbridled	Money'soncharlotte	West Coast Belle	
Forward Gal	7 furlongs	Dirt	$200,000	Gulfstream	Jan. 24, 2015	Birdatthewire	Lassofthemohicans	Taylor S	Ekati's Phaeton	
Martha Washington	1 mile	Dirt	$75,000	Oaklawn	Jan. 31, 2015	Take Charge Brandi	Sarah Sis	Indian Annie	Sweet Corinna	
Las Virgenes	1 mile	Dirt	$300,000	Santa Anita	Jan. 31, 2015	Callback	Light The City	Achiever's Legacy	Majestic Presence	

== Championship Series ==
2015 Championship Series
First leg of series: 1st=50 points; 2nd=20 points; 3rd=10 points; 4th=5 points
Race	Distance	Surface	Purse	Track	Date	1st	2nd	3rd	4th	Ref
Busher	1 1/16 miles	Dirt	$100,000	Aqueduct	Feb. 21, 2015	Condo Commando	Paulassilverlining	Sweet On Smokey	Hold Me Down	
Davona Dale	1 1/16 miles	Dirt	$250,000	Gulfstream	Feb. 21, 2015	Ekati's Phaeton	Birdatthewire	Eskenformoney	Puca	
Rachel Alexandra	1 1/16 miles	Dirt	$200,000	Fair Grounds	Feb. 21, 2015	I'm A Chatterbox	Lovely Maria	Forever Unbridled	Angela Renee	
UAE Oaks	1 3/16 miles	Dirt	$250,000	Meydan	Feb. 26, 2015	Local Time	Shahrasal	Runner Runner	Good Place	
Santa Ysabel	1 1/16 miles	Dirt	$100,000	Santa Anita	Feb. 28, 2015	Stellar Wind	Light the City	Glory	Achiever's Legacy	
Honeybee	1 1/16 miles	Dirt	$150,000	Oaklawn	Mar. 7, 2015	Sarah Sis	Oceanwave	Pangburn	Purr	
Bourbonette Oaks	1 mile	Synthetic	$100,000	Turfway	Mar. 21, 2015	Don't Leave Me	Sweet Success	Sharla Rae	Harlan's Destiny	
Sunland Park Oaks	1 1/16 miles	Dirt	$200,000	Sunland	Mar. 22, 2015	Maybellene	Scat Means Go	Fancy and Flashy	Callback	
Second leg of series: 1st=100 points; 2nd=40 points; 3rd=20 points; 4th=10 points
Gulfstream Oaks	1 1/8 miles	Dirt	$300,000	Gulfstream	Mar. 28, 2015	Birdatthewire	Eskenformoney	Danessa Deluxe	Devine Aida	
Fair Grounds Oaks	1 1/16 miles	Dirt	$500,000	Fair Grounds	Mar. 28, 2015	I'm a Chatterbox	Shook Up	Forever Unbridled	Danette	
Santa Anita Oaks	1 1/16 miles	Dirt	$400,000	Santa Anita	Apr. 4, 2015	Stellar Wind	Luminance	Wild At Heart	Curlin's Fox	
Gazelle	1 mile	Dirt	$250,000	Aqueduct	Apr. 4, 2015	Condo Commando	Puca	Money'soncharlotte	Wonder Gal	
Ashland	1 1/16 miles	Synthetic	$500,000	Keeneland	Apr. 4, 2015	Lovely Maria	Angela Renee	Silverpocketsfull	Lassofthemohicans	
Fantasy	1 1/16 miles	Dirt	$400,000	Oaklawn	Apr. 4, 2015	Include Betty	Oceanwave	Achiever's Legacy	Pangburn	
Wild Card: 1st=10 points; 2nd=4 points; 3rd=2 points; 4th=1 points
Beaumont	7 furlongs	Dirt	$150,000	Keeneland	Apr. 12, 2015	Miss Ella	Divine Dawn	Fantastic Style	Zeven	
