= 2016 Road to the Kentucky Oaks =

The 2016 Road to the Kentucky Oaks was a points system by which three-year-old fillies qualified for the 2016 Kentucky Oaks. The point system replaced a previous qualifying system which was based on graded stakes earnings.

For the 2016 series, the points awarded to the top 4 finishers of the Breeders Cup Juvenile Fillies were doubled to a 20-8-4-2 basis. Otherwise the series was supposed to remain the same as 2015, with 31 total races. However, due to an outbreak of equine herpesvirus at Sunland Parks, the Sunland Park Oaks was not run, reducing the number of races to 30.

Songbird was the highest ranked filly with 190 points, earned by winning the Chandelier (10 points), Juvenile Fillies (20 points), Las Virgenes (10 points), Santa Ysabel (50 points) and Santa Anita Oaks (100 points). She would have been the heavy favorite for the Oaks but developed a fever and did not race.

Cathryn Sophia, the winner of the 2016 Oaks, qualified for the race with 80 points, earned by winning the Forward Gal Stakes (10 points) and Davona Dale Stakes (50 points) plus finishing 3rd in the Ashland (20 points).

== Standings ==
2016 point standings
Rank	Horse	Points	Owner	Trainer	Earnings	Ref
---	Songbird	190	Rick Porter	Jerry Hollendorfer	$2,720,000	
1	Terra Promessa	150	Stonestreet Stables	Steven Asmussen	$370,000	
2	Lewis Bay	130	Alpha Delta Stables	Chad Brown	$575,600	
3	Land Over Sea	128	Reddam Racing	Doug O'Neill	$604,500	
4	Go Maggie Go	100	Mike Tarp	Dale Romans	$399,400	
5	Weep No More	100	Ashbrook Farm	George Arnold	$395,000	
6	**Cathryn Sophia**	80	Cash Is King	John Servis	$1,079,720	
7	Mo d'Amour	70	King of Prussia Stable	Todd Pletcher	$196,100	
---	Polar River	50	Bukhtoyarov and Kappushev	Doug Watson	$700,000	
8	Mokat	50	J K Racing	Richard Baltas	$260,000	
9	Venus Valentine	50	Rosemont Farm	Thomas Amoss	$142,275	
---	Wonderment	50	Magdalena Racing	Kenneth McPeek	$58,660	
10	Rachel's Valentina	48	Stonestreet Stables	Todd Pletcher	$689,000	
11	Royal Obsession	45	Stonestreet Stable	Steven Asmussen	$78,000	
12	Dream Dance	44	Stoneway Farm	Neil Howard	$158,486	
---	Nickname	40	LNJ Foxwoods	Steve Asmussen	$469,400	
13	Paola Queen	40	Grupo 7C Racing	Gustavo Delgado	$389,000	
14	Taxable	40	Winchell Thoroughbreds	Steven Asmussen	$90,000	
---	Carina Mia	20	Three Chimneys Farm	William Mott	$799,320	
15	Dothraki Queen	20	Magdalena Racing	Kenneth McPeek	$447,806	
Entrants for Kentucky Oaks in pink; "Also eligible" for Kentucky Oaks in green; Sidelined/Inactive/No longer under Oaks Consideration in gray; Winner of Kentucky Oaks in bold

== Prep season ==
2016 Kentucky Oaks prep season
Race	Distance	Purse	Track	Date	1st	2nd	3rd	4th	Ref
Pocahontas	1 1/16 miles	$200,000	Churchill Downs	Sep 12, 2015	Dothraki Queen	Bold Quality	Dream Dance	Just Wicked	
Chandelier	1 1/16 miles	$300,000	Santa Anita	Sep 26, 2015	Songbird	Land Over Sea	Right There	Vleja Luna	
Alcibiades	1 1/16 miles	$400,000	Keeneland	Oct 2, 2015	Gomo	Dothraki Queen	Ma Can Do It	Put Da Blame On Me	
Frizette	1 mile	$400,000	Belmont	Oct 3, 2015	Nickname	Nemoralia	She's All Ready	Width	
Mazarine Stakes	1 1/16 miles	Can$150,000	Woodbine	Oct 4, 2015	Gamble's Ghost	Swoop and Strike	Garavogue Collen	Audacious Bear	
Breeders' Cup Juvenile Fillies	1 1/16 miles	$2,000,000	Keeneland	Oct 31, 2015	Songbird	Rachel's Valentina	Dothraki Queen	Nickname	
Delta Downs Princess	1 mile	$400,000	Delta Downs	Nov 21, 2015	Jet Black Magic	La Appassionata	Above Fashion	Shesthewinner	
Demoiselle	1 1/8 miles	$300,000	Aqueduct	Nov 28, 2015	Lewis Bay	Thrilled	Disco Rose	Flora Dora	
Golden Rod	1 1/16 miles	$200,000	Churchill Downs	Nov 28, 2015	Carina Mia	Stageplay	Dream Dance	Dothraki Queen	
Starlet	1 1/16 miles	$300,000	Los Alamitos	Dec 12, 2015	Street Fancy	Stays in Vegas	Sutton's Smile	Pretty N Cool	
Santa Ynez	6 1/2 furlongs	$125,000	Santa Anita	Jan 2, 2016	Forever Darling	Code Warrior	Pretty N Cool	Treasuring	
Silverbulletday	1 mile 70 yards	$125,000	Fair Grounds	Jan 16, 2016	Stageplay	Midnight on Oconee	Jet Black Magic	Lovable Lyss	
Busanda	1 mile 70 yards	$100,000	Aqueduct	Jan 30, 2016	Flora Dora	Scatoosh	Lost Raven	Dream to Reality	
Forward Gal	7 furlongs	$200,000	Gulfstream	Jan 30, 2016	Cathryn Sophia	Island Saint	Ballet Diva	Rontos Lily	
Las Virgenes	1 mile	$300,000	Santa Anita	Feb 6, 2016	Songbird	Land Over Sea	She's A Warrior	Meriosvo	
Martha Washington	1 mile	$100,000	Oaklawn	Feb 6, 2016	Marquee Miss	Nickname	Doradansa	Durango	
Note: 1st=10 points; 2nd=4 points; 3rd=2 points; 4th=1 point

== Championship Series ==
Kentucky Oaks 2016 Championship Series
First leg of series
Race	Distance	Purse	Track	Date	1st	2nd	3rd	4th	Ref
Rachel Alexandra	1 1/16 miles	$200,000	Fair Grounds	Feb 20, 2016	Venus Valentine	Midnight On Oconee	Shaken	Royal Obsession	
UAE Oaks	1 3/16 miles	$250,000	Meydan	Feb 25, 2016	Polar River				
Busher	1 1/16 miles	$125,000	Aqueduct	Feb 27, 2016	Mo d'Amour	Dreams to Reality	Katniss the Victor	Flora Dora	
Davona Dale	1 1/16 miles	$200,000	Gulfstream	Feb 27, 2016	Cathryn Sophia	Lewis Bay	Dearest	R Girls a Charmer	
Santa Ysabel	1 1/16 miles	$100,000	Santa Anita	Mar 5, 2016	Songbird	Land Over Sea	Mokat	Jade Princess	
Sunland Park Oaks	1 1/16 miles	$200,000	Sunland	Mar 20, 2016	race not run				
Honeybee	1 1/16 miles	$200,000	Oaklawn	Mar 12, 2016	Terra Promessa	Nickname	Cosmic Evolution	Dorodansa	
Bourbonette Oaks	1 mile	$100,000	Turfway	Apr 2, 2016	Wonderment	Inconclusive	Marquee Miss	Miss Meteor	
Note: 1st=50 points; 2nd=20 points; 3rd=10 points; 4th=5 points
Second leg of series
Race	Distance	Purse	Track	Date	1st	2nd	3rd	4th	Ref
Fair Grounds Oaks	1 1/16 miles	$500,000	Fair Grounds	Mar 26, 2016	Land Over Sea	Dream Dance	Adore	Northwest Tale	
Gulfstream Oaks	1 1/8 miles	$300,000	Gulfstream	Apr 2, 2017	Go Maggie Go	Paola Queen	Off the Tracks	Gomo	
Ashland	1 1/16 miles	$500,000	Keeneland	Apr 9, 2016	Weep No More	Rachel's Valentina	Cathryn Sophia	Carina Mia	
Santa Anita Oaks	1 1/16 miles	$400,000	Santa Anita	Apr 9, 2016	Songbird	Mokat	She's a Warrior	Forever Darling	
Gazelle	1 mile	$300,000	Aqueduct	Apr 9, 2016	Lewis Bay	Royal Obsession	Mo d'Amour	Dreams to Reality	
Fantasy	1 1/16 miles	$400,000	Oaklawn	Apr 9, 2016	Terra Promessa	Taxable	Ready to Confess	Cosmic Evolution	
Note: 1st=100 points; 2nd=40 points; 3rd=20 points; 4th=10 points
"Wild Card"
Race	Distance	Purse	Track	Date	1st	2nd	3rd	4th	Ref
Beaumont	7 furlongs	$150,000	Keeneland	Apr 17, 2016	Lightstream	Nickname	Kinsley Kisses	R Girls a Charmer	
Note: 1st=10 points; 2nd=4 points; 3rd=2 points; 4th=1 points
