= 2019 Road to the Kentucky Oaks =

The 2019 Road to the Kentucky Oaks is a points system by which Thoroughbred fillies will qualify for the 2019 Kentucky Oaks, to be held on May 3. The field for the Kentucky Oaks, the filly equivalent of the Kentucky Derby, is limited to fourteen horses, with up to four "also eligible" horses in case of a late withdrawal from the field. The 29 races in the Road to the Kentucky Oaks will be held from September 2018 (when the fillies are age two) through April 2019 (when they have turned three). The top four finishers in the specified races earn points, with the highest point values awarded in the major preparatory races held in late March or early April. Earnings in non-restricted stakes act as a tie breaker.

Fillies who instead wish to enter the Kentucky Derby have to earn the necessary points in the races on the Road to the Kentucky Derby: points earned on the Road to the Kentucky Oaks are not transferable. However, if a filly does earn qualifying points for the Derby by racing in open company, those points also count towards qualifying for the Oaks.

The Delta Princess Stakes, which was previously the 31st race in the series, had the 2017 running cancelled in the aftermath of Hurricane Harvey. It will not be part of the 2019 series.

The Santa Ysabel Stakes, which had previously been on the schedule, had the 2019 running cancelled in the aftermath of Santa Anita Park being closed as a result of an investigation into 22 equine fatalities at the track.

== Standings ==
The following table shows the points earned in the eligible races. Entries were taken on April 29. Bellafina was the leading points earner after winning the Santa Anita Oaks and went off as the heavy favorite. However, she was upset by Serengeti Empress, who had qualified by winning the Pocahontas and Rachel Alexandra Stakes.

Rank	Horse	Points	Owner	Trainer	Eligible Earnings (Note: Non-Restricted Stakes Earnings, used as a tie-breaker)	Ref
1	Bellafina	132	Kaleem Shah	Simon Callaghan	$1,060,000	
2	Champagne Anyone	113	Six Column Stables & Randy Bloch et al.	Ian Wilkes	$197,150	
bypassing	Always Shopping	110	Repole Stable	Todd Pletcher	$220,000	
3	Street Band	105	Larry & Cindy Jones, Ray Francis	Larry Jones	$248,000	
4	Lady Apple	100	Phoenix Thoroughbred III & KatieRich Stables	Steve Asmussen	$336,000	
5	Out for a Spin	100	Commonwealth Stable	Dallas Stewart	$300,000	
bypassing	Chasing Yesterday	80	Summer Wind Equine	Bob Baffert	$452,650	
6	Liora	71	Coffeepot Stables	Wayne Catalano	$246,280	
7	Restless Rider	62	Fern Circle Racing & Three Chimneys Farm	Kenny McPeek	$849,560	
**8**	**Serengeti Empress**	**60**	**Joel Politi**	**Tom Amoss**	**$313,270**	
9	Motion Emotion	60	Mark DeDomenico LLC	Thomas L. Van Berg	$140,000	
10	Jaywalk	55	Cash is King & Leonard Green	John Servis	$1,409,800	
11	Chocolate Kisses	51	Debby Oxley	Mark Casse	$152,000	
12	Jeltrin	51	ADR Racing Stable, LLC	Alexis Delgado	$128,720	
not nominated	Divine Image	50	Godolphin Racing	Charles Appleby	$380,372	
13	Positive Spirit	50	Michael Ryan	Rodolphe Brisset	$199,500	
bypassing	Espresso Shot	50	NY Final Furlong Racing Stable, Maspeth Stables and Parkland Thoroughbreds	Jorge Abreu	$156,875	
14	Flor De La Mar	40	Godolphin, LLC	Bob Baffert	$80,000	
15 (Note: Cookie Dough's connections paid a late nomination fee in April to make her eligible for the Kentucky Oaks)	Cookie Dough	40	Arindel	Stanley I. Gold	$63,950	
16	Dunbar Road	40	Peter M. Brant	Chad Brown	$49,500	
17	Eres Tu	24	Seltzer, Edward A. and Anderson, Beverly S.	Steve Asmussen	$66,000	
18	Brill	22	OXO Equine	Jerry Hollendorfer	$104,000	
19	Sweet Diane	22	Stallionaire Enterprises	Mike Stidham	$64,700	
20	Oxy Lady	21	Calumet Farm	Jack Sisterson	$154,166	
not nominated	Swift Rose	10	Godolphin	Saaed bin Suroor	$175,000	
21	Point of Honor	20	Eclipse Thoroughbred Partners and Stetson Racing, LLC	George Weaver	$72,375	
22	Naughty Joker	20	Ramsey, Kenneth L. and Sarah K	Wesley A. Ward	$58,250	
23	Bizwhacks	20	Reddam Racing LLC	Doug F. O'Neill	$57,000	
24	Orra Moor	20	StarLadies Racing	Todd A. Pletcher	$55,000	
25	Off Topic	20	Paul P. Pompa Jr.	Todd Pletcher	$36,000	
bypassing	Feedback	12	Klaravich Stables, Inc.	Chad Brown	$104,280	
bypassing	Mother Mother	11	G. Bolton, B. Hall, B. Lipman, M. Mathiesen & A. Molasky	Bob Baffert	$241,161	
bypassing	Fancy Dress Party	10	LNJ Foxwoods	Ben Colebrook	$90,000	
bypassing	Power Gal (JPN)	10	Gary Barber	Mark Casse	$75,800	
bypassing	Backflash	10	Winchell Thoroughbreds LLC (Ron Winchell)	Steve Asmussen	$40,400	
bypassing	Slewgoodtobetrue	10	Alesia, Sharon, Ciaglia Racing, LLC, ERJ Racing, LLC and Burns Racing, LLC	Peter Eurton	$28,000	
bypassing	Razeena	10	Sheikh Rashid Bin Humaid al Nuaimi	Doug Watson	$25,000	
bypassing	Proud Emma	10	Gem Inc., Tom Kagele & Steven Tartaglione	Peter Miller	$18,000	
bypassing	Vibrance	8	Eclipse Thoroughbred, Donna & Jim Daniell	Michael McCarthy	$240,000	
bypassing	Enaya Alrabb	8	Enaya Racing	Doug O'Neill	$100,000	
bypassing	Fun Finder	6	Magdalena Racing (Sherri McPeek)	Kenny McPeek	$20,300	
bypassing	Afleet Destiny	6	Uriah St. Lewis	Uriah St. Lewis	$62,000	

- Winner of Kentucky Oaks in **bold**
- Entrants for Kentucky Oaks in pink
- Did not qualify/Not nomininated/Injured/Bypassing the race in gray-->

== Race results ==
The dates for some races shown below are based on the placement in the racing calendar from 2017/2018. Similarly, the purses shown for upcoming races are based on the amounts from the previous year and will be updated when finalized.

=== Prep season ===
Kentucky Oaks prep season
Race	Distance	Purse	Track	Date	1st	2nd	3rd	4th	Ref
Pocahontas	1 1/16 miles	$200,000	Churchill Downs	Sep 15, 2018	Serengeti Empress	Splashy Empress	Lightscameraaction	My Wynter Rose	
Chandelier	1 1/16 miles	$300,000	Santa Anita	Sep 29, 2018	Bellafina	Vibrance	Brill	Der Lu	
Alcibiades	1 1/16 miles	$400,000	Keeneland	Oct 5, 2018	Restless Rider	Reflect	Meadow Dance	Chocolate Kisses	
Frizette	1 mile	$400,000	Belmont	Oct 7, 2018	Jaywalk	Brucia La Terra	Cassies Dreamer	Covfefe	
Breeders' Cup Juvenile Fillies	1 1/16 miles	$2,000,000	Churchill Downs	Nov 3, 2018	Jaywalk	Restless Rider	Vibrance	Bellafina	
Golden Rod	1 1/16 miles	$200,000	Churchill Downs	Nov 24, 2018	Liora	Restless Rider	High Regard	Champagne Anyone	
Demoiselle	1 1/8 miles	$250,000	Aqueduct	Dec 1, 2018	Positive Spirit	Afleet Destiny	Filly Joel	Molto Bella	
Starlet	1 1/16 miles	$300,000	Los Alamitos	Dec 8, 2018	Chasing Yesterday	Enaya Alrabb	Mother Mother	Oxy Lady	
Santa Ynez	6 1/2 furlongs	$125,000	Santa Anita	Jan 6, 2019	Bellafina	Mother Mother	Tomlin	Reflect	
Silverbulletday	1 mile 70 yards	$150,000	Fair Grounds	Jan 19, 2019	Needs Supervision	Eres Tu	Grandaria	Liora	
Forward Gal	7 furlongs	$200,000	Gulfstream	Feb 2, 2019	Feedback	Bye Bye J	Champagne Anyone	Jeltrin	
Martha Washington	1 mile	$125,000	Oaklawn	Feb 2, 2019	Power Gal	Marathon Queen	Taylor's Spirit	Sunset Wish	
Busanda	1 mile 70 yards	$100,000	Aqueduct	Feb 3, 2019	Always Shopping	Filly Joel	Afleet Destiny	Miss Marilyn	
Las Virgenes	1 mile	$300,000	Santa Anita	Feb 9, 2019	Bellafina	Enaya Alrabb	Calf Moon Bay	Mother Mother	
Suncoast Stakes	1 mile 40 yards	$150,000	Tampa Bay	Feb 9, 2019	Point of Honor	Lady Kate	Sweet Diane	Winning Envelope	
Note: 1st=10 points; 2nd=4 points; 3rd=2 points; 4th=1 point, except the Juvenile Fillies, for which the points are doubled

=== Championship Series ===
Kentucky Oaks Championship Series
First leg of series
Race	Distance	Purse	Track	Date	1st	2nd	3rd	4th	Ref
Rachel Alexandra	1 1/16 miles	$200,000	Fair Grounds	Feb 16, 2019	Serengeti Empress	Liora	Eres Tu	Street Band	
UAE Oaks	1,900 metres (~1 3/16 miles)	$250,000	Meydan	Feb 21, 2019	Divine Image	Swift Rose	Razeena	Habah	
Davona Dale	1 1/16 miles	$200,000	Gulfstream	Mar 2, 2019	Jeltrin	Cookie Dough	Champagne Anyone	Jaywalk	
Busher	1 1/16 miles	$125,000	Aqueduct	Mar 9, 2019	Espresso Shot	Oxy Lady	Orra Moor	Please Flatter Me	
Honeybee	1 1/16 miles	$200,000	Oaklawn	Mar 9, 2019	Chocolate Kisses	Motion Emotion	Bizwhacks	Sunset Wish	
Sunland Park Oaks	1 1/16 miles	$200,000	Sunland	Mar 24, 2019	Chasing Yesterday	K P Slickem	Backflash	Figure	
Note: 1st=50 points; 2nd=20 points; 3rd=10 points; 4th=5 points
Second leg of series
Race	Distance	Purse	Track	Date	1st	2nd	3rd	4th	Ref
Fair Grounds Oaks	1 1/16 miles	$400,000	Fair Grounds	Mar 23, 2019	Street Band	Liora	Sweet Diane	Eres Tu	
Gulfstream Oaks	1 1/16 miles	$250,000	Gulfstream	Mar 30, 2019	Champagne Anyone	Dunbar Road	Cookie Dough	Point of Honor	
Ashland	1 1/16 miles	$500,000	Keeneland	Apr 6, 2019	Out for a Spin	Restless Rider	Jaywalk	Bizwhacks	
Santa Anita Oaks	1 1/16 miles	$400,000	Santa Anita	Apr 6, 2019	Bellafina	Flor de La Mar	Chasing Yesterday	Slewgoodtobetrue	
Gazelle	1 1/8 miles	$300,000	Aqueduct	Apr 6, 2019	Always Shopping	Positive Spirit	Off Topic	Proud Emma	
Fantasy	1 1/16 miles	$400,000	Oaklawn	Apr 12, 2019	Lady Apple	Motion Emotion	Brill	Orra Moor	
Note: 1st=100 points; 2nd=40 points; 3rd=20 points; 4th=10 points
"Wild Card"
Race	Distance	Purse	Track	Date	1st	2nd	3rd	4th	Ref
Bourbonette Oaks	1 mile	$100,000	Turfway	Mar 9, 2019	Naughty Joker	Fun Finder	New Roo	Diva Day	
Beaumont	7 furlongs	$150,000	Keeneland	Apr 7, 2019	Fancy Dress Party	Mother Mother	Feedback	Another Time	
Bourbonette Oaks: 1st=20 points; 2nd=8 points; 3rd=4 points; 4th=2 points Beaumont Stakes: 1st=10 points; 2nd=4 points; 3rd=2 points; 4th=1 points

== See also ==
- 2019 Road to the Kentucky Derby
