= 2021 Road to the Kentucky Oaks =

The 2021 Road to the Kentucky Oaks is a points system by which Thoroughbred fillies qualified for the 2021 Kentucky Oaks held on April 30. The field for the Kentucky Oaks, the filly equivalent of the Kentucky Derby, is limited to fourteen horses, with up to four "also eligible" horses in case of a late withdrawal from the field. The 30 races in the Road to the Kentucky Oaks were held from September 2020 (when the fillies were age two) through April 2021 (when they had turned three). The top four finishers in the specified races earn points, with the highest point values awarded in the major preparatory races held in late March and early April. Earnings in non-restricted stakes act as a tie breaker.

Fillies who instead wish to enter the Kentucky Derby have to earn the necessary points in the races on the Road to the Kentucky Derby: points earned on the Road to the Kentucky Oaks are not transferable. However, if a filly does earn qualifying points for the Derby by racing in open company, those points also count towards qualifying for the Oaks.

The 2020 Road to the Kentucky Oaks suffered major disruptions due to the COVID-19 pandemic, which led to the postponement of the 2020 Oaks itself to September. For 2021, the Road to the Kentucky Oaks instead reverted to schedule for the 2019 Road to the Kentucky Oaks, except as follows:

- the Cincinnati Trophy, added as part of the 2020 Road, was retained for 2021
- Points for the Bourbonette Oaks were increased from 20 for first place to 50
- the Sunland Park Oaks was not held because of the cancellation of the Sunland Park race meeting due to the COVID-19 pandemic

For the first time, points will not be awarded to horses that have been administered furosemide (Lasix) on race day.

== Standings ==
The following table shows the points earned in the eligible races. Entries were taken on April 27.

Rank	Horse	Points	Owner	Trainer	Eligible Earnings (Note: Non-Restricted Stakes Earnings, used as a tie-breaker)	Ref
1	Search Results	150	Klaravich Stables	Chad Brown	$275,000	
2	Travel Column	132	OXO Equine	Brad Cox	$462,040	
3	Crazy Beautiful	128	Phoenix Thoroughbred	Kenneth McPeek	$366,165	
4	Pauline's Pearl	120	Stonestreet Stable	Steve Asmussen	$301,400	
5	Malathaat	110	Shadwell Stable	Todd Pletcher	$377,500	
	Soothsay	100	Claiborne Farm, Perry & Ramona Bass & Adele Dilschneider	Richard Mandella	$240,000	
6	Clairiere	94	Stonestreet Stable	Steve Asmussen	$301,400	
	Beautiful Gift	90	Baomo Corp	Bob Baffert	$140,000	
7	Will's Secret	80	Willis Horton Racing	Dallas Stewart	$340,000	
	Wholebodemeister	52	Sahara Farm	Doug Watson	$128,322	
	Mnasek	50	Al Rashid Stables	Doug Watson	$100,000	
	Adventuring	50	Godolphin	Brad Cox	$88,350	
8	Millefeuille	44	Juddmonte Farms	Bill Mott	$71,200	
9	Moraz	42	Don Alberto Stable	Michael McCarthy	$92,000	
10	Ava's Grace	40	Cypress Creek Equine	Robertino Diodoro	$138,000	
11	Pass the Champagne	40	R.A. Hill Stable, Black Type Thoroughbreds, Rock Ridge Racing, BlackRidge Stables and James Brown	George Weaver	$80,000	
12	Maracuja (Note: Maracuja's connections paid a late nomination fee)	40	Beach Haven Thoroughbreds	Rob Atras	$50,000	
	The Grass is Blue	30	Louis Lazzinnaro	Chad Brown	$110,278	
13	Competitive Speed (Note: A late nomination fee was paid for Competitive Speed)	30	John Minchello	Javier Gonzalvez	$85,635	
	Kalypso	28	David Remsen, Rockingham Ranch & Chad Littlefield	Bob Baffert	$280,000	
14	Coach	26	Kueber Racing	Brad Cox	$186,640	
	Vequist	24	Gary Barber, Wachtel Stable & Swilson Stable	Robert Reid Jr.	$1,229,500	
	Souper Sensational	24	Live Oaks Plantation	Mark Casse	$118,484	
	Moon Swag	22	Brad King, Jim Cone, Scott Bryant, Stan & Suzanne Kirby	Brendan Walsh	$98,000	
	Miss Brazil	20	Team D & Madaket Stable	Tony Dutrow	$105,000	
	Army Wife	20	Three Diamonds Farm	Mike Maker	$30,000	
	Nayefah	20	Sheikh Ahmed bin Rashid Al Maktoum	Nicholas Bachalard	$28,750	
15	Spritz (Note: A late nomination fee was paid for Spritz)	20	SF Racing	Rodolphe Brisset	$28,500	
	Dayoutoftheoffice	18	Timothy Hamm & Siena Farm	Timothy Hamm	$532,500	

- Entrants for Kentucky Oaks in pink
- Did not qualify/Not nomininated/Injured/Bypassing the race in gray-->

== Race results ==
=== Prep season ===
Kentucky Oaks prep season
Race	Distance	Purse	Track	Date	1st	2nd	3rd	4th	Ref
Pocahontas	1 mile	$200,000	Churchill Downs	Sep 3, 2020	Girl Daddy	Crazy Beautiful	Alexandria	Xtrema	
Chandelier	1 1/16 miles	$200,000	Santa Anita	Sep 26, 2020	Princess Noor	Varda	Miss Costa Rica	Illumination	
Alcibiades	1 1/16 miles	$350,000	Keeneland	Oct 2, 2020	Simply Ravishing	Crazy Beautiful	Travel Column	Thoughtfully	
Frizette	1 mile	$250,000	Belmont	Oct 10, 2020	Dayoutoftheoffice	Vequist	Cilla	Joy's Rocket	
Breeders' Cup Juvenile Fillies	1 1/16 miles	$2,000,000	Churchill Downs	Nov 6, 2020	Vequist	Dayoutoftheoffice	Girl Daddy	Simply Ravishing	
Golden Rod	1 1/16 miles	$200,000	Churchill Downs	Nov 28, 2020	Travel Column	Clairiere	Coach	Simply Ravishing	
Demoiselle	1 1/8 miles	$150,000	Aqueduct	Dec 5, 2020	Malathaat	Millefeuille	Malibu Curl	Cafe Society	
Starlet	1 1/16 miles	$300,000	Los Alamitos	Dec 5, 2020	Varda	Kalypso	Nasreddine	Astute	
Santa Ynez	7 furlongs	$200,000	Santa Anita	Jan 3, 2021	Kalypso	Frosteira	Brilliant Cut	Queengol	
Silverbulletday	1 mile 70 yards	$150,000	Fair Grounds	Jan 16, 2021	Charlie's Penny	Souper Sensational	Moon Swag	Sun Path	
Busanda	1 1/8 miles	$100,000	Aqueduct	Jan 24, 2021	The Grass Is Blue	Coffee Bar	Diamond Ore	Traffic Lane	
Forward Gal	7 furlongs	$100,000	Gulfstream	Jan 30, 2021	Zaajel	Lady Traveler	Wholebodemeister	Dial to Win	
Martha Washington	1 mile	$200,000	Oaklawn	Jan 30, 2021	Will's Secret	Coach	Joy's Rocket	Sylvia Q	
Suncoast Stakes	1 mile 40 yards	$150,000	Tampa Bay	Feb 6, 2021	Curlin's Catch	Be Sneaky	Il Malocchio	Special Princess	
Las Virgenes	1 mile	$200,000	Santa Anita	Feb 6, 2021	Moonlight d'Oro	Kalypso	Moraz	Brilliant Cut	
Cincinnati Trophy	6 1/2 furlongs	$65,000	Turfway Park	Feb 26, 2021	Wait for Nairobi	Phantom Vision	Igloo	Speeding	
Note: 1st=10 points; 2nd=4 points; 3rd=2 points; 4th=1 point, except the Juvenile Fillies, for which the points are doubled

=== Championship Series ===
Kentucky Oaks Championship Series
First leg of series
Race	Distance	Purse	Track	Date	1st	2nd	3rd	4th	Ref
Rachel Alexandra	1 1/16 miles	$300,000	Fair Grounds	Feb 13, 2021	Clairiere	Travel Column	Moon Swag	Littlestitious	
UAE Oaks	1,900 metres (~1 3/16 miles)	$250,000	Meydan	Feb 18, 2021	Mnasek	Nayefah	Last Sunset	Al Maroom	
Davona Dale	1 mile	$200,000	Gulfstream	Feb 27, 2021	Wholebodemeister	Crazy Beautiful	Competitive Speed	Pens Street	
Busher	1 mile	$250,000	Aqueduct	March 6, 2021	Search Results	Miss Brazil	The Grass Is Blue	Laobanonaprayer	
Honeybee	1 1/16 miles	$300,000	Oaklawn	Mar 6, 2021	Will's Secret	Pauline's Pearl	Sun Path	Oliviaofthedesert	
Santa Ysabel	1 1/16 miles	$100,000	Santa Anita	Mar 7, 2021	Beautiful Gift	Moraz	Kalypso	Heels Up	
Sunland Park Oaks	align=center |cancelled (Note: Due to the COVID-19 pandemic in the United States the New Mexico racing regulator cancelled the Sunland Park meeting for 2021)								
Bourbonette Oaks	1 mile (Note: All weather track)	$150,000	Turfway	Mar 27, 2021	Adventuring	Spritz	Candace	Oliviaofthedesert	
Note: 1st=50 points; 2nd=20 points; 3rd=10 points; 4th=5 points
Second leg of series
Race	Distance	Purse	Track	Date	1st	2nd	3rd	4th	Ref
Fair Grounds Oaks	1 1/16 miles	$400,000	Fair Grounds	Mar 20, 2021	Travel Column	Clairiere	Souper Sensational	Obligatory	
Gulfstream Park Oaks	1 1/16 miles	$200,000	Gulfstream	Mar 27, 2021	Crazy Beautiful	Millefeuille	Competitive Speed	Con Lima	
Ashland	1 1/16 miles	$400,000	Keeneland	Apr 3, 2021	Malathaat	Pass the Champagne	Will's Secret	Moon Swag	
Santa Anita Oaks	1 1/16 miles	$400,000	Santa Anita	Apr 3, 2021	Soothsay	Beautiful Gift	Moraz	Javanica	
Gazelle	1 1/8 miles	$250,000	Aqueduct	Apr 3, 2021	Search Results	Maracuja	Army Wife	The Grass Is Blue	
Fantasy	1 1/16 miles	$400,000	Oaklawn	Apr 3, 2021	Pauline's Pearl	Ava's Grace	Coach	Take Charge Lorin	
Note: 1st=100 points; 2nd=40 points; 3rd=20 points; 4th=10 points
"Wild Card"
Race	Distance	Purse	Track	Date	1st	2nd	3rd	4th	Ref
Beaumont	7 furlongs	$150,000	Keeneland	Apr 2, 2021	Twenty Carat	Slumber Party	Amalfi Princess	Lady Traveler	
1st=10 points; 2nd=4 points; 3rd=2 points; 4th=1 points

== See also ==
- 2021 Road to the Kentucky Derby
