= Hey Negrita =

Hey Negrita may refer to:

- Hey Negrita (band)
- "Hey Negrita" (song), a song by The Rolling Stones that appeared on their 1976 album Black and Blue
- Hey Negrita, horse in 2018 Road to the Kentucky Oaks
