= Gerard Melancon =

American jockey (born 1967)

Personal information
- Born: May 10, 1967 (age 59) Rayne, Louisiana
- Occupation: Jockey

Horse racing career
- Sport: Horse racing
- Career wins: 5,000 (as at 2021-08-21)

Major racing wins
- Colonel E.R. Bradley Handicap (1996, 2004); Count Fleet Sprint Handicap (2001); Hanshin Cup Handicap (2002); Vosburgh Stakes (2002); WinStar Distaff Handicap (2003); Super Derby (2004); Fair Grounds Handicap (2011); Delta Downs Jackpot Stakes (2011, 2013); Lukas Classic Stakes (2019)

Significant horses
- Bonapaw, Fantasticat, Rise Up, Sabrecat, Skate Away, Zarb's Dahar

Gerard Melancon (born May 10, 1967 in Rayne, Louisiana) is an American jockey in Thoroughbred horse racing. On June 9, 2016, he won the 4,500th race of his career at Evangeline Downs in Opelousas, Louisiana.

Chart (2001–present)	Peak position
National Earnings List for Jockeys 2001	84
National Earnings List for Jockeys 2002	41
National Earnings List for Jockeys 2003	42
National Earnings List for Jockeys 2004	40
National Earnings List for Jockeys 2005	66
National Earnings List for Jockeys 2007	65
National Earnings List for Jockeys 2008	58
National Earnings List for Jockeys 2009	60
National Earnings List for Jockeys 2010	79
National Earnings List for Jockeys 2011	52
National Earnings List for Jockeys 2013	43
National Earnings List for Jockeys 2014	71
National Earnings List for Jockeys 2015	73
