= Delta Jackpot Stakes =

- Class: Grade III
- Location: Delta Downs; Vinton, Louisiana
- Inaugurated: 2002
- Race type: Thoroughbred – Flat racing
- Website: deltadowns.com

Race information
- Distance: 1 1/16 miles (8.5 Furlongs)
- Surface: Dirt
- Track: left-handed
- Qualification: Two-year-olds
- Weight: Assigned
- Purse: $1,000,000

The Delta Jackpot Stakes was an American Thoroughbred horse race run annually at Delta Downs in Vinton, Louisiana between 2002 and 2017. A Grade III stakes open to two-year-old horses, it was raced in November over a distance of 1 1/16 miles (8.5 Furlongs) on dirt.

== History ==
The inaugural running of the Delta Jackpot took place in 2002. Run over a distance of one mile (1.6 km), it carried a purse of $500,000. For the following year, the race was lengthened to 1 1/16 miles and the purse was increased to $1 million to make it the second-richest race for two-year-olds in North America behind only the Breeders' Cup Juvenile.

The 2005 running of the Delta Jackpot Stakes was cancelled due to Hurricane Rita. The 2017 running was cancelled due to Hurricane Harvey. Delta Downs management discontinued the race after an agreement regarding the race's future could not be reached.

Sponsored by Boyd Gaming, the Delta Jackpot Stakes was run as a graded race for the first time in 2006. It was run on the same day as the Delta Princess Stakes for two-year-old fillies.

The 2007 running of the Delta Jackpot Stakes finished in the race's first dead heat, with Z Humor and Turf War stopping the timer in 1:45.43. As a result of the tie, both horses split $800,000 in purse money.

Due to the 2008 economic downturn, the purse was reduced in the 2008 and 2009 runnings from $1,000,0000 to $750,000. The purse was increased back to $1,000,0000 in 2010.

== Records ==
Speed record:

- 1:44.71 – Rise Up (2013)

Most wins by a jockey:

- 2 – Gerard Melancon
- 2 – Kent Desormeaux

Most wins by a trainer:

- No trainer has won this race more than once.

Most wins by an owner:

- No owner has won this race more than once.

== Winners ==
| Year | Winner | Jockey | Trainer | Owner | Time |
|---|---|---|---|---|---|
| 2017 | Race Not Ran | | | | |
| 2016 | Gunnevera | Javier Castellano | Antonio Sano | Peacock Racing | 1:45.15 |
| 2015 | Exaggerator | Kent Desormeaux | J. Keith Desormeaux | Big Chief Racing | 1:46.48 |
| 2014 | Ocho Ocho Ocho | Mike E. Smith | James M. Cassidy | DP Racing | 1:45.47 |
| 2013 | Rise Up | Gerard Melancon | Thomas Amoss | Van Doren, Paul and Andrena | 1:44.71 |
| 2012 | Goldencents | Kevin Krigger | Doug F. O'Neill | W.C. Racing/Kenney/RAP Racing | 1:44.89 |
| 2011 | Sabercat | Gerard Melancon | Steve Asmussen | Winchell Thoroughbreds | 1:46.62 |
| 2010 | Gourmet Dinner | Sebastian Madrid | Steve Standridge | Our Sugar Bear Stable | 1:45.23 |
| 2009 | Rule | John Velazquez | Todd Pletcher | WinStar Farm | 1:45.63 |
| 2008 | Big Drama | Eibar Coa | David Fawkes | Harold L. Queen | 1:44.72 |
| 2007 | Z Humor (DH) | Garrett Gomez | William I. Mott | Zayat Stables | 1:45.43 |
| 2007 | Turf War (DH) | Calvin Borel | Mark Casse | Woodford Racing LLC | 1:45.43 |
| 2006 | Birdbirdistheword | Robby Albarado | Kenneth McPeek | Raymond H. Cottrell, Sr. | 1:45.42 |
| 2005 | Race Not Ran | | | | |
| 2004 | Texcess | Victor Espinoza | Paul Aguirre | Omar Aldabbagh/P. Aguirre | 1:48.20 |
| 2003 | Mr Jester | Roman Chapa | Steve Wren | Karen J. Biggs | 1:45.34 |
| 2002 | Outta Here | Kent Desormeaux | Bill Currin | B. Currin / Al Eisman | 1:37.77 |

DH – Dead Heat

== See also ==
- Road to the Kentucky Derby
