= Take Charge Brandi =

American-bred Thoroughbred racehorse

- Sire: Giant's Causeway
- Grandsire: Storm Cat
- Dam: Charming
- Damsire: Seeking The Gold
- Sex: Filly
- Foaled: 7 February 2012
- Country: United States
- Colour: Chestnut
- Breeder: Charming Syndicate
- Owner: Willis D. Horton
- Trainer: D. Wayne Lukas
- Record: 11: 5–1–0
- Earnings: $1,682,126

Major wins
- Breeders' Cup Juvenile Fillies (2014); Delta Princess Stakes (2014); Starlet Stakes (2014); Martha Washington Stakes (2015)

Awards
- American Champion Two-Year-Old Filly (2014)

Take Charge Brandi (foaled 7 February 2012) is an American Thoroughbred racehorse. A descendant of the outstanding broodmare Take Charge Lady, she was one of the leading juvenile fillies in North America in 2014. After winning only one of her first five races she sprang a 66/1 upset when winning the Breeders' Cup Juvenile Fillies and followed up with victories in the Delta Princess Stakes and the Grade I Starlet Stakes. After winning a listed stakes race early in 2015, a bone chip in her knee, discovered prior to her anticipated start in the Rebel Stakes, took her out of contention for the Kentucky Oaks. Returning to the track in August 2015, following two lackluster performances, she was retired in September, 2015.

== Background ==
Take Charge Brandi is a chestnut filly with a broad white blaze bred in Kentucky by the Charming Syndicate. She was sired by Giant's Causeway who won six Group One races in Europe and was named Cartier Horse of the Year in 2000. His other progeny include Ghanaati, Footstepsinthesand, Shamardal, Rite of Passage and Aragorn. He was Leading sire in North America in 2009, 2010 and 2012. Take Charge Brandi's dam Charming, was the first foal of Take Charge Lady who has also produced the Grade I winners Take Charge Indy and Will Take Charge. Trained by Todd Pletcher Charming won on her debut at Keeneland, but sustained a serious injury at Monmouth Park in July and was retired from racing. Take Charge Brandi is her second foal.

As a yearling Take Charge Brandi was consigned to the Keeneland September sale, where she was bought for $435,000 by Willis Horton. The filly was sent into training with the veteran D. Wayne Lukas.

== Racing career ==
=== 2014: two-year-old season ===
Take Charge Brandi made her racecourse debut in a maiden race over four and a half furlongs at Churchill Downs on June 22. Ridden by Corey Lanerie, she took the lead soon after the start and drew away in the closing stages to win "very easily" by two and a half lengths from Conquest Archangel. Four weeks later, the filly was moved up in class and distance for the Grade III Schuylerville Stakes over six furlongs at Saratoga Race Course and finished second to odds-on favorite Fashion Alert. Take Charge Brandi was unplaced in her next three races. She finished fifth to Cavorting in the Adirondack Stakes at Saratoga, fifth again behind Cristina's Journey in the Pocahontas Stakes at Churchill Downs, and eighth behind the British-trained Peace And War in the Grade I Alcibiades Stakes at Keeneland.

Take Charge Brandi was then sent to California to contest the thirty-first running of the Breeders' Cup Juvenile Fillies over one and one sixteenth of a mile at Santa Anita Park on November 1. Ridden for the first time by Victor Espinoza, she started the 66/1 outsider of the twelve-runner field. Chandelier Stakes winner Angela Renee started as the favorite ahead of Conquest Eclipse, Puca, Cristina's Journey, and Top Decile. Espinoza sent his mount into the lead soon after the start and set the pace from By The Moon, Feathered, and Hennythelovepenny. She maintained her advantage into the straight with Feathered, Wonder Gal, and Danette as her closest pursuers and many of the more fancied fillies beginning to struggle. Espinoza never used his whip as Take Charge Brandi kept on in the closing stages to win by half a length from the fast-finishing Top Decile, with Wonder Gal, Feathered, and Danette close behind in third, fourth, and fifth. After the race, Espinoza said, "Wayne just told me to let her run and I did that. I hit her once and she didn't seem to like it, so I didn't hit her anymore and I just let her do her thing." Lukas commented, "I thought she had a great week, and today I thought we could be a factor, not that we would win it, but that we would do very well. This is the most exciting one yet.”

Three weeks after her Breeders' Cup, Take Charge Brandi started the 2.2/1 favorite under top weight of 122 pounds for the Grade III Delta Princess Stakes at Delta Downs. Ridden for the first time by Paco Lopez, the favorite tracked early leader Vivian Da Bling before gaining the advantage on the final turn. In the stretch, she held off the challenge of Skipalute to win by one and a half lengths, with Majestic Presence a length away in third. Lukas said that the winner "showed her class today because I didn't think she handled the track very well". On December 13, she returned to California to contest the Grade I Starlet Stakes, held for the first time at Los Alamitos Race Course. With Espinoza back in the irons, she went off as the favorite. Leading wire to wire but strongly challenged in the stretch, she defeated the Todd Pletcher-trained Feathered by half a length as well as third-place finisher Maybellene and familiar rival Majestic Presence in fourth. Espinoza said, "...It seemed like when she felt them coming, she dug in and wasn't going to let them by." Lukas explained that the dramatic improvement from her lackluster summer performances was because "we decided just to leave her alone and let her run her race."

=== 2015: three-year-old season ===
Take Charge Brandi made her three-year-old debut with a close victory over Sarah Sis in Oaklawn Park's Martha Washington Stakes. It was then decided by Take Charge Brandi's connections to try running her against males in the March 14th Rebel Stakes in the hopes of possibly competing in the Kentucky Derby instead of the Kentucky Oaks, but five days before the Rebel she was discovered to have a non-displaced bone chip in her right knee. The injury was expected to sideline the horse for two months, taking her out of Derby and Oaks contention.

The filly eventually returned in the Test Stakes at Saratoga Race Course on August 8. Ridden by Luis Saez, she led the field into the straight before tiring in the closing stages and was eased down to finish last of the ten runners behind Cavorting. Following the September 19 Cotillion Stakes, where she was eased and did not finish, her connections announced her retirement on September 28.

On November 3, Take Charge Brandi was sold for $6 million at the Keeneland breeding stock sale to Hill 'n' Dale Farm.

== Pedigree ==
Pedigree of Take Charge Brandi (USA), chestnut filly, 2012
Sire Giant's Causeway (USA) 1997	Storm Cat (USA); 1983	Storm Bird (CAN)	Northern Dancer (CAN)
Sire Giant's Causeway (USA) 1997	Storm Cat (USA); 1983	Storm Bird (CAN)	South Ocean (CAN)
Sire Giant's Causeway (USA) 1997	Storm Cat (USA); 1983	Terlingua (USA)	Secretariat (USA)
Sire Giant's Causeway (USA) 1997	Storm Cat (USA); 1983	Terlingua (USA)	Crimson Saint (USA)
Sire Giant's Causeway (USA) 1997	Mariah's Storm (USA); 1991	Rahy (USA)	Blushing Groom (FRA)
Sire Giant's Causeway (USA) 1997	Mariah's Storm (USA); 1991	Rahy (USA)	Glorious Song (CAN)
Sire Giant's Causeway (USA) 1997	Mariah's Storm (USA); 1991	Immense (USA)	Roberto (USA)
Sire Giant's Causeway (USA) 1997	Mariah's Storm (USA); 1991	Immense (USA)	Imsodear (USA)
Dam Charming (USA) 2005	Seeking The Gold (USA); 1985	Mr. Prospector (USA)	Raise a Native (USA)
Dam Charming (USA) 2005	Seeking The Gold (USA); 1985	Mr. Prospector (USA)	Gold Digger (USA)
Dam Charming (USA) 2005	Seeking The Gold (USA); 1985	Con Game (USA)	Buckpasser (USA)
Dam Charming (USA) 2005	Seeking The Gold (USA); 1985	Con Game (USA)	Broadway (USA)
Dam Charming (USA) 2005	Take Charge Lady (USA); 1999	Dehere (USA)	Deputy Minister (CAN)
Dam Charming (USA) 2005	Take Charge Lady (USA); 1999	Dehere (USA)	Sister Dot (USA)
Dam Charming (USA) 2005	Take Charge Lady (USA); 1999	Felicita (USA)	Rubiano (USA)
Dam Charming (USA) 2005	Take Charge Lady (USA); 1999	Felicita (USA)	Grand Bonheur (USA)
