= Delta Princess Stakes =

- Class: discontinued
- Location: Delta Downs; Vinton, Louisiana, United States
- Inaugurated: 2002
- Race type: Thoroughbred - Flat racing
- Website: www.deltadowns.com

Race information
- Distance: 1 mile (8 furlongs)
- Surface: Dirt
- Track: left-handed
- Qualification: Two-year-old fillies
- Weight: Assigned
- Purse: $400,000

The Delta Princess Stakes was an American Thoroughbred horse race run annually at Delta Downs in Vinton, Louisiana. A Grade III event for the first time in 2008, it is raced in November. It is open to two-year-old fillies. It is contested in November over a distance of 1 mile (8 Furlongs) on dirt.

The race is held on the same day as the Delta Downs Jackpot Stakes for two-year-old males.

The 2005 edition of the Delta Princess Stakes was cancelled due to Hurricane Katrina. The 2017 edition was cancelled in the aftermath of Hurricane Harvey.

The event was last run in 2016.

== Records ==
Speed record:

- 1:37.98 - Shane's Girlfriend (2016)

Most wins by a jockey:

- 2 - Paco Lopez (2012, 2014)
- 2 - Shaun Bridgmohan (2008, 2010)

Most wins by a trainer:

- 2 - Steve Asmussen (2004, 2008)

Most wins by an owner:

- No owner has won this race more than once.

== Winners ==
Year	Winner	Jockey	Trainer	Owner	Time
2017	cancelled				
2016	Shane's Girlfriend	Flavien Prat	Doug O'Neill	Erik Johnson & WC Racing	1:37.98
2015	Jet Black Magic	Roberto Morales	W. Bret Calhoun	Carl R. Moore Management	1:42.14
2014	Take Charge Brandi	Paco Lopez	D. Wayne Lukas	Willis D. Horton	1:39.60
2013	Tepin	Miguel Mena	Mark E. Casse	Robert E. Masterson	1:38.95
2012	Rose to Gold	Paco Lopez	Sal Santoro	Amaya/Centofanti	1:39.38
2011	Now I Know	Perry Compton	Don Von Hemel	Von Hemel/Stockseth	1:39.79
2010	Bouquet Booth	Shaun Bridgmohan	Steve Margolis	Right Time Racing	1:40.59
2009	Quiet Temper	Robby Albarado	Dale Romans	Mark Stanley	1:40.05
2008	Four Gifts	Shaun Bridgmohan	Steve Asmussen	Bill & Corinne Heiligbrodt	1:38.71
2007	By The Light	Rafael Bejarano	Rick Dutrow	Jay Em Ess Stable	1:40.21
2006	Miss Atlantic City	Kent Desormeaux	Keith Desormeaux	Peter L. Cantrell	1:40.20
2005	no race				
2004	Punch Appeal	Donnie Meche	Steve Asmussen	Heiligbrodt Stable et al.	1:40.42
2003	Salty Romance	Mike E. Smith	Patrick Biancone	Flying Zee Stable	1:39.17
2002	My Trusty Cat	Terry J. Thompson	David R. Vance	Carl F. Pollard	1:39.54

== See also ==
- Road to the Kentucky Oaks
