= Sunland Park Racetrack & Casino =

Racino in Sunland Park, New Mexico, US

Coordinates: 31.806394°N 106.558971°W

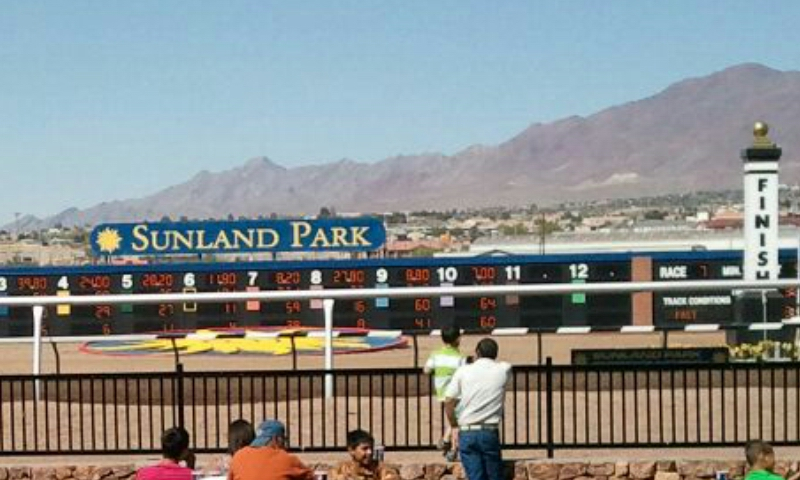
- Interactive map of Sunland Park Racetrack & Casino
- Location: Sunland Park, New Mexico
- Owned by: Gaming and Leisure Properties
- Operated by: Strategic Gaming Management
- Date opened: 1959; 67 years ago
- Race type: Thoroughbred and quarter horse

Sunland Park Racetrack & Casino (SPR&C) is a racino located in Sunland Park, New Mexico, a suburb in southern New Mexico. The casino, open 112 hours a week, also offers many electronic table games including roulette, blackjack and Texas Hold 'Em.

Opened in 1959 as a Thoroughbred racing track, Sunland Park was the only legalized gambling venue in the region for many years. In 1999, at a time when horse racing was experiencing a decline as casinos and lotteries became commonplace, New Mexico legislators allowed slot machines at the track. Now with over 700 machines in play, racing at Sunland has benefited greatly, with purses increasing from a $35,000 daily average in the early 1990s to nearly a quarter million per day today.

Sunland Park was the track where jockeys Jerry Bailey, Pat Valenzuela, and Cash Asmussen got their starts. Bill Shoemaker, who hails from the area, also rode at Sunland.

In October 2025, Strategic Gaming Management purchased SPR&C for $301 million, and sold the real estate of the property to Gaming and Leisure Properties in a leaseback transaction.

== Racing ==
The 2021–22 racing season, which features both Thoroughbreds and Quarter Horses, runs from December 31 through April 3. Live racing is traditionally offered four days each week on Tuesdays, Fridays, Saturdays, and Sundays. Year-round Simulcast wagering is also available on racetracks across the country.

=== Thoroughbreds ===
The live racing season is highlighted by the Sunland Park Derby, run at 1 1/16 miles for three-year-olds on February 18, 2024. The purse is currently $400,000. The race, which was granted grade 3 status in 2010, is included in the Road to the Kentucky Derby, awarding 20 points to the winner, 10 to second, 6 to third, 4 to fourth, and 2 to fifth. Prior to 2024, the Sunland Park Derby awarded 50–20–15–10–5 points to the 1st- through 5th-place finishers respectively, therefore the winner was essentially guaranteed a spot in the Kentucky Derby. Also prior to 2024, the race was run about a month later.

Other notable races include the $250,000 Sunland Park Oaks, a 1 1/16-mile Kentucky Oaks prep for fillies; the $200,000 Sunland Park Handicap for three-year-olds and up at 1 1/8 miles, the $100,000 Harry W. Henson Handicap for fillies and mares at one mile; the $100,000 Riley Allison Derby, 6 1/2 furlongs for three-year-olds, and the $125,000 Mine That Bird Derby, run at 1 1/8 miles.

==== Graded events ====
The following Graded events were held at Sunland Park in 2025.

Listed

- Sunland Park Derby

Ungraded Park

- Sunland Park Oaks

=== Quarterhorses ===
Sunlands top quarter horse race is the $350,000 Grade 1 Championship at Sunland Park, run January 2, 2022. The $175,000 added New Mexican Spring Futurity at 300 yards is run April 3, 2022.

== Gallery ==
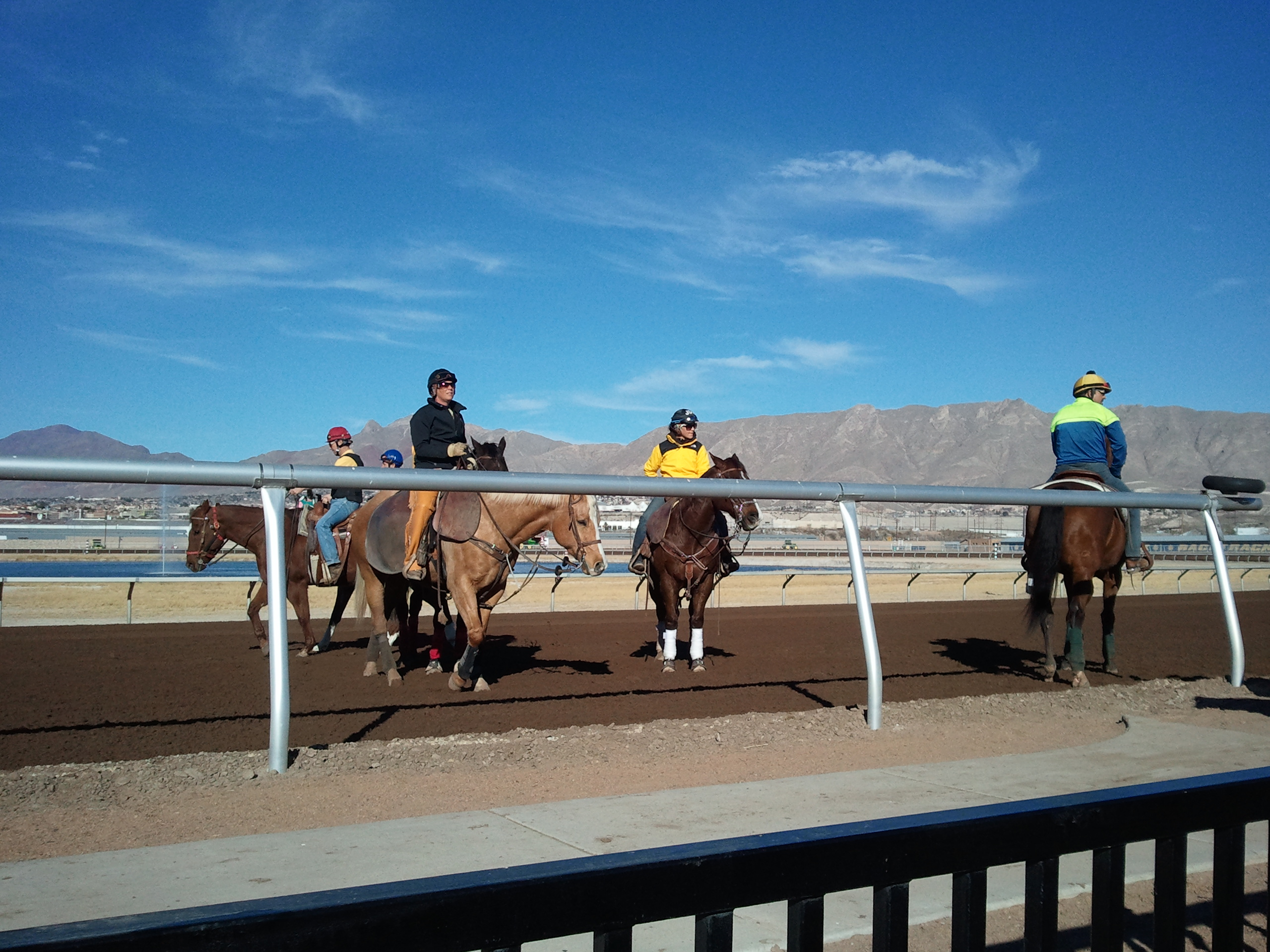

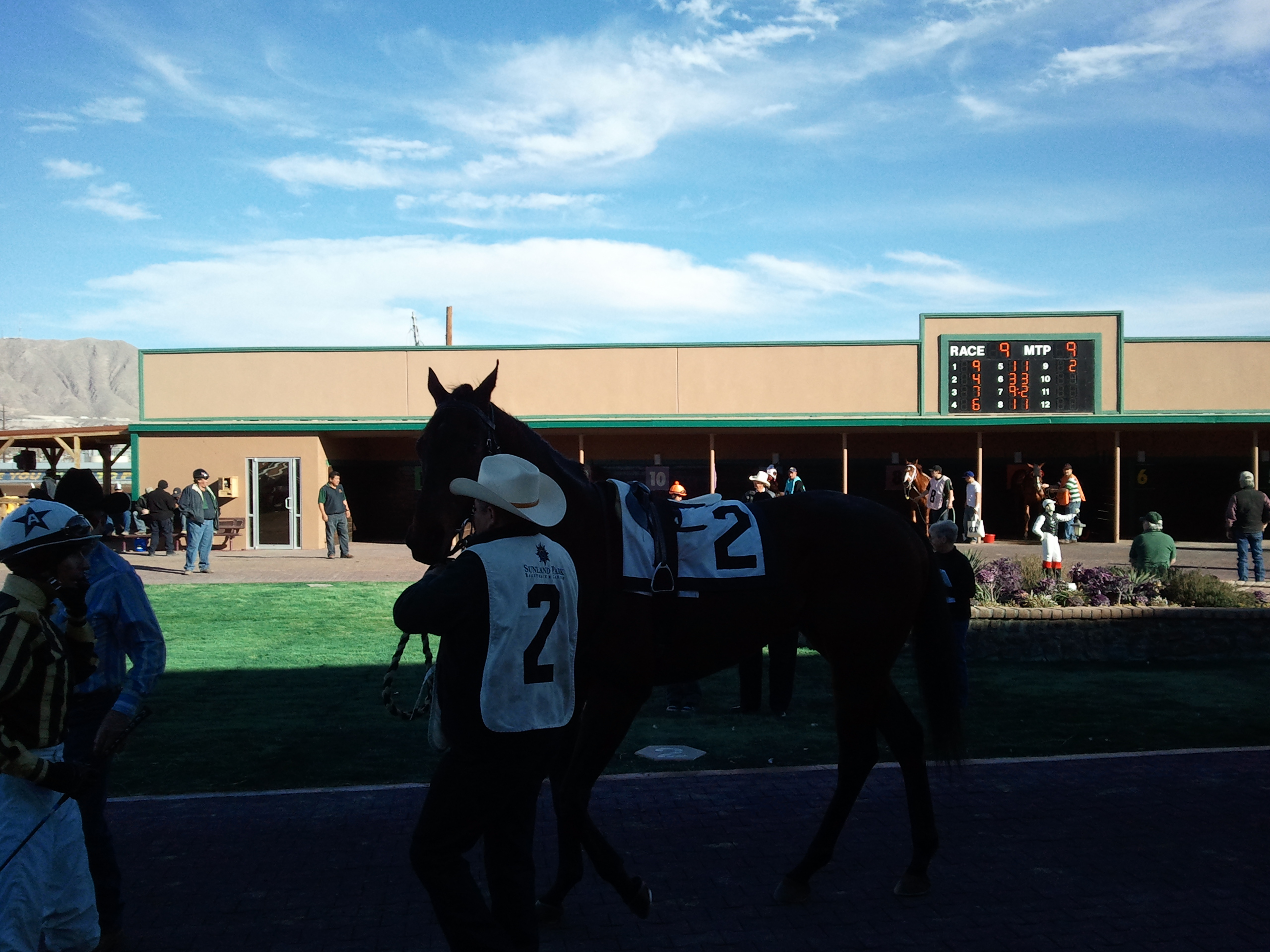

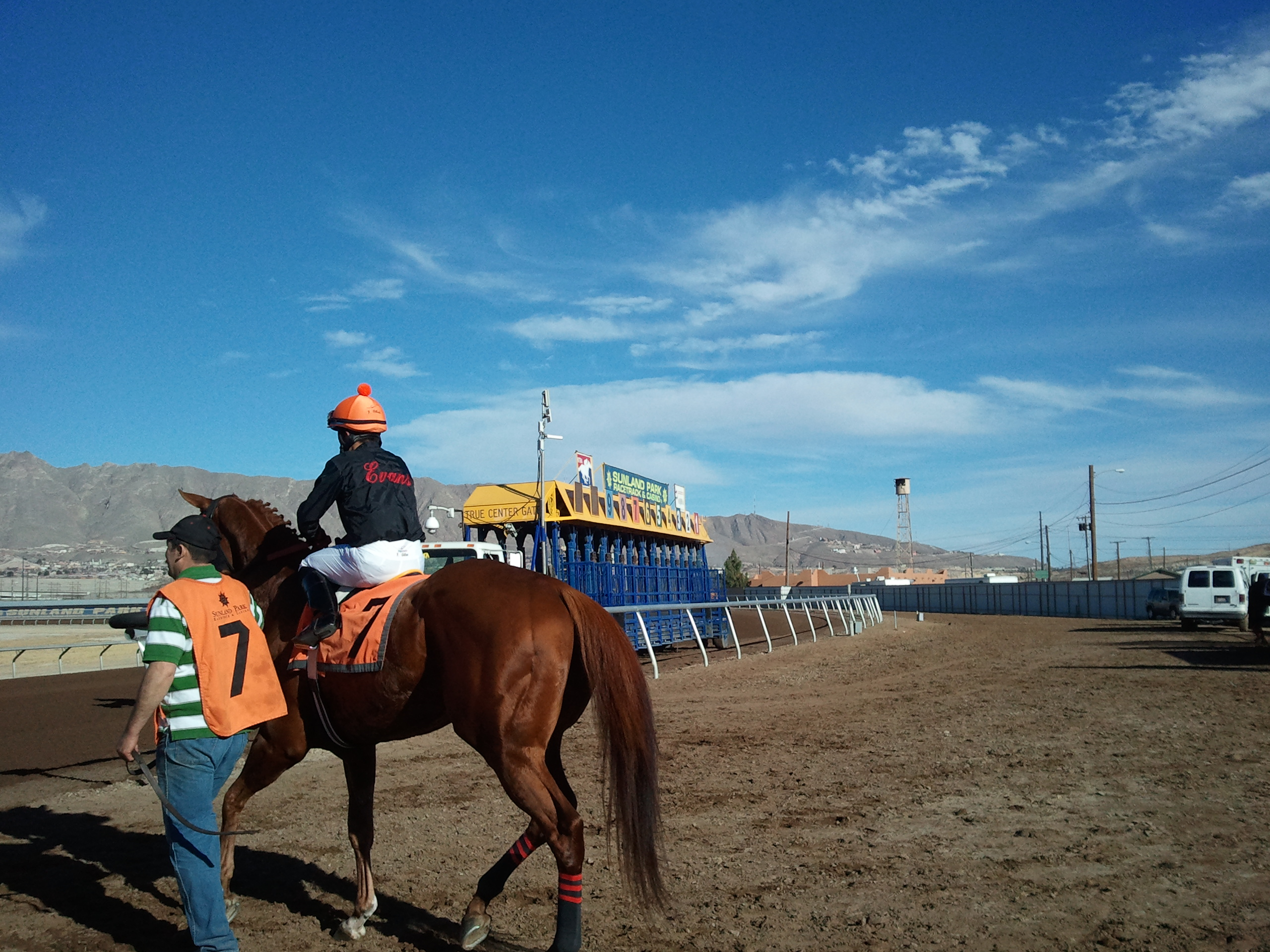
