= Delta Downs =

Racetrack and casino in Louisiana, owned by Boyd Gaming

Coordinates: 30.194°N 93.623°W

- Interactive map of Delta Downs
- No. of rooms: 200
- Gaming space: 48,000 sq ft (4,500 m^{2})
- Casino type: Racino
Delta Downs
- Interactive map of Delta Downs
- Location: Vinton, Louisiana
- Owned by: Boyd Gaming
- Date opened: September 1973
- Race type: Quarter Horse; Thoroughbred
- Course type: Flat
- Notable races: Old South Futurity & Derby; Lee Burwick Futurity & Derby; Firecracker Futurity & Derby,

Delta Downs Racetrack, Casino and Hotel is an American thoroughbred and quarter horse racetrack in Calcasieu Parish, near Vinton, Louisiana in the southwest portion of the state. The facility is owned by Boyd Gaming.

== History ==
The track opened in September 1973, under the direction of Lee Berwick. Berwick was primarily looking for a recognized facility to run Quarter Horses, having earlier held races on his farm in St. Joseph, Louisiana. Delta Downs in Vinton would hold both Quarter Horse and Thoroughbred race meetings, some years in a mixed format. In the 1990s, the track was bought by developer Shawn Scott for $10 million. Shortly thereafter, it was sold for over $100 million to Boyd Gaming after a law was passed allowing for slot machines at Delta Downs. After the purchase, Boyd Gaming made over $120 million in capital improvements. The casino, hotel and track were badly damaged by Hurricane Rita in 2005; the casino and hotel were partially opened two months later. The track was closed for about six months after the hurricane. Fueled by revenue from the slots casino, the quality of racing at Delta Downs has improved. The winter Thoroughbred meeting has produced several stakes-quality horses in recent years.

On January 11, 1990, jockey Sylvester Carmouche rode a 5-year-old named Landing Officer through a thick fog to a twenty-four length win. Landing Officer had gone off at 23-1 odds. After the race it was determined that Carmouche had hid Landing Officer in the fog as the other eight horses in the race circled the track and the jockey was subsequently charged with felony theft by fraud. Carmouche was convicted of the charges on March 14, 1990 and he was subsequently banned for ten years from state tracks by the Louisiana Racing Commission but the ban lasted just eight years. Aaron Kuriloff writing for ESPN put Sylvester Carmouche 11th of the top 25 cheats, frauds and scams perpetrated in sports around the globe.

== Track ==
The track is a 6-furlong (1.2 km) oval. There is a 550-yard (0.50 km), Quarter-Horse chute, which also works as a 1.0625-mile (1.7099 km) Thoroughbred chute, in addition to a 0.625 miles (1.006 km) Thoroughbred chute. The track surface is a mixture of sand (from the Sabine River) and clay, with a limestone base. The track has stabling for 1,200 horses. The Delta Downs grounds features horse pastures which are visible from the entrance. Draft and miniature horses and thoroughbreds are on display. The Quarter Horse Red River Rebel, owned by Malcom Chiasson, holds the track record as of 2011; he is also the leading money-winning quarter horse in Louisiana.

== Casino ==
The casino has more than 1,600 slot machines; the racino has only slots, due to restrictions in state law. The hotel has 370 rooms, and 50 suites.

== Racing season ==
The track usually holds races from November to mid-July, with the Thoroughbred meet beginning in November and the Quarter Horse meet commencing in April. Delta Downs hosts the Grade III, $1,000,000 Delta Jackpot Stakes for 2-year-olds, the Grade III, $500,000 Delta Princess Stakes for 2-year-old fillies, the Restricted Grade I Lee Burwick Futurity, the Grade II Firecracker Futurity and Restricted Gold Cup Stakes and Magnolia Stakes races.
