= Martha Washington Stakes =

- Class: Listed
- Location: Oaklawn Park Race Track; Hot Springs, Arkansas, United States
- Inaugurated: 1979
- Race type: Thoroughbred - Flat racing
- Website: www.oaklawn.com

Race information
- Distance: 1 1/16 mile (8.5 furlongs)
- Surface: Dirt
- Track: left-handed
- Qualification: Three-year-old fillies
- Weight: Assigned
- Purse: $200,000

The Martha Washington Stakes is an American Thoroughbred horse race held annually at Oaklawn Park Race Track in Hot Springs, Arkansas. Open to three-year-old fillies, it is contested on dirt over a distance of 1 1/16 mile. It is now run in late January as an early prep race in the Road to the Kentucky Oaks.

Inaugurated in 1979, it was raced at 6 furlongs (3/4 mile) until 2003 when it was modified to its present distance.

The Martha Washington Stakes was run in two divisions in 1979 and 2008.

== Records ==
Speed record:

- 1:44.62 - Wet Paint (2023)

Largest winning margin:

- 13 1/2 lengths - Eight Belles (2008)

Most wins by a jockey:

- 7 - Pat Day (1984, 1986, 1987, 1988, 1990, 1992, 1995)

Most wins by a trainer:

- 3 - William H. Fires (1988, 1995, 2005)
- 3 - Robert E. Holthus (1993, 1996, 1999)

Most wins by an owner:

- 3 - Patricia B. Blass (1988, 1995, 2005)

== Winners ==
Year	Winner	Jockey	Trainer	Owner	Time
2023	Wet Paint	Flavien Prat	Brad H. Cox	Godolphin	1:44.62
2022	Secret Oath	Robby Albarado	D. Wayne Lukas	Brilard Farms	1:46.21
2021	Will's Secret	Jon Court	Dallas Stewart	Willis Horton Racing	1:38.78
2020	Taraz	Florent Geroux	Brad H. Cox	Juddmonte	1.38.64
2019	Power Gal	David Cohen	Mark E. Casse	Gary Barber	1:39.82
2018	Red Ruby	Robby Albarado	Kellyn Gorder	Sexton, Sandra and Nicholson, Brandi	1:39.67
2017	Chanel's Legacy	Alex Birzer	David A. Cannizzo	Poindexter Thoroughbreds LLC	1:38.51
2016	Marquee Miss	Channing Hill	Ingrid Mason	Rags Racing Stable LLC	1:39.18
2015	Take Charge Brandi	Jon Court	D. Wayne Lukas	Willis D. Horton	1:39.66
2014	Aragorn Ami	Norberto Arroyo Jr.	Josie Carroll	Ivan Dalos	1:41.20
2013	Sister Ginger	Ricardo Santana Jr	Steve Asmussen	Millennium Farms/Littlebrother Farm	1:39.51
2012	Amie's Dini	Jon Court	Wayne M. Catalano	Mike D. Walker & Lou Sutterfield	1:38.72
2011	Holy Heavens	Israel Ocampo	Bernard Chatters	Dr. K. K. and Dr. Vilasini D. Jayaraman	1:42.96
2009	Rachel Alexandra	Calvin Borel	Hal R. Wiggins	L and M Partners LLC	1:36.40
2008	Sky Mom	Luis Quinonez	Steve Asmussen	Heather Stark	1:39.51
2008	Eight Belles	Terry Thompson	J. Larry Jones	Fox Hill Farms, Inc.	1:39.00
2007	Devil House	Terry Thompson	Terry Gestes	William Stiritz	1:38.83
2006	Brownie Points	Luis Quinonez	Donnie K. Von Hemel	Pin Oak Stable	1:39.69
2005	Isabell's Shoes	Terry Thompson	William H. Fires	Patricia B. Blass	1:39.11
2004	Turn To Lass	Roman Chapa	Eugene Brajczewski	Hurstland & McLaughlin	1:41.93
2003	Explosive Beauty	Jamie Theriot	Cole Norman	K. K. & V. Jayaraman	1:11.38
2002	Miss City Halo	James Lopez	Mark Hubley	Rich Stable & Lawrence	1:11.21
2001	Cheryl P.	Glen Murphy	Barry Germany	Ro G. Parra	1:10.00
2000	Miss Seffens	Jon Court	Steve Wren	Karen & Hays Biggs	1:09.20
1999	The Happy Hopper	Robby Albarado	Robert E. Holthus	Kerry & Linda Ozment	1:10.00
1998	Prospector's Song	Calvin Borel	Randy Morse	R. S. Mitchell Trust	1:11.40
1997	Zuppardo Ardo	Carlos Gonzalez	Bobby C. Barnett	John A. Franks	1:09.60
1996	Mama's Pro	Mickey Walls	Robert E. Holthus	Mrs. James Winn	1:11.80
1995	Pink Shoes	Pat Day	William H. Fires	Patricia B. Blass	1:10.60
1994	Beauty's Sake	Garrett Gomez	Larry Edwards	K. K. & V. Jayaraman	1:10.20
1993	Proper Reflection	Willie Martinez	Robert E. Holthus	Mrs. James Winn	1:11.60
1992	Vivid Imagination	Pat Day	Steven Morguelan	S. Madison	1:10.60
1991	Chance To Dance	Donald Pettinger	Donnie K. Von Hemel	Ashby Thoroughbreds IV	1:11.40
1990	Classy Irene	Pat Day	Lynn S. Whiting	W. Cal Partee	1:11.00
1989	Rugosa Rose	Antonio Castanon	Melvin F. Stute	Coelho, Fields & Valenti	1:10.00
1988	Fun Flight	Pat Day	William H. Fires	Patricia B. Blass	1:11.20
1987	Up the Apalachee	Pat Day	George Arceneaux	John Minos Simon	1:09.60
1986	Ann's Bid	Pat Day	Joseph B. Cantey	Joseph O. Morrisey	1:13.60
1985	Take My Picture	Don Howard	J. D. Roberts	Helen & L. E. Rhodes	1:10.60
1984	Robin's Rob	Pat Day	O. F. Duffield	Lyle Whiting	1:09.20
1983	Lt. Pearle	David Whited	Burl McBride	G. Givens	1:13.20
1982	Ambassador of Luck	Garth Patterson	William Carelli	Richard Ransom	1:12.20
1981	Fiddleatune	Garth Patterson	James J. Eckrosh	E. Lowrance	1:14.40
1980	Run Ky. Run	M. Bryan	Rick Hiles	W. B. Robinson	1:11.20
1979 Div 2	Sassy Simone	John Lively	Gary Thomas	George Pappas	1:13.60
1979 Div 1	Patience Worth	David Whited	Keith Wilkey	Rosenthal & Levy	1:13.20

== See also ==
- Road to the Kentucky Oaks
