= Silverbulletday Stakes =

- Class: Listed
- Location: Fair Grounds Race Course; New Orleans, Louisiana, United States
- Inaugurated: 1982
- Race type: Thoroughbred – Flat racing
- Website: Fair Grounds

Race information
- Distance: 1 mile, 70 yards
- Surface: Dirt
- Track: Left-handed
- Qualification: Three-year-old fillies
- Weight: Assigned
- Purse: $150,000

The Silverbulletday Stakes is an American Thoroughbred horse race run annually each January at Fair Grounds Race Course in New Orleans, Louisiana. A race for three-year-old fillies, it is contested on dirt over a distance of one mile and 70 yards.

Previously known as the Tiffany Lass Stakes, it was renamed in 2011 to honor U.S. Racing Hall of Fame inductee Silverbulletday.

== Records ==
Speed record:

- 1-70 yds. - 1:42.34 – Believe You Can (2012)

Most wins by a jockey:

- 3 - John Velazquez (1998, 2003 & 2005)
- 3 - Florent Geroux (2015, 2016 & 2018)

Most wins by a trainer:

- 4 - D. Wayne Lukas (1984, 1986, 1989 & 1995)

== Winners of the Silverbulletday Stakes since 2009 ==
| Year | Winner | Age | Jockey | Trainer | Owner | Dist. (Miles) | Time | Gr. |
|---|---|---|---|---|---|---|---|---|
| 2025 | Simply Joking | 3 | Jaime A. Torres | D. Whitworth Beckman | Grantley Acres, Conner, Ryan and Berkels0813 | 1-70 yds. | 1:44.30 | L |
| 2024 | West Omaha | 3 | Luis Saez | Brad Cox | Mary & Gary West | 1-70 yds. | 1:43.48 | L |
| 2023 | The Alys Look | 3 | Luis Saez | Brad Cox | Ike and Dawn Thrash | 1-70 yds. | 1:43.55 | L |
| 2022 | La Crete | 3 | Joel Rosario | Steve Asmussen | Stonestreet Stables | 1-70 yds. | 1:43.93 | L |
| 2019 | Needs Supervision | 3 | Joe Rocco Jr. | Jeremiah O'Dwyer | Howling Pigeon Farms LLC, Gary Barber, et al. | 1-70 yds. | 1:45.34 | L |
| 2018 | Stronger Than Ever | 3 | Florent Geroux | Kenneth McPeek | Fern Circle Stables | 1-70 yds. | 1:44.28 | L |
| 2017 | Farrell | 3 | Channing Hill | Wayne M. Catalano | Coffeepot Stables (Bob Cummings & Annette Bacola) | 1-70 yds. | 1:44.01 | L |
| 2016 | Stageplay | 3 | Florent Geroux | Steve Asmussen | Mike G. Rutherford | 1-70 yds. | 1:43.76 | L |
| 2015 | I'm a Chatterbox | 3 | Florent Geroux | J. Larry Jones | Grayson Farm | 1-70 yds. | 1:43.21 | |
| 2014 | Unbridled Forever | 3 | Robby Albarado | Dallas Stewart | Charles E. Fipke | 1-70 yds. | 1:43.03 | |
| 2013 | Touch Magic | 3 | James Graham | Patrick Devereux Jr. | Coteau Grove Farms | 1-70 yds. | 1:45.00 | III |
| 2012 | Believe You Can | 3 | Rosie Napravnik | J. Larry Jones | Brereton C. Jones | 1-70 yds. | 1:42.34 | III |
| 2011 | Bouquet Booth | 3 | Shaun Bridgmohan | Steve Margolis | Right Time Racing, LLC | 1-40 yds. | 1:41.24 | |
| 2010 | Jody Slew | 3 | Miguel Mena | Bret Calhoun | Martin Racing Stable/Dan Morgan | 1-40 yds. | 1:41.24 | |
| 2009 | Just Jenda | 3 | Terry J. Thompson | J. Larry Jones | Cindy Jones | 1-mile | 1:38.15 | |

== See also ==
- Road to the Kentucky Oaks
