= Santa Ysabel Stakes =

- Class: Grade III
- Location: Santa Anita Park; Arcadia, California, United States
- Inaugurated: 1968
- Race type: Thoroughbred – Flat racing
- Website: www.santaanita.com

Race information
- Distance: 1 1/16 miles (8.5 furlongs)
- Surface: Dirt
- Track: Left-handed
- Qualification: Three-year-old fillies
- Weight: 124 lbs. with allowances
- Purse: US$100,000

The Santa Ysabel Stakes is an American Thoroughbred horse race once run during January but now run in March at Santa Anita Park in Arcadia, California. The race is open to fillies, age three, willing to race one and one-sixteenths miles (8.5 furlongs) on the dirt. The race is a Grade III event with a current purse of $100,000 and is part of the Road to the Kentucky Oaks.

Inaugurated in 1968, the Santa Ysabel Stakes was contested at 7 furlongs in 1970 but has otherwise been run at 1 1/16 miles. It was run in two divisions in 1968, 1970, 1972, and 1979.

== Records ==
Speed record:

- 1:41.10 – Midnight Bisou (2018)

Most wins by a jockey:

- 4 – Bill Shoemaker (1974, 1978, 1985, 1988)
- 4 – Laffit Pincay Jr. (1970, 1973, 1981, 1991)
- 4 – Chris McCarron (1983, 1984, 1994, 2002)
- 4 – Mike E. Smith (2014, 2016, 2017, 2018)
- 4 - Juan J. Hernandez (2022, 2024, 2025, 2026)

Most wins by a trainer:

- 11 – Bob Baffert (2003, 2009, 2011, 2013, 2014, 2021, 2022, 2023, 2024, 2025, 2026)

Most wins by an owner:

- 3 – Kaleem Shah (2011, 2014, 2020)
- 3 – Michael Lund Petersen (2023, 2024, 2025)

== Winners of the Santa Ysabel Stakes since 1968 ==
Year	Winner	Age	Jockey	Trainer	Owner	Distance (Miles)	Time	Grade
2026	Forced Entry	3	Juan J. Hernandez	Bob Baffert	Karl Watson, Michael E. Pegram & Paul Weitman	1 1/16 miles	1:44.79	III
2025	Maysam	3	Juan J. Hernandez	Bob Baffert	Michael Lund Petersen	1 1/16 miles	1:45.62	III
2024	Kinza	3	Juan J. Hernandez	Bob Baffert	Michael Lund Petersen	1 1/16 miles	1:44.16	III
2023	Faiza	3	Flavien Prat	Bob Baffert	Michael Lund Petersen	1 1/16 miles	1:44.66	III
2022	Eda	3	Juan Hernandez	Bob Baffert	Baoma Corp	1 1/16 miles	1:44.31	III
2021	Beautiful Gift	3	John Velazquez	Bob Baffert	Baoma Corp	1 1/16 miles	1:44.83	III
2020	Donna Veloce	3	Flavien Prat	Simon Callaghan	Kaleem Shah Inc et al.	1-1/16	1:45.43	III
2019	not held							
2018	Midnight Bisou	3	Mike E. Smith	William Spawr	Allen Racing LLC and Bloom Racing Stable LLC	1-1/16	1:41.10	III
2017	Unique Bella	3	Mike E. Smith	Jerry Hollendorfer	Don Alberto Stable	1-1/16	1:43.11	III
2016	Songbird	3	Mike E. Smith	Jerry Hollendorfer	Fox Hill Farms	1-1/16	1:43.02	III
2015	Stellar Wind	3	Victor Espinoza	John W. Sadler	Hronis Racing	1-1/16	1:43.16	III
2014	Awesome Baby	3	Mike E. Smith	Bob Baffert	Kaleem Shah	1-1/16	1:42.89	III
2013	Fiftyshadesofhay	3	Rafael Bejarano	Bob Baffert	Karl Watson, Michael E. Pegram & Paul Weitman	1-1/16	1:41.58	III
2012	Willa B Awesome	3	Martin Pedroza	Walther Solis	P.Daniels, P.London, J.Winters & P.Lovingier	1-1/16	1:41.75	III
2011	May Day Rose	3	Rafael Bejarano	Bob Baffert	Kaleem Shah	1-1/16	1:42.81	III
2010	Crisp	3	Joel Rosario	John W. Sadler	Michael Talla	1-1/16	1:43.56	III
2009	Century Park	3	Tyler Baze	Bob Baffert	Donald R. Dizney	1-1/16	1:43.32	III
2008	Final Fling	3	Joseph Talamo	Jeff Mullins	Michael House	1-1/16	1:41.96	III
2007	Baroness Thatcher	3	Garrett Gomez	Patrick Biancone	Zayat Stables	1-1/16	1:44.31	III
2006	Itty Bitty Pretty	3	Pat Valenzuela	Douglas F. O'Neill	STD Racing Stable & Wood	1-1/16	1:44.60	III
2005	Sweet Catomine	3	David Flores	Julio C. Canani	Pam & Martin Wygod	1-1/16	1:43.77	III
2004	A. P. Adventure	3	Alex Solis	Wallace Dollase	Bob & Beverly Lewis	1-1/16	1:44.27	III
2003	Atlantic Ocean	3	David Flores	Bob Baffert	The Thoroughbred Corp.	1-1/16	1:43.25	III
2002	Bella Bella Bella	3	Chris McCarron	Jenine Sahadi	Team Valor	1-1/16	1:44.14	III
2001	Collect Call	3	Alex Solis	Christopher Paasch	Rod Rodriquez	1-1/16	1:44.69	III
2000	Surfside	3	Pat Day	D. Wayne Lukas	Overbrook Farm	1-1/16	1:43.53	III
1999	Holywood Picture	3	Octavio Vergara	James K. Chapman	Chapman & McArthur	1-1/16	1:43.48	III
1998	Nonies Dancer Ali †	3	Garrett Gomez	William J. Morey Jr.	Boyajuan, Catanzaro, Gellepies	1-1/16	1:44.14	III
1997	Sharp Cat	3	Corey Nakatani	D. Wayne Lukas	The Thoroughbred Corp.	1-1/16	1:41.34	
1996	Antespend	3	Chris Antley	Ronald McAnally	Jack Kent Cooke	1-1/16	1:43.87	
1995	Ski Dancer	3	Kent Desormeaux	Gary F. Jones	Kallenberg Thoroughbred, Inc.	1-1/16	1:44.24	
1994	Princess Mitterand	3	Chris McCarron	Neil D. Drysdale	Irving & Marjorie Cowan	1-1/16	1:43.25	
1993	Likeable Style	3	Gary Stevens	Richard E. Mandella	Golden Eagle Farm	1-1/16	1:44.74	
1992	Crownette	3	Pat Valenzuela	D. Wayne Lukas	Jim Paliafito	1-1/16	1:44.33	
1991	Nice Assay	3	Laffit Pincay Jr.	J. Paco Gonzalez	Trudy McCaffery & John Toffan	1-1/16	1:43.60	
1990	Bright Candles	3	Gary Stevens	D. Wayne Lukas	Lukas & Overbrook Farm	1-1/16	1:45.60	
1989	Gorgeous	3	Eddie Delahoussaye	Neil D. Drysdale	Robert N. Clay	1-1/16	1:42.40	
1988	Jeanne Jones	3	Bill Shoemaker	Charles E. Whittingham	Golden Eagle Farm	1-1/16	1:43.60	
1987	Perchance to Dream	3	Ray Sibille	Victor Oppegard	Sandra Oppegard	1-1/16	1:43.40	
1986	Trim Colony	3	Gary Stevens	Christopher Speckert	Buckland Farm	1-1/16	1:44.80	
1985	Savannah Dancer	3	Bill Shoemaker	Ronald McAnally	Allen E. Paulson	1-1/16	1:44.20	
1984	Sales Bulletin	3	Chris McCarron	Harry A. Proctor	Glen Hill Farm	1-1/16	1:44.00	
1983	Ski Goggle	3	Chris McCarron	A. Thomas Doyle	Zenya Yoshida	1-1/16	1:41.60	
1982	Avigaition	3	Eddie Delahoussaye	Vivian Pulliam	C. Norman Pulliam	1-1/16	1:42.40	
1981	Lovely Robbery	3	Laffit Pincay Jr.	Robert J. Frankel	Jerry Moss	1-1/16	1:44.20	
1980	Back At Two	3	Fernando Toro	Gordon C. Campbell	M/M Douglas Carver	1-1/16	1:45.20	
1979 #	Maytide	3	Ángel Cordero Jr.	Vincent Clyne	Elmendorf Farm	1-1/16	1:44.00	
1979 #	Top Soil	3	Donald Pierce	Ronald McAnally	Elmendorf Farm	1-1/16	1:44.00	
1978	Palmistry	3	Bill Shoemaker	Willard L. Proctor	William Haggin Perry	1-1/16	1:44.40	
1977	Geothermal	3	Marco Castaneda	Randy Sechrest	Nelson Bunker Hunt	1-1/16	1:43.00	
1976	Flunsa	3	Sandy Hawley	James Jiminez	R. Oliver & B. Menchen	1-1/16	1:43.80	
1975	Double You Lou	3	Sandy Hawley	M. G. Williams	Silver Creek Ranch	1-1/16	1:44.80	
1974	Miss Musket	3	Bill Shoemaker	Charles E. Whittingham	Aaron U. Jones	1-1/16	1:41.80	
1973	Belle Marie	3	Laffit Pincay Jr.	Charles E. Whittingham	Kinship Stable	1-1/16	1:45.40	
1972 #	Chargerette	3	Robert Nono	Harold C. McBride	S. Crivello & S. Webber	1-1/16	1:43.00	
1972 #	Sumatra	3	Ángel Cordero Jr.	Laz Barrera	Charles T. Wilson Jr.	1-1/16	1:43.20	
1971	Balcony's Babe	3	Eddie Belmonte	F. A. Miquelez	M/M. Ellwood B. Johnston	1-1/16	1:43.20	
1970 #	Linda Summers	3	Rudy Rosales	Joseph S. Dunn	William R. Hawn	1-1/16	1:23.00	
1970 #	Cathy Honey	3	Laffit Pincay Jr.	Robert L. Wheeler	Flag Is Up Farms	1-1/16	1:22.80	
1969	Easter Junction	3	Eddie Belmonte	Jimmy Wallace	M/M. Ellwood B. Johnston	1-1/16	1:42.80	
1968 #	Silk Hat II	3	Jerry Lambert	Laz Barrera	William M. Hackman	1-1/16	1:45.40	
1968 #	Fish Net	3	Braulio Baeza	Robert L. Wheeler	C. V. Whitney	1-1/16	1:44.80	

A # designates that the race was run in two divisions in 1968, 1970, 1972 and 1979.

* † In 1998 Love Lock finished first but was disqualified after testing
