= UAE Oaks =

- Class: Group 3
- Location: Meydan Racecourse; Dubai, United Arab Emirates
- Inaugurated: 2001
- Race type: Thoroughbred - Flat racing
- Website: UAE Racing

Race information
- Distance: 1900 metres
- Surface: Dirt
- Track: Left-handed
- Qualification: 3yo fillies
- Purse: $250,000

The UAE Oaks is a flat horse race in the United Arab Emirates for three-year-old thoroughbred fillies run over 1900 metres on dirt at Meydan Racecourse in Dubai in late February or early March.

It was first contested in 2001 over 1800 metres on dirt at Nad Al Sheba Racecourse before being transferred to Meydan in 2010 where it was run on the synthetic Tapeta Footings surface and the distance extended. In 2015 the synthetic surface at Meydan was replaced by a dirt track.

The UAE Oaks began as an ungraded race before promoted to Listed level in 2006. It was elevated to Group 3 in 2011.

== Records ==
Record time:

- 1:48.59 - Folk 2007 (1800 metres)
- 1:58.35 - Down On Da Bayou 2020 (1900 metres)

Most wins by a jockey:

- 6 - Frankie Dettori (2001, 2002, 2003, 2005, 2009, 2011)

Most wins by a trainer:

- 10 - Saeed bin Suroor (2001, 2002, 2003, 2005, 2008, 2009, 2011, 2013, 2014, 2015)

Most wins by an owner:

- 11 - Godolphin Racing (2001, 2002, 2003, 2005, 2009, 2011, 2012, 2013, 2014, 2015, 2019)

== Winners ==
Year	Winner	Jockey	Trainer	Owner	Time
2026	Labwah	Bernardo Pinheiro	Salem bin Ghadayer	Sheik Hamdan bin Mohammed Al Maktoum	2:00.57
2025	Queen Azteca	Carlos Lopez	Niels Petersen	Glaesner Racing APS	2:00.43
2024	Manama Gold	Adrie de Vries	Fawzi Nass	Victorious Racing	2:00.08
2023	Mimi Kakushi	Mickael Barzalona	Salem bin Ghadayer	Hamdan bin Mohammed Al Maktoum	2:00:01
2022	Shahama	Adrie de Vries	Fawzi Nass	KHK Racing	2:02.25
2021	Mnasek	Pat Dobbs	Doug Watson	Al Rashid Stables	1:59.18
2020	Down On Da Bayou	Mickael Barzalona	Salem bin Ghadayer	Hamdan bin Mohammed Al Maktoum	1:58.35
2019	Divine Image	William Buick	Charlie Appleby	Godolphin	2:01.76
2018	Rayya	Pat Dobbs	Doug Watson	Rashid bin Humaid Al Nuaimi	1:59.66
2017	Nomorerichblondes	Antonio Fresu	A bin Harmash	Buti Bintooq Almarri	2:01.85
2016	Polar River	Pat Dobbs	Doug Watson	Valentin Bukhtoyarov & Evgeny Kappushev	2:00.57
2015	Local Time	James Doyle	Saeed bin Suroor	Godolphin	2:00.90
2014	Ihtimal	Silvestre de Sousa	Saeed bin Suroor	Godolphin	1:58.51
2013	Shuruq	Paul Hanagan	Saeed bin Suroor	Godolphin	1:58.72
2012	Falls of Lora	Mickael Barzalona	Mahmood Al Zarooni	Godolphin	2:01.12
2011	Khawlah	Frankie Dettori	Saeed bin Suroor	Godolphin	1:58.51
2010	Raihana*	Christophe Soumillon	Mike de Kock	Mohammed Bin Khalifa Al Maktoum	1:58.71
2009	Devotee	Frankie Dettori	Saeed bin Suroor	Godolphin	1:51.09
2008	Cocoa Beach*	Ted Durcan	Saeed bin Suroor	Princess Haya of Jordan	1:49.09
2007	Folk	Kerrin McEvoy	Ismail Mohammed	Hamdan bin Mohammed Al Maktoum	1:48.59
2006	Imperial Ice*	Kevin Shea	Herman Brown	Rupert Plersch & Robert Harrison	1:52.14
2005	Satin Kiss	Frankie Dettori	Saeed bin Suroor	Godolphin	1:53.28
2004	Tamarillo	Ted Durcan	Mazin Al Kurdi	Rashid bin Mohammed	1:51.51
2003	Danuta	Frankie Dettori	Saeed bin Suroor	Godolphin	1:49.69
2002	Imperial Gesture	Frankie Dettori	Saeed bin Suroor	Godolphin	1:49.61
2001	Laoub	Frankie Dettori	Saeed bin Suroor	Godolphin	1:50.21

== See also ==
- Road to the Kentucky Oaks
- List of United Arab Emirates horse races
