= Beaumont Stakes =

- Class: Grade II
- Location: Keeneland Race Course; Lexington, Kentucky, United States
- Inaugurated: 1986
- Race type: Thoroughbred – Flat racing
- Sponsor: MiddleGround Capital (2024)
- Website: Keeneland

Race information
- Distance: 7 furlongs and 184 feet
- Surface: Dirt
- Track: Left-handed
- Qualification: Three-year-old fillies
- Weight: 123 lbs with allowances
- Purse: $400,000 (2022)

The Beaumont Stakes is a Grade II American Thoroughbred horse race for three-year-old fillies over a distance of 7 furlongs and 184 feet on the dirt held annually in early April at Keeneland Race Course, Lexington, Kentucky during the spring meeting.

== History ==
The race is named in honor of the Beaumont Farm of Hal Price Headley, one of Keeneland's founders. The Beaumont is run on the Beard Course which is named after Major Louie Beard, another one of Keeneland's founders.

The event was inaugurated on 5 April 1986 and was won by Classy Cathy, trained by the former jockey Joseph M. Bollero in a time of 1:27 3/5.

The event was classified as Grade III in 1990 when it was won by the ill-fated 1989 US Champion Two-Year-Old, Go For Wand. In 1993 the event was upgraded to Grade II and held that class until 2016 when it was downgraded back to Grade III.

In 2023 the American Graded Stakes Committee upgraded the event to Grade II status.

== Records ==
Speed record

- 1:23.85 – A Fine Chardonnay (2026)

Margins

- 8 1/2 lengths – Go For Wand (1990), Matareya (2022)

Most wins by a jockey

- 4 – Pat Day (1994, 1997, 1998, 2003)

Most wins by a trainer

- 3 – Brad H. Cox (2022, 2023, 2024)

Most wins by an owner

- 2 – Jan Siegel Mace Siegel & Samantha Siegel (1991, 1992)
- 2 – William S. Farish III (1987, 1997)
- 2 - Godolphin (2022, 2025)

== Winners ==
Year	Winner	Jockey	Trainer	Owner	Time	Purse	Grade	Ref
2026	A Fine Chardonnay	Brian J. Hernandez Jr.	Ian R. Wilkes	Double 22 Stables	1:23.85	$400,000	II	
2025	Verity	Vincent Cheminaud	Eoin Harty	Godolphin	1:27.18	$365,000	II	
2024	Denim and Pearls	Flavien Prat	Brad H. Cox	Red White and Blue Racing	1:26.54	$395,063	II	
2023	Key of Life	Flavien Prat	Brad H. Cox	Flurry Racing Stables & Hoffman Family Racing	1:27.32	$390,250	II	
2022	Matareya	Flavien Prat	Brad H. Cox	Godolphin Racing	1:27.55	$400,000	III	
2021	Twenty Carat	Luis Saez	Wesley A. Ward	Three Chimneys Farm	1:26.04	$150,000	III	
2020	Four Graces	Julien R. Leparoux	Ian Wilkes	Whitham Thoroughbreds	1:24.90	$98,000	III	
2019	Fancy Dress Party	Luis Saez	Ben Colebrook	LNJ Foxwoods	1:28.18	$147,000	III	
2018	Gas Station Sushi	Corey Nakatani	Richard Baltas	Riley Racing Stables, Jason Tackitt, Megan J. Tackitt & Mike Hensen	1:26.77	$150,000	III	
2017	Sweet Loretta	Javier Castellano	Todd A. Pletcher	St. Elias Stable	1:27.77	$150,000	III	
2016	Lightstream	Julien R. Leparoux	Brian A. Lynch	Up Hill Stable & Head of Plains Partners	1:26.27	$150,000	III	
2015	Miss Ella	Rajiv Maragh	H. Graham Motion	Jack Swain III	1:28.11	$250,000	II	
2014	Ready to Act	Javier Castellano	Chad C. Brown	Klaravich Stables & William Lawrence	1:28.08	$200,000	II	
2013	Ciao Bella Luna	Joel Rosario	Jerry Hollendorfer	Gillian Campbell, William Martin, Car-Den Racing Stable & Greenwood Lodge Farm	1:26.92	$150,000	II	
2012	Gypsy Robin	Jeffrey Sanchez	Wesley A. Ward	King 9 Stables, Bell, Gatewood, Bret Jones & Wesley A. Ward	1:28.46	$150,000	II	
2011	Turbulent Descent	David R. Flores	Mike Puype	Blinkers On Racing Stable, Strauss, Aurelio, Butler, Coons, Lapso, et al.	1:26.12	$150,000	II	
2010	Franny Freud	Garrett K. Gomez	John P. Terranova II	Paul Pompa Jr., Stephen Yarbrough & Anthony Grey	1:26.89	$150,000	II	
2009	War Kill	Julien R. Leparoux	Kenneth G. McPeek	Dixiana Stables	1:25.97	$150,000	II	
2008	Ariege	Garrett K. Gomez	Robert J. Frankel	IEAH Stables & Pegasus Stables	1:25.81	$250,000	II	
2007	Street Sounds	Edgar S. Prado	Michael R. Matz	Hidden Creek Farm	1:24.93	$250,000	II	
2006	Diplomat Lady	Cornelio Velásquez	Christopher S. Paasch	Charles Cono	1:27.97	$250,000	II	
2005	In the Gold	Rafael Bejarano	Nicholas P. Zito	Live Oak Plantation	1:26.04	$250,000	II	
2004	Victory U. S. A.	Jerry D. Bailey	Bob Baffert	Thomas F. Van Meter II	1:27.06	$250,000	II	
2003	My Boston Gal	Pat Day	Carl A. Nafzger	J. Chester Porter, Randy Bloch & Phil Milner	1:26.87	$250,000	II	
2002	Proper Gamble	Javier Castellano	Todd A. Pletcher	Stoneway Farm	1:28.79	$250,000	II	
2001	Xtra Heat	Rick Wilson	John E. Salzman Sr.	Kenneth Taylor & John E. Salzman Sr.	1:27.86	$250,000	II	
2000	Sahara Gold	Jerry D. Bailey	Claude R. McGaughey III	Stonerside Stable	1:26.58	$136,850	II	
1999	Swingin On Ice	Robby Albarado	Josie Carroll	Don Amos	1:25.61	$135,350	II	
1998	Star of Broadway	Pat Day	D. Wayne Lukas	James C. Spence	1:26.67	$147,000	II	
1997	Make Haste	Pat Day	Neil J. Howard	William S. Farish III	1:28.08	$139,125	II	Dead heat
1997	Screamer	Robby Albarado	Mark A. Hennig	Roberta Mary Zuckerman	1:28.08	$139,125	II	Dead heat
1996	Golden Gale	Mike E. Smith	Nicholas P. Zito	Dogwood Stable	1:26.10	$136,125	II	
1995	Dixieland Gold	Dave Penna	Louis M. Goldfine	Arthur I. Appleton	1:27.42	$112,700	II	
1994	Her Temper	Pat Day	Kenneth G. McPeek	Mark Stanley	1:28.41	$108,800	II	
1993	Roamin Rachel	Chris Antley	Claude R. McGaughey III	Tri Honors Stable	1:26.48	$108,800	II	
1992	§ Fluttery Danseur	Shane Sellers	Brian A. Mayberry	Jan Siegel Mace Siegel & Samantha Siegel	1:27.46	$82,950	III	
1991	Ifyoucouldseemenow	Martin A. Pedroza	Brian A. Mayberry	Jan Siegel Mace Siegel & Samantha Siegel	1:27.01	$83,500	III	
1990	Go for Wand	Randy Romero	William Badgett Jr.	Christiana Stables	1:26.40	$83,050	III	
1989	Exquisite Mistress	Don Brumfield	Joseph E. Broussard	Kimbrough & Ladiner	1:28.60	$56,575		
1988	On To Royalty	Craig Perret	Benjamin W. Perkins Jr.	Hidden Oak Stable	1:26.60	$75,200		
1987	Fold the Flag	Sandy Hawley	Del W. Carroll II	William S. Farish III	1:28.20	$68,850		
1986	Classy Cathy	Earlie Fires	Joseph M. Bollero	Edward A. Cox Jr.	1:27.60	$57,550		

Legend:
All Weather Track Dirt
Notes:
† Exact distance is 7 furlongs and 184 feet run on the Beard Course
§ Ran as part of an entry

== See also ==
- List of American and Canadian Graded races
- Road to the Kentucky Oaks
