= Busanda Stakes =

- Class: Ungraded stakes
- Location: Aqueduct Racetrack; Queens, New York, United States
- Inaugurated: 1974
- Race type: Thoroughbred

Race information
- Distance: 1 mile, 70 yards
- Surface: Dirt
- Track: left-handed
- Qualification: Three-year-old fillies
- Purse: US$100,000

The Busanda Stakes is an American Thoroughbred horse race that is held at Aqueduct Racetrack in Queens, New York in mid-January each year; the 42nd outing was held in 2015.

The race is an ungraded stakes event for three-year-old fillies. Its current purse is $100,000. It is named for racing mare Busanda who, bred to Tom Fool, produced Buckpasser.

Since inception, the race has been run at various distances. From 1974 through 1976 the race length was seven furlongs (1.408 km) then from 1977 through 1982 it was set at 8 1/2 furlongs (1.710 km). Since 1983 the race length has been one mile plus 70 yards (1.673 km).

== Past winners ==
- 2024 – Gin Gin (1:53.31) (Trevor McCarthy) (Grade I winner)
- 2023 – Occult (1:54.78) (Dylan Davis)
- 2022 – Magic Circle (1:51.29) (Jose Ortiz)
- 2021 – The Grass Is Blue (1:54.90) (Manny Franco)
- 2020 – Harvey's Lil Goil (1:54.49) (Junior Alvarado) (Grade I winner)
- 2019 – Always Shopping (1:52.24) (Manny Franco)
- 2018 – Midnight Disguise (1:55.81) (Trevor McCarthy)
- 2017 – Lockdown (1:44.75) (Kendrick Carmouche)
- 2016 – Flora Dora (1:45.40) (José Ortiz)
- 2015 – Overprepared (1:44.69) (Irad Ortiz Jr.)
- 2014 – Fierce Boots (1:46.62)
- 2013 – Princess of Sylmar (1:41.27) (Chris DeCarlo) (Multiple Grade I winner)
- 2012 – Captivating Lass (1:43.74) (Michael J. Luzzi)
- 2011 – Dance Quietly (1:45.05) (Ramon Domínguez)
- 2010 – Age of Humor (1:45.87) (Rosie Napravnik)
- 2009 – Pumpkin Shell (1:42.30) (Charles C. Lopez)
- 2008 – Paint Me Red (1:44.06) (Ramon Domínguez)
- 2007 – Sagamoon (1:43.27) (Eibar Coa)
- 2006 – Daytime Promise (1:43.49) (Norberto Arroyo Jr.)
- 2005 – Amazing Buy (1:44 2/5) (Norberto Arroyo Jr.)
- 2004 – Island Sand (1:43) (Pablo Fragoso) (Grade I winner)
- 2003 – Cyber Secret (1:41 4/5) (Jean-Luc Samyn)
- 2002 – Totally Wild (1:43 2/5) (Charles C. Lopez)
- 2001 – Diversa (1:41 2/5) (Joe Bravo)
- 2000 – Quit Complaining (1:45 3/5) (Shaun Bridgmohan)
- 1999 – Super Skirt (1:45 1/5) (Carlos Cruz)
- 1998 – Above The Light (1:45 1/5) (Herb McCauley)
- 1997 – Roana Gale (1:43 4/5) (Richard Migliore)
- 1996 – Little Miss Fast (1:41) (Joe Bravo)
- 1995 – Limit (1:44 3/5) (Richard Migliore)
- 1994 – Ask Shananie (1:44 4/5) (Robbie Davis)
- 1993 – Aztec Hill (1:42 2/5) (Mike E. Smith) (Multiple Graded Stakes winner)
- 1992 – His Ginger (1:45 1/5) (Joe Rocco)
- 1991 – I'm A Thriller (1:44.91) (Art Madrid Jr.)
- 1990 – Pacem in Christie (1:44 1/5) (Jorge F. Chavez)
- 1989 – Dreamy Mimi (1:44) (Ángel Cordero Jr.) (Grade I winner)
- 1988 – Beru (1:46 2/5) (Nick Santagata)
- 1987 – Bold Mate (1:42 3/5) (Jean-Luc Samyn)
- 1986 – Patricia J. K. (1:43 4/5) (Jorge Velásquez)
- 1985 – Count Pennies (1:45 1/5) (Ruben Hernandez)
- 1984 – Mile High Lady (1:47) (Robbie Davis)
- 1983 – Lady Norcliffe (1:43 3/5) (Michael Venezia)
- 1982 – Polite Rebuff (1:44 1/5) (Ángel Cordero Jr.)
- 1981 – Wayward Lass (1:45 3/5) (Cash Asmussen) (Multiple Grade I winner, 1981 Champion Three Year Old Filly)
- 1980 – Espadrille (1:46 1/5) (Eric Beitia)
- 1979 – Out Ruled (1:44 4/5) (Jamie Arellano)
- 1978 – Bemis Heights (1:44 2/5) (Ron Turcotte)
- 1977 – Like Ducks (1:48 3/5) (Steve Cauthen)
- 1976 – Stick To Beauty (1:24 3/5) (Ron Turcotte)
- 1975 – Alpine Lass (1:23 1/5) (Ángel Cordero Jr.) (Grade I winner, Bold Ruler's last foal)
- 1974 – Quick Fare (1:25 2/5) (Michael Venezia)

In 1980, Going East finished first but was disqualified and placed third.

== See also ==
- Road to the Kentucky Oaks
