= Sunland Park Oaks =

- Class: Listed stakes
- Location: Sunland Park Racetrack, Sunland Park, New Mexico, United States
- Inaugurated: 2001
- Race type: Thoroughbred - Flat racing

Race information
- Distance: 1 mile (8 furlongs)
- Surface: Dirt
- Track: left-handed
- Qualification: Three-year-old fillies
- Purse: $250,000

The Sunland Park Oaks (formerly the WinStar Oaks) is an American Thoroughbred horse race open to three-year-old fillies and mares racing one mile (formerly one and one sixteenth miles) on the dirt. The Oaks, an ungraded stakes event, is currently held in February at Sunland Park Racetrack & Casino (founded in 1959) in New Mexico.

Once sponsored by WinStar Farm in Kentucky where Distorted Humor and Tiznow stand, the race offers a purse of $250,000. Begun as a one and one sixteenth mile race, then taken down to a mile, it went back to a one and one-sixteenth mile and in 2024 returned again to one mile.

Since 2013, the Oaks has been part of the Road to the Kentucky Oaks, a series of races through which fillies qualify for the Kentucky Oaks. As of 2024, the Sunland Park Oaks offers Kentucky Oaks (G1) qualifying points of 20-10-6-4-2 to the respective top five finishers.

The race was not run in 2016 due to an outbreak of equine herpesvirus. The race was not run in 2020 or 2021 due to the worldwide pandemic.

National Museum of Racing and Hall of Fame jockey Jerry Bailey and Mike E. Smith, as well as jockeys Patrick Valenzuela and Cash Asmussen, all began their careers at Sunland Park.

== Records ==
Speed record:

- 1:41.06 @ 1 1/16 miles: Midnight Lucky (2013) (new track record)

Most wins by a jockey:

- 4 - Victor Espinoza (2006, 2007, 2009, 2015)

Most wins by a trainer:

- 9 - Bob Baffert (2007, 2009, 2011, 2012, 2013, 2014, 2015, 2019, 2026)

Most wins by an owner:

- 2 - Karl Watson, Paul Weitman (2007, 2013)
- 2 - Peachtree Stable (2011, 2012)
- 2 - Chris G. Coleman (2004, 2023)

== Winners ==
Year	Winner	Jockey	Trainer	Owner	Distance	Time
2026	Bottle of Rouge	Juan J. Hernandez	Bob Baffert	Natalie J. Baffert	1 m	1:35.82
2025	Runnin N Gunnin	Alfredo J. Juarez, Jr.	Steven M. Asmussen	Douglas Scharbauer	1 m	1:40.09
2024	Recharge	Joel Rosario	Steven M. Asmussen	Winchell Thoroughbreds	1 m	1:37.27
2023	Flying Connection	Alfredo J. Juarez, Jr.	Todd W. Fincher	Brad King, Randy Andrews, Chris G. Coleman, Jim Cone, Suzanne Kirby & Lee Lewis	1-1/16 m	1:43.90
2022	Cleopatras Charge	Jorge Carreno	Gary W. Cross	Samuel F. Henderson	1-1/16 m	1:46.33
2021	Race not held					
2020	Race not held					
2019	Chasing Yesterday	Drayden Van Dyke	Bob Baffert	Summer Wind Equine (Jane Lyon)	1-1/16 m	1:43.18
2018	Blamed	Ken S. Tohill	Joel H. Marr	Cleber Massey	1-1/16 m	1:43.32
2017	Ghalia	José Ortiz	Todd A. Pletcher	Sumaya U.S. Stable	1-1/16 m	1:44.24
2016	Race not held					
2015	Maybellene	Victor Espinoza	Bob Baffert	Natalie J. Baffert	1-1/16 m	1:42.90
2014	Awesome Baby	Mike E. Smith	Bob Baffert	Kaleem Shah, Inc.	1-1/16 m	1:43.80
2013	Midnight Lucky	Rafael Bejarano	Bob Baffert	Karl Watson, Mike Pegram & Paul Weitman	1-1/16 m	1:41.06
2012	Princess Arabella	Martin Garcia	Bob Baffert	Peachtree Stable (John P. Fort)	1-1/16 m	1:43.52
2011	Plum Pretty	Martin Garcia	Bob Baffert	Peachtree Stable (John P. Fort)	1-1/16 m	1:43.18
2010	Harissa	Tyler Baze	David Hofmans	Gem, Inc.	1-1/16 m	1:42.90
2009	Gabby's Golden Gal	Victor Espinoza	Bob Baffert	Arnold Zetcher	1-1/16 m	1:43.31
2008	Sky Mom	Garrett Gomez	Steven M. Asmussen	Heather Stark	1-1/16 m	1:44.50
2007	Tough Tiz's Sis	Victor Espinoza	Bob Baffert	Watson and Weitman Performances, LLC	1-1/16 m	1:45.18
2006	Sweet Fourty	Victor Espinoza	Jeffrey L. Mullins	Michael House	1-1/16 m	1:43.73
2005	Cee's Irish	Corey Nakatani	Douglas F. O'Neill	Merv Griffin Ranch Co.	1-1/16 m	1:44.66
2004	Speedy Falcon	Ricardo Jaime	Henry Dominguez	Chris G. Coleman	1 m	1:36.57
2003	Island Fashion	Ignacio Puglisi	Nick Canani	Everest Stable, Inc.	1 m	1:36.29
2002	No Turbulence	Daryl Montoya	J. Eric Kruljac	Frank Lewkowitz, Dennis Grenier & Noreen Grenier	1 m	1:38.11
2001	Gems and Gold	Daryl Montoya	Ramon Gonzalez	Anthony J. Trujillo & Aimee Trujillo	1 m	1:38.60

== See also ==
- Road to the Kentucky Oaks
