= Rachel Alexandra Stakes =

- Class: Grade II
- Location: Fair Grounds Race Course; New Orleans, Louisiana, United States
- Inaugurated: 1982 (as Davona Dale Stakes)
- Race type: Thoroughbred – Flat racing
- Sponsor: Fasig-Tipton (since 2020)
- Website: Fair Grounds

Race information
- Distance: 1 1/16 miles
- Surface: Dirt
- Track: left-handed
- Qualification: Three-year-old fillies
- Weight: 122 lbs.
- Purse: $300,000 (since 2021)
- Bonuses: Qualification points – Road to the Kentucky Oaks.

The Rachel Alexandra Stakes is a Grade II American Thoroughbred horse race for three-year-old fillies at a distance of one and one sixteenth miles on the dirt run annually in February at Fair Grounds Race Course in New Orleans, Louisiana. The event currently offers a purse of $300,000.

== History ==
The inaugural running of the event was on 6 March 1982 as the Davona Dale Stakes over a distance of one mile and forty yards and was won by Windfields Farm's Laura North who was trained by US Hall of Fame trainer Grover G. Delp and ridden by jockey Ronald Franklin in a time of 1:42 4/5.

The event was named in honor of Calumet Farm's champion homebred filly Davona Dale, foaled in 1976 was U.S. Champion Three-Year-Old Filly after winning the Grade I Kentucky Oaks and sweeping the New York Triple Tiara series: the Acorn Stakes, the Mother Goose Stakes, and the Coaching Club American Oaks. Davona Dale was inducted into the National Museum of Racing and Hall of Fame in 1985. Today Davona Dale continues to have an event named for her as the GII Davona Dale Stakes at Gulfstream Park in Hallandale Beach, Florida.

The event became a preparatory event for the Fair Grounds Oaks and was scheduled after the Thelma Stakes (today known as the Letellier Memorial Stakes for two-year-olds held in December) which was run over the six-furlong distance.

In 1985 the distance of the event was increased to one and one sixteenth miles and the winner Marshua's Echelon also was victorious in winning both the Thelma Stakes and the Fair Grounds Oaks.

The following year Tiffany Lass repeated Marshua's Echelon achievements and then continued with her undefeated streak winning the GI Fantasy Stakes at Oaklawn Park and the GI Kentucky Oaks. Although Tiffany Lass would not race in the second half of 1986 her performances were substantial enough to land her U.S. Champion Three-Year-Old Filly honors for the year.

In 1999 the American Graded Stakes Committee upgraded the classification of the event to Grade III. For the first running as a graded event, the US Champion Two-Year-Old Filly and Breeders' Cup Juvenile Fillies winner Silverbulletday from 1998 entered and began her three-year-old campaign in the event. Starting at short odds of 1/10 Silverbulletday faced seven other fillies and won the event by 2 1/4 lengths. Silverbulletday would go on to win another seven more events of which four were Grade I and be crowned US Champion Three-Year-Old Filly of 1999.

In 2001, a year after Silverbulletday retired Fair Grounds track administration renamed the event to the Silverbulletday Stakes.

In 2002 running of the event Take Charge Lady equaled the track record in winning by 8 1/2 lengths in a time of 1:42.09.

In 2003 the event was upgraded to Grade II status but this only was until 2005 when it was downgraded back to Grade III.

Due to the catastrophic damage caused by of Hurricane Katrina to the Fair Ground Race Course in 2005 the event was held at Louisiana Downs in 2006.

In 2010 Fair Grounds track administration renamed the event again to the Rachel Alexandra Stakes in honor of the 2009 American Horse of the Year, Rachel Alexandra. Rachel Alexandra had won the Fair Grounds Oaks in 2009 during her exceptional campaign that won her the Eclipse Award.

In 2016 the event was upgraded from Grade III to Grade II status. In 2020, the purse was increased to $300,000.

The Rachel Alexandra Stakes is part of the Road to the Kentucky Oaks and has produced multiple winners of that race, including Monomoy Girl (2018), Serengeti Empress (2019) and Good Cheer (2025).

== Records ==
Speed record:

- 1 1/16 miles: 1:42.09 – Take Charge Lady (2002)

Margins:

- 11 lengths – Out of the Bid (1987)

Most wins by a jockey:

- 3 - Kenneth Bourque (1984, 1987, 1991)
- 3 - Ronald Ardoin (1993, 1994, 1998)
- 3 - Florent Geroux (2015, 2018, 2022)

Most wins by a trainer:

- 6 - Steven Asmussen (2005, 2007, 2009, 2014, 2020, 2021)

Most wins by an owner:

- 4 - Winchell Thoroughbreds (2005, 2009, 2014, 2020)
- 4 - Godolphin (2023, 2024, 2025, 2026)

Rachel Alexandra Stakes – Fair Grounds Oaks double:

- Marshua's Echelon †(1985), Tiffany Lass †(1986), Prospectors Delite †(1992), Blushing K. D. †(1997), Silverbulletday †(1999), Shawnee Country ‡(2000), Take Charge Lady ‡(2002), Summerly ‡(2005), Untapable (2014), I'm a Chatterbox (2015), Farrell (2017), Good Cheer (2025)

Notes:
† Rachel Alexandra Stakes was known as the Davona Dale Stakes
‡ Rachel Alexandra Stakes was known as the Silverbulletday Stakes

== Winners ==
Year	Winner	Jockey	Trainer	Owner	Distance	Time	Purse	Grade	Ref
At Fair Grounds – Rachel Alexandra Stakes
2026	Bella Ballerina	Tyler Gaffalione	Brendan P. Walsh	Godolphin Racing	1 1/16 miles	1:43.38	$289,000	II	
2025	Good Cheer	Luis Saez	Brad H. Cox	Godolphin Racing	1 1/16 miles	1:44.12	$282,000	II	
2024	Tarifa	Flavien Prat	Brad H. Cox	Godolphin Racing	1 1/16 miles	1:45.28	$291,000	II	
2023	Pretty Mischievous	Tyler Gaffalione	Brendan Walsh	Godolphin Racing	1 1/16 miles	1:45.15	$291,000	II	
2022	Turnerloose	Florent Geroux	Brad H. Cox	Ike & Dawn Thrash	1 1/16 miles	1:44.22	$300,000	II	
2021	Clairiere	Joseph Talamo	Steven M. Asmussen	Stonestreet Stables	1 1/16 miles	1:45.34	$300,000	II	
2020	Finite	Ricardo Santana Jr.	Steven M. Asmussen	Winchell Thoroughbreds, Thomas J. Reiman, William Dickson & Deborah A. Easter	1 1/16 miles	1:43.97	$294,000	II	
2019	Serengeti Empress	James Graham	Thomas M. Amoss	Joel Politi	1 1/16 miles	1:44.74	$198,000	II	
2018	Monomoy Girl	Florent Geroux	Brad H. Cox	Micheal Dubb, Monomoy Stables, Elkstone Group & Bethlehem Stables	1 1/16 miles	1:43.26	$196,000	II	
2017	Farrell	Channing Hill	Wayne M. Catalano	Coffeepot Stables	1 1/16 miles	1:44.09	$196,000	II	
2016	Venus Valentine	Corey J. Lanerie	Thomas M. Amoss	Rosemont Farm	1 1/16 miles	1:45.24	$200,000	II	
2015	I'm a Chatterbox	Florent Geroux	J. Larry Jones	Carolyn & Fletcher Gray	1 1/16 miles	1:44.10	$175,000	III	
2014	Untapable	Rosie Napravnik	Steven M. Asmussen	Winchell Thoroughbreds	1 1/16 miles	1:43.64	$196,000	III	
2013	Unlimited Budget	Rosie Napravnik	Todd A. Pletcher	Repole Stable	1 1/16 miles	1:45.38	$200,000	III	
2012	Summer Applause	Robby Albarado	W. Bret Calhoun	Gillian S. Campbell, R Group & Greenwood Lodge Farm	1 1/16 miles	1:43.30	$194,000	III	
2011	Kathmanblu	Julien R. Leparoux	Kenneth G. McPeek	Five D Thoroughbreds & Wind River Stables	1 1/16 miles	1:45.13	$147,000	III	
Silverbulletday Stakes
2010	Jody Slew	Miguel Mena	W. Bret Calhoun	Martin Racing Stable & Dan Morgan	1 1/16 miles	1:45.80	$145,500	III	
2009	War Echo	Shaun Bridgmohan	Steven M. Asmussen	Winchell Thoroughbreds	1 1/16 miles	1:45.20	$150,000	III	
2008	Indian Blessing	Garrett K. Gomez	Bob Baffert	Patti & Hal J. Earnhardt III	1 1/16 miles	1:43.75	$196,000	III	
2007	Appealing Zophie	John R. Velazquez	Steven M. Asmussen	Heiligbrodt Racing Stable	1 1/16 miles	1:44.13	$200,000	III	
At Louisiana Downs
2006	Baghdaria	M. Clifton Berry	W. Bret Calhoun	Wayne Sanders & Larry Hirsch	1 1/16 miles	1:46.07	$269,200	III	
At Fair Grounds
2005	Summerly	Donnie Meche	Steven M. Asmussen	Winchell Thoroughbreds	1 1/16 miles	1:43.79	$150,000	III	
2004	Shadow Cast	Robby Albarado	Neil J. Howard	William S. Farish III	1 1/16 miles	1:46.82	$150,000	II	
2003	Belle of Perintown	Calvin H. Borel	Eddie Kenneally	Kenneth Mahler & Jamie Schloss	1 1/16 miles	1:44.48	$150,000	II	
2002	Take Charge Lady	Jon Court	Kenneth G. McPeek	Select Stable	1 1/16 miles	1:42.09	$150,000	III	
2001	Lakenheath	Corey J. Lanerie	Gene A. Cilio	James B. Tafel	1 1/16 miles	1:46.09	$125,000	III	
Davona Dale Stakes
2000	Shawnee Country	Donnie Meche	D. Wayne Lukas	Overbrook Farm	1 1/16 miles	1:45.11	$125,000	III	
1999	Silverbulletday	Gary L. Stevens	Bob Baffert	Michael E. Pegram	1 1/16 miles	1:44.36	$125,000	III	
1998	Cool Dixie	Ronald D. Ardoin	Louie J. Roussel III	Louie J. Roussel III	1 1/16 miles	1:43.38	$125,000	Listed	
1997	Blushing K. D.	Lonnie Meche	Sam B. David Jr.	James P. & Sue V. Burns	1 1/16 miles	1:42.48	$100,000	Listed	
1996	Up Dip	Curt C. Bourque	Albert Stall Jr.	Mike G. Rutherford	1 1/16 miles	1:44.61	$62,725	Listed	
1995	§ Legendary Priness	Christopher A. Emigh	Louie J. Roussel III	Louie J. Roussel III	1 1/16 miles	1:44.42	$43,125		
1994	Playcaller	Ronald D. Ardoin	Thomas M. Amoss	Mike G. Rutherford	1 1/16 miles	1:44.31	$51,823	Listed	
1993	Bright Penny	Ronald D. Ardoin	William Badgett Jr.	Arthur I. Appleton	1 1/16 miles	1:44.80	$31,825		
1992	Prospectors Delite	Bobby J. Walker Jr.	Neil J. Howard	William S. Farish III, James Elkins & Temple Webber, Jr.	1 1/16 miles	1:43.80	$31,700		
1991	Nalees Pin	Kenneth Bourque	Larry Robideaux Jr.	George Waggoner	1 1/16 miles	1:46.50	$31,775		
1990	Windansea	Randy Romero	Lee J. Rossi	Carl Maggio	1 1/16 miles	1:46.40	$27,600		
1989	Exquisite Mistress	Calvin H. Borel	Joseph E. Broussard	Joe Ladnier & Carson Kimbrough	1 1/16 miles	1:46.80	$26,675		
1988	False Glitter	Shane P. Romero	Louie J. Roussel III	Louie J. Roussel III	1 1/16 miles	1:47.40	$28,450		
1987	Out of the Bid	Kenneth Bourque	Bud Delp	Hawksworth Farm	1 1/16 miles	1:47.20	$37,900		
1986	Tiffany Lass	Ricky Frazier	Lazaro S. Barrera	Aaron U. Jones	1 1/16 miles	1:46.00	$39,900		
1985	Marshua's Echelon	Ronald J. Franklin	Noxie Romano Jr.	Joe & Jean Pizzitola	1 1/16 miles	1:45.20	$47,250		
1984	Texas Cowgirl Nite	Kenneth Bourque	Ken W. Delahoussaye	Charley S. Staples	1 mile & 40 yards	1:42.00	$29,050		
1983	Duped	Julio C. Espinoza	Donald R. Winfree	James J. Devaney	1 mile & 40 yards	1:43.00	$23,500		
1982	Linda North	Ronald J. Franklin	Bud Delp	Windfields Farm	1 mile & 40 yards	1:42.80	$22,950		

Notes:
§ Ran as an entry

== See also ==
- List of American and Canadian Graded races
- Road to the Kentucky Oaks
