= Kentucky Oaks top three finishers =

This is a listing of the horses that finished in either first, second, or third place and the number of starters in the Kentucky Oaks, the first leg of the de facto American Triple Tiara of Thoroughbred Racing, an American Grade 1 race for three-year-old fillies at 1 1/8 miles (9 furlongs) on the dirt held at Churchill Downs in Louisville, Kentucky.

Year	Winner	Second	Third	Starters
2026	Always a Runner	Meaning	Counting Stars	13
2025	Good Cheer	Drexel Hill	Bless The Broken	13
2024	Thorpedo Anna	Just F Y I	Regulatory Risk	14
2023	Pretty Mischievous	Gambling Girl	The Alys Look	14
2022	Secret Oath	Nest	Desert Dawn	14
2021	Malathaat	Search Results	Will's Secret	13
2020	Shedaresthedevil	Swiss Skydiver	Speech	9
2019	Serengeti Empress	Liora	Lady Apple	14
2018	Monomoy Girl	Wonder Gadot	Midnight Bisou	14
2017	Abel Tasman	Daddys Lil Darling	Lockdown	14
2016	Cathryn Sophia	Land Over Sea	Lewis Bay	14
2015	Lovely Maria	Shook Up	I'm a Chatterbox	14
2014	Untapable	My Miss Sophia	Unbridled Forever	12
2013	Princess of Sylmar	Beholder	Unlimited Budget	10
2012	Believe You Can	Broadway's Alibi	Grace Hall	14
2011	Plum Pretty	St. John's River	Zazu	13
2010	Blind Luck	Evening Jewel	Tidal Pool	14
2009	Rachel Alexandra	Stone Legacy	Flying Spur	7
2008	Proud Spell	Little Belle	Pure Clan	10
2007	Rags to Riches	Octave	High Heels	14
2006	Lemons Forever	Ermine	Wait A While	14
2005	Summerly	In the Gold	Gallant Secret	7
2004	Ashado	Island Sand	Madcap Escapade	11
2003	Bird Town	Santa Catarina	Yell	12
2002	Farda Amiga	Take Charge Lady	Habibti	9
2001	Flute	Real Cozy	Collect Call	13
2000	Secret Status	Rings A Chime	Classy Cara	14
1999	Silverbulletday	Dreams Gallore	Sweeping Story	7
1998	Keeper Hill	Banshee Breeze	Really Polish	13
1997	Blushing K.D.	Tomisue's Delight	Storm Song	9
1996	Pike Place Dancer	Escena	Cara Rafaela	6
1995	Gal In A Ruckus	Urbane	Sneaky Quiet	8
1994	Sardula	Lakeway	Dianes Halo	7
1993	Dispute	Eliza	Quinpool	11
1992	Luv Me Luv Me Not	Pleasant Stage	Prospectors Delite	6
1991	Lite Light	Withallprobability	Til Forbid	10
1990	Seaside Attraction	Go For Wand	Bright Candles	10
1989	Open Mind	Imaginary Lady	Blondeinamotel	5
1988	Goodbye Halo	Jeanne Jones	Willa on the Move	10
1987	Buryyourbelief	Hometown Queen	Super Cook	8
1986	Tiffany Lass	Life at the Top	Family Style	12
1985	Fran's Valentine	Foxy Deen	Rascal Lass	9
1984	Lucky Lucky Lucky	Miss Oceana	My Darling One	6
1983	Princess Rooney	Bright Crocas	Bemissed	7
1982	Blush With Pride	Before Dawn	Flying Partner	7
1981	Heavenly Cause	De La Rose	Wayward Lass	6
1980	Bold 'n Determined	Mighty Lively	Honest and True	8
1979	Davona Dale	Himalayan	Prize Spot	6
1978	White Star Line	Grenzen	Bold Rendezvous	11
1977	Sweet Alliance	Our Mims	Mrs. Warren	12
1976	Optimistic Gal	Comfort Zone	Carmelita Gibbs	7
1975	Sun and Snow	Funalon	Funny Cat	11
1974	Quaze Quilt	Special Team	Kaye's Commander	14
1973	Bag of Tunes	La Prevoyante	Coraggioso	13
1972	Susan's Girl	Barely Even	Fairway Flyer	7
1971	Silent Beauty	Graffiti	At Arms Length	9
1970	Lady Vi-E	Glenary	Artists Proof	10
1969	Hail to Patsy	Double Delta	Mrs. Jo Jo	
1968	Dark Mirage	Miss Ribot	Lady Tramp	
1967	Nancy Jr.	Gay Sailorette	Furl Sail	
1966	Native Street	Lady Pitt	Naidni Diam	
1965	Amerivan	Gold Digger	Terentia	
1964	Blue Norther	Miss Cavandish	Road to Romance	
1963	Sally Ship	Bonnie's Girl	Power to Strike	
1962	Cicada	Flaming Page	Fortunate Isle	
1961	My Portrait	Play Time	Times Two	
1960	Make Sail	Quaze	Airmans Guide	
1959	Wedlock	Indian Maid	Kathy H.	
1959	Hidden Talent	Ray's Fairy Gold	Aesthetic	
1958	Bug Brush	Galarullah	Hasty Doll	
1957	Lori-El	Pillow Talk	Dale's Delight	
1956	Princess Turia	Doubledogdare	Tournure	
1955	Lalun	Lea Lane	Mazza	
1954	Fascinator	Queen Hopeful	Blue Violin	
1953	Bubbley	Cerise Reine	Arab Actress	
1952	Real Delight	Whirla Lea	Big Mo	
1951	How	Astro	Sickle's Image	
1950	Ari's Mona	Wondring	Diamond Lane	
1949	Wistful	The Fat Lady	Lady Dorimar	
1948	Challe Anne	Reigh Belle	Back Talk	
1947	Blue Grass	Cosmic Missile	Mother	
1946	First Page	Athenia	Buzzaround	
1945	Come and Go	On-Your-Toes	Miss Blindfold	
1944	Canina	Harriet Sue	Paddle	
1943	Nellie L	Valdina Marl	Edie Jane	
1942	Miss Dogwood	Questvive	Miss Glamour	
1941	Valdina Myth	Silvestra	Mystery Marvel	
1940	Inscolassie	June Bee	Shine O' Night	
1939	Flying Lill	Bala Ormont	Rude Awakening	
1938	Flying Lee	Janice	Fantine	
1937	Mars Shield	Shatterproof	Alkit	
1936	Two Bob	Threadneedle	Seventh Heaven	
1935	Paradisical	Mid Victorian	Spanish Babe	
1934	Fiji	Far Star	Penncote	
1933	Barn Swallow	At Top	Bright Bubble	
1932	Suntica	I Say	Depression	
1931	Cousin Jo	Sunny Lassie	Town Limit	
1930	Alcibiades	Rich Widow	Galaday	
1929	Rose of Sharon	Lady Broadcast	Current	
1928	Easter Stockings	Pink Lily	Reveries' Girl	
1927	Mary Jane	Handy Mandy	Fresco	
1926	Black Maria	Dark Phantom	Helen's Babe	
1925	Deeming	Buckwheat Cake	Litle Visitor	
1924	Princess Doreen	Nellie Morse	Befuddle	
1923	Untidy	Sweetheart	Gadfly	
1922	Startle	Martha Fallon	Precious Lula	
1921	Nancy Lee	Prudery	Lady Madcap	
1920	Lorraine	Truly Rural	Dresden	
1919	Lillian Shaw	Milkmaid	Dancing Spray	
1918	Viva America	Fern Handley	Mistress Polly	
1917	Sunbonnet	Diamond	Battle	
1916	Kathleen	Mandy Hamilton	Lady Always	
1915	Waterblossom	One Step	Lady Rotha	
1914	Bronzewing	Casuarina	Bracktown Belle	
1913	Cream	Floral Park	Gowell	
1912	Flamma	Floral Day	Beautiful	
1911	Bettie Sue	Princess Callaway	Iima	
1910	Samaria	Foxy Mary	My Gal	
1909	Floreal	Pink Wings	Cordova	
1908	Ellen-a-Dale	Boema	Estrada	
1907	Wing Ting	Altuda	Little Turner	
1906	King's Daughter	Lady Navarre	Lady Anne	
1905	Janeta	Mum	Sis Lee	
1904	Audience	Outcome	White Plume	
1903	Lemco	Mary Lavana	The Crisis	
1902	Wainamoinen	Marque	Autumn Leaves	
1901	Lady Schorr	Isobel	Edith Q.	
1900	Etta	Scarlet Lily	Cleora	
1899	Rush	May Hempstead	The Lady in Blue	
1898	Crocket	Lennep	Alleviate	
1897	White Frost	Rosinante	Taluca	
1896	Soufflé	Myrtle Harkness	La Gascoyne	
1895	Voladora	Alabama	Kathryn	
1894	Selika	Charity	Shuttle	
1893	Monrovia	Elizabeth L.	Joanna	
1892	Miss Dixie	Unadilla	Greenwich	
1891	Miss Hawkins	Ethel	Bonnie Bird	
1890	English Lady	Marie K.	none	
1889	Jewel Ban	Bandolette	Retrieve	
1888	Ten Penny	Los Angeles	Quindaro Bell	
1887	Florimore	Wary	Bannail	
1886	Pure Rye	Red Girl	Ada D.	
1885	Lizzie Dwyer	Constellation	Exile	
1884	Modesty	Highflight	Bluette	
1883	Vera	Orange Blossom	Billetta	
1882	Katie Creel	Pinafore	Issie	
1881	Lucy May	Belle of the Highlands	Mrs. Chubbs	
1880	Longitude	Bye and Bye	Ersilia	
1879	Liahtunah	Ada Glenn	Buckden Lass	
1878	Belle of Nelson	Buena Vista	Fortuna	
1877	Felicia	Bradamante	Aunt Betsy	
1876	Necy Hale	Plenty	Lady Clipper	
1875	Vinaigrette	Gyptis	Elemi	

== See also ==
- Kentucky Derby top four finishers
- List of graded stakes at Churchill Downs
