= Bourbonette Oaks =

- Class: Grade III
- Location: Turfway Park; Florence, Kentucky, United States
- Inaugurated: 1983
- Race type: Thoroughbred – Flat racing
- Website: www.turfway.com

Race information
- Distance: 1 1/16 mile (8.5 furlongs)
- Surface: Tapeta
- Track: left-handed
- Qualification: Three-year-old fillies
- Weight: Assigned
- Purse: US$100,000

The Bourbonette Oaks Stakes is an American Thoroughbred horse race held annually at Turfway Park at Florence, Kentucky. Open to three-year-old fillies, the event is contested on Tapeta over a distance of one mile (8 furlongs). The race is a Grade III event with a purse of $150,000 and has been a prep race to the Triple Tiara of Thoroughbred Racing, including the Kentucky Oaks, the Black-Eyed Susan Stakes and Mother Goose Stakes.

Run during the third week of March, the Bourbonette Oaks currently offers a purse of $100,000.

Inaugurated in 1983, the race was run in two divisions in 1983, 1985, 1988 and 1990. In 1986, it was run in three divisions.

== Records ==
Speed record

- 1:40.80 – Preach (1992)

Most wins by a jockey

- 6 – Pat Day (1987, 1989, 1990, 1994, 2001, 2002)

Most wins by a trainer

- 5 – Mark E. Casse (1983, 1986, 1990, 2006, 2007)

Most wins by an owner

- 2 – Taylor Asbury (1983, 1988)
- 2 – Claiborne Farm (1992, 2000)

== Winners ==
| Year | Winner | Jockey | Trainer | Owner | Time |
|---|---|---|---|---|---|
| 2023 | Botanical | Chris Landeros | Brad H. Cox | LNJ Foxwoods & Clearsky Farms | 1:44.47 |
| 2022 | Candy Raid | Rafael Bejarano | Keith Desormeaux | Don't Tell My Wife Stables & J. Keith Desormeaux | 1:42.96 |
| 2021 | Adventuring | Florent Geroux | Brad H. Cox | Godolphin | 1:37.31 |
| 2020 | Queen of God | Irad Ortiz, Jr. | Michael Maker | Winners Circle Racing Stable | 1:37.77 |
| 2019 | Naughty Joker | Rafael Bejarano | Wesley Ward | Kenneth and Sarah Ramsey | 1:40.08 |
| 2018 | Go Noni Go | Tyler Gaffalione | Michael J. Maker | Three Diamonds Farm | 1:39.09 |
| 2017 | Purely a Dream | Robby Albarado | Kenneth G. McPeek | Livin the Dream Racing 2015 LLC | 1:37.40 |
| 2016 | Wonderment | Cornelio Velásquez | Kenneth G. McPeek | Magdalena Racing & Chris Sterbenz | 1:39.04 |
| 2015 | Don't Leave Me | Jose Lezcano | Malcolm Pierce | Pin Oak Stable | 1:38.60 |
| 2014 | Aurelia's Belle | Channing Hill | Wayne M. Catalano | James F. Miller | 1:38.99 |
| 2013 | Silsita | John Velazquez | Todd A. Pletcher | Eclipse Thoroughbreds Partners & Tanourin Stable | 1:38.27 |
| 2012 | In Lingerie | John Velazquez | Todd A. Pletcher | Eclipse Thoroughbred Partners & Gary Barber | 1:38.28 |
| 2011 | Summer Soiree | Gabriel Saez | J. Larry Jones | Wahoo Partners & Brereton Jones | 1:38.75 |
| 2010 | Orchestrator | Alex Solis | Kenneth G. McPeek | Koolmen Racing Stable | 1:38.29 |
| 2009 | Hot Cha Cha | James Graham | Phil Sims | Nelson McMakin | 1:38:34 |
| 2008 | Maren's Meadow | Gabriel Saez | J. Larry Jones | River Ridge Ranch | 1:38.15 |
| 2007 | Sealy Hill | Patrick Husbands | Mark E. Casse | Melnyk Racing | 1:37.51 |
| 2006 | Top Notch Lady | Robby Albarado | Mark E. Casse | Robert J. Wilson | 1:39.26 |
| 2005 | Dance Away Capote | Rafael Bejarano | H. Graham Motion | Pandora Farm | 1:37.52 |
| 2004 | Class Above | Jerry Bailey | Bob Baffert | Padua Stable | 1:37.98 |
| 2003 | Adopted Daughter † | Dean Butler | Ronny Werner | Kenneth Ramsey & Sarah Ramsey | 1:37.41 |
| 2002 | Colonial Glitter | Pat Day | Paul J. McGee | 3rd Turn Stable | 1:37.00 |
| 2001 | Sweet Nanette | Pat Day | Dallas Stewart | West Point Thoroughbreds | 1:37.40 |
| 2000 | Trip | Willie Martinez | Frank L. Brothers | Claiborne Farm | 1:36.20 |
| 1999 | Sweeping Story | Jorge Chavez | Dale L. Romans | McKee Stables Inc. | 1:37.60 |
| 1998 | Nurse Goodbody | Willie Martinez | Joe Petalino | Lazy E Racing | 1:36.00 |
| 1997 | Buckeye Search | Brian Peck | Carl Nafzger | Darby Dan Farm | 1:35.00 |
| 1996 | Clamorosa | Jerry Bailey | W. Elliott Walden | Jeffrey S. Sullivan | 1:37.00 |
| 1995 | Sherzarcat | Kent Desormeaux | Murray W. Johnson | Michael D. Riordan | 1:38.80 |
| 1994 | Private Status | Pat Day | Neil J. Howard | J. Elkins, William S. Farish III & T. Webber Jr. | 1:38.00 |
| 1993 | Sentimentaldiamond | Mark T. Johnston | Donald H. Barr | Arc B Stable | 1:38.20 |
| 1992 | Preach | Julie Krone | Claude R. McGaughey III | Claiborne Farm | 1:40.80 |
| 1991 | Saratoga Dame | Michael McDowell | Lawrence D. Hughes | Seth Bellar Trust | 1:37.00 |
| 1990 | Joannie Banannie | Pat Day | Michael W. Nance | MY Stables Inc. | 1:40.00 |
| 1990 | Apella | William Troilo | Mark E. Casse | Janice A. Heinz | 1:41.00 |
| 1989 | Gorgeous | Pat Day | Neil D. Drysdale | R. N. Clay | 1:36.20 |
| 1988 | Darien Miss | Randy Romero | George R. Arnold II | Taylor Asbury | 1:39.00 |
| 1988 | Stolie | Michael McDowell | Burk Kessinger Jr. | Ernst, Lenihan et al. | 1:40.80 |
| 1987 | Combative | Pat Day | Sam T. Ramer | F. B. Hale Jr. | 1:38.60 |
| 1986 | Pretty Sham | Frank Lovato Jr. | Mark E. Casse | Calumet Farm & R. Wilson | 1:40.20 |
| 1986 | Hail A Cab | Larry Melancon | Philip M. Hauswald | John A. Bell III | 1:40.40 |
| 1986 | Classy Carlotta | R. Fielding | Monty W. Sims | John Wallace | 1:40.00 |
| 1985 | Wealthy and Wise | Eugene Sipus Jr. | Sam T. Ramer | Parrish Hill Farm | 1:37.40 |
| 1985 | Mahalia | Clifton Schwing | Walter L. Edwards | R. M. Richards | 1:40.40 |
| 1984 | Dusty Gloves | Ángel Cordero Jr. | George R. Arnold II | Ashview Farms | 1:38.80 |
| 1983 | Feisty Belle | Jorge Velásquez | Stanley M. Riser | Taylor Asbury | 1:39.00 |
| 1983 | Push On | James McKnight | Mark E. Casse | O. J. Feiner | 1:40.80 |

* † In 2003 Golden Marlin won the race but was disqualified and set back to second.

== See also ==
- Road to the Kentucky Oaks
