= Fair Grounds Oaks =

Grade II thoroughbred horse race

- Class: Grade II
- Location: Fair Grounds Race Course, New Orleans, Louisiana, United States
- Inaugurated: 1966
- Race type: Thoroughbred – Flat racing
- Website: Fair Grounds

Race information
- Distance: 1 1/16 miles
- Surface: Dirt
- Track: Left-handed
- Qualification: Three-year-old fillies
- Weight: 122 lbs with allowances
- Purse: $400,000 (since 2019)

The Fair Grounds Oaks is a Grade II American Thoroughbred horse race for three-year-old fillies at a distance of one and one-sixteenth miles on the dirt run annually in March, usually on Louisiana Derby day at Fair Grounds Race Course in New Orleans, Louisiana. The event currently offers a purse of $400,000.

== History ==
The race was inaugurated on 19 February 1966 as the eighth event on the card where the featured event was the A. B. Letellier Memorial Handicap. The event was held on a sloppy track with Oklahoma bred Help On Way, ridden by Larry Gilligan defeating Dutch Maid with Gee Ma in third. Help On Way next start was unsuccessfully run against colts and geldings in the Arkansas Derby.

The following year in 1967 winner Furl Sail continued to win the Acorn Stakes and Mother Goose Stakes and was fourth in the Coaching Club American Oaks.

In 1977 the Fair Grounds administration made a scheduling change and ran the event a second time in December over a distance of 1 1/8 miles. In 1978 the event was run in December again with split divisions.

The track administration then reverted to a March running with the shortened distance of 1 1/16 miles but did not hold the event in 1979.

The event was first upgraded in 1982 to a Grade III race. The race was run as the Coca-Cola Fair Grounds Oaks in 1989 and 1990 with sponsorship from Coca-Cola.

In 2006 the race was cancelled due to massive damage inflicted upon Fair Grounds Race Course by Hurricane Katrina.

The race is considered a prep race to the Triple Tiara of Thoroughbred Racing, including the Kentucky Oaks, the Black-Eyed Susan Stakes and Mother Goose Stakes.

The race has produced numerous Kentucky Oaks winners, including Tiffany Lass, Blushing K. D., Silverbulletday, Ashado, Summerly, Proud Spell, Rachel Alexandra, Believe You Can and Good Cheer.

== Records ==
Speed record:

- 1 1/16 miles – 1:42.20 Blushing K. D. (1997)

Margins:

- 12 lengths – Truly Bound (1981)

Most wins by a jockey:

- 3 – Donnie Meche (1997, 2000, 2003)
- 3 – Florent Geroux (2015, 2020, 2021)

Most wins by a trainer:

- 5 - Brad H. Cox (2020, 2021, 2024, 2025, 2026)

Most wins by an owner:

- 2 - Albert M. Stall (1968, 1997)
- 2 - Winchell Thoroughbreds (2005, 2014)
- 2 - Godolphin Racing (2024, 2025)

== Winners ==
Year	Winner	Jockey	Trainer	Owner	Distance	Time	Purse	Grade	Ref
Fair Grounds Oaks
2026	Life of Joy	Flavien Prat	Brad H. Cox	Will Stroud, Andrew Farm, Mountmellick Farm & For the People Racing Stable	1 1/16 miles	1:42.27	$392,000	II	
2025	Good Cheer	Luis Saez	Brad H. Cox	Godolphin Racing	1 1/16 miles	1:43.44	$396,000	II	
2024	Tarifa	Flavien Prat	Brad H. Cox	Godolphin Racing	1 1/16 miles	1:43.24	$388,000	II	
2023	Southlawn	Reylu Gutierrez	Norm W. Casse	Robert E. Masterson	1 1/16 miles	1:44.38	$376,000	II	
2022	Echo Zulu	Joel Rosario	Steven M. Asmussen	Land N Racing & Winchell Thoroughbreds	1 1/16 miles	1:42.69	$388,000	II	
2021	Travel Column	Florent Geroux	Brad H. Cox	OXO Equine	1 1/16 miles	1:42.75	$400,000	II	
2020	Bonny South	Florent Geroux	Brad H. Cox	Juddmonte Farms	1 1/16 miles	1:43.57	$388,000	II	
2019	Street Band	Sophie Doyle	J. Larry Jones	J. Larry Jones, Cindy Jones & Ray Francis,	1 1/16 miles	1:44.54	$392,000	II	
2018	Chocolate Martini	Mitchell Murrill	Thomas M. Amoss	Double Doors Racing	1 1/16 miles	1:44.44	$293,000	II	
2017	Farrell	Channing Hill	Wayne M. Catalano	Coffeepot Stables	1 1/16 miles	1:44.09	$388,000	II	
2016	Land Over Sea	John R. Velazquez	Doug F. O'Neill	Reddam Racing	1 1/16 miles	1:44.74	$400,000	II	
2015	I'm a Chatterbox	Florent Geroux	J. Larry Jones	Carolyn & Fletcher Gray	1 1/16 miles	1:44.40	$396,000	II	
2014	Untapable	Rosie Napravnik	Steven M. Asmussen	Winchell Thoroughbreds	1 1/16 miles	1:43.09	$384,000	II	
2013	Unlimited Budget	Javier Castellano	Todd A. Pletcher	Repole Stable	1 1/16 miles	1:43.22	$490,000	II	
2012	Believe You Can	Rosie Napravnik	J. Larry Jones	Brereton C. Jones	1 1/16 miles	1:43.94	$480,000	II	
2011	Daisy Devine	James Graham	Andrew McKeever	James M. Miller	1 1/16 miles	1:44.25	$500,000	II	
2010	Quiet Temper	Robby Albarado	Dale L. Romans	Mark H. Stanley	1 1/16 miles	1:44.55	$300,000	II	
2009	Rachel Alexandra	Calvin H. Borel	Hal Wiggins	L & M Partners	1 1/16 miles	1:43.55	$400,000	II	
2008	Proud Spell	Gabriel Saez	J. Larry Jones	Brereton C. Jones	1 1/16 miles	1:44.01	$376,000	II	
2007	Mistical Plan	Corey Nakatani	Doug F. O'Neill	J. Paul Reddam	1 1/16 miles	1:44.02	$396,000	II	
2006	Race not held								
2005	Summerly	Jerry D. Bailey	Steven M. Asmussen	Winchell Thoroughbreds	1 1/16 miles	1:43.79	$300,000	II	
2004	Ashado	Cornelio Velasquez	Todd A. Pletcher	Starlight Racing	1 1/16 miles	1:43.07	$300,000	II	
2003	Lady Tak	Donnie Meche	Steven M. Asmussen	Heiligbrodt Racing	1 1/16 miles	1:44.36	$350,000	II	
2002	Take Charge Lady	Anthony J. D'Amico	Kenneth G. McPeek	Select Stable	1 1/16 miles	1:43.30	$350,000	II	
2001	Real Cozzy	Eddie Martin Jr.	Daniel C. Peitz	Robert E. & Lawana L. Low	1 1/16 miles	1:44.58	$350,000	II	
2000	Shawnee Country	Donnie Meche	D. Wayne Lukas	Overbrook Farm	1 1/16 miles	1:44.81	$350,000	III	
1999	Silverbulletday	Gary L. Stevens	Bob Baffert	Mike Pegram	1 1/16 miles	1:44.99	$372,900	III	
1998	Lu Ravi	Willie Martinez	Carl Bowman	Yoshio Fujita	1 1/16 miles	1:43.70	$300,000	III	
1997	Blushing K. D.	Donnie Meche	Sam B. David Jr.	James P. & Sue V. Burns	1 1/16 miles	1:42.20	$175,000	III	
1996	Bright Time	Luis Felipe Diaz	Benjamin W. Perkins Sr.	New Farm	1 1/16 miles	1:45.98	$157,550	III	
1995	§ Brushing Gloom	Jerilyn Brown	Richard W. Small	Robert E. Meyerhoff	1 1/16 miles	1:45.12	$150,000	III	
1994	Two Altazano	Kirk LeBlanc	William Stice	Harold V. Goodman	1 1/16 miles	1:42.50	$156,400	III	
1993	Silky Feather	Elvis J. Perrodin	Tony J. Richey	Stanton P. Powell	1 1/16 miles	1:44.60	$106,800	III	
1992	Prospectors Delite	Pat Day	Neil J. Howard	William S. Farish	1 1/16 miles	1:44.20	$106,650	III	
1991	Rare Pick	Patrick A. Johnson	Terry L. Mason	William H. Turner	1 1/16 miles	1:46.50	$109,400	III	
1990	Pampered Star	Shane Romero	Robert J. Frankel	Ritt Family Trust & Engelson	1 1/16 miles	1:44.60	$99,200	III	
1989	Mistaurian	Douglas Valiente	Stephen A. DiMauro	Chaus Stable	1 1/16 miles	1:44.80	$90,000	III	
1988	Quite a Gem	Elvis J. Perrodin	Frank L. Brothers	John A. Franks	1 1/16 miles	1:46.40	$90,000	III	
1987	Up the Apalachee	Mario R. Torres	George Arceneaux	John Minos Simon	1 1/16 miles	1:45.40	$100,000	III	
1986	Tiffany Lass	Ricky Frazier	Angel Barrera	Aaron U. Jones	1 1/16 miles	1:45.00	$166,400	III	
1985	Marshua's Echelon	Ronnie Franklin	Noxie Romano Jr.	Joseph Pizzatola	1 1/16 miles	1:44.80	$182,400	III	
1984	My Darling One	Chris McCarron	Laz Barrera	Dolly Green	1 1/16 miles	1:44.60	$170,000	III	
1983	Bright Crocus	Sandy Hawley	Adrian J. Maxwell	W. Levan, B. Walters & L. Weston	1 1/16 miles	1:45.80	$114,000	III	
1982	Before Dawn	Jorge Velasquez	John M. Veitch	Calumet Farm	1 1/16 miles	1:45.40	$113,000	III	
1981	Truly Bound	Bill Shoemaker	Bud Delp	Windfields Farm	1 1/16 miles	1:44.80	$108,400		
1980	Honest and True	Alonzo Guajardo	Larry Robideaux Jr.	Jessica G. Bell	1 1/16 miles	1:44.40	$56,375		
1979	Race not held								
1978	La Doree (ARG)	Bryan Fann	Louie J. Roussel III	Earl Schieb	1 1/8 miles	1:52.40	$38,487		Division 1
1978	Shadycroft Lady	Ruben Martinez Jr.	Robert E. Prather	Mary L. Tobin	1 1/8 miles	1:52.60	$37,387		Division 2
1977 (Dec)	Table The Rumor	Bill Shoemaker	Frank L. Brothers	Albert M. Stall Sr. & Jack Van Berg	1 1/8 miles	1:52.40	$90,300		
1977 (Mar)	Quid Kit	Angelo Jean Trosclair	S. Allen King Jr.	Adele W. Paxson	1 1/16 miles	1:45.60	$34,525		
1976	Bronze Point	Heriberto Arroyo	Harry Trotsek	Howard B. Noonan	1 1/16 miles	1:44.40	$34,250		
1975	Lucky Leslie	Donald Brumfield	Douglas A. Dodson	Valley Farm	1 1/16 miles	1:46.60	$30,000		
1974	Bold Rosie	Phillip Rubbicco	Jere R. Smith	W. Archie Lofton	1 1/16 miles	1:46.60	$34,325		
1973	Knitted Gloves	Julio C. Espinosa	Isaac K. Mourar	Robert E. Lehmann	1 1/16 miles	1:46.00	$23,825		
1972	My Charmer	Larry Melancon	Larry Robideaux Jr.	Benjamin S. Castleman	1 1/16 miles	1:46.00	$28,350		
1971	Rosemont Bow	Kenneth Knapp	Harry Trotsek	Brightview Farm	1 1/16 miles	1:43.40	$17,675		
1970	Kay Emy	Martinez Heath	Ralph Lentini	Joseph Straus	1 1/16 miles	1:47.60	$18,825		
1969	† Royal Fillet	Leroy Moyers	W. Clayton Prickett	W. Clayton Prickett	1 1/16 miles	1:46.80	$16,600		
1968	Trapeze	Jimmy Nichols	Albert M. Stall Sr.	John C. Oxley	1 1/16 miles	1:46.20	$18,075		
1967	Furl Sail	Joe L. Lopez	John L. Winans	Mrs. Edwin K. Thomas	1 1/16 miles	1:45.20	$17,300		
1966	Help On Way	Larry Gilligan	Ronnie G. Warren	Everett Lowrance	1 1/16 miles	1:52.60	$10,000		

Notes:
§ Ran as an entry
† In the 1969 running of the event Around The Horn was first past the post but was disqualified and place second for interference in the straight and Royal Fillet was declared the winner.

== See also ==
- Road to the Kentucky Oaks
- List of American and Canadian Graded races
