= Prospectors Delite =

American-bred Thoroughbred racehorse

- Sire: Mr. Prospector
- Grandsire: Raise a Native
- Dam: Up the Flagpole
- Damsire: Hoist the Flag
- Sex: Mare
- Foaled: 1989
- Country: United States
- Colour: Chestnut
- Breeder: William S. Farish III
- Owner: William S. Farish III, James Elkins & Temple Webber, Jr.
- Trainer: Neil J. Howard
- Record: 9: 6-1-1
- Earnings: $432,953

Major wins
- Acorn Stakes (1992); Ashland Stakes (1992); Fair Grounds Oaks (1992); Davona Dale Stakes (1992)

Awards
- Kentucky Broodmare of the Year (2003)
- Last updated on 16 February 2022

Prospectors Delite (March 19, 1989 - June 21, 2001) was a Kentucky-bred Thoroughbred racehorse. Out of a Hoist the Flag mare, Up the Flagpole, and the daughter of one of the century's greatest sires, Mr. Prospector, she was a Grade 1 winner and the 2003 Kentucky Broodmare of the Year.

== Racing career ==
Prospectors Delite was a leading three-year-old female and won many of the U.S.'s most notable filly stakes, some of which include the G1 Acorn Stakes and the G1 Ashland Stakes. She also finished third in the Kentucky Oaks and became a successful broodmare.

== Breeding career ==
While Prospector's Delite was a grade one winner on the track, she is best known for her role as a broodmare. Her first foal, sired by A.P. Indy, was a Grade 1 winner and sold for $575,000 at a Keeneland July yearling sale. Tomisue's Delight eventually earned over $1,000,000, with victories in stakes races including the G1 Ruffian Handicap and the G1 Personal Ensign Handicap.

Bred back to A.P Indy, Prospector's Delite produced another stakes winner, Rock Slide, who is currently standing at stud in Woodbine, Maryland, at Shamrock Farms. Prospector's Delite also produced the European stakes winner Monashee Mountain (who was bought in a 1998 Keeneland sale for $1,000,000) and stakes winner Delta Music, who earned over $200,000.

Prospector's Delite is best known for producing the 2003 Horse of the Year, Mineshaft who earned over $2,000,000 and won the Jockey Club Gold Cup. Mineshaft currently stands at stud at Lane's End Farm. At the start of his breeding career, his fee was $100,000.

== Death ==
Prospector's Delite died in 2001 at the age of 12 after suffering complications during the birth of a Storm Cat colt. She developed laminitis and had to be put down; her newborn colt survived only three weeks after his mother's death.
