= Summerly =

Summerly may refer to:

- Jeremy Summerly, a British conductor
- Summerly (horse), Thoroughbred racehorse
- Summerly, Derbyshire
