= Cathryn Sophia =

American-bred Thoroughbred racehorse

- Sire: Street Boss
- Grandsire: Street Cry
- Dam: Sheave
- Damsire: Mineshaft
- Sex: Filly
- Foaled: April 2, 2013
- Country: United States
- Colour: Bay
- Breeder: Robert Manfuso
- Owner: Cash Is King Stable
- Trainer: John Servis
- Record: 9: 6-0-3
- Earnings: $1,229,720

Major wins
- Forward Gal Stakes (2016); Davona Dale Stakes (2016); Kentucky Oaks (2016); Princess of Sylmar Stakes (2016)

Honours
- 2016 Maryland-Bred Horse of the Year; Cathryn Sophia Stakes at Parx Racing (2019– )
- Last updated on 23 August 2023

Cathryn Sophia (foaled April 2, 2013) is a retired American Thoroughbred racehorse who won the 2016 Kentucky Oaks. After wide-margin wins on both her starts as a juvenile, the filly won the Forward Gal Stakes on her first appearance of 2016 and followed up in the Davona Dale Stakes. She sustained her first defeat when odds-on favorite for the Ashland Stakes but rebounded to win the Oaks on May 6.

== Background ==
Cathryn Sophia is a bay filly bred in Maryland by Robert Manfuso. She was sired by Street Boss, a sprinter who won the Bing Crosby Handicap and the Triple Bend Handicap in 2008. The best of his other progeny have included Rapper Dragon, Danza (Arkansas Derby) and The Quarterback (Newmarket Handicap). Cathryn Sophia's dam Sheave was an unraced daughter of the 2003 American Horse of the Year Mineshaft, and a distant female-line descendant of the 1923 Kentucky Oaks winner Untidy. Robert Manfuso also owned Belterra, grand dam of Cathryn Sophia won the G2 Golden Rod Stakes in 2001 and was second in the following year's G1 Ashland Stakes.

In September 2014 the yearling filly was consigned to the Fasig-Tipton Mid-Atlantic Eastern Fall sale and was bought for $30,000 by Charles J Zacney. She entered the ownership of the Zacney's Cash Is King Stable. Cathryn Sophia has been trained throughout her racing career by John Servis, best known as the trainer of Smarty Jones.

== Racing career ==
=== 2015: two-year-old career ===
Cathryn Sophia began her track career in a six furlong maiden race at Parx on October 30, 2015, and won by twelve and three quarter lengths from eight opponents. On December 5 she faced better opposition in the Gin Talking Stakes over seven furlongs at Laurel Park and won by more than sixteen lengths from Prognosis.

=== 2016: three-year-old career ===
Cathryn Sophia began her second season at Gulfstream Park on January 30 when she started the 1/10 favorite for the Grade II Forward Gal Stakes over seven furlong. Ridden by Joel Rosario she started slowly, but took the lead in the stretch and drew away to win by five and a half lengths from Island Saint. Four weeks later at the same track the filly was partnered by Javier Castellano in the Davona Dale Stakes and again started at long odds-on. She took the lead approaching the last quarter mile and quickly went clear of her rivals to win by seven lengths from Lewis Bay. Servis commented "I was concerned today about the distance a little bit, and obviously, the way she ran, I feel a whole lot better".

The Grade I Ashland Stakes on April 9 at Keeneland saw Cathryn Sophia matched against the Spinaway Stakes winner Rachel's Valentina and the Golden Rod Stakes winner Carina Mia in a major trial race for the Kentucky Oaks. The three market leaders engaged in a sustained struggle over the last quarter mile but were overtaken in the final strides by the late-running outsider Weep No More who won by a neck from Rachel's Valentina with Cathryn Sophia a neck further back in third place. Following the filly's defeat Servis considered dropping the filly back in trip for the seven furlong Eight Belles Stakes but decided to go for the Oaks after the likely favorite Songbird was scratched.

On May 6 Cathryn Sophia faced Weep No More and Rachel's Valentina again in the Kentucky Oaks, with the other runners including Lewis Bay, Terra Promesa (Fantasy Stakes), Land Over Sea (Fair Grounds Oaks) and Go Maggie Go (Gulfstream Park Oaks). Ridden by Castellano, she raced in fourth before switching to the outside to make her challenge on the final turn. She took the lead, went clear of the field, and won by two and three quarter lengths from Land Over Sea, with Lewis Bay a neck away in third place. She then went on to win the un-graded Princess of Sylmar Stakes on September 3 as a prep for the GI Cotillion. She finished 3rd behind champion Songbird and that years GI Acorn Stakes winner Carina Mia in the GI Cotillion Stakes. After the Cotillion Stakes Cathryn Sophia was retired.

== Breeding career ==
Offered at the 2016 Fasig-Tipton Kentucky November Sale as a racing or broodmare prospect, she sold to Tom Ryan of SF Bloodstock for $1.4 million. Cathryn Sophia was bred to Pioneerof the Nile in 2017. In 2018 she had her first foal a filly by Pioneerof the Nile.

== Pedigree ==
Pedigree of Cathryn Sophia (USA), bay filly, 2013
| Sire Street Boss (USA) 2004 | Street Cry (IRE); 1998 | Machiavellian | Mr. Prospector |
| Sire Street Boss (USA) 2004 | Street Cry (IRE); 1998 | Machiavellian | Coup de Folie |
| Sire Street Boss (USA) 2004 | Street Cry (IRE); 1998 | Helen Street | Troy |
| Sire Street Boss (USA) 2004 | Street Cry (IRE); 1998 | Helen Street | Waterway |
| Sire Street Boss (USA) 2004 | Blushing Ogygian (USA); 1994 | Ogygian | Damascus |
| Sire Street Boss (USA) 2004 | Blushing Ogygian (USA); 1994 | Ogygian | Gonfalon |
| Sire Street Boss (USA) 2004 | Blushing Ogygian (USA); 1994 | Fruhlingshochzeit | Blushing Groom |
| Sire Street Boss (USA) 2004 | Blushing Ogygian (USA); 1994 | Fruhlingshochzeit | Fruhlingstag |
| Dam Sheave (USA) 2009 | Mineshaft (USA); 1999 | A.P. Indy | Seattle Slew |
| Dam Sheave (USA) 2009 | Mineshaft (USA); 1999 | A.P. Indy | Weekend Surprise |
| Dam Sheave (USA) 2009 | Mineshaft (USA); 1999 | Prospectors Delite | Mr. Prospector |
| Dam Sheave (USA) 2009 | Mineshaft (USA); 1999 | Prospectors Delite | Up the Flagpole |
| Dam Sheave (USA) 2009 | Belterra (USA); 1999 | Unbridled | Fappiano |
| Dam Sheave (USA) 2009 | Belterra (USA); 1999 | Unbridled | Gana Facil |
| Dam Sheave (USA) 2009 | Belterra (USA); 1999 | Cruising Haven | Shelter Half |
| Dam Sheave (USA) 2009 | Belterra (USA); 1999 | Cruising Haven | Sailing Leader (Family: 5-i) |

- Cathryn Sophia is inbred 4 × 4 to Mr. Prospector, meaning that this stallion appears twice in the fourth generation on her pedigree.
