= Pretty Mischievous =

American racehorse

- Sire: Into Mischief
- Grandsire: Harlan's Holiday
- Dam: Pretty City Dancer
- Damsire: Tapit
- Sex: Mare
- Foaled: March 30, 2020 (age 6)
- Country: United States
- Colour: Bay
- Breeder: Godolphin
- Owner: Godolphin
- Trainer: Brendan P. Walsh
- Record: 12: 7 - 2 - 3
- Earnings: $2,104,560

Major wins
- Rachel Alexandra Stakes (2023); Kentucky Oaks (2023); Acorn Stakes (2023); Test Stakes (2023)

Awards
- American Champion Three-Year-Old Filly (2023)
- Last updated on 9 June 2024

Pretty Mischievous (foaled March 30, 2020) is a Champion American Thoroughbred racehorse who in 2023 won the Grade I Kentucky Oaks and Test Stakes.

== Background ==
Pretty Mischievous is a bay mare who was bred and is owned by Godolphin in Kentucky. Pretty Mischievous is out of the Tapit mare Pretty City Dancer, dead-heat winner of the 2016 Grade I Spinaway Stakes for 2-year-old fillies at Saratoga Race Course. Michael Banahan, director of bloodstock for Godolphin in the USA noted that Godolphin had a pairing with Into Mischief in mind in going to US$3.5 million to purchase her at the 2018 Fasig-Tipton Kentucky November Sale, where she was consigned by Taylor Made Sales Agency. Stroud Coleman Bloodstock signed the ticket.

Pretty Mischievous's sire Into Mischief, stands at Spendthrift Farm in Kentucky for $250,000 (2023).

Pretty Mischievous is trained by the Irish-born trainer Brendan P. Walsh.

After a successful three-year-old campaign Pretty Mischievous was awarded Eclipse Award as the U.S. Champion Three-Year-Old Filly for 2023.

== Statistics ==
Date	Distance	Race	Grade	Track	Odds	Field	Finish	Winning Time	Winning (Losing) Margin	Jockey	Ref
2022 – Two-year-old season
Sep 18, 2022	6 1/2 furlongs	Maiden Special Weight		Churchill Downs	2.08*	12	1	1:17.17	2 1/4 lengths	Tyler Gaffalione	
Oct 30, 2022	7 furlongs	Allowance		Churchill Downs	0.38*	6	1	1:26.84	1 3/4 lengths	Tyler Gaffalione	
Nov 26, 2022	1 1/16 miles	Golden Rod Stakes	II	Churchill Downs	5.15	8	3	1:43.94	(5 1/4 lengths)	Tyler Gaffalione	
Dec 26, 2022	1 mile & 70 yards	Untapable Stakes		Fair Grounds	1.70	9	1	1:44.03	3 1/4 lengths	Brian Hernandez Jr.	
2023 – Three-year-old season
Feb 18, 2023	1 1/16 miles	Rachel Alexandra Stakes	II	Fair Grounds	8.10	6	1	1:45.34	3/4 lengths	Tyler Gaffalione	
Mar 25, 2023	1 1/16 miles	Fair Grounds Oaks	II	Fair Grounds	1.30	5	2	1:44.38	(3 1/4 lengths)	Brian Hernandez Jr.	
May 5, 2023	1 1/8 miles	Kentucky Oaks	I	Churchill Downs	10.37	14	1	1:49.77	neck	Tyler Gaffalione	
Jun 9, 2023	1 1/16 miles	Acorn Stakes	I	Belmont Park	1.90	8	1	1:43.33	head	Tyler Gaffalione	
Aug 5, 2023	7 furlongs	Test Stakes	I	Saratoga	1.85*	7	1	1:23.40 (Note: The final time of the Test Stakes was under review by Equibase after Maple Leaf Mel, who on the lead suffered a fatal injury near the end of the race and the electronic timing beam was tripped before Pretty Mischievous crossed the finish line.)	head	Tyler Gaffalione	
Sep 23, 2023	1 1/16 miles	Cotillion Stakes	I	Parx	2.10*	9	2	1:45.69	( 1/2 length)	Tyler Gaffalione	
2024 – Four-year-old season
May 3, 2024	1 1/16 miles	La Troienne Stakes	I	Churchill Downs	4.17	5	3	1:43.24	(5 1/4 lengths)	Tyler Gaffalione	
Jun 8, 2024	1 1/8 miles	Ogden Phipps Stakes	I	Saratoga	6.30	6	3	1:49.58	(4 1/2 lengths)	Tyler Gaffalione	

Notes:
An (*) asterisk after the odds means Pretty Mischievous was the post-time favourite.

== Pedigree ==
Pedigree of Pretty Mischievous, filly, March 30, 2020
Sire Into Mischief (2005)	Harlan's Holiday (1999)	Harlan (1989)	Storm Cat (1983)
Sire Into Mischief (2005)	Harlan's Holiday (1999)	Harlan (1989)	Country Romance (1976)
Sire Into Mischief (2005)	Harlan's Holiday (1999)	Christmas in Aiken (1992)	Affirmed (1975)
Sire Into Mischief (2005)	Harlan's Holiday (1999)	Christmas in Aiken (1992)	Dowager (1980)
Sire Into Mischief (2005)	Leslie's Lady (1996)	Tricky Creek (1986)	Clever Trick (1976)
Sire Into Mischief (2005)	Leslie's Lady (1996)	Tricky Creek (1986)	Battle Creek Girl (1977)
Sire Into Mischief (2005)	Leslie's Lady (1996)	Crystal Lady (CAN) (1990)	Stop The Music (1970)
Sire Into Mischief (2005)	Leslie's Lady (1996)	Crystal Lady (CAN) (1990)	One Last Bird (1980)
Dam Pretty City Dancer (2014)	Tapit (2001)	Pulpit (1994)	A.P. Indy (1989)
Dam Pretty City Dancer (2014)	Tapit (2001)	Pulpit (1994)	Preach (1989)
Dam Pretty City Dancer (2014)	Tapit (2001)	Tap Your Heels (1996)	Unbridled (1987)
Dam Pretty City Dancer (2014)	Tapit (2001)	Tap Your Heels (1996)	Ruby Slippers (1982)
Dam Pretty City Dancer (2014)	Pretty City (1998)	Carson City (1987)	Mr. Prospector (1970)
Dam Pretty City Dancer (2014)	Pretty City (1998)	Carson City (1987)	Blushing Promise (1982)
Dam Pretty City Dancer (2014)	Pretty City (1998)	Pretty Special (1977)	Riverman (1969)
Dam Pretty City Dancer (2014)	Pretty City (1998)	Pretty Special (1977)	Snobishness (1970) (family 1-x)
