= Channing Hill =

American jockey

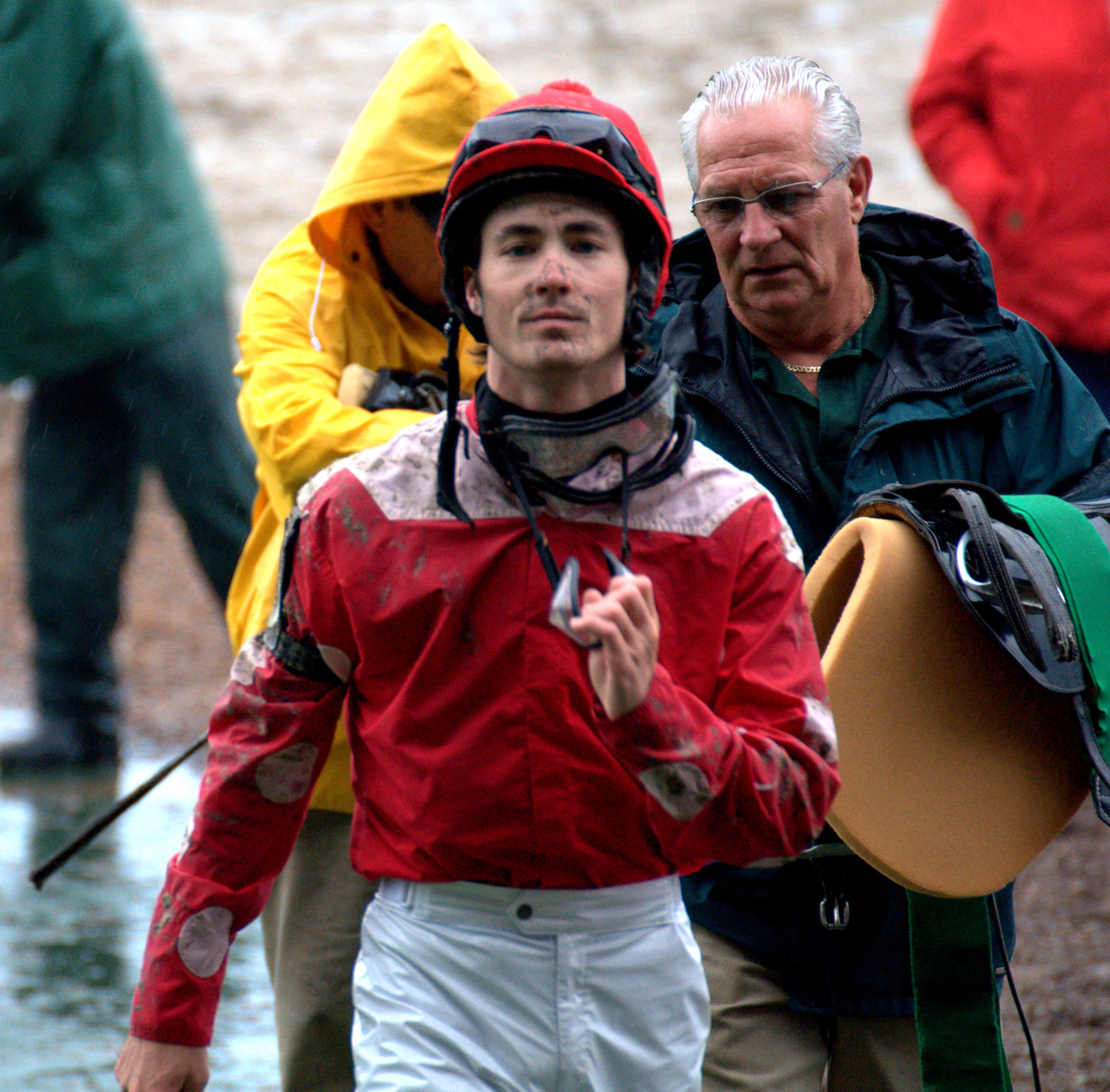
- August 2011 at Monmouth Park.

Personal information
- Born: August 22, 1987 (age 38) Grand Island, Nebraska, U.S.
- Occupation: Jockey

Horse racing career
- Sport: Horse racing
- Career wins: 1,204

Major racing wins
- New York Stallion Series (2006); New York Oaks (2006); New York Derby (2007); Pleasant Colony Stakes (2007); Barbara Fritchie Handicap (2008); Andover Way Stakes (2008); Anne Arundel Stakes (2008); Black-Eyed Susan Stakes (2008); Stuyvesant Handicap (2008); Forego Stakes (2008); Athenia Handicap (2008); Ontario Fashion Stakes (2008); Wistful Stakes (2009); Busher Stakes (2009); Oklahoma Derby (2009); Red Smith Handicap (2009); Paumonok Handicap (2010); Toboggan Handicap (2010); Ladies Handicap (2010); Seabiscuit Stakes (2010); James B. Moseley Stakes (2010); Distaff Handicap (2011); Bourbon Stakes (2013); Arlington Matron Stakes (2013); American Derby (2013); Arlington Oaks (2014); Bourbonette Oaks (2014); Fantasy Stakes (2014); Robert G. Dick Memorial Stakes (2015); Wise Dan Stakes (2016); Golden Rod Stakes (2016, 2018); Lexington Stakes (2017); Rachel Alexandra Stakes (2017); Chilukki Stakes (2017); Fair Grounds Oaks (2017); Sycamore Stakes (2018); Shuvee Stakes (2018)

Significant horses
- Sweet Vendetta, What a Pear, Farrell, Liora, Sugar Shock, Zulu Alpha, First Defence

Channing Hill (born August 22, 1987) is a retired American jockey in American Thoroughbred horse racing.

Hill began riding horses when he was 16 years old. He rode full-time at Prairie Meadows Racetrack between his junior and senior years in high school. After graduating from Columbus High School in 2005 he traveled to New York to continue his riding career. His father is longtime jockey Allan Hill who rode at Fonner Park during his four decade long racing career.

In 2005, Hill was the runner-up to Emma-Jayne Wilson in the Eclipse Award for Outstanding Apprentice Jockey voting. His first win was atop Red River Ridge in June 2004 at Prairie Meadows Racetrack. Hill currently rides for the New York and New Jersey racing circuit. Presently, and in the past few years he has been in the top 100 list for North American Racing Leaders with overall earnings and wins.

On July 10, 2010 Hill swept the two $75,000 stakes races on the 75th Anniversary Day program at Suffolk Downs in front of a crowd of 10,310.

Hill officially retired from racing on December 6th, 2022, two years after suffering a severe neck and back injury at Oaklawn Park.

== Personal life ==
Channing Hill is married to Shelbi Catalano, daughter of horse trainer Wayne Catalano.

=== Year-end charts ===
Chart (2005–present)	Peak position
National Earnings List for Jockeys 2005	41
National Earnings List for Jockeys 2006	61
National Earnings List for Jockeys 2007	51
National Earnings List for Jockeys 2008	32
National Earnings List for Jockeys 2009	67
National Earnings List for Jockeys 2010	90
National Earnings List for Jockeys 2013	81
National Earnings List for Jockeys 2014	99
