= Road to the Kentucky Oaks =

The Road to the Kentucky Oaks is a points system to qualify for the Kentucky Oaks, one of the most important races for three-year-old fillies and held the day before the Kentucky Derby at Churchill Downs. It features roughly 30 stakes races for Thoroughbred fillies between September (when the horses are age two) and April (when they are three) – the number and specific races have varied slightly over the years. The point system replaces the previous qualifying system which was based on graded stakes earnings.

== Qualifying for the Kentucky Oaks ==
If more than 14 horses wish to enter the Kentucky Oaks, positions will be reserved for the top 14 point earners from the Road to the Kentucky Oaks qualifying series. If any of the top 14 does not enter the Oaks, their position is given to the next ranked horses on the list. Up to 18 horses may enter the race, with the bottom four point-earners listed as "also eligible". If any of the top 14 is scratched after entries are taken but before betting begins, the next ranked horse on the also eligible list will be eligible to run. If two or more horses have the same number of points, the tiebreaker to get into the race will be earnings in non-restricted stakes races, whether or not they are graded. In the event of a tie, those horses will divide equally the points they would have received jointly had one beaten the other.

The series is divided into two phases, the Kentucky Oaks Prep Season and the Kentucky Oaks Championship Series. The prep season consists of races of one mile or longer that are run between September (when the fillies are age two) and February (when the fillies are age three). Points are awarded to the top 4 finishers in each race on a 10-4-2-1 scale. (Note: Starting with the 2016 series, the points for the Breeders' Cup Juvenile Fillies are doubled) The championship season consists of two legs and a "wild card" round. The first leg includes minor prep races with a 50-20-10-5 scale. The second leg includes major prep races, often Grade I, with a 100-40-20-10 scale. The "wild card" consists of one race and has a 10-4-2-1 scale. Fillies who earn points as part of the Road to the Kentucky Derby will be credited with them as part of the Road to the Kentucky Oaks. However, points on the Road to the Kentucky Oaks are not credited towards qualifying for the Derby.

The Super Six Prep races are worth 100 Point Races to the winner, they include such historic races as the Santa Anita Oaks (G1) at Santa Anita Park, the Gulfstream Park Oaks (G2) at Gulfstream Park, the Ashland Stakes (G1) at Keeneland Race Course, the Fair Grounds Oaks (G2) at Fair Ground Race Course, the Gazelle Stakes (G2) at Aqueduct Racetrack and the Fantasy Stakes (G3) at Oaklawn Park.

To be eligible to run in the Kentucky Oaks, a filly must earn sufficient points via the Road to the Kentucky Oaks and the owner must pay certain fees: specifically, a nomination fee, an entry fee and a starter fee. For example, in 2016 the nomination fee was $200 which was to be paid by February 20, 2016. If the February date was missed, a late nomination fee of $1,500 could be paid by April 13, 2016. In addition, owners with qualifying horses were required to pay $5,000 to enter the Oaks and an additional $5,000 to start. If a qualifying horse was not nominated in either February or April, it could be supplemented to the Oaks for $30,000.

== History ==
The Road to the Kentucky Oaks was created in 2012 as a companion race season to the Road to the Kentucky Derby season series. The point system was created to establish a "clear, practical and understandable path" to qualify for the Kentucky Oaks, according to the official website of Churchill Downs. The previous graded stakes earning criteria were poorly understood by the public, based on a poll conducted by Churchill Downs which showed 83% of respondents stating they did not understand how horses became starters for the race.

=== 2013 series ===
The 2013 season consisted of 35 races, 20 races for the Kentucky Oaks Prep Season and 15 races for the Kentucky Oaks Championship Season.

Beholder was the leading qualifier for the 2013 Oaks, having earned a total of 164 points by winning the Breeders' Cup Juvenile (10 points), Las Virgenes (50 points) and Santa Anita Oaks (100 points), plus a 2nd-place finish in the Santa Ynez (4 points). She would finish second in the race to Princess of Sylmar, who qualified with 50 points.

=== 2014 series ===
The number of races was originally reduced to 29 for the 2014 season (15 prep races and 14 championship season races). Due to a scheduling change of Las Virgenes, the Santa Ysabel replaced its spot in the first leg of the Kentucky Oaks Championship Series. The Las Virgenes was then added as a Kentucky Oaks Prep Season race bringing the total number of races in the entire series to 30.

Untapable was both the leading qualifier for and winner of the 2014 Oaks. Untapable earned a total of 160 points by winning the Pocahontas (10 points), Rachel Alexandra (50 points) and Fair Grounds Oaks (100 points).

=== 2015 series ===
The 2015 season consisted of 31 races, 17 for the Kentucky Oaks Prep Season and 14 for the Kentucky Oaks Championship Series.

Condo Commando was the leading qualifier with 161 points, earned by winning the Demoiselle (10 points), Busher (50 points) and Gazelle (100 points), plus a fourth-place finish in the Frizette. I'm a Chatterbox also finished with 161 points, earned by winning the Silverbulletday (10 points), Rachel Alexandra (50 points) and Fair Grounds Oaks (100 points), plus finishing fourth in the Golden Rod (1 point). The Oaks was won by Lovely Maria, who qualified with 120 points, earned by winning the Ashland Stakes (100 points) and finishing second in the Rachel Alexandra (20 points).

=== 2016 series ===
For the 2016 series, the points awarded to the top 4 finishers of the Breeders Cup Juvenile Fillies were doubled to a 20-8-4-2 basis. Otherwise the series was supposed to remain the same as 2015, with 31 total races. However, due to an outbreak of equine herpesvirus at Sunland Parks, the Sunland Park Oaks was not run, reducing the number of races to 30.

Songbird was the highest ranked filly with 190 points, earned by winning the Chandelier (10 points), Juvenile Fillies (20 points), Las Virgenes (10 points), Santa Ysabel (50 points) and Santa Anita Oaks (100 points). She would have been the heavy favorite for the Oaks but developed a fever and did not race.

Cathryn Sophia, the winner of the 2016 Oaks, qualified for the race with 80 points, earned by winning the Forward Gal Stakes (10 points) and Davona Dale Stakes (50 points) plus finishing 3rd in the Ashland (20 points).

=== 2017 series ===
Churchill Downs announced the schedule for the 2017 Road to the Kentucky Oaks on September 13, 2016. The only change from the 2016 season is that the Mazarine Stakes is no longer included, bringing the total number of races down to 30.

Farrell qualified first with 170 points, earned by winning the Golden Rod, Silverbulletday, Rachel Alexandra and Fair Grounds Oaks. The Kentucky Oaks was won by Abel Tasman, who qualified with 70 points by finishing second in the Santa Ysabel and Santa Anita Oaks.

=== 2018 series ===
For 2018, Churchill Downs added the Suncoast Stakes to the series and reduced the points awarded for the Bourbonette Stakes to 20-8-4-2. The Delta Princess Stakes, which would have been the 31st race in the series, was cancelled in the aftermath of Hurricane Harvey.

=== 2021 series ===
Notes

== See also ==
- Road to the Kentucky Derby
