= Summerly (horse) =

American-bred Thoroughbred racehorse

- Sire: Summer Squall
- Grandsire: Storm Bird
- Dam: Here I Go
- Damsire: Mr. Prospector
- Sex: Filly
- Foaled: 2002
- Country: United States
- Colour: Chestnut
- Breeder: Thomas F. Van Meter & Michael Lowenbaum
- Owner: Winchell Thoroughbreds
- Trainer: Steve Asmussen
- Record: 14: 6-1-2
- Earnings: US$907,682

Major wins
- Fair Grounds Oaks (2005); Kentucky Oaks (2005); Silverbulletday Stakes(2005); Ashado Stakes (2006)

Summerly (March 31, 2002 – March 30, 2021) was an American Thoroughbred racehorse best known for winning the Grade 1 Kentucky Oaks in 2005. She was sired by 1990 Preakness Stakes winner, Summer Squall and out of the Mr. Prospector mare, Here I Go.

Summerly raced from age two through age four and was then retired. She was sold at the November 2006 Fasig-Tipton broodmare sale for $3.3 million to WinStar Farm of Versailles, Kentucky. In 2008 and again in 2009, Summerly produced a colt by Distorted Humor. She produced a colt by Tiznow named State Line. She also had a filly by Kentucky Derby winner Super Saver. In 2018, she produced a filly by Carpe Diem.

Summerly died of colic on March 30, 2021, at the age of 19.
