= Golden Rod Stakes =

- Class: Grade II
- Location: Churchill Downs; Louisville, Kentucky, United States
- Inaugurated: 1910
- Race type: Thoroughbred – Flat racing
- Website: www.churchilldowns.com

Race information
- Distance: 1 1/16 miles (8.5 furlongs)
- Surface: Dirt
- Track: left-handed
- Qualification: Two-year-old filies
- Weight: Assigned
- Purse: $400,000 (2021)

The Golden Rod Stakes is an American Thoroughbred horse race held annually in late November at Churchill Downs in Louisville, Kentucky. A Grade II event open to two-year-old fillies, it is currently contested on dirt over a distance of 1 1/16 miles (8.5 furlongs). The namesake goldenrod is the official flower of the state of Kentucky,.

== Historical notes ==
The inaugural running of the Golden Rod Stakes took place on October 20, 1910. It was established as a selling race and won by Helen Barbee. Heavy favorite Danger Mark finished sixth in the seven-horse field. It would remain a selling race until 1919 when it became the Golden Rod Handicap. For that year only it was run at one mile (8 furlongs). The Edward R. Bradley filly Busy Signal ran away from 15 competitors and won by 12 lengths. The race remained a handicap event through 1927 when it was placed on hiatus. In 1962 it was revived as the Golden Rod Stakes.

== Records ==
Speed record:

- 8.5 furlongs (1^{1}/16 miles): 1:43.08 Rachel Alexandra (2008)
- 6 furlongs: 1:12.40, Edith W. (1913)
- 7 furlongs: 1:23.60, Woozem (1966) & Levee Night (1970)

Most wins by a jockey:

- 4 – Don Brumfield (1963, 1968, 1976, 1981)
- 4 – Julien Leparoux (2007, 2010, 2015, 2017)
- Most wins by a trainer:
- 5 – D. Wayne Lukas (1990, 1994, 1996, 1997, 2003)

Most wins by an owner:

- 2 – Bwamazon Farm (1963, 1975)
- 2 – Hickory Tree Stable (1974, 1976)
- 2 – Claiborne Farm (1983, 2013)
- 2 – Overbrook Farm (1990, 1996)
- 2 – Naveed Chowhan (2004, 2012)
- 2 – Coffeepot Stables (2016, 2018)
- 2 - Godolphin (2024, 2025)

== Winners ==
Year	Winner	Age	Jockey	Trainer	Owner	Dist. (Furlongs)	Time	Win$	Grade
2025	Bella Ballerina	2	Tyler Gaffalione	Brendan P. Walsh	Godolphin LLC	8.5 F	1:43.50	$400,000	G2
2024	Good Cheer	2	Luis Saez	Brad H. Cox	Godolphin	8.5 F	1:43.26	$400,000	G2
2023	Intricate	2	Tyler Gaffalione	Brendan Walsh	Bradley Thoroughbreds, Laura Leigh Stable, Scott Estes, and Cambron Equine, LLC	8.5 F	1:45.01	$400,000	G2
2022	Hoosier Philly	2	Edgar Morales	Thomas M. Amoss	Gold Standard Racing Stable	8.5 F	1:43.94	$400,000	G2
2021	Dream Lith	2	Ramon Vasquez	Robertino Diodoro	Cypress Creek Equine and Arnold Bennewith	8.5 F	1:44.72	$240,455	G2
2018	Liora	2	Channing Hill	Wayne M. Catalano	Coffeepot Stables (Bob Cummings & Annette Bacola)	8.5 F	1:46.25	$120,280	G2
2017	Road to Victory	2	Julien Leparoux	Mark E. Casse	Gary Barber & John Oxley	8.5 F	1:43.36	$115,320	G2
2016	Farrell	2	Channing Hill	Wayne M. Catalano	Coffeepot Stables (Bob Cummings & Annette Bacola)	8.5 F	1:44.26	$115,320	G2
2015	Carina Mia	2	Julien Leparoux	William I. Mott	Three Chimneys Farm	8.5 F	1:45.42	$119,040	G2
2014	West Coast Belle	2	Shaun Bridgmohan	Wayne M. Catalano	Mary & Gary West	8.5 F	1:45.52	$132,849	G2
2013	Vexed	2	Shaun Bridgmohan	Albert Stall Jr.	Claiborne Farm & Adele Dilschneider	8.5 F	1:43.83	$99,570	G2
2012	Seaneen Girl	2	Miguel Mena	Bernard S. Flint	Naveed Chowhan	8.5 F	1:44.95	$99,726	G2
2011	On Fire Baby	2	Joe Johnson	Gary Hartiage	Anita Cauley	8.5 F	1:45.98	$99,747	G2
2010	Kathmanblu	2	Julien Leparoux	Kenneth McPeek	Five D Thoroughbreds LLC	8.5 F	1:44.48	$99,525	G2
2009	Sassy Image	2	Robby Albarado	Dale Romans	Jerry Romans Jr.	8.5 F	1:44.51	$100,772	G2
2008	Rachel Alexandra	2	Calvin Borel	Hal R. Wiggins	Dolphus C. Morrison	8.5 F	1:43.08	$99,988	G2
2007	Pure Clan	2	Julien Leparoux	Robert E. Holthus	Lewis Lakin	8.5 F	1:43.59	$166,268	G2
2006	Lady Joanne	2	John McKee	Carl Nafzger	Bentley L. Smith	8.5 F	1:44.12	$133,684	G2
2005	French Park	2	Mark Guidry	Helen Pitts	Stevestan Stable	8.5 F	1:47.26	$137,764	G2
2004	Runway Model	2	Eddie Martin Jr.	Bernard S. Flint	Naveed Chowhan	8.5 F	1:45.97	$133,548	G2
2003	Be Gentle	2	John McKee	D. Wayne Lukas	Thomas F. Van Meter II	8.5 F	1:45.91	$142,600	G2
2002	My Boston Gal	2	Calvin Borel	Carl Nafzger	Stoneledge Racing et al.	8.5 F	1:45.00	$136,152	G2
2001	Belterra	2	Jon Court	Carl Nafzger	Robert T. Manfuso	8.5 F	1:43.82	$133,424	G2
2000	Miss Pickums	2	Justin Vitek	Paul J. McGee	Siegel family	8.5 F	1:48.84	$138,384	G2
1999	Humble Clerk	2	Jon Court	Niall M. O'Callaghan	Gary A. Tanaka	8.5 F	1:45.26	$138,880	G3
1998	Silverbulletday	2	Gary Stevens	Bob Baffert	Michael E. Pegram	8.5 F	1:43.87	$134,292	G3
1997	Love Lock	2	Robby Albarado	D. Wayne Lukas	Michael Tabor	8.5 F	1:44.49	$139,996	G3
1996	City Band	2	Shane Sellers	D. Wayne Lukas	Overbrook Farm	8.5 F	1:46.82	$139,996	G3
1995	Gold Sunrise	2	Willie Martinez	William I. Mott	Darley Stud	8.5 F	1:45.46	$97,500	G3
1994	Lilly Capote	2	Donna Barton	D. Wayne Lukas	Jim Spence	8.5 F	1:46.66	$97,500	G3
1993	At the Half	2	Pat Day	Carl E. Bowman	Wayne G. Lyster III & R. E. Crabtree	8.5 F	1:46.83	$97,500	G3
1992	Boots 'n Jackie	2	Michael Lee	Emanuel Tortora	Bee Bee Bee Stable & Toni Tortora	8.5 F	1:47.29	$97,500	G3
1991	Vivid Imagination	2	Joe Johnson	Steven L. Morguelan	Stewart Madison	8.5 F	1:46.38	$97,500	G3
1990	Fancy Ribbons	2	James Bruin	D. Wayne Lukas	Overbrook Farm	8.5 F	1:45.40	$97,500	G3
1989	De La Devil	2	Julie Krone	Woody Stephens	Henryk de Kwiatkowski	8.5 F	1:44.60	$97,500	G3
1988	Born Famous	2	Earlie Fires	Reed Combest	Clinton Lagrosa	8.5 F	1:48.20	$97,500	
1987	Darien Miss	2	Patrick Johnson	George R. Arnold II	Taylor Asbury	8.5 F	1:48.20	$83,814	
1986	Stargrass	2	Keith Allen	J. Bert Sonnier	Nelson Bunker Hunt	8.5 F	1:46.60	$98,358	
1985	Slippin N' Slyding	2	Charles Woods Jr.	David A. Logsdon	Sandra Mims	8.5 F	1:46.20	$95,693	
1984	Kamikaze Rick	2	Richard Migliore	Mark E. Casse	Flame Creek Stable	8.5 F	1:47.80	$101,156	
1983	Flippers	2	Pay Day	Steve Penrod	Claiborne Farm	8.5 F	1:47.60	$86,158	
1982	Weekend Surprise	2	Pat Day	Del W. Carroll	William S. Kilroy & William S. Farish III	8.5 F	1:47.00	$78,701	
1981	Betty Money	2	Don Brumfield	Ronnie G. Warren Jr.	Russell Michael Jr.	8.5 F	1:45.80	$91,669	
1980	Mamzelle	2	Mark Sellers	Thomas Stevens Sr.	G. Watts Humphrey Jr.	8.5 F	1:46.20	$83,236	
1979	Remote Ruler	2	Sam Maple	James E. Picou	Marcia Schott	7 F	1:25.00	$43,095	
1978	Angel Island	2	Eddie Delahoussaye	Ray Lawrence Jr.	Spendthrift Farm	7 F	1:24.20	$36,325	
1977	Bold Rendezvous	2	Paul Nicolo	James E. Morgan	John B. Bolan	7 F	1:27.00	$46,449	
1976	Bring Out the Band	2	Don Brumfield	James W. Murphy	Hickory Tree Stable	7 F	1:25.20	$39,688	
1975	Old Goat	2	Michael Hole	Anthony L. Basile	Bwamazon Farm	7 F	1:24.80	$37,941	
1974	Mirthful Flirt	2	William J. Passmore	James W. Murphy	Hickory Tree Stable	7 F	1:26.60	$38,597	
1973	Chris Evert	2	Laffit Pincay Jr.	Joe Trovato	Carl Rosen	7 F	1:25.20	$38,201	
1972	Cam Axe	2	Earlie Fires	George T. Poole	Pastorale Stable	7 F	1:24.00	$36,569	
1971	Barely Even	2	Tommy Barrow	Lou Goldfine	Mrs. S. Leonard Gilmartin	7 F	1:25.80	$32,195	
1970	Levee Night	2	Eddie Snell	Herbert K. Stevens	John Shouse	7 F	1:23.60	$43,186	
1969	Goddess Special	2	Hector Viera	Thomas W. Kelley	Fred W. Hooper	7 F	1:27.00	$36,166	
1968	Spring Sunshine	2	Don Brumfield	Henry Forrest	Calumet Farm	7 F	1:24.00	$40,310	
1967	Shenow	2	Laffit Pincay Jr.	Dick Posey	Everett J. Lowrance	7 F	1:23.80	$40,703	
1966	Woozem	2	Kenny Knapp	Willard L. Proctor	Graham Brown	7 F	1:23.60	$27,979	
1965	Chalina	2	Larry Kunitake	Moody Jolley	Mrs. Moody Jolley	7 F	1:25.40	$25,990	
1964-1	Wild Song	2	Kenneth Church	John J. Gavin Jr.	Forrest H. Lindsay	7 F	1:23.80	$7,654	
1964-2	Torrid Miss	2	Robert Gallimore	Kenny Noe Sr.	W. M. Wickham	7 F	1:24.20	$7,654	
1963-1	Ivalinda	2	Robert Gallimore	Raymond P. Adams	Mr. & Mrs. Jay Stephenson	7 F	1:24.40	$7,678	
1963-2	Royal Bund	2	Don Brumfield	Frank E. Cundall	Bwamazon Farm	7 F	1:24.40	$7,776	
1962	Sequent	2	Frank Callico	T. R. Watson	Ethel Biederman	7 F	1:25.20	$11,375	
1928	1961	Race not held							
1927	Easter Stockings	2	R. Russell	Kay Spence	Audley Farm Stable	7 F	1:27.00	$	
1926	Rolled Stocking	2	Willie Crump	Charles C. Van Meter	James W. Parrish	7 F	1:25.80	$	
1925	Rhinock	2	Earl Scobie	William D. Covington	Parkview Stable (Mrs. George B. Cox)	7 F	1:28.60	$	
1924	Captain Hal	2	Jake Heupel	Walter S. Hopkins	A. A. Kaiser	7 F	1:26.00	$5,880	
1923	Glide	2	Willie Fronk	Lon Jones	Harned Bros. & Jones	7 F	1:25.00	$6,480	
1922	Great Luck	2	Earl Pool	Will Perkins	D. W. Scott	7 F	1:25.60	$5,960	
1921	Jeanne Bowdre	2	Fritz Weiner	G. Hamilton Keene	John Oliver & G. Hamilton Keene	7 F	1:24.40	$5,980	
1920	Rangoon	2	Lawrence Lyke	J. Cal Milam	Johnson N. Camden Jr.	7 F	1:26.60	$6,120	
1919	Busy Signal	2	Lawrence Lyke	Herbert J. Thompson	Edward R. Bradley	8 F	1:40.00	$5,705	
1918	Legal	2	Jack Howard	Richard D. Williams	Williams Bros.	6 F	1:14.20	$1,395	
1917	Fern Handley	2	O. Willis	John J. Troxler	John J. Troxler	6 F	1:15.00	$1,460	
1916	Fan G.	2	Merritt C. Buxton	J. M. Henry Jr.	H. Fink	6 F	1:14.80	$1,400	
1915	Milestone	2	Albert Mott	A. L. Austin	R. J. Austin	6 F	1:16.00	$1,260	
1914	Vogue	2	John Metcalf	John C. Gallaher	Gallaher Bros.	6 F	1:13.80	$1,290	
1913	Edith W.	2	John McCabe	Frank D. Weir	Frank D. Weir	6 F	1:12.40	$1,480	
1912	Gowell	2	Johnny Loftus	John T. Weaver	John T. Weaver	6 F	1:13.40	$1,470	
1911	Kaiser	2	Jack Skirvin	William H. Karrick	Francis R. Hitchcock	6 F	1:12.80	$1,270	
1910	Helen Barbee	2	Ted Nolan	William T. Anderson	William T. Anderson	6 F	1:13.80	$1,050	

== See also ==
- Road to the Kentucky Oaks
