= Good Cheer (horse) =

American racehorse

- Sire: Medaglia d'Oro
- Grandsire: El Prado
- Dam: Wedding Toast
- Damsire: Street Sense
- Sex: Filly
- Foaled: 7 April 2022 (age 3)
- Country: United States
- Color: Dark Bay
- Breeder: Godolphin
- Owner: Godolphin
- Trainer: Brad H. Cox
- Record: 11 : 8 – 1 – 0
- Earnings: US$1,948,230

Major wins
- Golden Rod Stakes (2024); Rachel Alexandra Stakes (2025); Fair Grounds Oaks (2025); Kentucky Oaks (2025)
- Last updated on July 11, 2026

Good Cheer (foaled April 7, 2022) is an American Grade I winning Thoroughbred racehorse. In May 2025 Good Cheer won the prestigious Grade I Kentucky Oaks at Churchill Downs.

== Background ==
Good Cheer is a dark bay filly bred and owned by Godolphin. Her sire is Medaglia d'Oro and her dam is Wedding Toast who was sired by Street Sense, winner of the 2007 Kentucky Derby. Her dam Wedding Toast was also owned by Godolphin and won eight from 13 starts including the 2015 Grade I Ogden Phipps Stakes and Grade I Beldame Stakes at Belmont Park winning $1,419,956 in stakes. Wedding Toast has also produced a stakes winner in Ya Hayati.

Good Cheer's sire is Medaglia d'Oro who at the age of 26 stands at Godolphin's Darley Stud in Lexington, Kentucky for $75,000 in 2025. Good Cheer became Medaglia d'Oro's third Grade I Kentucky Oaks winner following Rachel Alexandra in 2009 and 2011 winner Plum Pretty.

Good Cheer is trained by the Eclipse Award winning trainer Brad H. Cox.

== Statistics ==
Date	Distance	Race	Grade	Track	Odds	Field	Finish	Winning Time	Winning (Losing) Margin	Jockey	Ref
2024 – Two-year-old season
Aug 5, 2024	1 mile	Maiden Special Weight		Indianapolis	1.20*	5	1	1:39.86	6 1/4 lengths	German Terraza	
Sep 28, 2024	1 1/16 miles	Allowance		Churchill Downs	0.62*	5	1	1:45.20	17 lengths	Luis Saez	
Oct 27, 2024	1 1/16 miles	Rag to Riches Stakes	Listed	Churchill Downs	0.74*	5	1	1:44.00	4 3/4 lengths	Luis Saez	
Nov 30, 2024	1 1/16 miles	Golden Rod Stakes	II	Churchill Downs	0.66*	7	1	1:43.26	2 1/2 lengths	Luis Saez	
2025 – Three-year-old season
Feb 15, 2025	1 1/16 miles	Rachel Alexandra Stakes	II	Fair Grounds	0.05*	4	1	1:44.12	6 1/4 lengths	Luis Saez	
Mar 22, 2025	1 1/16 miles	Fair Grounds Oaks	II	Fair Grounds	0.40*	8	1	1:43.44	3 1/2 lengths	Luis Saez	
May 2, 2025	1 1/8 miles	Kentucky Oaks	I	Churchill Downs	1.39*	13	1	1:50.15	2 1/4 lengths	Luis Saez	
June 6, 2025	1 1/8 miles	Acorn Stakes	I	Saratoga	0.30*	6	5	1:49.20	(9 1/4 lengths)	Luis Saez	
Aug 16, 2025	1 1/4 miles	Alabama Stakes	I	Saratoga	1.40*	6	2	2:03.31	(1 1/2 lengths)	Luis Saez	
Sep 20, 2025	1 1/16 miles	Cotillion Stakes	I	Parx Racing	1.70	7	6	1:42.85	(6 1/4 lengths)	Luis Saez	
2026 – Four-year-old season
Jul 10, 2026	1 1/16 miles	Iowa Distaff Stakes		Prairie Meadows	0.20*	5	1	1:43.71	5 lengths	Luis Saez	

Notes:
An (*) asterisk after the odds means Good Cheer was the post-time favorite.

== Pedigree ==
Pedigree of Good Cheer, bay filly, foaled April 7, 2022
Sire Medaglia d'Oro (1999)	El Prado (IRE) (1989)	Sadler's Wells (1981)	Northern Dancer (1961)
Sire Medaglia d'Oro (1999)	El Prado (IRE) (1989)	Sadler's Wells (1981)	Fairy Bridge (1975)
Sire Medaglia d'Oro (1999)	El Prado (IRE) (1989)	Lady Capulet (1974)	Sir Ivor (1965)
Sire Medaglia d'Oro (1999)	El Prado (IRE) (1989)	Lady Capulet (1974)	Cap and Bells (1958)
Sire Medaglia d'Oro (1999)	Cappucino Bay (1989)	Bailjumper (1974)	Damascus (1964)
Sire Medaglia d'Oro (1999)	Cappucino Bay (1989)	Bailjumper (1974)	Court Circuit (1964)
Sire Medaglia d'Oro (1999)	Cappucino Bay (1989)	Dubbed In (1973)	Silent Screen (1967)
Sire Medaglia d'Oro (1999)	Cappucino Bay (1989)	Dubbed In (1973)	Society Singer (1968)
Dam Wedding Toast (2010)	Street Sense (2004)	Street Cry (IRE) (1998)	Machiavellian (1987)
Dam Wedding Toast (2010)	Street Sense (2004)	Street Cry (IRE) (1998)	Helen Street (GB) (1982)
Dam Wedding Toast (2010)	Street Sense (2004)	Bedazzle (1997)	Dixieland Band (1980)
Dam Wedding Toast (2010)	Street Sense (2004)	Bedazzle (1997)	Majestic Legend (1985)
Dam Wedding Toast (2010)	Golden Sheba (2002)	Coronado's Quest (1995)	Forty Niner (1985)
Dam Wedding Toast (2010)	Golden Sheba (2002)	Coronado's Quest (1995)	Laughing Look (1986)
Dam Wedding Toast (2010)	Golden Sheba (2002)	Mari's Sheba (1992)	Mari's Book (1978)
Dam Wedding Toast (2010)	Golden Sheba (2002)	Mari's Sheba (1992)	Sheba Little (GB) (1984) (family: 16-h)
