= Proud Spell =

American-bred Thoroughbred racehorse

- Sire: Proud Citizen
- Grandsire: Gone West
- Dam: Pacific Spell
- Damsire: Langfuhr
- Sex: Mare
- Foaled: May 13, 2005
- Country: United States
- Colour: Bay
- Breeder: Brereton C. Jones
- Owner: Brereton C. Jones
- Trainer: J. Larry Jones
- Record: 13: 7-4-2
- Earnings: $2,131,610

Major wins
- Matron Stakes (2007); Fair Grounds Oaks (2008); Kentucky Oaks (2008); Delaware Oaks (2008); Alabama Stakes (2008)

Awards
- American Champion Three-Year-Old Filly (2008)

Proud Spell (foaled May 13, 2005) is an American Thoroughbred racehorse and broodmare. As a two-year-old in 2007 she was rated one of the best juvenile fillies in the United States, winning her first three races including the Matron Stakes before finishing second in the Breeders' Cup Juvenile Fillies. She was even more successful in her second season, winning four races including the Fair Grounds Oaks, Kentucky Oaks, Delaware Oaks and Alabama Stakes. She was retired from racing after a single unsuccessful appearance as a four-year-old.

== Background ==
Proud Spell is a bay mare standing just under 15.3 hands high with a narrow white blaze bred in Kentucky by her owner Brereton C. Jones. She is from the first crop of foals sired by Proud Citizen, who won the Lexington Stakes and finished second to War Emblem in the 2002 Kentucky Derby. As a breeding stallion, Proud Citizen has also sired the Kentucky Oaks winner Believe You Can. Proud Spell was the first foal out of Pacific Spell, who won two minor races from sixteen starts in 2002 and 2003.

The filly was set into training with J. Larry Jones and was ridden in all of her races by Gabriel Saez.

== Racing career ==
=== 2007: two-year-old season ===
Proud Spell made her track debut in a maiden race over five furlongs at Delaware Park Racetrack on July 30, 2007. Starting at odds of 5.2/1, she took the lead in the straight and won by half a length from her stablemate Sheriff's Choice. In the White Clay Creek Stakes over six furlongs at the same track in August she started favorite and won by five lengths from Extra Sexy Psychic after taking the lead a furlong out. Proud Spell was then moved up in class to contest the Grade II Matron Stakes over seven furlongs at Belmont Park on September 15. Starting the 1.7/1 favorite against six opponents she raced in fifth place before switching to the outside in the straight and drawing away in the stretch to win by four and quarter lengths from Armonk. After the race, Larry Jones commented "We've been able to bring her along at a natural progression with distances. With her running style, she likes to come from off the pace, so we're not expecting two turns to be a major problem. She's come home quick in every race, and most of the time, under a hand ride. We haven't asked her to do a whole lot. More than likely, the Breeders' Cup Juvenile Fillies will be our next start." Saez, who was winning his first major race, said "It feels pretty good. This is a very nice filly. She relaxed great and finished up when I asked her to run. I'm excited about the Breeders' Cup".

On October 27, Proud Spell contested the twenty-fourth edition of the Breeders' Cup Juvenile Fillies, run that year at Monmouth Park and was made the 9.4/1 third favorite in a thirteen-runner field. She raced in third place before moving into second in the straight and finished three and a half lengths behind the wire-to-wire winner Indian Blessing.

=== 2008: three-year-old season ===
Proud Spell began her second season in the Silverbulletday Stakes over one and one sixteenth miles at Fair Grounds Race Course on February 9. She raced in fifth place before finishing strongly and finished strongly to take second place, a length behind Indian Blessing. Over the same course and distance on March 8, Proud Spell faced Indian Blessing for the third time in the Grade II Fair Ground Oaks. Starting the 1.9/1 second favorite in a four-runner field, she tracked Indian Blessing before taking the lead in the straight and winning by two and a quarter lengths. On April 5 Proud Spell was moved back up to Grade I class for the Ashland Stakes (a major trial race for the Kentucky Oaks) on the Polytrack surface at Keeneland. She started the 1.9/1 second favorite, but after starting awkwardly she finished third, beaten a neck and to and a half lengths by Little Belle and Bsharpsonata.

On May 2, 2008, Proud Spell contested the 134th edition of the Kentucky Oaks on a sloppy track at Churchill Downs. Jones had entered both Proud Spell and Eight Belles in the race but opted to run the latter filly in the Kentucky Derby. In a ten-runner field for the Oaks, Proud Spell was made the 3.4/1 favorite ahead of Country Star (Alcibiades Stakes), Pure Clan, Little Belle and Bsharpsonata. Saez settled the favorite behind the leader Bsharpsonata before moving up on the outside to take the lead in the straight. She drew away from her opponents in the closing stages to win by five lengths, with Little Belle taking second ahead of Pure Clan. Larry Jones explained that the filly had been unsuited by the synthetic surface at Keeneland and added "We were very fortunate with this filly because she has never been passed in her career. We felt like if we can run the speed down, she would be in good shape. This filly can run all day long. She is just a quality filly" Brereton Jones, described the winning jockey as "one of the up-and-coming young riders in the country. He's fearless; nothing bothers him". On the following day Eight Belles, ridden by Saez, was fatally injured when finishing second in the Derby.

On her next appearance, Proud Spell started the odds-on favorite when matched against Godolphin Racing's filly Music Note in the Grade I Mother Goose Stakes over nine furlongs at Belmont on June 28. The filly stumbled badly exiting the starting stalls and had a "rough trip", being blocked when attempting a forward move two furlong out. She finished second behind Music Note but was demoted to third place after hanging sharply to the right and hampering Never Retreat in the stretch. Larry Jones commented "from the beginning, it looked like it wasn't going to be our day. When we needed somewhere to go, we had nowhere to go. And when it was time to go, we weren't going". Proud Spell was then dropped in class to contest the Delaware Oaks on July 12 and started the 0.3/1 favorite against five opponents. Conceding at least six pounds to her rivals, she tracked the leader African Violet before taking the lead inside the final furlong and winning by three-quarters of a length.

At Saratoga Race Course on August 16, Proud Spell was again matched against Music Note, who had won the CCA Oaks by eleven lengths since her win in the Mother Goose, in the Grade I Alabama Stakes over ten furlongs. Music Note, coupled in the betting with her stablemate Little Belle, started 9/10 favorite with Proud Spell next in the betting ahead of the outsiders Sweet Vendetta and Mushka. Little Belle set the early pace from Proud Spell and Mushka with Music Note in fourth. On the turn into the stretch Proud Spell took the lead but was soon challenged by Music Note on the outside. The two fillies raced together throughout the final furlong wit Proud Spell prevailing by a head. After the race, Larry Jones explained his instructions to the jockey "I told Gabriel, 'Do not let Music Note in front. I don't care if you have to ride her all the way to the barn area, down Nelson Avenue, or what, she don't get in front.' Because if you come up to her and eyeball her, you won't beat her. As soon as Music Note got to her, the race was on, and she dug in and found a way to out-gut her". Saez said that "when I got to the eighth pole, I had to push a little harder. When I saw Music Note come along side of us, I told my filly, 'C'mon, let's start running.' It was an exciting finish".

On her next appearance, Proud Spell was assigned top weight of 124 pounds, but nevertheless started odds-on favorite for the Grade II Cotillion Handicap at Philadelphia Park on September 20. After tracking the leaders she was bumped when attempting to make a forward move in the straight and finished second, two and a half lengths behind the winner Seattle Smooth. After the race Brereton Jones announced that the filly would be rested before probably returning in 2009. He said that Saez had been given "a lesson in race riding" by the other jockeys in the Cotillion but added "I'm going to stick with him; he's a great kid and I think he's going to be a Hall of Fame jockey one day."

=== 2009: four-year-old season ===
Proud Spell remained in training as a four-year-old in 2009, making her first and only appearance in a minor race at Oaklawn Park on March 12. She started the 1/5 favorite but was beaten two and a half lengths by Superior Storm. She developed a leg infection after the race and her retirement was announced on April 13. Brereton Jones explained "The infection would not have caused her retirement were we not already thinking about retiring her. We had made the decision to race her this year, and we felt comfortable with that, but when she got the infection, it meant we couldn't make the Apple Blossom because she needed a work... So we retired her."

== Assessment and awards ==
In the 2007 Experimental Free Handicap Proud Spell was rated the third-best two-year-old filly in the United States. She was the highest-earning three-year-old filly of the year in the United States in 2008 and the eighth-highest money winner of any age or sex. In the Eclipse Awards for 2008, Proud Spell was named American Champion Three-Year-Old Filly. On receiving the award Brereton Jones said "No horse has ever passed her in the stretch during her entire racing career, and that's a big statement when you've been running against the best fillies in America" while The Blood-Horse described her as "one of the grittiest runners on the track today".

In 2014 Proud Spell was inducted into Fair Grounds Race Course's local Hall of Fame. On accepting the award, Larry Jones said "Proud Spell had such perseverance. She always gave her all. I've always said you can learn as much about what makes good character from a horse as you can from other people, and Proud Spell was the perfect example of that".

== Breeding record ==
Since her retirement from racing, Proud Spell has produced at least three foals:

- Indian Spell, a dark bay or brown filly, foaled in 2010, sired by Indian Charlie, won two races including the Miss Woodford Stakes
- Tiz Possible, bay filly, 2011, by Tiznow, unraced
- Etruscan, dark bay or brown colt, 2012, by Bernardini, unplaced in two races (active in 2014)

== Pedigree ==
Pedigree of Proud Spell (USA), bay mare, 2005
Sire Proud Citizen (USA) 1999	Gone West (USA); 1984	Mr. Prospector	Raise a Native
Sire Proud Citizen (USA) 1999	Gone West (USA); 1984	Mr. Prospector	Gold Digger
Sire Proud Citizen (USA) 1999	Gone West (USA); 1984	Secrettame	Secretariat
Sire Proud Citizen (USA) 1999	Gone West (USA); 1984	Secrettame	Tamerett
Sire Proud Citizen (USA) 1999	Drums of Freedom (USA); 1990	Green Forest	Shecky Greene
Sire Proud Citizen (USA) 1999	Drums of Freedom (USA); 1990	Green Forest	Tell Meno Lies
Sire Proud Citizen (USA) 1999	Drums of Freedom (USA); 1990	Danseuse Etoile	Buckpasser
Sire Proud Citizen (USA) 1999	Drums of Freedom (USA); 1990	Danseuse Etoile	Arctic Dancer
Dam Pacific Spell (USA) 1999	Langfuhr (CAN); 1992	Danzig	Northern Dancer
Dam Pacific Spell (USA) 1999	Langfuhr (CAN); 1992	Danzig	Pas de Nom
Dam Pacific Spell (USA) 1999	Langfuhr (CAN); 1992	Sweet Briar Too	Briarctic
Dam Pacific Spell (USA) 1999	Langfuhr (CAN); 1992	Sweet Briar Too	Prima Baba Gum
Dam Pacific Spell (USA) 1999	Malibu Magic (USA); 1988	Encino	Nijinsky
Dam Pacific Spell (USA) 1999	Malibu Magic (USA); 1988	Encino	Crimson Saint
Dam Pacific Spell (USA) 1999	Malibu Magic (USA); 1988	Dream Harder	Hard Work
Dam Pacific Spell (USA) 1999	Malibu Magic (USA); 1988	Dream Harder	Great Squaw (Family: 4-m)
