= Donnie Meche =

American jockey

Personal information
- Born: October 10, 1974 (age 51) Rayne, Louisiana
- Occupation: Jockey

Horse racing career
- Sport: Horse racing
- Career wins: 1,900 (ongoing)

Major racing wins
- Illinois Oaks (1998); Fair Grounds Oaks (2000, 2003); Silverbulletday Stakes (2000, 2005); Louisiana Derby (2001); Remington Springboard Mile Stakes (2001, 2002); Spinaway Stakes (2001); Arkansas Derby (2002); Black Gold Stakes 2002); Kentucky Stakes (2002); Lecomte Stakes (2002); Louisville Handicap (2002); Rebel Stakes (2002); Southwest Stakes (2002); Thoroughbred Club of America Stakes (2002); Delta Princess Stakes (2004); Mardi Gras Stakes (2005); Taylor's Special Handicap (2007); Gentilly Stakes (2009)

Significant horses
- Fifty Stars

Donnie James Meche (born October 10, 1974 in Rayne, Louisiana) is an American jockey in Thoroughbred horse racing.

Donnie Meche won his first race at Evangeline Downs in May 1993. He was the top apprentice rider at Louisiana Downs in 1994.

He is ten minutes younger than twin brother Lonnie, who, along with younger brother Cody, is also a jockey.

Chart (2000–present)	Peak position
National Earnings List for Jockeys 2000	61
National Earnings List for Jockeys 2001	47
National Earnings List for Jockeys 2002	46
