= Easter Stockings =

American-bred Thoroughbred racehorse

- Sire: Sir Barton
- Grandsire: Star Shoot
- Dam: Irish Lassie
- Damsire: Celt
- Sex: Filly
- Foaled: 1925
- Country: United States
- Colour: Chestnut
- Breeder: Montfort & Bernard B. Jones
- Owner: Audley Farm Stable
- Trainer: Kay Spence
- Record: 68: 22-16-8
- Earnings: US$91,435

Major wins
- Golden Rod handicap (1927); Kentucky Oaks (1928); Latonia Oaks (1928); Roessler Handicap (1928); Eden Park Purse (1928); Crusader's Special Cap (1929); Covington Handicap (1930); Kentucky Handicap (1930); Latonia Inaugural Handicap (1930)

Awards
- American Champion Three-Year-Old Filly (1928)

Easter Stockings (foaled 1925) was an American Thoroughbred Champion racehorse. Bred by brothers Montfort and B. B. Jones, who made a fortune in the oil business in Oklahoma, she was foaled at their Audley Farm in Berryville, Virginia. She was out of the mare, Irish Lassie, a daughter Celt, the 1921 leading sire in North America. Her sire was Sir Barton, a U.S. Racing Hall of Fame inductee and the first horse to ever win the U.S. Triple Crown series.

Raced under the banner of Audley Farm Stable, Easter Stockings was trained by Kay Spence. A winner at two, in 1928 Easter Stockings won the Kentucky and Latonia Oaks en route to earning American Champion Three-Year-Old Filly honors. At age four she returned to the track and won several good races including events against her male counterparts.
