= Silverbulletday =

American Thoroughbred racehorse

- Sire: Silver Deputy
- Grandsire: Deputy Minister
- Dam: Rokeby Rose
- Damsire: Tom Rolfe
- Sex: Mare
- Foaled: 1996
- Country: United States
- Color: Bay
- Breeder: Highclere Inc. & Clear Creek
- Owner: Michael E. Pegram
- Trainer: Bob Baffert
- Record: 23: 15-3-1
- Earnings: $3,093,207

Major wins
- Debutante Stakes (1998); Golden Rod Stakes (1998); Sorrento Stakes (1998); Alcibiades Stakes (1998); Ashland Stakes (1999); Kentucky Oaks (1999); Black-Eyed Susan Stakes (1999); Monmouth Oaks (1999); Gazelle Handicap (1999); Fair Grounds Oaks (1999); Alabama Stakes (1999); Davona Dale Stakes (1999); Doubledogdare Stakes (2000) Breeders' Cup wins: Breeders' Cup Juvenile Fillies (1998)

Awards
- United States Champion 2-Yr-Old Filly (1998); United States Champion 3-Yr-Old Filly (1999)

Honors
- Silverbulletday Stakes at Fair Grounds Race Course; Fair Grounds Racing Hall of Fame (2002); U.S. Racing Hall of Fame (2009)
- Last updated on October 30, 2021

Silverbulletday (foaled January 22, 1996 in Kentucky) is an American Thoroughbred champion racehorse. Bred in Kentucky, she was sired by Silver Deputy and out of the GII winning mare Rokeby Rose. Her damsire was Tom Rolfe, the 1965 Preakness Stakes winner and that year's U.S. Champion 3-Yr-Old Colt. Her grandsire was Deputy Minister, the 1981 Canadian Horse of the Year.

== 1998: two-year-old season ==
Purchased by Michael E. Pegram, who gave her to trainer Bob Baffert for conditioning, Silverbulletday began her racing career at age two with an 11-length win. In her second start, she won the Grade II Debutante Stakes at Churchill Downs in June at six furlongs under jockey Gary Stevens. In late July, Stevens guided Silverbulletday to a win in the Grade III six and one half furlong Sorrento Stakes at Del Mar. After her first loss in the Grade III Del Mar Debutante, Baffert and Pegram mapped out a strategy of attempting to win the division by moving her tack for the rest of the year to Churchill Downs in Louisville, Kentucky. There Silverbulletday reeled off another three straight wins to finish her championship season.

In early October, she won the Grade II Alcibiades Stakes at Keeneland Race Course at a mile and one sixteenth. Then she clinched the division title with a win in the fall's Grade I Breeders' Cup Juvenile Fillies held at Churchill that year. In that race, she beat a very strong field of ten, including stakes winners Excellent Meeting and Three Ring, who finished second and third. Baffert then wheeled her back in three weeks to capture the Grade III Golden Rod Stakes at a mile and one sixteenth at Churchill.

Silverbulletday's performances in 1998 earned her United States Champion 2-Yr-Old Filly honors.

== 1999: three-year-old season ==
In 1999, Silverbulletday won five straight races, including prestigious stakes races like the Ashland Stakes.

In early May, she won the Kentucky Oaks, the fillies equivalent of the Kentucky Derby, giving the now two time Triple Crown winning trainer Bob Baffert his first Kentucky Oaks winner.

Her next start was two weeks later on May 14 in the Black-Eyed Susan Stakes, the fillies equivalent of the Preakness Stakes, which is the second jewel in the Triple Crown. The Black-Eyed Susan is the second jewel of the National Triple Tiara, run at a mile and one eighth at Pimlico Race Course in Baltimore, Maryland. Silverbulletday beat a field of stakes winners, including Dreams Gallore and Vee Vee Star, who finished second and third respectively.

Later that year, Silverbulletday was entered in the third of the American Classic Races, the Belmont Stakes. She held the lead through more than three-quarters of the race but the 1½ mile test proved too long for her and she finished seventh to winner Lemon Drop Kid.

Silverbulletday came back to win over fillies in the Monmouth Oaks at Monmouth Park.

Then she raced in the third jewel of the New York Triple Tiara, the 1¼-mile Alabama Stakes at Saratoga Race Course, which she won by nine lengths.

She next won another Grade I event, the Gazelle Handicap, then ran second in the Beldame Stakes to Beautiful Pleasure. The heavy parimutuel betting favorite for the 1999 Breeders' Cup Distaff, Silverbulletday was in contention until the stretch drive but then faded and finished sixth to winner Beautiful Pleasure.

Silverbulletday's performances in 1999 earned her United States Champion 3-Yr-Old Filly honors.

== 2000: four-year-old season ==
In 2000, Silverbulletday returned to the track. Her best results were a win in the Doubledogdare Stakes at Keeneland Race Course and second-place finishes in the Grade II Fleur de Lis and Molly Pitcher Handicaps.

== Retirement ==
Retired to broodmare duty having won fifteen races and banked more than $3 million, Silverbulletday has produced foals by prominent sires such as A.P. Indy and Storm Cat, but none to date have found significant racing success.

Silverbulletday was a 2007 finalist on the balloting for induction in the U.S. Racing Hall of Fame. In 2009, she was inducted.

== Pedigree ==
Pedigree of Silverbulletday
Sire Silver Deputy dk br 1985	Deputy Minister bay 1979	Vice Regent	Northern Dancer
Sire Silver Deputy dk br 1985	Deputy Minister bay 1979	Vice Regent	Victoria Regina
Sire Silver Deputy dk br 1985	Deputy Minister bay 1979	Mint Copy	Bunty's Flight
Sire Silver Deputy dk br 1985	Deputy Minister bay 1979	Mint Copy	Shakney
Sire Silver Deputy dk br 1985	Silver Valley chestnut 1979	Mr. Prospector	Raise a Native
Sire Silver Deputy dk br 1985	Silver Valley chestnut 1979	Mr. Prospector	Gold Digger
Sire Silver Deputy dk br 1985	Silver Valley chestnut 1979	Seven Valleys	Road at Sea
Sire Silver Deputy dk br 1985	Silver Valley chestnut 1979	Seven Valleys	Proud Pied
Dam Rokeby Rose dk br 1977	Tom Rolfe bay 1962	Ribot	Tenerani
Dam Rokeby Rose dk br 1977	Tom Rolfe bay 1962	Ribot	Romanella
Dam Rokeby Rose dk br 1977	Tom Rolfe bay 1962	Pocahontas	Roman
Dam Rokeby Rose dk br 1977	Tom Rolfe bay 1962	Pocahontas	How
Dam Rokeby Rose dk br 1977	Rokeby Venus bay 1970	Quadrangle	Cohoes
Dam Rokeby Rose dk br 1977	Rokeby Venus bay 1970	Quadrangle	Tap Day
Dam Rokeby Rose dk br 1977	Rokeby Venus bay 1970	All Beautiful	Battlefield
Dam Rokeby Rose dk br 1977	Rokeby Venus bay 1970	All Beautiful	Parlo
