= Verne Winchell =

American businessman/race horse owner

- Born: October 30, 1915; Bloomington, Illinois, United States
- Died: November 26, 2002 (age 87); Las Vegas, Nevada, United States
- Education: Pasadena City College
- Occupation(s): Businessman; Racehorse owner/breeder
- Known for: Founder of Winchell's Donuts
- Spouse: Joan
- Children: 4

Verne Hedges Winchell (October 30, 1915 – November 26, 2002) was the founder of Winchell's Donuts and also served as a chairman, president and chief executive officer of the Denny's restaurant chain.

== Early life ==
Winchell was born on October 30, 1915 in Bloomington, Illinois. At the age of 9, Winchell and his family moved to California. Winchell graduated from Alhambra High School and later took business courses at Pasadena City College, where he decided on a business career.

== Career ==
In 1948 he opened his first doughnut shop in Temple City, California and earned the nickname "The Donut King". Winchell's Donuts merged with Denny's Incorporated in 1967. Winchell served as chairman of the board, president, and chief executive officer of Denny's until 1980.

== Thoroughbred breeder ==
Winchell was also a successful horse breeder and owner. Today his son, Ron Winchell oversees racing stable and breeding operation known as Winchell Thoroughbreds which is located at Corinthia Farm near Lexington, Kentucky. The Winchells were co-owners of 2017 American Horse of the Year Gun Runner. The Winchells won the 2014 Kentucky Oaks and Breeders' Cup Distaff with their homebred US Champion Three-Year-Old Filly Untapable, the 2012 Breeders' Cup Dirt Mile with Tapizar and 2005 Kentucky Oaks with Summerly.

== Death ==
Winchell died of a cardiac arrest in Las Vegas, Nevada on November 26, 2002 at the age of 87, at Summerlin Hospital. Winchell had been a resident of Las Vegas for 30 years.

== Legacy ==
Ron Winchell, Verne Winchell's son, began a chain of restaurants in the Las Vegas area named "Winchell's Pub and Grill". The first restaurant opened in south Las Vegas in 2000. Ron Winchell later expanded the chain by opening two more restaurants in 2003, one in south Las Vegas and one in North Las Vegas. On July 18, 2008, Ron Winchell opened another restaurant in North Las Vegas and planned to open two more restaurants within a few months.

In 2019, Ron Winchell partnered with Marc Falcone through their company Kentucky Racing Association and purchased Kentucky Downs.
