= Michael E. Pegram =

American racehorse owner

- Born: February 16, 1952 (age 74); Fort Knox, Kentucky, U.S.
- Occupations: Fast food retailer Racehorse owner Casino Owner

Michael E. Pegram (born February 16, 1952, in Fort Knox, Kentucky) is the co-owner of the 2010 Preakness Stakes winner Lookin at Lucky and owner of the 1998 Kentucky Derby and Preakness Stakes winner Real Quiet. He grew up in Princeton, Indiana going to the races at Ellis Park Racecourse and Churchill Downs and dreamed of someday owning a Kentucky Derby winner. He also won the 1998 Breeders' Cup Juvenile Fillies with Silverbulletday and after she was voted that year's Eclipse Award for Outstanding 2-Year-Old Filly, came back in 1999 to win the Kentucky Oaks. In 2013, Rosie Napravnik rode Midnight Lucky to victory in the Acorn Stakes, Pegram was a co-owner of Midnight Lucky.

Among his other horses, Pegram owned Captain Steve, High Stakes Player, Queen of Money, Miss Gibson County, Wheeler Oil, Argolid, Favored One, Arches of Gold, Pussycat Doll, The Texas Tunnel and Uncle Chuck.

Pegram became successful as owner of several McDonald's restaurant franchises in the state of Washington, a business that his father Jim had been involved with. Pegram has since moved his restaurant empire to Phoenix, where he lives part-time. Pegram also resides in Del Mar, California. He has three children: Amie and Tim Pegram and Tiffany Peach and three brothers: Jim (a jockey agent), Demont and Gil. Pegram also enjoyed success by winning the $2 million Breeders' Cup Sprint at Monmouth Park in 2007 with Midnight Lute, who trainer Bob Baffert stated was the best horse he'd ever brought to the Breeder's Cup. His champion returned the following year at Santa Anita Park to capture the same race and the first sprinter to ever do so.
