= Neil J. Howard =

American horse trainer

Neil Howard
Personal information
- Born: February 23, 1949 (age 77) Riverdale, Bronx, New York, United States
- Occupation: Trainer

Horse racing career
- Sport: Horse racing
- Career wins: 1,198+ (ongoing)

Major racing wins
- Turfway Park Fall Championship Stakes (1982); Schuylerville Stakes (1984); Edgewood Stakes (1985); Regret Stakes (1985); Hopeful Stakes (1989); Saratoga Special Stakes (1989); Blue Grass Stakes (1990); Lane's End Stakes (1990); Pennsylvania Derby (1990); Fayette Stakes (1991, 1993, 2004, 2005); Acorn Stakes (1992); Ashland Stakes (1992); Louisiana Derby (1992, 1998); Laurel Futurity Stakes (1993); Lexington Stakes (1993); Florida Oaks (1995, 2000, 2001); King's Bishop Stakes (1995); Maker's Mark Mile Stakes (1995, 1997); Elkhorn Stakes (1996); Alabama Stakes (1997); Ruffian Handicap (1997); Falls City Handicap (1998); Fountain of Youth Stakes (1998); Lawrence Realization Stakes (1998); Lexington Stakes (1998); Personal Ensign Stakes (1998, 2005); Risen Star Stakes (1998, 2004); Tampa Bay Derby (1998); Ben Ali Stakes (1999, 2003, 2004, 2005, 2016); Kentucky Oaks (2000); Mother Goose Stakes (2000); New Orleans Handicap (2002, 2003); Jockey Club Gold Cup (2003); Pimlico Special (2003); Suburban Handicap (2003); Woodward Stakes (2003); Black Gold Stakes (2005); Louisville Stakes (2005); Turf Classic Stakes (2005); Lecomte Stakes (2011) American Classic Race wins: Preakness Stakes (1990)

Honors
- Fair Grounds Racing Hall of Fame (2005)

Significant horses
- Midway Road, Mineshaft, Summer Squall

Neil J. Howard (born February 23, 1949, in Riverdale, Bronx, New York) is an American Thoroughbred horse racing trainer.

Howard began working for a racing stable in 1969 and went on to spend seven years as an assistant and stable foreman to future Hall of Fame trainer MacKenzie Miller before going out on his own in 1979.

With Summer Squall, in 1990 Neil Howard won the second leg of the U.S. Triple Crown series, the Preakness Stakes and in 2003 trained Mineshaft to American Horse of the Year honors.
