= Kentucky Oaks =

American Thoroughbred stakes horse race

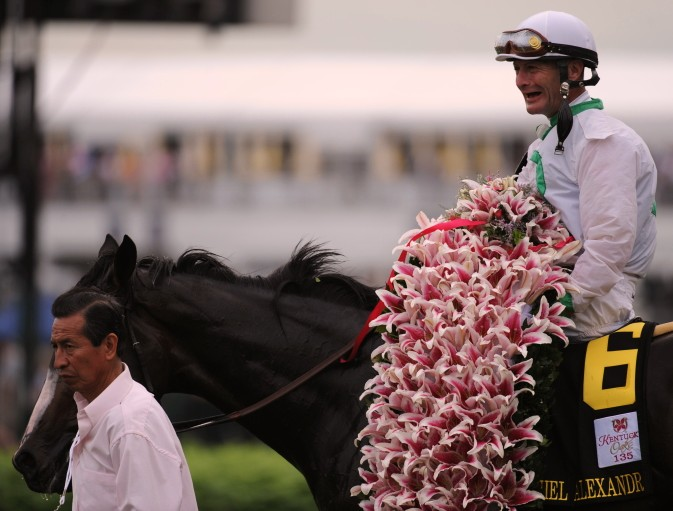
- Lilies for the Fillies
- Class: Grade I
- Location: Churchill Downs; Louisville, Kentucky, US
- Inaugurated: May 19, 1875
- Race type: Thoroughbred
- Website: Race webpage

Race information
- Distance: 1 1/8 miles
- Surface: Dirt
- Track: Left-handed
- Qualification: 3-year-old fillies
- Weight: 121 lb (55 kg)
- Purse: $1.5 million 1st: $846,300

The Kentucky Oaks is a Grade I stakes race for three-year-old Thoroughbred fillies staged annually in Louisville, Kentucky, United States. The race currently covers 1 1/8 miles (1,800 m) at Churchill Downs; the horses carry 121 pounds (55 kg). The Kentucky Oaks is held on the Friday before the Kentucky Derby each year. The winner gets $846,300 of the $1,500,000 purse, and a large garland blanket of lilies, resulting in the nickname "Lilies for the Fillies." A silver Kentucky Oaks Trophy is presented to the winner.

== History ==
The first running of the Kentucky Oaks was on May 19, 1875, when Churchill Downs was known as the Louisville Jockey Club. The race was founded by Meriwether Lewis Clark Jr. along with the Kentucky Derby, the Clark Handicap, and the Falls City Handicap.

The Kentucky Oaks and the Kentucky Derby are the oldest continuously contested sporting events in American history. The Kentucky Oaks was modeled after the British Epsom Oaks, which has been run annually at Epsom Downs, Epsom, in Surrey since 1779. In the first race, the horse Vinaigrette won the then 1 1/2 miles (2.4 km) mile race in a time of 2:39 3/4, winning a purse of $1,175. Since that race, the Kentucky Oaks has been held each year.

In 2020, due to the COVID-19 pandemic, the Kentucky Oaks was rescheduled from May 1 to September 4.

The Kentucky Oaks is considered by some to be among the most popular horse races in American horse-racing society due to its high attendance. It has attracted about 100,000 people in attendance each year since 2001's 127th running of the Kentucky Oaks. In 1980, attendance reached about 50,000 people and by 1989, it had increased to about 67,000. The attendance at the Kentucky Oaks ranks third in North America and usually surpasses the attendance of all other stakes races including the Belmont Stakes and the Breeders' Cup. The attendance of the Kentucky Oaks typically trails only the Kentucky Derby and the Preakness Stakes; for more information see American thoroughbred racing top attended events.

The Kentucky Oaks, the Black-Eyed Susan Stakes, and the Acorn Stakes are the counterparts to the Triple Crown of Thoroughbred Racing, held at Churchill Downs, Pimlico Race Course and Belmont Park, respectively. The "Filly Triple Crown", known as the Triple Tiara of Thoroughbred Racing, is a series of three races at the Belmont Park and Saratoga Race Course. The National Thoroughbred Racing Association (NTRA) has considered changing the Triple Tiara series to the three counterparts of the Triple Crown.

In July 2025, Churchill Downs announced that the 2026 Kentucky Oaks would move from USA Network to a primetime broadcast on NBC. Churchill Downs Inc. CEO Bill Carstanjen stated that the changes would help increase the "national profile" of the Oaks, after the 2025 Kentucky Derby achieved the race's largest television audience since 1989. With these changes, the post time was moved back from approximately 5:51 p.m. ET to 8:40 p.m. ET. The change was considered controversial by local restaurants, as they typically received a large influx of evening dinner reservations from patrons returning from the Oaks, and believed that the later start time would discourage this. Churhcill Downs stated that it was "working closely with the Kentucky Restaurant Association to minimize impacts and create greater visibility and opportunities for Louisville's outstanding restaurants during Derby Week."

== Charitable initiatives ==
Since 2008, Oaks Day has been used to highlight awareness for breast and ovarian cancer; the tradition was established by then-Kentucky governor Steve Beshear at the suggestion of Monika Clark, a patient of metastatic breast cancer whose husband was a law partner of Beshear. Attendees are encouraged to wear pink, while the "Survivors Parade" features nominated survivors of breast and ovarian cancer walking the track Churchill Downs partnered with the breast cancer charity Susan G. Komen for the Cure from 2009 through 2011, incorporating charity appeals into Oaks Day and donating a dollar for each spectator in attendance. In March 2012, Churchill Downs announced that it would instead partner with Stand Up to Cancer for that year's race, citing its wider scope.

== Awards for winners ==
Besides the silver Kentucky Oaks Trophy presented to the winner, they are also presented with a "Garland of Lilies" draped around the filly's withers.

The first garland for the Kentucky Oaks was presented to Kathleen, the 1916 winner. It was made of roses, not the lilies that have become synonymous with the filly's race today. Though every Oaks winner since Kathleen has received a garland, the Star Gazer Lily did not become the official flower of the Kentucky Oaks until 1991, when the Kroger Company was commissioned to create a feminine garland for the fillies. Lite Light, winner of the 117th Kentucky Oaks, was the first filly to receive the garland of lilies.

The Star Gazer Lily was selected for its femininity and strength. A total of 133 lilies are sewn onto a white moire fabric backing with a fleur-de-lis pattern, which, like the green satin of the Derby garland, is embroidered in white-on-white with the seal of the Commonwealth of Kentucky at one end and an image of the Twin Spires and the words stating which running of the Kentucky Oaks it is on the opposite end. It is trimmed in a border of Oak Ivy Leaves symbolic of the event. The completed fabric is 116 inches long, 18 inches wide and weighs approximately 18 pounds. A bouquet of Star Gazer Lilies is also given to the jockey for the winner's circle photo. Kroger is the official florist of the Kentucky Oaks and Derby. The public can view the lily garland at a local Kroger store the evening before the race.

== Changes in distance ==
The Kentucky Oaks has been run at four different distances:

- 1875–1890, the race was 1 1/2 miles;
- 1891–1895, it was 1 1/4 miles;
- 1896–1919, it was 1 1/16 miles;
- 1920–1941, changed to 1 1/8 miles;
- 1942–1981, run at 1 1/16 miles; and
- 1982, set at 1 1/8 miles, and it has been that distance since.

== Records ==
=== Speed record ===
- 1 1/8 mile 1:48.28 – Shedaresthedevil (2020)
- 1 1/2 mile 2:39 – Felicia (1877), Belle of Nelson (1878) and Katie Creel (1882).
- 1 1/4 mile 2:15 – Selika (1894)
- 1 1/16 mile 1:43.6 – Ari's Mona (1950) and Sweet Alliance (1977).

=== Largest winning margin ===
- 20 1/4 lengths – Rachel Alexandra (2009)

=== Longest shot to win the Oaks ===
- 47/1 – Lemons Forever (2006)

=== Most wins by a jockey ===
- 4 – Eddie Arcaro (1951, 1952, 1953, 1958)
- 4 – Manuel Ycaza (1959, 1960, 1963, 1968)

=== Female jockeys to win ===
- Rosie Napravnik (2012, 2014)

=== Most wins by a trainer ===
- 5 – Woody Stephens (1959, 1960, 1963, 1978, 1981)
- 5 – D. Wayne Lukas (1982, 1984, 1989, 1990, 2022)

=== Most wins by an owner ===
- 6 – Calumet Farm (1943, 1949, 1952, 1953, 1956, 1979)

=== Only brothers to both win the Kentucky Oaks ===
- Carl Seay Goose "Ganz" (1913) – Roscoe Tarleton Goose (1916)

Carl used the original German spelling of "Goose", which one of a few spellings was "Ganz", but also Gantz, Gans, and so on. The Goose brothers are cousins of Meriwether Lewis Clark Jr., the founder of the Louisville Jockey Club.

=== "Oaks/Derby Double" ===
Jockeys, trainers, and owners competing in the Kentucky Oaks often will compete in the Kentucky Derby, a race for the next day the Oaks. Winning both these races in the same year is referred to as an "Oaks/Derby Double;" 9 jockeys, 3 trainers, and 5 owners have accomplished this feat:

Year	Kentucky Oaks Winner	Kentucky Derby Winner	Jockey	Trainer	Owner
1884*	Modesty	Buchanan	Isaac Murphy	different	different
1933*	Barn Swallow	Brokers Tip	Don Meade	Herbert J. Thompson	Edward R. Bradley
1949	Wistful	Ponder	different	Ben Jones	different
1950	Ari's Mona	Middleground	Bill Boland	different	different
1952	Real Delight	Hill Gail	Eddie Arcaro	Ben Jones	Calumet Farm
1966	Native Street	Kauai King	Don Brumfield	different	different
1993	Dispute	Sea Hero	Jerry Bailey	different	different
2009	Rachel Alexandra	Mine That Bird	Calvin Borel	different	different
2018	Monomoy Girl	Justify	different	different	Head of Plains Partners/Monomoy Stables
2024	Thorpedo Anna	Mystik Dan	Brian Hernandez Jr.	Kenneth G. McPeek	different
2025	Good Cheer	Sovereignty	different	different	Godolphin
2026	Always a Runner	Golden Tempo	José Ortiz	different	different

*Until the 1950s, the Oaks was held several days or weeks after the Derby.

== Winners ==
Kentucky Oaks winners
Year	Winner	Jockey	Trainer	Owner	Distance (miles)	Time (Note: The race was timed to 1/4 second from 1875 to 1905, to 1/5 second from 1906 to 2000, and to 0.01 second since 2001.)	Grade
1875	Vinaigrette	J. Houston	Not found	A. B. Lewis & Co.	1 1/2	2:39.75	N/A
1876	Neecy Hale	W. James	Not found	Frank B. Harper	1 1/2	2:42.50	N/A
1877	Felicia	W. James	Not found	J. W. Reynolds	1 1/2	2:39.00	N/A
1878	Belle of Nelson	Booth	Not found	Mattingly & Co.	1 1/2	2:39.00	N/A
1879	Liahtunah	Hightower	Not found	James A. Grinstead	1 1/2	2:40.25	N/A
1880	Longitude	Jim McLaughlin	Not found	J. G. Malone	1 1/2	2:41.75	N/A
1881	Lucy May	Wolfe	Not found	R. F. Johnson	1 1/2	2:41.00	N/A
1882	Katie Creel	John Stoval	C. A. Johnson	Johnson & Co.	1 1/2	2:39.00	N/A
1883	Vera	John Stoval	J. Pate	Robert C. Pate	1 1/2	2:39.75	N/A
1884	Modesty	Isaac Murphy	Edward C. Corrigan	Edward C. Corrigan	1 1/2	2:48.25	N/A
1885	Lizzie Dwyer	Patrick Fuller	Edward C. Corrigan	Edward C. Corrigan	1 1/2	2:40.75	N/A
1886	Pure Rye	Edward Garrison	Not found	Melbourne Stable	1 1/2	2:41.00	N/A
1887	Florimore	Johnston	D. W. Kelly	Thomas H. Stevens	1 1/2	2:40.75	N/A
1888	Tenpenny	Andrew McCarthy Jr.	Not found	M. Welsh	1 1/2	2:42.00	N/A
1889	Jewel Ban	John Stoval	W. Clay	John T. Clay	1 1/2	2:41.00	N/A
1890	English Lady	Hollis	Hiram J. Scoggan	Scoggan Bros.	1 1/2	2:42.50	N/A
1891	Miss Hawkins	Tommy Britton	T. Hart Talbot	Talbot Bros.	1 1/4	2:18.25	N/A
1892	Miss Dixie	Harry Ray	Michael T. Danaher	Col. James E. Pepper	1 1/4	2:14.50	N/A
1893	Monrovia	J. Reagan	Edward D. Brown	Edward D. Brown	1 1/4	2:16.00	N/A
1894	Selika	Alonzo Clayton	John H. Morris	Bashford Manor Stable	1 1/4	2:15.00	N/A
1895	Voladora	Alonzo Clayton	Not found	Pastime Stable	1 1/4	2:16.75	N/A
1896	Soufflé	Charles A. Thorpe	James W. Healy	James M. Murphy	1 1/16	1:54.50	N/A
1897	White Frost	Tommy Burns	L. C. Davis	E. S. Gardner & Son	1 1/16	1:49.00	N/A
1898	Crocket	Joseph Hill	Louis Cahn	Julius C. Cahn	1 1/16	1:51.50	N/A
1899	Rush	Joseph Hill	Thomas C. McDowell	Thomas C. McDowell	1 1/16	1:52.50	N/A
1900	Etta	Monk Overton	Edward D. Brown	Ed Brown & Co.	1 1/16	1:48.00	N/A
1901	Lady Schorr	John Woods	John F. Schorr	John F. Schorr	1 1/16	1:53.00	N/A
1902	Wainamoinen	M. Coburn	T. Hart Talbot	Talbot Bros.	1 1/16	1:51.25	N/A
1903	Lemco	John Reiff	Frank Kelly	Edward Corrigan	1 1/16	1:49.75	N/A
1904	Audience	Almer Helgesen	Kimball Patterson	Samuel S. Brown	1 1/16	1:51.00	N/A
1905	Janeta	Dale Austin	R. L. Rogers	Cassin & Rogers	1 1/16	1:49.75	N/A
1906	King's Daughter	E. Robinson	Thomas C. McDowell	Thomas C. McDowell	1 1/16	1:47.80	N/A
1907	Wing Ting	James Lee	Joseph S. Hawkins	Joseph S. Hawkins	1 1/16	1:50.20	N/A
1908	Ellen-a-Dale	Vincent Powers	George Denny	Thomas C. McDowell	1 1/16	1:46.60	N/A
1909	Floreal	Sam Heidel	William H. Fizer	William H. Fizer	1 1/16	1:49.20	N/A
1910	Samaria	Richard Scoville	William McDaniel	J. P. Ross & Co.	1 1/16	1:50.20	N/A
1911	Bettie Sue	Ted Rice	D. Huestis	A. Brown	1 1/16	1:48.00	N/A
1912	Flamma	James Butwell	J. Duffy	E. F. Condran	1 1/16	1:51.20	N/A
1913	Cream	Carl Ganz	Auval John Baker	Charles C. Van Meter	1 1/16	1:47.60	N/A
1914	Bronzewing	William Obert	Daniel Lehan	Alex P. Humphrey Jr.	1 1/16	1:45.60	N/A
1915	Waterblossom	Eddie Martin	George Denny	Thomas C. McDowell	1 1/16	1:46.60	N/A
1916	Kathleen	Roscoe Goose	Peter Coyne	George J. Long	1 1/16	1:47.40	N/A
1917	Sunbonnet	Johnny Loftus	Walter B. Jennings	A. Kingsley Macomber	1 1/16	1:46.80	N/A
1918	Viva America	W. Warrington	W. N. Potts	C. T. Worthington	1 1/16	1:46.80	N/A
1919	Lillian Shaw	T. Murray	John H. McCormack	J. R. Livingston	1 1/16	1:45.00	N/A
1920	Lorraine	Danny Connelly	J. Cal Milam	Johnson N. Camden Jr.	1 1/8	1:58.40	N/A
1921	Nancy Lee	Linus McAtee	John H. McCormack	Philip Allen Clark	1 1/8	1:50.40	N/A
1922	Startle	Danny Connelly	John I. Smith	Herbert H. Hewitt	1 1/8	1:52.60	N/A
1923	Untidy	John Corcoran	James G. Rowe Jr.	Helen Hay Whitney	1 1/8	1:53.00	N/A
1924	Princess Doreen (Note: In 1924, Glide finished first but was disqualified for fouling.)	Harry Stutts	S. Miller Henderson	Audley Farm Stable	1 1/8	1:51.80	N/A
1925	Deeming	James McCoy	C. B. Dailey	C. B. Dailey	1 1/8	1:54.00	N/A
1926	Black Maria	Arthur Mortensen	William H. Karrick	William R. Coe	1 1/8	1:55.40	N/A
1927	Mary Jane	Danny Connelly	S. Sewell Combs	Gallaher & Combs	1 1/8	1:53.40	N/A
1928	Easter Stockings	Willie Crump	Kay Spence	Audley Farm Stable	1 1/8	1:51.60	N/A
1929	Rose of Sharon	Willie Crump	Daniel E. Stewart	Johnson N. Camden Jr.	1 1/8	1:51.00	N/A
1930	Alcibiades	Robert Finnerty	Walter W. Taylor	Hal Price Headley	1 1/8	1:52.60	N/A
1931	Cousin Jo	Eugene James	William Reed	Charles Nuckols Sr.	1 1/8	1:53.00	N/A
1932	Suntica	Anthony Pascuma	Jack Whyte	Willis Sharpe Kilmer	1 1/8	1:52.20	N/A
1933	Barn Swallow	Don Meade	Herbert J. Thompson	Edward R. Bradley	1 1/8	1:51.20	N/A
1934	Fiji	Gilbert Elston	Thomas B. Young	Young Bros.	1 1/8	1:51.60	N/A
1935	Paradisical	Glenn Fowler	Al Miller	Isaac J. Collins	1 1/8	1:51.20	N/A
1936	Two Bob	Raymond Workman	James W. Healy	Cornelius V. Whitney	1 1/8	1:52.60	N/A
1937	Mars Shield	Alfred Robertson	Robert V. McGarvey	Ethel V. Mars	1 1/8	1:53.40	N/A
1938	Flying Lee	Leon Haas	Duval A. Headley	Hal Price Headley	1 1/8	1:52.80	N/A
1939	Flying Lill	Carroll Bierman	Clifford Porter	Mrs. C. H. Cleary	1 1/8	1:51.00	N/A
1940	Inscolassie	Bobby Vedder	Ross O. Higdon	Woolford Farm	1 1/8	1:54.40	N/A
1941	Valdina Myth	George King	John J. Flanigan	Valdina Farms	1 1/8	1:52.60	N/A
1942	Miss Dogwood	John H. Adams	John M. Goode	Brownell Combs	1 1/16	1:47.00	N/A
1943	Nellie L.	Wendell Eads	Ben A. Jones	Calumet Farm	1 1/16	1:48.60	N/A
1944	Canina	John H. Adams	Frank E. Childs	Abe Hirschberg	1 1/16	1:48.60	N/A
1945	Come and Go	Charles L. Martin	J. Price Sallee	Thomas Piatt	1 1/16	1:49.80	N/A
1946	First Page	James R. Layton	C. A. Bidencope	H. G. Jones	1 1/16	1:51.40	N/A
1947	Blue Grass	Johnny Longden	Willie Crump	Arthur B. Hancock Jr.	1 1/16	1:51.60	N/A
1948	Challe Anne	Willie Garner	Walter U. Ridenour	F. L. Flanders	1 1/16	1:48.60	N/A
1949	Wistful	Gordon Glisson	Ben A. Jones	Calumet Farm	1 1/16	1:47.40	N/A
1950	Ari's Mona	William Boland	John C. Hauer	John C. Hauer	1 1/16	1:43.60	N/A
1951	How	Eddie Arcaro	Horatio Luro	Herman Delman	1 1/16	1:45.60	N/A
1952	Real Delight	Eddie Arcaro	Horace A. Jones	Calumet Farm	1 1/16	1:45.40	N/A
1953	Bubbley	Eddie Arcaro	Horace A. Jones	Calumet Farm	1 1/16	1:45.60	N/A
1954	Fascinator	Anthony DeSpirito	Edward A. Neloy	Maine Chance Farm	1 1/16	1:45.00	N/A
1955	Lalun	Henry E. Moreno	Loyd Gentry Jr.	Cain Hoy Stable	1 1/16	1:46.00	N/A
1956	Princess Turia	Bill Hartack	Horace A. Jones	Calumet Farm	1 1/16	1:44.80	N/A
1957	Lori-El	Lois C. Cook	Mike R. Soto	Al Berke & Mike R. Soto	1 1/16	1:44.80	N/A
1958	Bug Brush	Eddie Arcaro	Sylvester Veitch	Cornelius V. Whitney	1 1/16	1:44.80	N/A
1959 (Note: In 1959 the race was run in two divisions.)	Wedlock	John L. Rotz	Paul Shawhan	Paul Shawhan	1 1/16	1:45.00	N/A
1959	Hidden Talent	Manuel Ycaza	Woody Stephens	Cain Hoy Stable	1 1/16	1:44.40	N/A
1960	Make Sail	Manuel Ycaza	Woody Stephens	Cain Hoy Stable	1 1/16	1:44.20	N/A
1961	My Portrait	Braulio Baeza	Charles R. Parke	Fred W. Hooper	1 1/16	1:47.00	N/A
1962	Cicada	Bill Shoemaker	Casey Hayes	Meadow Stable	1 1/16	1:44.60	N/A
1963	Sally Ship	Manuel Ycaza	Woody Stephens	Cain Hoy Stable	1 1/16	1:44.80	N/A
1964	Blue Norther	Bill Shoemaker	Wally Dunn	Mrs. William R. Hawn	1 1/16	1:44.20	N/A
1965	Amerivan	Ron Turcotte	Mary D. Keim	Mary D. Keim	1 1/16	1:44.40	N/A
1966	Native Street	Don Brumfield	Les Lear	Aisco Stable	1 1/16	1:44.80	N/A
1967	Nancy Jr.	Johnny Sellers	Stanley M. Rieser	Hidden Valley Farm	1 1/16	1:44.00	N/A
1968	Dark Mirage	Manuel Ycaza	Everett W. King	Lloyd I. Miller	1 1/16	1:44.60	N/A
1969	Hail to Patsy	David Kassen	Loyd Gentry Jr.	Walter Kitchen	1 1/16	1:44.40	N/A
1970	Lady Vi-E	David Whited	John C. Oxley	A. H. & Albert M. Stall	1 1/16	1:44.80	N/A
1971	Silent Beauty	Kenny Knapp	Richard J. Fischer	Leslie Combs II	1 1/16	1:44.20	N/A
1972	Susan's Girl	Victor Tejada	John W. Russell	Fred W. Hooper	1 1/16	1:44.20	N/A
1973	Bag of Tunes	Danny Gargan	George T. Poole	Cornelius V. Whitney	1 1/16	1:44.20	II
1974	Quaze Quilt	William Gavidia	Thomas W. Kelley	Fred W. Hooper	1 1/16	1:46.60	II
1975	Sun and Snow	Garth Patterson	George T. Poole	Cornelius V. Whitney	1 1/16	1:44.60	II
1976	Optimistic Gal	Braulio Baeza	LeRoy Jolley	Diana M. Firestone	1 1/16	1:44.60	II
1977	Sweet Alliance	Chris McCarron	Bud Delp	Windfields Farm	1 1/16	1:43.60	II
1978	White Star Line	Eddie Maple	Woody Stephens	Newstead Farm	1 1/16	1:45.20	I
1979	Davona Dale	Jorge Velásquez	John M. Veitch	Calumet Farm	1 1/16	1:47.20	I
1980	Bold 'n Determined	Ed Delahoussaye	Neil Drysdale	Saron Stable	1 1/16	1:44.80	I
1981	Heavenly Cause	Laffit Pincay Jr.	Woody Stephens	Ryehill Farm	1 1/16	1:43.80	I
1982	Blush With Pride	Bill Shoemaker	D. Wayne Lukas	Stonereath Farms	1 1/8	1:50.20	I
1983	Princess Rooney	Jacinto Vásquez	Frank Gomez	Paula J. Tucker	1 1/8	1:50.80	I
1984	Lucky Lucky Lucky	Ángel Cordero Jr.	D. Wayne Lukas	Leslie Combs II & Equites St.	1 1/8	1:51.80	I
1985	Fran's Valentine	Pat Valenzuela	Joseph Manzi	Earl Scheib	1 1/8	1:50.00	I
1986	Tiffany Lass	Gary Stevens	Laz Barrera	Aaron U. Jones	1 1/8	1:50.60	I
1987	Buryyourbelief	José A. Santos	Laz Barrera	Dana S. Bray Jr.	1 1/8	1:50.40	I
1988	Goodbye Halo	Pat Day	Charlie Whittingham	Arthur B. Hancock III & Alex Campbell Jr.	1 1/8	1:50.40	I
1989	Open Mind	Ángel Cordero Jr.	D. Wayne Lukas	Eugene V. Klein	1 1/8	1:50.60	I
1990	Seaside Attraction	Chris McCarron	D. Wayne Lukas	Overbrook Farm	1 1/8	1:52.80	I
1991	Lite Light	Corey Nakatani	Jerry Hollendorfer	Oaktown Stable	1 1/8	1:48.80	I
1992	Luv Me Luv Me Not	Fabio Arguello Jr.	Glenn Wismer	Philip Maas	1 1/8	1:51.41	I
1993	Dispute	Jerry Bailey	Claude R. McGaughey III	Ogden Mills Phipps	1 1/8	1:52.47	I
1994	Sardula	Ed Delahoussaye	Brian A. Mayberry	Ann & Jerry Moss	1 1/8	1:51.16	I
1995	Gal In A Ruckus	Herb McCauley	John T. Ward Jr.	John C. Oxley	1 1/8	1:50.09	I
1996	Pike Place Dancer	Corey Nakatani	Jerry Hollendorfer	Jerry Hollendorfer & George Todaro	1 1/8	1:49.88	I
1997	Blushing K.D.	Lonnie Meche	Sam David Jr.	James & Sue Burns	1 1/8	1:50.29	I
1998	Keeper Hill	David R. Flores	Robert J. Frankel	John A. Chandler	1 1/8	1:52.06	I
1999	Silverbulletday	Gary Stevens	Bob Baffert	Michael E. Pegram	1 1/8	1:49.92	I
2000	Secret Status	Pat Day	Neil J. Howard	William S. Farish, James A.Elkins Jr., W. Temple Webber Jr.	1 1/8	1:50.30	I
2001	Flute	Jerry Bailey	Robert J. Frankel	Juddmonte Farms	1 1/8	1:48.85	I
2002	Farda Amiga	Chris McCarron	Paulo Lobo	Jose De Camargo, Old Friends Inc. & Winner Silk Inc.	1 1/8	1:50.41	I
2003	Bird Town	Edgar Prado	Nick Zito	Marylou Whitney Stables	1 1/8	1:48.64	I
2004	Ashado	John Velazquez	Todd A. Pletcher	Starlight Stables	1 1/8	1:50.81	I
2005	Summerly	Jerry Bailey	Steven M. Asmussen	Winchell Thoroughbreds	1 1/8	1:50.23	I
2006	Lemons Forever	Mark Guidry	Dallas Stewart	Leon Willis, Terry Horton & Dallas Stewart	1 1/8	1:50.07	I
2007	Rags to Riches	Garrett Gomez	Todd A. Pletcher	Derrick Smith & Michael Tabor	1 1/8	1:49.99	I
2008	Proud Spell	Gabriel Saez	J. Larry Jones	Brereton C. Jones	1 1/8	1:50.01	I
2009	Rachel Alexandra	Calvin Borel	Hal R. Wiggins	Dolphus C. Morrison & Michael Lauffer	1 1/8	1:48.87	I
2010	Blind Luck	Rafael Bejarano	Jerry Hollendorfer	Mark DeDomenico, John Carver, Peter Abruzzo & Jerry Hollendorfer	1 1/8	1:50.70	I
2011	Plum Pretty	Martin Garcia	Bob Baffert	Peachtree Stable	1 1/8	1:49.50	I
2012	Believe You Can	Rosie Napravnik	J. Larry Jones	Brereton C. Jones	1 1/8	1:49.50	I
2013	Princess of Sylmar	Mike E. Smith	Todd A. Pletcher	King of Prussia Stables	1 1/8	1:49.17	I
2014	Untapable	Rosie Napravnik	Steven M. Asmussen	Winchell Thoroughbreds	1 1/8	1:48.68	I
2015	Lovely Maria	Kerwin Clark	J. Larry Jones	Brereton Jones	1 1/8	1:50.45	I
2016	Cathryn Sophia	Javier Castellano	John Servis	Cash Is King Stable	1 1/8	1:50.53	I
2017	Abel Tasman	Mike E. Smith	Bob Baffert	China Horse Club	1 1/8	1:51.62	I
2018	Monomoy Girl	Florent Geroux	Brad H. Cox	Michael Dubb, Monomoy Stables (Sol Kumin), Elkstone Group, Bethlehem Stables (Michael Caruso)	1 1/8	1:49.13	I
2019	Serengeti Empress	José Ortiz	Tom Amoss	Joel Politi	1 1/8	1:50.17	I
2020	Shedaresthedevil	Florent Geroux	Brad H. Cox	Flurry Racing Stables LLC, Qatar Racing Limited, Big Aut Farms	1 1/8	1:48.28	I
2021	Malathaat	John R. Velazquez	Todd A. Pletcher	Shadwell Stable	1 1/8	1:48.99	I
2022	Secret Oath	Luis Saez	D. Wayne Lukas	Briland Farm	1 1/8	1:49.44	I
2023	Pretty Mischievous	Tyler Gaffalione	Brendan Walsh	Godolphin	1 1/8	1:49.77	I
2024	Thorpedo Anna	Brian Hernandez Jr.	Kenny McPeek	Brookdale Racing, Mark Edwards, Judy B. Hicks and Magdalena Racing (Sherri McPeek)	1 1/8	1:50.83	I
2025	Good Cheer	Luis Saez	Brad H. Cox	Godolphin	1 1/8	1:50.15	I
2026	Always a Runner	José Ortiz	Chad C. Brown	Douglas Scharbauer and Three Chimneys Farm, LLC (Goncalo B. Torrealba)	1 1/8	1:48.82	I

== See also ==
- Kentucky Oaks top three finishers
- Road to the Kentucky Oaks
- American thoroughbred racing top attended events
- List of graded stakes at Churchill Downs
- List of attractions and events in the Louisville metropolitan area
- Pink ribbon
