= Equine industry in Kentucky =

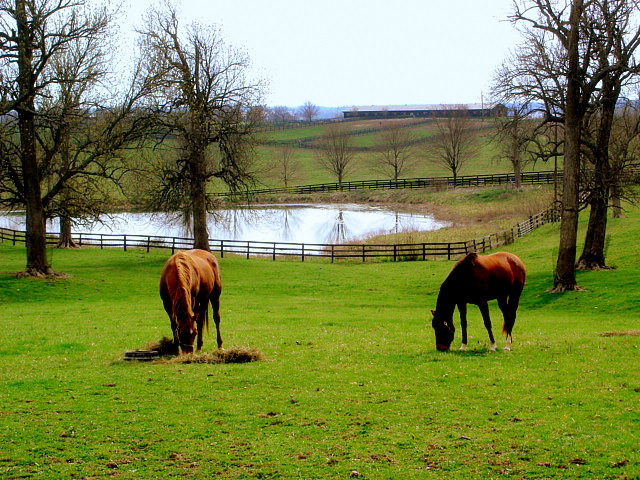
A Kentucky horse farm

The equine industry in Kentucky is a major part of the state's agribusiness, including sectors involved in horse breeding and rearing, racing, buying and selling, and tourism. According to a study by the University of Kentucky, the equine industry contributed $3 billion to the state economy in 2012 and generated 40,665 jobs. Some job estimates range as high as 96,000 when considering secondary impacts such as tourism. Kentucky is the United States' leading producer of horses overall, and the number one producer of Thoroughbreds, with 30% of the national foaling total. In 2009, stud fees and horse sales totaled $4.26 billion, making horses the state's second most profitable agricultural product. Purebred horses exported from Kentucky were worth between approximately 150 and 175 million dollars each year from 2012 to 2015.

In 2010, the Thoroughbred breeding industry alone generated 10,797 jobs, plus an additional 6,860 indirectly related jobs.

== Social status of horses and the horse industry ==
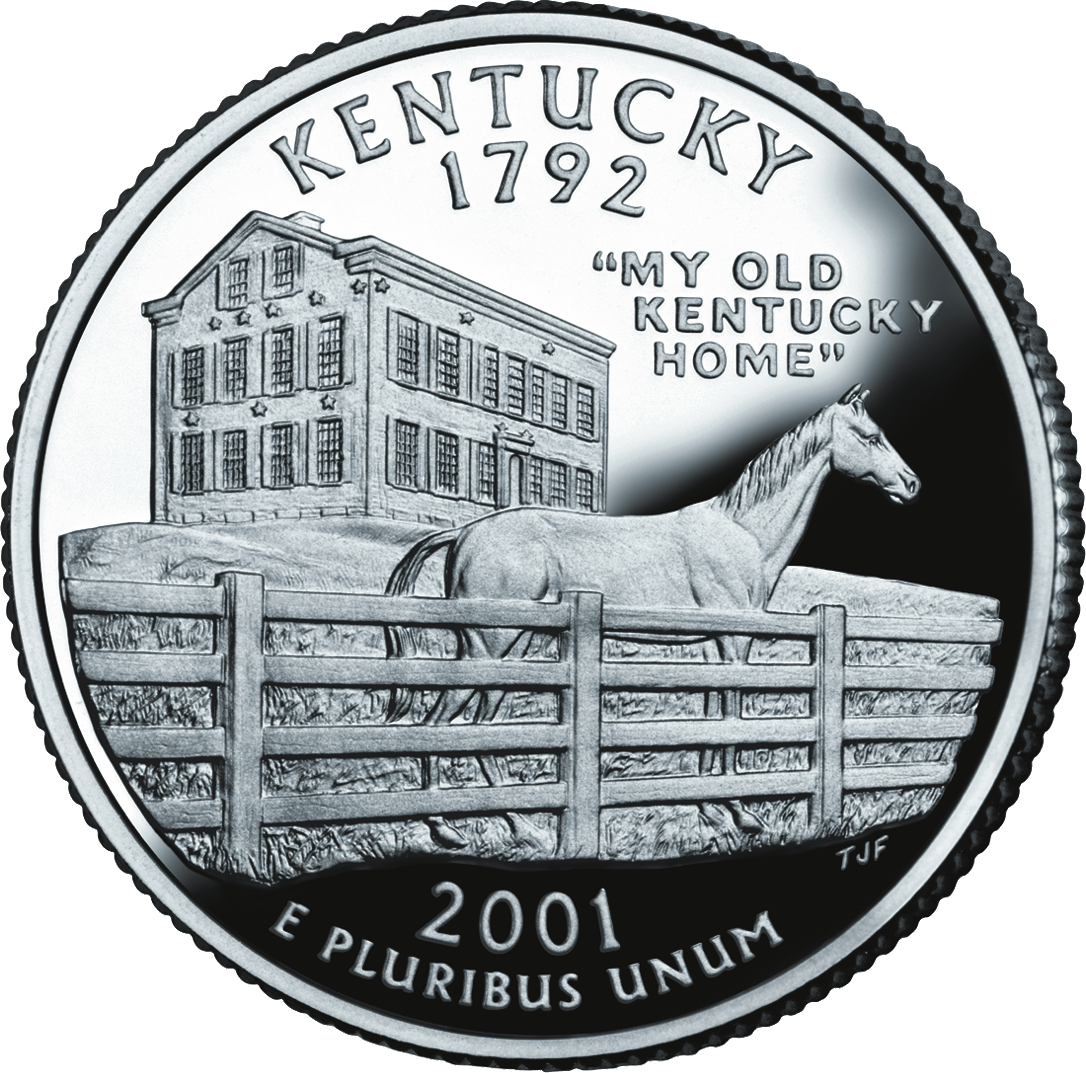
State U.S. Quarter with horse and farm

It is no more possible to go through the Bluegrass country and ignore the horses than it would be to go through Nevada and ignore the slot machines.

— Alistair Cooke

Horses and horse pursuits are strongly linked to Kentucky identity. A horse appears on Kentucky's state quarter and on the standard automobile license plate, selected by a citizen vote, A Kentucky Horse Park specialty license plate with the park's logo resembling the 1963 photograph The Soul of a Horse was the subject of a lawsuit brought by the German photographer who owned rights to the image.

Streets in Danville and Lexington are named after famed racehorses like Cavalcade, Citation and Man o' War.

A study published by the Humane Society concluded that the relatively high horse density for Kentucky's population, 12.9 people per horse, is in part due to the strong "horse-sport-and-socializing legacy" in its region.

== Thoroughbred sales ==
The income generated by Thoroughbred sales is one of the main drivers of the Thoroughbred industry. Keeneland Sales, based at Keeneland racetrack in Lexington, is the largest Thoroughbred auction house in the world. Horses sold by Keeneland won all three Triple Crown races in 2016, with Nyquist taking the Kentucky Derby, Exaggerator the Preakness, and Creator the Belmont. In 2016, Keeneland conducted three auctions that generated $523,566,500 from the sale of 6,485 horses. The September yearling sale represents the sale of horses from the breeding farms to race horse owners. In 2016, 2,792 yearlings were sold for a total cost of $272,890,500. The November breeding stock sale handles mares retiring from the racetrack, stock dispersals that occur when an owner leaves the business, and sales of older mares, often already in foal, between breeders. Weanlings are also sold at the November sales. In 2016, the November auction sold 2,653 horses for a total of $215,213,000. Sales figures vary greatly according to the economy. For example, total sales in 2007 were $815 million, but fell to only $396 million by 2009.

Fasig-Tipton, based in Lexington since 1972, also conducts notable Thoroughbred sales in Kentucky, New York, Florida and Maryland. Like Keeneland, it holds a November sale for breeding stock that in 2016 grossed $54 million from the sale of 88 horses for an average of $615,364. Horses sold included Love the Chase, the dam of California Chrome, and multiple Grade I winners Curalina and Stopchargingmaria.

== Notable farms ==
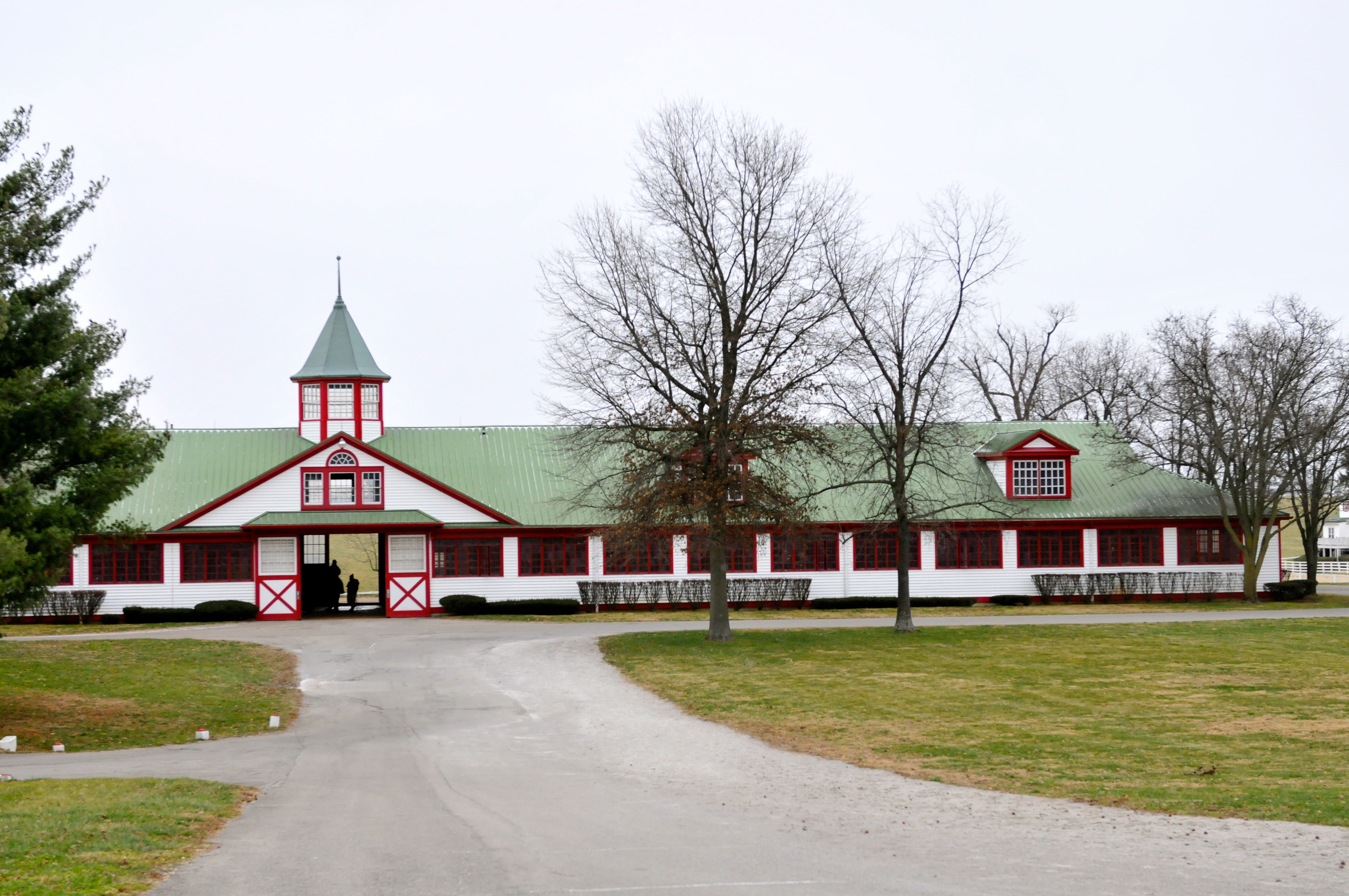
Calumet Farm

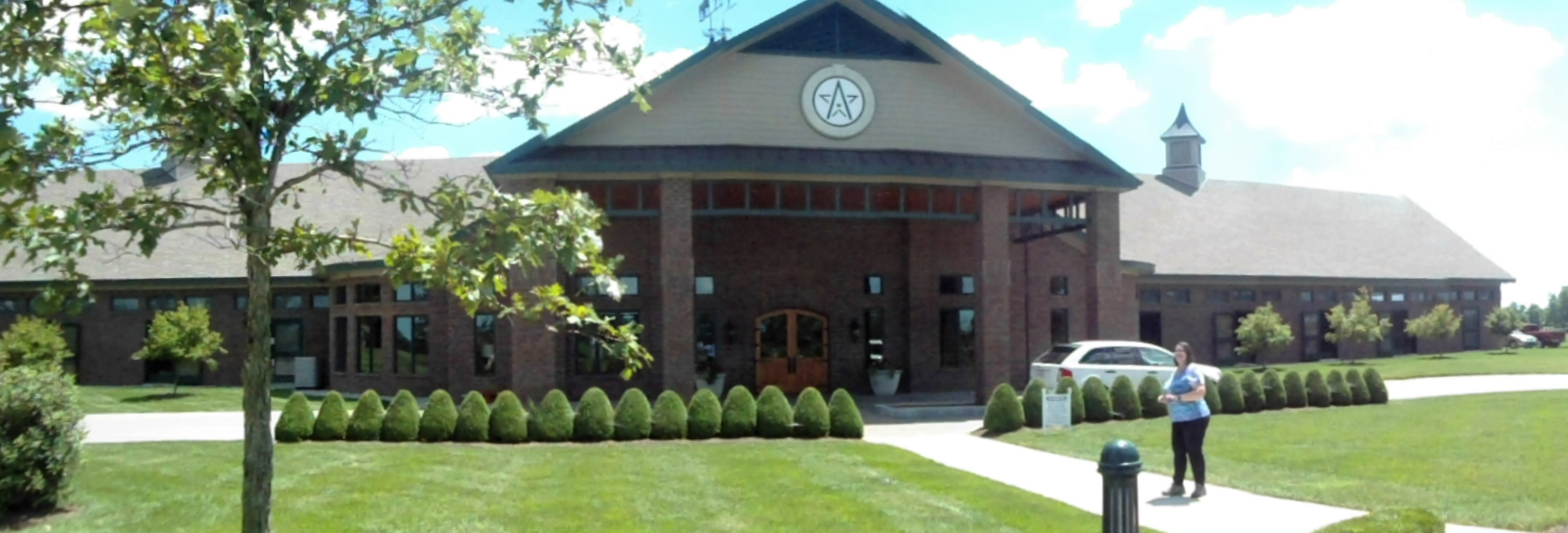
WinStar Farm's stallion barn

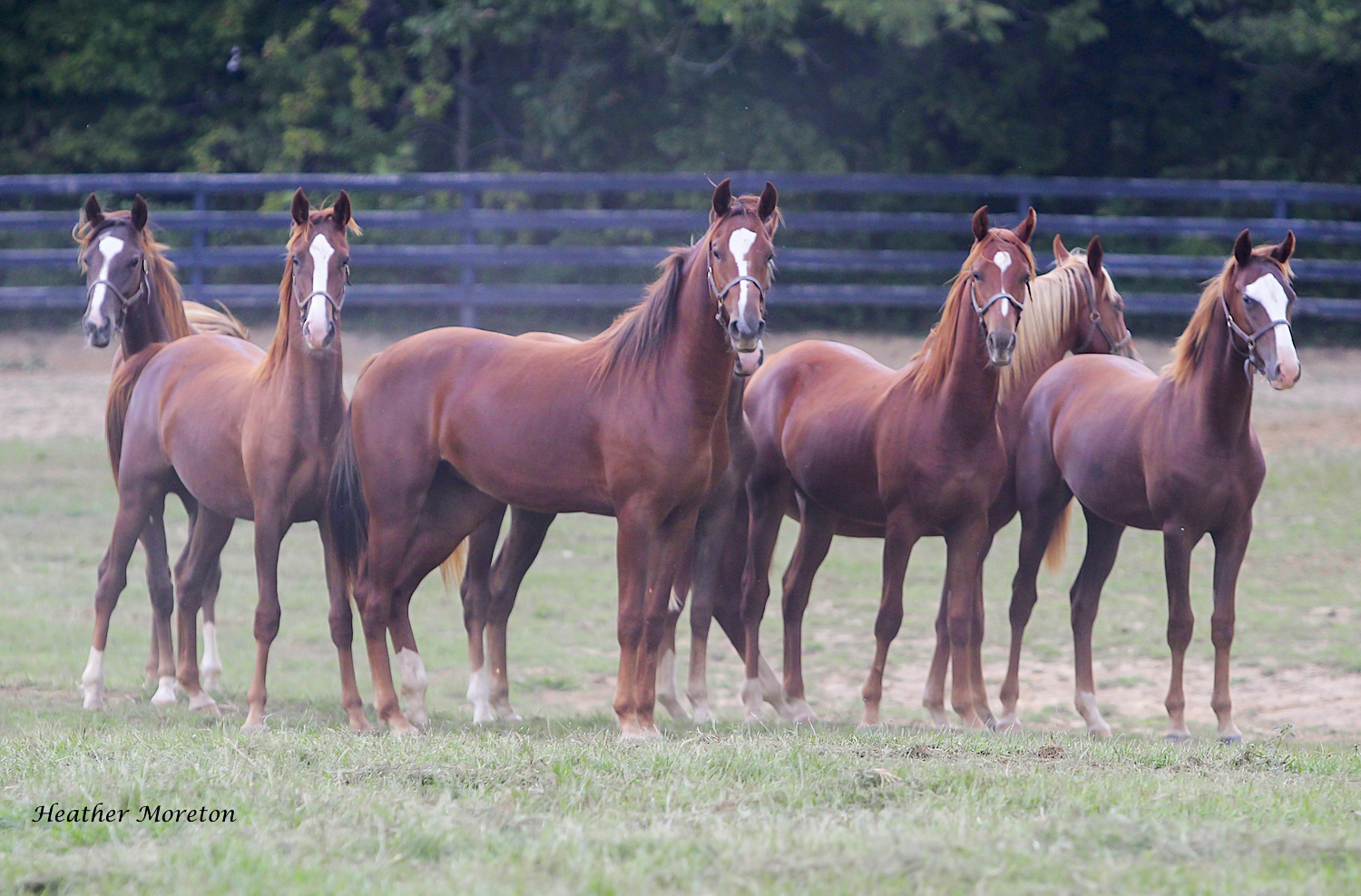
Saddlebred yearlings at Willowbrook Farm

There are about 450 horse farms in the Bluegrass region. The majority of leading Thoroughbred sires in North America stand at stud farms in Kentucky – for example, the top 10 sires in North America for 2015 all stood in the state for fees ranging up to $300,000 per live foal. About 30% of the resultant foals are born out of state and thus are not considered Kentucky-bred. Notable Thoroughbred farms in Kentucky include:

- Adena Springs – winner of multiple Eclipse Awards for outstanding breeder. Home to Medaglia d'Oro, sire of Rachel Alexandra and Songbird
- Ashford Stud – North American branch of the Coolmore Stud. Stallions include Triple Crown winners American Pharoah and Justify
- Calumet Farm – leading stable of the mid-20th century whose champions included Triple Crown winners Whirlaway and Citation. Current stallions include Preakness Stakes winner Oxbow.
- Claiborne Farm – owned by the Hancock family for over a century. Has been home to multiple champions including Secretariat and his sire Bold Ruler. Current stallions include War Front and Blame
- Jonabell Farm – the Kentucky branch of the Darley Stud
- Gainesway Farm – home to leading sire Tapit; notable for round barns and for being the first horse farm also certified as an arboretum by American Public Gardens Association
- Hill 'n' Dale Farms – stallions include two-time Horse of the Year Curlin
- Juddmonte Farms
- Lane's End Farm – was home to Horse of the Year and leading sire A.P. Indy. Current stallions include two of his best sons, Mineshaft and Honor Code
- Mill Ridge Farm – home to Sir Ivor–the first American-bred sold at public auction to win the Epsom Derby–and 36 Grade 1 Winners since 2000.
- Runnymede Farm, founded 1867, perhaps the oldest farm continuously raising Thoroughbreds in Kentucky; bred Kentucky Derby winners Agile and Count Turf
- Spendthrift Farm – has been home to nine Kentucky Derby winners. At one time the farm has had 200 broodmares and 30 stud stallions. Currently home to 2019 leading sire Into Mischief
- Taylor Made Farm
- Three Chimneys Farm – was home to Triple Crown winner Seattle Slew
- WinStar Farm

Although Kentucky is most commonly associated with Thoroughbreds, it is also the home to horse farms for many other breeds. Notable Standardbred farms in Kentucky include Walnut Hall Farm, established around 1900, and Brittany Farms, which dates back to the early 1800s. The American Saddlebred, a breed used for show and pleasure riding, was developed in Kentucky. Many farms are centered around Shelbyville, the "American Saddlebred Capital of the World".

=== Architecture ===
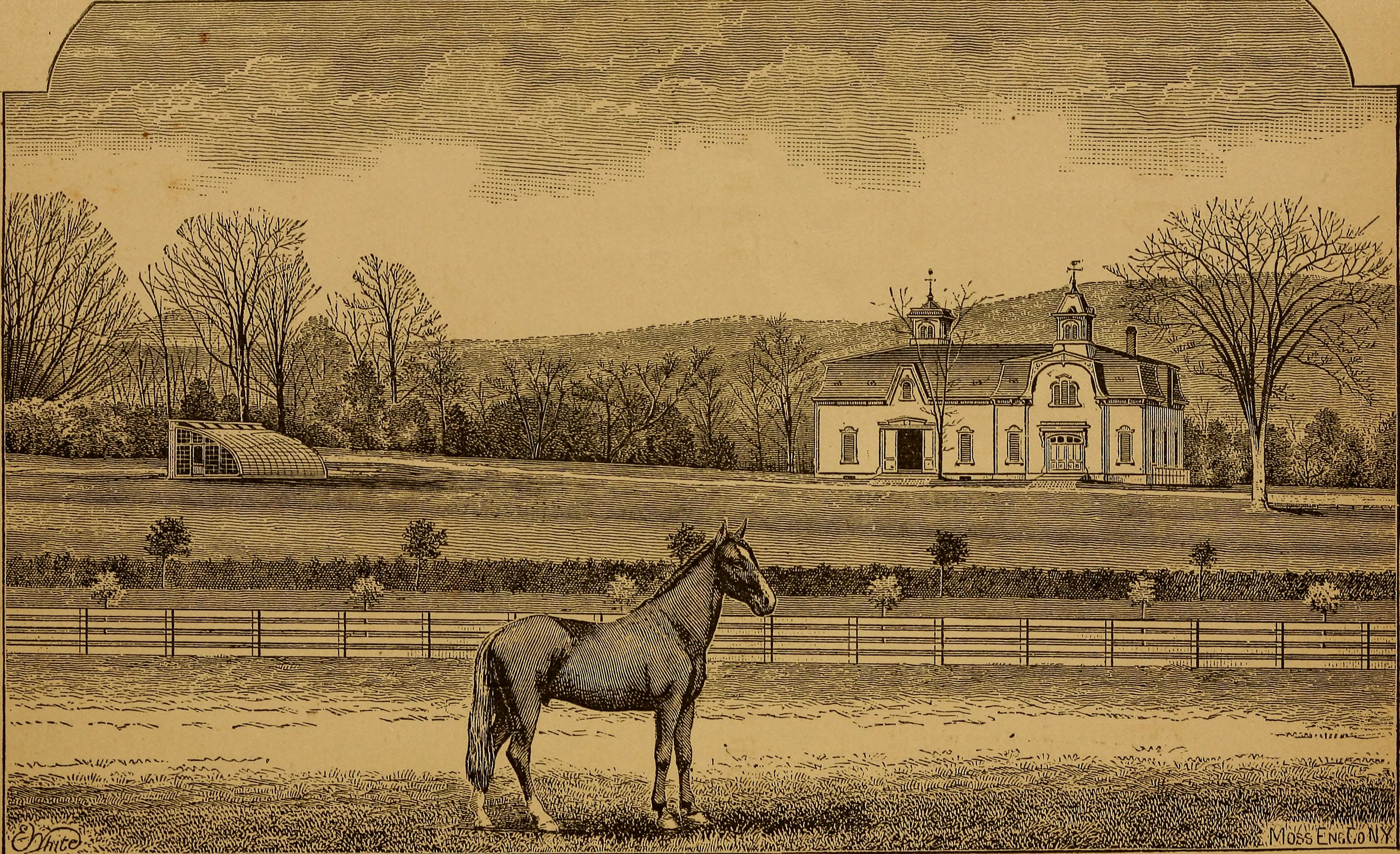
Horse barn at South Elkhorn Stock Farm (1880)

Gentleman farmers began building dedicated horse barns on scientific principles in the 1830s, which was taken up more widely on working farms before the Civil War. Original designs were utilitarian, but the architecture became more elaborate after the war. Barns, described as "palaces" or "cathedrals" can have cupolas, clerestories, and other ornamentation. The stallion barn is typically the most complex building to support the maintenance of the often temperamental horses, accommodate clients who wish to inspect them, and provide access for visiting mares. The stalls are roomy, well lit and have sturdy walls, usually made of wood which is more forgiving if the horse kicks. The aisles are very wide to minimize the potential for a stallion who is being led out of the stable to bite or kick at another, a somewhat common behavior during breeding season. Stall fronts are usually covered in bars or mesh to allow ventilation and permit the horses to see each other. The footing is designed to minimize the risk of slipping. Artificial lighting is commonly used in winter months to enhance semen production for the breeding season that starts in February. In 2013, WinStar Farm spent over $5 million to build an 18-stall stallion barn and the adjacent breeding shed from brick and stone, with state-of-the-art equipment and security features. Some farms such as Claiborne retain their historic wooden barns, relying on reputation and long-term relationships with other breeders.

=== Pastures and fencing ===
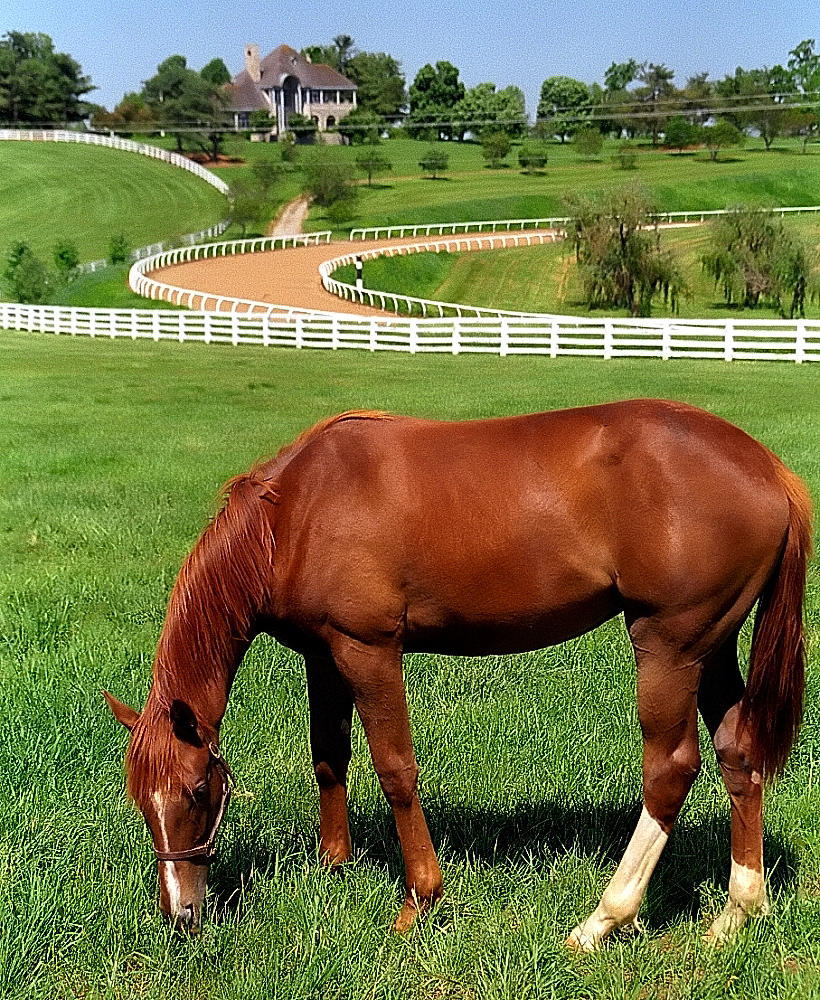
Donamaire Farm's paddocks are enclosed with white fencing

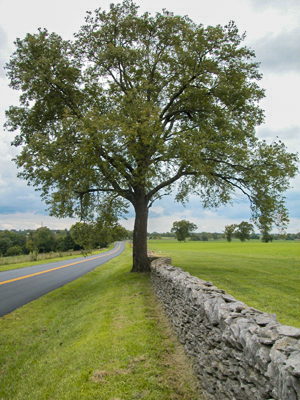
Rock fences are common in the Bluegrass

Central Kentucky is considered an excellent place to raise horses because limestone is so common in the area. Limestone provides the soil with the nutrients to support the lush bluegrass on which the horses graze. "Not all grass is created equal," said Steve Stewart, a Standardbred breeder. "People don't realize how good our grass is until they go somewhere else."

Fencing is a major expense of a horse farm, with wooden fences costing roughly $18,000 per mile to build, plus significant maintenance costs. Calumet Farm alone has roughly 35 miles (56 km) of fencing, painted in the traditional white. Black wooden fencing is becoming more common because the cost of painting is significantly lower. At the major Thoroughbred stud farms, each stallion has a separate paddock located close to the stallion barn. Double fencing is used to provide separation between each stallion, as they can become quite territorial. Mares are kept in separate barns and are turned out to pasture in groups of varying sizes. Weanlings and yearlings also have their own barns and are turned out in their own pastures as much as possible. As a rule of thumb, pastures are sized to provide roughly 2 1/2 acres of grazing per horse.

Another feature of the Bluegrass region is rock walls built by Irish stonemasons from limestone starting in the 1830s. The rock walls, though expensive, are still common along roadways.

== Horse racing ==
Horse racing in Kentucky began on farms and private tracks in the 18th century. Racing in Lexington started in 1787. Today, Thoroughbred horse racing is the predominant type. Built in 1828, the Lexington Association Track was the first in the state to use written rules. Racing in the state is overseen by the Kentucky Horse Racing Commission.

As of 2016, Kentucky has five Thoroughbred racing tracks:

- Churchill Downs, in Louisville. Home of the Kentucky Derby and many other important races
- Ellis Park, in Henderson
- Keeneland Race Course, in Lexington. Hosts meets in spring and fall. Also hosts the Keeneland sales
- Kentucky Downs, in Franklin
- Turfway Park, near Florence

Kentucky also has three harness racing tracks:

- Bluegrass Downs in Paducah
- The Red Mile in Lexington. Home of the Kentucky Futurity, part of trotting's Triple Crown
- Thunder Ridge Raceway in Prestonsburg

== Events and competitions ==
Notable equine events in Kentucky include:

- Tennessee Walking Horse National Celebration
- Rolex Kentucky Three Day Event
- Alltech National Horse Show

== Agritourism ==
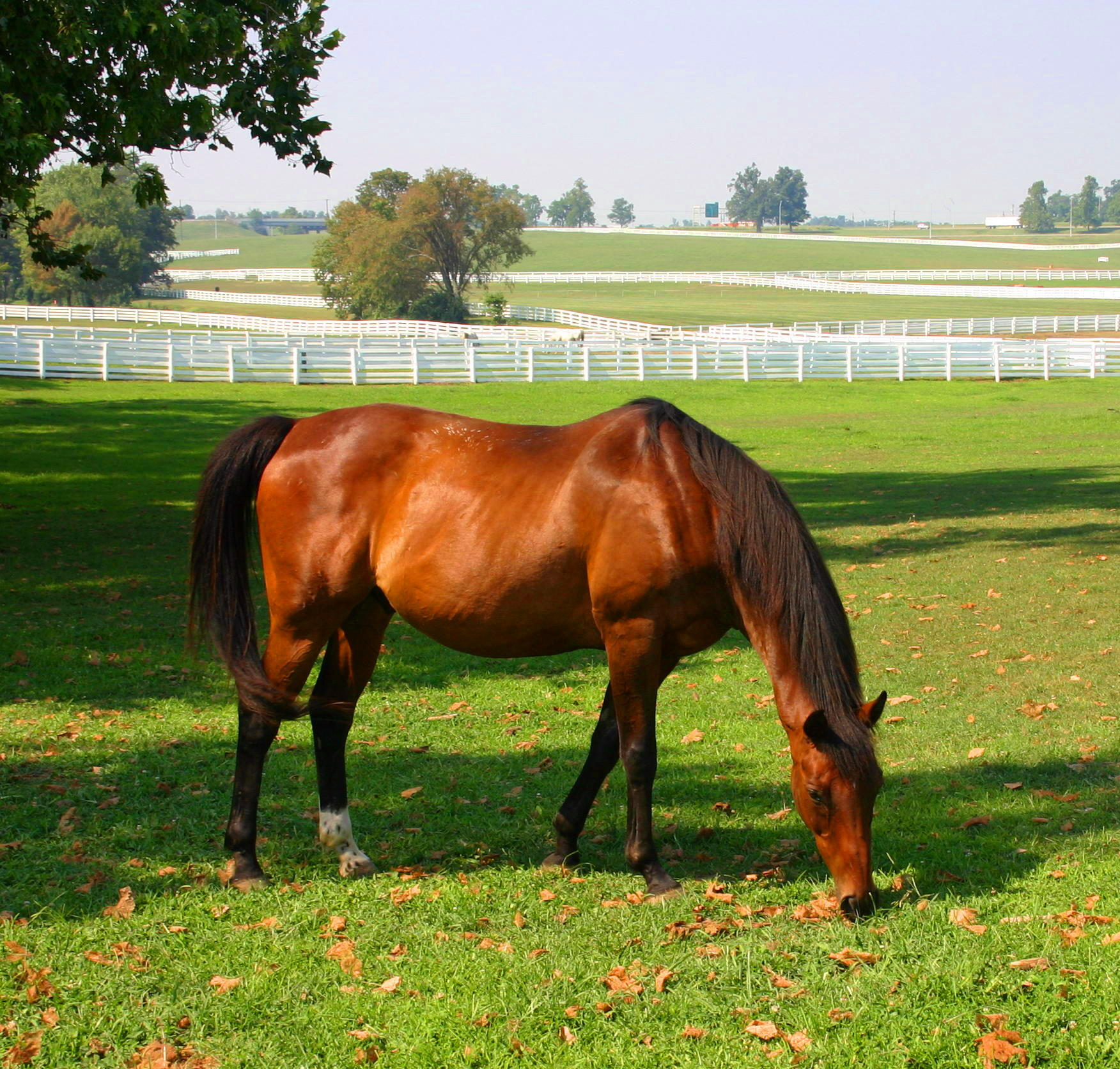
Kentucky Horse Park

The Lexington area has farms where visitors can meet many Kentucky Derby winners and champions that have entered stud, including American Pharoah. There are also several Thoroughbred retirement farms, most notably Old Friends Equine whose retirees include Derby winner Silver Charm. Visitors can arrange a visit to many farms on their own, or use one of many Kentucky-based agritourism companies, or even hire individual tour guides who specialize in horse farms. Access to some horses may be restricted, especially to mares in foal, due to the risk of disease transmission.

The increase in agritourism is part of a Horse Country initiative designed to increase fan engagement in the sport of horse racing. Brutus Clay III of Runnymede Farm, an organizer of Horse Country, said, "Why can't we make people fans of the farms by touching them emotionally through sharing our passion, which is truly authentic? ... Kentucky should be all about horses and bourbon. We have something that is at its essence uniquely Kentucky. We can sell that. There's no reason Kentucky can't be the East Coast equivalent of Napa Valley."

Kentucky Horse Park, a working farm and tourist attraction, contributed over 250 million dollars to the Kentucky economy in 2010, with 825,000 visitors. If direct and indirect job creation is counted, including horse-related tourism, Kentucky's horse industry is responsible for up to 100,000 jobs.

== Transportation ==
Individuals wishing to move horses internationally or across state lines into Kentucky may do so with a valid Equine Interstate Movement Permit, also known as a "horse passport".

== See also ==
- Agriculture in Kentucky
