= Rachel's Valentina =

American-bred Thoroughbred racehorse

Rachels Valentina
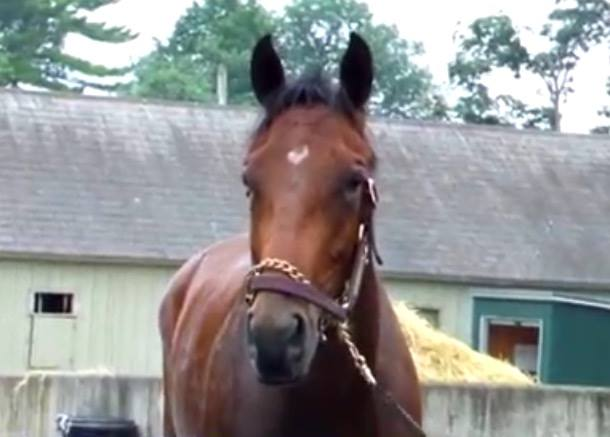
- Rachel's Valentina as a two-year-old at Saratoga
- Sire: Bernardini
- Grandsire: A.P. Indy
- Dam: Rachel Alexandra
- Damsire: Medaglia d'Oro
- Sex: Mare
- Foaled: 2013
- Country: United States
- Colour: Dark Bay
- Breeder: Stonestreet Stables
- Owner: Stonestreet Stables
- Trainer: Todd A. Pletcher
- Record: 6: 2-2-0
- Earnings: US$738,800

Major wins
- Spinaway Stakes (2015)

Rachel's Valentina (foaled February 12, 2013 in Kentucky) is a retired American Thoroughbred racehorse, best known for being the second foal out of the 2009 Horse of the Year Rachel Alexandra. She is also known for winning the grade I Spinaway Stakes as a two-year-old.

== Background ==
Rachel's Valentina is a dark bay mare with a small, heart shaped star on her forehead, and three white socks (one on both hind legs and one on her right front leg). She was bred and raced by Stonestreet Stables, who also raced and owned her dam, Rachel Alexandra. Her sire, 2006 Preakness Stakes winner Bernardini, has also sired grade I winners Stay Thirsty, Alpha, Cavorting, and Greenpointcrusader, among others. Rachel's Valentina holds the distinction of being the only living offspring of two Preakness Stakes winners. She was sent into training with multiple Eclipse Award-winning trainer Todd Pletcher.

== 2015: two-year-old season ==
On August 2, Rachel's Valentina started in a six furlong Maiden Special Weight at Saratoga, with Eclipse Award-winning jockey, John Velasquez up. She was sent off as the even money favorite in the field eight fillies. She started a touch slowly, but moved up quickly on the turn and took the lead in the stretch to win by two lengths, in a time of 1:10.39. It was then announced that she would start in the grade I Spinaway Stakes against a promising field of fillies, including Adirondack Stakes runner-up Tonasah. Velasquez was again aboard her, and she started as the 8-5 favorite. After starting a touch slowly again, she moved up to third, and stalked the leaders until the top of the stretch, when she confronted Constellation for the lead. She then took the lead and won by a length over the fast-closing Tap To It. Her final time for the seven furlongs was 1:23.10. Pletcher stated after the race: "I thought she ran fantastic. Actually, she put herself into the race a little more than I thought she would, but she seemed to be tracking those horses well, and getting a little dirt as well. I felt like, turning for home, knowing her style and watching her train, that she was going to keep coming. I've always felt like the farther she goes, the better she gets, and I think that's proven to be true." Pletcher announced that Rachel's Valentina would simply train up to the Breeders' Cup Juvenile Fillies, preferring to skip the final group of prep races with her.

In the Breeders' Cup Juvenile Fillies, she was made the second choice behind the undefeated filly Songbird. Rachel's Valentina broke evenly, and moved up to second, a length behind the front-running Songbird. She stayed in that position until the final turn, when Songbird began to pull away from the rest of the field. Rachel's Valentina was moving well, but was no match for Songbird, finishing five and three-fourths lengths behind her in second.

== 2016: three-year-old season and retirement ==
As a 3 year old, Rachel's Valentina returned in the GI Ashland Stakes after a six-month layoff where she faced then undefeated Cathryn Sophia, Carina Mia, Weep No More and Banree. Rachel's Valentina broke a touch slowly while Cathryn Sophia and Carina Mia went to the lead. Rachel's Valentina then moved up and stalked a half length on the outside of Carina Mia with Cathryn Sophia sitting third. The three fillies battled around the turn and into the homestretch. At the top of the stretch Carina Mia gave way Cathryn Sophia had a short lead over Rachel's Valentina, but Rachel's Valentina battled back and took the lead at the 16th pole, but Weep no More at 30/1 made a strong move and passed her in the final strides and won by a neck over Rachel's Valentina. "It was a tough field," Banke said of the Ashland line-up. "They may have moved (on the front end) a little bit sooner than I would have liked them to, but she was coming back off a layoff. It was a good effort. We were watching her closely afterward because she's very special; we don't want to overtax her." As for making her first start in a grade I off more than a five-month layoff and then heading to the Oaks, Banke said: "We thought she was a little light going into the Breeders' Cup and we wanted to have for the summer and later in the fall," she said. "We wanted to make sure she was 150% before we put her back in training. So we didn't feel the need to bring her back early. We actually weren't even planning on the Oaks, but she's put herself there." Rachel's Valentina finished 6th in the GI Kentucky Oaks. After a good rest following an uncharacteristic run in the May 6 Kentucky Oaks, Rachel's Valentina's next start was the GI Mother Goose. She was hit and stumbled badly at the start and was never a factor finishing 5th, her trainer Todd Pletcher stated after the race : "I really don't have a great explanation (for Rachel's Valentina)," Pletcher said: "It looked like she was in a decent spot, but Johnny seemed like he had to start asking her for a lot earlier than you would expect him to. We'll see how she comes out of it and try to regroup." Rachel's Valentina was pointing to the GI Test Stakes on August 6, but instead she retired. On Stonestreet Farms website it said Rachel's Valentina "will now retire from racing, sound and injury-free."

== As a broodmare ==
Rachel's Valentina gave birth to her first foal on February 18, 2018, a bay colt by Curlin with a star and two socks on his hind legs. He was named Alejandro in 2020. Rachel's Valentina then visited Pioneerof the Nile, and on April 4, 2019, she gave birth to a bay filly with a star an snip. In 2019 she was re-bred to Curlin and was confirmed to be in foal on November 30, 2019.

She produced a colt by Into Mischief in 2022, and a filly by Quality Road in 2023.

== Race record ==
Date	Track	Race	Grade	Distance	Finish	Time
8/2/2015	Saratoga Race Course	Maiden	Maiden	6 furlongs	1st	1:10.39
9/5/2015	Saratoga Race Course	Spinaway Stakes	I	7 furlongs	1st	1:23.10
10/31/2015	Keeneland	Breeders Cup Juvenile Fillies	I	1 1 /16 miles	2nd	1:42.73
4/9/2016	Keeneland	Ashland Stakes	I	1 1/16 miles	2nd	1:43.57
5/6/2016	Churchill Downs	Kentucky Oaks	I	1 1/8 miles	6th	1:50.53
7/2/2016	Belmont Park	Mother Goose Stakes	I	1 1/16 miles	5th	1:41.01

== Pedigree ==
Pedigree of Rachel's Valentina
Sire Bernardini dkb/br. 2003	A. P. Indy b. 1989	Seattle Slew b. 1974	Bold Reasoning
Sire Bernardini dkb/br. 2003	A. P. Indy b. 1989	Seattle Slew b. 1974	My Charmer
Sire Bernardini dkb/br. 2003	A. P. Indy b. 1989	Weekend Surprise b. 1980	Secretariat
Sire Bernardini dkb/br. 2003	A. P. Indy b. 1989	Weekend Surprise b. 1980	Lassie Dear
Sire Bernardini dkb/br. 2003	Cara Rafaela b. 1980	Quiet American b. 1986	Fappiano
Sire Bernardini dkb/br. 2003	Cara Rafaela b. 1980	Quiet American b. 1986	Demure
Sire Bernardini dkb/br. 2003	Cara Rafaela b. 1980	Oil Fable gr. 1986	Spectacular Bid
Sire Bernardini dkb/br. 2003	Cara Rafaela b. 1980	Oil Fable gr. 1986	Northern Fable
Dam Rachel Alexandra b. 2006	Medaglia d'Oro b. 1999	El Prado b. 1985	Sadler's Wells
Dam Rachel Alexandra b. 2006	Medaglia d'Oro b. 1999	El Prado b. 1985	Lady Capulet
Dam Rachel Alexandra b. 2006	Medaglia d'Oro b. 1999	Cappucino Bay b. 1989	Bailjumper
Dam Rachel Alexandra b. 2006	Medaglia d'Oro b. 1999	Cappucino Bay b. 1989	Dubbed In
Dam Rachel Alexandra b. 2006	Lotta Kim b. 2001	Roar b. 1993	Forty Niner
Dam Rachel Alexandra b. 2006	Lotta Kim b. 2001	Roar b. 1993	Wild Applause
Dam Rachel Alexandra b. 2006	Lotta Kim b. 2001	Kim's Blues b. 1993	Cure the Blues
Dam Rachel Alexandra b. 2006	Lotta Kim b. 2001	Kim's Blues b. 1993	Early Decision
