= Jonabell Farm =

Coordinates: 38.011852°N 84.605856°W

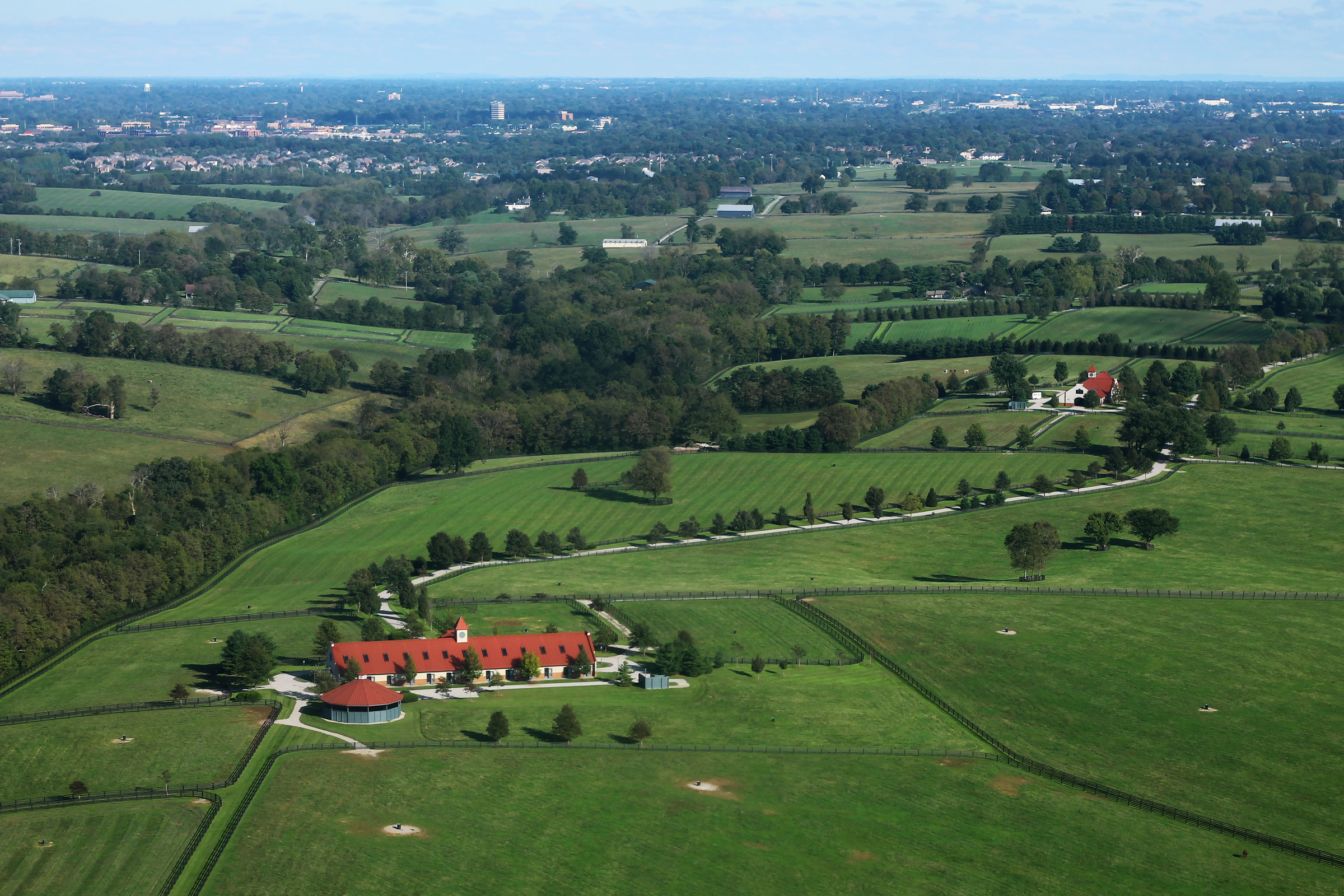
- Buildings at the Jonabell Farm
- Company type: Horse breeding stud farm
- Industry: Thoroughbred horse racing
- Headquarters: 3333 Bowman Mill Rd; Lexington, Kentucky
- Key people: John and Jessica Bell (founding owners); Mohammed bin Rashid Al Maktoum (current owner)
- Website: http://www.darleyamerica.com/

Jonabell Farm is an 800-acre Thoroughbred breeding farm located in Lexington, Kentucky. It was founded in 1954 by John A. Bell and his wife Jessica. It was sold in 2001 to Mohammed bin Rashid Al Maktoum for his Darley Stud American division.

== History ==
John and Jessica Bell founded Jonabell Farm in 1946 at Hamburg Place, then relocated to Bowman Mill Road in Lexington in 1954.

The farm stands on what was part of the nearly 8,000 acres granted to Abraham Bowman, a veteran of the American Revolutionary War. Keeneland racetrack was later built on the site of Bowman's plantation. The land that eventually became Jonabell Farm contains Bowman Cabin, built in 1799. The original stone water tower also still stands.

Under the Bells, the farm produced over 200 stakes winners, 14 of those champions, including Damascus, Epitome, and the first American-bred to win The Derby, Never Say Die. Stallions that have stood at the farm include Triple Crown winner Affirmed, leading sire Smart Strike and Horse of the Year Holy Bull. Affirmed is buried on the farm.

In 2001, the Bells decided to sell the farm as a "pro-active approach to estate planning". Mohammed bin Rashid Al Maktoum purchased the farm for his Darley Stud American division for an undisclosed price estimated to be as high as $15.8 million. It is now the core of Darley America and is known as Darley at Jonabell Farm or Darley's Jonabell Farm. In 2003, the stallion complex was redesigned with the focal point being the grave and a new statue of Affirmed.

== Stallion roster ==
The current stallion roster features Medaglia d'Oro (the sire of champion fillies Rachel Alexandra and Songbird), the Kentucky Derby and Breeders' Cup Juvenile winner Street Sense, the Kentucky Derby winner Nyquist, the Belmont Stakes and Breeders' Cup Juvenile winner Essential Quality, the Preakness Stakes winner Bernardini, and Metropolitan Handicap winner Frosted who is a Darley homebred.

2017 Stallion Roster
| Name | Birth Year | Pedigree | 2017 Stud Fee ($) | 2016 Fee |
|---|---|---|---|---|
| Medaglia d'Oro | 1999 | El Prado x Cappucino Bay (Bailjumper) | 150,000 | 150,000 |
| Bernardini | 2003 | A.P. Indy x Cara Rafaela (Quiet American) | 100,000 | 100,000 |
| Frosted | 2012 | Tapit x One Fast Cookie (Deputy Minister) | 50,000 | new |
| Hard Spun | 2004 | Danzig x Turkish Tyrst (Turkoman) | 45,000 | 45,000 |
| Street Sense | 2004 | Street Cry x Bedazzle (Dixieland Band) | 45,000 | 45,000 |
| Nyquist | 2013 | Uncle Mo x Seeking Gabrielle (Forestry) | 40,000 | new |
| Elusive Quality | 1993 | Gone West x Touch of Greatness (Hero's Honor) | 30,000 | 40,000 |
| Animal Kingdom | 2008 | Leroidesanimaux x Dalicia (Actenago) | 30,000 | 35,000 |
| Street Boss | 2004 | Street Cry x Blushing Ogygian (Ogygian) | 17,500 | 12,500 |
| Girolamo | 2006 | A.P. Indy x Get Lucky (Mr. Prospector) | 10,000 | 15,000 |
| Midshipman | 2006 | Unbridled's Song x Fleet Lady (Avenue of Flags) | 8,500 | 8,500 |

Discreet Cat, who originally stood at Jonabell, was moved to Darley Japan starting in the 2017 season.
