= Havre de Grace =

Havre de Grace may refer to:

- Havre de Grace, Maryland, a city in the United States
- Havre de Grace (horse), a racehorse
- Le Havre, a city in France, formerly named Le Havre-de-Grâce
