= New Orleans Ladies Stakes =

The New Orleans Ladies Stakes is an American Thoroughbred horse race created in 2010 at Fair Grounds Race Course in New Orleans, Louisiana to attract 2009 American Horse of the Year Rachel Alexandra to train and compete there. A $200,000 stakes raced in mid March, it is open to fillies and mares, age three and older. It is contested on dirt at a distance of a mile and a sixteenth (8.5 furlongs).

The name of the race comes from the 1978 song of the same title written by Hoyt Garrick and Leon Medica and originally recorded by Louisiana Music Hall of Fame rock band, LeRoux.

The inaugural running was won by Zardana with Rachel Alexandra finishing second.

The purse for its 2011 running was $100,000. It was raised to $150,000 for 2012.

== Winners ==
Year	Winner	Age	Jockey	Trainer	Owner	Time
2013	Believe You Can	4	Rosie Napravnik	J. Larry Jones	Brereton Jones	1:37.72
2012	Havre de Grace	5	Ramon Dominguez	J. Larry Jones	Fox Hill Farms	1:42.79
2011	Ravi's Song	5	Corey Lanerie	Carl Bowman	Mrs. Yoshio Fujita	1:44.64
2010	Zardana	6	David Flores	John Shirreffs	Arnold Zetcher, LLC	1:43.55
