= Havre de Grace (horse) =

American-bred Thoroughbred racehorse (2007–2023)

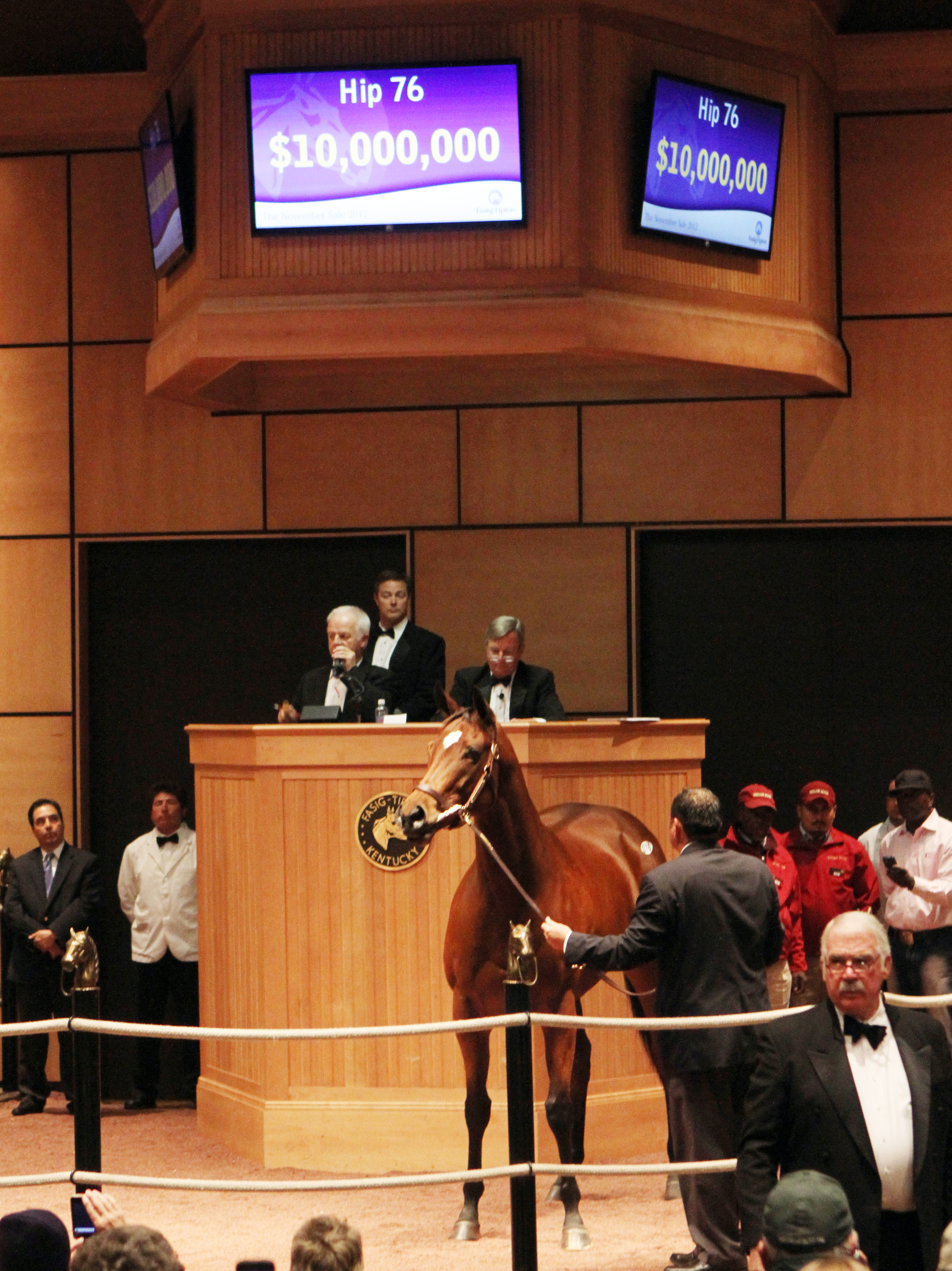
- Havre de Grace at the 2012 Fasig-Tipton sale
- Sire: Saint Liam
- Grandsire: Saint Ballado
- Dam: Easter Bunnette
- Damsire: Carson City
- Sex: Mare
- Foaled: May 12, 2007
- Died: April 30, 2023 (aged 15)
- Country: United States
- Colour: Bay
- Breeder: Nancy S. Dillman
- Owner: Fox Hill Farms, Carcone Holdings
- Trainer: J. Larry Jones
- Record: 16: 9-4-2
- Earnings: $2,586,175

Major wins
- Cotillion Handicap (2010); Azeri Stakes (2011); Apple Blossom Handicap (2011); Obeah Stakes (2011); Woodward Stakes (2011); Beldame Stakes (2011); New Orleans Ladies Stakes (2012) Breeders' Cup placing: Breeders' Cup Ladies' Classic - 3rd (2010); Breeders' Cup Classic - 4th (2011)

Awards
- American Champion Older Female Horse (2011); American Horse of the Year (2011)

Havre de Grace (May 12, 2007 – April 30, 2023) was an American Thoroughbred racehorse who was bred in Kentucky and was 2011 American Horse of the Year. During her racing career, she was owned by Fox Hill Farms and trained by J. Larry Jones. Her sire was the 2005 American Horse of the Year, Saint Liam. Her dam was the mare Easter Bunnette, a daughter of Carson City. Her name derived from the city and racetrack of Havre de Grace, Maryland.

== Racing career ==
=== 2009: two-year-old season ===
Based at Delaware Park in Stanton, Delaware, Havre de Grace made her career debut under the care of trainer Anthony W. Dutrow, finishing third in a one-mile maiden race for two-year-old fillies on August 24. She broke her maiden in her second start on September 30, a one-mile and 70 yards maiden event. She was then rested for her three-year-old campaign in 2010.

=== 2010: three-year-old season ===
Havre de Grace made the first start of her three-year-old campaign by winning a one-mile allowance race at Delaware Park on May 10. She then finished second in the ungraded Go For Wand Stakes on June 5 in preparation for the July 10 Delaware Oaks, where she was beaten a nose while finishing second to Blind Luck in the first of several meetings between the fillies. She finished second again to Blind Luck, this time by a neck, in her first start away from her hometrack in the August 21 Alabama Stakes at Saratoga Race Course in Saratoga Springs, New York, before besting her newfound rival by the same margin in the October 2 Cotillion Handicap at Parx Casino and Racing in Bensalem, Pennsylvania. She ended her three-year-old campaign with a third-place finish behind Unrivaled Belle and Blind Luck in the November 5 Breeders' Cup Ladies Classic at Churchill Downs in Louisville, Kentucky. This was her first start against older fillies and mares. Afterwards, she was rested for her four-year-old campaign in 2011.

=== 2011: four-year-old season ===
Under the care of her new trainer, J. Larry Jones, Havre de Grace made her four-year-old debut in the Azeri Stakes on March 19 at Oaklawn Park in Hot Springs, Arkansas, with a victory over her archrival, Blind Luck. This was the fifth straight meeting between the two fillies. She then garnered her first Grade 1 victory with a win in the April 15 Apple Blossom Handicap, also at Oaklawn. After her win in the Apple Blossom, Havre de Grace returned to her hometrack, Delaware Park, and scored a victory in the Obeah Stakes. She then faced off with Blind Luck for the sixth time in the July 16 Grade II Delaware Handicap, finishing second by a nose after a prolonged stretch battle while giving away two pounds. The third-place finisher, 2010 Delaware Handicap winner Life at Ten, was eighteen lengths further back in third.

After that defeat, Havre de Grace made her first start against males in the Grade I Woodward Stakes on September 3 at Saratoga. She was sent off as the favorite and won by 1 1/2 lengths over Flat Out, joining the 2009 American Horse of the Year, Rachel Alexandra, as the only female horses to win the race. Her Woodward victory was followed by the October 1 Grade I Beldame Stakes at Belmont Park in Elmont, New York, in which she scored by 8 1/4 lengths over eventual Breeders' Cup Ladies' Classic winner Royal Delta. Havre de Grace closed out her 2011 campaign in the Breeders' Cup Classic on November 5, 2011, at Churchill Downs where she was again pitted against male horses. However, she fell short in her attempt to join Zenyatta in becoming only the second female racehorse to win the richest horse race in North America, finishing fourth behind the winner, Drosselmeyer. Despite her Breeders' Cup defeat, voters considered her accomplishments worthy enough to crown her as American Horse of the Year. She became the third straight filly or mare to win horse racing's top honor (following Rachel Alexandra in 2009 and Zenyatta in 2010).

== Retirement ==
On November 5, 2012, Havre de Grace was sold in the Fasig Tipton November Sale in Lexington, Kentucky, by Taylor Made Sales Agency. She was labeled as Hip #76 and sold for $10 million. Mandy Pope, Whisper Hill Farm, of Citra, Florida, was the high bidder and boarded Havre de Grace at Wayne and Cathy Sweezey's Timber Town Stable in Lexington, Ky. Havre de Grace was bred to Tapit in 2013. Sweezey explained, "Having a mare like Havre de Grace in [Mandy Pope's] broodmare band, she is looking forward to trying to make money with the horse and maybe even racing a few out of her, and having that ilk of genetics. Really, she understands that the chances of making that kind of money back are slim. With that being said, when I presented [Irish-based] Galileo to her, we talked about it at length, and she came back and said, 'You know, it makes perfect sense from a business standpoint, but for me, I want to be able to come to the farm and pet my mare that I paid $10-million for, and I want to feed her carrots and watch her babies be born. That's why I'm in this game, because I really love the horses.'"

On February 7, 2014, Havre de Grace produced her first foal, a filly by Tapit named Heavenly Grace, who earned her first victory on May 27, 2018. Graceful Princess, her second filly by Tapit foaled in 2016, won in her first start on September 2, 2018.

=== Death ===
Havre de Grace died in the early morning hours of April 30, 2023. Wayne Sweezey, who boarded Havre de Grace at his Timber Town Farm, confirmed that the 16-year-old mare hemorrhaged multiple times, and died after producing a colt by Into Mischief the afternoon of April 28, 2023. Thoroughbred Daily News confirms that the foal, an orphaned male, has found a nurse mare, has accepted her and appears to be progressing well.

== Pedigree ==
Pedigree of Havre de Grace, Bay mare, 2007
Sire Saint Liam 2000	Saint Ballado; 1989	Halo	Hail to Reason
Sire Saint Liam 2000	Saint Ballado; 1989	Halo	Cosmah
Sire Saint Liam 2000	Saint Ballado; 1989	Ballade	Herbager
Sire Saint Liam 2000	Saint Ballado; 1989	Ballade	Miss Swapsco
Sire Saint Liam 2000	Quiet Dance; 1993	Quiet American	Fappiano
Sire Saint Liam 2000	Quiet Dance; 1993	Quiet American	Demure
Sire Saint Liam 2000	Quiet Dance; 1993	Misty Dancer	Lyphard
Sire Saint Liam 2000	Quiet Dance; 1993	Misty Dancer	Flight Dancer
Dam Easter Bunnette 1998	Carson City; 1987	Mr Prospector	Raise A Native
Dam Easter Bunnette 1998	Carson City; 1987	Mr Prospector	Gold Digger
Dam Easter Bunnette 1998	Carson City; 1987	Blushing Promise	Blushing Groom
Dam Easter Bunnette 1998	Carson City; 1987	Blushing Promise	Summertime Promise
Dam Easter Bunnette 1998	Toll Free; 1985	Topsider	Northern Dancer
Dam Easter Bunnette 1998	Toll Free; 1985	Topsider	Drumtop
Dam Easter Bunnette 1998	Toll Free; 1985	Toll Booth	Buckpasser
Dam Easter Bunnette 1998	Toll Free; 1985	Toll Booth	Missy Baba (family 3-l)

Havre de Grace is inbred 5 X 3 to Mr. Prospector and 5 X 4 to Northern Dancer.
