= Medaglia d'Oro (horse) =

American-bred Thoroughbred racehorse (1999–2026)

- Sire: El Prado
- Grandsire: Sadler's Wells
- Dam: Cappucino Bay
- Damsire: Bailjumper
- Sex: Stallion
- Foaled: April 11, 1999; Paris, Kentucky, U.S.
- Died: October 16, 2026 (aged 27); Lexington, Kentucky, U.S.
- Country: United States
- Colour: Dark bay/Brown
- Breeder: Albert and Joyce Bell
- Owner: Joyce Bell; Edmund A. Gand
- Trainer: Robert J. Frankel
- Record: 17: 8-7-0
- Earnings: $5,754,720

Major wins
- San Felipe Stakes (2002); Jim Dandy Stakes (2002); Travers Stakes (2002); Whitney Handicap (2003); Oaklawn Handicap (2003); Strub Stakes (2003); Donn Handicap (2004)

Medaglia d'Oro (April 11, 1999 – October 16, 2026) was an American Thoroughbred racehorse who won several major stakes races including the 2002 Travers Stakes and the 2003 Whitney Handicap. He also finished second in the 2002 Belmont Stakes, the Breeders' Cup Classic in both 2002 and 2003, and the 2004 Dubai World Cup. After retiring to stud, he had become an excellent stallion whose progeny include 2009 Horse of the Year Rachel Alexandra, two-time champion filly Songbird and three-time Hong Kong Horse of the Year Golden Sixty.

== Background ==
Medaglia d'Oro was a dark bay or brown stallion with a white star and three white socks. He was bred by Albert and Joyce Bell of Great Falls, Montana, and foaled on April 11, 1999, at Katalpa Farm in Paris, Kentucky. His sire was Ireland's 1991 Champion 2-Year-Old, El Prado, who was a son of the fourteen-time leading sire in Great Britain and Ireland Sadler's Wells, who in turn was a son of the 20th century's most influential sire and sire of sires, Northern Dancer. El Prado was the first son of Sadler's Wells to establish himself in the United States, becoming the leading sire in North America in 2002. However, the dam's side of his pedigree is less distinguished. His dam, Cappuccino Bay, won a minor stakes race but then descended into the claiming ranks. Her sire, Bailjumper, was not a success at stud, though he was a son of Hall of Fame inductee Damascus. Her family had failed to produce a major winner in several generations.

As a yearling in 2000, Medaglia d'Oro was sent to a ranch in Arizona where he learned the basics of being a racehorse under the care of Raland Ayers. "He was just a pro from day one", said Ayers. "The first time I galloped him, he went between two horses like he'd been doing it all his life. I've never been around a horse with that much class." In May 2001, Medaglia d'Oro returned to Kentucky where he was placed in trainer David Vance's stable at Churchill Downs.

Medaglia d'Oro has been described as an attractive horse with excellent conformation. He stood at 16.2 hands (66 inches, 168 cm) high.

== Racing career ==
Medaglia d'Oro finished second in his only race as a two-year-old in 2001. After his winning three-year-old debut, he was sold to Edmund Gann and transferred to trainer Robert J. Frankel.

Leading up to the 2002 Triple Crown, Medaglia d'Oro won the San Felipe Stakes in California then finished second in the Wood Memorial in New York. In the 1 1/4 mile Kentucky Derby, he was ridden by Laffit Pincay Jr. to a fourth-place finish behind War Emblem. Ridden by Jerry Bailey in the 1 3/16 mile Preakness Stakes, he ran eighth behind War Emblem, then with Kent Desormeaux as his jockey, he finished second in the 1 1/2 mile Belmont Stakes, beaten by long-shot Sarava.

After a brief rest, Medaglia d'Oro returned in early August to win the Jim Dandy Stakes at Saratoga Race Course by 13 3/4 lengths under jockey Jerry Bailey, who would ride him in all his subsequent starts. In the Jim Dandy, Medaglia d'Oro earned a career high Beyer Speed Figure of 120. He then won the Travers Stakes at Saratoga Race Course, before running second to Volponi in the 2002 Breeders' Cup Classic. Medaglia d'Oro finished second to War Emblem in the Eclipse Award for champion three-year-old of 2002.

Medaglia d'Oro started his four-year-old campaign with a seven-length victory in the Strub Stakes in February at Santa Anita, then won the Oaklawn Handicap in April by 2 3/4 lengths. After a rest, he returned to win the Whitney Handicap by a length over Volponi, becoming the first horse to win Saratoga's Jim Dandy, Travers and Whitney. He then ran second to Candy Ride in the Pacific Classic and to Pleasantly Perfect in the 2003 Breeders' Cup Classic. Sent back to the track in 2004, the five-year-old Medaglia d'Oro raced twice. He won January's Grade I Donn Handicap at Gulfstream Park in Florida, then at the end of March, he finished second to Pleasantly Perfect in the Dubai World Cup at Nad Al Sheba Racecourse in the United Arab Emirates.

== Stud record ==
In May 2004, Medaglia d'Oro was sold to Richard Haisfield, who retired him to stud duty in 2005 at Hill 'n' Dale Farms for a fee of $35,000. In 2006, Medaglia d'Oro was moved to Audrey Haisfield's newly completed Stonewall Stallions, where he stood through 2009. His fee increased to $40,000 in 2007, then $60,000 in 2009. From his first crop born in 2006, he produced several stakes winners, the most notable of which was Rachel Alexandra, who was the 2009 Horse of the Year. As a result of this success, he was purchased by Sheikh Mohammed's Darley Stud for an undisclosed price in 2009.

Starting in the summer of 2010, Medaglia d'Oro was shuttled to Australia for the southern hemisphere's breeding season. His first Australian crop was only moderately successful, but his second Australian crop included Vancouver, who won the Golden Slipper Stakes and was named Australia's champion two-year-old of 2014–5. For the 2015 season in Australia, his fee increased to A$110,000.

In 2016, his fee in North America was increased to $150,000 live foal. One of the mares bred to him was Zenyatta, the 2010 Horse of the Year.

Medaglia d'Oro had seven GI winners in 2017: among American stallions, only Danzig, Mr. Prospector, and Storm Cat have ever had as many. With two winners at the 2017 Breeders' Cup, Darley raised his stud fee to $250,000.

=== Statistics ===
By Racing Year, for offspring racing in the Northern Hemisphere
| Year | North American Rank | Winners | Stakes Winners | Graded Stakes Winners | Chief Earner | Earnings^{†} |
|---|---|---|---|---|---|---|
| 2008 | #4 first-crop | 18 | 4 | 2 | Retraceable | $1,335,405 |
| 2009 | #1 second-crop | 67 | 10 | 5 | Rachel Alexandra | $7,737,666 |
| 2010 | 17 | 82 | 14 | 6 | Rachel Alexandra | $6,247,361 |
| 2011 | 9 | 98 | 12 | 7 | Plum Pretty | $6,882,615 |
| 2012 | 20 | 103 | 11 | 6 | Marketing Mix | $9,305,068 |
| 2013 | 12 | 112 | 18 | 7 | Rydilluc | $7,783,016 |
| 2014 | 6 | 126 | 19 | 8 | Coffee Clique | $9,162,175 |
| 2015 | 2 | 129 | 22 | 12 | Songbird | $13,219,030 |
| 2016 | 7 | 98 | 15 | 6 | Songbird | $10,664,220 |

^{†} Prior to 2015, the Leading Sire Lists published by The Blood-Horse excluded earnings from Hong Kong and Japan due to the disparity in purses. Starting in 2015, earnings from Hong Kong and Japan are included on an adjusted basis.

=== Notable progeny ===
Medaglia d'Oro has currently sired 28 individual Group 1 winners:

c = colt, f = filly, g = gelding

| Foaled | Name | Sex | Major wins |
| 2006 | C. S. Silk | f | Just a Game Stakes |
| 2006 | Gabby's Golden Gal | f | Acorn Stakes, Santa Monica Handicap |
| 2006 | Rachel Alexandra | f | Kentucky Oaks, Preakness Stakes, Mother Goose Stakes, Haskell Invitational Stakes, Woodward Stakes |
| 2006 | Warrior's Reward | c | Carter Handicap |
| 2007 | Champagne d'Oro | f | Acorn Stakes, Test Stakes |
| 2007 | Passion For Gold | c | Critérium de Saint-Cloud |
| 2008 | Marketing Mix | f | Rodeo Drive Stakes, Gamely Stakes |
| 2008 | Plum Pretty | f | Kentucky Oaks, Apple Blossom Handicap |
| 2010 | Coffee Clique | f | Just a Game Stakes |
| 2010 | Lochte | g | Gulfstream Park Turf Handicap |
| 2010 | Mshawish | c | Gulfstream Park Turf Handicap, Donn Handicap |
| 2010 | Violence | c | Los Alamitos Futurity |
| 2012 | Bar Of Gold | f | Breeders Cup Filly and Mare Sprint |
| 2012 | Dickinson | f | Jenny Wiley Stakes |
| 2012 | Vancouver | c | Golden Slipper Stakes |
| 2013 | Astern | c | Golden Rose Stakes |
| 2013 | Songbird | f | Del Mar Debutante Stakes, Chandelier Stakes, Breeders' Cup Juvenile Fillies, Santa Anita Oaks, American Oaks, Alabama Stakes, Cotillion Stakes, Ogden Phipps Stakes, Delaware Handicap |
| 2013 | Talismanic | c | Breeders' Cup Turf |
| 2014 | Elate | f | Alabama Stakes, Beldame Stakes |
| 2014 | New Money Honey | f | Breeders' Cup Juvenile Fillies Turf, Belmont Oaks |
| 2015 | Bolt d'Oro | c | Del Mar Futurity, FrontRunner Stakes, Santa Anita Derby |
| 2015 | Crown Prosecutor | c | New Zealand Derby |
| 2015 | Golden Sixty | g | Hong Kong Mile (thrice), Hong Kong Stewards' Cup (twice), Hong Kong Gold Cup (twice), Champions Mile (thrice) |
| 2015 | Higher Power | c | Pacific Classic Stakes |
| 2016 | Cambier Parc | f | Del Mar Oaks, Queen Elizabeth II Challenge Cup Stakes |
| 2016 | Flit | f | The Thousand Guineas |
| 2019 | Spirit of St Louis | g | Turf Classic Stakes |
| 2022 | East Avenue | c | Breeders' Futurity Stakes |
| 2022 | Good Cheer | f | Kentucky Oaks |
| 2022 | Nitrogen | f | Alabama Stakes, Ogden Phipps Stakes, Breeders' Cup Distaff |
| 2023 | Tam Tam | f | Del Mar Oaks, Queen Elizabeth II Challenge Cup Stakes |

== Death ==
Medaglia d'Oro was pensioned from stud duties at the end of the 2025 breeding season. On October 16, 2026, Darley America announced that Medaglia D'Oro had died earlier that day at Jonabell Farm at the age of 27.

== Pedigree ==
Pedigree of Medaglia d'Oro, dark bay or brown stallion, 1999
| Sire El Prado | Sadler's Wells | Northern Dancer | Nearctic |
| Sire El Prado | Sadler's Wells | Northern Dancer | Natalma |
| Sire El Prado | Sadler's Wells | Fairy Bridge | Bold Reason |
| Sire El Prado | Sadler's Wells | Fairy Bridge | Special |
| Sire El Prado | Lady Capulet | Sir Ivor | Sir Gaylord |
| Sire El Prado | Lady Capulet | Sir Ivor | Attica |
| Sire El Prado | Lady Capulet | Caps and Bells | Tom Fool |
| Sire El Prado | Lady Capulet | Caps and Bells | Ghazni |
| Dam Cappucino Bay | Bailjumper | Damascus | Sword Dancer |
| Dam Cappucino Bay | Bailjumper | Damascus | Kerala |
| Dam Cappucino Bay | Bailjumper | Court Circuit | Royal Vale |
| Dam Cappucino Bay | Bailjumper | Court Circuit | Cycle |
| Dam Cappucino Bay | Dubbed In | Silent Screen | Prince John |
| Dam Cappucino Bay | Dubbed In | Silent Screen | Prayer Bell |
| Dam Cappucino Bay | Dubbed In | Society Singer | Restless Wind |
| Dam Cappucino Bay | Dubbed In | Society Singer | Social Position (Family 9-b) |

== Sources ==
- http://www.bloodhorse.com/stallion-register/stallions/132019/medaglia-doro
