= Songbird (horse) =

American-bred Thoroughbred racehorse

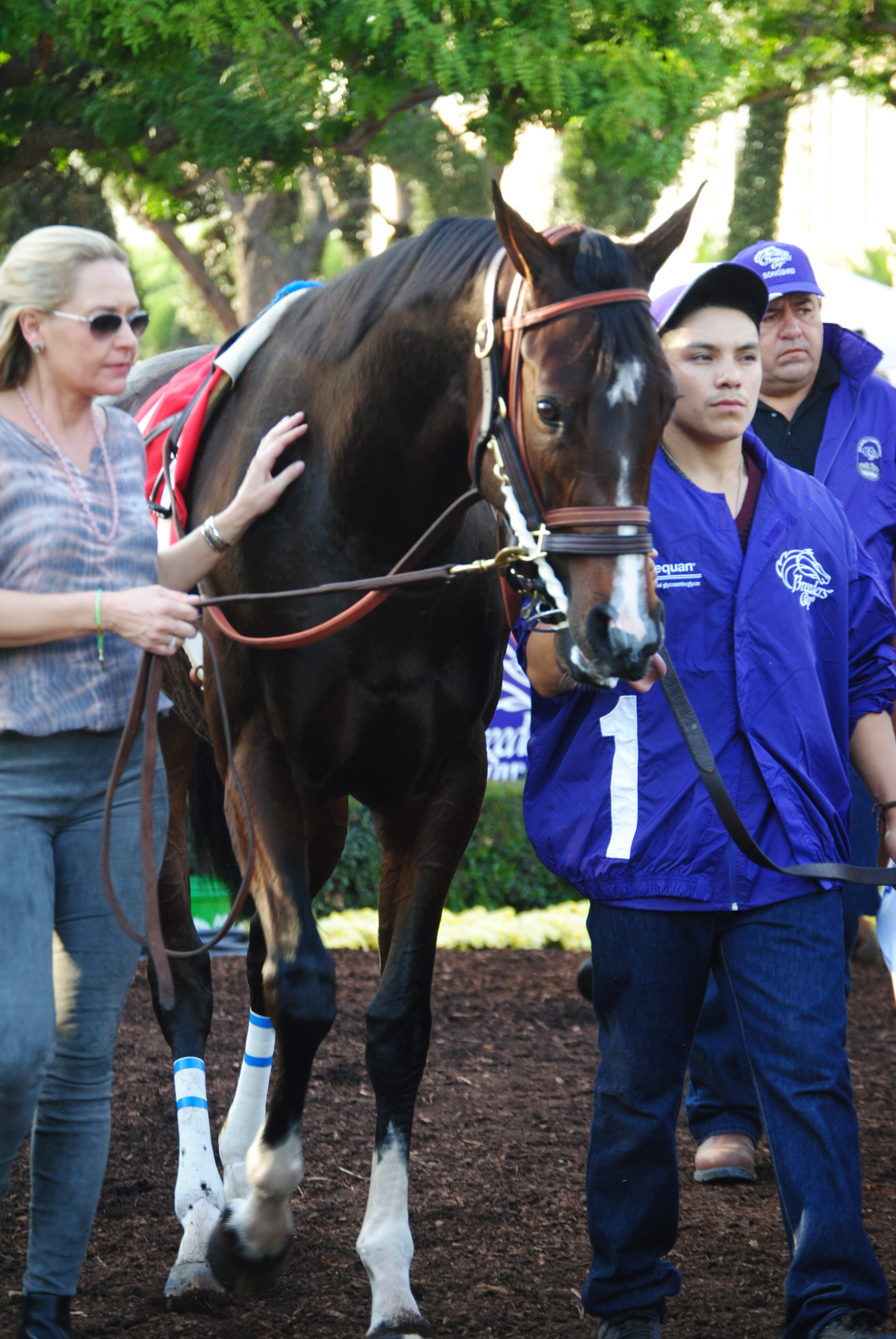
- Songbird at the 2016 Breeders' Cup Distaff
- Sire: Medaglia d'Oro
- Grandsire: El Prado
- Dam: Ivanavinalot
- Damsire: West Acre
- Sex: Mare
- Foaled: April 30, 2013
- Country: United States
- Colour: Bay
- Breeder: John Antonelli
- Owner: Fox Hill Farms Inc
- Trainer: Jerry Hollendorfer
- Record: 15: 13-2-0
- Earnings: $4,692,000

Major wins
- Del Mar Debutante Stakes (2015); Chandelier Stakes (2015); Breeders' Cup Juvenile Fillies (2015); Las Virgenes Stakes (2016); Santa Ysabel Stakes (2016); Santa Anita Oaks (2016); Summertime Oaks (2016); Coaching Club American Oaks (2016); Alabama Stakes (2016); Cotillion Stakes (2016); Ogden Phipps Stakes (2017); Delaware Handicap (2017)

Awards
- American Champion Two-Year-Old Filly (2015) American Champion Three-Year-Old Filly (2016)

Honors
- National Museum of Racing and Hall of Fame (2023)
- Last updated on 26 April 2023

Songbird (foaled April 30, 2013) is a retired US Hall of Fame Thoroughbred racehorse who was a two-time Eclipse Award winner. She won thirteen times, nine of them in Grade I races, and had career earnings of almost $4.7 million.

She was the 2015 American Champion Two-Year-Old Filly after being undefeated in four starts, including Grade I victories in the Del Mar Debutante Stakes, Chandelier Stakes and Breeders' Cup Juvenile Fillies. She was undefeated against three-year-old fillies in 2016 including the Grade I Santa Anita Oaks, Coaching Club American Oaks, Alabama and Cotillion Stakes. Her 11-race undefeated streak ended in the Breeders' Cup Distaff, where she was second by a scant nose to the 6-year-old champion mare, Beholder. Despite the loss, she was a unanimous selection as the American Champion Three-Year-Old Filly of 2016. In 2017 after her return to the racetrack was delayed by injury, she won the Grade I Ogden Phipps after a seven-month layoff and then won the Delaware Handicap in July for her ninth Grade I victory. In August, she finished second, beaten by just a neck, in the Personal Ensign Stakes in what became her final start. After the race, an exam uncovered some hidden injuries to her front and hind legs, causing her to be retired. She was sold as a broodmare at the November Fasig-Tipton sale for a near-record price of $9.5 million.

== Background ==
Songbird is a large bay filly bred in Kentucky by John Antonelli. She was sired by Medaglia d'Oro, whose wins included the Travers Stakes, Whitney Handicap, and Donn Handicap. As a breeding stallion, Medaglia d'Oro is best known as the sire of Rachel Alexandra. Songbird's dam Ivanavinalot was a successful racemare whose six wins included the Grade II Bonnie Miss Stakes at Gulfstream Park in March 2003. Ivanavinalot was descended from Flower Bed, the dam of the leading racehorse and broodmare Flower Bowl. Owner Rick Porter named the filly in honor of the late singer Eva Cassidy.

In August 2014 the yearling filly was consigned to the Fasig-Tipton sale at Saratoga and was bought for $400,000 by Rick Porter's Fox Hill Farms. She was sent into training with the veteran Jerry Hollendorfer and was ridden throughout her career by jockey Mike Smith, who also rode the mare Zenyatta.

== Racing career ==
=== 2015: two-year-old season ===
Songbird began her racing career in a maiden race over six furlongs at Del Mar Racetrack on July 27. She took an early lead and drew away in the last quarter mile to win by six and a half lengths in front of the favored Tiz A Tommy Town. On September 5 at the same track the filly was moved up sharply in class to contest the Grade I Del Mar Debutante Stakes and started the 11/10 favorite in a ten-runner field. Her main rival in the betting was the Bob Baffert-trained Pretty N Cool who had won the Grade II Sorrento Stakes on her previous start. Songbird took an early lead but was headed by Pretty N Cool after three furlongs. She soon regained the advantage and went clear in the straight to win by five and a quarter lengths with Pretty N Cool holding on for second ahead of Land Over Sea. Mike Smith commented "For such a big mare, things just come so easy for her. I've been getting on her in the mornings and I'm impressed by just how well she does things. She came right out of that gate today—so smooth."

Three weeks after her win in the Debutante, Songbird went for another Grade I prize when she started odds-on favorite for the Chandelier Stakes over 8 1/2 furlongs at Santa Anita Park. Baffert's Jade Princess was the second choice while Land Over Sea appeared the best of the other six entrants. Smith sent Songbird into the lead from the start and the favorite never looked in any danger of defeat, coming home 4 1/2 lengths clear of Land Over Sea. After the race Smith praised the winner's attitude and temperament saying "Not only does she have the ability but she has the mind to go with it... She's so intelligent, she's so smart and listens to everything I tell her".

Songbird ventured out of California for the first time when she was made 3/5 favorite for the Breeders' Cup Juvenile Fillies at Keeneland on October 31. Her most serious opponents appeared to be Rachel's Valentina (winner of the Spinaway Stakes and the second foal of Rachel Alexandra), Tap To It (runner-up in the Spinaway), Land Over Sea and Nickname (Frizette Stakes), with the other five fillies starting at 26/1 or longer. Drawn on the extreme outside of the field, Songbird broke quickly and went straight into the lead. Rachel's Valentina raced in second without ever threatening the favorite and Songbird extended her advantage in the straight to win by five and three-quarter lengths. The Ken McPeek-trained longshot Dothraki Queen stayed on to take third ahead of Nickname. Smith, who was winning a record 22nd Breeders' Cup race, said "Once we jumped out the gate, it was just a matter of me staying on... I almost felt like yawning as we went along. I don't mean that in a bragging way. She just gives me that much confidence."

At the Eclipse Award ceremony on January 16, 2016, Songbird was awarded the title of American Champion Two-Year-Old Filly having received 260 of the 261 votes. In the Experimental Free Handicap (a ranking of the best American two-year-olds), published at the end of January, Songbird was assigned 125 pounds, one pound behind the colt Nyquist and five pounds clear of the next best fillies Catch A Glimpse (Breeders' Cup Juvenile Fillies Turf) and Rachel's Valentina. Her rating was the highest given to a juvenile filly in eighteen years.

=== 2016: three-year-old season ===
Songbird began her 2016 in the Grade II Las Virgenes Stakes over one mile at Santa Anita on February 6. Starting at odds of 1/20, she took the lead as usual, went ten lengths clear on the final turn and won easing down by six lengths from Land Over Sea. After the race Rick Porter played down the speculation that the filly might run in the Kentucky Derby, saying that a run in the Kentucky Oaks would be the "smart move". He also pointed out that the Songbird would have to run against colts in the Santa Anita Derby in order to accrue the points needed to qualify for the Derby field. A month later the filly was stepped up slightly in trip for the Grade III Santa Ysabel Stakes over 8 1/2 furlongs at the same track. She was challenged in the early stages by Jade Princess and Not Now Carolyn but drew away from her rivals on the backstretch and was six lengths clear entering the straight. As in her previous start she was eased by Smith in the closing stages and won by 3 3/4 lengths at odds of 1/9. On April 9 the filly started at long odds-on for the Santa Anita Oaks and recorded another easy victory, coping easily with the sloppy track and coming home 3 3/4 lengths clear of Mokat.

On April 17, it was announced that the filly was suffering from a fever and would miss the Kentucky Oaks. Hollendorfer explained "She showed up with a temperature one morning and we got on it right away. It never got to be a high temperature and we think she's going to be fine, but we don't want her to train right now, so that's why we'll miss the Oaks."

On June 18, Songbird returned to the track in the Summertime Oaks at Santa Anita as the 1-20 favorite. For the first time, she tracked the early pace set by Bellamentary, then moved alongside down the backstretch and gradually pulled away, winning by 6 1/2 lengths. “It scares me to think of how good she is," said Smith. "I try not to think of it."

On July 24, Songbird travelled to Saratoga in upstate New York for the Coaching Club American Oaks, which because of her presence had the purse boosted from $300,000 to $500,000. She faced a small but strong field, featuring Carina Mia, winner of the Acorn Stakes, and Weep No More, winner of the Ashland Stakes. Songbird went to the early lead, with Carina Mia pressing the pace from the outside. On the far turn, Carina Mia made a run at Songbird and closed to within a neck before Songbird again pulled away, eventually winning by over five lengths. "I asked her more than I've ever had to," said Smith, who whipped Songbird three times early in the stretch. "I take my hat off to Carina Mia. She made her run a little bit."

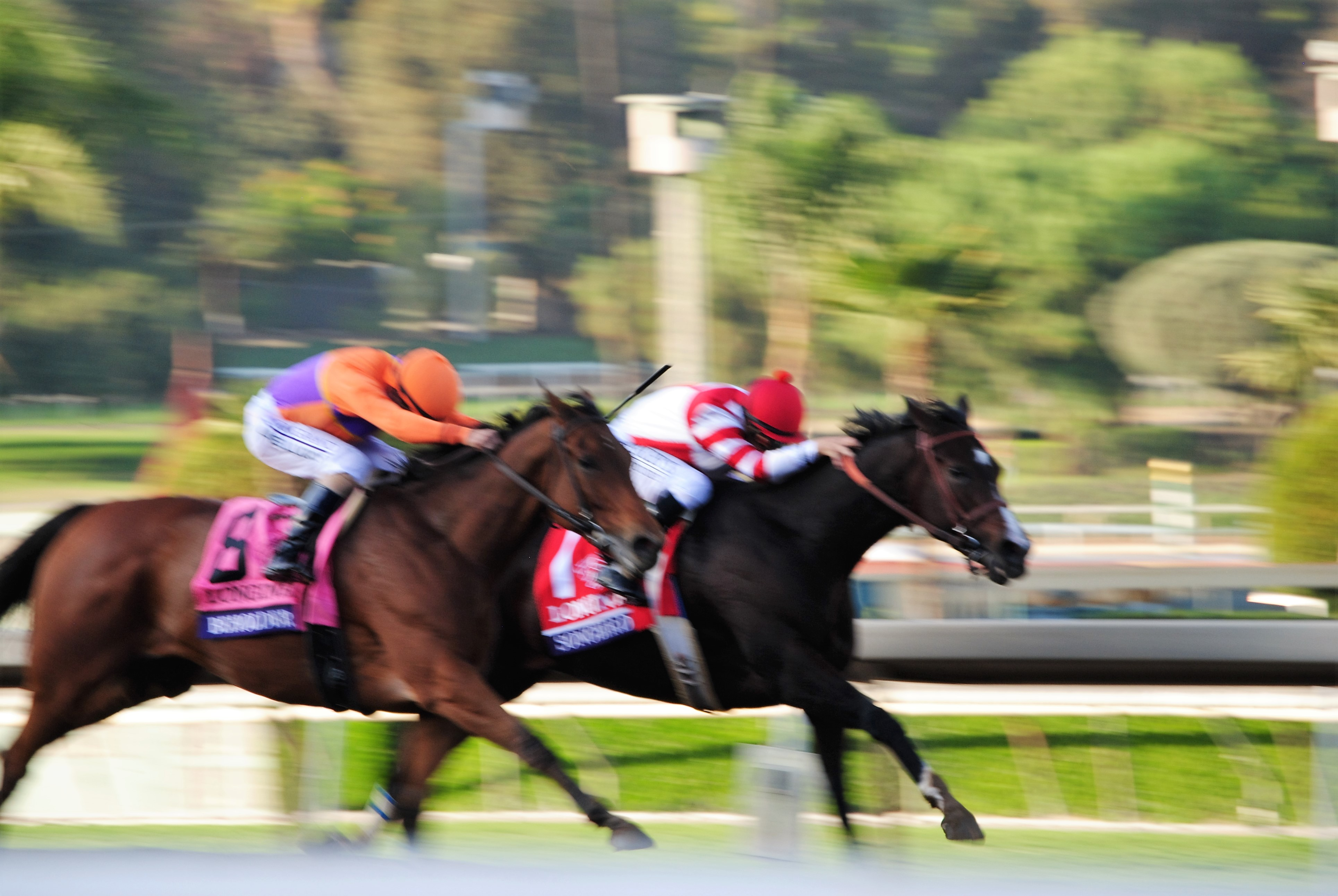
Beholder and Songbird in the stretch run of the Distaff

On August 20, Songbird entered the 1 1/4-mile Alabama Stakes, where she was challenged for the early lead by Go Maggie Go. The two fillies raced side by side for the first six furlongs, then Songbird pulled ahead on the far turn and won by a comfortable seven lengths. She returned to California then shipped to Parx Racing in Pennsylvania in contest the $1 million Cotillion Stakes on September 24. As the 1-5 favorite, Songbird rated behind Carina Mia for the first 3/4 then moved to the lead at the head of the stretch, winning by 5 3/4 lengths. "She was so happy—so calm and cool. She drew away ... She was having fun today", said Smith. "She does things so easily and I'm so blessed to be a part of her."

On November 4, Songbird was the odds-on favorite in the Breeders' Cup Distaff at Santa Anita. In her first race against older horses, she faced a strong field that included Stellar Wind, the previous year's American Champion three-year-old filly, and the three-time American champion filly or mare and 2013 Distaff winner, Beholder. From the inside post position of the eight-horse field, Songbird took an early lead tracked until challenged by Beholder on the final turn. The pair engaged in a prolonged struggle in the straight before Beholder prevailed by a scant nose in a photo-finish. Stevens described the race by saying, "I've been in battles before, but never the length of the stretch . . . definitely a quarter of a mile of just a street fight." Of the near-dead heat between the two horses, decided by an inch, Smith stated, "It's just too bad someone had to lose," adding, "my filly ran incredible. I'm so proud of her."

Songbird was the unanimous winner of the Eclipse Award for American Champion Three-Year-Old Filly. She was also nominated for Horse of the Year, along with California Chrome and Arrogate.

=== 2017: Four-year-old season ===
Songbird was originally scheduled to return to racing in March 2017 in the Santa Margarita Stakes. However, early in the year she kicked the wall of her stall and experienced some swelling in her leg. She finally returned on June 10 at Belmont Park in the Ogden Phipps Stakes, in which she was the odds-on favorite despite the seven-month layoff. She broke well and went to the early lead but was challenged around the turn by Paid-Up Subscriber, who briefly got a head in front rounding into the homestretch. Songbird rallied and drew off again to win by a length. Hollendorfer said, "I'm not sure she's at the top of her game right now, but she did very well today."

On July 15, Songbird was entered in the Delaware Handicap, in which she was the overwhelming favorite at odds of 1-20. She was assigned topweight of 124 pounds (56 kg), conceding at least eight pounds to her rivals. She broke well and moved to the early lead, setting moderate fractions. Around the far turn, she was challenged by Martini Glass, who closed to within half a length. Under heavy urging, Songbird held off the challenge and won by a length. "I think the mile and a quarter might not be her best distance," said Smith, "I was more worried about getting beat in this race than in most of them."

Songbird returned on August 26 in the Personal Ensign Stakes at Saratoga, where she faced only three rivals. She broke well and set an easy pace while opening a comfortable 3 1/2 length lead. Turning into the stretch though, Forever Unbridled made a strong move in the center of the track and pulled ahead of Songbird in the final strides. Smith felt that the tactics of Forever Unbridled's jockey in racing wide were decisive. "I wish they would've come right next to me because I think she would've picked it up and maybe held them off. When I asked her heading for home she accelerated, (but) she's not supposed to get run down, and he ran me down."

== Retirement ==
After the Personal Ensign, Porter said that he feared Songbird was not completely healthy, so arranged for her to be assessed at Rood & Riddle Equine Hospital. On August 31, he announced that she had damaged her hind suspensory ligaments, plus a lesion was found on a front distal cannon bone that could have proved catastrophic if she raced again. Dr. Larry Bramlage explained that the injuries probably occurred earlier in the year and were an example of how lameness in a horse can hide. "Horses that don't have any obvious problems but you know their performance is declining, usually you find more than one problem going on," he said.

Porter announced that Songbird was being retired and would be offered for sale at the Fasig-Tipton November mixed sale as a broodmare prospect. Mike Smith said: "She was everything you'd want in a racehorse, everything. The balance, the speed, the stamina, the class, the heart, the try: she was just everything."

Songbird was sold in November 2017 to Mandy Pope's Whisper Hill Farm for $9.5 million, a near-record price for a broodmare prospect (only Horse of the Year Havre de Grace, also sold by Porter to Pope, had ever sold for more).

She was bred to Arrogate in 2018. On January 28, she had her first foal, a filly by Arrogate. In 2019 she was bred to leading sire Tapit.

In 2023 Songbird was inducted into the National Museum of Racing and Hall of Fame along with the first horse she was bred to, the late Arrogate.

== Race record ==
Updated August 31, 2017
Date	Track	Race	Distance	Finish	Margin	Time
Jul 26, 2015	Del Mar	Maiden	6 furlongs	1	6 1/2 lengths	1:11.03
Sep 5, 2015	Del Mar	Del Mar Debutante Stakes	7 furlongs	1	5 1/4 lengths	1:22.65
Sep 26, 2015	Santa Anita Park	Chandelier Stakes	1 1/16 miles	1	4 1/2 lengths	1:43.79
Oct 31, 2015	Keeneland	Breeders' Cup Juvenile Fillies	1 1/16 miles	1	5 3/4 lengths	1:42.73
Feb 6, 2016	Santa Anita Park	Las Virgenes Stakes	1 mile	1	6 1/2 lengths	1:36.84
Mar 5, 2016	Santa Anita Park	Santa Ysabel Stakes	1 1/16 miles	1	3 3/4 lengths	1:43.02
Apr 9, 2016	Santa Anita Park	Santa Anita Oaks	1 1/16 miles	1	3 3/4 lengths	1:44.14
Jun 18, 2016	Santa Anita Park	Summertime Oaks	1 1/16 miles	1	6 1/2 lengths	1:42.63
Jul 24, 2016	Saratoga	Coaching Club American Oaks	1 1/8 miles	1	5 1/4 lengths	1:49.56
Aug 20, 2016	Saratoga	Alabama Stakes	1 1/4 miles	1	7 lengths	2:03.00
Sep 24, 2016	Parx Racing	Cotillion Stakes	1 1/16 miles	1	5 3/4 lengths	1:44.02
Nov 4, 2016	Santa Anita	Breeders' Cup Distaff	1 1/8 miles	2	(nose)	1:49.20
Jun 10, 2017	Belmont Park	Ogden Phipps Stakes	1 1/16 miles	1	1 length	1:42.24
Jul 15, 2017	Delaware Park	Delaware Handicap	1 1/4 miles	1	1 length	2:03.96
Aug 26, 2017	Saratoga	Personal Ensign Stakes	1 1/8 miles	2	(neck)	1:49.16

== Pedigree ==
Pedigree of Songbird (USA), bay filly, 2013
Sire Medaglia d'Oro (USA) 1999	El Prado (IRE); 1989	Sadler's Wells	Northern Dancer
Sire Medaglia d'Oro (USA) 1999	El Prado (IRE); 1989	Sadler's Wells	Fairy Bridge
Sire Medaglia d'Oro (USA) 1999	El Prado (IRE); 1989	Lady Capulet	Sir Ivor
Sire Medaglia d'Oro (USA) 1999	El Prado (IRE); 1989	Lady Capulet	Cap and Bells
Sire Medaglia d'Oro (USA) 1999	Cappucino Bay (USA); 1989	Bailjumper	Damascus
Sire Medaglia d'Oro (USA) 1999	Cappucino Bay (USA); 1989	Bailjumper	Court Circuit
Sire Medaglia d'Oro (USA) 1999	Cappucino Bay (USA); 1989	Dubbed In	Silent Screen
Sire Medaglia d'Oro (USA) 1999	Cappucino Bay (USA); 1989	Dubbed In	Society Singer
Dam Ivanavinalot (USA) 2000	West Acre (USA); 1995	Forty Niner	Mr Prospector
Dam Ivanavinalot (USA) 2000	West Acre (USA); 1995	Forty Niner	File
Dam Ivanavinalot (USA) 2000	West Acre (USA); 1995	Narrate	Honest Pleasure
Dam Ivanavinalot (USA) 2000	West Acre (USA); 1995	Narrate	State
Dam Ivanavinalot (USA) 2000	Beaty Sark (USA); 1986	Deputy Minister	Vice Regent
Dam Ivanavinalot (USA) 2000	Beaty Sark (USA); 1986	Deputy Minister	Mint Copy
Dam Ivanavinalot (USA) 2000	Beaty Sark (USA); 1986	Torsion Belle	Torsion
Dam Ivanavinalot (USA) 2000	Beaty Sark (USA); 1986	Torsion Belle	Patriotic Petunia (Family: 4-d)
