= Rachel Alexandra =

American-bred Thoroughbred racehorse

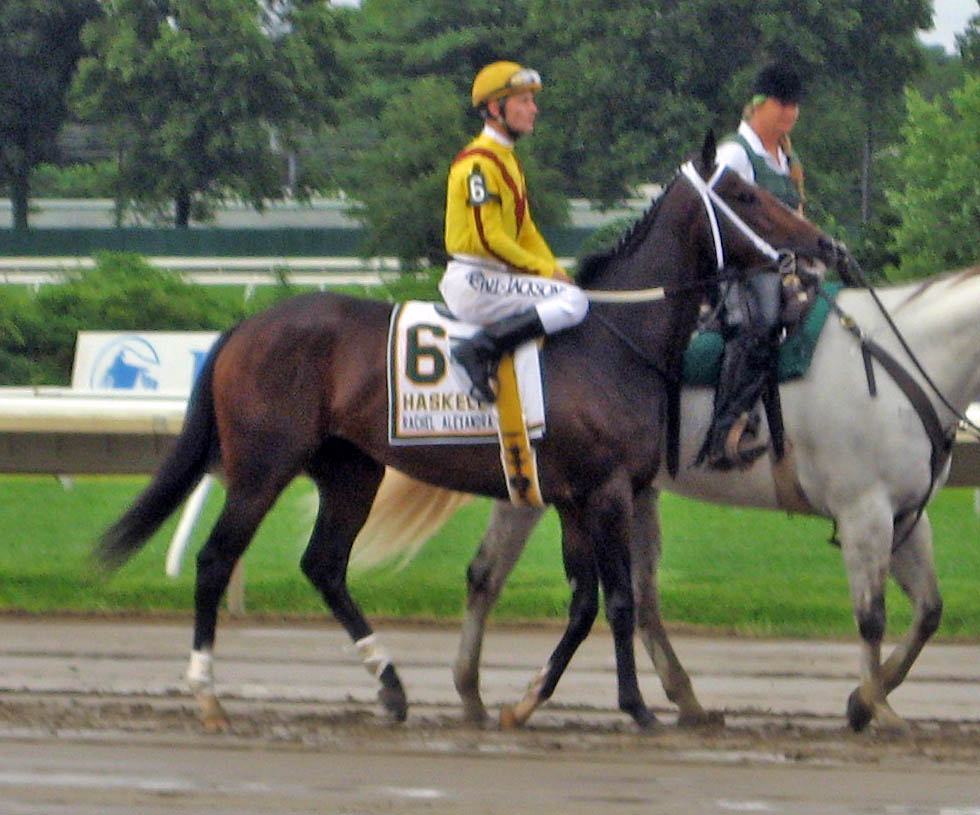
- Rachel Alexandra at the Haskell Invitational in 2009
- Sire: Medaglia d'Oro
- Grandsire: El Prado
- Dam: Lotta Kim
- Damsire: Roar
- Sex: Mare
- Foaled: January 29, 2006 (age 20); Lexington, Kentucky, U.S.
- Country: United States
- Color: Dark Bay
- Breeder: Dolphus C. Morrison
- Owner: Dolphus C. Morrison; Stonestreet Stables
- Trainer: Hal Wiggins; Steve Asmussen
- Record: 19: 13-5-0
- Earnings: US$3,506,730

Major wins
- Golden Rod Stakes (2008); Martha Washington Stakes (2009); Fair Grounds Oaks (2009); Fantasy Stakes (2009); Kentucky Oaks (2009); Mother Goose Stakes (2009); Haskell Invitational Handicap (2009); Woodward Stakes (2009); Fleur de Lis Handicap (2010) Triple Crown classic race wins: Preakness Stakes (2009)

Awards
- American Champion Three-Year-Old Filly (2009); American Horse of the Year (2009)

Honors
- Rachel Alexandra Stakes (renamed in 2010); Fair Grounds Racing Hall of Fame (2011); National Museum of Racing and Hall of Fame (2016)

Rachel Alexandra (foaled January 29, 2006) is a retired American Thoroughbred racehorse and the 2009 Horse of the Year. When she won the 2009 Preakness Stakes, the second leg of the Triple Crown, she became the first filly to win the race in 85 years (the last filly to win was Nellie Morse, in 1924). She also won races in six states (Kentucky, Louisiana, Arkansas, Maryland, New York, and New Jersey), on eight different tracks, against fillies and Grade 1 colts and older horses, achieving a long string of consecutive wins including numerous Grade 1 stakes. Rachel Alexandra neared or broke multiple stakes records, track records and winning margin records throughout her career.

Rachel Alexandra is a dark bay mare with a distinctive upside-down exclamation-point-shaped white blaze. She stands an estimated 16 hands at the withers. Her preferred style of running is generally that of a front runner (running on the lead) or a stalker (running close to and just behind the lead), though she occasionally competed from off of the pace (Mother Goose Stakes).

Rachel Alexandra was bred and originally owned by Dolphus Morrison, who named her after his granddaughter. Before she became successful as a racehorse, Morrison sold part interest in her to Michael Lauffer. Her initial trainer was Hal Wiggins, Morrison's regular trainer, who trained her until the Kentucky Oaks 2009. After her Kentucky Oaks victory, Rachel Alexandra was sold for an undisclosed amount (rumored to be in excess of $10 million) to Stonestreet Stables and Harold T. McCormick, with billionaire Jess Jackson of Kendall Jackson Winery holding controlling interest. Her training was taken over by Steve Asmussen, and her regular jockey was Calvin Borel.

== Breeding ==
=== Sire ===
Medaglia d'Oro (foaled 1999, Kentucky) was a successful multiple Grade 1 Stakes winner and earned $5,754,720 in his racing career. His notable performances included wins in the 2002 Travers Stakes, 2003 Whitney Handicap, and 2004 Donn Handicap, as well as second-place finishes in the 2002 Belmont Stakes, Breeders' Cup Classic (twice, in 2002 and 2003), and 2004 Dubai World Cup. Medaglia d'Oro was a frontrunner known for his consistency and tenacity. He was retired from racing in 2004 and entered stud. Rachel Alexandra is a member of Medaglia d'Oro's extremely successful first crop to race, which also includes major stakes winners Gabby's Golden Gal (Acorn Stakes) and Payton d'Oro (Black-Eyed Susan Stakes). In 2009, Medaglia d'Oro was the leading second-crop sire in North America, with over $7.7 million in 2009 progeny earnings.

=== Dam ===
Morrison bred and raced Rachel Alexandra's dam, Lotta Kim (foaled 2001, Kentucky), a moderately successful racehorse whose biggest win came in the Tiffany Lass Stakes at Fair Grounds Race Course. Soon after that race, she was injured in a training accident and retired. Rachel Alexandra was Lotta Kim's first and only surviving foal until 2011; Lotta Kim's 2007 colt by Empire Maker succumbed to a neurological disorder known as Wobbler disease, while her 2008 foal was born prematurely and died. Morrison did not breed Lotta Kim in 2009, but returned her to Medaglia d'Oro in 2010, having declined numerous offers to sell the mare in the wake of Rachel Alexandra's success. Lotta Kim produced a bay filly by Medaglia d'Oro on February 27, 2011, at Heaven Trees Farm near Lexington, Kentucky. The foal, named Samantha Nicole, sported a star and broken stripe very similar to that of her full sister, Rachel Alexandra. As a yearling, Samantha Nicole was purchased at the 2012 Keeneland November breeding stock sale for $700,000 by Stonestreet Stable, which had also purchased Rachel Alexandra after her win in the 2009 Kentucky Oaks. Lotta Kim produced a chestnut colt named Dolphus in 2013, sired by 2010 Preakness Stakes winner Lookin At Lucky.

Rachel Alexandra had a different personality than her dam. "Lotta Kim had a terrible disposition," Wiggins recalled. "She wasn't really mean, but plumb ornery. She made it a project every time you wanted to do something with her. Completely the opposite from Rachel Alexandra. I don't know what you could do to get Rachel Alexandra excited, except go into the starting gate."

Through Lotta Kim, Rachel Alexandra is a fourth-generation descendant of Mr. Prospector. Northern Dancer is in both sides of her pedigree.

=== Breeding and early training ===
Morrison stated that he bred Lotta Kim to Medaglia d'Oro because he was impressed with the stallion's physical presence and compatibility with the mare:

"I bred Lotta Kim as a good physical fit for Medaglia d'Oro. He was, in my opinion at that time, the best thing I'd ever seen. He was an awesome thing, physically. Great balance, great racehorse, and obviously with the way he could finish a race, he had a great airway. That's one thing I've always looked for in broodmares, horses that can finish two turns effectively. Some sprinters are okay, but I prefer the good airway. That's what makes a good racehorse, along with the rest of the physical machine."

Rachel Alexandra was foaled on January 29, 2006, at Dr. Dede McGehee's Heaven Trees Farm near Lexington, Kentucky. Lotta Kim rejected her after she was foaled, so she was raised by a nurse mare. According to Morrison, Rachel Alexandra looked "a little raw-boned and a little scruffy" as a foal. Morrison rarely sells the first couple of foals out of his mares, but he almost made an exception with Rachel Alexandra, entering her in the 2006 Keeneland November Sale as a weanling. When X-rays revealed a "minor development problem", he scratched her, convinced she wouldn't bring the $125,000 he thought she was worth.

In August 2007, Morrison sent Rachel Alexandra to Diamond D Ranch in Lone Oak, Texas, where Jimmy (Scooter) Dodwell broke her in. In November of that year, Morrison asked if Rachel was ready to be entered in a Florida sale. "She had a ton of speed, with a long stride, and [I thought] she might be able to run forever," recalls Dodwell. "I stuck my neck out and told Mr. Morrison, 'You might want to hang onto this one.'"

== Racing career ==
=== Jockey ===
Rachel Alexandra's original jockey was Brian Hernandez Jr., who rode her to two wins in five starts. However, Wiggins had used Calvin Borel to work Rachel and considered a change. Borel first rode Rachel Alexandra in the Grade II Golden Rod Stakes to a 4 3/4 length victory, setting a stakes record for time. Rachel Alexandra began a 9-race winning streak with Calvin Borel aboard. Borel said he learned not to hold back Rachel Alexandra, even if she wanted to run the first quarter-mile in a fast 22 seconds or the half-mile in 44. "I don't fight her ever since I've been on her," he said. "The first day I learned that."

=== 2009 racing campaign highlights ===
Following dominating wins in the Martha Washington Stakes and Fair Grounds Oaks, Rachel Alexandra stepped into the Oaklawn Park starting gate as the 1–10 favorite in the Fantasy Stakes and led wire-to-wire in the 1 1/16 mile race. Winning by 8 3/4 lengths, she finished with a final time of 1:43.35. A minus win pool of $3,382 and minus place pool of $227,722 resulted, with no show wagering offered for the 5 horse field.

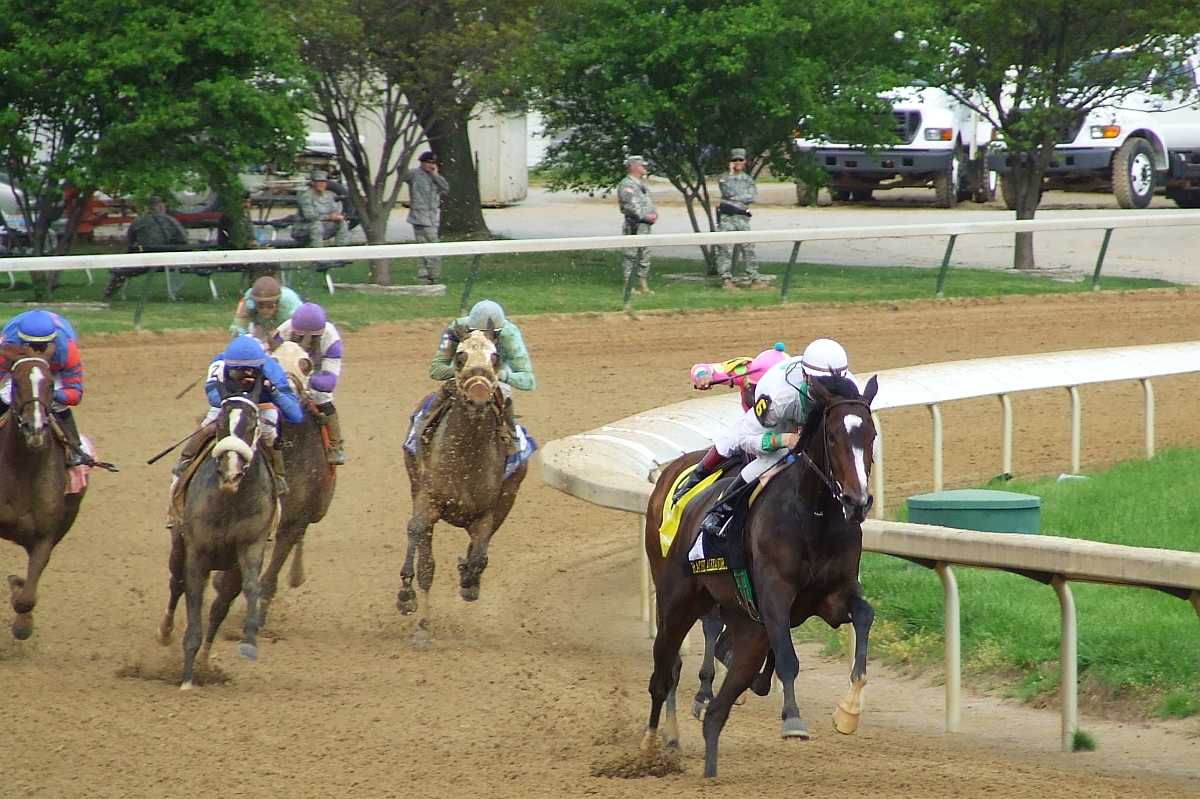
Rachel Alexandra winning the Kentucky Oaks.

In the $500,000 Grade 1 Kentucky Oaks at Churchill Downs, Rachel Alexandra was sent off as the 3–10 favorite, coming to Louisville off four straight wins, all in stakes company, including an 8 3/4 length romp in the Fantasy Stakes at Oaklawn Park in her most recent start. Gabby's Golden Gal broke the quickest and was sent to the lead immediately by jockey Victor Espinoza as she set a pace of 23.75, 47.46, and 1:11.81 over the fast main track. Rachel Alexandra sat 1 1/2 lengths off the pace in second, just to her outside. Turning for home, Calvin Borel nudged Rachel Alexandra and she eased past the pacesetter to take the lead at the 1/4 pole. Once in front of the tiring Gabby's Golden Gal, Rachel Alexandra sprinted away from the field to win by more than 20 1/4 lengths in a time of 1:48.87, just 0.33 seconds off Bird Town's stakes record. Rachel Alexandra finished her last 1/8th of a mile in 12.00 seconds. Shortly after her 20 1/4 length win, by far the largest in the race's history, it was announced that Rachel Alexandra was sold to Jess Jackson's Stonestreet Stables and Harold T. McCormick. ESPN reported that she would be transferred to trainer Steve Asmussen. Before this, she was not expected to run against colts, but with her change of ownership came a change of plans. Jess Jackson, owner of Curlin, paid the US$100,000 supplemental fee that allowed her to race in the Preakness Stakes. Rachel Alexandra was the first filly to win the Preakness Stakes in 85 years, since 1924. Kentucky Derby winner Mine That Bird made a late charge and placed 2nd. Rachel Alexandra also was the first horse to win from the 13th post position and was the first Kentucky Oaks winner to also win the Preakness.

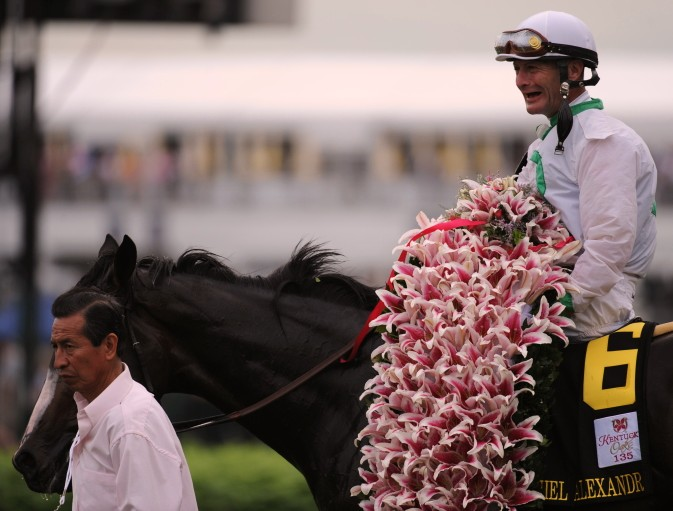
Rachel Alexandra in the Kentucky Oaks winner's circle.

On June 27, 2009, Rachel Alexandra ran in the $300,000 Grade 1 Mother Goose Stakes at Belmont Park, with Calvin Borel as jockey. She was sent off the 1–20 favorite and won by 19 1/4 lengths, breaking the stakes record with a time of 1:46:33 as well as the record margin of victory of 13 1/2 lengths set by Ruffian in 1975. Despite being eased in the stretch, she ran less than a second slower than Secretariat's 1973 track record of 1:45 2/5 in the inaugural Marlboro Cup Sept. 15, 1973. A minus win pool of $18,698 resulted, with no place or show wagering offered.

On August 2, 2009, Rachel Alexandra ran in the $1.25 million Grade 1 Haskell Invitational at Monmouth Park at 1 1/8 miles before 37,090 people. Toting 117 lbs, she won by 6 lengths in a time of 1:47.21 on a listed sloppy track. This time was 0.21 seconds off the stakes record and 0.41 seconds off the track record. She was assigned a Beyer Speed Figure rating of 116. This was the highest Beyer Speed Figure of any horse in North America in 2009. In the 42 runnings of the Haskell, fillies have won just twice: Serena's Song in 1995 and Rachel Alexandra.

On September 5, 2009, Rachel Alexandra ran in the $750,000 Grade 1 Woodward Stakes against older male horses at Saratoga Race Course. Following a blistering 22.85 opening quarter, she held off the late-closing Macho Again and won in a time of 1:48.29. Only six other fillies have ever started in this race, and only three finished in the money: Summer Guest finished third in 1972, and Lady's Secret finished 2nd in 1986. Rachel Alexandra was the first filly or mare ever to win the Woodward Stakes. She also was the first 3-year-old filly to win a grade I route dirt race against older males in New York since Lady Primrose won the Manhattan in 1887. Havre de Grace would be the second filly to ever win the Woodward in 2011 This increased Rachel Alexandra's 2009 winning streak to 9 consecutive victories.

=== 2010 racing campaign highlights ===
On March 13, 2010, following a 6-month break from competition, Rachel Alexandra was entered in her first race as a 4-year-old: the inaugural running of the 1 1/16 mile $200,000 New Orleans Ladies Stakes at Fair Grounds Race Course. Sent off as 1–20 favorite for the second time in her career, she finished second by three-quarters of a length to the six-year-old mare Zardana, who achieved a career-best speed figure of 101 in the race. Rachel toted top weight of 123 pounds, with Zardana at 121 pounds and the rest of the field at 117 pounds. It was 11 1/2 lengths back to third-place finisher Unforgotten, a 6-year-old daughter of Northern Afleet. In her place finish, Rachel was assigned a Beyer Speed Figure of 100. Following the second-place finish, owner Jess Jackson decided his filly would not compete in the Apple Blossom Invitational.

Making her second start of the season on April 30, 2010, Rachel Alexandra finished second by a head to the Rampart Stakes and 2010 Breeder's Cup Ladies Classic winner Unrivaled Belle in the Grade II La Troienne Stakes at Churchill Downs. Rachel carried the top weight of 124 pounds and gave 4 pounds or more to the rest of the field. The top two finishers both earned a Beyer Speed Figure of 103, which was a career high for Unrivaled Belle.

On June 12, 2010, as the 1–10 favorite in a five-horse field, Rachel Alexandra won the 1 1/8 mile $214,000 Grade 2 Fleur de Lis Handicap in its 36th running at Churchill Downs. Carrying the top weight of 124 pounds, giving 7–11 pounds to the rest of the field, she put away her rivals at the head of the stretch to win by 10 1/2 lengths. Her finishing time of 1:48.78 was a fraction faster than her Kentucky Oaks victory. She was assigned a Beyer Speed Figure of 109, the highest for any filly or mare thus far that year.

Rachel Alexandra's fourth start in 2010 was Monmouth Park's July 24 Lady's Secret Stakes at a mile and an eighth. The officials at Monmouth Park bumped the purse of the ungraded race from $150,000 to $400,000, contingent upon her starting in the race. The Monmouth race is not to be confused with the Oak Tree/Santa Anita race of the same name. Rachel Alexandra won the Lady's Secret by three lengths.

On 29 August 2010, Rachel Alexandra under Calvin Borel finished second by a length to Persistently at the 1 1/4 in the $300,000 Personal Ensign Stakes at Saratoga Race Course, a potential prep for the Breeders' Cup Classic. In that race, Rachel Alexandra and champion mare Life at Ten hooked up in a moderate pace. Rachel outlasted Life at Ten but could not hold off Persistently, who passed her 1/16th of a mile before the finish. Calvin Borel, rider aboard Rachel Alexandra, offered no excuses after the GI Personal Ensign, saying, "I had everything my way, and she just got outrun. After we put away Life At Ten at the quarter pole, I didn't feel any acceleration and I got worried. She wasn't really there. I knew if anyone was running behind us, we were in trouble."

== Breeding career ==
On September 28, 2010, Rachel Alexandra was retired from racing and became a broodmare for the 2011 breeding season.

=== Jess's Dream ===
Rachel Alexandra's first mating was with Curlin (2007 and 2008 American Horse of the Year) on 22 February – who also raced for owner Jess Stonestreet Jackson Jr. This cross put Rachel Alexandra on a short list of Thoroughbred broodmares who have won the Eclipse Award for Horse of the Year and produced foals by stallions who were also Horse of the Year, the others being Azeri (A.P. Indy and Ghostzapper), Lady's Secret (Seattle Slew and Skip Away), Moccasin (Round Table), Twilight Tear (Whirlaway), and Regret (Man o' War).

"The privilege of owning these horses is like lightning striking twice," said Barbara Banke, wife of Jess Jackson, in a statement. "Rachel Alexandra and Curlin are true champions; both horses embody that intangible equine ideal that separate mere horse from legend. Both Jess and I are so pleased that these powerful bloodlines will pass to future generations."

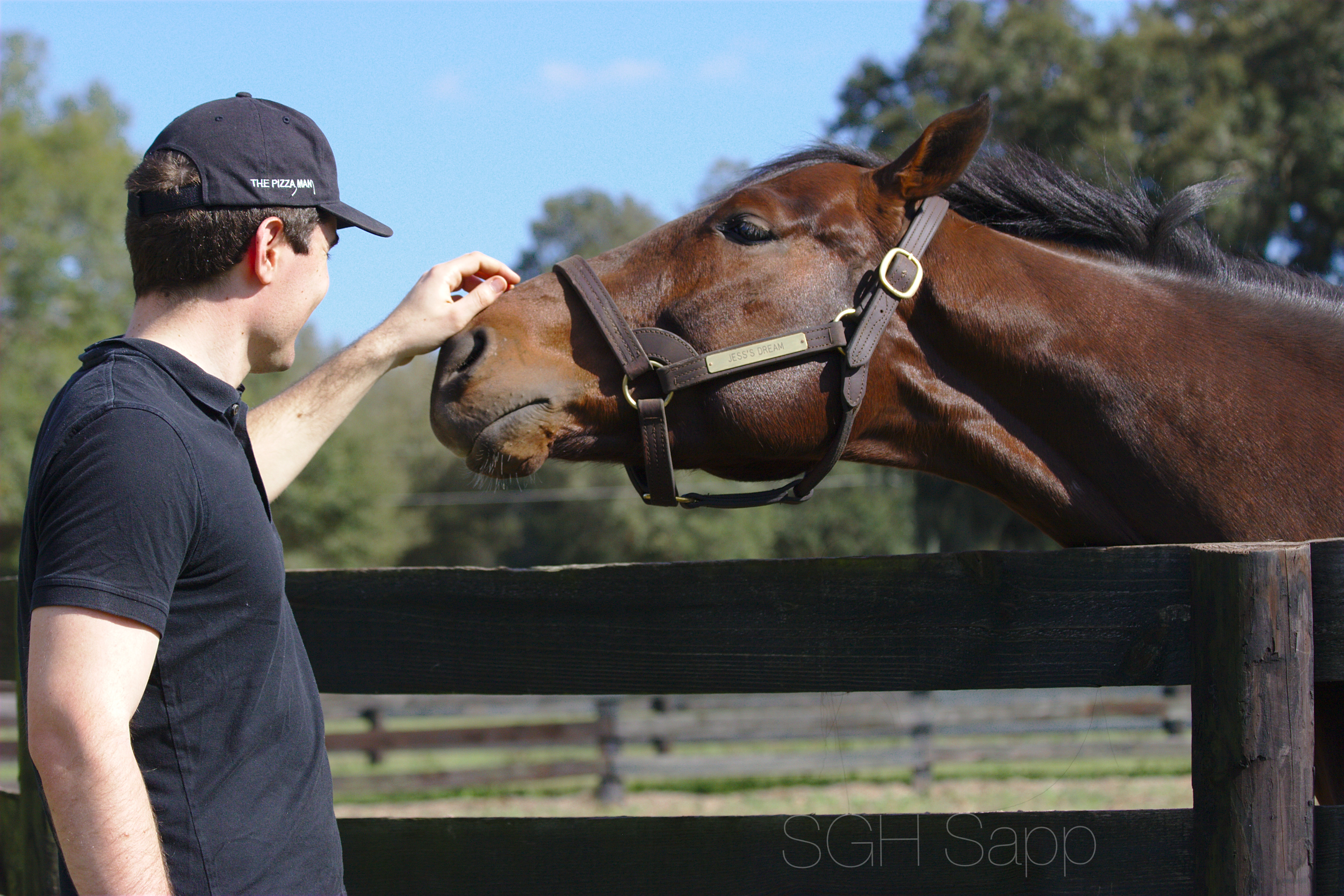
Jess's Dream at the Ocala Stud in 2017.

During the airing of the 2011 Kentucky Derby on May 7, it was announced that she was carrying a colt by Curlin and was due in February. On January 22, 2012, Rachel Alexandra gave birth to a bay colt with a star. The name of the colt was announced prior to the Curlin Stakes at Saratoga on July 27, 2012. The colt was named Jess's Dream for Jess Jackson, who had owned both. That name was selected by Banke from a contest that drew 6,521 names that fans suggested. The winning name was suggested by Samuel Bucholtz of Chino, California and Craig Duncan of Columbia, Tennessee. Jess's Dream is the first-ever offspring of two Preakness Stakes winners, Curlin having won the race in 2007 and Rachel Alexandra in 2009.

Jess's Dream broke his maiden on August 24, 2015, at Saratoga Race Course. Stepping slow out of the gate and rallying from last, he came from the far outside to run past All Rise and Securitiz. He was also ridden by John Velazquez. Jess's Dream didn't race again because of injury and was retired to stud in Ocala, Florida. He was pensioned from stud duty after the 2023 breeding season and euthanized due to laminitis on February 11, 2024.

Chess's Dream (a colt out of Achalaya, by Bellamy Road), became the first stakes winner for Jess's Dream when he won the Grade 3 Kitten's Joy Stakes on turf by three lengths on January 30, 2021.

=== Rachel's Valentina ===
On March 25, 2012, Rachel Alexandra was bred to Bernardini at Stonestreet Farm. It was confirmed in April 2012 that she was in foal. Like Jess' Dream, this foal would also be the offspring of two Preakness winners, as sire Bernardini won the 2006 edition of the race marred by the ultimately fatal leg injury of Kentucky Derby winner Barbaro. On June 23, 2012, Stonestreet announced via Twitter that "It's a GIRL!!!!" after an ultrasound was performed. On February 12, 2013, Rachel Alexandra foaled a 140-pound bay filly with a heart-shaped star on her head by Bernardini. The filly was reported to weigh 140 lbs., the heaviest foal born at Stonestreet Farm that year. The next day, Rachel Alexandra was transported to Rood & Riddle Equine Hospital in Lexington, Kentucky, where she underwent surgery on her small colon which was injured during a difficult foaling. Early on February 14, 2013, Rachel Alexandra's condition was reported as serious. Her newborn filly was placed on a nurse mare, a Quarter Horse named Miss Beautiful Ojos. On February 15, 2013, Rachel Alexandra was reported to be making good progress on her recovery. Stonestreet Farm reported that her filly had adjusted well to her nurse mare and enjoyed paddock turnout on February 14. As of February 17, Rachel Alexandra remained in serious but stable condition, and she was gradually transitioning back onto solid foods. On February 23, she was reported to be doing well and was taken off IV fluids and nutrition. Another update by Stonestreet Farm on February 28 reported that she was doing better than expected. On March 7, Rachel Alexandra was reported to be recovering well after undergoing a surgical procedure to drain an abscess adjacent to her reproductive tract and rectum. On March 26, 2013, she returned home to Stonestreet Farm to continue her recovery. As of April 16, she spent two hours at liberty in a paddock at Stonestreet Farm. It was announced in 2015 that the filly by Bernardini would be named Rachel's Valentina.

Rachel's Valentina won her two-year-old debut on August 8, 2015, by two lengths. She started awkwardly, but recovered quickly to run down Awesome Dame. She was trained by Pletcher and ridden by John Velazquez.

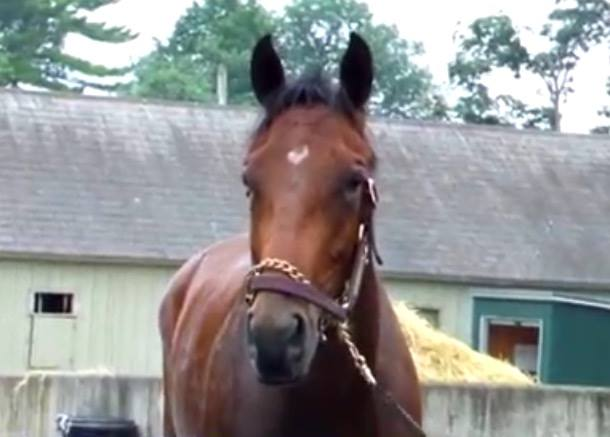
Rachel's Valentina as a two-year-old.

Six years to the day after Rachel Alexandra became the first filly or mare to win the Woodward Stakes, Rachel's Valentina won the Grade 1 Spinaway Stakes, Saratoga's premiere race for two-year-old fillies. Instead of starting in last position, she was third early on and swung to the outside around the turn, ultimately defeating a Tapit filly Tap To It. Due to her win in the Spinaway, Rachel's Valentina earned a spot in the 2015 Breeders' Cup Juvenile Fillies. She went off as the second choice and finished second to an undefeated filly named Songbird, who would go on to become a champion. Coincidentally, Songbird is by Medaglia d'Oro, sire of Rachel Alexandra.

As a 3-year-old, Rachel's Valentina finished a close second in the Grade 1 Ashland Stakes. She was then made the favorite for the 2016 Kentucky Oaks after Songbird was scratched. Rachel Alexandra had won the Kentucky Oaks by over 20 lengths but Rachel's Valentina ran close to the pace before fading to sixth. She followed this up with a fifth-place finish in the Mother Goose Stakes. On July 24, 2016, Stonestreet Stable announced that Rachel's Valentina "will now retire from racing, sound and injury-free." Rachel's Valentina was bred to Curlin in 2017.

=== Retirement ===
Even though Rachel Alexandra fully recovered from the difficult delivery of Rachel's Valentina, she has not been bred in the succeeding years. "There's always a chance she could be bred again, you can never say never, but I don't think my nerves could take it," said Barbara Banke.

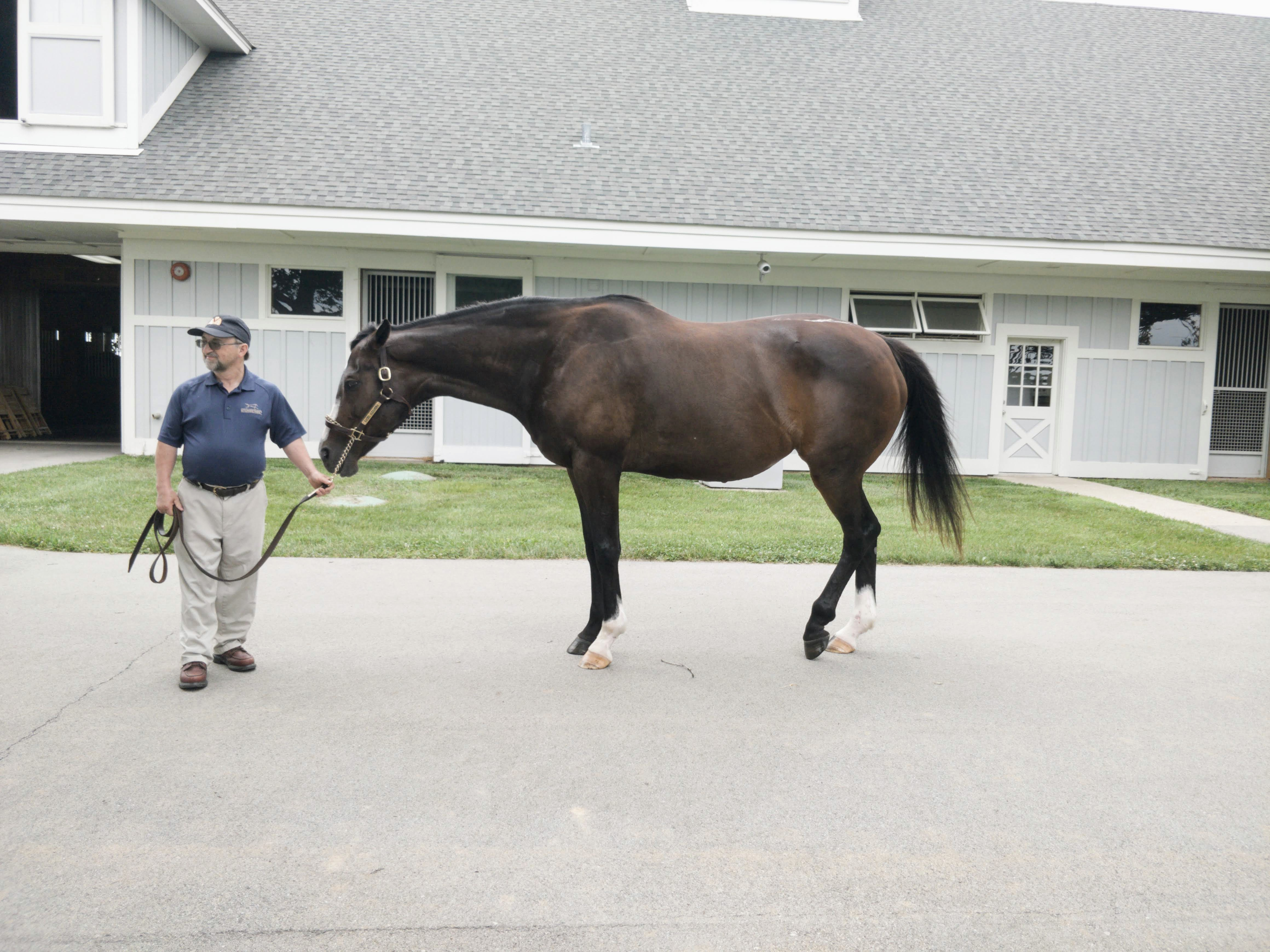
Rachel Alexandra at Stonestreet Farms in June 2018.

Stonestreet Farms previously hosted Seehel Day, where contest winners could enter for a chance to meet the horse with visits held on a select few days of the year. Stonestreet Farm now hosts paid booked tours where you can visit Rachel Alexandra.

== Honors and awards ==
On January 18, 2010, Rachel Alexandra won the most prestigious of the Eclipse Awards, the Horse of the Year award, with 130 votes, beating out rival mare Zenyatta's 99 votes. She also won the Eclipse Award for Champion Three-Year-Old Filly.

Following a widely publicized vote, all three voting blocs ultimately went for Rachel Alexandra for Horse of the Year. The National Turf Writers Association by 71 votes to 51, the Daily Racing Form by a 31 to 23, and the National Thoroughbred Racing Association 28 to 25.

Rachel Alexandra was the only 3-year-old filly to receive the Eclipse Horse of the Year Award since the Eclipse Awards began in 1971. All 232 ballots were cast for her. Prior to the advent of the Eclipse Awards, there was just the Horse of the Year Award without the rest of the Eclipse Awards. Four other 3-year-old fillies won this, Busher, Twilight Tear, Regret, and Beldame, and one 2-year-old filly (Moccasin).

On September 29, 2010, just days after Rachel Alexandra's retirement was announced, Fair Grounds Race Course renamed the Silverbulletday Stakes to the Rachel Alexandra Stakes to honor her. On April 25, 2016, Rachel Alexandra's induction into the National Museum of Racing and Hall of Fame was announced. The mare was joined by her trainer Steve Asmussen and Zenyatta in the class of 2016.

== Race record ==
Date	Track	Race	Distance	Finish
5/22/2008	Churchill Downs	Maiden	4 1/2 Furlongs	6
6/13/2008	Churchill Downs	Maiden	5 Furlongs	1
06/28/2008	Churchill Downs	Debutante Stakes	6 Furlongs	2
10/17/2008	Keeneland	Allowance	6 Furlongs	1
11/1/2008	Churchill Downs	Pocahontas Stakes	1 Mile	2
11/29/2008	Churchill Downs	Golden Rod Stakes	1 1/16 Miles	1
2/15/2009	Oaklawn Park	Martha Washington Stakes	1 Mile	1
3/14/2009	Fair Grounds Race Course	Fair Grounds Oaks	1 1/16 Miles	1
4/5/2009	Oaklawn Park	Fantasy Stakes	1 1/16 Miles	1
5/1/2009	Churchill Downs	Kentucky Oaks	1 1/8 Miles	1
5/16/2009	Pimlico	Preakness Stakes	1 3/16 Miles	1
6/27/2009	Belmont Park	Mother Goose Stakes	1 1/8 Miles	1
8/2/2009	Monmouth Park	Haskell Invitational	1 1/8 Miles	1
9/5/2009	Saratoga Race Course	Woodward Stakes	1 1/8 Miles	1
3/13/2010	Fair Grounds Race Course	New Orleans Ladies Stakes	1 1/16 Miles	2
4/30/2010	Churchill Downs	La Troienne Stakes	1 1/16 Miles	2
6/12/2010	Churchill Downs	Fleur de Lis Handicap	1 1/8 Miles	1
7/24/2010	Monmouth Park	Lady's Secret Stakes	1 1/8 Miles	1
8/29/2010	Saratoga Race Course	Personal Ensign Stakes	1 1/4 Miles	2

== Pedigree ==
Pedigree of Rachel Alexandra
Sire Medaglia d'Oro dkb/br. 1999	El Prado (IRE) gr. 1989	Sadler's Wells b. 1981	Northern Dancer (CAN)
Sire Medaglia d'Oro dkb/br. 1999	El Prado (IRE) gr. 1989	Sadler's Wells b. 1981	Fairy Bridge
Sire Medaglia d'Oro dkb/br. 1999	El Prado (IRE) gr. 1989	Lady Capulet gr. 1974	Sir Ivor
Sire Medaglia d'Oro dkb/br. 1999	El Prado (IRE) gr. 1989	Lady Capulet gr. 1974	Cap and Bells
Sire Medaglia d'Oro dkb/br. 1999	Cappucino Bay b. 1989	Bail Jumper b. 1974	Damascus
Sire Medaglia d'Oro dkb/br. 1999	Cappucino Bay b. 1989	Bail Jumper b. 1974	Court Circuit
Sire Medaglia d'Oro dkb/br. 1999	Cappucino Bay b. 1989	Dubbed In b. 1973	Silent Screen
Sire Medaglia d'Oro dkb/br. 1999	Cappucino Bay b. 1989	Dubbed In b. 1973	Society Singer
Dam Lotta Kim b. 2001	Roar b. 1993	Forty Niner b. 1985	Mr. Prospector
Dam Lotta Kim b. 2001	Roar b. 1993	Forty Niner b. 1985	File
Dam Lotta Kim b. 2001	Roar b. 1993	Wild Applause b. 1981	Northern Dancer (CAN)
Dam Lotta Kim b. 2001	Roar b. 1993	Wild Applause b. 1981	Glowing Tribute
Dam Lotta Kim b. 2001	Kims Blues b. 1993	Cure the Blues b. 1978	Stop The Music
Dam Lotta Kim b. 2001	Kims Blues b. 1993	Cure the Blues b. 1978	Quick Cure
Dam Lotta Kim b. 2001	Kims Blues b. 1993	Early Decision b. 1985	Lord Gaylord
Dam Lotta Kim b. 2001	Kims Blues b. 1993	Early Decision b. 1985	Biscayne Missy

== See also ==
- List of racehorses
