= Allaire duPont Distaff Stakes top three finishers =

This is a listing of the horses that finished in either first, second, or third place and the number of starters in the Allaire duPont Distaff Stakes, a grade 3 American Thoroughbred horse race run at 1-1/16 miles over dirt at Pimlico Race Course, in Baltimore, Maryland.

Year	Winner	Second	Third	Starters
2026	Margie’s Intention	Low Country Magic	Late Nite Call	5
2025	Candied	Dazzling Move	Regaled	6
2024	Shotgun Hottie	Musical Mischief	Queen Of Missoula	7
2023	Interstatedaydream	Misty Veil	Le Da Vida	6
2022	Super Quick	Exotic West	Frost Point	5
2021	Spice is Nice	Dreamalildreamofu	Getridofwhatailesu	8
2020	Eres Tu	Wicked Awesome	Another Broad	7
2019	Mylady Curlin	Golden Award	Gio Game	7
2018	Song of Spring	Blue Prize	Fuhriously Kissed	8
2017	Terra Promessa	Carrumba	Mo' Green	8
2016	Ahh Chocolate	Theogany	Joint Return	9
2015	Stopchargingmaria	Yahilwa	Joint Return	12
2014	No Race	No Race	No Race	0
2013	Summer Applause	Sea Island	Brushed by a Star	7
2012	Awesomemundo	Love and Pride	Catch a Thief	9
2011	Super Expresso	Payton d'Oro	Life At Ten	7
2010	No Race	No Race	No Race	0
2009	Skylighter	Unforgotten	All Smiles	5
2008	Buy the Barrel	Lexi Star	Bear Now	9
2007	Rolling Sea	Leah's Secret	Lexi Star	12
2006	Pool Land	Josh Madelyn	In the Gold	9
2005	Silmaril	Ashado	Friel's for Real	4
2004	Friel's for Real	Saintly Action	Nonsuch Bay	8
2003	Mandy's Gold	Summer Colony	Stormy Frolic	4
2002	Summer Colony	Dancethruthedawn	Happily Unbridled	7
2001	Serra Lake	Jostle	Prized Stamp	6
2000	Roza Robata	Bella Cjiarra	On a Soapbox	8
1999	Mil Kilates	Merengue	Unbridled Hope	8
1998	Ajina	Naskra Colors	Pocho's Dream Girl	8
1997	Rare Blend	Scenic Point	Aileen's Countess	5
1996	Serena's Song	Shop	Churchbell Chimes	4
1995	Pennyhill Park	Halo America	Calipha	6
1994	Double Sixes	Broad Gains	Mz. Zill Bear	6
1993	Deputation	D. Theatrical Gal	Low Tolerance	6
1992	Wilderness Song	Harbour Club	Brilliant Brass	7
