= Matchmaker Stakes =

- Class: Grade III
- Location: Monmouth Park Racetrack; Oceanport, New Jersey, United States
- Inaugurated: 1967 (at Atlantic City Race Course)
- Race type: Thoroughbred – Flat racing
- Website: Monmouth Park Racetrack

Race information
- Distance: 1 1/8 miles (9 furlongs)
- Surface: Turf
- Track: Left-handed
- Qualification: Fillies & Mares, three-years-old & older
- Weight: Base weights with allowances: 4-year-olds and up: 124 lbs. 3-year-olds: 121 lbs.
- Purse: $300,000 (since 2023)
- Bonuses: First three placegetters choice of WinStar Farm stallions (2022)

The Matchmaker Stakes is a Grade III American Thoroughbred horse race for fillies and mares age three and older run over a distance of 1 1/8 miles on the turf held annually in July at Monmouth Park Racetrack in Oceanport, New Jersey.

== History ==
The inaugural running of the event was on 30 September 1967 at Atlantic City Race Course over a distance of 1 3/16 miles on the dirt. The event concept was that additional stakes offered for the event were given to the owners for payment to breed to selected sires. The first running attracted 14 entrants and the three sires that were available for the placegetters were the 1958 US Horse of the Year Round Table, 1960 US Champion Two-Year-Old Colt Hail To Reason and the 1962 Belmont Stakes winner Jaipur. The winner of the inaugural race was the Maryland bred mare Politely who set a new track record of 1:55 1/5. Politely would win the event again the following year.

In the early years of the event in the attracted the finest mares as owners vied for the possibility of breeding to former champions that were offered as part of prizemoney. In 1973 when The American Graded Stakes Committee was founded by the Thoroughbred Owners and Breeders Association the event was immediately given the highest classification of Grade I.

In 1978 the event was moved to be run on the turf track. In 1979 the event was downgraded to Grade II.

In 1997 with diminished racing dates given to the Atlantic City Race Course the event was moved to Monmouth Park. The distance of the event was decreased to 1 1/8 miles. Also that year the event was downgraded once more to Grade III. Since 2004, the event has beene part of the Haskell Invitational day meeting.

In 2009, the Matchmaker was taken off the turf because of heavy rain in New Jersey earlier in the day. Originally carded as a Grade III event, the Matchmaker lost its graded status for that running in a decision made by the American Graded Stakes Committee shortly after it was run.

Taylor Made Stallions sponsored the Matchmaker from 2005 to 2012. The event has been supported by WinStar Farm since 2014.

== Records ==
Speed record:

- 1 1/8 miles (turf) – 1:46.19 Batique (2001)
- 1 3/16 miles (turf) – 1:53.40 Sabin (1984) & Spruce Fir (1989)
- 1 3/16 miles (dirt) – 1:54.20 Susan's Girl (1975) & Mississippi Mud (1977)

Margins:

- 7 lengths – Gallant Bloom (1969) & Captain's Lover (2009)

Most wins:

- 2 – Politely (1967, 1968)
- 2 – Starstruck (2013, 2014)

Most wins by trainer:

- 10 – Chad C. Brown (2015, 2017, 2018, 2020, 2021, 2022, 2023, 2024, 2025, 2026)

Most wins by a jockey:

- 4 – Joe Bravo (1999, 2003, 2008, 2016)

Most wins by owner:

- 2 – Bohemia Stable (1967, 1968)
- 2 - Peter Brant (1980, 2022)
- 2 - H. Joseph Allen (1980, 2003)
- 2 – Augustin Stable (1994, 1996)
- 2 – Calumet Farm (2013, 2014)

== Winners ==
Year	Winner	Age	Jockey	Trainer	Owner	Distance	Time	Purse	Grade	Ref
At Monmouth Park – Matchmaker Stakes
2026	Grayosh	5	Tyler Gaffalione	Chad C. Brown	Flanagan Racing	1 1/8 miles	1:50.99	$300,000	III	
2025	Segesta	4	Irad Ortiz Jr.	Chad C. Brown	Juddmonte Farms	1 1/8 miles	1:49.17	$300,000	III	
2024	Beaute Cachee (FR)	5	Frankie Dettori	Chad C. Brown	Louis Lazzinnaro, Madaket Stables, Michael J. Caruso & Michael Dubb	1 1/8 miles	1:49.63	$300,000	III	
2023	Consumer Spending	4	Joel Rosario	Chad C. Brown	Klaravich Stables	1 1/8 miles	1:48.00	$300,000	III	
2022	Lemista (IRE)	5	Flavien Prat	Chad C. Brown	Peter Brant	1 1/8 miles	1:47.07	$201,000	III	
2021	Great Island	5	Joel Rosario	Chad C. Brown	Alpha Delta Stables	1 1/8 miles	1:48.89	$150,000	III	
2020	Nay Lady Nay (IRE)	4	Paco Lopez	Chad C. Brown	First Row Partners & Hidden Brook Farm	1 1/8 miles	1:46.21	$152,500	III	
2019	I'm So Fancy (IRE)	5	Trevor McCarthy	Arnaud Delacour	Lael Stable	1 1/8 miles	1:51.11	$135,000	III	
2018	Elysea's World (IRE)	5	Jose L. Ortiz	Chad C. Brown	Sheep Pond Partners & All Pro Racing	1 1/8 miles	1:47.70	$102,000	III	
2017	Wekeela (FR)	5	Javier Castellano	Chad C. Brown	Martin S. Schwartz	1 1/8 miles	1:47.97	$101,000	III	
2016	Itsonlyactingdad	4	Joe Bravo	Todd A. Pletcher	Starlight Racing	1 1/8 miles	1:52.27	$110,000	III	
2015	Casual Smile (GB)	4	Abel Castellano Jr.	Chad C. Brown	William S. Farish III	1 1/8 miles	1:47.12	$162,000	III	
2014	Starstruck (IRE)	5	Kerwin D. Clark	J. Larry Jones	Calumet Farm	1 1/8 miles	1:46.35	$170,000	III	
2013	Starstruck (IRE)	4	Rosie Napravnik	J. Larry Jones	Calumet Farm	1 1/8 miles	1:49.27	$158,000	III	
2012	Laughing (IRE)	4	Rafael Bejarano	Alan E. Goldberg	Richard Santulli	1 1/8 miles	1:48.93	$150,500	III	
2011	Romacaca	5	E. T. Baird	Nick Canani	Frank Carl Calabrese	1 1/8 miles	1:46.54	$207,500	III	
2010	Unbridled Essence	4	Paco Lopez	Gregory D. Sacco	Red Oak Stables	1 1/8 miles	1:47.97	$210,000	III	
2009	Captain's Lover (SAF)	5	John R. Velazquez	Todd A. Pletcher	Team Valor International	1 1/8 miles	1:51.60	$200,000	Listed	Off turf
2008	J'ray	5	Joe Bravo	Todd A. Pletcher	Lawrence Goichman	1 1/8 miles	1:46.39	$150,000	III	
2007	Roshani	4	Garrett K. Gomez	Todd A. Pletcher	Ben McElroy	1 1/8 miles	1:47.55	$150,000	III	
2006	Ready's Gal	4	John R. Velazquez	Todd A. Pletcher	James T. Scatuorchio	1 1/8 miles	1:48.77	$150,000	III	
2005	Love Match	5	Javier Castellano	John C. Kimmel	Anne Wrenn Poulson	1 1/8 miles	1:50.20	$150,000	III	
2004	Where We Left Off (GB)	4	Corey Nakatani	Christophe Clement	Moyglare Stud	1 1/8 miles	1:48.80	$100,000	III	
Matchmaker Handicap
2003	Volga (IRE)	5	Joe Bravo	Christophe Clement	H. Joseph Allen	1 1/8 miles	1:48.20	$100,000	III	
2002	Clearly a Queen	5	Eibar Coa	Teresa M. Pompay	John A. Franks	1 1/8 miles	1:47.76	$100,000	III	
Matchmaker Stakes
2001	Batique	5	Jose C. Ferrer	Laird R. George	Helen K. Groves	1 1/8 miles	1:46.19	$100,000	III	
2000	Horatia (IRE)	4	Jose A. Santos	Christophe Clement	Gerald W. Leigh	1 1/8 miles	1:47.52	$100,000	III	
1999	Natalie Too	5	Joe Bravo	D. Wayne Lukas	Padua Stables	1 1/8 miles	1:46.81	$100,000	III	
1998	Bursting Forth	4	Mario E. Verge	H. Graham Motion	Sam Huff	1 1/8 miles	1:48.46	$100,000	III	
1997	Fleur de Nuit	4	Julie Krone	Joseph H. Pierce Jr.	Robert Greenbaum	1 1/8 miles	1:48.91	$100,000	III	
At Atlantic City Race Course
1996	Powder Bowl	4	Darci S. Rice	Jonathan E. Sheppard	Augustin Stable	1 3/16 miles	1:54.71	$100,000	II	
1995	Avie's Fancy	4	Herb McCauley	Mark C. Perlsweig	Gunsmith Stables	1 3/16 miles	1:54.19	$100,000	II	
1994	Alice Springs	4	Julie Krone	Jonathan E. Sheppard	Augustin Stable	1 3/16 miles	1:55.21	$100,000	II	
1993	Fairy Garden	5	Mike E. Smith	Roger L. Attfield	Michael J. Ryan	1 3/16 miles	1:57.81	$100,000	II	
1992	Radiant Ring (CAN)	4	Robert E. Colton	James E. Day	Jon Kelly	1 3/16 miles	1:55.92	$100,000	II	
1991	Miss Josh	5	Laffit Pincay Jr.	Barclay Tagg	Bonner Farm	1 3/16 miles	1:54.18	$150,000	II	
1990	Capades	4	Angel Cordero Jr.	Richard O'Connell	Poma Stable	1 3/16 miles	1:55.60	$150,000	II	
1989	Spruce Fir	6	Douglas B. Thomas	Harry Wells	William A. Purdey	1 3/16 miles	1:53.40	$150,000	II	
1988	Magdelaine (NZ)	5	Eddie Maple	Terry Knight	Carmen Coosa	1 3/16 miles	1:56.20	$100,000	II	
1987	Carotene (CAN)	4	Don James Seymour	Roger L. Attfield	Kinghaven Farms	1 3/16 miles	1:56.60	$100,000	II	
1986	Lake Country (CAN)	5	Vincent Bracciale Jr.	Donald Walker	Donald McIntosh	1 3/16 miles	1:54.60	$108,000	II	
1985	Key Dancer	4	Jerry D. Bailey	William J. Hirsch Jr.	Oxford Stable	1 3/16 miles	2:02.40	$230,000	II	
1984	Sabin	4	Eddie Maple	Woodford C. Stephens	Henryk de Kwiatkowski	1 3/16 miles	1:53.40	$300,000	II	
1983	Luminaire	4	Buck Thornburg	Anthony J. Bardaro	Bright View Farm	1 3/16 miles	1:56.80	$225,000	II	Off turf
1982	Hunston (GB)	4	Jean-Luc Samyn	Philip G. Johnson	Brookway Stable	1 3/16 miles	1:58.60	$255,500	II	
1981	Mairzy Doates	5	Cash Asmussen	Horatio A. Luro	Arno D. Schefler	1 3/16 miles	1:56.00	$150,000	II	
1980	Just A Game II (IRE)	4	Don Brumfield	David A. Whiteley	Peter M. Brant & H. Joseph Allen	1 3/16 miles	1:57.60	$150,000	II	
1979	Warfever (FR)	6	Jean-Luc Samyn	H. Allen Jerkens	Shirley Sucher	1 3/16 miles	2:03.20	$150,000	I	Rescheduled‡
1978	Queen Lib	3	Donald MacBeth	Harry Wells	Raritan Stable	1 3/16 miles	1:56.40	$150,000	I	
1977	Mississippi Mud	4	Jorge Enrique Tejeira	Charles Peoples	Bayard Sharp	1 3/16 miles	1:54.20	$125,000	I	
1976	§ Dancers Countess	4	Chris McCarron	Doug M. Davis Jr.	George M. Holtsinger	1 3/16 miles	1:56.00	$150,000	I	
1975	Susan's Girl	6	James D. Nichols	James L. Newman	Fred W. Hooper	1 3/16 miles	1:54.20	$150,000	I	
1974	Desert Vixen	4	Laffit Pincay Jr.	Thomas F. Root Sr.	Harry T. Mangurian Jr.	1 3/16 miles	1:55.20	$100,000	I	
1973	Alma North	5	Frank Lovato Jr.	Frank J. Zitto	Eugene Mori	1 3/16 miles	1:55.20	$100,000	I	
1972	† Numbered Account	3	Laffit Pincay Jr.	Roger Laurin	Ogden Phipps	1 3/16 miles	1:57.60	$100,000		
1971	Deceit	3	John L. Rotz	Del W. Carroll	Windfields Farm	1 3/16 miles	1:56.80	$100,000		
1970	Dedicated To Sue	4	Michael Hole	Frank Calcagni	Walnut Hill Farm	1 3/16 miles	1:56.40	$100,000		
1969	Gallant Bloom	3	John L. Rotz	Max Hirsch	King Ranch Stable	1 3/16 miles	1:55.40	$100,000		
1968	Politely	5	Ángel Cordero Jr.	George M. Baker	Bohemia Stable	1 3/16 miles	1:55.20	$100,000		
1967	Politely	4	Ray Broussard	George M. Baker	Bohemia Stable	1 3/16 miles	1:55.20	$92,500		

Legend:
Dirt Turf
Notes:
§ Ran as an entry
‡ Originally the event was scheduled for Friday, 10 August 1979, but an electrical storm forced the cancellation of the meeting and the event was redrawn and held on Wednesday, 15 August 1979.
† In the 1983 Alma North was first past the post but was disqualified for interference of the third place finisher Honestous and Numbered Account was declared the winner, Honestous was placed second and Alma North moved to third.

== See also ==
- List of American and Canadian Graded races
