= Congrats (horse) =

American thoroughbred racehorse (2000–2025)

- Breed: Thoroughbred
- Sire: A.P. Indy
- Grandsire: Seattle Slew
- Dam: Praise
- Damsire: Mr. Prospector
- Sex: Stallion
- Foaled: March 13, 2000; Kentucky, USA
- Died: July 28, 2025 (aged 25); Florida, USA
- Country: United States of America
- Breeder: Claiborne Farm & Adele Dilschneiderr
- Owner: Cloverleaf Farm II, Inc.r
- Trainer: Claude R McGaughey III →Richard Mandella →Claude R McGaughey III →Richard Mandella →Kathleen O'Connell
- Record: 26: 7-3-5
- Earnings: 998,960 USD

Major wins
- San Pasqual Handicap (2005)

Congrats (March 13, 2000 - July 28, 2025) was an American thoroughbred racehorse.

== Racing career ==
Congrats debuted and won his maiden race at the Saratoga Race Course on July 27, 2002.

Congrats won his first graded race when he won the San Pasqual Handicap in 2005. He was later sent to the 2005 Dubai World Cup, where he finished 5th behind Roses In May.

== Racing form ==
The following form is based on information available on Equibase and Racing Post.

Date	Track	Race	Grade	Finish	Jockey	Distance	Condition	Winner (2nd Place)
2002 – two-year-old season
Jul 27	Saratoga	Maiden Special Weight		1st	Pat Day	6.5 furlong	Fast	(Outer Reef)
Sept 7	Belmont	Allowance		3rd	Pat Day	7 furlong	Fast	Desert Warrior
2003 – three-year-old season
May 3	Aqueduct	Allowance		1st	John Velazquez	7 furlong	Fast	(Mister Hennessy)
June 7	Belmont	Allowance		4th	Edgar Prado	1 mile	Good	Strong Hope
July 10	Belmont	Allowance		1st	Edgar Prado	1 mile 1/2 furlong	Fast	(Poppy's Image)
Aug 3	Saratoga	Jim Dandy Stakes	GII	3rd	Mike Luzzi	1 mile 1 furlong	Fast	Strong Hope
Aug 23	Saratoga	Travers Stakes	GI	5th	Mike Luzzi	1 mile 2 furlong	Fast	Ten Most Wanted
Oct 2	Belmont	Allowance		1st	Edgar Prado	1 mile 1/8 furlong	Fast	(Thunder Blitz)
Oct 29	Aqueduct	Discovery Handicap	GIII	4th	Edgar Prado	1 mile 1 furlong	Muddy	During
2004 – four-year-old season
Apr 3	Keeneland	Allowance		1st	John Velazquez	1 mile 1/2 furlong	Fast	(American Style)
Apr 30	Churchill Downs	Alysheba Stakes	L	1st	John Velazquez	1 mile 1/2 furlong	Sloppy	(Perfect Drift)
June 12	Belmont	Brooklyn Handicap	GII	5th	Javier Castellano	1 mile 1 furlong	Fast	Seattle Fitz
Jul 31	Arlington	Washington Park Handicap	GII	3rd	R. Douglas	1 mile 1/2 furlong	Fast	Eye of the Tiger
Aug 22	Saratoga	Saratoga Breeders' Cup Handicap	GII	6th	John Velazquez	1 mile 2 furlong	Fast	Evening Attire
Dec 11	Hollywood Park	Native Diver Handicap	GIII	6th	Tyler Baze	1 mile 1 furlong	Fast	Truly a Judge
2005 – five-year-old season
Jan 8	Santa Anita	San Pasqual Handicap	GII	1st	Tyler Baze	1 mile 110 yards	Sloppy	(Total Impact)
Feb 6	Santa Anita	San Antonio Handicap	GII	3rd	Tyler Baze	1 mile 1 furlong	Fast	Lundy's Liability
Mar 5	Santa Anita	Santa Anita Handicap	GI	2nd	Tyler Baze	1 mile 2 furlong	Fast	Rock Hard Ten
Mar 26	Nad Al Sheba	Dubai World Cup	GI	5th	Tyler Baze	2000 meter	Fast	Roses In May
June 11	Hollywood Park	Ack Ack Handicap	L	2nd	Tyler Baze	7.5 furlongs	Fast	McCann's Mojave
July 9	Hollywood Park	Hollywood Gold Cup Handicap	GI	3rd	Tyler Baze	1 mile 2 furlong	Fast	Lava Man
Aug 21	Del Mar	Pacific Classic Stakes	GI	8th	Tyler Baze	1 mile 2 furlong	Fast	Borrego
2006 – six-year-old season
Feb 18	Santa Anita	San Carlos Handicap	GII	7th	T. Baze	7 furlongs	Fast	Surf Cat
Apr 1	Santa Anita	Tokyo City Handicap	GIII	7th	T. Baze	1 mile 1 furlong	Fast	Preachinatthebar
May 29	Calder	Memorial Day Handicap	GIII	2nd	Daniel Centeno	1 mile 1/2 furlong	Fast	Siphon City
July 1	Prairie Meadows	Prairie Meadows Cornhusker Breeders' Cup Handicap	GII	9th	Daniel Centeno	1 mile 1 furlong	Fast	Siphon City

== Stud Record ==
After retiring from racing, he was sent to the Cloverleaf Farms in Florida to stand stud in 2007. The following year, the horse was sent to Vinery Stud and later to WinStar Farm in 2013. Congrats' most successful progeny is Turbulent Descent, who won multiple graded races including the Santa Anita Oaks.

In addition, Congrats is a successful damsire; having sired the dams of both Caravel (Breeders' Cup Turf Sprint) and Shedaresthedevil (Kentucky Oaks). He is also a successful damsire in Japan, having sired the dams of both Danon Decile (Tōkyō Yūshun, Dubai Sheema Classic) and Forever Young (Tokyo Daishōten, Saudi Cup, Breeders' Cup Classic).

=== Notable progeny ===
c = colt, f = filly, g = gelding

Foaled	Name	Sex	Major Wins
2008	Turbulent Descent	f	Santa Anita Oaks, Test Stakes, Ballerina Stakes, Hollywood Starlet Stakes
2008	Wickedly Perfect	f	Alcibiades Stakes
2009	Emma's Encore	f	Prioress Stakes, Victory Ride Stakes
2011	Haveyougoneaway	f	Ballerina Stakes
2013	Forever Darling	f	Santa Ynez Stakes

He retired from stud duty in 2021 and was pensioned at WinStar Farm. On July 28, 2025, Congrats died due to natural causes at the age of 25.

== Pedigree ==
Pedigree of Congrats
Sire A.P. Indy 1989 dk.b.	Seattle Slew; 1974 dk.b.	Bold Reasoning	Boldnesian
Sire A.P. Indy 1989 dk.b.	Seattle Slew; 1974 dk.b.	Bold Reasoning	Reason to Earn
Sire A.P. Indy 1989 dk.b.	Seattle Slew; 1974 dk.b.	My Charmer	Poker
Sire A.P. Indy 1989 dk.b.	Seattle Slew; 1974 dk.b.	My Charmer	Fair Charmer
Sire A.P. Indy 1989 dk.b.	Weekend Surprise; 1980 b.	Secretariat	Bold Ruler
Sire A.P. Indy 1989 dk.b.	Weekend Surprise; 1980 b.	Secretariat	Somethingroyal
Sire A.P. Indy 1989 dk.b.	Weekend Surprise; 1980 b.	Lassie Dear	Buckpasser
Sire A.P. Indy 1989 dk.b.	Weekend Surprise; 1980 b.	Lassie Dear	Gay Missile
Dam Praise 1994 b.	Mr. Prospector; 1970 b.	Raise a Native	Native Dancer
Dam Praise 1994 b.	Mr. Prospector; 1970 b.	Raise a Native	Raise You
Dam Praise 1994 b.	Mr. Prospector; 1970 b.	Gold Digger	Nashua
Dam Praise 1994 b.	Mr. Prospector; 1970 b.	Gold Digger	Sequence
Dam Praise 1994 b.	Wild Applause; 1981 b.	Northern Dancer	Nearctic
Dam Praise 1994 b.	Wild Applause; 1981 b.	Northern Dancer	Natalma
Dam Praise 1994 b.	Wild Applause; 1981 b.	Glowing Tribute	Graustark
Dam Praise 1994 b.	Wild Applause; 1981 b.	Glowing Tribute	Admiring
