= Molly Pitcher Stakes =

- Class: Grade II
- Location: Monmouth Park; Oceanport, New Jersey, United States
- Inaugurated: 1946
- Race type: Thoroughbred - Flat racing
- Website: www.monmouthpark.com

Race information
- Distance: 1 1/16 miles (8.5 furlongs)
- Surface: Dirt
- Track: left-handed
- Qualification: Fillies & Mares, three-years-old & up
- Weight: Assigned
- Purse: $100,000 (2016)

The Molly Pitcher Stakes is an American Thoroughbred horse race raced annually during the last week of August at Monmouth Park in Oceanport, New Jersey. The race is open to fillies and mares, age three and up, over one and one-sixteenth miles on the dirt. This Grade II event currently carries a purse of $100,000.

In 1951, the Molly Pitcher was the first race in the United States ever to be televised in color.

The Molly Pitcher was reduced from a Grade II to a Grade III event in 2015 and had its purse lowered. The event would be upgraded back to Grade II in 2026.

== Records ==
Speed record:

- 1:40.47 - Search Results (2022)

Most wins:

- 2 - Politely (1967, 1968)
- 2 - Hystericalady (2007, 2008)

Most wins by a jockey:

- 5 - Pat Day (1985, 1986, 1996, 1998, 2000)

Most wins by a trainer:

- 6 - Todd A. Pletcher (2005, 2011, 2014, 2015, 2016, 2021)

Most wins by an owner:

- 2 - Christiana Stables (1948, 1973)
- 2 - Wheatley Stable (1955, 1966)
- 2 - Bohemia Stable (1967, 1968)
- 2 - H. Joseph Allen (1981, 1997)
- 2 - Stephen D. Peskoff (1983, 1987)
- 2 - Edward P. Evans (2003, 2011)
- 2 - Rancho San Miguel et la. (2007, 2008)
- 2 - Klaravich Stables (2022, 2025)

== Winners ==
Year	Winner	Age	Jockey	Trainer	Owner	Time<be>
2026	Splendora	5	Flavien Prat	Bob Baffert	Boyd Racing (Randy Boyd) and By Talla Racing	1:44.75
2025	Randomized	5	Flavien Prat	Chad C. Brown	Klaravich Stables	1:42.75
2024	Idiomatic	5	Florent Geroux	Brad H. Cox	Juddmonte	1:44.53
2023	Shotgun Hottie	4	Paco Lopez	Cherie DeVaux	Omar Aldabbagh & Jeff Ganje	1:43.43
2022	Search Results	4	Flavien Prat	Chad C. Brown	Klaravich Stables	1:40.47
2021	Graceful Princess	5	Joel Rosario	Todd Pletcher	Whisper Hill Farm	1:41.67
2020	Horoligist	4	Joe Bravo	William I. Mott	There's a Chance Stable et al.	1:43.48
2019	Midnight Bisou	4	Mike E. Smith	Steve Asmussen	Bloom Racing Stable et al.	1:43.55
2018	Berned	4	Joe Bravo	H. Graham Motion	West Point Thoroughbreds, et al.	1:44.52
2017	Money'soncharlotte	5	Paco Lopez	Kelly Breen	George E. Hall	1:42.80
2016	Genre	4	Paco Lopez	Todd Pletcher	Cheyenne Stables	1:43.10
2015	Got Lucky	4	Paco Lopez	Todd Pletcher	Hill 'n' Dale Farms/Steinberg	1:44.12
2014	Majestic River	4	Rosie Napravnik	Todd Pletcher	Natrona Racing Stable	1:43.11
2013	Joyful Victory	5	Rosie Napravnik	J. Larry Jones	Fox Hill Farms	1:46.09
2012	Brushed by a Star	4	Corey Nakatani	Grant T. Forster	Team Forster	1:44.15
2011	Quiet Giant	4	Julien Leparoux	Todd Pletcher	Edward P. Evans	1:43.32
2010	Just Jenda	4	Terry J. Thompson	Cindy Jones	J. Larry & Cindy Jones	1:43.52
2009	Luna Vega	4	Elvis Trujillo	Steve Asmussen	Millennium Farms	1:41.91
2008	Hystericalady	5	Robby Albarado	Jerry Hollendorfer	Rancho San Miguel et al.	1:43.21
2007	Hystericalady	4	Eddie Castro	Jerry Hollendorfer	Rancho San Miguel et al.	1:41.85
2006	Promenade Girl	4	Jeremy Rose	Lawrence E. Murray	Sondra D. Bender	1:42.98
2005	Capeside Lady	4	Chris DeCarlo	Todd A. Pletcher	So Madcapt Stable	1:41.49
2004	La Reason	4	Chuck C. Lopez	David R. Vance	K & K Racing Stable	1:51.10
2003	Summer Colony	5	Gary Stevens	Mark A. Hennig	Edward P. Evans	1:51.83
2002	Atelier	5	Eibar Coa	C. R. McGaughey III	Alexander & Groves	1:48.63
2001	March Magic	4	Mike Luzzi	Richard Violette Jr.	Ralph M. Evans Jr.	1:43.79
2000	Lu Ravi	5	Pat Day	Carl E. Bowman	Yoshio Fujita	1:43.17
1999	Heritage of Gold	4	Casey Lambert	Steve Asmussen	Jack Garey	1:41.76
1998	Relaxing Rhythm	4	Pat Day	Patrick B. Byrne	Stronach Stable	1:42.30
1997	Rare Blend	4	Mike E. Smith	C. R. McGaughey III	H. Joseph Allen	1:43.60
1996	Halo America	6	Pat Day	Bobby C. Barnett	John A. Franks	1:41.60
1995	Inside Information	4	Mike E. Smith	C. R. McGaughey III	Ogden Mills Phipps	1:43.81
1994	Hey Hazel	4	Chuck C. Lopez	Roger Attfield	Mickey Canino	1:46.41
1993	Wilderness Song	5	David Clark	James E. Day	Sam-Son Farm	1:44.79
1992	Versailles Treaty	4	Mike E. Smith	C. R. McGaughey III	Cynthia Phipps	1:43.18
1991	Valay Maid	4	Marco Castaneda	Ben W. Perkins Jr.	Frank P. Wright	1:43.80
1990	A Penny Is a Penny	5	Aaron Gryder	Steven Morguelan	David L. Levitch	1:43.40
1989	Bodacious Tatas	4	Rick Wilson	John C. Kimmel	Aspen Stable	1:42.40
1988	Personal Ensign	4	Randy Romero	C. R. McGaughey III	Ogden Phipps	1:41.80
1987	Reel Easy	4	Herb McCauley	Mickey Preger	Stephen D. Peskoff	1:42.00
1986	Lady's Secret	4	Pat Day	D. Wayne Lukas	Eugene V. Klein	1:41.20
1985	Sefa's Beauty	6	Pat Day	William I. Mott	Farid Sefa	1:42.60
1984	Sultry Sun	4	Mickey Solomone	Patrick J. Kelly	Live Oak Racing	1:41.60
1983	Ambassador of Luck	4	Antonio Graell	Mitchell C. Preger	Envoy Stable	1:41.20
1982	Jameela	6	Jack Kaenel	Hyman M. Ravich	Peter M. Brant	1:42.60
1981	Weber City Miss	4	Ruben Hernandez	Howard M. Tesher	H. Joseph Allen	1:44.00
1980	Plankton	4	Vince Bracciale Jr.	Howard M. Tesher	Frederick K. Tesher	1:44.20
1979	Navajo Princess	5	Craig Perret	Douglas Dodson	Glen Oaks Farm	1:43.40
1978	Creme Wave	4	Don MacBeth	Charles P. Sanborn	Seth Beller	1:45.20
1977	Dottie's Doll	4	Craig Perret	Paul A. Healy	Joseph R. Daly	1:41.80
1976	Garden Verse	4	Frank Lovato Sr.	James P. Conway	Niblick Stable	1:46.00
1975	Honky Star	4	Jorge Tejeira	David R. Vance	Dan Lasater	1:43.00
1974	Lady Love	4	Michael Hole	Frank Catrone	Ada L. Rice	1:43.80
1973	Light Hearted	4	Eldon Nelson	Henry S. Clark	Christiana Stables	1:41.40
1972	Out in Space	5	Carlos Barrera	Beverly P. Hacker	Milton Polinger	1:43.80
1971	Double Delta	5	Kennard Knapp	Stanley M. Rieser	Drymond/Greenslit	1:42.80
1970	Double Ripple	5	Eldon Nelson	John Tammaro Jr.	Victor Mosca	1:44.00
1969	Singing Rain	4	Ray Broussard	Oscar White	Walter M. Jeffords Jr.	1:43.80
1968	Politely	5	Angel Cordero Jr.	George M. Baker	Bohemia Stable	1:45.00
1967	Politely	4	William Boland	George M. Baker	Bohemia Stable	1:44.20
1966	Discipline	4	Ray Broussard	Edward A. Neloy	Wheatley Stable	1:43.60
1965	Miss Cavandish	4	Howard Grant	Roger Laurin	Harry S. Nichols	1:44.60
1964	Spicy Living	4	Manuel Ycaza	Jimmy Rowe	Eleonora Sears	1:43.20
1963	Patrol Woman	4	Steve Brooks	Kenny Noe Sr.	Mrs. Joseph A. Goodwin	1:44.40
1962	Primonetta	4	Braulio Baeza	James P. Conway	Darby Dan Farm	1:42.40
1961	Shirley Jones	5	Howard Grant	James W. Smith	Brae Burn Farm	1:43.20
1960	Royal Native	4	Bill Hartack	Peter F. Gacicia	William B. MacDonald	1:43.80
1959	Miss Orestes	4	Larry Gilligan	Sidney Culver	Alfred T. Taylor	1:45.60
1958	Searching	6	Harold Keene	Hirsch Jacobs	Ethel D. Jacobs	1:44.20
1957	Manotick	5	John Choquette	Casey Hayes	Christopher Chenery	1:42.80
1956	Blue Sparkler	4	Ovie Scurlock	Harry M. Wells	Woodland Farm	1:44.60
1955	Misty Morn	3	Sam Boulmetis	James Fitszimmons	Wheatley Stable	1:45.40
1954	Shady Tune	4	Walter Blum	Nate L. Byer	Carolyn K Stable	1:44.00
1953	My Celeste	7	Logan Batcheller	William S. Cotton	Constance Morabito	1:47.60
1952	Dixie Flyer	5	Porter Roberts	Harold O. Simmons	Duntreath Farm	1:45.40
1951	Marta	4	Conn McCreary	Woody Stephens	Woodvale Farm	1:46.20
1950	Danger Ahead	4	Herb Lindberg	E. Barnes	H. W. Fingher	1:46.20
1949	Allie's Pal	4	John Gilbert	Morrie Sidell	S. D. Sidell	1:46.20
1948	Camargo	4	Carson Kirk	Henry S. Clark	Christiana Stables	1:45.40
1947	Elpis	5	Frank Moon	Arthur Skelton	William G. Helis	1:45.00
1946	Mahmoudess	4	Merritt A. Buxton	Hirsch Jacobs	Joseph G. Dushock	1:46.60
