= Monmouth Beach Stakes =

- Class: Ungraded
- Location: Monmouth Park; Oceanport, New Jersey
- Race type: Thoroughbred – Flat racing
- Website: http://www.monmouthpark.com

Race information
- Distance: 1,830 yd (1,670 m)
- Track: Left-handed
- Qualification: Three-year-old & up Fillies and Mares
- Weight: Assigned
- Purse: $75,000

The Monmouth Beach Stakes is an American Thoroughbred horse race run annually at Monmouth Park Racetrack in Oceanport, New Jersey.

Raced near the end of May, it is open to fillies and mares, age three and older. It is contested on dirt at a distance of one mile and seventy yards. Weights are assigned at 117 lb (53 kg). for three-year-olds and at 124 lb (56 kg) for older horses, plus specific allowances. It currently offers a purse of $70,000.

The Monmouth Beach Stakes has been raced at various distances, recently at 1 mile (1.6 km) in 2002 and 2007, 1 1/16 mi (1.7 km) in 2003, 2004 and 1 1/8 miles (1.8 km) in 2005.

Past winners include the Canadian Horse Racing Hall of Fame inductee Wilderness Song who won in 1993.

== Winners of the Monmouth Beach Stakes since 2000 ==
Year	Winner	Age	Jockey	Trainer	Owner	Time
2015	Stiffed	4	Gabriel Saez	John F. Mazza	Holly Crest Farm	1:41.25
2014	Natalie Victoria	6	José Ortiz	Michelle Nevin	James A. Riccio	1:41.41
2013	Zucchini Flower	4	Jeremy Rose	H. Graham Motion	Albert Frassetto	1:39.83
2012	Nefertini	4	Carlos Marquez Jr.	Alan Goldberg	Robert E. Masterson	1:43.06
2011	C C's Pal	4	Kendrick Carmouche	Derek S. Ryan	Eric Fein	1:42.77
2010	Just Jenda	4	Terry J. Thompson	Cindy Jones	J. Larry & Cindy Jones	1:42.07
2009	Maren's Meadow	3	Justin Shepherd	Larry Jones	River Ridge Ranch	1:40.53
2008	For Kisses	5	Carlos Marquez Jr.	Richard W. Small	Buckingham Farm	1:41.71
2007	Maizelle	4	Chris DeCarlo	Todd Pletcher	Aaron & Marie Jones	1:36.31
2006	Emerald Earrings	5	Eddie Castro	Bruce Alexander	Daniel A. Herrmann	1:43.18
2005	Capeside Lady	4	Chris DeCarlo	Todd Pletcher	So Madcapt Stable	1:45.08
2004	Pocus Hocus	6	Eibar Coa	James A. Jerkens	Susan & John Moore	1:44.32
2003	Tonight's Wager	5	Dale Beckner	William I. Mott	Ervin Rodriquez	1:43.54
2002	Southern Fiction	4	José Vélez Jr.	Victoria Oliver	G. Watts Humphrey Jr.	1:39.27
2001	Wittenberg	4	Dale Beckner	Victoria Oliver	G. Watts Humphrey Jr.	1:41.85
2000	Too Too Divine	5	Marland Suckie	John J. Fee	Charles C. Lenz Jr.	1:40.99
