= Payton d'Oro =

American-bred Thoroughbred racehorse

- Sire: Medaglia d'Oro
- Grandsire: A.P. Indy
- Dam: Jealous and Jaded
- Damsire: Jade Hunter
- Sex: Mare
- Foaled: 2006
- Country: United States
- Colour: Bay
- Breeder: T/C Stable & James Carter
- Owner: John Ferris & Mike Pressley
- Trainer: J. Larry Jones
- Record: 19: 6-7-2
- Earnings: $573,835

Major wins
- Black-Eyed Susan Stakes (2009); Remington Park Oaks (2009); Instant Racing Stakes (2009); Bayakoa Stakes (2010)
- Last updated on September 5, 2011

Payton d'Oro (foaled 2006 in Kentucky) is an American Thoroughbred racehorse. She has won four of her last five outings. She was a September Keeneland Sales graduate that sold for only $35,000 in September 2007 as a yearling. The daughter of Medaglia d'Oro will best be remembered for posting a 1¼-length score in the mile and an eighth Grade II $250,000 Black-Eyed Susan Stakes at Pimlico Race Course on May 15, 2009.

== Three-year-old season ==
Trained by J. Larry Jones, she previously notched a 4-¾ length score in the one mile $75,000 Instant Racing Stakes at Oaklawn Park on April 11, 2009. After winning three straight races at Oaklawn Park in the spring of her sophomore season, her connections decided to enter her in the second jewel of America's de facto Filly Triple Crown, the Black-eyed Susan Stakes.

Payton d'Oro was the third choice at 5–2 at post time in a strong field of eight stakes winners. As the gates opened up, she sprang out to a quick lead trailed closely by 35-1 longshot Stage Trick as they passed the stands at Pimlico for the first time. With three furlongs to go in the race, the 8-5 favorite Cassanova Move pulled up on close to the two front runners. In the meantime, 7-1 Bon Jovi Girl made a bold rush on the rail passing both Stage Trick and Cassanova Move. The leader Payton d'Oro had a little left in the tank and held on to beat Bon Jovi Girl by 1-1/2 lengths.

Later in her three-year-old season the John Ferris and Mike Pressley filly Payton d'Oro topped a field of nine entered in the $125,000 Susan's Girl Stakes at Delaware Park. The mile and a sixteenth test for fillies is the local prep for the mile and a sixteenth $250,000 Grade II Delaware Oaks run on July 18. Both Payton d'Oro and her rival Bon Jovi Girl disappointed their fans that day finishing sixth and fourth respectively.

Payton d'Oro won her next race in October of her sophomore season when she moved to the lead soon after the opening quarter mile of the race in the $200,000 Remington Park Oaks. Once she assumed control of the lead she never looked back and won by a one-length margin in the 1-1/16 mile race. She beat Multipass who finished second by a nose in front of the late-running Peach Brew for third.

== Four-year-old season ==
Payton d'Oro won the Bayakoa Stakes at one mile and one sixteenth on dirt at Oaklawn Park in April of her junior season. She has a career record of six wins and four seconds from fourteen starts with career earnings $415,183 for the bay filly.

Owned by John Ferris and Mike Pressley, Payton d'Oro was bred in Kentucky by T/C Stable and James Carter. Out of the Jade Hunter mare Jealous and Jaded, she was sold at the 2007 Keeneland September yearling sale for $35,000.

== Five-year-old season ==
Payton d'Oro finished off the board in her 2011 debut in a stakes race at Oaklawn Park. In her second start of the year she finished second by a head to Bobby Flay's Super Expresso in the one and one sixteenth mile grade two Allaire duPont Distaff Stakes at Pimlico Race Course on the Saturday Preakness Stakes undercard. On June 18, 2011, Payton d'Oro made a mad dash on the leaders in deep stretch from mid-pack in the Ogden Phipps Handicap at Belmont Park. She moved from fourth to second pressing the leader but fell a length and one half short at the wire to the winner Awesome Maria. Payton placed second in the $250,000 grade one stakes race. It was the twelfth time in 17 races that Payton d'Oro finished first or second. On July 31, 2011, Payton d'Oro raced in the grade one $250,000 Ruffian Handicap and finished third to Ask the Moon and Super Expresso. On September 3, 2011, Payton d'Oro raced in the grade two $250,000 Molly Pitcher Stakes at Monmouth Park and placed second to Quiet Giant in the one and one sixteenth mile race on the dirt.

== Pedigree ==
Pedigree of Payton d'Oro
Sire Medaglia d'Oro	El Prado	Sadler's Wells	Northern Dancer
Sire Medaglia d'Oro	El Prado	Sadler's Wells	Fairy Bridge
Sire Medaglia d'Oro	El Prado	Lady Capulet	Sir Ivor
Sire Medaglia d'Oro	El Prado	Lady Capulet	Cap and Bells
Sire Medaglia d'Oro	Cappucino Bay	Bailjumper	Damascus
Sire Medaglia d'Oro	Cappucino Bay	Bailjumper	Court Circuit
Sire Medaglia d'Oro	Cappucino Bay	Dubbed In	Silent Screen
Sire Medaglia d'Oro	Cappucino Bay	Dubbed In	Society Singer
Dam Jealous and Jaded	Jade Hunter	Mr. Prospector	Raise a Native
Dam Jealous and Jaded	Jade Hunter	Mr. Prospector	Gold Digger
Dam Jealous and Jaded	Jade Hunter	Jadana	Pharly
Dam Jealous and Jaded	Jade Hunter	Jadana	Janina
Dam Jealous and Jaded	Cosmic Tiger	Tim the Tiger	Nashua
Dam Jealous and Jaded	Cosmic Tiger	Tim the Tiger	Rose Court
Dam Jealous and Jaded	Cosmic Tiger	Cosmic Law	Delta Judge
Dam Jealous and Jaded	Cosmic Tiger	Cosmic Law	White Moon
