= Lana du Pont =

American equestrian (1939–2025)

Personal information
- Full name: Helena Allaire du Pont Wright
- Born: July 6, 1939; Philadelphia, Pennsylvania, U.S.
- Died: April 23, 2025 (aged 85); Chesapeake City, Maryland, U.S.

Sport
- Sport: Equestrian

Helena Allaire "Lana" du Pont Wright (July 6, 1939 – April 23, 2025) was an American equestrian. A member of the Du Pont family and the daughter of Allaire du Pont, she competed in two events at the 1964 Summer Olympics. She was the first woman to take part in three-day eventing at the Olympics. She was married to veterinarian William H. “Bud” Wright, who died in 2010. Additionally, her daughter Beale Morris, who died in 2005 at age 34, was an eventer shortlisted for the 2000 Olympic team.

Lana du Pont Wright died at her home in Chesapeake City, Maryland, on April 23, 2025, at the age of 85.
