= Lovely Maria =

American-bred Thoroughbred racehorse

- Sire: Majesticperfection
- Grandsire: Harlan's Holiday
- Dam: Thundercup
- Damsire: Thunder Gulch
- Sex: Filly
- Foaled: 23 April 2012
- Country: United States
- Colour: Bay
- Breeder: Olin B Gentry & Thomas B Gaines
- Owner: Brereton Jones
- Trainer: J. Larry Jones
- Record: 8: 4-3-0
- Earnings: $960,600

Major wins
- Ashland Stakes (2015); Kentucky Oaks (2015)

Lovely Maria (foaled 23 April 2012) is an American Thoroughbred racehorse. After winning two of her first six races she recorded her first major win in the Ashland Stakes in April 2015 before winning the Kentucky Oaks on May 1.

== Background ==
Lovely Maria is a bay filly with a white blaze bred in Kentucky by Olin B Gentry & Thomas B Gaines. She is from the first crop of foals sired by Majesticperfection, a lightly raced sprinter who recorded his biggest win in the Alfred G Vanderbilt Handicap. Her dam, Thundercup, is an unraced daughter of the Kentucky Derby winner Thunder Gulch and a half-sister of the multiple Graded stakes race winner Rare Blend.

Lovely Maria was sent into training with J. Larry Jones, who had previously had great success with fillies and mares including Eight Belles, Proud Spell and Havre de Grace. She has been ridden in all of her races by the veteran jockey Kerwin "Boo Boo" Clark.

== Racing career ==
=== 2014: two-year-old season ===
Lovely Maria began her racing career in a five furlong maiden race at Delaware Park Racetrack on September 4. She raced in third place until the straight and then finished strongly to win by three-quarters of a length from Souba Sue. She then finished second to Sarah Sis in an allowance race over 6 1/2 furlongs at Keeneland Racecourse on October 11 and then ran second again in a similar event at Fair Grounds Race Course in November. On her final start of the year the filly was moved up in class and distance for the Trapeze Stakes over one mile at Remington Park in December. She was favored in the betting but finished fourth of the eleven runners behind Zooming.

=== 2015: three-year-old season ===
On her three-year-old debut Lovely Maria won a minor race at Fair Grounds on January 26, beating Shook Up by 2 1/2 lengths. She then finished second to her stablemate I'm A Chatterbox in the Grade II Rachel Alexandra Stakes at the same track four weeks later. On April 4 the filly was stepped up in class for the Grade I Ashland Stakes at Keeneland Racecourse and started favorite against six opponents headed by Angela Renee, a filly who had won the Chandelier Stakes and started favorite for the Breeders' Cup Juvenile Fillies. After racing in third place she took the lead in the straight and drew away to win by 3 1/4 lengths from Angela Renee. The win, which earned the filly place in the field for the Kentucky Oaks, was the first at the highest level for the 56-year-old Kerwin Clark.

On May 1, in front of a record crowd of 123,763, Lovely Maria started 6.3/1 fifth choice in the betting for the Kentucky Oaks. The favorite was Stellar Wind (winner of the Santa Anita Oaks) ahead of Condo Commando (Gazelle Stakes), Birdatthewire (Gulfstream Oaks) and I'm A Chatterbox, whilst the outsiders included Angela Renee, Sarah Sis and Shook Up. Clark settled the filly in fourth before moving up to challenge Angela Renee for the lead entering the straight. She took the lead a furlong out and quickly went clear of her rivals, winning by 2 1/2 lengths from Shook Up with I'm A Chatterbox taking third.

Lovely Maria failed to win in three subsequent races. She finished fifth in the Delaware Oaks, sixth in the Alabama Stakes and fifth in the Spinster Stakes. she has been sold to Japanese interests for an undisclosed amount.

== Pedigree ==
Pedigree of Lovely Maria, bay filly, 2012
Sire Majesticperfection (US) 2006	Harlan's Holiday (US); 1999	Harlan	Storm Cat
Sire Majesticperfection (US) 2006	Harlan's Holiday (US); 1999	Harlan	Country Romance
Sire Majesticperfection (US) 2006	Harlan's Holiday (US); 1999	Christmas in Aiken	Affirmed
Sire Majesticperfection (US) 2006	Harlan's Holiday (US); 1999	Christmas in Aiken	Dowager
Sire Majesticperfection (US) 2006	Act So Noble (US); 1999	Wavering Monarch	Majestic Light
Sire Majesticperfection (US) 2006	Act So Noble (US); 1999	Wavering Monarch	Uncommitted
Sire Majesticperfection (US) 2006	Act So Noble (US); 1999	Driven to Drink	Inverness Drive
Sire Majesticperfection (US) 2006	Act So Noble (US); 1999	Driven to Drink	Miami Springs
Dam Thundercup (US) 2005	Thunder Gulch (US); 1992	Gulch	Mr. Prospector
Dam Thundercup (US) 2005	Thunder Gulch (US); 1992	Gulch	Jameela
Dam Thundercup (US) 2005	Thunder Gulch (US); 1992	Line Of Thunder	Storm Bird
Dam Thundercup (US) 2005	Thunder Gulch (US); 1992	Line Of Thunder	Shoot A Line
Dam Thundercup (US) 2005	Buttercup (US); 1982	Baldski	Nijinsky
Dam Thundercup (US) 2005	Buttercup (US); 1982	Baldski	Too Bald
Dam Thundercup (US) 2005	Buttercup (US); 1982	Butter Fat	Prince Taj
Dam Thundercup (US) 2005	Buttercup (US); 1982	Butter Fat	Royal Butterfly (Family: 5-g)
