= Joyful Victory =

Canadian-bred Thoroughbred racehorse

- Sire: Tapit
- Grandsire: Pulpit
- Dam: Wild Lucy Black
- Damsire: Wild Again
- Sex: Mare
- Foaled: February 2, 2008
- Country: United States
- Colour: Grey
- Breeder: William D. Graham
- Owner: Fox Hill Farm
- Trainer: J. Larry Jones
- Record: 20: 7-5-4
- Earnings: $1,252,579

Major wins
- Fantasy Stakes (2011); Honeybee Stakes (2011); Tiffany Lass Stakes (2012); Houston Ladies Classic (2013); Santa Margarita Invitational Handicap (2013); Molly Pitcher Stakes (2013)

Joyful Victory is an Ontario bred Thoroughbred, foaled in 2008.

== Background ==
Despite being bred in Canada, she would never race there. Bred by William D. Graham - Ontario's 2012 Breeder of the Year - her sire is the champion stallion, Tapit; making her one of his sixteen millionaire graded winners. She was in fact his leading stakes earner in 2013. Her dam, Wild Lucy Black, is a one time winning mare by the stallion Wild Again. In February 2010, she was purchased by Fox Hill Farm at select two-year-old in training sale for $400,000. At two, she was started by trainer Tony Dutrow, and he got her through her first season and pointed her towards her first two stakes races; one of which she hit the board with a promising performance. At three, she was put under the watchful eye of trainer, Larry Jones, who would stick with her till the end of her racing career.

== Racing career ==
At two years old, Joyful Victory showed promise by winning her first start, and then went on to finish a fair third in the grade I Frizette Stakes. She was also entered in the Breeders' Cup Juvenile Fillies at the end of her first season, but she finished fifth.

At three she started off with a wide margin (9 lengths) win in the Grade III Honeybee Stakes. A month later she would repeat this convincing performance in the Grade II Fantasy Stakes. Joyful Victory was also entered in the Kentucky Oaks a pulled a fourth place. Her form would return somewhat with a second in the Mother Goose Stakes, but she finished fifth in the Coaching Club American Oaks. She was then laid off for the rest of the season.

At four her first start was an Optional Claiming in which she placed second, she got a late start and was pushed wide and came up just half a length short. She was stepped up by her trainer to a listed race and won the Tiffany Lass Stakes by dueling another stakes winner. With that solid win, she moved back up into the graded ranks with a third-place finish in the grade III Azeri Stakes, With a second places in the grade III Gardenia Stakes, grade I Zenyatta Stakes, and the grade II Chilukki Stakes; she would finish her four year old campaign with a third in the grade II Falls City Handicap.

At five she would achieve her best season. Her first race was a track record setting victory in the Houston Ladies Classic, which carried over into the grade I Santa Margarita Stakes, and the grade II Molly Pitcher Stakes, and she conclude her career with a third place in the grade I Zenyatta Stakes.

== Retirement ==
Ending her career sound, she would be entered into the 2013 Fasig-Tipton mixed sale. Joyful Victory was purchased as broodmare prospect for $2,000,000 by Aaron and Marie Jones. She was bred to Distorted Humor to produce a 2015 filly, and in 2016 she had another filly, by Medaglia d'Oro. Her most recent foal is a 2017 colt by the Triple Crown winner, American Pharoah. Her first filly will be old enough to run in 2018.
