= Turbulent Descent =

American Thoroughbred racehorse

- Breed: Thoroughbred
- Sire: Congrats
- Grandsire: A.P. Indy
- Dam: Roger's Sue
- Damsire: Forestry
- Sex: Mare
- Foaled: 2008
- Country: United States
- Colour: Bay
- Breeder: Ocala Stud
- Owner: Blinkers On Racing Stable (through June 2012); Michael Tabor, Susan Magnier, Derrick Smith
- Trainer: Mike Puype (2010–2011); Todd Pletcher (2012)
- Record: 14:8:2:0
- Earnings: $1,211,640

Major wins
- Hollywood Starlet Stakes (2010); Moccasin Stakes (2010); Santa Anita Oaks (2011); Test Stakes (2011); Ballerina Stakes (2012)

Turbulent Descent (foaled March 25, 2008 in Ocala, Florida) is a retired American Thoroughbred racehorse. She established herself as a premier sprinter with Grade I wins at ages 2, 3, and 4. Turbulent Descent was the winner of more than $1.2 million in graded stakes race earnings over a three year racing career and holds the stakes record in the Santa Anita Oaks. In retirement, she has been successful as a broodmare producing a Group III winning colt, Spanish Steps, by Galileo.

== Background ==
Turbulent Descent was bred in Florida and is the winningest daughter of champion sire Congrats. She was purchased by syndicate owner Blinkers On Racing Stable for $160,000 at the April 2010 Ocala Breeders Sale with the intention to base her in California under trainer Mike Puype. She injured her ankle during the flight to California after the plane encountered significant turbulence. The incident pushed training back by several months and served as inspiration for her name.

== Racing career ==
=== 2010: two-year-old season ===
Turbulent Descent made her debut at Hollywood Park on October 3, 2010 in a 6 furlong maiden special weight. After stalking the pace in fourth, she moved up to challenge the leaders at the quarter pole and faced little opposition. Hand ridden, she beat Canadian Pride by 1/2 length. She then made her stakes debut in the Moccasin Stakes on November 21. Under a hand ride again, she won by a length as the 3/5 favorite. This marked the first meeting between Turbulent Descent and Zazu, owned by Jerry Moss. She then capped off her year with a win in the Grade 1 Hollywood Starlet Stakes to remain unbeaten.

== Pedigree ==
Pedigree of Turbulent Descent(USA)
Sire Congrats (USA) b. 2000	A.P. Indy (USA) dk.b. 1989	Seattle Slew (USA)	Bold Reasoning (USA)
Sire Congrats (USA) b. 2000	A.P. Indy (USA) dk.b. 1989	Seattle Slew (USA)	My Charmer (USA)
Sire Congrats (USA) b. 2000	A.P. Indy (USA) dk.b. 1989	Weekend Surprise (USA)	Secretariat (USA)
Sire Congrats (USA) b. 2000	A.P. Indy (USA) dk.b. 1989	Weekend Surprise (USA)	Lassie Dear (USA)
Sire Congrats (USA) b. 2000	Praise (USA) b. 1994	Mr. Prospector (USA)	Raise a Native (USA)
Sire Congrats (USA) b. 2000	Praise (USA) b. 1994	Mr. Prospector (USA)	Gold Digger (USA)
Sire Congrats (USA) b. 2000	Praise (USA) b. 1994	Wild Applause (USA)	Northern Dancer (USA)
Sire Congrats (USA) b. 2000	Praise (USA) b. 1994	Wild Applause (USA)	Glowing Tribute (USA)
Dam Roger's Sue (SA) b. 2001	Forestry (USA) b. 1996	Storm Cat (USA)	Storm Bird (CAN)
Dam Roger's Sue (SA) b. 2001	Forestry (USA) b. 1996	Storm Cat (USA)	Terlingua (USA)
Dam Roger's Sue (SA) b. 2001	Forestry (USA) b. 1996	Shared Interest (USA)	Pleasant Colony (USA)
Dam Roger's Sue (SA) b. 2001	Forestry (USA) b. 1996	Shared Interest (USA)	Surgery (USA)
Dam Roger's Sue (SA) b. 2001	Fabulous (USA) ch. 1995	Seeking the Gold (USA)	Mr. Prospector (USA)
Dam Roger's Sue (SA) b. 2001	Fabulous (USA) ch. 1995	Seeking the Gold (USA)	Con Game (USA)
Dam Roger's Sue (SA) b. 2001	Fabulous (USA) ch. 1995	Gorgeous (USA)	Slew o' Gold (USA)
Dam Roger's Sue (SA) b. 2001	Fabulous (USA) ch. 1995	Gorgeous (USA)	Kamar (CAN)
