= Politely =

American-bred Thoroughbred racehorse

- Sire: Amerigo
- Grandsire: Nearco
- Dam: Morn Again
- Damsire: Sun Again
- Sex: Filly
- Foaled: 1963
- Country: United States
- Colour: Chestnut
- Breeder: Allaire du Pont
- Owner: Bohemia Stable
- Trainer: George M. Baker
- Record: 49- 21-9-5
- Earnings: US$552,972

Major wins
- Firenze Handicap (1967, 1968); Matchmaker Stakes (1967, 1968); Molly Pitcher Handicap (1967, 1968); Maskette Handicap (1967); New York Handicap (1967); Delaware Handicap (1968); Vineland Handicap (1968); Ladies Handicap (1968); Sheepshead Bay Handicap (1968)

Honours
- Aiken Thoroughbred Racing Hall of Fame (1977); Maryland Thoroughbred Hall of Fame (2013)
- Last updated on April 23, 2010

Politely (foaled 1963 in Maryland) was an American Thoroughbred racehorse. She was bred by Allaire du Pont and raced under her Bohemia Stable banner. Her sire, Amerigo, a son of the great Nearco, was a stakes winner of races in England and the United States including the Coventry Stakes, New York Handicap and the San Juan Capistrano Handicap. Her dam was Morn Again, a daughter of Calumet Farm's multiple stakes winner Sun Again.

When Politely, trained by George Baker, raced at age three, her best outing was a third to 1965 American Horse of the Year Moccasin in the 1966 Test Stakes. At ages four and five, she was one of the top fillies in the United States, scoring back-to-back wins in three important stakes races, which included equalling and breaking the Monmouth Park track record in the Matchmaker Stakes.

Retired to broodmare duty, Politely produced eleven foals between 1971 and 1987. She was bred to top stallions such as Hoist The Flag, Dr. Fager, Alydar, The Minstrel, Smarten and Northern Dancer, but her offspring met with limited racing success.

In 1977 Politely was inducted into the Aiken Thoroughbred Racing Hall of Fame and into the Maryland Thoroughbred Hall of Fame in 2013.
