= 2005 Dubai World Cup =

10th Dubai World Cup
- Dubai World Cup
- Location: Nad Al Sheba
- Date: 26 March 2005
- Winning horse: Roses In May (USA)
- Jockey: John R. Velazquez
- Trainer: Dale Romans (USA)
- Owner: Kenneth & Sarah Ramsey

The 2005 Dubai World Cup was a horse race held at Nad Al Sheba Racecourse on Saturday 26 March 2005. It was the 10th running of the Dubai World Cup.

The winner was Kenneth & Sarah Ramsey's Roses In May, a five-year-old brown horse trained in the United States by Dale Romans and ridden by John R. Velazquez. Roses In May's victory was the first in the race for his owner, trainer and jockey.

Roses In May had been one of the leading dirt performers in the United States in 2004 when he won the Whitney Stakes and finished second to Ghostzapper in the Breeders' Cup Classic. Before being shipped to Dubai he finished second to Saint Liam in the Donn Handicap in February. In the 2005 Dubai World Cup he started the 11/8 favourite and won by three lengths from his fellow American challenger Dynever, with Choctaw Nation one and a quarter lengths back in third. The Richard Mandella-trained second favourite Congrats finished fifth of the twelve runners.

== Race details ==
- Sponsor: Emirates
- Purse: £3,125,000; First prize: £1,875,000
- Surface: Dirt
- Going: Fast
- Distance: 10 furlongs
- Number of runners: 12
- Winner's time: 2:02.17

== Full result ==
Pos.	Marg.	Horse (bred)	Age	Jockey	Trainer (Country)	Odds
1		Roses In May (USA)	5	John R. Velazquez	Dale Romans (USA)	11/8 fav
2	3	Dynever (USA)	5	José A. Santos	Christophe Clement (USA)	16/1
3	1¼	Choctaw Nation (USA)	5	Victor Espinoza	Jeff Mullins (KSA)	14/1
4	4¾	Jack Sullivan (USA)	4	Darryll Holland	Gerard Butler (GB)	12/1
5	3¼	Congrats (USA)	5	Tyler Baze	Richard Mandella (USA)	9/2
6	2	Adjudi Mitsuo (JPN)	4	Hiroyuki Uchida	Masayuki Kawashima (JPN)	16/1
7	3¾	Lundy's Liability (BRZ)	5	Pat Valenzuela	Robert J. Frankel (USA)	7/1
8	nk	King's Boy** (GER)	8	Aaron Gryder	Jerry Barton (KSA)	66/1
9	2½	Yard-Arm (SAF)	6	Weichong Marwing	Mike de Kock (SAF)	12/1
10	8	Ruler's Court (USA)	4	Kerrin McEvoy	Ismail Mohammed (UAE)	40/1
11	2¼	Chiquitin (ARG)	5	Mick Kinane	Jerry Barton (KSA)	8/1
12	¾	Elmustanser (GB)	4	Richard Hills	Doug Watson (UAE)	25/1

- Abbreviations: DSQ = disqualified; nse = nose; nk = neck; shd = head; hd = head
- King's Boy also raced under the name Qaayed Alkhail

== Winner's details ==
Further details of the winner, Roses In May

- Sex: Stallion
- Foaled: 9 February 2000
- Country: United States
- Sire: Devil His Due; Dam: Tell A Secret (Speak John)
- Owner: Kenneth & Sarah Ramsey
- Breeder: Margaux Farm
