= Country Star =

American-bred Thoroughbred racehorse

- Sire: Empire Maker
- Grandsire: Unbridled
- Dam: Rings A Chime
- Damsire: Metfield
- Sex: Filly
- Foaled: 2005
- Country: United States
- Colour: Dark Bay
- Breeder: Stonerside Stable
- Owner: Stonerside Stable
- Trainer: Robert J. Frankel
- Record: 3: 2-1-0
- Earnings: $575,900

Major wins
- Alcibiades Stakes (2007); Hollywood Starlet Stakes (2007)

Country Star (foaled February 7, 2005 in Kentucky) is an American Thoroughbred racehorse. Owned and bred by Robert and Janice McNair's Stonerside Stable in Paris, Kentucky, the filly was sired by the 2003 Belmont Stakes winner, Empire Maker. Her dam is Rings A Chime, a daughter of Metfield who was a son of the 1977 U.S. Triple Crown winner, Seattle Slew.

Conditioned for racing by Hall of Fame trainer Bobby Frankel, Country Star made her racing debut in a turf race at New York's Belmont Park on September 20, 2007. After a poor start in which she fell well back of the leaders, she came on at the end with a strong rally to finish in second place. Believing in her potential, three weeks later her handlers entered the filly in the Grade I Alcibiades Stakes, a race on synthetic dirt at Keeneland Race Course in Kentucky. Ridden by regular jockey Rafael Bejarano, in the ten-horse field Country Star ran well back in seventh place for most of the race but as the field turned for home she came on with a powerful stretch drive to win by a full-length.

Bypassing the Breeders' Cup Juvenile Fillies, on December 15 Country Star won her second straight Grade 1 race of 2007 in very impressive fashion, capturing the Hollywood Starlet Stakes by 2¾ lengths and doing it in track record time.

Expected to compete in California to start her three-year-old campaign, depending on her winter/spring performances Country Star may be headed for either the 2008 Kentucky Oaks or the Kentucky Derby.
