= Desi Arnaz Stakes =

Horse race in Del Mar, California, US

- Class: Ungraded stakes
- Location: Del Mar Racetrack, Del Mar, California, United States
- Inaugurated: 1984
- Race type: Thoroughbred - Flat racing

Race information
- Distance: 6.5 furlongs
- Surface: Dirt
- Track: left-handed
- Qualification: Two-year-olds
- Purse: $100,000

The Desi Arnaz Stakes is an American Thoroughbred horse race run at Del Mar Racetrack in Del Mar, California. It was named in honor of the actor, musician, bandleader, comedian and producer, Desi Arnaz. It was originally run as the Moccasin Stakes at Hollywood Park Racetrack in Inglewood, California to honor Moccasin, the only two-year-old filly to be named American Horse of the Year. From 1995 through 1997 the race was run as the Maker's Mark Stakes then reverted to the Moccasin Stakes through 2013. Ownership of the race name was acquired at the end of 2013 when Hollywood Park ceased operations. It was first run at Del Mar in 2014 as the Desi Arnaz Stakes.

Always a race on dirt for two-year-old fillies, the ungraded event is set for the fall of each year. It is currently contested over a distance of six and one-half furlongs and currently offers a purse of $100,000.

== Records ==
Speed record:

- 1:16.20 @ current 6 1/2 furlongs: Ifyoucouldseemenow (1990)
- 1:21.38 @ 7 furlongs: Spring Awakening (2007)

Most wins by a jockey:

- 3 - Alex Solis (1991, 1996, 1999)
- 3 - Drayden Van Dyke (2014, 2017, 2018)
- 3 - Mike E. Smith (2001, 2002, 2020)

Most wins by a trainer:

- 6 - Bob Baffert (2003, 2004, 2017, 2018, 2021, 2023)

Most wins by an owner:

- 2 - Jan, Mace & Samantha Siegel (1990, 1994)

== Winners ==
Year	Winner	Age	Jockey	Trainer	Owner	Dist. (furlongs)	Time	Win$
2024	Practical Dream	2	Antonio Fresu	Tim Yakteen	Amestoy, Leslie A., Amestoy, Jr., Pierre Jean and Beasley, Roger K	7 f	1:24.47	$60,000
2023	Nothing Like You	2	Juan J. Hernandez	Bob Baffert	Hunt, Georgia Antley, Giglio, Jeff and Rogitz, John L	7 f	1:23.03	$60,000
2022	Justique	2	Victor Espinoza	John Shirreffs	C R K Stable	7 f	1:23.41	$60,000
2021	Eda	2	Flavien Prat	Bob Baffert	Baoma Corporation	7 f	1:23.41	$60,000
2020	Astute	2	Mike E. Smith	Richard E. Mandella	LNJ Foxwoods	6.5 f	1:17.28	$60,000
2019	Leucothea	2	Abel Cedillo	Peter L. Miller	Altamira Racing Stable, SoCal Racing, Brian McGoldrick	6.5 f	1:17.42	$60,000
2018	Chasing Yesterday	2	Drayden Van Dyke	Bob Baffert	Summer Wind Equine (Laura Jane Lyon)	7 f	1:23.81	$60,000
2017	Dream Tree	2	Drayden Van Dyke	Bob Baffert	Phoenix Thoroughbred III (Amer Abdulaziz)	7 f	1:23.69	$60,000
2016	Race not held							
2015	Lucky Folie	2	Gary Stevens	Richard E. Mandella	Alain & Gérard Wertheimer	7 f	1:23.86	$60,000
2014	Achiever's Legacy	2	Drayden Van Dyke	Jerry Hollendorfer	Gillian Campbell, Margaret Cellucci, Dan Horowitz, Richard Robertson	7 f	1:23.25	$60,000
2013	Bajan	2	Victor Espinoza	Simon Callaghan	Eclipse Thoroughbred Partners (Aron Wellman, manager) & Ronald Frankel	7 f	1:24.26	$60,000
2012	Race not held							
2011	Made To Love Her	2	Rafael Bejarano	James M. Kasparoff	Copper Penny Stables (Alina Muther)	7 f	1:23.88	$60,000
2010	Turbulent Descent	2	David Flores	Michael T. Puype	Blinkers On Racing (partnership), David Aurelio, Robert Butler, Joleen Coons	7 f	1:23.15	$60,000
2009	Bickersons	2	Joe Talamo	Kelly J. Breen	George & Lori Hall	7 f	1:22.49	$60,000
2008	Evita Argentina	2	Tyler Baze	John W. Sadler	Halo Farms (Theodore Aroney) & Three Sisters Thoroughbred	7 f	1:21.50	$71,100
2007	Spring Awakening	2	Garrett Gomez	Michael R. Mitchell	Gerald Frankel, Robert & Coit Strauss	7 f	1:21.38	$68,100
2006	Quick Little Miss	2	Jon Court	Melvin F. Stute	Daniel Q. Schiffer, Annabelle Stute, The Hat Ranch West (Schiffer family)	7 f	1:24.13	$60,000
2005	Private World	2	Kent Desormeaux	Robert B. Hess Jr.	Thoroughbred Capital Partners	7 f	1:22.39	$60,000
2004	No Bull Baby	2	Tyler Baze	Bob Baffert	Hal & Patti Earnhardt III	7 f	1:23.06	$60,000
2003	Victory U.S.A.	2	Julie Krone	Bob Baffert	Thomas F. Van Meter II	7 f	1:22.50	$60,000
2002	Puxa Saco	2	Mike E. Smith	Jenine Sahadi	Richard Rowan	7 f	1:21.80	$60,000
2001	Ayanna	2	Mike E. Smith	R. Kory Owens	Triple AAA Ranch (Richard Owens)	7 f	1:23.40	$60,000
2000	Jetin Excess	2	Victor Espinoza	Alcides "Pico" Perdomo	Earle Malley, Pico Perdomo, Tim Saltonstall, et al.	7 f	1:23.60	$60,000
1999	Classic Olympio	2	Alex Solis	VHW Stables	Ronald McAnally	7 f	1:22.20	$60,000
1998	Perfect Six	2	David Flores	William J. Morey Jr.	Carole & Don Chaiken, Bart & Ronelle Heller	7 f	1:23.00	$43,350
1997	Superlative	2	Chris McCarron	Ronald McAnally	VHW Stables	7 f	1:22.60	$60,000
1996	High Heeled Hope	2	Alex Solis	Randy K. Bradshaw	Paraneck Stable	7 f	1:22.80	$63,000
1995	Advancing Star	2	Gary Stevens	Richard E. Mandella	Golden Eagle Farm	7 f	1:21.80	$61,000
1994	Urbane	2	Corey Black	Brian A. Mayberry	Jan, Mace & Samantha Siegel	7 f	1:21.60	$44,150
1993	Race not held							
1992	Blue Moonlight	2	Eddie Delahoussaye	Brian A. Mayberry	Mary Zuckerman	7 f	1:22.80	$57,000
1991	Melo Melody	2	Alex Solis	Darrell Vienna	William J. Herrick	7 f	1:23.00	$58,800
1990	Ifyoucouldseemenow	2	Martin Pedroza	Brian A. Mayberry	Jan, Mace & Samantha Siegel	6.5 f	1:16.20	$61,750
1989	Owiseone	2	Gary Boulanger	Terry R. Knight	Dame Construction Co. Inc.	6.5 f	1:16.60	$43,950
1988	Hot Novel	2	Eddie Delahoussaye	Fabio Nor	Joanne H. Nor	6.5 f	1:16.60	$54,100
1987	Variety Baby	2	Laffit Pincay Jr.	Bruce Headley	Kjell Qvale	6.5 f	1:16.80	$38,300
1985	1986	Race not held						
1984	Lady's Secret	2	Chris McCarron	D. Wayne Lukas	Eugene & Joyce Klein	6 f	1:11.20	$34,200
