= Serena's Song =

American Thoroughbred racehorse (1992–2026)

Serena’s Song
- Sire: Rahy
- Grandsire: Blushing Groom
- Dam: Imagining
- Damsire: Northfields
- Sex: Mare
- Foaled: April 4, 1992
- Died: March 11, 2026 (aged 33)
- Country: United States
- Colour: Bay
- Breeder: Howard J. Baker
- Owner: Robert and Beverly Lewis
- Trainer: D. Wayne Lukas
- Record: 38: 18-11–3
- Earnings: $3,283,388

Major wins
- Oak Leaf Stakes (1994); Hollywood Starlet Stakes (1994); Landaluce Stakes (1994); Las Virgenes Stakes (1995); Jim Beam Stakes (1995); Santa Ynez Stakes (1995); Gazelle Handicap (1995); Santa Anita Oaks (1995); Mother Goose Stakes (1995); Black-Eyed Susan Stakes (1995); Haskell Invitational Handicap (1995); Beldame Stakes (1995); Hempstead Handicap (1996); Fleur De Lis Handicap (1996); Santa Maria Handicap (1996); Santa Monica Handicap (1996); Pimlico Distaff (1996)

Awards
- Kentucky-bred Three-Year-Old Filly (1995); Kentucky-bred Horse of the Year (1995); Kentucky-bred Handicap Mare (1996); American Champion Three-Year-Old Filly (1995)

Honours
- U.S. Racing Hall of Fame (2002)
- Last updated on January 1, 2008

Serena's Song (April 4, 1992 – March 11, 2026) was an American Thoroughbred racehorse. She won 17 graded stakes races, including 11 Grade I (some against males and older mares), in three seasons for $3,286,388 in earnings.

== Background ==
Serena's Song was a smaller than average, but athletically built bay mare. Her sire Rahy was a Grade II winner on turf and Grade I-placed, but was more successful at stud and became notable primarily as a sire of broodmares and racemares. Rahy has also sired 2006 U.S. Champion Two-Year-Old Filly Dreaming of Anna, Breeders' Cup Turf winner and European Horse of the Year Fantastic Light, and the outstanding broodmare Mariah's Storm, among other notable horses. Serena's Song's dam Imagining, a daughter of Northfields, won two of her 26 races but became a successful broodmare who also produced Grade III winner Vivid Imagination and graded stakes producers River Saint and Serena's Sister.

Serena's Song was bred in Kentucky by Howard J. Baker. Hall of Fame trainer D. Wayne Lukas bought her at the 1993 Keeneland July yearling sale for $150,000 for Eclipse of Merit owners Robert and Beverly Lewis.

== Racing career ==
=== 1994: Two-Year-Old Season ===
In her two-year-old season, Serena's Song started 10 times and won four races. She also finished second twice and third once while compiling earnings of $597,335. In the Breeders' Cup Juvenile Fillies, she finished second to the undefeated champion Flanders by a head. In the Grade I Hollywood Starlet Stakes, she beat Urbane.

=== 1995: Three-Year-Old Season ===
In 13 starts at age three, Serena's Song won 9. One of her top performances was in the second jewel of the Fillies Triple Crown, the $200,000 Grade 2 Black-Eyed Susan Stakes. That race was run on May 19, 1995, over a mile and one eighth at Pimlico Race Course. Serena's Song beat a field of seven stakes winners, including Conquistadoress and Rare Opportunity.

Serena's Song defeated males that year in the Spiral Stakes and the Haskell Stakes. She also defeated older females in the Beldame Stakes.

She then won the American Champion Three-Year-Old Filly award, winning $1,524,920.

=== 1996: Four-Year-Old Season ===
Serena's Song raced 15 times as a four-year-old and won 5, never coming worse than third, while running at eight different tracks. In May she won the Pimlico Distaff, now called the Allaire duPont Distaff Stakes, on the Preakness Stakes undercard. She also came very close to winning the Whitney Handicap over males, and was second in the Breeders' Cup Distaff to bring her year's earnings to $1,164,133.

== Retirement and breeding career ==
Serena's Song was sent to Denali Stud near Paris, Kentucky to become a broodmare. She produced 12 foals, 11 that raced, and nine who have won. Among her offspring are:

- Serena's Tune – 1998 bay filly by Mr. Prospector – winner of 7 of her 14 starts, including three stakes victories, with career earnings of $337,260. She is the dam of Vocalised (by Vindication), a Group 3 winner in Great Britain and Ireland. Serena's Tune also produced Serena's Cat, an ungraded stakes winner who produced 2015 American Champion Older Dirt Male Horse Honor Code and Grade 2 winner Noble Tune. Serena's Tune died in 2006.
- Sophisticat – 1999 bay filly by Storm Cat – won 3 races in England, France, and Ireland, including the Coronation Stakes. She is the dam of Grade 3 placed Sefroua by Kingmambo, and Grade 1 placed Pursuit of Glory.
- Arbitrate – 2000 chestnut colt by Deputy Minister – 5 wins in 33 starts, with stakes placings. He earned $195,390, and is now a stallion in Mexico.
- Grand Reward – 2001 bay colt by Storm Cat – 4 wins in North America, England, and Ireland, including the Grade 2 Oaklawn Handicap. He has earnings of $545,844, and entered stud at Hill 'n' Dale in Kentucky, later moving to Ghost Ridge Farm in Felton, Pennsylvania. As of 2018 he is standing at Haras La Quebrada in Argentina.
- Harlington – 2002 bay colt by Unbridled – 6 wins in North America including the Grade 2 Gulfstream Park Handicap, and earnings of $370,000. He entered stud at Hill 'N' Dale Farm in 2009, and now stands at stud Saudi Arabia.
- Pure Symmetry – 2003 chestnut filly by Storm Cat – non winner but placed 2 times in 6 races. She produced the stakes winner High Stakes Player by A.P. Indy and stakes runner Miner's Cat by Mineshaft. She also produced Divine Energy by Tapit, who is now a stallion in Mexico.
- Colourful Score – 2004 Bay Horse by Storm Cat – 1 win in 3 starts, won by 7 lengths in the UAE.
- Spark Candle – 2005 Chestnut Horse by A.P. Indy – 9 wins in 22 starts. Raced in USA and Japan, $262,303
- Schramsberg – 2006 Chestnut Horse by Storm Cat – 6 wins at 4 and 5, 2011, $394,626, won Gr.III John B. Connally. Entered stud 2012 at Bar None Farm in Canada. Sire of 2017 Canadian Juvenile Stakes winner Remarkable Vintage.
- Stormberg – 2008 Chestnut Colt by Storm Cat – Winner in 7 starts. Entered stud at NexStar Ranch in California in 2015, and moved to Tommy Town Thoroughbreds in 2018.
- Night and Day – 2009 Bay Filly by Unbridled's Song – Ran once as a 2 year old, was unplaced. Dam of graded stakes winner Made You Look.
- Serene Melody – 2010 Bay Filly by Street Cry (Ire) – Winner of the Wintergreen Stakes at Turfway Park- Retired, broodmare.
- UNNAMED – 2011 Bay Filly by Medaglia d'Oro – Died as a foal.
- Gold Serenade – 2014 filly by Medaglia d'Oro – Winless in 6 starts. She has retired and resided at Denali Stud.

After her 2014 filly was weaned, Serena's Song was retired from broodmare duties. She still resided at Denali Stud.

Serena's Song was inducted into the Hall of Fame in 2002 at age ten.

== Death ==
Serena's Song died on March 11, 2026, at the age of 33.

== Pedigree ==
Pedigree of Serena's Song (USA), bay mare, 1992
Sire Rahy 1985	Blushing Groom; 1974	Red God	Nasrullah
Sire Rahy 1985	Blushing Groom; 1974	Red God	Spring Run
Sire Rahy 1985	Blushing Groom; 1974	Runaway Bride	Wild Risk
Sire Rahy 1985	Blushing Groom; 1974	Runaway Bride	Aimee
Sire Rahy 1985	Glorious Song; 1976	Halo	Hail to Reason
Sire Rahy 1985	Glorious Song; 1976	Halo	Cosmah
Sire Rahy 1985	Glorious Song; 1976	Ballade	Herbager
Sire Rahy 1985	Glorious Song; 1976	Ballade	Miss Swapsco
Dam Imagining 1983	Northfields; 1968	Northern Dancer	Nearctic
Dam Imagining 1983	Northfields; 1968	Northern Dancer	Natalma
Dam Imagining 1983	Northfields; 1968	Little Hut	Occupy
Dam Imagining 1983	Northfields; 1968	Little Hut	Savage Beauty
Dam Imagining 1983	Image Intensifier; 1971	Dancer's Image	Native Dancer
Dam Imagining 1983	Image Intensifier; 1971	Dancer's Image	Noors Image
Dam Imagining 1983	Image Intensifier; 1971	Pat's Irish	Tudor Minstrel
Dam Imagining 1983	Image Intensifier; 1971	Pat's Irish	Snow Shower (Family: 7)

== See also ==
- List of leading Thoroughbred racehorses
