= Allaire duPont Stakes =

- Class: Listed
- Location: Pimlico Race Course, Baltimore, Maryland, United States
- Inaugurated: 1992 (as Pimlico Distaff Handicap)
- Race type: Thoroughbred – Flat racing
- Website: www.pimlico.com

Race information
- Distance: 1 1/8 miles (9 furlongs)
- Surface: Dirt
- Track: left-handed
- Qualification: Fillies and mares, three-years-old and older
- Weight: Base weights with allowances: 4-year-olds and up: 126 lbs. 3-year-olds: 120 lbs.
- Purse: $100,000 (since 2023)

The Allaire DuPont Stakes is a Listed American Thoroughbred horse race for fillies and mares age three and older over a distance of 1 1/8 miles (9 furlongs) run annually in mid May at Pimlico Race Course in Baltimore, Maryland.

== History ==
=== Race name ===
Originally when inaugurated on 20 June 1992 the event was known as the Pimlico Distaff Handicap. In 2002 the event was renamed to the Pimlico Breeders' Cup Distaff Handicap and again renamed in 2006 in honor of the late Maryland horsewoman and owner of the great Kelso, Allaire duPont to the Allaire duPont Breeders' Cup Distaff Stakes. In 2008 the Breeders' Cup sponsorship ceased and the name of the race reflected the change. In 2020 the event was run as the Allaire duPont Stakes.

=== Grade ===
The race was first awarded graded status in 1994 and then the race was upgraded from a Grade III to a Grade II event in 2007. The race was downgraded in 2011 to a Grade III event. In 2023 the event was downgraded to a Listed event.

=== Distance ===
From 1992 through 2001, the race was contested at 1 1/8 miles and was shortened to 1 1/16 miles until 2014. In 2016 the distance was increased back to 1 1/8 miles.

=== Schedule ===
The inaugural running of the event was run in late June. In 1993 and 1994 the event was scheduled in May. Then it was moved to the Preakness undercard beginning in 1995 and currently it is held on Black-Eyed Susan Stakes day. In 2010 and 2014 the race was put on hiatus. Due to the COVID-19 pandemic in the United States the Preakness Carnival was moved to October but this event was not scheduled until late December at Laurel Park.

== Records ==
Speed record:

- 1 1/8 miles: 1:47.64 – Mylady Curlin (2019)
- 1 1/16 miles: 1:42.43 – Buy The Barrell (2008)

Margins:

- 7 1/2 lengths – Terra Promessa (2017)

Most wins by a horse:

- 2 – Stoneway Farm (2016, 2018)

Most wins by a jockey:

- 4 – John R. Velazquez (2002, 2013, 2015, 2021)

Most wins by a trainer:

- 6 – Todd A. Pletcher (2006, 2011, 2015, 2021, 2025, 2026)

Most wins by an owner:

- 2 – Stoneway Farm (2016, 2018)

== Winners ==
| Year | Winner | Age | Jockey | Trainer | Owner | Distance | Time | Purse | Grade | Ref |
|---|---|---|---|---|---|---|---|---|---|---|
At Laurel Park – Allaire duPont Distaff Stakes
| 2026 | Margie’s Intention | 4 | Irad Ortiz Jr. | Todd A. Pletcher | Delta Squad Racing, Michael Dubb & Madaket Stables | 1 1/8 miles | 1:52.26 | $123,750 | Listed | |
At Pimlico
| 2025 | Candied | 4 | Irad Ortiz Jr. | Todd A. Pletcher | Eclipse Thoroughbred Partners & Bobby Flay | 1 1/8 miles | 1:50.47 | $125,000 | Listed | |
| 2024 | Shotgun Hottie | 5 | Paco Lopez | Cherie DeVaux | Omar Aldabbagh & Jeff Ganje | 1 1/8 miles | 1:49.60 | $100,000 | Listed | |
| 2023 | Interstatedaydream | 4 | Florent Geroux | Brad H. Cox | Flurry Racing Stables | 1 1/8 miles | 1:49.32 | $100,000 | Listed | |
| 2022 | Super Quick | 4 | Florent Geroux | Norm W. Casse | Marylou Whitney Stables | 1 1/8 miles | 1:47.78 | $148,500 | III | |
| 2021 | Spice Is Nice | 4 | John R. Velazquez | Todd A. Pletcher | Lawana & Robert Low | 1 1/8 miles | 1:48.71 | $142,500 | III | |
At Laurel Park
| 2020 | Eres Tu | 4 | Jevian Toledo | Arnaud Delacour | Edward A. Seltzer & Beverly S. Anderson | 1 1/8 miles | 1:50.57 | $150,000 | III | |
At Pimlico – Allaire duPont Distaff Stakes
| 2019 | Mylady Curlin | 4 | Luis Saez | Brad H. Cox | Sather Family | 1 1/8 miles | 1:47.64 | $150,000 | III | |
| 2018 | Song of Spring | 4 | Ricardo Santana Jr. | Neil J. Howard | Stoneway Farm | 1 1/8 miles | 1:51.10 | $150,000 | III | |
| 2017 | Terra Promessa | 4 | Jose L. Ortiz | Steven M. Asmussen | Stonestreet Stables | 1 1/8 miles | 1:49.12 | $150,000 | III | |
| 2016 | Ahh Chocolate | 4 | Brian Hernandez Jr. | Neil J. Howard | Stoneway Farm | 1 1/8 miles | 1:50.82 | $150,000 | III | |
| 2015 | Stopchargingmaria | 4 | John R. Velazquez | Todd A. Pletcher | Repole Stable | 1 1/8 miles | 1:50.38 | $150,000 | III | |
| 2014 | Race not held | | | | | | | | | |
| 2013 | Summer Applause | 4 | John R. Velazquez | Chad C. Brown | Greenwood Lodge Farm, Gillian S. Campbell, Dan Clark & Greg Skoda | 1 1/16 miles | 1:46.54 | $148,500 | III | |
| 2012 | Awesomemundo | 4 | Mike E. Smith | Bob Baffert | Natalie J. Baffert | 1 1/16 miles | 1:44.70 | $100,000 | III | |
| 2011 | Super Espresso | 4 | Ramon A. Dominguez | Todd A. Pletcher | Bobby Flay | 1 1/16 miles | 1:42.85 | $100,000 | III | |
| 2010 | Race not held | | | | | | | | | |
| 2009 | Skylighter | 4 | Julien R. Leparoux | Robert J. Frankel | Darley Stable | 1 1/16 miles | 1:44.34 | $150,000 | II | |
| 2008 | Buy the Barrel | 4 | Gabriel Saez | J. Larry Jones | Hinkle Farms | 1 1/16 miles | 1:42.43 | $150,000 | II | |
Allaire duPont Breeders' Cup Distaff Stakes
| 2007 | Rolling Sea | 4 | Garrett K. Gomez | Steven M. Asmussen | Millennium Farms | 1 1/16 miles | 1:42.88 | $134,000 | II | |
| 2006 | Pool Land | 4 | Garrett K. Gomez | Todd A. Pletcher | Melnyk Racing Stables | 1 1/16 miles | 1:42.71 | $200,000 | III | |
Pimlico Breeders' Cup Distaff Handicap
| 2005 | Silmaril | 4 | Ryan Fogelsonger | Christopher W. Grove | Stephen E. Quick & Christoper J. Feifarek | 1 1/16 miles | 1:44.87 | $107,400 | III | |
| 2004 | Friel's for Real | 4 | Abel Castellano Jr. | Edward T. Allard | Gilbert G. Campbell | 1 1/16 miles | 1:45.03 | $150,000 | III | |
| 2003 | Mandy's Gold | 5 | Jerry D. Bailey | Michael E. Gorham | Steeplechase Farm | 1 1/16 miles | 1:46.32 | $145,500 | III | |
| 2002 | Summer Colony | 4 | John R. Velazquez | Mark A. Hennig | Edward P. Evans | 1 1/16 miles | 1:42.90 | $148,500 | III | |
Pimlico Distaff Handicap
| 2001 | Serra Lake | 4 | Pat Day | Claude R. McGaughey III | Emory A. Hamilton | 1 1/8 miles | 1:50.22 | $200,000 | III | |
| 2000 | Roza Robata | 5 | Pat Day | Dale L. Romans | McKee Stables | 1 1/8 miles | 1:49.82 | $200,000 | III | |
| 1999 | Mil Kilates | 6 | Shane Sellers | Bobby C. Barnett | John A. Franks | 1 1/8 miles | 1:49.05 | $200,000 | III | |
| 1998 | Ajina | 4 | Jerry D. Bailey | William I. Mott | Allen E. Paulson | 1 1/8 miles | 1:48.70 | $200,000 | III | |
| 1997 | Rare Blend | 4 | Jerry D. Bailey | Claude R. McGaughey III | H. Joseph Allen | 1 1/8 miles | 1:51.51 | $200,000 | III | |
| 1996 | Serena's Song | 4 | Gary L. Stevens | D. Wayne Lukas | Robert & Beverly Lewis | 1 1/8 miles | 1:49.75 | $194,000 | III | |
| 1995 | Pennyhill Park (CAN) | 5 | Mike E. Smith | Roger L. Attfield | Rod Ferguson & Anderson Farms | 1 1/8 miles | 1:49.32 | $200,000 | III | |
| 1994 | Double Sixes | 4 | Edgar S. Prado | James W. Murphy | Hickory Tree Stable | 1 1/8 miles | 1:51.19 | $200,000 | III | |
| 1993 | Deputation | 4 | Chris Antley | Claude R. McGaughey III | Stuart S. Janney III | 1 1/8 miles | 1:49.12 | $200,000 | | |
| 1992 | Wilderness Song | 4 | Craig Perret | James E. Day | Sam-Son Farm | 1 1/8 miles | 1:49.06 | $250,000 | | |

== See also ==
- Allaire duPont Distaff Stakes top three finishers
- List of American and Canadian Graded races

== External sites ==
- Pimlico Race Course official website
