= Wilderness Song =

Canadian-bred Thoroughbred racehorse

- Sire: Wild Again
- Grandsire: Icecapade
- Dam: Nalee's Rhythm
- Damsire: Nalee's Man
- Sex: Filly
- Foaled: 1988
- Country: Canada
- Colour: Bay
- Breeder: Sam-Son Farm
- Owner: Sam-Son Farm
- Trainer: James E. Day
- Record: 37: 15-12-2
- Earnings: $1,482,005

Major wins
- Mazarine Breeders Cup Stakes (1990); Princess Elizabeth Stakes (1990); Fury Stakes (1991); Bison City Stakes (1991); Spinster Stakes (1991); Belle Mahone Stakes (1991); Pimlico Distaff Handicap (1992); Churchill Downs Distaff Handicap (1992); Molly Pitcher Breeders' Cup Handicap (1993); Monmouth Beach Stakes (1993)

Awards
- Canadian Horse Racing Hall of Fame (2008)

Wilderness Song (foaled 1988 in Ontario) is a retired Canadian Champion Thoroughbred racehorse and a Hall of Fame inductee. Out of the mare Nalee's Rhythm, she was sired by 1984 Breeders' Cup Classic winner Wild Again.

Bred and raced by Sam-Son Farm and trained by Jim Day, Wilderness Song lived under the shadow of her stablemate and fellow Hall of Fame filly Dance Smartly, to whom she finished second in the 1991 Canadian Oaks and the Queen's Plate. Her second-place finish at the Queen's Plate was also historic because of her passenger. Francine Villeneuve became both the first female jockey to finish "in the money" in a Canadian Triple Crown race and the first Canadian woman to ride in Canada's oldest race.

Wilderness Song won eight of her eighteen starts in Canada and made nineteen starts in the United States, where her seven wins included the Grade 1 Spinster Stakes at Keeneland Race Course. In 1992, Wilderness Song was voted the Sovereign Award for Champion Older Female Horse. She was retired to broodmare duty following the 1993 season.

In 2008, she was honored with induction into the Canadian Horse Racing Hall of Fame.

== Pedigree ==
Pedigree of Wilderness Song, bay filly, 1988
Sire Wild Again	Icecapade	Nearctic	Nearco
Sire Wild Again	Icecapade	Nearctic	Lady Angela
Sire Wild Again	Icecapade	Shenanigans	Native Dancer
Sire Wild Again	Icecapade	Shenanigans	Bold Irish
Sire Wild Again	Bushel-n-Peck	Khaled	Hyperion
Sire Wild Again	Bushel-n-Peck	Khaled	Eclair
Sire Wild Again	Bushel-n-Peck	Dama	Dante
Sire Wild Again	Bushel-n-Peck	Dama	Clovelly
Dam Nalee’s Rhythm	Nalees Man	Gallant Man	Migoli
Dam Nalee’s Rhythm	Nalees Man	Gallant Man	Majideh
Dam Nalee’s Rhythm	Nalees Man	Nalee	Nashua
Dam Nalee’s Rhythm	Nalees Man	Nalee	Levee
Dam Nalee’s Rhythm	Lady Rhythm	Mister Jive	Mr. Music
Dam Nalee’s Rhythm	Lady Rhythm	Mister Jive	Joy Forever
Dam Nalee’s Rhythm	Lady Rhythm	Miss Kansulin	Chop Chop
Dam Nalee’s Rhythm	Lady Rhythm	Miss Kansulin	Miss Wooler (family: 10-c)
