= Starlet Stakes =

- Class: Grade II
- Location: Los Alamitos Race Course in Cypress, California
- Inaugurated: 1979 (at Hollywood Park Racetrack)
- Race type: Thoroughbred - Flat racing
- Website: Los Alamitos

Race information
- Distance: 1 1/16 miles
- Surface: dirt
- Track: left-handed
- Qualification: Two-year-old fillies
- Weight: 120 lbs.
- Purse: $200,000 (since 2023)

The Starlet Stakes is a Grade II American Thoroughbred horse race for two-year-old fillies run over a distance of one and one sixteenth miles (8 1/2 furlongs) on the dirt held annually in early December at Los Alamitos Race Course in Cypress, California. The event currently offers a purse of $200,000.

== History ==
The inaugural running of the event was during the spring meeting of 1979, on 13 April at Hollywood Park Racetrack in Inglewood, California as a 6 furlong sprint for three-year-olds. The event was won by Eloquent who was ridden by the US Hall of Fame jockey Donald Pierce and trained by US Hall of Fame trainer Lazaro S. Barrera in a time of 1:09 flat.

The event was not run the following. In 1981 the administration of Hollywood Park Racetrack decided to hold two new two-year-old events at the end of the racing season with one for colts and geldings, Hollywood Futurity and for fillies the Hollywood Starlet Stakes. The races were held on consecutive weekends with the Hollywood Starlet Stakes run on 21 November while the Futurity was held on 28 November.

With high stakes that were offered for the race the event attracted many fine two-year-old fillies. Within two years, in 1983 the American Graded Stakes Committee classified the event with the highest grading of Grade I. That year the US Hall of Fame trainer D. Wayne Lukas saddled the first of eight victories in the event with Althea winning and US Hall of Fame jockey Laffit Pincay Jr. in the reins. Althea would be voted an Eclipse Award as the American Champion Two-Year-Old Filly for 1983.

In 1984 the Breeders' Cup was initiated and held at Hollywood Park, the winner by protest of the Breeders' Cup Juvenile Fillies, Outstandingly would three weeks later confirm her dominance with another win over Fran's Valentine to win the Hollywood Starlet and capture US Champion Two-Year-Old Filly honors.

In 1985 the distance of the event was decreased to one mile. After six runnings the distance was reverted back to a distance of 1 1/16 miles.

In 2003, Hollywood Story became the first maiden to win the Starlet in the history of the event.

In 2006 the event was run on a new synthetic Cushion Track which was installed at Hollywood Park.

With the closure of Hollywood Park Racetrack in 2013 the event was moved Los Alamitos Race Course and renamed to the Starlet Stakes.

The Starlet Stakes is the final major race of the year in California for young fillies, and is frequented by horses coming out of the Breeders' Cup Juvenile Fillies.

As a supplementary entry of $10,000 Abel Tasman started at 13-1 and won the event in 2016. The following year Abel Tasman had an excellent season winning three Grade I events including the Kentucky Oaks and was voted US Champion 3-Year-Old Filly.

In 2023 the event was downgraded by the Thoroughbred Owners and Breeders Association to Grade II status.

Trainer Bob Baffert has won the Starlet twelve times, more than any other conditioner. The Into Mischief filly Consequent won in 2025 to give Baffert his ninth consecutive win in the race.

== Records ==
Speed record:

- 1 1/16 miles (dirt): 1:41.82 - Splendid Blended (2004)
- 1 1/16 miles (synthetic): 1:40.54 - Country Star (2007)
- 1 mile: 1:35.00 – Stocks Up (1998)

Margins:

- 11 lengths – Love Lock (1997)

Most wins by an owner:

- 4 – Baoma Corporation/Baoma Corp (2019, 2020, 2021, 2024)

Most wins by a jockey:

- 4 – Corey Nakatani (1992, 1994, 1995, 1996)
- 4 – Drayden Van Dyke (2017, 2018, 2019, 2020)

Most wins by a trainer:

- 12 – Bob Baffert (1998, 2001, 2013, 2017, 2018, 2019, 2020, 2021, 2022, 2023, 2024, 2025)

== Winners ==
Year	Winner	Jockey	Trainer	Owner	Distance	Time	Purse	Grade	Ref
At Los Alamitos – Starlet Stakes
2025	Consequent	Kazushi Kimura	Bob Baffert	Juddmonte	1 1/16 miles	1:44.03	$200,000	II	
2024	Tenma	Juan J. Hernandez	Bob Baffert	Baoma Corp	1 1/16 miles	1:44.16	$200,500	II	
2023	Nothing Like You	Juan J. Hernandez	Bob Baffert	Georgia Antley Hunt, Jeff Giglio & John L. Rogitz	1 1/16 miles	1:44.78	$200,500	II	
2022	Faiza	Flavien Prat	Bob Baffert	Michael Lund Petersen	1 1/16 miles	1:44.49	$300,500	I	
2021	Eda	Juan J. Hernandez	Bob Baffert	Baoma Corporation	1 1/16 miles	1:44.51	$300,500	I	
2020	Varda	Drayden Van Dyke	Bob Baffert	Baoma Corporation	1 1/16 miles	1:44.53	$300,500	I	
2019	Bast	Drayden Van Dyke	Bob Baffert	Baoma Corporation	1 1/16 miles	1:43.36	$300,000	I	
2018	Chasing Yesterday	Drayden Van Dyke	Bob Baffert	Summer Wind Equine	1 1/16 miles	1:42.59	$300,345	I	
2017	Dream Tree	Drayden Van Dyke	Bob Baffert	Phoenix Thoroughbred III	1 1/16 miles	1:43.87	$294,000	I	
2016	Abel Tasman	Joseph Talamo	Simon Callaghan	Clearsky Farms	1 1/16 miles	1:42.25	$301,380	I	
2015	Street Fancy	Mike E. Smith	Philip D'Amato	Agave Racing Stable	1 1/16 miles	1:44.42	$301,000	I	
2014	Take Charge Brandi	Victor Espinoza	D. Wayne Lukas	Willis D. Horton	1 1/16 miles	1:42.18	$350,500	I	
At Hollywood Park – Hollywood Starlet Stakes
2013	Streaming	Martin Garcia	Bob Baffert	Hill 'n' Dale Equine Holdings & Edward McGhee	1 1/16 miles	1:44.96	$500,500	I	
2012	Pure Fun	Garrett K. Gomez	Kenneth G. McPeek	Magdalena Racing	1 1/16 miles	1:44.65	$500,000	I	
2011	Killer Graces	Joseph Talamo	Jerry Hollendorfer	Jerry Hollendorfer, Daniel Borislow, Gillian Campbell & Steve Melen	1 1/16 miles	1:44.09	$402,000	I	
2010	Turbulent Descent	David R. Flores	Mike Puype	Blinkers On Racing, Aurelio, Strauss, Butler, Coons, Lapso, et al	1 1/16 miles	1:44.18	$409,250	I	
2009	Blind Luck	Rafael Bejarano	Jerry Hollendorfer	Jerry Hollendorfer, Mark DeDomenico & John Carver	1 1/16 miles	1:41.96	$405,250	I	
2008	Laragh	Edgar S. Prado	John P. Terranova II	IEAH Stables, Gary Tolchin & Pegasus Holding Group Stables	1 1/16 miles	1:41.96	$438,500	I	
2007	Country Star	Rafael Bejarano	Robert J. Frankel	Stonerside Stable	1 1/16 miles	1:40.54	$425,500	I	
2006	Romance Is Diane	David R. Flores	Mike R. Mitchell	Senji Nishimura	1 1/16 miles	1:42.61	$459,250	I	
2005	Diplomat Lady	Tyler Baze	Christopher S. Paasch	Charles Cono	1 1/16 miles	1:43.89	$456,000	I	
2004	Splendid Blended	Kent J. Desormeaux	Neil D. Drysdale	Peter Vegso	1 1/16 miles	1:41.82	$389,000	I	
2003	Hollywood Story	Pat Valenzuela	John Shirreffs	George Krikorian	1 1/16 miles	1:42.87	$349,500	I	
2002	Elloluv	Pat Valenzuela	Craig Dollase	J. Paul Reddam	1 1/16 miles	1:42.88	$356,500	I	
2001	Habibti	Victor Espinoza	Bob Baffert	The Thoroughbred Corporation	1 1/16 miles	1:43.12	$358,000	I	
2000	I Believe in You	Alex O. Solis	Paul J. McGee	Samantha, Jan & Mace Siegel	1 1/16 miles	1:43.57	$341,750	I	
1999	Surfside	Pat Day	D. Wayne Lukas	Overbrook Farm	1 1/16 miles	1:43.51	$380,250	I	
1998	Excellent Meeting	Kent J. Desormeaux	Bob Baffert	Golden Eagle Farm	1 1/16 miles	1:42.14	$400,000	I	
1997	§ Love Lock	Kent J. Desormeaux	D. Wayne Lukas	Michael Tabor	1 1/16 miles	1:42.17	$281,000	I	
1996	Sharp Cat	Corey Nakatani	D. Wayne Lukas	The Thoroughbred Corporation	1 1/16 miles	1:44.69	$276,000	I	
1995	Cara Rafaela	Corey Nakatani	D. Wayne Lukas	Gonzalo Borges Torrealba	1 1/16 miles	1:43.10	$250,000	I	
1994	Serena's Song	Corey Nakatani	D. Wayne Lukas	Robert & Beverly Lewis	1 1/16 miles	1:41.96	$250,000	I	
1993	Sardula	Eddie Delahoussaye	Brian A. Mayberry	Ann & Jerry Moss	1 1/16 miles	1:42.34	$252,900	I	
1992	Creaking Board (GB)	Corey Nakatani	Robert J. Frankel	Patrizio Cozzi	1 1/16 miles	1:43.73	$250,000	I	
1991	Magical Maiden	Gary L. Stevens	Warren Stute	Clement L. Hirsch	1 1/16 miles	1:42.74	$251,100	I	
1990	Cuddles	Gary L. Stevens	D. Wayne Lukas	Overbrook Farm	1 mile	1:36.20	$500,000	I	
1989	Cheval Volant	Alex O. Solis	Kenneth J. Jumps	Kenneth J. Jumps, Steve Shapiro & David Stark	1 mile	1:35.60	$500,000	I	
1988	Stocks Up	Alex O. Solis	Ted West	Alan Prible, John Coehlo, Charles Johnson & Pete Valenti	1 mile	1:35.00	$581,250	I	
1987	Goodbye Halo	Jorge Velasquez	Charles E. Whittingham	Alex Campbell Jr. & Arthur B. Hancock III	1 mile	1:36.20	$549,100	I	
1986	Very Subtle	Pat Valenzuela	Melvin F. Stute	Carl Grinstead & Ben Rochelle	1 mile	1:37.00	$500,000	I	
1985	I'm Splendid	Chris McCarron	James J. Toner	Caesar P. Kimmel	1 mile	1:36.00	$625,850	I	
1984	Outstandingly	Walter Guerra	Frank Martin Sr.	Harbor View Farm	1 1/16 miles	1:44.00	$702,500	I	
1983	Althea	Laffit Pincay Jr.	D. Wayne Lukas	Helen Alexander, David Aykroyd & Helen Groves	1 1/16 miles	1:43.00	$500,000	I	
1982	Fabulous Notion	Donald Pierce	James Jordan	Pine Meadow Thoroughbreds	1 1/16 miles	1:42.40	$518,850		
1981	Skillful Joy	Chris McCarron	Leland R. Fenstermaker	Fred W. Hooper	1 1/16 miles	1:43.20	$427,250		
1980	Race not held								
Starlet Stakes
1979	Eloquent	Donald Pierce	Laz Barrera	Harbor View Farm	6 furlongs	1:09.00	$43,200		3YO

Legend:
All Weather Track Dirt
Notes:
§ Ran as an entry

== See also ==
- List of American and Canadian Graded races
- Road to the Kentucky Oaks
