= Allaire du Pont =

American sportswoman (1913–2006)

- Born: Helena Allaire Crozer; May 4, 1913; United States
- Died: January 6, 2006 (aged 92); Chesapeake City, Maryland
- Occupations: Aviator; Racehorse owner/breeder
- Known for: Kelso
- Board member of: Jockey Club (United States), Greener Pastures
- Spouse: Richard Chichester du Pont
- Children: Richard Jr. (1937–1986); Helena A. (1939-2025)
- Parent(s): Samuel A. Crozer & Helena Rutgers

Helena Allaire Crozer du Pont (May 4, 1913 – January 6, 2006) was an American sportswoman and a member of the prominent French-American du Pont family of chemical manufacturers who is most remembered as the owner of the Thoroughbred horse racing Hall of Fame champion, Kelso.

Born Helena Allaire Crozer, in 1934 she married Richard C. du Pont with whom she had a son, Richard Jr. and a daughter Helena. An avid sportsperson, she was an Olympic Trap shooter and a champion tennis player. Allaire du Pont and her husband were both glider and powered aircraft pilots. She set a national endurance record for women gliders in 1935. In the early days of flying when it was still a novelty, doing stunts was popular and she once flew her plane under the Chesapeake City bridge. Her husband died in 1943 while working for the War effort when a U.S. government experimental glider in which he was a passenger crashed during a demonstration flight. In 1947, she established the Richard C. du Pont Memorial Trophy to be awarded annually to the United States National Open Class Soaring Champion.

== Thoroughbred horse racing ==
Always a lover of animals, Allaire du Pont operated Woodstock Farm in Chesapeake City, Maryland and raced under the nom de course Bohemia Stable. She hired future Hall of Fame trainer Carl Hanford to condition her horses for racing.

Bohemia Stable produced a number of top horses such as multiple stakes winner Politely and Shine Again, winner of the 2001 and 2002 Grade I Ballerina Handicap. However, it was her gelding Kelso who brought her wide recognition during the 1960s when he was voted U.S. Horse of the Year honors for an unmatched five consecutive years from 1960 through 1964 and was a 1967 Racing Hall of Fame inductee. A fox hunting participant, Allaire du Pont rode Kelso in hunts after he was retired.

A member of the Jockey Club (United States), the Thoroughbred Owners and Breeders Association, and the Thoroughbred Charities of America, she was also a founding member of the Grayson-Jockey Club Research Foundation. Good friends with Canadian business magnate and Thoroughbred owner and breeder E. P. Taylor, when he visited her home she convinced Taylor to build his planned American branch of Windfields Farm in the area. A preservationist, du Pont was among the first to commit some of her property to Maryland's Agricultural Land Preservation Program. Following the death of E. P. Taylor in 1989, Allaire du Pont was instrumental in having 2,500 acres (10 km^{2}) of his property go into permanent preservation rather than be sub-divided into building lots by real estate developers.

Du Pont was also a co-founder and member of the board of directors of Thoroughbred Charities of America, an organization whose activities include raising funds to save retired horses. Among the other charitable causes to which she devoted both time and money were Paws for Life, Mid-Atlantic Horse Rescue, Greener Pastures, and the Union Hospital, of which she was an honorary member of the board of directors.

In 1983, Allaire du Pont, Martha F. Gerry, and Penny Chenery became the first women to be admitted as members of The Jockey Club.

The Grade III Pimlico Breeders' Cup Distaff Handicap at Pimlico Race Course was renamed the Allaire du Pont Breeders' Cup Distaff in her memory.

Allaire du Pont died January 6, 2006, at her Woodstock Farm near Chesapeake City, Maryland.
