= J. Larry Jones =

American horse trainer (born 1956)

Larry Jones
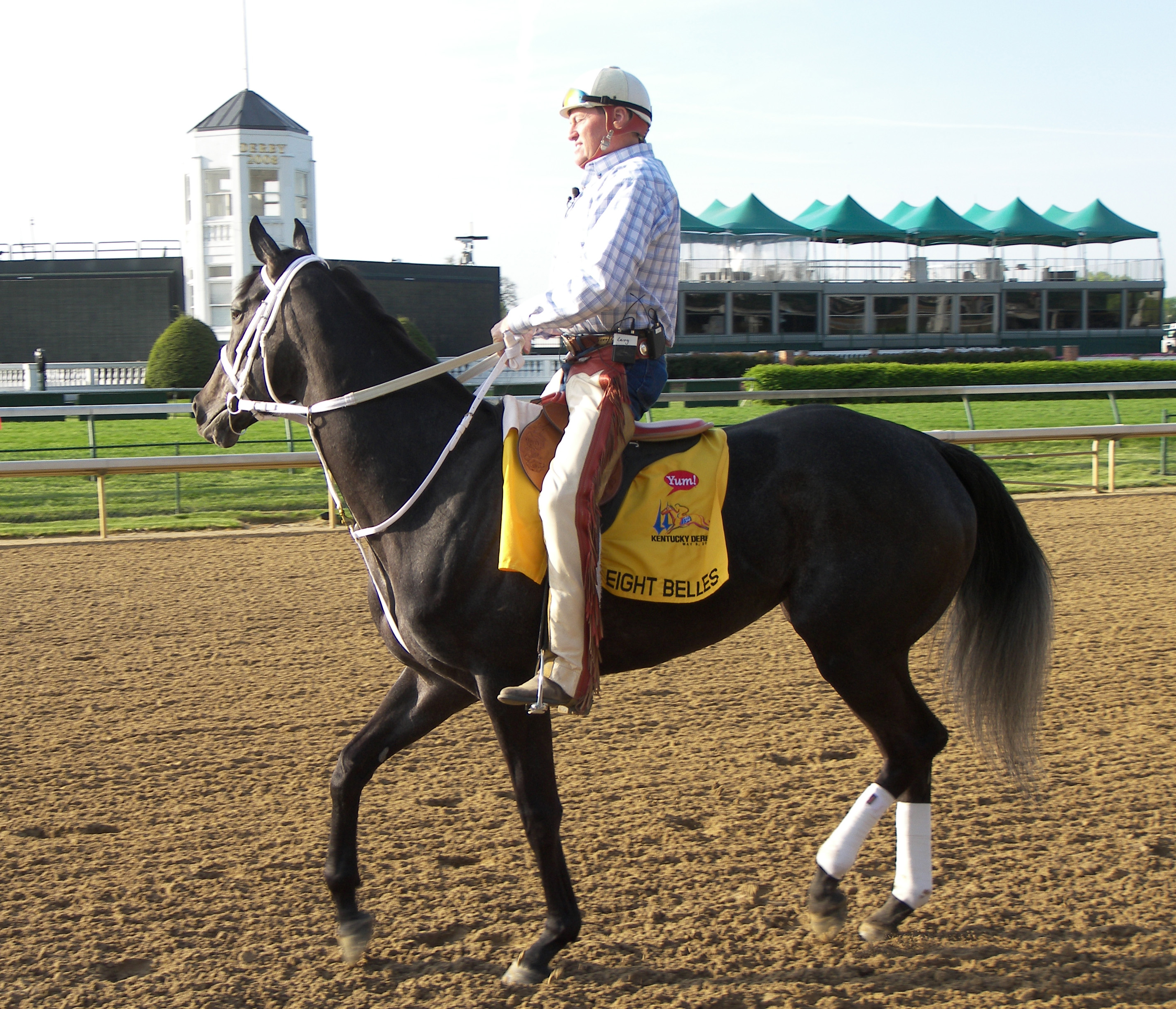
- Eight Belles being ridden by her trainer, Larry Jones, prior to the Kentucky Derby in 2008.

Personal information
- Born: September 2, 1956 (age 70) Hopkinsville, Kentucky, U.S.
- Occupation: Trainer

Horse racing career
- Sport: Horse racing
- Career wins: 1,001+ (ongoing)

Major racing wins
- Fantasy Stakes (2003, 2008, 2011); Acorn Stakes (2004); Delaware Handicap (2005); Nassau County Breeders' Cup Stakes (2006); Prioress Breeders' Cup Stakes (2006); Kentucky Cup Classic Stakes (2007); King's Bishop Stakes (2007); Lane's End Stakes (2007); Alabama Stakes (2008); Allaire duPont Distaff Stakes (2008); Fair Grounds Oaks (2008, 2012); Kentucky Oaks (2008, 2012, 2015); Remsen Stakes (2008); Honeybee Stakes (2008, 2009, 2011); Lecomte Stakes (2009); Risen Star Stakes (2009); Louisiana Derby (2009); Southwest Stakes (2009); Carter Handicap (2009); Monmouth Oaks (2008, 2009); Black-Eyed Susan Stakes (2009); Bourbonette Oaks (2011); Azeri Stakes (2011); Apple Blossom Handicap (2011); Obeah Stakes (2011); Woodward Stakes (2011); Beldame Stakes (2011); Tempted Stakes (2011); Black Gold Stakes (2012); Peter Pan Stakes (2012); Pennsylvania Nursery (2017)

Racing awards
- Big Sport of Turfdom Award (2008); Red Smith Award (2007, 2008)

Honours
- Larry Jones Day at Delaware Park Racetrack (2009)

Significant horses
- Hard Spun, Eight Belles, Friesan Fire, Old Fashioned, Wildcat Bettie B, Island Sand, Ruby's Reception, Josh's Madelyn, Just Jenda, Honest Man, Solar Flare, Proud Spell, Havre de Grace, Believe You Can, Lovely Maria, I'm a Chatterbox, Joyful Victory, Prince Lucky

J. Larry Jones (born September 2, 1956) is an American Thoroughbred horse racing trainer. He has trained over one thousand winners, including three winners of the Kentucky Oaks: Proud Spell in 2008, Believe You Can in 2012, and Lovely Maria in 2015. He has trained two horses who have finished second in the Kentucky Derby; Hard Spun, and the filly Eight Belles.

== Career ==
Jones began training with a horse he owned himself, Ala Turf, in 1980. Originally a farmer of cotton, tobacco and soy bean, Jones found training horses to be much more exciting, and he took out a trainer's license in 1982. In 1986, Jones trained his first victor in a graded stakes race, Capt. Bold, a horse which he had purchased as a yearling for $800.

Jones trained at Ellis Park in Henderson, Kentucky until 2005, when a tornado destroyed much of the facilities, causing Jones to relocate to Delaware Park. He had a few horses at Ellis Park in 2012, and returned there with a full stable in 2018.

In 2007, Hard Spun, became the first contender that Jones trained for a Triple Crown event. Hard Spun was runner-up in the Kentucky Derby and Breeders' Cup Classic, and also won the Lane's End, King's Bishop, and Kentucky Cup Classic Stakes.

In 2008, Jones saddled Proud Spell to a decisive win over a sloppy track in the Kentucky Oaks. Proud Spell went on to win the Eclipse Award for American Champion Three-Year-Old Filly that year, becoming Jones's first Eclipse Award winner. The day after the Kentucky Oaks, Jones saddled his other top filly, Eight Belles, to run in the Kentucky Derby. Eight Belles came second in the race, but shortly after crossing the line broke both front legs, and was humanely euthanized on the track. After Eight Belles' breakdown, Jones was accused of drugging the filly or running an unsound horse and received hate mail from people who felt that he was to blame for the tragedy. Tests done on Eight Belles proved she had run clean. In the summer, Jones announced that after one more year of training, he would retire, partially because he wanted to spend more time with his family.

In 2009, Jones had two top Kentucky Derby hopefuls in Old Fashioned and Friesan Fire. Old Fashioned won the Remsen Stakes at Aqueduct in a romp and became the early favorite for the Derby. He also won the Southwest Stakes at Oaklawn Park by open lengths before he was upset by Win Willy in the Rebel Stakes. In the Arkansas Derby, Old Fashioned finished second to Papa Clem and was retired after it was he had slab-fractured his knee. Friesan Fire impressed on his way to the Derby, sweeping the Lecomte, Risen Star, and the Louisiana Derby at Fair Grounds in Louisiana, and started the 2009 Kentucky Derby as favorite, but went on to finish second-to-last. Friesan Fire went on to run in the Preakness Stakes.

In 2009, Jones trained horses Just Jenda (winner of the 2009 Monmouth Oaks, owned by Jones's wife, Cindy), Solar Flare, Maren's Meadow, Payton d'Oro (2009 Black-Eyed Susan Stakes winner), Kodiak Kowboy, and It Happened Again, continued to compete that season.

Other horses trained by Jones include No Such Word, winner of the 2010 Honeybee Stakes.

== Personal life ==
On November 7, 2009, Jones retired, and his wife, Cindy, took over training duties at the barn. Jones became an assistant to Cindy and galloped horses in the mornings for her. The Joneses are based at Delaware Park in Wilmington, Delaware, in the summer, and at Oaklawn Park in Hot Springs, Arkansas, in the winter.

Jones returned to training after one year of retirement. In April 2014, Jones was seriously injured after falling from a horse during a training ride, but returned to training not long afterwards.

Jones had Two Kids names Amanda and Wesley. (4 GrandChildren with the names, Xander, Juliet, Jensen, and Haven)
