= Melodist (horse) =

American-bred Thoroughbred racehorse

- Sire: The Minstrel
- Grandsire: Northern Dancer
- Dam: Native Nurse
- Damsire: Graustark
- Sex: Mare
- Foaled: 5 March 1985
- Country: United States
- Colour: Bay
- Breeder: Ziw Associates
- Owner: Sheikh Mohammed
- Trainer: Michael Stoute
- Record: 8: 3-2-1

Major wins
- Oaks d'Italia (1988); Irish Oaks (1988)

Melodist (5 March 1985 – after 1999) was an American-bred, British-trained Thoroughbred racehorse and broodmare. As a juvenile in 1987 she showed considerable promise, winning one race and finishing third in the Futurity Stakes. In the following year, she developed into a high-class middle distance performer, winning the Oaks d'Italia and dead-heating for Irish Oaks as well as finishing second in a strongly contested edition of the weight-for-age Geoffrey Freer Stakes. As a broodmare she had some success as a dam of National Hunt horses.

== Background ==
Melodist was a bay mare with no white markings bred in Pennsylvania by Ziw Associates. As a yearling in July 1986 she was consigned to the Keeneland select sale and was bought for $1,100,000 by Sheikh Mohammed's Darley Stud. She was sent to Europe and entered training with Michael Stoute at his Freemason Lodge stable in Newmarket, Suffolk.

She was sired by The Minstrel, a Canadian-bred horse who won The Derby in 1977. As a breeding stallion, The Minstrel sired Bakharoff, Minstrella, Opening Verse, L'Emigrant, Musical Bliss and Palace Music. Melodist was one of several good winners produced by her dam Native Nurse: the others included Love Sign and Fatih (Arcadia Handicap). Native Nurse was descended from the American broodmare Omayya, who was also the female-line ancestor of Americain.

== Racing career ==
=== 1987: two-year-old season ===
Melodist began her racing career by finishing fifth in a maiden race over six furlongs and then ran second in a similar event over a furlong further. In September she started odds-on favourite against sixteen opponents for a maiden over one mile at Brighton Racecourse and won by four lengths. She was then moved up in class when she was sent to Ireland for the Futurity Stakes at the Curragh Racecourse and finished third behind the colts Demon Magic and Gold Discovery.

=== 1988: three-year-old season ===
In 1988 Melodist was ridden in all four of her races by Walter Swinburn. She did not run as a three-year-old until 22 May when she was sent to Italy for the Oaks d'Italia over 2400 metres on soft ground at the San Siro Racecourse in Milan. The finish of the race was dominated by overseas challengers as Melodist won by 1 1/2 lengths from her fellow British raider Asl (previously second in the Musidora Stakes) with the French-trained Summer Trip a neck away in third. On 9 July Melodist was one of nine runners to contest the Irish Oaks over 1 1/2 miles at the Curragh and started at odds of 11/1. The 2/9 favourite for the race was Diminuendo, ridden by Steve Cauthen, who had won The Oaks by four lengths. Both Melodist and Diminuendo were owned by Sheikh Mohammed and based at Newmarket, but whereas Melodist was trained by Stoute, the favourite was trained by Henry Cecil at Warren Place. The other fancied runners were Dancing Goddess (second in the Irish 1000 Guineas), Miss Boniface (Ribblesdale Stakes) and Silver Lane (Prix de la Grotte). Melodist tracked the leaders before overtaking Miss Boniface before going to the front a furlong and a half from the finish. She faced a strong late challenge from Diminuendo and after a sustained struggle the two fillies crossed the line together with the judge declaring a dead heat.

Melodist was matched against older horse and male opposition when she was stepped up in distance for the Geoffrey Freer Stakes over 1 mile 5 1/2 furlongs at Newbury Racecourse on 13 August. After being restrained at the rear of the six-runner field, she took the lead in the straight but hung badly to the right in the closing stages and was beaten two lengths into second by the three-year-old colt Top Class. The leading older horses Ibn Bey and Moon Madness came home fourth and fifth. On her final appearance the filly was sent to France for the Prix Vermeille at Longchamp Racecourse on 11 September but ran poorly and finished last of the eight runners behind Indian Rose.

== Assessment ==
In 1987 the independent Timeform organisation gave Melodist a rating of 92 p (the "p" indicating that she was expected to make more than usual progress) and commented that she would stay at least ten furlongs and was "likely to make up into a useful three-year-old".

== Breeding record ==
After her retirement from racing Melodist became a broodmare for her owners stud. She produced at least twelve named foals and five winners between 1990 and 2006:

- Melaka, a chestnut filly, foaled in 1990, sired by Kris. Unraced.
- Melnik, chestnut colt (later gelded), 1991, by Nashwan. Won three National Hunt races.
- Melqart, chestnut colt (gelded), 1992, by Nashwan. Failed to win in two races
- Song of the Sword, bay colt (gelded), 1993, by Kris. Won two flat races and seven races under National Hunt rules including the Winter Novices' Hurdle.
- Melodica, bay filly, 1994, by Machiavellian. Won one race.
- Octave, bay colt, 1995, by Rainbow Quest. Failed to win in seven races.
- Flautist, chestnut filly, 1997, by Lion Cavern. Unraced.
- Meseta, bay filly, 1998, by Lion Cavern. Unraced. Dam of Won in the Dark (Durkan Juvenile Hurdle, Champion Four Year Old Hurdle).
- Kate Maher, bay filly, 1999, Rainbow Quest. Failed to win in two races.
- Mrs Pankhurst, bay filly, 2001, by Selkirk. Won one race.
- Frith, bay colt (gelded), 2002, by Benny the Dip. Won two National Hunt races.
- Fleur de Lis, chestnut filly, 2006, by Nayef. Unplaced on only start.

== Pedigree ==
Pedigree of Melodist (USA), bay mare, 1985
Sire The Minstrel (CAN) 1974	Northern Dancer (CAN); 1961	Nearctic	Nearco
Sire The Minstrel (CAN) 1974	Northern Dancer (CAN); 1961	Nearctic	Lady Angela
Sire The Minstrel (CAN) 1974	Northern Dancer (CAN); 1961	Natalma	Native Dancer
Sire The Minstrel (CAN) 1974	Northern Dancer (CAN); 1961	Natalma	Almahmoud
Sire The Minstrel (CAN) 1974	Fleur (CAN); 1964	Victoria Park	Chop Chop
Sire The Minstrel (CAN) 1974	Fleur (CAN); 1964	Victoria Park	Victoriana
Sire The Minstrel (CAN) 1974	Fleur (CAN); 1964	Flaming Page	Bull Page
Sire The Minstrel (CAN) 1974	Fleur (CAN); 1964	Flaming Page	Flaring Top
Dam Native Nurse (USA) 1970	Graustark (USA); 1963	Ribot	Tenerani
Dam Native Nurse (USA) 1970	Graustark (USA); 1963	Ribot	Romanella
Dam Native Nurse (USA) 1970	Graustark (USA); 1963	Flower Bowl	Alibhai
Dam Native Nurse (USA) 1970	Graustark (USA); 1963	Flower Bowl	Flower Bed
Dam Native Nurse (USA) 1970	Indian Nurse (USA); 1955	Mahmoud	Blenheim
Dam Native Nurse (USA) 1970	Indian Nurse (USA); 1955	Mahmoud	Mah Mahal
Dam Native Nurse (USA) 1970	Indian Nurse (USA); 1955	Gallant Nurse	War Admiral
Dam Native Nurse (USA) 1970	Indian Nurse (USA); 1955	Gallant Nurse	Omayya (Family: 1-n)
