= Minstrella =

American-bred Thoroughbred racehorse

- Sire: The Minstrel
- Grandsire: Northern Dancer
- Dam: Flight Dancer
- Damsire: Misty Flight
- Sex: Mare
- Foaled: 22 March 1984
- Died: 2012 (Aged 27-28)
- Country: United States
- Colour: Grey
- Breeder: Edward P. Evans
- Owner: Edward Evans
- Trainer: Charlie Nelson; Philip Johnson
- Record: 11: 4-2-0

Major wins
- Chesham Stakes (1986); Phoenix Stakes (1986); Moyglare Stud Stakes (1986); Cheveley Park Stakes (1986)

Awards
- Timeform rating 121 (1985), 120 (1987); Top-rated two-year-old filly in Ireland (1986)

Minstrella (22 March 1984 – 2012) was an American-bred, British-trained Thoroughbred racehorse and broodmare. She was one of the best two-year-old fillies of her generation in Europe in 1986 when she won four of her seven races. She recorded her first win in the Chesham Stakes before going on to record Group One victories in the Phoenix Stakes, Moyglare Stud Stakes and Cheveley Park Stakes. The last of these wins came after the controversial disqualification of Forest Flower. Minstrella failed to win in four attempts as a three-year-old and was retired from racing. She had considerable success as a broodmare in the United States. Minstrella died in 2012 at the age of twenty-eight.

== Background ==
Minstrella was a "robust", "powerful" grey (officially roan) mare with a white blaze and a white sock on her right front foot. She was bred by her owner Edward P "Ned" Evans who owned the Spring Hill Farm near Casanova, Virginia. She was sired by The Minstrel, a Canadian-bred horse who won The Derby in 1977. As a breeding stallion, The Minstrel was not a spectacular success, but he did sire many good winners including the Breeders' Cup Mile winner Opening Verse, the 1000 Guineas winner Musical Bliss and the Poule d'Essai des Poulains winner L'Emigrant as well as Palace Music, who won the Champion Stakes and sired Cigar. Minstrella's dam Flight Dancer won four times as a juvenile in 1970 and was a half-sister to the Jockey Club Stakes winner Dancing Moss. She was also a granddaughter of the leading North American racemare Gallorette.

The filly was sent to race in Europe and entered training with Charlie Nelson at Kingsdown Stables at Upper Lambourn in Berkshire. Evans had not previously raced his stock in Europe, and the change of strategy was prompted by the fact that many of his horses had strong European influences in their pedigrees.

== Racing career ==
=== 1986: two-year-old season ===
After finishing fourth in a five furlong maiden race in April, Minstrella ran second to Jay Gee Ell in a minor event at York Racecourse in May, starting slowly and racing as though she was unwilling to give her best effort. Despite her moderate form, the filly was then moved up in class and distance and matched against colts in the Chesham Stakes over six furlongs at Royal Ascot in June. Ridden by John Reid she won impressively from Chime Time and Luzum. Minstrella was stepped up again for the Group Three Cherry Hinton Stakes at Newmarket Racecourse in which she faced the Ian Balding-trained Forest Flower (winner of the Queen Mary Stakes and owned by Ned Evans' cousin Paul Mellon). She took the lead a furlong out but began to swish her tail under pressure and was beaten three quarters of a length by Forest Flower: Timeform noted that she was a filly who "had her foibles".

The Heinz '57' Phoenix Stakes at Phoenix Park Racecourse on 10 August was the most valuable race for two-year-olds run in Europe in 1986. Forest Flower started favourite ahead of Polonia (winner of the Railway Stakes) with Minstrella next in the betting on 5/1 alongside Flawless Image, whilst the other runners included the colts Sizzling Melody (Norfolk Stakes), Dominion Royale (Curragh Stakes) and Wiganthorpe. Reid sent Minstrella into the lead in the last quarter mile and held off a strong challenge from Forest Flower to win by a short head, with Polonia a length away in third and Wiganthorpe the best of the colts in fourth. In the York meeting less than two weeks later the form of the race was boosted when Polonia won the Lowther Stakes, whilst the Gimcrack Stakes was won by Wiganthorpe. Minstrella and Polonia met again in the Group One Moyglare Stud Stakes at the Curragh on 14 September. Minstrella was made the 9/10 favourite ahead of Polonia on 6/4 with Angel's Share the only one of the other six fillies to start at less than 20/1. Ridden patiently by Reid, she accelerated into the lead inside the final furlong and drew away to win by two and a half lengths and five lengths from Polonia and Indian Lily.

Minstrella's final race of the season saw her face Forest Flower (who had won against colts in the Mill Reef Stakes) for the third time in the Group One Cheveley Park Stakes at Newmarket on 1 October. She started 11/10 favourite ahead of her rival, with the other three runners being Canadian Mill, Shaikiya (runner-up to Sizzling Melody in the Flying Childers Stakes) and Indian Lily. The race proved to be a highly controversial one. Forest Flower seemed to be boxed in two furlongs from the finish, and her rider Tony Ives, in extricating the filly from her unfavourable position, bumped into Minstrella, who was clearly hampered. Minstrella was unable to recover and was beaten two and a half lengths. Reid immediately lodged an objection to the winner, but the racecourse stewards ruled that the interference had been accidental and left the result unaltered. After decision Evans reportedly told Nelson "We've been robbed here". Minstrella's connections then took their case to the disciplinary committee of the Jockey Club, who overturned the original decision, ruling that Ives's manoeuvre had constituted intentional interference. Minstrella was awarded the race whilst Forest Flower was disqualified and placed last. Timeform described the decision as "unjust", but pointed out that the committee had acted correctly according to the rules of racing. In 2010 a Racing Post correspondent described the 1986 Cheveley Park Stakes as "one of the most controversial Group I races of the last 25 years".

=== 1987: three-year-old season ===
Minstrella made her second-season debut in the 1000 Guineas over the Rowley Mile at Newmarket on 30 April for which she started at odds of 15/2 and finished sixth of the fourteen runners behind Miesque. In the Irish 1000 Guineas just over three weeks later she again finished sixth, three and a half lengths behind her old rival Forest Flower. At Royal Ascot in June she was brought back in distance for the Cork and Orrery Stakes over six furlongs and finished fourth to the Irish colt Big Shuffle.

After her defeat at Ascot, Minstrella was sent to race in America where she reappeared in the Queen Elizabeth II Challenge Cup Stakes at Keeneland Race Course in October. Racing on Lasix, she finished last of the ten runners behind Graceful Derby.

== Assessment ==
In 1986, Minstrella was rated the best two-year-old filly to race in Ireland but was only fifth in the European International Classification behind Forest Flower, Miesque, Milligram and Sakura Reiko. The independent Timeform organisation gave her a rating of 121, six pounds behind their top juvenile filly Forest Flower. In 1987 Timeform rated her on 120, twelve pounds below their highest rated three-year-old filly Indian Skimmer.

== Breeding record ==
Minstrella was retired from racing and returned to her birthplace to become a broodmare at her owner's stud in Virginia. She produced at least sixteen foals and eleven winners between 1989 and 2007. She was the dam of three Graded stakes races and the female-line ancestor of three others:

- Prospectors Music, a brown colt, foaled in 1989, sired by Mr. Prospector. Unraced.
- Minidar, grey filly, 1990, by Alydar. Won eight races including the Grade III Chicago Handicap. Dam of A Little Warm (Jim Dandy Stakes) and grand-dam of Mini Sermon (Top Flight Handicap)
- Rock Band, grey colt, 1991, by Mr. Prospector. Won one race.
- Sisterella, brown filly, 1992, by Diesis. Won one race.
- Look West, grey colt, 1993, by Pleasant Colony. Won four races.
- Colonial Minstrel, grey filly, 1994, by Pleasant Colony. Won ten races including Humana Distaff Handicap, Shuvee Handicap.
- Minicolony, grey filly, 1995, by Pleasant Colony. Failed to win in five races.
- Casanova Star, chestnut colt, 1996, by A.P. Indy. Won four races.
- Unrestrained, grey filly, 1998, by Unbridled. Won five races.
- Colonella, bay filly, 1999, by Pleasant Colony. Won four races. Dam of Pleasant Strike (Arlington Classic)
- Indy Minstrel, chestnut colt, 2001, by A.P. Indy. Failed to win in five races.
- Mambo Minstrel, chestnut colt, 2002, by Kingmambo. Won one race.
- Flight West, grey colt, 2003, by Gone West. Won one race.
- Winstrella, grey colt, 2004, by Gone West. Won three races.
- Slam Dance, bay colt, 2006, by Grand Slam. Unraced.
- Bad Boy Sparta, grey colt, 2007, by Grand Slam. Unraced

Minstrella was euthanised in early 2012 at the age of twenty-eight and was buried at Spring Hill Farm.

== Pedigree ==
Pedigree of Minstrella (USA), grey mare, 1984
Sire The Minstrel (CAN) 1974	Northern Dancer (CAN); 1961	Nearctic	Nearco
Sire The Minstrel (CAN) 1974	Northern Dancer (CAN); 1961	Nearctic	Lady Angela
Sire The Minstrel (CAN) 1974	Northern Dancer (CAN); 1961	Natalma	Native Dancer
Sire The Minstrel (CAN) 1974	Northern Dancer (CAN); 1961	Natalma	Almahmoud
Sire The Minstrel (CAN) 1974	Fleur (CAN); 1964	Victoria Park	Chop Chop
Sire The Minstrel (CAN) 1974	Fleur (CAN); 1964	Victoria Park	Victoriana
Sire The Minstrel (CAN) 1974	Fleur (CAN); 1964	Flaming Page	Bull Page
Sire The Minstrel (CAN) 1974	Fleur (CAN); 1964	Flaming Page	Flaring Top
Dam Flight Dancer (USA) 1968	Misty Flight (USA); 1955	Princequillo	Prince Rose
Dam Flight Dancer (USA) 1968	Misty Flight (USA); 1955	Princequillo	Cosquilla
Dam Flight Dancer (USA) 1968	Misty Flight (USA); 1955	Grey Flight	Mahmoud
Dam Flight Dancer (USA) 1968	Misty Flight (USA); 1955	Grey Flight	Planetoid
Dam Flight Dancer (USA) 1968	Courbette (USA); 1957	Native Dancer	Polynesian
Dam Flight Dancer (USA) 1968	Courbette (USA); 1957	Native Dancer	Geisha
Dam Flight Dancer (USA) 1968	Courbette (USA); 1957	Gallorette	Challenger
Dam Flight Dancer (USA) 1968	Courbette (USA); 1957	Gallorette	Gallette (Family: 17-b)

- Minstrella was inbred 3 x 4 to Native Dancer, meaning that this stallion appears in both the third and fourth generations of her pedigree.
