= Bakharoff =

American-bred Thoroughbred racehorse

- Sire: The Minstrel
- Grandsire: Northern Dancer
- Dam: Qui Royalty
- Damsire: Native Royalty
- Sex: Stallion
- Foaled: 12 February 1983
- Country: United States
- Colour: Bay
- Breeder: Edward A. Cox Jr.
- Owner: Khalid Abdullah
- Trainer: Guy Harwood
- Record: 12: 4-3-4

Major wins
- Chesham Stakes (1985); William Hill Futurity (1985); Geoffrey Freer Stakes (1986)

Awards
- Top-rated European two-year-old (1985); Timeform rating 130 (1985), 124 (1986)

Bakharoff (foaled 12 February 1983) was an American-bred British-trained Thoroughbred racehorse and sire. He was the highest-rated European two-year-old of 1985 when he won the William Hill Futurity and the Chesham Stakes as well as finishing second in the Dewhurst Stakes. As a three-year-old he was overshadowed by his stable companion Dancing Brave, but he showed good form to win the Geoffrey Freer Stakes and finish third in both the Prix du Jockey Club and the Irish Derby. In all, he achieved four wins and seven places in a twelve race career which lasted from April 1985 until September 1986. He later stood as a breeding stallion in New Zealand with modest results.

== Background ==
Bakharoff was a "big, strong, close-coupled" bay horse with a small white star and a white sock on his left hind leg bred by Edward A. Cox Jr. who stabled his mares at the Claiborne Farm near Paris, Kentucky. He was sired by The Minstrel, a Canadian-bred horse who won The Derby in 1977. As a breeding stallion, The Minstrel was not a spectacular success, but he did sire many good winners includingthe Breeders' Cup Mile winner Opening Verse, the 1000 Guineas winner Musical Bliss and the Poule d'Essai des Poulains winner L'Emigrant as well as Palace Music, who won the Champion Stakes and sired Cigar. Bakharoff's dam, Qui Royalty, produced several other winners including the Lockinge Stakes winner Emperor Jones and was a direct descendant of the 1000 Guineas winner Imprudence. One of Qui Royalty's daughter's, Qui Bid, produced the German 1,000 Guineas winner Que Belle.

As a (horse), Bakharoff was consigned to the Keeneland Select sale by Lea Eaton where he was bought for $450,000 by the bloodstock agent James Delahooke, acting on behalf of the Saudi prince Khalid Abdulla. The colt was sent into training with Guy Harwood at Pulborough. At the time, Harwood was noted for his modern approach to training, introducing Britain to features such as artificial gallops and barn-style stabling.

== Racing career ==
=== 1985: two-year-old season ===
Bakharoff made his racecourse debut when he finished unplaced in a maiden race over the minimum distance of five furlongs at Newmarket Racecourse on 16 April. A month later he recorded his first victory when easily winning a maiden over the same distance at Sandown Park Racecourse. He was then moved up in class and distance to contest the Chesham Stakes, a Listed race over six furlong at Royal Ascot in June. Bakharoff took the lead at half distance and accelerated away to win impressively by five lengths from Alkaaleel. Many of the horses in Harwood's stable suffered from a viral infection in 1985, and Bakharoff was not at his best in his next race a month later when he finished third to Green Desert and Atall Atall in the Group Three July Stakes at Newmarket.

Bakharoff was off the course for three months before returning in Britain's most prestigious two-year-old race, the Dewhurst Stakes over seven furlongs at Newmarket on 18 October. Ridden by Greville Starkey, he started at odds of 11/1 in a field of eight runners. He tracked the leaders in the early stages but struggled to maintain his position when the pace quickened two furlongs from the finish. Starkey switched the colt to the outside to obtain a clear run and Bakharoff produced a very strong run, making up several lengths and finishing second, three-quarters of a length behind the winner Huntingdale. The favourite Sure Blade finished third, with the Irish-trained Woodman in fifth. Eight days after his defeat at Newmarket, Bakharoff moved up in distance to contest the Group One William Hill Futurity over one mile at Doncaster Racecourse. He started the 2/1 favourite against eight opponents headed by Water Cay and Bold Arrangement, runners-up in the Royal Lodge Stakes and the Grand Critérium respectively. As in the Dewhurst, Bakharoff briefly looked outpaced in the straight but then produced a strong finish despite being hampered by Bold Arrangement. He took the lead inside the final furlong and won by one and a half lengths from the subsequently disqualified Bold Arrangement, with Nomrood two lengths back in third place.

=== 1986: three-year-old season ===
Throughout the winter of 1985/6, Bakharoff was regarded a leading contender for the 1986 Epsom Derby although there were widespread rumours that he was inferior to his lightly raced stable companion Dancing Brave. He began his three-year-old season in the Highland Spring Derby Trial at Lingfield Park Racecourse on 10 May, when he started the 11/10 favourite but was beaten half a length by Mashkour. As Bakharoff's trainer and owner had Dancing Brave to represent their interests in the Derby, Bakharoff was rerouted from Epsom to contest the Prix du Jockey-Club over 2400 metres at Chantilly Racecourse on 8 June. He started at odds of 7/2 but after being settled in the middle of the field he could never reach the leaders and finished third behind Bering and Altayan. Three weeks later, Bakharoff started at odds of 9/2 for the Irish Derby at the Curragh and finished third of the eleven runners behind Shahrastani and Bonhomie.

On his next appearance, Bakharoff was moved up in distance and matched against older horses for the first time in the Group Two Geoffrey Freer Stakes over thirteen furlongs at Newbury Racecourse. Ridden by Willie Carson and starting the 6/4 favourite, Bakharoff took the lead approaching the final furlong and looked likely to win easily but idled in the lead and won by only a length from Sirk, with the four-year-old filly I Want To Be in third. Following his win at Newbury, Bakharoff was strongly fancied for the St Leger Stakes but the Harwood stable preferred to rely on Allez Milord (who finished last behind Moon Madness). Bakharoff was instead sent to Kempton Park Racecourse for the Group Three September Stakes over eleven furlongs on 5 September in which he was narrowly beaten by the four-year-old Dihistan. Bakharoff's last race was the Cumberland Lodge Stakes at Ascot Racecourse in late September. He started the odds-on favourite but finished third of the four runners behind Kazaroun. He was subsequently revealed to have sustained a leg injury in the race and was retired from racing.

== Assessment ==
In the official International Classification for 1985, Bakharoff was the highest-rated two-year-old in Europe, one pound ahead of Huntingdale, and three pounds ahead of Bold Arrangement, Nomrood, Sure Blade and the leading filly Baiser Vole. The independent Timeform organisation, however, named Huntingdale as the best two-year-old with a rating of 132 ahead of Bakharoff on 130. In the following year he was given a rating of 124 by Timeform, sixteen pounds behind the top-rated Dancing Brave. In the International Classification, he was ranked the fifth-best colt in Europe over twelve furlongs behind Dancing Brave, Shahrastani, Bonhomie and Allez Milord.

== Stud record ==
At the end of his racing career, Bakharoff was sold to become a breeding stallion in New Zealand. He later returned to Europe and stood in France and Hungary. He appears to have sired few horses of any consequence although his son Roysyn won the New Zealand Derby in 1995.

== Pedigree ==
Pedigree of Bakharoff (USA), bay stallion, 1983
| Sire The Minstrel (CAN) 1974 | Northern Dancer (CAN); 1961 | Nearctic | Nearco |
| Sire The Minstrel (CAN) 1974 | Northern Dancer (CAN); 1961 | Nearctic | Lady Angela |
| Sire The Minstrel (CAN) 1974 | Northern Dancer (CAN); 1961 | Natalma | Native Dancer |
| Sire The Minstrel (CAN) 1974 | Northern Dancer (CAN); 1961 | Natalma | Almahmoud |
| Sire The Minstrel (CAN) 1974 | Fleur (CAN); 1964 | Victoria Park | Chop Chop |
| Sire The Minstrel (CAN) 1974 | Fleur (CAN); 1964 | Victoria Park | Victoriana |
| Sire The Minstrel (CAN) 1974 | Fleur (CAN); 1964 | Flaming Page | Bull Page |
| Sire The Minstrel (CAN) 1974 | Fleur (CAN); 1964 | Flaming Page | Flaring Top |
| Dam Qui Royalty (USA) 1977 | Native Royalty (USA); 1967 | Raise a Native | Native Dancer |
| Dam Qui Royalty (USA) 1977 | Native Royalty (USA); 1967 | Raise a Native | Raise You |
| Dam Qui Royalty (USA) 1977 | Native Royalty (USA); 1967 | Queen Nasra | Nasrullah |
| Dam Qui Royalty (USA) 1977 | Native Royalty (USA); 1967 | Queen Nasra | Bayborough |
| Dam Qui Royalty (USA) 1977 | Qui Blink (USA); 1966 | Francis S. | Royal Charger |
| Dam Qui Royalty (USA) 1977 | Qui Blink (USA); 1966 | Francis S. | Blue Eyed Momo |
| Dam Qui Royalty (USA) 1977 | Qui Blink (USA); 1966 | Winking Star | Dark Star |
| Dam Qui Royalty (USA) 1977 | Qui Blink (USA); 1966 | Winking Star | Peccadillo (Family:22-d) |

- Bakharoff was inbred 4 × 4 to Native Dancer, meaning that this stallion appears twice in the fourth generation of his pedigree.
