= L'Emigrant =

American-bred Thoroughbred racehorse (1980 – c. 1995)

- Racing colours of Stavros Niarchos
- Sire: The Minstrel
- Grandsire: Northern Dancer
- Dam: Suprina
- Damsire: Vaguely Noble
- Sex: Stallion
- Foaled: 26 April 1980
- Country: United States
- Colour: Dark Bay or Brown
- Breeder: Bedford Farm Inc
- Owner: Stavros Niarchos
- Trainer: François Boutin
- Record: 12:5-5-2

Major wins
- Prix La Rochette (1982); Critérium de Maisons-Laffitte (1982); Prix Djebel (1983); Poule d'Essai des Poulains (1983); Prix Lupin (1983)

Awards
- Timeform rating: 126 (1982), 129 (1983); Top-rated French-trained three-year-old colt (1983)
- Last updated on 29 September 2025

L'Emigrant (26 April 1980 – c. 1995) was an American-bred, French-trained Thoroughbred racehorse and sire. One of the best horses of his generation in Europe at two and three years of age, he won five of his twelve races and never finished worse than third in a racing career which lasted from August 1982 until September 1983. He won the Prix La Rochette and Critérium de Maisons-Laffitte as two-year-old and went on to win the Prix Djebel, Poule d'Essai des Poulains and Prix Lupin in the following year. He was also placed in several major races including the Grand Critérium, Prix du Jockey Club, Prix d'Ispahan, Prix Jacques Le Marois, Prix du Moulin and Man o' War Stakes. He was retired from racing at the end of 1983 but had little success a breeding stallion.

== Background ==
L'Emigrant was a very good-looking brown horse with a narrow white blaze and two white socks bred by Bedford Farms Inc of Paris, Kentucky. He was sired by The Minstrel, a Canadian-bred horse who won the Derby in 1977. He also sired Breeders' Cup Mile winner Opening Verse, 1000 Guineas winner Musical Bliss and the William Hill Futurity winner Bakharoff, as well as Palace Music who won the Champion Stakes and sired Cigar. L'Emigrant's dam Suprina had previously produced the filly Salpinx, who was beaten a short head by Three Troikas in the Prix Vermeille. Suprina was a daughter of Perfecta who was a sister of Halo, Tosmah and Queen Sucree, the dam of Cannonade. Perfecta was a granddaughter of the influential broodmare Almahmoud, whose other descendants included Northern Dancer, Danehill, Machiavellian and Bago.

In July 1981 L'Emigrant was sent to the Keeneland Sales where he was bought for $325,000 by Philip Payne-Gallwey of the British Bloodstock Agency (England), acting on behalf of Stavros Niarchos. The colt was sent to Europe where he was trained by François Boutin.

== Racing career ==
=== 1982: two-year-old season ===
L'Emigrant made his racecourse debut in a maiden race over 1200 metres at Deauville Racecourse in August in which he finished second by a neck to Crystal Glitters, a subsequent Group One winner. In the following month, the colt was moved up in class to contest the Group Three Prix La Rochette over 1600m at Longchamp Racecourse. Ridden by Lester Piggott, he took the lead 400m from the finish and won impressively by three lengths from Le Voleur. On 10 October L'Emigrant was ridden by Cash Asmussen in France's premier race for two-year-olds, the Grand Critérium over 1600m on soft ground at Longchamp. He took the lead in the straight and held off the challenge of Deep Roots (winner of the Prix Morny and Prix de la Salamandre) but was overtaken in the closing stages by Saint Cyrien, and finished second by a length. In late October, L'Emigrant ran in the Critérium de Maisons-Laffitte over 1400m in which he was opposed by Crystal Glitters, the Prix Thomas Bryon winner Bal des Fees and three challengers from England. Starting the odds-on favourite he took the lead 300m from the finish and won comfortably by one and a half lengths from Drumalis, who was carrying seven pounds less than the winner.

=== 1983: three-year-old season ===
L'Emigrant began his three-year-old season in early April, when he recorded an easy three length win over Ginger Brink in the Prix Djebel over 1400m at Maisons-Laffitte. Later that month he started second favourite behind Saint Cyrien in the Poule d'Essai des Poulains over 1600m at Longchamp. Asmussen sent the colt into the lead on the turn ito the straight and he turned back several challengers to win comfortably from Crystal Glitters, Margouzed and the British-trained Sackford, with Saint Cyrien in sixth. L'Emigrant was then aimed at the Prix du Jockey Club and prepared for the race by running in the Group One Prix Lupin over 2100m at Longchamp on 15 May. Starting the 7/10 favourite on extremely heavy ground he won the race, but was not particularly impressive: he took the lead in the straight but appeared to be tiring in the closing stages and had to be ridden out by Asmusen to win narrowly from Lovely Dancer and Pluralisme. In the Prix du Jockey Club over 2400m at Chantilly Racecourse on 5 June, L'Emigrant started joint-favourite with the Irish-trained Caerleon. Asmussen restrained the colt in the early stages before producing him with a late run in the straight, but he was never able to get close enough to mount a serious challenge to Caerleon and was beaten three lengths. There was some criticism of Asmussen after the race from commentators who felt that he had given the horse too much ground to make up, while other pointed to L'Emigrant's demanding spring campaign as the reason for his failure. Asmussen, however, said that the colt failed to stay the distance and was "beaten by a better horse that day".

Following his defeat at Chantilly, L'Emigrant was brought back in distance for his next three races. On 28 June he was matched against older horses for the first time when he started odds-on favourite for the Prix d'Ispahan over 1900m. He finished third behind Crystal Glitters and Darly, having been given an indifferent ride by Asmussen, who again employed exaggerated waiting tactics. L'Emigrant's next race was the Prix Jacques Le Marois over 1600m at Deauville Racecourse in August. Starting favourite at odds of 11/4 he got the better of a sustained struggle with the British challenger Noalcoholic but was overtaken in the closing stages and beaten one and a half lengths by the improving filly Luth Enchantee. The unplaced horses included Ma Biche, Crystal Glitters and Deep Roots. On 4 September L'Emigrant and Luth Enchantee met again in the Prix du Moulin at Longchamp. On this occasion, L'Emigrant was retrained by Asmussen in the early stages before accelerating clear of the field in the straight. He looked almost certain to win, but was caught by Luth Enchantee in the closing stages and was beaten half a length. The pair finished eight lengths clear of the rest of the field, which included Wassl (Irish 2000 Guineas), L'Attrayante (Poule d'Essai des Pouliches), Horage and Crystal Glitters. On his final appearance, L'Emigrant was sent to the United States and moved up in distance for the Man o' War Stakes over eleven furlongs at Belmont Park. He made the running for a mile, but faded in the straight and finished third behind Majesty's Prince and Erin's Isle.

== Assessment ==
In the official International Classification for 1982, L'Emigrant was rated the seventh-best two-year-old in Europe. The independent Timeform organisation gave him a rating of 125, eight pounds below their top-rated two-year-old Diesis. In 1983 the International Classification rated L'Emigrant the best three-year-old colt in France, the third best three-year-old colt in Europe behind Shareef Dancer and Caerleon and the fifth best horse of any age. Timeform gave him a rating of 129, seven pounds behind their highest-rated horse Habibti.

== Stud record ==
L'Emigrant was retired from racing to become a breeding stallion at the Gainesway Farm with a valuation of $13 million. He was not a success at stud, but sired a few good winners including Mary Linoa (Prix Marcel Boussac) and Summer Trip (Prix de Royallieu). One of his sons, Grey Duster became a successful competitor in equestrian competitions in China, winning an event at the National Games in 2001. His last recorded foals were born in 1995.

== Pedigree ==
Pedigree of L'Emigrant (USA), bay or brown stallion, 1980
Sire The Minstrel (CAN) 1974	Northern Dancer (CAN); 1961	Nearctic	Nearco
Sire The Minstrel (CAN) 1974	Northern Dancer (CAN); 1961	Nearctic	Lady Angela
Sire The Minstrel (CAN) 1974	Northern Dancer (CAN); 1961	Natalma	Native Dancer
Sire The Minstrel (CAN) 1974	Northern Dancer (CAN); 1961	Natalma	Almahmoud
Sire The Minstrel (CAN) 1974	Fleur (CAN); 1964	Victoria Park	Chop Chop
Sire The Minstrel (CAN) 1974	Fleur (CAN); 1964	Victoria Park	Victoriana
Sire The Minstrel (CAN) 1974	Fleur (CAN); 1964	Flaming Page	Bull Page
Sire The Minstrel (CAN) 1974	Fleur (CAN); 1964	Flaming Page	Flaring Top
Dam Suprina (USA) 1970	Vaguely Noble (IRE); 1965	Vienna	Aureole
Dam Suprina (USA) 1970	Vaguely Noble (IRE); 1965	Vienna	Turkish Blood
Dam Suprina (USA) 1970	Vaguely Noble (IRE); 1965	Noble Lassie	Nearco
Dam Suprina (USA) 1970	Vaguely Noble (IRE); 1965	Noble Lassie	Belle Sauvage
Dam Suprina (USA) 1970	Perfecta (USA); 1965	Swaps	Khaled
Dam Suprina (USA) 1970	Perfecta (USA); 1965	Swaps	Iron Reward
Dam Suprina (USA) 1970	Perfecta (USA); 1965	Cosmah	Cosmic Bomb
Dam Suprina (USA) 1970	Perfecta (USA); 1965	Cosmah	Almahmoud (Family:2-d)
