= Musical Bliss =

American-bred Thoroughbred racehorse

- Sire: The Minstrel
- Grandsire: Northern Dancer
- Dam: Bori
- Damsire: Quadrangle
- Sex: Mare
- Foaled: 25 February 1986
- Country: United States
- Colour: Bay
- Breeder: Sterlingbrook Farm
- Owner: Sheikh Mohammed
- Trainer: Michael Stoute
- Record: 5: 3-0-0
- Earnings: £123,178

Major wins
- Rockfel Stakes (1988); 1000 Guineas (1989)
- Last updated on 17 September 2025

Musical Bliss (1986–2006) was an American-bred, British-trained Thoroughbred racehorse and broodmare who won the Classic 1000 Guineas in 1989. In a racing career lasting from July 1988 until August 1989, the filly ran five times and won three races. In 1988, Musical Bliss won both her races, including the Rockfel Stakes at Newmarket Racecourse. On her first appearance as a three-year-old, she won the 1000 Guineas but ran poorly in her two other races and was retired from racing at the end of the year. Her record as a broodmare was mixed.

== Background ==
Musical Bliss was a bay mare with a white blaze and a white sock on her left hind leg, bred in the United States by Sterlingbrook Farm. She was sired by The Minstrel, a Canadian-bred horse who won The Derby in 1977. As a breeding stallion, The Minstrel sired Bakharoff, Minstrella, Opening Verse, L'Emigrant and Palace Music.

Musical Bliss was sent as a yearling to the Keeneland sales where she was bought by Sheikh Mohammed. The filly was sent to England to be trained by Michael Stoute at Newmarket, Suffolk and was ridden in four of her five races by Walter Swinburn.

== Racing career ==
=== 1988: two-year-old season ===
Musical Bliss made her first appearance in a six furlong maiden race at Ascot in July 1988. She started the 8/11 favourite and won by four lengths from Command Performer. The filly was off the racecourse for almost three months before her second and final start of the year, when she was moved up in class to contest the Group Three Rockfel Stakes at Newmarket. She started slowly, but took the lead inside the final furlong and won by two lengths from Jaljuli.

=== 1989: three-year-old season ===
Musical Bliss made her first appearance as a three-year-old in the 1000 Guineas over the Rowley Mile at Newmarket on 4 May. She started at odds of 7/2 in a field of seven fillies, the smallest number of runners since 1904. The other leading contenders were the Nell Gwyn Stakes winner Ensconse, who started 7/4 favourite and the Cheveley Park Stakes winner Pass The Peace. Swinburn sent Musical Bliss into the lead from the start and set a steady pace before quickening inside the last quarter of a mile. In the closing stages she was challenged by her stable companion Kerrera, but held on to win by a length, with Aldbourne beating Ensconse in a photo-finish for third. The win gave Michael Stoute his first winner of the race, after training the runner-up on six occasions.

A month later, Musical Bliss was moved up in distance and started 4/1 second favourite for the Gold Seal Oaks over one and a half miles at Epsom. She was ridden by Michael Roberts, after Walter Swinburn elected to ride Stoute's other runner Aliysa, and his replacement Greville Starkey was claimed by his stable to ride a 40/1 outsider. Musical Bliss was never able to challenge the leaders and tired in the closing stages to finish seventh of the nine runners, more than ten lengths behind Aliysa, who won comfortably. The winner was subsequently disqualified after a post-race test revealed traces of a banned substance.

On her only other racecourse appearance, Musical Bliss was matched against colts and older horses in the Prix Jacques Le Marois at Deauville Racecourse. She was never a factor in the race and finished eighth of the ten runners behind Polish Precedent.

== Retirement ==
Musical Bliss was retired to become a broodmare for her owner's Darley Stud. She produced at least nine foals and four winners. The most successful of her progeny was the filly Muscadel, which won the Listed Prix Liancourt at Longchamp in 1997. Musical Bliss died in 2006.

== Stud record ==
- 1994 Muscadel (GB) : Bay filly, foaled 1 January, by Nashwan (USA) – won 2 races including LR Prix de Liancourt, Longchamp from 4 starts in France 1997
- 1998 Raneem (USA) : Bay colt, foaled 13 February, by Gone West (USA) – won 3 minor races in France and Dubai 2000–2003
- 2003 Festival Hall (USA) : Brown gelding, by Gone West (USA)

== Assessment and honours ==
In their book, A Century of Champions, based on the Timeform rating system, John Randall and Tony Morris rated Musical Bliss an "inferior" winner of the 1000 Guineas.

== Pedigree ==
Pedigree of Musical Bliss (USA), bay mare, 1986
Sire The Minstrel (CAN) 1974	Northern Dancer; 1961	Nearctic	Nearco
Sire The Minstrel (CAN) 1974	Northern Dancer; 1961	Nearctic	Lady Angela
Sire The Minstrel (CAN) 1974	Northern Dancer; 1961	Natalma	Native Dancer
Sire The Minstrel (CAN) 1974	Northern Dancer; 1961	Natalma	Almahmoud
Sire The Minstrel (CAN) 1974	Fleur; 1964	Victoria Park	Chop Chop
Sire The Minstrel (CAN) 1974	Fleur; 1964	Victoria Park	Victoriana
Sire The Minstrel (CAN) 1974	Fleur; 1964	Flaming Page	Bull Page
Sire The Minstrel (CAN) 1974	Fleur; 1964	Flaming Page	Flaring Top
Dam Bori (USA) 1972	Quadrangle; 1961	Cohoes	Mahmoud
Dam Bori (USA) 1972	Quadrangle; 1961	Cohoes	Belle of Troy
Dam Bori (USA) 1972	Quadrangle; 1961	Tap Day	Bull Lea
Dam Bori (USA) 1972	Quadrangle; 1961	Tap Day	Scurry
Dam Bori (USA) 1972	Lucretia Bori; 1965	Bold Ruler	Nasrullah
Dam Bori (USA) 1972	Lucretia Bori; 1965	Bold Ruler	Miss Disco
Dam Bori (USA) 1972	Lucretia Bori; 1965	Arietta	Tudor Minstrel
Dam Bori (USA) 1972	Lucretia Bori; 1965	Arietta	Anne of Essex (Family:2-i)
