= Forest Flower (horse) =

American-bred Thoroughbred racehorse

- Racing silks of Paul Mellon
- Sire: Green Forest
- Grandsire: Shecky Greene
- Dam: Leap Lively
- Damsire: Nijinsky
- Sex: Mare
- Foaled: 9 February 1984
- Died: 10 February 2011 (Aged 27)
- Country: United States
- Colour: Chestnut
- Breeder: Paul Mellon
- Owner: Paul Mellon
- Trainer: Ian Balding
- Record: 8: 5-1-0

Major wins
- Queen Mary Stakes (1986); Cherry Hinton Stakes (1986); Mill Reef Stakes (1986); Irish 1,000 Guineas (1987)

Awards
- Timeform best two-year-old filly (1986); Top-rated European two-year-old filly (1986); Timeform rating: 127 (1986, 1987)

Forest Flower (9 February 1984 – 10 February 2011) was an American-bred, British-trained Thoroughbred racehorse and broodmare. In a racing career which lasted from May 1986 until July 1987 she won five of her eight races. She was the outstanding European two-year-old filly of 1986 when she won the Queen Mary Stakes, Cherry Hinton Stakes and Mill Reef Stakes before being controversially disqualified after finishing first in the Cheveley Park Stakes. Her subsequent career was disrupted by poor health, but she won the Irish 1,000 Guineas in 1987. She was retired to stud in 1988 and had limited success as a broodmare before dying in 2011 at the age of twenty-seven.

== Background ==
Forest Flower was a chestnut mare with a white blaze bred in Virginia by her owner Paul Mellon. She was an unusually small Thoroughbred standing 14.3 hands high. Forest Flower was one of the first crop of foals sired by Green Forest, a Kentucky-bred, French-trained horse whose wins included the Prix Morny, Grand Critérium, Prix de la Salamandre and Prix du Moulin. Her dam Leap Lively, also bred and owned by Mellon, won the Fillies' Mile in 1980 and finished third to Blue Wind in the following year's Epsom Oaks. Leap Lively also produced Scoop the Gold, the dam of the Blue Grass Stakes winner High Yield.

Forest Flower was sent to race in England where she was trained by Ian Balding at Kingsclere.

== Racing career ==
=== 1986: two-year-old season ===
Forest Flower began her racing career by winning a race over five furlongs at Newbury Racecourse in May. She was then moved up in class for the Group Three Queen Mary Stakes at Royal Ascot on June. She started the 9/4 joint-favourite in a field of thirteen fillies and "sprinted clear" to win impressively by three lengths. In July she was required to carry two pounds more than the Minstrella, who had won the Chesham Stakes at Royal Ascot, in the Cherry Hinton Stakes over six furlongs at Newmarket Racecourse. Ridden by Tony Ives, Forest Flower was headed by the Irish filly, but fought back to win by three-quarters of a length, with the first two pulling seven lengths clear of the other runners. Forest Flower and Minstrella met again, this time at level weights, in the Group One Phoenix Stakes at Phoenix Park Racecourse in August. Ridden by Pat Eddery, Forest Flower finished strongly, but failed to overtake her rival and was beaten a short head.

After a six-week break, Forest Flower ran in the Group Two Mill Reef Stakes (a race named after her owner's most famous horse) at Newbury. Ridden by Ives, she started the 4/7 favourite against eight colts and became the first filly to win the race, beating Shady Heights comfortably by half a length. Forest Flower's final race of the season saw her face Minstrella for the third time in the Group One Cheveley Park Stakes at Newmarket on 1 October. The race proved to be a highly controversial one. Forest Flower seemed to be boxed in two furlongs from the finish, and Ives, in extricating the filly from her unfavourable position, bumped into Minstrella, hampering the other filly. Having obtained a clear run, Forest Flower quickly took the lead and won convincingly by two and a half lengths from Minstrella. John Reid, the rider of Minstrella, immediately lodged an objection, but the racecourse stewards ruled that the interference had been accidental and left the result unaltered. Minstrella's connections then took their case to the disciplinary committee of the Jockey Club, who overturned the original decision, ruling that the interference had been intentional. Forest Flower was disqualified and place last, while Ives was given a twelve-day riding ban. Timeform described the decision as "inequitable" and "unjust", but pointed out that the committee had acted correctly according to the rules of racing.

=== 1987: three-year-old season ===
Despite doubts that such a small filly would progress from two to three, Forest Flower's targets for 1987 included the 1000 Guineas, the Prix de Diane and The Derby. It was intended that she would begin her three-year-old season in the Fred Darling Stakes at Newbury in April, but she was withdrawn from the race on account of the soft ground. She then ran very poorly in a racecourse gallop at Bath and was withdrawn from the 1000 Guineas. It was subsequently discovered that she had been suffering from a viral infection. Forest Flower made a belated seasonal debut in the Irish 1000 Guineas at the Curragh on 23 May. She started second favourite at odds of 4/1 behind Milligram, who had finished second to Miesque in the 1000 Guineas. After a slow early pace, at least ten of the runners were still in contention two furlongs from the finish, but Forest Flower produced the best finish, "battling on gamely" to catch Milligram in the final strides to win by a short head.

After her win at the Curragh, Forest Flower suffered a recurrence of her health problems and missed a rematch with Milligram at Royal Ascot after she was found to be running a temperature. She reappeared at Newmarket in July, when she was matched against Sonic Lady, the outstanding British miler of 1986 in the Child Stakes. Forest Flower was strongly fancied for the race, but was struggling after four furlongs and finished tailed-off last of the four runners. The filly remained in training for the rest of the year, and into 1988, but Balding was unable to bring her back to full fitness and she never raced again. Her retirement was announced in August 1988 after she was reported to be suffering from "internal bleeding".

== Assessment ==
Forest Flower was rated the best of an unusually strong group of juvenile fillies in 1986. Timeform rated her on 127, ahead of Miesque (124), Milligram (122) and Minstrella (121). They described her as "indomitable of spirit and wonderfully game and genuine". The official International Classification she was also rated the best filly, two pounds ahead of Miesque, and two pounds behind the top colt Reference Point.

Despite her restricted campaign in 1987, Forest Flower was again rated 127 by Timeform and was the fifth-highest three-year-old filly in the International Classification behind Miesque, Indian Skimmer, Milligram and Unite.

In their book, A Century of Champions, based on the Timeform rating system, John Randall and Tony Morris rated Forest Flower the nineteenth best British or Irish two-year-old filly of the 20th century.

== Stud record ==
Forest Flower was retired from racing to become a broodmare for her owner's stud. In 1992 she was sold for $671,000 to Betty Moran and moved to her new owner's Brushwood Farm in Pennsylvania. She had modest success as a broodmare, producing at least three minor winners from seven known foals:

- Hill of Dreams (bay colt, foaled 1990, sired by Shirley Heights), won four races
- Hertford Castle (bay filly, foaled 1991, sired by Reference Point), great grandam of Night of Thunder
- Flaming Feather (bay colt, foaled 1993, sired by Shirley Heights), won one race
- Flower Arch (chestnut filly, foaled 1994, sired by Nashwan)
- Al Naba (chestnut colt, foaled 1996, sired by Mr. Prospector), won two races
- Eishin Dunkirk (chestnut colt, foaled 1997, sired by Mr. Prospector)
- Paulette (bay filly, foaled 1999, sired by Deputy Minister)

Forest Flower was retired from breeding in 2002 and was euthanised at Brushwood Farm on 10 February 2011 at the age of twenty-seven.

== Pedigree ==
Pedigree of Forest Flower, chestnut mare, 1984
Sire Green Forest (USA) 1979	Shecky Greene (USA); 1970	Noholme	Star Kingdom
Sire Green Forest (USA) 1979	Shecky Greene (USA); 1970	Noholme	Oceana
Sire Green Forest (USA) 1979	Shecky Greene (USA); 1970	Lester's Pride	Model Cadet
Sire Green Forest (USA) 1979	Shecky Greene (USA); 1970	Lester's Pride	Meadow Flower
Sire Green Forest (USA) 1979	Tell Meno Lies (USA); 1971	The Axe	Mahmoud
Sire Green Forest (USA) 1979	Tell Meno Lies (USA); 1971	The Axe	Blackball
Sire Green Forest (USA) 1979	Tell Meno Lies (USA); 1971	Filatonga	Count of Honour
Sire Green Forest (USA) 1979	Tell Meno Lies (USA); 1971	Filatonga	Blarney Castle
Dam Leap Lively (USA) 1978	Nijinsky (CAN); 1967	Northern Dancer	Nearctic
Dam Leap Lively (USA) 1978	Nijinsky (CAN); 1967	Northern Dancer	Natalma
Dam Leap Lively (USA) 1978	Nijinsky (CAN); 1967	Flaming Page	Bull Page
Dam Leap Lively (USA) 1978	Nijinsky (CAN); 1967	Flaming Page	Flaring Top
Dam Leap Lively (USA) 1978	Quilloquick (USA); 1969	Graustark	Ribot
Dam Leap Lively (USA) 1978	Quilloquick (USA); 1969	Graustark	Flower Bowl
Dam Leap Lively (USA) 1978	Quilloquick (USA); 1969	Quillobelle	Princequillo
Dam Leap Lively (USA) 1978	Quilloquick (USA); 1969	Quillobelle	Bellesoeur (Family:2-n)
