= Colstar =

American Thoroughbred racehorse

- Sire: Opening Verse
- Grandsire: The Minstrel
- Dam: Ascend
- Damsire: Risen Star
- Sex: Filly
- Foaled: 1996
- Country: United States
- Colour: Bay
- Breeder: Beverley R. Steinman
- Owner: Beverley R. Steinman
- Record: 18: 11-2-1
- Earnings: $1,053,056

Major wins
- Martha Washington Stakes (1999); Gallorette Handicap (2000); Flower Bowl Invitational Stakes (2000); Locust Grove Handicap (2000, 2001); All Along Stakes (2001)
- Last updated on October 8, 2007

Colstar (foaled 1996 in Kentucky) is an American Thoroughbred racehorse and broodmare. Sired by the 1991 Breeders' Cup Mile winner, Opening Verse, she was out of the mare Ascend, a daughter of Preakness and Belmont Stakes winner, Risen Star.

Racing in Maryland, Colstar's first important win came in 1999, in the Grade III Martha Washington Stakes, following by a win the next year in the Gallorette Handicap. Her other racing successes includes back-to-back wins in the Locust Grove Handicap at Churchill Downs and the Grade I Flower Bowl Invitational Stakes at Belmont Park.

Retired to broodmare duty, Colstar has produced four unraced offspring to date.
