= Naturalism (horse) =

New Zealand–bred Thoroughbred racehorse

- Sire: Palace Music
- Grandsire: The Minstrel
- Dam: Zephyr Souba
- Damsire: Zephyr Bay
- Sex: Stallion
- Foaled: 19 October 1988
- Died: 13 July 2018 (aged 29)
- Country: New Zealand
- Colour: Bay
- Owner: S. P. & K. M. Silk, J. W. Collins, D B Dimattina, D. M. Tricarico & C. P. Koch
- Trainer: Lee Freedman
- Record: 34: 12–9-3
- Earnings: A$3,285,626

Major wins
- BMW Vase (1991); Alister Clark Stakes (1992); Australian Derby (1992); J. F. Feehan Stakes (1992); Memsie Stakes (1992); Rosehill Guineas (1992); Turnbull Stakes (1992); Apollo Stakes (1993); Canterbury Cup (1993); Caulfield Stakes (1993)

Honours
- Naturalism Stakes at Caulfield Racecourse
- Last updated on 26 February 2026

Naturalism (19 October 1988 – 13 July 2018) was a New Zealand–bred Australian-trained thoroughbred racehorse.

== Background ==
Foaled in New Zealand on 19 October 1988, Naturalism was a bay stallion sired by Palace Music, a Kentucky-bred, French-trained racehorse who won the Champion Stakes in 1984. At stud, Palace Music (Naturalism's sire) was best known as the sire of the American champion Cigar. Naturalism was purchased as a yearling for A$35,000 by Anthony Freedman.

== Racing career ==
Naturalism's wins included three Group One races.

According to the Freedman brothers website, Lee Freedman rated Naturalism as one of the five best horses he ever trained. The website also says that "Probably his greatest performance was his second in the Japan Cup, as he wasn't really a 2400m horse."

Naturalism died at Meringo Stud, New South Wales, Australia, on 13 July 2018.

== Pedigree ==
Pedigree of Naturalism
| Sire Palace Music ch. 1981 | The MInstrel ch. 1974 | Northern Dancer | Nearctic |
| Sire Palace Music ch. 1981 | The MInstrel ch. 1974 | Northern Dancer | Natalma |
| Sire Palace Music ch. 1981 | The MInstrel ch. 1974 | Fleur | Victoria Park |
| Sire Palace Music ch. 1981 | The MInstrel ch. 1974 | Fleur | Flaming Page |
| Sire Palace Music ch. 1981 | Come My Prince gr. 1972 | Prince John | Princequillo |
| Sire Palace Music ch. 1981 | Come My Prince gr. 1972 | Prince John | Not Araid |
| Sire Palace Music ch. 1981 | Come My Prince gr. 1972 | Come Hither Look | Turn-to |
| Sire Palace Music ch. 1981 | Come My Prince gr. 1972 | Come Hither Look | Mumtaz |
| Dam Zephyr Souba b. 1979 | Zephyr Bay dk.b. 1970 | Biscay | Star Kingdom |
| Dam Zephyr Souba b. 1979 | Zephyr Bay dk.b. 1970 | Biscay | Magic Symbol |
| Dam Zephyr Souba b. 1979 | Zephyr Bay dk.b. 1970 | Heavenly Wind | Pan |
| Dam Zephyr Souba b. 1979 | Zephyr Bay dk.b. 1970 | Heavenly Wind | Perilla |
| Dam Zephyr Souba b. 1979 | Souba b. 1970 | Taine | Vandale |
| Dam Zephyr Souba b. 1979 | Souba b. 1970 | Taine | Tauchere |
| Dam Zephyr Souba b. 1979 | Souba b. 1970 | Serge de Nimes | Arctic Prince |
| Dam Zephyr Souba b. 1979 | Souba b. 1970 | Serge de Nimes | Blue Denim |
