= Melodist =

A melodist is a composer of melodies

A melodist may also refer to:

- Melodist (horse), (1985–1999) an American-bred, British-trained Thoroughbred racehorse and broodmare
- Cosmas the Melodist (died 773/794), a bishop and hymnographer
- Romanos the Melodist (5th-century – after 555), a Byzantine hymnographer and composer
