= Evening Peal =

Australian-bred Thoroughbred racehorse

- Sire: Delville Wood (GB)
- Grandsire: Bois Roussel (FR)
- Dam: Mission Chimes (AUS)
- Damsire: Le Grand Duc (FR)
- Sex: Mare
- Foaled: 1952
- Died: 1977
- Country: Australia
- Colour: Brown
- Owner: Mr & Mrs R White
- Trainer: Peter Lawson
- Jockey: George Podmore
- Record: 51:11 wins
- Earnings: A£30,744

Major wins
- Wakeful Stakes (1955; VRC Oaks (1955); QTC Oaks (1955); AJC Oaks (1956); Melbourne Cup (1956); Frederick Clissold Stakes (1956); Canterbury Cup (1957)
- Last updated on 30 December 2012

Evening Peal (1952–1977) was a notable Australian thoroughbred racehorse who won the 1956 Melbourne Cup, being ridden by George Podmore.

Having run second in the Caulfield Cup to the New Zealand champion Redcraze she was sent out a 15/1 chance. With a massive weight advantage she hung on to win the race from the fast finishing Redcraze by a half-neck.

In winning the Cup she became just the seventh mare to win the race. She carried 8 stone (approximately 51 kg) in the race, more weight than any mare had previously won with.

Her winning time of 3 minutes 19.5 seconds equalled the race record held by Comic Court.
