= Ravinella =

American-bred Thoroughbred racehorse

- Sire: Mr Prospector
- Grandsire: Raise A Native
- Dam: Really Lucky
- Damsire: Northern Dancer
- Sex: Mare
- Foaled: 11 March 1985
- Country: United States
- Colour: Bay
- Breeder: Ecurie Aland
- Owner: Ecurie Aland; Allen Paulson
- Trainer: Criquette Head; Richard Lundy

Major wins
- Prix d'Arenberg (1987); Cheveley Park Stakes (1987); Prix Imprudence (1988); 1000 Guineas (1988); Poule d'Essai des Pouliches (1988); All Along Stakes (1988)

Awards
- Top-rated European two-year-old (1987); Timeform top-rated two-year-old filly (1987)

Ravinella (11 March 1985 – 16 May 1992) was an American-bred, French-trained Thoroughbred racehorse and broodmare, best known for being the outstanding European filly of her generation in 1987 and for winning the classic 1000 Guineas in 1988.

== Background ==
Ravinella was a dark bay or brown filly sired by Mr Prospector out of Really Lucky, a stakes-winning daughter of Northern Dancer. She was bred in Kentucky by the Head family's Ecurie Aland and sent to race in Europe where she was trained by Criquette Head at Chantilly.

== Racing career ==
=== 1987: two-year-old season ===
Ravinella made her racecourse debut in the Prix de Lisieux over 1300 metres at Deauville Racecourse in August. She was restrained in the early stages before winning by two lengths to emulate Miesque who had won the race in 1986. Ravinella recorded her first significant success in September when she won the Group Three Prix d'Arenberg over 1,100 metres at Chantilly Racecourse. In October Ravinella was sent to Newmarket for the Cheveley Park Stakes, Britain's premier event for two-year-old fillies. Ridden by Gary Moore, she won from the Prix Morny winner First Waltz and the Lowther Stakes winner Ela Romara. At the end of the year she was rated the best two-year-old filly in Europe on both the official International Classification and the independent Timeform ratings.

=== 1988: three-year-old season ===
Ravinella began her three-year-old season by winning the Prix Imprudence over 1400 metres at Maisons-Laffitte Racecourse. The filly was then sent back to England to contest the 1000 Guineas over Newmarket's Rowley Mile course on 28 April. Ridden by Moore, she started the 4/5 favourite against eleven opponents. She took the lead inside the final furlong and won by one and a half lengths from Dabaweyaa, with Diminuendo a further length and a half lengths back in third. Nineteen days later at Longchamp Racecourse became the third filly after Imprudence in 1947 and Miesque in 1987 to win the Poule d'Essai des Pouliches after winning the 1000 Guineas as she defeated Duckling Park by a neck in a blanket finish.

Ravinella returned to England in June for the Coronation Stakes at Royal Ascot. She started the 4/6 favourite but finished third beaten six lengths by the winner Magic of Life. In October she was dropped in class for the Group Three Prix du Rond-Point at Longchamp in which she was matched against colts and older horses. She finished fourth of the twelve runners behind her stable companion In Extremis. On her final start of the season, she was sent to the United States to contest the Breeders' Cup Mile at Churchill Downs. She came home seventh behind Miesque but did finish ahead of several notable horses including Bet Twice, Warning and Blushing John.

At the end of the season, Ravinella was sold for $2.6 million to Allen Paulson and exported to race in North America.

=== 1989: four-year-old season ===
In 1989 Ravinella raced in the United States with mixed results. In April she won the Hialeah Breeders' Cup Handicap at Hialeah Park Race Track, beating the favoured Love You by Heart by three lengths. She was also placed in the Gamely Handicap, the Black Helen Handicap and the Matchmaker Stakes.

== Assessment ==
As noted above, Ravinella was rated the best two-year-old filly in Europe in 1987, level with the top colt Warning on a rating of 125. The independent Timeform organisation were not quite so impressed, rating her six pounds below Warning on 121p but still making her the best juvenile filly of the year. In 1988 she was the top rated European three-year-old filly in the 1,400 – 1,900 metre division.

In their book A Century of Champions, based on a modified version of the Timeform system John Randall and Tony Morris rated Ravinella a "poor" winner of the 1000 Guineas.

Ravinella produced only one registered foal: Bodleian (1991) a bay colt sired by Reference Point. Bodleian was unraced, and there are no other breeding records for Ravinella.

== Pedigree ==
Pedigree of Ravinella (USA), bay mare, 1985
Sire Mr Prospector (USA) 1970	Raise A Native (USA); 1961	Native Dancer	Polynesian
Sire Mr Prospector (USA) 1970	Raise A Native (USA); 1961	Native Dancer	Geisha
Sire Mr Prospector (USA) 1970	Raise A Native (USA); 1961	Raise You	Case Ace
Sire Mr Prospector (USA) 1970	Raise A Native (USA); 1961	Raise You	Lady Glory
Sire Mr Prospector (USA) 1970	Gold Digger (USA); 1962	Nashua	Nasrullah
Sire Mr Prospector (USA) 1970	Gold Digger (USA); 1962	Nashua	Segula
Sire Mr Prospector (USA) 1970	Gold Digger (USA); 1962	Sequence	Count Fleet
Sire Mr Prospector (USA) 1970	Gold Digger (USA); 1962	Sequence	Miss Dogwood
Dam Really Lucky (USA) 1978	Northern Dancer (USA); 1961	Nearctic	Nearco
Dam Really Lucky (USA) 1978	Northern Dancer (USA); 1961	Nearctic	Lady Angela
Dam Really Lucky (USA) 1978	Northern Dancer (USA); 1961	Natalma	Native Dancer
Dam Really Lucky (USA) 1978	Northern Dancer (USA); 1961	Natalma	Almahmoud
Dam Really Lucky (USA) 1978	Realty (USA); 1972	Sir Ivor	Sir Gaylord
Dam Really Lucky (USA) 1978	Realty (USA); 1972	Sir Ivor	Attica
Dam Really Lucky (USA) 1978	Realty (USA); 1972	Reveille	Star Kingdom
Dam Really Lucky (USA) 1978	Realty (USA); 1972	Reveille	Emulation (Family 1-n)
