= George Podmore =

Australian jockey

George Podmore (1925 − 10 July 2005) was an Australian jockey who was best known for riding Evening Peal to victory in the 1956 Melbourne Cup. His career spanned for four decades.

Podmore was born in 1925 in Sydney, New South Wales.

Podmore died following a long illness on 10 July 2005, aged 79, at a hospital on the Gold Coast in Queensland. He was survived by his wife of 55 years, Margaret, three children and five grandchildren.
