= Randwick City Stakes =

- Class: Listed
- Location: Randwick Racecourse, Sydney, Australia
- Inaugurated: 1947
- Race type: Thoroughbred - flat

Race information
- Distance: 2,000 metres
- Surface: Turf
- Track: Right-handed
- Qualification: Three - years and older
- Weight: Set weights with penalties
- Purse: A$160,000 (2023)

The Randwick City Stakes is an AJC Listed Australian Thoroughbred open quality handicap horse race for horses three years old and older, over a distance of 2000 metres. It is held annually at Randwick Racecourse in Sydney in March.

== History ==
Prior to 2006 the race was known as the Canterbury Cup and run at Canterbury Park Racecourse.

== The winners ==
- 1947 - Air Flare
- 1948 - Wellington
- 1949 - Silent
- 1950 - Chitral
- 1951 - Bankstream
- 1952 - All Jeep
- 1953 - Great World
- 1954 - Royal Stream
- 1955 - Shadford
- 1956 - Compound
- 1957 - Evening Peal
- 1958 - Waterford
- 1959 - Half Hennessy
- 1960 - Dare Say
- 1961 - Johnno
- 1962 - Nidebra
- 1963 - Kamikaze
- 1964 - Royal Emblem
- 1965 - Rakaia
- 1966 - Versailles
- 1967 - Brigade
- 1968 - Prince Judea
- 1969 - Oromedes
- 1970 - Royal Parma
- 1971 - Paris Girl
- 1972 - True Pal
- 1973 - Analie
- 1974 - French Cavalier
- 1975 - Gay Bonnie
- 1976 - Future Shock
- 1977 - Ready O'ready
- 1978 - Ready O'ready
- 1979 - Happy Union
- 1980 - Pigalle
- 1981 - Vivacite
- 1982 - Bianco Lady
- 1983 - Lost Valley
- 1984 - Lord Paddington
- 1985 - Late Show
- 1986 - Nimble Touch
- 1987 - Commercial Balance
- 1988 - Cosmic Kingdom
- 1989 - Noble Clubs
- 1990 - Yarra Bay
- 1991 - Estimable
- 1992 - Just Tommy
- 1993 - Naturalism
- 1994 - Air Seattle
- 1995 - Sovereign Kite
- 1996 - Electronic
- 1997 - Hula Flight
- 1998 - Waikikamukau
- 1999 - Red Ivory
- 2000 - Edward Brae
- 2001 - Steel Phoenix
- 2002 - Kaapgun
- 2003 - Bedouin
- 2004 - Zabarra
- 2005 - Winning Belle
- 2006 - Dizelle
- 2007 - Spirit Of Tara
- 2008 - No Wine No Song
- 2009 - Newport
- 2010 - The Embassy
- 2011 - Saint Encosta
- 2012 - Maules Creek
- 2013 - Tremec
- 2014 - Junoob
- 2015 - Phrases
- 2016 - Libran
- 2017 - Astronomos
- 2018 - Emperors Way
- 2019 - Hiyaam
- 2020 - Shared Ambition
- 2021 - Mount Popa
- 2022 - Zeyrek
- 2023 - Sir Lucan
- 2024 - Serpentine
- 2025 - Alalcance

== See also ==
- List of Australian Group races
- Group races
