= The Minstrel =

Canadian-bred Thoroughbred racehorse (1974-1990)

- Racing silks of Robert Sangster
- Sire: Northern Dancer
- Grandsire: Nearctic
- Dam: Fleur (USA)
- Damsire: Victoria Park
- Sex: Stallion
- Foaled: 11 March 1974
- Country: Canada
- Colour: Chestnut
- Breeder: Windfields Farm
- Owner: Robert Sangster
- Trainer: Vincent O'Brien
- Record: 9: 7-1-1
- Earnings: £333,197 ($570,605)

Major wins
- Dewhurst Stakes (1976); 2,000 Guineas Trial Stakes (1977); Epsom Derby (1977); Irish Derby (1977); K. George VI & Q. Elizabeth Stakes (1977)

Awards
- Horse of the Year in the United Kingdom (1977); Horse of the Year in Ireland (1977); Timeform rating: 135

Honours
- Canadian Horse Racing Hall of Fame (1979); Minstrel Stakes at the Curragh
- Last updated on 3 May 2011

The Minstrel (11 March 1974 – 3 September 1990) was a Canadian-bred, Irish-trained Thoroughbred racehorse and sire. Bred in Ontario, he was sold as a yearling and exported to Europe, where he was campaigned in Ireland and the United Kingdom. As a two-year-old The Minstrel was unbeaten in three races, including the Dewhurst Stakes, but lost two of his first three starts in 1977. He was then moved up in distance and won his remaining three races: the Epsom Derby, the Irish Derby and the King George VI and Queen Elizabeth Stakes.

These performances led to The Minstrel becoming horse of the year in the UK and later being inducted into the Canadian Horse Racing Hall of Fame. The Minstrel spent his stud career in the United States, where he had considerable success as a sire of winners.

== Background ==
The Minstrel, a "stocky" chestnut colt with a white blaze, four white stockings and a gentle disposition, was foaled at E. P. Taylor's Windfields Farm in Oshawa, Ontario, Canada. He was the son of Northern Dancer out of Fleur, a daughter of Victoria Park. The horse was a three-quarter-brother to the 1970 English Triple Crown champion Nijinsky (who was by Northern Dancer out of Flaming Page, the dam of Fleur).

The Minstrel was purchased for $200,000 ($1.2 million inflation adjusted) at the 1975 Keeneland Sales yearling auction by the British Bloodstock Agency (based in Ireland), acting on behalf of a group headed by Robert Sangster (1936–2004). The colt was shipped to Ireland under trainer Vincent O'Brien and ridden by champion jockey Lester Piggott.

== Racing career ==
=== 1976: two-year-old season ===
As a two-year-old, The Minstrel won the six furlong Moy Stakes at the Curragh on his debut and then moved up in class to win the Group Three Larkspur Stakes over seven furlongs at Leopardstown. In October he was sent to England to contest the Dewhurst Stakes at Newmarket. Ridden by Piggott, he started 6/5 favourite against ten opponents and won by four lengths from Saros. In the Free Handicap, a rating of the best two-year-olds to race in Britain, he was given a rating of 123 pounds, eight pounds below the top-rated J O Tobin.

=== 1977: three-year-old season ===
In the spring of 1977, The Minstrel was campaigned over one mile. He won the 2000 Guineas Trial on heavy ground at Ascot Racecourse on 2 April. Four weeks later, he started 6/5 favourite for The 2000 Guineas Stakes but after recovering from a poor start he appeared to be beaten for speed in the closing stages as he finished third of the eighteen runners behind Nebbiolo and Tachypous. In the Irish 2000 Guineas at the Curragh on 14 May he finished strongly to reverse the form with Nebbiolo but was beaten a short head by Pampapaul. Despite two classic defeats, Piggott retained his belief in the colt and told O'Brien and Sangster that "If you run The Minstrel in the Derby, I'll ride him."

The Minstrel was then moved up in distance to contest the 198th running of the Derby over one and a half miles at Epsom Downs Racecourse. Ridden as usual by Piggott, he started at odds of 5/1 in a field of twenty-two runners, with the French-trained Blushing Groom being made 9/4 favourite. Vincent O'Brien, as usual, left nothing to chance, stuffing cotton wool in the horse's ears until he got to the start – the first recorded example of this calming influence being used. The Minstrel was not among the early leaders but moved forward to take third place at the turn into the straight. Approaching the final quarter mile he moved up to challenge the leader Hot Grove, ridden by Willie Carson. The two colts raced side by side throughout the closing stages before The Minstrel gained the advantage in the last strides and prevailed by neck. Blushing Groom was five length further back in third. The Minstrel's success was a fifth in the race for Vincent O'Brien and a record eighth for Piggott. At the end of the month The Minstrel followed up with a win in the Irish Derby at the Curragh, beating Lucky Sovereign by one and a half lengths and surviving an objection by the rider of the runner-up.

In July The Minstrel raced against older horses for the first time in Britain's most prestigious all-aged race, the King George VI and Queen Elizabeth Stakes over one and a half miles at Ascot. The race attracted a strong international field including Bruni, Exceller, Crystal Palace (Prix du Jockey Club) and Crow (St Leger). Piggott settled the colt in the middle of the field before moving up on the outside in the straight to challenge for the lead. He caught the British-trained five-year-old Orange Bay inside the final furlong and held on by a short head in a photo finish as Orange Bay rallied strongly.

In August a half-share in the colt was sold back to his breeder for $4,500,000. The threat of import restrictions following an outbreak of metritis in Europe led to The Minstrel's owners abandoning plans to run him in the Prix de l'Arc de Triomphe and he was sent to the United States almost immediately.

By the end of his racing career, out of his nine starts The Minstrel won seven races, finishing second and third once each.

== Assessment and honours ==
In the 1977 poll organised by the Racegoers' Club, The Minstrel took twenty-six of the thirty-seven votes to win the title of British Horse of the Year. In the same year he was given a rating of a 135 by the independent Timeform organisation, making him the second highest-rated horse in Europe, two pounds behind his stable companion Alleged. In their book A Century of Champions, John Randall and Tony Morris rated The Minstrel a "superior" Derby winner and the sixteenth best Irish racehorse of the 20th century.

== Stud record ==
The Minstrel was re-acquired by Windfields Farm and syndicated for $9 million to stand at stud in Maryland. After the sale of Windfields Farm's Maryland division in 1988, The Minstrel was sent to Overbrook Farm in Lexington, Kentucky.

The Minstrel's son Palace Music won the Champion Stakes in 1984 and had an international impact at stud, siring the U.S. Racing Hall of Fame inductee Cigar and the leading Australian runner Naturalism.

A daughter of The Minstrel, Zaizafon, was the dam of Zafonic who won the 2000 Guineas in 1993.

Other Group One winners sired by The Minstrel included:

- L'Emigrant, foaled 1980 (won Poule d'Essai des Poulains)
- Treizieme, 1981 (Grand Critérium)
- Bakharoff, 1983 (William Hill Futurity)
- Minstrella, 1984 (Phoenix Stakes, Moyglare Stud Stakes, Cheveley Park Stakes)
- Melodist, 1985 (Oaks d'Italia, Irish Oaks)
- Silver Fling, 1985 (Prix de l'Abbaye)
- Musical Bliss, 1986 (1000 Guineas)
- Opening Verse, 1986 (Breeders' Cup Mile)

The Minstrel was euthanised at a veterinary clinic in Lexington on 3 September 1990 and buried at Overbrook Farm.

== Pedigree ==
Pedigree of The Minstrel (CAN), chestnut stallion, 1974
Sire Northern Dancer (CAN) 1961	Nearctic (CAN); 1954	Nearco	Pharos
Sire Northern Dancer (CAN) 1961	Nearctic (CAN); 1954	Nearco	Nogara
Sire Northern Dancer (CAN) 1961	Nearctic (CAN); 1954	Lady Angela	Hyperion
Sire Northern Dancer (CAN) 1961	Nearctic (CAN); 1954	Lady Angela	Sister Sarah
Sire Northern Dancer (CAN) 1961	Natalma (USA); 1957	Native Dancer	Polynesian
Sire Northern Dancer (CAN) 1961	Natalma (USA); 1957	Native Dancer	Geisha
Sire Northern Dancer (CAN) 1961	Natalma (USA); 1957	Almahmoud	Mahmoud
Sire Northern Dancer (CAN) 1961	Natalma (USA); 1957	Almahmoud	Arbitrator
Dam Fleur (USA) 1964	Victoria Park (CAN); 1957	Chop Chop	Flares
Dam Fleur (USA) 1964	Victoria Park (CAN); 1957	Chop Chop	Sceptical
Dam Fleur (USA) 1964	Victoria Park (CAN); 1957	Victoriana	Windfields
Dam Fleur (USA) 1964	Victoria Park (CAN); 1957	Victoriana	Iribelle
Dam Fleur (USA) 1964	Flaming Page (CAN); 1959	Bull Page	Bull Lea
Dam Fleur (USA) 1964	Flaming Page (CAN); 1959	Bull Page	Our Page
Dam Fleur (USA) 1964	Flaming Page (CAN); 1959	Flaring Top	Menow
Dam Fleur (USA) 1964	Flaming Page (CAN); 1959	Flaring Top	Flaming Top (Family 8-f)

== See also ==
- List of racehorses
- Northern Dancer
- Overbrook Farm
- Windfields Farm
