= Locust Grove Stakes =

- Class: Grade III
- Location: Churchill Downs; Louisville, Kentucky, United States
- Inaugurated: 1982
- Race type: Thoroughbred - Flat racing
- Website: Churchill Downs

Race information
- Distance: 1 1/16 miles
- Surface: Dirt
- Track: Left-handed
- Qualification: Fillies and mares, three-years-olds and older
- Weight: Base weights with allowances: Older: 125 lbs 3YOs: 122 lbs
- Purse: $400,000 (2021)

The Locust Grove Stakes is a Grade III American Thoroughbred horse race for fillies and mares aged three and older, over a distance of 1 1/16 miles held annually on the dirt track in September during the early fall meeting at Churchill Downs in Louisville, Kentucky. The current purse is $400,000.

== History ==
The event is named after the site known as Locust Grove where a 1790 Georgian mansion is situated on 55 acres upriver from Louisville. The house was originally home to William and Lucy Clark Croghan. Lucy was the sister to explorers William Clark and George Rogers Clark. They are the ancestors to Churchill Downs founder Col. M. Lewis Clark.

The event was inaugurated on 31 May 1982 and was won by the Excitable Lady and was ridden by Champion jockey Darrel McHargue winning easily as the 3/10 odds-on favorite by 7 lengths in a time of 1:37.20 over the one mile distance.

The following year the distance of the event was increased to 1 1/16 miles.

In 1986 the event's conditions were modified to a handicap. The following the event was held on the turf for the first time over a distance of 1 1/8 miles and was won by longshot Luckiest Girl at 20–1. The following year the event was held at a shorter distance 1 1/16 miles.

Previously a Listed race, it was upgraded to Grade III status for 1998 by the American Graded Stakes Committee.

In winning the 2003 running of the Locust Grove Handicap, Ipi Tombe became the first horse bred in Zimbabwe to ever win a race at Churchill Downs.

The event was idle in 2011 and 2012 and when it was renewed in 2013 the event was set back to the dirt and since then the event has been moved to the September short fall meeting the conditions allowed for three year old fillies to compete against the older mares as a stakes allowance race. Also due to not being held for to years the event lost its Graded classification. In 2016 the event regained its Grade III status once again.

In 2020 due to the COVID-19 pandemic in the United States, Churchill Downs did not schedule the event in their updated meeting.

== Records ==
Speed record

- 1 1/16 miles: 1:42.86 Shedaresthedevil (2021)
- 1 1/8 miles: 1:46.75 Shaconage (2004)
- 1 mile: 1:35.76 Genuine Devotion (IRE) (2008)

Margins

- 8 lengths – Frivolous (2015)

Most wins

- 2 - Colstar (2000, 2001)

Most wins by a trainer

- 4 - William I. Mott (1984, 1996, 1998, 2005)

Most wins by a jockey

- 2 - Charles R. Woods Jr. (1986, 1989)
- 2 - Shane Sellers (1995, 1998)
- 2 - Pat Day (1983, 2003)
- 2 - Brice Blanc (2004, 2005)
- 2 - Jon Court (2001, 2015)
- 2 - Julien R. Leparoux (2007, 2018)
- 2 - Brian Hernandez Jr. (2017, 2019)
- 2 - Tyler Gaffalione (2023, 2025)

Most wins by an owner

- 2 - Beverly R. Steinman (2000, 2001)
- 2 - Team Valor (1993, 2003)
- 2 - Glen Hill Farm (2006, 2009)
- 2 - G. Watts Humphrey Jr. (2015, 2017)

== Winners ==
| Year | Winner | Age | Jockey | Trainer | Owner | Distance | Time | Purse | Grade | Ref |
|---|---|---|---|---|---|---|---|---|---|---|
Locust Grove Stakes
| 2026 | Splendora | 5 | Flavien Prat | Bob Baffert | Boyd Racing (Randy Boyd) and By Talla Racing | 1 1/16 miles | 1:43.30 | $400,000 | II | |
| 2025 | Royal Spa | 5 | Tyler Gaffalione | Rodolphe Brisset | Breffni Farm | 1 1/16 miles | 1:42.53 | $395,000 | II | |
| 2024 | Musical Mischief | 4 | Edgar Morales | Michael McCarthy | Stoneway Farm | 1 1/16 miles | 1:42.91 | $379,340 | II | |
| 2023 | Search Results | 5 | Tyler Gaffalione | Chad C. Brown | Klaravich Stables | 1 1/16 miles | 1:42.40 | $397,000 | III | |
| 2022 | Played Hard | 4 | Joel Rosario | Philip A. Bauer | Rigney Racing | 1 1/16 miles | 1:43.50 | $393,000 | III | |
| 2021 | Shedaresthedevil | 4 | Florent Geroux | Brad H. Cox | Flurry Racing Stables, Qatar Racing and Big Aut Farms | 1 1/16 miles | 1:42.86 | $400,000 | III | |
| 2020 | Race not held | | | | | | | | | |
| 2019 | Go Google Yourself | 5 | Brian Hernandez Jr. | Paul J. McGee | Jay Em Ess Stable | 1 1/16 miles | 1:44.13 | $200,000 | III | |
| 2018 | Blue Prize (ARG) | 5 | Julien R. Leparoux | Ignacio Correas IV | Merriebelle Stable | 1 1/16 miles | 1:43.69 | $100,000 | III | |
| 2017 | Romantic Vision | 5 | Brian Hernandez Jr. | George R. Arnold II | G. Watts Humphrey Jr. | 1 1/16 miles | 1:43.91 | $100,000 | III | |
| 2016 | Engaginglee | 5 | Luis Saez | Dale L. Romans | Paul A. Lichtefeld & Jack D. Stewart | 1 1/16 miles | 1:46.24 | $100,000 | III | |
| 2015 | Frivolous | 5 | Jon Court | Victoria H. Oliver | G. Watts Humphrey Jr. | 1 1/16 miles | 1:43.85 | $100,000 | Listed | |
| 2014 | Don't Tell Sophia | 6 | Joseph Rocco Jr. | Philip A. Sims | Philip A. Sims & Jerry Namy | 1 1/16 miles | 1:45.76 | $108,200 | | |
| 2013 | Flashy American | 4 | Corey J. Lanerie | Kenneth G. McPeek | Preston Stables | 1 1/16 miles | 1:43.53 | $111,400 | | |
| 2011–2012 | | Race not held | | | | | | | | |
Locust Grove Handicap
| 2010 | Danzon | 7 | Alex O. Solis | James E. Baker | Alfred H. Nuckols Jr. | 1 mile | 1:37.02 | $116,200 | III | |
| 2009 | Closeout | 4 | Robby Albarado | Thomas F. Proctor | Glen Hill Farm | 1 mile | 1:38.38 | $114,900 | III | |
| 2008 | Genuine Devotion (IRE) | 4 | Alan Garcia | Kiaran P. McLaughlin | James J. Barry | 1 mile | 1:35.76 | $171,750 | III | |
| 2007 | Mauralakana (FR) | 4 | Julien R. Leparoux | Patrick L. Biancone | Maurice Hassan, Lewis Lakin, Richard Giacopelli & Fab Oak Stable | 1 1/8 miles | 1:47.99 | $162,900 | III | |
| 2006 | Rich in Spirit | 4 | Mark Guidry | Thomas F. Proctor | Glen Hill Farm | 1 1/8 miles | 1:50.00 | $165,450 | III | |
| 2005 | Delta Princess | 6 | Brice Blanc | William I. Mott | Saud bin Khaled | 1 1/8 miles | 1:48.90 | $164,550 | III | |
| 2004 | Shaconage | 4 | Brice Blanc | Mitch Shirota | Andrena Van Doren | 1 1/8 miles | 1:46.75 | $165,750 | III | |
| 2003 | Ipi Tombe (ZIM) | 5 | Pat Day | W. Elliott Walden | Team Valor Stables, Winstar Farm & Sunmark Partners | 1 1/8 miles | 1:47.70 | $164,400 | III | |
| 2002 | Voodoo Dancer | 4 | Jose A. Santos | Christophe Clement | Green Hills Farm | 1 1/8 miles | 1:46.91 | $168,900 | III | |
| 2001 | Colstar | 5 | Jon Court | Paul R. Fout | Beverly R. Steinman | 1 1/8 miles | 1:48.79 | $172,800 | III | |
| 2000 | Colstar | 4 | Alberto Delgado | Paul R. Fout | Beverly R. Steinman | 1 1/8 miles | 1:47.44 | $165,000 | III | |
| 1999 | Shires Ende | 4 | Willie Martinez | Richard R. Scherer | Carolyn Friedberg | 1 1/8 miles | 1:49.11 | $173,400 | III | |
| 1998 | Colcon | 5 | Shane Sellers | William I. Mott | Cavallix | 1 1/8 miles | 1:48.53 | $167,700 | III | |
| 1997 | Romy | 6 | Francisco C. Torres | Moises R. Yanez | William Pacella, Joseph Rizza & Ronald Schwed | 1 1/8 miles | 1:48.89 | $110,700 | Listed | |
| 1996 | Bail Out Becky | 4 | Craig Perret | William I. Mott | Kenneth and Sarah Ramsey | 1 1/8 miles | 1:47.38 | $111,800 | Listed | |
| 1995 | Memories (IRE) | 4 | Shane Sellers | Burk Kessinger Jr. | New Phoenix Stable & Alvin Haynes | 1 1/8 miles | 1:47.48 | $110,400 | Listed | |
| 1994 | Life Is Delicious | 4 | Jose R. Martinez Jr. | Peter M. Vestal | William I. Levy | 1 1/8 miles | 1:53.87 | $109,000 | Listed | Off turf |
| 1993 | Lady Blessington (FR) | 5 | Corey Black | Mark A. Hennig | Team Valor | 1 1/8 miles | 1:50.16 | $114,450 | Listed | |
| 1992 | Behaving Dancer | 5 | Donald Lee Howard | Robert E. Holthus | Prestonwood Farms | 1 1/8 miles | 1:47.27 | $115,000 | Listed | |
| 1991 | Nice Serve | 4 | Joe M. Johnson | Gary G. Hartlage | Ronald K. Kirk | 1 1/8 miles | 1:51.30 | $113,600 | Listed | |
| 1990 | Dibs | 4 | Aaron Gryder | Steven C. Penrod | Claiborne Farm | 1 1/8 miles | 1:50.60 | $104,405 | | |
| 1989 | Jungle Gold | 4 | Charles R. Woods Jr. | Frank L. Brothers | Lazy Lane Farms | 1 1/16 miles | 1:43.20 | $82,125 | | |
| 1988 | Chez Chez Chez | 4 | Jesse J. Garcia | Cotton John | Summerplace Farm | 1 1/16 miles | 1:45.20 | $85,500 | | |
| 1987 | Luckiest Girl | 4 | Donald Joseph Soto | Luis Albert Palacios | Maurice Miller | 1 1/8 miles | 1:51.60 | $56,100 | | |
| 1986 | Glorious View | 4 | Charles R. Woods Jr. | Michael B. Ball | Mira Ball | 1 1/16 miles | 1:44.00 | $56,450 | | |
Locust Grove Stakes
| 1985 | Sintra | 4 | K. Keith Allen | Steven C. Penrod | Cherry Valley Farm | 1 1/16 miles | 1:43.40 | $31,175 | | |
| 1984 | Heatherten | 5 | Sam Maple | William I. Mott | John A. Franks | 1 1/16 miles | 1:43.00 | $40,335 | | |
| 1983 | Try Something New | 4 | Pat Day | Claude R. McGaughey III | John A. Bell III | 1 1/16 miles | 1:45.20 | $35,625 | | |
| 1982 | Excitable Lady | 4 | Darrel G. McHargue | Inda Eduardoa | Tom Gentry | 1 mile | 1:37.20 | $37,100 | | |

Legend:
Turf Dirt

== See also ==
- List of American and Canadian Graded races
