= All Along Stakes =

- Class: Grade III
- Location: Colonial Downs, New Kent County, Virginia, United States
- Inaugurated: 1981
- Race type: Thoroughbred – Flat racing
- Website: www.laurelpark.com/

Race information
- Distance: 1 1/16 miles (8.5 furlongs)
- Surface: Turf
- Track: Left-handed
- Qualification: fillies and mares Three-years-old & up
- Weight: Assigned
- Purse: US$150,000

The All Along Stakes is an American Thoroughbred horse race run annually in September at Laurel Park Racecourse in Laurel, Maryland. Open to fillies and mares, age three and older, it is raced on turf at a distance of 1 1/16 miles. The race currently offers a purse of $150,000. In 2015, the Maryland Jockey Club agreed to move the Stakes race and run it at Laurel Park changing the name of a former race Lady Baltimore Stakes to the All Along Stakes.

The race is named for the great French racing mare, All Along. Owned by Daniel Wildenstein, she raced in Europe and North America. All Along was the 1983 Champion Older Mare in France and 1983 American Horse of the Year who was inducted in the United States Racing Hall of Fame in 1990.

The All Along Stakes has been held at four different tracks all in the Mid-atlantic region of the United States, it was held at Colonial Downs in New Kent County, Virginia from 1998 to 2013 and Laurel Park Racecourse from 1985 to 1996. The race was also held at Delaware Park in 1997 and Pimlico Race Course in 1990. The race was not held in 1986 or 1987. It was first graded in 1988 and it became a grade two race in 1990 and continued that way until 1997. Since 1998 the race has maintained its grade three status. The race was run at a distance of 1 3/16 miles from 1998 to 2014 and 1 3/16 miles in 1999 and 2000.

The All Along Stakes has served as a prep race to Breeders' Cup Filly & Mare Turf a Grade 1 race held as part of the World Thoroughbred Championships. In 2010 race served as the perfect race to Shared Account who went on to win the 2010 Breeders' Cup Filly & Mare Turf a Grade 1 race held at Churchill Downs. In December 2010 Shared Account went on to be named Maryland Horse-of-the-Year.

== Records ==
Most wins by a horse:

- 2 – Film Maker (2004 & 2006)

Speed record:

- 1 1/16 mile : 1:39.87 – Onus (2016)
- 1 1/8 mile : 1:46.58 – Film Maker (2006)
- 1 3/16 mile : 1:55.95 – Idle Rich (2000)

Most wins by an owner:

- 2 – Stuart S. Janney III (2016 & 2017)
- 2 – Courtlandt Farms (2004 & 2006)

Most wins by a jockey:

- 4 – Edgar Prado (1998, 2003 2004 & 2010)

Most wins by a trainer:

- 7 – H. Graham Motion (1998, 2004 2006, 2008, 2010, 2011 & 2015)

== Winners of the "All Along Stakes" since 1985 ==
Year	Winner	Age	Jockey	Trainer	Owner	Distance (Miles)	Time	Grade
2020		-				1 1/16	0:00.00	III
2019	Notapradaprice	5	Jorge Ruiz	John C. Servis	Stonehaven Steadings	1 1/16	1:41.27	III
2018	Valedictorian	4	J. D. Acosta	Kelly Breen	Epic Racing	1 1/16	1:45.74	III
2017	On Leave	4	Forest Boyce	Shug McGaughey	Stuart S. Janney III	1 1/16	1:40.24	III
2016	Onus	4	Forest Boyce	Shug McGaughey	Stuart S. Janney III	1 1/16	1:39.87	III
2015	Interrupted	4	Matt Rispoli	H. Graham Motion	Pin Oak Stable	1 1/16	1:50.28	III
2014	Medea	5	Forest Boyce	Francis "Tres" Abbott, III	Cornerstone Thoroughbreds	1 1/16	1:42.47	III
2013	Channel Lady	4	Javier Castellano	Todd Pletcher	James Scatuorchio	1 1/8	1:50.34	III
2012	Snow Top Mountain	4	Paco Lopez	Thomas Proctor	Barbara Hunter	1 1/8	1:49.48	III
2011	Aruna	4	Ramon Domínguez	H. Graham Motion	Flaxman Holdings, Ltd.	1 1/8	1:49.21	III
2010	Shared Account	4	Edgar Prado	H. Graham Motion	Sagamore Farm	1 1/8	1:49.16	III
2009	Winter View	5	Julien Leparoux	Jonathan E. Sheppard	Augustin Stable	1 1/8	1:49.56	III
2008	Lady Digby	4	Jeremy Rose	H. Graham Motion	Earle I. Mack	1 1/8	1:52.19	III
2007	Silver Charades	5	Jose Valdivia Jr.	Marty Wolfson	Live Oak Racing	1 1/8	1:49.62	III
2006	Film Maker	6	Ramon Domínguez	H. Graham Motion	Courtlandt Farms	1 1/8	1:46.58	III
2005	Stupendous Miss	4	Gary Stevens	Wallace Dollase	Horizon Stable	1 1/8	1:51.00	III
2004	Film Maker	4	Edgar Prado	H. Graham Motion	Courtlandt Farms	1 1/8	1:50.08	III
2003	Dress To Thrill	4	Edgar Prado	Christophe Clement	Moyglare Stud	1 1/8	1:49.16	III
2002	Secret River	5	Horacio Karamanos	Sondra Bender	Sondra Bender	1 1/8	1:50.76	III
2001	Colstar	5	Jon Court	Paul Fout	Beverly R. Steinman	1 1/8	1:47.53	III
2000	Idle Rich	5	Aaron Gryder	William I. Mott	Stonerside Stable	1 3/16	1:55.95	III
1999	no race	-	no race	no race	no race	1 1/8	0:00.00	III
1998	Bursting Forth	4	Edgar Prado	H. Graham Motion	Sam Huff	1 1/8	1:48.01	III
1997	Beyrouth	5	D. S. Rice	Jonathan Sheppard	Henri Chalhoub	1 1/8	1:49.27	II
1996	Another Legend	4	C. Omar Clinger	Vinnie Blengs	Harrison/Sullivan/Pomerantz	1 3/16	1:58.80	II
1995	no race	-	no race	no race	no race	1 1/8	0:00.00	III
1994	Alice Springs	4	René Douglas	Jonathan E. Sheppard	George W. Strawbridge Jr.	1 1/8	1:47.34	II
1993	Lady Blessington	5	Corey Black	Mark A. Hennig	Jeffrey Siegel	1 1/8	1:51.58	II
1992	Marble Maiden	3	Thierry Jarnet	Paul Cole	Sheikh Mohammed	1 1/8	1:49.89	II
1991	Sha Tha	3	Mike Smith	André Fabre	Allen E. Paulson	1 1/8	1:52.59	II
1990	Foresta	4	Ángel Cordero Jr.	Thomas Bohannan	Loblolly Stable	1 1/8	1:49.40	II
1989	Lady Winner	3	Kent Desormeaux	Maurice Zilber	Maurice Zilber	1 1/8	1:53.60	III
1988	Ravinella	3	Guy Guignard	Criquette Head	Ecurie Aland	1 1/8	1:49.80	III
1987	no race	-	no race	no race	no race	1 1/8	0:00.00	III
1986	no race	-	no race	no race	no race	1 1/8	0:00.00	III
1985	Bug Eyed Betty	2	Vincent Bracciale	Richard Small	Thomas Bateman	1 1/16	1:36.60	
