= Cigar (horse) =

American-bred Thoroughbred racehorse

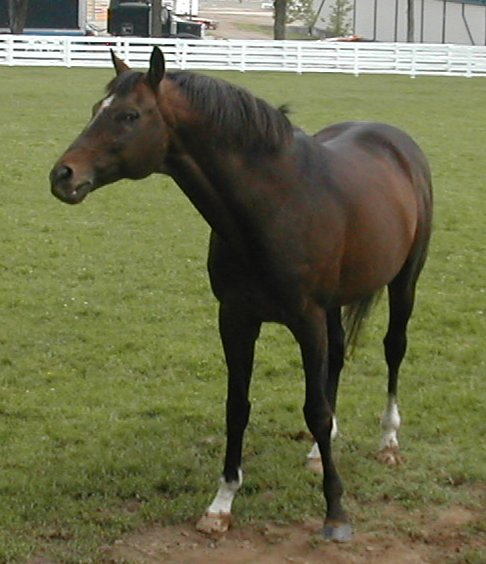
- Cigar enjoying his life in the pasture
- Sire: Palace Music
- Grandsire: The Minstrel
- Dam: Solar Slew
- Damsire: Seattle Slew
- Sex: Stallion
- Foaled: April 18, 1990; Bel Air, Maryland, U.S.
- Died: October 7, 2014 (aged 24); Lexington, Kentucky, U.S.
- Country: United States
- Colour: Dark Bay
- Breeder: Allen E. Paulson
- Owner: 1) Madeleine A. Paulson; 2) Allen E. Paulson
- Trainer: 1) Alex Hassinger Jr. 2) William I. Mott (from age 4)
- Record: 33: 19-4-5 (total); 22: 18-2-1 (dirt); 11: 1-2-4 (turf)
- Earnings: $9,999,815

Major wins
- NYRA Mile (1994); Donn Handicap (1995, 1996); Gulfstream Park Handicap (1995); Oaklawn Handicap (1995); Pimlico Special (1995); Massachusetts Handicap (1995, 1996); Hollywood Gold Cup (1995); Woodward Stakes (1995, 1996); Jockey Club Gold Cup (1995); Dubai World Cup (1996) Breeders' Cup wins: Breeders' Cup Classic (1995)

Awards
- American Horse of the Year (1995, 1996); Eclipse Award for Outstanding Older Male Horse(1995, 1996); Timeform rating: 138

Honours
- National Museum of Racing and Hall of Fame inductee (2002) #18 - Top 100 U.S. Racehorses of the 20th Century; Cigar Mile Handicap at Aqueduct Racetrack; Life-size statue at Gulfstream Park; Statue at Kentucky Horse Park

Cigar (April 18, 1990 – October 7, 2014), was an American Thoroughbred racehorse who was the 1995 and 1996 American Horse of the Year. He was the first American racehorse racing against top-class competition to win 16 consecutive races since Triple Crown winner Citation did so between 1948 and 1950. His major wins included the 1995 Breeders' Cup Classic, the NYRA Mile (later renamed in his honor), Jockey Club Gold Cup, Woodward Stakes (twice), Oaklawn Handicap, Hollywood Gold Cup, Donn Handicap (twice) and the first running of the Dubai World Cup. He became the leading money earner in racing history and was later inducted into the National Museum of Racing and Hall of Fame.

Originally campaigned on turf courses, he showed useful but unremarkable form in his early career. However, he emerged as an outstanding performer when switched to racing on dirt in late 1994. He was undefeated in 1995 in ten starts at racetracks across the United States, and received all but two of 306 ballots cast for American Horse of the Year. In 1996, he won the Dubai World Cup and three other races before his winning streak finally came to an end in August in the Pacific Classic. Despite narrowly losing two of his next three starts, he was named the America Horse of the Year for the second time.

After his retirement from racing, Cigar proved to be infertile and was quickly retired from stud duties. He nevertheless enjoyed a long retirement at Kentucky Horse Park before dying at the age of 24.

== Background ==
Cigar was a dark bay stallion with three white socks on his legs and a white star and stripe on his forehead. He was bred in Maryland by Allen Paulson and was foaled at Country Life Farm near Bel Air, Maryland. He was sired by Palace Music, who was a Group 1 winner in England and a Grade I winner in the United States on the turf. Cigar's success made Palace Music the leading sire in North America for 1995, but otherwise Palace Music was moderately successful with turf runners in Australia, New Zealand and Japan. Cigar's dam, Solar Slew, was by the 1977 Triple Crown winner, Seattle Slew. Cigar was a half-brother to Corridora Slew (ARG) by Corridor Key (USA), Mulca, and several other lesser performing horses. His second dam, Gold Sun, was a Group 1 winner in Argentina.

Madeleine A. Paulson was the original owner of Cigar. In his 2003 book, Legacies of the Turf, noted race historian Edward L. Bowen wrote that according to Paulson family banter, she traded Cigar to husband Allen for the filly Eliza, the 1992 Breeders' Cup Juvenile Fillies winner and that year's Eclipse Award choice for American Champion Two-Year-Old Filly.

Cigar was named after a navigational intersection for airplanes, not for the tobacco product. Owner Allen Paulson was a major figure in American aviation who had owned the Gulfstream Aerospace Corporation, which manufactured Gulfstream private business jets. He named many of his horses after the five-letter-long names given to intersections on aeronautical navigational charts.

Cigar stood 16.1 hands (65 inches, 165 cm) at maturity. He had a scar on his chest as a result of a paddock accident as a weanling. As a young horse, he had a habit of kicking out at his handlers, earning him a nickname of "the Hammer". He matured though into a kind horse who enjoyed greeting his fans and posing for the camera. His regular jockey, Jerry Bailey, later recalled a meeting between Cigar and Bailey's three-year-old son the day after the 1995 Breeders' Cup Classic. "He was just nuzzling on him," Bailey said. "Less than 24 hours earlier he was on fire, just a machine, and now he was like a pony in the parking lot of the Kmart. He really liked people."

== Racing career ==
=== 1993: three-year-old season ===
Cigar did not race as a two-year-old. Under his first trainer, Alex Hassinger Jr., he won twice in nine starts at age three, but failed to win in stakes competition. He did finish second in the Grade III Volante Handicap at the Oak Tree Racing Association fall meeting at Santa Anita, and third in the Grade III Ascot Handicap at Bay Meadows. During this period, Hassinger switched from racing him on dirt to racing him on turf tracks, but the horse remained a low-grade stakes/high-class allowance horse. As a three-year-old, Cigar earned $89,175.

Cigar made his first start on February 21, 1993 at Santa Anita in a maiden special weight race over six furlongs on the dirt. He was never a factor, finishing sixth. He then had some bone chips removed from his knees and did not return until May 9 in another maiden special weight over six furlongs on the dirt. He broke slowly but rushed up to second place after a fast opening quarter-mile in 22.19 seconds. He moved to the lead on the turn and continued to draw away to win by 2 1/4 lengths.

For his next starts, Hassinger switched Cigar to turf races over 1 1/16 miles with moderate results. On May 23, Cigar finished fourth in an allowance race after leading with a furlong to go, then finished third in his next start on June 12. On August 18 though, he displayed a burst of speed at the top of the stretch that quickly moved him from fifth to first. He continued to draw away to win by 2 3/4 lengths.

After finishing second in his next start, Cigar made his graded stakes debut in the Ascot Handicap at Bay Meadows. He raced near the front of the pack for the first three-quarters before taking the lead turning for home, opening a 3 1/2-length in mid-stretch. However, he was caught at the finish line and finished third, beaten by a neck. He then finished second in the Volante Handicap on November 5 before finishing a distant eleventh in the Hollywood Derby on November 30.

=== 1994: four-year-old season ===
The following year, Cigar was sent to an east-coast trainer, Bill Mott, who gave him the first half of the year off, bringing him back to racing in July. Cigar had moderate success in his first four starts of the year before breaking through with a dominant win in an allowance race on October 28. He followed up with his first Grade I win in the NYRA Mile (now the Cigar Mile Handicap), finishing the year with two wins from six starts and earnings of $180,838.

Cigar made his first start of the year on July 8 in an allowance race over 1 1/16 miles on the turf at Belmont Park. He vied for the early lead with Victory Cross but tired and finished fourth, beaten by nine lengths. Over the next two months, he continued to race in allowance races on the turf, finishing third on August 9 at Saratoga, seventh on September 16 at Belmont Park, and third on October 7 at Belmont Park. For his next start at Aqueduct on October 28, Mott switched Cigar back to dirt in a one-mile allowance race for non-winners of two races other than maiden or claiming (NW2 X). Cigar challenged for the early lead with the favorite, Golden Plover, completing the first quarter-mile in 22.42 seconds. Cigar then took the lead and drew away, winning by eight lengths. He did not lose again for 22 months.

Mott decided to step Cigar sharply up in class, entering him in the Grade I NYRA Mile at Aqueduct on November 26. He went off at odds of 9-1 in a field of twelve that featured stakes winners Devil His Due, Brunswick, Itaka, Bertrando, and Harlan. Cigar raced for the first half mile in fourth place, then made a strong move on the turn and opened up to win by seven lengths. "Cigar really smoked them," said jockey Jerry Bailey. "I rode him before, but that was on grass and he was flat that day. On the dirt, he's been different."

=== 1995: five-year-old season ===
At age 5, Cigar scored ten wins from ten starts, earning Beyer Speed Figures of 108, 114, 116, 121, 114, 117, 118, 111, 111, and 117. He travelled widely, winning races in Florida, Arkansas, Maryland, Massachusetts, California, and New York. Mott later commented, "I knew what was going on was special and was never going to happen again. The really good ones win races when they are not at their best. Whether he was coming off a layoff, or had a foot issue, or got caught in compromising position in a race. Cigar overcame all those."

Cigar started 1995 on January 22 in a 1 1/16 mile allowance race at Gulfstream Park in January, which he won by two lengths. He then faced the 1994 American Horse of the Year Holy Bull in the Donn Handicap on February 11 at 1 1/8 miles. Holy Bull was heavily favored based on his dominant 1994 campaign, with Cigar going off at 4-1. Cigar went to the early lead with Holy Bull pushing the pace to his outside. The two completed the half-mile heads apart in 46.48 seconds. However, as they turned into the backstretch, Holy Bull suffered a strain of the superficial flexor tendon and was pulled up. Cigar won, but little attention was paid to his victory due to the breakdown of Holy Bull, which signaled the end of his racing career. Cigar's winning streak stood at four.

He made his next start on March 5 in the Gulfstream Park Handicap over a distance of 1 1/4 miles, and went off as the heavy 1-2 favorite in a field of eleven. He rated behind the early pace set by Northern Trend, then quickly moved to the lead near the top of the stretch. He continued to draw away and won "as rider pleased" by 7 1/2 lengths. Cigar then went to Oaklawn Park in Hot Springs, Arkansas for the Oaklawn Handicap at 1 1/8 miles. The field featured several other highly rated older horses, including 1994 Breeders' Cup Classic winner Concern, who carried top weight of 122 pounds compared to Cigar at 120 pounds, and Silver Goblin, who was also on an extended winning streak, at 119 pounds. Cigar settled into position a few lengths behind the early leader, then started his move on the final turn. Silver Goblin was slightly ahead near the top of the stretch when his jockey accidentally struck Cigar in the face with his whip. Cigar briefly checked but then pinned back his ears and rallied, drawing away to win by 2 1/2 lengths in a time of 1:47.22.

Next was the Pimlico Special on May 13 at Pimlico Race Course in Baltimore at 1 3/16 miles. Cigar was the odds-on favorite despite carrying top weight of 122 pounds, compared to Devil His Due and Concern both at 121 pounds. In the absence of other early speed horses, Cigar went to the lead and set moderate opening fractions of 24.38 for the first quarter-mile and 48.16 for the half. He opened up his lead in midstretch and won under a hand ride by 2 1/2 lengths in a time of 1:53.72. "I think he's more versatile than any horse I've ever seen," said Paulson. "He can be behind. He can be in front. There's no way to defend against him."

For his next start, Cigar shipped to Suffolk Downs north of Boston for the Massachusetts Handicap at 1 1/8 miles on June 3. He was eligible for a $500,000 bonus after also winning the Gulfstream Park Handicap, Oaklawn Handicap, and Pimlico Special. He was the overwhelming favorite at 1-5 despite carrying 124 pounds, 9 to 17 pounds higher than his rivals. He tracked the early pace, then made his move turning into the stretch. He quickly opened a lead and won by four lengths in a time of 1:48.74. "If Cigar runs like he's been running, there isn't any horse that can beat him," said Bailey. "It's hard to get this horse in trouble. You almost have to go out of your way."

His connections originally planned to give Cigar some time off but decided instead to travel to California for the Hollywood Gold Cup at Hollywood Park on July 2 when the purse was increased to $1 million. Many great horses from the east, such as Kelso and Seattle Slew, suffered losses on the faster, harder California racing surfaces. The California track also assembled one of the greatest fields in the race's history, including Santa Anita Handicap and Pacific Classic Stakes winner Best Pal, Pacific Classic Stakes winner Tinners Way, Santa Anita Handicap winner Urgent Request, and old rival Concern, who had just won the Gold Cup's major preparatory race, the Californian Stakes. Nonetheless, Cigar was the odds-on favorite despite carrying top weight of 126 pounds (57 kg). He broke well and rated a few lengths behind the early pace. Turning into the stretch, he swept to the lead and drew away to win by 3 1/2 lengths in a time of 1:59.46. "We put him into a situation where he could have gotten beat, but it didn't matter," said Mott.

After returning to the east coast, Cigar was given a brief layoff before resuming training. He made his next start on September 16 at Belmont Park in the Woodward Stakes over 1 1/8 miles. In a field of nine that contained few serious contenders, he went off as the 1-10 favorite. He was even more heavily bet in the show wagering, creating the largest minus pool in New York's history. He tracked the early pace set by Star Standard, then moved to the lead in the stretch to win in hand by 2 3/4 lengths in 1:47.07. "He was pretty devastating," said Bailey.

Cigar’s next start was on October 7 in the Jockey Club Gold Cup at Belmont over a distance of 1 1/4 miles. He was again the odds-on favorite, with his main competition expected to come from three-year-old Thunder Gulch, who had won the Kentucky Derby and Belmont Stakes. Star Standard set the early pace, tracked closely by Thunder Gulch on the inside and Cigar on the outside. When Cigar started his move on the turn into the stretch, Thunder Gulch could not keep pace, eventually finishing fourth. Cigar opened up a 2 1/2-length lead in midstretch, then stood off a late run by Unaccounted For to win by a length in a time of 2:01.29. Cigar had not relished the going, which was heavy due to earlier rain, and it was the closest he had come to defeat in his now eleven-race win streak. "I would have to say this was probably not Cigar's best race,” said Mott. "He was used more, [Bailey] had to go to the whip... he had to reach down and ask him. It looked as if he had to put him into a little more of a drive. But he still won by a clear length."

==== Breeders' Cup Classic ====
Cigar ended the season by winning the Breeders' Cup Classic at Belmont Park on October 28. He was the odds-on favorite in a field of eleven horses, most of which he had already beaten. The main concern was that predicted heavy rain could turn the track muddy, a surface over which Cigar had never run. "There's nothing I can do about it," said Mott on the day before the race. "We know it's going to rain, and we know there's going to be some mud. But we're running no matter what. If he gets beat, so be it, but we're not afraid of anything."

Bailey was also concerned by his outside post position, number 10, on a day where most winners had run along the rail. Knowing Cigar risked getting stranded out wide for the entire race, Bailey urged him strongly from the starting gate and settled into third place behind L'Carriere and Star Standard, with Unaccounted For to his inside in fourth. "He leaves the gate wanting to go to the lead, and usually I have to discourage him from doing that," said Bailey. "But this time I gave him his head. When he got up there, I had to spend the next three-eighths of a mile trying to get him back. By that point I needed a little rest on my arms."

The opening fractions were moderate, 24.21 seconds for the first quarter-mile and 48.35 for the half, and Cigar moved easily down the backstretch. Late on the final turn, he made his move and quickly opened a lead on the rest of the field. He was never challenged in the stretch and won by 2 1/2 lengths. The final time of 1:59.58 was then the fastest Breeders' Cup Classic ever run, despite the muddy track condition. "Cigar is so fluid and so efficient that the only way you know you're going faster is when you look over and see you're going past everyone,” said Bailey. "I don't know if this was his best race, but it was his most important race. He did it the same way we've seen him do it so many times before. I don't know if he can duplicate this year. I don't know if that's possible for him or anybody else."

As Cigar swept to the lead, track announcer Tom Durkin gave one of the most famous calls in racing history:

"Cigar! Cigar makes his move, and he sweeps to the lead with a dramatic rush," said Durkin. As Cigar neared the wire, Durkin added, "Here he is, the incomparable, the invincible, the unbeatable Cigar."

Cigar had completed a perfect season, 10 for 10, with earnings of $4,819,800. In doing so, he matched Spectacular Bid's record in 1980, the most dominant campaign of that decade. Sportswriter Andrew Beyer said that "it was certainly safe to say [Cigar] is the best of the 1990s" due to his versatility. He received all but two of 306 ballots cast for Horse of the Year and was also named American Champion Older Male Horse. He had won a record eight Grade I events in a single season, equalled only by Lady's Secret in 1986. During 1995, Cigar set a single-season stakes-winning record for a North American-based Thoroughbred of $4,819,800, surpassing Sunday Silence's mark of $4,578,454.

=== 1996: six-year-old season ===
Cigar's six-year-old campaign started on a high note, with wins in the Donn Handicap and the newly created Dubai World Cup making him the world's richest racehorse. He then extended his winning streak to 16, matching the great Citation, before he was finally defeated in the Pacific Classic in August. He finished the year with a win in the Woodward Stakes followed by narrow losses in the Jockey Club Gold Cup and Breeders' Cup Classic. He was again named American Horse of the Year.

Cigar started his 1996 campaign on February 10 in the Donn Handicap, where he carried 128 pounds – 11 to 18 pounds more than the other entrants. Despite the weight difference, he was the heavy 1-5 favorite. He broke well then settled into third position off the opening pace set by Flying Chevron and Star Standard. He started his move on the far turn, followed by stablemate Wekiva Springs who moved to within a head as they turned into the stretch. In response to the challenge, Cigar quickly pulled away and won easily by two lengths. "He's going to be vulnerable because we're dealing with handicaps," said Mott. "I know some day this has got to come to an end, because we all get older," he added. "But Cigar has gotten stronger with every race. He just gets better and better."

Cigar's next start was expected to be in the Santa Anita Handicap but he had to miss the race after developing an abscess in his right front foot. Instead, he had eleven days of stall rest before resuming training for his next target, the inaugural Dubai World Cup, the world's richest horse race with a $4,000,000 purse. Cigar had to travel roughly 6,000 miles (9,700 km) from Florida to Dubai for the race, a journey of about 20 hours. Mott faced some criticism for the decision to run but responded by saying, "If I didn't think he was up to it, he wouldn't be going." Great horses had rarely traveled so far, duplicated their form, and then returned home in good shape.

The Dubai World Cup attracted a top quality field from around the world. The American contingent also included L'Carriere (second in the Breeders' Cup Classic) and Soul of the Matter (fourth in the Classic), while international challengers included Pentire, a multiple Group 1 winner from England, and Danewin with five Group 1 wins in Australia. Running at night and over a deep, sandy track made even heavier by recent rainfall, Cigar was also racing for the first time in twelve starts without Lasix. To further complicate matters, he broke poorly. "His rear end sort of came out from behind him," said Bailey. "He didn't handle the track very well."

Cigar found himself in the middle of the field behind the early pace set by L'Carriere. On the backstretch, he worked his way up to fourth, then launched his bid for the lead on the final turn. He pulled away from L'Carriere near the top of the stretch but then had to withstand a late run from Soul of the Matter. Soul of the Matter pulled almost alongside before Cigar responded to win by less than a length. "I don't think it was his best performance," said Bailey, "but I think it might have been his best effort." He was now the world's highest stakes-winning racehorse, and his streak stood at 14.

Cigar returned to seek a repeat win in the Massachusetts Handicap, where the largest crowd in the history of Suffolk Downs turned out to see him. He had to pass another test of greatness by carrying 130 pounds (59 kg) in the race. Cigar won again for his 15th straight victory, the longest winning sequence for a major American stakes horse since Citation, who won 16 in a row in 1948 and 1950.

Arlington Park carded a special race, the Arlington Citation Challenge, for Cigar to attempt to tie Citation's streak. He faced Dramatic Gold and Unbridled's Song and again carried 130 pounds (59 kg). He pulled away from Dramatic Gold nearing the wire to win his 16th race in a row.

==== The end of the winning streak ====
Cigar next attempted to surpass Citation's record in the Pacific Classic Stakes at Del Mar Thoroughbred Club near San Diego, California. Another record crowd of over 40,000 attended. As in his last race in California, the Hollywood Gold Cup, Bailey took Cigar wide most of the way. However, he was drawn into a three-horse speed duel with the good stakes horses Siphon and Dramatic Gold, going the first 3/4 of a mile in a very fast 1:09 1/5. The speed duel caused all the leaders to tire, and Dare And Go, ridden by Alex Solis, passed Cigar in the stretch to score the upset, with Cigar finishing second.

Cigar rebounded in the 1996 Woodward Stakes at Belmont Park, which was his last victory ever. Cigar lost to Skip Away (who went on to win the 1997 Breeders' Cup Classic and the 1998 Horse of the Year title) in the Jockey Club Gold Cup.

==== Breeders' Cup Classic ====
Cigar's final start was in the 1996 Breeders' Cup Classic, held on October 26 at Woodbine Racetrack in Toronto, Canada. After Skip Away bypassed the race, Cigar went off as the 3-5 odds-on favorite in a deep field that also included Grade I winners Will's Way (Travers Stakes), Atticus (Kentucky Cup Classic), Dare and Go (Pacific Classic), Editor's Note (Belmont Stakes), Dramatic Gold (Meadowlands Cup), Mahogany Hall (Whitney Handicap) and Louis Quatorze (Preakness Stakes). Alphabet Soup was a 20-1 longshot after having been disqualified from a win in his previous start. Cigar came into the race a bit short of training after his right front hoof required patching. He shipped to Woodbine on the 23rd, walked the paddock on the 24th and then had a strong gallop on the 25th. "Let's face it," said Jim Bond, the trainer of L’Carriere, who had faced off with Cigar in the Dubai World Cup. "Cigar is vulnerable. He’s had a long, tough year. It took L’Carriere a long time to recover from running in Dubai, and Cigar really didn’t take that much time off. I think it may finally be catching up with him."

The early speed horses, Atticus, Louis Quatorze and Alphabet Soup, all drew outside posts on a track that appeared to favor horses on the inside. Accordingly, the three horses all broke fast and quickly shifted over to the rail, running the opening quarter-mile in 22 4/5 seconds. Cigar broke slowly and on the wrong lead, and found himself in tight quarters in the middle of the pack. He started his move on the far turn but lacked his normal acceleration while running five wide. Turning into the stretch, Mt Sassafrass briefly took the lead before Alphabet Soup and Louis Quatorze rallied, racing heads apart through the final furlong. Cigar inched his way into third but could not get by, losing by a head to Alphabet Soup, who was a nose in front of Louis Quartorze. The final time of 2:01 set a new track record.

As a six-year-old, Cigar won five of eight starts and $4,910,000, breaking his own single-season earnings record. His third-place finish at Woodbine cost him the chance to be the first horse to win $10 million; he finished with $9,999,815.

Until Curlin surpassed him in 2008, Cigar was America's top money earner.

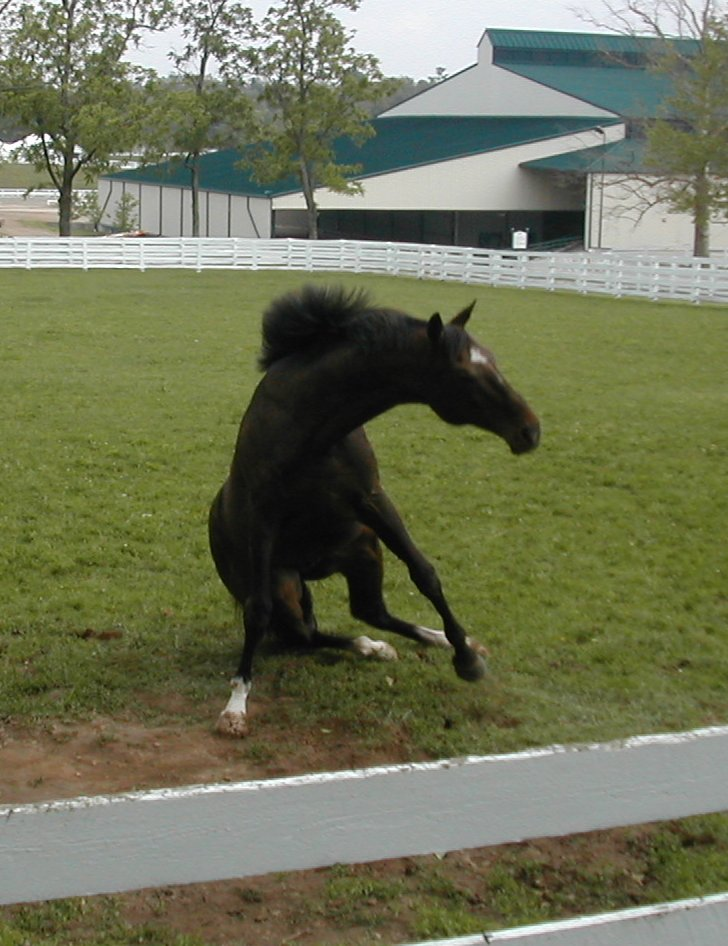
Cigar preparing for his daily roll in the dirt at Kentucky Horse Park

== Honors ==
Further accolades came when Cigar was named the Racehorse of the Decade of the 1990s. In 2002, he was inducted in his first year of eligibility into the National Museum of Racing and Hall of Fame. In the Blood-Horse magazine ranking of the top 100 U.S. thoroughbred champions of the 20th Century, Cigar was ranked #18. In accordance with that ranking, Cigar is the highest-ranked American Thoroughbred during the decade of the nineties (1990–1999) and therefore lays claim to the title American "Horse of the Decade."

Cigar won four Eclipse Awards. In 1995, he was named the American Horse of the Year and Champion Older Male Horse. Despite the losses during his six-year old campaign, he was named Horse of the Year and Champion Older Male Horse again in 1996.

On February 2, 1997, a life-size bronze statue of Cigar was unveiled at Florida's Gulfstream Park on "A Salute to Cigar Day." Also in 1997, the New York Racing Association renamed the Grade I NYRA Mile, run in November at Aqueduct, as the Cigar Mile. The NYRA Mile was the second race in Cigar's winning streak and his first Grade I win. On October 27, 2015, the Kentucky Horse Park unveiled a bronze statue of Cigar by Douwe Blumberg.

== Retirement ==
Cigar was retired to stud at the end of the 1996 racing season. Ceremonies took place during the National Horse Show at Madison Square Garden to honor the horse. Cigar was vanned through New York City accompanied for the last few blocks by the New York Knicks cheerleaders and the Budweiser Clydesdales. In the Garden, he was cantered around the arena by Bailey before the lights went out and a trumpeter started to play Auld Lang Syne. Veteran sportswriter Steve Haskin called it "he single most emotional moment I’ve ever experienced in racing."

Paulson sold 75% of Cigar to Coolmore Stud and Michael Tabor, and this equated to a value of $25 million for him. He was taken to stand at the Ashford Stud, the American division of Coolmore Stud, and began his coverings there in February. An insurance policy on Cigar required that he cover 20 mares twice and get at least 60 percent of them in foal to be considered fertile. He proved infertile as a stallion, as none of the 34 mares bred to him became pregnant.

Cigar lived out his retirement at the Kentucky Horse Park's Hall of Champions in Lexington. Around April 2014, Cigar began to suffer increasingly from osteoarthritis in his spine, leading to instability in his legs. He underwent surgery to correct the problem but complications ensued and he died on October 7.

== Race record ==
Date	Age	Distance	Race	Grade	Track	Surface	Odds	Field	Finish	Winning Time	Winning (Losing) Margin	Jockey	Ref
Feb 21, 1993	3	6 furlongs	Maiden Special Weight	Maiden	Santa Anita Park	Dirt	5.10	9	7	1:10.91	(13 lengths)	Patrick Valenzeula	
May 9, 1993	3	6 furlongs	Maiden Special Weight	Maiden	Hollywood Park	Dirt	5.20	6	1	1:09.56	2 1/4 lengths	Patrick Valenzeula	
May 23, 1993	3	1 1/16 miles	Allowance	Allowance	Hollywood Park	Turf	3.80	12	4	1:41.38	(1 3/4 lengths)	Patrick Valenzeula	
Jun 12, 1993	3	1 1/16 miles	Allowance	Allowance	Hollywood Park	Turf	2.90	10	3	1:41.46	(1 3/4 lengths)	Patrick Valenzeula	
Aug 18, 1993	3	1 1/16 miles	Allowance	Allowance	Del Mar	Turf	*1.90	10	1	1:41.81	2 3/4 lengths	Chris McCarron	
Sep 3, 1993	3	1 mile	Allowance	Allowance	Del Mar	Turf	3.30	6	2	1:35.06	(1/2 length)	Chris McCarron	
Sep 25, 1993	3	1 1/16 miles	Ascot Handicap	III	Bay Meadows	Turf	4.10	11	3	1:41.66	(1/2 length)	Patrick Valenzeula	
Nov 5, 1993	3	1 1/8 miles	Volante Handicap	III	Santa Anita Park	Turf	7.70	9	2	1:48.03	(2 lengths)	Patrick Valenzeula	
Nov 20, 1993	3	1 1/8 miles	Hollywood Derby	I	Hollywood Park	Turf	24.80	14	11	1:46.88	(14 1/2 lengths)	Patrick Valenzeula	
Jul 8, 1994	4	1 1/16 miles	Allowance	Allowance	Belmont Park	Turf	*1.70	5	4	1:43.07	(9 lengths)	Jose Santos	
Aug 8, 1994	4	1 1/8 miles	Allowance	Allowance	Saratoga	Turf	3.20	8	3	1:48.61	(3 lengths)	Mike Smith	
Sep 16, 1994	4	1 mile	Allowance	Allowance	Belmont Park	Turf	*1.90	11	7	1:33.14	(8 1/2 lengths)	Jerry Bailey	
Oct 7, 1994	4	1 1/16 miles	Allowance	Allowance	Belmont Park	Turf	3.40	6	3	1:41.40	(7 1/2 lengths)	Julie Krone	
Oct 28, 1994	4	1 mile	Allowance	Allowance	Aqueduct	Dirt	3.50	6	1	1:35.78	8 lengths	Mike Smith	
Nov 26, 1994	4	1 mile	NYRA Mile Handicap	I	Aqueduct	Dirt	8.90	12	1	1:36.10	7 lengths	Jerry Bailey	
Jan 22, 1995	5	1 1/16 miles	Allowance	Allowance	Gulfstream Park	Dirt	*0.50	8	1	1:43.22	2 lengths	Jerry Bailey	
Feb 11, 1995	5	1 1/8 miles	Donn Handicap	I	Gulfstream Park	Dirt	4.00	9	1	1:49.68	5 1/2 lengths	Jerry Bailey	
Mar 5, 1995	5	1 1/4 miles	Gulfstream Park Handicap	I	Gulfstream Park	Dirt	*0.50	11	1	2:02.95	7 1/2 lengths	Jerry Bailey	
Apr 15, 1995	5	1 1/8 miles	Oaklawn Handicap	I	Oaklawn Park	Dirt	*1.70	7	1	1:47.22	2 1/2 lengths	Jerry Bailey	
May 13, 1995	5	1 3/16 miles	Pimlico Special Handicap	I	Pimlico	Dirt	*0.40	6	1	1:53.72	2 1/4 lengths	Jerry Bailey	
Jun 3, 1995	5	1 1/8 miles	Massachusetts Handicap	Listed	Suffolk Downs	Dirt	*0.20	6	1	1:48.74	4 lengths	Jerry Bailey	
Jul 2, 1995	5	1 1/4 miles	Hollywood Gold Cup	I	Hollywood Park	Dirt	*0.90	8	1	1:59.46	3 1/2 lengths	Jerry Bailey	
Sep 16, 1995	5	1 1/8 miles	Woodward Stakes	I	Belmont Park	Dirt	*0.10	6	1	1:47.07	2 3/4 lengths	Jerry Bailey	
Oct 7, 1995	5	1 1/4 miles	Jockey Club Gold Cup	I	Belmont Park	Dirt	*0.35	7	1	2:01.29	1 length	Jerry Bailey	
Oct 28, 1995	5	1 1/4 miles	Breeders' Cup Classic	I	Belmont Park	Dirt	*0.70	11	1	1:59.58	2 1/2 lengths	Jerry Bailey	
Feb 10, 1996	6	1 1/8 miles	Donn Handicap	I	Gulfstream Park	Dirt	*0.20	8	1	1:49.12	2 lengths	Jerry Bailey	
Mar 27, 1996	6	1 1/4 miles	Dubai World Cup		Nad Al Sheba	Dirt	*1.00	11	1	2:03.84	3/4 length	Jerry Bailey	
Jun 1, 1996	6	1 1/8 miles	Massachusetts Handicap	Listed	Suffolk Downs	Dirt	*0.10	6	1	1:49.63	2 1/4 lengths	Jerry Bailey	
Jul 13, 1996	6	1 1/8 miles	Arlington Citation Challenge Invitational Stakes	Listed	Arlington	Dirt	*0.30	10	1	1:48.30	3 1/2 length	Jerry Bailey	
Aug 10, 1996	6	1 1/4 miles	Pacific Classic Stakes	I	Del Mar	Dirt	*0.10	6	2	1:59.85	(3 1/2 lengths)	Jerry Bailey	
Sep 14, 1996	6	1 1/8 miles	Woodward Stakes	I	Belmont Park	Dirt	*0.35	5	1	1:47.06	4 lengths	Jerry Bailey	
Oct 5, 1996	6	1 1/4 miles	Jockey Club Gold Cup	I	Belmont Park	Dirt	*0.20	6	2	2:00.70	(head)	Jerry Bailey	
Oct 26, 1996	6	1 1/4 miles	Breeders' Cup Classic	I	Woodbine	Dirt	*0.65	13	3	2:01.00	(1/2 length)	Jerry Bailey	

== Pedigree ==
Pedigree of Cigar (USA), bay stallion, 1990
Sire Palace Music 1981	The Minstrel (CAN); 1974	Northern Dancer	Nearctic
Sire Palace Music 1981	The Minstrel (CAN); 1974	Northern Dancer	Natalma
Sire Palace Music 1981	The Minstrel (CAN); 1974	Fleur (USA)	Victoria Park
Sire Palace Music 1981	The Minstrel (CAN); 1974	Fleur (USA)	Flaming Page
Sire Palace Music 1981	Come My Prince; 1972	Prince John	Princequillo
Sire Palace Music 1981	Come My Prince; 1972	Prince John	Not Afraid
Sire Palace Music 1981	Come My Prince; 1972	Come Hither Look	Turn-To
Sire Palace Music 1981	Come My Prince; 1972	Come Hither Look	Mumtaz
Dam Solar Slew 1982	Seattle Slew; 1974	Bold Reasoning	Boldnesian
Dam Solar Slew 1982	Seattle Slew; 1974	Bold Reasoning	Reason to Earn
Dam Solar Slew 1982	Seattle Slew; 1974	My Charmer	Poker
Dam Solar Slew 1982	Seattle Slew; 1974	My Charmer	Fair Charmer
Dam Solar Slew 1982	Gold Sun (ARG); 1974	Solazo	Beau Max
Dam Solar Slew 1982	Gold Sun (ARG); 1974	Solazo	Solar System
Dam Solar Slew 1982	Gold Sun (ARG); 1974	Jungle Queen	Claro
Dam Solar Slew 1982	Gold Sun (ARG); 1974	Jungle Queen	Agrippine (Family: 2-g)

== See also ==
- List of leading Thoroughbred racehorses
- List of racehorses
