= Opening Verse =

American Thoroughbred racehorse

- Sire: The Minstrel
- Grandsire: Northern Dancer
- Dam: Shy Dawn
- Damsire: Grey Dawn
- Sex: Stallion
- Foaled: 1986
- Country: United States
- Colour: Chestnut
- Breeder: Jacques D. Wimpfheimer
- Owner: 1) Sheikh Mohammed (UK); 2) Allen E. Paulson (USA)
- Trainer: 1) Henry Cecil (UK); 2) Richard J. Lundy (USA)
- Record: 30: 10-7-2
- Earnings: US$1,669,357

Major wins
- Somerville Tattersall Stakes (1988); Strensall Stakes (1989); Razorback Handicap (1990); Oaklawn Handicap (1990); Fort Harrod Stakes (1991); Turf Classic Stakes (1991) Breeders' Cup wins: Breeders' Cup Mile (1991)

Honours
- Opening Verse Handicap at Churchill Downs
- Last updated on January 24, 2010

Opening Verse (1986–2002) was a Thoroughbred racehorse who competed in England and the United States.

== Background ==
Bred in Kentucky, his sire was the 1977 Epsom and Irish Derby winner, The Minstrel. Out of the mare Shy Dawn, his damsire was Grey Dawn, the French Champion Two-Year-Old Colt who beat Sea Bird II in the 1964 Grand Critérium at Longchamp Racecourse.

== Racing career ==
=== United Kingdom ===
Trained in England by Henry Cecil for Sheikh Mohammed, at age two Opening Verse made his racing debut with a win in the August 27, 1988 Park Lodge Maiden Stakes at Newmarket Racecourse. Then, on September 30 he won the Somerville Tattersall Stakes on the same course and on October 25, the Provideo Stakes at Redcar Racecourse. As a three-year-old, Opening Verse went winless until September 7, 1989, when he won the Strensall Stakes at York Racecourse. In the Group One Eclipse Stakes at Sandown Park, he ran second to Nashwan.

=== United States ===
Sold to American, Allen Paulson, one of the preeminent owner/breeders of the 1980s and 1990s, as a four-year-old in 1990 Opening Verse raced in the United States under trainer Richard Lundy. Switched from racing on grass to dirt racing surfaces, he won the Razorback and Oaklawn Handicaps at Oaklawn Park then finished seventh in the 1¼ mile Breeders' Cup Classic, held that year at Belmont Park.

Racing on grass at age five in 1991, Opening Verse had his most successful year. He won the Fort Harrod Stakes at Keeneland, and the Turf Classic Stakes at Churchill Downs. Entered in the 1991 Breeders' Cup Mile, held that year at Churchill Downs, Opening Verse was up against what racecaller Tom Durkin described as "an exceptionally strong field" with stars such as Priolo, the French Champion Three-Year-Old Colt, and In Excess, the American Horse of the Year contender and betting favorite who came into the race having won four Grade 1 races that year. Sent off as a longshot at 26:1 odds, under jockey Pat Valenzuela, Opening Verse rallied from fifth place in the field of fourteen to take the lead in the homestretch and won the race by 1¼ lengths.

== Stud record ==
Retired to stud duty, Opening Verse's progeny met with modest success in racing, the best of which was Grade I winner and millionaire, Colstar.

== Pedigree ==
Pedigree of Opening Verse
Sire The Minstrel	Northern Dancer	Nearctic	Nearco
Sire The Minstrel	Northern Dancer	Nearctic	Lady Angela
Sire The Minstrel	Northern Dancer	Natalma	Native Dancer
Sire The Minstrel	Northern Dancer	Natalma	Almahmoud
Sire The Minstrel	Fleur	Victoria Park	Chop Chop
Sire The Minstrel	Fleur	Victoria Park	Victoriana
Sire The Minstrel	Fleur	Flaming Page	Bull Page
Sire The Minstrel	Fleur	Flaming Page	Flaring Top
Dam Shy Dawn	Grey Dawn	Herbager	Vandale
Dam Shy Dawn	Grey Dawn	Herbager	Flagette
Dam Shy Dawn	Grey Dawn	Polamia	Mahmoud
Dam Shy Dawn	Grey Dawn	Polamia	Ampola
Dam Shy Dawn	Shy Dancer	Bolero	Eight Thirty
Dam Shy Dawn	Shy Dancer	Bolero	Stepwisely
Dam Shy Dawn	Shy Dancer	Shy Bim	Bimelech
Dam Shy Dawn	Shy Dancer	Shy Bim	Bashful
