= Palace Music (horse) =

American-bred Thoroughbred racehorse and sire (1981–2008)

- Sire: The Minstrel
- Grandsire: Northern Dancer
- Dam: Come My Prince
- Damsire: Prince John
- Sex: Stallion
- Foaled: 12 April 1981
- Died: 7 January 2008 (aged 26)
- Country: United States
- Colour: Chestnut
- Breeder: Mereworth Farm
- Owner: 1) Nelson Bunker Hunt & Summa Stable; 2) Nelson Bunker Hunt & Allen E. Paulson
- Trainer: Patrick L. Biancone (France); Charles E. Whittingham (USA)
- Record: 21: 7-7-2
- Earnings: US$909,031

Major wins
- Prix Daphnis (1984); Champion Stakes (1984); La Coupe de Maisons-Laffitte (1985); Bay Meadows Handicap (1986); John Henry Handicap (1986); Col. F. W. Koester Handicap (1986)

Awards
- Leading sire in North America (1995); Timeform rating: 129
- Last updated on 14 June 2026

Palace Music (12 April 1981 – 7 January 2008) was an American-bred Thoroughbred racehorse and champion sire. Trained in both France and the United States, he won Group/Grade 1 stakes in both Europe and the United States.

== Background ==
Bred by Walter J. Salmon, Jr. at his Mereworth Farm in Lexington, Kentucky, he was sired by The Minstrel, a son of Northern Dancers. His dam was Come My Prince, a daughter of Prince John, whom The Bloodhorse magazine called "one of the greatest broodmare sires of all time."

Purchased and raced by Nelson Bunker Hunt and Bruce McNall's Summa Stable, he was conditioned for racing on turf in France by Patrick Biancone.

== Racing career ==
At age three Palace Music won the Group 3 Prix Daphnis at Longchamp Racecourse in Paris. In the autumn he won the Group 1 Champion Stakes at Newmarket Racecourse in England. As a four-year-old, Palace Music's only significant win in 1985 came in the Group 3 La Coupe de Maisons-Laffitte at Maisons-Laffitte Racecourse. Sent to the United States for the 2 November 1985 Breeders' Cup Mile, hosted that year by Aqueduct Racetrack, Palace Music finished second to Cozzene but was disqualified for interference and placed ninth.

Palace Music remained in the United States, Allen E. Paulson having acquired an interest in the colt from Bruce McNall. Turned over to American Hall of Fame trainer Charlie Whittingham, in 1986 the five-year-old won three stakes races on turf in California and came from fifteen lengths back to finish second by a head to Last Tycoon in the 1 November 1986 Breeders' Cup Mile hosted by Santa Anita Park in California. Shipped east to Maryland, two weeks later Palace Music finished third to long-shot winner Lieuenant's Lark in the Washington, D.C. International Stakes at Laurel Park Racecourse.

== Stud record ==
Retired from racing having won or placed in fourteen group/graded stakes races, in 1987 Palace Music stood at stud at Nelson Bunker Hunt's Bluegrass Farm near Lexington, Kentucky. The following year, he stood at Allen Paulson's Brookside Farms near Versailles, Kentucky. He remained there through the 1990 breeding season, after which he was sent to Segenhoe Stud in New South Wales, Australia, and later to Rangal Park Stud in Victoria.

Overall, Palace Music sired more than 400 winners, of which 33 were stakes race winners. He was also the damsire of 39 stakes winners. During his time at stud in the United States, he sired U.S. Racing Hall of Fame inductee Cigar. A 1990 foal, beginning in 1994 Cigar won sixteen consecutive races, tying the record set by Citation in 1949. His wins included the 1995 Breeders' Cup Classic and the Dubai World Cup. The two-time American Horse of the Year retired the richest horse in the history of world Thoroughbred racing with earnings of US$9,999,815.

Palace Music also met with considerable success as a shuttle stallion between Australia and New Zealand. Among the notable runners he sired were Group One winners Ready To Explode, Anthems and Naturalism, whose multi-millionaire dollar wins included the Group One Australian Derby (1992), Rosehill Guineas (1992) and Caulfield Stakes (1993). Another son, Palace Line, earned champion honours in South Africa and in Singapore.

Pensioned in January 2005, on 7 January 2008, the twenty-seven-year-old stallion was humanely euthanised at Rangal Park Stud.

Pedigree of Palace Music, chestnut stallion, 12 April 1981
Sire The Minstrel	Northern Dancer	Nearctic	Nearco
Sire The Minstrel	Northern Dancer	Nearctic	Lady Angela
Sire The Minstrel	Northern Dancer	Natalma	Native Dancer
Sire The Minstrel	Northern Dancer	Natalma	Almahmoud
Sire The Minstrel	Fleur	Victoria Park	Chop Chop
Sire The Minstrel	Fleur	Victoria Park	Victoriana
Sire The Minstrel	Fleur	Flaming Page	Bull Page
Sire The Minstrel	Fleur	Flaming Page	Flaring Top
Dam Come My Prince	Prince John	Princequillo	Prince Rose
Dam Come My Prince	Prince John	Princequillo	Cosquilla
Dam Come My Prince	Prince John	Not Afraid	Count Fleet
Dam Come My Prince	Prince John	Not Afraid	Banish Fear
Dam Come My Prince	Come Hither Look	Turn-To	Royal Charger
Dam Come My Prince	Come Hither Look	Turn-To	Source Sucree
Dam Come My Prince	Come Hither Look	Mumtaz	Mahmoud
Dam Come My Prince	Come Hither Look	Mumtaz	Motto (family 13-b)
