= Flaming Page =

Canadian-bred Thoroughbred racehorse

- Sire: Bull Page
- Grandsire: Bull Lea
- Dam: Flaring Top
- Damsire: Menow
- Sex: Mare
- Foaled: April 24, 1959
- Country: Canada
- Colour: Bay
- Breeder: E. P. Taylor
- Owner: Windfields Farm
- Trainer: Horatio Luro
- Record: 16: 4–4–2
- Earnings: $108,836

Major wins
- Shady Well Stakes (1961); Canadian Classic Race wins: Canadian Oaks (1962); Queen's Plate (1962)

Awards
- Canadian Champion Three-Year-Old Filly (1962)

Honours
- Canadian Horse Racing Hall of Fame (1980)

Flaming Page (April 24, 1959 – 1984) was a Canadian Thoroughbred who was a Champion racehorse and then an outstanding broodmare. She is best known as the dam of English Triple Crown winner Nijinsky. She was elected to the Canadian Horse Racing Hall of Fame in 1980.

== Background ==
Flaming Page was a bay mare bred in Canada by E. P. Taylor. She was sired by Bull Page, the 1951 Canadian Horse of the Year and a Canadian Horse Racing Hall of Fame inductee. Bull Page, who was also the sire of Canadian Hall of Famer New Providence, was an important early acquisition in Taylor's breeding enterprise. Despite his racing ability, Bull Page had soundness issues related to conformation defects that he passed on in varying degrees to his offspring.

Flaming Page was out of Flaring Top, a daughter of the 1937 American Champion Two-Year-Old Colt Menow. Flaring Top produced several other stakes winners and stakes producers including two-time American champion filly Doubledogdare.

Flaming Page grew into a large mare with a deep shoulder and a rangy build. She was sickle-hocked, a trait inherited from Bull Page. She raced under the colours of Taylor's Windfield Farm and was trained by Horatio Luro.

== Racing career ==
As a two-year-old, Flaming Page had only two wins from seven starts, but one of those was the Shady Well Stakes at Woodbine and the other was an allowance race at Aqueduct in the United States. She also finished second in the Princess Elizabeth Stakes and third in the prestigious Coronation Futurity against colts. On the Canadian Free Handicap for two-year-olds, she was rated at 115 pounds, which tied her for first among fillies.

In 1962, Flaming Page started her three-year-old campaign in the United Stakes, where the highlight was a second-place finish in the Kentucky Oaks to future U.S. Racing Hall of Fame inductee Cicada. On returning to Canada, she won the Canadian Oaks (now known as the Woodbine Oaks), Canada's most prestigious race for three-year-old fillies. One week later, she faced the colts in the Queen's Plate, where she and stablemate Choperion ran one-two as the even money favorites. Flaming Page became the first filly to complete the Oaks-Plate double.

After the Queen's Plate, Flaming Page returned to the United Stakes where she suffered a career-ending injury in the Coaching Club American Oaks. Canada's leading money-earner in 1962 with $88,075, she was named the Canadian Champion three-year-old filly.

== Breeding record ==
Flaming Page produced only three foals but even so would have a profound impact on the racing and breeding industry. Her first foal, born in 1964, was the filly Fleur, sired by Victoria Park. Fleur was a stakes-placed filly who became an outstanding producer. She is most famous for producing The Minstrel (by Northern Dancer), winner of the Epsom and Irish Derbies and King George VI and Queen Elizabeth Stakes and was 1977 Horse of the Year in England. Fleur also produced stakes winners Far North and Pilgrim, and stakes producer Dance Flower.

Flaming Page was the first mare mated with Northern Dancer when he retired to stud in 1965. She was so tall compared to him that a trench needed to be dug so he could complete the mating. That first colt was stillborn.

Flaming Page's next live foal, born in 1967, was the great Nijinsky, sired by Northern Dancer. Nijinsky, who physically resembled his dam, was England's first Triple Crown winner in 35 years and was named 1970 Horse of the Year in England. Nijinsky then became a Leading sire in Great Britain and Ireland and Leading broodmare sire in North America. Nijinsky was inducted into the Canadian Racing Hall of Fame in 1976.

Her final foal was Minsky, also sired by Northern Dancer, who became Ireland's champion 2-year-old colt in 1970. In 1969, Flaming Page suffered difficulties foaling another Northern Dancer colt, which subsequently died. Flaming Page was unable to conceive again and was retired in 1975. She died in 1984.

In 1980, Flaming Page was inducted into the Canadian Horse Racing Hall of Fame.

== Pedigree ==
Pedigree of Flaming Page, bay mare, 1959
Sire Bull Page 1947	Bull Lea; 1935	Bull Dog	Teddy
Sire Bull Page 1947	Bull Lea; 1935	Bull Dog	Plucky Liege
Sire Bull Page 1947	Bull Lea; 1935	Rose Leaves	Ballot
Sire Bull Page 1947	Bull Lea; 1935	Rose Leaves	Colonial
Sire Bull Page 1947	Our Page; 1940	Blue Larkspur	Black Servant
Sire Bull Page 1947	Our Page; 1940	Blue Larkspur	Blossom Time
Sire Bull Page 1947	Our Page; 1940	Occult	Dis Donc
Sire Bull Page 1947	Our Page; 1940	Occult	Bonnie Witch
Dam Flaring Top 1947	Menow; 1935	Pharamond	Phalaris
Dam Flaring Top 1947	Menow; 1935	Pharamond	Selene
Dam Flaring Top 1947	Menow; 1935	Alicibiades	Supremus
Dam Flaring Top 1947	Menow; 1935	Alicibiades	Regal Roma
Dam Flaring Top 1947	Flaming Top; 1941	Omaha	Gallant Fox
Dam Flaring Top 1947	Flaming Top; 1941	Omaha	Flambino
Dam Flaring Top 1947	Flaming Top; 1941	Firetop	Man o' War
Dam Flaring Top 1947	Flaming Top; 1941	Firetop	Summit (family: 8-f)
