= Bull Page =

American-bred Thoroughbred racehorse

- Sire: Bull Lea
- Grandsire: Bull Dog
- Dam: Our Page
- Damsire: Blue Larkspur
- Sex: Stallion
- Foaled: 1947
- Country: United States
- Colour: Bay
- Breeder: Woodvale Farm
- Owner: E. P. Taylor
- Trainer: Gordon J. McCann
- Record: 21: 9-6-3
- Earnings: $25,730

Major wins
- Autumn Stakes (1951); Canadian International Stakes (1951)

Awards
- Canadian Horse of the Year (1951); Leading broodmare sire in Britain & Ireland (1970)

Honours
- Canadian Horse Racing Hall of Fame (1977); Bull Page Stakes at Woodbine Racetrack

Bull Page (1947 – 1976) was a Canadian Hall of Fame Thoroughbred racehorse and an important sire.

Bred by Woodvale Farm in Kentucky, he was out of the mare Our Page, winner of the historic Spinaway Stakes in 1942 and a daughter of the 1929 American Horse of the Year and U.S. Racing Hall of Fame inductee Blue Larkspur. He was sired by Calumet Farm's Bull Lea, a five-time North American Champion Sire. Conformation defects resulted in Bull Page being sold at the 1948 Keeneland July sale for $38,000, a relatively low price for a Bull Lea colt whose son Citation had just won the U.S. Triple Crown.

Purchased by Ontario horseman, E. P. Taylor, Bull Page was conditioned by future Canadian Horse Racing Hall of Fame trainer Gordon J. McCann, who took over his training on the retirement of another Hall of Fame trainer, Bert Alexandra. Blessed with natural speed, the colt had health problems that kept him off the racetrack until age three, when he began racing in the early part of the year in Florida, earning his first win at Gulfstream Park. Sent north, Bull Page won two allowance races at Jamaica Race Course in New York City.

As a four-year-old in 1951, Bull Page won two important races in Toronto: the Autumn Stakes at Woodbine Park, and the Canadian International Championship at Long Branch Race Track. He notably ran second in both the King Edward and Jockey Club Cup Handicap. In a year in which he set a track record at Thorncliffe Park Raceway, Bull Page made sixteen starts and was unplaced on just two occasions. His 1951 performances earned him Canadian Horse of the Year honours.

== Stud record ==
Retired to stud duty at E. P. Taylor's National Stud Farm in Oshawa, Ontario, Bull Page was Canada's leading sire in 1958 and in 1970 was the Leading broodmare sire in Great Britain & Ireland. Four of Bull Page's daughters won the Canadian Oaks, the premier event for Canadian-foaled fillies: Air Page (1956), Yummy Mummy (1958), Maid o' North (1961), and Flaming Page (1962).

Bull Page also notably sired:

- New Providence (b. 1956) - in 1959 became the first official winner of the Canadian Triple Crown.
- Flaming Page (b. 1959) - Canadian Hall of Fame filly who won the Queen's Plate and Canadian Oaks in 1962, dam of British Triple Crown Champion, Nijinsky
