= Leading Counsel =

American-bred Thoroughbred racehorse

- Sire: Alleged
- Grandsire: Hoist The Flag
- Dam: Society Column
- Damsire: Sir Gaylord
- Sex: Stallion
- Foaled: 12 March 1982
- Country: United States
- Colour: Brown
- Breeder: Swettenham Stud
- Owner: Robert Sangster
- Trainer: Vincent O'Brien
- Record: 11: 5-2-0

Major wins
- Leopardstown Stakes (1984); Minstrel Stakes (1985); Irish St. Leger (1985)

Awards
- Timeform rating 106p (1984), 122 (1985), 114 (1986)

Leading Counsel (12 March 1982 – after 2006) was an American-bred Irish-trained Thoroughbred racehorse and sire. He showed great promise when winning the Leopardstown Stakes on his only start as a two-year-old in 1984 and was regarded as a leading contender for the following year's Epsom Derby. In 1985 he won the Minstrel Stakes and started favourite for the Irish 2,000 Guineas but recorded his biggest success on his final run of the year when he won the Irish St. Leger. He won one of his three races as a four-year-old before being retired from racing. As a breeding stallion he had considerable success as a sire of National Hunt horses.

== Background ==
Leading Counsel was a "big, lengthy" brown stallion with white socks on his front legs bred in Kentucky by his owner, Robert Sangster's Swettenham Stud. Sangster had acquired the colt in utero when buying the broodmare Society Column for $435,000 in January 1982. Leading Counsel was sent to Europe and entered training with Vincent O'Brien at Ballydoyle.

Society Column was a high-class racemare who won seven races including the Chrysanthemum Handicap in 1971 and produced several other good winners including the Princess Royal Stakes winner Sylph. She was a granddaughter of the American broodmare Manzana (foaled 1948), whose other descendants included Typecast and Siberian Express. Leading Counsel was sired by Alleged who won the Prix de l'Arc de Triomphe in 1977 and 1978. Alleged later became a successful breeding stallion, and a strong influence for stamina: his best winners included Miss Alleged, Shantou, Law Society, Legal Case and Midway Lady.

== Racing career ==
=== 1984: two-year-old season ===
The start of Leading Counsel's two-year-old season was delayed after he suffered a broken bone in his foot and he did not appear until October when he contested the Leopardstown Stakes over seven furlongs at Leopardstown Racecourse. Despite being matched against several previous winners he was made the 4/6 favourite and won easily by two lengths after being restrained towards the rear in the early stages. At the end of the year he was assigned a weight of 121 pounds in the Irish Free Handicap, 12 pounds behind his stablemate Law Society. The independent Timeform organisation gave him a rating of 106 p (the "p" indicating that he was expected to make more than usual improvement) making him 23 pounds inferior to their best two-year-old Kala Dancer but commented that he was "extremely promising" and "likely to make his mark in good company" in the future.

=== 1985: three-year-old season ===
In the early part of 1985 Leading Counsel was regarded as a serious contender for The Derby and was made favourite for the race in some lists. On his first run of the season, he contested the Minstrel Stakes over one mile on very soft ground at the Curragh Racecourse in April and won by two lengths from the Dermot Weld-trained Slane Castle. The colt was then moved up in class and distance or the Ballysax Stakes at the same course in the following month and sustained his first defeat as he was beaten into second place by Theatrical to whom he was conceding eight pounds in weight. Despite his defeat he was made the 11/10 favourite for the Irish 2000 Guineas on 18 May but finished sixth of the sixteen runners behind the filly Triptych.

After an absence of three months Leading Counsel returned in the Persian Bold Stakes over nine furlongs at Phoenix Park Racecourse in late August and got the better of Celestial Bounty to win by a neck. He was beaten in his next two races, finishing unplaced behind Commanche Run in the Irish Champion Stakes and then finishing second by a head to Nemain in the Blandford Stakes despite hanging left in the closing stages. The 1985 edition of the Irish St. Leger on 8 October was the third running of the race to be open to older horses and attracted a field of six three-year-olds, four four-year-olds, one five-year-old and one seven-year-old. Ridden by Pat Eddery Leading Counsel started the 7/4 favourite ahead of the French filly Faburola (Prix Kergorlay) whilst the other runners included Lord Duke (Gallinule Stakes), Civano (Dutch Triple Crown), Centroline (Jockey Club Cup) and Wagoner (Doncaster Cup). After racing towards the rear of the field Leading Counsel moved up into third place behind Flying Trove and Faburola on the final turn. The last quarter mile saw a sustained struggle between Faburola and Leading Counsel, with the colt wearing down the filly inside the final furlong to win by three quarters of a length.

At the end of the season Timeform gave Leading Counsel a rating of 122, making him nine pounds inferior to their best stayer Oh So Sharp and fourteen pounds inferior to their top-rated three-year-old Slip Anchor. In the official International Classification he was placed fourteen pounds behind the top-rated Slip Anchor.

=== 1986: four-year-old season ===
Leading Counsel began his third season by winning the European Racehorse Trial over eleven furlongs at Phoenix Park Racecourse. In September he was sent to France for the Prix Foy over 2400 metres at Longchamp Racecourse and finished a close fourth behind Mersey, Sirius Symboli and Antheus. On 12 October, on his third and final run of the season, he attempted to repeat his 1985 success in the Irish St. Leger but finished fourth of the six runners behind Authaal.

== Stud record ==
At the end of his racing career Leading Counsel became a breeding stallion, beginning his stud career at the Haras de Grand-Cour in France. He had his greatest success as a sire of National Hunt horses, with his best progeny including Justified (Powers Gold Cup), Knockara Beau (Cleeve Hurdle), Dun Doire (William Hill Trophy Handicap Chase), Liberty Counsel (Irish Grand National) and Rodock (Champion Hurdle Trial).

== Pedigree ==
Pedigree of Leading Counsel (USA), brown stallion, 1982
Sire Alleged (USA) 1974	Hoist The Flag (USA); 1968	Tom Rolfe	Ribot
Sire Alleged (USA) 1974	Hoist The Flag (USA); 1968	Tom Rolfe	Pocahontas
Sire Alleged (USA) 1974	Hoist The Flag (USA); 1968	Wavy Navy	War Admiral*
Sire Alleged (USA) 1974	Hoist The Flag (USA); 1968	Wavy Navy	Triomphe
Sire Alleged (USA) 1974	Princess Pout (USA); 1966	Prince John	Princequillo*
Sire Alleged (USA) 1974	Princess Pout (USA); 1966	Prince John	Not Afraid*
Sire Alleged (USA) 1974	Princess Pout (USA); 1966	Determined Lady	Determine
Sire Alleged (USA) 1974	Princess Pout (USA); 1966	Determined Lady	Tumbling*
Dam Society Column (USA) 1967	Sir Gaylord (USA); 1959	Turn-To	Royal Charger
Dam Society Column (USA) 1967	Sir Gaylord (USA); 1959	Turn-To	Source Sucree
Dam Society Column (USA) 1967	Sir Gaylord (USA); 1959	Somethingroyal	Princequillo*
Dam Society Column (USA) 1967	Sir Gaylord (USA); 1959	Somethingroyal	Imperatrice
Dam Society Column (USA) 1967	Journalette (USA); 1959	Summer Tan	Heliopolis
Dam Society Column (USA) 1967	Journalette (USA); 1959	Summer Tan	Miss Zibby
Dam Society Column (USA) 1967	Journalette (USA); 1959	Manzana	Count Fleet*
Dam Society Column (USA) 1967	Journalette (USA); 1959	Manzana	Durazna (Family:13-c)

* Leading Counsel is inbred 4S x 4D to the stallion Princequillo, meaning that he appears fourth generation on the sire side of his pedigree and fourth generation on the dam side of his pedigree.

* Leading Counsel is inbred 4S x 5S to the stallion War Admiral, meaning that he appears fourth generation and fifth generation (via Tumbling) on the sire side of his pedigree.

* Leading Counsel is inbred 5S x 4D to the stallion Count Fleet, meaning that he appears fifth generation (via Not Afraid) on the sire side of his pedigree and fourth generation on the dam side of his pedigree.
