= Shantou (horse) =

American-bred Thoroughbred racehorse

- Racing silks of Sheikh Mohammed
- Sire: Alleged
- Grandsire: Hoist the Flag
- Dam: Shaima
- Damsire: Shareef Dancer
- Sex: Stallion
- Foaled: 30 April 1993
- Country: United States
- Colour: Bay
- Breeder: Darley Stud
- Owner: Sheikh Mohammed
- Trainer: John Gosden
- Record: 14: 6-2-4
- Earnings: £824,249

Major wins
- St Leger Stakes (1996); Gran Premio del Jockey Club (1996); Gran Premio di Milano (1997); Princess of Wales's Stakes (1997)

Shantou (30 April 1993 – 1 September 2021) was a classic-winning Thoroughbred racehorse and sire. As a three-year-old in 1996 he won the St. Leger and the Gran Premio del Jockey Club as well as finishing third in the Epsom Derby and fourth in the Breeders' Cup Turf. In the following year he won the Gran Premio di Milano and the Princess of Wales's Stakes. After his retirement from racing he had success as a sire of National Hunt horses.

== Background ==
Shantou was a bay horse with a white sock on his left hind leg bred in the Kentucky by his owner Sheikh Mohammed's Darley Stud. He was sent into training with John Gosden in Newmarket, Suffolk.

He was sired by Alleged who won the Prix de l'Arc de Triomphe in 1977 and 1978. Alleged was a successful stallion, and a strong influence for stamina: his best winners included Miss Alleged, Law Society, Legal Case and Midway Lady. Shantou's dam Shaima was a high-class racemare who won the Strensall Stakes in England and the Long Island Handicap in the United States. She was a daughter of the English Fillies' Triple Crown winner Oh So Sharp.

== Racing career ==
=== 1996: thee-year-old season ===
Shantou was unraced as a juvenile and made his racecourse debut in April 1996 when he finished third in the Wood Ditton Stakes at Newmarket Racecourse. He went on to run second in a maiden race at Chester Racecourse on 7 May before recording his first success in a similar event over ten furlongs at Sandown Park Racecourse three weeks later.

In the 1996 Epsom Derby Shantou started a 25/1 outsider but belied his odds as he came home third of the twenty runners behind Shaamit and Dushyantor. He was beaten when favourite for his next two starts finishing third to Amfortas in the King Edward VII Stakes at Royal Ascot and second in the Listed July Trophy at Haydock Park. He returned to winning form when he took a minor event at Windsor Racecourse on 24 August.

The 220th running of the St Leger Stakes over 14 1/2 furlongs at Doncaster Racecourse on 14 September attracted a field of eleven and Shantou started the 8/1 fourth choice in the betting behind Dushyantor, Mons (Royal Lodge Stakes) and Gordi (Queen's Vase). Ridden by Frankie Dettori he was in contention from the start and finished strongly to catch Dushyantor in the final strides and win by a neck.

Shantou was then sent to Italy for the Group 1 Gran Premio del Jockey Club over 2400 metres at San Siro Racecourse in Milan when he was matched against older horses for the first time. With Dettori in the saddle he started 1.4/1 favourite and won "comfortably" by three lengths from Sacrament with Strategic Choice in third. For his final run of the season the colt was sent to Canada and finished fourth behind Pilsudski, Singspiel and Swain in the Breeders' Cup Turf.

=== 1997: four-year-old season ===
For his first run as a four-year-old, Shantou ran for the second time at San Siro Racecourse and recorded another Group 1 success when he took the Gran Premio di Milano over 2400 metres on 15 June, beating Luso by 1 1/2 lengths after taking the lead 2400 metres from the finish. On 8 July at Newmarket the colt started 11/4 second favourite for the Princess of Wales's Stakes and produced a strong late run to win by a head from Swain, with Celeric, Dushyantor and Lady Carla finishing behind.

In his two remaining starts Shantou came home fifth behind Swain in the King George VI and Queen Elizabeth Stakes at Ascot in July and then finished third to his old rival Dushyantor when 4/7 favourite for the Geoffrey Freer Stakes at Newbury Racecourse in August.

== Stud career ==
Retired to stud in 1999–2004 at S.A.B. Societa Allevamento di Besnate, Italy and At stud in 2005–19 standing at Burgage Stud, Ireland. Pensioned in December 2020. As a breeding stallion Shantou had his greatest success as a sire of National Hunt horse. He died on 1 September 2021 at the age of 28.

== Pedigree ==
Pedigree of Shantou (USA), bay stallion, 1993
Sire Alleged (USA) 1974	Hoist The Flag (USA); 1968	Tom Rolfe	Ribot* (GB)
Sire Alleged (USA) 1974	Hoist The Flag (USA); 1968	Tom Rolfe	Pocahontas
Sire Alleged (USA) 1974	Hoist The Flag (USA); 1968	Wavy Navy	War Admiral*
Sire Alleged (USA) 1974	Hoist The Flag (USA); 1968	Wavy Navy	Triomphe (FR)
Sire Alleged (USA) 1974	Princess Pout (USA); 1966	Prince John	Princequillo (IRE)
Sire Alleged (USA) 1974	Princess Pout (USA); 1966	Prince John	Not Afraid
Sire Alleged (USA) 1974	Princess Pout (USA); 1966	Determined Lady	Determine
Sire Alleged (USA) 1974	Princess Pout (USA); 1966	Determined Lady	Tumbling*
Dam Shaima (USA) 1988	Shareef Dancer (USA); 1980	Northern Dancer (CAN)	Nearctic
Dam Shaima (USA) 1988	Shareef Dancer (USA); 1980	Northern Dancer (CAN)	Natalma (USA)
Dam Shaima (USA) 1988	Shareef Dancer (USA); 1980	Sweet Alliance	Sir Ivor
Dam Shaima (USA) 1988	Shareef Dancer (USA); 1980	Sweet Alliance	Miss Peterkin
Dam Shaima (USA) 1988	Oh So Sharp (IRE); 1982	Kris (GB)	Sharpen Up
Dam Shaima (USA) 1988	Oh So Sharp (IRE); 1982	Kris (GB)	Doubly Sure
Dam Shaima (USA) 1988	Oh So Sharp (IRE); 1982	Oh So Fair (USA)	Graustark*
Dam Shaima (USA) 1988	Oh So Sharp (IRE); 1982	Oh So Fair (USA)	Chandelle (Family: 9-c)

* Shantou is inbred 4S x 5D to the stallion Ribot, meaning that he appears fourth generation on the sire side of his pedigree and fifth generation (via Graustark) on the dam side of his pedigree.

* Shantou is inbred 4S x 5S to the stallion War Admiral, meaning that he appears fourth generation and fifth generation (via Tumbling) on the sire side of his pedigree.
