= Hours After (horse) =

American-bred Thoroughbred racehorse

- Sire: Alleged
- Grandsire: Hoist The Flag
- Dam: Brown Berry
- Damsire: Mount Marcy
- Sex: Stallion
- Foaled: 20 January 1985
- Country: United States
- Colour: Bay
- Breeder: Crown Breeding Corp & Paul Sorren
- Owner: Marquesa de Moratalla
- Trainer: Patrick Biancone
- Record: 10: 2-2-2

Major wins
- Prix du Jockey-Club (1988)

Awards
- Timeform rating 119 (1987)

Hours After (foaled 20 January 1985) was an American-bred, French-trained Thoroughbred racehorse and sire bast known for his win in the 1988 Prix du Jockey Club. He was beaten in four of his five starts as a two-year-old, but showed promising form when winning a maiden race and finishing second in the Critérium de Saint-Cloud. In the following year he was well-beaten on his debut but then scored a narrow, upset win on his favoured soft ground in the Prix du Jockey Club. He failed to reproduce his best form in his three remaining races and was retired to stud at the end of the year. He made no impact as a sire of winners.

== Background ==
Hours After was a bay horse bred in Kentucky by Crown Breeding Corp & Paul Sorren. He was sired by the dual Prix de l'Arc de Triomphe winner Alleged out of the mare Brown Berry. Alleged a successful stallion, and a strong influence for stamina: his best winners included Miss Alleged, Shantou, Law Society and Midway Lady. Brown Berry won the Del Mar Debutante Stakes in 1962 before becoming a very successful broodmare. Apart from Hours After she produced the Belmont Stakes winner Avatar, the Prix d'Harcourt winner Monseigneur and the Strub Stakes winner Unconscious.

In September 1986 Hours After was consigned by Fred Seitz (acting as an agent for Paul Sorren) to the Keeneland yearling sale where he was bought for $60,000 by the bloodstock agency Horse France. The colt entered the ownership of the Marquesa de Moratalla and was sent to Europe to be trained by Patrick Biancone.

== Racing career ==
=== 1987: two-year-old season ===
Hours After was placed in his first three races before recording his first success in a maiden race over 1800 metres at Longchamp Racecourse in October. The colt was then moved up in class and distance for the 2000 metre Critérium de Saint-Cloud (run as a Group 1 for the first time) on 11 November. Ridden by Tony Cruz he started the 8.75/1 fourth choice in the betting, coupled with his stablemate Beyond Belief. Racing on heavy ground he was beaten half a length by Waki River, with the pair finishing four lengths clear of the favourite Blushing John with the Prix de Condé winner Triteamtri in fourth.

=== 1988: three-year-old season ===
Hours After began his second season in the Prix Hocquart (a major trial race for the Prix du Jockey Club), run over 2400 metres on firm ground at Longchamp Racecourse on 8 May. Ridden for the first time by the Irish jockey Pat Eddery he finished seventh, more than fourteen lengths behind the winner Nasr El Erab. On 4 June at Chantilly Racecourse, Hours After was one of sixteen colts to contest the 151st running of the Prix du Jockey Club over 2400 metres. Ridden again by Eddery, he started a 16/1 outsider in a field which included Nasr El Arab, Waki River, Exactly Sharp (winner of the Prix Lupin), Soft Machine (Prix Greffulhe) from France, Kris Kringle (Derrinstown Stud Derby Trial) from Ireland and Emmson (William Hill Futurity) from England. The race, run on soft ground, produced a blanket finish, with little more than two lengths covering the first ten finishers. Hours After prevailed by a short head from Ghost Buster's [sic], just ahead of Emmson, Exactly Sharp, Nasr El Arab and Waki River. Hours After was sent outside France for the first time when he contested the Irish Derby over one and a half miles at the Curragh three weeks later. Ridden on this occasion by Gerald Mosse, he started at odds of 14/1 and finished ninth of the eleven runners on good to firm ground behind Kahyasi.

After a two and a half month break, Hours After returned in the autumn of 1988, but failed to reproduced his best form. In the Prix Niel at Longchamp on 11 September, he finished tenth of the thirteen runners behind Fijar Tango. On his final appearance he finished sixteenth of the twenty-four runners behind Tony Bin in the 1988 Prix de l'Arc de Triomphe.

== Assessment ==
In the International Classification for two-year-olds in 1987, Hours After was rated the fifteenth-best juvenile colt in Europe, eight pounds behind the top-rated Warning. The independent Timeform organisation concurred, giving Hours After a rating of 119, eight pounds inferior to Warning, who was rated the best two-year-old colt.

== Stud record ==
Hours After was retired to stud at the end of his three-year-old season. He had very little success as a sire of winners.

== Pedigree ==
Pedigree of Hours After (USA), bay stallion, 1985
Sire Alleged (USA) 1974	Hoist The Flag (USA); 1968	Tom Rolfe	Ribot
Sire Alleged (USA) 1974	Hoist The Flag (USA); 1968	Tom Rolfe	Pocahontas
Sire Alleged (USA) 1974	Hoist The Flag (USA); 1968	Wavy Navy	War Admiral*
Sire Alleged (USA) 1974	Hoist The Flag (USA); 1968	Wavy Navy	Triomphe
Sire Alleged (USA) 1974	Princess Pout (USA); 1966	Prince John	Princequillo
Sire Alleged (USA) 1974	Princess Pout (USA); 1966	Prince John	Not Afraid
Sire Alleged (USA) 1974	Princess Pout (USA); 1966	Determined Lady	Determine
Sire Alleged (USA) 1974	Princess Pout (USA); 1966	Determined Lady	Tumbling*
Dam Brown Berry (USA) 1960	Mount Marcy (USA); 1945	Mahmoud	Blenheim
Dam Brown Berry (USA) 1960	Mount Marcy (USA); 1945	Mahmoud	Mah Mahal
Dam Brown Berry (USA) 1960	Mount Marcy (USA); 1945	Maud Muller	Pennant
Dam Brown Berry (USA) 1960	Mount Marcy (USA); 1945	Maud Muller	Truly Rural
Dam Brown Berry (USA) 1960	Brown Baby (USA); 1953	Phalanx	Pilate
Dam Brown Berry (USA) 1960	Brown Baby (USA); 1953	Phalanx	Jacola
Dam Brown Berry (USA) 1960	Brown Baby (USA); 1953	Crawfish	Halcyon
Dam Brown Berry (USA) 1960	Brown Baby (USA); 1953	Crawfish	Crauneen (Family:5-g)

* Hours After is inbred 4S x 5S to the stallion War Admiral, meaning that he appears fourth generation and fifth generation (via Tumbling) on the sire side of his pedigree.
