= 1990 Epsom Derby =

- Derby
- Location: Epsom Downs Racecourse
- Date: 6 June 1990
- Winning horse: Quest for Fame
- Starting price: 7/1
- Jockey: Pat Eddery
- Trainer: Roger Charlton
- Owner: Khalid ibn Abdullah

Epsom Derby 1990
1-2-3
Quest For Fame	Blue Stag	Elmaamul

Also Ran
4-5-6
Kaheel	Karinga Bay	Duke Of Paducah
7-8-9
Zoman	Treble Eight	Linamix
10-11-12
Missionary Ridge	Digression	Sober Mind
13-14-15
Bookcase	Razeen	Bastille Day
16-17-18
River God	Aromatic	Mr Brooks

The 1990 Epsom Derby was a horse race which took place at Epsom Downs on Wednesday 6 June 1990. It was the 211th running of the Derby, and it was won by Quest for Fame. The winner was ridden by Pat Eddery and trained by Roger Charlton. The pre-race favourite Razeen finished fourteenth.

== Race details ==
- Sponsor: Ever Ready
- Winner's prize money: £355,000
- Going: Good
- Number of runners: 18
- Winner's time: 2m 37.26s

== Full result ==
	*	Horse	Jockey	Trainer ^{†}	SP
1		Quest for Fame	Pat Eddery	Roger Charlton	7/1
2	3	Blue Stag	Cash Asmussen	Barry Hills	8/1
3	1½	Elmaamul	Willie Carson	Dick Hern	10/1
4	2½	Kaheel	Michael Roberts	Alec Stewart	33/1
5	2	Karinga Bay	Brian Rouse	Denys Smith	14/1
6	hd	Duke of Paducah	Ray Cochrane	Guy Harwood	14/1
7	hd	Zoman	Richard Quinn	Paul Cole	6/1
8	nk	Treble Eight	Bruce Raymond	Michael Jarvis	66/1
9	1½	Linamix	Gérald Mossé	François Boutin (FR)	11/2
10	10	Missionary Ridge	Michael Hills	Barry Hills	50/1
11	¾	Digression	Walter Swinburn	Guy Harwood	14/1
12	1½	Sober Mind	Alan Munro	Paul Kelleway	150/1
13	1½	Bookcase	John Williams	David Elsworth	150/1
14	1½	Razeen	Steve Cauthen	Henry Cecil	9/2 fav
15	hd	Bastille Day	Stephen Craine	Tommy Stack (IRE)	100/1
16	3	River God	Michael Kinane	Henry Cecil	28/1
17	12	Aromatic	Tony Clark	Guy Harwood	100/1
18	3	Mr Brooks	Pat Shanahan	Kevin Connolly (IRE)	66/1

* The distances between the horses are shown in lengths or shorter. hd = head; nk = neck.
† Trainers are based in Great Britain unless indicated.

== Winner's details ==
Further details of the winner, Quest for Fame:

- Foaled: 15 February 1987 in Great Britain
- Sire: Rainbow Quest; Dam: Aryenne (Green Dancer)
- Owner: Khalid Abdullah
- Breeder: Juddmonte Farms
- Rating in 1990 International Classifications: 123

== Form analysis ==
=== Two-year-old races ===
Notable runs by the future Derby participants as two-year-olds in 1989.

- Karinga Bay – 1st Washington Singer Stakes, 7th Horris Hill Stakes
- Linamix – 1st Prix La Rochette, 2nd Grand Critérium
- Missionary Ridge – 6th National Stakes, 3rd Horris Hill Stakes
- Digression – 1st Royal Lodge Stakes
- Bastille Day – 12th Cartier Million

=== The road to Epsom ===
Early-season appearances in 1990 and trial races prior to running in the Derby.

- Quest for Fame – 2nd Chester Vase
- Blue Stag – 1st Dee Stakes
- Elmaamul – 1st Easter Stakes, 7th 2,000 Guineas, 2nd Predominate Stakes
- Kaheel – 3rd Heron Stakes
- Karinga Bay – 3rd Sandown Classic Trial, 2nd Dante Stakes
- Duke of Parducah – 2nd Feilden Stakes
- Zoman – 2nd Poule d'Essai des Poulains
- Treble Eight – 7th Feilden Stakes, 4th Derby Italiano
- Linamix – 1st Prix de Fontainebleau, 1st Poule d'Essai des Poulains
- Missionary Ridge – 4th Sandown Classic Trial, 3rd Chester Vase
- Digression – 5th Predominate Stakes
- Sober Mind – 4th Warren Stakes, 3rd Prix Hocquart, 19th Derby Italiano
- Razeen – 1st Predominate Stakes
- Bastille Day – 6th Irish 2,000 Guineas
- Mr Brooks – 2nd Gladness Stakes, 5th Irish 2,000 Guineas

=== Subsequent Group 1 wins ===
Group 1 / Grade I victories after running in the Derby.

- Quest for Fame – Hollywood Invitational Turf Handicap (1992)
- Elmaamul – Eclipse Stakes (1990), Phoenix Champion Stakes (1990)
- Zoman – Prix d'Ispahan (1992), Washington, D.C. International Stakes (1992)
- Mr Brooks – July Cup (1992), Prix de l'Abbaye de Longchamp (1992)

== Subsequent breeding careers ==
Leading progeny of participants in the 1990 Epsom Derby.

=== Sires of Classic winners ===
Linamix (9th)

- Amilynx - 1st Prix Royal-Oak (1999, 2000)
- Vahorimix - 1st Poule d'Essai des Poulains (2001)
- Slickly - 1st Prix du Moulin de Longchamp (2001)
- Valiramix - 1st Bula Hurdle (2001)

=== Sires of Group/Grade One winners ===
Quest For Fame (1st)

- Sarrera - 1st Doomben Cup (2008)
- Viscount - 1st George Main Stakes (2001)
- De Beers - 1st Rosehill Guineas (2006)
- Dame d'Harvard - Dam of Harchibald

Elmaamul (3rd)

- Muhtathir - 1st Prix Jacques Le Marois (2000)
- Sweet Return - 1st Hollywood Derby (2003)
- Risk Seeker - 1st Sagaro Stakes (2004)
- Habbie Simpson - 3rd Classic Novices' Hurdle (2011)

=== Sires of National Hunt horses ===
Karinga Bay (5th)

- Coneygree - 1st Cheltenham Gold Cup (2015)
- Quwetwo - 1st Morebattle Hurdle (2010)
- General Miller - 1st Top Novices' Hurdle (2010)
- Megalex - Dam of Ballyandy and Megastar

=== Other Stallions ===
Blue Stag (2nd) - Exported to Brazil
Kaheel (4th) - Exported to West Indies
Duke of Paducah (6th) - Exported to America
Missionary Ridge (10th) - Exported to America
Digression (11th) - Exported to America
Razeen (14th) - Exported to India
River God (16th) - Minor jumps winner
Aromatic (17th) - Exported to America
