= Elmaamul =

American-bred Thoroughbred racehorse

- Racing colours of Hamdan Al Maktoum
- Sire: Diesis
- Grandsire: Sharpen Up
- Dam: Modena
- Damsire: Roberto
- Sex: Stallion
- Foaled: 8 February 1987
- Country: United States
- Colour: Chestnut
- Breeder: Rhydian Morgan-Jones
- Owner: Hamdan Al Maktoum
- Trainer: Dick Hern
- Record: 10: 5-2-1
- Earnings: £427,933

Major wins
- Easter Stakes (1990); Eclipse Stakes (1990); Phoenix Champion Stakes (1990)

Elmaamul (8 February 1987 – 31 August 2006) was an American-bred, British-trained Thoroughbred racehorse and sire. In a racing career which lasted from July 1989 until October 1990 he raced ten times and won five races. After winning both of his races as a two-year-old he became one of the leading British-trained three-year-olds in 1990. He won the Easter Stakes in April but recorded his most important victories in weight-for-age races, winning the Eclipse Stakes in July and the Phoenix Champion Stakes in September. He also finished third in The Derby and second in the International Stakes. Elmaamul was retired to stud at the end of the year and had some success as a sire of winners.

== Background ==
Elmaamul was a chestnut horse with a narrow white stripe and white markings on his hind feet bred in Kentucky by Rhydian Morgan-Jones. He was one of the most successful horses sired by Diesis, the top-rated European two-year-old of his generation, whose other progeny included Diminuendo, Love Divine, Halling and Ramruma.

As a foal, Elammamul was sent to the Keeneland Sales in November and was sold for $185,000. The colt entered the ownership of Hamdan Al Maktoum and was sent to Europe where he was trained by Dick Hern at West Ilsley in Berkshire. Elmaammul was ridden in all of his races by the Scottish jockey Willie Carson.

== Racing career ==
=== 1989: two-year-old season ===
Elmaamul made his racecourse debut in a seven furlong maiden race at Newmarket Racecourse on 28 July. He led from the start and was never seriously challenged, winning by three lengths from the odds-on favourite Satin Wood. On 19 September, the colt was moved up in distance for the Reference Pointer Stakes over one mile at Sandown Park Racecourse. Starting the 2/5 favourite, he took the lead a quarter of a mile from the finish and drew clear of the field to win by seven lengths from Air Music.

=== 1990: three-year-old season ===
Elmaamul began his second season on 14 April at Kempton Park Racecourse where he started 11/8 favourite for the Easter Stakes. He took the lead approaching the final furlong under a hard ride by Carson and won by half a length from Raj Waki with the Gran Criterium winner Candy Glen in fourth. On 5 May, the colt started at odds of 12/1 for the 2000 Guineas over the Rowley Mile course at Newmarket. His chances were not helped when he was hampered two furlongs from the finish and he finished seventh of the fourteen runners, almost ten lengths behind the winner Tirol. Eighteen days later, Elmaamul was moved up in distance to contest the ten furlong Predominate Stakes, a trial race for The Derby. He led the race for six furlongs before being overtaken by Shavian but recovered well after being hampered in the straight to finish second, four lengths behind the Henry Cecil-trained Razeen.

On 6 June, Elmaamul started at odds of 10/1 in a field of eighteen for the 211th running of the Derby at Epsom Downs Racecourse, with Razeen being made the 9/2 favourite. He turned into the straight in third place and although he made no further progress he stayed on well to finish third, beaten three lengths and one and a half lengths by Quest For Fame and Blue Stag. On 7 July Elmaamul was tested against older horses for the first time in the weight-for-age Eclipse Stakes over ten furlong at Sandown. The French-trained four-year-old Creator, winner of the Prix Ganay and Prix d'Ispahan was made the odds-on favourite ahead of Razeen, with Elmaamul third choice in the betting on 13/2. Carson tracked the leaders and turned into the straight in second place before sending the colt into the lead approaching the final furlong. Elmaamul won the Group One prize by half a length from Terimon with Ile de Chypre a further seven lengths back in third. On his next appearance, Elmaamul started the 7/2 second favourite for the International Stakes at York Racecourse on 21 August. After racing behind the leaders, Carson attempted to make a challenge in the straight but was initially unable to obtain a clear run. Elmaamul finished strongly but was beaten one and a half lengths into second place by the four-year-old filly In the Groove.

Less than two weeks after his defeat at York, Elmaamul was sent to Ireland for the last running of the Irish Champion Stakes at Phoenix Park before the track was closed and the race transferred to Leopardstown. Starting the 2/1 favourite, he won by one and a half lengths from the 66/1 outsider Sikeston with the subsequent Prix de l'Arc de Triomphe winner Saumarez beaten more than thirty lengths in seventh. Elmaamul ended his racing career in the Champion Stakes at Newmarket on 20 October, when he started the 5/1 third favourite. He raced prominently but was unable to quicken in the closing stages and finished fourth behind In the Groove, Linamix and Legal Case.

== Stud record ==
At the end of his racing career, Elmaamul was retired to become a breeding stallion. He was based in Italy in 2001 and 2002 but returned to England to stand at Beechwood Grange Stud in Yorkshire. The best of his offspring included Muhtathir (Prix Jacques Le Marois, Premio Vittorio di Capua) and Sweet Return (Hollywood Derby, Charles Whittingham Memorial Handicap, Eddie Read Handicap). Elmaamul was euthanised in 2006 due to a heart condition.

== Pedigree ==
Pedigree of Elmaamul (USA), chestnut stallion, 1987
| Sire Diesis (GB) 1980 | Sharpen Up (GB); 1969 | Atan | Native Dancer |
| Sire Diesis (GB) 1980 | Sharpen Up (GB); 1969 | Atan | Mixed Marriage |
| Sire Diesis (GB) 1980 | Sharpen Up (GB); 1969 | Rocchetta | Rockfella |
| Sire Diesis (GB) 1980 | Sharpen Up (GB); 1969 | Rocchetta | Chambiges |
| Sire Diesis (GB) 1980 | Doubly Sure (GB); 1971 | Reliance | Tantieme |
| Sire Diesis (GB) 1980 | Doubly Sure (GB); 1971 | Reliance | Relance |
| Sire Diesis (GB) 1980 | Doubly Sure (GB); 1971 | Soft Angels | Crepello |
| Sire Diesis (GB) 1980 | Doubly Sure (GB); 1971 | Soft Angels | Sweet Angel |
| Dam Modena (USA) 1983 | Roberto (USA); 1969 | Hail to Reason | Turn-To |
| Dam Modena (USA) 1983 | Roberto (USA); 1969 | Hail to Reason | Nothirdchance |
| Dam Modena (USA) 1983 | Roberto (USA); 1969 | Bramalea | Nashua |
| Dam Modena (USA) 1983 | Roberto (USA); 1969 | Bramalea | Rarelea |
| Dam Modena (USA) 1983 | Mofida (GB); 1974 | Right Tack | Hard Tack |
| Dam Modena (USA) 1983 | Mofida (GB); 1974 | Right Tack | Polly Macaw |
| Dam Modena (USA) 1983 | Mofida (GB); 1974 | Wold Lass | Vilmorin |
| Dam Modena (USA) 1983 | Mofida (GB); 1974 | Wold Lass | Cheb (Family: 9-e) |
