= 1988 Prix de l'Arc de Triomphe =

Horse race

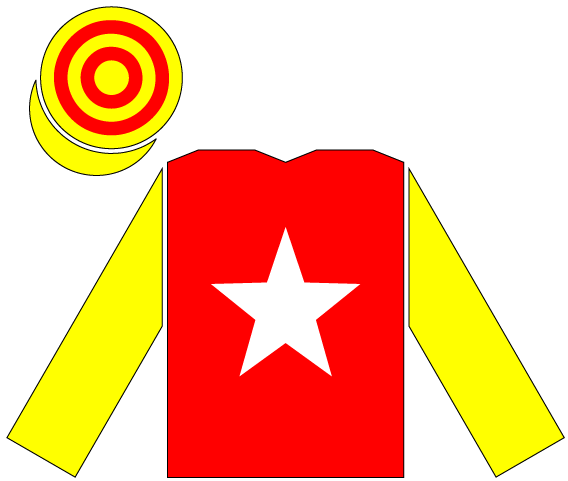
- Location: Longchamp Racecourse
- Date: October 2, 1988
- Winning horse: Tony Bin

The 1988 Prix de l'Arc de Triomphe was a horse race held at Longchamp on Sunday 2 October 1988. It was the 67th running of the Prix de l'Arc de Triomphe.

The winner was Tony Bin, a five-year-old horse trained in Italy by Luigi Camici. The winning jockey was John Reid.

== Race details ==
- Sponsor: CIGA Hotels
- Purse: 8,500,000 F; First prize: 5,000,000 F
- Going: Firm
- Distance: 2,400 metres
- Number of runners: 24
- Winner's time: 2m 37.3s

== Full result ==
Pos.	Marg.	Horse	Age	Jockey	Trainer (Country)
1		Tony Bin	5	John Reid	Luigi Camici (ITY)
2	nk	Mtoto	5	Michael Roberts	Alec Stewart (GB)
3	1	Boyatino	4	Maurice Philipperon	Jean Lesbordes (FR)
4	shd	Unfuwain	3	Willie Carson	Dick Hern (GB)
5	hd	Village Star	5	Cash Asmussen	André Fabre (FR)
6	¾	Kahyasi	3	Ray Cochrane	Luca Cumani (GB)
7	2	Fijar Tango	3	Tony Cruz	Georges Mikhalidès (FR)
8	½	Emmson	3	Tony Ives	Dick Hern (GB)
9	1½	Light the Lights	3	Greville Starkey	François Boutin (FR)
10	½	Diminuendo	3	Walter Swinburn	Henry Cecil (GB)
11	¾	Dark Lomond	3	Freddy Head	Vincent O'Brien (IRE)
12		Sarhoob	3	Dominique Boeuf	André Fabre (FR)
13		Triptych	6	Alain Lequeux	Patrick Biancone (FR)
14		Frankly Perfect	3	Éric Legrix	Jonathan Pease (FR)
15		Glacial Storm	3	Michael Hills	Barry Hills (GB)
16		Hours After	3	Gérald Mossé	Patrick Biancone (FR)
17		Indian Rose	3	Pat Eddery	Jean-Marie Béguigné (FR)
18		Waki River	3	Ronald Caget	Bernard Sécly (FR)
19		Luth Dancer	4	Paul Eddery	André Fabre (FR)
20		Roushayd	4	Frankie Dettori	Fulke Johnson Houghton (GB)
21		Lesotho	5	Guy Guignard	Criquette Head (FR)
22		Soft Machine	3	Norbert Jeanpierre	Patrick Rago (FR)
23		Polemos	4	Richard Hills	Harry Thomson Jones (GB)
24		Taboushkan	4	Richard Guest	Alain de Royer-Dupré (FR)

- Abbreviations: shd = short-head; hd = head; nk = neck

== Winner's details ==
Further details of the winner, Tony Bin.

- Sex: Horse
- Foaled: 7 April 1983
- Country: Ireland
- Sire: Kampala; Dam: Severn Bridge (Hornbeam)
- Owner: Veronica del Bono Gaucci
- Breeder: Pat O'Callaghan
