= Alleged (horse) =

American-bred Thoroughbred racehorse (1974–2000)

- Racing silks of Robert Sangster
- Sire: Hoist The Flag
- Grandsire: Tom Rolfe
- Dam: Princess Pout
- Damsire: Prince John
- Sex: Stallion
- Foaled: 4 May 1974
- Country: United States
- Colour: Bay
- Breeder: June H. McKnight
- Owner: J. R. Fluor & Robert Sangster
- Trainer: Vincent O'Brien
- Record: 10: 9-1-0
- Earnings: $636,775

Major wins
- Great Voltigeur Stakes (1977); Gallinule Stakes (1977); Royal Whip Stakes (1977, 1978); Prix du Prince d'Orange (1978); Prix de l'Arc de Triomphe (1977, 1978)

Awards
- Top-rated European horse (1977, 1978); Timeform top-rated horse (1977, 1978); Timeform rating: 138

Honours
- Champion Broodmare Sire in France (1998)
- Last updated on 23 July 2024

Alleged (4 May 1974 – 23 June 2000) was an American-bred, Irish-trained Thoroughbred racehorse and sire. He is best known for winning the Prix de l'Arc de Triomphe in 1977 and 1978. One of the outstanding racehorses of the twentieth century, he was only beaten once in his career.

== Background ==
Alleged was a bay horse bred by June McKnight. He was sold twice as a young horse, being sold for $34,000 as a yearling and $175,000 as a two-year-old. On the second occasion he was bought by Robert Sangster and his associates and sent to be trained in Europe. He ran originally in the colours of Robert Fluor before being transferred to Sangster's colours towards the end of his three-year-old career. According to Sangster, the original intention was to race Alleged in California, but it was felt that the colt's forelegs would not stand up to the stresses of American racing. Alleged was trained at Ballydoyle, in Ireland by Vincent O'Brien.

== Racing career ==
Alleged did not appear on a racecourse until November 1976, when he won the seven-furlong Donnelly's Hollow Maiden Stakes by 8 lengths at the Curragh.

As a three-year-old he won the Ballydoyle Stakes at Leopardstown Racecourse in April in workmanlike style but then created a 33/1 upset by winning the Royal Whip Stakes at the Curragh, beating his stable companion Valinsky who started favourite as well as the previous year's Irish St Leger winner, Meneval. Alleged then won the Gallinule Stakes and was originally scheduled to run in the Irish Derby, but Vincent O'Brien decided to run Epsom Derby winner The Minstrel instead and rested Alleged until August when he outclassed a strong field in the Great Voltigeur Stakes at York. Alleged started favourite for the St. Leger Stakes, but finished second to Dunfermline. Many observers felt that jockey Lester Piggott erred in taking on Dunfermline's two pacemakers throughout the race rather than conserving Alleged's stamina and using his superior finishing speed. In the 1977 Prix de l'Arc de Triomphe, Alleged led for most of the way and won readily by one and a half lengths from New Zealand champion Balmerino, easily reversing placings with Dunfermline who finished fourth. The depth of the field was shown by French Derby winner Crystal Palace finishing third and Crow finishing fifth.

At four, Alleged was unbeaten in three races. He won the Royal Whip Stakes again, but then missed the summer due to sore shins followed by a virus. He returned in the autumn to win the Prix du Prince d'Orange at Longchamp, breaking the course record for 10 furlongs. He then won his second Arc, winning by two lengths from the fillies Trillion and Dancing Maid.

== Assessment ==
In the inaugural International Classification, a collaboration between the official handicappers of Britain, France and Ireland, Alleged was rated the best European horse of 1977 with a rating of 138. He was again rated the best European horse in 1978 with a rating of 140.

Alleged was given a Timeform rating of 137 in 1977 and 138 in 1978. In both seasons, he was the organisation's highest rated horse.

== Stud record ==
Retired after the 1978 racing season, Alleged was syndicated for $16 million and stood at stud at Walmac International near Lexington, Kentucky. He sired a number of champions. Among them were Miss Alleged, Midway Lady, Shantou, Flemensfirth, Legal Case, Law Society, Leading Counsel and Strategic Choice. Alleged is the grandsire of 2005 Grand National winner, Hedgehunter and damsire of 2010 winner, Don't Push It.

Alleged was pensioned in 1998 and died on 23 June 2000 from the infirmities of old age. He is buried at Walmac International.

== Sire line tree ==
- Alleged
  - Montelimar
    - Monty's Pass
    - Hedgehunter
  - Law Society
    - Approach the Bench
    - Fortune's Wheel
    - Homme de Loi
    - Right Win
    - Court of Honour
    - Anzillero
    - Catch Me
  - Leading Counsel
    - Rodock
    - Dun Doire
    - Justified
    - Knockara Beau
  - Hours After
  - Legal Case
    - Evil Knievel
  - Strategic Choice
    - Bog Warrior
    - Grey Gold
  - Flemensfirth
    - Joe Lively
    - Imperial Commander
    - Tidal Bay
    - Pandorama
    - Flemenstar
    - Lostintranslation
    - Tornado Flyer
  - Flat Top
  - Shantou
    - Ballynagour
    - Morning Assembly
    - Briar Hill
    - Beware The Bear
    - Death Duty
    - The Storyteller
    - Something Soon
    - Run Wild Fred
    - Jim Key

== Pedigree ==
Pedigree of Alleged
Sire Hoist The Flag (USA) 1968	Tom Rolfe (USA); 1962	Ribot	Tenerani
Sire Hoist The Flag (USA) 1968	Tom Rolfe (USA); 1962	Ribot	Romanella
Sire Hoist The Flag (USA) 1968	Tom Rolfe (USA); 1962	Pocahontas	Roman
Sire Hoist The Flag (USA) 1968	Tom Rolfe (USA); 1962	Pocahontas	How*
Sire Hoist The Flag (USA) 1968	Wavy Navy (USA); 1954	War Admiral*	Man o' War*
Sire Hoist The Flag (USA) 1968	Wavy Navy (USA); 1954	War Admiral*	Brushup*
Sire Hoist The Flag (USA) 1968	Wavy Navy (USA); 1954	Triomphe	Tourbillon
Sire Hoist The Flag (USA) 1968	Wavy Navy (USA); 1954	Triomphe	Melibee
Dam Princess Pout (USA) 1966	Prince John (USA); 1953	Princequillo*	Prince Rose
Dam Princess Pout (USA) 1966	Prince John (USA); 1953	Princequillo*	Cosquilla
Dam Princess Pout (USA) 1966	Prince John (USA); 1953	Not Afraid	Count Fleet
Dam Princess Pout (USA) 1966	Prince John (USA); 1953	Not Afraid	Banish Fear
Dam Princess Pout (USA) 1966	Determined Lady (USA); 1959	Determine	Alibhai
Dam Princess Pout (USA) 1966	Determined Lady (USA); 1959	Determine	Koubis
Dam Princess Pout (USA) 1966	Determined Lady (USA); 1959	Tumbling	War Admiral*
Dam Princess Pout (USA) 1966	Determined Lady (USA); 1959	Tumbling	Up The Hill

* Alleged is inbred 3S x 4D to the stallion War Admiral, meaning that he appears third generation on the sire side of his pedigree and fourth generation on the dam side of his pedigree.

* Alleged is inbred 5S x 3D to the stallion Princequillo, meaning that he appears fifth generation (via How) on the sire side of his pedigree and third generation on the dam side of his pedigree.

== See also ==
- List of leading Thoroughbred racehorses
