= Hoist The King =

American-bred Thoroughbred racehorse

- Sire: Hoist The Flag
- Grandsire: Tom Rolfe
- Dam: Royal Dowry
- Damsire: Royal Charger
- Sex: Stallion
- Foaled: 19 March 1978
- Country: United States
- Colour: Dark Bay or Brown
- Breeder: Tom Gentry
- Owner: Kazuo Nakamura & Yorozu Sugawara
- Trainer: J T Doyle
- Record: 9: 0-1-1

Hoist The King (1978 – c. 1995) was an American Thoroughbred racehorse who sold for a record-setting $1.6 million ($7.1 million inflation adjusted) as a yearling in 1979. He proved to be of little use as a racehorse, failing to win in nine races. He later stood as a breeding stallion in Japan with little success.

== Background ==
Hoist The King was a bay horse bred in Kentucky by Tom Gentry. His dam, Royal Dowry was a half-sister to Dear April whose descendants have included Bahri and Ajina. Before foaling Hoist The King, Royal Dowry had already produced the Frizette Stakes winner Tudor Queen and the Las Palmas Handicap winner Chargers Star. Hoist The King was sired by Hoist the Flag, the American Champion Two-Year-Old Colt of his generation whose other progeny included the dual Prix de l'Arc de Triomphe winner Alleged.

At the 1979 Keeneland July Sales he was bought for a then world-record price of $1.6 million by the late John Corbett of Heron Bloodstock Services acting as agent for Kazuo Nakamura who outbid the British Bloodstock Agency's Joss Collins who was bidding on behalf of the English owner, Robert Sangster. When the gavel fell, the consignor, Tom Gentry, rushed over to the successful Japanese owner and gave him the multi-coloured 'trademark' jacket that he was wearing. Mr. Nakamura declared that he was going to name his new acquisition "Ichi-ban".

== Racing career ==
Hoist the King spent his racing career in California trained by J.T. (Tommy) Doyle, finishing second and third in his two races as a juvenile and running unplaced on his only appearance as a three-year-old.

== Stud record ==
Hoist the King was retired from racing to become a breeding stallion in Japan. He was not a success, siring twenty winners in thirteen covering seasons from 1983 to 1995.

== Pedigree ==
Pedigree of Hoist The King, bay colt, 1978
Sire Hoist The Flag (USA) 1968	Tom Rolfe (USA); 1962	Ribot	Tenerani
Sire Hoist The Flag (USA) 1968	Tom Rolfe (USA); 1962	Ribot	Romanella
Sire Hoist The Flag (USA) 1968	Tom Rolfe (USA); 1962	Pocahontas	Roman
Sire Hoist The Flag (USA) 1968	Tom Rolfe (USA); 1962	Pocahontas	How
Sire Hoist The Flag (USA) 1968	Wavy Navy (USA); 1954	War Admiral	Man o' War
Sire Hoist The Flag (USA) 1968	Wavy Navy (USA); 1954	War Admiral	Brushup
Sire Hoist The Flag (USA) 1968	Wavy Navy (USA); 1954	Triomphe	Tourbillon
Sire Hoist The Flag (USA) 1968	Wavy Navy (USA); 1954	Triomphe	Melibee
Dam Royal Dowry (USA) 1959	Royal Charger (GB); 1942	Nearco	Pharos
Dam Royal Dowry (USA) 1959	Royal Charger (GB); 1942	Nearco	Nogara
Dam Royal Dowry (USA) 1959	Royal Charger (GB); 1942	Sun Princess	Solario
Dam Royal Dowry (USA) 1959	Royal Charger (GB); 1942	Sun Princess	Mumtaz Begum
Dam Royal Dowry (USA) 1959	Querida (USA); 1951	Alibhai	Hyperion
Dam Royal Dowry (USA) 1959	Querida (USA); 1951	Alibhai	Teresina
Dam Royal Dowry (USA) 1959	Querida (USA); 1951	Durazna	Bull Lea
Dam Royal Dowry (USA) 1959	Querida (USA); 1951	Durazna	Myrtlewood (Family 13-c)

Records
Preceded by Canadian Bound	Most expensive Thoroughbred colt yearling 1979 – July 22, 1980	Next: Lichine
