= Diminuendo (horse) =

American-bred, British-trained Thoroughbred racehorse

- Racing colours of Sheikh Mohammed
- Sire: Diesis
- Grandsire: Sharpen Up
- Dam: Cacti
- Damsire: Tom Rolfe
- Sex: Mare
- Foaled: 9 Feb 1985
- Country: United Kingdom
- Colour: Chestnut
- Breeder: Nancy S Dillman
- Owner: Sheikh Mohammed
- Trainer: Henry Cecil
- Record: 10:6-1-2
- Earnings: £590,079

Major wins
- Cherry Hinton Stakes (1987); Fillies' Mile (1987); Musidora Stakes (1988); Gold Seal Oaks (1988); Irish Oaks (1988); Yorkshire Oaks (1988)

Awards
- Top-rated European three-year-old filly (1988); Timeform top-rated three-year-old filly (1988); Timeform rating 126

Diminuendo (9 February 1985 – 2010) was an American-bred, British-trained Thoroughbred racehorse and broodmare best known for winning two classic races, the Epsom Oaks and the Irish Oaks in 1988. She was one of the best two-year-old fillies of 1987, when she won all four of her races including the Cherry Hinton Stakes and Fillies' Mile. In 1988 she was beaten in her first two races, but won her next four, taking the Musidora Stakes, Epsom Oaks, Irish Oaks and Yorkshire Oaks. She finished second when favourite for the St. Leger Stakes and ended her racing career by finishing unplaced in the Prix de l'Arc de Triomphe, but was rated the best three-year-old filly of the season in Europe. She was then retired to stud, where she had some success as a broodmare.

== Background ==
Diminuendo was a chestnut filly with a white star and three white socks, bred in Kentucky by Nancy Dillman. She was from the first crop of foals sired by Diesis, a British-bred stallion who was the top-rated two-year-old in Europe in 1982. Diesis went on to become a successful breeding stallion, and though based at Mill Ridge Stud in Kentucky, he had his greatest successes in Europe: his best winners included Love Divine, Ramruma, Elmaamul and Halling. Diminuendo's dam, the American-bred mare Cacti, also produced Pricket, a filly who finished second in the 1996 Epsom Oaks.

Diminuendo was bought by Mohammed bin Rashid Al Maktoum (always known as "Sheikh Mohammed" in racing circles) and was sent to be trained by Henry Cecil at his Warren Place Stables in Newmarket. The filly was ridden in all her major victories by the American jockey Steve Cauthen.

== Racing career ==
=== 1987: two-year-old season ===
As a two-year-old in 1987, Diminuendo was undefeated in four races, beginning with a maiden race at Leicester Racecourse in June, in which she was ridden by Willie Ryan and won by ten lengths despite starting slowly. In late June she won the six furlong Ewar Stud Farm Stakes on the July course at Newmarket Racecourse by 2 1/2 lengths and in July she returned to the same course and distance for the Group Three Cherry Hinton Stakes and won at odds of 6/4 from Magic of Life, a filly who went on to win the Mill Reef Stakes against colts and the Group One Coronation Stakes. In September, Diminuendo was moved up in distance and class for the Fillies' Mile at Ascot Racecourse. Starting at odds of 2/1 she won from Haiati with the subsequent Prix Marcel Boussac winner Ashayer in third place. Despite her success, Cecil reportedly felt that the filly was past her best for the season.

=== 1988: three-year-old season ===
On her three-year-old debut, Diminuendo started 7/4 favourite for the Nell Gwyn Stakes, a trial race for the 1000 Guineas, over seven furlongs at Newmarket on 12 April. She was restrained by Cauthen in the early stages and despite making progress in the closing stages she was beaten three quarters of a length by Ghariba, to whom she was conceding five pounds. Sudden Love and Ela Romara, the fillies in third and fourth place, went on to win the E. P. Taylor Stakes and the Nassau Stakes respectively. On 28 April, Diminuendo started the 6/1 second favourite for the 175th running of the 1000 Guineas over Newmarket's Rowley Mile. In a change of tactics, Cauthen sent the filly into the lead from the start, but in the final quarter mile she was overtaken and beaten into third place by Ravinella and Dabaweyaa. Twelve days after her defeat at Newmarket, Diminuendo was moved up in distance for the Musidora Stakes over 10 1/2 furlongs at York. Startin the 8/13 favourited, she took the lead three furlongs from the finish and accelerated clear of the field to win impressively by four lengths from Asl, with Princess Genista five lengths back in third.

On 4 June, Diminuendo was one of eleven fillies to contest the 210th running of the Oaks Stakes (known for sponsorship reasons as the Gold Seal Oaks) over 1 1/2 miles at Epsom Downs Racecourse. She was made 7/4 favourite ahead of Dabaweyaa and the Prix Cléopâtre winner Indian Rose. Diminuendo turned into the straight before accelerating into the lead approaching the final quarter mile. She drew clear in the closing stages to win by four lengths from Sudden Love, with the French-trained Animatrice in third. Five weeks after her win at Epsom, Diminuendo started the 2/9 favourite for the Irish Oaks at the Curragh. Diminuendo was held up by Cauthen in the early stages before moving up to join the leaders in the straight but soon came under pressure and it was only in the final strides that she caught the Michael Stoute-trained Melodist to force a dead heat. Melodist, the winner of the Oaks d'Italia was also owned by Sheikh Mohammed, whose Kildangan Stud sponsored the race. At York in August, only five fillies appeared to oppose Diminuendo in the Yorkshire Oaks. Starting the 30/100 favourite, she was never in danger of defeat and won impressively by five lengths from Sudden Love.

At Doncaster Racecourse on 10 September, Diminuendo was matched against colts for the first time in the St Leger Stakes over 14 1/2 furlongs. Ridden by Walter Swinburn (Cauthen was injured), she was made odds-on favourite, but was beaten a length by the colt Minster Son. She was expected to be retired after the Leger, but Cecil allowed the filly to travel to Longchamp Racecourse for the Prix de l'Arc de Triomphe, for which she was well-fancied despite an unfavourable draw. After reaching fourth place early in the straight she faded in the closing stages and finished tenth behind Tony Bin.

== Assessment and honours ==
The independent Timeform organisation gave Diminuendo a rating of 126 in 1988, making her the highest-rated three-year-old filly. In the same year, she was also the top-rated filly of her generation in Europe on the official International Classification. In their book, A Century of Champions, based on the Timeform rating system, John Randall and Tony Morris rated Diminuendo an "average" winner of the Oaks.

== Stud record ==
Diminuendo was retired from racing to become a broodmare for her owners Darley Stud and died in 2010. She was not a great success but produced at least three winners, one of whom won at Group race level:

- Carpathian (bay colt 1991, by Danzig), won five races
- Calando (bay filly 1996, by Storm Cat), won May Hill Stakes
- Knight's Victory (bay colt 2006, by Cape Cross), won one race

== Pedigree ==
Pedigree of Diminuendo (USA), chestnut mare, 1985
Sire Diesis (GB) 1980	Sharpen Up (GB); 1969	Atan	Native Dancer
Sire Diesis (GB) 1980	Sharpen Up (GB); 1969	Atan	Mixed Marriage
Sire Diesis (GB) 1980	Sharpen Up (GB); 1969	Rocchetta	Rockfella
Sire Diesis (GB) 1980	Sharpen Up (GB); 1969	Rocchetta	Chambiges
Sire Diesis (GB) 1980	Doubly Sure (GB); 1971	Reliance	Tantieme
Sire Diesis (GB) 1980	Doubly Sure (GB); 1971	Reliance	Relance
Sire Diesis (GB) 1980	Doubly Sure (GB); 1971	Soft Angels	Crepello
Sire Diesis (GB) 1980	Doubly Sure (GB); 1971	Soft Angels	Sweet Angel
Dam Cacti (USA) 1977	Tom Rolfe (USA); 1962	Ribot	Tenerani
Dam Cacti (USA) 1977	Tom Rolfe (USA); 1962	Ribot	Romanella
Dam Cacti (USA) 1977	Tom Rolfe (USA); 1962	Pocahontas	Roman
Dam Cacti (USA) 1977	Tom Rolfe (USA); 1962	Pocahontas	How
Dam Cacti (USA) 1977	Desert Love (USA); 1962	Amerigo	Nearco
Dam Cacti (USA) 1977	Desert Love (USA); 1962	Amerigo	Sanlinea
Dam Cacti (USA) 1977	Desert Love (USA); 1962	Desert Vision	Roman
Dam Cacti (USA) 1977	Desert Love (USA); 1962	Desert Vision	Desert Sun (Family: 1-d)
