= 2010 Cheltenham Gold Cup =

The 2010 Cheltenham Gold Cup was a horse race which took place at Cheltenham on Friday 19 March 2010. It was the 82nd running of the Cheltenham Gold Cup, and it was won by Imperial Commander. The winner was ridden by Paddy Brennan and trained by Nigel Twiston-Davies. The pre-race favourite Kauto Star fell at fence 19.

== Race details ==
- Sponsor: Totesport
- Winner's prize money: £270,797.50
- Going: Good (Good to Soft in places)
- Number of runners: 11
- Winner's time: 6m 43.90s

== Full result ==
	*	Horse	Age	Jockey	Trainer ^{†}	SP
1		Imperial Commander	9	Paddy Brennan	Nigel Twiston-Davies	7/1
2	7	Denman	10	Tony McCoy	Paul Nicholls	4/1
3	23	Mon Mome	10	Aidan Coleman	Venetia Williams	50/1
4	shd	Carruthers	7	Mattie Batchelor	Mark Bradstock	33/1
5	¾	Cooldine	8	Paul Townend	Willie Mullins (IRE)	10/1
6	8	Calgary Bay	7	Graham Lee	Henrietta Knight	50/1
7	12	My Will	10	Nick Scholfield	Paul Nicholls	80/1
8	10	Cerium	9	Davy Russell	Paul Murphy	200/1
9	45	Tricky Trickster	7	Barry Geraghty	Paul Nicholls	12/1
10	35	Mr Pointment	11	Ken Whelan	Paul Murphy	250/1
Fell	Fence 19	Kauto Star	10	Ruby Walsh	Paul Nicholls	8/11 fav

* The distances between the horses are shown in lengths or shorter. shd = short-head
† Trainers are based in Great Britain unless indicated

== Winner's details ==
Further details of the winner, Imperial Commander:

- Foaled: 21 May 2001 in Ireland
- Sire: Flemensfirth; Dam: Ballinlovane (Le Moss)
- Owner: Our Friends in the North
- Breeder: Laurence J. Flynn
