= Paddy Brennan (jockey) =

Irish jockey

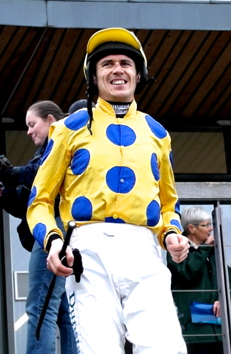
Paddy brennan at Aintree 2012

Paddy Brennan (born 13 April 1981) is a retired Irish jump jockey. He was champion conditional jockey in the 2004/05 season and won the 2010 Cheltenham Gold Cup on Imperial Commander. He was based in Gloucestershire as stable jockey at Fergal O'Brien's yard for several years before his retirement in April 2024.

== Early life ==
A native of Ardrahan, County Galway, Brennan was a keen GAA player with dreams of becoming a county hurler. Although not from a racing background, he had a pony and went hunting. Brennan started out in racing at the yard of trainer Jim Bolger with the intention of being a flat jockey but decided to switch to jumps on account of his weight. He moved to the UK in 2000 to join Paul Nicholl's stable at Ditcheat, Somerset.

== Career ==
In the 2004/05 season Brennan became champion conditional jockey and achieved his first Grade 1 success with Ashley Brook in the Maghull Novices' Chase at Aintree in April. His first win at the Cheltenham Festival came in 2006, when he rode 40/1 outsider Shamayoun to victory in the Fred Winter Juvenile Novices' Handicap Hurdle. He rode more than a century of winners in a season for the first time in 2007/08.

In November 2008 Brennan had his first ride on Imperial Commander for Nigel Twiston-Davies, winning the Paddy Power Gold Cup at Cheltenham. In March 2009 the partnership was successful in the Ryanair Chase at the Cheltenham Festival, and the following year they won the Cheltenham Gold Cup, beating Denman by 7 lengths, the favourite Kauto Star having fallen four out. After the race Brennan said "It's by far the best day of my life. I'm speechless. It was a dream the whole way". Later that day, Brennan rode Pigeon Island to victory in the Johnny Henderson Grand Annual Chase. When Pigeon Island retired from racing, Brennan gave him a home.

In April 2015, Brennan achieved his best placing in the Grand National, when 25/1 chance Saint Are, trained by Tom George, came second to Many Clouds. In October 2015 Brennan rode the Colin Tizzard-trained Cue Card for the first time, winning the Charlie Hall Chase at Wetherby. He went on to partner Cue Card in a further 14 races, with victories in five races, all of them at Grade 1 level. There were however disappointments in the Cheltenham Gold Cup, when Cue Card fell at the same fence, 3 out, in 2016 and 2017.

On 16 November 2016 Brennan rode his 1,000th winner on Colin's Sister at Warwick. He rode his 1,500th winner on Teonie at Catterick on 19 December 2023.

Brennan retired from race riding on 17 April 2024, bowing out with a winning ride on Manothepeople for O'Brien in a handicap chase at Cheltenham. He said: "It's time for the next generation of jockeys... It's a tough gig... Being a jockey is 95 per cent disappointment and I've had that but I'm ready for the next chapter." He had ridden 1,525 winners in Britain and Ireland, including 18 Grade 1 wins.

== Awards ==
In 2005 Brennan won a Lester Award for conditional jockey of the year. In 2022 he won a Lester for jump ride of the year winner, for his ride on Knight Salute in the Anniversary 4-Y-O Novices' Hurdle at Aintree on 7 April 2022.

== Personal life ==
Brennan married nurse Lindsey Hunting in 2013 and has three children, called Jack, Ollie, and Chloe Brennan. Nacarat, winner of the Betway Bowl at Aintree in 2011, was a guest at the wedding reception.

== Cheltenham Festival wins (6) ==
- Cheltenham Gold Cup - (1) Imperial Commander (2010)
- Stayers' Hurdle - (1) Inglis Drever (2007)
- Ryanair Chase - (1) Imperial Commander (2009)
- Fred Winter Juvenile Novices' Handicap Hurdle - (1) Shamayoun (2006)
- Pertemps Final - (1) Ballyfitz (2008)
- Johnny Henderson Grand Annual Chase - (1) Pigeon Island (2010)

== Other major wins ==
(United Kingdom) Great Britain

- Betfair Chase - (3) Imperial Commander (2010), Cue Card (2015, 2016)
- Kauto Star Novices' Chase - (1) Royal Vacation (2016)
- King George VI Chase - (1) Cue Card (2015)
- Challow Novices' Hurdle - (1) Poetic Rhythm (2018)
- Ascot Chase - (1) Cue Card (2017)
- Manifesto Novices' Chase - (1) Tartak (2009)
- Betway Bowl - (2) Naccarat (2011), Cue Card (2016)
- Aintree Hurdle - (1) Khyber Kim (2010)
- Melling Chase - (1) God's Own (2016)
- Sefton Novices' Hurdle - (1) Pettifour (2008)
- Mersey Novices' Hurdle - (1) Tidal Bay (2007)
- Anniversary 4-Y-O Novices' Hurdle - (1) Knight Salute (2022)
- Maghull Novices' Chase - (1) Ashley Brook (2005)

(Republic of Ireland) Ireland

- Punchestown Champion Chase - (1) God's Own (2016)
