= Festival Trophy Chase =

Steeplechase horse race in Britain

- Class: Grade 1
- Location: Cheltenham Racecourse; Cheltenham, England
- Inaugurated: 2005
- Race type: Chase
- Sponsor: Ryanair
- Website: Cheltenham

Race information
- Distance: 2m 4f 127y (4,139 metres)
- Surface: Turf
- Track: Left-handed
- Qualification: Five-years-old and up
- Weight: 11 st 8 lb (5yo); 11 st 10 lb (6yo+); Allowances; 7 lb for mares
- Purse: £375,000(2023); 1st: £211,013

Festival Trophy Chase
2026
Heart Wood	Jonbon	Banbridge

Previous years
2025
Fact To File	Heart Wood	Envoi Allen
2024
Protektorat	Envoi Allen	Conflated
2023
Envoi Allen	Shishkin	Hitman
2022
Allaho	Janidil	Eldorado Allen
2021
Allaho	Fakir D'Oudairies	Tornado Flyer

2020-2011
2020
Min	Saint Calvados	A Plus Tard
2019
Frodon	Aso	Road To Respect
2018
Balko Des Flos	Un De Sceaux	Cloudy Dream
2017
Un De Sceaux	Sub Lieutenant	Aso
2016
Vautour	Valseur Lido	Road To Riches
2015
Uxizandre	Ma Filleule	Don Cossack
2014
Dynaste	Hidden Cyclone	Rajdhani Express
2013
Cue Card	First Lieutenant	For Non Stop
2012
Riverside Theatre	Albertas Run	Medermit
2011
Albertas Run	Kalahari King	Rubi Light

2010-2005
2010
Albertas Run	Poquelin	J'y Vole
2009
Imperial Commander	Voy Por Ustedes	Schindlers Hunt
2008
Our Vic	Mossbank	Turko
2007
Taranis	Our Vic	Billyvoddan
2006
Fondmort	Lacdoudal	Impek
2005
Thisthatandtother	Fondmort	Rathgar Beau

The Festival Trophy Chase (currently known for sponsorship reasons as the Ryanair Chase) is a Grade 1 National Hunt steeplechase in Great Britain which is open to horses aged five years or older. It is run on the New Course at Cheltenham over a distance of about 2 miles and 4½ furlongs (2 miles 4 furlongs and 127 yards, or 4,139 metres), and during its running there are seventeen fences to be jumped. The race is scheduled to take place each year during the Cheltenham Festival in March.

It was one of several new races introduced at the Festival when a fourth day was added to the meeting in 2005. Prior to this there had been a similar event at the Festival called the Cathcart Challenge Cup, but this was restricted to first and second-season chasers only.

The race was initially classed at Grade 2 level. The inaugural running was sponsored by the Daily Telegraph, and since then it has been backed by Ryanair. As a result, the race is normally referred to as the Ryanair Chase. The event has held Grade 1 status since 2008.

== Records ==
Most successful horse (2 wins):

- Albertas Run – 2010, 2011
- Allaho - 2021, 2022

Leading jockey (4 wins):

- Ruby Walsh – Thisthatandtother (2005), Taranis (2007), Vautour (2016), Un De Sceaux (2017)

Leading trainer (6 wins):

- Willie Mullins - Vautour (2016), Un de Sceaux (2017), Min (2020), Allaho (2021, 2022), Fact To File (2025)

== Winners ==
Year	Winner	Age	Jockey	Trainer
2005	Thisthatandtother	9	Ruby Walsh	Paul Nicholls
2006	Fondmort	10	Mick Fitzgerald	Nicky Henderson
2007	Taranis	6	Ruby Walsh	Paul Nicholls
2008	Our Vic	10	Timmy Murphy	David Pipe
2009	Imperial Commander	8	Paddy Brennan	Nigel Twiston-Davies
2010	Albertas Run	9	Tony McCoy	Jonjo O'Neill
2011	Albertas Run	10	Tony McCoy	Jonjo O'Neill
2012	Riverside Theatre	8	Barry Geraghty	Nicky Henderson
2013	Cue Card	7	Joe Tizzard	Colin Tizzard
2014	Dynaste	8	Tom Scudamore	David Pipe
2015	Uxizandre	7	Tony McCoy	Alan King
2016	Vautour	7	Ruby Walsh	Willie Mullins
2017	Un de Sceaux	9	Ruby Walsh	Willie Mullins
2018	Balko des Flos	7	Davy Russell	Henry de Bromhead
2019	Frodon	7	Bryony Frost	Paul Nicholls
2020	Min	9	Paul Townend	Willie Mullins
2021	Allaho	7	Rachael Blackmore	Willie Mullins
2022	Allaho	8	Paul Townend	Willie Mullins
2023	Envoi Allen	9	Rachael Blackmore	Henry De Bromhead
2024	Protektorat	9	Harry Skelton	Dan Skelton
2025	Fact To File	8	Mark Walsh	Willie Mullins
2026	Heart Wood	8	Darragh O'Keeffe	Henry De Bromhead

== See also ==
- Horse racing in Great Britain
- List of British National Hunt races
- Recurring sporting events established in 2005 – the Ryanair Chase is included under its registered title, Festival Trophy.
