= Legal Case =

Irish-bred Thoroughbred racehorse

- Sire: Alleged
- Grandsire: Hoist The Flag
- Dam: Maryinsky
- Damsire: Northern Dancer
- Sex: Stallion
- Foaled: 18 April 1986
- Country: Ireland
- Colour: Bay
- Breeder: Ovidstown Investments
- Owner: Gordon White
- Trainer: Luca Cumani
- Record: 14: 6-1-1
- Earnings: £458,421

Major wins
- Select Stakes (1989); Champion Stakes (1989); Premio Roma (1990)

Legal Case (18 April 1986 – after 2006) was an Irish-bred British-trained Thoroughbred racehorse and sire. He did not appear until the summer of his three-year-old season, but then made rapid progress, winning two minor races and the Select Stakes before recording his biggest win in the Champion Stakes in October 1989. He was never as good again, but did win the Premio Roma in 1990. After his retirement from racing, he had some success as a breeding stallion in Brazil.

== Background ==
Legal Case was a bay horse with no white markings bred in Ireland by Ovidstown Investments Ltd. He was sired by the dual Prix de l'Arc de Triomphe winner Alleged out of the mare Maryinsky. Alleged was a successful stallion, and a strong influence for stamina: his best winners included Miss Alleged, Shantou, Law Society and Midway Lady. Maryinsky won two minor races at Del Mar racetrack in 1980. Apart from Legal Case, Maryinsky also produced La Sky, the dam of The Oaks winner Love Divine who in turn produced the St Leger Stakes winner Sixties Icon.

During his racing career, Legal Case was owned by the businessman Sir Gordon White (later Baron White of Hull) and trained at the Bedford House stable in Newmarket by Luca Cumani.

== Racing career ==
=== 1989: three-year-old season ===
Legal Case was unraced as a two-year-old and did not appear on a racecourse until June 1989, when he contested a maiden race over eight and a half furlongs at Beverley Racecourse. Ridden by Ray Cochrane he started 8/11 favourite and recovered from a slow start to win by three quarters of a length from Enigma with the pair finishing ten lengths clear of the other twelve runners. A month later, he was ridden by Frankie Dettori when he started 2/9 for a graduation race (for horses with no more than one previous win) at Windsor Racecourse and won by six lengths from Silly Habit. Cochrane regained the ride when Legal Case was moved up in class for the Listed Winter Hill Stakes at Windsor in August, in which he was matched against older horses for the first time. He started favourite but was beaten three lengths by the Michael Stoute-trained colt Dolpour, with Opening Verse finishing fifth of the seven runners.

In September, Legal Case was moved up to Group Three class for the Select Stakes over ten furlongs at Goodwood Racecourse. Ridden by Dettori he started the 7/4 favourite against four opponents. After being restrained in the early stages, he took the lead a furlong out and drew away to win by four lengths from Greenwich Papillon, with Indian Queen three lengths back in third place. The colt was then moved up to the highest level when he was sent to France to contest the 68th running of the Prix de l'Arc de Triomphe over 2,400 m (7,900 ft) at Longchamp Racecourse on 8 October. Starting at odds of 18/1 he was towards the rear of the nineteen-runner field for most of the way before making steady progress in the straight and finishing eighth, less than five lengths behind the winner Carroll House.

Less than two weeks after his run at Longchamp, Legal Case, ridden by Cochrane, was one of eleven horses to contest the Champion Stakes over ten furlongs at Newmarket Racecourse. Dolpour was made favourite on 4/1 with Legal Case 5/1 second choice in the betting alongside the four-year-old Ile de Chypre, the winner of the Juddmonte International. The other contenders included the Dewhurst Stakes winner Scenic, the improving handicapper Braashee, the Royal Lodge Stakes winner High Estate and Ile de Nisky (fourth in The Derby). Ile de Chypre led from the start, with Legal Case being restrained towards the rear of the field, before making progress in the last quarter mile on the stands side (the left side from the jockeys' viewpoint). Inside the final furlong the three-year-olds Dolpour, Legal Case and Scenic moved up to challenge Ile de Chypre, although Scenic was squeezed for room and failed to maintain his run. The final strides saw Dolpour, Ile de Chypre and Legal Case racing neck-and-neck before crossing the line together. After a photo finish, Legal Case was declared the winner by a head from Dolpour, with Ile de Chypre a short head away in third.

=== 1990: four-year-old season ===
In 1990 Dettori took over from Cochrane as Cumani's stable jockey. Legal Case remained in training as a four-year-old, but did not appear until the Royal Ascot meeting in June, when he finished fourth behind Batshoof, Relief Pitcher and Terimon in the Prince of Wales's Stakes. He started favourite for the Princess of Wales's Stakes at Newmarket on 10 July but never looked likely to win and finished fifth of the seven runners behind Sapience. Eighteen days later he started at odds of 14/1 for the King George VI and Queen Elizabeth Stakes at Ascot but made no impact and came home tenth of the eleven runners. The colt showed better form when he returned in autumn. In his second attempt at the Arc de Triomphe, he finished sixth of the twenty-one runners, six lengths behind the winner Saumarez. When bidding to win a second Champion Stakes on 20 October, he stayed on well in the closing stages to take third place behind In the Groove and Linamix. On his final appearance, Legal Case was sent to Italy for the Group One Premio Roma over 2000 metres on heavy ground at Capannelle Racecourse on 10 November. Ridden as in all his races that year by Dettori he won by two lengths and 1 1/2 lengths from Candy Glen (Gran Criterium, Premio Parioli, Prix Daphnis) and Sikeston (Gran Criterium, Premio Parioli, Premio Ribot).

=== 1991: five-year-old season ===
Training problems kept Legal Case off the racecourse for most of the 1991 season and he made only two appearances in late autumn. On 29 October, he started odds-favourite against three opponents in a minor race at Salisbury Racecourse and won by 3 1/2 lengths from the Bosphorus Trophy winner Maraakiz. On his final start he returned to Rome for the Premio Roma in November but finished fifth of eleven behind Sikeston.

== Stud career ==
At the end of his racing career, Legal Case was exported to become a breeding stallion in Brazil. His last foals were born in 2007. The best of his offspring included Evil Knievel, a Grade I winner in Brazil and Virginie, who won the Beverly Hills Handicap at Hollywood Park Racetrack in 1999.

== Pedigree ==
Pedigree of Legal Case (IRE), bay stallion, 1986
Sire Alleged (USA) 1974	Hoist The Flag (USA); 1968	Tom Rolfe	Ribot
Sire Alleged (USA) 1974	Hoist The Flag (USA); 1968	Tom Rolfe	Pocahontas
Sire Alleged (USA) 1974	Hoist The Flag (USA); 1968	Wavy Navy	War Admiral*
Sire Alleged (USA) 1974	Hoist The Flag (USA); 1968	Wavy Navy	Triomphe
Sire Alleged (USA) 1974	Princess Pout (USA); 1966	Prince John	Princequillo*
Sire Alleged (USA) 1974	Princess Pout (USA); 1966	Prince John	Not Afraid
Sire Alleged (USA) 1974	Princess Pout (USA); 1966	Determined Lady	Determine
Sire Alleged (USA) 1974	Princess Pout (USA); 1966	Determined Lady	Tumbling*
Dam Maryinsky (USA) 1977	Northern Dancer (CAN); 1961	Nearctic	Nearco*
Dam Maryinsky (USA) 1977	Northern Dancer (CAN); 1961	Nearctic	Lady Angela
Dam Maryinsky (USA) 1977	Northern Dancer (CAN); 1961	Natalma	Native Dancer
Dam Maryinsky (USA) 1977	Northern Dancer (CAN); 1961	Natalma	Almahmoud
Dam Maryinsky (USA) 1977	Extra Place (USA); 1963	Round Table	Princequillo*
Dam Maryinsky (USA) 1977	Extra Place (USA); 1963	Round Table	Knights Daughter
Dam Maryinsky (USA) 1977	Extra Place (USA); 1963	Rich Relation	Midas
Dam Maryinsky (USA) 1977	Extra Place (USA); 1963	Rich Relation	Sybil's Sister* (Family:14-c)

* Legal Case is inbred 4S x 4D to the stallion Princequillo, meaning that he appears fourth generation on the sire side of his pedigree and fourth generation on the dam side of his pedigree.

* Legal Case is inbred 4S x 5S to the stallion War Admiral, meaning that he appears fourth generation and fifth generation (via Tumbling) on the sire side of his pedigree.

* Legal Case is inbred 4D x 5D to the stallion Nearco, meaning that he appears fourth generation and fifth generation (via Sybil's Sister) on the dam side of his pedigree.
