= Hoist The Flag =

American-bred Thoroughbred racehorse

- Sire: Tom Rolfe
- Grandsire: Ribot
- Dam: Wavy Navy
- Damsire: War Admiral
- Sex: Stallion
- Foaled: 1968
- Country: United States
- Colour: Bay
- Breeder: John M. Schiff
- Owner: Jane Forbes Clark I
- Trainer: Sidney Watters, Jr.
- Record: 6: 5-0-0
- Earnings: US$78,145

Major wins
- Cowdin Stakes (1970); Bay Shore Stakes (1971)

Awards
- American Champion Two-Year-Old Colt (1970); Leading broodmare sire in North America (1987)

Hoist The Flag (1968–1980) was an American Champion Thoroughbred racehorse. He was the outstanding two-year-old colt in the United States in 1970 when his wins included the Cowdin Stakes. Hoist The Flag was being prepared for the Triple Crown races when his career was ended by a leg injury. He subsequently became a highly successful and influential breeding stallion.

== Background ==
Hoist The Flag was a dark-coated bay horse with a small white star, bred by New York City Investment banker, John Schiff. Hoist The Flag was out of the mare Wavy Navy, a daughter of the 1937 U.S. Triple Crown champion, War Admiral. His sire was Tom Rolfe, the 1965 American Champion Three-Year-Old Male Horse and a son of the undefeated European superstar, Ribot.

Hoist The Flag was purchased as a yearling for $37,000 by Jane Forbes Clark I (née Wilbur), wife of noted philanthropist Stephen C. Clark, Jr. who also owned and raced top steeplechase horses. The colt's race conditioning was handled by future U.S. Racing Hall of Fame trainer, Sidney Watters, Jr. and his jockey was Jean Cruguet, who six years later would ride Seattle Slew to a U.S. Triple Crown championship.

== Racing career ==
As a two-year-old, Hoist The Flag dominated his age group and was the heavy winterbook favorite for the 1971 Kentucky Derby. Hoist The Flag finished first by several lengths in each of his four starts but in the Champagne Stakes was disqualified from first and set back to last for interference during the early stages of the race. He came out of the race with sore shins and was sent to recuperate at facilities in Camden, South Carolina. He was voted the 1970 American Champion Two-Year-Old Colt.

For 1971, Hoist The Flag was assigned highweight of 126 pounds on The Jockey Club's Experimental Free Handicap. He did not return to racing until March 12, 1971, when he blew away the competition by 15 lengths in an overnight race at Bowie Race Track. In his next start on March 20, the colt won the Bay Shore Stakes at Aqueduct Racetrack by seven lengths while setting a new track record. No three-year-old had ever run seven furlongs faster than the 1:21 Hoist The Flag clocked in winning the Bay Shore.

On March 30, 1971, Hoist The Flag was at Belmont Park where he was scheduled to run in the Gotham Stakes as a tune-up before the Kentucky Derby. Following a five furlong workout, the colt took a misstep and broke his right hind leg in two places, suffering a shattered pastern and a fractured cannon bone that ended his racing career and put his life in jeopardy. Veterinary Surgeons performed a bone graft, using screws and metal plates to secure the breaks then created the first ever fiberglass cast to wrap around the horse's leg. While Hoist The Flag eventually recovered, in 2006, Kentucky Derby winner Barbaro would suffer a very similar injury but following surgery developed laminitis and had to be euthanized.

== Stud record ==
Following his recovery from surgery, Hoist The Flag was sent to stand at stud at Claiborne Farm near Paris, Kentucky where he sired 254 live foals. Successful as a sire and as a broodmare sire, he was the leading juvenile sire in North America in 1981 and the leading broodmare sire in 1987. Among his notable offspring, Hoist The Flag was the sire of:

- Alleged (f. 1974) - 1977 European Horse of the Year, two-time winner of the Prix de l'Arc de Triomphe (1977, 1978)
- Sensational (f. 1974) - multiple Grade 1 winner, American Champion Two-Year-Old Filly
- Hoist The King (f. 1979) – sold for record-setting $1.6 at Keeneland Sales in 1979
- Linkage (f. 1979) - won 1982 Blue Grass Stakes, 2nd Preakness Stakes
- Stalwart (f. 1979) - won Norfolk Stakes, Hollywood Futurity

Hoist The Flag was the damsire of:

- Broad Brush (f. 1983) - multiple stakes winner of US$2,656,793, Leading sire in North America (1994)
- Personal Flag (f. 1983) - multiple Grade 1 winner, career earnings of US$1,258,924
- Cryptoclearance (f. 1984) - Multiple Grade 1 winner, career earnings of US$3,376,327
- Personal Ensign (f. 1984) - U.S. Racing Hall of Fame inductee who won the 1988 Breeders' Cup Distaff and retired undefeated in thirteen starts
- Sacahuista (f. 1984) - won 1987 Breeders' Cup Distaff, American Champion Three-Year-Old Filly, career earnings of US$1,298,842

Hoist the Flag died in 1980 and is buried at Claiborne Farm.

== Assessment ==
In a 2004 televised interview, jockey Jean Cruguet, perhaps best known for his Triple Crown victory on Seattle Slew, said Hoist The Flag was the best horse he ever rode.

Jockey Jean Cruguet would reiterate and amplify his remarks in an August 2011 interview with Brisnet.

"Hoist the Flag was the best horse I ever rode, by far... It wasn't Seattle Slew. The first time I ever got on Hoist the Flag (as a two-year-old), I told everyone I knew that I was going to win the Kentucky Derby with this horse. The only reason I didn't say 'the Triple Crown' was because I was so new in this county I didn't even know what the Triple Crown was. I'd never even heard of it. If he hadn't broke down (early in his three-year-old season but eventually saved for stud duties), Hoist the Flag would have been 1-9 to win the Triple Crown. "Seattle Slew was a top miler, and because he was so much better than everyone else that year he was able to win the Triple Crown, but Hoist the Flag would have beat everyone else going any distance at any time. He was just that much better than everyone else."

== Sire line tree ==
- Hoist The Flag
  - Alleged
    - Montelimar
      - Monty's Pass
      - Hedgehunter
    - Law Society
      - Approach the Bench
      - Fortune's Wheel
      - Homme de Loi
      - Right Win
      - Court of Honour
      - Anzillero
      - Catch Me
    - Leading Counsel
      - Rodock
      - Dun Doire
      - Justified
      - Knockara Beau
    - Hours After
    - Legal Case
      - Evil Knievel
    - Strategic Choice
      - Bog Warrior
      - Grey Gold
    - Flemensfirth
      - Joe Lively
      - Imperial Commander
      - Tidal Bay
      - Pandorama
      - Flemenstar
      - Lostintranslation
      - Tornado Flyer
    - Flat Top
    - Shantou
      - Ballynagour
      - Morning Assembly
      - Briar Hill
      - Beware The Bear
      - Death Duty
      - The Storyteller
      - Something Soon
      - Run Wild Fred
      - Jim Key
  - Delta Flag
  - Salutely
    - Make Me A Champ
  - Hoist The King
  - Linkage
  - Stalwart
    - Kingpost
    - Stalwars
    - Stalwart Charger
    - Sacred Honour

== Pedigree ==
Pedigree of Hoist The Flag (USA), bay stallion' 1968
Sire Tom Rolfe	Ribot	Tenerani	Bellini
Sire Tom Rolfe	Ribot	Tenerani	Tofanella
Sire Tom Rolfe	Ribot	Romanella	El Greco
Sire Tom Rolfe	Ribot	Romanella	Barbara Burrini
Sire Tom Rolfe	Pocahontas	Roman	Sir Gallahad
Sire Tom Rolfe	Pocahontas	Roman	Buckup
Sire Tom Rolfe	Pocahontas	How	Princequillo
Sire Tom Rolfe	Pocahontas	How	The Squaw
Dam Wavy Navy	War Admiral	Man o' War	Fair Play
Dam Wavy Navy	War Admiral	Man o' War	Mahubah
Dam Wavy Navy	War Admiral	Brushup	Sweep
Dam Wavy Navy	War Admiral	Brushup	Annette K.
Dam Wavy Navy	Triomphe	Tourbillon	Ksar
Dam Wavy Navy	Triomphe	Tourbillon	Durban
Dam Wavy Navy	Triomphe	Melibee	Firdaussi
Dam Wavy Navy	Triomphe	Melibee	Metairie
