= Imperial Commander (horse) =

Irish-bred Thoroughbred racehorse

- Racing silks of Our Friends in the North
- Sire: Flemensfirth
- Dam: Ballinlovane
- Damsire: Le Moss
- Sex: Male
- Foaled: 29 March 2001
- Died: 6 April 2017 (aged 16)
- Country: Ireland
- Colour: Bay
- Breeder: Owen Flynn & Laurence Flynn
- Owner: Our Friends in the North
- Trainer: Nigel Twiston-Davies
- Record: 21: 8-2-1
- Earnings: £621,331

Major wins
- Paddy Power Gold Cup (2008); Ryanair Chase (2009); Cheltenham Gold Cup (2010); Betfair Chase (2010)
- Last updated on 13 April 2013

Imperial Commander (29 March 2001 – 6 April 2017) was a Cheltenham Gold Cup winning thoroughbred racehorse.

== Racing career ==
=== Early career ===
Imperial Commander's first race was at Summerhill point-to-point in Ireland on 24 April 2005, a race he won by 8 lengths.

His next racecourse appearance and first under rules was a National Hunt flat race at Cheltenham on 25 October 2006. This too he won, and already he was being described as a 'future chaser on looks' by the Racing Post.

He garnered one victory over hurdles, a £2000 race at Newcastle in January 2007, but failed to win at Graded level, including attempts at the 2007 Cheltenham and Aintree festivals (although he was placed at the latter).

=== As a steeplechaser ===
As predicted by the Racing Post, it was as a chaser that his career really took off. He was victorious in his first two chases, both at Cheltenham in late 2007, and he won again in the Paddy Power Gold Cup at Cheltenham in November 2008, when he was ridden by Paddy Brennan for the first time. Returning to the Cheltenham Festival in 2009, he won the Ryanair Chase by 2 lengths from Voy Por Ustedes at odds of 6/1.

The following season he met former Cheltenham Gold Cup champion, Kauto Star, in the 2009 Betfair Chase at Haydock, and was beaten by a mere nose. He was less successful in that season's King George where he was below par, trailing in a 64 length 5th to the same horse, after nearly unseating Brennan at the second fence.

At Cheltenham the following March, he got his revenge. Again ridden by Paddy Brennan, Imperial Commander won the 2010 Cheltenham Gold Cup, beating favourites and previous champions Kauto Star and Denman.

Defending his title in 2011, he hit the fourth-last fence and was soon pulled up. He was found to be lame, and was not seen again on a racecourse for nearly two years.

A comeback second in the 2013 Argento Chase at Cheltenham showed he was 'set to remain competitive in top company' and a tilt at the Grand National was mooted. Thus, as a 12-year-old, Imperial Commander ran in the 2013 Grand National as the top weight, ridden by his trainer's son, Sam Twiston-Davies. He went well for a circuit but dropped away quickly soon after and was pulled up.

== Pedigree ==
Pedigree of Imperial Commander, bay gelding, 21 May 2001
Sire Flemensfirth (USA) 1992	Alleged (USA) 1974	Hoist The Flag (USA) 1968	Tom Rolfe 1962
Sire Flemensfirth (USA) 1992	Alleged (USA) 1974	Hoist The Flag (USA) 1968	Wavy Navy
Sire Flemensfirth (USA) 1992	Alleged (USA) 1974	Princess Pout 1966	Prince John (USA)
Sire Flemensfirth (USA) 1992	Alleged (USA) 1974	Princess Pout 1966	Determined Lady
Sire Flemensfirth (USA) 1992	Etheldreda (USA) 1985	Diesis 1980	Sharpen Up 1969
Sire Flemensfirth (USA) 1992	Etheldreda (USA) 1985	Diesis 1980	Doubly Sure 1971
Sire Flemensfirth (USA) 1992	Etheldreda (USA) 1985	Royal Bund (USA)	Royal Coinage
Sire Flemensfirth (USA) 1992	Etheldreda (USA) 1985	Royal Bund (USA)	Nato
Dam Ballinlovane	Le Moss 1975	Le Levanstell 1957	Le Lavandou
Dam Ballinlovane	Le Moss 1975	Le Levanstell 1957	Stella's Sister
Dam Ballinlovane	Le Moss 1975	Feemoss 1960	Ballymoss 1954
Dam Ballinlovane	Le Moss 1975	Feemoss 1960	Feevagh
Dam Ballinlovane	Billy's Beauty	Arapaho 1973	Huntercombe 1967
Dam Ballinlovane	Billy's Beauty	Arapaho 1973	Persuader
Dam Ballinlovane	Billy's Beauty	Castlering	Escart
Dam Ballinlovane	Billy's Beauty	Castlering	Royal Trix
