= Midway Lady =

American-bred Thoroughbred racehorse

- Racing silks of Harry Ranier
- Sire: Alleged
- Grandsire: Hoist The Flag
- Dam: Smooth Bore
- Damsire: His Majesty
- Sex: Mare
- Foaled: 14 February 1983
- Country: United States
- Colour: Bay
- Breeder: Shadowlawn Farm
- Owner: Harry Ranier
- Trainer: Ben Hanbury
- Record: 6: 5-1-0

Major wins
- May Hill Stakes (1985); Prix Marcel Boussac (1985); 1000 Guineas (1986); Epsom Oaks (1986)

Awards
- Timeform rating: 126 in 1986

Midway Lady (foaled 1983) was an American-bred, British-trained Thoroughbred racehorse and broodmare who won two British Classic Races in 1986. In a racing career lasting from August 1985 until June 1986, the filly ran six times and won her last five races. She sustained her only defeat when finishing second on her racecourse debut but won her remaining three races in 1985 including the May Hill Stakes at Doncaster and the Prix Marcel Boussac at Longchamp. Her three-year-old campaign consisted of only two races, as she won the 1000 Guineas at Newmarket and the Oaks at Epsom a month later. After sustaining a serious leg injury, she was retired to stud where she became a successful producer of winners including the Oaks winner Eswarah.

== Background ==
Midway Lady was a big, powerful bay filly bred in Kentucky by Edward A. Seltzer and Shadowlawn Farm. She was sired by the dual Prix de l'Arc de Triomphe winner Alleged out of the mare Smooth Bore. Alleged a successful stallion, and a strong influence for stamina: his best winners included Miss Alleged, Shantou, Legal Case (Champion Stakes) and Law Society (Irish Derby). In September 1983, Midway Lady was sent as a yearling to the sales at Keeneland where she was sold for $42,000 to a group called Robin Enrterprises. The price was less than half Alleged's stud fee at the time and was explained by the fact that the filly's legs, according to one authority, "deviated from the ideal to a marked degree". Despite her sale she raced in the colours of Harry Ranier, one of the owners of Shadowlawn: Timeform described the exact details of the filly's sale and ownership as "rather obscure". Midway Lady was sent to race in Europe as a two-year-old where she was trained by Ben Hanbury at Newmarket, Suffolk.

== Racing career ==
=== 1985: two-year-old season ===
After finishing second to Untold on her racecourse debut at Yarmouth Racecourse in August 1985, Midway Lady recorded her first win when taking a seven furlong maiden race later that month at the same course. She was then moved up to Group Three class for the May Hill Stakes at Doncaster a month later. She was restrained in the early stages by her veteran jockey Lester Piggott before taking the lead in the straight and winning by three lengths from Tender Loving Care. The form of her only defeat was boosted on 26 September when Untold won the Fillies' Mile.

Piggott rode the filly again in the Prix Marcel Boussac at Longchamp on October. She started a clear favourite for the Group One race at odds of 7/10 against fourteen rivals. Midway Lady was second on the final turn before taking the lead in the straight. She stayed on strongly to win from the outsiders Fieldy and Riverbride, and although the final winning margin was only a neck, she never appeared likely to be caught.

=== 1986: three-year-old season ===
With her stamina-rich pedigree Midway Lady was regarded as a leading fancy for the one and a half mile Epsom Oaks, but she began her season in the 1000 Guineas over Newmarket's Rowley Mile course in May. With Piggott having retired (for the first time) at the end of 1985, the filly was ridden by Ray Cochrane and started at odds of 10/1 in a field of fifteen fillies. She won by three quarters of a length from Maysoon, with the 6/4 favourite Sonic Lady a short head away in third. After the race, Hanbury admitted that he had always considered Midway Lady to be primarily an Oaks filly, but that Piggott had insisted that she had the speed to win a Guineas.

On 7 June, Midway Lady started 15/8 favourite for the Epsom Oaks. Ridden again by Cochrane, she won by a length from Untold with Maysoon third. Her winning time of 2:35.60 was more than one and a half seconds faster than that recorded by Shahrastani, when beating Dancing Brave in the Derby over the same course and distance three days earlier. After the Oaks, Midway Lady sustained a leg injury described as inflamed tendon sheath, which did not respond to treatment. In August Hanbury announced that the filly would not race again.

== Retirement ==
In November 1986, Midway Lady was offered for sale at Keeneland, and was bought for $3.3m by representatives of Hamdan Al Maktoum's Shadwell Stud. She made an immediate impact as a broodmare when her first foal, a filly named Umniyatee won two races and finished third in the Irish 1000 Guineas. Midway Lady produced several other winners, most notably Eswarah (sired by Unfuwain), who emulated her mother by winning the Epsom Oaks in 2005. A more unusual success was the gelding Fatehalkhair, who was virtually useless on the flat, but won twenty races under National Hunt rules.

Stud Record

2005 Ghaidaa (IRE) : Bay filly, foaled 8 February, by Cape Cross (IRE) - won 1 race and placed 4 times from 7 starts in England 2008, including 3rd LR Atalanta Stakes, Sandown; 3rd LR Rosemary Stakes, Ascot

2006 Sana Abel (IRE) : Bay filly, foaled 22 May, by Alhaarth (IRE) - won 1 race and placed 2nd once from 7 starts in England 2009

== Assessment and honours ==
The independent Timeform organisation gave Midway Lady a rating of 120 in 1985 and 126 in 1986.

In their book, A Century of Champions, based on the Timeform rating system, John Randall and Tony Morris rated Midway Lady an "average" winner of the 1000 Guineas and Oaks.

== Pedigree ==
Pedigree of Midway Lady (USA), bay mare, 1983
Sire Alleged (USA) 1974	Hoist The Flag; 1968	Tom Rolfe	Ribot
Sire Alleged (USA) 1974	Hoist The Flag; 1968	Tom Rolfe	Pocahontas
Sire Alleged (USA) 1974	Hoist The Flag; 1968	Wavy Navy	War Admiral
Sire Alleged (USA) 1974	Hoist The Flag; 1968	Wavy Navy	Triomphe
Sire Alleged (USA) 1974	Princess Pout; 1966	Prince John	Princequillo
Sire Alleged (USA) 1974	Princess Pout; 1966	Prince John	Not Afraid
Sire Alleged (USA) 1974	Princess Pout; 1966	Determined Lady	Determine
Sire Alleged (USA) 1974	Princess Pout; 1966	Determined Lady	Tumbling
Dam Smooth Bore (USA) 1976	His Majesty; 1968	Ribot	Tenerani
Dam Smooth Bore (USA) 1976	His Majesty; 1968	Ribot	Romanella
Dam Smooth Bore (USA) 1976	His Majesty; 1968	Flower Bowl	Alibhai
Dam Smooth Bore (USA) 1976	His Majesty; 1968	Flower Bowl	Flower Bed
Dam Smooth Bore (USA) 1976	French Leave; 1970	Damascus	Sword Dancer
Dam Smooth Bore (USA) 1976	French Leave; 1970	Damascus	Kerala
Dam Smooth Bore (USA) 1976	French Leave; 1970	Marche Lorraine	Blue Moon
Dam Smooth Bore (USA) 1976	French Leave; 1970	Marche Lorraine	Croix de Lorraine (Family:8-k)

- Midway Lady was inbred 3x4 to Ribot, meaning that this stallion appears in the fourth generation of her pedigree.
- Midway Lady's ancestors were predominantly North American. The unraced Alibhai was the only British-bred horse in the first four generations of her pedigree.
