= Tom Rolfe =

American Thoroughbred racehorse

- Tom Rolfe's grave at Claiborne Farm
- Sire: Ribot
- Grandsire: Tenerani
- Dam: Pocahontas
- Damsire: Roman
- Sex: Stallion
- Foaled: 1962
- Country: United States
- Color: Bay
- Breeder: Raymond R. Guest
- Owner: Powhatan Stable
- Trainer: Frank Y. Whiteley Jr.
- Record: 31: 16-5-5
- Earnings: $671,297

Major wins
- Cowdin Stakes (1964); American Derby (1965); Arlington Classic (1965); Aqueduct Handicap (1966); Salvator Mile Handicap (1966) American Triple Crown wins: Preakness Stakes (1965)

Awards
- U.S. Champion 3-Yr-Old Colt (1965)

Tom Rolfe (April 14, 1962 – June 12, 1989) was an American Thoroughbred racehorse and sire. He was the leading colt of his generation in the United States, winning the Preakness Stakes and being voted American Champion Three-Year-Old Male Horse in 1965.

== Background ==
Tom Rolfe was one of the best American sons of the undefeated Italian champion Ribot. His dam was Pocahontas, from whom he takes his name (the historical Pocahontas's only child was named Thomas). His half-siblings include the talented racehorse and sire Chieftain (a son of Bold Ruler).

A small horse, Tom Rolfe stood 15.2 hands and weighed less than 1,000 pounds.

== Racing career ==
Tom Rolfe won 16 of his 31 starts, with total earnings of $671,297. Ridden by future Hall of Fame jockey Ron Turcotte, he ran third to winner Lucky Debonair in the 1965 Kentucky Derby. In May he won the Preakness Stakes at Pimlico Race Course, beating Dapper Dan by a neck, despite losing a shoe in the race and sustaining a minor injury. In the Belmont Stakes in June he led in the straight but was caught close to the finish and beaten a neck by Hail To All. He went on to record a notable hat-trick at Arlington Park, winning the Citation Handicap in July, the Arlington Classic in August, and the American Derby in September (breaking the track record). His performances were enough to earn him American Champion 3-Year-Old Male Horse honors.

His sire, Ribot, won back-to-back runnings of the Prix de l'Arc de Triomphe, and Tom Rolfe was shipped to Longchamp Racecourse in Paris, France to contest the 1965 Arc. He disputed the lead until the closing stages and finished sixth on the grass course to Sea-Bird, but that result remains one of the best by an American-trained entry in that championship race.

Tom Rolfe stayed in training as a four-year-old in 1966. His wins included carrying 127 pounds to victory in the Aqueduct Handicap in September.

== Stud record ==
Retired to stud at Claiborne Farm near Paris, Kentucky, Tom Rolfe proved a successful sire. He is largely known today as a sire of outstanding broodmares, but his best offspring on the track was 1970 American Champion Two-Year-Old Colt and 1987 leading broodmare sire Hoist The Flag. Tom Rolfe died in 1989 and was buried at Claiborne Farm's Marchmont cemetery.

== Sire line tree ==
- Tom Rolfe
  - Hoist The Flag
    - Alleged
      - Montelimar
        - Monty's Pass
        - Hedgehunter
      - Law Society
        - Approach the Bench
        - Fortune's Wheel
        - Homme de Loi
        - Right Win
        - Court of Honour
        - Anzillero
        - Catch Me
      - Leading Counsel
        - Rodock
        - Dun Doire
        - Justified
        - Knockara Beau
      - Hours After
      - Legal Case
        - Evil Knievel
      - Strategic Choice
        - Bog Warrior
        - Grey Gold
      - Flemensfirth
        - Joe Lively
        - Imperial Commander
        - Tidal Bay
        - Pandorama
        - Flemenstar
        - Lostintranslation
        - Tornado Flyer
      - Flat Top
      - Shantou
        - Ballynagour
        - Morning Assembly
        - Briar Hill
        - Beware The Bear
        - Death Duty
        - The Storyteller
        - Something Soon
        - Run Wild Fred
        - Jim Key
    - Delta Flag
    - Salutely
      - Make Me A Champ
    - Hoist The King
    - Linkage
    - Stalwart
      - Kingpost
      - Stalwars
      - Stalwart Charger
      - Sacred Honour
  - Run the Gantlet
    - Panamint
    - Ardross
      - Miocamen
      - Karinga Bay
        - Grave Doubts
        - Copsale Lad
        - Karanja
        - Shining Strand
        - Coneygree
      - Alderbrook
        - Baron Windrush
        - Ollie Magern
        - Sh Boom
      - Anzum
      - Young Kenny
      - Ackzo
    - Providential
      - Prorutori
    - Commanche Run
      - Bonny Scot
      - Wavy Run
      - Commanche Court
      - Timbera
  - Salt Marsh
  - Bowl Game
  - French Colonial
  - Tantalizing
  - Rough Pearl
  - Allez Milord

== Pedigree ==
Pedigree of Tom Rolfe
Sire Ribot bay 1952	Tenerani brown 1944	Bellini	Cavaliere d'Arpino
Sire Ribot bay 1952	Tenerani brown 1944	Bellini	Bella Minna
Sire Ribot bay 1952	Tenerani brown 1944	Tofanella	Apelle
Sire Ribot bay 1952	Tenerani brown 1944	Tofanella	Try Try Again
Sire Ribot bay 1952	Romanella ch. 1943	El Greco	Pharos
Sire Ribot bay 1952	Romanella ch. 1943	El Greco	Gay Gamp
Sire Ribot bay 1952	Romanella ch. 1943	Barbara Burrini	Papyrus*
Sire Ribot bay 1952	Romanella ch. 1943	Barbara Burrini	Bucolic*
Dam Pocahontas brown 1955	Roman bay 1937	Sir Gallahad	Teddy
Dam Pocahontas brown 1955	Roman bay 1937	Sir Gallahad	Plucky Liege
Dam Pocahontas brown 1955	Roman bay 1937	Buckup	Buchan*
Dam Pocahontas brown 1955	Roman bay 1937	Buckup	Look Up
Dam Pocahontas brown 1955	How bay 1948	Princequillo	Prince Rose
Dam Pocahontas brown 1955	How bay 1948	Princequillo	Cosquilla*
Dam Pocahontas brown 1955	How bay 1948	The Squaw	Sickle
Dam Pocahontas brown 1955	How bay 1948	The Squaw	Minnewaska

* Tom Rolfe is inbred 4S x 5D to the stallion Papyrus, meaning that he appears fourth generation on the sire side of his pedigree and fifth generation (via Conquilla) on the dam side of his pedigree.

* Tom Rolfe is inbred 5S x 4D to the stallion Buchan, meaning that he appears fifth generation (via Bucolic) on the sire side of his pedigree and fourth generation on the dam side of his pedigree.
