= Quest for Fame (horse) =

British-bred Thoroughbred racehorse (1987–2011)

Quest For Fame
- Racing colours of Khalid Abdullah
- Sire: Rainbow Quest
- Grandsire: Blushing Groom
- Dam: Aryenne
- Damsire: Green Dancer
- Sex: Stallion
- Foaled: 15 February 1987
- Country: Great Britain
- Colour: Bay
- Breeder: Juddmonte Farms
- Owner: Khalid Abdullah
- Trainer: Jeremy Tree; Roger Charlton; Robert J. Frankel (USA)
- Record: 15: 4-4-2
- Earnings: £937,398

Major wins
- Epsom Derby (1990); San Luis Obispo Handicap (1992); Hollywood Invitational Turf Handicap (1992); Timeform rating: 127
- Last updated on 21 October 2023

Quest For Fame (1987–2011) was a British-bred and British-trained Thoroughbred race horse and sire. In a racing career which lasted from October 1989 until November 1992, he ran fifteen times and won four races. His most notable success came in 1990 when he won the Derby. He was later trained in the United States, where he won the San Luis Obispo Handicap and the Hollywood Invitational Turf Handicap in 1992. He was the first Epsom Derby winner to win a major race as a five-year-old since St. Gatien in 1886.

== Background ==
Quest For Fame was a very dark-coated bay horse who was bred by Juddmonte Farms, the breeding organisation of his owner Khalid Abdullah. His sire, Rainbow Quest, was a highly successful racehorse who won the Prix de l'Arc de Triomphe in 1985. He went on to become an important stallion, siring the Group One winners Nedawi, Millenary and Croco Rouge. Quest For Fame's dam, Aryenne, won the Poule d'Essai des Pouliches in 1980. Quest for Fame was sent into training with Jeremy Tree at Beckhampton in Wiltshire.

== Racing career ==
=== 1989: two-year-old season ===
Quest For Fame made his debut in a maiden race at Newbury on 28 October 1989. He started 2/1 favourite and finished second to Tyburn Tree.

=== 1990: three-year-old season ===
After the retirement of Jeremy Tree, the training of Quest For Fame was taken over by his assistant Roger Charlton. In April 1990, Quest For Fame returned to Newbury and recorded his first win when taking the Spring Maiden Stakes by one and a half lengths. At Chester in May he finished second of the three runners in the Chester Vase, beaten a length by Belmez.

At Epsom on 6 June, Quest For Fame started 7/1 fourth favourite for the Derby. Ridden by the eleven-times champion Pat Eddery, he took the lead over a furlong from the finish and pulled clear to win by three lengths from Blue Stag. The beaten horses included Elmaamul, Linamix, Zoman, and Mr Brooks.

In July Quest For Fame started 5/4 favourite for the Irish Derby at the Curragh. He finished fifth behind the filly Salsabil.

=== 1991: four-year-old season ===
Quest For Fame ran five times as a four-year-old without winning. In the Coronation Cup at Epsom in June, he finished fourth of the seven runners behind In The Groove. In August, he ran second to Terimon in the International Stakes. He started odds-on favourite for the Group Three September Stakes at Kempton but was beaten a neck by the three-year-old Young Buster. On his final European start, Quest For Fame finished seventh of the fourteen runners behind Suave Dancer in the Prix de l'Arc de Triomphe.

Quest For Fame's lack of success led to his being sent off a 58/1 outsider for the Breeders' Cup Turf at Churchill Downs in November. He belied his odds and produced his best performance of the season in running third to Miss Alleged.

=== 1992: five-year-old season ===
In 1992, Quest For Fame was transferred to the stable of Robert J. Frankel in California. In February, he recorded his first win since the 1990 Derby when defeating Miss Alleged in the Grade III San Luis Obispo Handicap at Santa Anita Park In May at Hollywood Park Racetrack, he carried top weight of 124 pounds to victory in the Grade I Hollywood Invitational Turf Handicap.

Quest For Fame was off the racecourse for four months before returning in the autumn of 1992. He finished unplaced in the Arlington Million behind Dear Doctor before running in the Breeders' Cup Turf at Gulfstream Park in October. The field also included the three-year-old Dr Devious, meaning that the race featured the first meeting between Epsom Derby winners since Nijinsky defeated Blakeney in the 1970 King George VI and Queen Elizabeth Stakes. Quest for Fame got the better of Dr Devious by a length, as they finished third and fourth behind Fraise. On his final start, Quest for Fame was unplaced behind Tokai Teio in the Japan Cup.

== Assessment ==
In their book A Century of Champions, John Randall and Tony Morris rated Quest For Fame a "poor" Derby winner.

== Stud record ==
Quest for Fame stood as a stallion in the United States and Australia until he was pensioned from breeding duty in 2010.

He sired 7 individual Group One winners.

=== Notable progeny ===
c = colt, f = filly, g = gelding

Foaled	Name	Sex	Major Wins
1994	Famous Digger	f	Del Mar Oaks
1995	Dracula	c	Champagne Stakes, Sires' Produce Stakes (BRC), George Main Stakes
1996	Tributes	f	Crown Oaks
1997	Unworldly	f	Flight Stakes
1998	Viscount	c	Sires' Produce Stakes (ATC), Champagne Stakes, George Main Stakes
2000	Sarrera	g	Queen Elizabeth Stakes, Doomben Cup
2002	De Beers	c	Rosehill Guineas

== Pedigree ==
Pedigree of Quest for Fame (GB), bay stallion, 1987
Sire Rainbow Quest (USA) 1981	Blushing Groom; 1974	Red God	Nasrullah
Sire Rainbow Quest (USA) 1981	Blushing Groom; 1974	Red God	Spring Run
Sire Rainbow Quest (USA) 1981	Blushing Groom; 1974	Runaway Bride	Wild Risk
Sire Rainbow Quest (USA) 1981	Blushing Groom; 1974	Runaway Bride	Aimee
Sire Rainbow Quest (USA) 1981	I Will Follow; 1975	Herbager	Vandale
Sire Rainbow Quest (USA) 1981	I Will Follow; 1975	Herbager	Flagette
Sire Rainbow Quest (USA) 1981	I Will Follow; 1975	Where You Lead	Raise a Native
Sire Rainbow Quest (USA) 1981	I Will Follow; 1975	Where You Lead	Noblesse
Dam Aryenne (IRE) 1977	Green Dancer; 1972	Nijinsky	Northern Dancer
Dam Aryenne (IRE) 1977	Green Dancer; 1972	Nijinsky	Flaming Page
Dam Aryenne (IRE) 1977	Green Dancer; 1972	Green Valley	Val de Loir
Dam Aryenne (IRE) 1977	Green Dancer; 1972	Green Valley	Sly Pola
Dam Aryenne (IRE) 1977	Americaine; 1968	Cambremont	Sicmabre
Dam Aryenne (IRE) 1977	Americaine; 1968	Cambremont	Djebellica
Dam Aryenne (IRE) 1977	Americaine; 1968	Alora	Ballyogan
Dam Aryenne (IRE) 1977	Americaine; 1968	Alora	Agnes (Family:4)
