= Flemensfirth =

American-bred Thoroughbred racehorse

- Racing colours of Sheikh Mohammed
- Sire: Alleged
- Grandsire: Hoist The Flag
- Dam: Etheldreda
- Damsire: Diesis
- Sex: Stallion
- Foaled: 16 March 1992
- Died: 26 May 2023 (aged 31)
- Country: United States
- Colour: Bay
- Breeder: Mill Ridge Farm
- Owner: Sheikh Mohammed
- Trainer: John Gosden
- Record: 9: 5-1-0

Major wins
- Prix Lupin (1995); Prix Dollar (1995,1996); Premio Roma (1996)

Flemensfirth (16 March 1992 – 26 May 2023) was a Thoroughbred racehorse and stallion, who was bred in the United States but trained in the United Kingdom during a racing career which ran from 1994 to 1997. He is best known as a successful sire of National Hunt racehorses.

== Background ==
Flemensfirth was a bay horse bred by the Mill Ridge Farm at Lexington, Kentucky. He was sired by the dual Prix de l'Arc de Triomphe winner Alleged out of the Diesis mare Etheldreda. He was bought as a yearling for $290,000 by Sheikh Mohammed and sent into training with John Gosden in England.

== Racing career ==
Flemensfirth did not appear on the racecourse until the September of his two-year-old season, when he won a Nottingham maiden race "smoothly" by three lengths.

After finishing second in the listed Feilden Stakes at Newmarket on his three-year-old debut, he was campaigned exclusively in top-class company. At Longchamp in May he upset the 1–2 favourite Solar One to take the Group I Prix Lupin, taking the lead two furlongs out and staying on strongly to win by a length. After finishing unplaced in the Prix du Jockey Club and the St. James's Palace Stakes he was rested for an autumn campaign. He returned to Longchamp for the Arc meeting, where he led all the way to win the Group 2 Prix Dollar by half a length from Volochine.

Injury then kept Flemensfirth off the racecourse for over a year. When he returned he took his record at Longchamp to three wins in three starts by taking his second Prix Dollar, leading in the straight and staying on strongly to win by two lengths. A month later he travelled to Italy to land odds of 1–2 in the Premio Roma, defeating the German mare Hollywood Dream by a neck.

By the time he appeared again in the 1997 Dubai World Cup, Flemensfirth had not lost a race for almost two years, but he was always struggling on the dirt surface, and came home last of the ten finishers behind Singspiel. It proved to be his final racecourse appearance.

== Stud career ==
Flemensfirth has had very little success as a sire of flat-race horses, but has been highly successful as a sire of jumpers. By 2005 he was being mentioned as a "leading sire of the future" and he has gone on to produce the winners of almost five hundred races. His best son is the Cheltenham Gold Cup winner Imperial Commander, while his other Grade I winners include Tidal Bay, Flemenstar, Joe Lively, Relegate, Colreevy and Pandorama. He stood for the Coolmore organisation at The Beeches stud in County Waterford from 1998 until his retirement from stallion duty in 2020 and died on 26 May 2023.

== Pedigree ==
Pedigree of Flemensfirth, bay horse, 16 March 1992
| Sire Alleged (USA) 1974 | Hoist The Flag (USA) 1968 | Tom Rolfe | Ribot |
| Sire Alleged (USA) 1974 | Hoist The Flag (USA) 1968 | Tom Rolfe | Pocahontas |
| Sire Alleged (USA) 1974 | Hoist The Flag (USA) 1968 | Wavy Navy | War Admiral* |
| Sire Alleged (USA) 1974 | Hoist The Flag (USA) 1968 | Wavy Navy | Triomphe |
| Sire Alleged (USA) 1974 | Princess Pout (USA) 1966 | Prince John | Princequillo |
| Sire Alleged (USA) 1974 | Princess Pout (USA) 1966 | Prince John | Not Afraid |
| Sire Alleged (USA) 1974 | Princess Pout (USA) 1966 | Determined Lady | Determine |
| Sire Alleged (USA) 1974 | Princess Pout (USA) 1966 | Determined Lady | Tumbling* |
| Dam Etheldreda (USA) 1985 | Diesis 1980 | Sharpen Up | Atan |
| Dam Etheldreda (USA) 1985 | Diesis 1980 | Sharpen Up | Rocchetta |
| Dam Etheldreda (USA) 1985 | Diesis 1980 | Doubly Sure | Reliance |
| Dam Etheldreda (USA) 1985 | Diesis 1980 | Doubly Sure | Soft Angels |
| Dam Etheldreda (USA) 1985 | Royal Bund (USA) 1961 | Royal Coinage | Eight Thirty |
| Dam Etheldreda (USA) 1985 | Royal Bund (USA) 1961 | Royal Coinage | Canina |
| Dam Etheldreda (USA) 1985 | Royal Bund (USA) 1961 | Nato | Court Martial |
| Dam Etheldreda (USA) 1985 | Royal Bund (USA) 1961 | Nato | Safari Moon (Family 1-w) |

* Flemensfirth is inbred 4S x 5S to the stallion War Admiral, meaning that he appears fourth generation and fifth generation (via Tumbling) on the sire side of his pedigree.
