= Diesis (horse) =

British-bred Thoroughbred racehorse

- Sire: Sharpen Up
- Grandsire: Atan
- Dam: Doubly Sure
- Damsire: Reliance
- Sex: Stallion
- Foaled: 23 April 1980
- Country: Great Britain
- Colour: Bay
- Breeder: Lord Howard de Walden
- Owner: Lord Howard de Walden
- Trainer: Henry Cecil
- Record: 5: 3 – 1 – 0

Major wins
- Middle Park Stakes (1982); Dewhurst Stakes (1982)

Awards
- Top-rated European two-year-old (1982); Timeform top-rated two-year-old (1982); Timeform rating: 133
- Last updated on 29 July 2022

Diesis (23 April 1980 – 18 November 2006) was a British Thoroughbred racehorse and sire. An outstanding two-year-old in 1982, he did not reach the same heights at three but went on to become an extremely successful breeding stallion in the United States.

== Background ==
Diesis was a chestnut horse with a white star and three white socks bred in England by his owner, Lord Howard de Walden. He was sired by Sharpen Up out of the noted broodmare Doubly Sure, making him a full brother to the champion miler Kris and Keen, and a half-brother to several other good winners including Presidium and Rudimentary (Sandown Mile). The colt was named after the printer's symbol "‡" also known as a "double dagger". He was trained by Henry Cecil at his Warren Place stable in Newmarket, Suffolk.

== Racing career ==
As a juvenile, Diesis won three races from four starts. After running fifth in a maiden race on his debut he won the Rhys-Jenkins and Standing Stakes by seven lengths. He was then moved up in class and won the Group One Middle Park Stakes over six furlongs at Newmarket Racecourse in October. Later that month he returned to Newmarket for the Dewhurst Stakes over seven furlongs, in which he was matched against Gorytus an unbeaten colt from the Dick Hern stable with an exceptional reputation. Gorytus ran very poorly (he was widely believed to have been drugged) and Diesis won his second Group One race very easily. He was the highest rated European two-year-old in the 1982 International Classification, a collaboration between the official handicappers of Britain, France and Ireland. Diesis was also rated the best two-year-old of the season by the independent Timeform organisation.

The spring of 1983 was unusually cold and wet, and Henry Cecil, along with many other trainers, had difficulty bringing his horses to peak fitness. His problems were compounded when Diesis suffered from lameness in early April and then injured a leg shortly before his seasonal debut in the 2000 Guineas. On 30 April Diesis started 100/30 favourite for the Guineas, but finished eighth of the sixteen runners behind Lomond. On his only other race, Diesis was beaten by The Noble Player in a seven furlong race at Kempton Park in May.

== Stud record ==
Although standing as a stallion in Kentucky, Diesis' most successful progeny ran in Europe, including Epsom Oaks and Irish Oaks winners Diminuendo, Love Divine and Ramruma, Eclipse Stakes winner Elmaamul, multiple Group 1 winning, ten-furlong specialist Halling and Flemensfirth. Diesis' great-grandson Serpentine won the Epsom Derby in 2020.

He also sired North American Grade 1 winners Continuously, Husband, Rootentootenwooten, ex-English trained Storm Trooper and 2010 Arlington Million winner Debussy.

Diesis was euthanised on 18 November 2006 at Mill Ridge Farm, Lexington, Kentucky after fracturing a hip.

== Pedigree ==
Pedigree of Diesis (GB), chestnut stallion, 1980
Sire Sharpen Up (GB) 1969	Atan; 1961	Native Dancer	Polynesian
Sire Sharpen Up (GB) 1969	Atan; 1961	Native Dancer	Geisha
Sire Sharpen Up (GB) 1969	Atan; 1961	Mixed Marriage	Tudor Minstrel
Sire Sharpen Up (GB) 1969	Atan; 1961	Mixed Marriage	Persian Maid
Sire Sharpen Up (GB) 1969	Rocchetta; 1961	Rockefella	Hyperion
Sire Sharpen Up (GB) 1969	Rocchetta; 1961	Rockefella	Rockfel
Sire Sharpen Up (GB) 1969	Rocchetta; 1961	Chambiges	Majano
Sire Sharpen Up (GB) 1969	Rocchetta; 1961	Chambiges	Chanterelle
Dam Doubly Sure (FR) 1971	Reliance; 1962	Tantieme	Deux-Pour-Cent
Dam Doubly Sure (FR) 1971	Reliance; 1962	Tantieme	Terka
Dam Doubly Sure (FR) 1971	Reliance; 1962	Relance	Relic
Dam Doubly Sure (FR) 1971	Reliance; 1962	Relance	Polaire
Dam Doubly Sure (FR) 1971	Soft Angels; 1963	Crepello	Donatello
Dam Doubly Sure (FR) 1971	Soft Angels; 1963	Crepello	Crepuscule
Dam Doubly Sure (FR) 1971	Soft Angels; 1963	Sweet Angel	Honeyway
Dam Doubly Sure (FR) 1971	Soft Angels; 1963	Sweet Angel	No Angel (Family:2-o)
