= Halling (horse) =

American-bred Thoroughbred racehorse (1991–2016)

- Sire: Diesis
- Grandsire: Sharpen Up
- Dam: Dance Machine
- Damsire: Green Dancer
- Sex: Stallion
- Foaled: 1991
- Country: United States
- Colour: Chestnut
- Breeder: Cyril Humphris
- Owner: Cyril Humphris; Godolphin Racing (12/1994)
- Trainer: John Gosden; Saeed bin Suroor (12/1994)
- Record: 18: 12-1-0
- Earnings: $1,332,651

Major wins
- Cambridgeshire Handicap (1994); Al Maktoum Challenge, Round 1 (1995); Eclipse Stakes (1995, 1996); International Stakes (1995, 1996); Prix d'Ispahan (1996)

Awards
- European Champion Older Horse (1996); Timeform rating: 133
- Last updated on 4 November 2023

Halling (14 March 1991 – 2 February 2016) was an American-bred, British-trained racehorse. He was notable for completing the double of the Eclipse Stakes and the International Stakes in 1995 and 1996.

== Background ==
Halling was sired by Diesis out of the mare Dance Machine. He was bred by the art collector, Cyril Humphris. The colt was trained in the early part of his career by John Gosden and subsequently by Hilal Ibrahim in Dubai and then by Saeed bin Suroor.

== Racing career ==
=== 1994: three-year-old season ===
As a three-year-old, Halling got his first win in the August 1994 Harrogate Handicap at Ripon Racecourse. He followed this with two further victories, including the Cambridgeshire Handicap at Newmarket in October, ridden by Frankie Dettori.

=== 1995: four-year-old season ===
Halling was transferred to Sheikh Mohammed's Godolphin operation in late 1994 and subsequently gained multiple Group 1 successes, starting with the 1995 Eclipse Stakes at Sandown Park followed by the International Stakes at York, ridden on both occasions by Walter Swinburn. In the 1995 Breeders' Cup Classic, held that year at Belmont Park in Elmont, New York, Halling finished eleventh and last.

=== 1996: five-year-old season ===
In the spring of 1996 Halling was unplaced behind Cigar in the Dubai World Cup. He later won the Group One Prix d'Ispahan at Longchamps in France. He completed the feat of winning both the Eclipse and International Stakes for the second straight year. He finished his racing career at Newmarket, running second to 1,000 Guineas winner Bosra Sham in the 1996 Champion Stakes.

Halling also won four races on the dirt track at Nad Al Sheba in Dubai. In all, he ran 18 times, winning 12 races.

== Stud career ==
Retired to stud at Dalham Hall Stud in Newmarket in 1997–2003 and in 2004–05 at the Emirates Stud Farm in Dubai, Returned at Dalham Hall Stud in Newmarket in 2006–14 Pensioned from stud duties in 2014 Died at Dalham Hall Stud on 2 February 2016 owing to "the infirmities of old age". His offspring included Jack Hobbs, Norse Dancer, Cavalryman and Opinion Poll (Goodwood Cup).
