= Tidal Bay =

Thoroughbred racehorse

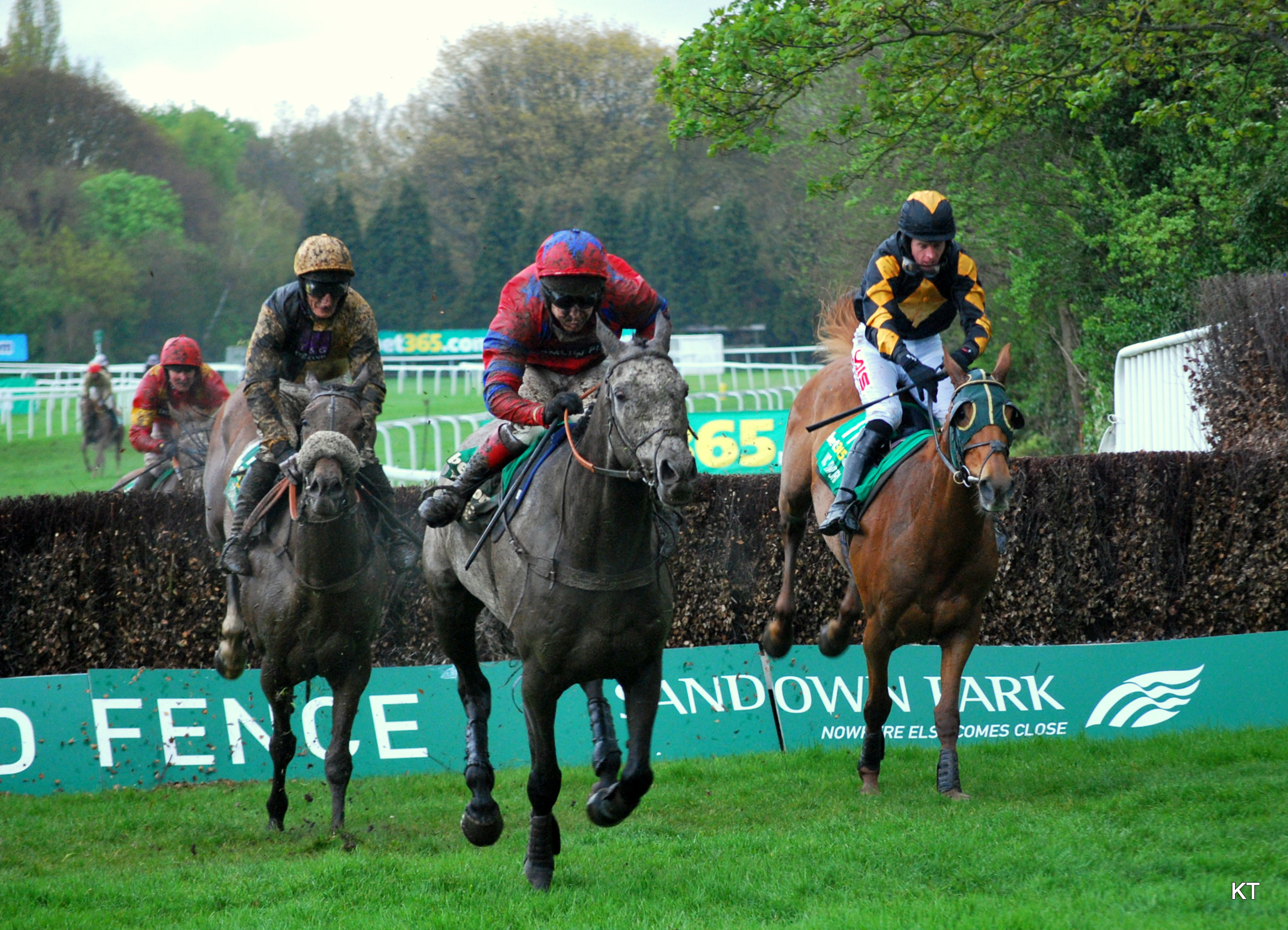
- Tidal Bay (left with noseband) racing in the Bet365 Gold Cup at Sandown Park in April 2012
- Sire: Flemensfirth
- Dam: June's Bride
- Damsire: Le Moss
- Sex: Gelding
- Foaled: 12 May 2001
- Country: Ireland
- Colour: Bay
- Owner: Graham & Andrea Wylie
- Trainer: Howard Johnson; Paul Nicholls
- Record: 36: 13-11-3
- Earnings: £641,088

Major wins
- Mersey Novices' Hurdle (2007); Arkle Challenge Trophy (2008); Maghull Novices' Chase (2008); Cleeve Hurdle (2010); Bet365 Gold Cup (2012); West Yorkshire Hurdle (2012); Lexus Chase (2012)
- Last updated on 4 November 2012

Tidal Bay is an Irish bred Bay gelding Thoroughbred race horse foaled on 12 May 2001. He was the winner of three Grade 1 jumps races, the Arkle Challenge Trophy and the Maghull Novices' Chase in 2008 as well as the Lexus Chase in 2012. Trained by initially by Howard Johnson and subsequently by Paul Nicholls and owned by Graham and Andrea Wylie, he was bred by John Dorgan.

== Racing career ==
=== Debut ===
He made his debut in a National Hunt flat race (under Michal Kohl) at Wetherby on 18 March 2006, where he finished a half length second to Scribano Eile. He was then second again by only a neck just under a month later at Aintree. In doing so he beat the decent Kicks For Free, Hennessy and Wichita Lineman.

=== 2006/07 season ===
In his first season racing Tidal Bay was sent novice hurdling winning in his first three attempts by a total of 21 lengths. He was second by only a neck to Massini's Maguire in the Ballymore Properties Novices' Hurdle at the Cheltenham Festival in March 2007. On that day he had future Cheltenham Gold Cup winner Imperial Commander well behind him. Tidal Bay then went on to improve on that in Mersey Novices' Hurdle at Aintree in April 2007, where he beat Wins Now by 8 lengths under Paddy Brennan.

=== 2007/08 season ===
In the 2007–2008 season, Tidal Bay was to embark on a hugely successful Novice Chasing campaign. He was sent off at odds on for his first three Novice Chases, the first at Aintree where he beat the brilliant Albertas Run by a staggering 22 lengths. He comfortably won his next two starts and was made ante-post favourite for the Arkle Challenge Trophy at Cheltenham. His prep run for that race came in a Novices Chase at Doncaster in February, where he was sent off a 1/4 shot, but after making a mistake at the second last he was beaten a neck by Leslingtaylor. He was sent off the 6/1 second favourite for the 2008 Arkle Challenge Trophy behind market leader Noland (7/4) and it was in this race that Tidal Bay gained the biggest success of his career to date, where he was a comfortable 13 length winner over Kruguyrova. He went on to add to this success at Aintree in April 2008, where he won the Grade 1 Maghull Novices' Chase by 6 lengths from Takeroc.

=== 2008/09 season ===
His first race out of novice company came at Carlisle on 2 November 2008. He won comfortably, again beating Albertas Run. Next he headed to Sandown Park for the Grade 1 Tingle Creek Chase. Here he put up a valiant effort beaten only by the juggernaut that is Master Minded. He was then 2nd again on boxing day in the Rowland Meyrick Handicap Chase at Wetherby this time beaten 7 lengths by Nozic. In January 2009 Tidal Bay was 3rd behind Joe Lively and Welsh National winner Halcon Genelardais in the Letherby & Christopher chase on heavy going at Cheltenham. He headed straight back to Cheltenham for the Festival finishing fourth behind Imperial Commander in the Ryanair Chase. Tidal Bay then went to Aintree for the Melling Chase but could only manage a 5th at the end of a hard season. Subsequently, he was treated for a back problem and would return early in the 2009–2010 season.

=== 2009/10 season ===
Tidal Bay returned in October 2009 at Aintree in the Old Roan Chase. He put up a decent performance for 2nd behind Monet's Garden and in doing so beat that seasons eventual Grand National winner Don't Push It. He disappointed at Huntingdon in December when finishing 4th when sent off the 15/8 favourite for the Peterborough Chase. Questions were now being asked as to whether his back was still an issue. Tidal Bay then pulled off a shock when winning the Grade 2 Cleeve Hurdle at the Cheltenham Festival Trials meeting beating ace hurdlers Lough Derg and Katchit as well as the potentially top class chaser Time For Rupert. It was decided that he would remain over hurdles and be aimed at the World Hurdle at the Festival in March. Unfortunately Tidal Bay was unable to repeat that form finishing 7th behind Big Buck's and Time For Rupert. He faced Big Buck's again at Aintree but could only manage 4th.

=== 2010/11 season ===
Tidal Bay's first run of the 2010/11 season was again over hurdles, at Wetherby. He finished a decent 3rd before being reverted to chasing at Haydock (Grade 1 Betfair Chase) in November. Here he pulled off an amazing performance to finish second to Imperial Commander having been virtually tailed off with a circuit still to travel. Admittedly however Imperial Commander was always in control and Tidal Bay was slightly flattered by the half length he was beaten by. Next for Tidal Bay was the Cheltenham Trials meeting where he was again second. Once again he tailed himself off before staying on strongly as Neptune Collonges faded. Tidal Bay started at around 14-1 for the Cheltenham Gold Cup. He travelled well through the first circuit, then once again he idled and found himself at one point over 80 yards behind the leaders with 4 fences remaining only to produce his incredible finish at the end of the race to go down by under 14 lengths to Long Run. His final race of the season was the John Smiths Grand National. There were high hopes for him before the race with many thinking that his Gold Cup performance made him "well in" at the weights. He unseated his rider on the first circuit – too early in the race to know if he was going to be involved at the finish.

=== 2011/12 season ===
Tidal Bay's only win of the 2011/12 season came when beating Roalco De Farges by 15 lengths to win the Bet365 Gold Cup at Sandown Park.

=== 2012/13 season ===
He started the 2012/13 season by winning the West Yorkshire Hurdle.

In his next race, the Hennessy Gold Cup, he finished 2nd to Cheltenham Gold Cup winner Bobs Worth by 3 lengths despite carrying top weight.

He was then sent to Ireland to contest the Lexus Chase. He produced his trademark late surge to win the race beating First Lieutenant, Flemenstar, and Sir Des Champs in a four way go for the line.
