= Nigel Twiston-Davies =

British racehorse trainer

Nigel (right) and Sam Twiston-Davies at Aintree circa 2010-2012

Nigel Twiston-Davies (born 16 May 1957, Crickhowell) is a British racehorse trainer specialising in National Hunt racing. He is based at stables at Naunton, Gloucestershire.

He began training in 1981 and sent out his first winner, Last of the Foxes, at Hereford Racecourse in 1982.

He has trained over 1000 winners under National Hunt rules including two winners of the Grand National with Earth Summit in 1998 and Bindaree in 2002, and the winner of the 2010 Cheltenham Gold Cup with Imperial Commander. He also trained Imperial Commander to win the Ryanair Chase at the 2009 Cheltenham Festival.

== Personal life ==
His sons, Sam and William, both became jockeys. William retired in 2017.

== Cheltenham winners (17) ==
- Cheltenham Gold Cup - (1) Imperial Commander (2010
- Supreme Novices' Hurdle - (1) Arctic Kinsman (1994)
- Ballymore Novices' Hurdle - (3) Gaelstrom (1993), Fundamentalist (2004), The New One (2013)
- Broadway Novices' Chase - (2) Young Hustler (1993), Blaklion (2016)
- Triumph Hurdle - (1) Upgrade (1998)
- Champion Bumper - (1) Ballyandy (2016)
- Ryanair Chase - (1) Imperial Commander (2009)
- Festival Trophy Handicap Chase - (1) Tipping Tim (1992)
- National Hunt Chase Challenge Cup - (1) Tricky Trickster (2009)
- Johnny Henderson Grand Annual Chase - (1) Pigeon Island (2010)
- Pertemps Final - (2) Rubhahunish (2000), Ballyfitz (2008)
- Fulke Walwyn Kim Muir Challenge Cup - (1) Same Difference (2013)
- St James's Place Festival Hunter Chase - (1) Baby Run (2010)

== Major wins ==
(United Kingdom) Great Britain

- Grand National - (2) Earth Summit (1998), Bindaree (2002)
- Betfair Chase - (4) Imperial Commander (2010), Bristol De Mai (2017,2018,2020)
- Long Walk Hurdle - (2) Sweet Duke (1993), Ocean Hawk (1996)
- Kauto Star Novices' Chase - (2) Dakyns Boy (1992), Ollie Magern (2004)
- Finale Juvenile Hurdle - (1) Bristol De Mai (2014)
- Challow Novices' Hurdle - (2) King's Road (1998), Bindaree (1999)
- Ascot Chase - (1) Riders On the Storm (2020)
- Scilly Isles Novices' Chase - (3) Young Hustler (1993), Jack Doyle (1998), Bristol De Mai (2016)
- Manifesto Novices' Chase - (1) Flying Angel (2017)
- Aintree Hurdle - (3) Mister Morose (2000), Khyber Kim (2010), The New One (2014)
- Sefton Novices' Hurdle - (3) King's Road (1999), Pettifour (2008), Ballyoptic (2016)
- Liverpool Hurdle - (2) Mrs Muck (1987), Sweet Duke (1993)
- Formby Novices' Hurdle - (1) Potters Charm (2024)

(Republic of Ireland) Ireland

- Champion INH Flat Race - (1) King's Road (1998)
- Champion Stayers Hurdle - (1) Rubhahunish (2000)
