= Miss Alleged =

French Thoroughbred racehorse

- Sire: Alleged
- Grandsire: Hoist the Flag
- Dam: Miss Tusculum
- Damsire: Boldnesian
- Sex: Filly
- Foaled: 1987
- Country: United States
- Colour: Bay
- Breeder: Carl M. Freeman
- Owner: Fares Farm
- Trainer: 1) Pascal Bary; 2) Charlie Whittingham (12/91)
- Record: 15: 5-4-3
- Earnings: US$1,757,342

Major wins
- Prix de Malleret (1990); Prix de Royaumont (1990); Hollywood Turf Cup Stakes (1991) Breeders' Cup wins: Breeders' Cup Turf (1991)

Awards
- American Champion Female Turf Horse (1991)

Miss Alleged (1987–2008) was a French Thoroughbred racehorse who was a Champion in the United States and one of only two fillies to ever win the Breeders' Cup Turf.

== Background ==
Foaled in Kentucky, she was out of the mare, Miss Tusculum. Her sire was Alleged, the 1977 European Horse of the Year who won back-to-back runnings of the Prix de l'Arc de Triomphe. Purchased and raced by Beirut, Lebanon businessman Issam M. Fares, Miss Alleged was trained by Pascal Bary.

== Racing career ==
The filly did not start at age two, but in four starts at age three she compiled three wins and a second in the Group One Prix Vermeille. Following ankle surgery, Miss Alleged did not return to racing until May 1991. She ran second in the Prix du Prince d'Orange and was third in both the Grand Prix d'Evry and the Prix Jean de Chaudenay. Sent to Churchill Downs in Louisville, Kentucky, for the November 2, 1991 1½ mile Grade I Breeders' Cup Turf, Miss Alleged was ridden to victory by her regular jockey, Éric Legrix. Against a male-dominated field, she was an upset winner in the $2 million race over Itsallgreektome (2nd) Quest For Fame (3rd), Sky Classic (4th), and the betting favorite, Pistolet Bleu (5th).

After her Breeders' Cup win, Miss Alleged's owners raced her in the United States and sent her to California-based Hall of Fame trainer Charlie Whittingham. On December 15, 1991, Miss Alleged followed up on her Breeders' Cup win with another major victory over her male counterparts in the Grade I Hollywood Turf Cup Stakes. For her 1991 performances, Miss Alleged was voted the Eclipse Award as the American Champion Female Turf Horse. As a five-year-old, Miss Alleged raced in California without a win in her three starts but earned a second in the San Juan Capistrano Invitational and Santa Barbara Handicaps plus a third in the San Luis Obispo Handicap.

== Breeding record ==
Retired to broodmare duty at Issam Fares' Haras de Manneville in Banneville-la-Campagne, France, Miss Alleged produced thirteen offspring, none of which achieved her racing success. She suffered complications after giving birth to her thirteenth foal in 2008, and had to be humanely euthanized on February 28.

== Pedigree ==
Pedigree of Miss Alleged
Sire Alleged	Hoist The Flag	Tom Rolfe	Ribot
Sire Alleged	Hoist The Flag	Tom Rolfe	Pocahontas
Sire Alleged	Hoist The Flag	Wavy Navy	War Admiral
Sire Alleged	Hoist The Flag	Wavy Navy	Triomphe
Sire Alleged	Princess Pout	Prince John	Princequillo
Sire Alleged	Princess Pout	Prince John	Not Afraid
Sire Alleged	Princess Pout	Determined Lady	Determine
Sire Alleged	Princess Pout	Determined Lady	Tumbling
Dam Miss Tusculum	Boldnesian	Bold Ruler	Nasrullah
Dam Miss Tusculum	Boldnesian	Bold Ruler	Miss Disco
Dam Miss Tusculum	Boldnesian	Alanesian	Polynesian
Dam Miss Tusculum	Boldnesian	Alanesian	Alablue
Dam Miss Tusculum	Sailor Town	Sailor	Eight Thirty
Dam Miss Tusculum	Sailor Town	Sailor	Flota
Dam Miss Tusculum	Sailor Town	Dashing	Relic
Dam Miss Tusculum	Sailor Town	Dashing	Cute Trick
