= Cleeve Hurdle =

Hurdle horse race in Britain

Cleeve Hurdle
2026
| Ma Shantou | Impose Toi | Doddiethegreat |

Previous years
2025
Gowel Road | Monmiral | Botox Has
2024
Noble Yeats | Paisley Park | Strong Leader
2023
Gold Tweet | Dashel Drasher | Paisley Park
2022
Paisley Park | Champ | Lisnagar Oscar

2020-2011
2020
Paisley Park | Summerville Boy | Lisnagar Oscar
2019
Paisley Park | West Approach | Black Op
2018
Agrapart | Wholestone | Colin's Sister
2017
Unowhatimeanharry | Cole Harden | West Approach
2016
Thistlecrack | Ptit Zig | The Romford Pele
2015
Saphir Du Rheu | Reve De Sivola | Un Temps Pour Tout
2014
Knockara Beau | At Fishers Cross | Big Buck's
2013
Reve De Sivola | Oscar Whisky | Kentford Grey Lady
2012
Big Buck's | Dynaste | Mourad
2011
Grands Crus | Knockara Beau | Restless Harry

2010-2001
2010
Tidal Bay | Time For Rupert | Katchit
2009
Big Buck's | Punchestowns | Fair Along
2008
Inglis Drever | Blazing Bailey | Gone To Lunch
2007
Blazing Bailey | Inglis Drever | Flight Leader
2006
Fire Dragon | Mighty Man | Westender
2005
Patriarch Express | Korelo | Westender
2004
Crystal d'Ainay | Hardy Eustace | The French Furze
2003
Classified | Mr Cool | Sudden Shock
2002
Kates Charm | Montalcino | Mister Morose
2001
Lady Rebecca | Mister Banjo | Anzum

2000-1991
2000
Lady Rebecca | Bacchanal | Count Campioni
1999
Lady Rebecca | Silver Wedge | Commanche Court
1998
Mistinguett | Bimsey | Ivor's Flutter
1997
Large Action | Pridwell | Castle Sweep
1995
Mudahim | Atours | Meditator
1994
Flakey Dove | Sweet Duke | Mole Board
1993
Muse | Nomadic Way | Mudahim
1991
Crystal Spirit | Mutare | Yorkshire Holly

1990-1988
1990
Beech Road | Slalom | Propero
1989
Calapaez | Green Willow | Ruby Flight
1988
Cloughtaney | Mrs Muck | Beech Road

The Cleeve Hurdle is a Grade 2 National Hunt hurdle race in Great Britain which is open to horses aged five years or older. It is run on the New Course at Cheltenham over a distance of about 3 miles (2 miles 7 furlongs and 213 yards, or 4,822 metres), and during its running there are twelve hurdles to be jumped. The race is scheduled to take place each year in January.

The race was first run in 1983 over a distance of 2 miles 5 furlongs and 110 yards. In the late 1980s the event was classed at Listed level, and its full title was the Bishops Cleeve Hurdle. It was promoted to Grade 1 status in 1991, and in the following years its title was shortened to the present form. It was downgraded to Grade 2 status in 2004, and its distance was extended to the present length in 2005. In its analysis of that year's running, the Racing Post commented that the modified Cleeve Hurdle was "effectively replacing the long-distance hurdle formerly run at Haydock on Peter Marsh day."

The race is now a leading trial for the Stayers' Hurdle at the Cheltenham Festival.

== Winners ==
| Year | Winner | Age | Jockey | Trainer |
|---|---|---|---|---|
| 1983 | Al Kuwait | 7 | John Francome | Fred Winter |
| 1984 | Buckbe | 5 | Colin Brown | David Elsworth |
| 1985 | Rose Ravine | 6 | Ricky Pusey | Fulke Walwyn |
| 1986 | Stans Pride | 9 | Ronnie Beggan | G Price |
| 1987 | Abandoned due to frost |
| 1988 | Cloughtaney | 7 | Tony Mullins | Paddy Mullins |
| 1989 | Calapaez | 5 | Simon Sherwood | Brooke Sanders |
| 1990 | Beech Road | 8 | Richard Guest | Toby Balding |
| 1991 | Crystal Spirit | 4 | Jimmy Frost | Ian Balding |
| 1992 | Abandoned due to frost |
| 1993 | Muse | 6 | Paul Holley | David Elsworth |
| 1994 | Flakey Dove | 8 | Richard Dunwoody | Richard Price |
| 1995 | Mudahim | 9 | Norman Williamson | Chris Broad |
| 1996 | Abandoned due to frost |
| 1997 | Large Action | 9 | Jamie Osborne | Oliver Sherwood |
| 1998 | Mistinguett | 6 | Carl Llewellyn | Nigel Twiston-Davies |
| 1999 | Lady Rebecca | 7 | Norman Williamson | Venetia Williams |
| 2000 | Lady Rebecca | 8 | Norman Williamson | Venetia Williams |
| 2001 | Lady Rebecca | 9 | Norman Williamson | Venetia Williams |
| 2002 | Kates Charm | 9 | Mick Fitzgerald | Robert Alner |
| 2003 | Classified | 7 | Tony McCoy | Martin Pipe |
| 2004 | Crystal d'Ainay | 5 | Jimmy McCarthy | Alan King |
| 2005 | Patriarch Express | 8 | Jim Culloty | Sue Smith |
| 2006 (Note: The 2006 running took place at Sandown Park) | Fire Dragon | 5 | Tony McCoy | Jonjo O'Neill |
| 2007 | Blazing Bailey | 5 | Robert Thornton | Alan King |
| 2008 | Inglis Drever | 9 | Richard Johnson | Howard Johnson |
| 2009 | Big Buck's | 6 | Ruby Walsh | Paul Nicholls |
| 2010 | Tidal Bay | 9 | Brian Hughes | Howard Johnson |
| 2011 | Grands Crus | 6 | Tom Scudamore | David Pipe |
| 2012 | Big Buck's | 9 | Ruby Walsh | Paul Nicholls |
| 2013 | Reve De Sivola | 9 | Richard Johnson | Nick Williams |
| 2014 | Knockara Beau | 11 | Jan Faltejsek | George Charlton |
| 2015 | Saphir Du Rheu | 6 | Sam Twiston-Davies | Paul Nicholls |
| 2016 | Thistlecrack | 8 | Tom Scudamore | Colin Tizzard |
| 2017 | Unowhatimeanharry | 9 | Barry Geraghty | Harry Fry |
| 2018 | Agrapart | 7 | Lizzie Kelly | Nick Williams |
| 2019 | Paisley Park | 7 | Aidan Coleman | Emma Lavelle |
| 2020 | Paisley Park | 8 | Aidan Coleman | Emma Lavelle |
| 2021 | Abandoned due to waterlogging |
| 2022 | Paisley Park | 10 | Aidan Coleman | Emma Lavelle |
| 2023 | Gold Tweet | 6 | Johnny Charron | Gabriel Leenders |
| 2024 | Noble Yeats | 9 | Harry Cobden | Emmet Mullins |
| 2025 | Gowel Road | 9 | Sam Twiston-Davies | Nigel Twiston-Davies |
| 2026 | Ma Shantou | 7 | Ben Jones | Emma Lavelle |

== See also ==
- Horse racing in Great Britain
- List of British National Hunt races
