= Native Trail =

British Thoroughbred racehorse

- Racing silks of Godolphin
- Sire: Oasis Dream
- Grandsire: Green Desert
- Dam: Needleleaf
- Damsire: Observatory
- Sex: Colt
- Foaled: 3 February 2019
- Country: United Kingdom
- Colour: Bay
- Breeder: Le Haras d'Haspel
- Owner: Godolphin
- Trainer: Charlie Appleby
- Record: 11: 6-2-1
- Earnings: £511,848

Major wins
- Superlative Stakes (2021); National Stakes (2021); Dewhurst Stakes (2021); Craven Stakes (2022); Irish 2,000 Guineas (2022)

Awards
- Cartier Champion Two-year-old Colt (2021)

Native Trail (foaled 3 February 2019) is a British Thoroughbred racehorse. He was one of the leading two-year-olds in Europe in 2021 when he was unbeaten in four races including the Superlative Stakes, National Stakes and Dewhurst Stakes.

== Background ==
Native Trail is a bay colt with no white markings bred in England by the Normandy-based Le Haras d'Haspel. As a foal in December 2019 he was put up for auction at the Arqana Breeding Stock Sale and was bought for €50,000 by Sam Sangster Bloodstock. In October 2020 the yearling was consigned to the Tattersalls Yearling Sales and was sold to Margaret O'Toole and Oak Tree Farm for 67,000 guineas. The colt made his third appearance in the sales ring in April 2021 at the Tattersalls Craven Breeze-Up Sale, an event which sees two-year-olds galloped in public before being auctioned. He was bought for 210,000 guineas by Godolphin and sent into training with Charlie Appleby at Newmarket, Suffolk. Native Trail is a very large Thoroughbred who weighed 540 kg as a two-year-old.

He was from the fifteenth crop of foals sired by Oasis Dream, a sprinter who won the July Cup and the Nunthorpe Stakes in 2003 before becoming a very successful breeding stallion. His other progeny have included Midday, Muhaarar and Power. Native Trail's dam Needleleaf was an unraced full-sister to the Haydock Sprint Cup winner African Rose. Needleleaf's dam New Orchid (a half-sister to Distant Music) showed some ability in a brief racing career, winning one minor race and finishing third in the Lancashire Oaks. She was a granddaughter of Populi, who was a half-sister to Temperence Hill and the dam of Vanlandingham.

== Racing career ==
=== 2021: two-year-old season ===
Native Trail was ridden in all of his races in 2021 by William Buick. The colt made his racecourse debut in a maiden race over seven furlongs on good ground at Sandown Park on 11 June. Starting the 8/11 favourite in a ten-runner field he appeared to be struggling a quarter of a mile from the finish, but went to the front inside the final furlong and drew away in the closing stages to win "readily" by four lengths from Royal Patronage. The runner-up subsequently franked the form by winning the Royal Lodge Stakes. A month after his win at Sandown the colt was stepped up in class for the Group 2 Superlative Stakes over the same distance at Newmarket Racecourse and went off the 11/4 second favourite behind Dhabab. In a closely contested finish he overtook Dhabab in the closing stages and held off the late challenge from Masakela to win by a short head. After the race Appleby said "He was strong at the line and I think we saw that at Sandown really... he goes through his gears smoothly and we saw that on his first start and I feel we’ve seen that again today... He's a very laidback character though and this was a good achievement today, but I feel when he steps up in trip in time we will see a good bit of improvement again."

On 12 September Native Trail was promoted to the highest class when he was sent to Ireland to contest the Group 1 National Stakes at the Curragh. He started the 7/2 second choice in the betting behind the Aidan O'Brien-trained Point Lonsdale, who was undefeated in four starts including the Futurity Stakes, while the best fancied of the other five runners was the Phoenix Stakes winner Ebro River. Native Trail tracked the leaders before gaining the advantage from the front-running Ebro River inside the final furlong and went clear of his rivals in "impressive" fashion to win by three and a half lengths from Point Lonsdale. Appleby commented "He's an interesting horse to be around. I took him to a gallop at Newmarket two weeks ago, and if you asked me then would he win a National Stakes I might have been a bit more on the fence, but he came on an awful lot for that... We put a cross-noseband on him too. William said that he was just so green, it was like going to post on an unraced maiden. Two furlongs out, I'm not sure I thought he would win, but I knew he would gallop out strong."

Native Trail ended his season in the Dewhurst Stakes over seven furlongs at Newmarket on 9 October and started the 5/6 favourite in an eight-runner field which included Straight Answer (Blenheim Stakes), Bayside Boy (Champagne Stakes, Go Bears Go (Railway Stakes), Berkshire Shadow (Coventry Stakes) and Dhabab. After racing in second place behind Dubawi Legend, Native Trail took the lead inside the final furlong and won "comfortably" by two lengths. Appleby said "It was one of those occasions that as they were walking around the paddock I was gaining more confidence. I just thought he was the standout and I think we've got a fantastic horse on our hands for next year's Guineas... Once he met the rising ground, the one thing this horse wasn't going to do was stop galloping. It was very similar to his win in the National Stakes and his acceleration, when he's really given the office, is quite remarkable."

On 10 November Native Trail was named Champion Two-year-old Colt at the Cartier Racing Awards.

== Pedigree ==
Pedigree of Native Trail (GB), bay colt, 2019
Sire Oasis Dream (GB) 2000	Green Desert (USA); 1983	Danzig	Northern Dancer (CAN)
Sire Oasis Dream (GB) 2000	Green Desert (USA); 1983	Danzig	Pas de Nom
Sire Oasis Dream (GB) 2000	Green Desert (USA); 1983	Foreign Courier	Sir Ivor
Sire Oasis Dream (GB) 2000	Green Desert (USA); 1983	Foreign Courier	Courtly Dee
Sire Oasis Dream (GB) 2000	Hope (IRE); 1991	Dancing Brave (USA)	Lyphard
Sire Oasis Dream (GB) 2000	Hope (IRE); 1991	Dancing Brave (USA)	Navajo Princess
Sire Oasis Dream (GB) 2000	Hope (IRE); 1991	Bahamian	Mill Reef (USA)
Sire Oasis Dream (GB) 2000	Hope (IRE); 1991	Bahamian	Sorbus
Dam Needleleaf (GB) 2013	Observatory (USA); 1997	Distant View	Mr Prospector
Dam Needleleaf (GB) 2013	Observatory (USA); 1997	Distant View	Seven Springs
Dam Needleleaf (GB) 2013	Observatory (USA); 1997	Stellaria	Roberto
Dam Needleleaf (GB) 2013	Observatory (USA); 1997	Stellaria	Victoria Star
Dam Needleleaf (GB) 2013	New Orchid (USA); 2000	Quest For Fame (GB)	Rainbow Quest (USA)
Dam Needleleaf (GB) 2013	New Orchid (USA); 2000	Quest For Fame (GB)	Aryenne (FR)
Dam Needleleaf (GB) 2013	New Orchid (USA); 2000	Musicanti	Nijinsky (CAN)
Dam Needleleaf (GB) 2013	New Orchid (USA); 2000	Musicanti	Populi (Family: 4-f)
