= African Rose =

British-bred Thoroughbred racehorse

- Sire: Observatory
- Grandsire: Distant View
- Dam: New Orchid
- Damsire: Quest for Fame
- Sex: Mare
- Foaled: 8 May 2005
- Country: Ireland
- Colour: Chestnut
- Breeder: Juddmonte Farms
- Owner: Khalid Abdullah
- Trainer: Criquette Head-Maarek
- Record: 13: 3-2-3
- Earnings: £210,118

Major wins
- Prix du Pont-Neuf (2008); Ladbroke Sprint Cup (2008)

African Rose (foaled 8 May 2005) is a British-bred, French-trained Thoroughbred racehorse and broodmare. She was bred and owned by Khalid Abdullah and trained by Criquette Head-Maarek.

As a juvenile in 2007 she showed very promising form, winning one minor race and being placed in the Prix Yacowlef, Prix d'Aumale and Prix des Réservoirs. In 2008 she won the Listed Prix du Pont-Neuf and then showed improved form when dropped to sprint distances, finishing second in the Prix Maurice de Gheest before recording her biggest win in the Group One Ladbroke Sprint Cup. She remained in training in 2009 but failed to reproduce her best form and was well beaten in three races.

After her retirement from racing she became a broodmare and has had some success as a dam of winners.

== Background ==
African Rose is a chestnut mare with a white blaze and four white socks bred in England by her owner Khalid Abdullah's Juddmonte Farms. Her sire Observatory was a top-class miler best known for an upset victory over Giant's Causeway in the Queen Elizabeth II Stakes in 2000. As a breeding stallion he was best known as the sire of Twice Over. African Rose's dam New Orchid (a half-sister to Distant Music) showed some ability in a brief racing career, winning one minor race and finishing third in the Lancashire Oaks. She was a granddaughter of Populi, who was a half-sister to Temperence Hill and the dam of Vanlandingham.

The filly was sent into training with Criquette Head-Maarek in France and was ridden in all but one of her races by Stéphane Pasquier.

== Racing career ==
=== 2007: two-year-old season ===
On her racecourse debut African Rose was matched against colts in the Prix Yacowlef over 1000 metres at Deauville Racecourse on 3 July. Ridden by Christophe Soumillon she finished second of the eight runners, two and a half lengths behind the winner Stern Opinion. The filly was then moved up in distance for the Prix Vale over 1400 metres at Clairefontaine in August and recorded her first success, beating Aurore by three lengths. African Rose was then moved up in class and distance for the Group Three Prix d'Aumale over 1600 metres at Chantilly Racecourse in September ad finished third behind Top Toss and Mousse Au Chocolat. On her final appearance of the season African Rose finished third behind Gagnoa and Gipson Dessert in the Prix des Réservoirs at Deauville in October.

=== 2008: three-year-old season ===
African Rose began her second season in the Prix Perruche Bleue over 1400 metres on heavy ground at Saint-Cloud Racecourse on 22 April and finished third behind Destare and Belle Et Celebre. A month later the filly contested the Listed Prix du Pont-Neuf over the same distance at Longchamp Racecourse. Starting at odds of 2.6/1 she took the lead 200 metres from the finish and "ran on strongly" to win by one and a half lengths from Salut L'Africain with the favourite Gipson Dessert in fourth. In June over the same course and distance she finished fourth behind Vertigineux, Chantra and Snow Key in the Group Three Prix de la Porte Maillot. African Rose was then dropped back in distance for the Group One Prix Maurice de Gheest over 1300 metres at Deauville in August. Starting a 17/1 outsider she took the lead 200 metres from the finish but was overtaken in the final strides and beaten into second place by the favourite Marchand d'Or.

African Rose was then sent to England for the Group One Ladbroke Sprint Cup. After the meeting at Haydock Park was abandoned the race was rescheduled and run at Doncaster Racecourse over six furlongs on 13 September. African Rose had spent a week in quarantine in the interim but appeared to suffer no ill effects. She was made the 7/2 favourite ahead of the Aidan O'Brien-trained US Ranger, whilst the other thirteen runners included Reverence, Utmost Respect (Chipchase Stakes), Corrybrough (Scurry Stakes), Balthazaar's Gift (Critérium de Maisons-Laffitte), Astronomer Royal (Poule d'Essai des Poulains), Diabolical (Alfred G Vanderbilt Handicap), Ancien Regime (Sprint Stakes), Assertive (Duke of York Stakes) and Wi Dud (Flying Childers Stakes). Pasquier restrained the filly towards the rear of the field on the stands-side (the right-hand side from the jockey's viewpoint) before making a forward move in the last quarter mile. She accelerated into the lead inside the final furlong and held off a strong late challenge from Assertive to win by a neck. Criquette Head said "It is fantastic. Doing what she has done, she has proved she is a good filly. She's tough and she can go anywhere now." whilst Pasquier commented "I am very happy. She's a good filly and although she was a bit excited before the race she showed a wonderful turn of foot".

On her final appearance of the season she finished seventh of the eight runners behind Paco Boy in the Prix de la Forêt over 1400 metres at Longchamp in October, fading badly in the closing stages.

=== 2009: four-year-old season ===
African Rose remained in training as a four-year-old in 2009 but made little impact in three races. She finished fourth to Tax Free in the Prix du Gros Chêne over 1000 metres at Chantilly in May, sixth behind Fleeting Spirit in the July Cup and eleventh to King's Apostle in the Prix Maurice de Gheest. African Rose bled after the race and Criquette Head immediately announced the filly's retirement.

== Breeding record ==
African Rose was retired from racing to become a broodmare for Juddmonte Farms. She has produced five foals and two winners:

- African Plains, a bay filly, foaled in 2011, sired by Oasis Dream. Failed to win in five races.
- Hakka, bay colt, 2012, by Dansili. Won two races.
- Cosmos Pink, bay filly, 2013, by Dansili. Unplaced in her only start.
- Fair Eva, chestnut filly, 2014, by Frankel. Won two races including Princess Margaret Stakes.
- Imhotep, bay colt, 2016, by Kingman. Placed a couple of times but no wins.

== Pedigree ==
Pedigree of African Rose (GB), chestnut mare, 2005
| Sire Observatory (USA) 1997 | Distant View (USA); 1991 | Mr. Prospector | Raise a Native |
| Sire Observatory (USA) 1997 | Distant View (USA); 1991 | Mr. Prospector | Gold Digger |
| Sire Observatory (USA) 1997 | Distant View (USA); 1991 | Seven Springs | Irish River |
| Sire Observatory (USA) 1997 | Distant View (USA); 1991 | Seven Springs | La Trinite |
| Sire Observatory (USA) 1997 | Stellaria (USA); 1986 | Roberto | Hail To Reason |
| Sire Observatory (USA) 1997 | Stellaria (USA); 1986 | Roberto | Bramalea |
| Sire Observatory (USA) 1997 | Stellaria (USA); 1986 | Victoria Star | Northern Dancer |
| Sire Observatory (USA) 1997 | Stellaria (USA); 1986 | Victoria Star | Solometeor |
| Dam New Orchid (USA) 2000 | Quest for Fame (GB); 1987 | Rainbow Quest | Blushing Groom |
| Dam New Orchid (USA) 2000 | Quest for Fame (GB); 1987 | Rainbow Quest | I Will Follow |
| Dam New Orchid (USA) 2000 | Quest for Fame (GB); 1987 | Aryenne | Green Dancer |
| Dam New Orchid (USA) 2000 | Quest for Fame (GB); 1987 | Aryenne | Americaine |
| Dam New Orchid (USA) 2000 | Musicanti (USA); 1991 | Nijinsky | Northern Dancer |
| Dam New Orchid (USA) 2000 | Musicanti (USA); 1991 | Nijinsky | Flaming Page |
| Dam New Orchid (USA) 2000 | Musicanti (USA); 1991 | Populi | Star Envoy |
| Dam New Orchid (USA) 2000 | Musicanti (USA); 1991 | Populi | Sister Shannon (Family 4-f) |

- African Rose was inbred 4 × 4 to Northern Dancer, meaning that this stallion appears twice in the fourth generation of her pedigree.
