= Love Divine (disambiguation) =

Love Divine refers to the religious concept of the Love of God.

It may also refer to:

- Love Divine (1997–2025), British thoroughbred race horse
- "Love Divine, All Loves Excelling", a Christian hymn by Charles Wesley
- "Love's Divine", a song by British singer Seal
