= Beldame Stakes =

- Class: Grade II
- Location: Belmont Park; Elmont, New York, United States
- Inaugurated: 1939
- Race type: Thoroughbred – Flat racing
- Website: web.archive.org/web/20090823055104/http://www.nyra.com:80/Belmont/Stakes/Beldame.shtml

Race information
- Distance: 1 1/8 miles (9 furlongs)
- Surface: Dirt
- Track: Left-handed
- Qualification: Fillies and Mares; Three-years-old and up
- Weight: Weight-For-Age
- Purse: $400,000

The Beldame Stakes is an American Thoroughbred horse race for fillies and mares three-years-old and up. Inaugurated in 1939, it was run as a handicap prior to 1960. The race is held annually near the beginning of October at Belmont Park and currently offers a purse of $400,000.

A Grade I event for most of its history, in 2019 it was downgraded to Grade II.

On August 22, 2009, NYRA announced that the purse for the 2009 Beldame Stakes was increased to $1 million to attract a showdown between Rachel Alexandra and Zenyatta though ultimately neither horse entered the race.

The race is named for the U.S. Racing Hall of Fame mare Beldame who raced between 1903 and 1905. During the 1904 season, she won 12 of 14 starts, beating the best colts of her time, and was voted the Horse of the Year honors.

The first New York bred to win an Eclipse Award, Saratoga Dew, won this race in 1992.

Run at 1 1/8 miles since 1990, the Beldame has been set at various distances:

- 1 1/16 miles : 1939, 1990
- 1 mile & 1 furlong : 1940–1976
- 1 1/8 miles : 1990–present
- 1 1/4 miles : 1977–1989

== Records ==
Speed record: (At current distance of 1 1/8 miles)

- 1:45.80- Go for Wand (1990)

Most wins:

- 2 – Fairy Chant (1940, 1941)
- 2 – Next Move (1950, 1952)
- 2 – Gamely (1968, 1969)
- 2 – Susan's Girl (1972, 1975)
- 2 – Desert Vixen (1973, 1974)
- 2 – Love Sign (1980, 1981)
- 2 – Lady's Secret (1985, 1986)
- 2 – Personal Ensign (1987, 1988)
- 2 – Sightseek (2003, 2004)

Most wins by a trainer:

- 6 – Todd A. Pletcher (2007, 2006, 2005, 2010, 2013, 2022)

Most wins by a jockey:

- 5 – Jorge Velásquez (1973, 1976, 1978, 1984, 1985)

Most wins by an owner:

- 4 – Foxcatcher Farm (1940, 1941, 1954, 1960)
- 4 – Ogden Phipps (1983, 1987, 1988, 1994)
- 4 – Godolphin Racing (2002, 2008, 2009, 2015)

== Winners ==
Year	Winner	Age	Jockey	Trainer	Owner	Time
2026	Nitrogen	4	José Ortiz	Mark E. Casse	D.J. Stable LLC	1:48.36
2025	Gun Song	4	John R. Velazquez	Mark A. Hennig	R. Lee Lewis	1:49.45
2024	Raging Sea	4	Flavien Prat	Chad C. Brown	Alpha Delta Stables	1:50.41
2023	Randomized	3	Joel Rosario	Chad C. Brown	Klaravich Stables	1:49.05
2022	Nest	3	Irad Ortiz Jr.	Todd A. Pletcher	Repole Stable, Eclipse Thoroughbred Partners/Michael House	1:52.38
2021	Royal Flag	5	Joel Rosario	Chad C. Brown	William S. Farish	1:50.02
2020	Horologist	4	Junior Alvarado	William I. Mott	Parkland Thoroughbreds & There's A Chance Stable	1:49.01
2019	Midnight Bisou	4	John R. Velazquez	Steven M. Asmussen	Bloom Racing Stable, Madaket Stables, Allen Racing	1:48.86
2018	Wow Cat	4	José Ortiz	Chad C. Brown	Peter M. Brant & Stud Vendaval, Inc	1:47.75
2017	Elate	3	José Ortiz	William I. Mott	Claiborne Farm & Adele B. Dilschneider	1.50.21
2016	Forever Unbridled	4	Joel Rosario	Dallas Stewart	Charles E. Fipke	1:50.24
2015	Wedding Toast	5	Jose Lezcano	Kiaran McLaughlin	Godolphin Racing	1.47.67
2014	Belle Gallantey	5	José Ortiz	Rudy Rodriguez	Michael Dubb, Gary Aisquith, Bethlehem Stables LLC	1:47.55
2013	Princess of Sylmar	3	Javier Castellano	Todd A. Pletcher	King of Prussia Stable (Ed Stanco)	1:47.93
2012	Royal Delta	4	Mike E. Smith	William I. Mott	Besilu Stables	1:48.80
2011	Havre de Grace	4	Ramon A. Dominguez	J. Larry Jones	Fox Hill Farms, Inc.	1:49.39
2010	Life at Ten	5	John R. Velazquez	Todd A. Pletcher	Candy DeBartolo	1:49.29
2009	Music Note	4	Rajiv Maragh	Saeed bin Suroor	Godolphin Racing	1:48.49
2008	Cocoa Beach	4	Ramon Domínguez	Saeed bin Suroor	Godolphin Racing	1:49.50
2007	Unbridled Belle	4	Ramon Domínguez	Todd A. Pletcher	Team Valor Stables	1:48.63
2006	Fleet Indian	5	José A. Santos	Todd A. Pletcher	Paul H. Saylor	1:48.69
2005	Ashado	4	John Velazquez	Todd A. Pletcher	Starlight Stable, Saylor	1:48.88
2004	Sightseek	5	Javier Castellano	Robert J. Frankel	Juddmonte Farms	1:49.60
2003	Sightseek	4	Jerry Bailey	Robert J. Frankel	Juddmonte Farms	1:49.27
2002	Imperial Gesture	3	Jerry Bailey	Saeed bin Suroor	Godolphin Racing	1:50.63
2001	Exogenous	3	Javier Castellano	Scotty Schulhofer	Centaur Farms, Inc. (Vernon Heath)	1:49.20
2000	Riboletta	5	Chris McCarron	Eduardo Inda	Aaron & Marie Jones	1:46.14
1999	Beautiful Pleasure	4	Jorge Chavez	John T. Ward Jr.	John C. Oxley	1:47.74
1998	Sharp Cat	4	Corey Nakatani	Wallace Dollase	Ahmed bin Salman	1:46.20
1997	Hidden Lake	4	Richard Migliore	John C. Kimmel	Tracy Farmer/Robert N. Clay	1:48.26
1996	Yanks Music	3	John Velazquez	Leo O'Brien	Michael Fennessy	1:47.00
1995	Serena's Song	3	Gary Stevens	D. Wayne Lukas	Robert & Beverly Lewis	1:48.60
1994	Heavenly Prize	3	Pat Day	C. R. McGaughey III	Ogden Phipps	1:48.80
1993	Dispute	3	Jerry Bailey	C. R. McGaughey III	Ogden Mills Phipps	1:47.20
1992	Saratoga Dew	3	Herb McCauley	Gary Sciacca	Charles F. Engel	1:46.80
1991	Sharp Dance	5	Mike E. Smith	D. Wayne Lukas	H. Joseph Allen	1:48.00
1990	Go For Wand	3	Randy Romero	William Badgett Jr.	Christiana Stable	1:45.80
1989	Tactile	3	Richard Migliore	Richard W. Small	Robert E. Myerhoff	2:05.20
1988	Personal Ensign	4	Randy Romero	C. R. McGaughey III	Ogden Phipps	2:01.20
1987	Personal Ensign	3	Randy Romero	C. R. McGaughey III	Ogden Phipps	2:04.40
1986	Lady's Secret	4	Pat Day	D. Wayne Lukas	Eugene V. Klein	2:01.60
1985	Lady's Secret	3	Jorge Velásquez	D. Wayne Lukas	Eugene V. Klein	2:03.60
1984	Life's Magic	3	Jorge Velásquez	D. Wayne Lukas	Eugene V. Klein	2:03.20
1983	Dance Number	4	Ángel Cordero Jr.	Angel Penna Sr.	Ogden Phipps	2:00.60
1982	Weber City Miss	5	Ángel Cordero Jr.	Howard M. Tesher	H. Joseph Allen	2:04.20
1981	Love Sign	4	Bill Shoemaker	Sidney Watters Jr.	Stephen C. Clark Jr.	2:01.80
1980	Love Sign	3	Ruben Hernandez	Sidney Watters Jr.	Stephen C. Clark Jr.	2:02.80
1979	Waya	5	Cash Asmussen	David A. Whiteley	Peter M. Brant	2:06.20
1978	Late Bloomer	4	Jorge Velásquez	John M. Gaver Jr.	Greentree Stable	2:02.20
1977	Cum Laude Laurie	3	Ángel Cordero Jr.	Lou Rondinello	Daniel M. Galbreath	2:01.80
1976	Proud Delta	4	Jorge Velásquez	Peter M. Howe	Montpelier	1:46.80
1975	Susan's Girl	6	Braulio Baeza	L. Ross Fenstermaker	Fred W. Hooper	1:48.40
1974	Desert Vixen	4	Laffit Pincay Jr.	Thomas F. Root Sr.	Harry T. Mangurian Jr.	1:46.60
1973	Desert Vixen	3	Jorge Velásquez	Thomas F. Root Sr.	Harry T. Mangurian Jr.	1:46.20
1972	Susan's Girl	3	Laffit Pincay Jr.	John W. Russell	Fred W. Hooper	1:47.40
1971	Double Delta	5	Kenneth Knapp	Stanley M. Reiser	James Drymon	1:48.60
1970	Shuvee	4	Ron Turcotte	Willard C. Freeman	Anne Minor Stone	1:48.00
1969	Gamely	5	Laffit Pincay Jr.	James W. Maloney	William Haggin Perry	1:49.20
1968	Gamely	4	Laffit Pincay Jr.	James W. Maloney	William Haggin Perry	1:49.60
1967	Mac's Sparkler	5	William Boland	H. Allen Jerkens	Hobeau Farm	1:49.40
1966	Summer Scandal	4	Walter Blum	Woods Garth	Harborvale Stable	1:49.40
1965	What a Treat	3	John L. Rotz	Sylvester Veitch	George D. Widener Jr.	1:49.20
1964	Tosmah	3	Sam Boulmetis Sr.	Joseph W. Mergler	Briardale Farm	1:49.60
1963	Oil Royalty	5	Manuel Ycaza	Edward A. Neloy	John R. Gaines	1:51.00
1962	Cicada	3	Bill Shoemaker	Casey Hayes	Meadow Stable	1:48.20
1961	Airmans Guide	4	Howard Grant	Burton B. Williams	Hugh A. Grant Sr.	1:49.40
1960	Berlo	3	Eric Guerin	Richard E. Handlen	Foxcatcher Farm	1:49.40
1959	Tempted	4	Eldon Nelson	Henry S. Clark	Mooring Stable	1:50.20
1958	Outer Space	4	William Harmatz	James W. Maloney	Mrs. Gerard S. Smith	1:49.40
1957	Pucker Up	4	Bill Shoemaker	James P. Conway	Ada L. Rice	1:49.40
1956	Levee	3	Ray Broussard	Norman McLeod	Vernon G. Cardy	1:50.00
1955	Lalun	3	Henry Moreno	Loyd Gentry Jr.	Cain Hoy Stable	1:52.00
1954	Parlo	3	Eric Guerin	Richard E. Handlen	Foxcatcher Farm	1:49.40
1953	Atalanta	5	Harrison Wilson	Jack Long	Darby Dan Farm	1:52.20
1952	Next Move	5	Eric Guerin	William C. Winfrey	Alfred G. Vanderbilt II	1:51.00
1952	Real Delight	3	Eddie Arcaro	Horace A. Jones	Calumet Farm	1:51.00
1951	Thelma Berger	4	Bill Shoemaker	John B. Theall	Joe W. Brown	1:52.00
1950	Next Move	3	Nick Combest	William C. Winfrey	Alfred G. Vanderbilt II	1:50.20
1949	Miss Request	4	Eddie Arcaro	James P. Conway	Florence Whitaker	1:52.80
1948	Conniver	4	Douglas Dodson	William Post	Harry La Montagne	1:52.40
1947	Snow Goose	3	Ted Atkinson	Oscar White	Walter M. Jeffords Sr.	1:52.00
1947	But Why Not	3	Eddie Arcaro	Max Hirsch	King Ranch	1:51.80
1946	Gallorette	4	Job Dean Jessop	Edward A. Christmas	William L. Brann	1:51.40
1946	Bridal Flower	3	Abelardo Delara	James W. Smith	Edward R. Bradley	1:51.20
1945	War Date	3	Arnold Kirkland	Tom Smith	Maine Chance Farm	1:51.00
1944	Donita's First	3	Ted Atkinson	Preston M. Burch	Longchamps Farms	1:51.80
1943	Mar-Kell	4	Billie Thompson	Ben A. Jones	Calumet Farm	1:51.60
1942	Vagrancy (DH)	3	James Stout	Jim Fitzsimmons	Belair Stud	1:50.00
1942	Barrancosa (DH)	7	Eddie Arcaro	Lindsay C. Howard	Binglin Stable	1:50.00
1941	Fairy Chant	4	Irving Anderson	Richard E. Handlen	Foxcatcher Farm	1:51.00
1940	Fairy Chant	3	Irving Anderson	Richard E. Handlen	Foxcatcher Farm	1:50.80
1939	Nellie Bly	3	Joseph Renick	George H. Bostwick	George H. Bostwick	1:43.00
