= Il Mercato =

Argentinian thoroughbred racehorse

- Sire: Not For Sale
- Grandsire: Parade Marshal
- Dam: Equal Pretty
- Damsire: Equalize
- Sex: Stallion
- Foaled: September 11, 2015 (age 10)
- Country: Argentina
- Colour: Bay
- Breeder: Haras La Pasion
- Owner: Rubio B.
- Trainer: Juan Sebastián Maldotti
- Record: 7: 2-3-2
- Earnings: $6,437,250ARS $178,831 USD

Major wins
- Gran Premio Carlos Pellegrini (2018)

Awards
- Argentine Horse of the Year (2018) Argentine Champion Three-Year-Old Male (2018) Argentine Champion Stayer (2018)

Il Mercato is a retired Argentinian Thoroughbred racehorse who was 2018 Argentinian Horse of the Year. He won two of his seven races, including the G1 Gran Premio Carlos Pellegrini, and never finished worse than third.

== Background ==
Il Mercato was bred by Haras La Pasion and foaled on September 11, 2015. Il Mercato was considered well-bred, with his sire Not For Sale being a champion sire in Argentina and his dam the daughter of Rubia Pretty, one of the foundation mares of the Haras La Pasion, and part of a notable Argentinian family. Based on his morning works, even before he ran his first race, Il Mercato was very highly regarded as a two-year-old. He was trained by the father-son pair of Juan Carlos Maldotti and Juan Sebastián Maldotti, although only the latter was credited as his trainer in official reports.

== Racing career ==
Il Mercato debuted in the Clásico José B. Zubiaurre at the Hipódromo de San Isidro as the strong favorite. He ran well, but not to the expectations set by his morning works, and finished second to surprise winner Paco Dabbler. He ran second and third in his next two races to poorly regarded horses before breaking his maiden in his fourth race: the 2200 metres (1.4 mi) Premio 51°Aniversario del Rotary Club de Caballito. Following the victory, Il Mercato was pointed towards the Group 1 Gran Premio Nacional (Argentine Derby), the final race of the Argentinian Triple Crown.

Il Mercato's next race was the Group 2 Clásico Eduardo Casey, the second race in the 'Maldotti Road' of prep races for the Gran Premio Nacional, named after Il Mercato's trainer, Juan Carlos Maldotti. The first race of the 'Maldotti Road' is the Group 3 Clásico Coronel Miguel F. Martínez, won that year by Interboy, who was also entered in the Clásico Eduardo Casey as the favorite. In the race, Il Mercato ran in front early on, but was passed by Interboy only a few hundred meters in, and finished second in the race.

The 2018 Gran Premio Nacional was considered to have a field of lesser quality than it otherwise would have with the absence of Grecko (later named the Argentine Champion Two-Year-Old Male of the generation), American Tattoo (winner of the G1 Gran Premio Polla de Potrillos, first leg of the Triple Crown), Imagen de Roma (winner of the G1 Gran Premio Jockey Club, second leg of the Triple Crown), and Interboy. Il Mercato was one of the three leading contenders for the race, and started the race as the favorite. Due to heavy rain, the race was postponed one week. Il Mercato finished third in the race, behind surprise winner For the Top and the longshot True Dreams.

Il Mercato next ran in the Group 1 Gran Premio Carlos Pellegrini, the most important race in Argentina. Based on his prior performances, trainer Juan Carlos Maldotti wanted Il Mercato to be near the front from the start, a strategy that paid off as Il Mercato won the race wire to wire, beating the 2016 winner Sixties Song by a head. Through the Breeders' Cup Challenge series, the victory won him an automatic berth for the 2019 Breeders' Cup Turf. After his win, the main target for the coming year was the Breeders' Cup Turf, with the Group 1 Gran Premio Latinoamericano also mentioned as a possibility.

After winning the Carlos Pellegrini, a half share in Il Mercato was sold to Robert LaPenta and Sol Kumin (owner of Madaket Stable). In January 2019, he was exported to the United States for the Breeders' Cup and joined the barn of Chad Brown at Palm Meadows. Plans were for Il Mercato to have his first race in the United States on the day of the Belmont Stakes, but in late March, Il Mercato sustained a tendon injury in a front leg. Il Mercato was then retired and syndicated, with 40 shares sold.

Il Mercato was named the 2018 Argentine Horse of the Year, as well as Champion Three-Year-Old Male and Champion Stayer, in the annual Distinciones Pellegrini, awards which some thought were undeserved due to Il Mercato's relatively short time racing in the upper levels of the sport and singular Group 1 win. His dam, Equal Pretty, was named Broodmare of the Year.

== Racing statistics ==
Il Mercato's Career Statistics
Date	Age	Distance	Surface	Race	Grade	Track	Odds	Time	Field	Finish	Margin	Jockey	Ref
Apr 25, 2018	2	1500 meters	Turf	Clásico José B. Zubiaurre	Ungraded Stakes	Hipódromo de San Isidro	2.00*	1:33.90	8	2	(6 lengths)	Juan Cruz Villagra	
May 21, 2018	2	1600 meters	Dirt	Premio Farnesio	Maiden	Hipódromo Argentino de Palermo	7.60	1:34.02	14	2	(6 lengths)	Altair Domingos	
Jul 23, 2018	3	1800 meters	Dirt	Premio Mad Speed	Maiden	Hipódromo Argentino de Palermo	2.35*	1:47.26	9	3	(1 length)	Juan Cruz Villagra	
Sep 16, 2018	3	2200 meters	Dirt	Premio 51°Aniversario del Rotary Club de Caballito	Maiden	Hipódromo Argentino de Palermo	2.65	2:15.80	7	1	9 lengths	Juan Carlos Noriega	
Oct 25, 2018	3	2200 meters	Dirt	Clásico Eduardo Casey	II	Hipódromo Argentino de Palermo	3.05	2:15.10	6	2	(5 lengths)	Juan Carlos Noriega	
Nov 16, 2018	3	2500 meters	Dirt	Gran Premio Nacional	I	Hipódromo Argentino de Palermo	3.00*	2:33.78	12	3	(6 lengths)	Juan Carlos Noriega	
Dec 15, 2018	3	2400 meters	Turf	Gran Premio Carlos Pellegrini	I	Hipódromo de San Isidro	17.25	2:28.52	18	1	Head	Juan Carlos Noriega	

An asterisk after the odds means Il Mercato was the post time favorite.

== Stud career ==
Il Mercato was retired to stand at stud at Haras La Pasion in Argentina. In order to give him time to re-acclimatize to Argentina and heal from his injury, his first year at stud was postponed to 2020. During his first year at stud, Il Mercato covered 100 mares, including American Whisper, the dam of three G1 winners.

== Pedigree ==
Pedigree of Il Mercato (ARG), bay stallion, foaled September 11, 2015
Sire Not For Sale (ARG)	Parade Marshal (USA)	Caro (IRE)	Fortino (FR)
Sire Not For Sale (ARG)	Parade Marshal (USA)	Caro (IRE)	Chamborg (ARG)
Sire Not For Sale (ARG)	Parade Marshal (USA)	Stepping High (ARG)	No Robbery (USA)
Sire Not For Sale (ARG)	Parade Marshal (USA)	Stepping High (ARG)	Bebop (FR)
Sire Not For Sale (ARG)	Love For Sale (ARG)	Laramie Trail (USA)	Swaps (USA)
Sire Not For Sale (ARG)	Love For Sale (ARG)	Laramie Trail (USA)	Wildwook (USA)
Sire Not For Sale (ARG)	Love For Sale (ARG)	Museliere (ARG)	Malambo (ARG)
Sire Not For Sale (ARG)	Love For Sale (ARG)	Museliere (ARG)	Romina (ARG)
Dam Equal Pretty (ARG)	Equalize (USA)	Northern Jove (CAN)	Northern Dancer (CAN)
Dam Equal Pretty (ARG)	Equalize (USA)	Northern Jove (CAN)	Junonia (USA)
Dam Equal Pretty (ARG)	Equalize (USA)	Zonta (USA)	Dr. Fager (USA)
Dam Equal Pretty (ARG)	Equalize (USA)	Zonta (USA)	Santa Tina (IRE)
Dam Equal Pretty (ARG)	Rubia Pretty (ARG)	Candy Stripes (USA)	Blushing Groom (FR)
Dam Equal Pretty (ARG)	Rubia Pretty (ARG)	Candy Stripes (USA)	Bubble Company (FR)
Dam Equal Pretty (ARG)	Rubia Pretty (ARG)	Ilimitada (ARG)	Ringaro (USA)
Dam Equal Pretty (ARG)	Rubia Pretty (ARG)	Ilimitada (ARG)	Infinity (ARG)
