= Special Duty =

British-bred Thoroughbred racehorse

- French racing colours of Khalid Abdullah
- Sire: Hennessy
- Grandsire: Storm Cat
- Dam: Quest to Peak
- Damsire: Distant View
- Sex: Mare
- Foaled: 12 February 2007
- Country: United Kingdom
- Colour: Chestnut
- Breeder: Juddmonte Farms
- Owner: Khalid Abdulla
- Trainer: Criquette Head-Maarek
- Record: 10: 4-2-1
- Earnings: £722,059

Major wins
- Prix Robert Papin (2009); Cheveley Park Stakes (2009); 1000 Guineas (2010); Poule d'Essai des Pouliches (2010)

Awards
- European Champion Two-year-old Filly (2009)

Special Duty (foaled 12 February 2007) is a British-bred, French-trained champion Thoroughbred racehorse and broodmare. She won two of her four starts as a two-year-old including the Group One Cheveley Park Stakes and the Group Two Prix Robert Papin and was named European Champion Two-year old Filly at the Cartier Racing Awards. As a three-year-old she recorded a rare double when taking the British Classic 1000 Guineas at Newmarket and its French equivalent, the Poule d'Essai des Pouliches at Longchamp. What made the achievement more unusual was that in both classics she crossed the line in second place and was awarded the victory following a disqualification.

== Background ==
Special Duty is a chestnut mare with a white blaze bred in Britain by her owner, Khalid Abdulla's Juddmonte Farms. She was sired by the American stallion Hennessy, whose other progeny included Johannesburg, Grande Armee and Henny Hughes. Special Duty's dam, the Kentucky-bred Quest to Peak, made no impression as a racehorse, but was a sister of Sightseek and a half-sister of Tates Creek (Yellow Ribbon Stakes). As a descendant of the British mare Rosary, Special Duty came from the same branch of Thoroughbred Family 23-b which produced Tim Tam, Winning Colors and Chief's Crown. The filly was sent into training with Criquette Head-Maarek at Chantilly and was ridden in all her wins by Stéphane Pasquier.

== Racing career ==
=== 2009: two-year-old season ===
Special Duty made her debut in the Listed Prix Yacowlef over 1000m at Deauville in July. She started odds-on favourite but was hampered at the start and finished second, beaten one and a half lengths by Sorciere, a filly who went on to win the Prix d'Arenberg. Three weeks later she was moved up to Group Two class for the Prix Robert Papin over 1100m at Maisons-Laffitte. She showed her inexperience ("ran green") in the early stages but took the lead in the closing stages and was ridden out by Pasquier to defeat the odds-on favourite Siyouni by one and a half lengths. After the race, Head-Maarek described Special Duty as "a progressive type who could go on to better things". In October Siyouni won the Prix Jean-Luc Lagardère, France's most prestigious race for two-year-olds. A month later, Special Duty was matched against the unbeaten English colts Canford Cliffs and Arcano in the Prix Morny at Deauville. Pasquier sent the filly to the front from the start and she held the lead until she was caught in the last strides and beaten a short neck by Arcano in a blanket finish.

In October, Special Duty was sent overseas for the first time to contest the Group One Cheveley Park Stakes over six furlongs at Newmarket in England. She was made 3/1 second favourite behind the British-trained Lady of the Desert who had won the Princess Margaret Stakes and the Lowther Stakes. As in the Morny, Special Duty led from the start but a furlong from the finish she was headed by Lady of the Desert. In the closing stages however, Special Duty regained the advantage and pulled clear to win by two and three quarter lengths from Misheer, who beat Lady of the Desert by a head for second place. The Irish Independent described Special Duty's performance as "scintillating" and Head-Maarek, who was recording her fourth win in the race, praised Pasquier for riding a "beautiful race". The British bookmakers made the filly 8/1 favourite for the following year's 1000 Guineas.

=== 2010: three-year-old season ===
On her three-year-old debut, Special Duty started odd-on favourite for the Group Three Prix Imprudence at Maisons-Laffitte on 8 April. Racing on very soft ground she led until 300m from the finish before finishing third to Joanna and Evading Tempete. Despite her defeat, Special Duty started 9/2 favourite in a field of seventeen runners for the 1000 Guineas at Newmarket on 2 May. On the wide, straight Rowley Mile course, the field split into two groups, with Special Duty restrained by Pasquier at the back of the group on the stands' (left) side. In the final quarter mile, Tom Queally sent the 66/1 outsider Jacqueline Quest into the lead on the stands side from Sent From Heaven and the Irish filly Gile Na Greine as Pasquier made rapid progress on the favourite. In the closing stages Special Duty moved up to challenge Jacqueline Quest but was carried out into the centre of the course as the outsider hung badly to the right. The photo-finish showed that Jacqueline Quest had won by a nose from Special Duty, with Gile Na Greine a head away in third but the racecourse stewards immediately called an inquiry. After ten minutes of deliberation they took the view that the interference caused by the "winner" had affected the result of the race and awarded the victory to Special Duty. Jacqueline Quest's trainer Henry Cecil admitted that the decision was "probably" a fair one.

Two weeks after her win at Newmarket, Special Duty attempted to add the Poule d'Essai des Pouliches, a race sometimes known in English-speaking countries as the French 1,000 Guineas. Few fillies had attempted the double and only Imprudence (1947), Miesque (1987) and Ravinella (1988) had succeeded. Special Duty started favourite ahead of Joanna and the Aga Khan's Rosanara. With many fillies held up for late challenges and struggling to obtain clear runs, the closing stages of the race were extremely rough. Pasquier only found racing room in the last 200m and although Special Duty finished strongly, she failed by a head to catch Liliside. Barely a length separated the first six fillies. A "complicated" stewards' inquiry found that Liliside had bumped Full Steam when making her challenge and interfered with Lady of the Desert in the closing stages. Liliside was relegated to sixth place, giving the win to Special Duty.

Special Duty failed to reproduce her best form in three remaining starts. In July she returned to Newmarket for the Falmouth Stakes, but weakened in the closing stages to finish seventh of the eight runners behind Music Show. In this race she was partnered by Tom Queally, Pasquier having been injured in a fall. She produced a slightly better effort when reunited with Pasquier in October at Longchamp where she ran sixth to Goldikova in the Prix de la Forêt. On her final appearance she was sent to California where she finished last of the seven runners in the Matriarch Stakes at Hollywood Park.

== Assessment ==
Special Duty was named European Champion Two-year-old filly at the Cartier Racing Awards in November 2009. In January 2010, she was ranked the best two-year-old filly of 2009 in Europe by the International Classification, with a rating of 117.

== Stud career ==
Having run her last race in California, Special Duty remained in the United States and was covered by Tapit in 2011. Her 2012 filly sired by Tapit, South Bank, was trained in France and finished second in the Prix Yacowlef in 2015. Special Duty has produced foals by Bernardini (2013), Tapit (2014) and First Defense (2015).

== Pedigree ==
Pedigree of Special Duty (GB), chestnut mare, 2007
| Sire Hennessy (USA) 1993 | Storm Cat; 1983 | Storm Bird | Northern Dancer |
| Sire Hennessy (USA) 1993 | Storm Cat; 1983 | Storm Bird | South Ocean |
| Sire Hennessy (USA) 1993 | Storm Cat; 1983 | Terlngua | Secretariat |
| Sire Hennessy (USA) 1993 | Storm Cat; 1983 | Terlngua | Crimson Saint |
| Sire Hennessy (USA) 1993 | Island Kitty; 1976 | Hawaii | Utrillo |
| Sire Hennessy (USA) 1993 | Island Kitty; 1976 | Hawaii | Ethane |
| Sire Hennessy (USA) 1993 | Island Kitty; 1976 | T. C. Kitten | Tom Cat |
| Sire Hennessy (USA) 1993 | Island Kitty; 1976 | T. C. Kitten | Needlebug |
| Dam Quest to Peak (USA) 2002 | Distant View; 1991 | Mr. Prospector | Raise a Native |
| Dam Quest to Peak (USA) 2002 | Distant View; 1991 | Mr. Prospector | Gold Digger |
| Dam Quest to Peak (USA) 2002 | Distant View; 1991 | Seven Springs | Irish River |
| Dam Quest to Peak (USA) 2002 | Distant View; 1991 | Seven Springs | La Trinite |
| Dam Quest to Peak (USA) 2002 | Viviana; 1990 | Nureyev | Northern Dancer |
| Dam Quest to Peak (USA) 2002 | Viviana; 1990 | Nureyev | Special |
| Dam Quest to Peak (USA) 2002 | Viviana; 1990 | Nijinsky Star | Nijinsky |
| Dam Quest to Peak (USA) 2002 | Viviana; 1990 | Nijinsky Star | Chris Evert (Family: 23-b) |
