= Gran Premio Copa de Oro =

Group 1 horse race in Argentina

Gran Premio Copa de Oro - Alfredo Lalor
- Class: Group 1
- Location: Hipódromo de San Isidro

Race information
- Distance: 2400 meters
- Surface: Turf
- Qualification: Four years old and older
- Weight: Weight for age
- Purse: $50,000,000 ARS (2025); 1st: $25,000,000 ARS

The Copa de Oro - Alfredo Lalor (also known as the Gran Premio Copa de Oro) is a Group 1 thoroughbred horse race run at Hipódromo de San Isidro in Argentina, open to horses four years old or older. It is run over a distance of 2400 metres (1.5 mi) on the turf and is considered the last major prep race for older horses for the Gran Premio Carlos Pellegrini.

== History ==
'Alfredo Lalor' was added to the name of the race in 2003 in honor of Alfredo Lalor, president of the Argentine Jockey Club.

== Records since 1988 ==
Speed record:

- 2:22.32 – John Dual (2000)

Greatest winning margin:

- 9 lengths – Matador Marshal (2005)

Most wins:

- 2 – Fantasio (1994, 1995)
- 2 – Grand Vitesse (2002, 2004)
- 2 – Life of Victory (2007, 2009)

Most wins by a jockey:

- 9 – Pablo Gustavo Falero (1996, 1997, 2002, 2004, 2006, 2013, 2016, 2017, 2018)

Most wins by a trainer:

- 4 – Juan Carlos Maldotti (1996, 1997, 2002, 2004)

Most wins by an owner:

- 2 – Haras Vacacion (1988, 1997)
- 2 – Stud La Titina (1994, 1995)
- 2 – Stud E.V.G. (2002, 2004)
- 2 – Stud El Gusy (2007, 2009)

Most wins by a breeder:

- 4 – Haras Firmamento (1993, 2001, 2005, 2018)
- 3 – Haras Vacacion (1988, 1997, 2013)
- 3 – Haras La Biznaga (2000, 2006, 2012)

== Winners since 1988 ==
Year	Winner	Age	Jockey	Trainer	Owner	Breeder	Time	Margin	Ref
2025	Acento Final	4	Gustavo E. Calvente	Nicólas Martín Ferro	Stud Macul	Haras Pozo de Luna	2:26.99	1/2 neck	
2024	El Kodigo	4	Gustavo E. Calvente	Juan Franco Saldivia	Juan Antonio	Haras Marovi	2:28.63	1 1/2 lengths	
2023	Treasure Island	5	F. Fernandes Gonçalves	Nicólas Martín Ferro	Stud Bien de Abajo	Haras El Doguito	2:27.65	4 lengths	
2022	Durazzo	4	F. Fernandes Gonçalves	Rubén Alejandro Quiroga	Haras Marias del Sur	Haras Marias del Sur	2:27.00	4 lengths	
2021	Cool Day	4	Eduardo Ortega Pavón	Alfredo F. Gaitán Dassié	Establec. Mariana Eva	Haras Abolengo	2:26.77	3 1/2 lengths	
2020	Pinball Wizard	5	Juan Cruz Villagra	Jorge A. Mayansky Neer	Stud Don Teodoro	Haras Carampangue	2:25.34	5 lengths	
2019	Emiterio	4	Cristian E. Velázquez	Pablo Gabriel Guerrero	Stud Don Ibaldo	Mauricio Milanese	2:28.28	1/2 length	
2018	Sixties Song	5	Pablo Gustavo Falero	Nicolás Alfredo Gaitán	Stud Savini	Haras Firmamento	2:25.78	2 lengths	
2017	Puerto Escondido	4	Pablo Gustavo Falero	Pablo Ezequiel Sahagián	Stud Facundito	Haras El Mallin	2:25.88	6 lengths	
2016	Must Go On	5	Pablo Gustavo Falero	Nicolás Ferro	Stud Tata y Tigre	Haras Santa Ines	2:26.37	3 lengths	
2015	Es Despues	4	Eduardo Ortega Pavón	José Luis Palacios	Stud Eldorado	Haras Vadarkblar	2:26.87	3 1/2 lengths	
2014	Soy Carambolo	7	Juan Carlos Noriega	Miguel Ángel Suárez	Haras Polo	Haras Polo	2:30.93	Head	
2013	Fragotero	4	Pablo Gustavo Falero	Miguel Ángel Cafere	Stud La Aguada	Haras Vacacion	2:27.75	3 lengths	
2012	Rabid in the Rye	4	Cardenas E. Talaverano	Miguel Ángel Cafere	Stud Las Canarias	Haras La Biznaga	2:28.08	1/2 neck	
2011	Jumbalaya ƒ	4	Altair Domingos	Humberto Luis Páez	Haras La Providencia	Haras La Providencia	2:23.85	2 lengths	
2010	Fuego e Hierro	4	Altair Domingos	Conrado Antonio Linares	Stud Alfa	Haras Santa Maria de Araras	2:23.90	1 1/2 lengths	
2009	Life of Victory	7	Adrián M. Giannetti	Carlos D. Etchechory	Stud El Gusy	Haras Orilla del Monte	2:25.61	3/4 length	
2008	Eyeofthetiger	4	Cardenas E. Talaverano	Ricardo A. Reigert	Stud Don David	Alessandro Arcangeli	2:26.16	1/2 neck	
2007	Life of Victory	5	Rodrigo G. Blanco	Carlos D. Etchechory	Stud El Gusy	Haras Orilla del Monte	2:24.68	2 lengths	
2006	Storm Mayor	4	Pablo Gustavo Falero	Roberto A. Desvard	Stud Starlight	Haras La Biznaga	2:24.50	2 lengths	
2005	Matador Marshal	5	Gustavo E. Calvente	Roberto Pellegatta	Stud Abulagar	Haras Firmamento	2:23.85	9 lengths	
2004	Grand Vitesse	6	Pablo Gustavo Falero	Juan Carlos Maldotti	Stud E.V.G.	Alvaro Vargas Lerena	2:25.39	2 1/2 lengths	
2003	Sterling Ensign	4	Damián Ramella	Ángel R. Urquiza	Stud Raffaella	Haras San Francisco de Pilar	2:24.40	3/4 length	
2002	Grand Vitesse	4	Pablo Gustavo Falero	Juan Carlos Maldotti	Stud E.V.G.	Alvaro Vargas Lerena	2:29.73	1 1/2 lengths	
2001	Gold Fire	6	Edgardo Gramática	Juan Carlos Etchechoury	Stud Eme Ele	Haras Firmamento	2:26.6	v.m.	
2000	John Dual	4	Christian G. Dominguez	Mario Dario Ravettino	Stud El Peje	Haras La Biznaga	2:22.32	1/2 head	
1999	Ixal	4	Daniel Jorge Ojeda	Nahuel Orlandi	Stud Chichin	Haras El Paraíso	2:24.95	1 1/2 lengths	
1998	Snappy John	5	Jorge Valdivieso	Diego Peña	Stud Chopy	Larry Metheney & Thomas Tribolet	2:23.58	2 lengths	
1997	Diddler	5	Pablo Gustavo Falero	Juan Carlos Maldotti	Haras Vacacion	Haras Vacacion	2:25.42	3/4 length	
1996	La Soberbia ƒ	4	Pablo Gustavo Falero	Juan Carlos Maldotti	Stud Los Patrios	Haras El Paraíso	2:23.58	1 1/2 lengths	
1995	Fantasio	5	Carlos Alberto Zuco	Alberto J. Maldotti	Stud La Titina	Haras Income	2:25.36	3/4 length	
1994	Fantasio	4	Walter Hugo Serrudo	Juan Alberto Maldotti	Stud La Titina	Haras Income	2:26.6	3 lengths	
1993	Bullicioso In	4	Rubén Emilio Laitán	Vilmar Sanguinetti	Stud Patria Grande	Haras Firmamento	2:28.8	1/2 neck	
1992	L'Express	4	Horacio E. Karamanos	Ángel Adami	Haras La Borinqueña	Haras La Borinqueña	2:28.8		
1991	Francisbor	4	José A. Agüero	Mario Suárez	Stud Irala	Haras de Mas de Dos	2:26.8	2 lengths	
1990	Romance Moro	6	Guillermo E. Sena	José Juri	Haras Los Moros	José Juri	2:25.8	1 1/2 lengths	
1989	Penita ƒ	5	Miguel Ángel Abregú	Julio Oscar Penna	Julio Felix		2:28.8	2 1/2 lengths	
1988	Brilliantly ƒ	4		Domingo Elias Pascual	Haras Vacacion	Haras Vacacion	2:25.6		

== Earlier winners ==
- 1980: Babor
- 1981: Sake
- 1982: Rebate
- 1983: Bonete
- 1984: New Dandy
- 1985: Ataviado
- 1986: Potrillazo
- 1987: Larabee
