= Twice Over =

British-bred Thoroughbred racehorse

- Racing colours of Khalid Abdullah
- Sire: Observatory
- Grandsire: Distant View
- Dam: Double Crossed
- Damsire: Caerleon
- Sex: Stallion
- Foaled: 2005
- Country: Great Britain
- Colour: Bay
- Breeder: Juddmonte Farms
- Owner: Prince Khalid Abdullah
- Trainer: Henry Cecil
- Record: 31: 12-4-7
- Earnings: £2,027,173

Major wins
- Zetland Stakes (2007); Craven Stakes (2008); Prix Eugène Adam (2008); Foundation Stakes (2009); Champion Stakes (2009, 2010); Eclipse Stakes (2010); Al Maktoum Challenge, Round 3 (2011); International Stakes (2011); Timeform rating: 128
- Last updated on 11 October 2025

Twice Over (foaled 16 May 2005) is a British retired Thoroughbred racehorse and breeding stallion. He was a successful middle-distance performer whose wins included the Eclipse Stakes, the International Stakes and two runnings of the Champion Stakes.

== Background ==
Twice Over is a bay horse bred by Juddmonte Farms, the breeding operation of his owner Prince Khalid Abdullah. Throughout his racing career he was trained at Newmarket by Henry Cecil.

== Racing career ==
=== 2007: two-year-old season ===
Twice Over began his racing career in a maiden race over one mile at Newmarket Racecourse on 4 October. Starting at odds of 4/1 in a seventeen runner field, he took the lead approaching the final quarter mile and won by two lengths from Austintatious. On 3 November he started favourite for the Zetland Stakes over ten furlongs at the same course and won by one and a half lengths from Planetarium.

=== 2008: three-year-old season ===
On 17 April 2008, Twice Over won the Group Three Craven Stakes at Newmarket Racecourse beating the future Breeders' Cup Classic champion Raven's Pass by a short head. He went on to finish third to Tartan Bearer in the Dante Stakes and third to Henrythenavigator in the St James's Palace Stakes before winning the Group Two Prix Eugène Adam at Maisons-Laffitte Racecourse on 27 July. He later ran poorly in the Prix Guillaume d'Ornano at Deauville Racecourse before ending his season by running second to New Approach in the Champion Stakes.

=== 2009: four-year-old season ===
In 2009 Twice Over finished third in the Earl of Sefton Stakes, third in the Lockinge Stakes, fourth in the Prince of Wales's Stakes and seventh in the Eclipse Stakes before recording his first success of the season in a minor event at Doncaster Racecourse in September. Later that month he won the Listed Foundation Stakes at Goodwood Racecourse, beating Perfect Stride by two and a half lengths.

In the Champion Stakes on 17 October, Twice Over started a 14/1 outsider in his second attempt to win the race. The Aidan O'Brien-trained Fame and Glory started favourite in a field which also included Sariska, Never On Sunday (Prix d'Ispahan), Mawatheeq (Cumberland Lodge Stakes) and Doctor Fremnatle (Princess of Wales's Stakes). After being restrained in the early stages, Twice Over took the lead two furlongs out and held on to win by half a length from Mawatheeq.

On his final appearance of the season the colt was sent to the United States for the Breeders' Cup Classic on 7 November at Santa Anita Park. Racing for the first time on dirt he finished third behind Zenyatta and Gio Ponti.

=== 2010: five-year-old season ===
On 27 March 2010, Twice Over came 10th of 16 behind Gloria De Campeao in the Dubai World Cup. On 16 June 2010, he ran second to Byword in the Group 1 Prince of Wales's Stakes on the second day of Royal Ascot. On 3 July 2010, he won the Group I Eclipse Stakes at Sandown Park Racecourse.
On 17 August 2010, Twice Over finished second to Rip Van Winkle in the Group I Juddmonte International Stakes at York Racecourse.
On 16 October 2010, he won the Group I Champion Stakes at Newmarket Racecourse.

=== 2011: six-year-old season ===
On 3 March 2011, Twice Over won the Group 2 Al Maktoum Challenge R3 at Meydan Racecourse. He was subsequently well beaten in the Dubai World Cup, and at the start of the British turf season he finished 6th behind Canford Cliffs in the Group 1 Lockinge Stakes. After this defeat, Twice Over finished 5th behind Rewilding in the Group 1 Prince of Wales's Stakes on the second day of Royal Ascot. He earned his second win of 2011 when beating stable-companion Midday in the International Stakes at York in August before finishing 10th in the Qipco Champion Stakes in October.

=== 2012: seven-year-old season ===
On 19 April, Twice Over began his 2012 campaign running second to the John Gosden trained Questioning in the Group 3 Earl of Sefton Stakes at Newmarket over 9 furlongs. Starting the 6/5 favourite, Twice Over was headed on the post to be beaten by a head with a 1 and 3/4 length gap to Beatrice Aurore back in third. Nine days later, he started 6/4 favourite for the Gordon Richards Stakes at Sandown Park on ground recorded as heavy. Jockey Tom Queally kept the horse in touch when edged right 3 furlongs out and kept on to finish third of the 6 runners. Twice Over finished 9 lengths behind winner Colombian, another John Gosden-trained horse, and 6 lengths behind the second, Poet. Bearing in mind the muddy ground, many discounted this run, and Twice Over's official rating was dropped from 125 to 119. After a break of 70 days, Twice Over was sent off 16/1 for the Coral Eclipse Stakes, a Group 1 race he won 2 years earlier. Held up in mid-field in a handy position throughout, Tom Queally brought the horse through with a forward run and took third with about 2 furlongs left to run. Despite running into some traffic problems, he finished third of the 9 runners, 3 and 1/4 lengths behind winner Nathaniel (another John Gosden-trained horse), who won the previous years King George VI and Queen Elizabeth Stakes. This was dubbed Twice Over's best race of the season so far.

In the Juddmonte International Stakes at York Racecourse on the 22nd of August, he finished 13 lengths 4th behind stable-mate Frankel, who himself (ridden by Tom Queally) finished 7 lengths in front of the second. Twice Over was retired straight after the race and was sent to stud in South Africa. He finished his last season having 4 starts and coming second once, third twice and fourth once. 2012 was subsequently the only season of Twice Over's career where he failed to win a race.

== Stud career ==
Twice Over stands as a stallion in South Africa where his progeny has yielded several Group One winners.
