= Sixties Song =

Argentine-bred thoroughbred racehorse

- Sire: Sixties Icon
- Grandsire: Galileo
- Dam: Blissful Song
- Damsire: Unbridled's Song
- Sex: Stallion
- Foaled: September 24, 2013
- Country: Argentina
- Colour: Bay
- Breeder: Haras Firmamento
- Owner: Haras Santa Elena; Stud Savini
- Trainer: Alfredo F. Gaitán Dassié; Nicolás Alfredo Gaitán
- Record: 16: 5-3-1
- Earnings: ARS: $7,634,033; CLP: $192,000,000

Major wins
- Gran Premio Carlos Pellegrini (2016) Gran Premio Latinoamericano (2017) Gran Premio Copa de Oro (2018)

Awards
- Argentine Champion Stayer (2016); Argentine Champion Older Horse (2018)

Sixties Song (foaled 24 September 2013) is an Argentine-bred thoroughbred racehorse who became the first South American horse to run at Royal Ascot after winning the Group 1 Gran Premio Carlos Pellegrini and Group 1 Gran Premio Latinoamericano.

== Background ==
Sixties Song is a bay horse with a star and two hind socks. He was bred by Haras Firmamento and foaled on September 24, 2013. During his career in Argentina, he weighed 485 to 502 kilograms.

Sixties Icon, Sixties Song's sire, was the first son of his sire Galileo to win a classic, doing so by winning the 2006 St. Leger Stakes. He won several other graded stakes before retiring to stand stud at Norman Court. His first two crops included Group 3 Premio Primi Passi winner Chilworth Icon and Grade 2 Royal Heroine Stakes winner Nancy from Nairobi. Sixties Icon started shuttling to Argentina for the 2012 season, standing at Haras La Pasion, where he would sire Sixties Song.

Sixties Song's dam, Blissful Song, had a mediocre racing career, winning twice in 16 starts. She was sold for $30,000 as a broodmare or racing prospect at the 2009 Keeneland November breeding stock sale to Haras Firmamento, who had her bred to Candy Ride on southern hemisphere time before importing her and her in utero foal in June, 2011. That foal was Celestial Candy, who would go on to win four group stakes races. Sixties Song was her third foal.

Celestial Bliss, Blissful Song's dam and Sixties Song's second dam, was a half-sister to three Group 1 winners, including Paradise Creek and Forbidden Apple. She also produced Celestial Woods, dam of Bobby's Kitten.

Sixties Song was noted to be "very professional and smart" by trainer Alfredo F. Gaitán Dassié. He favored a harder, drier track over a softer one.

== Race career ==
=== Three-year-old season (2016–2017) ===
Sixties Song broke his maiden by six lengths in a 1600-meter race on the turf at Hipódromo de San Isidro after finishing second in a maiden over 1400 meters on the dirt at Hipódromo Argentino de Palermo. In his next race, Sixties Song won again, by five lengths in a 2000-meter turf race for winners of one or two races. Moving into stakes company, he finished fifth in the Group 1 Gran Premio Jockey Club and second in the Group 2 Clásico Provincia de Buenos Aires.

Sixties Song was considered a longshot for the Group 1 Gran Premio Carlos Pellegrini, with most attention being on the favorites He Runs Away, winner of the Gran Premio Jockey Club and Group 1 Gran Premio Nacional that year, and Don Inc, winner of the Group 1 Gran Premio 25 de Mayo that year. Quiz Kid, winner of the previous year's Group 1 Carreras de las Estrellas Classic, led for the first 2200 meters of the 2400-meter race before tiring and falling back. Sixties Song ran far back for most of the race and entering the stretch, but produced a strong closing run with Puerto Escondido, Going Past, and He Runs Away at his side. Sixties Song prevailed over the tight finish by a half neck. Following the victory, offers were made to purchase Sixties Song, but Haras Santa Elena declined. The win gave trainer Alfredo F. Gaitán Dassié his third Group 1 win that day, after Nashville Texan in the Group 1 Gran Premio Felix de Alzaga Unzué and Le Ken in the Group 1 Gran Premio Joaquin S. de Anchorena.

Sixties Song was named the Argentine Champion Stayer for 2016.

For his next race, Sixties Song left Argentina for the first time, heading to Valparaiso Sporting Club in Chile for the Group 1 Gran Premio Latinoamericano, run over a distance of 2400 meters on the dirt that year. On the day of the race, Sixties Song got caught up in a stall, scraping against the wall and receiving a minor injury. He was inspected by a veterinarian and declared safe to run. In the race, Sixties Song ran in fifth to sixth place for most of the race before making a move in the stretch. He took the lead 300 meters from home and held it to win by 2 1/4 lengths. Even prior to the race, there had been discussions about taking advantage of a scheme by Ascot and the Latin American Racing Channel providing the winner with entry in and funds for running in the Group 1 King George VI and Queen Elizabeth Stakes at the Royal Ascot meet, with the Hardwicke Stakes as a potential prep race.

By March 2017, Sixties Song was the top-ranked racehorse in South America.

Before heading out to Great Britain for a try at Ascot, Sixties Song raced once more as a three-year-old in Argentina, in the Group 1 Gran Premio 25 de Mayo, run on May 25, 2017. Sixties Song started as the favorite and led for the first 1 1/4 miles of the 2400-meter race at Hipódromo de San Isidro. Sixties Song tired 400 meters from home, allowing Ordak Dan to slip past him on the inside for the win, with Sixties Song finishing third. The track was very soft for that race.

In preparation for the King George VI and Queen Elizabeth Stakes, Gaitán traveled to Great Britain for reconnaissance, noting the undulating course at Ascot and the right-handed direction rather than the left-handed direction more common in South America. Potential jockeys mentioned for the race included Frankie Dettori, Olivier Peslier, and Silvestre da Sousa along with Sixties Song's usual jockey in Argentina, Juan Cruz Villagra. Sixties Song trained in a right-handed direction during early morning exercise at Hipódromo Argentino de Palermo in preparation.

=== Four-year-old season (2017–2018) ===
Having been bred on southern hemisphere time, Sixties Song turned four on July 1, 2017.

Sixties Song shipped straight from Argentina to London, arriving on July 23 after a 20-hour journey. From there, he traveled to Abingdon Place in Newmarket to train up to the King George. At that point, Jamie Spencer was the intended jockey for the race, although he would end up not riding Sixties Song. The Group 1 Prix de l'Arc de Triomphe was mentioned as a potential race after the King George for Sixties Song.

By July 28, 2017, Gérald Mossé had been decided upon as Sixties Song's rider for the King George VI and Queen Elizabeth Stakes, with early odds of 66–1. On the upcoming race, Gaitán said "We made the right decision to bring Sixties Song here. We know we're fighting with the best horses in Europe and it will be tough. But we know we have an excellent horse. To stay in our country isn't the right way. If you have an excellent horse, like we have, the right way is to take a challenge. It's a risk but we're very proud of what we're doing."

Sixties Song "took hold early" in the King George VI and Queen Elizabeth Stakes, but weakened within the last three furlongs of the finish line, finishing the race last of 10, 35 lengths behind the winner, Enable.

Returning from Great Britain, Sixties Song suffered various health complications due to the stress, including ulcers, kidney problems, and an enlarged spleen.

His first start back in Argentina was the Group 1 Gran Premio Dardo Rocha, the most important race at Hipódromo de La Plata and his first race on the dirt since his debut. Sixties Song was one of the three leading horses for most of the race, but he ceased to be a factor by the time the field entered the homestretch, finishing sixth.

To close out the year and his four-year-old season, Sixties Song contested his second Gran Premio Carlos Pellegrini. Going into the race Puerto Escondido, who had finished second behind Sixties Song the previous year, was considered to be his main rival. Sixties Song ran well early in the race, but failed to perform in the stretch, eventually finishing second to last as Puerto Escondido ran on to win the race.

At the end of 2017, Sixties Song was co-ranked 59th on the World's Best Racehorse Rankings list with a rating of 119.

=== Five-year-old season (2018–2019) ===
In 2018, ownership of Sixties Song transferred to Stud Savini, a partnership of Haras Santa Elena, Stud Mayflower, and Stud Dark Horse, who would own him for the rest of his racing career, and his trainer changed to Nicolás Alfredo Gaitán, son of the Alfredo Gaitán Dassié.

Sixties Song returned to the racecourse on July 13, 2018, in the Group 2 Clásico Chacabuco. He started as the favorite in the 2400-meter turf race and ran midpack for most of the race. Moving into the stretch, Sixties Song threatened for the lead, but never severely challenged, finishing a well-beaten last.

On September 1, Sixties Song ran in the Group 1 Gran Premio General San Martín, also a 2400-meter turf race at Hipódromo Argentino de Palermo. He stayed near the pace, but again weakened in the stretch, finishing sixth.

To address his enlarged spleen that had developed since the King George, Sixties Song was given a change of diet and treatments.

Sixties Song raced again on October 27, in the Group 1 Gran Premio Copa de Oro. The week before the race, Nicolás Gaitán noted that Sixties Song was showing more like his old self again. Sixties Song stalked the pace for much of the race, and in the stretch again showed his ability, going on to win comfortably by two lengths.

With the win and seeming return to form, Sixties Song was well-regarded for the 2018 Gran Premio Carlos Pellegrini. Sixties Song ran second to Il Mercato by a head. The course was heavy, a condition unfavored by Sixties Song.

At the end of 2018, Sixties Song was co-ranked 221st on the World's Best Racehorse Rankings list with a rating of 115. He was named the Argentine Champion Older Horse.

Sixties Song's final race was the Gran Premio Latinoamericano, run in 2019 at Club Hípico de Santiago over 2400 meters on a turf course. He ran poorly, finishing tenth of fourteen.

== Race statistics ==
Date	Age	Distance	Surface	Race	Grade	Track	Odds	Time	Field	Finish	Winning (losing) margin	Jockey	Ref
Aug 6, 2016	3	1400 meters	Dirt	Premio Todo Un Amiguito	Maiden	Hipódromo Argentino de Palermo	3.85*	1:21.75	8	2	(1/2 neck)	Eduardo Ortega Pavón	
Aug 20, 2016	3	1600 meters	Turf	Premio Predador 2013	Maiden	Hipódromo de San Isidro	2.10*	1:35.37	12	1	6 lengths	Eduardo Ortega Pavón	
Sep 17, 2016	3	2000 meters	Turf	Premio Todo Tango Key 2015	Conditional	Hipódromo de San Isidro	1.80*	2:04.93	4	1	5 lengths	Eduardo Ortega Pavón	
Oct 8, 2016	3	2000 meters	Turf	Gran Premio Jockey Club	I	Hipódromo de San Isidro	3.15	1:59.75	10	5	(4 1/2 lengths)	Eduardo Ortega Pavón	
Nov 11, 2016	3	2400 meters	Turf	Clásico Provincia de Buenos Aires	II	Hipódromo de San Isidro	2.60	2:27.64	7	2	(1/2 length)	Eduardo Ortega Pavón	
Dec 17, 2016	3	2400 meters	Turf	Gran Premio Carlos Pellegrini	I	Hipódromo de San Isidro	22.50	2:26.88	15	1	1/2 neck	Juan Cruz Villagra	
Mar 3, 2017	3	2400 meters	Turf	Gran Premio Latinoamericano	I	Valparaiso Sporting Club	9.40	2:24.88	16	1	2 1/4 lengths	Juan Cruz Villagra	
May 25, 2017	3	2400 meters	Turf	Gran Premio 25 de Mayo	I	Hipódromo de San Isidro	2.20*	2:38.64	12	3	(3 1/4 lengths)	Juan Cruz Villagra	
Jul 29, 2017	4	12 furlongs	Turf	King George VI and Queen Elizabeth Stakes	I	Ascot	33/1	2:36.22	10	10	(35 lengths)	Gérald Mossé	
Nov 19, 2017	4	2400 meters	Dirt	Gran Premio Dardo Rocha	I	Hipódromo de La Plata	2.85*	2:31.79	11	6	(12 1/2 lengths)	Juan Cruz Villagra	
Dec 16, 2017	4	2400 meters	Turf	Gran Premio Carlos Pellegrini	I	Hipódromo de San Isidro	7.60	2:29.16	13	12	(24 1/2 lengths)	Pablo Gustavo Falero	
Jul 13, 2018	5	2400 meters	Turf	Clásico Chacabuco	II	Hipódromo Argentino de Palermo	2.75*	2:30.98	9	8	(12 1/2 lengths)	Pablo Gustavo Falero	
Sep 1, 2018	5	2400 meters	Turf	Gran Premio General San Martín	I	Hipódromo Argentino de Palermo	6.40	2:29.12	9	6	(9 1/2 lengths)	Pablo Gustavo Falero	
Oct 27, 2018	5	2400 meters	Turf	Gran Premio Copa de Oro	I	Hipódromo de San Isidro	8.90	2:25.78	12	1	2 lengths	Pablo Gustavo Falero	
Dec 15, 2018	5	2400 meters	Turf	Gran Premio Carlos Pellegrini	I	Hipódromo de San Isidro	3.20*	2:28.52	18	2	(Head)	Pablo Gustavo Falero	
Mar 10, 2019	5	2000 meters	Turf	Gran Premio Latinoamericano	I	Club Hípico de Santiago	10.10	1:56.68	15	10	(14 1/4 lengths)	Pablo Gustavo Falero	

== Stud career ==
Sixties Song retired to stud at Haras El Turf, standing his first season in 2020. His first foals started racing in 2024.

== Pedigree ==
Pedigree of Sixties Song (ARG), bay stallion, foaled 2013
Sire Sixties Icon (GB) 2003	Galileo (IRE); 1998	Sadler's Wells (USA)	Northern Dancer (CAN)
Sire Sixties Icon (GB) 2003	Galileo (IRE); 1998	Sadler's Wells (USA)	Fairy Bridge (USA)
Sire Sixties Icon (GB) 2003	Galileo (IRE); 1998	Urban Sea (USA)	Miswaki (USA)
Sire Sixties Icon (GB) 2003	Galileo (IRE); 1998	Urban Sea (USA)	Allegretta (GB)
Sire Sixties Icon (GB) 2003	Love Divine (GB); 1997	Diesis (GB)	Sharpen Up (GB)
Sire Sixties Icon (GB) 2003	Love Divine (GB); 1997	Diesis (GB)	Doubly Sure (GB)
Sire Sixties Icon (GB) 2003	Love Divine (GB); 1997	La Sky (IRE)	Law Society (USA)
Sire Sixties Icon (GB) 2003	Love Divine (GB); 1997	La Sky (IRE)	Maryinsky (USA)
Dam Blissful Song (USA) 2004	Unbridled's Song (USA); 1993	Unbridled (USA)	Fappiano (USA)
Dam Blissful Song (USA) 2004	Unbridled's Song (USA); 1993	Unbridled (USA)	Gana Facil (USA)
Dam Blissful Song (USA) 2004	Unbridled's Song (USA); 1993	Trolley Song (USA)	Caro (IRE)
Dam Blissful Song (USA) 2004	Unbridled's Song (USA); 1993	Trolley Song (USA)	Lucky Spell (USA)
Dam Blissful Song (USA) 2004	Celestial Bliss (USA); 1990	Relaunch (USA)	In Reality (USA)
Dam Blissful Song (USA) 2004	Celestial Bliss (USA); 1990	Relaunch (USA)	Foggy Note (USA)
Dam Blissful Song (USA) 2004	Celestial Bliss (USA); 1990	North of Eden (IRE)	Northfields (USA)
Dam Blissful Song (USA) 2004	Celestial Bliss (USA); 1990	North of Eden (IRE)	Tree of Knowledge (IRE)
