= Love Divine =

British-bred Thoroughbred racehorse (1997–2025)

- Racing silks of Lordship Stud
- Sire: Diesis
- Grandsire: Sharpen Up
- Dam: La Sky
- Damsire: Law Society
- Sex: Mare
- Foaled: 12 February 1997
- Died: 7 February 2025 (aged 27)
- Country: United Kingdom
- Colour: Bay
- Breeder: Trevor Harris
- Owner: Lordship Stud
- Trainer: Henry Cecil
- Record: 6: 2-2-0
- Earnings: £287,995

Major wins
- Lupe Stakes (2000); Epsom Oaks (2000)

Honours
- Timeform rating 120

Love Divine (12 February 1997 – 7 February 2025) was a British Thoroughbred racehorse and broodmare best known for winning The Oaks in 2000. In a racing career which lasted from August 2000 to June 2001 the filly ran six times and won two races. After being beaten in her only race as a two-year-old, Love Divine won the Listed Lupe Stakes on her three-year-old debut and then won the Classic Oaks over one and a half miles at Epsom. She was beaten in her three remaining races, finishing second in the Yorkshire Oaks and fourth in both the Prix Vermeille and the Champion Stakes.

== Background ==
Love Divine was a bay mare owned and bred by Trevor Harris's Lordship Stud in Newmarket, Suffolk. Her sire Diesis won the rare double of the Middle Park Stakes and the Dewhurst Stakes in 1982, before becoming an "excellent" breeding stallion, producing the winners of at least 25 Group One races including Halling, Diminuendo and Elmaamul. Love Divine's dam, La Sky finished second in the Lancashire Oaks and was a half-sister of the Champion Stakes winner Legal Case.

The filly, who was named after the popular hymn by Charles Wesley, was sent into training with Henry Cecil at his Warren Place stable in Newmarket and was ridden in five of her six races by Richard Quinn.

Love Divine died on 7 February 2025, at the age of 27.

== Racing career ==
Love Divine made only one appearance as a two-year-old, starting 6/5 favourite for a seven furlong maiden race at Doncaster Racecourse in November. Ridden by the veteran jockey Pat Eddery, she led briefly in the straight before finishing second, two and a half lengths behind the winner Hopeful Light.

In early 2000, Love Divine was affected by a viral infection which disrupted her training and prevented her from running in the early trial races. She did not appear again on a racecourse until 24 May 2000, two weeks before the Oaks, when she ran in the Listed Lupe Stakes over ten furlongs at Goodwood. Richard Quinn positioned the filly at the back of the six-runner field before moving forward in the straight. She took the lead a quarter of the mile from the finish and drew clear of her opponents to win by four lengths from the favourite Spinning Top. Following this performance, Love Divine's owners paid a supplementary entry fee of £15,000 to run the filly in the Oaks. At Epsom on 9 June, Love Divine started 9/4 favourite for the Oaks ahead of the Musidora Stakes winner Kalypso Katie, and Petrushka, the beaten favourite in the 1000 Guineas. In a slowly run race, Quinn placed the filly among the leaders from the start and turned into the straight in second place behind Lady Upstage. Two furlongs from the finish, Love Divine went to the front and opened up a clear lead. despite hanging slightly to the right, she ran on strongly in the closing stages to win by two lengths from Kalypso Katie, Melikah and Petrushka. The win gave Henry Cecil a fourth Oaks win in five years and was a second Classic success for Quinn, who had recently taken over from Kieren Fallon as the Warren Place stable jockey. After the race, Cecil described the winner as a very good filly who had done well to recover from the illness he described as "that lung thing". A recurrence of her earlier health problems meant that Love Divine was unable to race again for more than two months.

The Yorkshire Oaks at York in August saw Love Divine matched the 1999 Champion Filly Ramruma, with Petrushka, who had won the Irish Oaks in the interim, also in the field. The meeting of the three outstanding fillies was highly anticipated as one of the "races of the season". Love Divine moved past Ramruma to take the lead in the straight but was overtaken by Petrushka a furlong from the finish and was beaten one and a quarter lengths. Love Divine was then sent to France to contest the Prix Vermeille at Longchamp in September. She led the field early in the straight but weakened in the closing stages to finish fourth, three and three quarter lengths behind the winner Volvoreta. On her final appearance returned to England and was brought back in distance for the Champion Stakes over ten furlongs at Newmarket Racecourse in October. Racing against colts for the first time she finished fourth of the fifteen runners behind Kalanisi, Montjeu and Distant Music.

It was intended that Love Divine would race as a four-year-old, but was retired on veterinary advice in November 2000 after developing problems with her fetlocks.

== Assessment and honours ==
In the 2000 International Classification (the forerunner of the World Thoroughbred Racehorse Rankings), Love Divine was given a rating of 120, making her the equal sixth best three-year-old filly in the world (and the fourth best in Europe), six pounds below the top-rated Egyptband.

The independent Timeform organisation gave Love Divine a rating of 120.

== Stud record ==
Love Divine was retired to become a broodmare for the Lordship Stud. Her second foal was Sixties Icon, sired by Galileo who won six Group races including the St Leger Stakes in 2006.

2002 Love Me Well (GB) : Bay colt, foaled 1 January, by Sadler's Wells (USA) – placed second twice from three starts in France 2005. Died 2006.

2003 Sixties Icon (GB) : Bay colt, foaled 16 February, by Galileo (IRE) – Won 8 races including G1 St Leger Stakes, Doncaster; G2 Jockey Club Stakes, Newmarket; G3 Gordon Stakes, Goodwood; G3 Glorious Stakes, Goodwood; G3 Geoffrey Freer Stakes, Newbury; G3 Cumberland Lodge Stakes, Ascot; LR Festival Stakes, Goodwood in England 2006-8

2004 Kissing (GB) : Chestnut filly, foaled 25 February, by Grand Lodge (USA) – won once from three starts in England 2007

2005 Foal by Red Ransom (USA)

2006 Native Ruler (GB) : Bay colt, foaled 19 March, by Cape Cross (IRE) – winner and 2nd G2 Jockey Club Stakes, Newmarket and 4th G2 Yorkshire Cup, York in England 2009–11

2010 Hamelin (IRE) : Bay colt (gelded), foaled 31 March, by Cape Cross (IRE) – won 3 races and placed 5 times from 13 starts to date (12/06/16) in England 2013–16

2011 Touch The Sky (GB) : Brown colt (gelded), foaled 1 April, by Sea the Stars (IRE) – won 2 races, third and fourth once from 6 starts to date (12/06/16) in England 2013–16

2012 Arabian Oasis (GB) : Bay colt (gelded), foaled 5 April, by Oasis Dream (GB) – won 1 race and 2nd once from 8 starts on the flat and placed third once from 2 start overs hurdles to date (12/06/16)in England 2014–16

2013 Cecile (GB): Bay filly, foaled 11 April, by Dansili (GB)- Unraced

2014 Broodmare aborted

2015 Clooney (GB): Bay colt (gelded), foaled 21 March, by Dansili (GB)- one place in 5 starts

2016 Loveheart (GB): Bay filly, foaled 18 April, by Dubawi (IRE)- winless in 5 starts

2017 Heiress (GB): Bay filly, foaled 2 May, by Kingman (GB)- one win in 2 starts

2018 Not bred

2019 Unnamed chestnut colt, foaled 21 April by Australia (GB)

== Pedigree ==
Pedigree of Love Divine (GB), bay mare, 1997
Sire Diesis (GB) 1980	Sharpen Up; 1969	Atan	Native Dancer
Sire Diesis (GB) 1980	Sharpen Up; 1969	Atan	Mixed Marriage
Sire Diesis (GB) 1980	Sharpen Up; 1969	Rocchetta	Rockfella
Sire Diesis (GB) 1980	Sharpen Up; 1969	Rocchetta	Chambiges
Sire Diesis (GB) 1980	Doubly Sure; 1971	Reliance	Tantieme
Sire Diesis (GB) 1980	Doubly Sure; 1971	Reliance	Relance
Sire Diesis (GB) 1980	Doubly Sure; 1971	Soft Angels	Crepello
Sire Diesis (GB) 1980	Doubly Sure; 1971	Soft Angels	Sweet Angel
Dam La Sky (IRE) 1988	Law Society; 1982	Alleged	Hoist The Flag
Dam La Sky (IRE) 1988	Law Society; 1982	Alleged	Princess Pout
Dam La Sky (IRE) 1988	Law Society; 1982	Bold Bikini	Boldnesian
Dam La Sky (IRE) 1988	Law Society; 1982	Bold Bikini	Ran-Tan
Dam La Sky (IRE) 1988	Maryinsky; 1977	Northern Dancer	Nearctic
Dam La Sky (IRE) 1988	Maryinsky; 1977	Northern Dancer	Natalma
Dam La Sky (IRE) 1988	Maryinsky; 1977	Extra Place	Round Table
Dam La Sky (IRE) 1988	Maryinsky; 1977	Extra Place	Rich Relation (Family: 14-c)
