= Love Sign (horse) =

American Thoroughbred racehorse

- Sire: Spanish Riddle
- Grandsire: Ridan
- Dam: Native Nurse
- Damsire: Graustark
- Sex: Mare
- Foaled: 1977
- Country: United States
- Colour: Dark Bay
- Breeder: Jane Wilbur Clark
- Owner: Stephen C. Clark, Jr.
- Trainer: Sidney Watters, Jr.
- Record: 39: 16-6-6
- Earnings: US$934,827

Major wins
- Alabama Stakes (1980); Athenia Handicap (1980); Beldame Stakes (1980, 1981); Gazelle Handicap (1980); Test Stakes (1980); Ballerina Stakes (1981); Sheepshead Bay Handicap (1981); Hempstead Handicap (1982); Imp Stakes (1982)

Love Sign (foaled April 19, 1977 in Virginia) was an American Thoroughbred racemare who won three Grade I races while competing against exceptionally strong female competition such as Hall of Fame inductees Genuine Risk and Bold 'n Determined.

== Breeding ==
Love Sign was bred by Jane Wilbur Clark and raced by her husband, Stephen Clark, Jr. She was trained by U.S. Racing Hall of Fame inductee, Sidney Watters, Jr.

== Racing career ==
At age two, Love Sign met with little success but at age three in 1980 won five Graded stakes races including Grade I wins in the Alabama Stakes at Saratoga Race Course and the first of two straight editions of the Beldame Stakes at Belmont Park. As a four-year-old Love Sign was still a top contender, winning two Graded stakes plus her second Grade 1 Beldame. At age five in 1982, Love Sign won two more Graded stakes races before being retired to serve as a broodmare.

== Broodmare ==
Although bred to the likes of Slew o' Gold and twice to U.S. Triple Crown Champion Seattle Slew, Love Sign's foals met with no success in racing.

Pedigree of Love Sign
Sire Spanish Riddle	Ridan	Nantallah	Nasrullah
Sire Spanish Riddle	Ridan	Nantallah	Shimmer
Sire Spanish Riddle	Ridan	Rough Shod	Gold Bridge
Sire Spanish Riddle	Ridan	Rough Shod	Dalmary
Sire Spanish Riddle	Spanish Breeze	Windy City	Wyndham
Sire Spanish Riddle	Spanish Breeze	Windy City	Staunton
Sire Spanish Riddle	Spanish Breeze	Spanish Cream	Brown King
Sire Spanish Riddle	Spanish Breeze	Spanish Cream	Two Bells
Dam Native Nurse	Graustark	Ribot	Tenerani
Dam Native Nurse	Graustark	Ribot	Romanella
Dam Native Nurse	Graustark	Flower Bowl	Alibhai
Dam Native Nurse	Graustark	Flower Bowl	Flower Bed
Dam Native Nurse	Indian Nurse	Mahmoud	Blenheim
Dam Native Nurse	Indian Nurse	Mahmoud	Mah Mahal
Dam Native Nurse	Indian Nurse	Gallant Nurse	War Admiral
Dam Native Nurse	Indian Nurse	Gallant Nurse	Omayya
