= Juddmonte =

Horse racing and breeding enterprise

- Type: Private
- Industry: Horse racing
- Founded: 1983
- Headquarters: Newmarket, Suffolk, UK; Lexington, Kentucky, US
- Key people: Prince Khalid bin Abdullah and family, owners; Douglas Erskine Crum, CEO; Barry Mahon, European racing manager; Simon Mockridge, stud director England; Garrett O'Rourke, general manager US
- Website: juddmonte.com

Juddmonte is a thoroughbred horse racing and breeding enterprise. It was founded in 1983 by Prince Khalid bin Abdullah of Saudi Arabia. Upon his death in 2021, ownership passed to members of his family.

== History ==
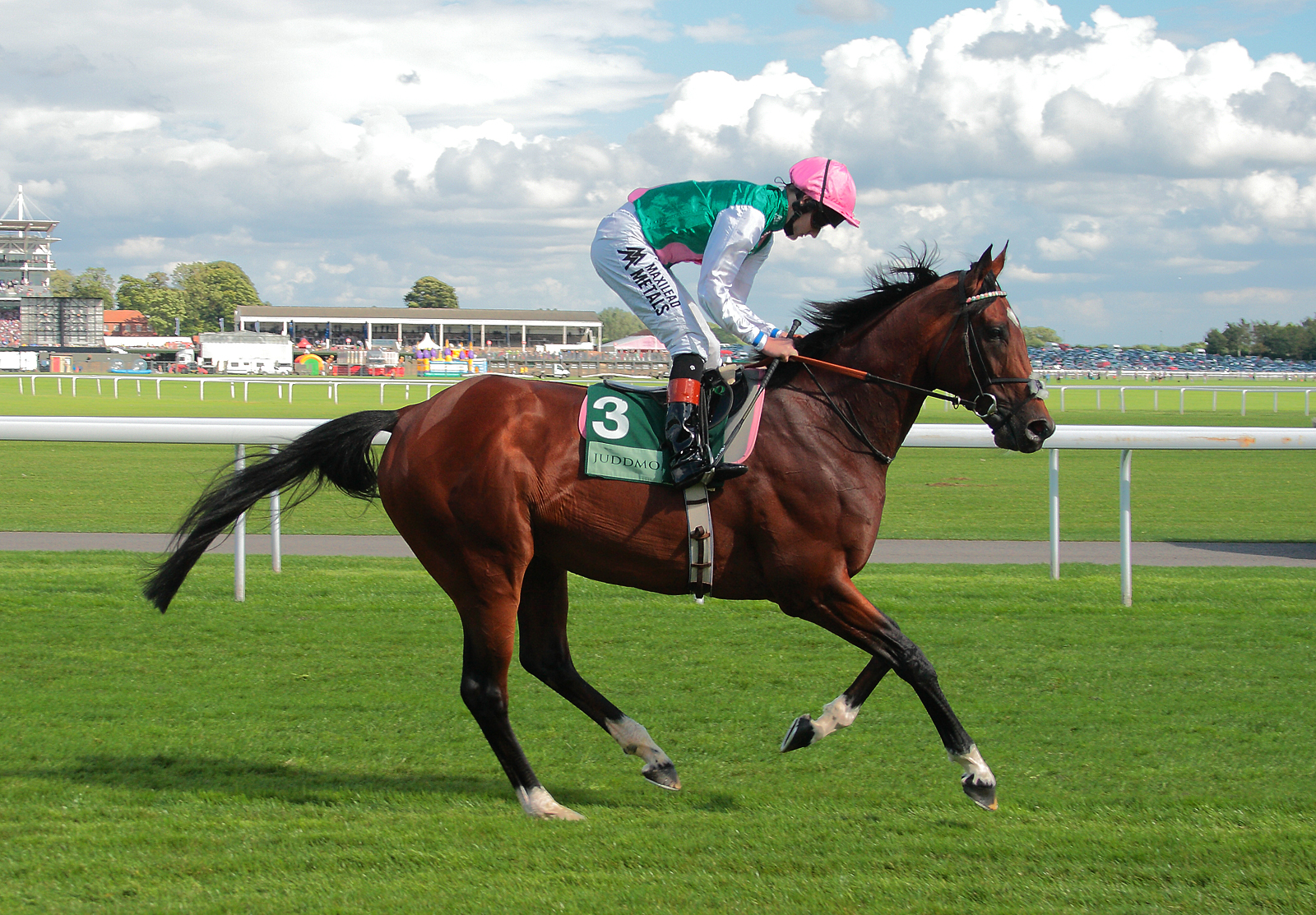
Frankel in 2012 at York Racecourse

Abdullah's participation in horse racing began as an owner in the late 1970s. Having bought his first yearlings in 1977, he secured his first win in May 1979 at Windsor. His first success in a British Classic Race came in 1980, when Known Fact won the 2,000 Guineas after first-past-the-post Nureyev was disqualified for interference.

In 1982, he bought two farms in Wargrave, Berkshire, and branched out into breeding racehorses. That year also saw the purchase of Ferrans Stud Farm near Kilcock in Ireland and a stud farm near Lexington in Kentucky. Juddmonte Farms Limited was incorporated in 1983 to run the business in England. Banstead Manor in the village of Cheveley near Newmarket was purchased in 1987 and became the headquarters of Juddmonte's European operations.

As the business expanded, there were further purchases of estates in England, Ireland and the United States, including Side Hill Stud in Newmarket, Eagle Lane Farm in Dullingham near Newmarket, Estcourt Estate in Gloucestershire, New Abbey Stud in Kilcullen, and two farms in Kentucky. The original Juddmonte farms in Wargrave and one of the Kentucky farms were sold in 2017, when Abdullah decided to reduce the size of his broodmare band.

Dancing Brave, bought by Juddmonte as a yearling, provided Abdullah with his second win in the 2,000 Guineas, and the first of his seven wins in the Prix de l'Arc de Triomphe. Warning, a son of Known Fact, was the first homebred Juddmonte horse to win at Group 1 level, when he won the Sussex Stakes in 1988. Two years later, Quest for Fame was Abdullah's first homebred British classic winner, when he won the Epsom Derby in 1990. Over the next ten years, Juddmonte homebred horses would complete the full set of British classics. Dansili, although never winning at the highest level, became an important sire at Banstead Manor Stud; his dam Hasili bred five Group/Grade 1 winners for Juddmonte. Juddmonte was at the height of its success in 2003, when it was leading owner in Britain and France, and winner of Eclipse Awards as top owner and top breeder in the US. Frankel, named after Bobby Frankel, one of Juddmonte's trainers in the US, appeared on the scene in 2010 and went on to remain unbeaten in fourteen starts, including ten Group 1 races, over three seasons. On his retirement from racing, he became a leading stallion at Banstead Manor. Frankel was followed by the mare Enable, who won eleven Group 1 races, including two Arc de Triomphes and a record three King George VI and Queen Elizabeth Stakes, before joining the band of Juddmonte broodmares.

In 2018, Juddmonte had a total of 800 horses, including stallions, mares, racehorses in training, and young stock. By 2021, it had bred 113 Group/Grade 1 winners, including 28 Classic winners. Following the death of Abdullah in January 2021, Juddmonte remained in the ownership of his family.

== Stud farms and management ==
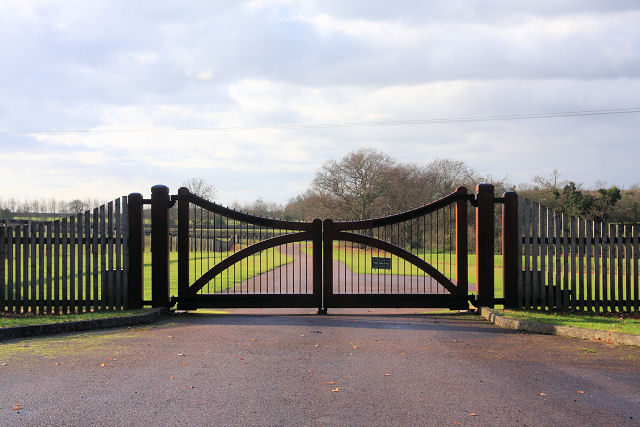
Banstead Manor Stud near Newmarket

As of 2025, Juddmonte has eight stud farms – four in England, two in Ireland and two in the US. Banstead Manor Stud near Newmarket is home to the operation's European stallion roster, consisting in 2025 of Bated Breath, Chaldean, Frankel, Kingman and Oasis Dream. The stallions cover both mares from the Juddmonte broodmare band and mares sent to them by other owners. Covering fees in 2025 ranged from £8,000 for Bated Breath to £350,000 for Frankel. Side Hill Stud in Newmarket provides accommodation for mares and foals, while a farm in Dullingham near Newmarket provides rest and recuperation for horses in training. Once weaned, foals are moved to Estcourt Estate in Gloucestershire, where they graze during the summer months before being shipped to Ireland to spend the winter and spring at New Abbey Stud in County Kildare. Yearlings then go to Ferrans Stud in County Meath to be broken before going into training. The Gloucestershire and Irish farms are also home to broodmares.

Juddmontes's breeding operation in the US is based in Lexington, Kentucky, where two farms accommodate broodmares, yearlings and a roster of stallions. As of 2025, the stallion roster consists of Elite Power, standing at $50,000, and Mandaloun, standing at $15,000. Arrogate was on the stallion roster before his death aged seven in 2020. Abdullah was responsible for planting some 500,000 trees at the Lexington farms.

Douglas Erskine Crum became chief executive officer (CEO) of Juddmonte in 2013, having previously had a career in the army, and been CEO of Ascot Racecourse and the Horserace Betting Levy Board. Mike Saunders, formerly the chief financial officer, became chief operating officer in 2021. Teddy Grimthorpe was Juddmonte's European racing manager from 1999 to 2021. His replacement was Barry Mahon, who was previously Juddmonte's stud director in Ireland, and had been born and raised on Ferrans Stud, where his father, Rory Mahon, was manager. Simon Mockridge manages the studs in England, having started working at Banstead Manor in 1987, while Garrett O'Rourke has been general manager of Juddmonte in the US since 1993. Abdullah was very much involved in the management of Juddmonte, authorising all the breeding decisions and making frequent visits to his stud farms.

== Trainers and jockeys ==
Europe, US, Australia

France

Juddmonte has sent its horses into training with a number of trainers. Abdullah's first winner was trained by Jeremy Tree at Beckhampton in Wiltshire, who went on to train Group 1 winners Known Fact, Rainbow Quest and Danehill, but rejected Dancing Brave, who instead was sent to Guy Harwood at Pulborough in West Sussex. After Tree's retirement in 1989, he was replaced by his assistant Roger Charlton, who saddled Quest for Fame to win the 1990 Epsom Derby. By 2010, Juddmonte was sending horses to thirteen trainers worldwide.

John Gosden had a long association with Juddmonte, starting in the early 1980s in California, where he sent out Grade 1 winners Bel Bolide and Alphabatim, and continuing at Clarehaven stables in Newmarket, where Enable was trained. Michael Stoute at Freemason Lodge Stables and Henry Cecil at Warren Place were other Newmarket trainers with long associations with Juddmonte. Abdullah remained loyal to Cecil during the trainer's lean years in the 2000s and sent Frankel into training with him. Ralph Beckett at Kimpton, Hampshire joined the roster in 2016. Andrew Balding, based in Kingsclere, Hampshire, received his first horses from Juddmonte in 2022. Harry Charlton took over Beckhampton Stables from his father in 2023. Other trainers who have trained Juddmonte horses include Britain Amanda Perrett, who took over from her father Guy Harwood, and Charlie Hills. In 2018, Ger Lyons joined Dermot Weld as the only trainers of Juddmonte horses in Ireland.

André Fabre has been training Juddmonte horses in France since the mid-1980s. By 2023, he had trained 16 per cent of Juddmonte's 127 Group 1 winners. Horses were also sent to Criquette Head-Maarek before her retirement in 2018.</sky> As of 2025, Henri-François Devin and Francis-Henri Graffard, as well as Fabre, were Juddmonte's trainers in France.

Juddmonte horses were trained in the US by Robert Frankel until his death in 2009. More recently they have been trained by Bill Mott, Brad Cox, Bob Baffert and also by former assistant to Robert Frankel, Chad Brown.

For much of its history, Juddmonte has relied on the retained jockeys of its trainers, although appointing its own jockeys on occasion: Pat Eddery from 1987 to 1994; from Richard Hughes from 2001 to 2007. James Doyle was its number one jockey for one season in 2014, before he switched to Godolphin. In 2025, Colin Keane was appointed to the position.

Juddmonte horses run in green, cream and pink colours, chosen by Abdullah to match his curtains. While Abdullah was alive, they raced under the name of K Abdullah; after his death in 2021, they race under the name of Juddmonte.

== Awards ==
=== Europe ===
- British flat racing Champion Owner 2003, 2010 and 2011
- Champion breeder in Britain 1993, 2003, 2004, 2010, 2011, 2012
- Champion owner in Ireland 1993

Juddmonte horses have won the horse of the year category at the Cartier Racing Awards on five occasions:

- Frankel (2011, 2012)
- Kingman (2014)
- Enable (2017, 2019)

=== US ===
Eclipse Awards:

- Outstanding breeder 1995, 2001, 2002, 2003 and 2009
- Outstanding owner 1992, 2003, 2016 and 2017

The following horses have also won Eclipse awards:

- Banks Hill - Female turf (2001)
- Intercontinental - Female turf (2005)
- Close Hatches - Older female (2014)
- Arrogate - Three-year-old male (2016)
- Flintshire - Turf male (2016)
- Flintshire - Older female (2024, 2025)
- Elite Power - Male sprinter (2022, 2023)

=== Worldwide ===
Juddmonte horses have led the International Federation of Horseracing Authorities World's Best Racehorse Rankings on four occasions:

- Frankel (2011, 2012)
- Arrogate (2016, 2017)

== Major wins ==
(United Kingdom) Great Britain

- 1,000 Guineas – Wince (1999), Special Duty (2010)
- 2,000 Guineas – Known Fact (1980), Dancing Brave (1986), Zafonic (1993), Frankel (2011), Chaldean (2023)
- Oaks – Reams of Verse (1997), Enable (2017)
- Derby – Quest for Fame (1990), Commander in Chief (1993), Workforce (2010)
- St Leger Stakes – Toulon (1991), Logician (2019)
- St. James's Palace Stakes – Frankel (2011), Kingman (2014)
- Coronation Stakes – Banks Hill (2001)
- Queen Anne Stakes – Rousillon (1985), Warning (1989), Frankel (2012)
- Prince of Wales's Stakes – Two Timing (1989), Placerville (1993), Byword (2010)
- Lockinge Stakes – Frankel (2012), Lead Artist (2025)
- Coronation Cup – Rainbow Quest (1985), Sunshack (1995)
- Eclipse Stakes – Dancing Brave (1986), Twice Over (2010), Enable (2019)
- King George VI and Queen Elizabeth Stakes – Dancing Brave (1986), Enable (2017), Enable (2019), Enable (2020), Kalpana (2026)
- Sussex Stakes – Rousillon (1985), Warning (1988), Distant View (1994), Frankel (2011), Frankel (2012), Kingman (2014), Qirat (2025)
- International Stakes – Twice Over (2011), Frankel (2012)
- Queen Elizabeth II Stakes – Warning (1988), Observatory (2000), Frankel (2011)
- Champion Stakes – Twice Over (2009), Twice Over (2010), Frankel (2012), Noble Mission (2014)
- Falmouth Stakes – Ryafan (1997), Timepiece (2011),
- Nassau Stakes – Ryafan (1997), Midday (2009), Midday (2010), Midday (2011), Winsili (2013)
- Yorkshire Oaks – Quiff (2004), Midday (2010), Enable (2017), Enable (2019)
- Golden Jubilee Stakes – Danehill (1989)
- July Cup – Oasis Dream (2003)
- Nunthorpe Stakes – Oasis Dream (2003)
- Haydock Sprint Cup – Dowsing (1988), Danehill (1989), African Rose (2008)
- Dewhurst Stakes – Zafonic (1992), Xaar (1997), Distant Music (1999), Frankel (2010)
- Racing Post Trophy – Alphabatim (1983), Bakharoff (1985), Armiger (1992), American Post (2003)
- Middle Park Stakes – Known Fact (1979), Oasis Dream (2002)
- Cheveley Park Stakes – Prophecy (1993), Special Duty (2009)
- Fillies' Mile – Reams of Verse (1996)
- Diadem Stakes – Dowsing (1987)

(Republic of Ireland) Ireland

- Irish 2,000 Guineas – Kingman (2014), Siskin (2020), Field Of Gold (2025)
- Irish Oaks – Wemyss Bight (1993), Bolas (1994), Enable (2017)
- Irish Derby – Commander in Chief (1993), Westover (2022)
- Tattersalls Gold Cup – Noble Mission (2014)
- Pretty Polly Stakes – Promising Lead (2008)
- Matron Stakes – Emulous (2011), Blue Bolt (2026)
- Phoenix Stakes – Digamist (1987)

France

- Prix de l'Arc de Triomphe – Rainbow Quest (1985), Dancing Brave (1986), Rail Link (2006), Workforce (2010), Enable (2017, 2018)
- Prix du Jockey Club – Sanglamore (1990), New Bay (2015)
- Prix de Diane – Jolypha (1992), Nebraska Tornado (2003)
- Poule d'Essai des Poulains – American Post (2004)
- Poule d'Essai des Pouliches – Houseproud (1990), Zenda (2002), Special Duty (2010)
- Grand Prix de Paris – Beat Hollow (2000), Rail Link (2006), Zambezi Sun (2007), Flintshire (2013)
- Prix Jean Prat – Mutual Trust (2011)
- Prix d'Astarté / Prix Rothschild – Nashmeel (1987), Blue Bolt (2026)
- Prix d'Ispahan – Sanglamore (1991), Observatory (2001)
- Grand Prix de Saint-Cloud – Spanish Moon (2009), Noble Mission (2014) Westover (2023)
- Prix Jacques Le Marois – Banks Hill (2002), Kingman (2014)
- Prix du Moulin de Longchamp – Rousillon (1985), All At Sea (1992), Nebraska Tornado (2003)
- Prix du Cadran – Reefscape (2005)
- Prix Royal-Oak – Raintrap (1993), Sunshack (1995), Ice Breeze (2017)
- Prix Vermeille – Jolypha (1992), Midday (2010)
- Prix Maurice de Gheest – Interval (1987)
- Prix de la Forêt – Etoile Montante (2003)
- Prix Morny – Zafonic (1992)
- Prix Jean-Luc Lagardère – Tenby (1992), American Post (2003), Full Mast (2014)
- Critérium de Saint-Cloud – Miserdan (1988), Sunshack (1993), Passage of Time (2006) Epicuris (2014)
- Prix Marcel Boussac – Ryafan (1996), Proportional (2008)
- Prix Jean Romanet – Announce (2011), Romantica (2013)

United States

- Breeders' Cup Classic – Arrogate (2016)
- Breeders' Cup Turf – Enable (2018)
- Breeders' Cup Mile – Expert Eye (2018)
- Breeders' Cup Filly & Mare Turf – Banks Hill (2001), Intercontinental (2005), Midday (2009)
- Breeders' Cup Filly & Mare Sprint – 2nd Ventura (2008)
- Pegasus World Cup – Arrogate (2017)
- Woodford Reserve Turf Classic – Beat Hollow (2002)
- Manhattan Handicap – Beat Hollow (2002), Cacique (2006), Flintshire (2016)
- Charles Whittingham Memorial Handicap – Exbourne (1991), Quest For Fame (1992), Midships (2009)
- United Nations Stakes – Exbourne (1991), Senure (2001)
- Man o' War Stakes – Defensive Play (1990), Cacique (2006)
- Hollywood Gold Cup – Marquetry (1991), Aptitude (2001)
- Eddie Read Handicap – Marquetry (1992), Expelled (1997)
- Arlington Million – Chester House (2000), Beat Hollow (2002)
- Pacific Classic Stakes – Tinners Way (1994), Tinners Way (1995), Skimming (2000), Skimming (2001)
- Jockey Club Gold Cup – Aptitude (2001)
- Clement L. Hirsch Turf Championship Stakes – Senure (2001)
- Shadwell Turf Mile Stakes – Kirkwall (1999)
- Hollywood Turf Cup Stakes – Alphabatim (1984), Alphabatim (1986), Champs Elysees (2008)
- Belmont Stakes – Empire Maker (2003)
- Florida Derby – Empire Maker (2003)
- Wood Memorial Stakes – Empire Maker (2003)
- Jim Dandy Stakes – 2nd Empire Maker (2003)
- Secretariat Stakes – Chiselling (2002)
- Beldame Stakes – Sightseek (2003), Sightseek (2004)
- Gamely Stakes – Tates Creek (2003)
- Humana Distaff Handicap – Sightseek (2003), Paulassilverlining (2017)
- Just A Game Handicap – Intercontinental (2004), Ventura (2008), Proviso (2010), Antonoe (2017)
- Diana Handicap – Tates Creek (2002), Proviso (2010)
- Frank E. Kilroe Mile Handicap – Tychonic (1996), Decarchy (2002) Proviso (2010)
- Beverly D. Stakes – Heat Haze (2003)
- Cotillion Handicap – Close Hatches (2013)
- Yellow Ribbon Stakes – Super Staff (1992), Ryafan (1997), Spanish Fern (1999), Tates Creek (2003), Light Jig (2004)
- Rodeo Drive Stakes – Emollient (2014)
- Flower Bowl Invitational Stakes – Yashmak (1997)
- First Lady Stakes – Intercontinental (2005), Proviso (2010)
- Matriarch Stakes – Wandesta (1996), Ryafan (1997), Heat Haze (2003), Intercontinental (2004), Price Tag (2006), Ventura (2009)
- Kentucky Derby – Mandaloun (2021)
- Kentucky Oaks – Flute (2001)
- Alabama Stakes – Flute (2001)
- Queen Elizabeth II Challenge Cup Stakes – Ryafan (1997)
- Hollywood Derby – Seek Again (2013)
- Sword Dancer Invitational Handicap – Flintshire (2015), Flintshire (2016)
- Travers Stakes – Arrogate (2016)
- Apple Blossom Handicap – Close Hatches (2014)
- Ogden Phipps Handicap – Sightseek (2003), Sightseek (2004), Close Hatches (2014)
- Ashland Stakes – Emollient (2013)
- American Oaks – Emollient (2013)
- Personal Ensign Stakes – Close Hatches (2014)
- Juddmonte Spinster Stakes – Emollient (2013)
- Mother Goose Stakes – Close Hatches (2013)
- San Antonio Handicap – Hatim (1986)
- Vinery Madison Stakes – Paulassliverlining (2017)

Canada

- Canadian International Stakes – French Glory (1990), Raintrap (1994), Champs Elysees (2009)
- Northern Dancer Breeders' Cup Turf – Champs Elysees (2008), Redwood (2010)
- Woodbine Mile – Ventura (2009)

Hong Kong

- Hong Kong Mile – 2nd Cityscape (2011)
- Hong Kong Vase – Flintshire (2014)

United Arab Emirates

- Dubai Duty Free – Cityscape (2012)
- Dubai Sheema Classic – Polish Summer (2004)
- Dubai World Cup – Arrogate (2017)
