= Exogenous (horse) =

American thoroughbred racehorse

- Sire: Unbridled
- Grandsire: Fappiano
- Dam: Tangled Up In Blue
- Damsire: Phone Trick
- Sex: Filly
- Foaled: 1998
- Died: 2001
- Country: USA
- Colour: Gray
- Breeder: Centaur Farms, Inc.
- Owner: Centaur Farms, Inc.
- Trainer: Flint S. Schulhofer
- Jockey: Javier Castellano
- Record: 12:5-4-1
- Earnings: $945,560

Major wins
- Gazelle Handicap (2001); Beldame Stakes (2001)
- Last updated on November 2, 2019

Exogenous (April 12, 1998 – November 2, 2001) was an American Thoroughbred racehorse and the winner of the 2001 Beldame Stakes.

== Career ==
Bred and raced by Vernon Heath's Centaur Farms, Inc., Exogenous' made her racing debut on July 15, 2000, at Belmont Park where she came in fourth place. She did not win her first race until her fifth start on November 18, 2000. She then won two races at Belmont Park in early summer 2001, before she started competing in stakes and graded races.

Exogenous ran third in the June 30, 2001, Mother Goose Stakes and then placed second in both the 2001 Coaching Club American Oaks and the 2001 Alabama Stakes. The last two races of her career were both wins, coming in the September 8, 2001, Gazelle Handicap and then the Beldame Stakes.

Scheduled to compete in the October 27, 2001 Breeders' Cup Distaff at Belmont Park, Exogenous suffered a skull fracture after she flipped onto her back while leaving the paddock before the start of the race. Initially it was thought she would heal and likely race again but her condition worsened during the week. When she could no longer stand up, the decision was made to humanely euthanize her.

== Pedigree ==
Pedigree of Exogenous (USA), 1998
Sire Unbridled (USA) 1987	Fappiano (USA); 1977	Mr. Prospector	Raise a Native
Sire Unbridled (USA) 1987	Fappiano (USA); 1977	Mr. Prospector	Gold Digger
Sire Unbridled (USA) 1987	Fappiano (USA); 1977	Killaloe	Dr. Fager
Sire Unbridled (USA) 1987	Fappiano (USA); 1977	Killaloe	Grand Splendor
Sire Unbridled (USA) 1987	Gana Facil (USA); 1981	Le Fabuleux	Wild Risk
Sire Unbridled (USA) 1987	Gana Facil (USA); 1981	Le Fabuleux	Anguar
Sire Unbridled (USA) 1987	Gana Facil (USA); 1981	Charedi	In Reality
Sire Unbridled (USA) 1987	Gana Facil (USA); 1981	Charedi	Magic
Dam Tangled Up In Blue (USA) 1989	Phone Trick (USA); 1982	Clever Trick	Icecapade
Dam Tangled Up In Blue (USA) 1989	Phone Trick (USA); 1982	Clever Trick	Kankakee Miss
Dam Tangled Up In Blue (USA) 1989	Phone Trick (USA); 1982	Over The Phone	Finnegan
Dam Tangled Up In Blue (USA) 1989	Phone Trick (USA); 1982	Over The Phone	Prattle
Dam Tangled Up In Blue (USA) 1989	Count On Kathy (USA); 1978	Dancing Count	Northern Dancer
Dam Tangled Up In Blue (USA) 1989	Count On Kathy (USA); 1978	Dancing Count	Snow Court
Dam Tangled Up In Blue (USA) 1989	Count On Kathy (USA); 1978	War Exchange	Wise Exchange
Dam Tangled Up In Blue (USA) 1989	Count On Kathy (USA); 1978	War Exchange	Jungle War
