= Sixties Icon =

British-bred Thoroughbred racehorse

- Sire: Galileo
- Grandsire: Sadler's Wells
- Dam: Love Divine
- Damsire: Diesis
- Sex: Stallion
- Foaled: 16 February 2003
- Country: United Kingdom
- Colour: Bay
- Breeder: Lordship Stud
- Owner: Susan Roy
- Trainer: Jeremy Noseda
- Record: 17: 8-1-1
- Earnings: £533,336

Major wins
- Gordon Stakes (2006); St. Leger Stakes (2006); Jockey Club Stakes (2007); Glorious Stakes (2008); Geoffrey Freer Stakes (2008); Cumberland Lodge Stakes (2008)

Sixties Icon (foaled 14 February 2003), is a retired British Thoroughbred racehorse and active sire. In a career which lasted from April 2006 until November 2008, he ran seventeen times and won eight races. He recorded his most important victory when winning the Classic St. Leger Stakes as a three-year-old. He won five other Group Races before being retired to stud.

== Background ==
Sixties Icon is a bay horse bred by the Newmarket-based Lordship Stud. He is exceptionally well-bred, being sired by the 2001 Epsom Derby winner Galileo out of the 2000 Epsom Oaks winner Love Divine. In October 2004, Sixties Icon was sent as a yearling to the Tattersalls sales at Newmarket, where he was bought for 230,000 guineas by John Warren Bloodstock. The colt was sent into training with Jeremy Noseda at Newmarket.

== Racing career ==
=== 2006: three-year-old season ===
Sixties Icon began his racing career by finishing sixth of the twelve runners in maiden race at Newmarket in April 2006. Three weeks late he started 6/4 favourite for a similar event at Windsor and won by three-quarters of a length from Fleeting Memory.

Sixties Icon was then sent to Epsom to contest the Epsom Derby. Starting a 66/1 outsider he stayed on in the closing stages to finish seventh, five and a half lengths behind Sir Percy. Later in June he finished third to Papal Bull in the King Edward VII Stakes at Royal Ascot. In August, Sixties Icon recorded his first Group Race win in the Gordon Stakes at Goodwood. Ridden by Frankie Dettori he was settled in fourth place before taking the lead in the straight and winning by one and three quarter lengths from Jadalee.

Sixties Icon started 11/8 favourite for the 2006 St Leger Stakes which was run at York as Doncaster Racecourse was being redeveloped. Dettori restrained the colt at the back of the eleven runner field before moving up to take the lead in the final furlong. He produced a "powerful late burst" and went clear to win by two and a half lengths from the 50/1 outsider The Last Drop with Red Rocks a length further back in third. Noseda was unable to attend the race as he was viewing yearlings in Kentucky, but described himself as being "absolutely delighted, over the moon" at the result. On his final start of the year, Sixties Icon finished seventh of the eight runners in the Prix de l'Arc de Triomphe.

=== 2007: four-year-old season ===
Sixties Icon made his four-year-old debut in the Jockey Club Stakes at Newmarket on 6 May. Dettori took the colt into the lead two furlongs from the finish and he "stayed on strongly" to win by three lengths from Admiral's Cruise, with Papal Bull in fourth. Sixties Icon started 11/8 favourite for the Coronation Cup at Epsom in June but weakened badly in the closing stages and finished last of the seven runners behind Scorpion. He started favourite again in the Princess of Wales's Stakes at Newmarket in July but finished tenth of the twelve runners behind Papal Bull.

=== 2008: five-year-old season ===
Sixties Icon returned after a break of almost ten months to finish second to Getaway in the Jockey Club Stakes. Later in may, the horse was dropped in class for the Listed Festival Stakes at Goodwood and won by five lengths at odds of 8/13. Sixties Icon was moved back up to Group One class for the Prince of Wales's Stakes at Royal Ascot in June, but finished last of the twelve runners behind Duke of Marmalade.

Sixties Icon won his next three races. On 1 August he "stayed on well" in the closing stages to win the Group Three Glorious Stakes at Goodwood in what was described as a "triumphant return to form". Two weeks later he justified his position as favourite for the Geoffrey Freer Stakes at Newbury, getting up in the "last stride" to beat Tempelstern. His jockey, Johnny Murtagh called Sixties Icon "a class horse" after his win while Noseda described him as "a tough, honest horse". In September he went clear in the closing stages of the Cumberland Lodge Stakes at Ascot and won by two and a quarter lengths from Sugar Ray.

In October, Sixties Icon was sent to California to contest the Breeders' Cup Marathon at Santa Anita Park. He was made 11/8 favourite, but finished fifth, beaten two and three quarter lengths by Muhannak. On his final appearance, Sixties Icon finished thirteenth of the seventeen runners in the Japan Cup where he appeared to be unsuited by the hard ground. He was then retired to stud.

== Stud career ==
Sixties Icon retired to stand as a breeding stallion at the Norman Court Stud at West Tytherley, near Salisbury in Wiltshire. His first foals began racing in 2012. He currently stands at a stud fee of £4,500. His first winner was the filly Vanessa, who won a race at Musselburgh Racecourse in April 2012, and Chilworth Icon gave his sire a first Group race win when taking the Premio Primi Passi three months later.

In 2012, Sixties Icon began shuttling to Argentina to stand stud at Haras La Pasion. In his first year there, he sired Sixties Song, winner of the Gran Premio Carlos Pellegrini and Gran Premio Latinoamericano.

== Pedigree ==
Pedigree of Sixties Icon (GB), bay stallion, 2003
Sire Galileo (IRE) 1998	Sadler's Wells; 1981	Northern Dancer	Nearctic
Sire Galileo (IRE) 1998	Sadler's Wells; 1981	Northern Dancer	Natalma
Sire Galileo (IRE) 1998	Sadler's Wells; 1981	Fairy Bridge	Bold Reason
Sire Galileo (IRE) 1998	Sadler's Wells; 1981	Fairy Bridge	Special
Sire Galileo (IRE) 1998	Urban Sea; 1989	Miswaki	Mr. Prospector
Sire Galileo (IRE) 1998	Urban Sea; 1989	Miswaki	Hopespringeternal
Sire Galileo (IRE) 1998	Urban Sea; 1989	Allegretta	Lombard
Sire Galileo (IRE) 1998	Urban Sea; 1989	Allegretta	Anatevka
Dam Love Divine (GB) 1997	Diesis; 1980	Sharpen Up	Atan
Dam Love Divine (GB) 1997	Diesis; 1980	Sharpen Up	Rocchetta
Dam Love Divine (GB) 1997	Diesis; 1980	Doubly Sure	Reliance
Dam Love Divine (GB) 1997	Diesis; 1980	Doubly Sure	Soft Angels
Dam Love Divine (GB) 1997	La Sky; 1988	Law Society	Alleged
Dam Love Divine (GB) 1997	La Sky; 1988	Law Society	Bold Bikini
Dam Love Divine (GB) 1997	La Sky; 1988	Maryinsky	Northern Dancer
Dam Love Divine (GB) 1997	La Sky; 1988	Maryinsky	Extra Place (Family: 14-c)
