= William Farish =

William Farish may refer to:

- William Farish (chemist) (1759–1837), tutor at the University of Cambridge
- William Stamps Farish I (1843–1899)
- William Stamps Farish II (1881–1942), Standard Oil president
- William Stamps Farish III (born 1939), American businessman
- William S. Farish IV (born c. 1963), American businessman
- William G. Farish, American politician in the Virginia House of Delegates
