= Xəsili =

- Municipality
- Location within Azerbaijan Location within Karabakh Economic Region
- Coordinates: 40°15′06″N 47°15′13″E
- Country: Azerbaijan
- Rayon: Barda

Population
  - Total: 1,337
- Time zone: UTC+4 (AZT)
  - Summer (DST): UTC+5 (AZT)

Xəsili (also, Häsili, Khasili, and Khasyly) is a village and municipality in the Barda Rayon of Azerbaijan. It has a population of 1,337.
