= Sightseek =

American-bred Thoroughbred racehorse

- Sire: Distant View
- Grandsire: Mr. Prospector
- Dam: Viviana
- Damsire: Nureyev
- Sex: Filly
- Foaled: 1999
- Country: United States
- Color: Chestnut
- Breeder: Juddmonte Farms
- Owner: Juddmonte Farms
- Trainer: Robert J. Frankel
- Record: 20: 12-5-0
- Earnings: US$2,445,216

Major wins
- Raven Run Stakes (2002); Top Flight Handicap (2002); Beldame Handicap (2003, 2004); Go For Wand Handicap (2003); Humana Distaff Handicap (2003); Ogden Phipps Handicap (2003, 2004); Rampart Handicap (2004); Ruffian Handicap (2004)

Sightseek (foaled 1999 in Kentucky) is a retired American Thoroughbred racehorse and current broodmare. She was bred and raced by Khalid Abdullah's Juddmonte Farms and was trained by Hall of Fame inductee Robert Frankel.

== Background ==
Sightseek is a full-sister to Quest to Peak, who produced Special Duty, the 2009 European Champion Two-year-old Filly whose wins included the 2010 1000 Guineas Stakes in England and that race's counterpart in France, the Poule d'Essai des Pouliches. 2010, 2010. Their sire was Distant View, a product of Juddmonte's international breeding program. Distant View was a son of the very influential stallion Mr. Prospector, the Leading sire in North America in 1987 and 1988 plus the Leading broodmare sire in North America nine times. Distant View's dam was Seven Springs who won the Prix Robert Papin and the Prix Morny in 1984.

Sightseek's dam was Viviana, a winner of two Listed races. She was the daughter of Nureyev, the 1987 Leading sire in France and the 1997 Leading broodmare sire in Great Britain and Ireland. Nureyev was the son of the legendary supersire Northern Dancer who the New York Times called "the dominant progenitor of his breed" as a sire of sires. Viviana's dam was Nijinsky Star, an unraced daughter of the great Nijinsky, also a son of Northern Dancer. Nijinsky was the 1970 English Triple Crown winner and British Horse of the Year. In addition, at stud he would become the 1986 Leading sire in Great Britain and Ireland and Leading broodmare sire in North America in 1993 and 1994. Nijinsky Star's dam was Chris Evert who also won a Triple Crown. In 1974 she captured the American Triple Tiara of Thoroughbred Racing for fillies and was voted that year's American Champion Three-Year-Old Filly. In 1988 Chris Evert was inducted into the U.S. Racing Hall of Fame.

== Racing career ==
As a yearling in 2000, Sightseek was sent to her owner's stud farm in Ireland to begin her race conditioning. She showed such promise that the following year the decision was made to send her back to the United States. There, she would be turned over to Juddmonte's trainer Robert Frankel.

=== 2002: three-year-old season ===
Sightseek made her racing debut at age three a winning one in a July 28, 2002 race for maidens at New York's Saratoga Race Course. In all, Sightseek made five starts as a three-year-old, winning four of them and finishing second in the other. Her final two wins of 2002 came in the Grade 3 Raven Run Stakes at Kentucky's Keeneland Race Course after which she was taken back to New York where on November 29 she won the Grade 2 Top Flight Handicap at Aqueduct.

=== 2003: four-year-old season ===
Four-year-old Sightseek's 2003 campaign began at California's Santa Anita Park where she would finish second in three straight top level events for older female horses. Beginning in January, 2003 Sightseek ran second behind Affluent in the G1 Santa Monica Handicap then second to Got Koko in February's G2 La Cañada Stakes and in March she was again the runner-up, this time to Starrer in the G1 Santa Margarita Invitational Handicap. Sent to Churchill Downs, Sightseek's win in the Humana Distaff Handicap marked not only her first Grade 1 win, but the first of four straight Grade 1's with victories in the ensuing Ogden Phipps Handicap at Belmont Park, the Go For Wand Handicap at Saratoga and the Beldame Stakes back at Belmont Park.

For her next start, and last of the year, Sightseek was taken back to Santa Anita Park for the October 25 running of the Breeders' Cup Distaff. Sent off as the heavy favorite by the betting public with odds at 1-2, Sightseek never fired and finished fourth to Jerry and Joan Amerman's Adoration.

=== 2004: five-year-old season ===
Sightseek's final year of racing in 2004 saw her add three more Grade 1 wins to her résumé. First though, she finished fourth in the January 25 Santa Monica Handicap, on the Santa Anita track where she had never gotten a win. Sent east to Florida's Gulfstream Park she won the Grade 2 Rampart Handicap. Back in New York state, for the second straight year Sightseek won Belmont Park's Ogden Phipps Handicap in which Azeri took the lead and led her by a head thru the half-mile pole when Sightseek pulled away. Azeri would finish the race 11 3/4 lengths behind Sightseek. In her next outing at Saratoga, Sightseek ran second to Azeri by 1 3/4 lengths in the Go For Wand Handicap. Returning to Belmont Park, Sightseek captured the Grade 1 Ruffian Handicap by 11 1/4 lengths. For the second year in a row, in what would be the final race of her career she won the October 9, 2004 Beldame Handicap. After the race, Robert Frankel called Sightseek the best filly he had ever trained.

The 2004 Eclipse Award for American Champion Older Female Horse went to Azeri while the 2004 World Thoroughbred Racehorse Rankings rated the two fillies equal World Champions.

Sightseek was retired to broodmare duty at Juddmonte Farms near Lexington, Kentucky. Of her progeny, Raison d'Etat was her best runner, winning two of twelve starts and earning $134,035.

== Pedigree ==
Pedigree of Sightseek, chestnut colt, March 28, 2015
Sire Distant View	Mr. Prospector	Raise a Native	Native Dancer
Sire Distant View	Mr. Prospector	Raise a Native	Raise You
Sire Distant View	Mr. Prospector	Gold Digger	Nashua
Sire Distant View	Mr. Prospector	Gold Digger	Sequence
Sire Distant View	Seven Springs	Irish River	Riverman
Sire Distant View	Seven Springs	Irish River	Irish Star
Sire Distant View	Seven Springs	La Trinite	Lyphard
Sire Distant View	Seven Springs	La Trinite	Promessa
Dam Viviana	Nureyev	Northern Dancer	Nearctic
Dam Viviana	Nureyev	Northern Dancer	Natalma
Dam Viviana	Nureyev	Special	Forli
Dam Viviana	Nureyev	Special	Thong
Dam Viviana	Nijinsky Star	Nijinsky	Northern Dancer
Dam Viviana	Nijinsky Star	Nijinsky	Flaming Page
Dam Viviana	Nijinsky Star	Chris Evert	Swoon's Son
Dam Viviana	Nijinsky Star	Chris Evert	Miss Carmie (family: 23-b)
