= Distant Music =

American-bred Thoroughbred racehorse

- Sire: Distant View
- Grandsire: Mr. Prospector
- Dam: Musicanti
- Damsire: Nijinsky
- Sex: Stallion
- Foaled: 3 February 1997
- Country: United States
- Colour: Bay
- Breeder: Juddmonte Farms
- Owner: Khalid Abdullah
- Trainer: Barry Hills
- Record: 14: 5-1-1
- Earnings: £336,260

Major wins
- Champagne Stakes (1999); Dewhurst Stakes (1999); Park Stakes (2000); International Stakes (2001)

Awards
- Top-rated British two-year-old (2000)

Distant Music (foaled 3 February 1997) is an American-bred, British-trained Thoroughbred racehorse and sire. Bred and owned by Khalid Abdullah he was trained throughout his racing career in England by Barry Hills. As a two-year-old in 1999 he was unbeaten in three races including the Champagne Stakes and the Dewhurst Stakes and was the top-rated British-trained juvenile of the season. He began 2000 as the favourite for the 2000 Guineas but after losing his unbeaten record in the Greenham Stakes he was well-beaten in the Newmarket classic. Later in the year he won the Park Stakes and finished third in the Champion Stakes. He failed to reproduce his best form as a four-year-old but did add one more important victory in the Goffs International Stakes. He later stood as a breeding stallion in Ireland, Australia, England and Germany but had no success as a sire of major winners.

== Background ==
Distant Music is a bay horse with a white sock on his right hind leg, bred in Kentucky by Juddmonte Farms, the breeding organisation of his owner Khalid Abdullah. The colt was sent to race in Europe and was trained throughout his career by Barry Hills at Lambourn in Berkshire and was ridden in the first half of his racing career by Hills' son Michael.

He was from the first crop of foals sired by Abdulah's stallion Distant View who won the Sussex Stakes in 1994. Distant View's other foals have included Observatory and Sightseek. Distant Music's dam Musicanti raced in France and the United States, winning one of her twelve races. She was a granddaughter of Sister Shannon, an American broodmare who produced Temperence Hill and was also the female-line ancestor of Vanlandingham and Funny Moon (CCA Oaks).

== Racing career ==
=== 1999: two-year-old season ===
Distant Music began his racing career in a maiden race over seven furlongs at Doncaster Racecourse on 28 July in which he started the 8/11 favourite against seven opponents. He started slowly but took the lead approaching the last quarter mile and won "very easily" by four lengths from Eternal Spring with Best of the Bests (later to win the Prix d'Ispahan) in third. The colt was then stepped up in class for the Group Two Champagne Stakes over the same course and distance on 10 September. He was made the 13/8 favourite in a six-runner field with his main rivals appearing to be Ekraar (winner of the Vintage Stakes) and Rossini (Prix Robert Papin). After being restrained by Michael Hills in the early stages he overtook Rossini a furlong and a half from the finish and won in "impressive" style by two and a half lengths. Barry Hills commented "I was very impressed. If anything, he got there a bit too soon, but he has a very good turn of foot... yesterday he had a seedy toe – a corn – on his near-fore and was slightly lame. It was poulticed and I told my vet the horse would only travel if he thought he was 100 per cent. He didn't travel up here until this morning and it was only at half past six that we took the decision to run him".

On his final appearance of the season, Distant Music contested Britain's most prestigious race for two-year-olds, the Group One Dewhurst Stakes over seven furlongs at Newmarket Racecourse on 16 October. He was made the 4/6 favourite ahead of King's Best, a colt who had won the Acomb Stakes on his previous start. The other three runners were the unbeaten Port Vila, and the Aidan O'Brien-trained pair Brahms (third in the Middle Park Stakes) and Zentsov Street. Distant Music was held up by Hills in the early stages as Zentsov Street set the pace from Brahms before moving up and taking the lead approaching the final furlong. He was pushed out by Hills in the closing stages to defeat Brahms by a length. After the race Barry Hills said "He was very impressive when he quickened up at Doncaster on his previous start and he was very impressive at one stage yesterday. He got by them very quickly, but he would have been even better on better ground. I would like to see him in a strongly run race on ground a bit truer than it was at Newmarket. Then we should see a better horse."

During the winter of 1999/2000 Distant Music was the ante-post favourite for the 2000 Guineas.

=== 2000: three-year-old season ===
Distant Music began his second season in the Greenham Stakes (a major trial of the 2000 Guineas) over seven furlongs at Newmarket on 18 April. He recovered from a slow start to the lead inside the final furlong but was caught in the last stride and beaten a head by Barathea Guest. Despite his defeat he started 11/2 second favourite for the 2000 Guineas on 6 May but finished eighth of the twenty-seven runners behind King's Best.

After a break of four months, Distant Music returned in the Group Three Park Stakes at Doncaster on 7 September. He started the 4/1 third favourite behind the four-year-old Swallow Flight, a Listed race winner who had finished third in the Queen Anne Stakes. The other three runners were Barathea Guest, Valentino (runner-up in the St James's Palace Stakes) and Cape Town (third in the Irish 2,000 Guineas). He was held up by Hills in the early stages before beginning to make progress in the last quarter mile. He took the lead 150 yards from the finish and won by a neck from Valentino. Khalid Abdullah's racing manager Teddy Beckett commented "There has been nothing physically wrong with Distant Music, but he just wasn't right and it was a question of giving him as much time as he needed to come back to form. Barry Hills has done a marvellous job with him". On 14 October Distant Music was stepped up in class and distance and started a 20/1 outsider for the Champion Stakes over ten furlongs at Newmarket. After being held-up towards the rear of the fifteen-runner field he stayed on steadily in the closing stages to finish third behind Kalanisi and Montjeu. For his final appearance of 2000, Distant Music was sent to the United States to contest the Breeders' Cup Mile at Churchill Downs on 4 November. Ridden by the American jockey Corey Nakatani he was outpaced from the start and finished tenth of the fourteen runners behind War Chant.

=== 2001: four-year-old season ===
Richard Hughes took over from Michael Hills as Distant Music's regular jockey in 2001. On his seasonal debut he started joint favourite for the Earl of Sefton Stakes over nine furlongs at Newmarket on 18 April and finished fourth of the six runners behind the seven-year-old Right Wing. In July the colt was sent to Ireland for the Goffs International Stakes over nine furlongs at the Curragh Racecourse and started the 5/4 favourite in a three-runner field. His two opponents were the three-year-old Bonnard (third in the Grand Prix de Paris) and the four-year-old Muakaad (Mooresbridge Stakes). In a change of tactics he led from the start and rallied after being briefly headed by Bonnard two furlongs out. He regained the lead and won "comfortably" by one and a half lengths from Muakaad, being eased down by Hughes in the final strides.

Distant Music failed to win or place in his four remaining races. He finished fifth to Noverre in the Sussex Stakes and fifth again behind Sakhee in the International Stakes at York. In September he attempted to repeat his 2000 victory in the Park Stakes but finished sixth of the eight runners behind Tough Speed. On his final start he was reunited with Michael Hills for the Champion Stakes and finished sixth of the twelve runners behind Nayef.

== Assessment ==
When the International Classification for two-year-olds in 1999 was issued in January 2000, Distant Music was rated the best British-trained colt, five pounds behind the Irish champion Fasliyev and level with Giant's Causeway.

Michael Hills described Distant Music as "the best two-year-old I've ridden".

== Stud record ==
After his retirement from racing, Distant Music became a breeding stallion at the Morristown Lattin Stud in County Kildare. He also stood at the Yallambee Stud in Victoria, Australia before being transferred to the Hedgeholme Stud in County Durham in 2007. He was subsequently moved to Germany where he was based at the Gestut Helenenhof. He sired numerous minor winners but none of any major significance. The best of his offspring was probably Barongo, who won four races in France.

== Pedigree ==
Pedigree of Distant Music, bay stallion, 1997
Sire Distant View (USA) 1991	Mr. Prospector (USA); 1970	Raise a Native	Native Dancer
Sire Distant View (USA) 1991	Mr. Prospector (USA); 1970	Raise a Native	Raise You
Sire Distant View (USA) 1991	Mr. Prospector (USA); 1970	Gold Digger	Nashua
Sire Distant View (USA) 1991	Mr. Prospector (USA); 1970	Gold Digger	Sequence
Sire Distant View (USA) 1991	Seven Springs (USA); 1982	Irish River	Riverman
Sire Distant View (USA) 1991	Seven Springs (USA); 1982	Irish River	Irish Star
Sire Distant View (USA) 1991	Seven Springs (USA); 1982	La Trinite	Lyphard
Sire Distant View (USA) 1991	Seven Springs (USA); 1982	La Trinite	Promessa
Dam Musicanti (USA) 1991	Nijinsky (CAN); 1967	Northern Dancer	Nearctic
Dam Musicanti (USA) 1991	Nijinsky (CAN); 1967	Northern Dancer	Natalma
Dam Musicanti (USA) 1991	Nijinsky (CAN); 1967	Flaming Page	Bull Page
Dam Musicanti (USA) 1991	Nijinsky (CAN); 1967	Flaming Page	Flaring Top
Dam Musicanti (USA) 1991	Populi (USA); 1975	Star Envoy	Pia Star
Dam Musicanti (USA) 1991	Populi (USA); 1975	Star Envoy	Spy Demon
Dam Musicanti (USA) 1991	Populi (USA); 1975	Sister Shannon	Etonian
Dam Musicanti (USA) 1991	Populi (USA); 1975	Sister Shannon	Idaliza (Family: 4-f)
