= Observatory (horse) =

American-bred Thoroughbred racehorse

- Sire: Distant View
- Grandsire: Mr Prospector
- Dam: Stellaria
- Damsire: Roberto
- Sex: Stallion
- Foaled: 17 February 1997
- Country: United States
- Colour: Chestnut
- Breeder: Juddmonte Farms
- Owner: Khalid Abdulla
- Trainer: John Gosden
- Record: 10: 6-2-0
- Earnings: £369,145

Major wins
- Jersey Stakes (2000); Lennox Stakes (2000); Queen Elizabeth II Stakes (2000); Prix d'Ispahan (2001)

Observatory (17 February 1997 – 12 December 2019) was a thoroughbred race horse. He won the Queen Elizabeth II Stakes at Ascot, and the Prix d'Ispahan in France.

== Background ==
Observatory was a chestnut horse bred in Kentucky by Juddmonte Farms, the breeding operation of his owner Khalid Abdulla. He was one of the best horses sired by Distant View who won the Sussex Stakes in 1994.

== Racing career ==
=== 1999: two-year-old season ===
Observatory began his racing career by winning a maiden race at Yarmouth Racecourse but when moved up in class he finished last of the four runners in the Mill Reef Stakes. On his final appearance of the year he returned to Yarmouth and won a minor race over six furlongs in October.

=== 2000: three-year-old season ===
Observatory began his second season by finishing second in a Listed race at Newmarket Racecourse on 3 June and was then sent to Royal Ascot for the Group Three Jersey Stakes over seven furlongs. He started at odds of 11/2 in a nineteen-runner field and won by one and a half lengths from Umistim. At Goodwood Racecourse on 4 August he added a win in the Lennox Stakes, beating Three Points by one and half lengths but in the Celebration Mile at the same course later that month he was beaten into second by Medicean.

On 23 September Observatory started a 14/1 outsider for the Group One Queen Elizabeth II Stakes at Ascot. Giant's Causeway started favourite in a field which also included Medicean, Best of the Bests (Prix Guillaume d'Ornano), Indian Lodge (Prix du Moulin) and Crimplene. After placing the colt just behind the leaders, Kevin Darley produced the colt with a sustained run down the centre of the straight to take the lead inside the final furlong and win by half a length from Giant's Causeway.

=== 2001: four-year-old season ===
On his first appearance as a four-year-old, Observatory was sent to France for the Group One Prix d'Ispahan over 1850 metres at Longchamp Racecourse on 20 May. Starting the 11/10 favourite against four opponents he took the lead over 200 metres from the finish and held off a challenge from Hightori to win by a short head. At Royal Ascot in June he finished fourth behind Fantastic Light, Kalanisi and Hightori in the Prince of Wales's Stakes. He did not race again and was retired to stud at the end of the season.

== Stud career ==
Observatory was based for most of his career at the Banstead Manor Stud in Newmarket. The best of his offspring were Twice Over and African Rose. His death was reported on 12 December 2019.

== Pedigree ==
Pedigree of Observatory, chestnut stallion, 1997
Sire Distant View (USA) 1991	Mr Prospector (USA); 1970	Raise A Native	Native Dancer
Sire Distant View (USA) 1991	Mr Prospector (USA); 1970	Raise A Native	Raise You
Sire Distant View (USA) 1991	Mr Prospector (USA); 1970	Gold Digger	Nashua
Sire Distant View (USA) 1991	Mr Prospector (USA); 1970	Gold Digger	Sequence
Sire Distant View (USA) 1991	Seven Springs (USA); 1982	Irish River	Riverman
Sire Distant View (USA) 1991	Seven Springs (USA); 1982	Irish River	Irish Star
Sire Distant View (USA) 1991	Seven Springs (USA); 1982	La Trinite	Lyphard
Sire Distant View (USA) 1991	Seven Springs (USA); 1982	La Trinite	Promessa
Dam Stellaria (USA) 1986	Roberto (USA); 1969	Hail To Reason	Turn-To
Dam Stellaria (USA) 1986	Roberto (USA); 1969	Hail To Reason	Nothirdchance
Dam Stellaria (USA) 1986	Roberto (USA); 1969	Bramalea	Nashua
Dam Stellaria (USA) 1986	Roberto (USA); 1969	Bramalea	Rarelea
Dam Stellaria (USA) 1986	Victoria Star (CAN); 1972	Northern Dancer	Nearctic
Dam Stellaria (USA) 1986	Victoria Star (CAN); 1972	Northern Dancer	Natalma
Dam Stellaria (USA) 1986	Victoria Star (CAN); 1972	Solometeor	Victoria Park
Dam Stellaria (USA) 1986	Victoria Star (CAN); 1972	Solometeor	Solar Display (Family: 4-j)

- Observatory was inbred 4 × 4 to Nashua, meaning that this stallion appears twice in the fourth generation of his pedigree.
