= Distant View =

American-bred Thoroughbred racehorse

- Sire: Mr. Prospector
- Grandsire: Raise a Native
- Dam: Seven Springs
- Damsire: Irish River
- Sex: Stallion
- Foaled: 1991
- Country: United States
- Colour: Chestnut
- Breeder: Juddmonte Farms
- Owner: Khalid Abdullah
- Trainer: Henry Cecil
- Record: 7: 2-2-0
- Earnings: £155,932

Major wins
- Sussex Stakes (1994)

Awards
- Timeform rating 126 (1994)

Distant View (9 May 1991 – 12 June 2018) was an American-bred British-trained Thoroughbred racehorse and sire. He raced only as a three-year-old in 1994 when he won twice and finished second twice in seven races. In the spring of that year he was beaten on his debut but showed promise when finishing fifth in the 2000 Guineas and then won a minor race on his next start. After a narrow defeat in the St James's Palace Stakes he recorded his biggest win when defeating a strong field of milers in the Group One Sussex Stakes at Goodwood Racecourse. He was beaten in his next two races and was retired after being injured in 1995. He had considerable success as a breeding stallion before being retired from stud duty in 2006 and Died on 12 June 2018.

== Background ==
Distant View was a chestnut horse with a white snip and a white sock on his left hind leg, bred in Kentucky by Juddmonte Farms, the breeding organisation of his owner Khalid Abdullah. He stood 15.3 hands high and was described as being "very strong behind the saddle, but with less than perfect forelegs". He was one of numerous important winners sired by the influential American stallion Mr. Prospector. Distant View's dam Seven Springs was a very fast and precocious racemare who won the Prix Robert Papin and the Prix Morny in 1984. She was a half-sister to Regal State, who also won the Prix Morny, and was the dam of the Dubai World Cup winner Pleasantly Perfect.

The colt was sent to Europe where he entered training with Henry Cecil at the Warren Place stable in Newmarket, Suffolk. He was ridden in all but one of his races by Pat Eddery.

== Racing career ==
=== 1994: three-year-old season ===
Distant View made his racecourse debut in a seven furlong maiden race at Newmarket Racecourse on 14 April 1994 and started the 2/1 favourite against sixteen opponents. He took the lead approaching the final quarter mile but was overtaken and beaten one and a half lengths by the Michael Stoute-trained Zilzal Zamaan, with the pair finishing nine lengths clear of the remainder. Despite his defeat, the colt was then moved up sharply in class to contest the 2000 Guineas over the Rowley Mile at the same track two weeks later, and started a 16/1 outsider. Ridden by Willie Ryan, he made steady progress in the closing stages to finish fifth of the twenty-three runners behind Mister Baileys, Grand Lodge, Colonel Collins and State Performer. Four weeks later, on 28 May, Distant View was dropped back in class for a maiden at Kempton Park Racecourse. Starting the 30/100 favourite he took the lead two furlongs out and drew away from his opponents to win "easily" by six lengths.

On his next appearance Distant View moved back to Group One level for the St James's Palace Stakes at Royal Ascot in June. He turned into the straight in seventh place before moving up to take the lead a furlong out but was caught in the final strides and beaten a head by Grand Lodge. At Goodwood Racecourse on 27 July the colt was matched against older horses for the first time in a "vintage renewal" of the Sussex Stakes and started 4/1 second favourite in a nine-runner field. Mister Baileys and Grand Lodge were again in opposition, whilst the other runners included Barathea, Sayyedati, First Trump and Bigstone. Eddery settled the colt in the early stages as Mister Baileys set the pace, and turned into the straight in sixth place. He was switched to the outside to obtain a clear run and began to make rapid progress approaching the final furlong. He overtook Barathea in the closing stages and won by half a length, with a gap of two and a lengths back to Grand Lodge who took third place ahead of Sayyedati and Mister Baileys.

In September, Distant View started 2/1 favourite for the Queen Elizabeth II Stakes against a field which included many of the leading British milers as well as East of the Moon and Ski Paradise (Prix du Moulin) from France. He raced in second place before fading in the straight and finished fifth behind the 66/1 outsider Maroof. On his final appearance, Distant View was sent to the United States to contest the Breeders' Cup Mile at Churchill Downs in November. He never looked likely to win and finished seventh of the fourteen runners, eight and a half lengths behind the winner Barathea.

Distant View remained in training as a four-year-old in 1995 but sustained an injury and did not race. He was retired to stud at the end of the year.

== Stud record ==
Distant View was retired from racing to become a breeding stallion for Juddmonte Farms. He stood at Juddmonte's Kentucky base before being moved to the Banstead Manor Stud in England. He was scheduled to be sent to Argentina after a half-share was sold to the Haras Vacacion but was pensioned from stud duty later that year on veterinary advice.

His best winners included Observatory, Sightseek, Distant Music (Dewhurst Stakes), Distant Way (Premio Presidente della Repubblica), J'Ray (Canadian Stakes), Decarchy (Frank E. Kilroe Mile Handicap), Sailor's Cap (Colonial Turf Cup) and Dr Brendler Leopardstown 2,000 Guineas Trial. Notable horses produced by Distant View mares have included Sole Power, Special Duty, Cityscape (Dubai Turf) and Bated Breath (Temple Stakes).

== Pedigree ==
Pedigree of Distant View (USA), chestnut stallion, 1991
Sire Mr. Prospector (USA) 1970	Raise a Native (USA); 1961	Native Dancer	Polynesian
Sire Mr. Prospector (USA) 1970	Raise a Native (USA); 1961	Native Dancer	Geisha
Sire Mr. Prospector (USA) 1970	Raise a Native (USA); 1961	Raise You	Case Ace
Sire Mr. Prospector (USA) 1970	Raise a Native (USA); 1961	Raise You	Black Queen
Sire Mr. Prospector (USA) 1970	Gold Digger (USA); 1962	Nashua	Lady Glory
Sire Mr. Prospector (USA) 1970	Gold Digger (USA); 1962	Nashua	Nasrullah
Sire Mr. Prospector (USA) 1970	Gold Digger (USA); 1962	Sequence	Count Fleet
Sire Mr. Prospector (USA) 1970	Gold Digger (USA); 1962	Sequence	Miss Dogwood
Dam Seven Springs (USA) 1982	Irish River (FR); 1976	Riverman	Never Bend
Dam Seven Springs (USA) 1982	Irish River (FR); 1976	Riverman	River Lady
Dam Seven Springs (USA) 1982	Irish River (FR); 1976	Irish Star	Klairon
Dam Seven Springs (USA) 1982	Irish River (FR); 1976	Irish Star	Botany Bay
Dam Seven Springs (USA) 1982	La Trinite (FR); 1976	Lyphard	Northern Dancer
Dam Seven Springs (USA) 1982	La Trinite (FR); 1976	Lyphard	Goofed
Dam Seven Springs (USA) 1982	La Trinite (FR); 1976	Promessa	Darius
Dam Seven Springs (USA) 1982	La Trinite (FR); 1976	Promessa	Peseta (Family: 16-a)
