= Prince of Dance =

Irish-bred Thoroughbred racehorse

- Sire: Sadler's Wells
- Grandsire: Northern Dancer
- Dam: Sun Princess
- Damsire: English Prince
- Sex: Stallion
- Foaled: 21 April 1986
- Country: Ireland
- Colour: Bay
- Breeder: Ballymacoll Stud
- Owner: Michael Sobell
- Trainer: Dick Hern; Neil Graham; Dick Hern
- Record: 6: 4-0-0
- Earnings: £129,161

Major wins
- Washington Singer Stakes (1988, disqualified); Champagne Stakes (1988); Dewhurst Stakes (1988); Newmarket Stakes (1989)

Awards
- Timeform rating 128 (1988); Timeform top-rated two-year-old (1988)

Prince of Dance (21 April 1986 – 1989) was an Irish-bred, British-trained Thoroughbred racehorse. As a two-year-old in 1988 he showed outstanding promise and was rated one of the best colts of his generation in Europe, finishing first in all four of his races including the Washington Singer Stakes, Champagne Stakes and Dewhurst Stakes (a dead heat with Scenic). In the following spring he won the Newmarket Stakes but ran badly when third favourite for the 1989 Epsom Derby. He was euthanised later that year after he was found to be suffering from cancer of the spine.

== Background ==
Prince of Dance was a bay horse with a broad white blaze and two white socks bred in Ireland by the Ballymacoll Stud. During his racing career he was owned by Ballymacoll's part-owner Michael Sobell and was trained at West Ilsley in Berkshire by Dick Hern. During the latter part of the 1988 season, when Hern was recovering from hear surgery, the colt was trained by bis assistant Neil Graham. Prince of Dance was ridden in all but one of his races by the Scottish jockey Willie Carson.

Prince of Dance was from the first crop of foals sired by Sadler's Wells, who won the Irish 2,000 Guineas, Eclipse Stakes and Irish Champion Stakes in 1984 went on to be the Champion sire on fourteen occasions. Prince of Dance was the first foal of Sun Princess, an outstanding racemare who won The Oaks, Yorkshire Oaks and St Leger in 1983. Her dam, Sunny Valley, also produced Saddlers' Hall and was the direct female ancestor of Millenary and Conduit. Sun Princess herself went on to produce Ballet Queen who became an influential broodmare in Japan.

== Racing career ==
=== 1988: two-year-old season ===
Prince of Dance made his racecourse debut in the Sandwich Maiden Stakes over seven furlongs at Ascot Racecourse of 23 July. Starting at odds of 5/2 in an eight-runner field he took the lead two furlongs out and won by half a length from Batshoof, a colt who went on to win the Prince of Wales's Stakes. The colt was then moved up in class for the Listed Washington Singer Stakes at Newbury Racecourse on 12 August. Starting the 6/4 favourite he took the lead approaching the final furlong and drew way in the closing stages to win by six lengths from Zalazl. He was subsequently disqualified when it was found that he had been ineligible to run in the race. At the time the Washington Singer Stakes was restricted to horses whose sires had won over a distance of one and a half miles, but Sadler's Wells had never won a race at a distance beyond ten furlongs. Prince of Dance was stepped up in class gain for the Group Two Champagne Stakes at Doncaster Racecourse on 9 September and started the 1/2 favourite ahead of six opponents. The best-fancied of his rivals were the Henry Cecil-trained Shining Steel, Chief's Image (third in the Phoenix Stakes) and Elmayer. After tracking the early leaders he took the lead a furlong and a half from the finish and won by two lengths from Shining Steel with Free Sweater three lengths back in third.

On 14 October Prince of Dance started 6/4 favourite for Britain's most prestigious race for juveniles, the Dewhurst Stakes over seven furlongs at Newmarket Racecourse. His five rivals were Opening Verse, Saratogan (from the Vincent O'Brien stable), Zayyani, Samoan (Bernard Van Cutsem Stakes) and the 33/1 outsider Scenic. Samoan led the field before Scenic went to the front a quarter of a mile out with Prince of Dance moving up smoothly to dispute the lead approaching the final furlong. The race devolved into a struggle between Prince of Dance and Scenic and the two colts crossed the line together with Saratogan just behind in third place. After studying the photo-finish the judge declared a dead heat, making Prince of Dance and Scenic the joint-winners of the Group One contest. Dick Hern, who was hospitalised at the time later watched video replay of the race and said "That horse is carrying its tail slightly to one side, has it always done that? You need to get that checked out." Marcus Tregoning who was an assistant to Hern believed that his mentor had spotted the first sign of the spinal problem that led to the horse's death a year later.

=== 1989: three-year-old season ===
Prince of Dance had been regarded as the stable's leading classic contender, ahead of Al Hareb and Nashwan but had training problems in early spring and bypassed the 2000 Guineas. He began his second season in the Newmarket Stakes over ten furlongs on 5 May in which he carried top weight of 129 pounds and started the 4/6 favourite against three opponents. He got the better of the Barry Hills-trained Observation Post inside the final furlong and won by half a length with the pair finishing well clear of the other two runners.

On 7 June Prince of Dance was one of twelve colts to contest the 210th running of The Derby over one and a half miles and started the 11/2 third choice in the betting behind the 2000 Guineas winner Nashwan and Cacoethes. With Carson opting to ride Nashwan, the ride on Prince of Dance went to the American Steve Cauthen. After making some progress approaching the final turn Prince of Dance faded badly in the straight and finished tenth, more than twenty lengths behind the winner.

Investigations into the horse's condition following his poor run at Epsom revealed that he was suffering from cancer of the spine and he was euthanised in late 1989.

== Assessment ==
In 1988, the independent Timeform organisation gave Prince of Dance a rating of 128, making him their top-rated juvenile alongside Scenic.

== Pedigree ==
Pedigree of Prince of Dance (IRE), bay stallion, 1986
Sire Sadler's Wells (USA) 1981	Northern Dancer (CAN); 1961	Nearctic	Nearco
Sire Sadler's Wells (USA) 1981	Northern Dancer (CAN); 1961	Nearctic	Lady Angela
Sire Sadler's Wells (USA) 1981	Northern Dancer (CAN); 1961	Natalma	Native Dancer
Sire Sadler's Wells (USA) 1981	Northern Dancer (CAN); 1961	Natalma	Almahmoud
Sire Sadler's Wells (USA) 1981	Fairy Bridge (USA); 1975	Bold Reason	Hail To Reason
Sire Sadler's Wells (USA) 1981	Fairy Bridge (USA); 1975	Bold Reason	Lalun
Sire Sadler's Wells (USA) 1981	Fairy Bridge (USA); 1975	Special	Forli
Sire Sadler's Wells (USA) 1981	Fairy Bridge (USA); 1975	Special	Thong
Dam Sun Princess (IRE) 1980	English Prince (IRE); 1971	Petingo	Petition
Dam Sun Princess (IRE) 1980	English Prince (IRE); 1971	Petingo	Alcazar
Dam Sun Princess (IRE) 1980	English Prince (IRE); 1971	English Miss	Bois Roussel
Dam Sun Princess (IRE) 1980	English Prince (IRE); 1971	English Miss	Virelle
Dam Sun Princess (IRE) 1980	Sunny Valley (IRE); 1972	Val de Loir	Vieux Manoir
Dam Sun Princess (IRE) 1980	Sunny Valley (IRE); 1972	Val de Loir	Vali
Dam Sun Princess (IRE) 1980	Sunny Valley (IRE); 1972	Sunland	Charlottesville
Dam Sun Princess (IRE) 1980	Sunny Valley (IRE); 1972	Sunland	Sunny Gulf (Family: 1-l)
