= 1989 in sports =

1989 in sports describes the year's events in world sport.

== Alpine skiing ==
- Alpine Skiing World Cup
  - Men's overall season champion: Marc Girardelli, Luxembourg
  - Women's overall season champion: Vreni Schneider, Switzerland

== American football ==
- Super Bowl XXIII – the San Francisco 49ers (NFC) won 20–16 over the Cincinnati Bengals (AFC)
  - Location: Joe Robbie Stadium
  - Attendance: 75,129
  - MVP: Jerry Rice, WR (San Francisco)
- January 2 - Fiesta Bowl (1988 season):
  - The Notre Dame Fighting Irish won 34-21 over the West Virginia Mountaineers to win the national championship

== Artistic gymnastics ==
- World Artistic Gymnastics Championships –
  - Men's all-around champion: Igor Korobchinsky, USSR
  - Women's all-around champion: Svetlana Boginskaya, USSR
  - Men's team competition champion: USSR
  - Women's team competition champion: USSR

== Australian rules football ==
- Victorian Football League
  - May 6 – Geelong kicks the highest losing score in VFL/AFL history, kicking 25.13 (163) to Hawthorn’s 26.15 (171)
  - June 24 – Essendon kicks the lowest winning score since the 1927 Grand Final, beating Footscray 3.10 (28) to 3.5 (23).
  - Hawthorn wins the 93rd VFL Premiership beating Geelong 21.18 (144) d 21.12 (138)
  - Brownlow Medal awarded to Paul Couch (Geelong)

== Baseball ==
- April 8 – One-handed pitcher Jim Abbott makes his major-league debut with the California Angels, without spending a single day in the minor leagues. He went on to a 12–12 record for the season.
- August 10 – Ten months after undergoing surgery for cancer in his pitching arm, San Francisco Giants pitcher Dave Dravecky returns to the major leagues, winning his comeback 4–3.
- August 15 – Dave Dravecky's comeback bid ends when his pitching arm breaks in the sixth inning of his second start. Two years later, the cancer-stricken arm would be amputated.
- August 24 – Following an investigation that he gambled on baseball, superstar player Pete Rose is banned from baseball for life.
- World Series – Oakland Athletics won 4 games to 0 over the San Francisco Giants in a series that was delayed because of the 1989 Loma Prieta earthquake. The Series MVP was Dave Stewart, Oakland.
- Taiwan Professional Baseball League, officially founded on October 23.

== Basketball ==
- NCAA Men's Basketball Championship –
  - Michigan wins 80–79 over Seton Hall in overtime
- NBA Finals –
  - The Detroit Pistons win 4 games to 0 over the Los Angeles Lakers to win the franchise's first championship.
- National Basketball League (Australia) Finals:
  - North Melbourne Giants defeated the Canberra Cannons 2–1 in the best-of-three final series.

== Boxing ==
- February 11 – In Grenoble, France, Rene Jacquot won a 12-round decision over Donald Curry to win the World Welterweight Championship
- May 29 to June 3 – 28th European Amateur Boxing Championships held in Athens, Greece

== Canadian football ==
- Grey Cup – Saskatchewan Roughriders won 43–40 over the Hamilton Tiger-Cats
- Vanier Cup – Western Ontario Mustangs won 35–10 over the Saskatchewan Huskies

== Cycling ==
- Giro d'Italia won by Laurent Fignon of France
- Tour de France – Greg LeMond of the United States
- UCI Road World Championships – Men's road race – Greg LeMond of the United States

== Dogsled racing ==
- Iditarod Trail Sled Dog Race Champion –
  - Joe Runyan won with lead dogs: Rambo & Ferlin the Husky

== Field hockey ==
- Men's Champions Trophy: Australia
- Women's Champions Trophy: South Korea

== Figure skating ==
- World Figure Skating Championships –
  - Men's champion: Kurt Browning, Canada
  - Ladies’ champion: Midori Ito, Japan
  - Pair skating champions: Ekaterina Gordeeva & Sergei Grinkov, Soviet Union
  - Ice dancing champions: Marina Klimova / Sergei Ponomarenko, Soviet Union

== Gaelic Athletic Association ==
- Camogie
  - All-Ireland Camogie Champion: Kilkenny
  - National Camogie League: Kilkenny
- Gaelic football
  - All-Ireland Senior Football Championship – Cork 0–17 died Mayo 1–11
  - National Football League – Cork 0–15 died Dublin 0–12
- Ladies' Gaelic football
  - All-Ireland Senior Football Champion: Kerry
  - National Football League: Kerry
- Hurling
  - All-Ireland Senior Hurling Championship – Tipperary 4–24 died Antrim 3–9
  - National Hurling League – Galway 2–16 beat Tipperary 4–8

== Golf ==
Men's professional

- Masters Tournament – Nick Faldo
- U.S. Open – Curtis Strange
- British Open – Mark Calcavecchia
- PGA Championship – Payne Stewart
- PGA Tour money leader – Tom Kite – $1,395,278
- Senior PGA Tour money leader – Bob Charles – $725,887
- Ryder Cup – Europe and the United States teams tied 14–14 in team golf.

Men's amateur

- British Amateur – Stephen Dodd
- U.S. Amateur – Chris Patton
- European Amateur – David Ecob

Women's professional

- Nabisco Dinah Shore – Juli Inkster
- LPGA Championship – Nancy Lopez
- U.S. Women's Open – Betsy King
- Classique du Maurier – Tammie Green
- LPGA Tour money leader – Betsy King – $654,132

== Harness racing ==
- North America Cup – Goalie Jeff
- United States Pacing Triple Crown races –
  1. Cane Pace – Dancing Master
  2. Little Brown Jug – Goalie Jeff
  3. Messenger Stakes – Sandman Hanover
- United States Trotting Triple Crown races –
  1. Hambletonian – Park Ave Joe & Probe (dead heat)
  2. Yonkers Trot – Valley Victory
  3. Kentucky Futurity – Peace Corps
- Australian Inter Dominion Harness Racing Championship –
  - Pacers: Jodie's Babe
  - Trotters: Yankee Loch

== Horse racing ==
Steeplechases

- Cheltenham Gold Cup – Desert Orchid
- Grand National – Little Polveir

Flat races

- Australia – Melbourne Cup won by Tawrrific
- Canadian Triple Crown Races:
  1. Queen's Plate – With Approval
  2. Prince of Wales Stakes – With Approval
  3. Breeders' Stakes – With Approval
  - With Approval becomes the first horse to win the Canadian Triple Crown since 1963.
- France – Prix de l'Arc de Triomphe won by Carroll House
- Ireland – Irish Derby Stakes won by Old Vic
- Japan – Japan Cup won by Horlicks
- English Triple Crown Races:
  1. 2,000 Guineas Stakes – Nashwan
  2. The Derby – Nashwan
  3. St. Leger Stakes – Michelozzo
- United States Triple Crown Races:
  1. May 6 – Kentucky Derby – Sunday Silence
  2. Preakness Stakes – Sunday Silence
  3. Belmont Stakes – Easy Goer
- Breeders' Cup World Thoroughbred Championships:
  1. Breeders' Cup Classic – Sunday Silence
  2. Breeders' Cup Distaff – Bayakoa
  3. Breeders' Cup Juvenile – Rhythm
  4. Breeders' Cup Juvenile Fillies – Go for Wand
  5. Breeders' Cup Mile – Steinlen
  6. Breeders' Cup Sprint – Dancing Spree
  7. Breeders' Cup Turf – Prized

== Ice hockey ==
- Art Ross Trophy as the NHL's leading scorer during the regular season: Mario Lemieux, Pittsburgh Penguins
- March 22 – St. Louis Blues’ Steve Tuttle slits the jugular vein of Buffalo Sabres’ goaltender Clint Malarchuk, with a total of 300 stitches needed to close the wound thanks to trainer Jim Pizzutelli.
- Hart Memorial Trophy for the NHL’s Most Valuable Player: Wayne Gretzky, Los Angeles Kings
- Stanley Cup – The Calgary Flames won 4 games to 2 over the Montreal Canadiens. This constitutes the only time that the visiting team won the cup at the Montreal Forum against the Canadiens.
- World Hockey Championship
  - Men's champion: Soviet Union defeated Canada
  - Junior Men's champion: Soviet Union defeated Sweden

== Lacrosse ==
- The Philadelphia Wings defeat the New York Saints to win the Major Indoor Lacrosse League championship

== Radiosport ==
- Second European High Speed Telegraphy Championship held in Hanover, Germany.

== Rugby league ==
- 1989 Kangaroo tour of New Zealand
- June 7 – 1989 Panasonic Cup tournament final: Brisbane Broncos 22–20 Illawarra Steelers at Parramatta Stadium
- June 14 – 1989 State of Origin title is wrapped up by Queensland in Game Two of the three-match series against New South Wales at the Sydney Football Stadium before 40,000.
- July 23 – first of the 1989–1992 World Cup's twenty tournament matches is won by Australia 22–14 over New Zealand at Mount Smart Stadium before 15,000
- September 24 – 1989 NSWRL season Grand Final: Canberra Raiders 19–14 Balmain Tigers at Sydney Football Stadium before 40,500.
- October 4 – 1989 World Club Challenge match is won by Widnes who defeats Canberra Raiders 30–18 at Old Trafford before 30,768

== Rugby union ==
- 95th Five Nations Championship series is won by France

== Snooker ==
- World Snooker Championship – Steve Davis beats John Parrott 18–3
- World rankings – Steve Davis remains world number one for 1989/90

== Swimming ==
- Third Pan Pacific Championships, held in Tokyo, Japan (August 17 – 20)
- August 20 – Tom Jager once again regains the world record (22.14) in the 50m freestyle (long course) during 1989 Pan Pacific Swimming Championships, with a time of 22.12.

== Taekwondo ==
- World Championships held in Seoul, South Korea

== Tennis ==
- Grand Slam in tennis men's results:
  1. Australian Open – Ivan Lendl
  2. French Open – Michael Chang
  3. Wimbledon championships – Boris Becker
  4. U.S. Open – Boris Becker
- Grand Slam in tennis women's results:
  1. Australian Open – Steffi Graf
  2. French Open – Arantxa Sánchez Vicario
  3. Wimbledon championships – Steffi Graf
  4. U.S. Open – Steffi Graf
- Davis Cup – Germany F.R. won 3–2 over Sweden in world tennis.

== Triathlon ==
- 1989 ITU Triathlon World Championships held in Avignon, France
- ETU European Championships held in Cascais, Portugal

== Volleyball ==
- 1989 FIVB Men's World Cup won by Cuba
- 1989 FIVB Women's World Cup won by Cuba
- 1989 Men's European Volleyball Championship won by Italy
- 1989 Women's European Volleyball Championship won by USSR

== Water polo ==
- Men's Water Polo World Cup won by Yugoslavia
- Men's European Water Polo Championship won by West Germany
- Women's European Water Polo Championship won by the Netherlands

== Multi-sport events ==
- Third World Games held in Karlsruhe, West Germany
- 15th Summer Universiade held in Duisburg, West Germany
- Fourteenth Winter Universiade held in Sofia, Bulgaria

== Awards ==
- Associated Press Male Athlete of the Year – Joe Montana, National Football League
- Associated Press Female Athlete of the Year – Steffi Graf, Tennis
- Associated Press Male Athlete of the Decade: Wayne Gretzky, National Hockey League
