= Ile de Chypre =

British Thoroughbred racehorse

- Sire: Ile de Bourbon
- Grandsire: Nijinsky
- Dam: Salamina
- Damsire: Welsh Pageant
- Sex: Stallion
- Foaled: 25 March 1985
- Country: United Kingdom
- Colour: Bay
- Breeder: Athos Christodoulou
- Owner: Athos Christodoulou
- Trainer: Guy Harwood
- Record: 28: 5-8-5
- Earnings: £344,926

Major wins
- Tattersalls Rogers Gold Cup (1989); International Stakes (1989)

Ile de Chypre (25 March 1985 – 2010) was a British Thoroughbred racehorse and sire. After showing some promise as a juvenile he improved to become a leading handicapper in 1988, winning two races and being placed in the Old Newton Cup, Magnet Cup and Cambridgeshire Handicap. He was also involved in a bizarre incident at Royal Ascot in which his unseated his jockey after being allegedly stunned by an "ultrasonic gun". He reached his peak as a four-year-old in 1989 when he won the Tattersalls Rogers Gold Cup in Ireland before recording an upset victory in the International Stakes. In the same year he also finished second in the Coronation Cup and third in the Champion Stakes. He won one minor race in 1990 and returned after a lengthy absence to race six times without success in 1992.

== Background ==
Ile de Chypre was a "strong, rangy, attractive" bay horse with no white markings bred in England by his owner Athos Christodoulou. His sire, Ile de Bourbon, was a top-class middle-distance performer best known for his win in the 1978 King George VI and Queen Elizabeth Stakes. As a breeding stallion he also sired The Derby winner Kahyasi before being exported to Japan. Ile de Chypre's dam Salamina showed some ability as a racehorse, winning three of her nine races in Britain in 1980 and 1981. She was descended from the American broodmare Galaday, making her a distant relative of Galatea and Never Say Die.

Christodoulou sent the colt into training with Guy Harwood at Pulborough in West Sussex. At the time, Harwood was noted for his modern approach to training, introducing Britain to features such as artificial gallops and barn-style stabling.

== Racing career ==
=== 1987: two-year-old season ===
After finishing unplaced over seven furlongs on his racecourse debut, Ile de Chypre finished second to Highbrow in a sixteen-runner maiden race over one mile at Newmarket Racecourse in October. The independent Timeform organisation commented "will be suited by 1¼m+: sure to win a race".

=== 1988: three-year-old season ===
After finishing second in the April Maiden Stakes on his three-year-old debut over one and a half miles, Ile de Chypre was sent to Royal Ascot to contest the King George V Stakes over the same distance on 16 June. He led from the start and looked likely to win before swerving abruptly to the left inside the final furlong and unseating his jockey Greville Starkey. It was later claimed that the horse had been targeted by an "ultrasonic gun" as part of a money laundering operation by a cocaine-smuggling syndicate. In a trial at Southwark Crown Court in 1989 a car dealer named James Laming claimed that he had carried out the operation and that the device had been disguised as a pair of binoculars but was somewhat vague regarding the details.

He continued to compete in major handicap races, finishing second in the Old Newton Cup at Haydock Park and third in the John Smith's Magnet Cup at York before being dropped back in class and recording his first success as he won a maiden race at Newbury Racecourse on 12 August by ten lengths. In September he finished unplaced in the Garrowby Limited Handicap at York and then won sixteen-runner a handicap at Newbury, beating Quinlan Terry by three lengths. On his final appearance o the season he carried top weight of 134 pounds in the Cambridgeshire Handicap on 1 October. He led for most of the way but was caught in the final strides and beaten a neck by Quinlan Terry who was carrying 117 pounds.

=== 1989: four-year-old season ===
Ile de Chypre began his third season by finishing unplaced when carrying top weight in the Lincoln and then ran second under 140 pounds in a handicap at Newmarket. He was then stepped up in class and sent to Ireland to contest the Group Two Tattersalls Rogers Gold Cup at the Curragh on 20 May. Ridden by the Welsh jockey Tony Clark he started at odds of 7/1 behind Executive Perk (Mooresbridge Stakes), Per Quod (runner-up in the Gordon Richards Stakes) and Carroll House. He recorded his biggest win up to that time as he won by three lengths from Executive Perk with Carroll House a length and a half back in third.

At Epsom in June Ile de Chypre was promoted to Group One class for the Coronation Cup and took the lead a furlong out before being overtaken and beaten half a length by the favourite Sheriff's Star. The horse was dropped back in class and distance for the Group Three Scottish Classic over ten furlongs at Ayr Racecourse and was beaten by the three-year-old Scenic. On 22 August Ile de Chypre was ridden by Clark when he was one of seven runners to contest the 18th running of the International Stakes over ten and a half furlongs at York. Cacoethes, also trained by Guy Harwood was made the 2/5 favourite after finishing rthird to Nashwan in The Derby and second to the same horse in the King George VI and Queen Elizabeth Stakes, whilst Ile de Chypre was a relative outsider on 16/1. The other five runners were Two Timing (Prince of Wales's Stakes), Magic Gleam (Child Stakes), Shady Heights, Batshoof and Lapierre (Prix Jean Prat). After tracking the leader Two Timing in the early stages Clark sent Ile de Chypre into the lead three furlongs from the finish and accelerated clear of the field. Cacoethes emerged as his only challenger but Ile de Chypre stayed on strongly to win by one and a half lengths with a gap of four lengths back to Shady Heights in third. On his retirement from race riding in 2004 Clark said "Ile de Chypre was a horse who took a lot of knowing but he was very game and I don't think he got the credit he deserved - he was a great favourite".

After a break of two months, Ile de Chypre returned to the track in the Champion Stakes at Newmarket on 21 October. Ridden by Willie Carson he led for most of the way before being caught in the final strides and finishing third, beaten a head and short head by Legal Case and Dolpour in a three-way photo finish. Ile de Chypre ended his season with a trip to the United States for the Breeders' Cup Turf at Gulfstream Park on 4 November in which he finished unplaced behind Prized.

=== 1990: five-year-old season ===
On his first appearance in 1990, Ile de Chypre finished second by a neck to Dolpour in the Gordon Richards Stakes at Sandown Park Racecourse in April. Four weeks later he was sent to France and finished sixth of the nine runners behind Creator in the Prix d'Ispahan. In the Eclipse Stakes at Sandown in July he led for most of the way before being outpaced in the closing stages and finishing third behind Elmaamul and Terimon. After a break of three months Ile de Chypre returned in a minor race at Warwick Racecourse in October. Starting at odds of 1/6 he won by a length from Riviera Magic.

=== 1992: seven-year-old season ===
Ile de Chypre missed the whole of the 1991 season before returning as a seven-year-old in 1992. In April he finished third in the Magnolia Stakes at Kempton Park Racecourse and then finished unplaced in the Gordon Richards Stakes. In the summer of 1992 he finished fourth in the Scottish Classic and third in a handicap at York. In his last two starts he finished fifth in the September Stakes and unplaced in a handicap at Newbury.

== Stud record ==
Ile de Chypre was retired to stud but attracted little interest from breeders. He sired a few minor winners under National Hunt rules.

== Pedigree ==
Pedigree of Ile de Chypre, bay stallion, 1985
Sire Ile de Bourbon (USA) 1975	Nijinsky (CAN); 1967	Northern Dancer	Nearctic
Sire Ile de Bourbon (USA) 1975	Nijinsky (CAN); 1967	Northern Dancer	Natalma
Sire Ile de Bourbon (USA) 1975	Nijinsky (CAN); 1967	Flaming Page	Bull Page
Sire Ile de Bourbon (USA) 1975	Nijinsky (CAN); 1967	Flaming Page	Flaring Top
Sire Ile de Bourbon (USA) 1975	Roseliere (FR); 1965	Misti	Medium
Sire Ile de Bourbon (USA) 1975	Roseliere (FR); 1965	Misti	Mist
Sire Ile de Bourbon (USA) 1975	Roseliere (FR); 1965	Peace Rose	Fastnet Rock
Sire Ile de Bourbon (USA) 1975	Roseliere (FR); 1965	Peace Rose	La Paix
Dam Salamina (IRE) 1978	Welsh Pageant (FR); 1966	Tudor Melody	Tudor Minstrel
Dam Salamina (IRE) 1978	Welsh Pageant (FR); 1966	Tudor Melody	Matelda
Dam Salamina (IRE) 1978	Welsh Pageant (FR); 1966	Picture Light	Court Martial
Dam Salamina (IRE) 1978	Welsh Pageant (FR); 1966	Picture Light	Queen of Light
Dam Salamina (IRE) 1978	Femme Elite (USA); 1969	Young Emperor	Grey Sovereign
Dam Salamina (IRE) 1978	Femme Elite (USA); 1969	Young Emperor	Young Empress
Dam Salamina (IRE) 1978	Femme Elite (USA); 1969	Fairy Flax	Pensive
Dam Salamina (IRE) 1978	Femme Elite (USA); 1969	Fairy Flax	Confetti (Family 1-n)
