= Scenic (horse) =

Irish-bred Thoroughbred racehorse

- Sire: Sadler's Wells
- Grandsire: Northern Dancer
- Dam: Idyllic
- Damsire: Foolish Pleasure
- Sex: Stallion
- Foaled: 13 April 1986
- Died: 6 March 2005 (aged 18)
- Country: Ireland
- Colour: Bay
- Breeder: Lyonstown Stud
- Owner: Sheikh Mohammed
- Trainer: Barry Hills
- Record: 12: 4-2-1
- Earnings: £156,637

Major wins
- Dewhurst Stakes (1988); Scottish Classic (1989)

Awards
- Timeform rating 128 (1988); Timeform top-rated two-year-old (1988)

Honours
- Scenic Lodge Stud
- Last updated on 30 July 2020

Scenic (13 April 1986 – 6 March 2005) was an Irish-bred, British-trained Thoroughbred racehorse and sire. As a juvenile in 1988 he was beaten on his debut but won his next three races, ending his season by dead-heating with Prince of Dance in the Dewhurst Stakes. As a three-year-old he won the Scottish Classic, as well as finishing third in the St James's Palace Stakes and fourth in the Champion Stakes. He failed to win in three starts in 1990 and was retired to stud at the end of the year. He later became a very successful breeding stallion in Australia.

== Background ==
Scenic was a bay horse with a white blaze and four white socks bred in Ireland by the Lyonstown Stud. He was acquired as a yearling by Sheikh Mohammed. The colt was sent into training in England with Barry Hills at Lambourn in Berkshire and was ridden in all but one of his races by Hills' son Michael.

Scenic was from the first crop of foals sired by Sadler's Wells, who won the Irish 2,000 Guineas, Eclipse Stakes and Irish Champion Stakes in 1984 went on to be the Champion sire on fourteen occasions. Scenic's dam Idyllic was an unraced daughter of the outstanding broodmare Where You Lead, whose other female-line descendants have included Rainbow Quest, Warning and Commander In Chief.

== Racing career ==
=== 1988: two-year-old season ===
Scenic made his first appearance in a six furlong maiden race at Goodwood Racecourse on 29 July in which he was ridden by Paul Cook and finished second, beaten half a length by the Dick Hern-trained Road To Reason. Three weeks later he was moved up in distance and started 8/11 favourite in a sixteen-runner field for a seven furlong maiden at Chester Racecourse. With Michael Hills in the saddle he took the lead approaching the final furlong and won by one and a half lengths from the filly Garth Lady. Twelve days at York Racecourse Scenic contested a seven furlong "graduation" race, for horses with no more than one previous race. Starting 2/1 joint-favourite he tracked the leaders before taking the led in the last quarter mile and won by two lengths from the Guy Harwood-trained Ambuscade.

After a break of six weeks Scenic returned to the track to contest Britain's most prestigious race for juveniles, the Dewhurst Stakes over seven furlongs at Newmarket Racecourse on 14 October and started the 33/1 outsider in a six-runner field. Prince of Dance (winner of the Champagne Stakes) started favourite ahead of Opening Verse, whilst the other three runners were Saratogan (from the Vincent O'Brien stable), Zayyani and Samoan (Bernard Van Cutsem Stakes). Samoan led the field before Scenic went to the front two furlongs out. The race devolved into a struggle between Scenic and Prince of Dance and the two colts crossed the line together with Saratogan just behind in third place. After studying the photo-finish the judge declared a dead heat, making Scenic and Prince of Dance the joint-winners of the Group One contest.

=== 1989: three-year-old season ===
Scenic did not reappear as a three-year-old until June when he contested the St James's Palace Stakes at Royal Ascot in which he finished third of the five runners behind Shaadi and Greensmith. On 15 July, Scenic was matched against Ile de Chypre and High Estate (Royal Lodge Stakes) in the William Hill Classic over ten furlongs at Ayr Racecourse and started the 5/2 outsider of the three runners. After racing in third place he accelerated into the lead a furlong out and won by a length from Ile de Chypre.

In September Scenic was sent to Ireland for the Irish Champion Stakes at Phoenix Park Racecourse and started 5/4 favourite in a nine-runner field. He turned into the straight in sixth place but was unable to make any progress and finished eighth behind Carroll House. On 21 October the colt contested the Champion Stakes at Newmarket Racecourse. He struggled to obtain a clear run in the closing stages and finished fourth behind Legal Case, Dolpour and Ile de Chypre, beaten less than two lengths by the winner. On his final appearance of the season Scenic was sent to the United States and was moved up in distance for the Breeders' Cup Turf over one and a half miles at Gulfstream Park on 4 November. He started a 26/1 outsider and finished unplaced behind Prized.

=== 1990: four-year-old season ===
Scenic began his third season in the Earl of Sefton Stakes at Newmerket on 18 April and finished fourth of the ten runners behind Terimon. In the Brigadier Gerard Stakes at Sandown Park Racecourse on 29 May Scenic finished second behind Husyan. In June at Royal Ascot, Scenic contested his final race and finished last of the eight runners behind Batshoof in the Prince of Wales's Stakes.

== Assessment ==
In 1988, the independent Timeform organisation gave Scenic a rating of 128, making him their top-rated juvenile alongside Prince of Dance.

== Stud record ==
Scenic was retired from racing to become a breeding stallion at Collingrove Stud in Victoria. He was also "shuttled" to Coolmore Stud Ireland before moving permanently to the Durham Lodge Stud in Western Australia. Scenic died of a heart attack whilst galloping in his paddock at Durham Lodge on 6 March 2005. The Durham Lodge spokesman Jeremy Smith said "It all happened so suddenly. All of us over here are pretty much still in shock... Scenic was such a wonderful stallion." The stud farm was later renamed Scenic Lodge Stud in his honour.

=== Notable Progeny ===
Scenic sired 13 individual Group 1 winners:

'c = colt, f = filly, g = gelding

Foaled	Name	Sex	Major wins
1991	Blevic	c	Sires' Produce Stakes, Victoria Derby
1992	Lochrae	c	Sires' Produce Stakes
1992	Shame	f	Sires' Produce Stakes, The Thousand Guineas
1995	Episode	f	Australasian Oaks, South Australian Oaks
1995	Piavonic	f	Manikato Stakes
1996	Lord Essex	g	George Ryder Stakes
1997	Scenic Peak	g	Emirates Stakes
1997	Universal Prince	c	Spring Champion Stakes, Canterbury Guineas, Australian Derby, Ranvet Stakes
2002	Scenic Shot	g	Doomben Cup (twice), Mackinnon Stakes
2003	Universal Queen	f	Robert Sangster Stakes
2003	Viewed	c	Melbourne Cup, Caulfield Cup
2004	Scenic Blast	g	Lightning Stakes, Newmarket Handicap, King's Stand Stakes
2005	Coniston Bluebird	g	New Zealand Derby

== Pedigree ==
Pedigree of Scenic (IRE), bay stallion, 1986
Sire Sadler's Wells (USA) 1981	Northern Dancer (CAN); 1961	Nearctic	Nearco
Sire Sadler's Wells (USA) 1981	Northern Dancer (CAN); 1961	Nearctic	Lady Angela
Sire Sadler's Wells (USA) 1981	Northern Dancer (CAN); 1961	Natalma	Native Dancer
Sire Sadler's Wells (USA) 1981	Northern Dancer (CAN); 1961	Natalma	Almahmoud
Sire Sadler's Wells (USA) 1981	Fairy Bridge (USA); 1975	Bold Reason	Hail To Reason
Sire Sadler's Wells (USA) 1981	Fairy Bridge (USA); 1975	Bold Reason	Lalun
Sire Sadler's Wells (USA) 1981	Fairy Bridge (USA); 1975	Special	Forli
Sire Sadler's Wells (USA) 1981	Fairy Bridge (USA); 1975	Special	Thong
Dam Idyllic (USA) 1982	Foolish Pleasure (USA); 1972	What a Pleasure	Bold Ruler
Dam Idyllic (USA) 1982	Foolish Pleasure (USA); 1972	What a Pleasure	Grey Flight
Dam Idyllic (USA) 1982	Foolish Pleasure (USA); 1972	Fool-Me-Not	Tom Fool
Dam Idyllic (USA) 1982	Foolish Pleasure (USA); 1972	Fool-Me-Not	Cuadrilla
Dam Idyllic (USA) 1982	Where You Lead (USA); 1970	Raise a Native	Native Dancer
Dam Idyllic (USA) 1982	Where You Lead (USA); 1970	Raise a Native	Raise You
Dam Idyllic (USA) 1982	Where You Lead (USA); 1970	Noblesse	Mossborough
Dam Idyllic (USA) 1982	Where You Lead (USA); 1970	Noblesse	Duke's Delight (Family: 14-f)
