= Sun Princess (horse) =

Irish-bred Thoroughbred racehorse (1980–2001)

- Racing colours of Ballymacoll Stud
- Sire: English Prince
- Grandsire: Petingo
- Dam: Sunny Valley
- Damsire: Val de Loir
- Sex: Mare
- Foaled: 18 May 1980
- Country: Ireland
- Colour: Bay
- Breeder: Ballymacoll Stud
- Owner: Michael Sobell
- Trainer: Dick Hern
- Record: 10:3-4-1

Major wins
- Epsom Oaks (1983); Yorkshire Oaks (1983); St. Leger Stakes (1983); Timeform rating: 130
- Last updated on 16 September 2025

Sun Princess (1980–2001) was an Irish-bred, British-trained Thoroughbred racehorse and broodmare. In a career which lasted from September 1982 until October 1984, she ran ten times and won three races. She recorded all her successes at Group One level when a three-year-old in 1983: the Classic Epsom Oaks by a record margin of twelve lengths; the Yorkshire Oaks against other fillies; the St Leger against colts. In the same season she was placed in Europe's two most prestigious all-aged races, finishing third in the King George VI and Queen Elizabeth Stakes and second in the Prix de l'Arc de Triomphe. Sun Princess raced without winning in 1984 before she was retired to stud, where she became the dam of several winners including the Dewhurst Stakes winner Prince of Dance.

== Background ==
Sun Princess, a bay filly with a white blaze, was bred by the Ballymacoll Stud in County Meath, Ireland, and raced in the colours of the stud's part-owner Sir Michael Sobell. Sun Princess's sire, English Prince, won the Irish Derby, but was not a great success as a stallion in Europe and was exported to Japan in 1980. Her dam, Sunny Valley, also bred at Ballymacoll, went on to produce the Coronation Cup winner Saddlers' Hall and was the direct female ancestor of the St Leger winner Millenary and the double Breeders' Cup Turf winner Conduit. Like many of the stud's horses, Sun Princess was sent into training with Major Dick Hern at West Ilsley in Berkshire. She was ridden in most of her races by Hern's stable jockey Willie Carson.

== Racing career ==
=== 1982: two-year-old season ===
As a young horse, Sun Princess was a challenging horse to train as her temperament made her difficult to settle and she had a tendency to bolt during exercise. Like many of Dick Hern's best horses, she was lightly-campaigned as a two-year-old. She ran once, finishing second in the Blue Seal Stakes at Ascot in September.

=== 1983: three-year-old season ===
Sun Princess made her first appearance as a three-year-old in the Sir Charles Clore Memorial Stakes, at Newbury in May, a trial race for the Epsom Oaks. She ran second to Ski Sailing, finishing twenty-five lengths clear of the third horse. After the race, Carson had a private wager with Ski Sailing's jockey, Steve Cauthen, that he would reverse the placings in the Oaks.

At Epsom on 4 June, Sun Princess started at odds of 6/1 for the Oaks, with the French-trained Alexandrie starting favourite. Carson restrained the filly in the early stages before allowing her to make up ground on the outside and sending her into the lead half a mile from the finish. In the straight she increased her lead with every stride to record a "highly impressive victory" by twelve lengths from Acclimatise, with Royal Heroine (Breeders' Cup Mile) and Cormorant Wood (Champion Stakes) among the beaten fillies. The winning margin was the largest ever recorded in the Oaks and the biggest in any British Classic race since Never Say Die won the St Leger by twelve lengths in 1954. Observers including Timeform speculated that Sun Princess might well have won that year's Epsom Derby if she had contested that race. She was the also the first maiden to win a Classic since Asmena won the Oaks in 1950.

Sun Princess bypassed a meeting with the leading Irish filly Give Thanks in the Irish Oaks, being instead sent to Ascot to run against colts and older horses in Britain's most prestigious all-aged race, the King George VI and Queen Elizabeth Stakes. She started 9/4 joint-favourite with the Prix du Jockey Club winner Caerleon, ahead of rivals including Time Charter, Lemhi Gold, Lancastrian (Prix Ganay), Diamond Shoal (Grand Prix de Saint-Cloud) and Awaasif (Yorkshire Oaks). Sun Princess pulled very hard in the early stages as Carson struggled to restrain her. She made steady progress in the straight, but failed to reach the lead and finished third to Time Charter and Diamond Shoal, beaten just under two lengths. A month after her defeat at Ascot, Sun Princess started 6/5 favourite the Yorkshire Oaks, in she was matched against Give Thanks. The Irish filly had won seven of her eight races in 1983, including the Irish Oaks, and was well-supported at 7/4. On this occasion, Sun Princess was allowed to lead from the start and was never in danger of defeat, accelerating clear of her opponents in the straight and running on with "tremendous zest" to win by four lengths from Green Lucia, with Give Thanks a further three lengths back in third.

Following her win at York, Sun Princess again faced mixed-sex competition in the St Leger Stakes at Doncaster on 10 September for which started 11/8 favourite. Her main rivals included the Epsom Derby runner-up Carlingford Castle and the Grand Prix de Paris winner Yawa. The race was run on soft ground which forced the withdrawal of Caerleon and led to doubts about Sun Princess's participation until shortly before the race. The Hern stable entered a pacemaker named Sailor's Dance who led at a moderate gallop before Sun Princess took the lead in the straight. On this occasion she had to be driven out by Carson to win by three-quarters of a length from the French-trained Esprit du Nord, with Carlingford Castle third. It was the second time that Hern had won the Oaks-St Leger double, having been successful with the Queen's filly Dunfermline in 1977. On her final appearance of the season, Sun Princess was sent to Longchamp Racecourse in Paris to contest the Prix de l'Arc de Triomphe. Sailor's Dance once again set the pace before Sun Princess took over before the straight. She held off challenges from Time Charter, Stanerra, and Diamond Shoal but was overtaken fifty metres from the finish by All Along and finished second by a length.

=== 1984: four-year-old season ===
Sun Princess stayed in training as a four-year-old in 1984, but failed to reproduce her three-year-old success. On her seasonal debut she met Time Charter again in the Coronation Cup, but was no match for the older mare and was beaten four lengths. In July she ran in the King George for the second time and finished fifth behind Teenoso. She was off the course until the Arc de Triomphe in October, where she finished unplaced behind Sagace. According to Timeform "the old sparkle had gone".

== Assessment ==
Sun Princess was awarded a rating of 130 by Timeform in 1983 and 120 a year later. In the 1983 International Classification, an official ranking of the best European horses, Sun Princess was rated the equal fifth-best horse in Europe, behind Shareef Dancer, All Along, Habibti and Caerlon. In their book A Century of Champions, John Randall and Tony Morris rated Sun Princess a "superior" Oaks winner and the thirty-second best filly of the twentieth century to have been trained in the United Kingdom or Ireland.

After her death, Carson described her as being a difficult horse, but "possibly the best filly I ever rode", adding that "if she'd learned to relax enough she would have been the best you've ever seen."

== Breeding record ==
Sun Princess was retired to a breeding career at Ballymacoll. She was the dam of at least eight winners, most notably Prince of Dance (by Sadler's Wells) who dead-heated for the 1988 Dewhurst Stakes, also won the Champagne Stakes, Newmarket Stakes and was disqualified after winning the Washington Singer Stakes at Newbury because the colt was not qualified to run. Others included Princely Venture (by Entrepreneur) who won Scottish Derby, Ballet Prince (3rd Prix Gladiateur) and Golden Ball (7th Epsom Derby). Through her daughter Ballet Queen, Sun Princess is the ancestor of the Tokyo Yushun winner Fusaichi Concorde and the Satsuki Sho winners Unrivaled and Victory. Descendants of Sun Princess remain at Ballymacoll through her granddaughter Drama Class (by Caerleon out of Stage Struck by Sadler's Wells). Drama Class has had two black type offspring in Scottish Stage (by Selkirk: 2nd Irish Oaks) and Eleanora Duse (by Azamour), who are both also broodmares at the stud. In contrast to her attitude during her racing career, Sun Princess developed a quiet and docile temperament in retirement: the Ballymacoll stud manager describer her as "a most wonderful character and a very easy mare to deal with. A real lady." Sun Princess died in 2001 after developing a tumour in her sinus and was buried at the Ballymacoll Stud.

- 1986 PRINCE OF DANCE (GB) : Bay colt, foaled 21 April, by Sadler's Wells (USA) – won 4 races including G1 Dewhurst S, Newmarket; G2 Champagne S, Doncaster; LR Newmarket S, Newmarket from 6 starts in England 1988–9; died during 1989
- 1987 RUBY SETTING (GB) : Bay filly, foaled 20 April, by Gorytus (USA) – won 1 race and placed 5 times from 8 starts in England 1989–90
- 1988 BALLET QUEEN (IRE) : Bay filly, foaled 16 April, by Sadler's Wells (USA) – unraced, dam of winners including Fusaichi Concorde (JPN)(1993, by Caerleon <USA> – 1st G1 Tokyo Yushun (Japanese Derby), sire in Japan), Born King (JPN)(1998, by Sunday Silence <USA> – G3 Kesei Hai, Nakayama)
- 1989 SUN SEEKER (IRE) : Bay colt, foaled 16 May, by Rainbow Quest (USA) – won once and placed once from 3 starts in England 1992
- 1990 BALLET PRINCE (IRE) : Bay colt, foaled 1 January, by Sadler's Wells (USA) – won 2 races and placed 7 times including 2nd LR Prix Moskowa, Chantilly; 3rd LR Glorious S, Goodwood; 3rd G3 Prix Gladiateur, Longchamp from 20 starts in England, France, Germany, Sweden and Denmark 1993-7
- 1991 GOLDEN BALL (IRE) : Bay colt, foaled 2 May, by Sadler's Wells (USA) – won once and placed 7 times including 2nd LR Magnolia S, Kempton; 3rd LR March S, Goodwood from 13 starts in England 1993-5
- 1992 STAGE STRUCK (IRE) : Bay filly, foaled 12 May, by Sadler's Wells (USA) – won 1 race and placed twice from 7 starts in Britain 1994–5. Grand-dam of the Fillies' Revue winner No One.
- 1994 ROYAL CASTLE (IRE) : Bay colt (gelded), foaled 1 January, by Caerleon (USA) – won 5 races and placed 8 times from 41 starts on the flat in Britain and France. Also won 4 hurdle races and 2 steeplechases from 28 starts under National Hunt rules plus 2 Point-to-Points.
- 1997 SUNNY SPELL (IRE) : Chesnut filly, foaled 1 January, by Nashwan (USA) – unplaced only start in Ireland 2001
- 1999 PRINCELY VENTURE (IRE) : Chesnut colt, foaled 2 April, by Entrepreneur (GB) – won 3 races including G2 Scottish Derby, Ayr from 7 starts in England, France and Dubai 2001–2006
- 2000 GOLD BAR (IRE) : Bay filly, foaled 2 June, by Barathea (IRE) – placed 3 times from 8 starts in England and France 2003

== Pedigree ==
Pedigree of Sun Princess (IRE), bay mare, 1980
| Sire English Prince (IRE) 1971 | Petingo (GB); 1965 | Petition | Fair Trial |
| Sire English Prince (IRE) 1971 | Petingo (GB); 1965 | Petition | Art Paper |
| Sire English Prince (IRE) 1971 | Petingo (GB); 1965 | Alcazar | Alycidon |
| Sire English Prince (IRE) 1971 | Petingo (GB); 1965 | Alcazar | Quarterdeck |
| Sire English Prince (IRE) 1971 | English Miss (GB); 1955 | Bois Roussel | Vatout |
| Sire English Prince (IRE) 1971 | English Miss (GB); 1955 | Bois Roussel | Plucky Liege |
| Sire English Prince (IRE) 1971 | English Miss (GB); 1955 | Virelle | Casterari |
| Sire English Prince (IRE) 1971 | English Miss (GB); 1955 | Virelle | Perfume |
| Dam Sunny Valley (IRE) 1972 | Val de Loir (FR); 1959 | Vieux Manoir | Brantôme |
| Dam Sunny Valley (IRE) 1972 | Val de Loir (FR); 1959 | Vieux Manoir | Vieille Maison |
| Dam Sunny Valley (IRE) 1972 | Val de Loir (FR); 1959 | Vali | Sunny Boy |
| Dam Sunny Valley (IRE) 1972 | Val de Loir (FR); 1959 | Vali | Her Slipper |
| Dam Sunny Valley (IRE) 1972 | Sunland (GB); 1965 | Charlottesville | Prince Chevalier |
| Dam Sunny Valley (IRE) 1972 | Sunland (GB); 1965 | Charlottesville | Noorani |
| Dam Sunny Valley (IRE) 1972 | Sunland (GB); 1965 | Sunny Gulf | Persian Gulf |
| Dam Sunny Valley (IRE) 1972 | Sunland (GB); 1965 | Sunny Gulf | Solana (Family:1-l) |
