= Retractable roof =

Type of roof that can retract

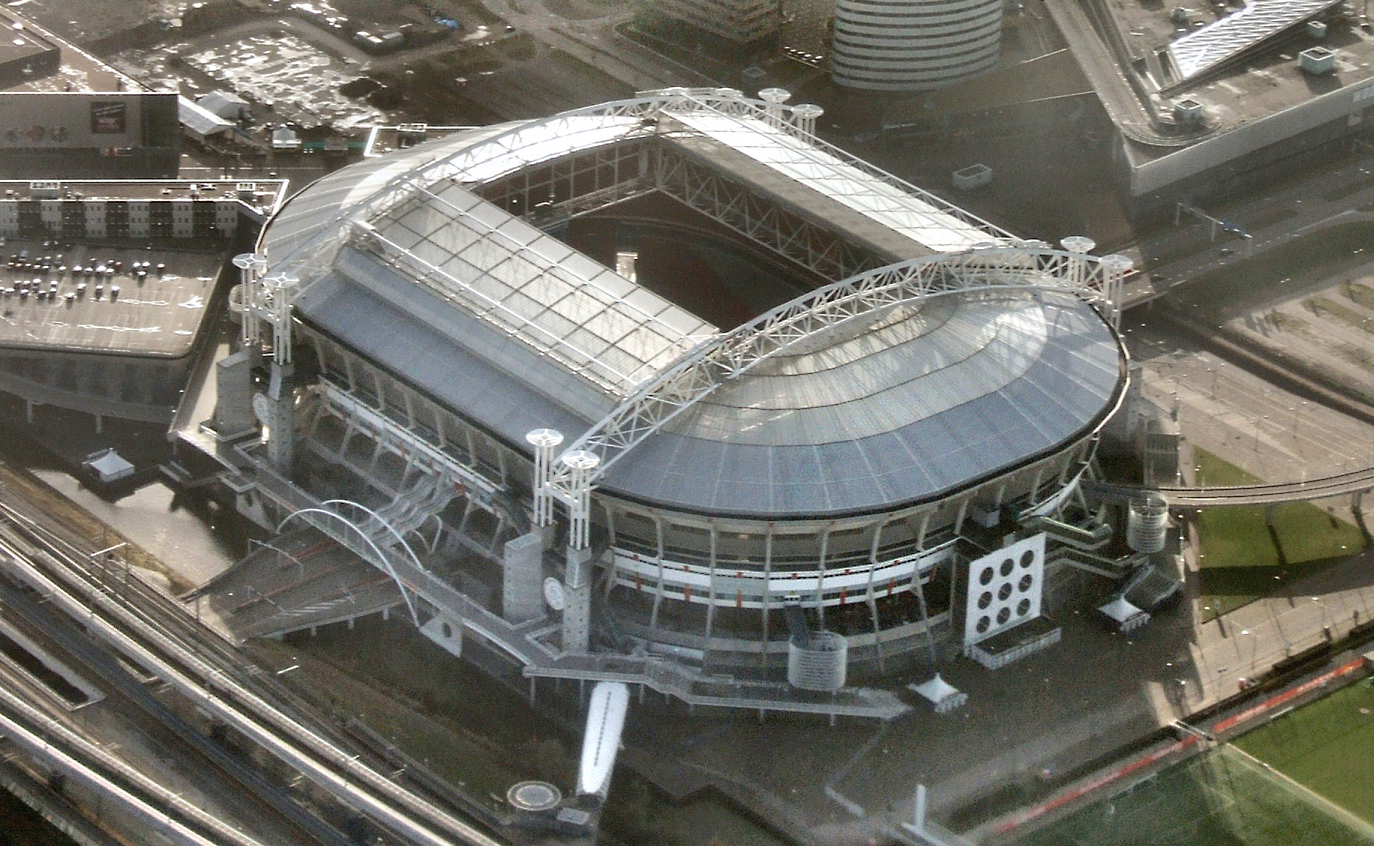

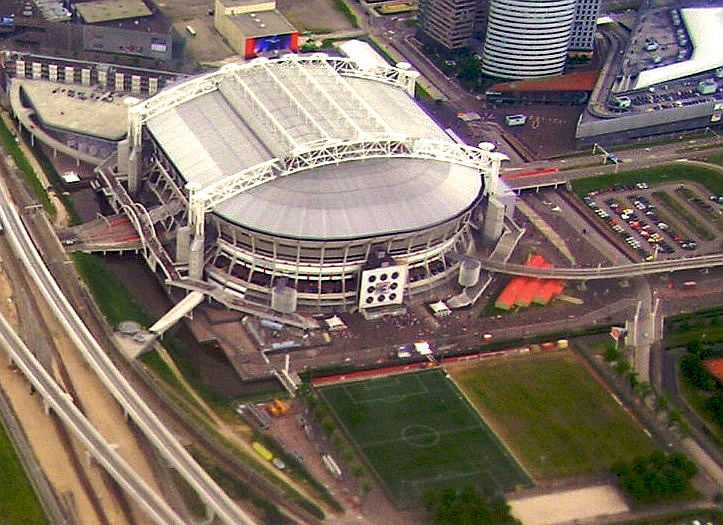
The Johan Cruyff Arena in Amsterdam, with the retractable roof opened and closed

A retractable roof is a roof system designed to roll back the roof of a structure so that the interior of the facility is open to the outdoors. Retractable roofs are sometimes referred to as operable roofs or retractable skylights. The term operable skylight, while quite similar, refers to a skylight that opens on a hinge, rather than on a track.

Retractable roofs are used in residences, restaurants and bars, swim centres, arenas and stadiums, and other facilities wishing to provide protection from the elements, as well as the option of having an open roof during favourable weather.

== History ==
The United States Patent and Trademark Office (USPTO) records show that David S. Miller, founder of Rollamatic Retractable Roofs, filed U.S. patent 3,277,619 in August 1963 for "a movable and remotely controllable roof section for houses and other types of buildings".

== Shapes and sizes ==
While any shape is possible, common shapes are flat, ridge, hip-ridge, barrel and dome. A residence might incorporate one or more 3' by 5' retractables; a bar or restaurant a retractable roof measuring 20' by 30'; and a meeting hall a 50' by 100' bi-parting-over-stationary.

== Sports venues ==
Stadium retractable roofs are generally used in locales where inclement weather, extreme heat, or extreme cold are prevalent during the respective sports seasons, in order to allow for playing of traditionally outdoor sports in more favourable conditions, as well as the comfort of spectators watching games played in such weather. Unlike their predecessors, the domes built primarily during the 1960s, 1970s, and early 1980s, retractable roofs also allow for playing of the same traditionally outdoor sports in outdoor conditions when the weather is more favourable.

Another purpose of retractable roofs is to allow for growth of natural grass playing fields in environments where extreme hot and/or cold temperatures would otherwise make installation and maintenance of such a field cost prohibitive. Installations throughout the world employ a variety of different configurations and styles.

=== The first retractable-roof stadiums ===
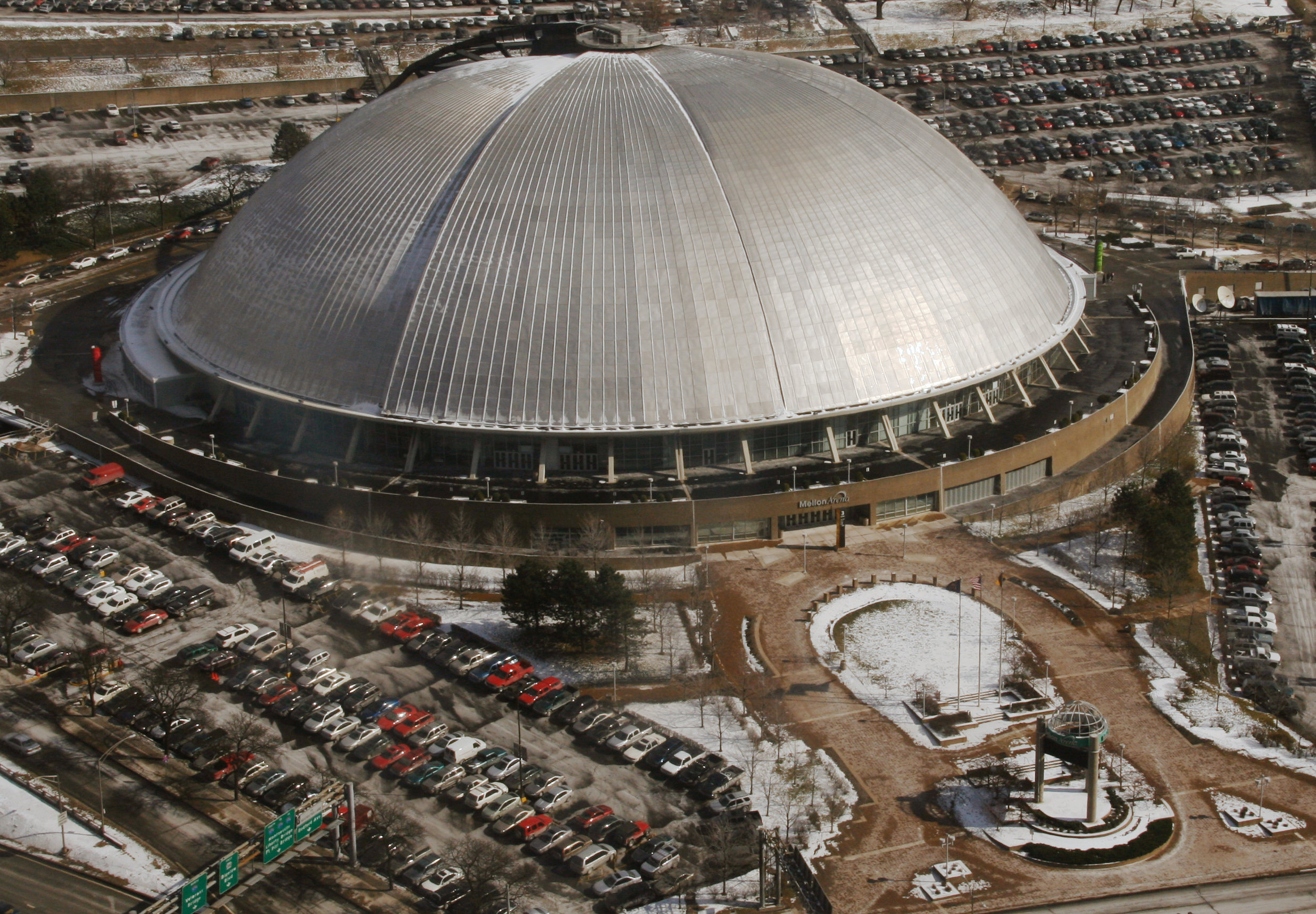
Civic Arena, built in 1961

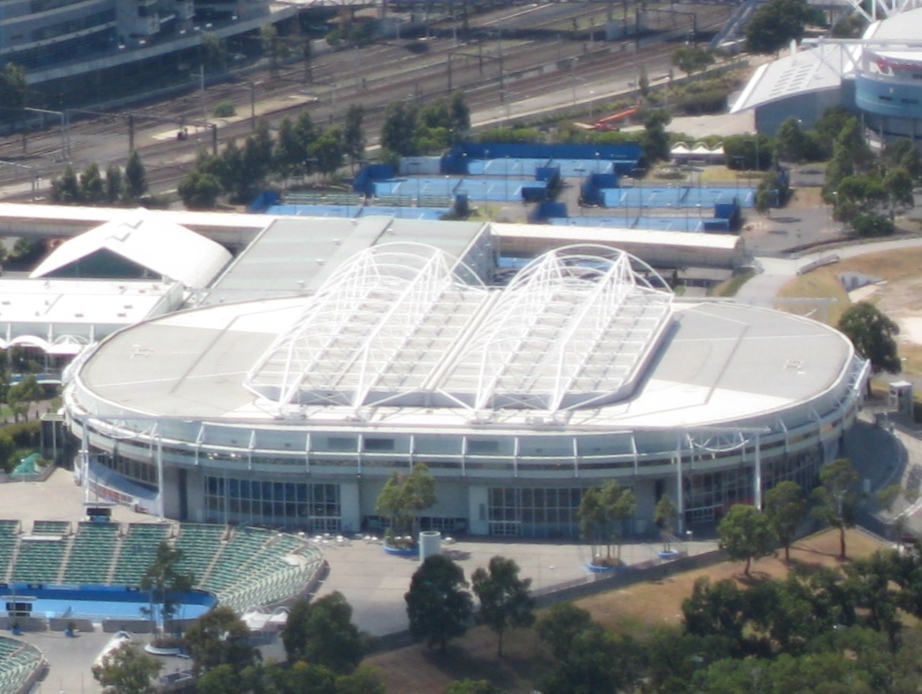
Rod Laver Arena, Melbourne.

The first retractable roof sports venue was the now-demolished Civic Arena in Pittsburgh, Pennsylvania, United States. Constructed in 1961 for the Pittsburgh Civic Light Opera, the arena was home to minor league basketball, college basketball, and minor league ice hockey teams before becoming the home of the Pittsburgh Penguins of the National Hockey League (NHL) and Pittsburgh Pipers of the American Basketball Association (ABA) in 1967, as well as hosting over a dozen regular season National Basketball Association (NBA) games in the 1960s and 1970s. The arena's dome-shaped roof covered 170,000 square feet (16,000 m^{2}) and was made up of eight equal segments constructed from close to 3,000 tons of steel, in which six segments could retract underneath the remaining two, supported by a 260-foot (79 m) long exterior cantilevered arm.

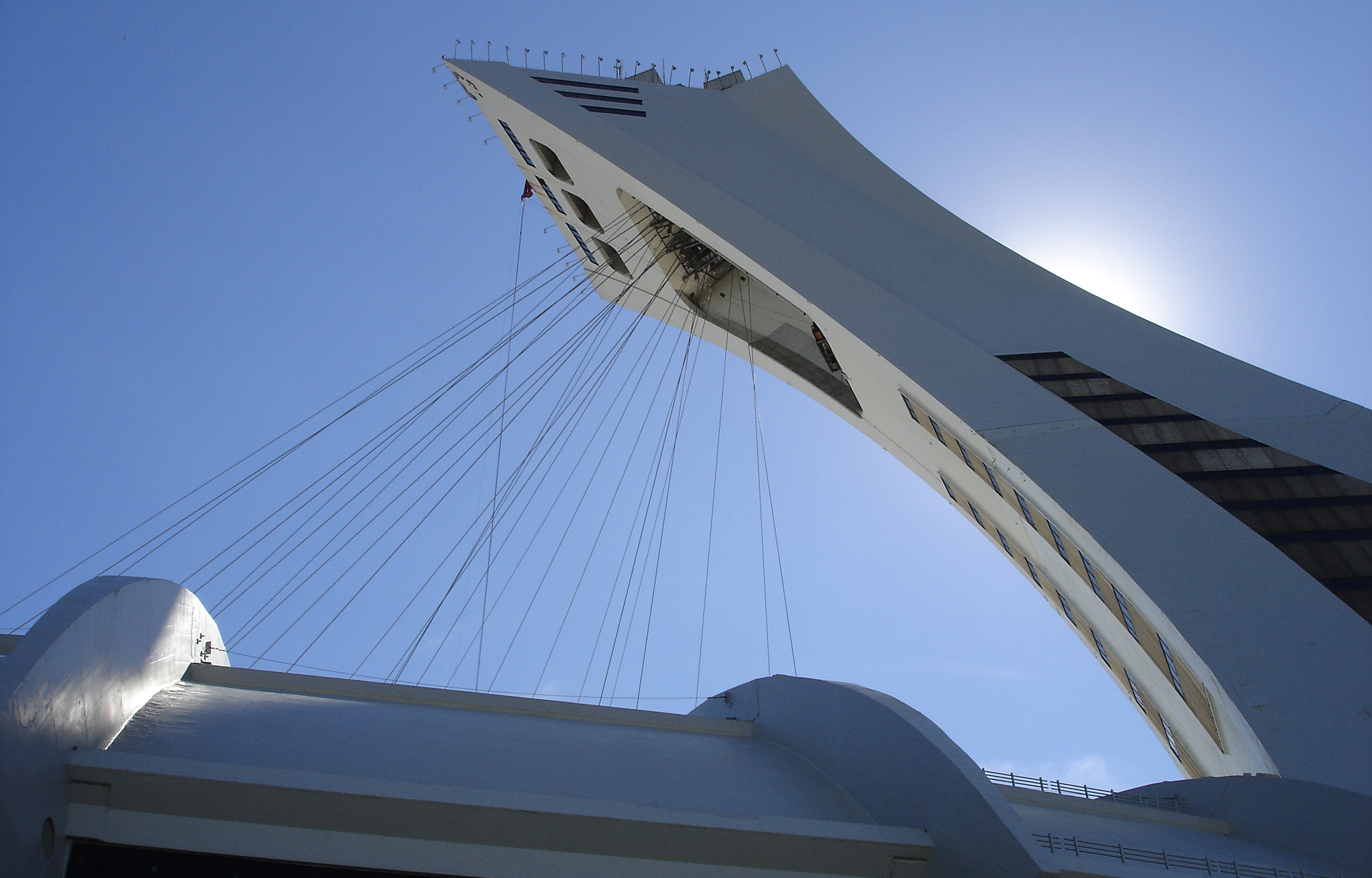
Tower and cables for retractable roof at the Olympic Stadium, Montreal

Olympic Stadium in Montreal, Quebec was slated to be the first outdoor retractable roof stadium at its debut for the 1976 Summer Olympics. However, plagued by construction problems, the roof was not installed until 1987, and was not retractable until 1988. Even then, movement of the roof was impossible in high wind conditions, and technical problems plagued the facility. A permanent, fixed roof was installed in 1998.

The Centre Court at the National Tennis Centre, now called the Rod Laver Arena, in Melbourne, Australia opened in January 1988. It was the first retractable roof system installed in a Grand Slam tennis venue. The roof enables matches to continue during rain, extreme heat, and in the presence of smoke from bushfires in surrounding regions.

The Rogers Centre (formerly known as SkyDome) in Toronto, Ontario had a fully functional retractable roof at its debut in 1989.

=== Types of stadium retractable roofs ===
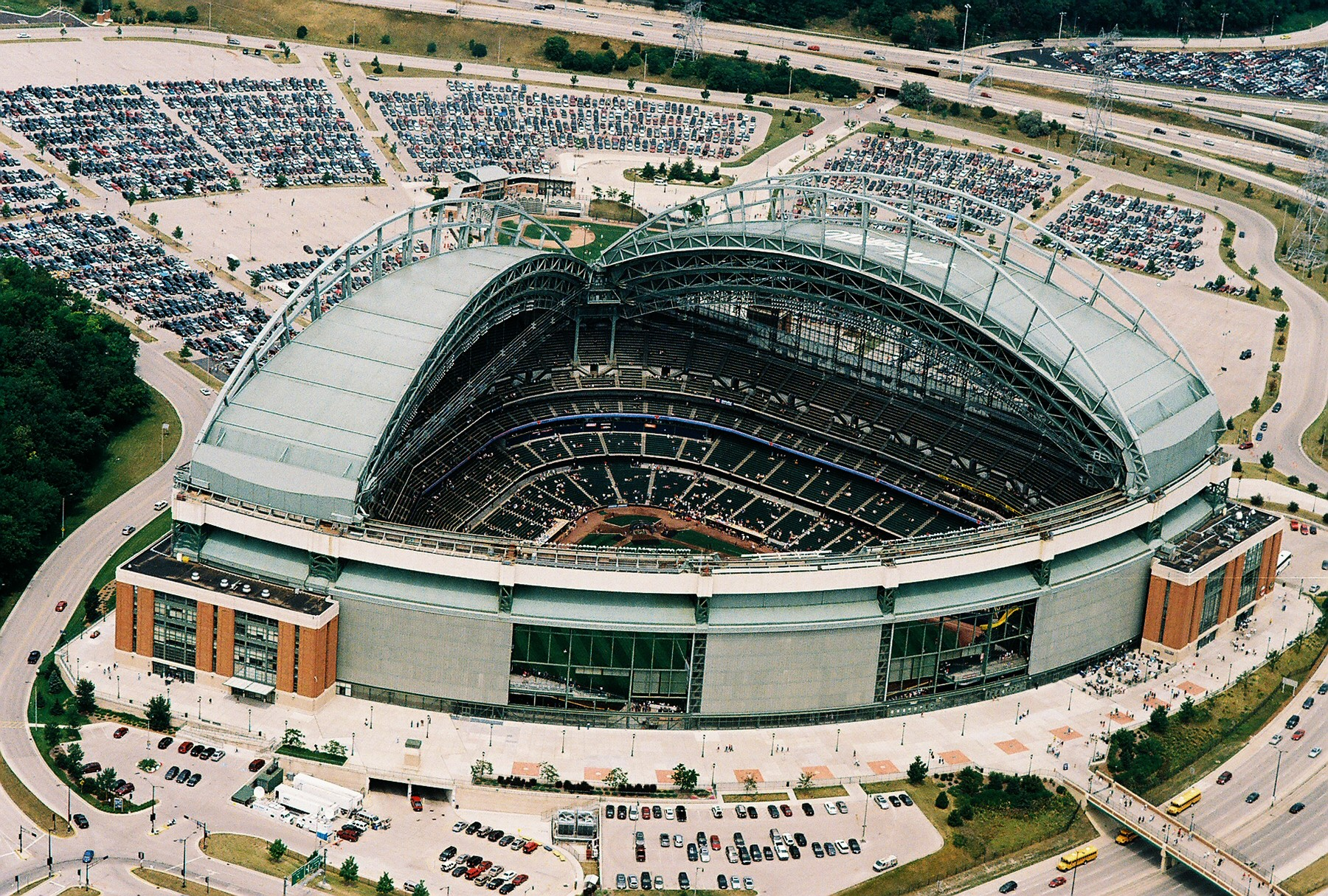
American Family Field, Milwaukee, Wisconsin with a fan style roof.

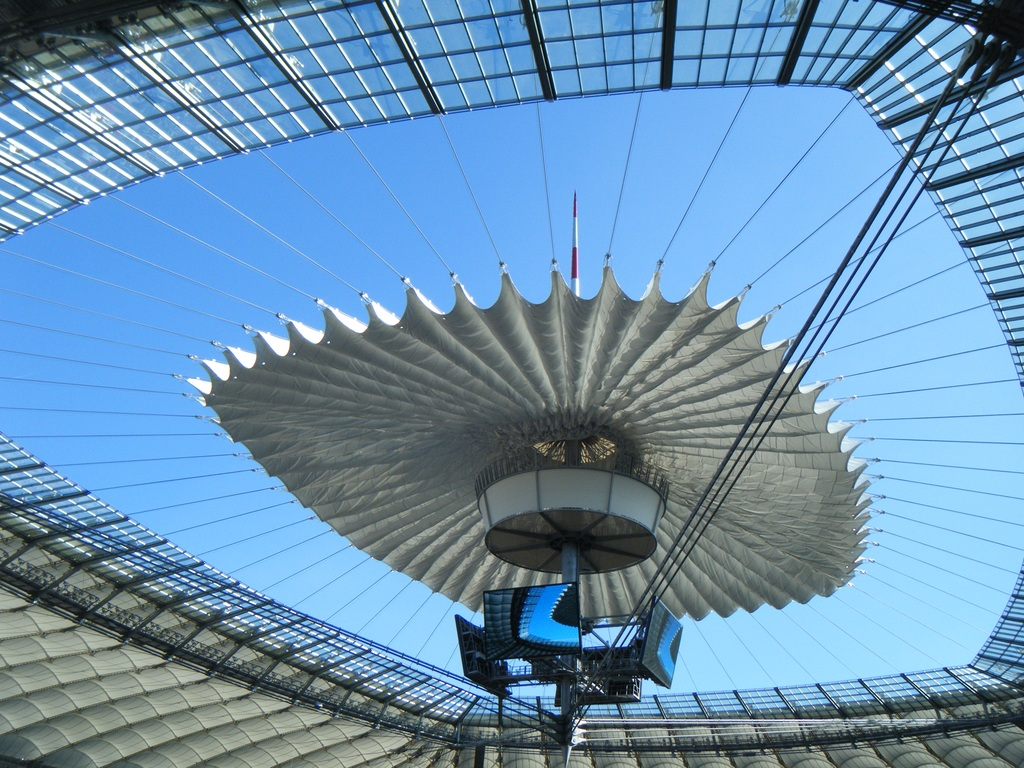
National Stadium, Warsaw.

Architecturally, retractable roofs vary greatly from stadium to stadium in shape, material and movement. For example, American Family Field has a fan style roof, while Toyota Stadium in Japan has an accordion-like roof. Most retractable roofs are made of metal, while some, such as the roof of State Farm Stadium, are made of water-resistant fabric. Although each retractable roof differs in these aspects, the roof of T-Mobile Park is unique in that it is the only one in North America that does not form a climate-controlled enclosure when in the extended position; rather, it acts as an "umbrella" to cover the playing field and spectator areas during inclement weather, with no side walls enclosing the stadium.

=== Gameplay with retractable roofs ===
In North American major sports leagues, specific rules exist governing the movement of retractable roofs before and during gameplay. These rules vary between the NFL and MLB, as well as from stadium to stadium. In general, if a game begins with the roof open and weather conditions become less favourable, the home team may, with the approval of the field officials and visiting team, request the roof be closed. (Such a scenario is generally rare, due to the accuracy of modern weather forecasting and a general err on the side of caution that keeps a roof closed if there is any significant threat of precipitation.) Depending on the stadium, weather or gameplay conditions, and the judgment of the officials, play may or may not continue until the roof is fully closed. If the game begins with the roof closed, it may be opened under some circumstances depending on the venue. If it is closed after the game begins, typically it must remain closed for the duration of the game.

== Alternatives to retractable roofs ==
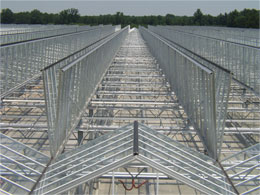
Open roof system used by a facility construction company

Some modern athletic facilities are using less-complex roof systems commonly referred to as open roofs. These are constructed with similar materials as retractable roofs, such as polycarbonate or tempered glass roofs. Hinged at the structure's gutters, open roofs fully close and open by the mechanics of a rack and pinion system or a push/pull drive system. Open roofs are typically seen at smaller athletic venues such as country clubs and universities, and also in the construction of commercial greenhouses and garden centres for climate control purposes.

== See also ==
- Category:Retractable-pitch stadiums
