= Hellenic (horse) =

Irish-bred Thoroughbred racehorse

- Racing silks of Arnold Weinstock
- Sire: Darshaan
- Grandsire: Shirley Heights
- Dam: Grecian Sea
- Damsire: Homeric
- Sex: Mare
- Foaled: 27 April 1987
- Country: Ireland
- Colour: Bay
- Breeder: Ballymacoll Stud
- Owner: Arnold Weinstock
- Trainer: Michael Stoute
- Record: 6: 3-1-0
- Earnings: £201,008

Major wins
- Middleton Stakes (1990); Ribblesdale Stakes (1990); Yorkshire Oaks (1990)

Hellenic (25 April 1987 – 15 July 2011) was an Irish-bred, British-trained Thoroughbred racehorse and broodmare bred by the Ballymacoll Stud. After finishing unplaced in her only start as a juvenile, she improved to become a top-class stayer in the summer and autumn of 1990. She won both the Ribblesdale Stakes and the Yorkshire Oaks before finishing second when favourite for the St Leger and being the first filly home in the Prix de l'Arc de Triomphe. She later became an outstanding broodmare, producing Islington, and several other major winners. She was retired from breeding in 2010 and died a year later.

== Background ==
Hellenic was a bay mare with no white markings bred in County Meath by the Ballymacoll Stud. She was sired by Darshaan who won the Prix du Jockey Club for the Aga Khan in 1984 before becoming a successful breeding stallion. The best of his other offspring included Dalakhani, Mark of Esteem and Kotashaan. Hellenic's dam Grecian Sea won one minor race and produced several other winners. She was descended from Knighton House, a full-sister to Reform and a distant relative of North Light and Golan.

During her racing career the filly was trained at Freemason Lodge in Newmarket, Suffolk by Michael Stoute and ran in the colours of Ballymacoll's part-owner Arnold Weinstock. She was ridden in all but one of her races by Walter Swinburn.

== Racing career ==
=== 1989: two-year-old season ===
Hellenic made her only appearance as a two-year-old on 7 November 1989 when she ran in a maiden race over one mile at Leicester Racecourse. She started at odds of 11/4 and finished fourth of the seventeen runners behind Lover's Moon, Sanglamore and Visage.

=== 1990: three-year-old season ===
Hellenic began her second season in the Middleton Stakes at York Racecourse on 16 May. The race is now a Group Two race for older fillies and mares but was then a Graduation race, restricted to three-year-old fillies with no more than one previous win. Starting favourite in a seven-runner field she took the lead approaching the last quarter mile and won by two lengths from the outsider Ballet Classique. On her next appearance, Hellenic was sent to Royal Ascot and moved up in class and distance for the Group Two Ribblesdale Stakes over one and a half miles and started the 6/1 third favourite behind Line of Thunder, a filly who had not run since being narrowly beaten in the 1989 Cheveley Park Stakes and Pharian (winner of the Cheshire Oaks). Hellenic turned into the straight in fourth place, took the lead approaching the final furlong and drew away to win by six lengths from Ivrea, with gaps of seven and five lengths back to Gharam and Spode's Blue in third and fourth.

In the Group One Yorkshire Oaks on 22 August, Hellenic started 100/30 second favourite behind her stablemate Kartajana, the winner of the Nassau Stakes. Swinburn opted to ride Kartajana whilst the veteran Scottish jockey Willie Carson took the mount on Hellenic. The other four runners were Wajd (Prix Minerve), Game Plan (Pretty Polly Stakes, runner-up in The Oaks), Cruising Height (runner-up in the Lancashire Oaks) and Ruby Tiger (later to win the E. P. Taylor Stakes). Hellenic was towards the rear of the field in the early stages as Cruising Height set the pace from Kartajana and began to come under pressure at half way. Kartajana took the lead approaching the last quarter mile but Hellenic, switched to the outside by Carson, began to make progress before overtaking her stable companion inside the final furlong and winning by one and a half lengths.

On 15 September at Doncaster, Hellenic was the only filly in an eight-runner field for the St Leger and started the 2/1 favourite ahead of the colts River God (Queen's Vase) and Snurge. Hellenic took the lead in the straight but was overtaken by Snurge two furlongs out. The pair drew away from their rivals in the closing stages with the colt prevailing by three quarters of a length. Three weeks later, Hellenic was sent to France to contest Europe's most prestigious weight-for-age race, the Prix de l'Arc de Triomphe over 2400 metres at Longchamp Racecourse. She finished eighth of the twenty-one runners, seven lengths behind the winner Saumarez, and achieved the best placing of the three-year-old fillies, ahead of In the Groove and Salsabil.

== Breeding record ==
Hellenic was retired from racing for become a broodmare for the Ballymacoll Stud. She was a great success in the breeding paddocks, producing at least nine winners from fourteen foals including the Group One winners Islington, Greek Dance and Mountain High:

- Election Day, a bay colt, foaled in 1992, sired by Sadler's Wells. Won two races including the Listed Aston Park Stakes and finished third in the Ascot Gold Cup.
- Desert Beauty, bay filly, 1994, by Green Desert. Won two races.
- Greek Dance, bay colt, 1995, by Sadler's Wells. Won four races including the Bayerisches Zuchtrennen.
- Greek Academy, bay colt, 1996, by Royal Academy. Unraced.
- Welsh Star, chestnut colt, 1997, by Caerleon. Unraced.
- Islington, bay filly, 1999, by Sadler's Wells. Won six races including the Nassau Stakes, Yorkshire Oaks and Breeders' Cup Filly & Mare Turf
- Olympienne, bay filly, 2000, by Sadler's Wells. Unraced.
- New Morning, bay filly, 2001, by Sadler's Wells. Won three races including Brigadier Gerard Stakes.
- Mountain High, bay colt, 2002, by Danehill. Won four races including the Grand Prix de Saint-Cloud.
- Greek Well, bay colt (later gelded), 2003, by Sadler's Wells. Won three races.
- Praxiteles, bay colt (later gelded), 2004, by Sadler's Wells. Won six races.
- Thespis of Icaria, bay colt, 2006, by Sadler's Wells. Won two races.
- La Divina, bay filly, 2007, by Sadler's Wells. Unplaced in only start.
- Just Look Don'tTouch, filly, 2008, by Galileo. Unraced.

She was retired from breeding in 2010 at the age of 23. The Ballymacoll Stud manager Peter Reynolds said "She's in perfect health and looks brilliant. She has only missed one year since she retired, but can't go on forever. She is a wonderful character, very easy to do anything with, a proper lady." She was euthanized at Ballymacoll in July 2011. Reynolds commented "she has had trouble with chronic arthritis. It is one thing to be dealing with in July but it would have been a lot harder for her in the winter months and the one thing you don't want to see is a horse suffer, so we did what we felt was the kindest thing for her."

== Pedigree ==
Pedigree of Hellenic (IRE), bay mare, 1987
| Sire Darshaan (GB) 1981 | Shirley Heights (GB); 1975 | Mill Reef | Never Bend |
| Sire Darshaan (GB) 1981 | Shirley Heights (GB); 1975 | Mill Reef | Milan Mill |
| Sire Darshaan (GB) 1981 | Shirley Heights (GB); 1975 | Hardiemma | Hardicanute |
| Sire Darshaan (GB) 1981 | Shirley Heights (GB); 1975 | Hardiemma | Grand Cross |
| Sire Darshaan (GB) 1981 | Delsy (FR); 1972 | Abdos | Arbar |
| Sire Darshaan (GB) 1981 | Delsy (FR); 1972 | Abdos | Pretty Lady |
| Sire Darshaan (GB) 1981 | Delsy (FR); 1972 | Kelty | Venture VII |
| Sire Darshaan (GB) 1981 | Delsy (FR); 1972 | Kelty | Marilla |
| Dam Grecian Sea (FR) 1978 | Homeric (GB); 1968 | Ragusa | Ribot |
| Dam Grecian Sea (FR) 1978 | Homeric (GB); 1968 | Ragusa | Fantan |
| Dam Grecian Sea (FR) 1978 | Homeric (GB); 1968 | Darlene | Dante |
| Dam Grecian Sea (FR) 1978 | Homeric (GB); 1968 | Darlene | Admirals Love |
| Dam Grecian Sea (FR) 1978 | Sea Venture (FR); 1973 | Diatome | Sicambre |
| Dam Grecian Sea (FR) 1978 | Sea Venture (FR); 1973 | Diatome | Dictaway |
| Dam Grecian Sea (FR) 1978 | Sea Venture (FR); 1973 | Knighton House | Pall Mall |
| Dam Grecian Sea (FR) 1978 | Sea Venture (FR); 1973 | Knighton House | Country House (Family: 5-h) |
