= Coniston Bluebird (horse) =

Australian-bred Thoroughbred racehorse

- Sire: Scenic
- Grandsire: Sadler's Wells
- Dam: Turbo Lady
- Damsire: Bellotto
- Sex: Gelding
- Foaled: 2005
- Country: Australia
- Colour: Bay
- Breeder: Durham Lodge Thoroughbred Stud
- Owner: Murray Livestock, J E O'Brien, J E & R Standford & J Wilson
- Trainer: Bede Murray
- Record: 19:4-2-5
- Earnings: $1,473,712

Major wins
- New Zealand Derby (2009)
- Last updated on 15 April 2010

Coniston Bluebird (foaled 2005 in Australia) is a thoroughbred racehorse who won the 2009 New Zealand Derby. Trainer Bede Murray had the New Zealand Derby in mind for Coniston Bluebird after the horse had shown promise as a stayer in Australia, including a win over 2100m. However, those plans became doubtful when he was well beaten in weak company at his final start before going to New Zealand. However, the trip was pursued with. The horse ran a good third in the traditional Derby lead-up, the Championship Stakes, won by Down The Road on a wet track. The performance would see him close as favourite in the derby. Rain again affected the track for the Derby, and the race was postponed 24 hours due to storm warnings. The race proved to be an exciting contest, as Coniston Bluebird and Down The Road ran clear from the field in the straight and were involved in a photo-finish.

Coniston Bluebird's first run after the New Zealand Derby was an eighth in the Rosehill Guineas, which was followed by a 12th placing in the AJC Australian Derby. Injury kept him out of the 2009/10 season.

Coniston Bluebird underwent successful surgery and stem-cell treatment and returned to the racetrack in September 2010. He has failed to place in seven starts since his return to the racetrack.
