= 1989 Major Indoor Lacrosse League season =

1989 MILL season
- League: Major Indoor Lacrosse League
- Sport: Indoor lacrosse
- Duration: January 7, 1989 - April 7, 1989
- Games: 8
- Teams: 6

Draft
- Top draft pick: David Desko
- Picked by: New England Blazers

Regular season
- League champions: Philadelphia Wings
- Runners-up: Detroit Turbos
- Top scorer: Brad Kotz (Philadelphia Wings)

Champion's Cup
- Champions: Philadelphia Wings (1st title)
- Runners-up: New York Saints
- Finals MVP: John Tucker (Philadelphia)

MILL seasons
- ← 1988 season 1990 season →

The 1989 season is the 3rd season of the league that began on January 7, 1989 and concluded with the championship game on April 7.

== Team movement ==
1989 saw the MILL expand by two teams: the New England Blazers and the Detroit Turbos. The New Jersey Saints also moved to Long Island, New York, becoming the New York Saints.

=== Teams ===
1989 Major Indoor Lacrosse League
Team	City	Arena	Capacity
Baltimore Thunder	Baltimore, Maryland	Baltimore Arena	10,582
Detroit Turbos	Detroit, Michigan	Joe Louis Arena	19,875
New England Blazers	Worcester, Massachusetts	Worcester Centrum	12,135
New York Saints	Uniondale, New York	Nassau Veterans Memorial Coliseum	16,297
Philadelphia Wings	Philadelphia, Pennsylvania	Spectrum	17,423
Washington Wave	Landover, Maryland	Capital Centre	18,130

=== Map of teams ===
Major Indoor Lacrosse League Teams

== Regular season ==
P	Team	GP	W	L	PCT	GB	Home	Road	GF	GA	Diff	GF/GP	GA/GP
1	Philadelphia Wings – xyz	8	6	2	.750	0.0	4–0	2–2	103	83	+20	12.88	10.38
2	Detroit Turbos – x	8	6	2	.750	0.0	3–1	3–1	118	96	+22	14.75	12.00
3	New York Saints – x	8	6	2	.750	0.0	2–2	4–0	104	87	+17	13.00	10.88
4	Baltimore Thunder	8	4	4	.500	2.0	1–3	3–1	103	96	+7	12.88	12.00
5	New England Blazers	8	1	7	.125	5.0	0–4	1–3	80	102	−22	10.00	12.75
6	Washington Wave	8	1	7	.125	5.0	0–4	1–3	70	114	−44	8.75	14.25

x: Clinched playoff berth; c: Clinched playoff berth by crossing over to another division; y: Clinched division; z: Clinched best regular season record; GP: Games Played
W: Wins; L: Losses; GB: Games back; PCT: Win percentage; Home: Record at Home; Road: Record on the Road; GF: Goals scored; GA: Goals allowed
Differential: Difference between goals scored and allowed; GF/GP: Average number of goals scored per game; GA/GP: Average number of goals allowed per game

== Playoffs ==
Semifinals			Championship
			3	New York	10
3	New York	9**	1	Philadelphia	11
2	Detroit	8

- * indicates an overtime period.

== Awards ==
Award	Winner	Team
Championship Game MVP	John Tucker	Philadelphia

== Statistics leaders ==
Bold numbers indicate new single-season records. Italics indicate tied single-season records.

Stat	Player	Team	Number
Goals	Brad Kotz	Philadelphia	**28**
Assists	John Tucker	Philadelphia	**24**
Points	Brad Kotz	Philadelphia	34
Penalty Minutes	Jeff Goldberg	New York	**28**
Shots on Goal	Brad Kotz	Philadelphia	66
Loose Balls	J. Fay	New England	**57**

== Attendance ==
=== Regular season ===
Home team	Home games	Average attendance	Total attendance
Philadelphia Wings	4	14,709	58,834
Detroit Turbos	4	12,290	49,159
New York Saints	4	8,608	34,433
New England Blazers	4	8,038	32,153
Washington Wave	4	7,824	31,295
Baltimore Thunder	4	6,200	24,800
**League**	**24**	**9,611**	**230,674**

=== Playoffs ===
Home team	Home games	Average attendance	Total attendance
Philadelphia Wings	1	16,042	16,042
Detroit Turbos	1	8,319	8,319
**League**	**2**	**12,181**	**24,361**

== See also ==
- 1989 in sports
- 1989 Philadelphia Wings
