= Ballymacoll Stud =

Stud farm in Ireland

Coordinates: 53°24′41.96″N 6°31′16.48″W

- Racing silks of Ballymacoll Stud
- Country: Ireland (Republic of Ireland)
- County: Meath
- Acreage: 300
- Purchased: 1960
- Owner: Family of Lord Weinstock

Horses (Approx)
- Broodmares: 16
- Foals: 9
- Yearlings: 11
- Horses in Training: 21

Ballymacoll Stud is a Thoroughbred stud farm of 300 acres in County Meath, Ireland. It is located in the townland of Ballymacoll, approximately two miles from the village of Dunboyne and four miles (6 km) from the town of Maynooth. Under the ownership of Michael Sobell and Arnold Weinstock and his family, it produced 29 individual Group One (G1) winners of 52 Group 1 races between 1960 and 2017. The stud was sold at auction in June 2017 for €8.15 million to an undisclosed buyer.

Ballymacoll Estate was founded by Henry Hamilton (1760–1844). It remained in Hamilton hands until January 1911, when it was sold to Lord Nugent. Other owners and tenants followed, including Boss Croker, the trainer, the Inchape Family, and the Irish Army (during World War II).

In April 1946, the property was purchased by the Hon. Dorothy Paget, daughter of Lord Queenborough and Pauline (daughter of William C. Whitney). She owned the stud until her death in February 1960 at the age of 54. Despite owning the stud, Dorothy Paget never actually visited the farm herself, but she did from time to time receive detailed reports, illustrated with photographs.

Sir Gordon Richards, had been Dorothy Paget's principal jockey and trainer, right up the time of her death. He was instrumental in persuading the then Mr. Michael Sobell, the industrialist and philanthropist (later Sir Michael Sobell), and his son-in-law, Sir Arnold Weinstock, Managing Director of G.E.C. (later Lord Weinstock) to buy the farm in June 1960. The price agreed for the 300-acre (1.2 km^{2}) farm, together with approximately 130 horses was £250,000.

Following the purchase, horses surplus to requirements were sold at the Newmarket sales that year. In 1967 the main house at Ballymacoll, which had stood semi-derelict for many years was demolished.

In 1974 Lord Weinstock's son, the Hon. Simon Weinstock became a partner in Ballymacoll with his father. Simon took a very active role in the running of the stud and took particular responsibility for the matings. Simon Weinstock died in May 1996, at the age of 44. Lord Weinstock died in July 2002, after which the stud was run by Weinstock's executors on behalf of his family as a self-sufficient operation. Soon after his death Islington won her first Group 1 race when winning the Nassau Stakes. She went on to win three more Group 1 races in 2002 and 2003. In 2004 North Light won the Epsom Derby to give the stud and Weinstock family their second success in this race.

In recent years Ballymacoll have had added to their Group 1 record on the racetrack. In June 2008 Ballymacoll finished second in The Derby with Tartan Bearer. Conduit went on to win the St Leger at Doncaster in September. He then added to his Group 1 tally by winning the Breeders' Cup Turf at Santa Anita in October. In 2009 Conduit continued his Group 1 trail by winning the King George VI and Queen Elizabeth Stakes at Ascot. This result completed a 1-2 for Ballymacoll with Tartan Bearer second (his third second place in Group 1 races). Conduit returned to Santa Anita on November 7, 2009 to repeat his feat of 12 months previously and take the Breeders' Cup Turf for a second time. In 2013 Fiorente (having been sold to race in Australia) won the Melbourne Cup at his second attempt (he was second in 2012). He later won the Group 1 Australian Cup.

== Group 1 Winners ==
- Admetus
- Conduit
- Dart Board
- Desert Boy
- Emmson
- Fastness
- Fiorente
- Gamut
- Glass Harmonium
- Golan
- Greek Dance
- Helen Street
- Hellenic
- Indian Danehill
- Islington
- Lancastrian
- Mountain High
- North Light
- Pilsudski
- Prince of Dance
- Reform
- Saddlers' Hall
- Sallust
- Sharper
- Sought Out
- Spectrum
- Sun Prince
- Sun Princess
- Troy
