= Silver Patriarch =

Irish-bred Thoroughbred racehorse (1994–2009)

- Sire: Saddlers' Hall
- Grandsire: Sadler's Wells
- Dam: Early Rising
- Damsire: Grey Dawn
- Sex: Stallion
- Foaled: 1994
- Country: Ireland
- Colour: Grey
- Breeder: Peter Winfield
- Owner: Peter Winfield
- Trainer: John Dunlop
- Record: 24: 8-6-2
- Earnings: £918,254

Major wins
- Zetland Stakes (1996); Lingfield Derby Trial (1997); St Leger (1997); Coronation Cup (1998); Gran Premio del Jockey Club (1998); Jockey Club Stakes (1999); Geoffrey Freer Stakes (1999); Timeform rating: 125
- Last updated on 23 September 2025

Silver Patriarch (8 May 1994 – 11 October 2009) was an Irish-bred, British-trained Thoroughbred racehorse. He won the 1997 St Leger and seven other races.

Sired by Saddlers' Hall out of the American mare Early Rising, the horse was bred in Ireland but trained in Britain by John Dunlop. He was ridden by Pat Eddery in all but three of his races. After winning two of his four starts as a two-year-old, at Newmarket and Pontefract, he finished third in the Sandown Classic Trial at Sandown Park in April 1997. He then won the Lingfield Derby Trial before being touched off by Benny the Dip in an extremely tight finish to the 1997 Derby.

Silver Patriarch started favourite for the 1997 Irish Derby but finished a disappointing fifth to Desert King, beaten thirteen lengths. He then came second to Stowaway in the Great Voltigeur Stakes at York, beaten half a length. His greatest triumph came in the St Leger at Doncaster, for which he started 5-4 favourite.

As a four-year-old Silver Patriarch finished runner-up in the Geoffrey Freer Stakes at Newbury and a narrow second to Romanov in the Jockey Club Stakes at Newmarket, but won the 1998 Coronation Cup from Swain at Epsom in June. He remained a consistent performer, though he was well beaten in the 1998 King George VI and Queen Elizabeth Stakes. Aged five, the colt won both the Jockey Club Stakes and the Geoffrey Freer Stakes and came a respectable fourth in the Coronation Cup and King George VI and Queen Elizabeth Stakes. The horse's final race was in Hong Kong in December 1999. He died, aged 15, of natural causes on 11 October 2009 at the National Stud in Newmarket.

== Pedigree ==
Pedigree of Silver Patriarch
Sire Saddlers' Hall	Sadler's Wells	Northern Dancer	Nearctic
Sire Saddlers' Hall	Sadler's Wells	Northern Dancer	Natalma
Sire Saddlers' Hall	Sadler's Wells	Fairy Bridge	Bold Reason
Sire Saddlers' Hall	Sadler's Wells	Fairy Bridge	Special
Sire Saddlers' Hall	Sunny Valley	Val de Loir	Vieux Manoir
Sire Saddlers' Hall	Sunny Valley	Val de Loir	Vali
Sire Saddlers' Hall	Sunny Valley	Sunland	Charlottesville
Sire Saddlers' Hall	Sunny Valley	Sunland	Sunny Gulf
Dam Early Rising	Grey Dawn	Herbager	Vandale
Dam Early Rising	Grey Dawn	Herbager	Flagette
Dam Early Rising	Grey Dawn	Polamia	Mahmoud
Dam Early Rising	Grey Dawn	Polamia	Ampola
Dam Early Rising	Gliding By	Tom Rolfe	Ribot
Dam Early Rising	Gliding By	Tom Rolfe	Pocahontas II
Dam Early Rising	Gliding By	Key Bridge	Princequillo
Dam Early Rising	Gliding By	Key Bridge	Blue Banner
