= 1989 Prix de l'Arc de Triomphe =

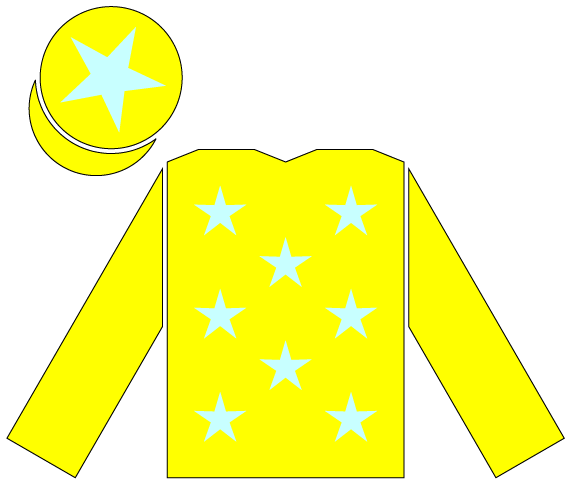
- Location: Longchamp Racecourse
- Date: October 8, 1989
- Winning horse: Carroll House

The 1989 Prix de l'Arc de Triomphe was a horse race held at Longchamp on Sunday 8 October 1989. It was the 68th running of the Prix de l'Arc de Triomphe.

The winner was Carroll House, a four-year-old colt trained in Great Britain by Michael Jarvis. The winning jockey was Michael Kinane.

== Race details ==
- Sponsor: CIGA Hotels
- Purse: 8,500,000 F; First prize: 5,000,000 F
- Going: Good to Soft
- Distance: 2,400 metres
- Number of runners: 19
- Winner's time: 2m 30.8s

== Full result ==
Pos.	Marg.	Horse	Age	Jockey	Trainer (Country)
1		Carroll House	4	Michael Kinane	Michael Jarvis (GB)
2	1½	Behera	3	Alain Lequeux	Alain de Royer-Dupré (FR)
3	snk	Saint Andrews	5	Éric Legrix	Jean-Marie Béguigné (FR)
4	nk	Young Mother	3	Alain Badel	Jean-Marie Béguigné (FR)
5	¾	Sierra Roberta	3	Freddy Head	André Fabre (FR)
6	½	Robore	4	Alfred Gibert	Noël Pelat (FR)
7	1	Norberto	3	Gary W. Moore	Patrick Biancone (FR)
8	¾	Legal Case	3	Frankie Dettori	Luca Cumani (GB)
9	hd	Britannia	4	Richard Quinn	Bruno Schütz (GER)
10	hd	Aliysa	3	Walter Swinburn	Michael Stoute (GB)
11	½	In the Wings	3	Cash Asmussen	André Fabre (FR)
12		Top Class	4	Michael Roberts	Clive Brittain (GB)
13		Mansonnien	5	Gérald Mossé	Jean Lesbordes (FR)
14		Golden Pheasant	3	Tony Cruz	Jonathan Pease (FR)
15		Harvest Time	3	Joel Boisnard	Henri-Alex Pantall (FR)
16		Cacoethes	3	Steve Cauthen	Guy Harwood (GB)
17		Petrullo	4	Guy Guignard	Richard Casey (GB)
18		French Glory	3	Pat Eddery	André Fabre (FR)
19		Star Lift	5	Dominique Boeuf	André Fabre (FR)

- Abbreviations: hd = head; snk = short-neck; nk = neck

== Winner's details ==
Further details of the winner, Carroll House.

- Sex: Colt
- Foaled: 5 March 1985
- Country: Ireland
- Sire: Lord Gayle; Dam: Tuna (Silver Shark)
- Owner: Antonio Balzarini
- Breeder: Mrs Peter Clarke
