= Saddlers' Hall =

Irish-bred Thoroughbred racehorse

- Racing silks of Arnold Weinstock
- Sire: Sadler's Wells
- Grandsire: Northern Dancer
- Dam: Sunny Valley
- Damsire: Val de Loir
- Sex: Stallion
- Foaled: 26 May 1988
- Country: Ireland
- Colour: Bay
- Breeder: Ballymacoll Stud
- Owner: Arnold Weinstock
- Trainer: Michael Stoute
- Record: 15: 6-4-0
- Earnings: £438,833

Major wins
- King Edward VII Stakes (1991); John Porter Stakes (1992); Ormonde Stakes (1992); Coronation Cup (1992); Princess of Wales's Stakes (1992)

Saddlers' Hall (26 May 1988 – 9 April 2008) was an Irish-bred, British-trained Thoroughbred racehorse and sire. After finishing fifth in his only race as a juvenile he developed into a high class staying colt in 1991, winning the King Edward VII Stakes and finishing second the St Leger. He reached his peak in the first half of the following season, winning four consecutive Group races: the John Porter Stakes, Ormonde Stakes, Coronation Cup and Princess of Wales's Stakes. He was retired to stud at the end of the year and had some success as a breeding stallion, siring the St Leger winner Silver Patriarch. He died in 2008 at the age of twenty.

== Background ==
Saddlers' Hall was a bay horse with a white blaze and a white sock on his left hind leg bred in Ireland by the Ballymacoll Stud. He was from the third crop of foals sired by Sadler's Wells, who won the Irish 2,000 Guineas, Eclipse Stakes and Irish Champion Stakes in 1984 went on to be the Champion sire on fourteen occasions. Saddlers' Hall's dam, Sunny Valley, also bred at Ballymacoll, had previously produced the outstanding racemare Sun Princess and was the direct female ancestor of the St Leger winner Millenary and the double Breeders' Cup Turf winner Conduit.

Saddlers Hall raced in the colours of Ballymacoll's owner Arnold Weinstock and was trained throughout his racing career by Michael Stoute at Newmarket, Suffolk. The colt was named after the London base of the Worshipful Company of Saddlers.

== Racing career ==
=== 1990 & 1991: two & three-year-old season ===
On his only appearance as a two-year-old, Saddlers' Hall started 11/10 favourite against ten opponents (including several previous winners) in the Houghton Stakes over seven furlongs at Newmarket Racecourse on 20 October. Ridden by Walter Swinburn he chased the leaders but was unable to accelerate in the closing stages and finished fifth behind Junk Bond.

Saddlers' Hall began his second season by starting 7/4 favourite the May Stakes over ten furlongs at Newmarket on 2 May. Partnered by the veteran Lester Piggott he took the lead approaching the final furlong and won by a neck from Adam Smith. Piggott was again in the saddle when the colt contested the Glasgow Stakes at York Racecourse two weeks later and finished second, beaten six lengths by the Guy Harwood-trained Cruachan. On 18 June at Royal Ascot, Saddlers' Hall was stepped up in class for the Group Two King Edward VII Stakes. Corrupt, who had started joint-favourite for The Derby, headed the betting from the unbeaten Secret Haunt with Saddlers' Hall the 7/1 third choice alongside the French challenger Malmsey and Peking Opera (third in the Chester Vase). Piggott sent the colt into the lead from the start before drawing away in the straight to win "unchallenged" by six lengths from Secret Haunt. Saddlers' Hall was then stepped up to the highest class and matched against older horses for the first time to contest Britain's most prestigious all-aged race, the King George VI & Queen Elizabeth Stakes at Ascot on 27 July. He took the lead after five furlongs and led the field into the straight but was overtaken two furlongs out and faded to finish sixth behind Generous.

In August Saddlers' Hall was dropped in class and started favourite for the Great Voltigeur Stakes at York but was beaten into second place by Corrupt, to whom he was conceding three pounds in weight. In the St Leger at Doncaster Racecourse on 14 September Saddlers' Hall and Corrupt met again and started the 13/2 joint third favourites behind the French-trained Toulon and the undefeated Micheletti. Ridden by John Reid he took the lead three furlongs out and opened up a clear advantage over his rivals but was overtaken by Toulon inside the final furlong and finished second, beaten one and a half lengths. On his final appearance of the season he was sent to the United States for the Breeders' Cup Turf at Churchill Downs on 2 November and made no impact, finishing tenth of the twelve runners behind Miss Alleged.

=== 1992: four-year-old season ===
Saddlers' Hall began his third season in the John Porter Stakes at Newbury Racecourse on 11 April in which he was ridden for the first time by Pat Eddery. Starting the 9/4 favourite in an eleven-runner field he took the lead approaching the final furlong and pulled away to win by ten lengths from Shambo. On 7 May Saddlers' Hall started odds-on the favourite for the Ormonde Stakes at Chester Racecourse and won by ten lengths from Arcadian Heights in a "canter". Swinburn regained the ride when Saddlers' Hall started 5/4 favourite or the Group One Coronation Cup at Epsom Racecourse on 4 June. His eight rivals included Subotica, Rock Hopper (twice winner of the Hardwicke Stakes), Snurge, Terimon and the Stoute stable's pacemaker Mellaby. Saddlers' Hall turned into the straight in fourth place behind Mellaby, took the lead a quarter mile from the finish and held on under strong pressure to win by three quarters of a length from Rock Hopper with Terimon, Subotica and Always Friendly close behind. The win saw him regarded as probably the best middle-distance horse of his time in the United Kingdom. On 7 July Saddlers' Hall recorded his fourth consecutive Group race success when he started odds-on favourite for the Princess of Wales's Stakes at Newmarket and won by three lengths from Luchiroverte with Mashaallah in third. At the end of the month Saddlers' Hall ran for the second time in the King George VI & Queen Elizabeth Stakes in which he was ridden by Willie Carson and started second favourite. He proved no match for the Irish-trained three-year-old St Jovite but stayed on to take second ahead of his stablemate Opera House.

After a break of over two months Saddlers' Hall returned for an autumn campaign but failed to recover his best form. In the Prix de l'Arc de Triomphe on 4 October he led for most of the way but faded badly in the straight and finished fifteenth of the eighteen runners behind Subotica. Two weeks later he was sent to Woodbine Racetrack in Toronto for the Canadian International Stakes and finished fifth behind Snurge.

== Stud record ==
Saddlers' Hall was retired from racing and became a breeding stallion at the Cheveley Park Stud in Newmarket. He joined the Coolmore Stud in 2000 and was sent to Ireland where he was based at the Castlehyde Stud and later moved to Grange Stud. He died of a heart attack when covering a mare on 9 April 2008.

His most successful flat runners were the St Leger winner Silver Patriarch and Endless Hall who won the Gran Premio di Milano and Singapore Airlines International Cup. He also had some success as a sire of National Hunt performers including Teaatral whose victories included the Rendlesham Hurdle and the Grosvenor Casinos Long Distance Hurdle.

== Pedigree ==
Pedigree of Saddlers' Hall (IRE), bay stallion, 1988
Sire Sadler's Wells (USA) 1981	Northern Dancer (CAN); 1961	Nearctic	Nearco
Sire Sadler's Wells (USA) 1981	Northern Dancer (CAN); 1961	Nearctic	Lady Angela
Sire Sadler's Wells (USA) 1981	Northern Dancer (CAN); 1961	Natalma	Native Dancer
Sire Sadler's Wells (USA) 1981	Northern Dancer (CAN); 1961	Natalma	Almahmoud
Sire Sadler's Wells (USA) 1981	Fairy Bridge (USA); 1975	Bold Reason	Hail To Reason
Sire Sadler's Wells (USA) 1981	Fairy Bridge (USA); 1975	Bold Reason	Lalun
Sire Sadler's Wells (USA) 1981	Fairy Bridge (USA); 1975	Special	Forli
Sire Sadler's Wells (USA) 1981	Fairy Bridge (USA); 1975	Special	Thong
Dam Sunny Valley (IRE) 1972	Val de Loir (FR); 1959	Vieux Manoir	Brantôme
Dam Sunny Valley (IRE) 1972	Val de Loir (FR); 1959	Vieux Manoir	Vieille Maison
Dam Sunny Valley (IRE) 1972	Val de Loir (FR); 1959	Vali	Sunny Boy
Dam Sunny Valley (IRE) 1972	Val de Loir (FR); 1959	Vali	Her Slipper
Dam Sunny Valley (IRE) 1972	Sunland (GB); 1965	Charlottesville	Prince Chevalier
Dam Sunny Valley (IRE) 1972	Sunland (GB); 1965	Charlottesville	Noorani
Dam Sunny Valley (IRE) 1972	Sunland (GB); 1965	Sunny Gulf	Persian Gulf
Dam Sunny Valley (IRE) 1972	Sunland (GB); 1965	Sunny Gulf	Solana (Family: 1-l)
