= 1989 Epsom Derby =

- Derby
- Location: Epsom Downs Racecourse
- Date: 7 June 1989
- Winning horse: Nashwan
- Starting price: 5/4 fav
- Jockey: Willie Carson
- Trainer: Dick Hern
- Owner: Hamdan bin Rashid Al Maktoum

Epsom Derby 1989
1-2-3
Nashwan	Terimon	Cacoethes

Also Ran
4-5-6
Ile De Nisky	Mill Pond	Gran Alba
7-8-9
Classic Fame	Torjoun	Flockton's Own
10-11-12
Prince Of Dance	Warrshan	Polar Run

The 1989 Epsom Derby was a horse race which took place at Epsom Downs on Wednesday 7 June 1989. It was the 210th running of the Derby, and it was won by the pre-race favourite Nashwan. The winner was ridden by Willie Carson and trained by Dick Hern.

== Race details ==
- Sponsor: Ever Ready
- Winner's prize money: £296,000
- Going: Good
- Number of runners: 12
- Winner's time: 2m 34.90s

== Full result ==
	*	Horse	Jockey	Trainer ^{†}	SP
1		Nashwan	Willie Carson	Dick Hern	5/4 fav
2	5	Terimon	Michael Roberts	Clive Brittain	500/1
3	2	Cacoethes	Greville Starkey	Guy Harwood	3/1
4	½	Ile de Nisky	George Duffield	Geoff Huffer	20/1
5	2	Mill Pond	Pat Eddery	Patrick Biancone (FR)	16/1
6	2	Gran Alba	Brian Rouse	Richard Hannon, Sr.	80/1
7	6	Classic Fame	John Reid	Vincent O'Brien (IRE)	33/1
8	¾	Torjoun	Ray Cochrane	Luca Cumani	11/1
9	3	Flockton's Own	Richard Hills	J. R. Shaw	500/1
10	hd	Prince of Dance	Steve Cauthen	Dick Hern	11/2
11	15	Warrshan	Walter Swinburn	Michael Stoute	13/1
12	25	Polar Run	Tony Clark	Guy Harwood	250/1

* The distances between the horses are shown in lengths or shorter. hd = head.
† Trainers are based in Great Britain unless indicated.

== Winner's details ==
Further details of the winner, Nashwan:

- Foaled: March 1, 1986, in Kentucky, USA
- Sire: Blushing Groom; Dam: Height of Fashion (Bustino)
- Owner: Hamdan Al Maktoum
- Breeder: Hamdan Al Maktoum
- Rating in 1989 International Classifications: 131

== Form analysis ==
=== Two-year-old races ===
Notable runs by the future Derby participants as two-year-olds in 1988.

- Nashwan – 1st Autumn Stakes
- Terimon – 4th Washington Singer Stakes, 6th Middle Park Stakes
- Cacoethes – 3rd Autumn Stakes
- Gran Alba – 5th Horris Hill Stakes, 3rd Burr Stakes
- Classic Fame – 1st National Stakes, 1st Beresford Stakes
- Prince of Dance – 1st Champagne Stakes, 1st Dewhurst Stakes (dead-heat)
- Polar Run – 2nd Solario Stakes, 4th Futurity Stakes

=== The road to Epsom ===
Early-season appearances in 1989 and trial races prior to running in the Derby.

- Nashwan – 1st 2,000 Guineas
- Terimon – 2nd Thirsk Classic Trial
- Cacoethes – 1st Lingfield Derby Trial
- Gran Alba – 4th Predominate Stakes
- Classic Fame – 5th Irish 2,000 Guineas
- Torjoun – 1st Dante Stakes
- Flockton's Own – 6th Dante Stakes
- Prince of Dance – 1st Newmarket Stakes
- Warrshan – 3rd Chester Vase, 1st Predominate Stakes
- Polar Run – 2nd Warren Stakes

=== Subsequent Group 1 wins ===
Group 1 / Grade I victories after running in the Derby.

- Nashwan – Eclipse Stakes (1989), King George VI and Queen Elizabeth Stakes (1989)
- Terimon – International Stakes (1991)
- Cacoethes – Turf Classic (1990)
- Gran Alba – Christmas Hurdle (1991)

== Subsequent breeding careers ==
Leading progeny of participants in the 1989 Epsom Derby.

=== Sires of Group/Grade One winners ===
Nashwan (1st)

- Swain - Champion Older Horse (1998)
- Bago - Champion Three-year-old Colt (2004)
- Aqaarid - 2nd 1000 Guineas Stakes (1995)
- One So Wonderful - 1st International Stakes (1998)

=== Sires of National Hunt horses ===
Terimon (2nd)

- Scots Grey - 3rd Mildmay of Flete Challenge Cup (2003)
- Roman Ark - 1st Rossington Main Novices' Hurdle (2005)
- Dusty Too - Dam of Simonsig
- Third Party - Dam of Countrywide Flame (1st Fighting Fifth Hurdle 2012), (1st Triumph Hurdle 2012)

=== Other Stallions ===
Warrshan (11th) - Fleet Hill (1st Superlative Stakes 1994 - Dam of dual G3 winner African Dream)
Mill Pond (5th) - Exported to Czech Republic - Kedon (3rd Velká pardubická 2002), Valldemoso (3rd Velká pardubická 2011)
Classic Fame (7th) - Exported to New Zealand - Power And Fame (3rd New Zealand 2000 Guineas 1998)
Gran Alba (6th) - Minor jumps winners
Cacoethes (3rd) - Exported to Japan
Ile de Nisky (4th) - Exported to Saudi Arabia
Torjoun (8th) - Exported to Chile
Flockton's Own (9th) - Sired minor winner
Polar Run (12th) - Exported to Saudi Arabia
