= Cacoethes (horse) =

American-bred Thoroughbred racehorse

- Sire: Alydar
- Grandsire: Raise A Native
- Dam: Careless Notion
- Damsire: Jester
- Sex: Stallion
- Foaled: 7 March 1986
- Country: United States
- Colour: Bay
- Breeder: Fran and Ray Stark
- Owner: Paul H Locke; Lady Harrison
- Trainer: Guy Harwood
- Record: 14: 4-3-3
- Earnings: £311,671

Major wins
- Lingfield Derby Trial (1989); King Edward VII Stakes (1989); Turf Classic (1990)

Cacoethes (7 March 1986–11 September 2009) was an American-bred, British-trained Thoroughbred racehorse and sire. After finishing third on his only start as a two-year-old he improved to become one of the best colts of his generation in Europe in the following year, winning the Lingfield Derby Trial and the King Edward VII Stakes as well as finishing second in the International Stakes and the King George VI and Queen Elizabeth Stakes and third in the Epsom Derby. In 1990 he showed his best form in Autumn when he won the Turf Classic and ran third in the Japan Cup. After his retirement from racing he stood as a breeding stallion in Japan.

== Background ==
Cacoethes was a bay horse with no white markings bred in California by Ray & Fran Stark. As a yearling in September 1987 he was put up for auction at Keeneland and was bought for $225,000 by the bloodstock agent James Delahooke. The colt was sent to Europe and entered training with Guy Harwood at Pulborough. At the time, Harwood was noted for his modern approach to training, introducing Britain to features such as artificial gallops and barn-style stabling. He began his racing career in the ownership of Paul Locke but was acquired by Lady Harrison before the start of his second season.

He was sired by the American stallion Alydar who was best known as a racehorse for his rivalry with the Triple Crown winner Affirmed. He later became a very successful breeding stallion whose other offspring included Easy Goer, Alysheba, Turkoman, Strike the Gold, Criminal Type and Miss Oceana. Cacoethes' dam Careless Notion showed modest ability on the track winning one minor race. She was a daughter of the California Oaks winner Miss Uppity and a distant relative of the Belmont Stakes winner Granville.

== Racing career ==
=== 1988: two-year-old season ===
On his first and only appearance as a juvenile, Cacoethes started at odds of 11/1 for the Listed Autumn Stakes over one mile at Ascot Racecourse on 8 October. Ridden as in most of his early races by Greville Starkey he came home third of the six runners, five and a half lengths behind the winner Nashwan.

=== 1989: three-year-old season ===
Cacoethes made his three-year-old debut in the Prince of Wales Graduation Stakes over ten furlongs at Brighton Racecourse on 24 April and was made the 5/6 favourite against nine opponents. He took the lead before half-way and accelerated away in the last quarter mile to win "very easily" by seven lengths from Dolpour, a colt who later that year was beaten only a head when finishing second in the Champion Stakes. The colt was then stepped up in class and distance for the Group 3 Lingfield Derby Trial over one and a half miles on 13 May and started second choice in the betting behind the undefeated Pirate Army. Cacoethes led from the start and won "easily" by four lengths from Pirate Army with a further eight lengths back to Spitfire in third.

On 7 June Cacoethes started 3/1 second favourite behind Nashwan for the 210th running of the Epsom Derby. After racing in second place behind Torjoun he took the lead in the straight but was quickly joined by Nashwan. Following a brief struggle, the favourite pulled away to win easily while Cacoethes was deprived of second in the closing stages by the 500/1 outsider Terimon. Less than two weeks after his defeat at Epsom, Cacoethes started odds-on favourite for the Group 2 King Edward VII Stakes at Royal Ascot in which he was partnered by Pat Eddery. He was restrained by Eddery in the early stages before going to the front approaching the final furlong and won by three quarters of a length from Zayyani (winner of the Greenham Stakes). Over the same course and distance on 22 July Cacoethes faced Nashwan for the third time in the 39th King George VI and Queen Elizabeth Diamond Stakes. On this occasion the contest was much closer with Cacoethes going down by a neck to his rival after a prolonged struggle up the straight, with the pair finishing seven lengths clear of the other five runners.

Cacoethes was widely expected to win the International Stakes at York Racecourse on 22 August and started at odds of 2/5 against six opponents. In a major upset he failed to overhaul the 16/1 outsider Ile de Chypre and was beaten a length and a half into second place. Steve Cauthen took the ride when Cacoethes contested the Prix de l'Arc de Triomphe. He started second favourite but was never in serious contention and came home towards the rear of the field in a race won by Carroll House.

=== 1990: four-year-old season ===
After the retirement of Starkey, Ray Cochrane took over as Cacoethes' regular jockey in 1994 and rode the colt in all six of his races that year. His season began disappointingly as he finished fourth behind Relief Pitcher when favourite for the Listed Festival Stakes over ten furlongs at Goodwood Racecourse in May. In July he made his second attempt to win the King George VI and Queen Elizabeth Diamond Stakes and started the 11/2 third choice in the betting behind In The Wings and Old Vic. He came home fourth of the eleven runners behind Belmez, keeping on well in the straight without ever looking likely to win.

After a break of over two months Cacoethes returned in the Group 3 Cumberland Lodge Stakes at Ascot in September in which he ran second to Ile de Nisky, beaten half a length when conceding five pounds to the winner. In October Cacoethes was sent to the United States to contest the Grade 1 Turf Classic over one and a half miles at Belmont Park and started 5/2 second favourite behind the Canadian champion With Approval in a six-runner field which also included El Senor (Sword Dancer Stakes), Shy Tom (third in the Travers Stakes), Alwuhush (Premio Presidente della Repubblica) and Fast 'n' Gold (Rutgers Handicap). Cacoethes went to the front from the start and set a steady pace before accelerating clear approaching the final turn. He kept on well in the straight to win by one and a half lengths and a nose from Alwuhush and With Approval in a time of 2:25.0, only 0.2 seconds outside the course record set by Secretariat in 1973. In the Breeders' Cup Turf over the same course and distance three weeks later he failed to reproduce his best form and finished unplaced.

On his final racecourse appearance Cacoethes contested the 10th edition of the Japan Cup at Tokyo Racecourse on 27 November. After tracking the front-runners he went to the front in the straight and opened up a clear lead but was overtaken in the final strides and finished third behind Better Loosen Up and Ode in a three-way photo finish. The unplaced horses included Alwuhush, Belmez, Ibn Bey, Oguri Cap, Petite Ile and Stylish Century.

== Stud record ==
Cacothes spent his career as a breeding stallion in Japan where he sired over 500 winners. The best of his offspring were the local Grade 1 winners Concert Boy (Teio Sho) and Esprit Thes (Kawasaki Kinen). Cacoethes died of a heart attack on 11 September 2009.

== Pedigree ==
Pedigree of Cacoethes (USA), bay stallion, 1986
Sire Alydar (USA) 1975	Raise A Native (USA); 1961	Native Dancer	Polynesian
Sire Alydar (USA) 1975	Raise A Native (USA); 1961	Native Dancer	Geisha
Sire Alydar (USA) 1975	Raise A Native (USA); 1961	Raise You	Case Ace
Sire Alydar (USA) 1975	Raise A Native (USA); 1961	Raise You	Lady Glory
Sire Alydar (USA) 1975	Sweet Tooth (USA); 1965	On-and-On	Nasrullah (GB)
Sire Alydar (USA) 1975	Sweet Tooth (USA); 1965	On-and-On	Two Lea
Sire Alydar (USA) 1975	Sweet Tooth (USA); 1965	Plum Cake	Ponder
Sire Alydar (USA) 1975	Sweet Tooth (USA); 1965	Plum Cake	Real Delight
Dam Careless Notion (USA) 1970	Jester (USA); 1955	Tom Fool	Menow
Dam Careless Notion (USA) 1970	Jester (USA); 1955	Tom Fool	Gaga
Dam Careless Notion (USA) 1970	Jester (USA); 1955	Golden Apple	Eight Thirty
Dam Careless Notion (USA) 1970	Jester (USA); 1955	Golden Apple	Thorn Apple
Dam Careless Notion (USA) 1970	Miss Uppity (USA); 1956	Nasrullah (GB)	Nearco (ITY)
Dam Careless Notion (USA) 1970	Miss Uppity (USA); 1956	Nasrullah (GB)	Mumtaz Begum (FR)
Dam Careless Notion (USA) 1970	Miss Uppity (USA); 1956	Nursery School	Count Gallahad
Dam Careless Notion (USA) 1970	Miss Uppity (USA); 1956	Nursery School	Kindergarten (Family: 2-e)

- Cacoethes was inbred 3 × 4 to Nasrullah meaning that this stallion appears in both the third and fourth generations of his pedigree.
