= Scottish Derby =

- Class: Group 2
- Location: Ayr Racecourse; Ayr, Scotland
- Inaugurated: 1979
- Final run: 18 July 2005
- Race type: Flat / Thoroughbred
- Website: Ayr

Race information
- Distance: 1m 2f (2,012 metres)
- Surface: Turf
- Track: Left-handed
- Qualification: Three-years-old and up
- Weight: 8 st 6 lb (3yo); 9 st 2 lb (4yo+); Allowances; 3 lb for fillies and mares Penalties; 6 lb for Group 1 winners * 3 lb for Group 2 winners * * since 1 September last year (2yo wins not penalised)
- Purse: £100,000 (2005); 1st: £58,000

The Scottish Derby was a Group 2 flat horse race in Great Britain open to thoroughbreds aged three years or older. It was run at Ayr over a distance of 1 mile and 2 furlongs (2,012 metres), and it was scheduled to take place each year in July.

== History ==
The event was established in 1979, and it was initially restricted to three-year-olds. The first edition was contested over 1 mile and 5 furlongs. It was shortened by two furlongs in 1980. It was cut by another furlong and opened to older horses in 1987.

The race was originally known as the Scottish Derby, but it was renamed the Scottish Classic in 1988. For a period it held Group 3 status. It reverted to its former title and was promoted to Group 2 level in 2003.

The Scottish Derby was last run in 2005. It was replaced the following year by a similar race, the York Stakes at York.

Over the course of twenty-seven runnings the event had several different sponsors. These included Mecca Bookmakers, Tennent's and the Daily Record.

== Records ==
Most successful horse:

- no horse won this race more than once

Leading jockey (4 wins):

- Kieren Fallon – Winter Romance (1998), Carnival Dancer (2001), Princely Venture (2003), Kalaman (2004)

Leading trainer (6 wins):

- Sir Michael Stoute – Dazari (1983), Ascot Knight (1987), Carnival Dancer (2001), Princely Venture (2003), Kalaman (2004), Imperial Stride (2005)

== Winners ==
Year	Winner	Age	Jockey	Trainer	Time
1979	Serge Lifar	3	Brian Taylor	Ryan Price	2:53.41
1980	Prince Roland	3	Steve Cauthen	Barry Hills	2:22.67
1981	Little Wolf	3	Graham Sexton	Dick Hern	2:23.02
1982	Jalmood	3	Steve Cauthen	John Dunlop	2:20.54
1983	Dazari	3	Walter Swinburn	Michael Stoute	2:18.61
1984	Raami	3	Tony Ives	Bill O'Gorman	2:18.40
1985	Eagling	3	Paul Eddery	Henry Cecil	2:23.76
1986	Moon Madness	3	Tony Ives	John Dunlop	2:19.67
1987	Ascot Knight	3	Walter Swinburn	Michael Stoute	2:08.62
1988	Kefaah	3	Ray Cochrane	Luca Cumani	2:06.71
1989	Scenic	3	Michael Hills	Barry Hills	2:07.88
1990	Husyan	4	Willie Carson	Peter Walwyn	2:08.01
1991	Zoman	4	Alan Munro	Paul Cole	2:07.18
1992	Sharpitor	3	John Reid	William Jarvis	2:06.03
1993	River North	3	Kevin Darley	Lady Herries	2:08.12
1994	Beneficial	4	Michael Hills	Geoff Wragg	2:05.66
1995	Baron Ferdinand	5	Kevin Darley	Roger Charlton	2:08.28
1996	Montjoy	4	Richard Quinn	Paul Cole	2:10.07
1997	Crystal Hearted	3	Tony McGlone	Henry Candy	2:09.26
1998	Winter Romance	5	Kieren Fallon	Ed Dunlop	2:12.79
1999	Prolix	4	Richard Hughes	Barry Hills	2:13.01
2000	Endless Hall	4	Jamie Spencer	Luca Cumani	2:04.02
2001	Carnival Dancer	3	Kieren Fallon	Sir Michael Stoute	2:10.61
2002	Imperial Dancer	4	Chris Catlin	Mick Channon	2:09.91
2003	Princely Venture	4	Kieren Fallon	Sir Michael Stoute	2:07.46
2004	Kalaman ^{[a]}	4	Kieren Fallon	Sir Michael Stoute	2:04.90
2005	Imperial Stride	4	Richard Hills	Sir Michael Stoute	2:06.08

^{a} The 2004 winner Kalaman was later exported to Hong Kong and renamed Oriental Magic.

== See also ==
- Horse racing in Great Britain
- Horse racing in Scotland
- List of British flat horse races
