= Carroll House =

Irish-bred Thoroughbred racehorse

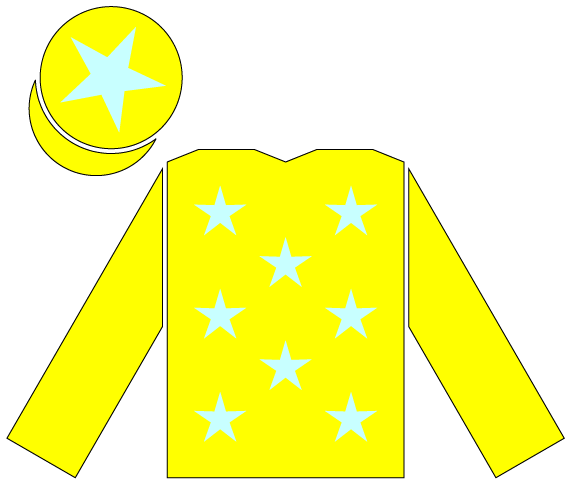
- Racing colours of Antonio Balzarini
- Sire: Lord Gayle
- Grandsire: Sir Gaylord
- Dam: Tuna
- Damsire: Silver Shark
- Sex: Stallion
- Foaled: 5 March 1985
- Country: Ireland
- Colour: Chestnut
- Breeder: P Clarke
- Owner: Gerald Carroll; Antonio Balzarini; Zenya Yoshida
- Trainer: Michael Jarvis
- Record: 20: 7-1-6

Major wins
- Welsh Derby (1988); Furstenberg Rennen (1988); Grosser Preis von Baden (1988); Princess of Wales's Stakes (1989); Phoenix Champion Stakes (1989); Prix de l'Arc de Triomphe (1989)

Carroll House (5 March 1985 – 8 February 2008) was an Irish-bred, British-trained Thoroughbred racehorse and sire. In a racing career which lasted from September 1987 until July 1990 he raced twenty times in six countries and won seven races. His most important win came in October 1989 when he won the Prix de l'Arc de Triomphe in Paris. His other wins included the Phoenix Champion Stakes, Grosser Preis von Baden, Princess of Wales's Stakes, Furstenberg Rennen and Welsh Derby. At the end of his racing career he was retired to become a breeding stallion in Japan and Ireland but had little success as a sire of winners.

== Background ==
Carroll House was a chestnut colt with a white star bred in Ireland by Mrs P Clarke. He was sired by Lord Gayle, an American-bred stallion who won the Prix Perth in 1970. Lord Gayle's other winning progeny included Blue Wind (Epsom Oaks), Desirable, Gay Lemur (Jockey Club Stakes) and the leading hurdler Pollardstown. Carroll House's dam Tuna, was of little use as a racehorse, but produced several winners including the successful handicappers Brother Kempinski and Jean-Claude.

Carroll House was sent to the sales as a foal and was sold for 15,000 guineas. A year later he was sold again for 32,000 guineas and entered the ownership of Anglo-Irish businessman Gerald Carroll. He was sent to be trained at Newmarket, Suffolk by Michael Jarvis.

== Racing career ==
=== 1987: two-year-old season ===
Carroll House made his first racecourse appearance at Newmarket in September 1987. He looked very immature but showed promise to finish fourth. Three weeks later he recorded his first win when he defeated seventeen opponents in a maiden race over one mile at Newbury Racecourse. Timeform commented "will stay 1¼m: sure to win more races, and is probably useful 3-y-o in the making".

=== 1988: three-year-old season ===
As a three-year-old, Carroll House was ridden in all but one of his races by the jockey Bruce Raymond. In the spring he finished third in both the Feilden Stakes at Newmarket and the Prix Hocquart at Longchamp Racecourse before being sent to Italy to contest the Derby Italiano over 2400 metres at Capannelle Racecourse in Rome. Racing on soft ground he was beaten a short head by the locally trained Tisserand six length clear of the rest of the field. Following this race, Carroll House was bought by the Italian Antonio Balzarini.

Carroll House returned to the United Kingdom in July for the Welsh Derby at Chepstow Racecourse and won by one and a half lengths from Golden Wave. Ten days later he appeared in Germany, where he finished first in the Group One Grosser Preis von Berlin at Düsseldorf but was relegated to third place by the local stewards. On 28 August Carroll House returned to Germany and won the Group Three Fürstenberg-Rennen at Baden-Baden by one and a half lengths. A week later at the same course, the colt contested Germany's most important weight-for-age race, the Grosser Preis von Baden over 2400 metres. Racing on very soft ground he won by three and a half lengths from the five-year-old Helikon, with the French-trained Boyatino in third. Carroll House competed in Italy in the autumn of 1988, but failed to win, finishing third to Roakarad in the Gran Premio del Jockey Club in Milan and fourth behind Welsh Guide in the Premio Roma.

=== 1989: four-year-old season ===
On his first appearance as a four-year-old, Carroll House ran in England for the first time in over a year when he started a 33/1 outsider for the Gordon Richards Stakes over ten furlongs at Sandown Park Racecourse. Ridden for the first time by Walter Swinburn he took the lead two furlongs from the finish and maintained his advantage until the final strides when he was caught and beaten in a three-way photo-finish by Indian Skimmer and Per Quod. Three weeks later he appeared at the Curragh Racecourse in Ireland where he carried top weight of 130 pounds in the Tattersalls Gold Cup and finished third to Ile de Chypre.

In July, Carroll House was matched against the Hardwicke Stakes winner Assatis in the Princess of Wales's Stakes over one and a half miles at Newmarket. Swinburn sent the colt into the lead three furlongs from the finish and Carroll House held off the challenge of Assatis to win by a neck, with the future St Leger winner Michelozzo in third. Eleven days later, Carroll House contested Britain's most prestigious weight-for-age race, the King George VI and Queen Elizabeth Stakes at Ascot Racecourse. Racing on unsuitably firm ground, he started a 33/1 outsider and finished fifth of the seven runners behind Nashwan, Cacoethes, Top Class and Sheriff's Star.

On 2 September, Carroll House was moved down in distance for the Group One Phoenix Champion Stakes over ten furlongs at Phoenix Park Racecourse in Dublin. Ridden by Mick Kinane, the colt raced just behind the leaders before making a sustained challenge in the straight. He took the lead inside the final furlong and won by three-quarters of a lengths from the Henry Cecil-trained three-year-old Citidancer. Five weeks later Carroll House was one of nineteen horses to contest the 68th running of France's premier flat race, the Prix de l'Arc de Triomphe over 2400 metres at Longchamp. The undefeated three-year-old In The Wings started favourite ahead of Cacoethes, Saint Andrews, Young Mother and Behera, with Carroll House, ridden again by Kinane starting at odds of 18.9/1. Carroll House raced just behind the leaders on the wide outside of the field, turning into the straight in fourth place. He overtook Saint Andrews 200 metres from the finish and won by one and a half lengths from Behera. Following his win in the Arc, Carroll House was sold to the Japanese breeder Zenya Yoshida, owner of the Shadai Stallion Station. On his final appearance of the year he ran on unsuitably firm ground in the Japan Cup at Tokyo Racecourse on 26 November. He finished unplaced behind the New Zealand-bred mare Horlicks.

=== 1990: five-year-old season ===
Carroll House remained in training as a five-year-old but failed to reproduce his previous form in two races. Jarvis struggled to bring the horse to full fitness as the ground at Newmarket was unusually firm. He finished last of the seven runners behind Assatis in the Hardwicke Stakes, and fourth to In The Wings in the Grand Prix de Saint-Cloud. In the latter race he sustained an injury which ended his racing career.

== Assessment ==
In their book, A Century of Champions, based on the Timeform rating system, John Randall and Tony Morris rated Carroll House an "inferior" winner of the Prix de l'Arc de Triomphe.

== Stud record ==
Carroll House began his stud career in Japan in 1991. He was later returned to Europe in October 1996 where he stood as a breeding stallion in Ireland at the Sunnyhill Stud in County Kildare and the Garryrichard Stud in County Wexford. He had little success as a sire of flat race horses, but did have more success with his National Hunt horses including Roll Along the winner of the 2008 United House Gold Cup.

== Pedigree ==
Pedigree of Carroll House (IRE), chestnut stallion, 1985
Sire Lord Gayle (USA) 1965	Sir Gaylord (USA); 1959	Turn-To	Royal Charger
Sire Lord Gayle (USA) 1965	Sir Gaylord (USA); 1959	Turn-To	Source Sucree
Sire Lord Gayle (USA) 1965	Sir Gaylord (USA); 1959	Somethingroyal	Princequillo
Sire Lord Gayle (USA) 1965	Sir Gaylord (USA); 1959	Somethingroyal	Imperatrice
Sire Lord Gayle (USA) 1965	Sticky Case (GB); 1958	Court Martial	Fair Trial
Sire Lord Gayle (USA) 1965	Sticky Case (GB); 1958	Court Martial	Instantaneous
Sire Lord Gayle (USA) 1965	Sticky Case (GB); 1958	Run Honey	Hyperion
Sire Lord Gayle (USA) 1965	Sticky Case (GB); 1958	Run Honey	Honey Buzzard
Dam Tuna (GB) 1969	Silver Shark (GB); 1963	Buisson Ardent	Relic
Dam Tuna (GB) 1969	Silver Shark (GB); 1963	Buisson Ardent	Rose o'Lynn
Dam Tuna (GB) 1969	Silver Shark (GB); 1963	Palsaka	Palestine
Dam Tuna (GB) 1969	Silver Shark (GB); 1963	Palsaka	Masaka
Dam Tuna (GB) 1969	Vimelette (GB); 1960	Vimy	Wild Risk
Dam Tuna (GB) 1969	Vimelette (GB); 1960	Vimy	Mimi
Dam Tuna (GB) 1969	Vimelette (GB); 1960	Sea Parrot	Ocean Swell
Dam Tuna (GB) 1969	Vimelette (GB); 1960	Sea Parrot	Precious Polly (Family:14-c)
