= Malathaat =

American racehorse

- Sire: Curlin
- Grandsire: Smart Strike
- Dam: Dreaming of Julia
- Damsire: A.P. Indy
- Sex: Mare
- Foaled: March 7, 2018 (age 7)
- Country: United States
- Color: Bay
- Breeder: Stonestreet Thoroughbred Holdings
- Owner: Shadwell Stable
- Trainer: Todd Pletcher
- Record: 14: 10-3-1
- Earnings: $3,790,825

Major wins
- Demoiselle Stakes (2020); Ashland Stakes (2021); Kentucky Oaks (2021); Alabama Stakes (2021); Doubledogdare Stakes (2022); Personal Ensign Stakes (2022); Spinster Stakes (2022); Breeders' Cup; Breeders' Cup Distaff (2022)

Awards
- American Champion Three-Year-Old Filly (2021); American Champion Older Dirt Female Horse (2022)
- Last updated on January 27, 2023

Malathaat (foaled March 7, 2018) is a Champion American Thoroughbred racehorse. She was named the American Champion Three-Year-Old Filly of 2021 after winning the Ashland Stakes, Kentucky Oaks and Alabama Stakes. In 2022, she was named American Champion Older Dirt Female Horse after winning the Personal Ensign, Spinster Stakes and Breeders' Cup Distaff. She also won the Tempted and Demoiselle Stakes at age two.

== Background ==
Malathaat is a bay mare who was bred in Kentucky by Stonestreet Stables. She was sired by Curlin, who was the two-time American Horse of the Year. Curlin was known for his class – the ability to carry his speed over classic distances – with wins including the 2007 Preakness Stakes, 2007 Breeders' Cup Classic and 2008 Dubai World Cup. Since retiring to stud, he has finished in the top ten on the North American sire list several times, including second-place finishes in 2016 and 2019. His most notable progeny, including Exaggerator, Palace Malice, Stellar Wind and Vino Rosso, are also known for their stamina. Malathaat's dam was Grade I winner, Dreaming of Julia, by A.P. Indy.

Malathaat was sold at the Keeneland 2019 yearling sale for $1,050,000. She was purchased by Shadwell Stables, originally owned by Sheikh Hamdan bin Rashid Al Maktoum. Since his death in March 2021, the stable is run by his daughter Sheikha Hissa. Malathaat is trained by Todd Pletcher.

== Racing career ==
=== 2020: two-year-old season ===
Malathaat made her debut on October 9, 2020, in a maiden special weight at Belmont Park. She went off as the odds-on favorite in a field of six based on her pedigree and outstanding workouts. She vied for the early lead with Well Kept Secret, took the lead after half a mile, then pulled away in the stretch to win by 1 3/4 lengths. The performance earned her the "TDN Rising Star" designation from the Thoroughbred Daily News.

Malathaat made her next start in the Listed Tempted Stakes at Aqueduct on November 6. She went to the early lead and set moderate fractions of :24.15 for the quarter-mile and :48.28. Turning for home, she began to widen her lead, winning by 7 3/4 lengths.

She made her final start of the year in the Grade 2 Demoiselle Stakes at Aqueduct on December 5. She broke slowly and settled in the middle of a tightly bunched field, getting bumped a few times. Turning into the stretch, she swung out wide and began to close ground. Still 3 1/2 lengths behind with a furlong remaining, she rallied in the final strides to win by three-quarters of a length. Malathaat became the third member of her family to win the Demoiselle, following her dam, Dreaming of Julia, and granddam, Dream Rush. Pletcher noted that the filly had faced her first major challenge after easily winning her first two starts. "(Today) she was on and off the bridle and a little bit green," he said, "and there was a little bit of traffic, but in the end, she found more and showed the quality filly that she is."

=== 2021: three-year-old season ===
Malathaat was originally scheduled to make her three-year-old debut in the Gulfstream Park Oaks on March 27. However Sheikh Hamdan died on March 24 and her remaining connections honored his wishes not to run any of their horses during the 10-day mourning period. She instead made her first start of the year in the Ashland Stakes at Keeneland on April 3, 2021. She went off as the favorite in a field of six that also included Grade I winner Simply Ravishing and Grade III winner Will's Secret. She chased the early pace set by Simply Ravishing, then swung four wide as they turned into the stretch. At the same time, Simply Ravishing tired and eventually finished last, while Pass the Champagne took over the lead, widening to two lengths in midstretch. Under a sustained drive, Malathaat gradually closed ground and won by a head over Pass the Champagne.

Malathaat's next start was in the Kentucky Oaks on April 30 at Churchill Downs. She went off as the 5-2 favorite in the field of 13 that also featured Travel Column (Fair Ground Oaks) and Search Results (Gazelle Stakes). Malathaat broke slowly from an outside post and was bumped a few times going into the first turn, where she settled into fifth place while racing four wide. Travel Column set a moderate early pace, completing the first half mile in :47.47 and the three-quarters in 1:11.31. Travel Column then dropped back as Search Results moved to the lead along the rail and Malathaat started her move on the outside. Malathaat took a narrow lead in midstretch. Search Results fought back and the two matched strides for the final furlong, with Malathaat winning by a neck. Jockey John Velazquez said that despite the poor start, he found a good spot to stalk the pace. "She was running well and when I turned for home, I had a target [Search Results] to send her after", he said. "We got up next to her and my filly went by. Then she waited a bit; she does that. The other filly came back, but I could tell I was still in control. I never thought I was going to do anything but win."

Malathaat's next start was in the Coaching Club American Oaks where she was on the losing end of a stretch duel with longshot Maracuja, falling a head short and spoiling her undefeated record. She went to the early lead, then was challenged down the backstretch and final turn by Clairiere. Malathaat responded to that challenge but could not hold off Maracuja in the final strides. "She fought", said Pletcher. "It was a race on paper that didn't have much speed and you have a target on your back so we elected to go ahead and put her in the race and they went a little quick. Just when I thought she would get a breather, [Irad Ortiz on Clairiere] was on top of her and she had to keep fighting. I thought she put in a game effort and hadn't run in a while so hopefully this will move her forward."

On August 21, Malathaat went off as the odds on favorite in the Alabama Stakes at Saratogo. After stumbling at the break, she settled behind a slow early pace before starting her move on the final turn. She took the lead at the eighth pole and overtook Army Wife drew away, winning by 1 1/2 lengths in a time of 2:02.59. "With the exception of the stumble at the start, I felt pretty good the whole way", said Pletcher. "She recovered and got into a good position. She was in the clear. The thing we wanted today was to allow her to run her race and get into that big stride she has and a comfortable rhythm and keep coming."

Pletcher decided to train Malathaat up to the Breeders' Cup Distaff, held on November 6 at Del Mar in California. The top quality field also included Letruska, the top-ranked older mare in the country with four Grade I wins, Shedaresthedevil (Clement L. Hirsch), Clairiere (Cotillion) and longshot Marche Lorraine from Japan. Another longshot, Private Mission, went to the early lead and set a blistering pace of :21.84 for the first quarter and :44.97 for the first half. Private Mission held the lead for the first three-quarters until she tired, eventually finishing last. Letruska, who had tried to stay with the pace, also tired turning into the stretch and finished tenth. Meanwhile, Malathaat, Dunbar Road and Marche Lorraine had all raced close together well back from the early leaders. They started their moves around the final turn, with March Lorraine moving fastest on the outside. Marche Lorraine opened up a two length lead in midstretch before Malathaat and Dunbar Road started closing ground, bumping twice with each other. At the wire, Marche Lorraine held on to win by a nose over Dunbar Road, with Malathaat a half length behind in third.

Despite the loss, Malathaat was named the American Champion Three-Year-Old Filly.

=== 2022: four-year-old season ===
In her 4-year-old season opener on April 22, 2022, at Keeneland, Malathaat delivered a hard-fought victory in Doubledogdare Stakes, a 1 1/16-mile test for older fillies and mares. She ran wide around both turns, then moved to first in the stretch while running on the wrong lead. She seemed to lose focus but responded to urging to win by three-quarters of a length over last year's Doubledogdare winner, Bonny South, in a time 1:44.58. Malathaat earned her fifth graded stakes win overall. "Down the lane I went to make her switch her lead and she got lost looking for the field," said Velazquez. "Then the other horse got to her and she went on again, so it was very nice. We know when she gets to the lead she starts waiting, so it was a good comeback for her."

On June 11, Malathaat faced Letruska and Clairiere in the Ogden Phipps Stakes at Belmont Park. In the stretch, the race came down to Malathaat and Clairiere as Letruska was eased due to the torrid early pace. Malathaat hit the front half-way down the stretch run but Clairiere prevailed by a head in an excellent time of 1:41.10 for the 1 1/16 miles event. Velazquez said, "She kinda lost focus in the last sixteenth of a mile" with Pletcher adding, "It's probably time to think about some blinkers, which we had in the back of our minds. She's always been one who is curious and looks around. Johnny said she saw something the last 100 yards and came off the bridle. Still, it was a big effort."

In her next start on July 24 in the Shuvee Stakes at Saratoga, Malathaat again faced Clairiere and again ended up short, this time by 1 1/2 lengths in a time of 1:51.96 on a track labeled fast. Pletcher said he had a feeling something was amiss when Malathaat came into the paddock to be saddled. "When she came in, she was super quiet," he said. "I don't know if she reacted adversely to the heat [the temperature was 92 °F (33 °C)]. Normally, she is a very classy mare. She was dull and she seemed to stay dull in the post parade. A very dull performance all the way around."

On August 27 in the Personal Ensign Stakes, Malathaat faced Clairiere, Letruska and Search Results in a small field of five. Clairiere broke poorly and was never a factor. Letruska set the early pace, pressed by Search Results with Malathaat a few lengths behind. Turning into the stretch, Search Results took the lead. Malathaat was still in third with a furlong remaining, but closed steadily to win by half a length. "All due respect to the entire field," said Pletcher, "we always feel that when she shows up and runs her 'A' race, she is the top 4-year-old filly in the country. She showed that today."

Malathaat made her next start on October 9 in the Spinster Stakes at Keeneland, going off as the heavy 2-5 favorite in a field of five. She settled in fourth behind Letruska, then made a three-wide move on the final turn and quickly opened up a lead entering the stretch. She continued to draw away under mild urging to win by 5 1/4 lengths. "Malathaat kept running today", said Velazquez. "Normally when she gets to the lead she slows down, and she did, but at the same time she was running a little bit. Right at the wire, she [moved sideways] and she almost left me at the wire. But she was much the best today."

Malathaat made her final start in the Breeders' Cup Distaff at Keeneland on November 5. The race was one of the most anticipated of the year, with the top-ranked older fillies and mares Malathaat, Clairiere and Search Results facing off with the leading three-year-old fillies Nest, Society and Secret Oath – all Grade I winners. Pletcher was also the trainer of Nest, who went off as the favorite, and had mixed emotions. "For me, I love both fillies so much and hate to run them against each other", he said. "It's going to be kind of bittersweet no matter what the result is if one beats the other. But at the same time, we're hoping one of them can get it done."

Society went to the early lead, running the first quarter in :23.09 and the half in :47.29. Malathaat rated near the back of the pack, which was tightly bunched going into the final turn. Secret Oath was the first to make her move, taking the lead turning into the stretch before tiring somewhat to finish fifth. In the final furlong, Blue Stripe (a longshot despite having won the G1 Clement L Hirsch in her previous start) split between horses and inched her way to the front, with Clairiere also closing ground along the rail. On the outside, Malathaat found her stride and pulled alongside in the final strides. At the finish line, it was a three-way photo finish with Malathaat winning by a nose over Blue Stripe with Clairiere a head back in third.

It was the sixth time that Malathaat had won by less than a length, in addition to three narrow defeats. "She can be a little tricky," Pletcher said. "She needs a little while to get revved up and you can't make the lead too soon with her, but I told [Velazquez] that’s timing it a little too close for my liking. I could see she had a head of steam built up. She was motoring down the middle of the track. I was just hoping she had enough time to get there." Velazquez explained that Malathaat had lost her momentum at the top of the stretch when a tiring horse, Awake at Midnyte, stopped in front of them. "[Blue Stripe] pulled out of there and it took me a long time to get into a rhythm again," he said. "At the wire I thought I got it, but it was so close I didn't want to jinx myself."

Malathaat was retired shortly after the Distaff. The top-ranked older filly or mare in the country going into the race, Malathaat is expected to earn her second Eclipse Award.

== Statistics ==
Date	Distance	Race	Grade	Track	Odds	Field	Finish	Winning Time	Winning (Losing) Margin	Jockey	Ref
2020 – Two-year-old season
Oct 9, 2020	7 furlongs	Maiden special weight		Belmont Park	0.85*	6	1	1:23.37	1 3/4 lengths	John Velazquez	
Nov 6, 2020	1 mile	Tempted Stakes	Listed	Aqueduct	1.00*	5	1	1:40.35	7 3/4 lengths	Kendrick Carmouche	
Dec 5, 2020	1 1/8 miles	Demoiselle Stakes	II	Aqueduct	0.45*	6	1	1:52.36	3/4 lengths	John Velazquez	
2021 – Three-year-old season
Apr 3, 2021	1 1/16 miles	Ashland Stakes	I	Keeneland	1.50	6	1	1:42.94	Head	Joel Rosario	
Apr 30, 2021	1 1/8 miles	Kentucky Oaks	I	Churchill Downs	2.50*	13	1	1:48.99	Neck	John Velazquez	
Jul 22, 2021	1 1/8 miles	Coaching Club American Oaks	I	Saratoga	0.30*	4	2	1:49.29	(Head)	John Velazquez	
Aug 21, 2021	1 1/4 miles	Alabama Stakes	I	Saratoga	0.55*	7	1	2:02.59	1 1/2 lengths	John Velazquez	
Nov 6, 2021	1 1/8 miles	Breeders' Cup Distaff	I	Del Mar	3.60	11	3	1:47.67	(1/2 length)	John Velazquez	
2022 – Four-year-old season
Apr 22, 2022	1 1/16 miles	Doubledogdare Stakes	III	Keeneland	0.30*	6	1	1:44.58	3/4 length	John Velazquez	
Jun 11, 2022	1 1/16 miles	Ogden Phipps Stakes	I	Belmont Park	3.15	5	2	1:41.10	(Head)	John Velazquez	
Jul 24, 2022	1 1/8 miles	Shuvee Stakes	II	Saratoga	0.60*	4	2	1:51.96	(1 1/2 lengths)	John Velazquez	
Aug 27, 2022	1 1/8 miles	Personal Ensign Stakes	I	Saratoga	3.20	5	1	1:48.30	1/2 length	John Velazquez	
Oct 9, 2022	1 1/8 miles	Spinster Stakes	I	Keeneland	0.44*	5	1	1:51.05	5 1/4 lengths	John Velazquez	
Nov 5, 2022	1 1/8 miles	Breeders' Cup Distaff	I	Keeneland	2.88	8	1	1:49.07	nose	John Velazquez	

An asterisk after the odds means Malathaat was the post-time favorite

== Pedigree ==
Pedigree of Malathaat, bay filly, March 7, 2018
Sire Curlin	Smart Strike	Mr. Prospector	Raise a Native
Sire Curlin	Smart Strike	Mr. Prospector	Gold Digger
Sire Curlin	Smart Strike	Classy 'n Smart	Smarten
Sire Curlin	Smart Strike	Classy 'n Smart	No Class
Sire Curlin	Sherriff's Deputy	Deputy Minister	Vice Regent
Sire Curlin	Sherriff's Deputy	Deputy Minister	Mint Copy
Sire Curlin	Sherriff's Deputy	Barbarika	Bates Motel
Sire Curlin	Sherriff's Deputy	Barbarika	War Exchange
Dam Dreaming of Julia	A.P. Indy	Seattle Slew	Bold Reasoning
Dam Dreaming of Julia	A.P. Indy	Seattle Slew	My Charmer
Dam Dreaming of Julia	A.P. Indy	Weekend Surprise	Secretariat
Dam Dreaming of Julia	A.P. Indy	Weekend Surprise	Lassie Dear
Dam Dreaming of Julia	Dream Rush	Wild Rush	Wild Again
Dam Dreaming of Julia	Dream Rush	Wild Rush	Rose Park
Dam Dreaming of Julia	Dream Rush	Turbo Dream	Unbridled
Dam Dreaming of Julia	Dream Rush	Turbo Dream	Reve de Fee (family 1-n)
