= Secret Oath =

American-bred Thoroughbred racehorse

- Sire: Arrogate
- Grandsire: Unbridled's Song
- Dam: Absinthe Minded
- Damsire: Quiet American
- Sex: Mare
- Foaled: March 20, 2019 (age 7)
- Country: United States
- Color: Chestnut
- Breeder: Briland Farm, Robert Mitchell & Stacy Mitchell
- Owner: Briland Farm
- Trainer: D. Wayne Lukas
- Record: 18: 6-5-3
- Earnings: $2,444,767

Major wins
- Martha Washington Stakes (2022); Honeybee Stakes (2022); Kentucky Oaks (2022); Azeri Stakes (2023)
- Last updated on 26 August 2023

Secret Oath (foaled March 20, 2019) is a retired American Thoroughbred racehorse who won the 2022 Kentucky Oaks. She also won the Martha Washington Stakes and Honeybee Stakes and finished third against males in the Arkansas Derby.

== Background ==
Secret Oath is a chestnut mare, bred in Kentucky by Brilard Farms, which is owned and operated by Robert and Stacy Mitchell. She was sired by Arrogate, the 2016 American Champion three-year-old colt, in his first year at stud. Her dam Absinthe Minded, by Quiet American, was a multiple stakes winner. The Mitchell's chose the mating to create a "reverse sex cross" (a form of inbreeding) on the stallion Intentionally, through his son In Reality (who appears twice in Arrogate's pedigree) and daughter Ta Wee (who appears in Absinthe Minded's pedigree).

The Mitchell's originally planned to sell Secret Oath at the 2020 Keeneland yearling sale, but withdrew her before bidding began due to lack of interest. She therefore races for Brilard Farms as a homebred. She is trained by D. Wayne Lukas, once one of the most dominant trainers in North America with an outstanding record in the American Classics in the 1980s and 1990s. His stable has since reduced to 25 horses. "We didn't start out with six fillies like this one", said Lukas. "We started out with one. We're probably beating the odds that an old man like me with a one-horse stable could take this to the next level."

== Racing career ==
=== 2021: two-year-old season ===
Secret Oath made her first start on October 3, 2021, in a maiden special weight race at Churchill Downs. Racing along the rail, she was close to the early leader but ran into traffic problems as the field entered the stretch. She fell back to fifth place while moving to the outside, then stayed on to finish third.

She made her next start on October 31, again at Churchill Downs, in a maiden special weight race at a distance of 1 1/16 miles. She stalked the early pace while racing three-wide around the first turn, then started her move on the far turn. She drew clear in the stretch and won by 5 1/4 lengths.

On November 27, Secret Oath made her first stakes appearance in the Golden Rod Stakes at Churchill Downs. She tracked the early pace while racing on the outside, then made a bid for the lead on the far turn. She tired in the stretch though and finished fifth, 11 1/4 lengths behind the winner, Dream Lith.

She made her final start as a two-year-old in an allowance rate at Oaklawn Park. Instead of pressing the pace as in her earlier starts, she rated towards the back of the pack while racing on the inside. She then shifted to the outside and started to close ground on the final turn. She took the lead in midstretch and continued to draw away, winning by 8 1/4 lengths.

=== 2022: three-year-old season ===
Secret Oath made her three-year-old debut on January 29, 2022, in the Martha Washington Stakes at Oaklawn Park, where she went off as the 1-2 favorite. She was carried wide around the first turn as she tried to chase the early leader. She then settled into fourth place down the backstretch and started her move midway through the final turn. She took the lead as they entered the stretch and pulled away to win by 7 1/4 lengths. "I just tried to keep her covered as much as I could," said jockey Luis Contreras. "She was fighting with me. She wanted to go every single step of the race. When I put her outside, she just exploded."

On February 26, Secret Oath was entered in the Honeybee Stakes where she was the heavy favorite in a field of six. She broke slowly but then settled into stalking position on the rail. She ran into traffic on the far turn but found a hole and quickly moved to the lead. She won easily by 7 1/2 lengths. "They convoyed her right in that pocket there a little bit and I thought, 'Well, someone has to bear out a little bit and give us some room'" said Lukas. "But then when she checked and her head went up in there I thought, 'Oh boy, this isn't a good situation,' but she's just so classy, she doesn't let anything ruffle her feathers. She just dropped down and said 'Adios.'"

With Secret Oath so dominant against the fillies at Oaklawn Park, Lukas decided to test her against the colts in the Arkansas Derby on April 2. She had a troubled trip but made a strong move while racing six-wide to move from ninth to second. She flattened in the final strides and finished third behind Cyberknife and Barber Road. "She was tired", said Lukas after the race. "That move she made was a terrific move for a filly at this stage of her career, to keep going. Watching it live, I thought she's probably going to hang a little bit here. She almost had to. It was a monster move."

==== Kentucky Oaks ====
The 2022 Kentucky Oaks, held on May 6, attracted 'arguably the best field ever' for the race according to The Thoroughbred Daily News'. In addition to Secret Oath, the field featured Nest (Ashland Stakes), two-year-old champion Echo Zulu, Kathleen O (Gulfstream Park Oaks), with several well-regarded longshots like Nostalgic (Gazelle Stakes) and Desert Dawn (Santa Anita Oaks). Breaking from post position one, Secret Oath settled in eighth place behind a fast early pace. She then moved to the outside and started her run on the final turn. She took the lead in mid-stretch and won by two lengths over Nest. It was a record tying fifth win of the Oaks for Lukas and the first for both the Mitchells and new jockey Luis Saez.

"I thought the race unfolded pretty much like what we expected", Lukas said. "Being in the one hole, we didn't have a lot of options. But down the backside, I told [Saez] not to get too creative on the turn and make his move if he was going to get in position on the backside."

"I didn't think it was a typically hard race on her today", Lukas added. "I think it was more business-like, more of a workman-like race. She wasn't blowing very hard even though it was a wet track and probably pulled a little bit out of her. But I like what I saw today in the winner's circle."

==== Preakness Stakes ====
After the Kentucky Oaks victory, Lukas again entered the filly against colts, this time in the Preakness Stakes on May 21. Secret Oath started at odds of 5-1 and finished fourth to Early Voting after a poor trip. She had trouble at the start, then was checked sharply after Happy Jack cut in front of her. On recovery, she settled near the back of the pack while racing wide into the backstretch, then lost more ground when she circled five wide around the final turn. She closed into fourth place but tired in the final furlong. Lukas commented after the race, "The fractions being slow like that, it was hard to run (them) down. She flattened out a little bit in the last eighth. It wasn't her day."

==== Summer at Saratoga ====
On July 23, Secret Oath clashed with her rival Nest in the Coaching Club American Oaks at Saratoga Race Course. Nest went to the early lead with Society and set slow early fractions while Secret Oath rated just behind. Secret Oath moved into second on the final turn but was unable to respond when Nest kicked clear in the stretch to win by 12 1/4 lengths. Lukas commented, "We got beat fair and square" and praised his former pupil Todd Pletcher, who had worked for Lukas before going on his own in 1995.

Secret Oath returned to face Nest three weeks later on August 23 in the Alabama Stakes at Saratoga over the longer 1 1/4 mile distance. She once again fell short, finishing second to Nest by 4 1/4 lengths in a time of 2:03.14. "We got outrun, we had a shot at her at the top of the stretch, she's special," Lukas said. "We had our style today. I thought Luis rode a real good race. Little bit slow on the fractions early on, that probably set up for [Nest] to kick on but we're supposed to kick on too."

==== Fall campaign ====
Secret Oath made her next start on September 24 in the Cotillion Stakes at PARX Racing. She went off as the 2-1 second choice in a field of nine. On a track that appeared to favor early speed, Society went to the front and opened up a large lead going into the final turn. Secret Oath raced in mid-pack early, then mounted a strong run to close ground as she turned into the stretch. She could not maintain the drive though and finished third. Lukas noted that Secret Oath's jockey, Luis Saez, had faced a difficult decision. "Do you ride for second or do you try to ride the one that is out there down?" he asked after the race. "(Secret Oath) made that big move on the middle of the turn and she is running faster than any of them. (Saez) had to make that move. The pacesetter was just too far in front."

On November 5 in the Breeders' Cup Distaff Secret Oath finished fifth, weakening after taking the lead as the field entered the straight. She was no match for Malathaat who won in a three-way photo finish with Blue Stripe and Clairiere finishing third.

== Retirement ==
Secret Oath was retired due to inflammation in her right front ankle. She is to be sold during 2023 November Sale at Fasig-Tipton. She was withdrawn from the same sale last year.

== Statistics ==
Date	Distance	Race	Grade	Track	Odds	Field	Finish	Winning Time	Winning (Losing) Margin	Jockey	Ref
2021 – Two-year-old season
Oct 3, 2021	1 mile	Maiden Special Weight		Churchill Downs	31.40	8	3	1:37.43	(10 1/4 lengths)	Reylu Gutierrez	
Oct 31, 2021	1 1/16 miles	Maiden Special Weight		Churchill Downs	2.80	8	1	1:46.86	5 1/4 lengths	David Cohen	
Nov 27, 2021	1 1/16 miles	Golden Rod Stakes	II	Churchill Downs	16.80	8	5	1:44.72	(11 1/4 lengths)	David Cohen	
Dec 31, 2021	1 mile	Allowance		Oaklawn Park	7.80	9	1	1:37.38	8 1/4 lengths	Luis Contreras	
2022 – Three-year-old season
Jan 29, 2022	1 1/16 miles	Martha Washington Stakes	Listed	Oaklawn Park	0.50*	6	1	1:46.21	7 1/4 lengths	Luis Contreras	
Feb 26, 2022	1 1/16 miles	Honeybee Stakes	III	Oaklawn Park	0.30*	6	1	1:44.74	7 1/2 lengths	Luis Contreras	
Apr 2, 2022	1 1/8 miles	Arkansas Derby	I	Oaklawn Park	1.40*	9	3	1:50.42	(3 1/2 lengths)	Luis Contreras	
May 6, 2022	1 1/8 miles	Kentucky Oaks	I	Churchill Downs	4.40	14	1	1:49.44	2 lengths	Luis Saez	
May 21, 2022	1 3/16 miles	Preakness Stakes	I	Pimlico	5.00	9	4	1:54.54	(6 1/4 lengths)	Luis Saez	
Jul 23, 2022	1 1/8 miles	Coaching Club American Oaks	I	Saratoga	1.20	5	2	1:51.04	(12 1/4 lengths)	Luis Saez	
Aug 20, 2022	1 1/4 miles	Alabama Stakes	I	Saratoga	4.80	7	2	2:03.14	(4 1/4 lengths)	Luis Saez	
Sep 24, 2022	1 1/16 miles	Cotillion Stakes	I	Parx Racing	2.20	9	3	1:42.94	(7 3/4 lengths)	Luis Saez	
Nov 5, 2022	1 1/8 miles	Breeders' Cup Distaff	I	Keeneland	14.25	8	5	1:49.07	(5 1/2 lengths)	Luis Saez	
2023 – Four-year-old season
Mar 11, 2023	1 1/16 miles	Azeri Stakes	II	Oaklawn Park	1.40	8	1	1:43.26	2 3/4 lengths	Tyler Gaffalione	
Apr 15, 2023	1 1/16 miles	Apple Blossom Handicap	I	Oaklawn Park	0.70*	4	2	1:43.36	(neck)	Tyler Gaffalione	
May 5, 2023	1 1/16 miles	La Troienne Stakes	I	Churchill Downs	1.68*	10	2	1:42.48	(neck)	Tyler Gaffalione	
Jun 10, 2023	1 1/16 miles	Ogden Phipps Stakes	I	Belmont Park	3.15	6	5	1:43.40	(12 1/2 lengths)	Tyler Gaffalione	
Aug 25, 2023	1 1/8 miles	Personal Ensign Stakes	I	Saratoga	7.20	6	2	1:49.12	(4 lengths)	Javier Castellano	

An asterisk after the odds means Secret Odds was the post-time favorite

== Pedigree ==
Pedigree of Secret Oath, chestnut filly, March 20, 2019
Sire Arrogate	Unbridled's Song	Unbridled	Fappiano
Sire Arrogate	Unbridled's Song	Unbridled	Gana Facil
Sire Arrogate	Unbridled's Song	Trolley Song	Caro (IRE)
Sire Arrogate	Unbridled's Song	Trolley Song	Lucky Spell
Sire Arrogate	Bubbler	Distorted Humor	Forty Niner
Sire Arrogate	Bubbler	Distorted Humor	Danzig's Beauty
Sire Arrogate	Bubbler	Grechelle	Deputy Minister
Sire Arrogate	Bubbler	Grechelle	Meadow Star
Dam Absinthe Minded	Quiet American	Fappiano	Mr. Prospector
Dam Absinthe Minded	Quiet American	Fappiano	Killaloe
Dam Absinthe Minded	Quiet American	Demure	Dr. Fager
Dam Absinthe Minded	Quiet American	Demure	Quiet Charm
Dam Absinthe Minded	Rockford Peach	Great Above	Minnesota Mac
Dam Absinthe Minded	Rockford Peach	Great Above	Ta Wee
Dam Absinthe Minded	Rockford Peach	Strawberry Skyline	Hatchet Man
Dam Absinthe Minded	Rockford Peach	Strawberry Skyline	Drylook (family 9f)

Secret Oath is inbred 4s x 3d to Fappiano, meaning Fappiano appears in the fourth generation on the sire's side of the pedigree and in the third generation on the dam's side.
