= Nest (horse) =

American-bred Thoroughbred racehorse

- Sire: Curlin
- Grandsire: Smart Strike
- Dam: Marion Ravenwood
- Damsire: A.P. Indy
- Sex: Mare
- Foaled: April 8, 2019 (age 7)
- Country: United States
- Color: Bay
- Breeder: Ashview Farm & Colts Neck Stables
- Owner: Repole Stable; Eclipse Thoroughbred Partners (2020–2023); Michael House (2020–2023)
- Trainer: Todd A. Pletcher
- Record: 14: 8–2–2
- Earnings: $2,172,675

Major wins
- Demoiselle Stakes (2021); Ashland Stakes (2022); Coaching Club American Oaks (2022); Alabama Stakes (2022); Beldame Stakes (2022); Shuvee Stakes (2023)

Awards
- American Champion Three-Year-Old Filly (2022)
- Last updated on 9 October 2023

Nest (foaled April 8, 2019) is a Champion American thoroughbred racehorse who has won multiple Grade I events as a three-year-old in 2022, including the Ashland Stakes, Coaching Club American Oaks and Alabama Stakes. She also finished second in the 2022 Belmont Stakes, racing against male counterparts in that Triple Crown event.

== Background ==
Nest is a bay mare that was bred in Kentucky by Ashview Farm and Colts Neck Stables. Her sire is Curlin, the 2007 and 2008 American Horse of the Year and stands at Hill 'n' Dale Farms and her dam Marion Ravenwood was a stakes winner who was sired by the 1992 American Horse of the Year A.P. Indy.

She was bought by Ashview Farm's agent on behalf of Repole Stable, Eclipse Thoroughbred Partners & Michael House, for US$350,000 at the 2020 Keeneland September Selected Yearling Sale. Nest is a full sister to the 2021 Grade 1 Santa Anita Handicap winner Idol. Nest is trained by U.S. Racing Hall of Fame trainer Todd Pletcher. Four of the dam's six foals are winners from five starters. Her only foal yet to start as of 2022 is a 2-year-old colt by Violence named Lost Ark.

== Racing career ==
=== 2021: Two-year-old season ===
Nest began her racing career on September 25 in a Maiden Special Weight event over 1 1/16 miles at Belmont Park against four other experienced fillies. Starting as the 19/20 odds-on favorite eased back off the pace while showing early speed, taking the lead with two furlongs to run and widening her margin of victory to 5 lengths in a time of 1:43.88.

On November 5 Nest returned to the track at Belmont Park in the Listed Tempted Stakes over 1 mile. From post 7 Nest started awkwardly bumping Surprisingly and forced back mid-field through the event. Although Nest tried and rallied she was no match for the winner Gerrymander, finishing three-quarters of a length in third.

Todd Pletcher entered Nest in the Grade II Demoiselle Stakes at Aqueduct Racetrack on December 4 over the longer distance of 1 1/8 miles. Nest went off as the narrow 8–5 favorite and was forced to take the overland route around the track while carried five wide around the clubhouse turn, settled a few lengths back in fourth position. Jockey Irad Ortiz Jr. shook up Nest after a dawdling three-quarters in 1:15.80, and she loomed four wide into the lane to challenge Venti Valentine and Magic Circle in a stretch duel to the finish. Nest was victorious by a neck over Venti Valentine but jockey John Velazquez aboard Venti Valentine protested against Ortiz, alleging interference in the straight, but the stewards dismissed the claim. Pletcher commented after the race, "There have been some tight finishes and a little drama to go along with it, but I'm thankful to be on the right side of it all. (Nest) was never able to take over and save much ground, but she got the job done. I'm obviously very happy to be on the winning end." Pletcher said Nest would join his string at Palm Beach Downs for the winter after earning 10 points on the Road to the Kentucky Oaks.

=== 2022: Three-year-old season ===
Nest started her three-year-old campaign at Tampa Bay Downs in the Listed Suncoast Stakes on February 12. Starting as the 3/10 odds-on favorite she settled into a stalking position in third early under jockey Irad Ortiz Jr. Longshot Mining Chrome cruised through a moderate fractions, but into the run for the far turn, Nest, pounced on the leaders and took charge. Alittleloveandluck clung gamely to the lead down the lane but was overcome hallway down the stretch by Nest, who sailed clear to a six-length victory in 1:39.30 for the mile and 40 yards distance on a fast track. Pletcher was full of praise. "We're all very pleased with (Nest)'s performance," he said. "She did it professionally and seemed to finish with good energy. We're very excited. She should improve with time and distance."

On April 8 Nest started in the Grade I Ashland Stakes at Keeneland. Facing seven other fillies Nest was rating in fourth early behind the leaders. Then she overcame a wide trip to reel in pacesetting Interstatedaydream late on the second turn and powered her away for easy 8 1/4 lengths victory in 1:44.16 on a track that was official noted as Wet Fast. Jockey Ortiz commented, "That was nice. She was traveling perfect the whole time. She moved great. At the three-eighths pole, I asked her a little bit, and she moved forward, more than what I wanted to." Part-owner Eclipse Thoroughbred Partners' president and founder Aron Wellman gleefully said, "Man, this was the performance we were hoping to see. Again, all credit goes to Todd (trainer Pletcher). He's just the master. When he's got a target, he doesn't miss the bull's eye too often."

The Kentucky Oaks, held on May 6, attracted 'arguably the best field ever' for the race according to The Thoroughbred Daily News'. In addition to Nest, the field featured Secret Oath (Honeybee Stakes winner), two-year-old champion Echo Zulu, Kathleen O (Gulfstream Park Oaks), with several well-regarded longshots like Nostalgic (Gazelle Stakes) and Desert Dawn (Santa Anita Oaks). Breaking from post position four, Nest raced in the two path along the first turn, chased the early pace, was in the six path into the lane, made a bid down the lane, was under a long drive for second in the final stages while slowly gaining on Secret Oath. Trainer Pletcher comment after the event, "I'm really happy for Wayne (D. Wayne Lukas trainer of the winner). If I couldn't win this race, I was rooting for him. Irad told me that he couldn't get out the whole race. He had to wait and wait. When he finally got loose, (Nest) ran big."

Although Nest was second best in the Kentucky Oaks, trainer Todd Pletcher consulted with the owners and was confident that Nest could challenge the male horses in the Belmont Stakes especially that the added distance of 1 1/2 miles would suit her pedigree. On June 11 entered the Belmont Stakes and faced her stablemate Mo Donegal and 2022 Kentucky Derby winner Rich Strike and five other horses. Regular rider Irad Ortiz Jr. opted to ride Mo Donegal, so Pletcher called upon brother Jose Ortiz. Nest was selected as the fourth pick in the field starting at odds of just over 5/1. Nest stumbled at the start and was bumped by Rich Strike, who broke inwards and she conceded three lengths. Making up some ground she advanced along the rail into the opening bend and settled just behind the two leaders down along the rail before tipping to the two path down the backstretch. Jose Ortiz angled her out four to five wide straightened away into upper stretch, and ran on to chase Mo Donegal to finish second best, three lengths behind her stablemate. Mike Repole who bought 25% share of Mo Donegal managed to score an exacta with Nest in second.

On July 23 Nest clashed with her rival Secret Oath in the Grade 1 Coaching Club American Oaks at Saratoga Race Course. Nest with regular jockey Irad Ortiz Jr. shrugged off the bid of her adversary and rolled to a victory in the 1 1/8 mile race. The final margin of victory was 12 1/4 lengths, and according to the media it could have been more if Ortiz had continued to urge his mount as she approached the wire. Todd Pletcher was originally going to wait for the GI Alabama Stakes August 20 because he wanted to give his filly time to recover from the grueling Belmont against the colts and geldings. Pletcher commenting, "We've run a lot of horses in the Belmont over the years, but we've never had one come out any better than she did. Nest had great energy, and she gained weight. She gave us every indication she was ready to run back."

Nest returned to the track three weeks later on August 23 in the Grade 1 Alabama Stakes at Saratoga. Starting as the 35/100 odds-on favorite Nest broke awkwardly from the starting gate recovering quickly and then stalkeing pacesetting longshot She's Keen through fraction of 24.39 seconds for the quarter, 49.44 for the half, and 1:14.37 for six furlongs. Nest made the lead approaching the quarter pole, and regular jockey Ortiz, who had been warned by trainer Todd Pletcher for an outside run from Secret Oath turning for home, let his filly roll. Nest ran away from Secret Oath and the five other fillies to win by 4 1/4 lengths in a time of 2:03.14.

On October 9, Nest faced old horses in the Grade II Beldame Stakes at Aqueduct for the first time in a small field of five runners. Starting as the 1/20 odds-on favorite Nest settled into the middle of the field with early fractions of :24.52 and :49.01. She then moved steadily behind Travel Column and First to Act. With the six-furlong marker time of 1:13.16 met her rivals on the outside, and they quickly proved to be no match powering down the stretch several paths wide drawing away to win by almost ten lengths in a time of 1:52.38. Co-owner Mike Repole commented after the race, "She had two tough races in Saratoga, even though she won impressively. We didn't want to give her 11 weeks off, so we needed to find the right spot and get her a good start where she would have to assert herself but save something for four weeks from now, and I think we found a perfect spot."

On November 5 in the Breeders' Cup Distaff, Nest started as the 3/2 favorite but finished fourth behind winner and stablemate Malathaat after staging a mild rally mid-race. Still, Nest was awarded American Champion Three-Year-Old Filly honors at the Eclipse Awards for her accomplishments during the year.

=== 2023: Four-year-old season ===
Nest was rested for several months after the Breeders' Cup, and published her first workout of 2023 in April at the Palm Beach Downs training center in Florida. After initially floating the Ogden Phipps Stakes as a potential target, Pletcher sent Nest to Saratoga's Shuvee Stakes. The four-horse race had been viewed as a showdown between Nest and top distaff runner Clairiere, but Nest was able to prevail with a 2 1/4-length victory in her first race in eight months. Nest then followed up with a third-place finish in the Personal Ensign Stakes at Saratoga and a fourth-place finish in the Spinster Stakes at Keeneland, losing both races to Idiomatic.

On October 21—two weeks before the Breeders' Cup—it was announced that Nest would not be pre-entered into the Breeders' Cup Distaff and would instead be put up for auction in November at the Fasig-Tipton November Sale. Pletcher said that Nest had been training fine, but didn't see the same energy that he saw from her before. "We’re kind of running out of time to be at our peak for a race that you have to obviously be at your very best for," he said. Pletcher added it was not certain that Nest would be retired, and had even suggested that co-owner Mike Repole could buy out his partners at the auction for sole ownership of the horse. This is exactly what happened, as Repole bought out his partners with a final bid of $6 million on Nest at the Fasig-Tipton November Sale. After the sale, Repole said that he planned to bring Nest back to the races if she was able, otherwise she would be bred to his roster of stallions.

== Retirement and Breeding career ==
On May 8, 2024, Mike Repole announced to the Daily Racing Form that Nest had been retired, saying that a diagnostic examination prior to Nest's shipment to Saratoga for a potential five-year-old campaign revealed "a slight abnormality in her hind ankle." Repole said that Nest was shipped to Lane's End Farm and would be bred to Uncle Mo.

== Statistics ==
Date	Distance	Race	Grade	Track	Odds	Field	Finish	Winning Time	Winning (Losing) Margin	Jockey	Ref
2021 – Two-year-old season
Sep 25, 2021	1 1/16 miles	Maiden Special Weight		Belmont Park	0.95*	5	1	1:43.88	5 lengths	Irad Ortiz Jr.	
Nov 5, 2021	1 mile	Tempted Stakes	Listed	Belmont Park	3.95	7	3	1:38.13	(3/4 length)	Dylan Davis	
Dec 4, 2021	1 1/8 miles	Demoiselle Stakes	II	Aqueduct	1.75*	8	1	1:55.07	neck	Irad Ortiz Jr.	
2022 – Three-year-old season
Feb 12, 2022	1 mile & 40 yards	Suncoast Stakes	Listed	Tampa Bay Downs	0.30*	7	1	1:39.30	6 lengths	Irad Ortiz Jr.	
Apr 8, 2022	1 1/16 miles	Ashland Stakes	I	Keeneland	1.70*	8	1	1:44.16	8 1/4 lengths	Irad Ortiz Jr.	
May 6, 2022	1 1/8 miles	Kentucky Oaks	I	Churchill Downs	2.40*	14	2	1:49.44	(2 lengths)	Irad Ortiz Jr.	
Jun 11, 2022	1 1/2 miles	Belmont Stakes	I	Belmont Park	5.30*	8	2	2:28.28	(3 lengths)	Jose Ortiz	
Jul 23, 2022	1 1/8 miles	Coaching Club American Oaks	I	Saratoga	0.95*	5	1	1:51.04	12 1/4 lengths	Irad Ortiz Jr.	
Aug 20, 2022	1 1/4 miles	Alabama Stakes	I	Saratoga	0.35*	7	1	2:03.14	4 1/4 lengths	Irad Ortiz Jr.	
Oct 9, 2022	1 1/8 miles	Beldame Stakes	II	Aqueduct	0.05*	5	1	1:52.38	9 3/4 lengths	Irad Ortiz Jr.	
Nov 5, 2022	1 1/8 miles	Breeders' Cup Distaff	I	Keeneland	1.48*	8	4	1:49.07	(3 1/4 length)	Irad Ortiz Jr.	
2023 – Four-year-old season
Jul 23, 2023	1 1/8 miles	Shuvee Stakes	II	Saratoga	0.85	4	1	1:50.72	2 1/4 lengths	Irad Ortiz Jr.	
Aug 25, 2023	1 1/8 miles	Personal Ensign Stakes	I	Saratoga	0.75*	6	3	1:49.12	(4 1/4 lengths)	Irad Ortiz Jr.	
Oct 8, 2023	1 1/8 miles	Spinster Stakes	I	Keeneland	0.91*	6	4	1:49.82	(11 1/4 lengths)	Irad Ortiz Jr.	

An (*) asterisk after the odds means Nest was the post-time favorite.

== Pedigree ==
Pedigree of Nest, bay filly, April 8, 2019
Sire Curlin (2004)	Smart Strike (1992)	Mr. Prospector (1970)	Raise A Native (1961)
Sire Curlin (2004)	Smart Strike (1992)	Mr. Prospector (1970)	Gold Digger (1962)
Sire Curlin (2004)	Smart Strike (1992)	Classy 'n Smart (1981)	Smarten (1976)
Sire Curlin (2004)	Smart Strike (1992)	Classy 'n Smart (1981)	No Class (CAN) (1974)
Sire Curlin (2004)	Sherriff's Deputy (1994)	Deputy Minister (CAN) (1979)	Vice Regent (CAN) (1967)
Sire Curlin (2004)	Sherriff's Deputy (1994)	Deputy Minister (CAN) (1979)	Mint Copy (CAN) (1970)
Sire Curlin (2004)	Sherriff's Deputy (1994)	Barbarika (1985)	Bates Motel (1979)
Sire Curlin (2004)	Sherriff's Deputy (1994)	Barbarika (1985)	War Exchange(1972)
Dam Marion Ravenwood (2008)	A.P. Indy (1989)	Seattle Slew (1974)	Bold Reasoning (1968)
Dam Marion Ravenwood (2008)	A.P. Indy (1989)	Seattle Slew (1974)	My Charmer (1969)
Dam Marion Ravenwood (2008)	A.P. Indy (1989)	Weekend Surprise (1980)	Secretariat (1970)
Dam Marion Ravenwood (2008)	A.P. Indy (1989)	Weekend Surprise (1980)	Lassie Dear (1974)
Dam Marion Ravenwood (2008)	Andujar (2001)	Quiet American (1986)	Fappiano (1977)
Dam Marion Ravenwood (2008)	Andujar (2001)	Quiet American (1986)	Demure (1977)
Dam Marion Ravenwood (2008)	Andujar (2001)	Nureyev's Best (1985)	Nureyev (1977)
Dam Marion Ravenwood (2008)	Andujar (2001)	Nureyev's Best (1985)	Meadow Blue (1975) (family 4d)
