= Connect (horse) =

American-bred Thoroughbred racehorse

- Sire: Curlin
- Grandsire: Smart Strike
- Dam: Bullville Belle
- Damsire: Holy Bull
- Sex: Stallion
- Foaled: 2013
- Country: United States
- Colour: Bay
- Breeder: Fox Straus KY
- Owner: Paul P. Pompa, Jr.
- Trainer: Chad C. Brown
- Record: 8: 6-0-1
- Earnings: US$ $1,370,000

Major wins
- Curlin Stakes (2016); Pennsylvania Derby (2016); Cigar Mile Handicap (2016); Westchester Stakes (2017)

Connect (foaled May 6, 2013) is a retired racehorse who is best known for his wins in the grade II Pennsylvania Derby and grade I Cigar Mile Handicap.

== Background ==
Connect is a dark bay with no face markings as well as no feet markings. He was bred by Fox Straus in Kentucky. He is owned by Paul P. Pompa Jr. and trained by Chad Brown. He is sired by the legendary Curlin, who won the Breeders Cup Classic, Dubai World Cup, and Jockey Club Gold Cup. Curlin also sired such greats as five-time grade 1 winner Stellar Wind, and Belmont Stakes winner Palace Malice. His dam, Bullville Belle, is by the great Holy Bull. Connect was bought for $150,000 at the 2014 Fasig Tipton Kentucky Select Yearling Sale. Foaled at Sparks View Farm in Paris Kentucky.

== Two-year-old season ==
Connect only ran once on December 5, 2015. Seven horses ran against Connect in this race. He broke fairly well, starting out in fifth place. He stayed on the outside going four wide at the start. He moved up to fourth, then third. He was four lengths behind the leaders and went four wide. But he did not move any closer to the leaders and stayed four lengths behind and finished third.

== Three-year-old season ==
Following his third-place finish, Connect took a six-month break from racing. After his break, Connect would try again to win his first race. At the start of the race, Connect dropped to fifth. For the first quarter of a mile, he stayed in fifth only two lengths. After that, he made a quick sweeping move just in front by a head. Right after that, he opened up his lead to win his first race by four lengths. Next up was an allowance less than two months later. At the start, he was sixth but quickly moved up to second. He comfortably stalked the leader Wake Up In Malibu until the homestretch, where he took over the lead and went on to win by three and three-quarter lengths.

Following two straight races, Connect attempted to go three in a row with his stakes debut in the Curlin Stakes. At the start of the race he was fourth but by the first quarter of a mile, he was in the lead. For the rest of the race, he led by one length with no one being able to catch him. Following his win, he would make his graded stakes debut in the Travers Stakes. At the start of the race, Connect stayed in the middle of the field in seventh, then moved up to sixth. Despite moving all the way up to fourth, he fell back in the stretch and finished sixth.

Despite the performance, he went to another graded stakes attempt 28 days later in the Pennsylvania Derby. He had another big field to deal with. This included Kentucky Derby winner Nyquist, Louisiana Derby winner Gun Runner, and Preakness Haskell and Santa Anita Derby winner Exaggerator. At the start he was seventh, but by the first quarter of a mile he had moved up to fifth. After dropping back to sixth he moved up on the rail. While three other horses (Awesome Slew, Gun Runner, Nyquist) were on the outside, all of them were less than a length apart from each other. With a furlong to go, Awesome Slew and Nyquist began to fall back and were out of contention for winning. Gun Runner charged on the far outside while Connect fought back intrepidly. At the wire, Connect was the winner by half a length.

After a 63-day break, Connect was back to try and get his first Grade 1 win to redeem his defeat in the Travers Stakes. Also, this would be Connect's first time to race against elder horses. At the start Connect settled in sixth place for the start of the race. Starting with half a mile Connect began to move up placings one by one, quarter by quarter, until the final turn where he moved up to second. He was just half a length away from victory and just needed to pass the leader Divining Rod. Eventually, it turned into a dogfight. For every head bob, Divining Rod and Connect traded placings. One moment one would be in front and the next behind. Soon Connect persisted and took the lead to win by a nose.

== Four-year-old season ==
After a six-month hiatus, Connect made his return in the Westchester Handicap. He became the odds-on favorite at 4/5. At the start, he was forwardly placed, but he quickly dropped back to fifth. He stayed in fifth just two lengths behind. Half a mile into the race he began to make his move and took over the lead three-quarters of a mile in and led by a length. By the homestretch, he had opened his lead to two and a half lengths. For the rest of the race, he kept opening up his lead to four and three-quarter lengths. Frammento, who finished third, was 13 1/2 lengths behind Connect. His win in the Westchester Handicap was supposed to be a prep for the Metropolitan Handicap. Unfortunately, a minor injury caused him to scratch from the race. Later he would be forced to retire when Connect suffered a soft tissue injury. After this Connect was put out to work as a stud at Lanes End Farm.

== Stud career ==
=== Notable progeny ===
c = colt, f = filly, g = gelding

Foaled	Name	Sex	Major Wins
2019	Rattle N Roll	c	Breeders' Futurity Stakes
