= Clairiere =

American racehorse

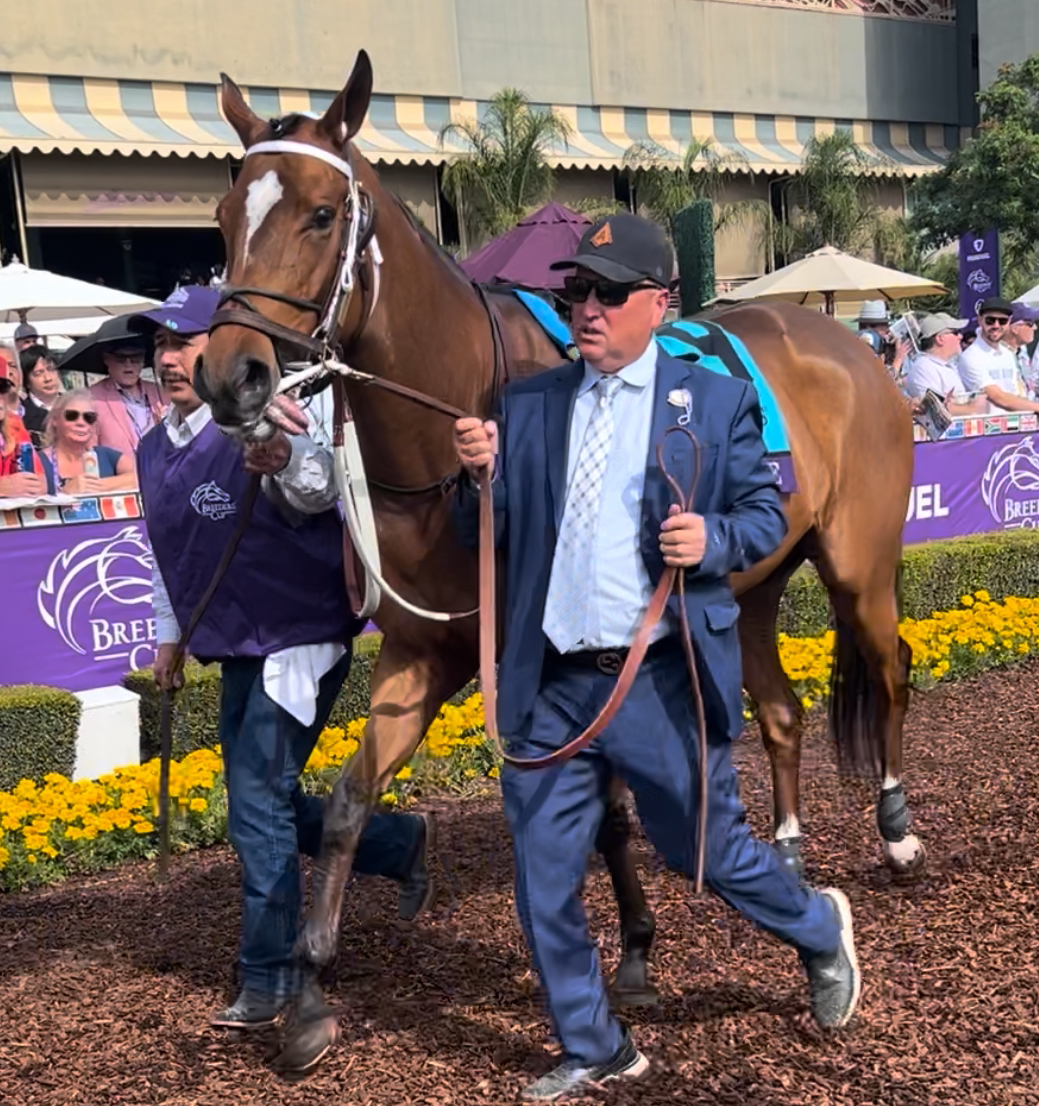
- Clairiere before the 2023 Breeders Cup Distaff
- Sire: Curlin
- Grandsire: Smart Strike
- Dam: Cavorting
- Damsire: Bernardini
- Sex: Mare
- Foaled: 17 March 2018 (age 7)
- Country: United States
- Color: Bay
- Breeder: Stonestreet Thoroughbred Holdings
- Owner: Stonestreet Stables
- Trainer: Steven M. Asmussen
- Record: 22 : 8–6–3
- Earnings: $3,266,392

Major wins
- Rachel Alexandra Stakes (2021); Cotillion Stakes (2021); Ogden Phipps Stakes (2022, 2023); Shuvee Stakes (2022); Apple Blossom Handicap (2023)
- Last updated on 5 November 2023

Clairiere (foaled March 17, 2018) is an American multiple graded stakes winning Thoroughbred racehorse. Her graded wins include the Grade I Cotillion Stakes in 2021 and the Grade I Ogden Phipps Stakes twice at Belmont Park.

== Background ==
Clairiere is a bay mare who was bred in Kentucky by Stonestreet Thoroughbred Holdings and is owned Stonestreet Stables. She was sired by Curlin, who was the two-time American Horse of the Year. Curlin was known for his class – the ability to carry his speed over classic distances – with wins including the 2007 Preakness Stakes, 2007 Breeders' Cup Classic and 2008 Dubai World Cup. Since retiring to stud, he has finished in the top ten on the North American sire list several times, including second-place finishes in 2016 and 2019. His most notable progeny, including Exaggerator, Palace Malice, Stellar Wind and Vino Rosso, are also known for their stamina. Clairiere was the first foal out of her dam Cavorting, a multiple Grade I winner, by Bernardini who at 3 won the Test Stakes and at 4 stretched out to win the Ogden Phipps Stakes and Personal Ensign Stakes.

Clairiere is trained by U.S. Racing Hall of Fame trainer Steven M. Asmussen.

== Racing career ==
=== 2020: two-year-old season ===
Clairiere made her debut on October 25 in a maiden special weight at Churchill Downs. She went off as the 18/5-second choice in a field of nine and was the only first-time starter. She started at the rear of the pace in the three to four paths around the turns, shifted five wide turning for home, then produced a grinding rally through the lane while drifting in subtly, reached late and won by 1/2 length.

She made her final start of the year in the Grade 2 Golden Rod Stakes also at Churchill Downs on 28 November. Clairiere bumped an inner foe at the start, saved ground far off of the pace through the first turn, rallied four wide around the far turn to bid for the lead turning for home, forged an advantage from inner foes in upper stretch, cleared off inside the furlong pole, but was worn down by Travel Column approaching the wire.

=== 2021: three-year-old season ===
Clairiere began her three-year-old season with a classy victory in the Grade 2 Rachel Alexandra Stakes at the Fair Grounds Race Course in New Orleans. From post 1 jockey Joe Talamo rode Clairiere confidently in an eight-horse field in the 1 1/16 mile event, letting 25–1 shot Off We Go to lead with a fast pace while tracking along at the back of the pack. Despite hitting the inside of the gate at the start, Clairiere recovered well and saved ground as Off We Go put up fractions of :23.73 and :47.99, with even-money choice Travel Column tracking along in second. Clairiere ranged up into contention and was primed to strike along the rail. Talamo shifted out to run down the favorite in the final sixteenth, and she got up by a neck under strong handling in a time was 1:45.34 on a fast track. Trainer Asmussen said, "For her to win the Rachel Alexandra in the Stonestreet silks is extremely special." Asmussen trained Hall of Famer Rachel Alexandra through her nine starts for Stonestreet and Harold McCormick.

What started as a promising season ended as mostly a bridesmaid role. In her next start Travel Column turned the tables and defeated Clairiere in the Fair Grounds Oaks by 2 3/4 lengths. Nonetheless, connections proceeded to the Kentucky Oaks where Clairiere ran into Malathaat finishing fourth, three lengths adrift. In the Mother Goose Stakes, Clairiere facing a small field of five runners, she had the misfortune of stumbling at the start which cost her any chance of winning. Clairiere third in the July 24 (G1) Coaching Club American Oaks — in which Maracuja upset Malathaat by a head—and followed that performance she out finished second to Malathaat in the August 21 (G1) Alabama Stakes.

Clairiere, finally in her fourth Grade I start won the Cotillion Stakes at Parx Racing. With jockey Ricardo Santana Jr. aboard, Clairiere rallied five-wide down the stretch and continued on to a 2 1/2 length victory in the 1 1/16 miles event. It was her first win in six starts since winning on February 13 (Rachel Alexandra Stakes). Clairiere was settled in sixth place in the early going of the event. Always Carina showed the way through easy quarter-mile fractions of :24.92, :49.67, and 1:13.87 as Grade II winner Obligatory pressed the pace in second ahead of Maracuja, and Army Wife, another grade 2 winner, raced mid-pack. Santana then urged Clairiere to go on the turn and they swung out into the stretch. As five of them lined up across the track, Clairiere circled the field won her first grade 1 event in a time of 1:44.31 on the fast track.

In her last start of the year, Clairiere travelled to the West Coast for the G1 Breeders' Cup Distaff held at Del Mar Racetrack. Clairiere lagged behind early, trailed to the far turn, ranged up wide on the second bend, got floated seven wide into the stretch. Marche Lorraine surged to the lead past the three-eighths pole but would have to hold off a slew of challengers, including Malathaat, Dunbar Road with Clairiere finishing fourth.

=== 2022: four-year-old season ===
On 16 March Clairiere began her four-year-old season at Fair Grounds Race Course in an Allowance Optional Claiming event. Starting at 1/10 odds-on she easily dispatched her rivals with a 6 1/2 lengths victory.

Connections entered her in the GI Apple Blossom Handicap at Oaklawn Park which attracted a small field but one which included Ce Ce who won this event in 2020 and the 2021 U.S. Champion Female Sprint Horse and Letruska, 2021 winner of this event and U.S. Champion Older Dirt Female Horse. Clairiere was last away, settling off the pace in the two path, continued off the inside into the far turn. Jockey Joel Rosario roused for some effort into the lane, in an all out drive past the furlong marker, finished up well slowly getting closer to the Letruska to finish second.

On June 11 Clairiere faced Letruska and her old rival Malathaat in Grade I Ogden Phipps Stakes at Belmont Park. In the stretch, the race came down to Malathaat and Clairiere as Letruska was eased down due to the torrid early pace. Clairiere prevailed in a very fleet 1:41.10 under jockey Joel Rosario for the 1 1/16 miles event. Asmussen said, "It was very special with the field here. It's a wonderful experience. Going 1:41 for a mile and sixteenth. Is that even possible?" Referring to Clairiere breeding, her dam Cavorting had won this event in 2016 Asmussen responded, "She's really racing royalty. A Curlin out of Cavorting. The race she put together today was beautiful. This was a tremendous stage for her."

In her next start on 24 July in Grade II Shuvee Stakes at Saratoga Race Course in a small field of four Clairiere again faced rival Malathaat and again defeated her winning the event by 1 1/2 lengths in a time of 1:51.96 on a track labeled fast. Clairiere was given a crafty ride by Joel Rosario, who won the race after he had to steady sharply at the top of the stretch. Rosario was looking for a way through and had to decide whether to go to the inside or the outside. When Exotic West began to tire, she came off the rail, leaving a spot for Clairiere. Jockey Joel Rosario after the event commented "She was there for me. I was looking to see where to go and it looked like it opened up inside and I just had to go with it. She did great."

On 27 August in the Grade I Personal Ensign Stakes, Clairiere was made the 8/5 favorite in a small field of five which included rivals Malathaat and Letruska. It appeared Clairiere was disturbed as she charged the gate twice before the start and appeared to hit her head. She was never a factor and finished last. It was found that Clairiere had a "pretty significant" cut on her tongue after hitting the front of the starting gate.

On November 5 in the Breeders' Cup Distaff Clairiere finished third to Malathaat in a three-way photo finish. Malathaat defeated Blue Stripe by a nose and Clairiere was a nose away in third.

== Statistics ==
Date	Distance	Race	Grade	Track	Odds	Field	Finish	Winning Time	Winning (Losing) Margin	Jockey	Ref
2020 – Two-year-old season
Oct 25, 2020	1 1/16 miles	Maiden Special Weight		Churchill Downs	3.60	9	1	1:44.85	1/2 length	Ricardo Santana Jr.	
Nov 28, 2020	1 1/16 miles	Golden Rod Stakes	II	Churchill Downs	5.00	9	2	1:43.98	(1 length)	Ricardo Santana Jr.	
2021 – Three-year-old season
Feb 13, 2021	1 1/16 miles	Rachel Alexandra Stakes	II	Fair Grounds	2.30	8	1	1:45.34	Neck	Joseph Talamo	
Mar 20, 2021	1 1/16 miles	Fair Grounds Oaks	II	Fair Grounds	3.40	7	2	1:42.75	(2 3/4 lengths)	Joseph Talamo	
Apr 30, 2021	1 1/8 miles	Kentucky Oaks	I	Churchill Downs	2.50*	13	4	1:48.99	(3 lengths)	Tyler Gaffalione	
Jun 26, 2021	1 1/16 miles	Mother Goose Stakes	II	Belmont Park	1.80	5	3	1:42.83	(1 1/4 lengths)	Irad Ortiz Jr.	
Jul 22, 2021	1 1/8 miles	Coaching Club American Oaks	I	Saratoga	2.80	4	3	1:49.29	(5 3/4 lengths)	Irad Ortiz Jr.	
Aug 21, 2021	1 1/4 miles	Alabama Stakes	I	Saratoga	8.70	7	2	2:02.59	(1 1/2 lengths)	Irad Ortiz Jr.	
Sep 29, 2021	1 1/4 miles	Cotillion Stakes	I	Parx Racing	2.60*	8	1	1:44.31	2 1/2 lengths	Ricardo Santana Jr.	
Nov 6, 2021	1 1/8 miles	Breeders' Cup Distaff	I	Del Mar	10.10	11	4	1:47.67	(3/4 length)	Ricardo Santana Jr.	
2022 – Four-year-old season
Mar 16, 2022	1 1/16 miles	Allowance Optional Claiming		Fair Grounds	0.10*	6	1	1:43.21	6 1/2 lengths	Joel Rosario	
Apr 23, 2022	1 1/16 miles	Apple Blossom Handicap	I	Oaklawn Park	1.30	5	2	1:42.22	(1 1/4 lengths)	Joel Rosario	
Jun 11, 2022	1 1/16 miles	Ogden Phipps Stakes	I	Belmont Park	4.80	5	1	1:41.10	Head	Joel Rosario	
Jul 24, 2022	1 1/8 miles	Shuvee Stakes	II	Saratoga	1.50	4	1	1:51.96	1 1/2 lengths	Joel Rosario	
Aug 27, 2022	1 1/8 miles	Personal Ensign Stakes	I	Saratoga	1.75*	5	5	1:48.30	(9 1/2 lengths)	Joel Rosario	
Nov 5, 2022	1 1/8 miles	Breeders' Cup Distaff	I	Keeneland	6.13	8	3	1:49.07	(Head)	Joel Rosario	
2023 – Five-year-old season
Mar 11, 2023	1 1/16 miles	Azeri Stakes	II	Oaklawn Park	1.00*	8	2	1:43.26	(2 3/4 lengths)	Joel Rosario	
Apr 15, 2023	1 1/16 miles	Apple Blossom Handicap	I	Oaklawn Park	1.50	4	1	1:43.36	Neck	Joel Rosario	
Jun 10, 2023	1 1/16 miles	Ogden Phipps Stakes	I	Belmont Park	1.75*	6	1	1:43.40	1/2 length	Joel Rosario	
Jul 23, 2023	1 1/8 miles	Shuvee Stakes	II	Saratoga	0.75*	4	2	1:50.72	(2 1/4 lengths)	Joel Rosario	
Aug 25, 2023	1 1/8 miles	Personal Ensign Stakes	I	Saratoga	3.10	6	5	1:49.12	(17 3/4 lengths)	Joel Rosario	
Nov 5, 2023	1 1/8 miles	Breeders' Cup Distaff	I	Santa Anita	3.20	9	4	1:50.57	(3/4 length)	Joel Rosario	

An asterisk after the odds means Clairiere was the post-time favorite

== Pedigree ==
Pedigree of Clairiere, bay filly, March 17, 2018
Sire Curlin (2004)	Smart Strike (CAN) (1992)	Mr. Prospector (1970)	Raise A Native (1961)
Sire Curlin (2004)	Smart Strike (CAN) (1992)	Mr. Prospector (1970)	Gold Digger (1962)
Sire Curlin (2004)	Smart Strike (CAN) (1992)	Classy 'n Smart (CAN) (1981)	Smarten (1976)
Sire Curlin (2004)	Smart Strike (CAN) (1992)	Classy 'n Smart (CAN) (1981)	No Class (CAN) (1974)
Sire Curlin (2004)	Sherriff's Deputy (1994)	Deputy Minister (CAN) (1979)	Vice Regent (CAN) (1967)
Sire Curlin (2004)	Sherriff's Deputy (1994)	Deputy Minister (CAN) (1979)	Mint Copy (CAN) (1970)
Sire Curlin (2004)	Sherriff's Deputy (1994)	Barbarika (1985)	Bates Motel (1979)
Sire Curlin (2004)	Sherriff's Deputy (1994)	Barbarika (1985)	War Exchange (1972)
Dam Cavorting (2012)	Bernardini (2003)	A.P. Indy (1989)	Seattle Slew (1974)
Dam Cavorting (2012)	Bernardini (2003)	A.P. Indy (1989)	Weekend Surprise (1980)
Dam Cavorting (2012)	Bernardini (2003)	Cara Rafaela (1986)	Quiet American (1986)
Dam Cavorting (2012)	Bernardini (2003)	Cara Rafaela (1986)	Oil Fable (1986)
Dam Cavorting (2012)	Promenade Girl (2002)	Carson City (1987)	Mr. Prospector (1970)
Dam Cavorting (2012)	Promenade Girl (2002)	Carson City (1987)	Blushing Promise (1982)
Dam Cavorting (2012)	Promenade Girl (2002)	Promenade Colony (1992)	Pleasant Colony (1978)
Dam Cavorting (2012)	Promenade Girl (2002)	Promenade Colony (1992)	Dance Review (1978) (family 17-b)

Clairiere is inbred 3s × 4d to Mr. Prospector
