= 2007 Breeders' Cup Classic =

Thoroughbred horse race

24th Breeders' Cup Classic
- Breeders' Cup Classic
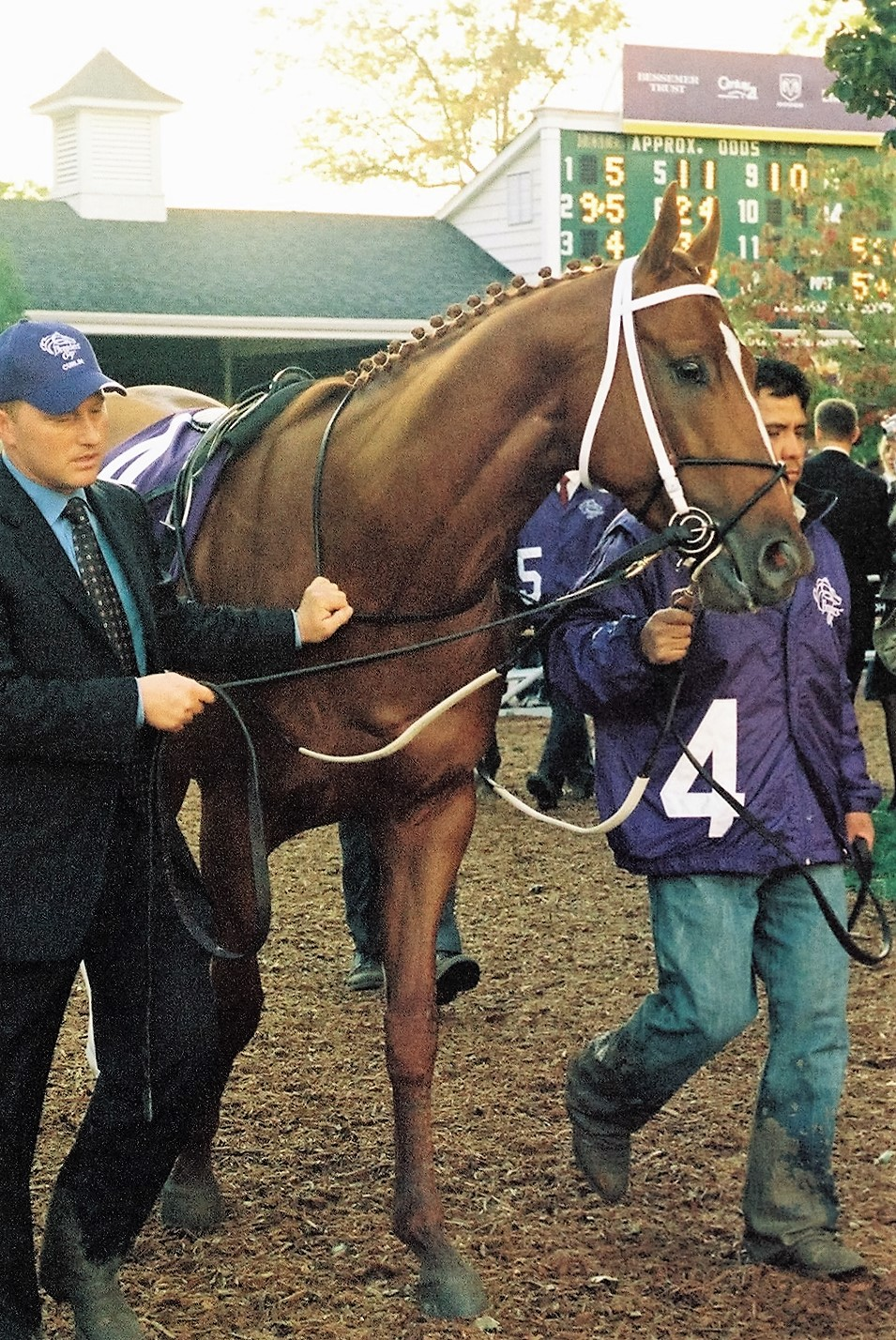
- Curlin at the 2007 Breeders' Cup
- Location: Monmouth Park
- Date: October 27, 2007
- Winning horse: Curlin
- Jockey: Robby Albarado
- Trainer: Steven Asmussen
- Owner: Stonestreet Stable
- Conditions: Sloppy (sealed)
- Surface: Dirt
- Attendance: 41,781

The 2007 Breeders' Cup Classic (in full, the Breeders' Cup Classic Powered by Dodge, due to sponsorship) was the 24th running of the Breeders' Cup Classic, part of the 2007 Breeders' Cup World Thoroughbred Championships program. It was run on October 27, 2007, at Monmouth Park Racetrack in Oceanport, New Jersey.

In a closely contested year in which the Triple Crown series was split among three different horses, Curlin emerged as the best horse of his generation with a decisive win.

The Classic is run on dirt at one mile and one-quarter (approximately 2000 m) with a purse of $5,000,000. It is run under weight-for-age conditions, with entrants carrying the following weights:

- Northern Hemisphere three-year-olds: 122 lb
- Southern Hemisphere three-year-olds: 117 lb
- Four-year-olds and up: 126 lb

== Contenders ==
Carl Nafzger, the trainer of favorite Street Sense, knew the race would be difficult for bettors to figure out. "This is one of the best fields that could be put together," he said. "They’ve got everything you want—early speed, tactical speed, closers, and soundness. They’ve been beat and they’ve beat each other. There is class scattered all the way through the field. I've never really ran against this size field with this type of quality all the way through. They’ve all proved it with different styles. It's a great Classic."

The older horse division had been weakened by the injury and subsequent retirement of Invasor, the defending Classic winner and Horse of the Year. Of the remaining older horses, the most highly regarded was Lawyer Ron, who had set a track record that summer at Saratoga when winning the Whitney and followed up with a win in the Woodward and a second to Curlin in the Jockey Club Gold Cup. He was made the morning-line favorite at odds of 5-2 but drifted at racetime to nearly 4–1. Lawyer Ron raced best when he came from off the pace, but was sometimes rank at the start of races. He was not helped by drawing the inside post position.

In the three-year-old division, Street Sense entered as the slight favorite due to victories in the Kentucky Derby and Travers Stakes, despite losses to Curlin in the Preakness and to Hard Spun in the Kentucky Cup Classic. Curlin had secured wins in the Preakness and Jockey Club Gold Cup, but had previously lost to Street Sense and Hard Spun in the Derby, and by Any Given Saturday and Hard Spun in the Haskell. Hard Spun's only Grade I victory was in the King's Bishop Stakes sprint, which left his stamina at longer distances unproven.

The sole European entry in the Classic was George Washington, who had been retired after finishing sixth in the 2006 Classic but proved sub-fertile and returned to racing.

== Race Description ==
The late-October weather in New Jersey was poor: it rained on and off for several days, stopping just in time for the Classic. The track was sloppy.

As expected, Hard Spun went to the early lead and set a brisk pace, followed by Lawyer Ron and Diamond Stripes. Any Given Saturday moved into third as they moved around the far turn then stalled. Curlin also started his move on the turn, moving alongside Hard Spun as they entered the stretch. Curlin struck the lead with a furlong to go and won by over four lengths. His time of 2:00.59 tied the old track record of 2:00 2/5 set in 1962 by Carry Back, and was especially impressive given the track conditions.

"Everything went perfectly, starting with all the speed up front", said Curlin's jockey Robby Albarado. "It unfolded just the way we wanted, but it also takes a hell of a horse to get this done. Curlin was there for us every step of the way."

It was the first Breeders' Cup victory for both Albarado and Steve Asmussen, Curlin's trainer, whose main concern was the sloppy track. "He trained on an off-track half a dozen times at the most. It's been a very dry year everywhere we've been", said Asmussen. "But he came here in great condition. And he showed up. He ran when it mattered most. He came home like he was supposed to. He's a big-day horse."

The race was marred by the breakdown of George Washington in the stretch. On-track veterinarians found open fractures to both sesamoid bones in his off-fore and determined he could not be saved. Jockey Michael Kinane said, "He was brave. He didn't go down. He stayed up on it. He saved me."

== Results ==
Finish	Program Number	Margin (lengths)	Horse	Jockey	Trainer	Final Odds	Winnings
1st	4	4 1/2	Curlin	Robby Albarado	Steven Asmussen	4.40	2,700,000
2nd	8	4 3/4	Hard Spun	Mario Pino	J. Larry Jones	8.10	1,000,000
3rd	6	1	Awesome Gem	David Flores	Craig Dollase	28.30	500,000
4th	2	8 1/4	Street Sense	Calvin Borel	Carl Nafzger	2.50	255,000
5th	9	10	Tiago	Mike Smith	John Shirreffs	12.80	125,000
6th	3	head	Any Given Saturday	Garrett Gomez	Todd Pletcher	3.90	
7th	1	8 1/4	Lawyer Ron	John Velazquez	Todd Pletcher	3.90	
8th	7		Diamond Stripes	Cornelio Velásquez	Richard Dutrow Jr.	34.30	
DNF	5		George Washington (IRE)	Michael Kinane	Aidan O'Brien	9.00	

Source: Equibase
Times: 1/4 – 0:23.11; 1/2 – 0:45.85; 3/4 – 1:10.67; mile – 1:35.86; final – 2:00.59.
Fractional Splits: (:23.11) (:22.74) (:24.82) (:25.19) (:24.73)

== Payout ==
Payout Schedule:

Program Number	Horse	Win	Place	Show
4	Curlin	10.80	5.20	4.20
8	Hard Spun		7.60	5.80
6	Awesome Gem			9.40

- $2 Exacta (4-8) Paid $70.80
- $2 Trifecta (4-8-6) Paid $646.30
- $2 Superfecta (4-8-6-2) Paid $2,146.20
