= Blue Stripe =

American racehorse

- Sire: Equal Stripes
- Grandsire: Candy Stripes
- Dam: Blues for Sale
- Damsire: Not For Sale
- Sex: Mare
- Foaled: 27 October 2017
- Country: Argentina
- Color: Bay
- Breeder: Haras La Manija
- Owner: Pozo de Luna
- Trainer: Nicolas Martin Ferro (2019–Jun 2021); Marcelo Polanco (Sept. 2021)
- Record: 10 : 6-2-2
- Earnings: $801,882

Major wins
- Arturo R. Y Arturo Bullrich (2021); Gran Premio Criadores (2021); Santa Margarita Stakes (2022); Clement L. Hirsch Stakes (2022)

Awards
- Argentine Champion Older Mare (2021)

Blue Stripe (foaled October 27, 2017 - March 11, 2026) was a dual-hemisphere Argentine-bred multiple Graded Stakes winning Thoroughbred racehorse. Her graded wins include the Group 1 Gran Premio Criadores in Argentina and the Grade I Clement L. Hirsch Stakes in 2022 at Del Mar in Southern California. She was named the 2021 Argentine Champion Older Mare.

== Background ==
Blue Stripe is a bay mare, bred by Haras La Manija in Argentina and owned by Mexican Jose Cerillo of Lomas de Chapulpepec's Pozo de Luna. Blue Stripe's sire is the Argentine bred Equal Stripes, who has three winners of the Group 1 Gran Premio Nacional (Argentine Derby) among his progeny. He led the Argentine general sire list in 2020. Blue Stripe's dam Blues for Sale was a Group winner in Argentina over 1200-1600 metre distances. Blue Stripe is a half-sister to Blue Prize, the 2019 Breeders' Cup Distaff winner at Santa Anita.

In Argentina, Blue Stripe was trained by Nicolas Martin Ferro and ridden by jockey Pavon Eduardo Ortega in all her races. In the US, she was trained by Marcelo Polanco.

== Racing career ==
=== Argentina ===
Blue Stripe began her career October 20, 2020 in the Premio Angel Comanche, a maiden event for three-year-old fillies at Hipódromo Argentino de Palermo, winning it by half a length over her owner's co-entry Serenata Huasteca in 1:37:98. A month later she was entered in the Group 1 Gran Premio Enrique Acebal over 2000 meters on the turf track at Hipódromo de San Isidro and found the class rise of the event challenging, staying up near to the leaders and fading to finish third beaten by 3 lengths to the fast finishing Bellagamba. Staying at San Isidro, Blue Stripe ran once more in the Group 1 Copa de Plata Roberto Vasquez Mansilla Internacional on December 19, 2020. Facing a field of sixteen, Blue Stripe again bounced out into the leading pack and was third down the back stretch. Staying along the rail as the field entered the straight, Blue Stripe managed to get a split and surged to challenge the eventual winner Elvas, but was found short and was overtaken close to home to finish third.

After a short break, Blue Stripe resumed on Feb 5, 2021 in the Listed Clásico Haras Argentinos on the dirt. Starting at odds of 19/5, Blue Stripe defeated the favorite Special Dubai by a 3/4 length in a fast time of 1:58.82. A month later on Mar 6, 2021, in the Group 2 Clásico Arturo R. Y Arturo Bullrich, Blue Stripe as the 3/10 odds-on favorite soundly defeated her four rivals by eight lengths.

In her last race in Argentina, Blue Stripe was entered to run in the Group 1 Gran Premio Criadores, designated as a Breeders' Cup Challenge event for the Breeders' Cup Distaff, whose winner would receive a free berth and fees paid for the Breeders' Cup World Championships. Blue Stripe started well in a field of eleven, staying off the rail in third behind pacesetter Kalivia, who took the field through the half mile in :46.40 and the mile in 1:34.37. As Kalivia faded, Blue Stripe moved into first along the rail, but was quickly engaged by the three-year-old Mahagonny, the 5-1 second choice. As the two fillies battled in the stretch, the three-year-old 84/1 longshot Soviet Catch mounted a furious drive on the outside in the final furlong, passing Mahagonny at the wire for second, but ran out of ground to collar Blue Stripe.

With four victories and twice third, Blue Stripe earned an equivalent of US$41,882 in her six starts in Argentina.

=== United States ===
On November 6, Blue Stripe, now trained by Marcelo Polanco, started in the Breeders' Cup Distaff at Del Mar. She faced a very strong field headlined by Letruska (Apple Blossom Handicap, Ogden Phipps Stakes, Personal Ensign Stakes, Spinster Stakes), Malathaat (Kentucky Oaks, Alabama Stakes), Clairiere (Cotillion Stakes), Shedaresthedevil (Kentucky Oaks, Clement L. Hirsch Stakes) and Royal Flag (Zenyatta Stakes). Ridden by British Champion Jockey Lanfranco Dettori, Blue Stripe got shuffled shortly after the start, angled to the inside, steered off the rail backstretch, moved closer outside a rival, went three wide into the far turn, five wide into the stretch, failed to threaten around the bend, and weakened in the stretch run to finish seventh behind the Japanese-owned longshot Marche Lorraine.

==== 2022: five-year-old season ====
Blue Stripe remained in California, preparing for her five-year-old season.

After a lengthy winter break, Blue Stripe was entered in the Grade 2 Santa Margarita Stakes at Santa Anita on 30 April. The 11/10 favorite, Miss Bigly, took the lead with a five-wide sweep into the stretch at the eighth pole and looked home free in the 1 1/8-mile event. Then Blue Stripe, ridden by Tyler Baze, surged even wider and went by Miss Bigly about 75 yards from the wire to win by a length in a time of 1:50.52. Marcelo Polanco said, "She was so fresh, she was ready to do something. I asked the connections if it was OK to run her in here, and they said, 'Whatever you think.' We just went for it." Jockey Tyler Baze pointed out, "I hadn't been on her, but I heard some reports that said she was ready and working tremendous. That's what my agent told me this morning. I didn't know what kind of gas pedal I had under me until the three-eighths pole. I asked her, and she ran up to 'em so quick, it caught me off guard. I had to tap on the brakes, but even with doing that, when I asked her again she accelerated and came home."

On June 18, Blue Stripe faced five other entrants in the Grade 2 Santa Maria Stakes at Santa Anita. She pulled a bit into the first turn, moved to the inside around that bend, tipped out and took aim two and then three wide into the stretch, and finished well but could not get to favorite Private Mission and was 3/4 lengths short.

On August 6, Blue Stripe garnered her first Grade 1 win in the US in the Clement L. Hirsch Stakes at Del Mar. The 1 1/16-mile event developed just as trainer Marcelo Polanco and Hector Berrios drew it up. Familiar foes Private Mission and Shedaresthedevil, who had won the race the previous year, went at a lively pace on the front end, with Private Mission completing the first quarter-mile in :23.18. Blue Stripe raced easily in third position of the five entries. Berrios recalled, "The race went exactly as we planned it. We wanted to sit behind the speed horses, then go get them late." As the field headed to the second turn, Shedaresthedevil challenged Private Mission for the lead. When Shedaresthedevil took over, the race was looked similar to the previous year's edition. However, Blue Stripe, the 5/1 third choice, ranged up outside of Shedaresthedevil, edged ahead turning for home, got clear of the favorite by the eighth pole, and scored by 1 3/4 lengths in 1:42.97.

On November 5, in the Breeders' Cup Distaff, Blue Stripe finished second by a nose to Malathaat in a three-way photo finish, with Clairiere finishing third.

== Statistics ==
Date	Distance	Race	Grade/ Group	Track	Odds	Field	Finish	Winning Time	Winning (Losing) Margin	Jockey	Ref
2020–21 – three-year-old season (Southern hemisphere)
Oct 19, 2020	1600 metres	Maiden		Hipódromo Argentino de Palermo	1.75 (Note: Blue Stripe ran as an entry with Serenata Huesteca due to same ownership of the horses)	9	1	1:37:97	1/2 length	Eduardo Pavon	
Nov 21, 2020	2000 metres	Gran Premio Enrique Acebal	I	Hipódromo de San Isidro	8.25	9	3	2:00.65	(3 lengths)	Eduardo Pavon	
Dec 19, 2020	2000 metres	Copa de Plata Roberto Vasquez Mansilla Internacional	I	Hipódromo de San Isidro	7.55	16	3	2:01.84	(3 1/2 lengths)	Eduardo Pavon	
Feb 5, 2021	2000 metres	Clasico Haras Argentinos	Listed	Hipódromo Argentino de Palermo	3.80	8	1	1:58.92	3/4 length	Eduardo Pavon	
Mar 6, 2021	2000 metres	Arturo R. Y Arturo Bullrich	II	Hipódromo Argentino de Palermo	0.30*	5	1	2:01.66	8 lengths	Eduardo Pavon	
May 1, 2021	2000 metres	Gran Premio Criadores	I	Hipódromo Argentino de Palermo	1.10*	11	1	1:59.01	head	Eduardo Pavon	
2021 – four-year-old season
Nov 6, 2021	1 1/8 miles	Breeders' Cup Distaff	I	Del Mar	53.30	11	7	1:47.67	(16 3/4 lengths)	Lanfranco Dettori	
2022 – five-year-old season
Apr 30, 2022	1 1/8 miles	Santa Margarita Stakes	II	Santa Anita	6.40	9	1	1:50.52	1 length	Tyler Baze	
Jun 16, 2022	1 1/16 miles	Santa Maria Stakes	II	Santa Anita	1.60	6	2	1:43.46	(3/4 length)	Tyler Baze	
Aug 6, 2022	1 1/16 miles	Clement L. Hirsch Stakes	I	Del Mar	5.30	5	1	1:42.97	1 3/4 lengths	Hector Berrios	
Nov 5, 2022	1 1/8 miles	Breeders' Cup Distaff	I	Keeneland	24.02	8	2	1:49.07	(nose)	Hector Berrios	

Legend:
Turf Dirt
Notes:
An (*) asterisk after the odds means Blue Stripe was the post-time favorite.

== Retirement ==
After the 2022 Breeders' Cup Distaff, Blue Stripe was sold at the Fasig-Tipton November sale, where she was purchased for $4,000,000 by Emmanuel de Seroux of Narvick International for Grand Farm in Japan. On March 11th 2026 Blue Stripe died at age 9 in Japan.

== Pedigree ==
Pedigree of Blue Stripe (ARG), bay filly, 2017
Sire Equal Stripes (ARG) (1999)	Candy Stripes (USA) (1982)	Blushing Groom (FR) (1974)	Red God (USA) (1954)
Sire Equal Stripes (ARG) (1999)	Candy Stripes (USA) (1982)	Blushing Groom (FR) (1974)	Runaway Bride (GB) (1962)
Sire Equal Stripes (ARG) (1999)	Candy Stripes (USA) (1982)	Bubble Company (FR) (1977)	Lyphard (USA) (1969)
Sire Equal Stripes (ARG) (1999)	Candy Stripes (USA) (1982)	Bubble Company (FR) (1977)	Prodice (FR) (1969)
Sire Equal Stripes (ARG) (1999)	Equity (ARG) (1991)	Equalize (USA) (1982)	Northern Jove (CAN) (1968)
Sire Equal Stripes (ARG) (1999)	Equity (ARG) (1991)	Equalize (USA) (1982)	Zonta (USA) (1973)
Sire Equal Stripes (ARG) (1999)	Equity (ARG) (1991)	Elysee (ARG) (1977)	El Gran Capitan (ARG) (1971)
Sire Equal Stripes (ARG) (1999)	Equity (ARG) (1991)	Elysee (ARG) (1977)	Empiric (ARG) (1966)
Dam Blues for Sale (ARG) (2003)	Not For Sale (ARG) (1994)	Parade Marshal (USA) (1983)	Caro (IRE) (1967)
Dam Blues for Sale (ARG) (2003)	Not For Sale (ARG) (1994)	Parade Marshal (USA) (1983)	Stepping High (USA) (1969)
Dam Blues for Sale (ARG) (2003)	Not For Sale (ARG) (1994)	Love For Sale (ARG) (1979)	Laramie Trail (USA) (1972)
Dam Blues for Sale (ARG) (2003)	Not For Sale (ARG) (1994)	Love For Sale (ARG) (1979)	Museliere (ARG) (1973)
Dam Blues for Sale (ARG) (2003)	Key Cure (USA) (1996)	Cure the Blues (USA) (1978)	Stop the Music (USA) (1970)
Dam Blues for Sale (ARG) (2003)	Key Cure (USA) (1996)	Cure the Blues (USA) (1978)	Quick Cure (USA) (1971)
Dam Blues for Sale (ARG) (2003)	Key Cure (USA) (1996)	Dancer's Key (USA) (1987)	Key to the Mint (USA) (1969)
Dam Blues for Sale (ARG) (2003)	Key Cure (USA) (1996)	Dancer's Key (USA) (1987)	Dancer's Saga (USA) (1977) (Family 16-g)
