= Curlin =

American-bred Thoroughbred racehorse

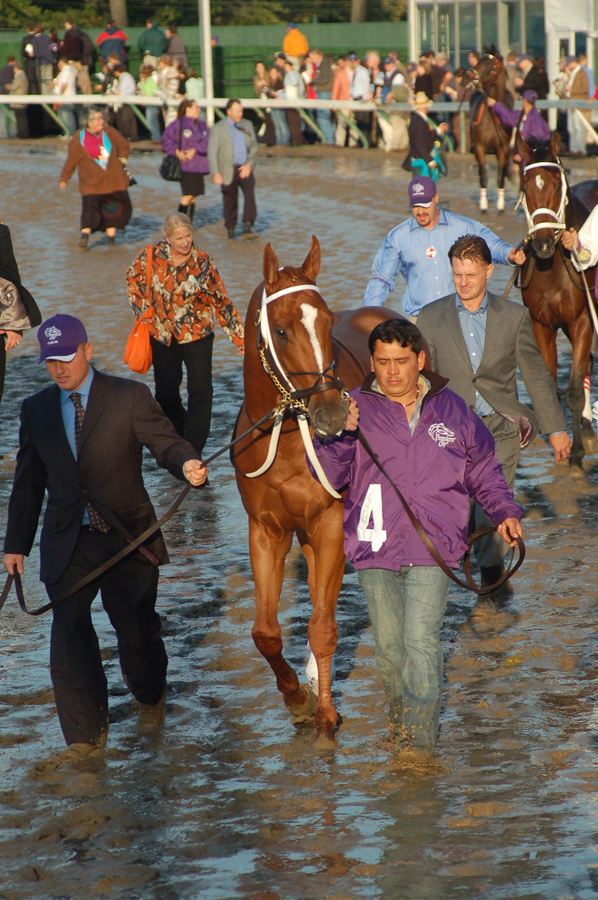
- Curlin at the 2007 Breeders' Cup Classic
- Sire: Smart Strike
- Grandsire: Mr. Prospector
- Dam: Sherriff's Deputy
- Damsire: Deputy Minister
- Sex: Stallion
- Foaled: March 25, 2004 (age 22)
- Country: United States
- Colour: Chestnut
- Breeder: Fares Farm
- Owner: Racing partnership: Stonestreet Stables & Midnight Cry Stables
- Trainer: 1) Helen Pitts; 2) Steve Asmussen
- Record: 16: 11–2–2
- Earnings: US$10,501,800

Major wins
- Rebel Stakes (2007); Arkansas Derby (2007); Jockey Club Gold Cup (2007 & 2008); Dubai World Cup (2008); Stephen Foster Handicap (2008); Woodward Stakes (2008); American Classics wins: Preakness Stakes (2007); Breeders' Cup wins: Breeders' Cup Classic (2007)

Awards
- American Champion 3-Year-Old Male Horse (2007) Co-World Champion 3-Yr-Old (2007); American Champion Older Male Horse (2008); American Horse of the Year (2007, 2008); IFHA Worlds Best Racehorse (2008) Timeform rating: 134

Honours
- United States Racing Hall of Fame (2014); Curlin Stakes at Saratoga Race Course (2009– ) Curlin Handicap at Meydan Racecourse
- Last updated on July 21, 2023

Curlin (foaled March 25, 2004, in Kentucky) is an American Thoroughbred racehorse who was the American Horse of the Year in both 2007 and 2008. He retired in 2008 as the highest North American money earner with over US$10.5 million accumulated. His major racing wins included the 2007 Preakness Stakes, 2007 Breeders' Cup Classic, and 2008 Dubai World Cup. In August 2008, Timeform assigned a 134 rating for Curlin, calling him the best horse in the world on dirt. Curlin was elected to the National Museum of Racing's Hall of Fame in 2014, his first year of eligibility.

Since retired to stud, Curlin has emerged as a major sire whose offspring include Palace Malice, Keen Ice, Exaggerator, Good Magic, Stellar Wind, Vino Rosso, Clairiere, Malathaat, Nest, Cody's Wish, Elite Power, Idiomatic, Journalism, and Golden Tempo.

== Background ==
Curlin was sired by Smart Strike, a former star from the Sam-Son Farm racing team in Ontario, Canada. Smart Strike is a half-brother of 1991 Canadian Triple Crown winner Dance Smartly. He is out of the mare Sherriff's Deputy, a daughter of Canadian Horse of the Year and two-time North American Champion sire Deputy Minister.

The colt was named for Charles Curlin, an enslaved African American from western Kentucky who fought for the Union Army in the American Civil War. One of his original owners, Shirley Cunningham, Jr. through his interest in Midnight Cry Stables, is Charles Curlin's great-grandson.

== Ownership ==
Kentucky-based class-action lawyers William Gallion and Shirley Cunningham Jr. bought Curlin for $57,000 as a yearling through their Midnight Cry Stable. They sold controlling interest (80%) in the horse in February 2007 for $3.5 million to a group composed of Jess Jackson, founder of Kendall-Jackson wines; Florida software entrepreneur Satish Sanan's Padua Stables; and George Bolton, an investment banker from San Francisco.

In August 2007 (after Curlin's 2007 Preakness win), Gallion and Cunningham were in a Boone County, Kentucky jail awaiting a federal trial on charges including conspiracy and fraud for allegedly stealing $90 million of a $200 million settlement they obtained for 418 people in a lawsuit against the makers of the diet drug fen-phen. They were convicted in 2009 and sentenced to 25 and 20 years in prison, respectively.

On November 1, 2007, Judge William Wehr ruled the 20% interest in the colt owned by Gallion and Cunningham Jr. would be turned over to the more than 400 persons involved in the fen-phen lawsuit.

On November 6, 2007, Jackson and Bolton confirmed that they bought out the interest in Curlin controlled by their partner Sanan's Padua Stables (29%).

On November 9, 2007, trainer Kenneth McPeek, who worked as a blood-stock agent and consultant for Midnight Cry Stable, filed suit in Circuit Court in Jefferson County, Kentucky alleging that the stable breached a contract calling for him to be paid a 5 percent finders fee commission on the purchase and selling price of Curlin and other racehorses, as well as other breeding rights.

On December 20, 2007, Stonestreet announced the private purchase of George Bolton's 20% stake in Curlin. The sale leaves Stonestreet Stables' Jess Jackson and his wife, Barbara Banke, as co-owners of 80% of Curlin and the balance held by Midnight Cry Stables, which was tied up in a legal battle involving 418 people suing the horse's original owners over a legal settlement.

On January 22, 2008, Senior Judge Roger Crittenden in a one-sentence statement overruled the foreclosure motion filed by the plaintiffs against their former attorneys for alleged mishandling their settlement in the fen-phen lawsuit. The Blood Horse magazine further reported that according to attorneys representing Stonestreet Stable, they have "a first-right-of-refusal clause incorporated into the original sales agreement with Midnight Cry", should ever such a motion be ordered.

In May 2015, a 20% share of Curlin was auctioned off for over $6 million. This was the share that had belonged to Cunningham and Gallion, which was seized to help cover the restitution they owed their former clients. The buyer was Hill 'n' Dale Equine Holdings Inc. and Elevage II.

== Racing career ==
=== 2007: 3-year-old season ===
Curlin was conditioned for racing by Helen Pitts. Unraced at age two, in February 2007 he won a seven-furlong maiden race for three-year-olds by 12 3/4 lengths at Gulfstream Park in Florida, after which he was purchased by a racing partnership headed by majority shareholder Jess Jackson of Stonestreet Farm. The partnership also included Padua Stables, George Bolton, and Midnight Cry Stables, Curlin's original owner. The new owners turned the colt over to trainer Steve Asmussen. Curlin went on to race at Oaklawn Park in Arkansas where in March, jockey Robby Albarado rode him to victory in the Rebel Stakes, and, in mid April, in the Arkansas Derby.

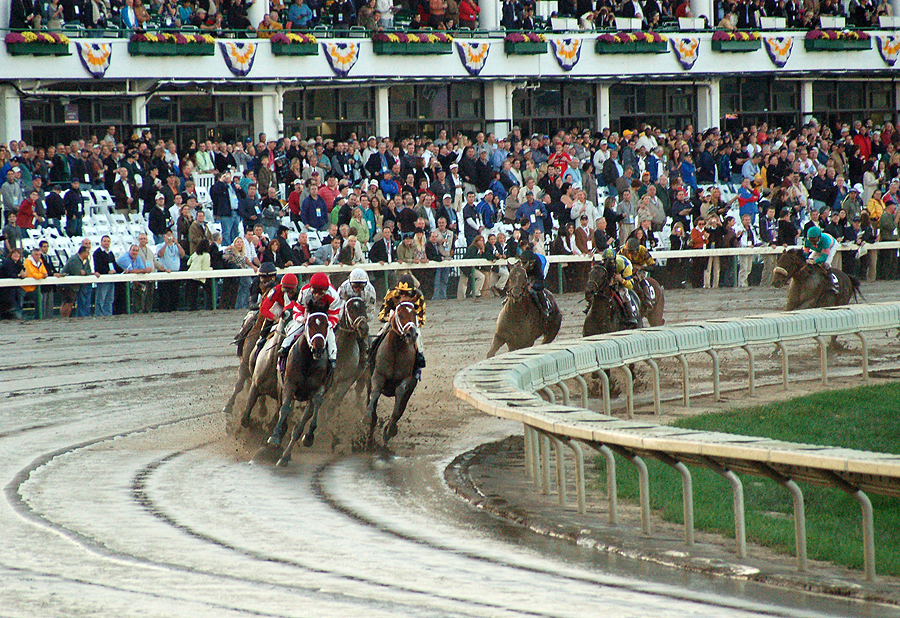
The first turn in the 2007 Breeders' Cup Classic.

Curlin was established as the morning-line favorite by Churchill Downs official handicapper Mike Battaglia at 7–2 in spite of the fact that no horse had won the Derby with only three prior starts since 1915 (Regret), and no horse had won with no two-year-old preps since 1882. He was the second betting choice when the race went off. Breaking from post 2 in a full field of 20, Curlin finished 3rd to Street Sense and Hard Spun. In the Preakness Stakes two weeks later, Curlin stumbled out of the gate and raced by the stands the first time in sixth, well off a hot early pace. As the leaders began to tire, he made a bold run on the far turn and entered the stretch four wide, opening the door for Street Sense to sneak by to his inside. With one furlong to go, Street Sense opened a length and a half lead. However, Curlin rallied to beat the Kentucky Derby winner in the final stride. His final time of 1:53.46, at the time, tied the track record set by Tank's Prospect in 1985, Louis Quatorze in 1996, and unofficially Secretariat in 1973 (Secretariat's time was later officially determined to be 1:53.00). Curlin was the even-money favorite in the Belmont Stakes. He engaged the champion filly Rags to Riches in a lengthy stretch duel and lost by a head. Rags to Riches was the first filly to win the Belmont Stakes in over a century.

Curlin was sent off as the favorite in the $1 million Haskell Invitational at Monmouth Park on August 5, 2007, and placed 3rd behind Any Given Saturday and Hard Spun, paying $2.10 to show on a fast track. The winning time was 1:48:35. Ridden by Robby Albarado, on September 30, he beat Lawyer Ron by a neck in a stretch duel in the Grade I Jockey Club Gold Cup at Belmont Park in a time of 2:01:20 with a Beyer rating of 114. As the Gold Cup is a Breeders' Cup Challenge race, the win earned him an automatic berth into the Breeders Cup Classic.

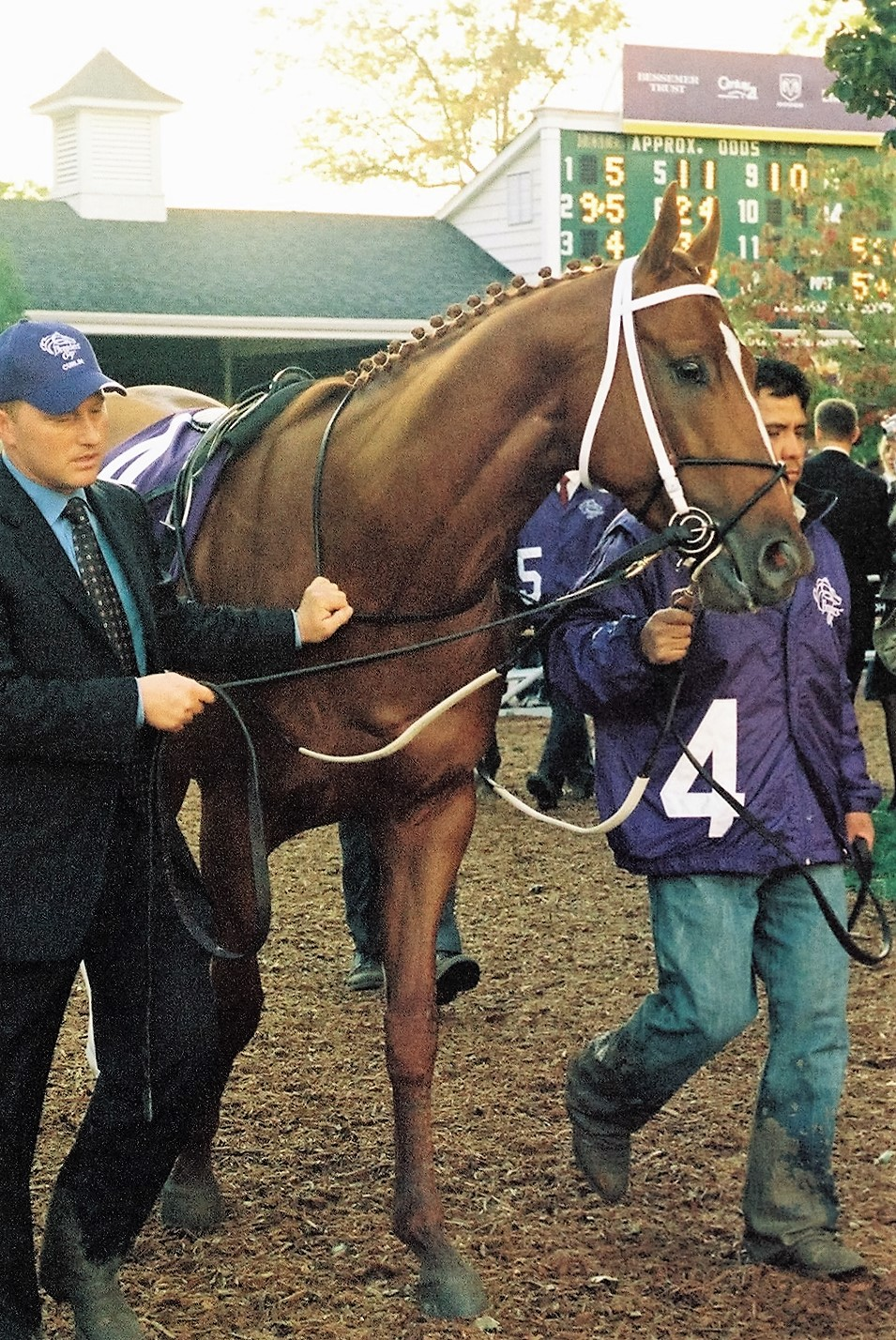
Curlin at the 2007 Breeders Cup

On October 27, 2007, Curlin went off as the 4th betting choice in the Breeders' Cup Classic held at Monmouth Park Racetrack in Oceanport, New Jersey. The condition was listed as sloppy on the main track after several days of rain. Emerging from about midpack in the field of nine, Curlin overtook pace setter Hard Spun at the top of the stretch and drew away to win the 24th running of the Classic by 4 3/4 lengths over Hard Spun. The race was the eighth time that a 3-year-old took the Classic. Curlin covered the 1 1/4 mile distance in 2:00.59, which is considered a fast time on a sloppy track, earning a Beyer rating of 119. By comparison, the Monmouth track record is 2:00.40 set in 1962 by Carry Back.

After his three-year-old campaign, Curlin was honored as the 2007 Horse of the Year as well as Three Year Old of the Year, defeating rivals Street Sense and Hard Spun.

Curlin repeated as the Eclipse Award American Horse of the Year for 2008, becoming only the fifth horse to do so and putting him in the company of the likes of Secretariat and Forego. He also was named the American Champion Older Male Horse for 2008.

=== 2008: 4-year-old season ===
Curlin began his four-year-old campaign in Dubai at the Nad Al Sheba Racecourse, running in the Jaguar Trophy Handicap as preparation for the Group I Dubai World Cup. He defeated a field of five by 2 1/4 lengths under a hand ride in 2:00.60

Curlin was sent out as the odds-on favorite for the Dubai World Cup. Drawing post 12, he ran three-wide outside of the leaders for the majority of the race before clearing the field when they reached the straight, winning by 7 3/4 lengths. He also became the only horse in Dubai World Cup history to win from the 12th post position. His official winning time was initially listed by the Dubai Racing Commission as 2:00.15, which would have been the third fastest in the race's history behind Dubai Millennium and Invasor. However, that time has since been removed after an investigation by the DRC sparked by reports by The Racing Post that their timing experts showed multiple races on the card – including Curlin in DWC – as being slower than officially reported. The Racing Post claims that five of the six Thoroughbred races, the Godolphin Mile being the exception, went a full second slower than the official timings.

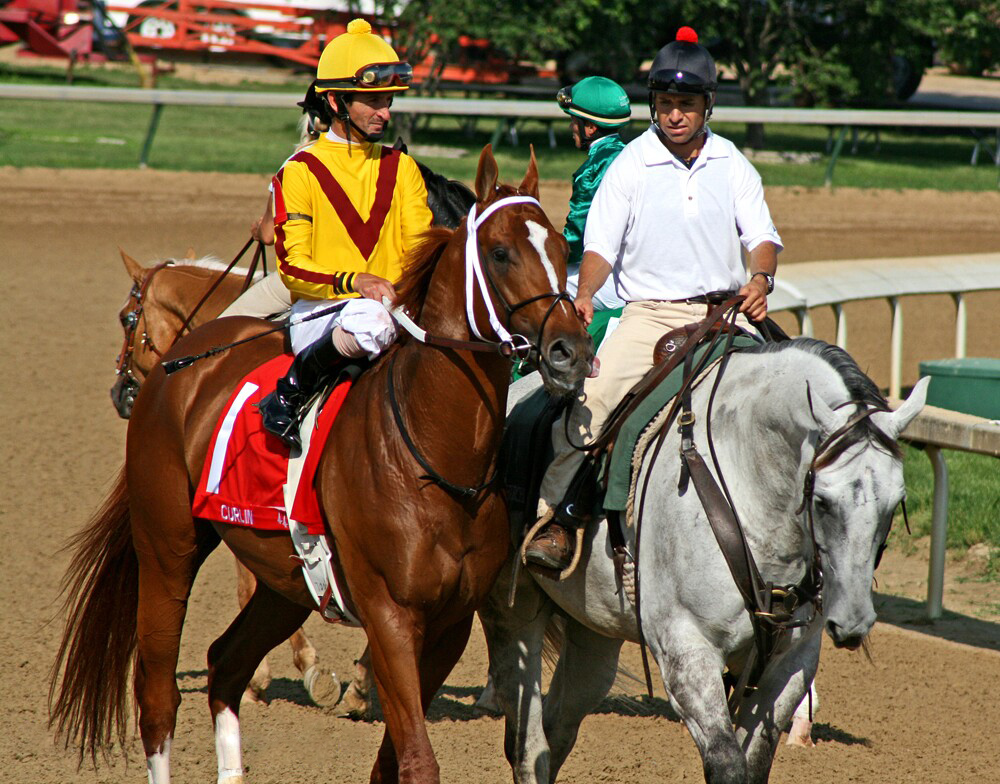
Curlin in 2008 Stephen Foster Handicap

On June 14, 2008, Curlin won his third start of the year, the Stephen Foster Handicap at Churchill Downs. He won by 4 1/4 lengths carrying 128 pounds (10 pounds more than the next highest weighted horse). On July 12, 2008, Curlin finished second, two lengths behind Red Rocks in the Grade I $500,000 Man o' War Stakes at Belmont Park. The turf race, with a field of seven, was run over the distance of 1 3/8 miles. Curlin carried 116 lbs, as did Red Rocks, while 3rd place runner Better Talk Now, a previous Breeders' Cup Turf winner, toted 120 lbs. Curlin was sent off in this maiden turf run by punters as the odds-on 2–5 favorite and a crowd of 8,428 was on hand to watch the race. On August 30, Curlin won the Woodward Stakes at Saratoga by one and a quarter lengths. However, after fast early fractions for the first mile, the final eighth of the race was run in a slower 14.01 seconds. On September 27, 2008, Curlin sent off as the 2–5 favorite and won his second consecutive Jockey Club Gold Cup, in a hand ride by three-quarters of a length over Wanderin Boy, earning a Beyer Speed figure of 111. The track was sealed and the final time was 2:01.93 was over a sloppy track.

The victory vaulted him past Cigar to become the No. 1 all-time North American money earner as defined as having at least one North American start. Curlin is the first North American runner to have earned over US$10 million. Curlin finished fourth in the 2008 Breeders' Cup Classic. Previously, trainer Steve Asmussen had expressed concern about running him in the Classic because of the Pro-Ride synthetic dirt at the 2008 host track, Santa Anita Park. Jockey Robby Albarado made what BreedersCup.com announcers described as an "early" move from near the back of the pack. Curlin blew by the frontrunners at the far turn but was overtaken in the stretch by eventual winner Raven's Pass, second-place finisher Henrythenavigator, and the late-charging Tiago.

On November 21, Curlin's owners announced that he would begin his stud career in 2009 at Lane's End in Versailles, Kentucky, for an initial fee of $75,000. Curlin was retired and paraded at Churchill Downs on November 29, 2008.

On January 26, 2009, Curlin won the Eclipse Award for older male horse of the year and for the second year in a row was named Horse of the Year. He joined Secretariat, Forego, Affirmed and Cigar as the only horses to win the award consecutively since the Eclipse Awards began in 1971.

== Racing statistics ==
Date	Race	Racecourse	Grade	Distance	Finish	Margin	Time	Weight	Odds	Jockey	Ref
Feb 3, 2007	Maiden	Gulfstream Park		7 Furlongs	1	12 3/4 lengths	1:22.25	122 lbs	2.00*	Rafael Bejarano	
Mar 17, 2007	Rebel Stakes	Oaklawn Park	||	1 1/16 miles	1	5 1/4 lengths	1:44.70	117 lbs	2.70	Robby Albarado	
Apr 14, 2007	Arkansas Derby	Oaklawn Park	|	1 1/8 miles	1	10 1/2 lengths	1:50.09	122 lbs	0.80*	Robby Albarado	
May 5, 2007	Kentucky Derby	Churchill Downs	|	1 1/4 miles	3	(8 lengths)	2:02.17	126 lbs	5.00	Robby Albarado	
May 19, 2007	Preakness Stakes	Pimlico Race Course	|	1 3/16 miles	1	head	1:53.46	126 lbs	3.40	Robby Albarado	
Jun 9, 2007	Belmont Stakes	Belmont Park	|	1 1/2 miles	2	(head)	2:28.74	126 lbs	1.10*	Robby Albarado	
Aug 5, 2007	Haskell Invitational Stakes	Monmouth Park Racetrack	|	1 1/8 miles	3	(4 3/4 lengths)	1:48.32	122 lbs	0.90*	Robby Albarado	
Sep 30, 2007	Jockey Club Gold Cup	Belmont Park	|	1 1/4 miles	1	neck	2:01.20	122 lbs	2.10	Robby Albarado	
Oct 27, 2007	Breeders' Cup Classic	Monmouth Park Racetrack	|	1 1/4 miles	1	4 1/2 lengths	2:00.59	121 lbs	4.40	Robby Albarado	
Feb 28, 2008	Jaguar Trophy Handicap	Nad Al Sheba Racecourse	||	1 1/4 miles	1	2 1/4 lengths	2:00.60	132 lbs	3/10*	Robby Albarado	
Mar 29, 2008	Dubai World Cup	Nad Al Sheba Racecourse	|	1 1/4 miles	1	7 3/4 lengths	2:01.15	126 lbs	4/11*	Robby Albarado	
Jun 14, 2008	Stephen Foster Handicap	Churchill Downs	|	1 1/8 miles	1	4 1/4 lengths	1:49.68	128 lbs	0.40*	Robby Albarado	
Jul 12, 2008	Man o' War Stakes	Belmont Park	|	1 3/8 miles	2	(2 lengths)	2:12.60	116 lbs	0.45*	Robby Albarado	
Aug 30, 2008	Woodward Stakes	Saratoga Race Course	|	1 1/8 miles	1	1 1/4 lengths	1:49.34	126 lbs	0.35*	Robby Albarado	
Sep 27, 2008	Jockey Club Gold Cup	Belmont Park	|	1 1/4 miles	1	3/4 length	2:01.93	126 lbs	0.40*	Robby Albarado	
Oct 25, 2008	Breeders' Cup Classic	Santa Anita	|	1 1/4 miles	4	2 3/4 length	1:59.27	126 lbs	0.90*	Robby Albarado	

== Stud career ==
Curlin covered 131 mares in the 2009 breeding season. The first foal he sired, a filly out of Zophie (Hawkster), was born on January 12, 2010, and was euthanized on January 29 after a paddock accident. Among other mares, Curlin was bred to the 2009 American Horse of the Year, Rachel Alexandra. During the broadcast of the 2011 Kentucky Derby, it was announced that Rachel Alexandra was expecting a foal, due around February 2012. A bay colt later named Jess's Dream was born on January 22, 2012, and won his first race on August 24, 2015.

Curlin was the leading third crop sire in North America in 2014. On September 2, 2015, Stonestreet Farm announced that he would stand the 2016 breeding season at Hill 'n' Dale Farm. Though his offspring tend to be somewhat slow to mature, Curlin is now regarded as a source of classic stamina.

In 2016, Curlin finished second on the North American general sire list. His stud fee for 2017 was increased to $150,000.

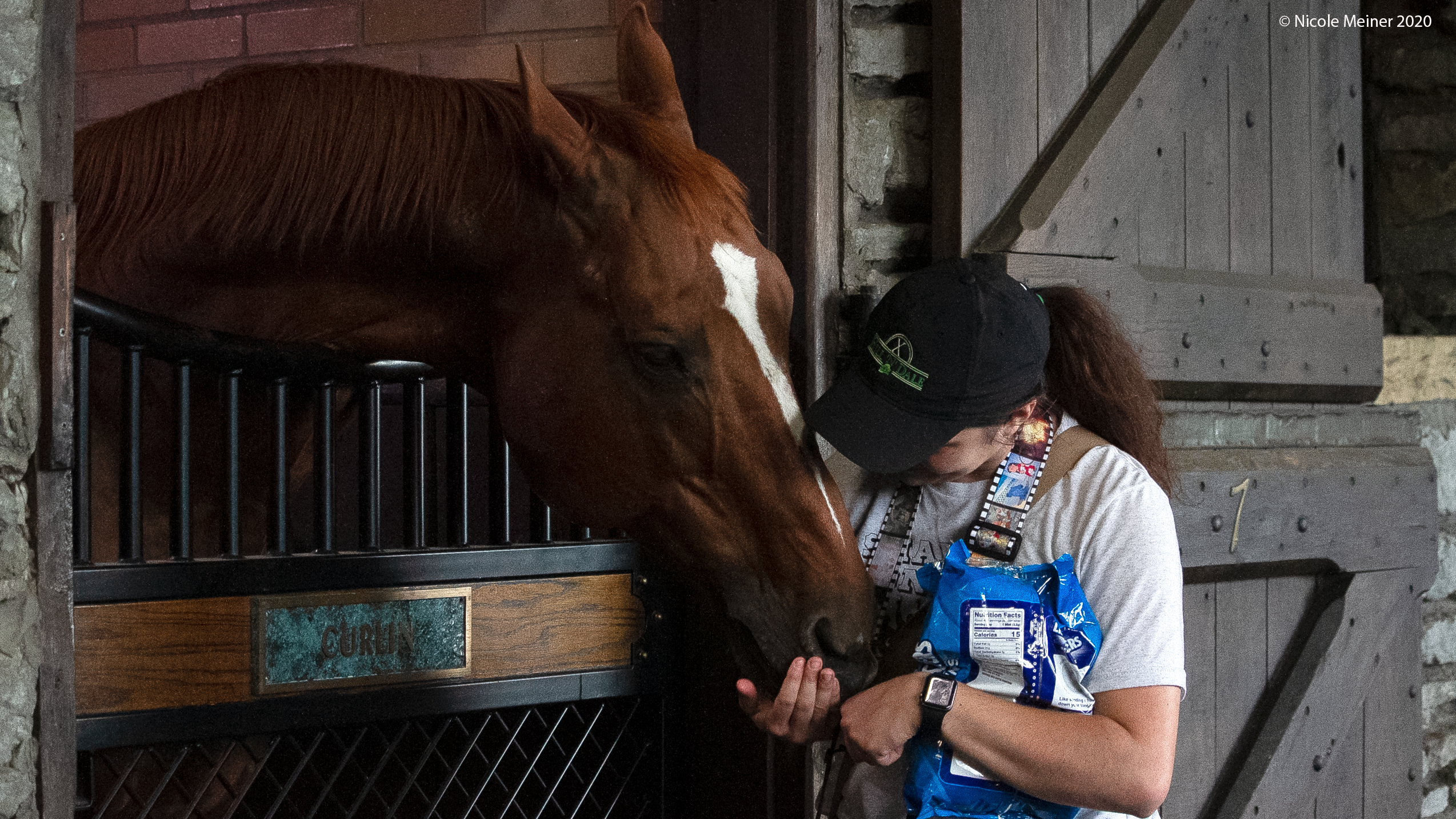
Curlin and his groom, Christina Zurick, at Hill N' Dale at Xalapa in 2020.

In 2022 Curlin's fee at Hill 'n' Dale Farm was $175,000. He was the leading sire at the 2022 Breeders' Cup with three winners on the Saturday card: Malathaat in the Distaff, Cody's Wish in the Dirt Mile, and Elite Power in the Sprint. At the end of that year, Malathaat won the champion older dirt female Eclipse award for her 2022 campaign, Elite Power won champion sprinter for winning 5 out of 6, and multiple grade 1 winner Nest, who also finished second in the Belmont Stakes, won the Champion 3-year-old-filly Eclipse award. Curlin is the first sire in the 52 years of the Eclipse awards to be represented by three different champions. His 2023 stud fee increased to $225,000 after the Breeder's Cup and Eclipse award success. After the 2023 Breeder's Cup results where Idiomatic, Cody's Wish, and Elite Power won their respective races, his 2024 stud fee jumped to $250,000.

His biggest stamp as a sire of runners came at the end of the racing season in 2023, when three of his offspring won individual Eclipse Awards, making him the first sire to achieve that feat as well. His 2025 stud fee was announced at $225,000 for the 20-year-old stallion, and it remained at that level for 2026. At the 2026 Kentucky Derby, Curlin was the sire of first-place Golden Tempo, the damsire (through his daughter Spice is Nice) of second-place Renegade, and the grandsire (through his son Connect) of third-place Ocelli. Golden Tempo and Renegade were also first and third at the 2026 Belmont Stakes.

In 2026, Curlin was relieved of stud duty due to declining fertility. His stud fee was marked private by Hill 'n' Dale Farm for 2027.

He has 20 sons standing at stud, with Good Magic having the best success so far with two 3-year-old G1 "Classic" winners in Mage (Kentucky Derby) and Dornoch (Belmont), who are full brothers. He also has G1 winners Mixto, Muth, and Blazing Sevens. His son Keen Ice sired the winner of the 2022 Kentucky Derby, Rich Strike.

=== Notable progeny ===
Curlin had produced 25 separate North American Grade 1 winners as of 10/2024:

'c = colt, f = filly, g = gelding

Foaled	Name	Sex	Major Wins
2010	Palace Malice	c	Belmont Stakes, Metropolitan Handicap
2012	Curalina	f	Acorn Stakes, Coaching Club American Oaks, La Troienne Stakes
2012	Keen Ice	c	Travers Stakes
2013	Connect	c	Cigar Mile
2013	Exaggerator	c	Preakness Stakes, Santa Anita Derby, Haskell Invitational
2013	Off the Tracks	f	Mother Goose Stakes
2015	Good Magic	c	Breeders' Cup Juvenile, Haskell Invitational
2015	Stellar Wind	f	Santa Anita Oaks, Clement L. Hirsch Stakes (2016, 2017), Zenyatta Stakes, Apple Blossom Handicap, Beholder Mile
2015	Vino Rosso	c	Gold Cup at Santa Anita, Breeders' Cup Classic
2016	Global Campaign	c	Woodward Stakes
2017	Idol	c	Santa Anita Handicap
2017	Paris Lights	f	Coaching Club American Oaks
2017	Awakened	g	Jonathan Sheppard Stakes (Steeplechase)
2018	Clairiere	f	Cotillion Stakes, Ogden Phipps Stakes (2022, 2023), Apple Blossom Handicap
2018	Cody's Wish	c	Forego Stakes, Breeders' Cup Dirt Mile (2022, 2023), Churchill Downs Stakes, Metropolitan Handicap
2018	Elite Power	c	Breeders' Cup Sprint (2022,2023), Alfred G. Vanderbilt Handicap
2018	Known Agenda	c	Florida Derby
2018	Malathaat	f	Ashland Stakes, Kentucky Oaks, Alabama Stakes, Personal Ensign Stakes, Spinster Stakes, Breeders' Cup Distaff
2018	Obligatory	f	Derby City Distaff Stakes
2019	Bright Future	c	Jockey Club Gold Cup
2019	Grace Adler	f	Del Mar Debutante Stakes
2019	Idiomatic	f	Personal Ensign Stakes, Breeders' Cup Distaff, La Troienne Stakes, Spinster Stakes (2023 & 2024)
2019	Nest	f	Ashland Stakes, Coaching Club American Oaks, Alabama Stakes
2020	Raging Sea	f	Personal Ensign Stakes, La Troienne Stakes
2020	Highland Falls	c	Jockey Club Gold Cup
2022	Journalism	c	Santa Anita Derby, Preakness Stakes, Haskell Stakes
2023	Golden Tempo	c	Kentucky Derby, Belmont Stakes

Curlin also sired champion filly Rachel Alexandra's only son, Jess's Dream (aka Taco), who broke his maiden at Saratoga before being retired due to injury to stand at stud in Ocala, Florida. He sired his first graded stakes winner when his son Chess's Dream won the Grade 3 Kitten's Joy Stakes in January 2021. He also produced stakes winners Intrepid Daydream, Dreaming of Snow, Sweet Dani Girl, Chacalosa, Intrepid Dream, and Beth's Dream. Jess's Dream was retired from stud in Florida at the end of 2023, was gelded, and was being trained to be a track "pony" for Stonestreet when he developed unrelated laminitis and was humanely euthanized in early 2024.

== Pedigree ==
Pedigree of Curlin
Sire Smart Strike bay 1992	Mr. Prospector bay 1970	Raise A Native chestnut 1961	Native Dancer
Sire Smart Strike bay 1992	Mr. Prospector bay 1970	Raise A Native chestnut 1961	Raise You
Sire Smart Strike bay 1992	Mr. Prospector bay 1970	Gold Digger bay 1962	Nashua
Sire Smart Strike bay 1992	Mr. Prospector bay 1970	Gold Digger bay 1962	Sequence
Sire Smart Strike bay 1992	Classy 'n Smart bay 1981	Smarten bay 1976	Cyane
Sire Smart Strike bay 1992	Classy 'n Smart bay 1981	Smarten bay 1976	Smartaire
Sire Smart Strike bay 1992	Classy 'n Smart bay 1981	No Class bay 1974	Nodouble
Sire Smart Strike bay 1992	Classy 'n Smart bay 1981	No Class bay 1974	Classy Quillo
Dam Sherriff's Deputy bay 1994	Deputy Minister bay 1979	Vice Regent chestnut 1967	Northern Dancer
Dam Sherriff's Deputy bay 1994	Deputy Minister bay 1979	Vice Regent chestnut 1967	Victoria Regina
Dam Sherriff's Deputy bay 1994	Deputy Minister bay 1979	Mint Copy dark brown 1970	Bunty's Flight
Dam Sherriff's Deputy bay 1994	Deputy Minister bay 1979	Mint Copy dark brown 1970	Shakner
Dam Sherriff's Deputy bay 1994	Barbarika bay 1985	Bates Motel bay 1979	Sir Ivor
Dam Sherriff's Deputy bay 1994	Barbarika bay 1985	Bates Motel bay 1979	Sunday Purchase
Dam Sherriff's Deputy bay 1994	Barbarika bay 1985	War Exchange gray 1972	Wise Exchange
Dam Sherriff's Deputy bay 1994	Barbarika bay 1985	War Exchange gray 1972	Jungle War

== See also ==
- List of leading Thoroughbred racehorses
- List of racehorses
