= Stellar Wind (horse) =

American Thoroughbred racehorse

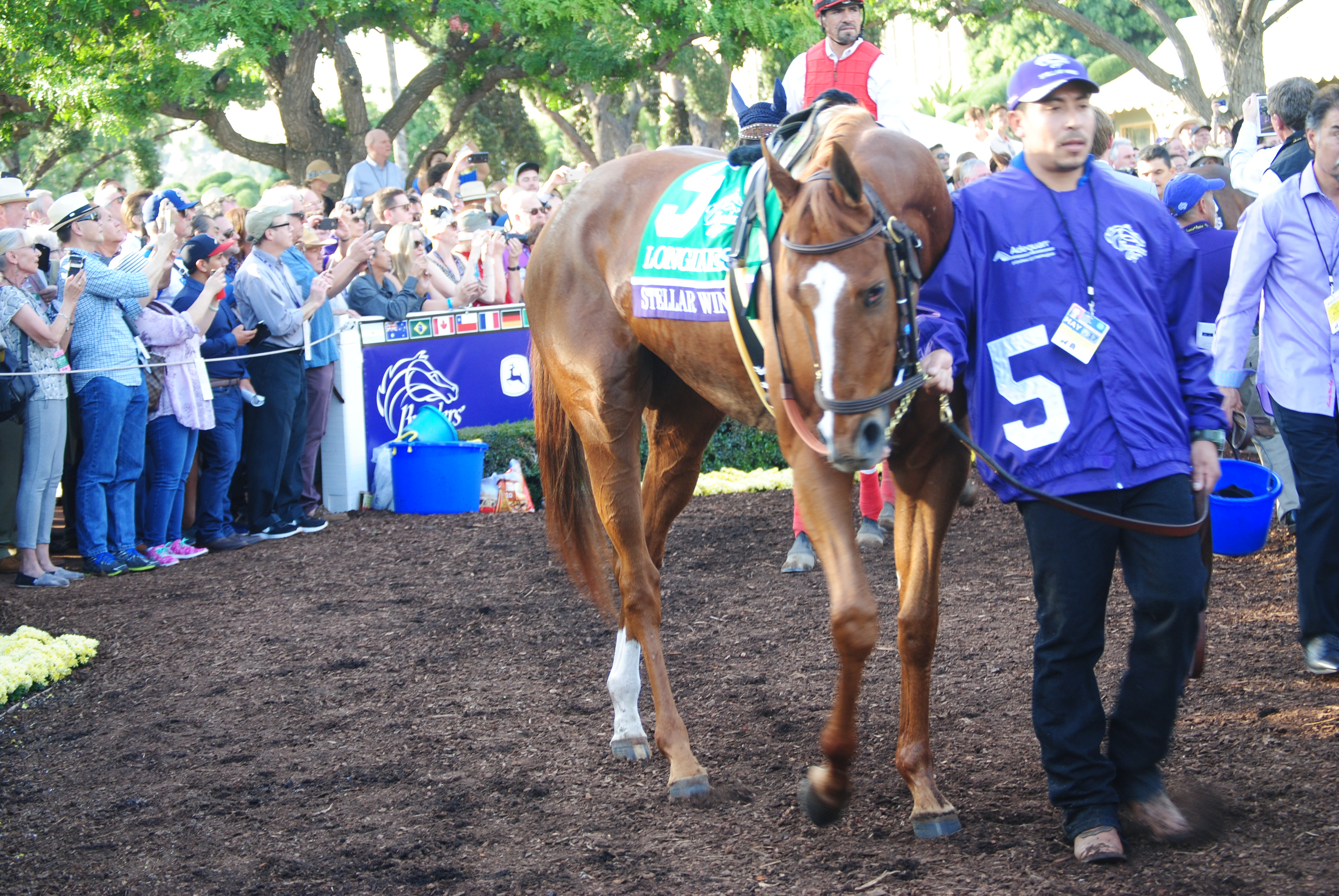
- Stellar Wind at the 2016 Breeders' Cup
- Sire: Curlin
- Grandsire: Smart Strike
- Dam: Evening Star
- Damsire: Malibu Moon
- Sex: Filly
- Foaled: February 13th, 2012
- Country: United States
- Colour: Chestnut
- Breeder: Keswick Stables & Stonestreet Thoroughbred Holdings
- Owner: Hronis Racing
- Trainer: Donald Barr (2014); John W. Sadler (2015–present)
- Record: 17: 10-2-1
- Earnings: $2,903,200

Major wins
- Santa Ysabel Stakes (2015); Santa Anita Oaks (2015); Summertime Oaks (2015); Torrey Pines Stakes (2015); Clement L. Hirsch Stakes (2016, 2017); Zenyatta Stakes (2016); Apple Blossom Handicap (2017); Beholder Mile Stakes (2017)

Awards
- American Champion Three-Year-Old Filly (2015)

Stellar Wind (foaled February 13, 2012) is an American Thoroughbred racehorse, known for her Eclipse Award winning three-year-old season, and later for her rivalry with the champion mare Beholder. Bred in Virginia, she raced in Maryland as a juvenile, winning one minor race from two starts. As a three-year-old, racing mainly in California, she improved to become arguably the best filly of her generation (in North America). In the spring of 2015, she won the Santa Ysabel Stakes and the Santa Anita Oaks before finishing a troubled fourth in the Kentucky Oaks. On her return to California, she recorded further victories in the Summertime Oaks and the Torrey Pines Stakes, and then ended her season by finishing a strong second in the Breeders' Cup Distaff. She was voted American Champion Three-Year-Old Filly of 2015.

At age four, Stellar Wind won two of her starts, beating Beholder in both the Clement L. Hirsch and Zenyatta while finishing second to her in the Vanity Mile and fourth in the Distaff. At age five, Stellar Wind won the Apple Blossom Handicap, the newly renamed Beholder Mile and the Clement L. Hirsch. Her only loss that year was in the Distaff, bringing her career record to 10 wins from 16 starts. She was sold as a broodmare prospect in November 2017 for $6 million.

== Background ==
Stellar Wind is a chestnut filly with a white blaze bred in Virginia by Keswick Stables & Stonestreet Thoroughbred Holdings. She is from the third crop of foals sired by Curlin, winner of the 2007 Preakness Stakes and Breeders' Cup Classic. Curlin's other offspring have included Palace Malice, Keen Ice, and Exaggerator. Stellar Wind was the first foal out of her dam Evening Star, who won two minor races as a four-year-old in 2010, and was descended from the mare Omayya, who was the ancestor of many important winners including Tepin, Americain and the Irish Oaks winner Melodist.

In August 2013, the filly was consigned by Bluegrass Thoroughbred Services to the Fasig-Tipton Saratoga Yearling Sale and was sold for $40,000 to Vernan Lee Stables. Less than two months later, the filly returned to the Fasig-Tipton auction ring and was bought for $88,000 by Barbara J. Houck. The filly was initially sent into training with Donald Barr.

== Racing career ==
=== 2014: two-year-old season ===
Stellar Wind made her first appearance in a maiden race at Laurel Park Racecourse on November 20, and finished third of the fourteen runners behind Spotted Heart and Gypsy Judy. Four weeks later, at the same track, she contested a similar event and recorded her first success as she drew away from her six rivals in the stretch to win by eight and three quarter lengths. After her win, she was privately purchased by bloodstock agent David Ingordo, on behalf of trainer John W. Sadler for Hronis Racing.

=== 2015: three-year-old season ===
For the 2015 season, Stellar Wind entered the ownership of Kostas Hronis' Hronis Racing, and was sent into training with John Sadler.

Stellar Wind began her three-year-old season with a step up in class, as she contested the Grade III Santa Ysabel Stakes over eight and a half furlongs at Santa Anita Park on February 25. Ridden for the first time by Victor Espinoza, she started at odds of 7/1 in a seven-horse field, headed by Light The City, who had finished second in the Grade I Las Virgenes Stakes in her previous start. The filly started slowly, but moved up on the outside on the final turn, took a narrow lead early in the stretch, and drew away in the final stages to win by two and three quarter lengths from Light The City. After the race, Espinoza commented: "I wanted to break and let her do whatever she wanted to do. I didn't want to irritate her, just make her happy. They slowed the pace down, so I had to move out a bit. They were walking up front, so I had to press the pace by the three-eighths pole. She was just waiting for me to command her".

On April 5, Stellar Wind moved up to Grade I level in the Santa Anita Oaks, which was run over the same track and distance as the Santa Ysabel Stakes. Light The City was again in opposition, but her main rival appeared to be the Bob Baffert-trained Luminance. Starting as the 6/5 favorite, Stellar Wind was restrained by Espinoza while at the rear of the seven-horse field, moved up on the outside approaching the final turn, took the lead a furlong and a half out, and won by five and a quarter lengths from Luminance, with Wild At Heart three lengths back in third. Following his filly's success, Kosta Hronis said "She looked good all the way around. She looked comfortable. I knew if she didn't get caught in traffic and she was sitting out it would be great. If you keep the best horse out of trouble, that's a good sign and Victor kept her out of trouble. I thought we maybe moved a little bit too early, but she's a really talented filly. She wasn't going to be caught today." Sadler stated: "She really wants more distance. This horse has a tremendous amount of stamina. It worked well last time. She broke a little slow in the Santa Ysabel and settled off kind of a slow pace, and so today, I said, 'I wouldn't change anything. Do what you've been doing.'".

On May 1, Stellar Wind started as the slight favorite in a fourteen-horse field for the Kentucky Oaks, which was contested over nine furlongs at Churchill Downs. She broke poorly and had to stay towards the rear of the field, but made steady progress while being forced to run nine horses wide on the final turn. She kept moving steadily, but never looked likely to win, and finished fourth, beaten 4 3/4 lengths by Lovely Maria, Shook Up, and I'm A Chatterbox. After the race, Espinoza stated: "She broke just a bit slow and that was a problem. I tried to stay up with the horse next to me, but we were getting outrun. Then when we went into the first turn and the dirt was flying back, she started jumping up and down. This just wasn’t her day." Sadler said: "She was way too far back. She was last around the first turn and the winners were all up close today so she never had any position. She just got banged up out of the gate. Sometimes you get a bad trip so there's nothing you can really do. We’ll take her back to California, freshen her up and then decide what to do next with her."

Her connections considered trying her on turf in the grade I Del Mar Oaks, but after an unsatisfactory turf workout, they announced she would stay on dirt. On June 20, Stellar Wind started in the Grade II Summertime Oaks at Santa Anita. She was the odds-on favorite, despite conceding five pounds to her opponents. She broke evenly, but had to go four wide on the first turn, and then settled into fourth. As the field moved into the far turn, she started moving up on the outside, but was matched by the gray filly Tara's Tango. Stellar Wind and Tara's Tango battled head and head down the stretch, but Stellar Wind prevailed to win by a nose.

Stellar Wind's next appearance came in the Grade III Torrey Pines Stakes at Del Mar Racetrack, on August 30. Starting as the odds-on favorite against five mediocre opponents, she broke slowly from the rail but was hustled up to second, which was closer to the pace then where she usually raced. She took the lead three furlongs out, and pulled clear in the stretch to win by four and a quarter lengths from Big Book.

For her final race of the year, Stellar Wind was matched against older fillies and mares for the first time in the Breeders' Cup Distaff at Keeneland on October 30. As in several of her previous starts, she was restrained by Espinoza before moving up on the outside on the final turn to challenge the leaders in the straight. In the closing stages she was bumped by the four-year-old Stopchargingmaria before finishing second by a neck to her older rival, with the pair finishing three and a half lengths clear of Curalina in third.

At the Eclipse Awards in January 2016 Stellar Wind was named American Champion Three-Year-Old Filly after taking 108 of the 261 votes, winning the award ahead of I'm A Chatterbox and Found.

=== 2016: four-year-old season ===
On her first appearance as a four-year-old, Stellar Wind was matched against the outstanding racemare Beholder in the Vanity Mile at Santa Anita on June 4 and finished second, a length and a half behind her older rival. Espinoza commented "She ran an awesome race, I expected her to run well, but not as well as she did today". On July 30, Stellar Wind faced Beholder again, this time in the Clement L. Hirsch at Del Mar, and turned the tables on the Champion mare to prevail in a thrilling stretch run. Following the Hirsch, Stellar Wind won the stretch war over Beholder yet again in the Zenyatta Stakes, taking victory by a neck.

After having won her last two match ups against Beholder, Stellar Wind was entered in the 2016 Breeders' Cup Distaff, to run again against Beholder and the undefeated filly Songbird. While the main focus was on Beholder and Songbird, every filly or mare in the race was a Grade I winner, including the Argentinean invader Corona Del Inca. Stellar Wind went off at odds of 5–2. the second betting choice, but lost her chances to race when she hopped coming out of the gate. She trailed throughout, but gained ground towards the end of the race and rallied to finish fourth behind Forever Unbridled, Songbird and Beholder.

Her owners originally planned to retire Stellar Wind and sell her at the November Fasig-Tipton sale as a broodmare prospect, but instead decided to keep her in training.

=== 2017: five-year-old season ===
Stellar Wind began her five-year-old season on April 14, 2017, in the Apple Blossom Handicap at Oaklawn Park in Arkansas, where she went off as the 2–5 favorite. Racing in fourth around the first turn, she improved her position down to the backstretch, and started her drive on the final turn. The early leader, Terra Promessa, tried to fight back but Stellar Wind wore her down in the stretch and won by 1 1/4 lengths.

She made her next start on June 3 in the Beholder Mile, formerly called the Vanity Mile. Her main rival was Vale Dori, who had one six straight races. Vale Dori went to the lead with Stellar Wind two lengths back entering the first turn. Espinoza then urged Stellar Wind alongside and the two mares dueled side by side. In deep stretch, Stellar Wind began to edge clear and won by a neck. "She's so game", said Kosta Hronis. "She's back. Our whole deal with bringing her back this year was if she was healthy and training well. Victor's early move here was the key to the race."

On July 30, the two mares met again in the Zenyatta Stakes, which was run in almost identical fashion with Stellar Wind again prevailing by a neck. Sadler then decided to skip the Zenyatta Stakes and train straight up to the Breeders' Cup on November 3. "I didn’t want a tough race so close to the big one", he said. "She runs well fresh, and she's undefeated at Del Mar, so we’re just focused on the big one." However, Stellar Wind finished last in the Distaff after fading in the stretch.

2018: Six-Year-Old Season

Stellar Wind made one start at six, in the $16,000,000 Grade 1 Pegasus World Cup Invitational for Coolmore Stud. Her trip was filled with trouble and she finished a distant sixth.

=== Race record ===
Date	Track	Race	Grade	Distance	Finish	Margin	Time	Odds
01/27/2018	Gulfstreak Park	Pegasus World Cup Invitational	I	1 1/8 miles	6th	16 1/4 lengths	1:47.41	40.70
11/03/2017	Del Mar racetrack	Breeders' Cup Distaff	I	1 1/8 miles	8	12 1/2	1:50.25	3.10
07/30/2017	Del Mar racetrack	Clement L. Hirsch Stakes	I	1 1/16 miles	1st	Neck	1:43.92	*0.50
06/03/2017	Santa Anita Park	Beholder Mile Stakes	I	1 mile	1st	Neck	1:36.14	*0.50
04/14/2017	Oaklawn Park	Apple Blossom Handicap	I	1 1/16 miles	1st	1 1/4 lengths	1:42.75	*0.40
11/14/2016	Santa Anita Park	Breeders' Cup Distaff	I	1 1/8 miles	4th	3 3/4 lengths	1:49.20	2.50
10/01/2016	Santa Anita Park	Zenyatta Stakes	I	1 1/16 miles	1st	Neck	1:41.80	2.00
07/30/2016	Del Mar racetrack	Clement L. Hirsch Stakes	I	1 1/16 miles	1st	1/2 length	1:41.24	4.50
06/04/2016	Santa Anita Park	Vanity Mile	I	1 mile	2nd	1 1/2 length	1:35.97	3.00
10/30/2015	Keeneland Race Course	Breeders' Cup Distaff	I	1 1/8 miles	2nd	Neck	1:48.98	7.20
08/30/2015	Del Mar racetrack	Torrey Pines Stakes	III	1 mile	1st	4 3/4 length	1:36.43	*0.50
06/20/2015	Santa Anita Park	Summertime Oaks	II	1 1/16 miles	1st	Nose	1:42.53	*0.40
05/01/2015	Churchill Downs	Kentucky Oaks	I	1 1/8 miles	4th	4 3/4 lengths	1:50.45	*3.20
04/04/2015	Santa Anita Park	Santa Anita Oaks	I	1 1/16 miles	1st	5 1/4 lengths	1:43.26	*1.20
02/28/2015	Santa Anita Park	Santa Ysabel Stakes	III	1 1/16 miles	1st	2 3/4 lengths	1:43.16	7.00
12/18/2014	Laurel Park	Maiden Special Weight	x	1 mile	1st	8 3/4 lengths	1:38.55	2.00
11/20/2014	Laurel Park	Maiden Special Weight	x	6 furlongs	3rd	3/4 lengths	1:11.98	6.20

Source: Equibase charts

== Retirement ==
Just days after the Distaff, Stellar Wind was sold at the Keeneland November Sales for $6 million to representatives of Coolmore Stud. She will be bred to Galileo in 2018. Stellar Wind Exported to Ireland, to be Bred to Galileo.

== Pedigree ==
Pedigree of Stellar Wind (USA), chestnut filly, 2012
Sire Curlin (USA) 2004	Smart Strike (CAN); 1992	Mr. Prospector	Raise a Native
Sire Curlin (USA) 2004	Smart Strike (CAN); 1992	Mr. Prospector	Gold Digger
Sire Curlin (USA) 2004	Smart Strike (CAN); 1992	Classy 'n Smart	Smarten
Sire Curlin (USA) 2004	Smart Strike (CAN); 1992	Classy 'n Smart	No Class
Sire Curlin (USA) 2004	Sheriff's Deputy (USA); 1994	Deputy Minister	Vice Regent
Sire Curlin (USA) 2004	Sheriff's Deputy (USA); 1994	Deputy Minister	Mint Copy
Sire Curlin (USA) 2004	Sheriff's Deputy (USA); 1994	Barbarika	Bates Motel
Sire Curlin (USA) 2004	Sheriff's Deputy (USA); 1994	Barbarika	War Exchange
Dam Evening Star (USA) 2006	Malibu Moon (USA); 1997	A.P. Indy	Seattle Slew
Dam Evening Star (USA) 2006	Malibu Moon (USA); 1997	A.P. Indy	Weekend Surprise
Dam Evening Star (USA) 2006	Malibu Moon (USA); 1997	Macoumba	Mr. Prospector
Dam Evening Star (USA) 2006	Malibu Moon (USA); 1997	Macoumba	Maximova
Dam Evening Star (USA) 2006	Sequins (USA); 1987	Northern Fashion	Northern Dancer
Dam Evening Star (USA) 2006	Sequins (USA); 1987	Northern Fashion	Fashionable Trick
Dam Evening Star (USA) 2006	Sequins (USA); 1987	Brilliant Touch	Gleaming
Dam Evening Star (USA) 2006	Sequins (USA); 1987	Brilliant Touch	Indian Nurse (Family: 1-n)

- Stellar Wind is inbred 3 × 4 to Mr. Prospector, meaning that this stallion appears in both the third and fourth generation of her pedigree.
