= Bates Motel (horse) =

American-bred Thoroughbred racehorse

- Racing silks of Jacqueline Getty Phillips
- Sire: Sir Ivor
- Grandsire: Sir Gaylord
- Dam: Sunday Purchase
- Damsire: T.V. Lark
- Sex: Stallion
- Foaled: 1979
- Country: United States
- Colour: Bay
- Breeder: Jacqueline Getty Phillips & Michael D. Riordan
- Owner: Jacqueline Getty Phillips & Michael D. Riordan
- Trainer: John H. M. Gosden
- Record: 19: 9-1-4
- Earnings: US$851,050

Major wins
- San Mateo County Sophomore Handicap (1982); Santa Anita Handicap (1983); San Antonio Handicap (1983); Monmouth Handicap (1983); San Diego Handicap (1983)

Awards
- American Champion Older Male Horse (1983)

Bates Motel (May 17, 1979 – October 12, 2004) was an American Thoroughbred racehorse who was voted an Eclipse Award in 1983 for American Champion Older Male Horse.

== Background ==
Bred by Jacqueline Getty Phillips and her son, Michael D. Riordan, Bates Motel was foaled in Kentucky and was sent by his breeder/owners in October 1980 to the annual auction at Newmarket in England. Because there were no buyers willing to meet the reserve price which they had set at about US$80,000, his owners decided to race him in the United States.

Named for the Bates Motel in the 1960 Alfred Hitchcock film Psycho, the colt was conditioned by English-born trainer John Gosden.

== Racing career ==
Based in California, he did not race at age two. He was a minor stakes winner at three and as a four-year-old had a championship year in 1983 during which he counted among his victories three Grade I stakes, including California's richest and most prestigious race for older horses, the Santa Anita Handicap. During the year, a share of the horse was sold to the prominent Kentucky breeder John R. Gaines, the then-owner of Gainesway Farm near Lexington.

== Stud record ==
Retired to stud duty beginning with the 1984 season, among his offspring, Bates Motel sired multiple stakes winner Packett's Landing, Private School, and Rare Blend, plus Canadian Oaks winner Blondeinamotel and Batuka, a Peruvian Horse of the Year and Champion Three-Year-Old filly. He also was the sire of the mare Barbarika, dam of Sherriff's Deputy, who in turn was the dam of two-time American Horse of the Year Curlin. Pensioned in 2003, Bates Motel was humanely euthanized at Gainesway Farm on October 12, 2004, due to the infirmities of old age.

== Pedigree ==
Pedigree of Bates Motel
Sire Sir Ivor	Sir Gaylord	Turn-To	Royal Charger
Sire Sir Ivor	Sir Gaylord	Turn-To	Source Sucree
Sire Sir Ivor	Sir Gaylord	Somethingroyal	Princequillo
Sire Sir Ivor	Sir Gaylord	Somethingroyal	Imperatrice
Sire Sir Ivor	Attica	Mr. Trouble	Mahmoud
Sire Sir Ivor	Attica	Mr. Trouble	Motto
Sire Sir Ivor	Attica	Athenia	Pharamond
Sire Sir Ivor	Attica	Athenia	Salaminia
Dam Sunday Purchase	T.V. Lark	Indian Hemp	Nasrullah
Dam Sunday Purchase	T.V. Lark	Indian Hemp	Sabzy
Dam Sunday Purchase	T.V. Lark	Miss Larksfly	Heelfly
Dam Sunday Purchase	T.V. Lark	Miss Larksfly	Larksnest
Dam Sunday Purchase	Dame Fritchie	Count of Honor	Count Fleet
Dam Sunday Purchase	Dame Fritchie	Count of Honor	Honor Bound
Dam Sunday Purchase	Dame Fritchie	So Proudley	Bull Dog
Dam Sunday Purchase	Dame Fritchie	So Proudley	At Top
