= Rich Strike =

American-bred Thoroughbred racehorse

- Sire: Keen Ice
- Grandsire: Curlin
- Dam: Gold Strike
- Damsire: Smart Strike
- Sex: Stallion
- Foaled: April 25, 2019 (age 7)
- Country: United States
- Color: Chestnut
- Breeder: Calumet Farm
- Owner: Calumet Farm (until September 2021); RED TR-Racing (Richard Dawson) (from September 2021)
- Trainer: Joe Sharp (until September 2021); Eric Reed (September 2021–May 2023); William I. Mott (May 2023– )
- Record: 14: 2-1-3
- Earnings: $2,526,809

Major wins
- American Triple Crown wins: Kentucky Derby (2022)
- Last updated on May 25, 2023

Rich Strike (foaled April 25, 2019) is an American Thoroughbred racehorse that won the 2022 Kentucky Derby, racing at 80:1 odds.

Rich Strike is the second-biggest longshot to have won the Kentucky Derby after Donerail (91:1 odds) in 1913. He was not in the field until Ethereal Road was scratched the day before, with Rich Strike being added from the also-eligible list for the Derby. Owner Richard Dawson found out about the change just 30 seconds before the deadline.

== Background ==
Rich Strike, also known as Richie, is a chestnut stallion with a white blaze and white socks on his hind legs. He was bred at Calumet Farm in Kentucky and was foaled on April 25, 2019. His dam, Gold Strike by Smart Strike, was the Canadian Champion Three-Year-Old Filly of 2005; he was sired by Keen Ice, best known for defeating American Pharoah in the Travers Stakes. Rich Strike became Keen Ice's first Grade I winner and Calumet Farm's record tenth Kentucky Derby winner.

In September 2021, horse trainer Eric Reed, on behalf of Richard Dawson's RED-TR Racing, bought Rich Strike for $30,000 at a claiming race at Churchill Downs.

Jockey Sonny Leon rode Rich Strike to his victory in the 148th Kentucky Derby at Churchill Downs on May 7, 2022.

Jerry Dixon Jr., who had been groom to the horse almost since his arrival at Eric Reed's training centre, was Rich Strike's groom at the Kentucky Derby.

== Racing career ==
=== 2021: two-year-old season ===
Originally trained by Joe Sharp, Rich Strike made his first start on August 15, 2021, in a maiden special weight race at one mile over the turf at Ellis Park. He broke slowly and was never a factor, finishing last.

For his next start, Rich Strike was dropped into a maiden claiming race at Churchill Downs. He broke slowly and raced near the back of the pack down the backstretch, then made a strong move on the turn to take the lead. He drew off down the stretch to win by 17 1/4 lengths. He was claimed for $30,000 by Eric Reed.

On October 9, Rich Strike was entered in an allowance optional claiming race at Keeneland. He bobbled at the start and had to be steadied entering the first turn after being bumped. He was well back for most of the race but started to close ground in the final furlong to finish third, beaten by 3 1/2 lengths.

Rich Strike made his final start of the year on December 26 in the Gun Runner Stakes at Fair Grounds Race Course in New Orleans. He trailed the field through the first three-quarters of a mile before making a mild rally to finish fifth behind Epicenter.

=== 2022: three-year-old season ===
Rich Strike made his three-year-old debut on January 22, 2022, in the Leonatus Stakes over the all weather surface at Turfway Park in Kentucky. As had become his pattern, he was well back in the early running then made a late run to finish third. Reed later commented that Rich Strike had lost several days of training while in New Orleans for the previous race because of weather. "In the paddock he was a monster and he's never like that," Reed said. "He didn't run terrible but he just wasn't himself."

He turned in a similar performance on March 5 in the John Battaglia Memorial Stakes, also at Turfway Park, this time finishing fourth.

For his third start of the year, Rich Strike was entered in the Jeff Ruby Stakes at Turfway on April 2. He was near the back of the field for most of the race but found an inside path in the stretch and closed well to finish third behind Tiz the Bomb.

==== Kentucky Derby ====
The third-place finish in the Jeff Ruby gave Rich Strike 20 points on the 2022 Road to the Kentucky Derby, which was originally short of the amount required to qualify for the race. At 8:45 a.m. on Friday, the day before the race, Reed was informed there were no scratches. However, the last-minute scratch of another horse, Ethereal Road, allowed him to draw into the Derby, and minutes later, Reed took another phone call from chief steward Barbara Borden, asking him if he wanted to run Rich Strike in the Derby. Reed joked that the last-minute notification left him needing cardiopulmonary resuscitation, as he had just been about to enter Rich Strike in another race, the Peter Pan Stakes at Belmont Park. "He's never been better; he loves this track," said Reed. "All week long, I was like, 'He just gets better every day.' He's so happy right now. It's just a blessing to be able to run."

The field for the 2022 Kentucky Derby, held on May 6, 2022, was considered one of the deepest in recent memory as there were multiple highly regarded horses but no clear standout. The top horses included Epicenter (Louisiana Derby, Risen Star), Zandon (Blue Grass Stakes), and Taiba (Santa Anita Derby). Rich Strike was overlooked at odds of 80:1. He broke well from the outside post position and settled into the back of the pack where he was in eighteenth place after the first half-mile, 17 lengths behind the leaders. During this time Summer is Tomorrow and Crown Pride battled up front starting the race off with an extremely fast pace. He started his move on the final turn while weaving through traffic, first shifting out four horses wide of the rail then back towards the rail. In the stretch, he was checked briefly by a tiring horse but again found racing room and launched a sustained drive to the inside of Epicenter. He drew clear in the final strides to win by three-quarters of a length. A shocked Reed collapsed in the paddock.

It was the first graded stakes win for jockey Sonny Leon, who was commended by Reed for an excellent ride. "You know we had a difficult post but I know the horse," said Leon. "I didn't know if he could win but I had a good feeling with him. I had to wait until the stretch and that's what I did. I waited and then the rail opened up. I wasn't nervous, I was excited. Nobody knows my horse like I know my horse."

After the Derby, on May 12, owner Dawson announced the horse would not run the Preakness Stakes on May 21, noting that while running the race was "very tempting", the team would stick with its original plan of passing on the Preakness after racing the Derby and entering the Belmont Stakes, thus giving up the chance to become the first Triple Crown winner since Justify in 2018.

==== Belmont Stakes ====
On 11 June, Rich Strike was entered in the Belmont Stakes and faced Todd Pletcher's pair of Mo Donegal and the filly Nest and five other horses. Rich Strike was the third betting choice in the field, starting at odds of just over 4:1. He broke in at the start, bumping Nest solidly after that rival stumbled and pinching her back, raced briefly inside into the first turn, then went two and then three wide and then back to the two path briefly into the backstretch, tipped out and chased four wide with 7 1/2 furlongs to go, continued four wide through the far turn, was coaxed along from the half-mile pole, swung four to five wide at the head of the stretch, and tired to finish sixth to winner Mo Donegal. Trainer Eric Reed commented after the race, "The pace was slow, but he had him where he wanted to be. He wasn't the same horse."

==== Travers Stakes ====
The Travers Stakes on August 27 attracted a very strong field, including the top three finishers in the Kentucky Derby (Rich Strike, Epicenter and Zandon), Preakness winner Early Voting and Cyberknife, who had won the Haskell in his last start. Rich Strike started at odds of nearly 11:1 broke in at the start, settled on the inside, was urged along passing the five-eighths pole, saved ground under strong urging on the far turn, shifted three to four wide into the stretch and just missed the third place behind by 5 1/2 lengths from winner Epicenter followed by Cyberknife, with Zandon in third place. After returning to his home base in Lexington, Kentucky, trainer Reed was pleased, commenting, "He ran great. I didn't think we were going to beat Epicenter, but I truly believe we were the second-best horse. He was second best. I was very proud of him. He showed tremendous courage around the turn. He lost ground at the quarter pole and he came back. You don't see a lot of horses lose ground in the stretch and then come back like he did. I had to live 10 weeks hoping I could get him the credibility he deserved. I think he should have gotten that Saturday."

==== Lukas Classic ====
On October 1, Rich Strike returned to Churchill Downs—where he had won his only races, including the Kentucky Derby—to face older horses for the first time, including Hot Rod Charlie, Art Collector, and Happy Saver, in the Grade II Lukas Classic Stakes. Starting as the 5/1 fourth choice, he settled behind leaders Art Collector and Hot Rod Charlie. He was two lengths off the early leaders after a half-mile. As the horses rounded the turn into the stretch, Rich Strike came four wide but seemed to relax somewhat upon making the lead at the sixteenth pole. He could have also grown a bit fatigued after racing closer to the leaders than usual in a race with little speed. Jockey Sonny Leon implored his mount to finish the race off with left-handed strikes in the closing sixteenth while working to maintain his balance, as his saddle may have slipped to the left. In the end, he fell short by inches to Hot Rod Charlie. Leon was suspended 15 days by the Churchill Downs stewards for "intentionally attempting to interfere with and impede the progress of a rival by repeatedly making physical contact with another rider in the stretch".

==== Breeders’ Cup Classic ====
On November 5, 2022, the Breeders’ Cup Classic was run on Keeneland Racetrack in Lexington, Kentucky. The field consisted of Flightline, Epicenter, Rich Strike, Hot Rod Charlie, Taiba, Life is Good, Olympiad, and Happy Saver. Many pundits had predicted that Flightline would win, and that proved to be so, with the horse finishing 8 1/4 lengths in front of Olympiad. Jockey Sonny Leon rode Rich Strike to a fourth-place finish behind Flightline, Olympiad, and Taiba. The colt seems to have been slowed by a faltering Epicenter, who suffered a career-ending injury. Dawson and Reed announced after the race that Rich Strike would likely now be rested to prepare for 2023.

==== Clark Stakes ====
Rich Strike ran in the Clark Stakes at Churchill Downs on Friday, November 22, 2022, on his reported favorite track for the 1 1/8 mile G1 race. The day before the race he was the favorite at 2:1 odds. It was his first 3-week turnaround. Sonny Leon rode. The horse did not do well, finished at the back of the pack. It was discovered post-race that he was quite ill. Rich Strike was treated for what trainer Eric Reed called a guttural pouch infection, and after recovery he was rested until mid-January 2023.

==== Year End 2022 ====
Trainer Eric Reed worked on a race plan for the next year, as Rich Strike rested at a bluegrass farm at the end of 2022, and enjoyed “just being a horse”. Reed stated that Rich Strike's 2022 team members would be in place for 2023, and “there is no plan to change them” — the Dixons, Leon, Lagune.

=== 2023: four-year-old season ===
Rich Strike returned to Eric Reed's Mercury Training Center in January, and began training for the 2023 season. He ran just once that year, finishing fifth in the Alysheba Stakes at Churchill.

On May 11, 2023, a few days after the Alysheba was run, Reed announced that he quit as the trainer for Rich Strike and all horses owned by RED-TR Racing in his care. His resignation came after it was announced that Reed had entered into an agreement with Omaha Productions, a production company headed by former NFL quarterback Peyton Manning, for an Amazon Prime documentary about his training career. RED-TR Racing's Rick Dawson claimed the promotional materials released about the project included parts about Rich Strike's story, which he said he owned the trademark and rights to. The two ultimately disagreed on their views of the film project, with Dawson saying that he felt obligated to protect Rich Strike's legacy, and Reed saying that he wanted to do what was best for his family. On May 25 it was announced that Bill Mott would take over the training duties. It was also reported that Rich Strike was being turned out and rested for 30 days.

== Retirement ==
In November 2023 Rick Dawson announced that Rich Strike would be retired from racing and entered into the November sales at Keeneland. Dawson later withdrew Rich Strike from the sale, however, saying that his colt would continue to undergo light training at Margaux Farm in Kentucky.

Rich Strike arrived at Bill Mott's barn at Saratoga Race Course in June 2024 for a potential five-year-old campaign. Owner Rick Dawson attributed his horse's absence from racing to leg issues. He added that Rich Strike was cleared by equine surgeon Dr. Larry Bramlage, and that his chances of returning to racing were "50-50." Two months later, however, Rich Strike suffered a torn ligament in his left foreleg. According to Dawson, the injury was unrelated to Rich Strike's previous leg issues, but would require additional rehabilitation for two months. He added that the chances of the horse returning to race had dropped to "five or ten percent."

In December 2024, Daily Racing Form reported that Dawson was looking to secure a domestic stud deal for Rich Strike for the 2025 breeding season. Later that month, The Blood-Horse reported that a deal was pending to have Rich Strike enter stud at Mountain Springs Farm in Palmyra, Pennsylvania.

In 2025 Rich Strike was standing stud at Irish Hill & Dutchess Views Stallions, Stillwater, New York for a $6,500 service fee.

== Statistics ==
Rich Strike race statistics
Date	Distance	Race	Grade	Track	Odds	Field	Finish	Winning time	Winning (Losing) margin	Jockey	Ref
2021 – Two-year-old season
Aug 15, 2021	1 mile	Maiden Special Weight		Ellis Park	4.70	10	10	1:39.52	(14 1/2 lengths)	Ricardo Santana Jr.	
Sep 17, 2021	1 mile	Maiden Claiming		Churchill Downs	10.30	11	1	1:36.84	17 1/4 lengths	Adam Beschizza	
Oct 9, 2021	1 mile	Allowance optional claiming		Keeneland	3.70	7	3	1:38.52	(3 1/2 lengths)	Julien Leparoux	
Dec 26, 2021	1 1/16 miles	Gun Runner Stakes		Fair Grounds	46.20	7	5	1:44.19	(14 lengths)	Ricardo Santana Jr.	
2022 – Three-year-old season
Jan 22, 2022	1 mile	Leonatus Stakes		Turfway Park	8.40	10	3	1:39.70	(3 1/4 lengths)	Sonny Leon	
Mar 5, 2022	1 1/16 miles	John Battaglia Memorial Stakes		Turfway Park	20.60	12	3	1:44.12	(3 lengths)	Sonny Leon	
Apr 2, 2022	1 1/8 miles	Jeff Ruby Steaks	III	Turfway Park	26.20	12	3	1:48.60	(5 3/4 lengths)	Sonny Leon	
May 7, 2022	1 1/4 miles	Kentucky Derby	I	Churchill Downs	80.80	20	1	2:02.61	3/4 length	Sonny Leon	
Jun 11, 2022	1 1/2 miles	Belmont Stakes	I	Belmont Park	4.10	8	6	2:28.28	(13 1/4 lengths)	Sonny Leon	
Aug 27, 2022	1 1/4 miles	Travers Stakes	I	Saratoga	10.90	8	4	2:00.72	(5 1/2 lengths)	Sonny Leon	
Oct 1, 2022	1 1/8 miles	Lukas Classic Stakes	II	Churchill Downs	4.86	6	2	1:49.77	(head)	Sonny Leon	
Nov 5, 2022	1 1/4 miles	Breeders' Cup Classic	I	Keeneland	24.61	8	4	2:00.05	(11 1/4 lengths)	Sonny Leon	
Nov 25, 2022	1 1/8 miles	Clark Stakes	II	Churchill Downs	2.44	6	6	1:48.89	(8 1/4 lengths)	Sonny Leon	
2023 – Four-year-old season
May 5, 2023	1 1/16 miles	Alysheba Stakes	II	Churchill Downs	9.72	6	5	1:41.29	(16 3/4 lengths)	Sonny Leon	

Legend:
All-weather track Dirt Turf

== Pedigree ==
Pedigree of Rich Strike, chestnut colt, foaled April 25, 2019
Sire Keen Ice (USA) 2012	Curlin (USA); 2004	Smart Strike*	Mr Prospector*^
Sire Keen Ice (USA) 2012	Curlin (USA); 2004	Smart Strike*	Classy 'n Smart*
Sire Keen Ice (USA) 2012	Curlin (USA); 2004	Sherriff's Deputy	Deputy Minister*
Sire Keen Ice (USA) 2012	Curlin (USA); 2004	Sherriff's Deputy	Barbarika
Sire Keen Ice (USA) 2012	Medomak (USA); 2007	Awesome Again	Deputy Minister*
Sire Keen Ice (USA) 2012	Medomak (USA); 2007	Awesome Again	Primal Force
Sire Keen Ice (USA) 2012	Medomak (USA); 2007	Wiscasset	Kris S.
Sire Keen Ice (USA) 2012	Medomak (USA); 2007	Wiscasset	Tara Roma
Dam Gold Strike (CAN) 2002	Smart Strike* (CAN); 1992	Mr Prospector*	Raise a Native
Dam Gold Strike (CAN) 2002	Smart Strike* (CAN); 1992	Mr Prospector*	Gold Digger*
Dam Gold Strike (CAN) 2002	Smart Strike* (CAN); 1992	Classy 'n Smart*	Smarten
Dam Gold Strike (CAN) 2002	Smart Strike* (CAN); 1992	Classy 'n Smart*	No Class
Dam Gold Strike (CAN) 2002	Brassy Gold (CAN); 1996	Dixieland Brass	Dixieland Band
Dam Gold Strike (CAN) 2002	Brassy Gold (CAN); 1996	Dixieland Brass	Windmill Gal
Dam Gold Strike (CAN) 2002	Brassy Gold (CAN); 1996	Panning For Gold	Search For Gold*^
Dam Gold Strike (CAN) 2002	Brassy Gold (CAN); 1996	Panning For Gold	Apple Pan Dowdy

* Rich Strike is inbred 3S x 2D to the stallion Smart Strike, meaning that he appears third generation on the sire side of his pedigree and second generation on the dam side of his pedigree.

* Rich Strike is inbred 4S x 4S to the stallion Deputy Minister, meaning that he appears fourth generation twice on the sire side of his pedigree.

*^ Rich Strike is inbred 5S x 4D x 5D to the mare Gold Digger, meaning that she appears fifth generation (via Mr Prospector)^ on the sire side of his pedigree and fourth and fifth generation (via Search For Gold)^ on the dam side of his pedigree.
