= Gold Strike (horse) =

Canadian-bred Thoroughbred racehorse

- Sire: Smart Strike
- Grandsire: Mr. Prospector
- Dam: Brassy Gold
- Damsire: Dixieland Brass
- Sex: Mare
- Foaled: 2002 (age 23–24)
- Country: Canada
- Colour: Dark Bay/Brown
- Breeder: Harlequin Ranches
- Owner: Harlequin Ranches
- Trainer: Blair Miller (2004); Reade Baker (2005/6)
- Record: 9: 4-3-1
- Earnings: Can$564,500

Major wins
- Buffalo Stakes (2004); Debutante Stakes (2004); Selene Stakes (2005); Woodbine Oaks (2005)

Awards
- CTHS Manitoba-bred Champion 2-Year-Old Filly (2004); CTHS Manitoba-bred Horse of the Year (2005); Canadian Champion 3-Year-Old Filly (2005)

Honours
- Gold Strike Mile at Assiniboia Downs

Gold Strike (foaled 2002 in Manitoba) is a Canadian Thoroughbred Champion racehorse. Bred and raced by Dick Bonnycastle's Harlequin Ranches, she was out of the mare, Brassy Gold. Her sire was the outstanding Smart Strike, a two-time leading sire in North America who also sired Curlin, Soaring Free, and English Channel, among others.

Gold Strike is the dam of 2022 Kentucky Derby winner Rich Strike.

== Racing career ==
At age two in 2004, Gold Strike raced at Assiniboia Downs in Winnipeg, Manitoba for trainer Blair Miller where she won two of her three starts. Her wins came in the Buffalo Stakes plus a 15¾ length romp in the Debutante Stakes. Voted the 2004 CTHS Manitoba-bred Champion 2-Year-Old Filly, in October of that year she was sent to Toronto's Woodbine Racetrack where her race conditioning for the 2005 campaign was handled by Reade Baker.

Racing at age three, Gold Strike was voted the 2005 Sovereign Award for Champion 3-Year-Old Filly following her wins in the Selene Stakes and Canada's most important race for three-year-old fillies, the Woodbine Oaks. Gold Strike also earned a third-place finish against a field of males in the 2005 Queen's Plate. In addition to her Sovereign Award, she was named the CTHS Manitoba-bred Horse of the Year. Gold Strike raced at age four with her best result a second in the Hendrie Stakes.

== Broodmare career ==
Retired to broodmare duty, in 2008 she produced her first foal named Lode Lady. In 2019 she foaled Rich Strike, who would win the 2022 Kentucky Derby.

== See also ==
Gold Strike's pedigree and partial racing stats
