= Eric Reed (horse trainer) =

American horse trainer

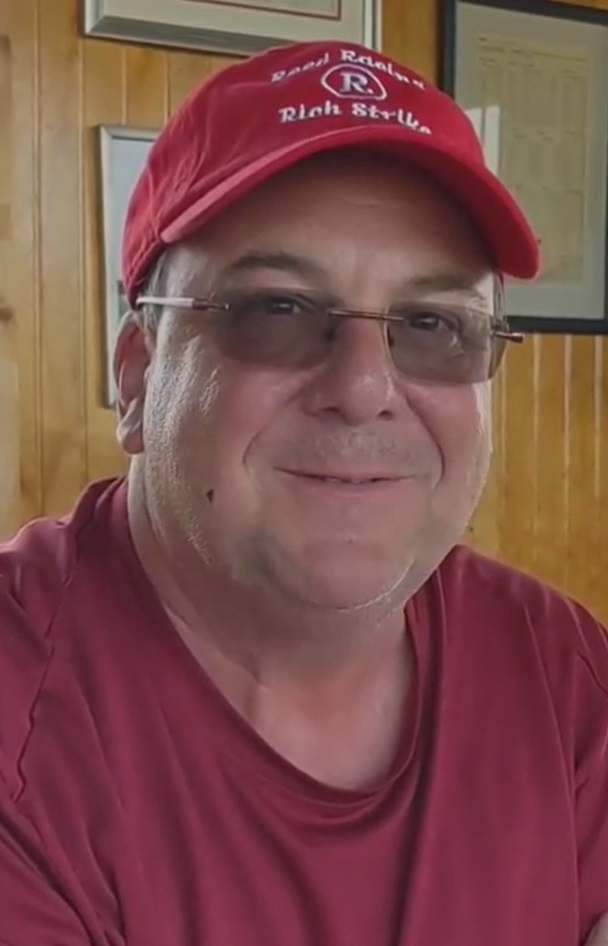
- Reed in 2022

Personal information
- Born: 1963 or 1964 (age 62–63)

Horse racing career
- Sport: Horse racing
- Career wins: 1,445+ (ongoing)

Major racing wins
- American Classics wins: Kentucky Derby (2022)

Significant horses
- Rich Strike, Satans Quick Chick

Eric Reed (born 1963 or 1964) is an American horse trainer. He is best known as the former trainer of Rich Strike, the winner of the 2022 Kentucky Derby.

== Early life ==
Reed's father, trainer Herbert Reed, was 16 years old when Eric was born. His father Herbert trained for over 40 years apprenticing under the guidance of Mack Miller. Eric has trained since 1983.

== Career ==
In 1986, Native Drummer provided Reed his first stakes win in the Forego Stakes at Latonia Race Track.

Reed is the owner of the Mercury Equine Center, a 60-acre thoroughbred training facility in Lexington, Kentucky. In 2016, a fire ravaged the center, killing dozens of horses. Reed believed that a lightning strike was the cause.

Rich Strike closed at 80-1 odds before the start of the 2022 Derby, the longest odds among all 20 horses. With Rich Strike's win, Reed won his first Kentucky Derby. This win in 2022 makes for the biggest underdog champion since the 1913 Kentucky Derby. With odds of 91–1, winning horse Donerail is the longest odds winner in Kentucky Derby history.

One year after Rich Strike's Kentucky Derby it was announced that Reed had entered into an agreement with Omaha Productions, a production company headed by former NFL quarterback Peyton Manning, for an Amazon Prime documentary about his training career. RED-TR Racing's Rick Dawson, owner of Rich Strike, took issue with what he claimed to be portions of promotional material released containing some of the horse's story, which he said he owned the trademark and rights to. On May 11, 2023, Reed quit as the trainer of Rich Strike and all RED-TR Racing horses in his care after receiving what he interpreted to be an ultimatum from Dawson, telling him to choose either the documentary or the horse. In the end, Reed said that he wanted to do what was best for his family, while Dawson said he felt obligated to protect Rich Strike's legacy.
