= Eric Reed =

Eric Reed may refer to:

- Eric Reed (musician) (born 1970), American jazz pianist and composer
- Eric Reed (baseball) (born 1980), American outfielder
- Eric Reed (soccer) (born 1983), American goalkeeper
- Eric Reed (horse trainer), American horse trainer

== See also ==
- Erik Read (born 1991), Canadian World Cup alpine ski racer
- Eric Reid (born 1991), American football safety
- Eric Reid (sportscaster), American play-by-play announcer since 1982
