= White Abarrio =

Winning racehorse (born 2019)

- White Abarrio in the paddock for the 2026 Stephen Foster Stakes.
- Sire: Race Day
- Grandsire: Tapit
- Dam: Catching Diamonds
- Damsire: Into Mischief
- Sex: Stallion
- Foaled: March 18, 2019 (age 7)
- Country: United States
- Color: Gray or Roan
- Breeder: Spendthrift Farm
- Owner: 1. Clap Embroidery (until Sept. 2021); 2. C2 Racing Stable & La Milagrosa Stable (Sept. 2021 – Sept. 2022); 3. C2 Racing Stable & Antonio Pagnano (Dec. 2022 – Feb 2024); 4. C2 Racing Stable, Prince Faisal bin Khaled bin Abdulaziz Al-Saud & Antonio Pagnano (Feb. 2024 - Jan 2025); 5. C2 Racing Stable, Gary Barber & Antonio Pagnano (Mar. 2025 -)
- Trainer: 1. Carlos Perez (until Sept. 2021); 2. Saffie Joseph Jr. (Oct. 2021 – May 2023); 3. Richard E. Dutrow Jr. (May 2023 – June 2024); 4. Saffie Joseph Jr. (June 2024 – August 2026)
- Record: 28: 11-3-3
- Earnings: $8,598,170

Major wins
- Holy Bull Stakes (2022); Florida Derby (2022); Whitney Stakes (2023); Pegasus World Cup Invitational Stakes (2025); Ghostzapper Stakes (2025); Oaklawn Handicap (2026); Breeders' Cup wins: Breeders' Cup Classic (2023)
- Last updated on August 9, 2026

White Abarrio (foaled March 18, 2019) is an American retired Thoroughbred racehorse who won multiple Grade I races. Notable wins include the 2022 Florida Derby, 2023 Whitney Stakes, 2023 Breeders' Cup Classic, and the 2025 Pegasus World Cup Invitational Stakes. He also won the 2026 Oaklawn Handicap, which saw him defeat 2025 Kentucky Derby and American Horse of the Year winner Sovereignty.

== Background ==
White Abarrio is a gray stallion bred by Spendthrift Farm. He is by the Tapit son Race Day, out of the Into Mischief mare Catching Diamonds. White Abarrio was the only one of Catching Diamonds' five foals to race. Her most recent offspring are a yearling Lord Nelson colt and a Yaupon 2023 filly.

White Abarrio was sold as a yearling at the 2020 OBS Winter Mixed Sale for $7,500 to Jose Ordonez from Summerfield's consignment. The following year, he was a $40,000 purchase by Carlos Perez from the 2021 Ocala Breeders' Sales March Sale of Two-Year-Olds in Training, where he was consigned by Nice and Easy Thoroughbreds.

== Racing career ==
=== 2021: Two-year-old season ===
White Abarrio won by 6 3/4 lengths in his first start on September 24, 2021, at Gulfstream Park for Perez. Following the win, the horse was sold privately to Clint and Mark Cornett's C2 Racing Stable, with the original owners retaining a share through La Milagrosa Stable, and the horse was transferred to trainer Saffie Joseph, Jr.

White Abarrio had two more starts, winning against a short allowance field at Gulfstream on October 29 before finishing third in the Kentucky Jockey Club Stakes at Churchill Downs.

=== 2022: Three-year-old season ===
White Abarrio started his three-year-old campaign with victories in the Holy Bull Stakes and Florida Derby for three-year-olds at Gulfstream, the latter giving trainer Saffie Joseph, Jr. his second victory in a Grade I stakes race.

The horse then went to the Kentucky Derby where he finished 16th, beaten by 20 lengths.

White Abarrio made four more stakes starts in the year, with placings in the Grade II Ohio Derby and the Grade I Cigar Mile Handicap.

=== 2023: Four-year-old season ===
After finishing eighth of twelve runners in the Pegasus World Cup, White Abarrio won an allowance race at Gulfstream at seven furlongs, the shortest distance he had raced since breaking his maiden.

Two months after the allowance victory, White Abarrio was transferred to trainer Richard Dutrow, Jr. following the temporary suspension by Churchill Downs of trainer Saffie Joseph, Jr. after the sudden deaths of two of his horses. C2 Racing Stable said at the time that they had the utmost confidence in Joseph and his team but made the change to Dutrow based on the ability to manage White Abarrio and the "lack of answers by jurisdictions and operators" with regard to Joseph's status. The owners then sent him to Belmont Park to contest the Grade I Metropolitan Handicap, where he finished third to eventual Horse of the Year Cody's Wish.

White Abarrio then went to Saratoga Race Course to run in the Whitney Stakes, where Cody's Wish was among five others in the starting gate. Sent off as the fourth betting choice, White Abarrio entered the first turn wide but settled in to stay within a length of pace setter Giant Game. White Abarrio entered the stretch and pulled away from the rest of the field under urging by jockey Irad Ortiz Jr. to win by 6 1/4 lengths, while Cody's Wish was third. The Whitney was Dutrow's first Grade I victory since returning from a 10-year suspension imposed by the New York State Gaming Commission.

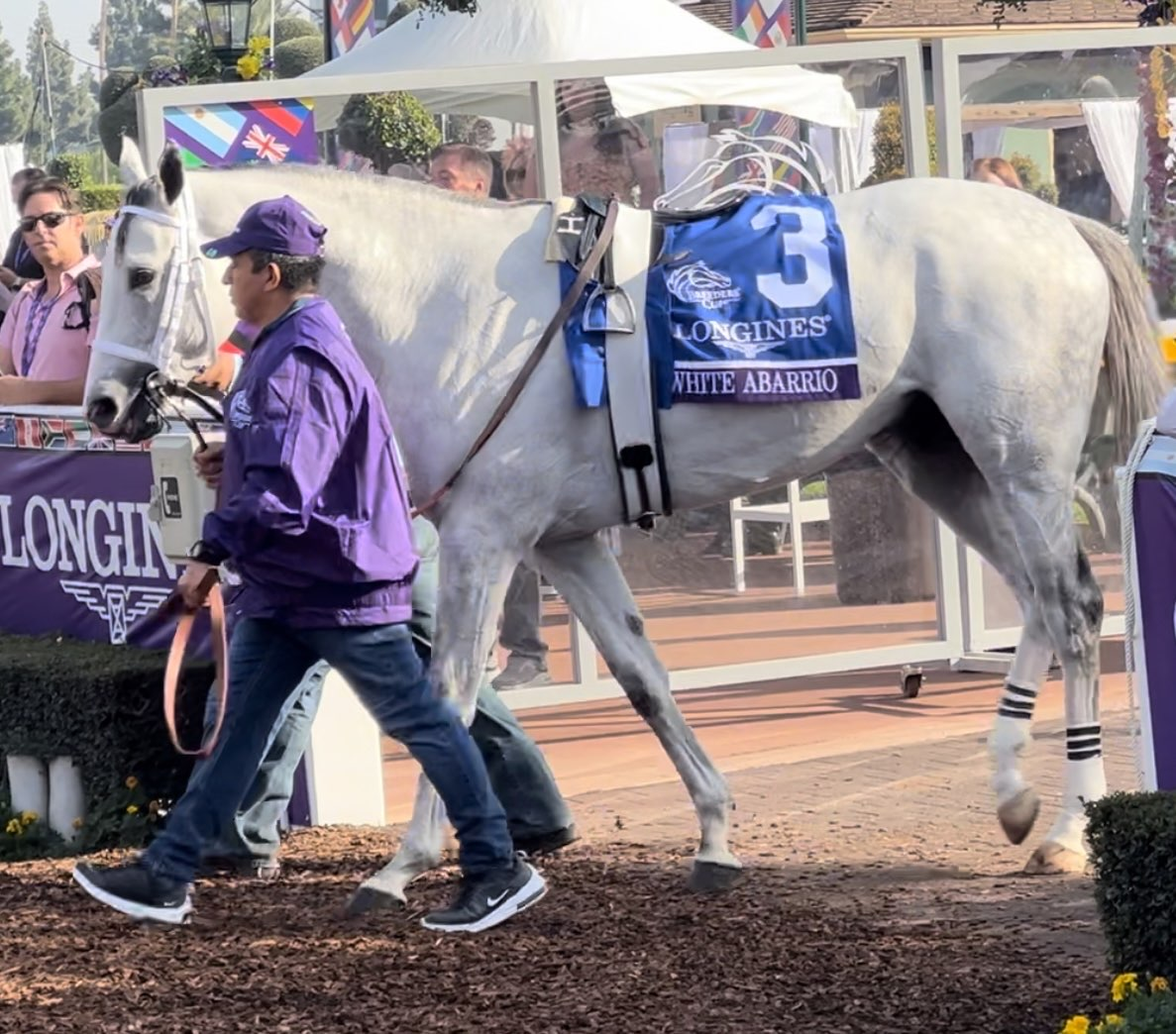
White Abarrio being led into the paddock before the 2023 Breeders Cup Classic.

At the end of the year, White Abarrio contested the Breeders' Cup Classic at Santa Anita Park. Starting as the favorite, he chased the pace and passed leader Arabian Knight in the stretch, winning by one length over the Japanese-bred and -owned Derma Sotogake. White Abarrio finished second to Cody's Wish in Eclipse Award voting for American Horse of the Year and American Champion Older Dirt Male Horse.

=== 2024: Five-year-old season ===
After White Abarrio finished poorly in the Saudi Cup in Saudi Arabia and the Metropolitan Handicap at Belmont, C2 Racing Stable announced that he would be transferred back to Saffie Joseph, Jr. and be pointed to the John A. Nerud Stakes. The horse did not run in the Nerud, with Joseph telling Daily Racing Form that they wanted to give him "a little more time."

White Abarrio came back at the end of the year in a pair of 7-furlong sprints at Gulfstream, winning an allowance and finishing second in the Mr. Prospector Stakes.

=== 2025: Six-year-old season ===
At the start of 2025, White Abarrio was entered into his second Pegasus World Cup and was made the second choice behind Locked. Settling into fifth place early in the race, he charged on race leader Saudi Crown on the far turn and opened up in the stretch to win by 6 1/4 lengths. Two months later, he won the Ghostzapper Stakes at Gulfstream. Later in the year he finished fourth in the Metropolitan Handicap, the Whitney Stakes and the Jockey Club Gold Cup, all at Saratoga.

White Abarrio was entered into the 2025 Breeders' Cup Dirt Mile at Del Mar and made the fifth choice on the morning line in the ten horse field. Immediately before the race, White Abarrio was scratched by the stewards. According to reports, regulatory veterinarians expressed concern about possible lameness in the horse's left front leg. The following day, C2 Racing Stable stated that White Abarrio was doing well, with no soundness issues. The owners of White Abarrio sued the California Horse Racing Board, Del Mar and the Breeders' Cup in April 2026, alleging that the horse's late scratch from the race violated California regulations and protocols.

=== 2026: Seven-year-old season ===
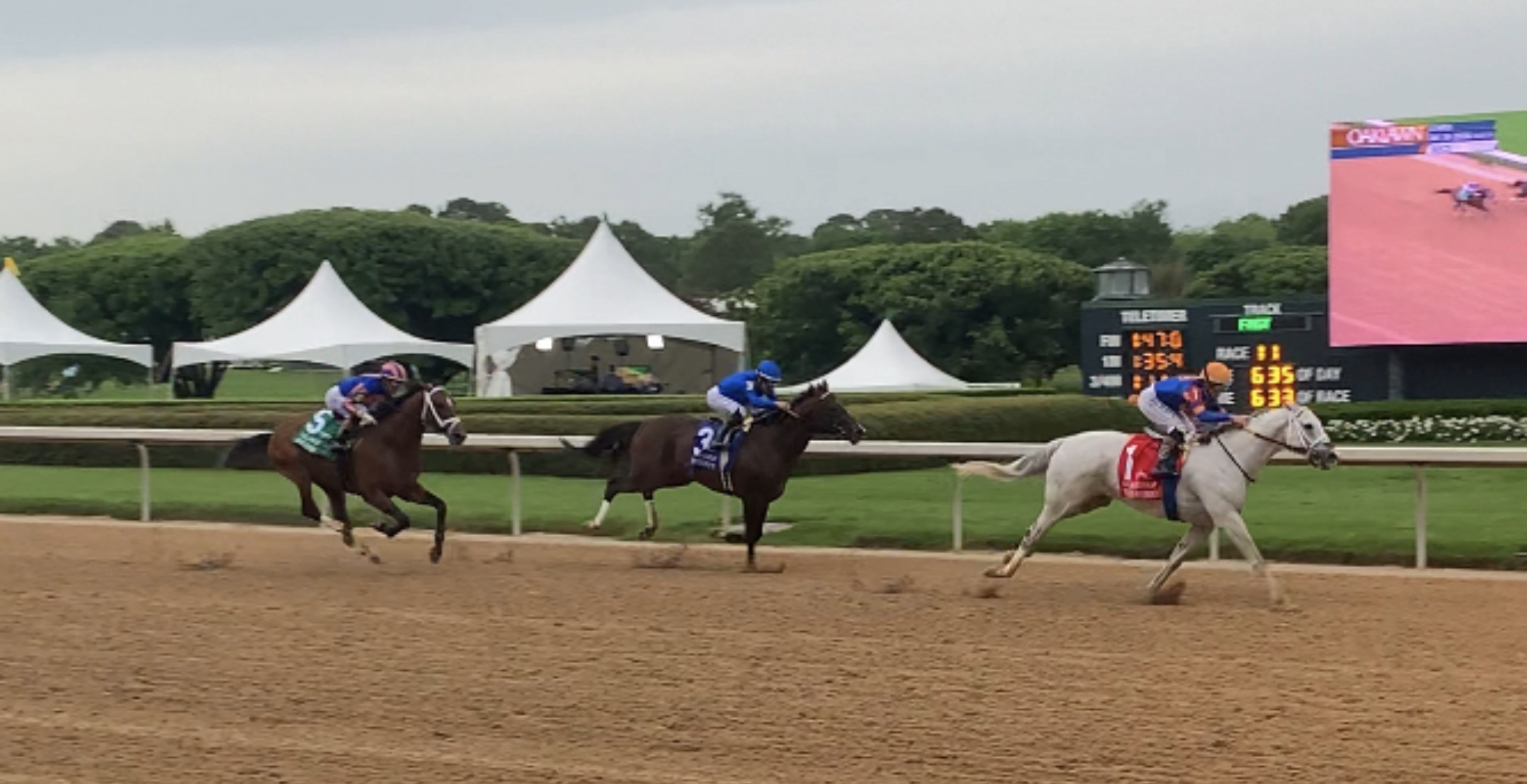
White Abarrio winning the 2026 Oaklawn Handicap.

White Abarrio began his seven-year-old season by attempting to defend his Pegasus World Cup win from the previous year, finishing second behind Skippylongstocking.

On April 19, he was entered to compete in the Oaklawn Handicap against two of the country's top three-year-olds of 2025: Horse of the Year Sovereignty and Preakness winner Journalism. Sent off as the third choice in the six-horse field, White Abarrio advanced along the rail with Sovereignty and Journalism, retreating behind the two as the field went around the first turn. Sitting fourth on the backstretch, jockey Irad Ortiz Jr. took White Abarrio outside of Sovereignty and Journalism on the far turn, eventually taking the lead at the eighth pole and drawing away to win by two lengths. His time in the race of 1:47.49 was the fastest since 1995.

On June 27, he competed in the Stephen Foster Stakes at Churchill Downs, where he finished fourth out of five horses.

In what would end up being his final career start, he finished last of seven horses in the Whitney Stakes at Saratoga. White Abarrio was ridden in his last start by jockey Micah Husbands, as jockey Irad Ortiz Jr. suffered an ankle injury earlier on the Saratoga card.

The day after the Whitney, trainer Saffie Joseph Jr. told Daily Racing Form that White Abarrio was coughing many times after the race, with an endoscopic examination revealing a little mucus in the horse's trachea. He added that the owners would soon get together to determine the horse's future.

The following day, the connections announced that White Abarrio would be retired from racing. Joseph said that he felt White Abarrio's best win of his career was in the 2026 Oaklawn Handicap over Sovereignty. "I feel like defeating a great horse like Sovereignty at Oaklawn was the cherry on top for him," Joseph said, adding that White Abarrio's stud deal came together following that victory. "Once Gainesway came aboard, it was so satisfying to know he was going to a great place to be alongside his grandfather," referring to Tapit.

== Statistics ==
Date	Distance	Race	Grade / Group	Track	Odds	Field	Finish	Winning time	Winning (Losing) margin	Jockey	Ref
2021 – Two-year-old season
Sep 24, 2021	6 1/2 furlongs	Maiden Special Weight		Gulfstream Park	12.30	11	1	1:17.19	6 3/4 lengths	Angel Arroyo	
Oct 29, 2021	1 mile	Allowance		Gulfstream Park	0.30*	5	1	1:36.74	4 lengths	Edgard Zayas	
Nov 27, 2021	1 1/16 miles	Kentucky Jockey Club Stakes	II	Churchill Downs	6.70	11	3	1:43.94	(6 lengths)	Edgard Zayas	
2022 – Three-year-old season
Feb 5, 2022	1 1/16 miles	Holy Bull Stakes	III	Gulfstream Park	6.00	9	1	1:42.80	4 1/2 lengths	Tyler Gaffalione	
Apr 2, 2022	1 1/8 miles	Florida Derby	I	Gulfstream Park	2.90	11	1	1:50.64	1 1/4 lengths	Tyler Gaffalione	
May 7, 2022	1 1/4 miles	Kentucky Derby	I	Churchill Downs	15.40	20	16	2:02.61	(20 lengths)	Tyler Gaffalione	
Jun 25, 2022	1 1/8 miles	Ohio Derby	III	Thistledown	1.50*	7	2	1:10.46	(1 length )	Tyler Gaffalione	
Jul 23, 2022	1 1/8 miles	Haskell Stakes	I	Monmouth Park	7.00	8	7	1:46.24	(34 1/4 lengths)	Joel Rosario	
Sep 24, 2022	1 1/8 miles	Pennsylvania Derby	I	Parx Racing	29.70	11	5	1:48.67	(8 lengths)	Luis Saez	
Dec 3, 2022	1 mile	Cigar Mile Handicap	I	Aqueduct	3.65	6	3	1:35.53	(1/2 length)	Irad Ortiz Jr.	
2023 – Four-year-old season
Jan 29, 2023	1 1/8 miles	Pegasus World Cup	I	Gulfstream Park	6.30	12	8	1:49.44	(13 1/2 lengths)	Tyler Gaffalione	
Mar 4, 2023	7 furlongs	Allowance		Gulfstream Park	1.20*	10	1	1:22.05	4 1/2 lengths	Tyler Gaffalione	
Jun 10, 2023	1 mile	Metropolitan Handicap	I	Belmont Park	20.20	9	3	1:34.36	(3 1/4 lengths)	Tyler Gaffalione	
Aug 5, 2023	1 1/8 miles	Whitney Stakes	I	Saratoga	10.20	6	1	1:48.45	6 1/4 lengths	Irad Ortiz Jr.	
Nov 4, 2023	1 1/4 miles	Breeders' Cup Classic	I	Santa Anita	2.60*	12	1	2:02.87	1 length	Irad Ortiz Jr.	
2024 – Five-year-old season
Feb 24, 2024	1800 metres	Saudi Cup	I	King Abdulaziz	N/A (Note: Wagering is not allowed in Saudi Arabia. In British wagering, White Abarrio started at 11/8 odds and was the favorite)	14	10	1:52.22	(15 lengths)	Irad Ortiz Jr.	
Jun 8, 2024	1 mile	Metropolitan Handicap	I	Saratoga	1.70	6	5	1:35.12	(10 1/4 lengths)	Irad Ortiz Jr.	
Nov 22, 2024	7 furlongs	Allowance		Gulfstream Park	0.40*	5	1	1:23.52	10 1/4 lengths	Irad Ortiz Jr.	
Dec 28, 2024	7 furlongs	Mr. Prospector Stakes	III	Gulfstream Park	0.40*	10	2	1:22.47	1 1/4 lengths	Irad Ortiz Jr.	
2025 – Six-year-old season
Jan 25, 2025	1 1/8 miles	Pegasus World Cup	I	Gulfstream Park	2.80	11	1	1:48.05	6 1/4lengths	Irad Ortiz Jr.	
Mar 29, 2025	1 1/16 miles	Ghostzapper Stakes	III	Gulfstream Park	0.05*	6	1	1:41.97	1 1/4lengths	Irad Ortiz Jr.	
Jun 7, 2025	1 mile	Metropolitan Handicap	I	Saratoga	2.60	5	4	1:35.89	(5 1/4 lengths)	Irad Ortiz Jr.	
Aug 2, 2025	1 1/8 miles	Whitney Stakes	I	Saratoga	4.50	9	4	1:48.92	(4 lengths)	Irad Ortiz Jr.	
Aug 31, 2025	1 1/4 miles	Jockey Club Gold Cup	I	Saratoga	11.50	8	4	2:02.16	(3 1/2 lengths)	Edgard Zayas	
2026 – Seven-year-old season
Jan 24, 2026	1 1/8 miles	Pegasus World Cup	I	Gulfstream Park	3.40	12	2	1:48.67	(1 3/4 lengths)	Irad Ortiz Jr.	
Apr 18, 2026	1 1/8 miles	Oaklawn Handicap	II	Oaklawn Park	3.60	6	1	1:47.49	2 lengths	Irad Ortiz Jr.	
Jun 27, 2026	1 1/8 miles	Stephen Foster Handicap	I	Churchill Downs	5.08	5	4	1:48.03	(9 3/4 lengths)	Irad Ortiz Jr.	
Aug 8, 2026	1 1/8 miles	Whitney Stakes	I	Saratoga	11.48	7	7	1:47.91	(17 1/2 lengths)	Micah Husbands	

Notes:
An (*) asterisk after the odds means White Abarrio was the post-time favorite.

== Stud career ==
In June 2026 it was announced that White Abarrio would stand at Gainesway Farm in 2027 with a fee of 17,500 for his first season.

== Pedigree ==
Pedigree of White Abarrio, gray or roan colt, March 18, 2019
Sire Race Day (2011)	Tapit (2001)	Pulpit (1994)	A.P. Indy (1989)
Sire Race Day (2011)	Tapit (2001)	Pulpit (1994)	Preach (1989)
Sire Race Day (2011)	Tapit (2001)	Tap Your Heels (1996)	Unbridled (1987)
Sire Race Day (2011)	Tapit (2001)	Tap Your Heels (1996)	Ruby Slippers (1982)
Sire Race Day (2011)	Rebalite (2004)	More Than Ready (1997)	Southern Halo (1983)
Sire Race Day (2011)	Rebalite (2004)	More Than Ready (1997)	Woodman's Girl (1990)
Sire Race Day (2011)	Rebalite (2004)	Printing Press (1981)	In Reality (1964)
Sire Race Day (2011)	Rebalite (2004)	Printing Press (1981)	Wealth Of Nations (1975)
Dam Catching Diamonds (2015)	Into Mischief (2005)	Harlan's Holiday (1999)	Harlan (1989)
Dam Catching Diamonds (2015)	Into Mischief (2005)	Harlan's Holiday (1999)	Christmas in Aiken (1992)
Dam Catching Diamonds (2015)	Into Mischief (2005)	Leslie's Lady (1996)	Tricky Creek (1986)
Dam Catching Diamonds (2015)	Into Mischief (2005)	Leslie's Lady (1996)	Crystal Lady (CAN) (1990)
Dam Catching Diamonds (2015)	Grand Breeze (2005)	Grand Slam (1995)	Gone West (1984)
Dam Catching Diamonds (2015)	Grand Breeze (2005)	Grand Slam (1995)	Bright Candles (1987)
Dam Catching Diamonds (2015)	Grand Breeze (2005)	Breeze Lass (1990)	It's Freezing (1972)
Dam Catching Diamonds (2015)	Grand Breeze (2005)	Breeze Lass (1990)	Faneuil Lass (1979) (Family: 9-e)
