= Smart Strike =

Canadian-bred Thoroughbred racehorse

- Sire: Mr. Prospector
- Grandsire: Raise a Native
- Dam: Classy 'n Smart
- Damsire: Smarten
- Sex: Stallion
- Foaled: May 21, 1992
- Died: March 25, 2015 (aged 22)
- Country: Canada
- Colour: Bay
- Breeder: Sam-Son Farm
- Owner: Sam-Son Farm
- Trainer: Mark Frostad
- Record: 8: 6-1-0
- Earnings: US$337,376

Major wins
- Salvator Mile Handicap (1996); Philip H. Iselin Handicap (1996)

Awards
- Leading sire in North America (2007, 2008)

Honours
- Canadian Horse Racing Hall of Fame (2008)

Smart Strike (May 21, 1992, in Ontario – March 25, 2015) was a Canadian Thoroughbred racehorse. The son of the Champion sire, Mr. Prospector, and out of the Canadian Horse Racing Hall of Fame mare Classy 'n Smart, Smart Strike is a half-brother to 1991 Canadian Triple Crown champion Dance Smartly.

Owned and bred by Sam-Son Farm, on the racetrack, Smart Strike's most important win came in the Grade I Philip H. Iselin Handicap. However, he was just developing into a top-flight horse when his career was cut short by injury. He suffered a condylar fracture during a workout while preparing for the Breeders' Cup.

At maturity, he reached 16 hands (64 inches, 163 cm) high.

== Stud record ==
Since he was retired to stud duty at Lane's End Farm in Versailles, Kentucky, in 1997, Smart Strike's value as a stallion rose dramatically as a result of the performance of his offspring. Twice honored as the leading Sire in North America, he was the sire of 113 stakes winners, 12 champions, five Breeders' Cup winners, and two Classic victors. He has also found international success, both as a sire and broodmare sire, producing champions in several different countries.

- Fleetstreet Dancer (b. 1998) - won Japan Cup Dirt
- Tenpins (b. 1998) - Philip H. Iselin Handicap
- Soaring Free (b. 1999) - Canadian Horse of the Year (2004), set North American record for 7 furlongs on turf
- Portcullis (b. 1999) - 2002 Champion Grass Horse in Canada
- Added Edge (b. 2000) - Canadian Champion 2-Year-Old Colt (2002)
- Eye of the Sphynx (b. 2001) - Canadian Champion 3-Year-Old Filly, dam of Eye of the Leopard
- English Channel (b. 2002) - American Champion Male Turf Horse (2007), multiple Grade 1 winner including the Breeders' Cup Turf
- Gold Strike (b. 2002) - wins included the Woodbine Oaks. Voted 2005 Canadian Champion 3-Year-Old Filly (2005). Dam of 2022 Kentucky Derby winner Rich Strike
- Fabulous Strike (b. 2003) - earned a "huge" 118 Beyer Speed Figure in his first race of 2007 then won the Aristides Breeders' Cup Stakes
- Strike a Deal (b. 2004) - won the Laurel Futurity (2006), Straight Deal Stakes (2007)
- Curlin (b. 2004) - 2007 / 2008 American Horse of the Year, wins include Preakness Stakes, Breeders' Cup Classic, Dubai World Cup.
- Furthest Land (b. 2005) - winner of the 2009 Breeders' Cup Dirt Mile and Kentucky Cup Classic
- Square Eddie (b. 2006) - won 2008 Breeders' Futurity Stakes, 2nd Breeders' Cup Juvenile
- Papa Clem (b. 2006) - won 2009 Arkansas Derby
- Lookin at Lucky (b. 2007) - at two, won three Grade 1 races. 2010 Champion Preakness Stakes Winner. Winner of over 2 million dollars at the age of 3. Voted 2009 American Champion Two-Year-Old Colt
- My Miss Aurelia (b. 2009) - undefeated as winner of the 2011 Breeders' Cup Juvenile Fillies
- Battle of Midway (b. 2014) - won the Breeders' Cup Dirt Mile, Affirmed Stakes, and Shared Belief Stakes. 3rd in 2017 Kentucky Derby

Damsire:

- Mine That Bird (b. 2006) - won 2009 Kentucky Derby
- Shared Account (b. 2006) - won 2010 Breeders' Cup Filly & Mare Turf
- Eye of the Leopard (b. 2006) - won 2009 Queen's Plate and Plate Trial Stakes
- First Dude (b. 2007) - won 2011 Hollywood Gold Cup, second in 2010 Preakness Stakes, Pennsylvania Derby, 3rd in 2010 Belmont Stakes
- Inglorious (b. 2008) - won 2011 Queen's Plate, Woodbine Oaks, La Lorgnette Stakes
- Dullahan (b. 2009) - won 2012 Pacific Classic Stakes, Blue Grass Stakes, 2011 Breeders' Futurity Stakes, half-brother to Mine That Bird
- Rich Strike (b. 2019) - won 2022 Kentucky Derby
- Stars on Earth (b. 2019) - won 2022 Oka Sho, Yushun Himba
- Seize the Grey (b. 2021) - won 2024 Preakness Stakes

== Death and honors ==
For his contribution to Thoroughbred racing, Smart Strike was inducted in the Canadian Horse Racing Hall of Fame in 2008.

While remarkably healthy and fertile until early 2015, Smart Strike was humanely euthanized on March 25, 2015, as a result of complications due to laminitis.

== Pedigree ==
Pedigree of Smart Strike (CAN), bay horse, May 21, 1992
Sire Mr. Prospector (USA) 1970	Raise a Native (CAN); 1961	Native Dancer	Polynesian
Sire Mr. Prospector (USA) 1970	Raise a Native (CAN); 1961	Native Dancer	Geisha
Sire Mr. Prospector (USA) 1970	Raise a Native (CAN); 1961	Raise You	Case Ace
Sire Mr. Prospector (USA) 1970	Raise a Native (CAN); 1961	Raise You	Lady Glory
Sire Mr. Prospector (USA) 1970	Gold Digger; 1962	Nashua	Nasrullah
Sire Mr. Prospector (USA) 1970	Gold Digger; 1962	Nashua	Segula
Sire Mr. Prospector (USA) 1970	Gold Digger; 1962	Sequence	Count Fleet
Sire Mr. Prospector (USA) 1970	Gold Digger; 1962	Sequence	Miss Dogwood
Dam Classy 'n Smart (CAN) 1981	Smarten	Cyane	Turn-To
Dam Classy 'n Smart (CAN) 1981	Smarten	Cyane	Your Game
Dam Classy 'n Smart (CAN) 1981	Smarten	Smartaire	Quibu
Dam Classy 'n Smart (CAN) 1981	Smarten	Smartaire	Art Teacher
Dam Classy 'n Smart (CAN) 1981	No Class	Nodouble	Noholme
Dam Classy 'n Smart (CAN) 1981	No Class	Nodouble	Alba-Jay
Dam Classy 'n Smart (CAN) 1981	No Class	Classy Quillo	Outing Class
Dam Classy 'n Smart (CAN) 1981	No Class	Classy Quillo	Quillopoly (family 23-b)
