= No Class (horse) =

Canadian-bred Thoroughbred racehorse

- Sire: Nodouble
- Grandsire: Noholme
- Dam: Classy Quillo
- Damsire: Outing Class
- Sex: Mare
- Foaled: 1974
- Country: Canada
- Colour: Bay
- Breeder: Jack Hood Farms
- Owner: Sam-Son Farms
- Trainer: Glenn Magnusson
- Record: 29: 3-5-9
- Earnings: Can$37,543

Awards
- Sovereign Award for Outstanding Broodmare (1985); Canadian Horse Racing Hall of Fame (1997)

No Class (March 30, 1974 – 1993) was a Canadian Hall of Fame Thoroughbred racehorse.

== Background ==
Bred by Jack Hood of Stratford, Ontario, No Class was out of Classy Quillo, whose damsire was Princequillo. Her sire, Nodouble, was an outstanding runner who was voted American Co-Champion Older Male Horse honours in 1969 and 1970 and was the leading sire in North America in 1981. No Class was purchased by Sam-Son Farms for $25,000 at the 1975 Canadian Thoroughbred Horse Society yearling sale.

== Breeding record ==
While No Class had limited success on the track, her 1997 induction in the Canadian Horse Racing Hall of Fame was in recognition of her contribution to racing as a broodmare. A winner of the 1985 Sovereign Award for Outstanding Broodmare, she was the dam of eight foals of which seven raced. All seven were race winners, four were Canadian Champions of which two were Hall of Fame inductees.

No Class's eight foals were:

- Classic Cannonade (b. 1980) - sire Cannonade : stakes winner
- Classy 'n Smart (b. 1981) - sire Smarten : Canadian Horse Racing Hall of Fame; dam of Smart Strike and of Canadian and United States Hall of Fame super filly, Dance Smartly
- Grey Classic (b. 1983) - sire Grey Dawn : won Cup and Saucer Stakes, Coronation Futurity Stakes; Canadian Champion 2-Year-Old Male Horse
- Regal Classic (b. 1985) - sire Vice Regent : Canadian Champion 2-Year-Old Male Horse; career earnings of $1,456,584
- Sky Classic (b. 1987) - sire Nijinsky : Three-time Canadian Sovereign Award winner and American Champion Male Turf Horse, Canadian Horse Racing Hall of Fame, career earnings of $3,320,398
- Classic Slew (b. 1988) an unraced daughter by U.S. Triple Crown winner, Seattle Slew
- Classic Reign (b. 1989) - sire Vice Regent : multiple stakes winner, including stakes record time in the Canadian Maturity Stakes
- Always A Classic (b. 1993) - sire Deputy Minister : won U.S. G1 Turf Classic Stakes

No Class died at age nineteen in 1993.
