= Wildcat Heir Stakes =

(Florida Sires) Wildcat Heir Stakes
- Class: Restricted (Black type)
- Location: Gulfstream Park; Hallandale Beach, Florida
- Inaugurated: 2018
- Race type: Thoroughbred - Flat racing
- Website: www.gulfstreampark.com

Race information
- Distance: 1 mile (8 furlongs)
- Surface: Dirt
- Track: left-handed
- Qualification: Three-year-olds & up
- Purse: $150,000

The FTBOA Wildcat Heir Stakes is a Thoroughbred horse race open to horses of either sex age three and older who are a registered Florida-bred sired by an FSS eligible stallion. It is contested at a distance of six furlongs.

The first running took place on September 29, 2018 at Gulfstream Park in Hallandale Beach, Florida as part of the Florida Thoroughbred Breeders' & Owners' Association (FTBOA) Florida Sire series.

The race is named for Wildcat Heir, a Florida-bred multiple stakes winner who was a four-time leading sire in Florida.

Owner Harold Queen and trainer David Fawkes won the first and the third of the three editions of the Wildcat Heir Stakes run since inception. They had previously enjoyed national and international recognition with their outstanding colt Big Drama who won the 2010 Breeders' Cup Sprint and was voted the Eclipse Award as that year's American Champion Sprint Horse. https://www.ntra.com/eclipse-awards/history/

== Records ==
Speed record:

- 1:35.34 @ 1 mile: Noble Drama (2020)

Most wins:

- Noble Drama (2018, 2020)

Most wins by a jockey:

- No jockey has won this race more than once

Most wins by a trainer:

- 2 - David Fawkes

Most wins by an owner:

- 2 - Harold L. Queen

== Winners ==
Year	Winner	Age	Jockey	Trainer	Owner	Dist. (Miles)	Time	Win $	Gr.
2020	Noble Drama	5	Emisael Jaramillo	David Fawkes	Harold L. Queen	1 m	1:35.34	$90,000	B/T
2019	Extraordinary Jerry	4	Edgard J. Zayas	Todd Pletcher	Nice Guys Stable (Steven Spielman)	1 m	1:35.75	$90,000	B/T
2018	Noble Drama	3	Nik Juarez	David Fawkes	Harold L. Queen	1 m	1:37.71	$90,000	B/T
