= 2022 Kentucky Derby =

Horse race

148th Kentucky Derby
- Kentucky Derby
- Grade I stakes race
- "The Run for the Roses"
- Location: Churchill Downs; Louisville, Kentucky, United States
- Date: May 7, 2022
- Distance: 1 1/4 mi (10 furlongs; 2,012 m)
- Winning horse: Rich Strike
- Winning time: 2:02.61
- Final odds: 80–1
- Jockey: Sonny Leon
- Trainer: Eric Reed
- Owner: RED TR-Racing
- Conditions: Fast
- Surface: Dirt
- Attendance: 147,294

û

The 2022 Kentucky Derby (officially, the 148th Running of the Kentucky Derby Presented by Woodford Reserve) took place on Saturday, May 7, 2022, at Churchill Downs in Louisville, Kentucky. It was the 148th running of the Kentucky Derby, a 1 1/4 miles (2.0 km) Grade I stakes race for three-year-old Thoroughbreds. The Derby is held annually at Churchill Downs on the first Saturday in May since its inception in 1875. The 20 horses that ran in the Derby qualified by earning points in the 2022 Road to the Kentucky Derby.

The two favorites for the 2022 Kentucky Derby were Epicenter, the winner of the Louisiana Derby, and Zandon, the winner of the Blue Grass Stakes. Both horses finished behind winner Rich Strike, who had only entered the race after a late scratch. Entering the race at odds of 80–1, Rich Strike's victory was the second-largest upset in Derby history. It was the first Kentucky Derby victory for his trainer Eric Reed, as well as the first graded stakes win in any race for his jockey Sonny Leon.

== Qualification ==
Participation in the Kentucky Derby is restricted to three-year-old Thoroughbreds. As such, all participants in the 2022 race were foaled in 2019, and most originated from the 2019 North American crop of 20,433 foals. This was the smallest North American foal crop since 1966, in which 20,228 Thoroughbreds were foaled. Participation in the Kentucky Derby is also open to European and Japanese Thoroughbreds, but foreign participation is rare. The field is limited to the top 20 horses on the 2022 Road to the Kentucky Derby leaderboard; these points are distributed to the top-four finishers in designated races. The Road to the Kentucky Derby system was introduced in 2013; previously, qualification was tied to a horse's earnings in previous graded stakes races, which were affected by variables such as the presence of casinos at a particular race track.

In 2022, the main Road to the Kentucky Derby consisted of 36 races in North America plus one in Dubai, taking place between September 18, 2021, and April 16, 2022. It featured the addition of one race — the newly created Gun Runner Stakes, which took place at Fair Grounds Race Course on December 26.

No horse trained by Bob Baffert was eligible for points in any qualification race. If a Baffert-trained horse were to finish in the top four of a qualifying race, zero points would be awarded. This rule was put into place as part of a larger series of sanctions against Baffert, whose 2021 Kentucky Derby runner Medina Spirit finished first but was subsequently disqualified after testing positive for betamethasone. In response, owners of several Baffert-trained Derby contenders transferred them to trainers Tim Yakteen and Rodolphe Brisset. Two of these horses, Taiba and Messier, eventually started in the Derby after earning points following the transfer.

The eight major prep races for Derby qualification are, in chronological order, the UAE Derby, Louisiana Derby, Florida Derby, Arkansas Derby, Jeff Ruby Steaks, Wood Memorial Stakes, Blue Grass Stakes, and Santa Anita Derby. All of these races provide 100 points to their first-place finisher. The major preps began on March 26, when Epicenter won the Louisiana Derby and Crown Pride, a Japanese horse who entered with 16–1 odds, won the UAE Derby. The next three major races were held on April 2, with White Abarrio, Cyberknife, and Tiz the Bomb winning the Florida Derby, Arkansas Derby, and Jeff Ruby Steaks, respectively. On April 9, the final day of major preps, Mo Donegal won the Wood Memorial, Zandon the Blue Grass, and Taiba the Santa Anita Derby. While a Derby invitation is extended to the winner of the European and the Japan Road to the Derby, none of the top finishers from either circuit were nominated for the Triple Crown, and the offers were not accepted. The one Japanese horse who participated in the Derby, Crown Pride, did so by qualifying on the main Road.

== Field ==
The field for the 2022 Kentucky Derby was considered to be one of the most competitive in recent memory, with no clear favorite in the weeks leading up to the race. The morning line front runners were Zandon and Epicenter, with 3–1 and 7–2 odds respectively. Zandon, the Blue Grass Stakes winner, had a 2–1–1 record (two wins, a second and a third-place finish) in four career starts and finished second in the Road to the Kentucky Derby with 114 points. Epicenter, meanwhile, was 4–1–0 in six lifetime starts with wins in the Risen Star Stakes and Louisiana Derby. He led the Road to the Derby with 164 points. Prior to the race, Epicenter drew post 3, an historically difficult starting post due to its close proximity to the rail. The last Kentucky Derby winner to break from the third post was Real Quiet in 1998. Zandon, breaking from the 10th post of 20, was also figured to run into traffic from his competitors as he had a late-running style.

Also considered strong contenders for the Derby were Messier, Taiba, and White Abarrio. Messier, originally trained by Baffert, was transferred to Yakteen in order to qualify for the Triple Crown. He was 14th in qualification with 40 points and entered the race with a 3–3–0 record in six starts, including a second-place finish in the Santa Anita Derby. Taiba, the winner of the Santa Anita Derby, had also been transferred from Baffert to Yakteen and was undefeated in two starts. His 100 points were eighth among Kentucky Derby qualifiers. White Abarrio was trained by Saffie Joseph Jr., while his 112 points were third among all Derby contenders. White Abarrio had a 4–0–1 record in five lifetime starts, including a first-place finish in the Florida Derby. Messier drew the sixth post before the race, with Taiba drawing twelfth and White Abarrio fifteenth.

If any of the 20 Derby entries is withdrawn from the race before betting begins, the next-highest ranked horse on the leaderboard draws into their place. On the day before the race, Ethereal Road, who was set to race from the 20th post, was scratched from the Derby. Rich Strike drew into the Derby as a result of the scratch. He had a record of 1–0–3 in seven lifetime starts and earned his qualifying points by finishing in third place at the Jeff Ruby Steaks. His only win came in a maiden claiming race on September 17, 2021.

== Race description ==
The Kentucky Derby takes place annually at Churchill Downs in Louisville, Kentucky, on the first Saturday in May, where it began in 1875. Participating horses run a distance of 1 1/4 miles (2.0 km), or 10 furlongs. The Derby is a Grade I event with a purse of $3,000,000 in 2022. Predicted rain and thunderstorms in Louisville, Kentucky suggested that the Derby could be raced in muddy or sloppy conditions. Only three horses in the Derby had previously raced on an "off" track, and such precipitation had the chance to alter the race dynamics. However, the rain held off. By the time horses reached the post, the weather at Churchill Downs was 62 °F (17 °C) with cloudy skies and 10 mph (16 km/h) winds. The track condition was listed as fast.

The listed attendance for the 2022 Kentucky Derby was 147,294. This was an increase over the previous year, when ticket sales were restricted due to the effects of the COVID-19 pandemic, but below the expected crowd of 170,000. Coverage of the Derby was broadcast on USA Network from noon to 2:30 p.m. (ET) and then moved to NBC until 7:30 p.m. (ET). The race was also broadcast online through Peacock, NBCSports.com, and the NBC Sports app.

Summer is Tomorrow took an early lead out of the gates, setting a Derby record by running the first quarter-mile in 21.78 seconds. Crown Pride kept apace with Summer is Tomorrow through the first half-mile, run in 45.36 seconds, with Messier following close behind. Messier took the lead at the 3/4-mile mark but was soon overtaken by Epicenter at the head of the stretch. Meanwhile, Rich Strike, who had been well back early, was still in fifteenth place after the first mile and in heavy traffic. Rich Strike moved to the rail, weaved around a tiring Messier and closed steadily in the final furlong to win the race with a time of 2:02.61. Epicenter finished in second place, 3/4 of a length behind. Another 3/4 of a length behind him was Zandon, with Simplification finishing a further two lengths back in fourth. Messier finished the race in fifteenth while Summer is Tomorrow finished last among all 20 participants.

Going off at odds of 80–1, Rich Strike recorded the second-highest upset in Derby history behind Donerail, who won the 1913 race with 91–1 odds. He was also the second horse in Derby history to win the race from the 20th post, following Big Brown in 2008. It was the first Kentucky Derby victory for trainer Eric Reed, as well as the first graded stakes win of any kind for jockey Sonny Leon.

== Results ==
Finish	Program Number	Horse	Qualifying Points	Trainer	Jockey	Morning Line Odds	Final Odds	Margin (Lengths)	Winnings
1	21 (Note: Rich Strike drew in from the also eligible list when Ethereal Road was scratched.)	Rich Strike	21	Eric Reed	Sonny Leon	30-1	80.80		$1,860,000
2	3	Epicenter	164	Steve Asmussen	Joel Rosario	7-2	4.10	3/4	$600,000
3	10	Zandon	114	Chad C. Brown	Flavien Prat	3-1	6.10	1 1/2	$300,000
4	13	Simplification	74	Antonio Sano	José Ortiz	20-1	35.30	3 1/2	$150,000
5	1	Mo Donegal	112	Todd A. Pletcher	Irad Ortiz Jr.	10-1	10.10	3 3/4	$90,000
6	14	Barber Road	58	John Ortiz	Reylu Gutierrez	30-1	60.40	4 3/4	
7	18	Tawny Port	60	Brad H. Cox	Ricardo Santana Jr.	30-1	80.50	4 3/4	
8	5	Smile Happy	70	Kenneth G. McPeek	Corey Lanerie	20-1	14.10	10	
9	9	Tiz the Bomb	110	Kenneth G. McPeek	Brian Hernandez Jr.	30-1	31.00	12 1/2	
10	19	Zozos	40	Brad H. Cox	Manuel Franco	20-1	48.70	15 3/4	
11	17	Classic Causeway	66	Brian A. Lynch	Julien Leparoux	30-1	78.90	17	
12	12	Taiba	100	Tim Yakteen	Mike E. Smith	12-1	5.80	17 3/4	
13	7	Crown Pride	100	Koichi Shintani	Christophe Lemaire	20-1	17.50	18 1/4	
14	2	Happy Jack	30	Doug F. O'Neill	Rafael Bejarano	30-1	23.20	19	
15	6	Messier	40	Tim Yakteen	John Velazquez	8-1	7.10	19 1/4	
16	15	White Abarrio	112	Saffie Joseph Jr.	Tyler Gaffalione	10-1	15.40	20	
17	8	Charge It	40	Todd A. Pletcher	Luis Saez	20-1	16.00	28	
18	16	Cyberknife	100	Brad H. Cox	Florent Geroux	20-1	14.90	42 3/4	
19	11	Pioneer of Medina	25	Todd A. Pletcher	Joe Bravo	30-1	55.90	57	
20	4	Summer Is Tomorrow	40	Bhupat Seemar	Mickael Barzalona	30-1	36.80	64 1/2	
Scratched	~~20~~	~~Ethereal Road~~	22	D. Wayne Lukas	Luis Contreras	30-1	n/a		
	~~AE~~ (Note: Rattle N Roll was second on the also eligible list. He did not draw into the race as there was only one scratch from the original field of 20.)	~~Rattle N Roll~~	20	Kenneth G. McPeek	James Graham	30-1	n/a		

Track: Fast

Times: 1/4 mile – 21.78; 1/2 mile – 45.36; 3/4 mile – 1:10.34; mile – 1:36.96; final – 2:02.61
Splits for each quarter-mile: (23:58) (24:98) (26:62) (25:65)

Source: Equibase chart

=== Payouts ===
The table below provides the Kentucky Derby payout schedule.

Program number	Horse name	Win	Place	Show
21	Rich Strike	$163.60	$74.20	$29.40
3	Epicenter	—	$7.40	$5.20
10	Zandon	—	—	$5.60

- $2 exacta (21–3): $4,101.20
- $0.50 trifecta (21–3–10): $7,435.35
- $1 superfecta (21–3–10–13): $321,500.10
- $1 Super High Five (21–3–10–13–1): $741,018.90

== Aftermath ==
On May 12, Rich Strike's owner Rick Dawson announced that the horse would not participate in the 2022 Preakness Stakes. Dawson and Reed told reporters that the decision was made to give Rich Strike time to recover from his "tremendous effort" in the Derby. His next start would instead be the 2022 Belmont Stakes, giving the horse five weeks between major races instead of two. It was the first time that a healthy Derby winner did not race in the Preakness since Spend a Buck in 1985. Instead, Early Voting won the Preakness, while Epicenter became the first horse since 2012's Bodemeister to finish second in both races.
