= Sovereign Award for Outstanding Broodmare =

The Sovereign Award for Outstanding Broodmare is a Canadian Thoroughbred horse racing honor created in 1975 by the Jockey Club of Canada. It is part of the Sovereign Awards program and is a lifetime achievement award given annually to a top broodmare in Canada.

Past winners:

- 1975 : Reasonable Wife
- 1976 : Northern Minx
- 1977 : Doris White
- 1978 : Fanfreluche
- 1979 : Fit'z Fancy
- 1980 : Hangin Round
- 1981 : Native Flower
- 1982 : Yonnie Girl
- 1983 : Two Rings
- 1984 : Friendly Ways
- 1985 : No Class
- 1986 : Loudrangle
- 1987 : Arctic Vixen
- 1988 : Polite Lady
- 1989 : Passing Mood
- 1990 : Shy Spirit
- 1991 : Classy 'n Smart
- 1992 : Ballade
- 1993 : Bold Debra
- 1994 : Rainbow Connection
- 1995 : Sea Regent
- 1996 : Amelia Bearhart
- 1997 : Charming Sassafras
- 1998 : Fleet Courage
- 1999 : Sharpening Up
- 2000 : Primarily
- 2001 : Dance Smartly
- 2002 : First Class Gal
- 2003 : Radiant Ring
- 2004 : Annasan
- 2005 : Native Rights
- 2006 : Dream Smartly
- 2007 : Lover's Talk
- 2008 : Kathie's Colleen
- 2009 : Pico Teneriffe
- 2010 : Destroy
- 2011 : Noble Strike
- 2012 : Misty Mission
- 2013 : Captivating
- 2014 : Eye of the Sphynx
- 2015 : Rare Opportunity
- 2016 : Galloping Ami
- 2017 : Victorious Ami
- 2018 : In Return
- 2019 : Loving Vindication
- 2020 : Danceforthecause
- 2021 : Avie’s Empire
- 2022 : Count to Three
- 2023 : Mendocino Beano
- 2024 : Platinum Steel
- 2025 : Dixie Chicken
