= Classy 'N Smart Stakes =

- Class: Restricted Stakes
- Location: Woodbine Racetrack; Toronto, Ontario, Canada
- Inaugurated: 1997
- Race type: Thoroughbred - Flat racing
- Website: web.archive.org/web/20100316214346/http://www.woodbineentertainment.com:80/qct/default.asp

Race information
- Distance: 1 1/16 miles (8.5 furlongs)
- Surface: Polytrack synthetic dirt
- Track: left-handed
- Qualification: Three-year-olds and up
- Weight: Assigned
- Purse: $94,913 (2016)

The Classy 'N Smart Stakes is a Thoroughbred horse race run annually in mid October at Woodbine Racetrack in Toronto, Ontario, Canada. An Ontario Sire Stakes, it is a restricted race for fillies and mares, age three and older. It is contested over a distance of one and one-sixteenth miles (8.5 furlongs) on Polytrack synthetic dirt and currently carries a purse of $94,913.

Inaugurated in 1997, the race was named to honor Sam-Son Farm's Champion filly and Canadian Horse Racing Hall of Fame inductee, Classy 'n Smart.

== Records ==
Speed record: (Through 1998, Woodbine times were recorded in fifths of a second. Since 1999 they are in hundredths of a second)

- 1:42.53 – Strut the Course (2014)

Most wins:

- 3 – Brass in Pocket (2002, 2003, 2004)

Most wins by an owner:

- 3 – Frank Di Giulio, Jr. (2002, 2003, 2004)

Most wins by a jockey:

- 3 – Todd Kabel (2001, 2002, 2004)

Most wins by a trainer:

- 4 – Robert P. Tiller (2002, 2003, 2004, 2016)

== Winners ==
Year	Winner	Age	Jockey	Trainer	Owner	Time
2016	Sweater Weather	5	Jermaine V. Bridgmohan	Robert P. Tiller	Frank D. Di Giulio, Jr.	1:45.11
2015	Flipcup	4	Alan Garcia	William I. Mott	Team Penney/Wachtel Stable/Brous Stable	1:44.38
2014	Strut the Course	4	Eurico Rosa da Silva	Barb Minshall	John Unger	1:42.53
2013	Moonlit Beauty	7	David Moran	John LeBlanc, Jr.	William Gierkink	1:45.13
2012	Moonlit Beauty	6	Eurico Rosa Da Silva	John LeBlanc, Jr.	William Gierkink	1:43.54
2011	Bear It's Time	3	Emma-Jayne Wilson	Reade Baker	Bear Stables	1:44.28
2010	Impossible Time	5	Jono Jones	Roger Attfield	Charles E. Fipke	1:43.78
2009	You Will Love Me	5	Chantal Sutherland	Robert Barnett	William Jones	1:45.52
2008	Bold Corky	4	Tyler Pizarro	Willie Armata	Rainbow St/All Day Racing St	1:44.57
2007	Financingavailable	6	James McAleney	Lorne Richards	K. K. Sangara	1:45.78
2006	Financingavailable	5	James McAleney	Lorne Richards	K. K. Sangara	1:44.57
2005	Schooner Bay	4	Emile Ramsammy	David R. Bell	Melnyk Racing Stables	1:46.03
2004	Brass in Pocket	5	Todd Kabel	Robert P. Tiller	Frank Di Giulio, Jr.	1:46.02
2003	Brass in Pocket	4	David Clark	Robert P. Tiller	Frank Di Giulio, Jr.	1:45.98
2002	Brass in Pocket	3	Todd Kabel	Robert P. Tiller	Frank Di Giulio, Jr.	1:43.21
2001	Moonlight Affair	3	Todd Kabel	Tino Attard	Stronach Stables	1:45.19
2000	Katherine of Ascot	4	Constant Montpellier	Reade Baker	Terra Farm	1:45.91
1999	Princess Alicia	3	Patrick Husbands	Sid C. Attard	Goldmart Farms	1:45.15
1998	No Foul Play	4	Steve Bahen	Margaret A. Spencer	Margaret A. Spencer	1:44.80
1997	Blue and Red	5	Rui Pimentel	Sid C. Attard	Jim Dandy Stable	1:42.60
