= Roscoe Goose House =

Historic house in Kentucky, United States

- U.S. National Register of Historic Places
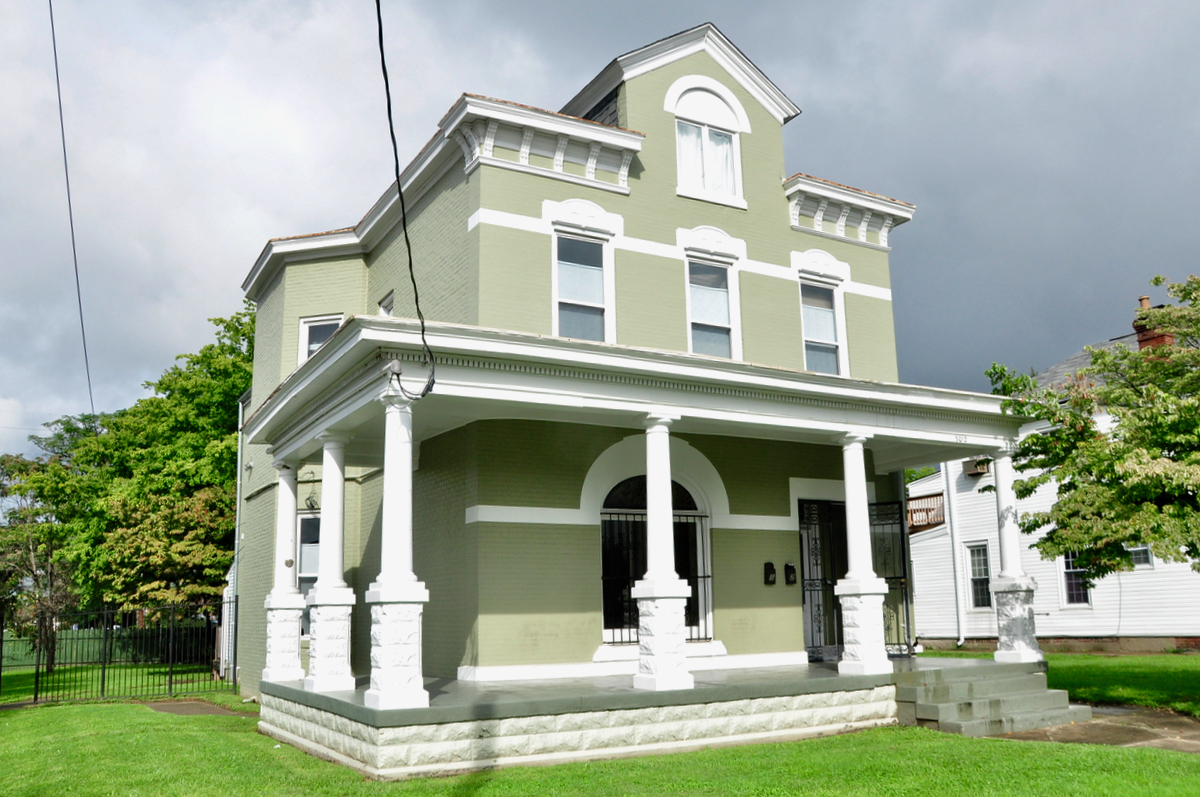

- Location within Kentucky Location within the United States
- Location: 3012 S. 3rd St., Louisville, Kentucky
- Coordinates: 38°12′21″N 85°45′50″W
- Area: 3.7 acres (1.5 ha)
- Built: 1891
- NRHP reference No.: 15000651
- Added to NRHP: September 29, 2015

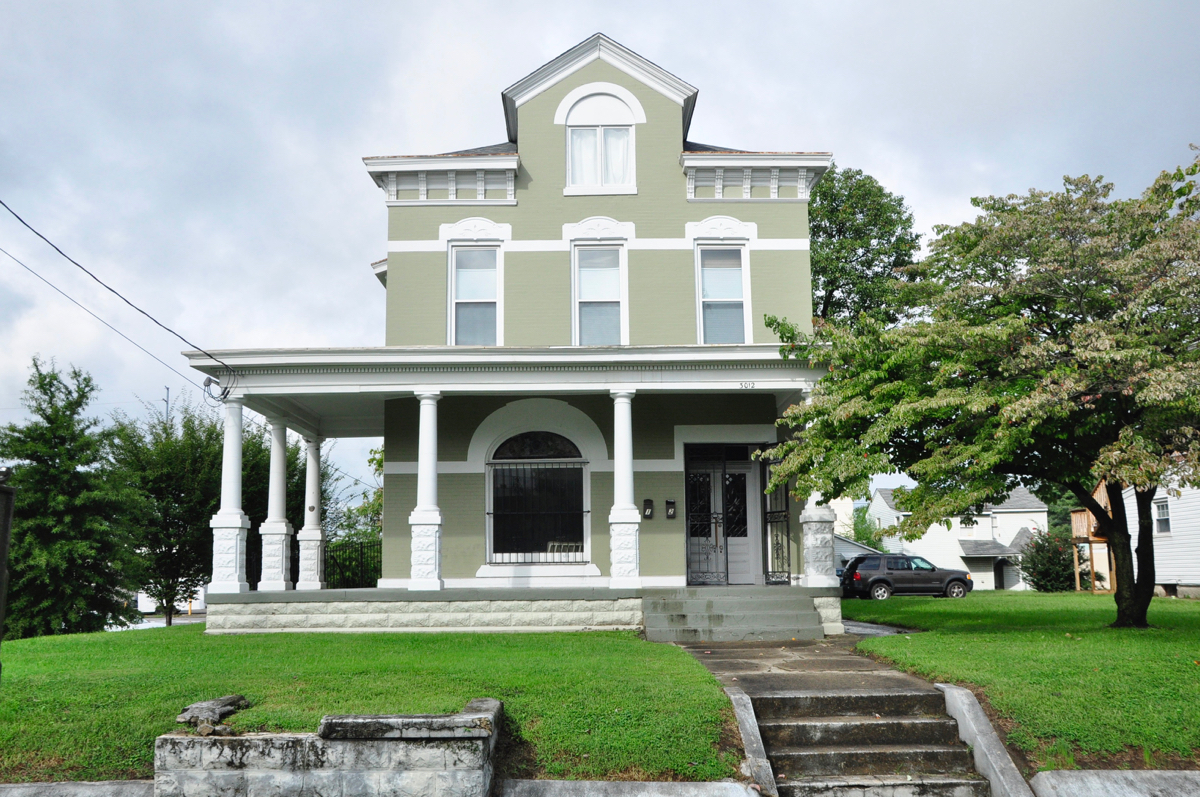
looking west at the east facade of the Roscoe Goose House in Louisville, Kentucky

The Roscoe Goose House is a historic house at 3012 South Third Street in Louisville, Kentucky. Built around 1891, it is a 2 1/2-story brick building with Italianate and later Victorian styling. It has a low-pitch hip roof with bracketed cornice, a wall dormer rising at the center of the front facade, a single-story porch that wraps across the front and around the left side, and a large arched window on the ground floor next to the main entrance. It was home to jockey Roscoe Goose from 1913 until about 1970.

The house was listed on the National Register of Historic Places in 2015.

== See also ==
- National Register of Historic Places listings in Jefferson County, Kentucky
