= Sonny Leon =

Venezuelan horse racing jockey

Sonny Leon is a Venezuelan jockey (born 1989 or 1990 in Aragua, Venezuela). He rode Rich Strike to victory in the 2022 Kentucky Derby, securing the second-largest payout for a winner in the history of the Derby. Rich Strike's victory was the second for a Venezuelan jockey at the Derby, 51 years after Gustavo Ávila rode Canonero II in 1971. The day before his victory in the Kentucky Derby, Leon jockeyed six races at Belterra Park.

Leon has 770 career wins in the United States. Últimas Noticias described Leon as one of the winningest Venezuelan jockeys in the United States.

He lives in Florence, Kentucky.

Following his Kentucky Derby win, Leon served a four-day suspension for careless riding that dated back to an April 27 incident in a $28,000 allowance race. It was his 3rd suspension for careless riding in 9 months.
