= Dance Smartly =

Canadian-bred Thoroughbred racehorse

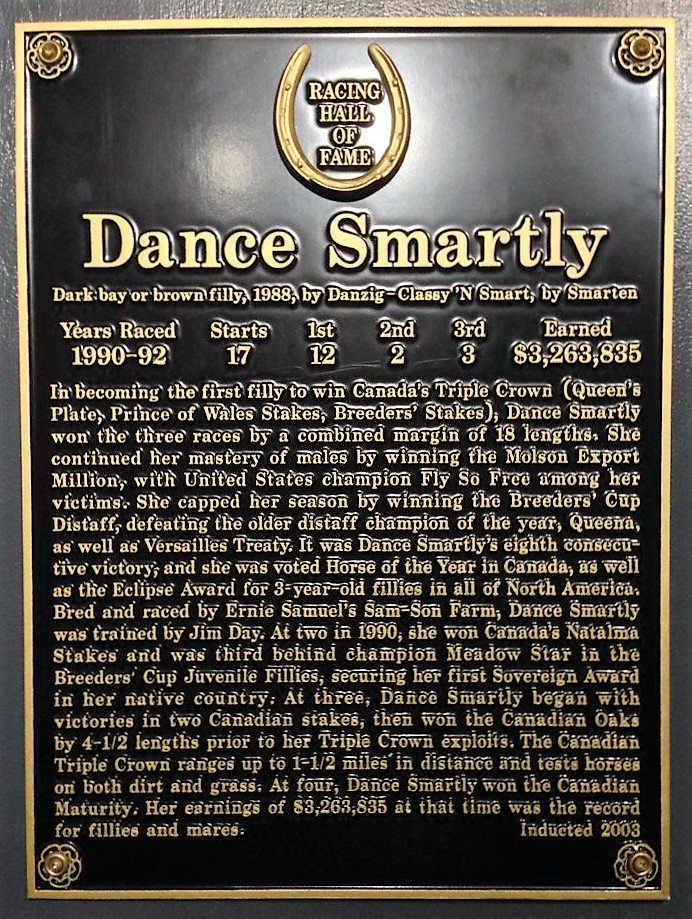
- Dance Smartly's plaque at the National Museum of Racing and Hall of Fame
- Sire: Danzig
- Grandsire: Northern Dancer
- Dam: Classy 'n Smart
- Damsire: Smarten
- Sex: Mare
- Foaled: 1988
- Country: Canada
- Colour: Bay
- Breeder: Sam-Son Farm
- Owner: Sam-Son Farm
- Trainer: James E. Day
- Record: 17: 12-2-3
- Earnings: $3,263,835

Major wins
- Natalma Stakes (1990); Star Shoot Stakes; Selene Stakes; Canadian Oaks (1991); Queen's Plate (1991); Prince of Wales Stakes (1991); Breeders' Stakes (1991); Molson Export Million (1991); Breeders' Cup Distaff (1991); Canadian Maturity Stakes (1992)

Awards
- 10th Canadian Triple Crown Champion (1991); United States Champion 3-Yr-Old Filly (1991); Canadian Horse of the Year (1991); Canadian Champion 3-Year-Old Filly (1991); Sovereign Award for Outstanding Broodmare (2001)

Honours
- Canadian Horse Racing Hall of Fame (1995); United States Racing Hall of Fame (2003); Dance Smartly Stakes at Woodbine Racetrack
- Last updated on 30 September 2011

Dance Smartly (1988–2007) was a Champion Thoroughbred racemare who went undefeated in 1991 while winning the Canadian Triple Crown and becoming the first horse bred in Canada to win a Breeders' Cup race. She was inducted into both the Canadian and American Racing Halls of Fame.

Bred in Ontario by Ernie Samuel's Sam-Son Farm, Dance Smartly was a bay mare with a distinctive white star on her forehead that earned her the nickname Daisy. She was by Danzig, one of Northern Dancer's most influential sire sons. Her dam was the Canadian Hall of Fame mare Classy 'n Smart by Smarten. She was trained by Jim Day.

== Racing career ==
As a two-year-old, Dance Smartly won three of five races, including the Natalma Stakes, and finished third in the Breeders' Cup Juvenile Fillies. She won the Sovereign Award for Canadian champion two-year-old filly.

At age three, she developed into one of the top Thoroughbreds in North America, going undefeated in the 1991 racing season. In her first two starts of the year, she was ridden by Brian Swatuk to easy victories in the Star Shoot and Selene Stakes. In the remainder of her three-year-old campaign, she was ridden by American Hall of Fame jockey Pat Day. Her victory in the Canadian Oaks, Canada's most important race for three-year-old fillies, was so dominant that her owner decided to race her next against the colts. Dance Smartly became the second filly (after Queensway in 1932) to capture the Canadian Triple Crown by winning the Queen's Plate, the Prince of Wales Stakes, and the Breeders' Stakes by a combined eighteen lengths. She next won the Molson Export Million, earning her first graded stakes victory as her previous races had been restricted to Canadian-bred horses.

Preparing for the Breeders' Cup Distaff at Churchill Downs, Dance Smartly started favouring her front hoof and missed several weeks of training. Despite coming into the race with only one workout in six weeks, she won easily, defeating champion older mare Queena and Versailles Treaty. Track announcer Tom Durkin called her "undefeated this year, and the undisputed queen of racing on this continent." For her 1991 performances, Dance Smartly was voted the Eclipse Award as North America's best three-year-old filly plus two Sovereign Awards as Canada's best three-year-old filly and the Horse of the Year.

Despite being hampered by an injury to the suspensory ligament of her right foreleg, Dance Smartly raced four more times at age four, winning once against colts in the Canadian Maturity Stakes. She also finished second by a nose in the King Edward Cup Handicap and third in the Grade I Beverly D. She then retired as the number one money-winning filly in the world, having won on both turf and dirt, and at distances of up to 1 1/2 miles.

== Broodmare record ==
As a broodmare at Sam-Son Farm, Dance Smartly produced a number of top horses, including the back-to-back Queen's Plate winners Scatter the Gold and Dancethruthedawn (who also won the Go For Wand Handicap), both by Mr. Prospector. She was named the 2001 Canadian Broodmare of the Year.

Dance Smartly was euthanized in August 2007 after suffering an irreparable injury related to an arthritic stifle in her paddock at Sam-Son Farm. She was 19 years old and not in foal at the time.

"Dance Smartly was a once in a lifetime horse," said Tammy Samuel-Balaz, the daughter of Dance Smartly's owner. "She was magic and gave us incredible thrills as both a racehorse and a broodmare. While we were fortunate enough to have bred and owned her, she was truly Canada's horse."

== Honours ==
Dance Smartly was inducted into the Canadian Horse Racing Hall of Fame in 1995 and into the National Museum of Racing and Hall of Fame at Saratoga Springs, New York in 2003. In 1996, the Dance Smartly Stakes was created in her honour.

== Pedigree ==
Dance Smartly was by Danzig, the leading sire in North America from 1991 to 1993. Her dam was Classy 'n Smart, who won the Canadian Oaks and was named the Canadian champion three-year-old in 1984. Classy 'n Smart produced several other stakes winners including Smart Strike, a grade I winner and two-time leading sire in North America. Dance Smartly's second dam No Class was the foundation mare of Sam-Son Farms, producing six stakes winners and four champions including Sky Classic. No Class, Classy 'n Smart and Dance Smartly were each named Canadian Broodmare of the Year.

Pedigree of Dance Smartly (CAN), bay mare, 1988
Sire Danzig (USA) 1977	Northern Dancer (CAN); 1961	Nearctic	Nearco
Sire Danzig (USA) 1977	Northern Dancer (CAN); 1961	Nearctic	Lady Angela
Sire Danzig (USA) 1977	Northern Dancer (CAN); 1961	Natalma	Native Dancer
Sire Danzig (USA) 1977	Northern Dancer (CAN); 1961	Natalma	Almahmoud
Sire Danzig (USA) 1977	Pas de Nom; 1968	Admiral's Voyage	Crafty Admiral
Sire Danzig (USA) 1977	Pas de Nom; 1968	Admiral's Voyage	Olympia Lou
Sire Danzig (USA) 1977	Pas de Nom; 1968	Petitioner	Petition
Sire Danzig (USA) 1977	Pas de Nom; 1968	Petitioner	Steady Aim
Dam Classy 'n Smart (CAN) 1981	Smarten	Cyane	Turn-To
Dam Classy 'n Smart (CAN) 1981	Smarten	Cyane	Your Game
Dam Classy 'n Smart (CAN) 1981	Smarten	Smartaire	Quibu
Dam Classy 'n Smart (CAN) 1981	Smarten	Smartaire	Art Teacher
Dam Classy 'n Smart (CAN) 1981	No Class	Nodouble	Noholme
Dam Classy 'n Smart (CAN) 1981	No Class	Nodouble	Alba-Jay
Dam Classy 'n Smart (CAN) 1981	No Class	Classy Quillo	Outing Class
Dam Classy 'n Smart (CAN) 1981	No Class	Classy Quillo	Quillopoly (family 23-b)

== See also ==
- List of racehorses
