= Classy 'n Smart =

Canadian-bred Thoroughbred racehorse

- Sire: Smarten
- Grandsire: Cyane
- Dam: No Class
- Damsire: Nodouble
- Sex: Filly
- Foaled: May 20, 1981
- Died: September 28, 1999 (aged 18)
- Country: Canada
- Colour: Bay
- Breeder: Sam-Son Farm
- Owner: Sam-Son Farm
- Trainer: James E. Day
- Record: 9: 5-3-0
- Earnings: $303,222 (converted from Canadian earnings)

Major wins
- Fury Stakes (1984); Bison City Stakes (1984); Ontario Colleen Handicap (1984); Canadian Oaks (1984)

Awards
- Canadian Champion 3-Year-Old Filly (1984); Canadian Broodmare of the Year (1991)

Honours
- Canadian Horse Racing Hall of Fame (2004); Classy 'N Smart Stakes at Woodbine Racetrack

Classy 'n Smart (May 20, 1981 – September 28, 1999) was a Canadian Hall of Fame Thoroughbred racehorse. Bred and raced by Sam-Son Farm, she won five of nine career starts, including two legs of what would later be known as the Canadian Triple Tiara. Although she was voted the 1984 Canadian Champion 3-Year-Old Filly, her primary legacy is as a champion broodmare.

== Background ==
Classy 'n Smart was bred by and raced for Ernie Samuel's Sam-Son Farm. She was trained by Jim Day, an Olympic gold medal winner in show jumping who became a Sovereign Award winning racehorse trainer.

Classy 'n Smart was sired by Smarten, a tough and consistent racehorse who became a leading regional sire in Maryland. She was produced by the misnamed mare No Class, by Nodouble. No Class was one of the foundation mares on which the success of Sam-Son Farm was built and was inducted into the Canadian Horse Racing Hall of Fame in 1997. In addition to Classy 'n Smart, No Class was the dam of Canadian champions Grey Classic, Regal Classic and Sky Classic, the latter also the 1992 American champion male turf horse.

== Racing career ==
Classy 'n Smart was unraced at age two, but won in her racing debut on May 24, 1984, at Woodbine Racetrack. She then stepped up in class to win the Fury Stakes on June 3 before finishing second in the Selene Stakes on June 17.

Classy 'n Smart's next start was on July 2 in the 9-furlong Canadian Oaks (now known as the Woodbine Oaks), the most prestigious race for Canadian-bred three-year-old fillies. Classy 'n Smart stamped herself as the best filly of her generation with a wire-to-wire victory. It was the first of five Oaks wins for Jim Day and the first of seven Oaks wins for Sam-Son Farm.

On August 4, Classy 'n Smart finished second in the 7-furlong Duchess Stakes. Two weeks later, she won the Bison City Stakes, now the second leg of the Canadian Triple Tiara, at Fort Erie Racetrack. On September 8, she followed up with a win in the Ontario Colleen Handicap, run over Woodbine's turf course. She then finished second when she tackled older fillies and mares in the Canadian Stakes on October 7.

Classy 'n Smart's final start was in the Grade I Spinster Stakes at Keeneland, where she finished sixth behind champion racemare Princess Rooney. She finished her career with a record of five wins and three second-placed finishes from nine starts. She was named the Canadian Champion Three-Year-Old Filly of 1984.

== Broodmare ==
For all her talent on the racecourse, Classy 'n Smart is best known as an outstanding producer, causing her to be given the Sovereign Award for Outstanding Broodmare in 1991. She produced nine foals, five of whom were winners. Her foals include:

- Secret 'n Classy (foaled 1987, by Secretariat) – won four races and placed in the Breeders' Stakes. Became a stallion in Germany then the Czech Republic.
- Dance Smartly (1988, by Danzig) – inducted in the Canadian Horse Racing Hall of Fame as well as the United States Racing Hall of Fame. Dance Smartly went undefeated in 1991 while winning the Canadian Triple Crown and becoming the first horse bred in Canada to ever win a Breeders' Cup race. She retired as the richest filly in world racing history with earnings of US$3,263,835. Dance Smartly then became the third generation in her family to be named Canada's outstanding broodmare. She was the dam of Scatter The Gold, winner of two of the three Canadian Triple Crown races, as well as Dancethruthedawn who won the Grade I Go For Wand Handicap at Saratoga Race Course in the United States and Canada's most prestigious race, the Queen's Plate.
- Seattle Classic (1991, by Seattle Slew) – unraced but produced Canadian champion filly Hello Seattle and stakes winner Sail From Seattle, a Group I sire in South Africa.
- Smart Strike (1992, by Mr. Prospector) – a multiple graded stakes race winner and the Leading sire in North America in 2007 and 2008. His progeny includes two-time American Horse of the Year Curlin, Canadian Horse of the Year Soaring Free, and American Champion Male Turf Horse English Channel. Smart Strike is also an important sire of sires, led by Curlin and English Channel. Smart Strike is also the damsire of Kentucky Derby winner Mine That Bird, Queen's Plate winner Eye of the Leopard, and Preakness Stakes winner Seize the Grey.
- Dance Swiftly (1995, by Danzig) – unraced but produced graded stakes winner Speightster and listed stakes winners Paiota Falls and West Coast Swing
- Strike Smartly (1997, by Mr. Prospector) – won the 2002 Chinese Cultural Center Stakes (now called the Nijinsky Stakes). Became a sire in South Africa where he sired at least 13 stakes winners.
- Full of Wonder (1998, by Mr. Prospector) – won the 2002 Niagara Breeders' Cup Handicap (now called the Northern Dancer Stakes). Exported to China in 2004.

Classy 'n Smart died at age eighteen on September 28, 1999, at Sam-Son Farm. Inaugurated in 1997, the Classy 'N Smart Stakes at Woodbine Racetrack was named in her honor. In 2004, she was inducted in the Canadian Horse Racing Hall of Fame.

== Pedigree ==
Pedigree of Classy 'n Smart, bay mare, foaled May 20, 1981
Sire Smarten dark bay or brown 1976	Cyane b. 1959	Turn-To b. 1951	Royal Charger
Sire Smarten dark bay or brown 1976	Cyane b. 1959	Turn-To b. 1951	Source Sucree
Sire Smarten dark bay or brown 1976	Cyane b. 1959	Your Game br. 1948	Beau Pere
Sire Smarten dark bay or brown 1976	Cyane b. 1959	Your Game br. 1948	Winkle
Sire Smarten dark bay or brown 1976	Smartaire dkb/br. 1962	Quibu b. 1942	Meadow
Sire Smarten dark bay or brown 1976	Smartaire dkb/br. 1962	Quibu b. 1942	Querendona
Sire Smarten dark bay or brown 1976	Smartaire dkb/br. 1962	Art Teacher dkb/br. 1958	Olympia
Sire Smarten dark bay or brown 1976	Smartaire dkb/br. 1962	Art Teacher dkb/br. 1958	Teaching
Dam No Class bay 1974	Nodouble ch. 1965	Noholme ch. 1956	Star Kingdom
Dam No Class bay 1974	Nodouble ch. 1965	Noholme ch. 1956	Oceana
Dam No Class bay 1974	Nodouble ch. 1965	Abla-Jay b. 1955	Double Jay
Dam No Class bay 1974	Nodouble ch. 1965	Abla-Jay b. 1955	Ablamucha
Dam No Class bay 1974	Classy Quillo dkb/br. 1969	Outing Class dkb/br. 1960	Nasrullah
Dam No Class bay 1974	Classy Quillo dkb/br. 1969	Outing Class dkb/br. 1960	Track Medal
Dam No Class bay 1974	Classy Quillo dkb/br. 1969	Quillopoly b. 1958	Princequillo
Dam No Class bay 1974	Classy Quillo dkb/br. 1969	Quillopoly b. 1958	Tonga (Family 23-b)
