= Big Drama =

American-bred Thoroughbred racehorse

- Sire: Montbrook
- Grandsire: Buckaroo
- Dam: Riveting Drama
- Damsire: Notebook
- Sex: (colt)
- Foaled: February 14, 2006
- Died: January 25, 2021 (aged 14)
- Country: United States
- Colour: Dark Bay
- Breeder: Harold Queen
- Owner: Harold Queen
- Trainer: David Fawkes
- Record: 17: 10 - 4 - 1
- Earnings: $2,746,060

Major wins
- Delta Jackpot Stakes (2008); Affirmed Stakes (2008); Dr. Fager Stakes (2008); In Reality Stakes (2008); Red Legend Stakes (2009); Smile Sprint Handicap (2010); Mr. Prospector Stakes (2011); Breeders' Cup wins: Breeders' Cup Sprint (2010)

Awards
- American Champion Sprint Horse (2010)
- Last updated on April 27, 2012

Big Drama (February 14, 2006 – January 25, 2021) was a Thoroughbred racehorse. He was euthanized in January 2021 following complications with a stomach issue.

== Background ==
Big Drama was a dark bay bred in Florida by his owner Harold Queen. He was trained by David Fawkes.

He was sired by Montbrook out of Riveting Drama.

== Racing career ==
Big Drama's two-year-old campaign included winning the Grade III Delta Jackpot and all three legs of the Florida Stallion Series, making him one of only six two-year-olds to do so in the twenty-seven-year history of the series.

Highlights of his three-year-old year include winning the Red Legend Stakes at Charles Town Races and Slots. He set the 7-furlong track record of 1:20.88 in the Grade II Swale Stakes at Gulfstream, although he was disqualified from the win and placed second due to bumping This Ones for Phil. Big Drama finished fifth in the 2009 Preakness Stakes at Pimlico Race Course in Baltimore, Maryland, after bobbling at the start. Big Drama competed in the Grade III West Virginia Derby on August 1, 2009, where he was beaten by a head by Soul Warrior.

At age 4, on November 6, 2010, Big Drama, trained by David Fawkes and ridden by Eibar Coa, won the Breeders' Cup Sprint at Churchill Downs.

He won the 2010 Eclipse Award "American Champion Sprint Horse" Votes: Big Drama, 170; Majesticperfection, 61; Discreetly Mine, 4

In his 5-year-old debut, Big Drama returned to Gulfstream Park on January 15, 2011, and set a track record of 1:08.12 for 6 furlongs in the Mr. Prospector Stakes. He earned a Beyer Speed Figure of 120 for this race.
