= Roscoe Goose =

American jockey (1891–1971)

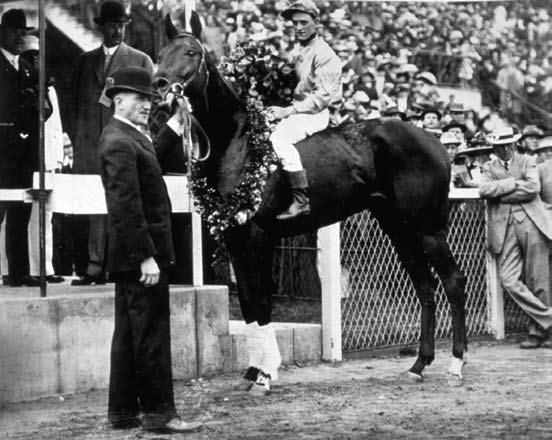
- Goose atop his Kentucky Derby winning horse, Donerail

Personal information
- Born: January 21, 1891 Louisville, Kentucky, U.S.
- Died: June 11, 1971 (aged 80) Louisville, Kentucky, U.S.
- Resting place: Cave Hill Cemetery; Louisville, Kentucky, U.S.
- Occupations: Jockey; Horse trainer

Horse racing career
- Sport: Horse racing
- Career wins: Not found

Major racing wins
- Clark Handicap (1913); Debutante Stakes (1913); Bashford Manor Stakes (1915); Cherokee Handicap (1915, 1916); Louisville Cup (1915); Kentucky Oaks (1916) American Classic Race wins: Kentucky Derby (1913) As a trainer: Arlington-Washington Lassie Stakes (1940)

Honours
- Kentucky Athletic Hall of Fame (1963)

Significant horses
- Donerail

Roscoe Tarleton Goose (January 21, 1891 – June 11, 1971) was an American jockey in Thoroughbred racing who was one of the inaugural class of inductees in the Kentucky Athletic Hall of Fame.

== Life and career ==
Born near Louisville, Kentucky, Roscoe Goose won a number of races, the most important of which came in 1913 when he captured the Kentucky Derby with the colt, Donerail. Sent off at 91:1 odds, Roscoe Goose stunned racing fans with a win that returned backers $184.90 for a $2 wager, a Derby record which still stands. Dubbed The Golden Goose, when his career as a jockey came to an end he remained in the Thoroughbred racing industry as a trainer and an owner. In 1928, he was the leading trainer at Arlington Park in Chicago and in 1931 was training at Ellis Park Race Course in Henderson, Kentucky. In 1940 he was back at Chicago's Arlington Park where he trained the winner of the Arlington-Washington Lassie Stakes.

Roscoe Goose also acted as an adviser to buyers of horses and served as president of the Kentucky Thoroughbred Breeders Association for three years. Success in racing and wise management of his money made him a very wealthy man. In 1974, author Earl Ruby, with an introduction by U.S. Racing Hall of Fame inductee Eddie Arcaro, told his life story in a book titled The Golden Goose; story of the jockey who won the most stunning Kentucky Derby and then became a millionaire

In 1963, Roscoe Goose was one of the inaugural class of inductees in the Kentucky Athletic Hall of Fame. He is honored with an engraved bronze plaque on display at the Kentucky Exposition Center's Freedom Hall in Louisville.

== Roscoe Goose and Jimmy Winkfield ==
In his 2004 book Wink: The Incredible Life and Epic Journey of Jimmy Winkfield, author Ed Hotaling wrote of an incident involving Roscoe Goose at one of the events leading up to the May 6, 1961 running of the Kentucky Derby. Told to the author by Jimmy Winkfield's son, the story was part of publisher McGraw-Hill's press release and has been repeated in numerous publications. The book recounts what happened when Winkfield, an African-American jockey and two-time winner of the Derby who was inducted in the U.S. Racing Hall of Fame, was an invited guest at the National Turfwriters Association banquet held at Louisville's historic Brown Hotel. On his arrival, Winkfield and his daughter Liliane were denied entrance through the front door of the then-still segregated hotel. Decades earlier, prejudice had forced Winkfield out of American racing and he had had to seek work and a new life in Europe. Now, the seventy-nine-year-old Winkfield stood his ground and requested they be allowed in. They were eventually admitted but received the cold shoulder from everyone and were left to sit alone at their table. However, when Roscoe Goose recognized who it was, the white millionaire came over and spent time at their table. Included in Ed Hotaling's book is one of the last public photos ever taken of Jimmy Winkfield showing him and Roscoe Goose sitting together at the ensuing running of the Kentucky Derby.

== Family, death and legacy ==
Goose's brother Carl was also a jockey who won the 1913 Kentucky Oaks but shortly after died at age 22 in a racing accident on October 15, 1915, at Latonia Race Track.

Roscoe Goose died in Louisville, Kentucky in 1971 at the age of 80. His former home is on the National Register of Historic Places. He is buried in Louisville's Cave Hill Cemetery.

The 2006 single "Roscoe" by American indie folk band Midlake makes a titular and lyrical reference to Goose, further elaborated upon in the lyric "been born in 1891".
