= Mr. Prospector Stakes =

Grade III American Thoroughbred horse race

- Class: Grade III
- Location: Gulfstream Park; Hallandale Beach, Florida, United States
- Inaugurated: 1946 (as Hallandale Handicap)
- Race type: Thoroughbred – Flat racing – Dirt
- Website: Gulfstream Park

Race information
- Distance: 7 furlongs
- Surface: Dirt
- Track: Left-handed
- Qualification: Three year olds and older
- Weight: Base weights with allowances: 4-year-olds and older: 126 lbs. 3-year-olds: 124 lbs.
- Purse: US$165,000 (since 2024)

The Mr. Prospector Stakes is a Grade III American Thoroughbred horse race open for three years old or older, over a distance of 7 furlongs on the dirt track held annually in December at Gulfstream Park, Hallandale Beach, Florida. The event currently carries a purse of $165,000.

== History ==
The event is named in honor of the outstanding breeding stallion and notable sire of sires Mr. Prospector who held the 6 furlongs track record at Gulfstream Park.

The race was inaugurated in 1946 and the event was run as the Hallandale Handicap. The conditions of the race were open for three year olds over a distance of 1 1/16 miles. The following two runnings were extended to three years olds and older and the distance extended to 9 furlongs. The race was not run in 1949 and was resumed in 1950 under the name Hallandale Purse. In 1956 the event was run under the original naming of Hallandale Handicap. In 1957 again the event was not held. From 1958 to 1971 the event was run again as the Hallandale Purse.

The 1970s were an unstable period for the event. From 1972 –74 the event was not held and the 1975 event was moved to Calder Racecourse. In 1978 the event was held as a long distance 2 mile turf event. The race was run two more times over the turf in 1980 and 1982 before it was converted to a dirt sprint race over 6 furlongs in 1983.

In 1999 the event was upgraded to Grade III and in 2001 the event was renamed to the Mr. Prospector Handicap. Since 2009 the event has been run under the current name Mr. Prospector Stakes and from 2018 over the current distance of 7 furlongs.

The event has attracted some notable sprinters to Gulfstream Park including 2010 American Champion Sprint Horse Big Drama and 2019 Dubai Golden Shaheen winner X Y Jet who won this event twice.

== Records ==
Speed record:

- 6 furlongs: 1:08.12 – Big Drama (2011)
- 7 furlongs: 1:21.36 – Diamond Oops (2019)

Margins:

- 9 1/4 lengths – X Y Jet (2015)

Most wins:

- 2 - X Y Jet (2015, 2017)
- 2 - Sibelius (2022, 2023)

Most wins by a jockey:

- 4 – Jerry D. Bailey (1989, 1992, 1994, 2001)

Most wins by a trainer:

- 2 - Benjamin W. Perkins Jr. (1991, 1993)
- 2 - William H. Turner Jr. (1983, 1997)
- 2 - Steve Margolis (2003, 2004)
- 2 - Steven M. Asmussen (2006, 2008)
- 2 - Eddie Kenneally (2007, 2010)
- 2 - David Fawkes (2011 January & December)
- 2 - Martin D. Wolfson (2009, 2012)
- 2 - Jorge Navarro (2015, 2017)
- 2 - Todd A. Pletcher (1998, 2018)
- 2 - Jeremiah O'Dwyer (2022, 2023)

== Winners ==
| Year | Winner | Age | Jockey | Trainer | Owner | Distance | Time | Purse | Grade | Ref |
|---|---|---|---|---|---|---|---|---|---|---|
Mr. Prospector Stakes
| 2025 | Knightsbridge | 4 | Junior Alvarado | William I. Mott | Godolphin Racing | 7 furlongs | 1:22.32 | $150,000 | III | |
| 2024 | Mufasa (CHI) | 5 | Tyler Gaffalione | Ignacio Correas IV | Carlos Saavedra & Stud Vendaval | 7 furlongs | 1:22.47 | $150,000 | III | |
| 2023 | Sibelius | 5 | Junior Alvarado | Jeremiah O'Dwyer | Jun H. Park & Delia Nash | 7 furlongs | 1:23.16 | $125,000 | III | |
| 2022 | Sibelius | 4 | Junior Alvarado | Jeremiah O'Dwyer | Jun H. Park & Delia Nash | 7 furlongs | 1:23.04 | $125,000 | III | |
| 2021 | Officiating | 4 | Luis Saez | Saffie Joseph Jr. | Vegso Racing Stable | 7 furlongs | 1:22.28 | $100,000 | III | |
| 2020 | Sleepy Eyes Todd | 4 | Tyler Gaffalione | Miguel Silva | Thumbs Up Racing | 7 furlongs | 1:21.67 | $100,000 | III | |
| 2019 | Diamond Oops | 4 | Julien R. Leparoux | Patrick L. Biancone | Diamond 100 Racing, A. Dunne, D P Racing & P.L. Biancone Racing | 7 furlongs | 1:21.36 | $100,000 | III | |
| 2018 | Coal Front | 4 | John R. Velazquez | Todd A. Pletcher | R.V. LaPenta & Head of Plains Partners | 7 furlongs | 1:23.16 | $100,000 | III | |
| 2017 | X Y Jet | 4 | Emisael Jaramillo | Jorge Navarro | Rockingham Ranch and Gelfenstein Farm | 6 furlongs | 1:09.45 | $100,000 | III | December |
| 2017† | Squadron A | 7 | Corey J. Lanerie | Dale L. Romans | Carolyn Vogel | 6 furlongs | 1:10.23 | $100,000 | III | January |
| 2015 | X Y Jet | 3 | Emisael Jaramillo | Jorge Navarro | Gelfenstein Farm | 6 furlongs | 1:08.56 | $102,000 | III | |
| 2014 | Speechify | 4 | Paco Lopez | Ralph E. Nicks | Team Valor International | 6 furlongs | 1:09.54 | $100,000 | III | |
| 2013 | Singanothersong | 3 | Juan C. Leyva | Ronald Pellegrini | Herman Van Den Broec | 6 furlongs | 1:09.92 | $100,000 | III | |
| 2012 | Indiano | 4 | Luis Saez | Martin D. Wolfson | Stud El Aguila | 6 furlongs | 1:10.26 | $98,000 | III | |
| 2011♯ | Apriority | 4 | Luis Saez | David Fawkes | Donald R. Dizney | 6 furlongs | 1:09.28 | $100,000 | III | December |
| 2011 | Big Drama | 5 | Eibar Coa | David Fawkes | Harold L. Queen | 6 furlongs | 1:08.12 | $100,000 | III | January |
| 2010 | Custom for Carlos | 4 | Julien R. Leparoux | Eddie Kenneally | Homewrecker Racing & Avalon Farm | 6 furlongs | 1:10.07 | $98,000 | III | |
| 2009 | Ikigai | 4 | Jermaine V. Bridgmohan | Martin D. Wolfson | Edmund A. Gann | 6 furlongs | 1:09.37 | $100,000 | III | |
Mr. Prospector Handicap
| 2008 | Noonmark | 5 | René R. Douglas | Steven M. Asmussen | George Bolton, Joan Corrigan & Anton Beck | 6 furlongs | 1:09.72 | $100,000 | III | |
| 2007 | Kelly's Landing | 6 | Edgar S. Prado | Eddie Kenneally | Summerplace Farm | 6 furlongs | 1:08.84 | $100,000 | III | |
| 2006 | Gaff | 4 | Shaun Bridgmohan | Steven M. Asmussen | Heiligbrodt Racing Stable & Michael Smurfit | 6 furlongs | 1:08.50 | $100,000 | III | |
| 2005 | Saratoga County | 4 | Javier Castellano | George Weaver | Evelyn M. Pollard | 6 furlongs | 1:08.99 | $100,000 | III | |
| 2004 | Cajun Beat | 4 | Cornelio H. Velasquez | Steve Margolis | Padua Stables and John & Joseph Iracane | 6 furlongs | 1:09.06 | $100,000 | III | |
| 2003 | Baileys Edge | 6 | Gary Boulanger | Steve Margolis | Holm Thoroughbreds | 6 furlongs | 1:09.95 | $100,000 | III | |
| 2002 | Hook and Ladder | 5 | John R. Velazquez | John C. Kimmel | Chester & Mary Broman | 6 furlongs | 1:09.69 | $100,000 | III | |
| 2001 | Istintaj | 5 | Jerry D. Bailey | Mark A. Hennig | Shadwell Stable | 6 furlongs | 1:09.63 | $120,000 | III | |
Hallandale Handicap
| 2000 | Mountain Top | 5 | José A. Santos | William W. Perry | John D. Murphy Sr | 6 furlongs | 1:10.80 | $75,000 | III | |
| 1999 | Cowboy Cop | 5 | Pat Day | Patrick B. Byrne | Stronach Stables | 6 furlongs | 1:09.65 | $75,000 | III | |
| 1998 | Rare Rock | 5 | Pat Day | Todd A. Pletcher | Betty G. Massey & Jake J. Pletcher | 6 furlongs | 1:08.67 | $75,000 | Listed | |
| 1997 | Punch Line | 7 | Pat Day | William H. Turner Jr. | Althea D. Richard | 6 furlongs | 1:08.45 | $75,000 | Listed | |
| 1996 | Meadow Monster | 5 | Rick Wilson | Ben W. Perkins Sr. | New Farm | 6 furlongs | 1:09.47 | $50,000 | Listed | |
| 1995 | Sweet Beast | 5 | Mike E. Smith | Robert J. Durso | Howard G. Crowell & Gerald Gallo | 6 furlongs | 1:09.36 | $50,000 | Listed | |
| 1994 | Binalong | 5 | Jerry D. Bailey | Carl A. Nafzger | Jim Tafe | 6 furlongs | 1:09.68 | $50,000 | Listed | |
| 1993 | Surely Six | 4 | Rick Wilson | Benjamin W. Perkins Jr. | Candy Stables | 7 furlongs | 1:21.85 | $50,000 | Listed | |
| 1992 | Take Me Out | 4 | Jerry D. Bailey | William I. Mott | Bertram R. Firestone | 7 furlongs | 1:23.75 | $50,000 | Listed | |
| 1991 | Stalker | 4 | Craig Perret | Benjamin W. Perkins Jr. | Anthony F. Tornetta | 7 furlongs | 1:22.50 | $50,000 | Listed | |
| 1990 | Beau Genius | 5 | Bill Shoemaker | Gerald S. Bennett | Dr. D. Brian Davidson | 7 furlongs | 1:23.20 | $50,000 | Listed | |
| 1989 | Miami Slick | 4 | Jerry D. Bailey | Edward Plesa Jr. | Loretta Kessler | 6 furlongs | 1:09.20 | $57,000 | Listed | |
| 1988 | Jato D'Agua (BRZ) | 6 | Walter Guerra | Paul Cheng | Haras Rosa Do Sul | 6 furlongs | 1:09.80 | $63,600 | Listed | |
| 1987 | Uncle Ho | 4 | José A. Santos | H. Allen Jerkens | Sugartown Stable | 7 furlongs | 1:22.60 | $46,640 | Listed | |
| 1986 | Fortunate Prospect | 5 | Roger I. Velez | LeRoy Jolley | Gerald Robins | 6 furlongs | 1:10.40 | $47,680 | | |
| 1985 | For Halo | 4 | Bryan Fann | Mary L. Edens | Mrs. Adele W. Paxson | 6 furlongs | 1:09.60 | $62,700 | | |
Hallandale Stakes
| 1984 | D. White | 4 | Alex O. Solis | Frank A. Alexander | Albert Davis | 1 1/16 miles | 1:44.40 | $40,640 | | |
Hallandale Handicap
| 1983 | Chan Balum | 4 | Jean-Luc Samyn | William H. Turner Jr. | Barbara W. Labrot | 6 furlongs | 1:10.00 | $42,805 | | |
| 1982 | Noble Warrior | 6 | Odin J. Londono | Jose A. Mendez | Wanda Hooper | 1 1/2 miles | 2:27.20 | $30,975 | | |
| 1981 | Race not held | | | | | | | | | |
At Calder Racecourse
| 1980¤ | Gun Steward | 3 | Ramon Sargardia | J. Carroll Barnhill | Billy Lee Joseph | abt. 1 1/8 miles | 1:47.80 | $32,938 | October | Division 1 |
| 1980¤ | Two's A Plenty | 3 | Walter Guerra | Merritt A. Buxton | Merritt A. Buxton & Alfred Smith | abt. 1 1/8 miles | 1:48.20 | $32,637 | October | Division 2 |
At Gulfstream Park
| 1980 | Archie Beamish | 7 | Walter Guerra | Robert F. Connors | Walter F. Wickes Jr. | 1 1/2 miles | 2:27.20 | $24,950 | | May |
| 1979 | Race not held | | | | | | | | | |
| 1978 | Practitioner | 5 | Juan A. Santiago | Leo Sierra | Dogwood Stable | 2 miles | 3:18.20 | $24,200 | | |
| 1976–1977 | | Race not held | | | | | | | | |
At Calder Racecourse
| 1975 | Indian Ambush | 5 | Wayne Crews | William R. Smith | William R. Smith & Sunrise Farm | 1 1/8 miles | 1:54.40 | $30,000 | | |

Legend:
Dirt Turf
Notes:
† Gulfstream Park administration moved the event to New Year's Day in their 2016–17 meeting from the usual December scheduling. Hence, there were two runnings of the event in the calendar year for 2017 and no running in 2016
♯ In 2011 the event was held twice in the calendar year. For the 2010–11 meeting the event was held in January and in the 2011–12 meeting the event was held in December
¤ In 1980 the event was scheduled at Gulfstream Park in May. The event was also scheduled at Calder Racecourse in October and run in split divisions.

=== Earlier Winners ===
The following lists are earlier winners of the event.

Hallandale Purse (1958–1971)

- 1971 – Smooth It
- 1970 – Stop Time
- 1969 – One For All
- 1968 – Go Marching
- 1967 – Irish Rebellion
- 1966 – Flaps Down
- 1965‡ – Tibidabo / I'm Rusty
- 1964 – Clem Pac
- 1963 – Jet Traffic
- 1962 – Summer Savory
- 1961 – Noble Turn
- 1960 – McPhee
- 1959 – Roman Colonel
- 1958 – Rockmoore

Hallandale Handicap (1956)

- 1957 – Race not held
- 1956 – Galdar

Hallandale Purse (1950–1955)

- 1955 – Deb Chaser
- 1954 – Better Goods
- 1953 – Elixir
- 1952 – Mass Ogold
- 1951 – Ocean Drive
- 1950 – Gangway

Hallandale Handicap (1946–1948)

- 1949 – Race not held
- 1948 – Harmonica
- 1947 – Kingarvie
- 1946 – Roberto

Notes:
‡ Event run in two divisions

== See also ==
List of American and Canadian Graded races
