= Canadian Thoroughbred Horse Society =

The Canadian Thoroughbred Horse Society (CTHS) is an organization headquartered in Toronto, Ontario, Canada that was founded in 1906 to assist Thoroughbred horse breeders. Since 1982, there have been provincial divisions in Alberta, British Columbia, Manitoba, Ontario, Quebec and Saskatchewan.
