= Smarten =

American Thoroughbred racehorse (1976–2003)

- Sire: Cyane
- Grandsire: Turn-To
- Dam: Smartaire
- Damsire: Quibu
- Sex: Stallion
- Foaled: April 17, 1976
- Country: United States
- Colour: Bay
- Breeder: Jim & Eleanor Ryan
- Owner: Ryehill Farm
- Trainer: Woody Stephens
- Record: 27: 11-8-2
- Earnings: US$716,426

Major wins
- Illinois Derby(1979); Pennsylvania Derby (1979); American Derby (1979); Woodlawn Stakes (1979); Ohio Derby (1979); Marylander Handicap (1979); Senatorial Stakes (1978); City Of Miami Handicap (1978)

Smarten (April 17, 1976 – March 31, 2003) was an American Thoroughbred racehorse and successful sire. Bred in Maryland by Jim and Eleanor Ryan and raced under their Ryehill Farm banner, he had a record of 27: 11-8-2 with career earnings of $716,426.

== Early career ==
Smarten won in route races, sprint, on the dirt, on the turf. Smarten was a consistent colt that performed well in every outing. His winning percentage was of 11 out of 27 or 41%, but his in-the-money percentage of 22 of 27 lifetime is higher than many thoroughbreds racing over two dozen times at an incredible 81%.

In his two-year-old season he won four of five races that included a maiden win, an allowance win and two stakes wins. He won the City of Miami Handicap a stakes race for two-year-olds at Calder Race Course. Smarten also won the Senatorial Stakes at Laurel Park Racecourse in the winter of 1978.

== Three-year-old season ==
In his sophomore year of 1979, Smarten, trainer Woody Stephens and jockey Sam Maple teamed up and as a result of this, Smarten placed in the top three in 15 of 17 races in one year including six graded stakes wins-Woodlawn, Illinois Derby, Pennsylvania Derby, Ohio Derby, American Derby, Marylander in a row. Also, six graded stakes runner-up finishes-in a row-Travers, Secretariat, Lawrence Realization, Rutgers Handicap, Meadowlands Cup, Discovery. Maple rode Smarten to wins in four grade two Derbys, capturing the Illinois, the Pennsylvania Derby, the American and the Ohio while placing a close second by a head in the grade two Arkansas Derby.

His trainer was meticulous about planning and picking the right spots for his colt. Stephens intentionally avoided hooking up with that year's super horse Spectacular Bid in the Triple Crown races. He was quoted as saying, "why run in a race for place money when I can run in a race and win the lion's share of a $150,000 purse.

Smarten also won the grade three Marylander Handicap at Bowie Race Course and the grade three Woodlawn Stakes on the turf at Pimlico Race Course at age three. He had a great stretch run placing in the grade one Travers Stakes at Saratoga Race Course finishing second. Other second-place finishes in his three-year-old season were the grade two Meadowlands Cup, the grade two Arkansas Derby, the grade one Secretariat Stakes on the turf at Arlington Park, the grade three Rutgers Handicap, and two grade two stakes races at Aqueduct Racetrack in the Lawrence Realization Stakes and the Discovery Handicap. He concluded his career with a third-place finish in the Jockey Hollow Handicap at the Meadowlands Racetrack.

== Retirement ==
As a sire, Smarten notably produced Classy 'n Smart, a Canadian Horse Racing Hall of Fame inductee and dam of U.S. and Canadian Hall of Fame filly, Dance Smartly, Smart Guy, Pennsylvania Derby winner, and of the outstanding sire, Smart Strike. Smarten died March 31, 2003.
