= 1913 Kentucky Derby =

Horse race

39th Kentucky Derby
- Kentucky Derby
- Grade I stakes race
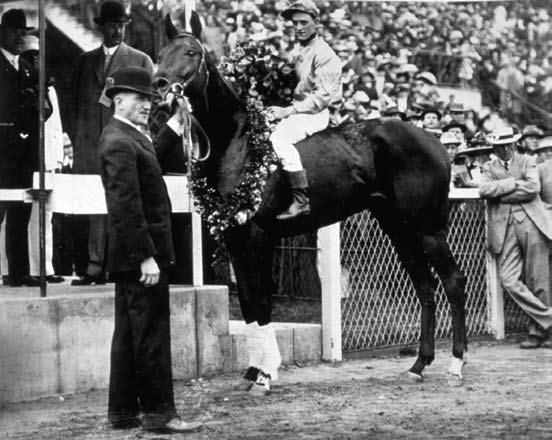
- Donerail after winning the 1913 Kentucky Derby
- Location: Churchill Downs
- Date: May 10, 1913
- Winning horse: Donerail
- Jockey: Roscoe Goose
- Trainer: Thomas P. Hayes
- Owner: Thomas P. Hayes
- Surface: Dirt

The 1913 Kentucky Derby was the 39th running of the Kentucky Derby. The race took place on May 10, 1913. The winning time of 2.04.80 set a new Derby record. With odds of 91–1, winning horse Donerail is the longest odds winner in Kentucky Derby history.

== Full results ==
Finished	Post	Horse	Jockey	Trainer	Owner	Time / behind
1st	5	Donerail	Roscoe Goose	Thomas P. Hayes	Thomas P. Hayes	2:04.80
2nd	4	Ten Point	Merritt C. Buxton	Calvin Banks	Anthony L. Aste	1/2
3rd	3	Gowell	John McCabe	John T. Weaver	John T. Weaver	1 1/2
4th	8	Foundation	Johnny Loftus	William L. McDaniel	C. W. McKenna	Head
5th	6	Yankee Notions	Buddy Glass	William H. Karrick	Harry K. Knapp	Neck
6th	1	Lord Marshall	T. Steele	J. Oliver Keene	J. Oliver & G. Hamilton Keene	5
7th	2	Jimmie Gill	Charles Borel	Shelby West	L. P. Doerhoefer & Shelby West	8
8th	7	Leochares	Charles Peak	John F. Schorr	John W. Schorr	15

- Winning Breeder: Thomas P. Hayes; (KY)
- Horses Prince Hermis, Sam Hirsch, Flying Tom, and Floral Park scratched before the race.

== Payout ==
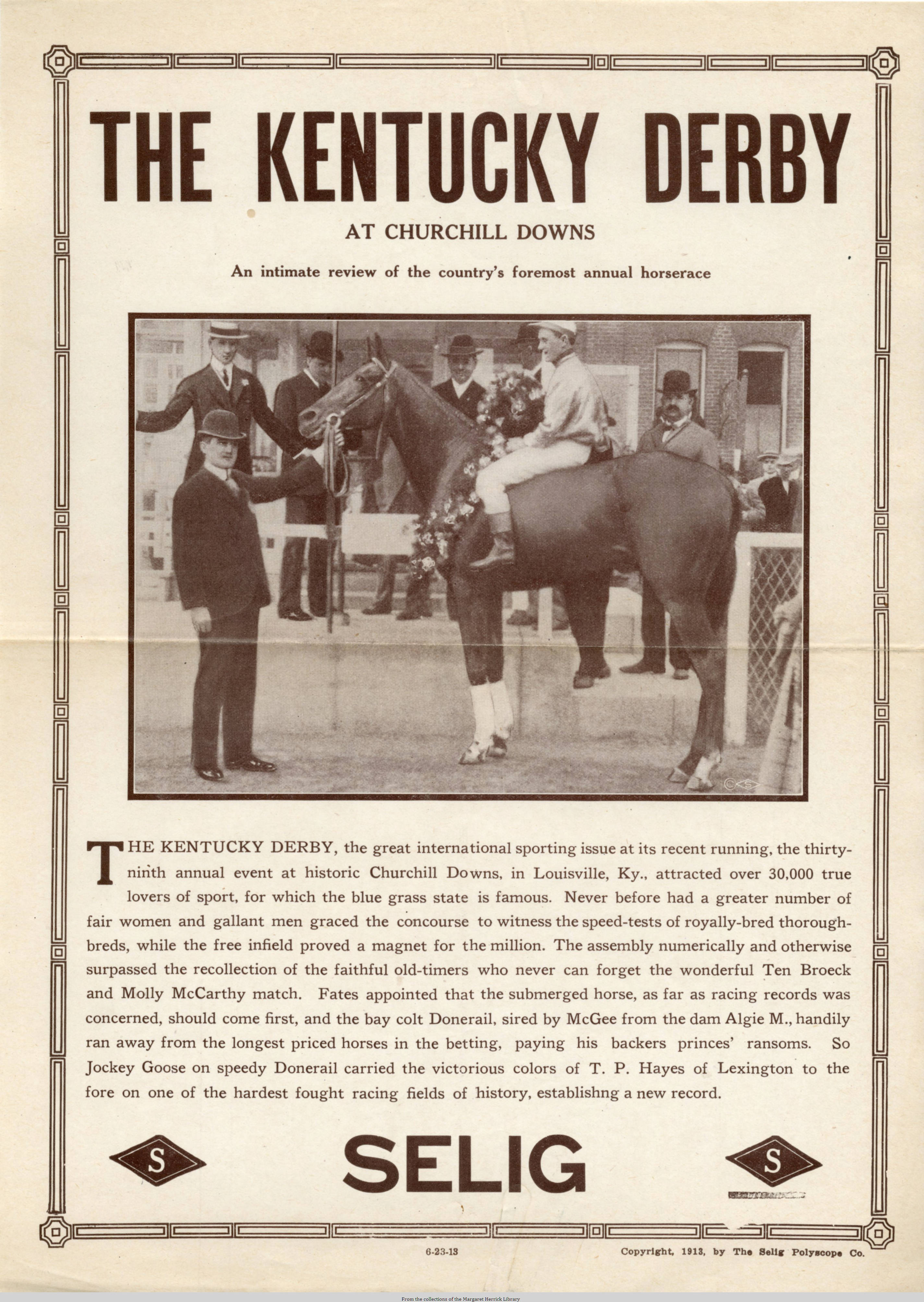
Promotional flyer for the Selig Polyscope Company's documentary, The Kentucky Derby at Churchill Downs (1913)

Post	Horse	Win	Place	Show
5	Donerail	$ 184.90	41.20	13.20
4	Ten Point		3.50	3.30
3	Gowell			14.10

- The winner received a purse of $5,475.
- Second place received $700.
- Third place received $300.

The 39th "Run for the Roses" still holds the record for the winner having the highest odds. In a small field of only eight horse Donerail entered the race at 91–1.

== Donerail ==
In 1913, Donerail set a record that still stands today. Owned by Thomas P. Hayes, the thoroughbred entered the Kentucky Derby at 91-1 odds. In fact, Hayes was not convinced that he should enter the horse at all. In a field of only eight horses, the money favorite Ten Point had the best starting position at number four. Donerail started at post five, but passed Ten Point and won by only half a length. Donerail's win was especially remarkable when one considers the economic living standards in 1913. The average household income at the time was about $3,000. The United States was largely made up of farming communities. In today's economy, a $10 bet on Donerail paid out nearly $26,031. The horse would go on to be on the leaderboard in half of his lifetime races. After his record-making win in the Kentucky Derby, Donerail continued to race until 1916, when he was retired to Glen-Helen Farm.

== Thomas P. Hayes ==
Donerail was bred by Thomas P. Hayes, who decided to keep the colt. Hayes chose the thoroughbred's name after a small community near Lexington. Trained by his owner, Donerail's first races were less than impressive, and Hayes had no confidence that he was able to perform well in the Kentucky Derby. He told Roscoe Goose, the jockey, to find another mount. Goose continued to beg Hayes to enter Donerail in the Kentucky Derby, and when a friend of Hayes, William J. Treacy paid the entry fee, Donerail was added to the field. The win of Donerail also put Hayes in the history books: it was only the second time in history that the same person bred, trained, and owned the Kentucky Derby winner.

== Roscoe Goose ==
Donerail's jockey Roscoe Goose was a descendant of one of the pioneer families in the Louisville area. He was confident of the potential of the horse and even told friends that he believed Donerail could win the Kentucky Derby. Roscoe's brother, Carl, was also a jockey and he was killed in a riding accident. Roscoe committed to teach and train young jockeys. He was instrumental in adding the requirement for the jockeys to wear helmets. Roscoe Goose became a trainer, breeder, owner, and elder statesman of horse racing. ^{[2]}He would mentor the great jockey Eddie Arcaro. In 1963, Roscoe Goose was one of the first athletes named to the Kentucky Athletic Hall of Fame. He died in 1971 and is buried in Louisville's Cave Hill Cemetery.

== Derby Day 1913 ==
May 10, 1913, was a beautiful sunny day. The newly renovated Churchill Downs was packed with 30,000 people to watch the race. Twelve horses were expected to compete, but four scratched before the race, leaving a field of only eight. In addition to his record-making odds, Donerail won the Derby with the fastest time recorded to that point. The favored horses for the race that day were Ten Point (at post four), Foundation (at post eight) and Yankee Notions (at post six).
