= Donerail =

American Thoroughbred racehorse

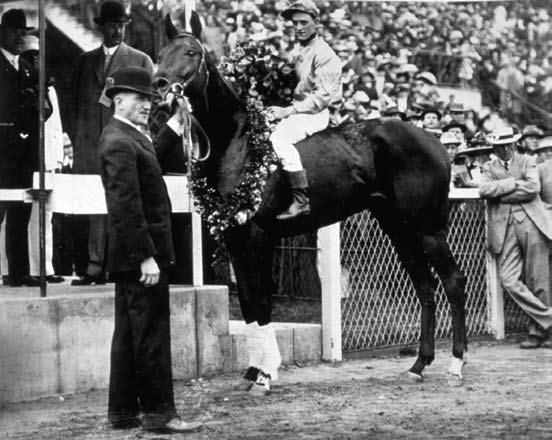
- Donerail after winning the 1913 Kentucky Derby
- Sire: McGee
- Grandsire: White Knight
- Dam: Algie M
- Damsire: Hanover
- Sex: Stallion
- Foaled: 1910
- Country: United States
- Colour: Bay
- Breeder: Thomas P. Hayes
- Owner: Thomas P. Hayes
- Trainer: Thomas P. Hayes
- Record: 62: 10-11-10
- Earnings: $15,156

Major wins
- Kentucky Derby (1913); Canadian Sportsmen's Handicap (1913); Hamilton Cup (1914)
- Last updated on 4/15/2016

Donerail (1910 – after 1918) was an American Thoroughbred racehorse that was the upset winner of the 1913 Kentucky Derby. His win stands as the biggest longshot victory in the history of the Kentucky Derby. Going off at 91–1, Donerail provided a $184.90 payoff for a $2 bet.

== Background ==
Donerail was a bay colt sired by McGee and foaled by Algie M. He was owned, bred, and trained by Thomas P. Hayes near Lexington, Kentucky. His jockey was Roscoe Goose.

=== Before the Derby ===
Due to growing popularity, Churchill Downs underwent major renovations in preparation for the Derby, the record 30,000 expected attendees and the $6,600 purse. A new era also opened in 1913 as the minimum bet was reduced to $2, making betting more affordable. As a Louisville native, Thomas Hayes was unsure about Donerail's ability to win, so he decided that the expense and potential loss would not be worth it. But jockey Roscoe Goose convinced him to race the horse.

Because of the overcrowding at the 1913 Kentucky Derby, there were not enough stables, so Donerail was housed at Douglass Park, about three miles away from Churchill Downs, and had to walk over before the start. This circumstance added to Hayes’ hesitation about the race. His direction to Goose was not to win but rather to “get a piece of the purse” by crossing the finish line.

== Career ==
In the 1913 Kentucky Derby, various horses had the lead, and for a time it was Ten Point first, Foundation in second, and Yankee Notions third. Roscoe Goose kept Donerail within striking distance. As the horses turned into the stretch, Ten Point was still ahead, but Donerail closed to gain the lead and crossed the wire half a length ahead of Ten Point. He was drawing away at the finish and set a track record with a time of 2:04 4/5. His victory was the largest upset in Kentucky Derby history, a record still held, with odds of 91–1 against him.

After the 1913 Derby, Donerail continued racing but did not find major success. Of 62 starts, he won 10, placed in 11, and showed in 10. His other major victories came in the Canadian Sportsmen's Handicap and the Hamilton Cup. His career earnings amounted to $15,156.

== Later life ==
It is not known when Donerail died, and much of what became of him after his racing career ended remains a mystery; however, he was retired in 1917 and briefly used as breeding stallion in Lexington, where he commanded a stud fee of $50. In December 1917, Hayes donated Donerail to the Remount Service for use as a sire of cavalry horses. Gelded and sold to John E. Madden, Donerail reappeared on the turf on May 27, 1918, in New York, where he was eased and dropped out of competition in a mile-long race.

== Pedigree ==
Pedigree of Donerail
Sire McGee 1900	White Knight 1895	Sir Hugo	Wisdom
Sire McGee 1900	White Knight 1895	Sir Hugo	Manoeuvre
Sire McGee 1900	White Knight 1895	Whitelock	Wenlock
Sire McGee 1900	White Knight 1895	Whitelock	White Heather
Sire McGee 1900	Remorse 1876	Hermit	Newminster
Sire McGee 1900	Remorse 1876	Hermit	Seclusion
Sire McGee 1900	Remorse 1876	Vex	Vedette
Sire McGee 1900	Remorse 1876	Vex	Flying Duchess
Dam Algie M 1898	Hanover 1884	Hindoo	Virgil
Dam Algie M 1898	Hanover 1884	Hindoo	Florence
Dam Algie M 1898	Hanover 1884	Bourbon Belle	Bonnie Scotland
Dam Algie M 1898	Hanover 1884	Bourbon Belle	Ella D
Dam Algie M 1898	Johnetta 1890	Bramble	Bonnie Scotland
Dam Algie M 1898	Johnetta 1890	Bramble	Ivy Leaf
Dam Algie M 1898	Johnetta 1890	Guildean	Ballinkeel
Dam Algie M 1898	Johnetta 1890	Guildean	Orphan Girl
