= Smoke Glacken =

American-bred Thoroughbred racehorse

- Sire: Two Punch
- Grandsire: Mr. Prospector
- Dam: Majesty's Crown
- Damsire: Magesterial
- Sex: Stallion
- Foaled: 1994
- Country: United States
- Colour: Gray
- Breeder: Perry M. Rosebrock
- Owner: William Roberts, Alexander Karkenny, Robert P. Levy
- Trainer: Henry L. Carroll
- Record: 14: 10-2-1
- Earnings: $759,560

Major wins
- Tyro Stakes (1996); Sapling Stakes (1996); Hopeful Stakes (1996); Southwest Stakes (1997); Frank J. De Francis Memorial Dash Stakes (1997); Black Gold Stakes (1997); Jersey Shore Breeders' Cup Stakes (1997); Riva Ridge Stakes (1997)

Awards
- American Champion Sprint Horse (1997)
- Last updated on February 12, 2010

Smoke Glacken (foaled 1994 – April 21, 2016) was an American Champion Thoroughbred racehorse. Sired by Two Punch, a son of the important sire Mr. Prospector, his dam was Majesty's Crown, a daughter of Irish stakes winner Magisterial, who was a son of Northern Dancer.

Trained by Henry Carroll, at age two, Smoke Glacken finished second in his racing debut, then won four straight, including the Tyro Stakes and the Grade II Sapling Stakes, both at Monmouth Park Racetrack. His most important win of 1996 was the Grade I Hopeful Stakes at Saratoga Race Course, which he won by nine lengths. He finished his two-year-old season with $284,500 in earnings.

A sprint horse best at distances of a mile or less, in his three-year-old season Smoke Glacken won six of his eight races and finished second and third in his other two starts. He won the Grade II Frank J. De Francis Memorial Dash Stakes at Laurel Park, the Grade III Riva Ridge Stakes at Belmont Park, the Grade III Southwest Stakes at Oaklawn Park by eight lengths, the Grade III Jersey Shore Breeders' Cup Stakes, the Mountain Valley Stakes, and the Black Gold Stakes. He was second in the Grade II Lexington Stakes at Keeneland to Touch Gold and third in the Grade III Louisiana Derby to Crypto Star and Half Watch by a half-length. He finished his three-year-old season with $475,060 in earnings.

In addition, his 1997 performances earned him that year's Eclipse Award for American Champion Sprint Horse.

== Offspring ==
Smoke Glacken entered stud in 1998 at Gainesway Farm in Lexington, Kentucky. For the 2010 breeding season, his stud fee was $12,500.

Smoke Glacken's descendants include:

c = colt, f = filly

Foaled	Name	Sex	Major Wins
1999	Smok'n Frolic	f	Next Move Handicap, Kentucky Cup Distaff Stakes, Cotillion Handicap, Demoiselle Stakes, Tempted Stakes, Fashion Stakes
1999	Gazillion	c	Squan Song Stakes, Conniver Stakes
2001	Read the Footnotes	c	Fountain of Youth Stakes, Remsen Stakes, Nashua Stakes
2005	Irish Smoke	c	Spinaway Stakes
2005	Smokey Fire	c	Highlander Stakes, Play the King Stakes, Kennedy Road Stakes, Bold Venture Stakes
2006	Frolic's Dream	f	Forward Gal Stakes
2006	Persistently	f	Personal Ensign Stakes
2007	Delaunay	c	Churchill Downs Stakes, Aristides Stakes
2008	Quantum Miss	c	Cicada Stakes
2009	On Fire Baby	f	La Troienne Stakes, Apple Blossom Handicap, Honeybee Stakes, Golden Rod Stakes, Pocahontas Stakes
2012	Justalittlesmoke	c	Diana Stakes
