= Henry L. Carroll =

American horse trainer

Personal information
- Born: December 15, 1947 (age 78) Orangeburg, South Carolina
- Occupation: Trainer

Horse racing career
- Sport: Horse racing

Major racing wins
- Stuyvesant Handicap (1984); Salvator Mile Handicap (1985); Laurel Turf Cup Stakes (1987); Appleton Handicap (1988); Elkhorn Stakes (1988); King Edward Stakes (1988); Fort Harrod Stakes (1989); Turf Classic Handicap (1989); Man o' War Stakes (1989); Oceanport Stakes (1989); United Nations Stakes (1989); Pucker Up Stakes (1990); Red Smith Handicap (1990); Violet Handicap (1991); Tyro Stakes (1996); Sapling Stakes (1996); Hopeful Stakes (1996); Black Gold Stakes (1997); Southwest Stakes (1997); Frank J. De Francis Memorial Dash Stakes (1997); Jersey Shore Breeders' Cup Stakes (1997); Riva Ridge Stakes (1997); Point Given Stakes (2003)

Significant horses
- Valiant Lark, Smoke Glacken, Yankee Affair

Henry L. Carroll (born December 15, 1947, in Orangeburg, South Carolina) was the son of Bill Carroll, who trained horses at New England racetracks. Carroll holds a degree in history from Newberry College. Having ties to thoroughbred horses through his own father and eager to get back into the world of racing, Carroll obtained his racing license in 1972. He has been breaking and training horses ever since.

Carroll has raced horses all over the country, including at Monmouth Park Racetrack, Belmont Park, Saratoga Race Course, Gulfstream Park, Keeneland, and Fair Grounds Race Course, to name a few. In recent years he has primarily raced from a base at Monmouth Park Racetrack in Oceanport, New Jersey.

Carroll is the trainer of several top thoroughbred horses, including:

- Valiant Lark, winner of $498,497in his lifetime. Most notable races were the 1984 Stuyvesant Handicap at Aqueduct Racetrack, the 1984 New Hampshire Sweepstakes at Rockingham Park and the 1985 Salvator Mile Handicap at Monmouth Park Racetrack.
- Yankee Affair, who earned $2.3 million in his lifetime of racing. His most notable wins were the Man O' War Stakes and the Turf Classic Handicap both at Belmont Park in 1989.
- Smoke Glacken, an American Champion Thoroughbred racehorse and sprinter. His achievements in 1997 earned him the Eclipse Award for American Champion Sprint Horse.

With his wife Patricia, Henry Carroll owns and operates Lafayette Farm in St. Matthews, South Carolina, where they offer horse boarding, breaking and training, layups, and broodmares/foaling.
