= Decathlon (horse) =

American-bred Thoroughbred racehorse

- Sire: Olympia
- Grandsire: Heliopolis
- Dam: Dog Blessed
- Damsire: Bull Dog
- Sex: Stallion
- Foaled: 1953
- Country: United States
- Colour: Bay
- Owner: River Divide Farm (Robert J. Dienst)
- Trainer: Rollie T. Shepp
- Rider: Bill Hartack
- Record: 42: 25-8-1
- Earnings: US$269,530.

Major wins
- Bay State Kindergarten Stakes (1955); Narragansett Nursery Stakes (1955); De Soto Handicap (1955); Dade County Handicap (1955); Tyro Stakes (1955); Coral Gables Handicap (1956); Hibiscus Stakes (1956); Hutcheson Stakes (1956); Inaugural Handicap (1956); Oceanport Handicap (1956, 1957); Select Handicap (1956); New Year's Handicap (1957); Hialeah Inaugural Handicap (1957); John Alden Handicap (1957); Longport Handicap (1957); Princeton Handicap (1957); Rumson Handicap (1957)

Awards
- American Champion Sprint Horse (1956, 1957)

Honours
- U.S. Racing Hall of Fame (2025)

Decathlon (1953–1972) was an American Thoroughbred racehorse who was voted the U.S. Champion Sprint Horse in 1956 and 1957. He was sired by Olympia, the Leading broodmare sire in North America in 1974. His dam was Dog Blessed, a daughter of Bull Dog, the 1943 Leading sire in North America.

Decathlon was purchased for $15,500 at a 1954 Kentucky yearling sale by Robert J. Dienst, president of Beulah Park Racetrack in Columbus, Ohio. Decathlon was trained by Rollie Shepp. Because of his awkward side-wheeling stride, Shepp and owner Dienst decided his running style might exhaust the colt over longer distances and early in his racing career began limiting him to sprint races.

In October 1957, Robert J. Dienst announced that Decathlon would be retired to stud in Kentucky for the 1958 season. The horse finished his racing career with a record of 25-8-1 from 42 starts with earnings of US$269,530.
