= Doubledogdare Stakes =

- Class: Grade II
- Location: Keeneland Race Course; Lexington, Kentucky, United States
- Inaugurated: 1992
- Race type: Thoroughbred – Flat racing
- Sponsor: Baird (since 2011)
- Website: www.keeneland.com/default.aspx

Race information
- Distance: 1 1/16 miles
- Surface: dirt
- Track: left-handed
- Qualification: Fillies and Mares, four-years-old and older
- Weight: 123 lbs with allowances
- Purse: US$400,000 (since 2026)

The Doubledogdare Stakes is a Grade II American Thoroughbred horse race for fillies and mares that are four years old or older, over a distance of a mile and a sixteenth on the dirt held annually in April at Keeneland Race Course in Lexington, Kentucky. The event currently carries a purse of $400,000.

== History ==
The race was named for Doubledogdare, the filly who gave Claiborne Farm their first major stakes win at Keeneland in the 1955 Alcibiades Stakes. Doubledogdare went on to be voted that year's American Co-Champion Two-Year-Old Filly and returned to Keeneland in 1956 to win the Spinster Stakes and would earn American Champion Three-Year-Old Filly honors.

The inaugural running of the event was on 28 October 1992 as a seven furlong event with Jeano the second favorite defeating the favorite Erica's Dream winning by a nose in a time of 1:22.61. Jeano was victorious once again in 1994 to become the races only two-time winner.

In 1995 the event was not scheduled and in 1996 the event was to be held during the Spring meeting but was cancelled after it failed to draw enough entries.

In 1997 the event was scheduled again for the spring meeting held in April, but was run on turf at a distance of five and a half furlongs. The winner Singing Heart set a new Keeneland course record of 1:02.40.

The following year the event was moved back to the dirt track and was run over a distance of mile and a sixteenth.

The 1999 U.S. Champion Three-Year-Old Filly Silverbulletday began her four-year-old campaign in this event. The event attracted only five entrants with two scratching before the start of the race. Silverbulletday started an overwhelming 3-10 odds-on favorite in the three horse race narrowly defeating Roza Robata by a neck.

In 2007 the event was upgraded to Grade III status and that year the event was run on the synthetic Polytrack surface. In 2015 Keeneland reverted to a dirt surface.

The event was not held 2020 during Keeneland's spring meeting which was moved to July and shortened due to the COVID-19 pandemic in the United States.

In 2026 the Thoroughbred Owners and Breeders Association upgraded the event to Grade II status.

== Records ==
Speed record:

- 1 1/16 miles – 1:41.20 Lu Ravi (1999)

Margins

- 12 lengths – Pool Land (2006)

Most wins

- 2 – Jeano (1992, 1994)

Most wins by a jockey

- 6 – John R. Velazquez (2005, 2006, 2011, 2015, 2017, 2022)

Most wins by a trainer

- 5 – Todd A. Pletcher (2005, 2006, 2011, 2017, 2022)

Most wins by an owner

- 2 – Frances A. Genter (1992, 1994)
- 2 – Sam-Son Farm (2002, 2015)
- 2 – Stonestreet Stables (2018, 2019)

== Winners ==
| Year | Winner | Age | Jockey | Trainer | Owner | Distance | Time | Purse | Grade | Ref |
|---|---|---|---|---|---|---|---|---|---|---|
| 2026 | Alpine Princess | 5 | Irad Ortiz Jr. | Brad H. Cox | Full of Run Racing II & Madaket Stables | 1 1/16 miles | 1:44.09 | $400,000 | II | |
| 2025 | Gin Gin | 4 | Jose L. Ortiz | Brendan P. Walsh | Calumet Farm | 1 1/16 miles | 1:45.15 | $350,000 | III | |
| 2024 | Raging Sea | 4 | Flavien Prat | Chad C. Brown | Alpha Delta Stables | 1 1/16 miles | 1:44.24 | $300,000 | III | |
| 2023 | Frost Point | 5 | Flavien Prat | William I. Mott | Godolphin | 1 1/16 miles | 1:43.95 | $292,594 | III | |
| 2022 | Malathaat | 4 | John R. Velazquez | Todd A. Pletcher | Shadwell Racing | 1 1/16 miles | 1:44.58 | $300,000 | III | |
| 2021 | Bonny South | 4 | Florent Geroux | Brad H. Cox | Juddmonte Farm | 1 1/16 miles | 1:43.46 | $100,000 | III | |
| 2020 | Race not held | | | | | | | | | |
| 2019 | Electric Forest | 4 | Jose L. Ortiz | Chad C. Brown | Stonestreet Stables | 1 1/16 miles | 1:45.25 | $98,000 | III | |
| 2018 | Valadorna | 4 | Brian Hernandez Jr. | Mark E. Casse | Stonestreet Stables | 1 1/16 miles | 1:43.87 | $100,000 | III | |
| 2017 | Unbridled Mo | 4 | John R. Velazquez | Todd A. Pletcher | Red Oak Stable (Brunetti) | 1 1/16 miles | 1:45.11 | $100,000 | III | |
| 2016 | Brooklynsway | 4 | Robby Albarado | Bernard S. Flint | Naveed Chowhan | 1 1/16 miles | 1:42.86 | $100,000 | III | |
| 2015 | Deceptive Vision | 5 | John R. Velazquez | Malcolm Pierce | Sam-Son Farm | 1 1/16 miles | 1:44.34 | $100,000 | III | |
| 2014 | Sisterly Love | 6 | Stewart Elliott | Mark E. Casse | Gary Barber | 1 1/16 miles | 1:43.82 | $100,000 | III | |
| 2013 | Ice Cream Silence | 4 | Rosie Napravnik | George R. Arnold II | G. Watts Humphrey Jr. | 1 1/16 miles | 1:44.66 | $100,000 | III | |
| 2012 | Pachattack | 6 | Rajiv Maragh | H. Graham Motion | Flaxman Holdings | 1 1/16 miles | 1:43.75 | $100,000 | III | |
| 2011 | Embur's Song | 4 | John R. Velazquez | Todd A. Pletcher | Fares Farm | 1 1/16 miles | 1:41.62 | $125,000 | III | |
| 2010 | Haka | 4 | Garrett K. Gomez | Christophe Clement | Claiborne Farm | 1 1/16 miles | 1:44.72 | $98,000 | III | |
| 2009 | Indescribable | 5 | Kent J. Desormeaux | William I. Mott | Courtlandt Farm | 1 1/16 miles | 1:42.40 | $100,000 | III | |
| 2008 | Carriage Trail | 5 | Kent J. Desormeaux | Claude R. McGaughey III | Stuart S. Janney III & Phipps Stable | 1 1/16 miles | 1:42.51 | $125,000 | III | |
| 2007 | Asi Siempre | 5 | Garrett K. Gomez | Patrick L. Biancone | Martin S. Schwartz | 1 1/16 miles | 1:46.04 | $108,600 | III | |
| 2006 | Pool Land | 4 | John R. Velazquez | Todd A. Pletcher | Melnyk Racing Stables | 1 1/16 miles | 1:44.08 | $107,300 | Listed | |
| 2005 | Colony Band | 4 | John R. Velazquez | Todd A. Pletcher | Wertheimer et Frère | 1 1/16 miles | 1:46.15 | $109,700 | Listed | |
| 2004 | Mayo On the Side | 5 | Pat Day | Carl A. Nafzger | Lothenback Stables | 1 1/16 miles | 1:43.92 | $114,300 | Listed | |
| 2003 | Reason to Talk | 4 | Pat Day | David R. Vance | Ronald L. & Tom Kirby | 1 1/16 miles | 1:45.19 | $105,439 | Listed | |
| 2002 | Dancethruthedawn | 4 | Robby Albarado | Mark R. Frostad | Sam-Son Farm | 1 1/16 miles | 1:42.92 | $107,600 | Listed | |
| 2001 | Darling My Darling | 4 | Mike E. Smith | John T. Ward Jr. | Debby M. Oxley | 1 1/16 miles | 1:44.38 | $108,500 | Listed | |
| 2000 | Silverbulletday | 4 | Jerry D. Bailey | Bob Baffert | Michael E. Pegram | 1 1/16 miles | 1:43.76 | $99,084 | Listed | |
| 1999 | Lu Ravi | 4 | Willie Martinez | Carl Bowman | Yoshio Fujita | 1 1/16 miles | 1:41.32 | $108,800 | Listed | |
| 1998 | Top Secret | 5 | Joe Bravo | George R. Arnold II | John H. Peace | 1 1/16 miles | 1:42.60 | $72,150 | Listed | |
| 1997 | Singing Heart | 5 | Craig Perret | Alice G. Cohn | Carl Icahn | 5 1/2 furlongs | 1:02.49 | $73,385 | Listed | |
| 1995–1996 | | Race not held | | | | | | | | |
| 1994 | Jeano | 6 | Shane Sellers | Carl A. Nafzger | Frances A. Genter Stable | 7 furlongs | 1:24.06 | $44,700 | | |
| 1993 | How Rare | 4 | Brent E. Bartram | Billy G. Ashabraner | Norman R. Wooten & Bryant Wells | 7 furlongs | 1:22.02 | $46,900 | | |
| 1992 | Jeano | 4 | Shane Sellers | Carl A. Nafzger | Frances A. Genter | 7 furlongs | 1:22.61 | $38,150 | | |

Legend:
All Weather Track Dirt Turf

== See also ==
- List of American and Canadian Graded races
