= Oceanport Stakes =

- Class: Grade III
- Location: Monmouth Park Racetrack; Oceanport, New Jersey, United States
- Inaugurated: 1947
- Race type: Thoroughbred - Flat racing
- Website: Monmouth Park Racetrack

Race information
- Distance: 1 1/16 miles (8.5 furlongs)
- Surface: Turf
- Track: Left-handed
- Qualification: Three-years-old & up
- Weight: Assigned
- Purse: $150,000

The Oceanport Stakes is an American Thoroughbred horse race run annually in early August at Monmouth Park Racetrack in Oceanport, New Jersey. Open to horses age three and older, the Grade III event is contested on turf over a distance of 1 1/16 miles(8.5 furlongs).

Inaugurated in 1947 as a six furlong sprint race on dirt, it was switched to the turf course in 1964.

The race was not run in 1996 due to Hurricane Bertha. It was run in two divisions in 1956, 1966–1969, 1971, 1973, 1975–1976, 1979, 1982.

== Records ==
Speed record:

- 1:38.99 - Silent Roar (2007)

== Winners since 1999 ==
Year	Winner	Age	Jockey	Trainer	Owner	Time
2025	Air Recruit	4	Paco Lopez	Arnaud Delacour	Mark B. Grier	1:42.02
2024	St Anthony	5	Joe Bravo	Neil D. Drysdale	Alice Bamford	1:41.28
2023	Highestdistinction	6	Jairo Rendon	Lindsay Schultz	Willow Lane Stables	1:43.04
2022	Kuramata (IRE)	5	Hector Diaz Jr.	Chad C. Brown	Peter M. Brant	1:40.74
2021	Raased	5	Heriberto Figueroa	Alison Escobar	Esquivel Candido	1:44.43
2020	Sacred Life (FR)	5	Paco Lopez	Chad C. Brown	Michael Dubb, Wonder Stables, Bethlehem Stables LLC, Madaket Stables LLC	1:42.13
2019	Just Howard	5	Trevor McCarthy	H. Graham Motion	Skeedattle Stable	1:42.62
2018	Synchrony	5	Joe Bravo	Michael Stidham	Pine Oak Stable	1:42.05
2017	No Race					
2016	Blacktype (FR)	5	Joe Bravo	Christophe Clement	Jump Sucker Stable	1:45.64
2015	Heart to Heart	4	Victor Espinoza	Brian A. Lynch	Terry Hamilton	1:40.79
2014	Guys Reward	7	Paco Lopez	Dale L. Romans	Michael J. Bruder	1:40.48
2013	Silver Max	4	Robby Albarado	Dale L. Romans	Bacon/Wells	1:40.02
2012	Tune Me In	5	Paco Lopez	Bruce F. Alexander	Patricia A. Generazio	1:43.39
2011	Yummy With Butter	7	Paco Lopez	Yvon Belsoeur	Bruno Schickedanz	1:40.98
2010	Get Serious	6	Pablo Fragroso	John H. Forbes	J. M. Dinan & J. J. Moo	1:40.93
2009	Get Serious	5	Pablo Fragroso	John H. Forbes	J. M. Dinan & J. J. Moo	1:43.02
2008	Silver Tree	8	Kent Desormeaux	William I. Mott	Peter Vegso	1:40.05
2007	Silent Roar	4	Stewart Elliott	Michael J. Moran	Michael J. Moran	1:38.99
2006	Three Valleys	5	Ramon Dominguez	Robert J. Frankel	Juddmonte Farms	1:40.06
2005	Ay Caramba	5	Gary Stevens	Robert J. Frankel	Patricia Bozano	1:42.53
2004	Gulch Approval	4	Pat Day	Nick Zito	Marylou Whitney	1:42.31
2003	Runspastum	6	Julian Pimentel	Alan E. Goldberg	Jayeff B Stables	1:42.31
2002	Tempest Fugit	5	Jose A. Velez, Jr.	John Servis	Dennis A. Drazin	1:42.72
2001	Key Lory	7	Chuck C. Lopez	Dennis Manning	Mac Fehsenfeld	1:40.20
2000	North East Bound	4	Jose A. Velez, Jr.	William W. Perry	J. DeMarco & R. DiSano	1:44.60
1999	Mi Narrow	5	Joe Bravo	Edwin T. Broome	Lisa Hall	1:39.40

== Earlier winners ==
- 1998 - Daylight Savings (4)
- 1997 - Boyce (6)
- 1996 - not run
- 1995 - Boyce (4)
- 1994 - Nijinksy's Gold (5)
- 1993 - Furiously (4)
- 1992 - Maxigroom (4)
- 1991 - Fiftysevenvette (4)
- 1990 - Bill E. Shears (5)
- 1989 - Yankee Affair (7)
- 1988 - Feeling Gallant (6)
- 1987 - Sovereign Song (5)
- 1986 - Salem Drive (4)
- 1985 - Cozzene (5)
- 1984 - World Appeal (4)
- 1983 - Fray Star (5)
- 1982 - McCann (4)
- 1981 - Winds of Winter (4)
- 1980 - North Course (5)
- 1979 - Revivalist (5)
- 1978 - Mr. Red Wing (4)
- 1977 - Quick Card (4)
- 1976 - Toujours Pret (7)
- 1975 - R Tom Can (4)
- 1974 - Mo Bay (5)
- 1973 - Lexington Park (7)
- 1972 - Native Heir (6)
- 1971 - Red Reality (5)
- 1970 - Mr. Leader (4)
- 1969 - Mara Lark (4)
- 1968 - Country Friend (6)
- 1967 - not run
- 1966 - not run
- 1965 - Uncle Percy (7)
- 1964 - Turbo Jet (4)
- 1963 - Accordant (3)
- 1962 - Jet's Pat (4)
- 1961 - Careless John (4)
- 1960 - Besomer (7)
- 1959 - Itobe (6)
- 1958 - True Verdict (4)
- 1957 - Decathlon
- 1956 - Duc De Fer (5)
- 1956 - Decathlon (2nd div.)
- 1955 - Dark Peter (7)
- 1954 - Master Ace (5)
- 1953 - Cinda (4)
- 1952 - General Staff (4)
- 1951 - Tuscany (3)
- 1950 - Imacomin (4)
- 1949 - Rippey (6)
- 1948 - Yankee Hill (4)
- 1947 - Polynesian (5)
