= Olympia (horse) =

American-bred Thoroughbred racehorse

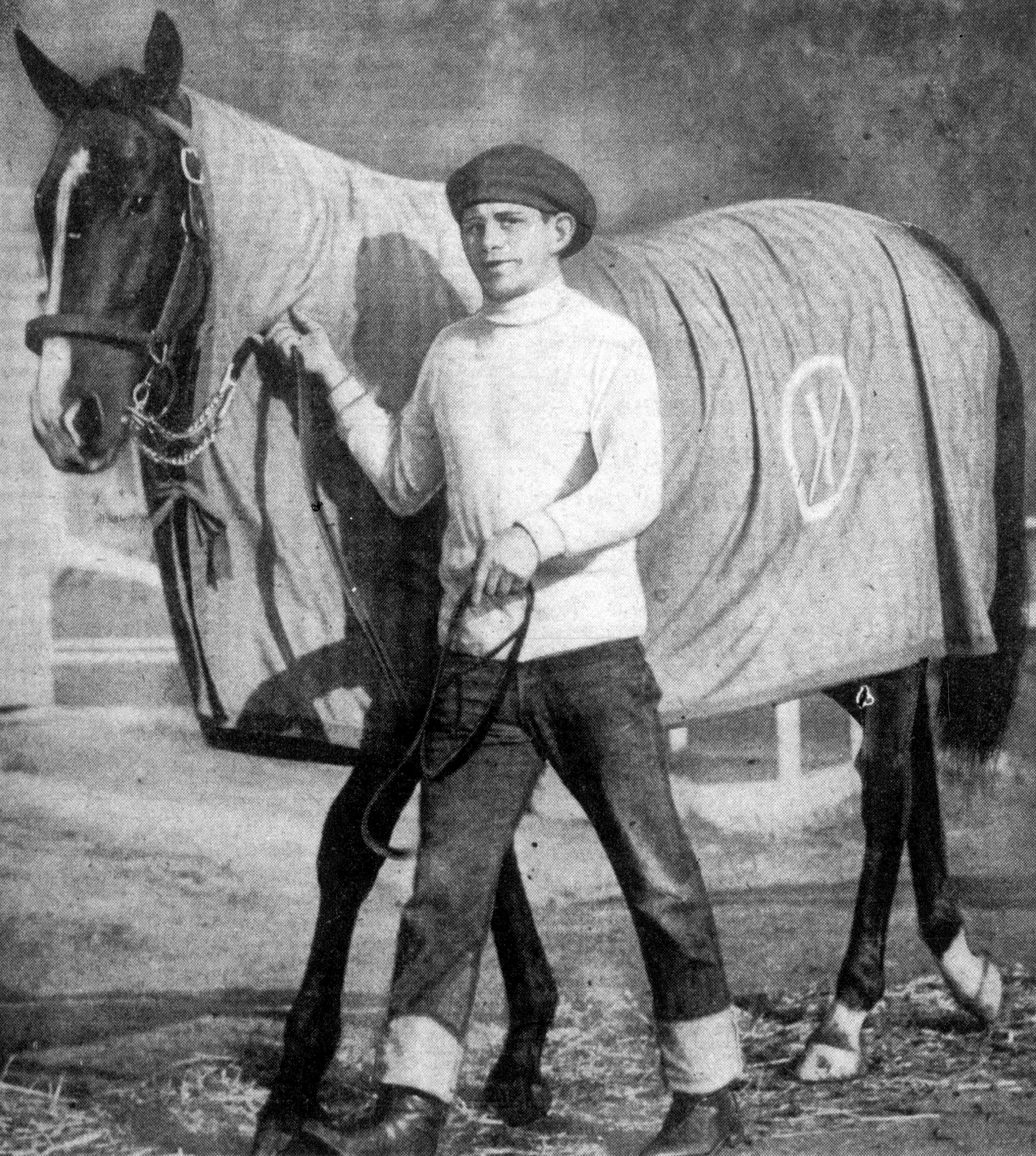
- Olympia, circa 1949
- Sire: Heliopolis
- Grandsire: Hyperion
- Dam: Miss Dolphin
- Damsire: Stimulus
- Sex: Stallion
- Foaled: 1946
- Country: United States
- Colour: Bay
- Breeder: Ivan H. Parke
- Owner: Fred W. Hooper
- Trainer: Ivan H. Parke
- Record: 41: 15-12-4
- Earnings: US$365,632

Major wins
- Breeders' Futurity Stakes (1948); Joliet Stakes (1948); Primer Stakes (1948); San Felipe Stakes (1949); Flamingo Stakes (1949); Wood Memorial Stakes (1949); Derby Trial Stakes (1949); Withers Stakes (1949); Experimental Free H. No. 2 (1949); Experimental Free H. No. 1 (1949); Paumonok Handicap (1950); Camden Handicap (1950); Roseben Handicap (1950)

Awards
- Leading broodmare sire in North America (1974)

Olympia (1946–1974) was an American Thoroughbred racehorse who won top races at age two through four then became a foundation sire for Florida breeder, Fred W. Hooper. Bred by Hall of Fame jockey turned trainer, Ivan H. Parke, he was sired by Champion sire Heliopolis and out of the mare, Miss Dolphin.

After a very successful two-year-old season, Olympia won the San Felipe Stakes, the Flamingo Stakes, the Wood Memorial Stakes and the Derby Trial Stakes that resulted in him being sent off as the heavy betting favorite for the 1949 Kentucky Derby, in which he finished sixth.

Olympia developed into a top class sprinter who retired from racing with a record of 15-12-4 in 41 starts, and earnings of $365,632.

== Champion broodmare sire ==
Olympia was retired to stud duty. He stood at Danada Farm in Lexington, Kentucky but on his death at age 28 in 1974 was buried at Hooper Farm in Ocala, Florida.

Among his successful progeny were two Eclipse Award winners. Decathlon (f. 1953) was voted the American Champion Sprint Horse in 1956 and 1957 and Pucker Up (foaled in 1953) the 1957 American Champion Older Female Horse. Olympia's other good runners included:

- Air Pilot (foaled in 1954), two-time winner of the Massachusetts Handicap
- Alhambra (foaled in 1955), multiple stakes winner
- Talent Show (foaled in 1955), multiple stakes winner who earned more than US$500,000
- Winonly (foaled in 1957), multiple stakes winner
- Editorialist (foaled in 1958), multiple stakes winner
- Top Bid (foaled in 1964). the 1973 American Grand National winner, 1970 American Champion Steeplechase Horse
- My Portrait (foaled in 1958), won 1961 Kentucky Oaks

Olympia was the damsire of Darby Dan Farm's a runner True Knight (foaled in 1969) who was instrumental in Olympia becoming the 1974 Leading broodmare sire in North America.

== Sire line tree ==
- Olympia
  - Decathlon
    - Western Warrior
  - Air Pilot
  - Greek Game
  - Lucky Mel
  - Alhambra
  - Talent Show
  - Winonly
  - Editorialist
  - Pia Star
    - Poley
  - Creme dela Creme
    - Cafe Prince
    - Rich Cream
      - Creme Fraiche
  - Top Bid
