= Tyro Stakes =

- Class: Ungraded stakes
- Location: Monmouth Park Racetrack; Oceanport, New Jersey, United States
- Inaugurated: 1886
- Race type: Thoroughbred – Flat racing

Race information
- Distance: 5 furlongs (0.63 mi)
- Surface: Turf
- Track: Left-handed
- Qualification: Two years old
- Purse: US$75,000

The Tyro Stakes is an American Thoroughbred horse race run annually in July at Monmouth Park Racetrack in Oceanport, New Jersey. A non-graded stakes race offering a current purse of $60,000, it is open to two-year-old horses weighted at 122 pounds with allowances. It was a run on a dirt track from inception until 2012 when it became a race on turf. It is currently contested at a distance of five furlongs.

In 1886, this race was won by Tremont, the United States Champion Two-Year-Old Male. Tremont won every one of his 13 races during a period of 10 weeks but refused to train at the age of three. The great California filly, Los Angeles, won this race in 1887.

Most wins by a jockey:

- 6 – Paco Lopez: (2013, 2014, 2021, 2023, 2024, 2025)

Most wins by a trainer:

- 4 –Steve Asmussen: (2005, 2007, 2011, 2020)
- 4 – Wesley Ward: (2012, 2017, 2019, 2021)

Most wins by an owner:

- 3 – New Farm: (1993, 1998, 2010)

== Winners since 1989 ==
Year	Winner	Age	Jockey	Trainer	Owner	Dist. (Furlongs)	Time<be>
2025	Hey Nay Nay	2	Paco Lopez	John W. Sadler	Hronis Racing LLC, Iapetus Racing LLC	5 F (T)	0:56.87
2024	Governor Sam	2	Paco Lopez	George Weaver	Bregman Family Racing	5 F (T)	0:56.15
2023	No Nay Mets	2	Paco Lopez	George Weaver	Bregman Family Racing	5 F (T)	0:57.91
2022	Sharp Aza Tack	2	Jairo Rendon	Doug O'Neill	R3 Racing LLC	5 F (T)	0:55.71
2021	Her World	2	Paco Lopez	Wesley Ward	Andrew Farm, Susan Molton, For The People Racing Stable LLC, and Windmill Manor Farm	5 F (T)	0:56.62
2020	County Final	2	Joe Bravo	Steve Asmussen	West Point Thoroughbreds, William Sandbrook, Shannon Sandbrook, and Anna Marie	5 F (D)	0:58.16
2019	Karak	2	Nik Juarez	Wesley Ward	Breeze Easy LLC	5 F (T)	0:57.08
2018	Mooji Moo Jr	2	Jairo Rendon	Patrick B. McBurney	Robert Deckert Jr.	5 F (D) *	0:58.39
2017	Hemp Hemp Hurray	2	Albin Jimenez	Wesley Ward	Kenneth and Sarah Ramsey	5.5 F (T)	1:04.91
2016	Race not held						
2015	Expected Ruler	2	Wilmer A. Garcia	Liam Daniel Benson	Liam F. Benson	5 F (T)	0:56.84
2014	Souper Colossal	2	Paco Lopez	Edward Plesa Jr.	Live Oak Plantation	5 F (T)	0:57.75
2013	Yes I'm Lucky	2	Paco Lopez	Edward Plesa Jr.	Trilogy Stable/Plesa	5 F (T)	0:56.93
2012	Rip Roarin Richie	2	Elvis Trujillo	Wesley Ward	Richard M. Ravin	5 F (T)	0:56.46
2011	She Digs Me	2	Elvis Trujillo	Steve Asmussen	J. Kirk & Judy Robison	5.5 F (D)	1:03.95
2010	Vengeful Wildcat	2	Carlos H. Marquez Jr.	Ben Perkins Jr.	New Farm (Everett & Nancy Novak)	5.5 F (D)	1:04.59
2009	Phils Prospect	2	Tony Maragh	Gary Capuano	Non Stop Stable (Gary Capuano)	5.5 F (D)	1:04.13
2008	Fellow Crasher	2	Joe Bravo	Anthony W. Dutrow	Michael Dubb, Stuart Grant & Samuel Bayard	5.5 F (D)	1:03.32
2007	Lantana Mob	2	Stewart Elliott	Steve Asmussen	Vinery Stables	5.5 F (D)	1:03.83
2006	Bella Shambrock	2	Chris DeCarlo	Todd Pletcher	J and J Stables (John Williams Jr.)	5.5 F (D)	1:04.44
2005	He's Got Grit	2	Aaron Gryder	Steve Asmussen	Curtis C. Green	5.5 F (D)	1:03.97
2004	Park Avenue Ball	2	Dale Beckner	James T. Ryerson	Char-Mari Stable (Charles & Marianne Hesse)	5.5 F (D)	1:05.02
2003	Deputy Storm	2	Joe Bravo	Todd Pletcher	James C. Spence	5.5 F (D)	1:03.73
2002	Farno	2	Tommy Turner	Frank Generazio Jr.	Patricia A. Generazio	5.5 F (D)	1:05.01
2001	Pure Precision	2	José Vélez Jr.	John J. Tammaro III	Kinsman Stable	5.5 F (D)	1:05.12
2000	Waltz King	2	Dale Beckner	John F. Mazza	Holly Crest Farm (Vincent Annarella)	5.5 F (D)	1:04.02
1999	Outrigger	2	Jerry Bailey	D. Wayne Lukas	Grousemont Farm (Theiline P. Scheumann)	5.5 F (D)	1:03.93
1998	Delaware Township	2	Abdiel Toribio	Benjamin W. Perkins Sr.	New Farm (Everett & Nancy Novak)	5.5 F (D)	1:03.93
1997	Unreal Madness	2	Herb McCauley	Edward T. Allard	Gilbert G. Campbell	5.5 F (D)	1:04.61
1996	Smoke Glacken	2	Craig Perret	Henry L. Carroll	William Roberts, Alexander Karkenny, Robert P. Levy	5.5 F (D)	1:04.60
1995	Foolish Pole	2	Herb McCauley	Virgil W. Raines	Anderson Fowler	5.5 F (D)	1:05.62
1994	Enlighten	2	Cesar Torres	William W. Perry	Daffodil Hill Farm	5.5 F (D)	1:05.22
1993	Sacred Honour	2	Carlos Lopez Sr.	Benjamin W. Perkins Jr.	New Farm	5.5 F (D)	1:05.60
1992	Wild Zone	2	Rick Wilson	Benjamin W. Perkins Jr.	Mrs. Augustus Riggs	5.5 F (D)	1:04.60
1991	Thanks to Randy	2	Joe Bravo	William D. Anderson	P. M. S. Stable	5.5 F (D)	1:03.82
1990-1	Alaskan Frost	2	Ángel Cordero Jr.	Joseph H. Pierce Jr.	Two Sisters Stable	5.5 F (D)	1:04.60
1990-2	Friendly Lover	2	Dean A. Sarvis	Joseph H. Pierce Jr.	Pastime Stable (G. Watts Humphrey Jr., et al.)	5.5 F (D)	1:05.80
1989	Dawn Quixote	2	Ruben Hernandez	Sonny Hine	Scott C. Savin	5.5 F (D)	1:03.80

- 2018: off turf
