= Matt Dinerman =

Matt Dinerman (born July 13, 1992) is an American Thoroughbred horse racing announcer and media personality who currently calls races at Oaklawn Park and Monmouth Park Racetrack.

== Early life ==
Dinerman was born and raised in San Diego, California, and grew up attending the races at Del Mar Racetrack near his parents' home. While in high school, Dinerman worked for California-based trainer John W. Sadler as a stablehand, and later was employed as part of the Del Mar Publicity Team. Dinerman graduated from Chapman University college in Orange County, California with a Bachelor's Degree in Communication Studies.

== Career ==
In 2015, Dinerman was hired as the track announcer at Emerald Downs, becoming the youngest announcer in the United States at the time. His first live race call came during an audition at Emerald in May of that year. At the time of the hiring, Dinerman became just the second track announcer in Emerald Downs's 19-year history.

Two years later in 2017, Dinerman was hired as track announcer and television racing analyst at Golden Gate Fields in Berkeley, California. He remained in that role for six years.

In the fall of 2023, Dinerman was hired as the track announcer at Oaklawn Park in Hot Springs, Arkansas. While announcing at Oaklawn in the spring of 2024, it was announced that Dinerman had been selected as the next track announcer at Monmouth Park Racetrack in Oceanport, New Jersey. Currently, Dinerman spends the winter and spring racing seasons at Oaklawn and the summers at Monmouth.

Dinerman has appeared on and also written for various horse news media outlets, including The Daily Racing Form, The Blood-Horse, TVG Network, TVG2, The San Diego Union Tribune and The Washington Times.
