= Raging Sea =

American-bred Thoroughbred racehorse

- Sire: Curlin
- Grandsire: Smart Strike
- Dam: Stormy Welcome
- Damsire: Storm Cat
- Sex: Mare
- Foaled: 18 March 2020
- Country: United States
- Color: Chestnut
- Breeder: Alpha Delta Stables
- Owner: Alpha Delta Stables
- Trainer: Chad C. Brown
- Record: 16: 8 – 2 – 3
- Earnings: $2,229,318

Major wins
- Comely Stakes (2023); Doubledogdare Stakes (2024); Shuvee Stakes (2024); Personal Ensign Stakes (2024); Beldame Stakes (2024); La Troienne Stakes (2025)
- Last updated on July 19, 2025

Raging Sea (foaled March 18, 2020) is a multiple Grade I winning American thoroughbred racehorse who won the Personal Ensign Stakes at Saratoga Race Course in 2024 and the La Troienne Stakes at Churchill Downs in 2025.

== Background ==
Raging Sea is a chestnut mare that was bred in Kentucky by Jon Clay's Alpha Delta Stables. Alpha Delta Stables continues to own the mare. Her sire is Curlin, the 2007 and 2008 American Horse of the Year and stands at Hill 'n' Dale Farms in Kentucky. Her dam is Stormy Welcome, an unraced daughter of Storm Cat who had 9 named foals of which 8 were winners. Raging Sea's 2nd dam Welcome Surprise won the 2000 Grade III Dogwood Stakes at Churchill Downs. Raging Sea's 3rd dam Weekend Surprise was dam of 1992 American Horse of the Year A.P. Indy and 1990 Preakness Stakes winner Summer Squall and Kentucky Broodmare of the Year in 1992.

Raging Sea is trained by Chad C. Brown.

== Career highlights ==
As a three-year-old on November 25, 2023, Raging Sea won her first graded event at Aqueduct, the Grade III Comely Stakes.

As a four-year-old on August 23, 2024, Raging Sea defeated the 2023 Champion Older Dirt Female Horse Idiomatic by a head in a major upset in the Grade I Personal Ensign Stakes at Saratoga Race Course.

In the Breeders' Cup Distaff at Del Mar, Raging Sea was gallant in defeat to the 2024 American Horse of the Year Thorpedo Anna.

Raging Sea started her five-year-old season with a victory in the Grade I La Troienne Stakes at Churchill Downs, defeating Thorpedo Anna.

== Statistics ==
Date	Distance	Race	Grade	Track	Odds	Field	Finish	Winning Time	Winning (Losing) Margin	Jockey	Ref
2022 – Two-year-old season
Aug 7, 2022	7 furlongs	Maiden Special Weight		Saratoga	6.90	10	1	1:25.36	neck	Flavien Prat	
Oct 7, 2022	1 1/16 miles	Alcibiades Stakes	I	Keeneland	6.52	14	4 (Note: Raging Sea finished third in the event but was disqualified and placed fourth after bumping Xigera in the straight.)	1:45.17	(neck)	Jose Ortiz	
Nov 4, 2022	1 1/16 miles	Breeders' Cup Juvenile Fillies	I	Keeneland	6.71	13	3	1:44.90	(4 lengths)	Flavien Prat	
2023 – Three-year-old season
Aug 9, 2023	1 mile	Allowance Optional Claiming		Saratoga	1.75	7	4	1:38.79	(1 3/4 lengths)	Flavien Prat	
Sep 4, 2023	1 1/8 miles	Allowance Optional Claiming		Saratoga	2.70	8	2	1:50.39	(1 3/4 lengths)	Flavien Prat	
Oct 20, 2023	1 1/8 miles	Allowance		Keeneland	0.78*	9	1	1:51.20	3 1/4 lengths	Flavien Prat	
Nov 25, 2023	1 1/8 miles	Comely Stakes	III	Aqueduct	2.15	6	1	1:50.86	nose	Manuel Franco	
2024 – Four-year-old season
Apr 19, 2024	1 1/16 miles	Doubledogdare Stakes	III	Keeneland	2.79	7	1	1:44.24	3 1/4 lengths	Flavien Prat	
Jun 8, 2024	1 1/8 miles	Ogden Phipps Stakes	I	Saratoga	4.80	6	4	1:49.58	(head)	Flavien Prat	
Jul 21, 2024	1 1/8 miles	Shuvee Stakes	II	Saratoga	1.65	5	1	1:51.95	2 1/2 lengths	Flavien Prat	
Aug 23, 2024	1 1/8 miles	Personal Ensign Stakes	I	Saratoga	6.20	5	1	1:49.14	head	Flavien Prat	
Oct 6, 2024	1 1/8 miles	Beldame Stakes	II	Aqueduct	0.10*	6	1	1:50.41	head	Flavien Prat	
Nov 2, 2024	1 1/8 miles	Breeders' Cup Distaff	I	Del Mar	4.10	10	2	1:49.10	(2 1/2 lengths)	Flavien Prat	
2025 – Five-year-old season
May 2, 2025	1 1/16 miles	La Troienne Stakes	I	Churchill Downs	4.04	7	1	1:42.91	3/4 length	Flavien Prat	
Jun 6, 2024	1 1/8 miles	Ogden Phipps Stakes	I	Saratoga	1.10*	6	3	1:49.10	(6 1/2 lengths)	Flavien Prat	
Jul 18, 2024	1 1/8 miles	Shuvee Stakes	II	Saratoga	0.65*	7	3	1:50.77	(13 1/2 lengths)	Flavien Prat	

Notes:
An (*) asterisk after the odds means Raging Sea was the post-time favorite.

== Pedigree ==
Pedigree of Raging Sea, chestnut mare, March 18, 2020
Sire Curlin (2004)	Smart Strike (CAN) (1992)	Mr. Prospector (1970)	Raise A Native (1961)
Sire Curlin (2004)	Smart Strike (CAN) (1992)	Mr. Prospector (1970)	Gold Digger (1962)
Sire Curlin (2004)	Smart Strike (CAN) (1992)	Classy 'n Smart (1981)	Smarten (1976)
Sire Curlin (2004)	Smart Strike (CAN) (1992)	Classy 'n Smart (1981)	No Class (CAN) (1974)
Sire Curlin (2004)	Sherriff's Deputy (1994)	Deputy Minister (CAN) (1979)	Vice Regent (CAN) (1967)
Sire Curlin (2004)	Sherriff's Deputy (1994)	Deputy Minister (CAN) (1979)	Mint Copy (CAN) (1970)
Sire Curlin (2004)	Sherriff's Deputy (1994)	Barbarika (1985)	Bates Motel (1979)
Sire Curlin (2004)	Sherriff's Deputy (1994)	Barbarika (1985)	War Exchange(1972)
Dam Stormy Welcome (2006)	Storm Cat (1983)	Storm Bird (CAN) (1978)	Northern Dancer (CAN) (1961)
Dam Stormy Welcome (2006)	Storm Cat (1983)	Storm Bird (CAN) (1978)	South Ocean (CAN) (1967)
Dam Stormy Welcome (2006)	Storm Cat (1983)	Terlingua (1976)	Secretariat (1970)
Dam Stormy Welcome (2006)	Storm Cat (1983)	Terlingua (1976)	Crimson Saint (1969)
Dam Stormy Welcome (2006)	Welcome Surprise (1997)	Seeking the Gold (1985)	Mr. Prospector (1970)
Dam Stormy Welcome (2006)	Welcome Surprise (1997)	Seeking the Gold (1985)	Con Game (1974)
Dam Stormy Welcome (2006)	Welcome Surprise (1997)	Weekend Surprise (1980)	Secretariat (1970)
Dam Stormy Welcome (2006)	Welcome Surprise (1997)	Weekend Surprise (1980)	Lassie Dear (1974) (family 3-l)

Notes:
* Raging Sea is inbred 3S x 4D to the stallion Mr Prospector, meaning that he appears third generation on the sire side of his pedigree and fourth generation on the dam side of his pedigree.

* Raging Sea is inbred 5S x 4D to the stallion Northern Dancer (CAN), meaning that he appears fifth generation on the sire side of his pedigree through Vice Regent (CAN) and fourth generation on the dam side of his pedigree.
