= John R. Hofstatter =

American politician

John R. Hofstatter was an American politician. He was a member of the Wisconsin State Assembly during the 1911 session. Hofstatter was also an alderman in Baraboo, Wisconsin. He was a Democrat. Hofstatter was born in what is now Sumpter, Wisconsin in 1858.
