= Bluffview, Wisconsin =

Census-designated place in Wisconsin, United States

- Census-designated place
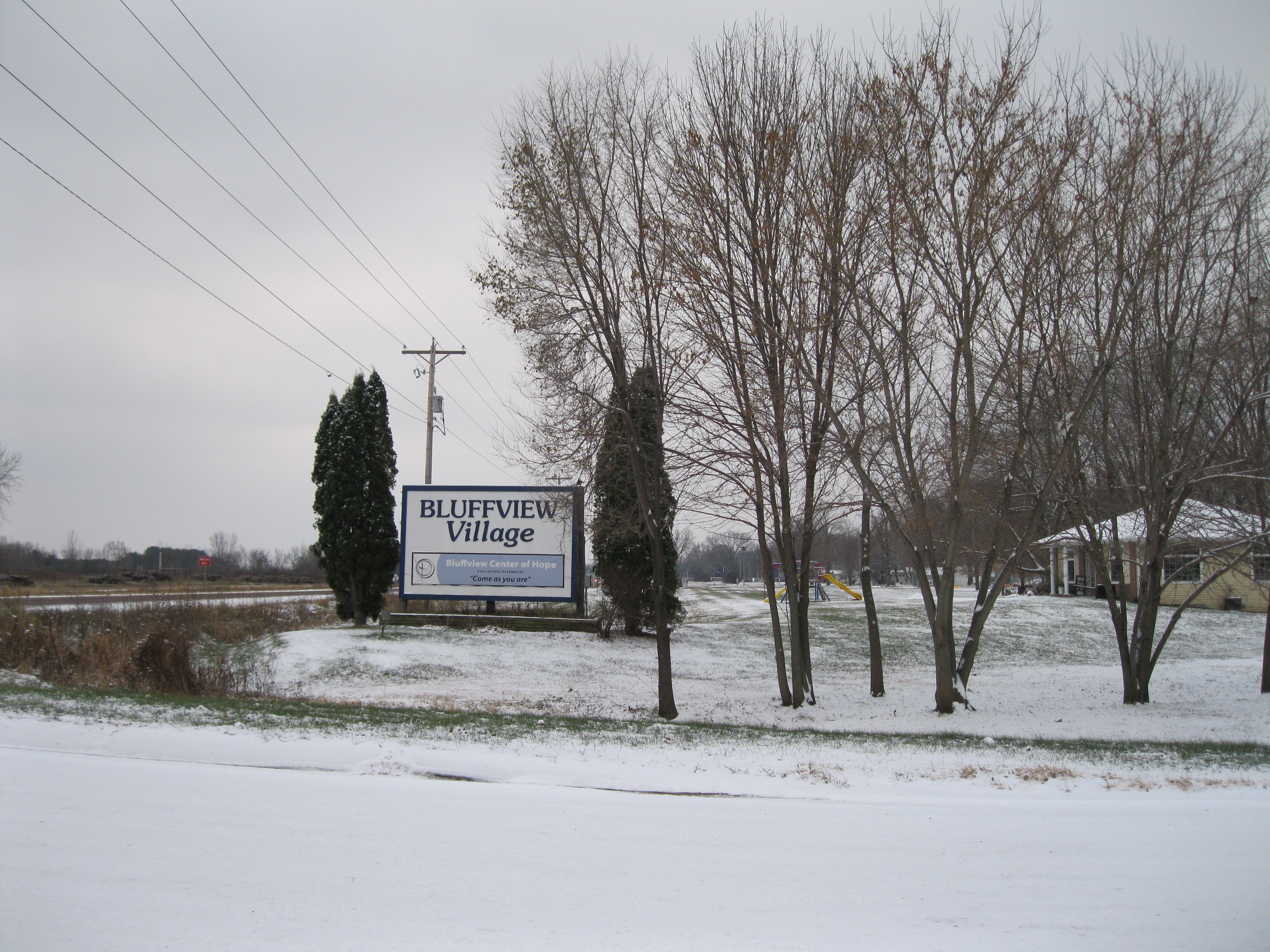
- Bluffview welcome sign

- Location within Wisconsin
- Coordinates: 43°22′16″N 89°46′23″W
- Country: United States
- State: Wisconsin
- County: Sauk

Area
  - Total: 0.388 sq mi (1.00 km^{2})
  - Land: 0.385 sq mi (1.00 km^{2})
  - Water: 0.003 sq mi (0.0078 km^{2})
- Elevation: 860 ft (260 m)

Population (2010)
  - Total: 742
  - Density: 1,930/sq mi (744/km^{2})
- Time zone: UTC-6 (Central (CST))
  - Summer (DST): UTC-5 (CDT)
- Area code: 608
- GNIS feature ID: 1577519

Bluffview is a census-designated place in the town of Sumpter, Sauk County, Wisconsin, United States, with a North Freedom address. As of the 2020 census, Bluffview had a population of 536.

== Description ==
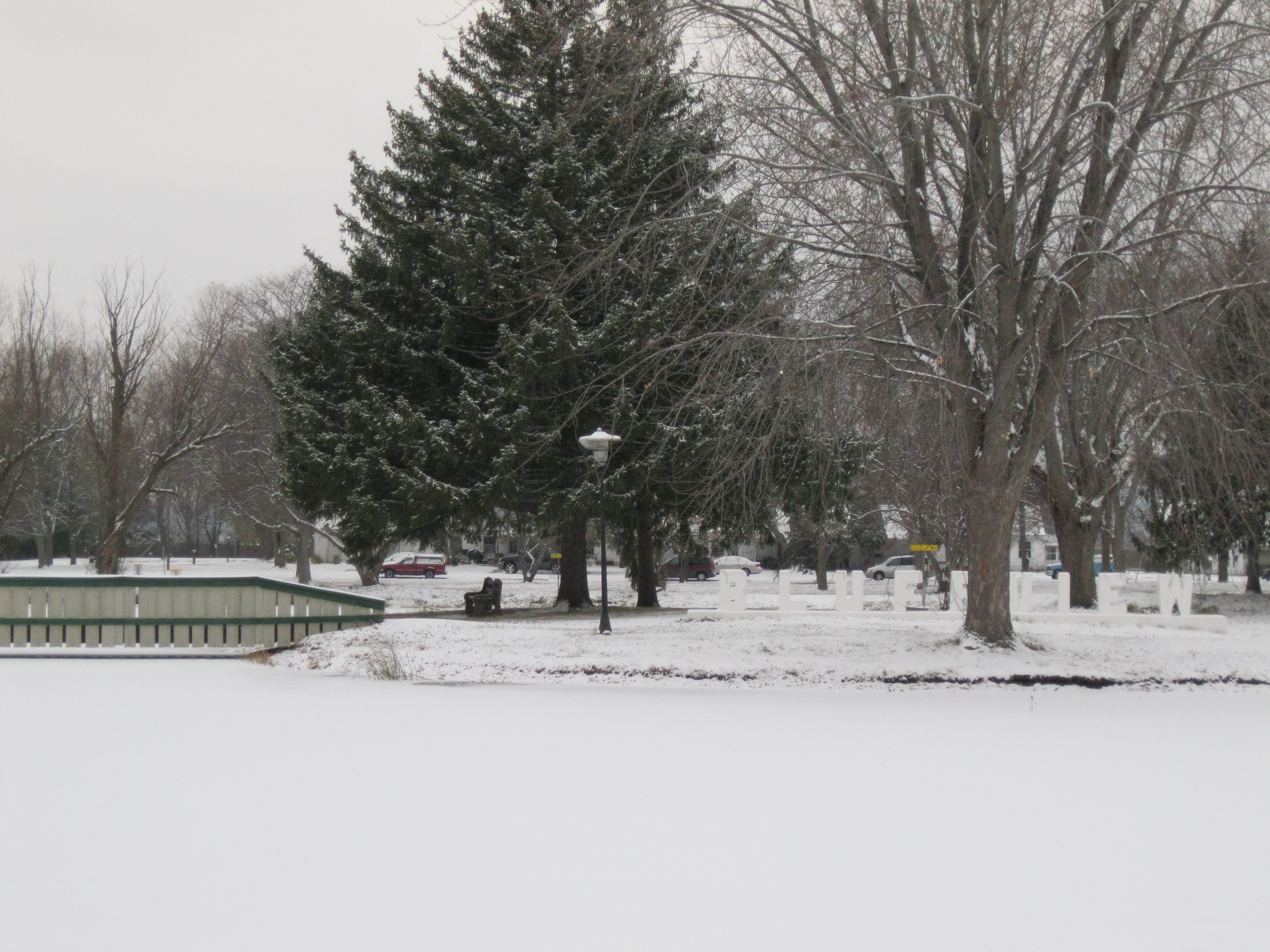
Park in Bluffview, November 2014

The community was started as housing for workers of the now defunct Badger Army Ammunition Plant. As of the 2010 census, its population was 742. Bluffview has an area of 0.388 square miles (1.00 km^{2}); 0.385 square miles (1.00 km^{2}) of this is land, and 0.003 square miles (0.0078 km^{2}) is water. Dr. Evermor's Forevertron can be found in Bluffview.

== See also ==
- List of census-designated places in Wisconsin
