= Sumpter, Wisconsin =

Town of Sumpter, Wisconsin
- Town
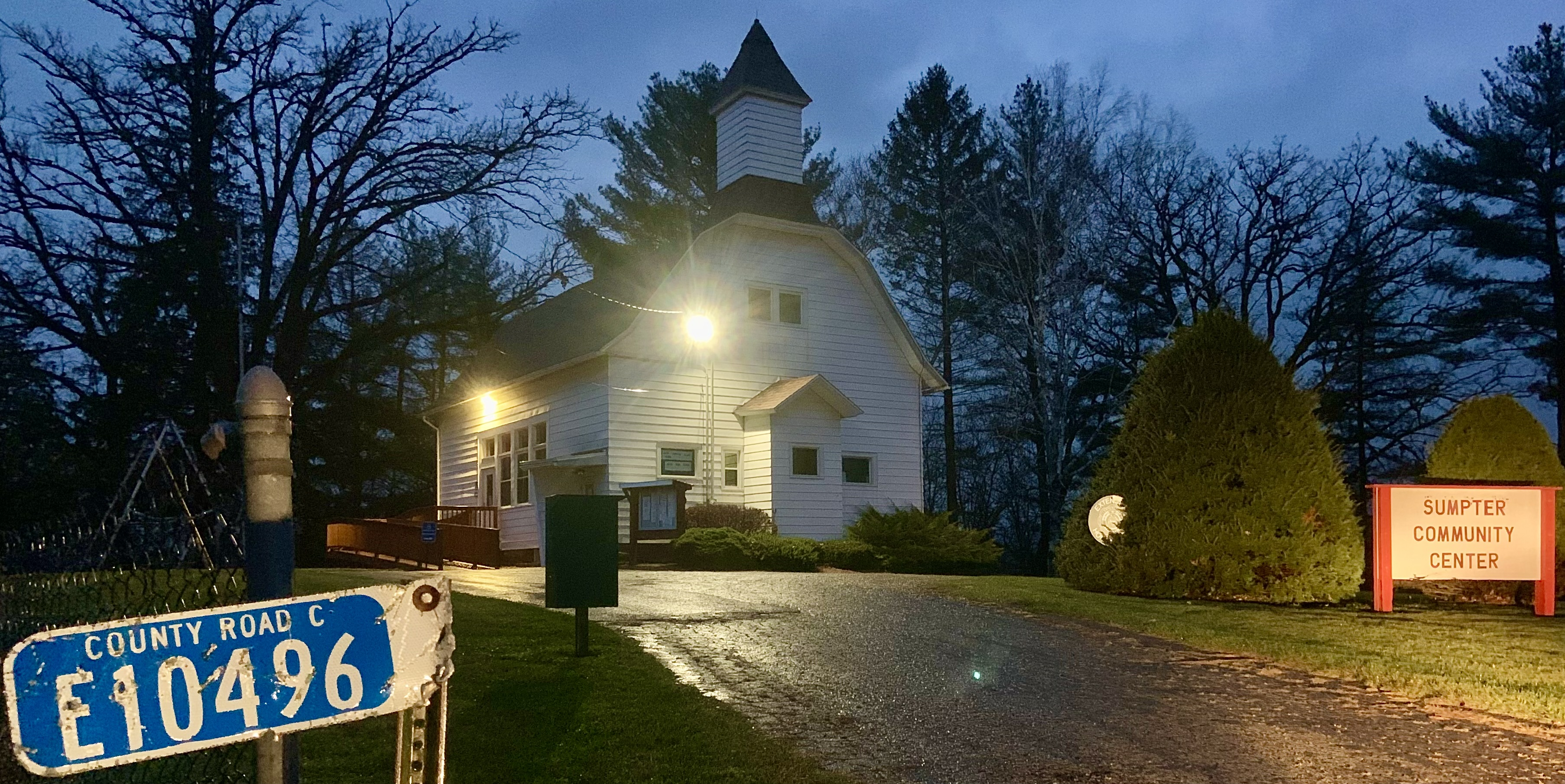
- Town Hall

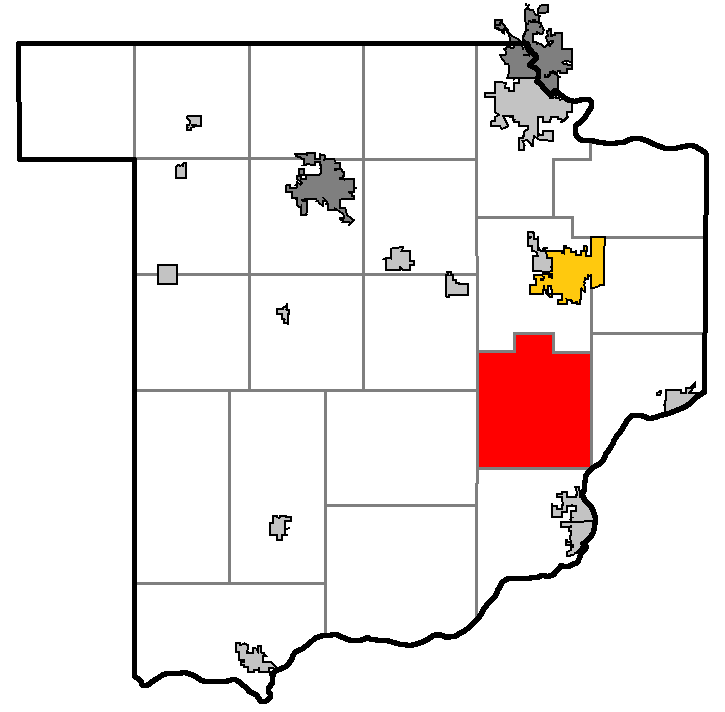
- Location of the Town of Sumpter, Wisconsin

- Location of Sauk County, Wisconsin
- Coordinates: 43°21′39″N 89°44′54″W
- Country: United States
- State: Wisconsin
- County: Sauk

Area
  - Total: 37.8 sq mi (97.9 km^{2})
  - Land: 37.7 sq mi (97.6 km^{2})
  - Water: 0.12 sq mi (0.3 km^{2})
- Elevation: 860 ft (262 m)

Population (2020)
  - Total: 1,055
  - Density: 27/sq mi (10.5/km^{2})
- Time zone: UTC-6 (Central (CST))
  - Summer (DST): UTC-5 (CDT)
- Area code: 608
- FIPS code: 55-78525
- GNIS feature ID: 1584254
- Website: https://twnofsumpter.gov/

The Town of Sumpter is located in Sauk County, Wisconsin, United States. It contains the census-designated place of Bluffview.

== History ==
The town was once called "Kingston," and this name conflicted with a same-named community in the state. At the start of the Civil War, the name was changed to "Sumter," in commemoration of the Battle of Fort Sumter, but an error in spelling on an early map resulted in the current name.

== Geography ==
According to the United States Census Bureau, the town has a total area of 37.8 square miles (97.9 km^{2}), of which 37.7 square miles (97.6 km^{2}) is land and 0.1 square mile (0.3 km^{2}) (0.29%) is water.

== Demographics ==
Historical population
Census	Pop.	Note	%±
2020	1,055		—

As of the census of 2000, there were 1,021 people, 402 households, and 260 families residing in the town. The population density was 27.1 people per square mile (10.5/km^{2}). There were 458 housing units at an average density of 12.1 per square mile (4.7/km^{2}). The racial makeup of the town was 91.48% White, 0.29% African American, 0.20% Native American, 0.20% Asian, 7.15% from other races, and 0.69% from two or more races. Hispanic or Latino of any race were 14.99% of the population.

There were 402 households, out of which 31.6% had children under the age of 18 living with them, 49.0% were married couples living together, 10.4% had a female householder with no husband present, and 35.3% were non-families. 26.4% of all households were made up of individuals, and 8.7% had someone living alone who was 65 years of age or older. The average household size was 2.51 and the average family size was 3.05.

The population was 26.7% under the age of 18, 8.8% from 18 to 24, 30.5% from 25 to 44, 20.8% from 45 to 64, and 13.2% who were 65 years of age or older. The median age was 34 years. For every 100 females, there were 100.2 males. For every 100 females age 18 and over, there were 98.4 males.

The median income for a household in the town was $31,806, and the median income for a family was $37,500. Males had a median income of $27,768 versus $24,479 for females. The per capita income for the town was $16,205. About 9.2% of families and 12.0% of the population were below the poverty line, including 13.5% of those under age 18 and 16.9% of those age 65 or over.

== Notable people ==
- John R. Hofstatter, Wisconsin State Representative, was born in Sumpter (then Kingston)
- William W. Perry, Wisconsin State Representative, lived in Sumpter
- Robert G. Siebecker, Chief Justice of the Wisconsin Supreme Court, was born in Sumpter
- Fred W. Zantow, Wisconsin State Senator, was born in Sumpter

== Buildings and structures ==
- Badger Army Ammunition Plant
- Forevertron

== See also ==
- List of towns in Wisconsin
