= On Fire Baby =

American thoroughbred racehorse

- Sire: Smoke Glacken
- Grandsire: Two Punch
- Dam: Orante
- Damsire: Gilded Time
- Sex: Mare
- Foaled: February 23rd, 2009
- Country: USA
- Breeder: Anita A. Ebert-Cauley
- Owner: Anita Cauley
- Trainer: Gary G. Hartlage
- Jockey: Joe M. Johnson
- Record: 17:6-2-1
- Earnings: $1,090,190

Major wins
- La Troienne Stakes (2014); Apple Blossom Handicap (2013)

On Fire Baby (foaled February 23rd, 2009) is an American Thoroughbred racehorse and the winner of the 2014 La Troienne Stakes.

== Career ==
On Fire Baby's first race was on August 19, 2011, at Ellis Park, where she came in first. Within two months of her career, she captured the 2011 Pocahontas Stakes, her first graded win. She then followed it up with a win at the 2011 Golden Rod Stakes.

To start 2012, she captured the 2012 Honeybee Stakes in March. Her next victory would not come until over a year later when she won the April 2013 Apple Blossom Handicap.

On Fire Baby took her first shot at the 2013 La Troienne Stakes, coming in 2nd place. She did not much see on track access until a 2nd place finish at the 2014 Apple Blossom Handicap, followed by her final win of her career at the 2014 La Troienne Stakes. She competed in her last race on September 6, 2014, coming in 6th at the Locust Grove Stakes.

== Pedigree ==
Pedigree of On Fire Baby(USA), 2009
Sire Smoke Glacken (USA) 1994	Two Punch (USA); 1983	Mr. Prospector	Raise a Native
Sire Smoke Glacken (USA) 1994	Two Punch (USA); 1983	Mr. Prospector	Gold Digger
Sire Smoke Glacken (USA) 1994	Two Punch (USA); 1983	Heavenly Cause	Grey Dawn
Sire Smoke Glacken (USA) 1994	Two Punch (USA); 1983	Heavenly Cause	Lady Dulcinea
Sire Smoke Glacken (USA) 1994	Majesty's Crown (USA); 1984	Magesterial	Northern Dancer
Sire Smoke Glacken (USA) 1994	Majesty's Crown (USA); 1984	Magesterial	Courting Days
Sire Smoke Glacken (USA) 1994	Majesty's Crown (USA); 1984	Queen's Crown	King Emperor
Sire Smoke Glacken (USA) 1994	Majesty's Crown (USA); 1984	Queen's Crown	Turn Capp
Dam Orante (USA) 1997	Gilded Time (USA); 1990	Timeless Moment	Damascus
Dam Orante (USA) 1997	Gilded Time (USA); 1990	Timeless Moment	Hour of Parting
Dam Orante (USA) 1997	Gilded Time (USA); 1990	Gilded Lilly	What A Pleasure
Dam Orante (USA) 1997	Gilded Time (USA); 1990	Gilded Lilly	Luquillo
Dam Orante (USA) 1997	Nile Chant (USA); 1991	Val De L'Orne	Val De Loir
Dam Orante (USA) 1997	Nile Chant (USA); 1991	Val De L'Orne	Aglae
Dam Orante (USA) 1997	Nile Chant (USA); 1991	River Chant	Upper Nile
Dam Orante (USA) 1997	Nile Chant (USA); 1991	River Chant	Light Verse
