= Smok'n Frolic =

American thoroughbred racehorse

- Sire: Smoke Glacken
- Grandsire: Two Punch
- Dam: Cherokyfrolicflash
- Sex: Mare
- Foaled: April 9th, 1999
- Country: USA
- Breeder: Cherokee Farms Inc.
- Owner: Dogwood Stable
- Trainer: Todd A. Pletcher
- Jockey: Edgar S. Prado
- Record: 33:9-8-2
- Earnings: $1,534,720

Smok'n Frolic (foaled April 9th, 1999) is an American Thoroughbred racehorse and the winner of the Next Move Handicap.

== Career ==
Smok'n Frolic's first race was on April 13, 2001, at Keeneland, where she came in fourth. She then won her next two races at Belmont Park, winning a Maiden Special Weight race and the 2001 Fashion Stakes

She raced in the Spinaway Stakes coming in 2nd, and picked up her first graded win at the 2001 Tempted Stakes. She followed that victory up with another win the following month at the 2001 Demoiselle Stakes.

She competed in multiple stakes races throughout 2002 but did not win any until the 2001 Cotillion Handicap in October.

She started off 2003 with a January win at the Vessels Stallion Farm Distaff Stakes. She then picked up another graded win in March at the 2003 Next Move Handicap. She won the 2003 Turfway Breeders' Cup Stakes, which was the last win of her season.

Her final win took place on March 14, 2004, at the Next Move Handicap. She continued racing until she finished her career off with a 5th place finish at the Ballerina Handicap.

== Pedigree ==
Pedigree of Smok'n Frolic (USA), 1999
Sire Smoke Glacken (USA) 1994	Two Punch (USA); 1983	Mr. Prospector	Raise a Native
Sire Smoke Glacken (USA) 1994	Two Punch (USA); 1983	Mr. Prospector	Gold Digger
Sire Smoke Glacken (USA) 1994	Two Punch (USA); 1983	Heavenly Cause	Grey Dawn
Sire Smoke Glacken (USA) 1994	Two Punch (USA); 1983	Heavenly Cause	Lady Dulcinea
Sire Smoke Glacken (USA) 1994	Majesty's Crown (USA); 1984	Magesterial	Northern Dancer
Sire Smoke Glacken (USA) 1994	Majesty's Crown (USA); 1984	Magesterial	Courting Days
Sire Smoke Glacken (USA) 1994	Majesty's Crown (USA); 1984	Queen's Crown	King Emperor
Sire Smoke Glacken (USA) 1994	Majesty's Crown (USA); 1984	Queen's Crown	Turn Capp
Dam Cherokyfrolicflash (USA) 1987	Green Dancer (USA); 1972	Nijinsky	Northern Dancer
Dam Cherokyfrolicflash (USA) 1987	Green Dancer (USA); 1972	Nijinsky	Flaming Page
Dam Cherokyfrolicflash (USA) 1987	Green Dancer (USA); 1972	Green Valley	Val De Loir
Dam Cherokyfrolicflash (USA) 1987	Green Dancer (USA); 1972	Green Valley	Sly Pola
Dam Cherokyfrolicflash (USA) 1987	Cherokee Frolic (USA); 1978	Cherokee Fellow	Funny Fellow
Dam Cherokyfrolicflash (USA) 1987	Cherokee Frolic (USA); 1978	Cherokee Fellow	Dame Francesca
Dam Cherokyfrolicflash (USA) 1987	Cherokee Frolic (USA); 1978	Fauchon	Final Ruling
Dam Cherokyfrolicflash (USA) 1987	Cherokee Frolic (USA); 1978	Fauchon	Boda
