= Badger Army Ammunition Plant =

Former munitions factory near Baraboo, Wisconsin

- Sauk County, near Sauk City, Wisconsin
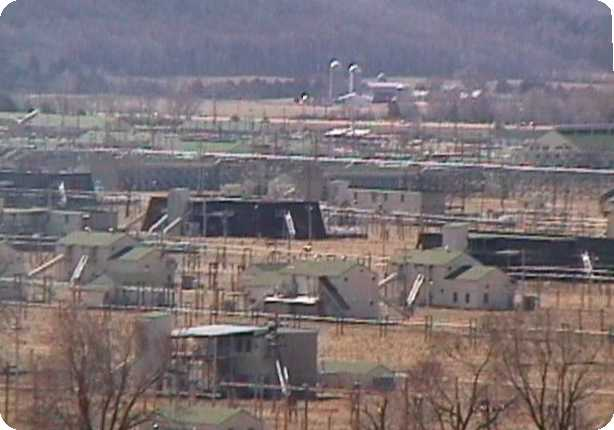
- General view toward west, Badger Army Ammunition Plant before demolition

Location
- Coordinates: 43°22′05″N 89°45′14″W

Site history
- Built: 1942
- In use: World War II, Korean War, Vietnam War

The Badger Army Ammunition Plant (BAAP or Badger) or Badger Ordnance Works (B.O.W.) is an excess, non-BRAC, United States Army facility located near Prairie du Sac, Wisconsin. It manufactured nitrocellulose-based propellants during World War II, the Korean War, and the Vietnam War. It was a large munitions factory during World War II. As of 2013, the facility was in the end stages of demolition and remediation in preparation for property transfer.

== History ==
=== Construction ===
On 29 October 1941, U.S. Representative William H. Stevenson announced the construction of a powder and acid works to be built by Hercules Powder Company. On 19 November 1941, despite protests from those living on Sauk Prairie, President Franklin D. Roosevelt authorized $65,000,000 to build the plant. By 1 March 1942, the farmers who lived there had left their farms.

Construction of Badger Ordnance Works, as it was known in World War II, began in March 1942. Before the works were built, a 75,000 foot fence was erected around approximately 7,500 acres (30 km^{2}) of the 10,500 acres (42 km^{2}) acquired by the U.S. Army. When the plant was finished, it contained smokeless powder and rocket grain production facilities, housing for 12,000 construction workers and their families for six months, housing for 4,000-8,000 production workers and their families for the length of World War II, a school, a recreation center, a child care facility, a hospital, cafeterias, and a transportation system. By December 1942, 24 miles (39 km) of standard gauge railroad were completed.

Within the first ten months of construction, the first production area went into operation. The plans originally called for production lines to make smokeless powder, diphenylamine, and sulfuric acid. In the end, the facility's production lines included smokeless powder, acid, sulfuric acid, rocket propellant, and Ball Powder.

During the 33 years it produced ammunition for World War II, the Korean War, and the Vietnam War, the Badger Army Ammunition Plant employed over 23,000 workers.

=== World War II ===
During World War II, Badger was managed by Hercules Powder Company. It produced rocket propellant, smokeless powder, and E.C. powder. Smokeless powder had been patented a decade before World War II by DuPont and Hercules Powder Company had the rights to make it at Badger. E.C. Powder was used in hand grenades, tear gas canisters, and blank cartridges. Badger also produced acid and oleum which are necessary for the production of these forms of ammunition. The acid and oleum produced at Badger were used both on site and at other Army ammunition plants in the area.

On 10 May 1943, the first train load of finished product left Badger; 60,000 pounds of smokeless powder was sent to the Twin Cities Ordnance Plant in Minnesota where it was used in M-1 rifle cartridges.

After World War II, the facility was placed on stand-by and subsequently placed into excess federal property status. The Hercules Powder Company began the process of demolishing and burning contaminated buildings, scrapping equipment, and donating office furniture and supplies to area schools. This led to some difficulties when Badger was reactivated for the Korean War.

Periods of Operation
Production Area	Start Date	End Date
Acid	January 1943	August 1945
Oleum	January 1943	August 1945
Smokeless powder	March 1943	July 1945
Rocket propellant	March 1945	September 1948
E.C. powder	July 1943	October 1945

Production
Ammunition Type	Pounds
Smokeless powder	257,968,900
Rocket grain	13,394,700

=== Korean War ===
In 1951, during the Korean War, Olin Industries was awarded the contract to manage Badger; the company continued to operate Badger until 2004. To get the plant into operational shape, Olin replaced machinery, office furniture and supplies, and added building production areas and capabilities such as the Ball Powder plant. At that time, Olin Industries was the only manufacturer of Ball Powder in the United States. Ball Powder, which was a trademarked name, had been introduced by Western Cartridge, a subsidiary of Olin Corporation, in 1933, but was not accepted by the U.S. Army until 1944.

Ball Powder is a fine-grained, spherical gunpowder coated in graphite that is easy to store and transport in any climate and ideal for modern infantry small arms ammunition cartridges. Because the time it took to build the Ball Powder plant at Badger was too long to enable any of the Ball Powder produced there to be used in the Korean War, it was put into storage and eventually used during the Vietnam War.

Periods of Operation
Production Area	Start Date	End Date
Acid	July 1951	November 1957
Oleum	October 1952	October 1956
Smokeless powder	October 1951	December 1957
Rocket propellant	November 1951	October 1954
Rocket propellant (2nd Run)	March 1955	September 1955
Ball Powder	September 1955	September 1956

Production
Ammunition Type	Pounds
Ball Powder	5,758,600
Smokeless powder	235,832,900
Rocket mortar	35,845,200
Mortar	17,400

=== Cold War ===
During the Cold War years between the Korean War and the Vietnam War, Badger was held in stand-by status. It was believed that Badger would not be reactivated unless a war was imminent because the threat of a nuclear strike existed. Badger was important to the United States because of its location far from large cities, its water source, small reactivation costs, and the fact that it had the greatest ammunition manufacturing capabilities in the United States; Badger had the capability of producing most of the ammunition necessary for a land war. These qualities of Badger also made it a likely target of a nuclear attack if it were to be reactivated. Therefore, Olin Corporation maintained Badger on stand-by status until the United States announced its intent to send troops to Vietnam.

=== Vietnam War ===
Before the Vietnam War began, the army was testing the new M16 rifle which used Ball Powder ammunition. DuPont and Olin Corporation each developed Ball Powder that was compatible with the M16 rifles used in the Vietnam War and were used interchangeably. Hercules Powder Company also developed a Ball Powder for the rifles; however, it was not selected by the rifle manufacturers or the U.S. Army.

Olin Corporation also had another, smaller, plant in East Alton, Illinois where it could make Ball Powder. It was believed that the East Alton plant would produce the Ball Powder necessary for the Vietnam War. However, when workers at the East Alton plant went on strike, the entire Vietnam operation was put into jeopardy. Therefore, Badger was reactivated on January 3, 1966, and Olin Corporation prepared to make what would be millions of pounds of ammunition before propellant production ended in 1975.

By September 1966, Badger was producing and shipping oleum, a highly concentrated sulfuric acid, to the Joliet Army Ammunition Plant near Chicago, Illinois, in addition to using it locally.

Periods of Operation
Production Area	Start Date	End Date
Acid	August 1966	June 1975
Oleum	September 1966	June 1975
Smokeless powder	August 1967	August 1973
Rocket propellant	June 1967	June 1975
Ball Powder	May 1966	May 1975

Production
Ammunition Type	Pounds
Ball Powder	99,985,600
Smokeless powder	302,151,100
5" Navy gun	12,869,500
MK-43 Rocket mortar	71,718,600

=== Post-war period ===
Olin Corporation continued to maintain Badger on stand-by status after the Vietnam War. The plant was initially laid away in 1977 and placed in stand-by status. In 1997, the U.S. Army declared Badger to be excess to its needs. Until 2004, Olin Corporation led the clean-up of Badger. In 2004, SpecPro, Inc., an 8(a) Certified Alaska Native Corporation (ANC) and subsidiary of the Bristol Bay Native Corporation, was awarded the contract to operate Badger, including all maintenance, demolition, and remediation activities. In 2012, Badger Technical Services, LLC became the sole contractor at Badger. Demolition of the Army manufacturing infrastructure began in 2004 and was completed in 2014.

=== Reuse ===
In early 2000, the Sauk County Board of Supervisors acted to establish a locally driven reuse planning process with the assistance of then-U.S. Congresswoman Tammy Baldwin and funds provided by the U.S. Department of Labor, establishing the Badger Reuse Committee (BRC). The 21-member BRC included representatives from neighboring communities, local, state, and federal governments, and the Ho-Chunk Nation. In its mission statement, the BRC charged itself with the task of developing "a common vision for the reuse of the Badger property that can be meaningfully considered and realistically implemented by the appropriate local, state, and federal agencies." It sought to achieve a community-based consensus for use of the site.

Early meetings were devoted to gathering and reviewing basic information about the Badger property and its role – past, present, and future – in Sauk County's landscape, community, and economy. In the past, the Badger lands had been a place of division and conflict. The committee identified nine key values and detailed criteria for each value to guide consideration of future uses. The BRC chose one plan that best fit the parameters of the values out of 25 different proposals. The reuse plan calls for all 7,275 acres to be managed as a whole. The land uses include conservation, prairie and savanna restoration, agriculture, education and recreation.

The Badger Reuse Plan established the need for a Badger Oversight and Management Board (BOMC), which meets bi-monthly to facilitate collaboration around the future uses of the Badger properties.

=== Future use ===
Once the installation was declared excess to the Army's needs, the General Services Administration (GSA), the federal government's real estate manager, received applications from other federal agencies interested in acquiring the land. Six applicants with federal sponsorship were approved but only five have agreed to accept property.

- United States Department of Agriculture (USDA) Dairy Forage
  The USDA Dairy Forage Research Center was established on a portion of the Badger installation in the 1970s. USDA accepted 1,960.67 acres (793.45 ha) in 2004 and 61.95 acres (25.07 ha) in 2005. Another 74.2 acres (30.0 ha) later transferred 2014. The research toward "greener horizons for cows, crops, and communities" continues at the USDA Dairy Forage Research Center on the land received.
- Bureau of Indian Affairs (BIA)/Ho-Chunk Nation
  In 2011, the BIA initially declined to accept any land (1553 acres) for the Ho-Chunk Nation, citing no authority to incur the cost of performing their own environmental assessment in addition to the work completed by the Army and the Wisconsin Department of Natural Resources. In 2012, the National Congress of American Indians (NCAI) passed a resolution in support of the Ho-Chunk and to encourage the BIA to accept surplus lands in trust on behalf of tribes. Finally, through a special act of congress, the Ho-Chunk Nation took control of the 1500-acre parcel in 2015.
- National Park Service (NPS)/Wisconsin Department of Natural Resources (WDNR)
  The NPS agreed to land use by the WDNR through the Federal Lands to Parks Program for park and recreation use. The transferred property will become the Sauk Prairie Recreation Area adjacent to and managed by Devil's Lake State Park. The Wisconsin Department of Natural Resources is drafting the master plan for the future Sauk Prairie Recreation Area, and now manages hunting on the property. The NPS and DNR will accept all land not transferred to other owners, including the acreage originally planned for the BIA/Ho-Chunk Nation.
- Town of Sumpter, Wisconsin
  The Town of Sumpter will receive the three historic cemeteries located at Badger and the water and wastewater systems. The Army acquired the cemeteries (Pioneer, Thoelke, and Miller) during the initial land acquisition in 1942 and has maintained them since. The cemetery acreage totals 3.6 acres (15,000 m^{2}).
- Bluffview Sanitary District
  The Town of Sumpter's Bluffview Sanitary District has received land relating to the sewage and water treatment system previously managed by the Army. The estimated area to be received is approximately 165 acres (67 ha). Bluffview, located across US 12 from Badger, is former Badger employee housing which has been further developed and is now private residences.
- Wisconsin Department of Transportation (WisDOT)
  WisDOT received land along the existing State Highway 78 to expand and straighten it. In 2011, 60.21 acres (24.37 ha) were transferred for the highway right-of-way. The department also controls the rail line that crosses the installation, by a permanent easement that has been rail banked for a trail under a long-term lease agreement with the WDNR (2011).

The Badger Army Information Repositories are located at the Sauk City Public Library, Ruth Culver Public Library, and at the Badger Army Ammunition Plant. The Badger Repositories include Army publications, RAB meeting minutes, groundwater monitoring data, and reports on remediation projects.

The mailing address is: Badger Army Ammunition Plant, S7560 Highway 12, North Freedom, Wisconsin 53951.

== Geography ==
Originally over 10,000 acres in size, in 2004 Badger consisted of 7,275 acres of land in Sauk County. It is bounded by Devil's Lake State Park and the Baraboo Hills to the north, the Town of Merrimac and the Wisconsin River to the east, the Town of Prairie du Sac to the south, and the Town of Sumpter and the Bluffview community to the west.

== Geology ==
Badger is located on the terminal moraine of the outwash plain of a glacier that stopped in the area during the Wisconsin Glaciation approximately 12,000 years ago. The bedrock in the area consists of quartzite, sandstone, shale, and limestone. Groundwater flow is influenced by the Baraboo Hills to the north and the Wisconsin River to the east.

== Vegetation ==
This area originally consisted of oak savanna and prairie habitat. After settlers populated the area, agriculture became predominant and few prairie and oak savanna remnants remained. Under Army management, the open spaces at Badger consisted of a few prairie remnants, some agricultural lands, and open grassy spaces around buildings maintained by grazing. Prairie restoration began in the 1970s and these areas were maintained by fire. Grazing ended in 2003 when demolition started, and the open areas are now growing up into shrubs such as autumn olive and honeysuckle.

== Environmental contamination ==
32 areas within the plant are polluted with solvents, toxic metals and explosive wastes. Groundwater beneath the plant is contaminated with cancer-causing chemicals, including carbon tetrachloride, trichloroethylene and dinitrotoluenes. An area known as the Propellant Burning Grounds is the source of a three-mile long plume of contaminated groundwater that has migrated offsite, polluting private drinking water wells in its path and flowing into the Wisconsin River. Since December 2003, dinitrotoluene (DNT) has been found in a number of private wells near the Badger Army Ammunition Plant. DNT was found above the Wisconsin Enforcement Standard in three private wells and three other private wells had nitrates above the Wisconsin ES. As of 2021, regular groundwater monitoring found hazardous levels of contaminants located halfway between Baraboo and Prairie du Sac. Restoration Advisory Board members and the Town Administrator were displeased with the Army's inaction and attempted to lobby Congress for direct funding to create a public water system.

== See also ==
Companies/Contractors

- Olin Corporation, previous contractor
- SpecPro, Inc., previous contractor
- Badger Technical Services, LLC. previous contractor
- SpecPro Professional Services, LLC current contractor
- The Shaw Group, previous contractor

Materials

- Ammunition
- Ball propellant
- Dinitrotoluene
- Nitrocellulose
- Nitroglycerin
- Oleum
- Propellant
- Rocket propellant
- Smokeless powder

Other AAPs Associated with Badger

- Joliet Army Ammunition Plant
- Ravenna Army Ammunition Plant

Other Topics

- Environmental remediation
- Prairie restoration
- Restoration ecology
