= William W. Perry =

American politician

William W. Perry was an American politician. He was a member of the Wisconsin State Assembly during the 1872 session. Other positions he held include Chairman of the Town Board (similar to city council) of Sumpter, Wisconsin in 1867, 1868, 1870 and 1871. He was a Republican. Perry was born on October 25, 1834, in Aurora, Erie County, New York.
