= Jersey Shore Stakes =

Jersey Shore Breeders' Cup Stakes
- Class: Ungraded
- Location: Monmouth Park Racetrack; Oceanport, New Jersey, United States
- Inaugurated: 1992
- Race type: Thoroughbred – Flat racing
- Website: www.monmouthpark.com

Race information
- Distance: 6 furlong sprint
- Surface: Dirt
- Track: left-handed
- Qualification: Three-year-olds
- Weight: Assigned
- Purse: $75,000

The Jersey Shore Breeders' Cup Stakes is an American Grade III Thoroughbred horse race run annually at Monmouth Park Racetrack in Oceanport, New Jersey. Open to three-year-olds, it is a six furlong sprint raced on dirt.

Inaugurated in 1992 at the Atlantic City Race Course, the Jersey Shore Stakes was moved to Monmouth Park in 1997 and won that year by Smoke Glacken.

== Records ==
Speed record:

- 1:07.47 – Idiot Proof (2007)

Most wins by a jockey:

- 6 – Joe Bravo (1995, 2000, 2004, 2005, 2006,2017)

== Past winners ==
- 2025 - Neoequos (Samuel Marin)
- 2024 - Book'em Danno (Samuel Marin)
- 2023 - Swirvin (Trevor McCarthy)
- 2022 - Provocateur (Jairo Rendon)
- 2021 – Real Talk (Paco Lopez)
- 2020 – Premier Star (Paco Lopez)
- 2019 – First Deal (Hector Rafael Diaz, Jr.)
- 2017 – Proforma (Joe Bravo)
- 2016 – Front Pocket Money (Antonio A. Gallardo)
- 2015 – Hebbronville (Trevor McCarthy)
- 2014 – Prudhoe Bay (Paco Lopez)
- 2013 – Rainbow Heir (Elvis Trujillo)
- 2012 – Well Spelled (Pablo Fragoso)
- 2011 – Flashpoint (Cornelio Velásquez)
- 2010 – Discreetly Mine (John R. Velazquez)
- 2009 – Custom for Carlos (Eddie Castro)
- 2008 – J Be K (Garrett K. Gomez)
- 2007 – Idiot Proof (Rajiv Maragh)
- 2006 – Henny Hughes (Joe Bravo)
- 2005 – Joey P (Joe Bravo)
- 2004 – Pomeroy (Joe Bravo)
- 2003 – Gators N Bears (Charles C. Lopez)
- 2002 – Boston Common (Eddie Martin Jr.)
- 2001 – City Zip (José C. Ferrer)
- 2000 – Disco Rico (Joe Bravo)(Maryland Champion Sprinter, 2001)
- 1999 – Yes It's True (Jerry D. Bailey)
- 1998 – Good and Tough (Herb McCauley)
- 1997 – Smoke Glacken (Craig Perret) (American Champion Sprint Horse, 1997)
- 1996 – Swing and Miss (Tommy Turner)
- 1995 – Ft Stockton (Joe Bravo)
- 1994 – End Sweep (Mike E. Smith)
- 1993 – Montbrook (Clarence Joseph Ladner, III)
- 1992 – Surely Six (Rick Wilson)
