= Next Move Handicap =

- Class: Grade III
- Location: Aqueduct Racetrack; Ozone Park, Queens, New York, United States
- Inaugurated: 1975
- Race type: Thoroughbred – Flat racing
- Website: www.nyra.com/index_aqueduct.html

Race information
- Distance: 1 1/8 miles (9 furlongs)
- Surface: Dirt
- Track: left-handed
- Qualification: Fillies & Mares, three-years-old & up
- Weight: Assigned
- Purse: US$100,000

The Next Move Handicap is an American Thoroughbred horse race run annually near the end of March at Aqueduct Racetrack in Ozone Park, Queens, New York. A Grade III event open to fillies and Mares, age three and older, it is contested on dirt over a distance of one mile and one furlong. It offers a purse of $100,000.

Inaugurated in 1975, the race was restricted to three-year-old fillies at one mile in 1975. It was contested at a mile and three sixteenths from 1984 through 1994.

The race is named in honor of the filly Next Move who was the American Champion Three-Year-Old Filly of 1950 and the American Co-Champion Older Female Horse in 1952.

Since inception, the Next Move Handicap has been contested at various distances:

- 1 mile : 1975
- 1 1/8 miles : 1976–1983, 1995–present
- 1 3/16 miles : 1984–1994

On December 4, 2009, the New York Racing Association announced that the Next Move Handicap was being placed on hiatus.

== Records ==
Speed record: (at current distance of 1 1/8 miles)

- 1:48.96 – Diggins (1999)

Most wins:

- 2 – One Sum (1978, 1979)

Most wins by a jockey:

- 4 – Ruben Hernandez (1976, 1978, 1979, 1981)
- 4 – Mike Luzzi (1994, 1995, 2007, 2009)

Most wins by a trainer:

- 4 – Todd A. Pletcher (2003, 2004, 2006, 2007)

Most wins by an owner:

- 2 – Charles T. Wilson Jr. (1978, 1979)
- 2 – Nelson Bunker Hunt (1980, 1984)
- 2 – H. Joseph Allen (1981, 1982)
- 2 – Edward P. Evans (1998, 2002)
- 2 – Dogwood Stable (2003, 2004)

== Winners ==
Year	Winner	Age	Jockey	Trainer	Owner	Time
2010	no race					
2009	Weathered	4	Mike Luzzi	Karl Grusmark	Chevalier Stable	1:52.44
2008	Wow Me Free	4	Alan Garcia	Kiaran McLaughlin	Edward A. Seltzer	1:50.86
2007	Indian Vale	5	Mike Luzzi	Todd A. Pletcher	Eugene Melnyk	1:50.51
2006	Fleet Indian	5	José A. Santos	Todd A. Pletcher	Paul Saylor	1:49.32
2005	Daydreaming	4	Edgar Prado	Claude McGaughey III	Phipps Stable	1:50.77
2004	Smok'n Frolic	5	Richard Migliore	Todd A. Pletcher	Dogwood Stable	1:51.55
2003	Smok'n Frolic	4	John Velazquez	Todd A. Pletcher	Dogwood Stable	1:49.11
2002	With Ability	4	Javier Castellano	Mark A. Hennig	Edward P. Evans	1:49.88
2001	Atelier	4	Edgar Prado	Claude McGaughey III	Robert N. Clay	1:50.60
2000	Biogio's Rose	6	Norberto Arroyo, Jr.	Robert Ribaudo	J. & A. Nastasi	1:51.32
1999	Diggins	5	Jose Espinoza	Mark A. Hennig	December Hill Farm	1:48.96
1998	Panama Canal	4	Shaun Bridgmohan	Mark A. Hennig	Edward P. Evans	1:51.37
1997	Full and Fancy	5	Richard Migliore	John C. Kimmel	Red Oak Stables	1:51.12
1996	Madame Adolphe	4	Filiberto Leon	Susan Duncan	Leroy Close	1:51.39
1995	Restored Hope	4	Mike Luzzi	Bruce N. Levine	John Valentino	1:52.26
1994	Groovy Feeling	5	Mike Luzzi	Peter Ferriola	Robert Donaldson	1:59.79
1993	Low Tolerance	4	Mike Smith	John M. Veitch	Darby Dan Farm	1:55.93
1992	Spy Leader Lady	4	Mike Smith	Gasper S. Moschera	Joques Farm	2:00.20
1991	Buy The Firm	5	Herb McCauley	Carlos F. Martin	Morven Stud Farm	1:56.40
1990	Bold Wench	5	Jorge Velásquez	Jose A. Martin	Jack R. Maro	1:58.40
1989	Rose's Cantina	5	Eddie Maple	LeRoy Jolley, Jr.	Carl Icahn	1:59.80
1988	Triple Wow	4	Richard Migliore	Roger Attfield	Kinghaven Farms	1:57.60
1987	Tricky Squaw	4	Chris Antley	D. Wayne Lukas	Eugene V. Klein	1:58.40
1986	Cherry Jubilee	4	Carlos Marquez, Jr.	H. Allen Jerkens	Charles M. Armstrong	1:56.00
1985	Flip's Pleasure	5	Jean-Luc Samyn	H. Allen Jerkens	Hobeau Farm	1:58.20
1984	Adept	5	Michael Venezia	Frank I. Wright	Nelson Bunker Hunt	1:57.80
1983	Chieftain's Command	4	Alfredo Smith, Jr.	John Parisella	Theodore M. Sabarese	1:53.20
1982	Andover Way	4	Jorge Velásquez	Howard M. Tesher	H. Joseph Allen	1:50.20
1981	Plankton	5	Ruben Hernandez	Howard M. Tesher	H. Joseph Allen	1:53.40
1980	Water Lily	4	Marco Castaneda	not found	Nelson Bunker Hunt	1:51.00
1979	One Sum	5	Ruben Hernandez	Luis Barrera	Charles T. Wilson Jr.	1:53.00
1978	One Sum	4	Ruben Hernandez	Luis Barrera	Charles T. Wilson Jr.	1:52.80
1977	Forty Nine Sunsets	4	Jacinto Vásquez	Frank Gomez	Janet Gomez	1:51.00
1976	Yes Dear Maggy	4	Ruben Hernandez	Robert S. DuBois	John C. Oxley	1:49.40
1975	My Juliet	3	Darrel McHargue	Eugene Euster	George Weasel, Jr.	1:35.60
