= La Troienne Stakes =

- Class: Grade I
- Location: Churchill Downs; Louisville, Kentucky, United States
- Inaugurated: 1986 (as Louisville Budweiser Breeders' Cup Handicap)
- Race type: Thoroughbred – Flat racing
- Sponsor: Fasig-Tipton (2024)
- Website: Churchill Downs

Race information
- Distance: 1 1/16 miles
- Surface: Dirt
- Track: left-handed
- Qualification: Fillies & Mares, four-years-old & up
- Weight: 123lbs with allowances
- Purse: $1,000,000 (since 2024)

The La Troienne Stakes is a Grade I American Thoroughbred horse race for fillies and mares, age four and older, over a distance of 1 1/16 miles held annually in early May on the Kentucky Oaks day meeting at Churchill Downs in Louisville, Kentucky during the spring meeting. The current purse is $1,000,000.

== History ==
The event was inaugurated on May 3, 1986, on Kentucky Derby Day as the Louisville Budweiser Breeders' Cup Handicap at a distance of 1 1/8 miles for three-year-olds and older and was won by the favorite, five-year-old gelding Hopeful Word in small field of four starters.

The following year the event's conditions were changed to fillies & mares that were four years old or older.

The event with Budweiser and Breeders' Cup sponsorship and added incentives to base purses attracted good quality runners. The event was classified as a Grade III in 1988 and it was upgraded once more in 1990. The event was renamed to Louisville Breeders' Cup Stakes in 2007, Louisville Stakes in 2008 and Louisville Distaff Stakes in 2009. In 2010 the race was renamed after the famous broodmare La Troienne to the La Troienne Stakes.

This event was upgraded to a Grade I for its 2014.

Of the more notable runnings of this event was the 2010 edition which saw the heavily favored 2009 US Horse of the Year Rachel Alexandra returning to Churchill Downs for the first time since her 2009 Kentucky Oaks victory trying to lead all the way but was defeated by Unbridled Belle by a head. The 1996 winner Escena went on to win the Breeders' Cup Distaff and become US Champion Older Female Horse. The 2008 winner Ginger Punch won this event easily as the reigning 2007 US Champion Older Female Horse as an overwhelming favorite.

== Records ==
Speed record

- 1:42.09 – Authenticity (2013)

Margins

- 7 3/4 lengths – You (2003)

Most wins

- No horse has won this race more than once.

Most wins by a jockey

- 5 – Calvin Borel (1997, 1999, 2004, 2007, 2009)

Most wins by an owner

- 2 – Allen E. Paulson (1992, 1998)
- 2 – John A. Franks (1997, 1999)
- 2 – The Thoroughbred Corporation (2001, 2002)

== Winners ==
Year	Winner	Age	Jockey	Trainer	Owner	Distance	Time	Purse	Grade	Ref
La Troienne Stakes
2026	Shred the Gnar	4	Luis Saez	Brian A. Lynch	Flying Dutchman Breeding & Racing	1 1/16 miles	1:42.24	$1,000,000	1	
2025	Raging Sea	5	Flavien Prat	Chad C. Brown	Alpha Delta Stables	1 1/16 miles	1:42.91	$992,000	I	
2024	Idiomatic	5	Florent Geroux	Brad H. Cox	Juddmonte Farms	1 1/16 miles	1:43.24	$1,000,000	I	
2023	Played Hard	5	John R. Velazquez	Philip A. Bauer	Rigney Racing	1 1/16 miles	1:42.48	$750,000	I	
2022	Pauline's Pearl	4	Joel Rosario	Steven M. Asmussen	Stonestreet Stables	1 1/16 miles	1:42.46	$750,000	I	
2021	Shedaresthedevil	4	Florent Geroux	Brad H. Cox	Flurry Racing Stables, Qatar Racing Limited & Big Aut Farms	1 1/16 miles	1:42.69	$500,000	I	
2020	Monomoy Girl	5	Florent Geroux	Brad H. Cox	Michael Dubb, Monomoy Stables, The Elkstone Group & Bethlehem Stables	1 1/16 miles	1:42.14	$500,000	I	
2019	She's a Julie	4	Ricardo Santana Jr.	Steven M. Asmussen	Whispering Oaks Farm, Team Hanley, Tim & Anna Cambron, Bradley Thoroughbreds, Madaket Stables	1 1/16 miles	1:43.58	$500,000	I	
2018	Salty	4	Tyler Gaffalione	Mark E. Casse	Gary Barber, Baccari Racing Stable & Chester Prince	1 1/16 miles	1:43.78	$350,000	I	
2017	Big World	4	Florent Geroux	Thomas M. Amoss	Maggi Moss	1 1/16 miles	1:44.91	$300,000	I	
2016	Curalina	4	John R. Velazquez	Todd A. Pletcher	Eclipse Thoroughbred Partners	1 1/16 miles	1:42.45	$300,000	I	
2015	Molly Morgan	6	Corey J. Lanerie	Dale L. Romans	William D. Cubbedge	1 1/16 miles	1:43.25	$300,000	I	
2014	On Fire Baby	5	Joe M. Johnson	Gary G. Hartlage	Anita Cauley	1 1/16 miles	1:43.48	$327,000	I	
2013	Authenticity	6	John R. Velazquez	Todd A. Pletcher	Padua Stables	1 1/16 miles	1:42.09	$335,100	II	
2012	Juanita	4	Ramon A. Dominguez	Michael J. Maker	William S. & Graydon Patterson	1 1/16 miles	1:42.82	$327,000	II	
2011	Blind Luck	4	Garrett K. Gomez	Jerry Hollendorfer	Mark DeDomenico, John Carver, Peter Abruzzo & Jerry Hollendorfer	1 1/16 miles	1:42.93	$339,900	II	
2010	Unrivaled Belle	4	Kent J. Desormeaux	William I. Mott	Peter Vegso & Gary Seidler	1 1/16 miles	1:42.97	$418,800	II	
Louisville Distaff Stakes
2009	Miss Isella	4	Calvin H. Borel	Ian R. Wilkes	Domino Stud of Lexington	1 1/16 miles	1:42.75	$379,700	II	
Louisville Stakes
2008	Ginger Punch	5	Rafael Bejarano	Robert J. Frankel	Stronach Stables	1 1/16 miles	1:43.08	$268,200	II	
Louisville Breeders' Cup Stakes
2007	Fiery Pursuit	4	Calvin H. Borel	D. Wayne Lukas	Overbrook Farm	1 1/16 miles	1:44.11	$305,197	II	
Louisville Breeders' Cup Handicap
2006	Oonagh Maccool (IRE)	4	Rafael Bejarano	Todd A. Pletcher	Charles H. Wacker III	1 1/16 miles	1:42.96	$271,000	II	
2005	Shadow Cast	4	Robby Albarado	Neil J. Howard	William S. Farish III	1 1/16 miles	1:42.43	$336,300	II	
2004	Lead Story	5	Calvin H. Borel	Carl A. Nafzger	A. Stephen Miles Jr.	1 1/16 miles	1:44.37	$327,000	II	
2003	You	4	Jerry D. Bailey	Robert J. Frankel	Edmund A. Gann	1 1/16 miles	1:43.21	$325,500	II	
2002	Spain	5	Jerry D. Bailey	D. Wayne Lukas	The Thoroughbred Corporation	1 1/16 miles	1:43.93	$332,700	II	
2001	Saudi Poetry	4	Victor Espinoza	Bob Baffert	The Thoroughbred Corporation	1 1/16 miles	1:42.53	$279,000	II	
2000	Heritage of Gold	5	Shane Sellers	Thomas M. Amoss	Jack Garey	1 1/16 miles	1:42.99	$255,250	II	
1999	Silent Eskimo	4	Calvin H. Borel	Bobby C. Barnett	John A. Franks	1 1/16 miles	1:43.82	$268,250	II	
1998	Escena	5	Jerry D. Bailey	William I. Mott	Allen E. Paulson	1 1/16 miles	1:44.84	$287,750	II	
1997	Halo America	7	Calvin H. Borel	Bobby C. Barnett	John A. Franks	1 1/16 miles	1:42.78	$222,600	II	
1996	Jewel Princess	4	Chris McCarron	Wallace Dollase	Richard J. Stephen	1 1/16 miles	1:42.50	$220,000	II	
Louisville Budweiser Breeders' Cup Handicap
1995	Fit to Lead	5	Kent Desormeaux	Richard E. Mandella	Jim Colbert, Randall D. Hubbard, Connie Sczesny	1 1/16 miles	1:43.46	$212,500	II	
1994	One Dreamer	6	Gary Stevens	Thomas F. Proctor	Glen Hill Farm	1 1/16 miles	1:43.73	$210,200	II	
1993	Quilma (CHI)	6	José A. Santos	Claude R. McGaughey III	Tri-Honors Stable	1 1/16 miles	1:44.61	$92,800	II	
1992	Fowda	4	Pat Valenzuela	Richard J. Lundy	Allen E. Paulson	1 1/16 miles	1:44.16	$155,000	II	
1991	Fit for a Queen	5	Jerry D. Bailey	Steven C. Penrod	Hermitage Farm	1 1/16 miles	1:43.13	$156,200	II	
1990	Connie's Gift	4	Pat Day	Neil J. Howard	William S. Farish III & William S. Kilroy	1 1/16 miles	1:45.80	$154,500	II	
1989	Darien Miss	4	Patrick A. Johnson	George R. Arnold II	Taylor Asbury	1 1/16 miles	1:46.00	$155,000	III	
1988	By Land By Sea	5	Fernando Toro	Gary F. Jones	Jayeff B Stable	1 1/16 miles	1:43.20	$154,150	III	
1987	Queen Alexandra	5	Don Brumfield	George M. Baker	Rosalind Rosenthal	1 1/16 miles	1:42.80	$154,300		
1986	Hopeful Word	5	Pat Day	Carl Bowman	James Clifton, Robert Doll & Barrett Morris	1 1/8 miles	1:49.40	$153,550		†3YO & up

Notes:
† Inaugural event in 1986 the conditions of the event were for horses three years old and older

== See also ==
- List of American and Canadian Graded races
