= Joe Bravo (jockey) =

American jockey

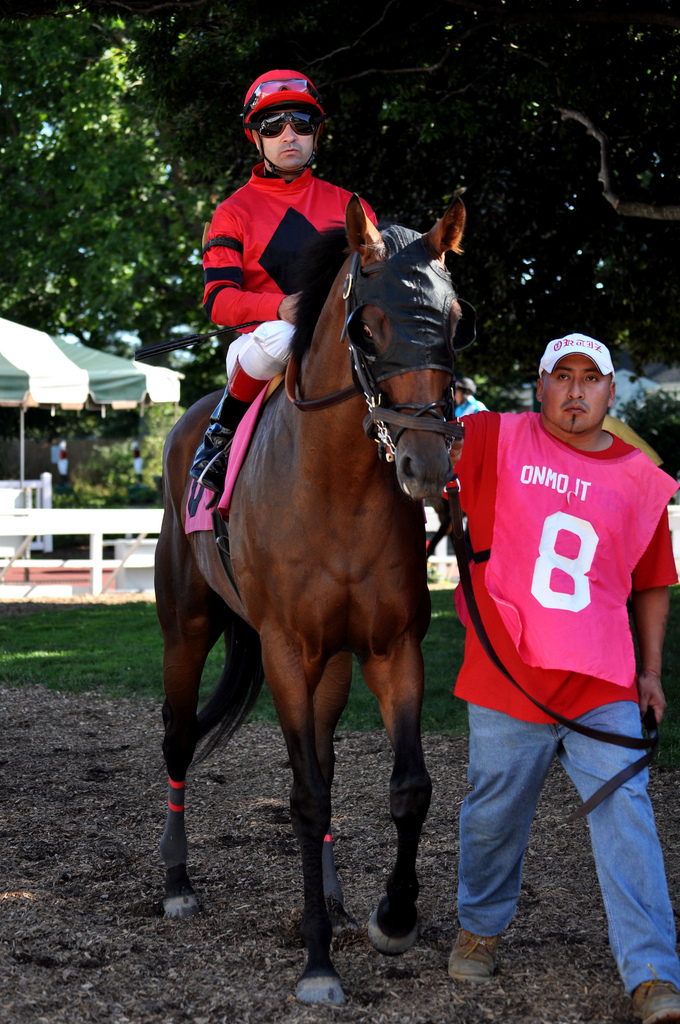
- Bravo in the paddock at Monmouth Park (2011)

Personal information
- Born: September 10, 1971 (age 54) Long Branch, New Jersey, U.S.
- Occupation: Jockey

Horse racing career
- Sport: Horse racing
- Career wins: 5,600+

Major racing wins
- Pennsylvania Derby (1994, 2003, 2008); Ballerina Handicap (1997); Donn Handicap (1997); Jamaica Handicap (1999); Belmont Futurity (1999); H. Allen Jerkens Memorial Stakes (2003); Haskell Invitational Stakes (2004); Cotillion Handicap (2006); Alfred G. Vanderbilt Handicap (2011, 2016); Turf Classic Stakes (2012); United Nations Stakes (2012, 2013, 2015, 2017, 2020); Sword Dancer Invitational Handicap (2013); Arkansas Derby (2014); Spinaway Stakes (2014); Delaware Handicap (2015); Beverly D. Stakes (2015); Personal Ensign Stakes (2015); Joe Hirsch Turf Classic Stakes (2015); Champagne Stakes (2015); Madison Stakes (2016); Stephen Foster Handicap (2016); Forego Stakes (2016); First Lady Stakes (2017); Hudson Stakes (NYB) (2017); Carter Handicap (2018); Spinster Stakes (2018, 2019); American Oaks (2019); Bing Crosby Stakes (2022) Breeders' Cup wins: Breeders' Cup Distaff (2019)

Racing awards
- Mike Venezia Memorial Award (2018); George Woolf Memorial Jockey Award (2022)

Significant horses
- A. P. Indian, Big Blue Kitten, Blue Prize, Danza, Little Mike, Sheer Drama
- Updated on December 1, 2023

Joe Bravo (born September 10, 1971) is an American jockey in thoroughbred horse racing. The son and grandson of jockeys, he began his professional career in Thoroughbred flat racing at Calder Race Course in Miami Gardens, Florida Where he made his first winning mount at the latter end of 1988.

Nicknamed "Jersey Joe", Bravo has won 22 riding titles in his career at racetracks in New Jersey—13 at Monmouth Park and nine at the Meadowlands. He got his big break in 1997 when he rode Formal Gold to his victories that year. Bravo has won the Jersey Shore Breeders' Cup Stakes five times, including three straight from 2004 through 2006.

In 2019, Joe Bravo won the Breeders' Cup Distaff, his first victory after 21 career mounts at the Breeders' Cup.

In June 2021, Bravo announced that he would be relocating to ride in Southern California, starting at Santa Anita Park. He will be represented by agent Matt Nakatani, the son of retired jockey Corey Nakatani. Bravo declined to ride in New Jersey since the start of the 2021 Monmouth Park meet in disagreement with new rules regarding the use of the riding crop implemented by the New Jersey Racing Commission. He returned in 2022.

Chart (2000–present)	Rank by earnings
National Earnings List for Jockeys 2000	26
National Earnings List for Jockeys 2001	42
National Earnings List for Jockeys 2002	294
National Earnings List for Jockeys 2003	43
National Earnings List for Jockeys 2004	18
National Earnings List for Jockeys 2005	25
National Earnings List for Jockeys 2006	24
National Earnings List for Jockeys 2007	31
National Earnings List for Jockeys 2008	23
National Earnings List for Jockeys 2009	33
National Earnings List for Jockeys 2010	26
National Earnings List for Jockeys 2011	23
National Earnings List for Jockeys 2012	31
National Earnings List for Jockeys 2013	29
National Earnings List for Jockeys 2014	28
National Earnings List for Jockeys 2015	17
National Earnings List for Jockeys 2016	27
National Earnings List for Jockeys 2017	33
