= Monmouth Park Racetrack =

Horse racing track in New Jersey

Coordinates: 40°18′34.85″N 74°0′52.15″W

- Racetrack logo
- Interactive map of Monmouth Park Racetrack
- Location: 175 Oceanport Ave. Oceanport, New Jersey 07757; United States
- Owned by: NJSEA
- Operated by: Darby Development, LLC
- Date opened: July 30, 1870 (156 years ago)
- Screened on: NBC (Haskell Invitational Stakes)
- Course type: Flat
- Notable races: Haskell Invitational Stakes (G1); United Nations Stakes (G2); Molly Pitcher Stakes (G2); Monmouth Cup (G3); Philip H. Iselin Stakes (G3)

Monmouth Park Racetrack is an American race track for thoroughbred horse racing in Oceanport, New Jersey, United States. It is owned by the New Jersey Sports and Exposition Authority and is operated under a five-year lease as a partnership with Darby Development, LLC.

Monmouth Park's marquee event is the Haskell Invitational, named after Amory L. Haskell. The Haskell was first run in 1968 as a handicap, but was made into an Invitational Handicap in 1981. It is now a 1 1/8 mi (1.8 km) test for three-year-olds run in late July. Monmouth Park also now showcases the Jersey Derby originally run at Garden State Park until its closure in 2001. The racetrack's season spans from early May to Labor Day in early September.

== History ==
=== Long Branch Racetrack ===
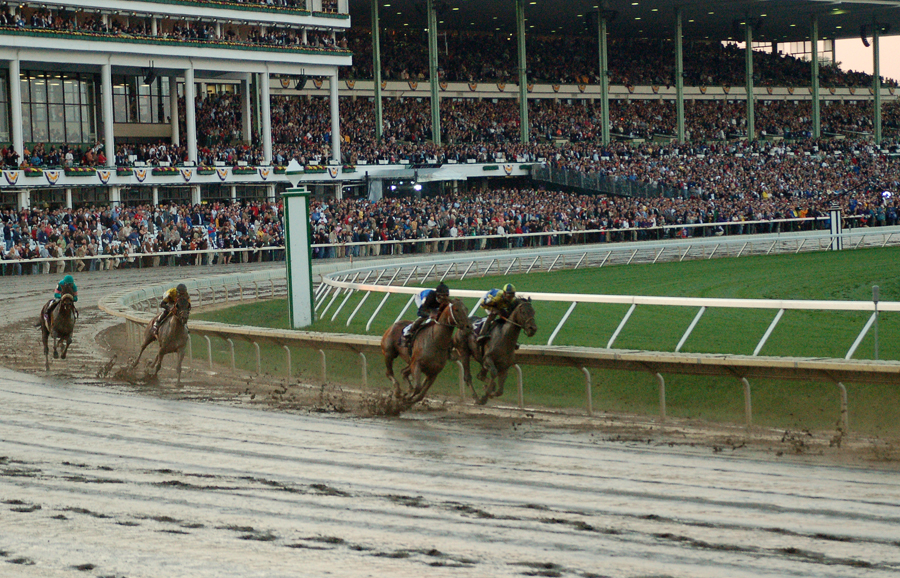
The racetrack and part of the stands during the 2007 Breeders' Cup

Three different buildings have been called Monmouth Park throughout the years. The original thoroughbred racing track was opened by the Monmouth Park Association on July 30, 1870 in Eatontown, New Jersey to increase summer tourism for communities along the Jersey Shore. Monmouth Park early on earned the nickname as the "Newmarket of America" due to the excellence of its racing. However, after three years of being open financial issues caused the track to close.

In 1878, the track was bought by David D. Withers, George L. Lorillard, James Gordon Bennett, Jr., and George P. Wetmore. The men spent four years renovating the grounds and grandstand and reopened Monmouth Park in 1882. From 1882 to 1890, the track increased in popularity and as a result, a new racetrack was constructed next to the original. The new racetrack opened in 1890 becoming the second Monmouth Park. However, legislation proposed in 1891 and enacted in 1894 barred parimutuel betting in New Jersey, and the track closed its doors. In May 1894, the Township Committee at Eatontown, New Jersey ordered the seizure and sale of the Monmouth Park Association's grandstand and other property for the payment of back taxes and on May 7 was sold at a public auction.

Some of the major races held at the Long Branch track included the Champion Stakes, Junior Champion Stakes, Freehold Stakes and the Monmouth Cup. The United States Department of the Army later constructed Fort Monmouth on the site of the former racetrack.

=== Monmouth Park Jockey Club ===
In 1939, the State of New Jersey re-legalized parimutuel horse race betting. In 1946, the New Jersey Legislature passed a bill providing for state regulation of horse racing. The bill was championed by Amory L. Haskell, who led the legislative charge to once again permit wagering on horse racing in New Jersey and Philip H. Iselin, a New York City textile magnate. They also had the backing of Reeve Schley, Joseph M. Roebling, John M. MacDonald, Townsend B. Martin, and James Cox Brady, Jr. The current Monmouth Park, now called the Monmouth Park Jockey Club, opened on June 19, 1946. Thoroughbred racing was back at the facility after a 53-year hiatus with 18,724 in attendance.

=== Monmouth Park Racetrack ===
The New Jersey Sports and Exposition Authority purchased Monmouth Park from its previous owners, the Monmouth Park Jockey Club, in 1985, in a deal valued at $45 million. The NJSEA still retains the corporate name "Monmouth Park Jockey Club".

The Vans Warped Tour, a touring music and extreme sports festival, was successfully held at the racetrack in 2010 and 2011. It marks the New York stop on the nationwide tour, which visits the area during July. In 2012, the festival moved to the PNC Bank Arts Center in nearby Holmdel, New Jersey due to financial considerations.

In 2011, a five-year lease was signed with Morris Bailey, co-owner of Resorts Casino Hotel in Atlantic City, to provide a marketing partnership between the casino and racetrack. The agreement allowed Resorts to sponsor the Haskell Invitational, and possibilities include a merging of loyalty programs as well as bringing entertainers' appearances at the casino to the racetrack. The program is part of a strategy to mesh horse racing with casino gambling.

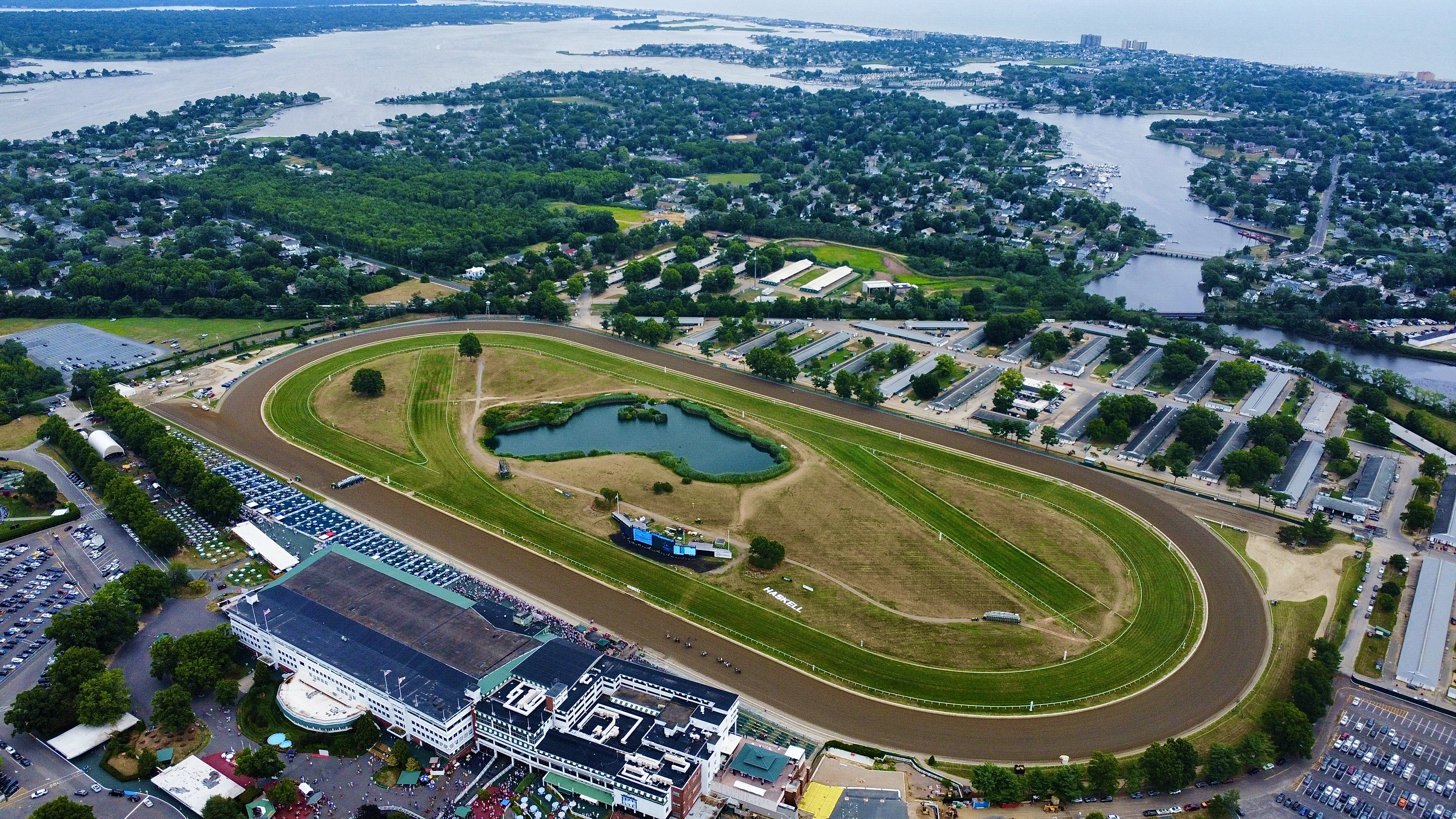
Monmouth Park Racetrack in 2024 on Haskell day.

In April 2013, Monmouth Park opened the Bluegrass Miniature Golf Course near the Port-au-Peck Avenue entrance. The Course features two 18-hole courses, the Haskell Course and the Triple Crown Course featuring each hole named after a different race horse.

In July 2016, the luxury restaurant Blu Grotto, named after the Blue Grotto sea cave on the Italian island of Capri, opened at Monmouth Park. The restaurant is open year-round and is located near the racetrack's quarter-pole. The Beer Garden at Blu Grotto opened in 2017.

On June 14, 2018, the Monmouth Park Sports Book by William Hill sportsbook opened and Monmouth Park became the first location in New Jersey to offer sports betting. Monmouth Park had pushed to legalize sports betting, which was legalized by the U.S. Supreme Court in the case Murphy v. National Collegiate Athletic Association.

On May 16, 2024, Monmouth Park held a ceremonial groundbreaking for a new 16,000 sq ft (1,500 m^{2}) trackside sportsbook operated by Caesars Entertainment. William Hill was acquired by Caesars in 2022 and re-branded the former sportsbook. The new sportsbook officially opened on November 22, 2025, it is located at the track's first quarter-pole and hosts a Shake Shack, self-service betting kiosks and indoor and outdoor seating overlooking the racetrack and the infield.

== Physical attributes ==
The main track is a one-mile (1.6 km) dirt oval with chutes for 6 furlong and 1 1/4 miles (2.0 km) races.

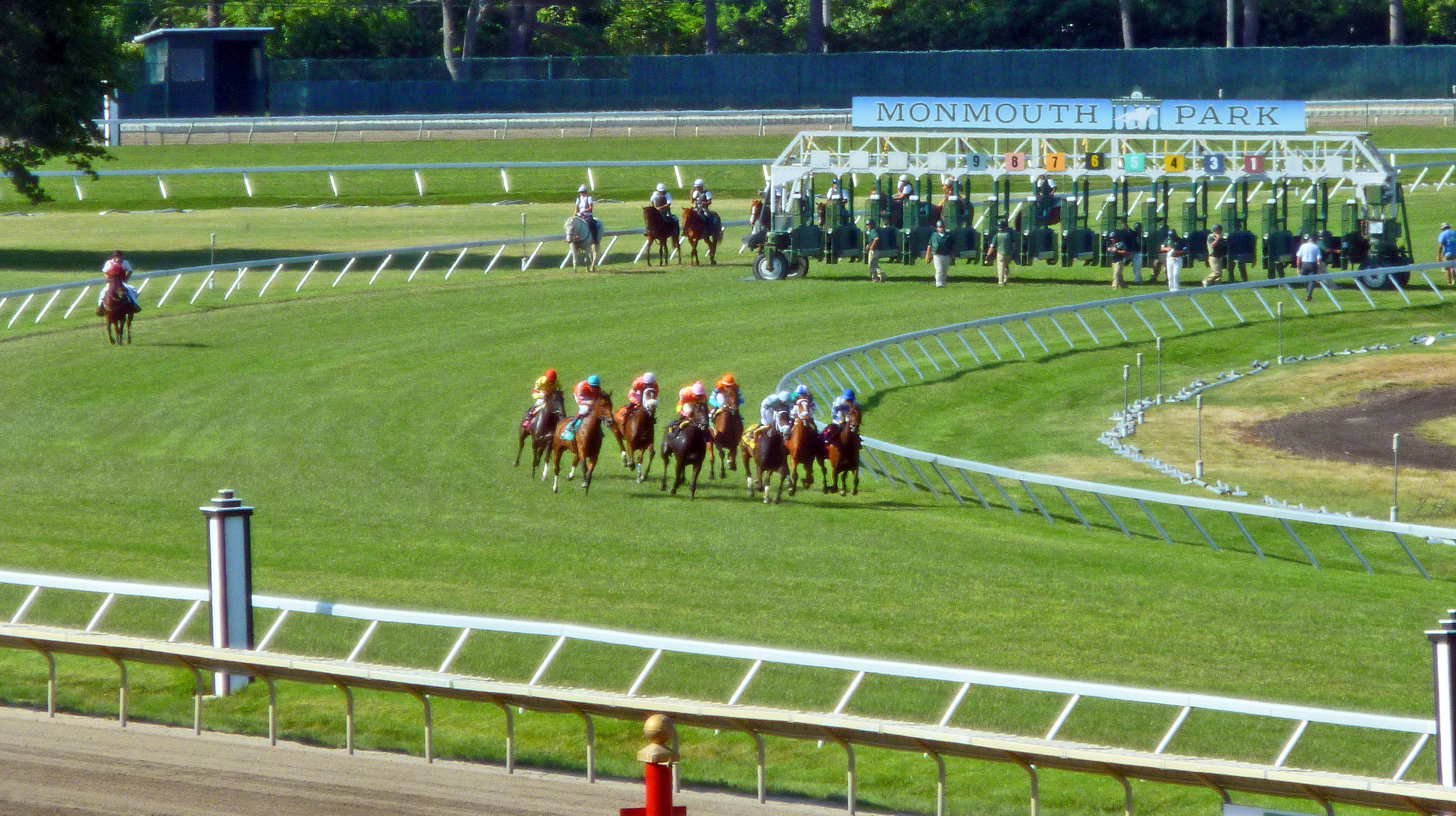
The long infield chute at Monmouth Park leads to the main turf course and allows for races of up to 1 1/8 miles (1.8 km).

The turf course is seven furlongs in circumference, with a diagonal chute for races between 1-mile (1.6 km) and 1 1/8 miles (1.8 km). A re-design of the grass course for the 2006 season brought with it a new, second chute to accommodate 11/16 mi (1.1 km) sprint or rarely 1 9/16 miles (2.5 km) races. Turf races can be run along the hedge, or with the portable rail out 12 ft (3.7 m) (dubbed the "Haskell Course"), 24 ft (7.3 m) ("Monmouth Course") or 36 ft (11 m) ("Lennox Course").

The Stable Area, located directly to the north of the backstretch of the main track, contains a total of forty barns and stables, twelve north of the New Jersey Transit's North Jersey Coast Line (connected by its own service and access road) and twenty eight on the main complex.

The Wolf Hill Farm, which served Monmouth Park as a private stable and practice facility, was located adjacent to and immediately west of the main complex. Wolf Hill, owned and operated by the Valentino Family from the nearby City of Long Branch, New Jersey featured barns, stables and a practice track featuring a dirt oval and turf course identical to that at Monmouth Park's main facility only built to 50% scale. The Valentino Family sold Wolf Hill Farm to the Monmouth Park Jockey Club in 1963 which then became part of the greater Monmouth Park Complex. It was transferred to state ownership in the 1986 takeover by the NJSEA and was eventually sold to the Monmouth County Park System in 1998 which now operates the site as Wolf Hill Recreation Area that features a 4-acre dog park, an 18-hole disc golf course, a baseball field and two softball fields. While Wolf Hill ceased operating as a farm following the 1963 sale, owners and trainers continued to use Wolf Hill's practice track well into the 1990s. Remnants of the practice were clearly visible on the site until after the 2009 meet. After the 2009 meet, construction began in the Wolf Hill area, eliminating the last of the practice track.

== Racing ==
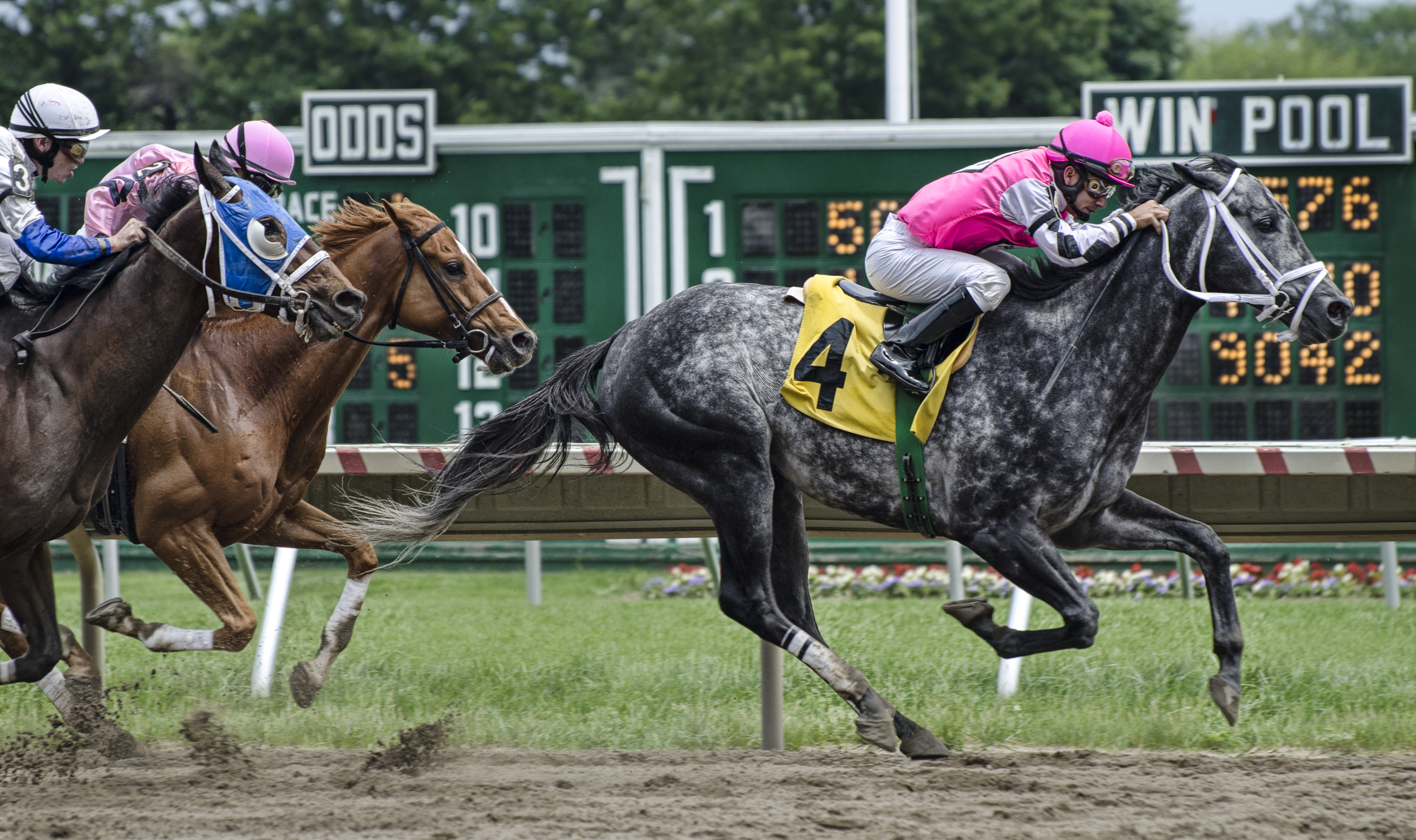
Horse racing at Monmouth Park

- Grade 1:
  - Haskell Invitational Handicap
- Grade 2:
  - United Nations Stakes
- Grade 3:
  - Eatontown Handicap
  - Matchmaker Stakes
  - Molly Pitcher Stakes
  - Monmouth Cup Stakes
  - Monmouth Oaks
  - Oceanport Stakes
  - Philip H. Iselin Stakes
  - Salvator Mile Stakes
- Ungraded stakes
  - Blue Sparkler Stakes
  - Boiling Springs Stakes (Turf)
  - Cliff Hanger Stakes
  - Colleen Stakes
  - Dan Horn Stakes
  - Lady's Secret Stakes
  - Long Branch Stakes
  - Longfellow Stakes
  - Miss Woodford Stakes
  - Monmouth Stakes
  - Jersey Derby
  - Jersey Shore Breeders' Cup Stakes
  - John J. Reilly H. Stakes
  - Lamplighter Stakes
  - Majestic Light Stakes
  - Monmouth Beach Stakes
  - Regret Stakes
  - Mr. Prospector Stakes
  - My Frenchman Stakes
  - Red Bank Stakes
  - Rumson Stakes
  - Sapling Stakes
  - Spruce Fir H. Stakes
  - Tyro Stakes
  - Violet Stakes
  - Wolf Hill Stakes

=== Breeders' Cup World Championships ===
On October 26 and 27, 2007, Monmouth Park hosted the Breeders' Cup for the first time in its history.
The 2007 Event also marked the first time the event has been held over two days and also the creation of three new races held on Day 1 of the Championships.

Winners of Races:
Day 1
Filly & Mare Sprint-Maryfield
Juvenile Turf-Nownownow
Dirt Mile-Corinthian
Day 2
Juvenile Fillies-Indian Blessing
Juvenile-War Pass
Filly & Mare Turf-Lahudood
Sprint-Midnight Lute
Mile-Kip Deville
Distaff-Ginger Punch
Turf-English Channel
Classic-Curlin

The Classic was marred by a fatal injury suffered by George Washington, the 2006 European 3-year-old champion who had returned to training when his stud career was scuttled by fertility problems. He suffered a dislocated fracture of his right front ankle and was euthanized on the track.

=== Million Dollar Meet ===
In March 2010, it was announced that Monmouth Park would shorten its summer meet, conducting only 50 days of live racing (down from 141 total thoroughbred days in the state) for a total of $50 million in purse money for the 2010 meet. This was done due to the recent monetary losses of the racetrack industry in New Jersey and made it the most expensive purse structure in North America at the time.

== TV personalities ==
- Caton Bredar (1995–1998)
- Barbara Foster (1995–1997)
- Jennifer Burke (2000–2004)
- Carolyn Conley
- Brad Thomas (?-present)
- Thomas Cassidy (?-present)
- Larry Collmus (1994–2014)
- Mike Curci
- Matt Dinerman (2024–present)
- Gordon Richards
- Matt Carothers (1998)
- Travis Stone (2014)

== TV and film appearances ==
- The track appears in the 1984 film classic The Pope of Greenwich Village.
- Monmouth Park was featured in a 1986 episode of The Equalizer TV series, entitled "Tip on a Sure Thing."
- Law & Order filmed an episode at Monmouth Park racetrack entitled "Sport of Kings" in 2005.
- The 2010 film The Bounty Hunter starring Jennifer Aniston and Gerard Butler filmed a brief scene at Monmouth Park.
- The track was the filming location for Murr's punishment on the Season 4 episode of Impractical Jokers entitled "Hopeless and Changeless" in 2015.

== Accessibility & transportation ==
The Park is served by the Monmouth Park station on New Jersey Transit's North Jersey Coast Line during the racing season.

A special train called the "Pony Express" was discontinued after the 2005 racing season. This train operated between Hoboken Terminal and the racetrack, terminating on a rail siding near the grandstand entrance. It was often scouted out by railfans due to the variety of equipment that were used on the train in recent years, ranging from the 1970 vintage Pullman Standard Erie Lackawanna Comet I cars to modern Alstom Metro-North Comet Vs.

Monmouth Park is also served by the 831 New Jersey Transit Bus route.

The Park is accessible by car via NJ-36 with connections to the Garden State Parkway, I-195, New Jersey Turnpike (I-95) and other highways and roads. Parking is available in several on site lots.

== See also ==
- Gambling in New Jersey
