= 1974 Preakness Stakes =

99th running of the Preakness Stakes

99th Preakness Stakes
- The Preakness Stakes
- Location: Pimlico Race Course, Baltimore, Maryland, United States
- Date: May 18, 1974
- Winning horse: Little Current
- Jockey: Miguel A. Rivera
- Conditions: Good
- Surface: Dirt

The 1974 Preakness Stakes was the 99th running of the $210,000 Grade 1 Preakness Stakes thoroughbred horse race. The race took place on May 18, 1974, and was televised in the United States on the CBS television network. Little Current, who was jockeyed by Miguel A. Rivera, won the race by seven lengths over runner-up Neopolitan Way. Approximate post time was 5:41 p.m. Eastern Time. The race was run on a track listed as good in a final time of 1:54-3/5. The Maryland Jockey Club reported total attendance of 54,911, this is recorded as second highest on the list of American thoroughbred racing top attended events for North America in 1974.

== Payout ==
The 99th Preakness Stakes Payout Schedule

Program Number	Horse Name	Win	Place	Show
2	Little Current	US$28.20	$15.40	$7.80
9	Neapolitan Way	-	$22.00	$10.00
5	Cannonade	-	-	$4.00

== The full chart ==
Finish Position	Margin (lengths)	Post Position	Horse name	Jockey	Trainer	Owner	Post Time Odds	Purse Earnings
1st	0	2	Little Current	Miguel A. Rivera	Lou Rondinello	Darby Dan Farm	13.10-1	$156,500
2nd	7	11	Neapolitan Way	Herb Hinojosa	Lawrence W. Jennings	Elizabeth F. Thomas	24.20-1	$30,000
3rd	8	6	Cannonade	Ángel Cordero Jr.	Woody Stephens	John M. Olin	2.00-1 favorite	$15,000
4th	83/4	1	Jolly Johu	Ben M. Feliciano	Robert L. Adams	Rolling Ridge Farm	31.20-1	$7,500
5th	9	7	Kin Run	Larry Adams	John Rigione	Vee-Nine Stable	41.50-1	
6th	101/2	12	Heir to the Line	Jacinto Vásquez	Thomas J. Kelly	Craig F. Cullinan Jr.	6.90-1	
7th	103/4	8	J. R.'s Pet	Bill Hartack	Harold Tinker	W. Cal Partee	6.80-1	
8th	111/2	10	Hudson County	Michael Miceli	Stanley Shapoff	R. B. Cohen	9.00-1	
9th	113/4	3	Rube the Great	Braulio Baeza	Frank "Pancho" Martin	Sigmund Sommer	5.70-1	
10th	12	9	Silver Florin	Rick Wilson	Oran Battles	Irene Udouj	9.40-1	
11th	161/4	13	Destroyer	Ismael Valenzuela	Monti S. Sims Sr.	Kenneth Opstein	34.50-1	
12th	181/4	4	All Game	Sandy Hawley	Charles Wahler	Zelda Cohen	15.10-1	
13th	201/4	5	Buck's Bid	Don MacBeth	A. J. (Tony) Bardaro	Bright View Farm	41.50-1	

- Winning Breeder: John W. Galbreath; (KY)
- Winning Time: 1:54 3/5
- Track Condition: Good
- Total Attendance: 54,911
