= 1974 in sports =

1974 in sports describes the year's events in world sport.

== Alpine skiing ==
- Alpine Skiing World Cup
  - Men's overall season champion: Piero Gros, Italy
  - Women's overall season champion: Annemarie Pröll, Austria

== American football ==
- 13 January – Super Bowl VIII: the Miami Dolphins (AFC) won 24–7 over the Minnesota Vikings (NFC)
  - Location: Rice Stadium
  - Attendance: 71,882
  - MVP: Larry Csonka, FB (Miami)
- World Bowl I – Birmingham Americans won 22–21 over Florida Blazers (at Birmingham, Alabama)
- Sugar Bowl (1973 season):
  - The game was actually played on 31 December 1973; other major bowl games were played on 1 January 1974.
  - The Notre Dame Fighting Irish won 24–23 over the Alabama Crimson Tide to win AP Poll national championship
- 1974 NCAA Division I football season:
  - The Oklahoma Sooners win the AP Poll national championship; do not play in any bowl the following January due to sanctions

== Artistic gymnastics ==
- World Artistic Gymnastics Championships –
  - Men's all-around champion: Shigeru Kasamatsu, Japan
  - Women's all-around champion: Ludmilla Tourischeva, USSR
  - Men's team competition champion: Japan
  - Women's team competition champion: USSR

== Association football ==
- Brazil – CR Vasco da Gama wins the Campeonato Brasileiro
- FIFA gives to Colombia the right to host the 1986 FIFA World Cup, but Colombian officials decided in late 1982 that they could not afford to host the tournament on the scale FIFA required.
- Football World Cup – West Germany won 2–1 over the Netherlands.
- England – FA Cup – Liverpool won 3–0 over Newcastle United.
- Ecuador – Ecuadorian Serie A Champions: Liga Deportiva Universitaria de Quito

== Athletics ==
- January – 1974 Commonwealth Games held at Christchurch, New Zealand
- September – East German athlete Manfred Kuschmann wins the 1974 European Championships in Rome

== Australian rules football ==
- Victorian Football League
  - Richmond wins the 78th VFL Premiership (Richmond 18.20 (128) d North Melbourne 13.9 (87))
  - Brownlow Medal awarded to Keith Greig (North Melbourne)

== Baseball ==
- 16 January – Former Yankees teammates Mickey Mantle and Whitey Ford are inducted into the Baseball Hall of Fame. Mantle becomes only the seventh player to make it in his first try. His 536 home runs with the Yankees ranked second only to Babe Ruth and he played in more games (2,401) than any other pinstriper, including Lou Gehrig. Ford was arguably the greatest Yankees pitcher of all time, retiring with more wins (236), more innings (3,171), more strikeouts (1,956), and more shutouts (45) than anyone in club history.
- Frank Robinson becomes the first African-American manager in Major League Baseball.
- 8 April – Hank Aaron hit home run# 715 in the fourth inning off Los Angeles Dodgers pitcher Al Downing breaking Babe Ruth's career home run record.
- 4 June – The Cleveland Indians hosted "Ten Cent Beer Night", but had to forfeit the game to the Texas Rangers due to drunken and unruly fans.
- World Series – Oakland Athletics win 4 games to 1 over the Los Angeles Dodgers.
- 14 October – Shigeo Nagashima, a well known sports player from Japan, retires from the Yomiuri Giants of Tokyo, after a 17-year baseball player career.

== Basketball ==
- NCAA Division I Men's Basketball Championship –
  - North Carolina State wins 76–64 over Marquette
    - In the semifinals of this tournament, North Carolina State defeated UCLA 80–77 in overtime, ending UCLA's record streak of seven national titles. The last previous tournament not won by the Bruins was the 1966 tournament.
- NBA Finals –
  - Boston Celtics win 4 games to 3 over the Milwaukee Bucks
- 1974 ABA Finals –
  - New York Nets defeat Utah Stars, 4 games to 1
- FIBA World Championship
  - USSR World Champion
- 19 January – Notre Dame defeats UCLA 71–70, ending the Bruins' record 88-game winning streak.

== Boxing ==
- 9 February in Paris – Carlos Monzón retains his world Middleweight title by a knockout in round seven over world Welterweight champion José Nápoles.
- 17 to 30 August – First World Amateur Boxing Championships held in Havana, Cuba
- 30 October in Kinshasa, Zaire – Muhammad Ali regained the World Heavyweight title by knocking out George Foreman in the eighth round of what was called The Rumble in the Jungle.

== Canadian football ==
- Grey Cup – Montreal Alouettes won 20–7 over the Edmonton Eskimos
- Vanier Cup – Western Ontario Mustangs won 19–15 over the Toronto Varsity Blues

== Cycling ==
- Giro d'Italia won by Eddy Merckx of Belgium
- Tour de France – Eddy Merckx of Belgium
- UCI Road World Championships – Men's road race – Eddy Merckx of Belgium

== Disc sports ==
- Ken Westerfield and Jim Kenner introduce the first disc freestyle competition and other disc sports to Canada at the Canadian Open Frisbee Championships, in Toronto

== Dog sledding ==
- Iditarod Trail Sled Dog Race Champion –
  - Carl Huntington won with lead dog: Nugget

== Field hockey ==
- Men's European Nations Cup held in Madrid and won by Spain
- Women's World Cup held in Mandelieu, France, and won by the Netherlands

== Figure skating ==
- World Figure Skating Championships –
  - Men's champion: Jan Hoffmann, Germany
  - Ladies' champion: Christine Errath, Germany
  - Pair skating champions: Irina Rodnina & Alexander Zaitsev, Soviet Union
  - Ice dancing champions: Lyudmila Pakhomova & Alexandr Gorshkov, Soviet Union

== Golf ==
Men's professional

- Masters Tournament – Gary Player
- U.S. Open – Hale Irwin
- British Open – Gary Player
- 1974 PGA Championship – Lee Trevino
- PGA Tour money leader – Johnny Miller – $353,022

Men's amateur

- British Amateur – Trevor Homer
- U.S. Amateur – Jerry Pate

Women's professional

- LPGA Championship – Sandra Haynie
- U.S. Women's Open – Sandra Haynie
- LPGA Tour money leader – JoAnne Carner – $87,094

== Harness racing ==
- United States Pacing Triple Crown races –
  1. Cane Pace – Boyden Hanover
  2. Little Brown Jug – Armbro Omaha
  3. Messenger Stakes – Armbro Omaha
- United States Trotting Triple Crown races –
  1. Hambletonian – Christopher T.
  2. Yonkers Trot – Spitfire Hanover
  3. Kentucky Futurity – Way Maker
- Australian Inter Dominion Harness Racing Championship –
  - Pacers: Hondo Grattan

== Horse racing ==
Steeplechases

- Cheltenham Gold Cup – Captain Christy
- Grand National – Red Rum

Flat races

- Australia – Melbourne Cup won by Think Big
- Canada – Queen's Plate won by Amber Herod
- France – Prix de l'Arc de Triomphe won by Allez France
- Ireland – Irish Derby Stakes won by English Prince
- English Triple Crown Races:
  1. 2,000 Guineas Stakes – Nonoalco
  2. The Derby – Snow Knight
  3. St. Leger Stakes – Bustino
- United States Triple Crown Races:
  1. Kentucky Derby – Cannonade
  2. Preakness Stakes – Little Current
  3. Belmont Stakes – Little Current

== Ice hockey ==
- Art Ross Trophy as the NHL's leading scorer during the regular season: Phil Esposito, Boston Bruins
- Hart Memorial Trophy for the NHL's Most Valuable Player: Phil Esposito – Boston Bruins
- Stanley Cup – Philadelphia Flyers win 4 games to 2 over the Boston Bruins
- World Hockey Championship –
  - Men's champion: Soviet Union defeated Czechoslovakia
- Avco World Trophy – Houston Aeros win 4 games to 0 over the Chicago Cougars
- NCAA Men's Ice Hockey Championship – University of Minnesota-Twin Cities Golden Gophers defeat Michigan Technological University Huskies 4–2 in Boston, Massachusetts

== Lacrosse ==
- The 2nd World Lacrosse Championship is held in Melbourne, Australia. The United States win, and there is a 3-way tie for the runner-up position.
- The National Lacrosse League of 1974 and 1975 is formed. It is not related to the modern National Lacrosse League.
- The Rochester Griffens defeat the Philadelphia Wings in the six-game National Lacrosse League (1974–75) championship, 4 to 2 games.
- The New Westminster Salmonbellies win the Mann Cup.
- The Whitby Transporters win the Founders Cup.
- The Peterborough PCO's win the Minto Cup.
- The Johns Hopkins University Bluejays defeat the University of Maryland Terrapins 17–12 to win the NCAA Division I Men's Championship.

== Rugby league ==
- 1974 Great Britain Lions tour
- 1974 Amco Cup
- Captain Morgan Trophy
- 1974 New Zealand rugby league season
- 1974 NSWRFL season
- 1973–74 Northern Rugby Football League season / 1974–75 Northern Rugby Football League season

== Rugby union ==
- 80th Five Nations Championship series is won by Ireland

== Snooker ==
- World Snooker Championship – Ray Reardon beats Graham Miles 22–12

== Tennis ==
- Grand Slam in tennis men's results:
  1. Australian Open – Jimmy Connors
  2. French Open – Björn Borg
  3. Wimbledon championships – Jimmy Connors
  4. U.S. Open – Jimmy Connors
- Grand Slam in tennis women's results:
  1. Australian Open – Evonne Goolagong
  2. French Open – Chris Evert
  3. Wimbledon championships – Chris Evert
  4. US Open – Billie Jean King
- Davis Cup – South Africa wins over India (walkover) in world tennis.
- Last year in which US Open was played on grass courts

== Volleyball ==
- 1974 FIVB Men's World Championship held in Mexico City and won by Poland

== Yacht racing ==
- The New York Yacht Club retains the America's Cup as Courageous defeats Australian challenger Southern Cross, of the Royal Perth Yacht Club, 4 races to 0; it is Australian businessman Alan Bond's first Cup challenge

== Multi-sport events ==
- 1974 Asian Games held in Teheran, Iran
- 1974 British Commonwealth Games held in Christchurch, New Zealand
- Central American and Caribbean Games held in Santo Domingo, Dominican Republic
- International Olympic Committee choose Moscow to host the 1980 Summer Olympics

== Awards ==
- Associated Press Male Athlete of the Year – Muhammad Ali, Boxing
- Associated Press Female Athlete of the Year – Chris Evert, Tennis
- Sports Illustrated Sportsman of the Year - Muhammad Ali, Boxing
