= 1974 Kentucky Derby =

Horse race

100th Kentucky Derby
- Kentucky Derby
- Grade I stakes race
- Location: Churchill Downs
- Date: May 4, 1974
- Winning horse: Cannonade
- Jockey: Angel Cordero Jr.
- Trainer: Woody Stephens
- Owner: John M. Olin
- Conditions: Fast
- Surface: Dirt
- Attendance: 163,628

The 1974 Kentucky Derby was the 100th running of the Kentucky Derby. The race took place on May 4, 1974, with 163,628 people in attendance. The 1974 Kentucky Derby holds the title of the second-largest crowd in the history of U.S. Thoroughbred racing. The 1974 running featured the largest field size in Kentucky Derby history with 23 starters.

== Full results ==
Finished	Post	Horse	Jockey	Trainer	Owner	Time / behind
1st	1	Cannonade	Angel Cordero Jr.	Woody Stephens	John M. Olin	
2nd	19	Hudson County	Mike Miceli	Stanley R. Shapoff	Robert B. Cohen	
3rd	3	Agitate	Bill Shoemaker	James Jimenez	Meeken Stable (John & Paula Kent Meeken)	
4th	5	J. R.'s Pet	Darrel McHargue	Harold Tinker	W. Cal Partee	
5th	6	Little Current	Bobby Ussery	Lou Rondinello	Darby Dan Farm	
6th	8	Destroyer	Ismael Valenzuela	Monti C. Sims	Kenneth Opstein	
7th	11	Buck's Bid	Don MacBeth	Anthony J. Marks	Bright View Farm (John Connelly)	
8th	1A	Judger	Laffit Pincay Jr.	Woody Stephens	Seth W. Hancock	
9th	17	Pat McGroder	Tom Barrow	Mervin Marks	Oxford Stable (Ralph C. Wilson Jr.)	
10th	2B	Rube The Great	Miguel A. Rivera	Frank Martin Sr.	Sigmund Sommer	
11th	10	Sir Tristram	Bill Hartack	Charles G. Milbank	Powhatan Stable	
12th	18	Confederate Yankee	Howard Grant	Jerry Dutton	Merle H. Boyce	
13th	14	Sharp Gary	Earlie Fires	Joseph Diangelo	Edward R. Scharps	
14th	7	Ga Hai	Mike Manganello	Gene Cleveland	Laguna Seca Ranch (Constance H. Bishop)	
15th	16	Crimson Ruler	Kenneth LeBlanc	Carrol J. Matherne	Lee Matherne	
16th	20	Set N' Go	William Gavidia	Manuel J. Azpúrua S.	Antonio Jose Isturiz	
17th	9	Triple Crown	Braulio Baeza	W. Preston King	Samuel Lehrmann	
18th	2	Accipiter	Angel Santiago	Frank Martin Sr.	Sigmund Sommer	
19th	21	Gold and Myrrh	Donald Brumfield	Luis D'Casseries	William F. & James P. Wilmot	
20th	13	Consigliori	Darrell Brown	J. D. Foster	Mr. & Mrs. William C. Jacobs	
21st	15	Bold Clarion	Wayne Chambers	Roger Braugh	Mrs. Roger Braugh	
22nd	12	Lexico	Gustavo Ávila	Marcial Iriza	Mrs. Vincenta deBaptista	
23rd	4	Flip Sal	Eddie Maple	Stephen A. DiMauro	Ben Cohen & Salvatore Tufano	
