= 1982 Kentucky Derby =

Horse race

108th Kentucky Derby
- Kentucky Derby
- Grade I stakes race
- Location: Churchill Downs
- Date: May 1, 1982
- Winning horse: Gato Del Sol
- Jockey: Eddie Delahoussaye
- Trainer: Edwin J. Gregson
- Owner: Arthur B. Hancock III; Leone J. Peters
- Conditions: Fast
- Surface: Dirt
- Attendance: 141,009

The 1982 Kentucky Derby was the 108th running of the Kentucky Derby. The race took place on May 1, 1982, with 141,009 people in attendance.

== Full results ==
Finished	Post	Program	Horse	Jockey	Trainer	Owner	Time / behind
1st	18	11	Gato Del Sol	Eddie Delahoussaye	Edwin J. Gregson	Arthur B. Hancock III & Leone J. Peters	
2nd	8	7	Laser Light	Eddie Maple	Patrick J. Kelly	Live Oak Plantation	
3rd	10	15	Reinvested	Don MacBeth	Stanley M. Hough	Harbor View Farm	
4th	13	1	Water Bank	Marco Castaneda	Ron McAnally	Elmendorf Farm	
5th	11	8	Muttering	Laffit Pincay Jr.	D. Wayne Lukas	Tartan Stable	
6th	14	9	Rockwall	Heriberto Valdivieso	Vincent Clyne	Nelson Bunker Hunt	
7th	7	6	Air Forbes Won	Angel Cordero Jr.	Frank Laboccetta	Edward Anchel	
8th	16	10	Star Gallant	Bill Shoemaker	Leonard Imperio	Buckram Oak Farm (Mahmoud Fustok)	
9th	19	19	Majesty's Prince	Ruben Hernandez	Joseph B. Cantey	John D. Marsh	
10th	1	12	Cupecoy's Joy	Angel Santiago	Alfredo Callejas	Ri-Ma-Ro Stable	
11th	4	3	El Baba	Donald Brumfield	Dewey P. Smith	Dorothy D. Brown	
12th	6	5	Wavering Monarch	Randy Romero	Rusty Arnold	Greathouse Family	
13th	17	1a	Cassaleria	Darrel McHargue	Ron McAnally	20/20 Stable	
14th	5	4	Royal Roberto	Miguel A. Rivera	James H. Iselin	Key West Stable (Mitchell Wolfson Sr.)	
15th	9	14	Music Leader	Pat Day	Tommie Morgan	Glaser-Ellett	
16th	2	2	Bold Style	Jeffrey Fell	Jack Van Berg	Len Mayer	
17th	15	18	Wolfie's Rascal	Jorge Velásquez	Howard M. Tesher	Cohen-Cohen-Kumble	
18th	3	13	New Discovery	Jerry Bailey	Eugene Jacobs	Herbert A. Allen Sr.	
19th	12	16	Real Dare	Richard Guidry	John Mabry	John E. "Boyzie" Jumonville Sr.	
