= James W. Murphy Stakes =

- Class: Listed
- Location: Pimlico Race Course, Baltimore, Maryland, United States
- Inaugurated: 1966
- Race type: Thoroughbred – Flat racing
- Website: www.pimlico.com

Race information
- Distance: 1 mile (8 furlongs)
- Surface: Turf
- Track: Left-handed
- Qualification: Three-year-olds
- Weight: Assigned
- Purse: US$100,000

The James W. Murphy Stakes is an American Thoroughbred horse race run annually at Pimlico Race Course in Baltimore, Maryland. Open to three-year-old horses, it is contested over a distance of one mile on turf.

Beginning with the 2010 race, the Woodlawn Stakes was renamed the James W. Murphy Stakes in honor of the late trainer, James W. Murphy, a stalwart on the Maryland racing circuit. The race is run on the third Saturday of May on the Preakness Stakes undercard. The race was originally named in honor of the Woodlawn Vase. Due to heavy rains, the 2008 edition had to be switched from the turf to 1 1/16 miles on the muddy main track.

The race attracts a different type of horse than the older Dixie Stakes, also run on the turf at Pimlico on that same day. First and most importantly, the Woodlawn is run at one mile, which is considered a sprint on the turf, while the Dixie is run at 1 1/8 miles. Horses from the Woodlawn will typically be candidates for the Breeders' Cup Mile later in the year, while Dixie Stakes horses will typically target the Breeders' Cup Turf. The Woodlawn is also restricted to only horses that are three years old, while the Dixie is for any horse three years old and up.

Artie Schiller in 2004 and English Channel in 2005 are the only Woodlawn Stakes winners to go on and win a Breeders' Cup race.

The Woodlawn Stakes was run as a Handicap race in 1966. The race was taken off the turf and run on the main track in 1967, 1975–1978, 1980, 1981, 1988–1990, 1997, 1998 and 2003. The Woodlawn Stakes was an American Grade III stakes race between 1973 through 1989.

The race was run in two divisions in 1986, 1985, 1981, 1975, 1974, 1973, 1971, 1969 and 1968.

== Records ==
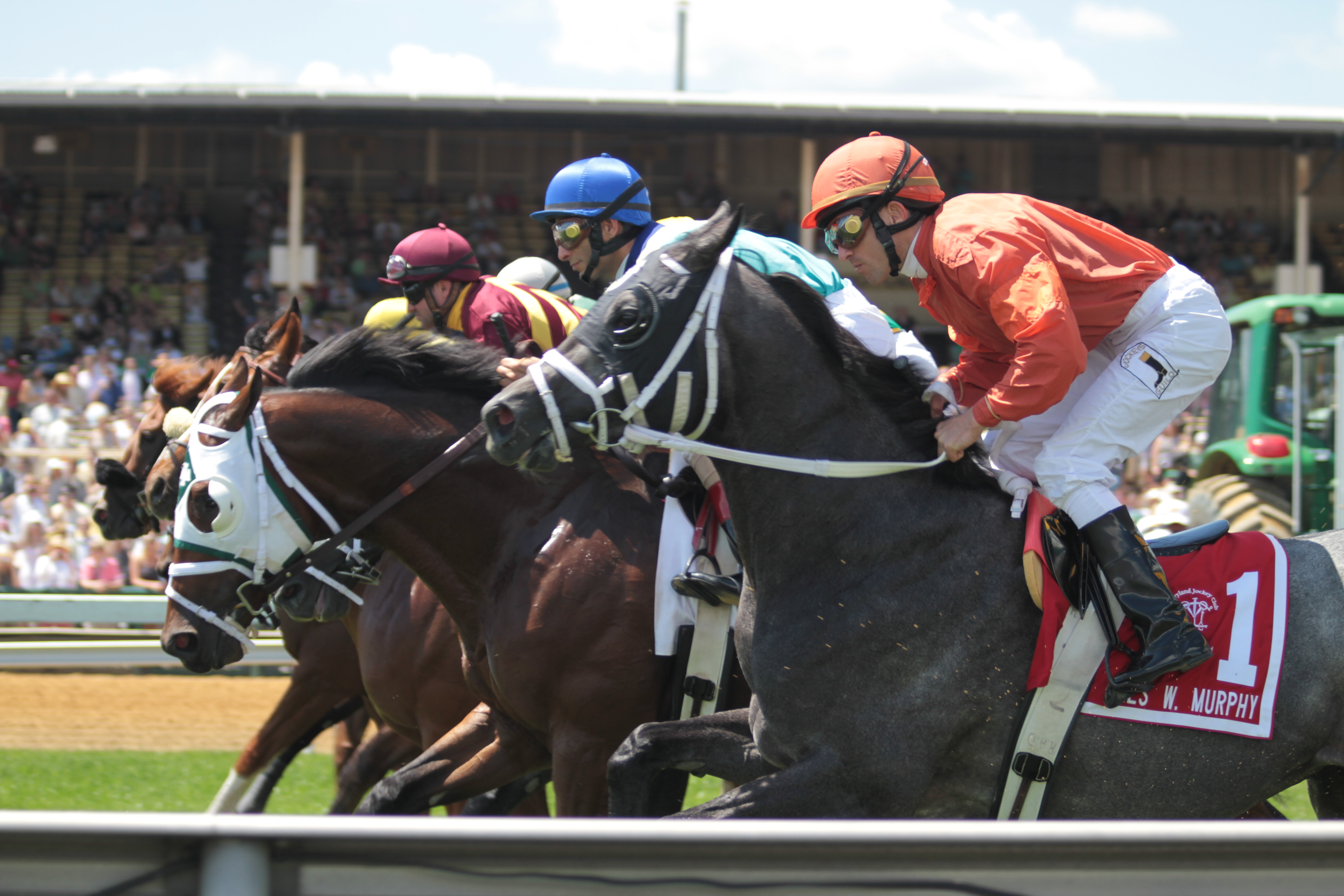
2011 winner Chinglish (third from left) and third-place finisher Master Dunker (foreground).

Speed record:

- 1 mile – 1:34.32 – Woodwin W (2015)
- 1 1/16 miles – 1:43 2/5 – Pulverizing (1989)

Most wins by a jockey:

- 3 – Eldon Nelson (1967, 1970, 1973)
- 3 – William Passmore (1969, 1981 (2×))
- 3 – Vincent Bracciale Jr. (1973, 1980, 1985)
- 3 – Edgar Prado (1993, 1996, 1997)
- 3 – John R. Velazquez (2005, 2009, 2011)
- 3 – Joel Rosario (2012, 2013, 2017)

Most wins by a trainer:

- 3 – Del W. Carroll (1969, 1970, 1980)

Most wins by an owner:

- 2 – Skeedattle Associates (2001 & 2002)
- 2 – Frank E. Power (1969, 1971)

== Winners ==
Year	Winner	Jockey	Trainer	Owner	Distance	Time	Purse
2026	Turf Star	Jorge Ruiz	H. Graham Motion	Calumet Farm	1 mile	1:35.82	$100,000
2025	Reagan’s Wit	José Ortiz	Cherie DeVaux	West Point Thoroughbreds, David Ingordo & CJ Stables	1 mile	1:40.25	$100,000
2024	Fulmineo	Flavien Prat	Arnaud Delacour	Starlight Racing & Mark B. Grier	1 mile	1:44.78	$100,000
2023	Nagirroc	Flavien Prat	H. Graham Motion	Little Red Feather Racing, Madaket Stables & William Strauss	1 mile	1:33.11	$100,000
2022	Joe	Victor R. Carrasco	Michael J. Trombetta	The Elkstone Group	1 mile	1:35.26	$100,000
2021	T D Dance	Javier Castellano	Brad H. Cox	Madakeet Stables, LLC	1 mile	1:34.89	$100,000
2020	Don Juan Kitten	Gabriel Saez	Danny Gargan	Kenneth & Sarah Ramsey	1 mile	1:42.24	$100,000
2019	English Bee	José Ortiz	H. Graham Motion	Calumet Farm	1 mile	1:35.60	$100,000
2018	Tap Daddy	Ricardo Santana Jr.	Steve Asmussen	Winchell Thoroughbreds	1 1/16 mile	1:43.67	$100,000
2017	Yoshida	Joel Rosario	William Mott	WinStar Farm & China Horse	1 mile	1:36.83	$100,000
2016	Marengo Road	Julian Pimentel	Michael Trombetta	Harry & Tom Meyerhoff	1 mile	1:39.04	$100,000
2015	Woodwin W	Jevian Toledo	Jamie Ness	Woody Weeks	1 mile	1:34.32	$100,000
2014	Wallyanna	Javier Castellano	Michael Pino	Tim O'Donahue Racing	1 mile	1:39.09	$100,000
2013	Redwood Kitten	Joel Rosario	Wesley Ward	Kenneth Ramsey	1 mile	1:35.17	$100,000
2012	Skyring	Joel Rosario	D. Wayne Lukas	Bluegrass Hall	1 mile	1:35.64	$100,000
2011	Chinglish	John Velazquez	Mark Hennig	Jerry & Ron Frankel	1 mile	1:40.05	$100,000
2010	Beau Choix	Javier Castellano	Barclay Tagg	Belle Meadows Farm	1 mile	1:34.93	$70,000
2009	Affirmatif	John Velazquez	Todd Pletcher	Wertheimer et Frère	1 mile	1:35.70	$50,000
2008	Termsofengagement	Rosie Napravnik	Nancy Alberts	Chance Romance Rac.	1-1/16	1:45.64	$75,000
2007	Rebel Yeller	Erick Rodriguez	Rodney Jenkins	Centennial Farms	1 mile	1:37.56	$75,000
2006	Rock Lobster	Joseph Rocco Jr.	Michael Dickinson	Flatbird Stable	1-1/16	1:44.06	$100,000
2005	English Channel	John Velazquez	Todd Pletcher	James Scatuorchio	1-1/16	1:45.55	$100,000
2004	Artie Schiller	Richard Migliore	James A. Jerkens	Timber Bay Farm	1-1/16	1:41.86	$100,000
2003	Christmas Away	Ramon Domínguez	Robbie Bailes	Elmon Gray	1-1/16	1:45.73	$100,000
2002	Mr. O'Brien	Pat Day	Michael Dickinson	Skeedattle Associates	1-1/16	1:40.33	$75,000
2001	Unaccountedlea	Mario Pino	Anthony Dutrow	Skeedattle Associates	1-1/16	1:45.73	$75,000
2000	Blaze and Blues	Rick Wilson	H. Graham Motion	Lazy Lane Farms	1-1/16	1:41.20	$75,000
1999	Holditholditholdit	Steve Hamilton	Jeffrey Carle	Rocky Richter	1-1/16	1:42.60	$75,000
1998	Poolman	Joseph Rocco Jr.	Steve Klesaris	Victoria Racing Stables	1-1/16	1:44.20	$75,000
1997	Two Smart	Edgar Prado	H. Graham Motion	Herringswell Stables	1-1/16	1:43.40	$75,000
1996	Allied Forces	Edgar Prado	Kiaran McLaughlin	Stavloi Anavisou	1-1/16	1:42.60	$75,000
1995	Ops Smile	Alberto Delgado	J. William Boniface	Karp Warfield	1-1/16	1:43.20	$75,000
1994	Honorable Flight	Larry C. Reynolds	Dale Capuano	Costas Triantafilos	1-1/16	1:44.20	$75,000
1993	P. J. Higgins	Edgar Prado	Mary E. Eppler	Mary E. Eppler	1-1/16	1:43.80	$75,000
1992	Binary Light	Herb McCauley	Patrick J. Kelly	Live Oak Plantation Racing	1-1/16	1:48.80	$75,000
1991	Link	Jacinto Vásquez	Howard M. Tesher	Stewart Madison	1-1/16	1:42.20	$75,000
1990	Baron de Vaux	Joe Rocco	Charles Peoples	Dormello Stud	1-1/16	1:45.40	$75,000
1989	Pulverizing	Allen T. Stacy	Jerry Robb	Herbert Allen	1-1/16	1:43.40	$100,000
1988	Freezees	Donnie Miller Jr.	James W. Murphy	Jane du Pont Lunger	1-1/16	1:45.20	$66,500
1987	Phantom Jet	Keith K. Allen	Philip A. Gleaves	Mill Creek Farm	1 mile	1:36.00	$66,500
1986	Tropical Whip	Mike Hunter	Marvin Moncrief	Stanley S. Bender et al.	1 mile	1:35.80	$66,500
1986	Fork Union Cadet	Allen T. Stacy	Ferris Allen	David Popofsky	1 mile	1:36.80	$66,500
1985 #	Tent Up	Vincent Bracciale	Howard M. Tesher	Geoffrey A. Huguely	1 mile	1:40.00	$66,500
1985 #	Rappashod	Donnie Miller Jr.	Phil Gleaves	Not Found	1 mile	1:39.20	$66,500
1984	Nagurski	Larry Saumell	Michael J. Doyle	Dogwood Stable	1 mile	1:44.60	$66,500
1983	Disarco's Rib	Julie Krone	Richard Dutrow	Not Found	1 mile	1:39.00	$66,500
1982	Give Me Strength	Jean-Luc Samyn	Luis Barrera	Happy Valley Farm	1 mile	1:39.80	$66,500
1981 #	Thirty Eight Paces	William Passmore	King T. Leatherbury	Double Paces Stable	1-1/16	1:44.40	$66,500
1981 #	Timely Counsel	William Passmore	Not Found	Not Found	1-1/16	1:44.40	$66,500
1980	Blue Ensign	Vincent Bracciale	Del W. Carroll	Locust Hill Farm	1-1/16	1:44.60	$66,500
1979	Smarten	Sam Maple	Woody Stephens	Ryehill Farm	1 mile	1:41.80	$66,500
1978	Iron Legend	Michael Sim	Victor Coladonato	Victor Coladonato	1-1/16	1:44.20	$38,800
1977	Important Reason	Tommy Lee	Not Found	Not Found	1 mile	1:42.00	$31,800
1976	Impeccable	Leroy Moyers	Not Found	Not Found	1-1/16	1:45.20	$31,800
1975 #	Dancing Champ	Chuck Baltazar	Bud Delp	Windfields Farm	1-1/16	1:45.20	$50,000
1975 #	Naturally Bold	Anthony Agnello	Judith Zouck	P. Tiano	1-1/16	1:45.20	$50,000
1974 #	Neapolitan Way	Herb Hinojosa	Lawrence W. Jennings	Elizabeth F. Thomas	1 mile	1:38.00	$50,000
1974 #	Conesaba	Buck Thornburg	W. Burling Cocks	Joy Valentine	1 mile	1:36.80	$50,000
1973 #	Roman Numerals	Vincent Bracciale	Not Found	Not Found	1 mile	1:40.20	$50,000
1973 #	London Company	Eldon Nelson	LeRoy Jolley	Chance Hill Farm	1 mile	1:39.60	$50,000
1972	Dubassoff	Ron Turcotte	Thomas J. Kelly	John M. Schiff	1 mile	1:41.60	$35,500
1971 #	Lord Hussar	George Cusimano	Edward J. Yowell	Harry Frelinghuysen	1 mile	1:37.20	$50,000
1971 #	Bold Statement	William Hartack	Eddie Anspach	Frank E. Power	1 mile	1:38.60	$50,000
1970	Needle's Noose	Eldon Nelson	Del W. Carroll	William S. Farish III	1 mile	1:40.60	$38,100
1969 #	Greengrass Greene	George Cusimano	Del W. Carroll	Michael Grace Phipps	1 mile	1:37.40	$25,300
1969 #	Spring Morn	William Passmore	Eddie Anspach	Frank E. Power	1 mile	1:37.80	$25,300
1968 #	Mara Lark	Robert Wholey Jr.	Pancho Martin	Sigmund Sommer	1 mile	1:37.00	$25,300
1968 #	Hand to Hand	Jorge Velásquez	Not Found	Not Found	1 mile	1:37.60	$25,300
1967	Top Bid	Eldon Nelson	Edward A. Neloy	Gladys Mills Phipps	1-1/16	1:44.00	$31,800
1966	Exhibitionist	Heliodoro Gustines	Hirsch Jacobs	Ethel D. Jacobs	1 mile	1:42.00	$31,800

A # signifies that the race was run in two divisions in 1985, 1981, 1975, 1974, 1973, 1971, 1969 and 1968.

== See also ==
- James W. Murphy Stakes top three finishers
- Pimlico Race Course
- List of graded stakes at Pimlico Race Course
