= Boiling Springs Stakes =

- Class: Grade III
- Location: Monmouth Park Racetrack; Oceanport, New Jersey, United States
- Inaugurated: 1977
- Race type: Thoroughbred – Flat racing
- Website: www.monmouthpark.com

Race information
- Distance: 1 1/8 miles
- Surface: Turf
- Track: Left-handed
- Qualification: Three-year-old fillies
- Weight: Assigned
- Purse: US$100,000

The Boiling Spring Stakes is an American Thoroughbred horse race held annually during the last week of June at Monmouth Park Racetrack in Oceanport, New Jersey. A Grade III event open to three-year-old fillies, it is currently contested on turf over a distance of a mile and an eighth.

Inaugurated in 1977 at Meadowlands Racetrack, the race was moved to Monmouth Park in 2004.

The Boiling Springs Stakes was run in two divisions from 1977 through 1982 and in 1986, 1990, 1995, and 1997.

== Records ==
Speed record:

- 1:39.81 – My Princess Jess (2008)

Most wins by an owner:

- 4 – Darby Dan Farm (1981, 1990 (2), 1991)

Most wins by a jockey:

- 7 – Joe Bravo (1992, 2004, 2007, 2008, 2012, 2015, 2019)

Most wins by a trainer:

- 4 – Chad C. Brown (2015, 2017, 2019, 2024)

== Winners ==
Year	Winner	Jockey	Trainer	Owner	Distance	Time
2025	Sigh No More (IRE)	Axel Concepcion	Brendan P. Walsh	Heider Family Stables	1 1/16 miles	1:42.32
2024	Spaliday	Samy Camacho	Chad C. Brown	Peter M. Brant	1 1/16 miles	1:41.44
2023	Miss New York	Isaac Castillo	Jorge Delgado	Arno Racing	1 mile 70 yards (Dirt)	1:44.07
2022	Green Up	Paco Lopez	Todd Pletcher	Team Valor International	1 mile 70 yards (Dirt)	1:40.93
2021	Por Que No	Ferrin Peterson	J. Kent Sweezey	Fano Racing	1 1/16 miles	1:42.49
2020	no race					
2019	Beautiful Lover	Joe Bravo	Chad C. Brown	Golden Goose Enterprises	1 1/16 miles	1:41.67
2018	Dark Artist	Trevor McCarthy	Jane Cibelli	Goodwood Racing	1 1/16 miles	1:41.81
2017	Lipstick City	Nik Juarez	Chad C. Brown	Steve Laymon	1 1/16 miles	1:45.70
2016	Tin Type Gal	Trevor McCarthy	H. Graham Motion	My Meadowview Farm	1 1/8 miles	1:47.71
2015	Strict Compliance	Joe Bravo	Chad C. Brown	Klaravich Stables/Lawrence	1 1/8 miles	1:46.68
2014	Munirah	Trevor McCarthy	H. Graham Motion	Zanim R. Meahjohn	1 1/8 miles	1:47.51
2013	no race					
2012	Dancing Solo	Joe Bravo	Todd Pletcher	Twin Creeks Racing Stables	1 1/16 miles	1:41.99
2011	Summer Soiree	Gabriel Saez	Graham Motion	Team Valor International	1 1/16 miles	1:42.89
2010	Strike It Rich	Garrett Gomez	Christophe Clement	Waterville Lake Stable	1 1/16 miles	1:40.25
2009	Mary's Follies	Stewart Elliott	John H. Forbes	James Dinan et al.	1 1/16 miles	1:41.21
2008	My Princess Jess	Joe Bravo	Barclay Tagg	Lael Stables	1 1/16 miles	1:39.81
2007	Rutherienne †	Joe Bravo	Christophe Clement	Virginia Kraft Payson	1 1/16 miles	1:40.60
2006	Quite A Bride	Cornelio Velásquez	William I. Mott	Haras Santa Maria de Araras	1 1/16 miles	1:41.37
2005	Toll Taker	Aaron Gryder	Timothy Hills	Sea Gull Associates	1 1/16 miles (Dirt)	1:44.36
2004	Seducers Song	Joe Bravo	Christophe Clement	Peter Karches	1 1/16 miles	1:45.66
2003	no race					
2002	Showlady	Richard Migliore	Kiaran McLaughlin	Sheikh Mohammed	1 1/16 miles	1:42.27
2001	Mystic Lady	Eibar Coa	Mark A. Hennig	Lee Lewis	1 1/16 miles (Dirt)	1:42.63
2000	Storm Dream	Jean-Luc Samyn	Philip G. Johnson	Lael Stables	1 1/16 miles	1:47.09
1999	Wild Heart Dancing	Jorge F. Chavez	Robert Barbara	My Jo Lee Stable	1 1/16 miles	1:43.08
1998	Mysterious Moll	Julio C. Espinoza	Del W. Carroll II	Pont Street Stable	1 1/16 miles	1:40.09
1997	Stoneleigh	José A. Santos	W. Elliott Walden	W. Carl & G. Watts Humphrey Jr.	1 1/16 miles	1:41.13
1997	Victory Chime	Mike E. Smith	Claude R. McGaughey III	H. Joseph Allen	1 1/16 miles	1:41.99
1996	Careless Heiress	Craig Perret	Warren A. Croll Jr.	R. P. Levy, Sibling Stable	1 1/16 miles (Dirt)	1:50.54
1995	Christmas Gift	Herb McCauley	Mark A. Hennig	Edward P. Evans	1 1/16 miles	1:43.49
1995	Class Kris	Rick Wilson	James E. Picou	Fred W. Hooper	1 1/16 miles	1:43.27
1994	Avie's Fancy	José Ferrer	Mark Perlsweig	Gunsmith Stables	1 1/16 miles	1:41.41
1993	Tribulation	Jean-Luc Samyn	James J. Toner	G. Arthur Seelbinder		1:42.70
1992	Captive Miss	Joe Bravo	Philip M. Serpe	Zeke Minassian	1 1/16 miles	1:40.78
1991	Dance O'My Life	Chris Antley	John M. Veitch	Darby Dan Farm	1 1/16 miles	1:41.44
1990	Memories of Pam	Jerry Bailey	John M. Veitch	Darby Dan Farm		1:41.00
1990	Plenty of Grace	Jerry Bailey	John M. Veitch	Darby Dan Farm		1:42.20
1989	Darby Shuffle	Julie Krone	D. Wayne Lukas	H. Joseph Allen		1:40.60
1988	Siggebo	Rick Wilson	John F. Mazza	Daffodil Hill Farm		1:43.20
1987	Rullah Runner	Walter Guerra	William Badgett Jr.	John A. Valentine		1:41.40
1986	Spruce Fir	B. Douglas Thomas	Harry M. Wells	William A. Purdey		1:41.60
1985	Jolly Saint	José A. Santos	Thomas J. Skiffington	Fernwood Stable		1:41.00
1984	Possible Mate	Don MacBeth	Philip G. Johnson	Edward P. Evans		1:41.80
1983	Sabin	Eddie Maple	Woody Stephens	Henryk de Kwiatkowski		1:47.80
1982	Sunny Sparkler	Jean-Luc Samyn	Flint S. Schulhofer	Te Ce Stable		1:41.40
1982	Larida	Eddie Maple	Woody Stephens	Newstead Farm		1:41.40
1981	Irish Joy	Chuck Lopez	Lawrence W. Jennings	Arthur I. Appleton		1:42.40
1981	Wings of Grace	Jorge Velásquez	Lou Rondinello	Darby Dan Farm		1:41.40
1980	Champagne Ginny	Jorge Velásquez	Ray Metcalf	Elkcam Stable		1:42.00
1980	Refinish	Chris McCarron	Laz Barrera	Aaron U. Jones		1:41.60
1979	Jameela	Vincent Bracciale Jr.	Hyman Ravich	Mrs. Richard Worthington Jr.		1:41.60
1979	Gala Regatta	Eddie Maple	W. Burling Cocks	Mr. M. Valentine		1:41.00
1978	Key to the Saga	Jean-Luc Samyn	Stephen A. DiMauro	Buckland Farm		1:41.40
1978	Sisterhood	B. Gonzalez	Laz Barrera	Harbor View Farm		1:41.40
1977	Council House	Craig Perret	P. O'Donnell Lee	Buckland Farm		1:42.40
1977	Critical Cousin	Ángel Cordero Jr.	John W. Russell	Ogden Phipps		1:42.40

- † In 2007, Red Birkin finished first but was disqualified and set back to third for drifting out through the lane.
