= James W. Murphy Stakes top three finishers =

This is a listing of the horses that finished in either first, second, or third place and the number of starters in the James W. Murphy Stakes, an American stakes race for three-year-olds at one mile on the turf held at Pimlico Race Course in Baltimore, Maryland.

Year	Winner	Second	Third	Starters
2026	Turf Star	My Favorite Bird	Attfied	7
2025	Reagan’s Wit	Soleil Volant	Twain	7
2024	Fulmineo	Crystal Quest	Abrumar	9
2023	Nagirroc	Fantastic Again	Circling the Drain	9
2022	Joe	Ready To Perform	Crabs N Beer	8
2021	T D Dance	Arzak	Charles Chrome	8
2020	Don Juan Kitten	Bye Bye Melvin	Reconvene	14
2019	English Bee	Real News	Shootin the Breeze	10
2018	Tap Daddy	Threes over Deuces	Takedown	8
2017	Yoshida	Chubby Star	Mo Maverick	13
2016	Morengo Road	Aquaphobia	Conquest Windycity	9
2015	Woodwin W	Force the Pass	All I Karabout	8
2014	Wallyanna	Open the Bank	Thunder Strike	11
2013	Redwood Kitten	Shining Copper	Notacatbutallama	11
2012	Skyring	Easy Crossing	Mr. Handsome	12
2011	Chinglish	Humble and Hungry	Master Dunker	10
2010	Beau Choix	Manhattan Fox	Cat Park	8
2009	Affirmatif	Lonely Whistle	Hero's Image	n/a
2008	Termsofengagement	M J's Enchanteur	Malibu kid	n/a
2007	Rebel Yeller	Encaustic	Brahms Melody	n/a
2006	Rock Lobster	Extra Blend	Unbridled Behavior	n/a
2005	English Channel	United	Holy Ground	n/a
2004	Artie Schiller	Lipan	Timo	n/a
2003	Gang	Sigint	Breanna's Smile	n/a
2002	Mr. O'Brien	Regal Sanction	February Storm	n/a
2001	Unaccountedlea	Ronnie's Hot Rod	What's Your Wish	n/a
2000	Blaze and Blues	Dixie Run	Lightning Paces	n/a
1999	Holditholditholdit	Pettit's Quest	Hush Itsa Secret	n/a
1998	Poolman	Mister Business	East of Easy	n/a
1997	Two Smart	Fearless Play	De Casperis	n/a
1996	Allied Forces	Optic Nerve	Currency Arbitrage	n/a
1995	Ops Smile	Hold What You Got	Count de Monnaie	n/a
1994	Honorable Flight	Takeitlikeaman	Electric Image	n/a
1993	P. J. Higgins	Raglan Road	Logroller	n/a
1992	Binary Light	Dash for Dotty	Western Miner	n/a
1991	Link	Valley Crossing	Futurist	n/a
1990	Baron de Vaux	Highland Devotion	Libor	n/a
1989	Pulverizing	Ligature	Buck Leader	n/a
1988	Freezees	Russian Diplomacy	Gospel Note	n/a
1987	Phantom Jet	Green Book	Irish Bear	n/a
1986 #	Tropical Whip	Ivybridge	Rock Crystal	n/a
1986 #	Fork Union Cadet	Miracle Wood	Kalli	n/a
1985 #	Tent Up	Knighthood	Chimichanga	n/a
1985 #	Rappashod	Forward Observer	Bea Quality	n/a
1984	Nagurski	D. White	Light Spirits	n/a
1983	Disarco's Rib	Now's the Time	Austin C.	n/a
1982	Give Me Strength	Count Disco	A Magic Spray	n/a
1981 #	Thirty Eight Paces	Michael's Lad	Sanguine Sword	n/a
1981 #	Timely Counsel	Able To	Boston Tea	n/a
1980	Blue Ensign	Knight Landing	Lively King	n/a
1979	Smarten	Durham Ranger	Buck's Chief	n/a
1978	Iron Legend	Horatius	Scotchman	n/a
1977	Important Reason	Counter Punch	Iron Constitution	n/a
1976	Impeccable	End Table	Strawberry Landing	n/a
1975 #	Dancing Champ	Dr's Enjoy Dollars	Galley Ho	n/a
1975 #	Naturally Bold	Talc	Wicked Park	n/a
1974 #	Neapolitan Way	Jato Ribot	Ground Breaker	n/a
1974 #	Conesba	Cast in Bronze	Talkative Turn	n/a
1973 #	Roman Numerals	Bold Nix	Silver Doctor	n/a
1973 #	London Company	Quill's Boy	Shane's Prince	n/a
1972	Dubassoff	Lucky Bidder	The Badger	n/a
1971 #	Lord Hussar	Chateauvira	Warino	n/a
1971 #	Bold Statement	Sense a Fear	Seminole Joe	n/a
1970	Needle's Noose	Oh Fudge	Pass the Drink	n/a
1969 #	Greengrass Greene	Versifier	Native Scout	n/a
1969 #	Spring Morn	Teetotum	Symona II	n/a
1968 #	Mara Lark	Tough Sledding	St. Jude II	n/a
1968 #	Hand to Hand	Go Marching	Sir Beau	n/a
1967	Top Bid	Charles Elliott	Celtic Air	n/a
1966	Exhibitionist	Green Felt	Greek Jab	n/a

A # indicates that the race was run in two divisions. The years in which two divisions were run include: 1986, 1985, 1981, 1975, 1974, 1973, 1971, 1969 and 1968.
