= Gato Del Sol =

American-bred Thoroughbred racehorse

- Sire: Cougar II
- Grandsire: Tale of Two Cities
- Dam: Peacefully
- Damsire: Jacinto
- Sex: Stallion
- Foaled: February 23, 1979
- Died: August 7, 2007 (aged 28)
- Country: United States
- Colour: Gray
- Breeder: Arthur B. Hancock III & Leone J. Peters
- Owner: Arthur B. Hancock III & Leone J. Peters
- Trainer: 1) Edwin J. Gregson; 2) Charles E. Whittingham; 3) Howard M. Tesher
- Record: 39: 7-9-7
- Earnings: $1,340,107

Major wins
- Del Mar Futurity (1981); Cabrillo Handicap (1983); Caballero Handicap (1985) American Classic Race wins: Kentucky Derby (1982)
- Last updated on August 19, 2007

Gato Del Sol (February 23, 1979 – August 7, 2007) was an American Thoroughbred racehorse best known for his win in the 1982 Kentucky Derby.

== Background ==
Gato Del Sol was a gray horse foaled at Stone Farm in Paris, Kentucky. He was sired by the Chilean horse Cougar, who enjoyed his greatest success in North America and was inducted into the U.S. Racing Hall of Fame. His dam Peacefully also produced the Prix Morny winner Tersa and was distantly related to the Melbourne Cup winner Beldale Ball.

Gato Del Sol was owned and bred by Stone Farm proprietor Arthur B. Hancock III in partnership with one of his longtime clients, Manhattan real estate broker Leone J. Peters. The two men also bred Risen Star, winner of the 1988 Preakness and Belmont Stakes. He was trained by Eddie Gregson.

== Racing career ==
=== 1981: two-year-old season ===
Gato Del Sol made his debut at Hollywood Park in 1981 and lost his first two races. In his third start, at Del Mar Racetrack, he won for the first time. After a third-place finish in the Balboa Stakes, he won the Del Mar Futurity.

=== 1982: three-year-old season ===
In his three-year-old campaign, Gato del Sol was winless going into the Kentucky Derby but had been second in the Blue Grass Stakes at Keeneland Race Course.

Given little chance by Churchill Downs bettors against the favored Wood Memorial Stakes winner Air Forbes Won, Gato Del Sol was sent off at odds of 21–1, the third longest in the race. He trailed the nineteen-horse field in the 1¼ mile race early but under jockey Eddie Delahoussaye began making a move after half a mile. By the mile pole, he had moved up to fifth place. He continued to gain ground as the field moved down the homestretch, with six horses spread across the track racing head-to-head. By the final furlong marker, Gato Del Sol had moved to the lead by a half-length and then pulled away to win by 2½ lengths. He paid $44.40 to win, the 10th highest payoff in Derby history.

Following his Derby win, Gato Del Sol's handlers decided to bypass the Preakness Stakes with its shorter distance. Instead, they rested their horse for the 1½ mile Belmont Stakes. Their decision marked the first time in twenty-three years that the Kentucky Derby winner did not try for the Triple Crown. Gato Del Sol finished second in the Belmont Stakes, fourteen lengths behind Henryk de Kwiatkowski's colt, Conquistador Cielo.

Gato Del Sol raced on the New York circuit for the remainder of the 1982 season. After he finished eighth in the Suburban Handicap, his training was taken over by Howard Tesher. Gato Del Sol then won an allowance race at Saratoga Race Course on August 7 as a tuneup for his run in the prestigious Travers Stakes. That year, the entries included each of the winners of the three American Classics. In addition to Derby winner Gato Del Sol, the competition included Preakness Stakes victor Aloma's Ruler and Belmont Stakes winner Conquistador Cielo. However, Canadian outsider Runaway Groom won, becoming the first horse in American racing history to defeat the winners of the three classics in the same race. Gato Del Sol, who finished fifth, came out of the race with an ankle injury that ended his 1982 season.

=== Later career ===
He returned to race on the West Coast in mid-May 1983. He won two of nine starts, including the Cabrillo Handicap at Del Mar Racetrack, then in 1984 was switched to running on turf. He went winless, notably finishing eighth in the 1984 Breeders' Cup Turf. In his fifth year of racing, Gato Del Sol started twice, finishing second in the Shoemaker Breeders' Cup Mile Stakes and winning the 1985 Caballero Handicap at Hollywood Park Racetrack, his career finale.

== Retirement and stud record ==
Retired to stud duty at Stone Farm, Gato Del Sol had little success as a sire. He was eventually sold and in 1993 ended up at a breeding operation in Germany, where he continued to underperform. In 2000, his original co-owner, Arthur Hancock III, and his wife Staci bought Gato Del Sol back in order to eliminate any possibility that he be subjected to the same fate as another American champion, Exceller, who was killed in a Swedish slaughterhouse.

Pensioned, Gato Del Sol spent the remainder of his days on the farm where he was foaled. On August 7, 2007, he was euthanized because of health complications at the age of 28.

== Pedigree ==
Pedigree of Gato Del Sol (USA), gray stallion, 1979
Sire Cougar (CHI) 1966	Tale of Two Cities (GB); 1951	Tehran	Bois Roussel
Sire Cougar (CHI) 1966	Tale of Two Cities (GB); 1951	Tehran	Stafaralla
Sire Cougar (CHI) 1966	Tale of Two Cities (GB); 1951	Merida	Jock
Sire Cougar (CHI) 1966	Tale of Two Cities (GB); 1951	Merida	Torissima
Sire Cougar (CHI) 1966	Cindy Lou (CHI); 1955	Madara	Nearco*
Sire Cougar (CHI) 1966	Cindy Lou (CHI); 1955	Madara	Sun Princess
Sire Cougar (CHI) 1966	Cindy Lou (CHI); 1955	Maria Bonita	Afghan
Sire Cougar (CHI) 1966	Cindy Lou (CHI); 1955	Maria Bonita	Las Palmas
Dam Peacefully (USA) 1973	Jacinto (USA); 1962	Bold Ruler	Nasrullah*
Dam Peacefully (USA) 1973	Jacinto (USA); 1962	Bold Ruler	Miss Disco
Dam Peacefully (USA) 1973	Jacinto (USA); 1962	Cascade	Precipitation
Dam Peacefully (USA) 1973	Jacinto (USA); 1962	Cascade	Marita
Dam Peacefully (USA) 1973	Morning Calm (USA); 1962	Hail To Reason	Turn-To
Dam Peacefully (USA) 1973	Morning Calm (USA); 1962	Hail To Reason	Nothirdchance
Dam Peacefully (USA) 1973	Morning Calm (USA); 1962	Yellow Mist	Hierocles
Dam Peacefully (USA) 1973	Morning Calm (USA); 1962	Yellow Mist	Silver Fog (Family: A1)

* Gato Del Sol is inbred 4S x 5D to the stallion Nearco, meaning that he appears fourth generation on the sire side of his pedigree and fifth generation (via Nasrullah) on the dam side of his pedigree.

== Trivia ==
- Not only was Gato del Sol the first Derby winner for Arthur Hancock III, he was the first Derby winner owned by a member of the famed Hancock family of Claiborne Farm, whose business was primarily breeding. Arthur later won a second Derby title as owner of Sunday Silence.
- Stone Farm is a sponsor of the University of Kentucky Solar Car Team, with Gato Del Sol serving as the namesake for the team's solar-powered cars.
- Gato Del Sol was the partial namesake of Gastr Del Sol; Post Rock outfit headed by Louisville native David Grubbs.
