= Proud Birdie =

American Thoroughbred racehorse

- Sire: Proud Clarion
- Grandsire: Hail To Reason
- Dam: Bernie Bird
- Damsire: Bolero
- Sex: Stallion
- Foaled: 1973
- Country: United States
- Colour: Bay
- Breeder: Diamond C. Farm, Inc.
- Owner: Marablue Farm
- Trainer: 1) Rosemary G. Lepera; 2) James W. Maloney
- Record: 35: 9-3-3
- Earnings: US$324,842

Major wins
- Christmas Day Handicap (1975); Criterium Stakes (1975); Everglades Stakes (1976); Bahamas Stakes (1976); Cabrillo Handicap (1977); Marlboro Cup Invitational Handicap (1977)

Proud Birdie (1973–2003) was an American Thoroughbred racehorse best known for his upset win in the G1 Marlboro Cup Invitational Handicap. Bred in Florida, he was sired by 1967 Kentucky Derby winner Proud Clarion and out of the mare Bernie Bird, a daughter of the speedy Del Mar Derby winner, Bolero.

== Racing career ==
Proud Birdie was purchased for $21,000 by A. Douglas Henderson's Marablue Farm of Reddick, Florida at the 1975 Ocala Breeders' Sales Company auction of two-year-olds in training. Raced by Marablue Farm, Proud Birdie was trained by Rosemary Lepera and then Hall of Fame inductee, James Maloney who said his greatest thrill in racing was Proud Bertie's win in the Marlboro Cup. He raced from age two through five and retired having won nine of his thirty-five starts with earnings of $324,842.

== Stallion career ==
Proud Birdie stood his entire stallion career at Marablue Farm where he sired thirty-three stakes winners including multiple stakes winner, Birdonthewire.

Pensioned in 1998, Proud Birdie was euthanized on May 2, 2003, at age thirty due to complications from the infirmities of old age.
