= Stone Farm =

American horse breeding farm

Coordinates: 38.1231°N 84.1897°W

Stone Farm is an American Thoroughbred horse breeding farm near Paris, Kentucky. It was founded in 1970 by Arthur B. Hancock III, part of the prominent Hancock family of Claiborne Farm fame.

Started as a 100-acre (0.40 km^{2}) tract, Hancock gradually added on until it became a rambling 2,000-acre (8.1 km^{2}) property with over 100 paddocks, with Leone J. Peter's, Cabin, the first stallion to stand at stud.

In its over 30 years of history, Stone Farms has raised more than 100 stakes winners with more than one-third of them graded stakes race winners.

As of 2006, the farm has produced four winners of an Eclipse Award, six American Classic and two Breeders' Cup Classic winners. Some of the operation's famous horses include Sunday Silence, Risen Star, Menifee, Gato Del Sol, Valdez and Fusaichi Pegasus, the 2000 Kentucky Derby champion..

In August, 2007, Gato Del Sol had to be humanely euthanized due to old age. He was 28.
