= Miguel Rivera (jockey) =

Puerto Rican jockey

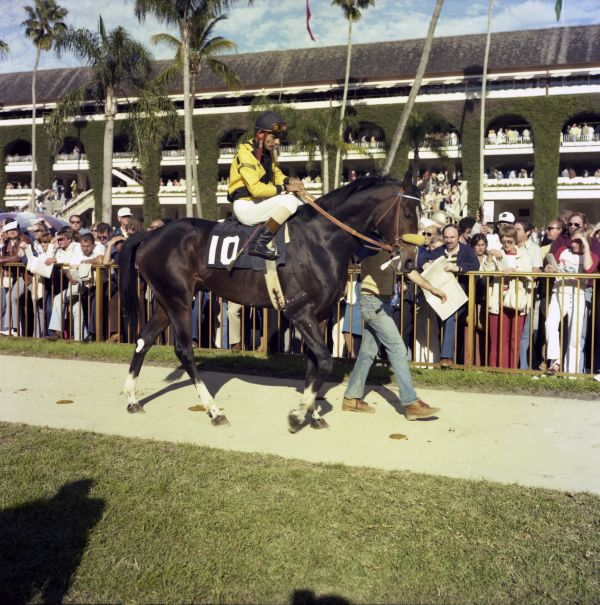
- Rivera with "Kentucky Frenchman" at Hialeah on February 25, 1978

Personal information
- Born: July 8, 1943 (age 83) Rio Piedras, Puerto Rico
- Occupation: Jockey

Horse racing career
- Sport: Horse racing

Major racing wins
- Alligator Handicap (1971); Rancocas Stakes (1972); Haskell Invitational Handicap (1973, 1977); Acorn Stakes (1974), Ohio Derby (1974); Fall Highweight Handicap (1974); Monmouth Handicap (1974); Gotham Stakes (1974) (2); Everglades Stakes (1974); Long Island Handicap (1974); Wood Memorial Stakes (1974); Hibiscus Stakes (1975); Criterium Stakes (1976); Jersey Derby (1976); Meadowland Handicap (1977); Pucker Up Stakes (1977); Melaleuca Stakes (1978); Azalea Handicap (1979); Calder Derby (1979); Carry Back Handicap (1979); Hallandale Handicap (Calder) (1979); Sunny Isle Handicap (1979, 1980); Foolish Pleasure Stakes (1980); Demoiselle Stakes (1982); W. L. McKnight Handicap (1982); My Dear Girl Stakes (1983); What A Pleasure Stakes (1983); Sam F. Davis Stakes (1984); Americana Handicap (1986); Gardenia Stakes (1987) United States Triple Crown race wins: Preakness Stakes (1974); Belmont Stakes (1974)

Racing awards
- Leading Jockey by wins at Hialeah Park (1974)

Honors
- Calder Race Course Hall of Fame (2000); Puerto Rico Sports Hall of Fame (2012)

Significant horses
- Little Current, Our Native, Rube The Great

Miguel Angel Rivera Vargas (born July 8, 1943) is a former Puerto Rican jockey who competed between the 1960s and 1990s. After he went back and forth between Puerto Rico and mainland United States during the 1960s, Rivera moved to the mainland United States during the early 1970s. As part of the Triple Crown of Thoroughbred Racing, Rivera won the 1974 Preakness Stakes and the 1974 Belmont Stakes. In additional Triple Crown races, Rivera's highest finish at the Kentucky Derby was sixth during 1977. For the Filly Triple Crown, Rivera won one of the Acorn Stakes races in 1974.

During the Filly Triple Crown in 1980, Rivera was third in the Mother Goose Stakes and second in the Coaching Club American Oaks. At grade stakes races between 1976 and 1982, Rivera won nine events. Before his final race in 1993, Rivera worked as a horse trainer and returned to horse racing on multiple occasions. During his career, Rivera won over 1,800 events between his races in Puerto Rico and the United States. He became part of the Puerto Rican Equestrian Hall of Fame in 1988 and the Puerto Rico Sports Hall of Fame in 2012.

== Early life ==
Rivera was born on July 8, 1943, in Rio Piedras, Puerto Rico, and lived there with his three siblings and parents. His father, who worked as a greengrocer, died when Rivera was attending high school. After his father's death, Rivera left school and was employed at racetracks alongside his brother. During the early 1960s, Rivera was hired by a printer in New York. After working in deliveries, Rivera left New York for Florida.

== Career ==
In Florida, Rivera continued working with horses when he was employed with Gulfstream Park and Tropical Park Race Track as a hot walker. After he could not find work at Lincoln Downs and Rockingham Park while in New Hampshire, Rivera started his jockey career during 1965 in San Juan, Puerto Rico. During his racing career in the late 1960s, Rivera went back and forth between the United States and Puerto Rico. During this time period, Rivera briefly competed at Fair Grounds Race Course and in New York.

In 1971, jockey Angel Cordero convinced Rivera to go back to the United States. That year, Rivera had multiple suspensions while competing at Gulfstream and Garden State Park. In 1973, Rivera became a stakes race winner. At Hialeah Park, Rivera had the most wins during the 1974 season when he won 38 races. While racing in Saratoga Race Course, Rivera received a suspension in 1974. After the 1978 winter season at Gulfstream, he had won 30 races and was third in the standings. For Calder Race Course, Rivera had set the record for most wins at stake races by November 1979 while he had won 11 races.

=== Stake and triple crown races ===
As a jockey at graded stakes races between 1976 and 1982, Rivera won the first of his three Grade I events at the 1976 Jersey Derby. He later won the 1977 Monmouth Invitational Handicap and the 1982 Demoiselle Stakes as a Grade I racer. In other graded stakes races during this time period, Rivera won four Grade II events and two Grade III events.

As part of the Triple Crown of Thoroughbred Racing, Rivera was in 10th place at the 1974 Kentucky Derby. That year, he won the 1974 Preakness Stakes and the 1974 Belmont Stakes with Little Current as part of the Triple Crown. At additional Belmont Stakes editions, Rivera had a seventh-place finish in 1976. For the Kentucky Derby, Rivera was sixth in 1977 and fourteenth in 1982. In the 1983 Preakness Stakes, Riveria was third with High Honors.

In 1974, Rivera won one of the Acorn Stakes races as part of the Filly Triple Crown. At the Filly Triple Crown in 1980, Rivera was 3rd in the Mother Goose Stakes. That year, Rivera was 2nd during the 1980 edition of the Coaching Club American Oaks when it was part of the Filly Triple Crown during the 1980s. During the 1982 Coaching Club American Oaks, Rivera finished the race in 7th.

=== Returns and additional positions ===
While working as a jockey between 1982 and 1984, Rivera sold appliances and cosmetics. In May 1984, Rivera ended his racing career and planned to start his training experience. He worked as a horse trainer and a canner before he resumed his racing career in July 1984. Rivera was involved in a fight with another jockey during a 1985 event and given a monetary penalty. During the late 1980s, Rivera was a softball player while he continued to race.

In April 1988, Rivera returned to his training career. While he was a trainer, Rivera had an event win in June 1988 before he resumed his racing career that year. After becoming a trainer again in 1989, Rivera returned to his jockey career in 1992. He had his final race as a jockey in 1993 before he went to Calder Racecourse to become a trainer. Rivera continued to work as a trainer until 2008. During this time period, Rivera briefly worked as an owner from 2004 to 2015. Outside of horse racing, Rivera worked for medical and children's organizations.

== Honors and overall performance ==
Rivera and Cordero were selected as recipients of the St. John The Baptist Medal from Puerto Rico after the Triple Crown races in 1974. In 1988, he became part of the Puerto Rican Equestrian Hall of Fame. During 2000, Rivera was to become part of a hall of fame at Calder Race Course. In 2012, Rivera was a Puerto Rico Sports Hall of Fame inductee. In 2019, he was named into the Riopedrense Sports Hall of Fame.

Rivera was the winner of over 420 Puerto Rican races before he competed in the United States. After his final American race in 1993, Rivera accumulated over $14 million in American prize winnings while coming in first at 1,402 events. As a trainer, Rivera's horses had 74 wins and accumulated over $1 million in prize winnings.

== Personal life ==
During his racing career, Rivera nicknamed himself "The Puerto Rican Beauty". Rivera's brother and uncle had previously worked as horse racers before he started in the mid-1960s. He had five children and was married twice.
