= Guy J. Lyon =

American horse trainer

Guy J. Lyon (July 20, 1933 - November 2, 2001) was an American horse trainer in Thoroughbred racing. He trained primarily in New Jersey for more than three decades. Among his stakes race wins were the 1980 Lamplighter and Eatontown Handicaps at Monmouth Park Racetrack.

Lyon was living at Eatontown, New Jersey at the time of his death in 2001.
