= South College =

Private college in Knoxville, Tennessee, US

- Former name: Knoxville Business College (1882–2001)
- Type: Private for-profit university
- Established: 1882; 144 years ago
- Accreditation: SACSCOC
- Chancellor: Stephen A. South
- Provost: Danielle Kwasnik (chief academic officer)
- Students: 20,000 (2025)
- Location: Knoxville, Tennessee, United States; 35°57′29.6526″N 83°58′32.8542″W
- Campus: Multiple campuses: Knoxville (2 locations), Nashville, Asheville, Atlanta, Marietta, Indianapolis, Orlando, Pittsburgh, and Dallas; plus online
- Website: south.edu

South College is a private for-profit institution with its main campus in Knoxville, Tennessee. The college offers approximately 100 programs, from certificate programs to degree programs at the associate, bachelor's, master's, educational specialist, and doctoral levels.

It was founded as Knoxville Business College in 1882, acquired by Stephen A. South in 1989, and renamed South College in 2001.

== History ==
Knoxville Business College was founded in 1882. It was acquired by Stephen A. South in 1989, obtained accreditation from the Southern Association of Colleges and Schools Commission on Colleges in 2000, and changed its name to South College in 2001. In 2003, students at South College became eligible for the Tennessee Hope Scholarship. It began construction of its main Knoxville campus in February 2005.

Originally a branch of Nashville Business College, Knoxville Business College was founded in 1882 by Jacob T. Johnson in the downtown business district of Knoxville. It was acquired by Stephen A. South in 1989, obtained accreditation from the Southern Association of Colleges and Schools Commission on Colleges in 2000 and changed its name to South College in 2001. The college began its first master's level program, the Master of Health Science in Physician Assistant Studies, in 2007. The college's student population reached approximately 1,000 students in 2009.

In 2003, students at South College became eligible to participate in the Tennessee HOPE Scholarship. In 2007, the college began its first master's level program, the Master of Health Science in Physician Assistant Studies program.

South College's Doctor of Pharmacy program, its first doctoral degree program, launched in 2012.

In 2015, the college launched a hybrid Doctor of Physical Therapy program. The same year, students became eligible to participate in the Tennessee Promise scholarship program and the associated South College Opportunity Grant was established.

In 2016, the merger for the South College Asheville campus was completed, and in 2017 the South College Nashville campus was established. The school launched its South College Promise and Military grants in 2017. In 2018, the Online Operations Center in Pittsburgh and the Atlanta campus were both established. When Fountainhead College of Technology closed mid-semester in November 2018, South College allowed its students to finish their programs at its campuses in Knoxville. The school also hired four Fountainhead faculty members needed to teach the courses.

The Indianapolis and Orlando campuses opened in 2021. In 2022, South College opened a new campus in Pittsburgh. The same year, it began self-paced Competency-Based Education programs, offering master's or doctoral degrees in business, education, and religious ministry. South College Asheville announced 100 percent of its nursing students passed their licensure exam for the prior two years in 2024. The school started a competency based Doctor of Nursing Practice program in 2025. The Dallas, Texas campus opened October 2025.

In 2025, enrollment at South College reached 20,000 students.

== Campuses ==
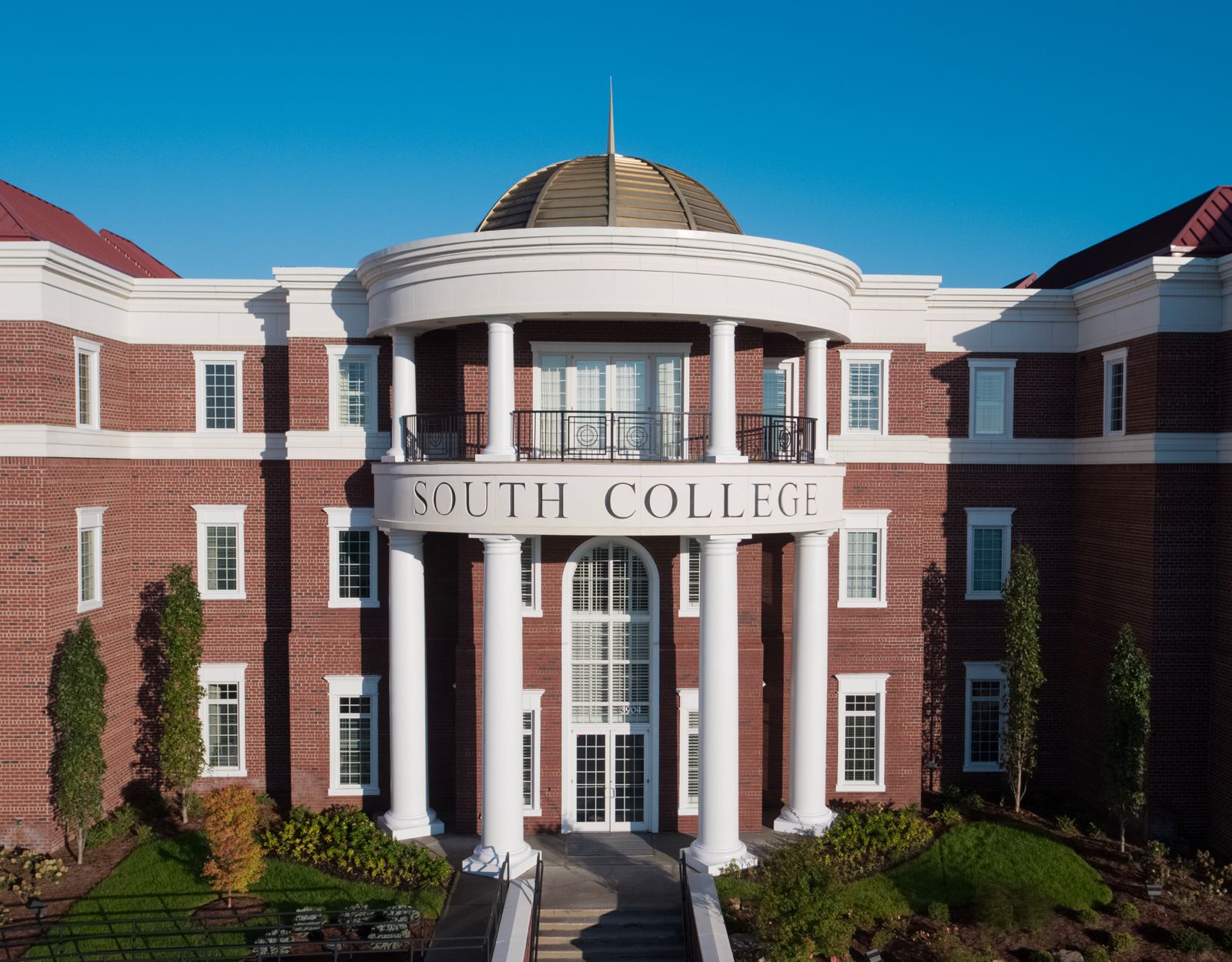
Entranceway to South College Lonas Campus

- Knoxville, Tennessee (2 locations)
- Asheville, North Carolina
- Nashville, Tennessee
- Atlanta, Georgia
- Indianapolis, Indiana
- Orlando, Florida
- Dallas, Texas
- Pittsburgh, Pennsylvania
- Marietta, Georgia
- Online – Online Operations Center

== Academics ==
South College offers certificate, associate, bachelor's, master's, educational specialist, and doctoral degree programs. It had more than 100 programs as of 2025, including in health care, business administration, criminal justice, and education, among others. Programs may be online, in-person, or a hybrid. The school employed 1,303 faculty members in fall 2023, of whom 384 were full-time. The student-faculty ratio was 23 to 1 that year. Campus locations are small, with class sizes ranging from 20-50 students.

South College is accredited by the Southern Association of Colleges and Schools Commission on Colleges. South College can award degrees at the doctoral, master's, baccalaureate, and associate levels.

== Student body ==
South College Knoxville had a fall 2023 enrollment of 8,234 total students, 6,406 of whom were undergraduates. Approximately 89 percent of undergraduates identified as female and approximately 78 percent of students were full-time.

As of December 2025, South College had over 20,000 enrolled students and over 3,000 employees across campuses.

== Notable alumni ==
- Seth W. Hancock, horse breeder
- Zach Payne, politician
