= Leone J. Peters =

- Born: September 16, 1911; Portsmouth, New Hampshire, U.S.
- Died: June 4, 1988 (aged 76); Philadelphia, Pennsylvania, U.S.
- Occupations: Real estate executive Thoroughbred racehorse owner-breeder
- Spouse: Betty Martone
- Children: Son: Paul Leone Peters; Daughter: Gail Peters Beitz

Leone J. Peters (September 16, 1911 – June 4, 1988) was an American businessman and an owner-breeder of Thoroughbred racehorses.

== Real Estate ==
Peters, a prominent Manhattan real estate broker and consultant, was the archetype of the modern commercial real estate broker. He joined the property management company Cushman & Wakefield in 1929 as a bookkeeper. With the exception of World War II military service, where he enlisted as a buck private and achieved the rank of captain, he spent his entire business career at the firm, remaining an active broker until his death. He rose to the position of president and chief executive officer of Cushman & Wakefield in 1960, became chairman of the board of directors and its chief executive officer in 1970, and honorary chairman in 1976, closing many of the industry's most notable transactions along the way. He oversaw an expansion of the business into a nationwide force and was credited with transforming Cushman & Wakefield from a family-owned building management concern into a leading real estate services organization. As agent or consultant, Peters represented almost every major investment builder, as well as many large institutional owners in the industrial, banking and insurance fields around the U.S. and abroad. He was also instrumental in the development of several of America's most prominent office towers, including the Bank of America Building in San Francisco, Arco Towers in Los Angeles, and 4 New York Plaza, among many others.

== Thoroughbred horse racing ==
An avid horseman, Leone J. Peters partnered with Arthur B. Hancock III, of the renowned Kentucky breeding operation, Claiborne Farm. At Hancock's Stone Farm in Paris, Kentucky they bred and raced Gato Del Sol, winner of the 1982 Kentucky Derby. Among other horses the two bred were multiple stakes race winner Tap Shoes and Risen Star, winner of the 1988 Preakness and Belmont Stakes who was voted the Eclipse Award for Outstanding 3-Year-Old Male Horse.

== Other activities ==
Peters was active in many civic organizations, serving as a patron of the New York Metropolitan Opera, a director of Tiro A Segno and the Columbus Citizens Committee, and a member of the board of the Real Estate Council for Lincoln Center. He supported many charitable organizations and institutions, including the Chemotherapy Foundation of New York, the American Cancer Society, the Boy Scouts of America, Skidmore College, Lehigh University, and the University of Pennsylvania. Leone J. Peters died at the Hospital of the University of Pennsylvania in Philadelphia in 1988 following open-heart surgery.

He was married to the former Betty Martone (1914–1998) with whom he had a son, Paul Leone Peters (1946-), also in the real estate business, and a daughter who also became involved Thoroughbred racing, Gail Peters Beitz. He is survived as well by four grandsons: Adam Paul Peters, Jaime Martone Peters, Jonathan Bradley Beitz, and Drew Travers Beitz.
