= Neapolitan Way =

American-bred Thoroughbred racehorse

- Sire: Barbizon
- Grandsire: Polynesian
- Dam: Bold Majesty
- Damsire: Bold Ruler
- Sex: Stallion
- Foaled: 1971
- Country: United States
- Color: Chestnut
- Breeder: Warner L. Jones, Jr.
- Owner: Elizabeth F. Thomas & Mrs. Henry Obre
- Trainer: Lawrence W. Jennings
- Record: 84: 14-12-10
- Earnings: US$149,043

Major wins
- Woodlawn Stakes (1974)

Neapolitan Way (Foaled January 27, 1971) was an American Thoroughbred racehorse. A son of Barbizon and a grandson to Polynesian, he was out of a Bold Ruler mare named Bold Majesty. Neapolitan Way is best remembered for placing second in the second jewel of the American Triple Crown, the $250,000 grade 1 Preakness Stakes, to Little Current.

== Racing career ==
Neapolitan Way's race history is very sketchy and vague, but he won 14 races during his career. It is also known that he placed in the top three finishers in 43% of his starts, a total of 36 out 84 in-the-money races. At age two, he finished third in the Miami Beach Handicap at Calder Race Course. At age three, he won the grade three Woodlawn Stakes (now renamed the James W. Murphy Stakes) at a mile on the turf at Pimlico Race Course and placed third in the Japan Racing Association Stakes at Laurel Park Racecourse. At age four, he placed third in the grade two Dixie Stakes at Pimlico.

== Preakness Stakes ==
In mid May 1974, Neapolitan Way's trainer Lawrence W. Jennings decided to take a step up in class and run him in the second jewel of the Triple Crown. The Preakness Stakes is run at a mile and three sixteenths on dirt at Pimlico Race Course in Baltimore, Maryland. Neapolitan Way was listed as one of the longest shots on the board at 24-1 on the morning line in a field of thirteen colts. The prohibitive favorite was the Kentucky Derby winner, Cannonade, at 2-1. Neapolitan Way broke slowly in tenth place out of thirteen and was outrun early under jockey Herb Hinojosa. Going into Pimlico's famous "Clubhouse Turn," he fell further back into dead last. The fractions were moderate on the front end, with the first quarter in :231/5 and the half in :47 seconds. Going into the final turn, Neapolitan Way lugged in and collided with Hudson County, causing a severe cut high on his left rear leg. After the move inward, Hinojosa applied steady left handed whipping, straightening Neapolitan Way out at the top of the stretch. In the lane, he moved up quickly from 13th to 11th to 7th and then hit another gear. He started picking off horses, including Cannonade. In deep stretch, he moved into second place but was no threat to the winner, Little Current, who finished between seven and 21 lengths in front of the rest of the field. Cannonade finished one length behind Neapolitan Way in third with Jolly Johu three quarters of a length back in fourth. Neapolitan Way took home the 20% runner-up's share of the purse, equalling $30,000.
