= Cabrillo Handicap =

Horse race in Del Mar, California, US

- Class: Discontinued Grade 3 stakes
- Location: Del Mar Racetrack, Del Mar, California
- Inaugurated: 1966
- Race type: Thoroughbred - Flat racing

Race information
- Distance: 1 1/8 miles (9 furlongs)
- Surface: Dirt
- Track: left-handed
- Qualification: Three-year-olds and up
- Purse: $300,000

The Cabrillo Handicap was an American Thoroughbred horse race run annually at Del Mar Racetrack in Del Mar, California, from 1966 through 1990. Open to horses age three and older, the Grade 3 event was raced on dirt. Contested at various distances, in its final years it was set at a mile and one-eighth (nine furlongs)

The race was won by such top horses as Cougar II, Kennedy Road, Proud Birdie, Gato Del Sol, Ferdinand, and Precisionist.

The Cabrillo Handicap was run in two divisions in 1966.

== Winners ==
- 1990 - Miserden
- 1989 - Lively One
- 1988 - Precisionist
- 1987 - Ferdinand
- 1986 - Hopeful Word
- 1985 - Last Command
- 1984 - Video Kid
- 1983 - Gato Del Sol
- 1982 - Caterman
- 1981 - Tahitian King
- 1980 - Teddy Doon
- 1979 - Quick Turnover
- 1978 - Vic's Magic
- 1977 - Proud Birdie
- 1976 - Branford Court
- 1975 - Against The Snow
- 1974 - War Heim
- 1973 - Kennedy Road
- 1972 - Imaginative
- 1971 - Kobuk King
- 1970 - Cougar II
- 1969 - Balsamo
- 1968 - Pinjara
- 1967 - Bern Book
- 1966 - Adopted
- 1966 - Old Mose
