= Edwin J. Gregson =

American Thoroughbred racehorse trainer (1938–2000)

Personal information
- Born: August 7, 1938 Los Angeles, California, United States
- Died: June 4, 2000 (aged 61) South Pasadena, California, United States
- Occupation: Trainer

Horse racing career
- Sport: Horse racing

Major racing wins
- Santa Ana Handicap (1978); Santa Barbara Handicap (1978); Beverly Hills Handicap (1979); Clement L. Hirsch Stakes (1980); Del Mar Futurity (1981); Monrovia Handicap (1982); Del Mar Derby (1984); Morvich Handicap (1984); Carleton F. Burke Handicap (1985); Autumn Days Handicap (1985); Eddie Read Handicap (1985); San Diego Handicap (1985, 1987); Silver Belles Handicap (1985); Apple Blossom Handicap (1986); Goodwood Handicap (1986); Santa Maria Stakes (1986); Silver Screen Handicap (1987); Yankee Valor Handicap (1987); San Pasqual Handicap (1988); El Conejo Handicap (1989); Hollywood Gold Cup (1989); Sunset Handicap (1989, 1990, 1996); Palos Verdes Handicap (1989); San Antonio Handicap (1989); San Marcos Handicap (1989); San Simeon Handicap (1989); Del Mar Oaks (1990); Toboggan Handicap (1990); Yerba Buena Handicap (1990); Del Mar Handicap (1995); Hollywood Turf Cup Stakes (1995); Wickerr Handicap (1995); San Gorgonio Handicap (2000); Santa Ynez Stakes (2000); U.S. Triple Crown wins: Kentucky Derby (1982)

Honours
- Edwin J. Gregson Foundation

Significant horses
- Gato Del Sol, Petite Ile, Super Diamond

Edwin Janss Gregson (August 7, 1938 – June 4, 2000) was an American Thoroughbred racehorse trainer. He was the trainer of Gato Del Sol who won the 1982 Kentucky Derby.

== Personal life and education ==
Edwin's father George Gregson, from Bisbee, Arizona, worked for Janss Investment Company. He met Patricia Cluff Janss there and they married. Gregson was born in Los Angeles and grew up in Holmby Hills. His uncle Edwin Janss Jr. was a real estate developer. His grandfather owned the 10,000 acre Janss Conejo Ranch. He had a sister, Patricia. Gregson attended Stanford University to study pre-law but left after two years to become an actor in New York, including a small part in The Naked and the Dead.

He married actress May Britt in Tijuana, Mexico on February 22, 1958. They separated in September 1959 and divorced. He then finished his Stanford degree in European history.

Before he died, he was living in Pasadena and married to Gail, a show jumper and racehorse rehabilitator, who he wed in 1968 and with whom he had twin daughters in 1970.

He died on June 4, 2000, of a self-inflicted gunshot wound. In his honor, a charitable institution founded by the association of California Thoroughbred Trainers (CTT) designed to "enhance the quality of life of California's backstretch workers and their families" was renamed the Edwin J. Gregson Foundation.

== Career ==
After graduating he worked as a cowboy and a groom, before becoming a racehorse trainer. He was president of the California Thoroughbred Trainers Association and the secretary and a director of the California Thoroughbred Breeders Association.

== Edwin J. Gregson Foundation ==
Edwin J. Gregson Foundation
- Formation: 1998
- Type: Foundation (nonprofit)
- Headquarters: Arcadia, CA, United States
- President: Jenine Sahadi
- Revenue: $408,512 (2017)
- Expenses: $211,879 (2017)
- Website: gregsonfoundation.com

The Edwin J. Gregson Foundation, Inc. is a nonprofit foundation in the American Thoroughbred horse racing industry based in Arcadia, California. Its stated objective is to "enhance the quality of life of California's backstretch workers and their families." Founded in 1998, in 2000 it was renamed to honor the memory of trainer and former CTT president, Edwin J. "Eddie" Gregson, who was the first to advocate the creation of the Foundation.

Among its functions, the Foundation provides College Scholarships to the children of backstretch workers.

Since July 2001, trainer Jenine Sahadi has been President of the Foundation.
