= Lamplighter Stakes =

- Class: Non-graded stakes
- Location: Monmouth Park Racetrack; Oceanport, New Jersey, United States
- Inaugurated: 1946
- Race type: Thoroughbred – Flat racing
- Website: www.monmouthpark

Race information
- Distance: 1 1/16 miles (8.5 furlongs)
- Surface: Turf
- Track: Left-handed
- Qualification: Three-years-old
- Weight: Assigned
- Purse: US$60,000

The Lamplighter Stakes is an American Thoroughbred horse race run annually during the last week of May at Monmouth Park Racetrack in Oceanport, New Jersey. Open to three-year-old horses, it is contested on turf over a distance of 1 1/16 miles (8.5 furlongs).

Inaugurated in 1946 as the Lamplighter Handicap, the race was named to honor Lamplighter, the 1893 American Co-Champion Older Male Horse owned by prominent horseman Pierre Lorillard IV who had been a co-owner of the Monmouth Park Association's racetrack.

Since its inception, the race has been contested at various distances on both dirt and turf:

- 1 1/16 miles on dirt : 1946–1970, 1972, 1974, 1984,1987
- 1 1/8 miles on turf : 1971
- 1 1/16 miles on turf : 1973, 1975–1983, 1985–1986, 1988–2004, 2007–present
- 1 mile on turf : 2005, 2006

On July 1, 1978, the legendary U.S. Racing Hall of Fame inductee, John Henry, made his turf stakes debut with a third-place finish in the second division of the Lamplighter.

== Records ==
Speed record:

- 1:40.52 – Lendell Ray (2000)

Most wins by an owner:

- 2 – George D. Widener Jr. (1950, 1965)
- 2 – James Cox Brady Jr. (1953, 1954)
- 2 – Calumet Farm (1961, 1971)

Most wins by a jockey:

- 5 – Craig Perret (1975, 1976, 1986, 1987, 1988)

Most wins by a trainer:

- 4 – William I. Mott (1993, 1995, 2000, 2003)

== Winners ==
Year	Winner	Jockey	Trainer	Owner	Time
2017	Mo Maverick	Eddie Castro	George R. Weaver	R. A. Hill Stable & Gatsas Stables	1:42.80
2016	Franklin Towers	Nik Juarez	Jane Cibelli	Clarke Ohrstrom	1:40.80
2015	Nonna's Boy	Christopher DeCarlo	Todd Pletcher	Repole Stable	1:41.11
2013	– 2014	Race not held			
2012	Malibu Way	Joe Bravo	Christophe Clement	Lael Stables (Roy & Gretchen Jackson)	1:42.27
2011	Crimson China	Alan Garcia	H. Graham Motion	Team Valor International	1:40.73
2010	Thunder Brew	Carlos Marquez Jr.	Anthony Pecoraro	Roman Hill Farm LLC (Thomas L. Croley)	1:40.54
2009	Sleepless Knight	Joe Bravo	Kelly J. Breen	George & Lori Hall	1:41.39
2008	El Sultry Sun	Eddie Castro	John C. Kimmel	Live Oak Racing	1:41.01
2007	Top Cross	Chris DeCarlo	Todd A. Pletcher	Wertheimer et Frère	1:41.15
2006	Smart Enough	Joe Bravo	John R. S. Fisher	Erdenheim Farm	1:33.75
2005	Network	Javier Castellano	Edwin T. Broome	Edwin T. Broome	1:35.96
2004	Gotaghostofachance	Stewart Elliott	Edward T. Allard	Phillip J. Torsney	1:40.82
2003	Stroll	Jerry D. Bailey	William I. Mott	Claiborne Farm	1:40.09
2002	Entitlement	Pat Day	John K. Hennig	Brereton C. Jones	1:45.07
2001	First Spear	Joe Bravo	Todd A. Pletcher	Peachtree Stable (John P. Fort)	1:41.94
2000	Lendell Ray	Aaron Gryder	William I. Mott	Dave Eigel/Kenneth Glass	1:40.52
1999	Phi Beta Doc	Ramon Domínguez	Robert W. Leonard	Robert W. Leonard/Dennis Foster	1:45.00
1998	Soldier Field	Rick Wilson	Linda L. Rice	David Sepler	1:43.20
1997	Statesmanship	Herb McCauley	Christophe Clement	Peter F. Karches	1:42.00
1996	Allied Forces	Richard Migliore	Kiaran McLaughlin	Ahmed Al Tayer	1:42.00
1995	Claudius	Herb McCauley	William I. Mott	Darley Racing	1:41.00
1994	Mr. Impatience	Chuck Lopez	Dennis J. Manning	Southview Farm	1:42.20
1993	Namaqualand	Mike E. Smith	William I. Mott	Sheikh Mohammed	1:43.00
1992	Smilin and Dancin	Richard Migliore	Stephen L. DiMauro	Flanna Stable	1:41.20
1991	Futurist	Rick Wilson	John R. S. Fisher	Richard L. Gelb	1:41.40
1990	Groscar	Rick Wilson	Robert E. Reid Jr.	S. M. Baer	1:41.20
1989	Expensive Decision	Jean-Luc Samyn	Stanley Shapoff	E. L. Shapoff	1:41.20
1988	Mi Selecto	Craig Perret	Eduardo Azpurua	Wilfredo Agusti	1:42.40
1987	Clever Secret	Craig Perret	D. Wayne Lukas	Eugene V. Klein	1:42.40
1986	One Magic Moment	Craig Perret	Joseph Pierce Jr.	Richard D. Irwin	1:44.40
1985	Crazy Life	Chris Antley	Ronnie Warren	S. & T. Adams	1:44.00
1984	Light Spirits	Chris Antley	Charles Hadry	Locust Hill Farm	1:44.40
1983	Tough Mickey	Jean-Luc Samyn	Philip G. Johnson	Michelina Napolitano	1:42.60
1982	Majesty's Prince	William Nemeti	Joseph B. Cantey	John D. Marsh	1:49.80
1981	McCann	David Ashcroft	Frank A. Alexander	Dogwood Stable	1:45.00
1980	Ghazwan	Ramon Encinas	Roger Wojtowiez	Buckram Oak Farm	1:45.80
1980	Harvest Hero	Jean Cruguet	Guy J. Lyon	Universal Thoroughbred	1:46.20
1979	Quiet Crossing	Don MacBeth	Doug Peterson	Tay Hill Stable	1:47.00
1978	North Course	Don MacBeth	Charles Sanborn	Helmore Farm (Edgar Lucas)	1:43.40
1978	Prince Misko	Mike Miceli	Anthony Arcodia	Miami Lakes Ranch	1:43.20
1977	Qui Native	Don MacBeth	Charles Sanborn	S. Beller	1:41.40
1976	Modred	Craig Perret	Willard C. Freeman	Mrs. Paul L. Hexter	1:42.00
1976	Chati	Don Brumfield	James W. Murphy	Hickory Tree Stable	1:43.60
1975	Embassy Row	Craig Perret	Lawrence W. Jennings	Dan Williams	1:47.20
1974	Key to the Gun	Don MacBeth	J. Bowes Bond	Nydrie Stable (Daniel G. Van Clief)	1:43.80
1974	Don't Be Late Jim	Joe Imparato	Dewey Smith	Audley Farm Stable	1:44.60
1973	Bold Nix	Carlos Barrera	Frank J. McManus	Raymond M. Curtis	1:44.60
1972	Floor Show	Michael Hole	Ira Hanford	Mill River Stable	1:44.20
1971	Gleaming	Eddie Maple	Reggie Cornell	Calumet Farm	1:49.20
1970	Well Mannered	Frank Verardi	Anthony L. Basile	Bwamazon Farm	1:44.40
1970	Jaradara	Eddie Maple	Lawrence W. Jennings	A-Dee Farm	1:44.00
1969	Al Hattab	Ray Broussard	Warren A. Croll Jr.	Pelican Stable (Rachel Carpenter)	1:42.00
1968	Jig Time	Jesse Davidson	MacKenzie Miller	Cragwood Stables	1:45.80
1967	Air Rights	Eddie Belmonte	Pancho Martin	Sigmund Sommer	1:45.20
1966	Jolly Jet	Nick Shuk	Frank Y. Whiteley Jr.	Powhatan Stable	1:44.00
1965	Eurasian	Johnny Sellers	Bert Mulholland	George D. Widener Jr.	1:43.20
1964	Knightly Manner	Howard Grant	James W. Maloney	William Haggin Perry	1:42.40
1963	Raritan Valley	Paul Kallai	Joe Kulina	Glenelg Stable (Anderson Fowler)	1:43.60
1962	Green Ticket	Eric Guerin	William W. Stephens	Adele L. Rand	1:43.40
1961	Beau Prince	Steve Brooks	Horace A. Jones	Calumet Farm	1:43.40
1960	Irish Lancer	Chris Rogers	Norman McLeod	Pebblebrook Farm (C. Grief Raible)	1:44.60
1959	Atoll	Bill Hartack	Ray Metcalf	Elkcam Stable (Frank & Elliott Mackle)	1:45.00
1958	Plion	Bill Hartack	Tom Jolley	Edward Potter Jr.	1:44.80
1957	Pro-Brandy	Howard Grant	Deverne Emery	Carolyn K. Stable (Irving Kirschbaum)	1:44.20
1957	Stratmat	Richard Lawless	L. Harry Silver	Modan Stable (Moe Fiengold)	1:43.20
1956	Greek Spy	Eric Guerin	Sherrill W. Ward	C. Ulrick Bay	1:41.20
1955	Star Rover	Walter Blum	Edward Anspach	Mrs. Irving Gushen	1:43.80
1954	Artismo	Dave Gorman	Robert L. Dotter	James Cox Brady Jr.	1:43.80
1953	Landlocked	James Stout	Robert L. Dotter	James Cox Brady Jr.	1:45.80
1952	Flaunt	Keith Stuart	H. W. Williams	Arnold Skjeveland	1:46.60
1951	Uncle Miltie	Dave Gorman	Andrew C. Colando	Joseph J. Colando	1:46.00
1950	Lights Up	George Hettinger	Jack Creevy	George D. Widener Jr.	1:45.20
1949	Colonel Mike	Basil James	Eugene Jacobs	Eugene Jacobs	1:47.20
1948	First Nighter	Dave Gorman	William J. Hirsch	S. A. Mason II	1:44.80
1947	Lighthouse	Tommy Malley	Edward L. Feakes Sr.	Woodland Farm	1:44.20
1946	Lookout Dice	Nick Jemas	G. Lewis	Lookout Stock Farm Stable (Jimmy Brink)	1:45.20
