= Lawrence W. Jennings =

Personal information
- Born: October 4, 1917 Baltimore, Maryland
- Died: July 6, 1992 (aged 74) New Hyde Park, New York
- Occupation: Trainer

Horse racing career
- Sport: Horse racing
- Career wins: 1,100+

Major racing wins
- Orange Bowl Handicap (1970); Lamplighter Stakes (1970, 1975); Christmas Day Handicap (1972, 1990); Miami Beach Handicap (1972); Salvator Mile Handicap (1973); Woodlawn Stakes (1974); Oceanport Stakes (1976, 1984); Monmouth Invitational Handicap (1978); Native Street Handicap (1979); Vagrancy Handicap (1979); Boiling Springs Stakes (1981); Seminole Handicap (1987); Widener Handicap (1987); Yaddo Handicap (1989); McKnight Handicap (1991); Aqueduct Handicap (1991)

Significant horses
- Launch a Pegasus, Neapolitan Way, Paris Opera, World Appeal

Lawrence W. Jennings (October 4, 1917 – July 6, 1992) was an American Thoroughbred racehorse trainer whom the January 5, 1972 edition of The Miami News called "one of the most consistently successful horse trainers in the country."

Before becoming a racehorse trainer, Jennings graduated from Mount Saint Joseph High School in Baltimore and then went on to earn degrees from the University of Maryland, Baltimore County and Frostburg State University. Among his top-graded wins in Thoroughbred racing was a victory in the Monmouth Invitational Handicap with Delta Flag and the Widener Handicap with Launch a Pegasus. His best result in the U.S. Triple Crown series was a second in the 1974 Preakness Stakes with Neapolitan Way.

Due to declining health, Lawrence Jennings retired in early 1992 having won more than 1,100 races during his 38 years as a trainer. He died of cancer on July 6 of that year. His son, Lawrence Jennings Jr., followed in his father's footsteps and trained thoroughbreds for 23 years. Lawrence W. Jennings Jr. died in Florida on November 6, 2011.
