= Arthur B. Hancock III =

American racehorse owner (1943–2026)

- Born: February 22, 1943; Nashville, Tennessee, U.S.
- Died: September 18, 2026 (aged 83); Paris, Kentucky, U.S.
- Education: Vanderbilt University
- Occupation: Thoroughbred racehorse owner/breeder
- Spouse: Staci
- Children: Son: Arthur IV; Daughters: Alex, Hutchi, Kate, Lynn, Walker
- Parent(s): Arthur B. Hancock, Jr. Waddell Walker

Arthur Boyd Hancock III (February 22, 1943 – September 18, 2026) was an American owner of Thoroughbred racehorses, the owner of Stone Farm, a 2,000-acre (8 km^{2}) horse breeding operation in Paris, Kentucky, and a composer of Bluegrass music.

Hancock was a member of one of the pre-eminent American horse racing families. His grandfather, Arthur B. Hancock (1875–1957), founded Claiborne Farm, his father, Arthur B. "Bull" Hancock, Jr. (1910–1972), expanded the business to where it is considered the most important breeding farm in the U.S. during the 20th century and whose sales and influence also impacted European racing.

After graduating from Vanderbilt University, Hancock moved to the New York City area where he worked as an apprentice under future Hall of Fame trainer Edward A. Neloy. While Hancock's younger brother Seth would eventually take over the running of Claiborne Farm, Hancock built Stone Farm into a respected and successful breeding and racing operation which earned the family its first ever win in the Kentucky Derby. In partnership with one of his longtime clients, Manhattan real estate broker Leone J. Peters, he bred and raced Gato Del Sol who won the 1982 Derby. He and Peters also teamed up to breed Risen Star, winner of the 1988 Preakness and Belmont Stakes.

Through H-G-W Partners, Hancock owned and raced 1989 U.S. Horse of the Year Sunday Silence whose wins included the Kentucky Derby, Preakness Stakes, and Breeders' Cup Classic. Hancock also co-bred the 2000 Kentucky Derby winner Fusaichi Pegasus. He has also raced in partnership Kentucky Oaks winner Goodbye Halo and Blue Grass Stakes / Haskell Invitational Handicap winner Menifee.

A member of The Jockey Club, in September 1996, Hancock was elected to the board of directors of Fasig-Tipton Co.

== Music ==
Hancock was a devotee of Bluegrass music and wrote songs which have been recorded by artists such as Grandpa Jones, Willie Nelson and Ray Price.

He recorded for the Monument and Super Productions record labels.

== Personal life and death ==
Hancock lived at Stone Farm in Paris, Kentucky with his wife Staci and their six children. He died from pancreatic cancer on September 18, 2026, at the age of 83.

== Sources ==
- Arthur Hancock III at the NTRA
