= Cannonade =

American-bred Thoroughbred racehorse

- Sire: Bold Bidder
- Grandsire: Bold Ruler
- Dam: Queen Sucree
- Damsire: Ribot
- Sex: Stallion
- Foaled: 12 May 1971
- Died: August 3, 1993 (aged 22)
- Country: United States
- Colour: Bay
- Breeder: John M. Olin
- Owner: John M. Olin
- Trainer: Woody Stephens
- Record: 25: 7-3-6
- Earnings: $501,164

Major wins
- Great American Stakes (1973); Kentucky Jockey Club Stakes (1973); Aqueduct Handicap (1973); Stepping Stone Purse (1974) American Classic Race wins: Kentucky Derby (1974)
- Last updated on June 7, 2007

Cannonade (May 12, 1971 – August 3, 1993) was an American Thoroughbred racehorse best known as the winner of the 1974 Kentucky Derby.

== Background ==
Owned and bred by prominent businessman John M. Olin, Cannonade was foaled at Gainesway Farm in Lexington, Kentucky. Cannonade was sired by Bold Bidder, whose other progeny included Spectacular Bid. His dam Queen Sucree was a descendant of the broodmare Almahmoud, making her a member of the same branch of Thoroughbred Family 2-d which produced Northern Dancer, Halo and Danehill.

== Racing career ==
Racing at age two on the New York State circuit, Cannonade was trained by future Hall of Fame inductee Woody Stephens. He was beaten twice before earning his first win, then in June captured the now-defunct 5½ furlong Great American Stakes at Belmont Park. Cannonade's next significant win came on December 29 Aqueduct Handicap at Aqueduct Racetrack, followed by a third-place finish in the important Champagne Stakes. His also won at Churchill Downs in Louisville, Kentucky, where he won the Kentucky Jockey Club Stakes.

Cannonade had a racemate named Judger who was owned by Seth Hancock's Cherry Valley Farm. In the spring of 1974, the two 3-year-old colts competed on the Florida racing circuit in the lead-up to the Kentucky Derby. In the Fountain of Youth Stakes, Judger finished second ahead of Cannonade, who was unplaced. In the Flamingo Stakes, Judger finished third, again ahead of an unplaced Cannonade. Judger then won the important Grade I Florida Derby, with an improving Cannonade taking second.

=== 1974 Kentucky Derby ===
In front of a record Churchill Downs crowd of 163,628, Cannonade went to the post along with twenty-two other horses in the largest Derby field ever. Because they shared a trainer, Cannonade was coupled with Judger for the parimutuel wagering, and the duo went off as the betting favorite. Ridden by Ángel Cordero Jr., Cannonade worked his way through the unwieldy field and was in front by mile pole. He never relinquished the lead, winning by 2¼ lengths in a time of 2:04 on a track rated as fast. The win was the first in the Derby for both Cordero and Stephens. Stablemate Judger finished a disappointing eighth.

In the remaining two legs of the American Triple Crown series, Cannonade finished third in both the Preakness Stakes at Pimlico Race Course and in the Belmont Stakes at Belmont Park to Darby Dan Farm's Little Current.

== Stud record ==
Cannonade retired after his 1974 racing season to stand at stud at Gainesway Farm. The major winners he produced are:

c = colt, f = filly

Foaled	Name	Sex	Major Wins
1975	Heavenly Ade	c	Delaware Handicap
1980	Caveat	c	Belmont Stakes
1980	Load the Cannons	c	San Juan Capistrano Invitational Handicap

== Death ==
Cannonade lived until the age of twenty-two, when he was euthanized on August 3, 1993, reportedly due to infirmities of natural causes. He is buried in the Gainesway equine cemetery.

== Pedigree ==
Pedigree of Cannonade (USA), bay stallion, 1971
Sire Bold Bidder (USA) 1962	Bold Ruler (USA); 1954	Nasrullah	Nearco
Sire Bold Bidder (USA) 1962	Bold Ruler (USA); 1954	Nasrullah	Mumtaz Begum
Sire Bold Bidder (USA) 1962	Bold Ruler (USA); 1954	Miss Disco	Discovery
Sire Bold Bidder (USA) 1962	Bold Ruler (USA); 1954	Miss Disco	Outdone
Sire Bold Bidder (USA) 1962	High Bid (USA); 1956	To Market	Market Wise
Sire Bold Bidder (USA) 1962	High Bid (USA); 1956	To Market	Pretty Does
Sire Bold Bidder (USA) 1962	High Bid (USA); 1956	Stepping Stone	Princequillo
Sire Bold Bidder (USA) 1962	High Bid (USA); 1956	Stepping Stone	Step Across
Dam Queen Sucree (USA) 1966	Ribot (GB); 1952	Tenerani	Bellini
Dam Queen Sucree (USA) 1966	Ribot (GB); 1952	Tenerani	Tofanella
Dam Queen Sucree (USA) 1966	Ribot (GB); 1952	Romanella	El Greco
Dam Queen Sucree (USA) 1966	Ribot (GB); 1952	Romanella	Barbara Burrini
Dam Queen Sucree (USA) 1966	Cosmah (USA); 1953	Cosmic Bomb	Pharamond
Dam Queen Sucree (USA) 1966	Cosmah (USA); 1953	Cosmic Bomb	Banish Fear
Dam Queen Sucree (USA) 1966	Cosmah (USA); 1953	Almahmoud	Mahmoud
Dam Queen Sucree (USA) 1966	Cosmah (USA); 1953	Almahmoud	Arbitrator (Family 2-d)
