= Seth W. Hancock =

American racehorse breeder

- Born: September 19, 1949 (age 77); Kentucky, USA
- Citizenship: United States
- Education: South College; University of Kentucky
- Occupation: Horse Breeder
- Organization: Claiborne Farm
- Parents: Arthur B. Hancock Jr. (father); Waddell W. Hancock (mother)
- Relatives: Arthur B. Hancock III (older brother)
- Website: Official website

Seth W. Hancock (born September 19, 1949) is an American breeder of thoroughbred racehorses. He was the owner of Claiborne Farm.

== Overview ==
Seth Hancock was born in 1949 as the second-born son to Arthur B. "Bull" Hancock Jr. and Waddell Hancock (née Walker). His older brother named Arthur III, as well as an older sister named Clay, and a younger sister named Dell.

After attending South College and the University of Kentucky, where he majored in Agricultural science, he graduated in 1971. The following year, Seth returned to Claiborne Farm where initially he was supposed to manage the farm together with his older brother Arthur.

However, on September of that year, "Bull" Hancock died of cancer. Later on, Arthur III disputed with Ogden Phipps, Charles Kenney, and William Haggin Perry, who made up an advisory committee created by "Bull" Hancock to choose his successor. Subsequently, Arthur III moved on to Stone Farm, forcing Seth to manage Claiborne all by himself. Seth's first big task after that was to set up Secretariat's breeding syndicate.

By this point in time, Secretariat won numerous races as a 2-year-old, and was already named the American Horse of the Year. However, in early 1973, Secretariat's owner/breeder of record Christopher Chenery had suddenly died. His successor, Penny Chenery, was forced to sell the horse by way of a breeding syndicate in order to pay off her father's inheritance tax. The Cheneries had known the Hancocks since their grandfather's generation, and this led to Penny asking Seth to set up the horse's breeding syndicate. After discussions between the two, it was decided that the horse would be syndicated for 32 shares worth $190,000 each for a total of $6.08 million; this was the most expensive syndicate at the time, surpassing even that of Nijinsky which "Bull" Hancock syndicated for $5.44 million. Seth was successful in this endeavor, and the shares sold out.

Following the success of Secretariat's syndicate, Seth went on to syndicate many other stallions, such as Mr. Prospector, Danzig, and Unbridled.

When "Bull" died, he willed his successor to "not own a racehorse of his own". Initially, Seth honored his wish, and sold off the horses he owned, most notably Sham, who was Secretariat's rival. Later on, however, Seth reneged on that will and once again started to own his own horses.

One of the horses Seth has owned since was Swale, who won the 1984 Kentucky Derby. This was the first time a horse bred and owned by the Claiborne Farm became a Derby winner, as all previous winners bred at the farm were foaled by broodmares from other farms. Swale later won the Belmont Stakes as well, but eventually died for unknown reasons.

Other horses Seth owned (including those jointly owned with others) includes BC Mile winner Lure, Blame, who won against Zenyatta, and Forty Niner, who was a successful stallion in Japan.

Other horses the Claiborne Farm bred but did not own include Nureyev and Caerleon.

Seth retired in 2015, and passed on the farm to his son, Seth Hancock Jr.
