= Risen Star =

American-bred Thoroughbred racehorse

- Sire: Secretariat
- Grandsire: Bold Ruler
- Dam: Ribbon
- Damsire: His Majesty
- Sex: Stallion
- Foaled: 1985
- Country: United States
- Color: Dark Bay
- Breeder: Arthur B. Hancock III & Leone J. Peters
- Owner: Ronnie Lamarque & Louie Roussel III
- Trainer: Louie Roussel III
- Record: 11: 8-2-1
- Earnings: $2,029,845

Major wins
- Minstrel Stakes (1987); Louisiana Derby (1988) U.S. Triple Crown series: Preakness Stakes (1988); Belmont Stakes (1988)

Awards
- U.S. Champion 3-Yr-Old Colt (1988)

Honors
- Risen Star Stakes at Fair Grounds; Fair Grounds Racing Hall of Fame (1991)

Risen Star (March 25, 1985 – March 13, 1998) was an American Thoroughbred racehorse who won the Preakness Stakes and Belmont Stakes in 1988.

== Background ==
The dark bay colt was the son of the great Triple Crown winner Secretariat and out of the mare Ribbon. Bred by Arthur B. Hancock III and Leone J. Peters, Risen Star was bought by Louisianans Ronnie Lamarque and Louie Roussel III at the 1987 Calder Two-Year-Olds In Training sale. He was trained by Roussel, a devout Roman Catholic who was stricken by throat cancer but recovered. Ten percent of Risen Star's winnings were donated to the Little Sisters of the Poor, a Roman Catholic order of nuns.

== Racing career ==
As a two-year-old, Risen Star was lightly raced, winning the Minstrel Stakes at Louisiana Downs.

He started his sophomore season by winning the Grade 2 Louisiana Derby under jockey Shane Romero. Then, two weeks prior to the Kentucky Derby, he had another Grade 2 victory in the Lexington Stakes, in which he was ridden by Jacinto Vasquez.

He went into the Kentucky Derby as the morning-line third choice. The colts laid off the pace, their jockeys believing that the front-running grey filly Winning Colors would tire at the end of the race, but she didn't tire and won by a neck going wire to wire. Under jockey Eddie Delahoussaye, Risen Star was forced to the outside on the backstretch, where he stayed until making a charge at the head of the stretch. He couldn't make up all of the lost ground and finished third.

Two weeks later in the Preakness Stakes, Risen Star and Delahoussaye won the second leg of the Triple Crown, turning the tables on his filly rival Winning Colors to win by 1 1/2 lengths over Brian's Time, Winning Colors, and local favorite Private Terms. Since Risen Star's sire was (Secretariat) and his grandsire was (Bold Ruler), this victory meant that three successive generations won the Preakness Stakes, a feat accomplished only one other time.

In the Belmont Stakes, the third leg of the Triple Crown, Risen Star and Delahoussaye pulled away from the field to win by 14 3/4 lengths with a final time of 2:26 2/5. It is the fourth-fastest Belmont Stakes behind Hall of Famers A.P. Indy, Easy Goer, and Secretariat. Because of his two Classic victories, Risen Star won the second $1,000,000 Chrysler Triple Crown Bonus that was awarded to the three-year-old with the best finishes in the three races.

== Retirement ==
An injury that occurred in the Belmont forced Risen Star into early retirement. He won the Eclipse Award as 1988's top three-year-old. By winning the Eclipse, he became the first third-generation Eclipse Award winner in the same category (his sire Secretariat won in 1973 and his grandsire Bold Ruler won in 1957). Risen Star was retired to stud and went on to sire the millionaire Grade One winner Star Standard, as well as German runner Risen Raven.

Risen Star died on March 13, 1998, at Walmac International, where he is buried. A top Kentucky Derby prep race, the Risen Star Stakes, is named in his honor. It is held annually at Fair Grounds Race Course in New Orleans, Louisiana.

== Breeding ==
Pedigree of Risen Star
Sire Secretariat ch. 1970	Bold Ruler brown 1954	Nasrullah	Nearco
Sire Secretariat ch. 1970	Bold Ruler brown 1954	Nasrullah	Mumtaz Begum
Sire Secretariat ch. 1970	Bold Ruler brown 1954	Miss Disco	Discovery
Sire Secretariat ch. 1970	Bold Ruler brown 1954	Miss Disco	Outdone
Sire Secretariat ch. 1970	Somethingroyal bay 1952	Princequillo	Prince Rose
Sire Secretariat ch. 1970	Somethingroyal bay 1952	Princequillo	Cosquilla
Sire Secretariat ch. 1970	Somethingroyal bay 1952	Imperatrice	Caruso
Sire Secretariat ch. 1970	Somethingroyal bay 1952	Imperatrice	Cinquepace
Dam Ribbon bay 1977	His Majesty bay 1968	Ribot	Tenerani
Dam Ribbon bay 1977	His Majesty bay 1968	Ribot	Romanella
Dam Ribbon bay 1977	His Majesty bay 1968	Flower Bowl	Alibhai
Dam Ribbon bay 1977	His Majesty bay 1968	Flower Bowl	Flower Bed
Dam Ribbon bay 1977	Break Through bay 1970	Hail To Reason	Turn-To
Dam Ribbon bay 1977	Break Through bay 1970	Hail To Reason	Nothirdchance
Dam Ribbon bay 1977	Break Through bay 1970	Quaheri	Olympia
Dam Ribbon bay 1977	Break Through bay 1970	Quaheri	Bibibeg
