= Rick Wilson (jockey) =

American jockey

Personal information
- Born: August 12, 1953 (age 73) McAlester, Oklahoma
- Occupation: Jockey

Horse racing career
- Sport: Horse racing
- Career wins: 4,939

Major racing wins
- Graded Stakes wins Minuteman Handicap (1978); Long Branch Stakes (1979); Delaware Oaks (1982); Anne Arundel Handicap (1986); Vineland Handicap (1988); Boiling Springs Handicap (1988); Betsy Ross Handicap (1988, 1989); Sorority Stakes (1988); Cherry Hill Mile Stakes (1989); Molly Pitcher Handicap (1989); Polynesian Handicap (1990, 1991); Lamplighter Handicap (1991); Delaware Handicap (1991); Baltimore Budweiser Breeders' Cup Handicap (1991); Garden State Stakes (1991); Wood Memorial Stakes (1993); Fountain of Youth Stakes (1993); Ben Ali Stakes (1993); Carousel Stakes (1993); Federico Tesio Stakes (1993); John B. Campbell Handicap (1993); Laurel Futurity (1993); Black-Eyed Susan Stakes (1994); Reeve Schley, Jr. Stakes (1994); True North Handicap (1994); Finger Lakes Budweiser Breeders' Cup Handicap (1994); Martha Washington Stakes (1994, 1998); Salvator Mile Handicap (1994); Boojum Handicap (1995); Boiling Springs Handicap (1995); Laurel Futurity (1995); Philadelphia Park Budweiser Breeders' Cup Handicap (1995); General George Handicap (1996); Hutcheson Stakes (1996); Withers Stakes (1996, 2001); Canadian Turf Handicap (1997); Red Bank Handicap (1997); Violet Handicap (1997); Hollywood Turf Express Handicap (1998); John B. Campbell Handicap (1998, 1999); Lamplighter Handicap (1998); Belmont Futurity Stakes (2000); Cliff Hanger Handicap (2001); Eatontown Handicap (2001); Endine Stakes (2001); Gotham Stakes (2001); Beaumont Stakes (2001); Cicada Stakes (2001); Prioress Stakes (2001); Barbara Fritchie Handicap (2003)

Racing awards
- Philadelphia Park Champion jockey (9 times); Garden State Park Champion jockey (4 times); Monmouth Park Champion jockey (1990)

Honors
- Parx Racing Hall of Fame (2011)

Significant horses
- Appealing Skier, Xtra Heat, Storm Tower, Basqueian, Richly Blended

Rick Wilson (born August 12, 1953, in McAlester, Oklahoma) is a retired American jockey and a member of the inaugural class of inductees into the Parx Racing Hall of Fame. During his riding career, Wilson had 4,939 wins from 24,681 starts and total earnings of $77,303,270.

== Racing ==
Wilson was able to achieve success from an early age, starting his thirty-five-year career in 1972 when he achieved his first win as a teenager racing quarter horses in his native Oklahoma. Wilson had a 4,939-win career, which ranked him at the time, twentieth all-time amongst jockeys. He also earned 4,250 seconds and 3,461 thirds. His top winning mount was the filly Xtra Heat, the 2001 American Champion Three-Year-Old Filly with which he had thirteen wins and two second-place finishes. Wilson fondly refers to her as “all heart, one in a million.” Wilson has seven Triple Crown mounts during his career, with five in the Preakness Stakes at Pimlico Race Course and two in the Kentucky Derby. The best day of his career was a six-win day at Philadelphia Park. In 2005 he was nominated for the George Woolf Memorial Jockey Award for high standards of professional conduct in racing and life. Wilson is quoted in The Baltimore Sun “’It's a rush being a rider,’ he said. ‘If you ride enough, you know you're going to get hurt. But you can get killed crossing a road, too.’”

== Accidents ==
Wilson's luck began to turn on him late in his career with his first injury occurring in October 2001, the twenty-eighth year of his career. He was thrown from his horse, Home Verse, at Pimlico Race Course when the horse broke a leg in the race's final turn. Wilson was thrown into the horse behind him causing him to suffer a broken femur in his right leg and three broken ribs. However, Wilson never once considered retiring in the 54 weeks he spent recovering. Just a few years later on May 8, 2004, at fifty years old, Wilson suffered a career-ending injury after being thrown from his horse for a second time. During the second race his mount, Advance to Go, stumbled out of the starting gate. While his horse was stumbling Wilson was tossed from the saddle, whereupon his mount proceeded to inadvertently step on the jockey's head as he lay prone on the racetrack. He was flown from the Pimlico Race Course via a State Police MedEvac (medical evacuation) helicopter to the Maryland Shock Trauma Center. He spent the next week at the facility diagnosed to be in critical condition. He was discharged from the trauma center on May 25, 2004. He was then moved to Kernan Hospital for physical rehabilitation, where he remained for some time until being released on June 20, 2004. Although he was required to undergo several surgeries his vision was distorted in his right eye due to severe cornea damage. He suffered a tremendous amount of additional nerve damage to the right side of his face. These sustained injuries combined left him unable to continue racing. During this time Wilson visited a psychiatrist to help overcome the emotional and mental trauma the event had caused him. Shortly after his bad incident, Wilson's compassion for racehorses compelled him to become a steward.

== Family ==
Rick Wilson married nurse Jean Wilson and together they have four children. He and his family live in Sykesville, Maryland.
