= Little Current =

American-bred Thoroughbred racehorse

- Sire: Sea-Bird
- Grandsire: Dan Cupid
- Dam: Luiana
- Damsire: My Babu
- Sex: Stallion
- Foaled: 1971
- Country: United States
- Colour: Chestnut
- Breeder: Darby Dan Farm
- Owner: Darby Dan Farm
- Trainer: Lou Rondinello
- Record: 16: 4-3-1
- Earnings: $354,704

Major wins
- Everglades Stakes (1974); Triple Crown race wins: Preakness Stakes (1974); Belmont Stakes (1974)

Awards
- United States Champion 3-Yr-Old Colt (1974)
- Last updated on April 24, 2007

Little Current (April 5, 1971 – January 19, 2003) was an American Thoroughbred racehorse who won the final two legs of the 1974 U.S. Triple Crown both the Preakness Stakes and the Belmont Stakes.

== Background ==
Owned and bred by John W. Galbreath's Darby Dan Farm in Lexington, Kentucky, he was out of the mare Luiana and sired by the great European champion Sea-Bird, whose Timeform rating at 145 is the second highest in racing history, surpassed only by Frankel's 147.

John Galbreath and his wife owned a summer retreat at Manitoulin Island on the north shore of Lake Huron in Ontario, Canada. In 1969, they named one of their new foals Manitoulin. Sired by U.S. Racing Hall of Fame inductee Tom Rolfe, the colt raced for the Galbreaths in Ireland, where at the famous Curragh Racecourse he won the 1972 Royal Whip Stakes and Blandford Stakes. In 1971, the Galbreaths named another new foal for their summer home, this time for the island's town of Little Current.

== 1973: Two-Year-Old Season ==
Trained by Lou Rondinello and ridden by Ángel Cordero Jr., Little Current made four starts at age two but despite his breeding, showed little promise. Wintered in Florida, at age three Little Current prepared for the 1974 Kentucky Derby. He won two of his first five races that spring, including the 1 1/8 miles (1.8 km) Everglades Stakes at Hialeah Park. Entered in the Blue Grass Stakes, under new rider Miguel Rivera he finished fourth to Claiborne Farm's Judger. Trained by Woody Stephens, Judger went to the gate in the Kentucky Derby as the betting favorite.

== 1974 U.S. Triple Crown Series ==
=== Kentucky Derby ===
One year earlier, Thoroughbred racing had witnessed Secretariat captivate much of the American public with his record-breaking performances en route to becoming the first Triple Crown winner in twenty-five years. One of the spillovers from Secretariat's enormous popularity was the record crowd of 163,628 who showed up at Churchill Downs on May 4, 1974, for the 100th running of the Kentucky Derby. Among those in attendance were Her Royal Highness Princess Margaret and her husband, Lord Snowden.

In light of Little Current's performances leading up to the 1 1/4 mi (2.0 km) Derby, he was given little consideration by the betting public and was sent off at more than 22:1 odds. Because jockey Miguel Rivera had earlier committed to ride Rube The Great in the Derby, Bobby Ussery was aboard Little Current in the twenty-three-horse field, the largest in the race's history. Complicating matters for Little Current was that trainer Lou Rondinello was in hospital recovering from surgery.

Leaving from post position 10, Little Current was last at the quarter pole and at the mile mark was still trapped behind the large field in seventeenth place. Despite a strong drive after the mile pole, he finished fifth, more than six lengths back of winner Cannonade, who was ridden by Ángel Cordero Jr. Little Current in the homestretch had run down the middle of the track and passed numerous horses to finish fifth. As a result of the difficulties experienced by many entrants due to the large field, Churchill Downs officials, including Chairman of the Board and owner of Little Current John W. Galbreath, adopted a new rule limiting the field to twenty horses beginning in 1975.

=== Preakness Stakes ===
Notwithstanding Little Current's off-the-board showings in the Blue Grass Stakes and the Derby, his handlers believed the colt was in part a victim of circumstances and a much better racehorse than his record showed. As such, he was entered in the Preakness Stakes, the second leg of the Triple Crown.

Ridden by Miguel Rivera, Little Current was again given little chance by bettors and was sent off at 13-1 odds. Near the back of the pack for much of the 1 3/16 miles (1.9 km) race, he raced close to the inner rail until a hole opened between horses. Launching an explosive drive, the colt drove through the narrow opening, quickly caught the leaders, then stormed past them to win by seven lengths over Neapolitan Way and Derby winner Cannonade. Little Current's winning margin was the largest in twenty-three years.

=== Belmont Stakes ===
The third and final leg of the American Classic Races is the 1 1/2 mi (2.4 km)-long Belmont Stakes. Over the years, many great horses have won the Derby and Preakness only to fall short in the longer race. However, Little Current's sire, Sea Bird, had established himself as one of Europe's greatest runners with dominating victories at 1 1/2 mi (2.4 km) in the 1965 Epsom Derby and the Prix de l'Arc de Triomphe.

In a nine-horse field, Little Current sat nine lengths back in eighth place while Kentucky Derby winner Cannonade and Jolly Johu dueled for the lead. Making the turn for home, again Little Current came storming through to run away from the pack and score another seven-length win.

After capturing the Belmont, Little Current only raced three times. He did not start again until August's Monmouth Invitational Handicap where, after being nearly 20 lengths behind the leader, he put on another explosive drive to finish second by a nose to Holding Pattern. These two horses then met in the Travers Stakes with the same result.

John Galbreath, Little Current's owner, had also raced successfully in Europe. In 1972, his colt Roberto won England's most prestigious race, The Derby. He wanted to win France's most important race, the Prix de l'Arc de Triomphe, and because of Little Current's easy victory at 1 1/2 mi (2.4 km) in the Belmont Stakes, Galbreath believed the horse had a chance in the Arc. In order to first see how the colt could handle the grass surface he would run on in France, Galbreath entered him in the Lawrence Realization Stakes on Belmont Park's turf course. However, Little Current chipped a bone in his right front ankle and was retired from racing. Despite his shortened racing season, he was voted the 1974 Eclipse Award for Outstanding 3-Year-Old Male Horse.

== Stud career ==
With owner John W. Galbreath maintaining a 25% interest, Little Current was syndicated for $4 million. He stood at stud for the first time in 1975 at his owner's Darby Dan Farm in Lexington, Kentucky. He was eventually sent to stand at Buck Pond Farm in nearby Versailles, whose owners, Doug and Karen Arnold, acquired an interest in him. He was later sent for stud duty at Good Guys Farm in Folsom, Louisiana then in 1995 was purchased by equine veterinarian Dr. Ann Hansen and her husband, Mark, who brought him to their farm near Monroe, Washington.

Little Current met with modest success as a stallion. He sired thirty-five stakes winners including 1983 Flamingo Stakes winner Current Hope, 1990 James F. Lyttle Memorial Handicap winner Little Raisin, as well as Curribot (Little Current—Ameribot, by Ribot), who won 22 stakes races and placed in 16 others with lifetime earnings of $491,527. In 1997 he was pensioned and lived at the Hansen's farm for another six years, the oldest living winner of a Triple Crown race. At age thirty-two, Little Current had to be euthanized as a result of an intestinal tumor. His remains were sent to Buck Pond Farm for burial in their equine cemetery.

== Pedigree ==
Pedigree of Little Current
Sire Sea Bird	Dan Cupid	Native Dancer	Polynesian
Sire Sea Bird	Dan Cupid	Native Dancer	Geisha
Sire Sea Bird	Dan Cupid	Vixenette	Sickle
Sire Sea Bird	Dan Cupid	Vixenette	Lady Reynard
Sire Sea Bird	Sicalade	Sicambre	Prince Bio
Sire Sea Bird	Sicalade	Sicambre	Sif
Sire Sea Bird	Sicalade	Mamelade	Maurepas
Sire Sea Bird	Sicalade	Mamelade	Couleur
Dam Luiana	My Babu	Djebel	Tourbillon
Dam Luiana	My Babu	Djebel	Loika
Dam Luiana	My Babu	Perfume	Badruddin
Dam Luiana	My Babu	Perfume	Lavendula
Dam Luiana	Banquet Bell	Polynesian	Unbreakable
Dam Luiana	Banquet Bell	Polynesian	Black Polly
Dam Luiana	Banquet Bell	Dinner Horn	Pot Au Feu
Dam Luiana	Banquet Bell	Dinner Horn	Tophorn
