= Darby Dan Farm =

Thoroughbred breeding farm

Coordinates: 39°55′22″N 83°13′01″W

Darby House

Darby Dan Farm is a produce, livestock, and thoroughbred horse breeding and training farm founded in 1935 near the Darby Creek in Galloway, Ohio by businessman John W. Galbreath. Named for the creek and for Galbreath's son, Daniel M. Galbreath (1928–1995), it was expanded from an original 85-acre (340,000 m^{2}) farm into a 4,000 acre (16 km^{2}) estate. Established in 1954 on the original area, Darby House today serves as a banquet and retreat facility. Still in the hands of the Galbreath family, it has 250 acres (1 km^{2}) of woodlands, a 110-acre (0.4 km^{2}) animal preserve, and approximately 3000 acres (12 km^{2}) used for the commercial growing of food crops. The horse farm has 750 acres (3 km^{2}) of blue grass pasture and many barns and breeding facilities. Also, 39 houses were built on the property.

== Kentucky farm ==
Standing at stud at Darby Dan Farm in Ohio was Idle Hour Stock Farm's 1932 Kentucky Derby winner Burgoo King. When Idle Hour owner Edward R. Bradley died in 1946, his Lexington, Kentucky property was sold then sub-divided into smaller farms. The 650-acre (2.6 km^{2}) core property on the north side of Old Frankfort Pike was purchased by Edward S. Moore who owned it for only a short time before selling it to the Galbreath family in 1949 who renamed it Darby Dan Farm. Colonel Bradley's stud Black Toney is buried there, marked by a bronze statue.

Under John W. Galbreath and his wife Dorothy, Darby Dan Farm made important stallion acquisitions beginning in 1957 when he paid Rex Ellsworth $1 million for a half-interest in his 1956 Horse of the Year, Swaps, then later acquired the remaining half for another $1 million. In 1961, Galbreath imported the undefeated Ribot from Europe and in 1965 brought French Hall of Fame horse Sea-Bird to stand at stud for five years at Darby Dan Farm under a $1.5 million lease. That same year, Galbreath was part of a syndicate that acquired Sword Dancer for stud duty at Darby Dan Farm.

The operation eventually produced several champions, including:

- Chateaugay - 1963 Kentucky Derby winner
- Proud Clarion - 1967 Kentucky Derby winner
- Roberto - 1972 Epsom Derby winner
- Little Current - 1974 Preakness and Belmont Stakes winner
- Proud Truth - 1985 Breeders' Cup Classic winner
- Graustark - undefeated in seven straight races, he sustained a career-ending injury while in the lead in the 1966 Blue Grass Stakes.

Darby Dan Farm is one of just two horse breeding farms in the world to both breed and own the Derby winners on both sides of the Atlantic Ocean. In 1974, Galbreath won the Eclipse Award for Outstanding Breeder.

In 1977 the Keeneland Association honored Darby Dan Farm with its Keeneland Mark of Distinction for their contribution to Keeneland and the Thoroughbred industry.

Among the trainers who conditioned Darby Dan horses for racing were:

- Jack Long
- Rollie T. Shepp
- Matthew H. Jordan
- Loyd Gentry Jr.
- Jimmy Conway
- Lou Rondinello
- John Veitch

After John W. Galbreath's death in 1988, Darby Dan Farms continued under the ownership of his son Daniel and daughter Joan (Jody) Phillips. In 1992, grandson John Phillips acquired the Kentucky farm from family members. Among their successes has been Soaring Softly, winner of the 1999 Breeders' Cup Filly & Mare Turf and Memories of Silver for the Phillips Racing Partnership.

=== Current stallions ===
As of January 2024, the following stallions are listed on the Darby Dan Farm website as standing stud at their farm:

- Bee Jersey
- Copper Bullet
- Country House
- Dialed In
- Flameaway
- Higher Power
- Leofric
- Modernist
- Tale of Ekati
- Tale of Silence
- Tapiture
- Title Ready

== Bibliography ==
- Bowen, Edward L. Legacies of the Turf (2003) Eclipse Press ISBN 978-1-58150-102-5
- June 1, 1959 Sports Illustrated article titled The Man, The Horse And The Deal That Made History
