= Breeders' Cup Distaff top three finishers =

This is a listing of the horses that finished in either first, second, or third place and the number of starters in the Breeders' Cup Distaff, a Grade I race for fillies and mares, three years old and up. An annual race run on the dirt, it was the final race of the first-day (Friday) card of the Breeders' Cup World Thoroughbred Championships since 2008. In 2018, it was returned to the Saturday card.

The race, which has been run in every Breeders' Cup since the first event in 1984, was known as the Breeders' Cup Ladies Classic between 2008 and 2012.

Year	Winner	Second	Third	Starters	Ref
2026	Nitrogen	Fully Subscribed	Measure	7	
2025	Scylla	Nitrogen	Regaled	13	
2024	Thorpedo Anna	Raging Sea	Candied	7	
2023	Idiomatic	Randomized	Le Da Vida	11	
2022	Malathaat	Blue Stripe	Clairiere	8	
2021	Marche Lorraine (JPN)	Dunbar Road	Malathaat	11	
2020	Monomoy Girl	Valiance	Dunbar Road	10	
2019	Blue Prize (ARG)	Midnight Bisou	Serengeti Empress	11	
2018	Monomoy Girl	Wow Cat	Midnight Bisou	11	
2017	Forever Unbridled	Abel Tasman	Paradise Woods	8	
2016	Beholder	Songbird	Forever Unbridled	8	
2015	Stopchargingmaria	Stellar Wind	Curalina	14	
2014	Untapable	Don't Tell Sophia	Iotapa	11	
2013	Beholder	Close Hatches	Authenticity	6	
2012	Royal Delta	My Miss Aurelia	Include Me Out	8	
2011	Royal Delta	It's Tricky	Pachattack	9	
2010	Unrivaled Belle	Blind Luck	Havre de Grace	11	
2009	Life Is Sweet	Mushka	Music Note	8	
2008	Zenyatta	Cocoa Beach	Music Note	8	
2007	Ginger Punch	Hystericalady	Octave	12	
2006	Round Pond	Happy Ticket (Note: Asi Siempre finished second but was disqualified to fourth for interference)	Balletto	13	
2005	Pleasant Home	Society Selection	Ashado	13	
2004	Ashado	Storm Flag Flying	Stellar Jayne	11	
2003	Adoration	Elloluv	Got Koko	7	
2002	Azeri	Farda Amiga	Imperial Gesture	8	
2001	Unbridled Elaine	Spain	Two Item Limit	11	
2000	Spain	Surfside	Heritage of Gold	9	
1999	Beautiful Pleasure	Banshee Breeze	Heritage of Gold	8	
1998	Escena	Banshee Breeze	Keeper Hill	8	
1997	Ajina	Sharp Cat	Escena	8	
1996	Jewel Princess	Serena's Song	Different	6	
1995	Inside Information	Heavenly Prize	Lakeway	10	
1994	One Dreamer	Heavenly Prize	Miss Dominique	9	
1993	Hollywood Wildcat	Paseana	Re Toss	8	
1992	Paseana	Versailles Treaty	Magical Maiden	14	
1991	Dance Smartly	Versailles Treaty	Brought To Mind	13	
1990	Bayakoa	Colonial Waters	Valay Maid	7	
1989	Bayakoa	Gorgeous	Open Mind	10	
1988	Personal Ensign	Winning Colors	Goodbye Halo	9	
1987	Sacahuista	Clabber Girl	Oueee Bebe	6	
1986	Lady's Secret	Fran's Valentine	Outstandingly	8	
1985	Life's Magic	Lady's Secret	Dontstop Themusic	7	
1984	Princess Rooney	Life's Magic	Adored	7	
