= Shuvee Stakes =

- Class: Grade II
- Location: Saratoga Race Course; Saratoga Springs, New York, United States
- Inaugurated: 1976 (at Belmont Park as Shuvee Handicap)
- Race type: Thoroughbred – Flat racing
- Website: NYRA

Race information
- Distance: 1 1/8 miles (9 furlongs)
- Surface: Dirt
- Track: Left-handed
- Qualification: Four-years-old & older, fillies and mares
- Weight: 124 lbs with allowances
- Purse: US$200,000 (since 2021)

The Shuvee Stakes is a Grade II American Thoroughbred horse race for fillies and mares that are four years old or older over a distance of 1 1/8 miles on the dirt track scheduled annually in August at Saratoga Race Course in Saratoga Springs, New York. The event currently carries a purse of $200,000.

== History ==
The race was named after the great U.S. Racing Hall of Fame filly, Shuvee, winner of the 1969 Fillies Triple Crown.

The inaugural running of the event was on 16 May 1976 at Belmont Park as the Shuvee Handicap as a one-mile event. The winner Proud Delta made an immediate impact for the event as she continued her winning ways to be crowned US Champion Older Dirt Female Horse.

The following year the distance for the event was increased to 1 1/16 miles and for the third running in 1978 the event was classified as a Grade II.

The event was upgraded to Grade I in 1986, the year Lady's Secret won the event en route to a Breeders' Cup Distaff victory at Santa Anita Park and U.S. Horse of the Year honors.

In 1995 the distance for the event reverted to its original one mile.

In 1997 the event was downgraded to Grade II and in 2012 the event was not held. NYRA moved the event to Saratoga for 2013 as they expanded the number of racing dates at that track. The event was downgraded to Grade III for its first running at the new track and the event holds this classification to date. Also that year the distance was increased to a mile-and-an-eighth.

Other notable mares to have won this race are 1995 winner Inside Information who won the event as the Shug McGaughey trained entry with Regal Solution defeating the short favorite and 1994 winner Sky Beauty and US Champion Older Dirt Female Horse. Later that year Inside Information would win the Breeders' Cup Distaff and be crowned US Champion Older Dirt Female Horse. The 1997 winner Hidden Lake would also later that year be voted US Champion Older Dirt Female Horse. Stopchargingmaria, in 2015, was the last Shuvee winner to go on to win the Breeders' Cup Distaff.

In 2022, the American Graded Stakes Committee upgraded the event back to Grade II.

== Records ==
Speed record:

- 1 mile: 1:34.23 – Society Selection (2005)
- 1 1/16 miles: 1:40.40 – Dance Number (1983)
- 1 1/8 miles: 1:48.94 – Letruska (2020)

Largest Winning Margin:

- 32 1/2 lengths – Paid Up Subscriber (2017)

Most wins:

- No horse has won this race more than once.

Most wins by a jockey:

- 5 – John Velazquez (1998, 2004, 2013, 2016, 2017)

Most wins by a trainer:

- 6 – Todd Pletcher (2011, 2013, 2015, 2016, 2023, 2025

Most wins by an owner:

- 2 – Ogden Phipps (1983, 1988)
- 2 – Eugene V. Klein (1985, 1986)
- 2 – Ogden Mills Phipps (1995, 2004)
- 2 – Eclipse Thoroughbred Partners (2016, 2023)

== Winners ==
Year	Winner	Age	Jockey	Trainer	Owner	Time	Purse	Grade	Ref
At Saratoga – Shuvee Stakes
2026	Fully Subscribed	4	Flavien Prat	Chad C. Brown	Klaravich Stables	1:49.46	$250,000	II	
2025	Leslie’s Rose	4	Irad Ortiz Jr.	Todd A. Pletcher	Whisper Hill Farm	1:50.77	$175,000	II	
2024	Raging Sea	4	Flavien Prat	Chad C. Brown	Alpha Delta Stables	1:51.95	$194,000	II	
2023	Nest	4	Irad Ortiz Jr.	Todd Pletcher	Repole Stable, Eclipse Thoroughbred Partners, Michael House	1:50.72	$186,000	II	
2022	Clairiere	4	Joel Rosario	Steve Asmussen	Stonestreet Stables	1:51.96	$186,000	II	
2021	Royal Flag	5	Joel Rosario	Chad C. Brown	William S. Farish III	1:49.42	$200,000	III	
2020	Letruska	4	Joel Rosario	Fausto Gutierrez	St. George Stable	1:48.94	$125,000	III	
2019	Golden Award	4	Tyler Gaffalione	William I. Mott	Summer Wind Equine	1:49.64	$194,000	III	
2018	Farrell	4	Channing Hill	Wayne M. Catalano	Coffeepot Stables	1:49.35	$200,000	III	
Shuvee Handicap
2017	Paid Up Subscriber	5	John R. Velazquez	Chad C. Brown	Allen Stable & Peter M. Brant	1:51.31	$180,000	III	
2016	Curalina	4	John R. Velazquez	Todd A. Pletcher	Eclipse Thoroughbred Partners	1:49.85	$190,000	III	
2015	Stopchargingmaria	4	Javier Castellano	Todd A. Pletcher	Town and Country Farms	1:49.37	$200,000	III	
2014	Antipathy	4	Irad Ortiz Jr.	Kiaran P. McLaughlin	Godolphin Racing	1:52.80	$200,000	III	
2013	Authenticity	6	John R. Velazquez	Todd A. Pletcher	Padua Stables	1:52.33	$200,000	III	
2012	Race not held								
At Belmont Park
2011	Awesome Maria	4	Javier Castellano	Todd A. Pletcher	Robsham Stables	1:35.19	$147,000	II	
2010	Funny Moon	4	Alan Garcia	Christophe Clement	Mrs. C. Wilson McNeely III	1:36.70	$147,000	II	
2009	Seattle Smooth	4	Ramon A. Dominguez	Anthony W. Dutrow	Mercedes Stable	1:35.94	$150,000	II	
2008	Cowgirls Don't Cry	4	Michael J. Luzzi	Kiaran P. McLaughlin	Jeff Singer	1:37.31	$150,000	II	
2007	Teammate	4	Cornelio Velásquez	H. Allen Jerkens	H. Joseph Allen	1:38.19	$150,000	II	
2006	Take D' Tour	5	Cornelio Velásquez	David Fawkes	Alice Muller	1:36.10	$147,000	II	
2005	Society Selection	4	Eibar Coa	H. Allen Jerkens	Irving & Marjorie Cowan	1:34.23	$196,000	II	
2004	Storm Flag Flying	4	John R. Velazquez	Claude R. McGaughey III	Ogden Mills Phipps et al.	1:36.10	$200,000	II	
2003	Wild Spirit (CHI)	4	Javier Castellano	Robert J. Frankel	Sumaya U.S. Stable	1:34.51	$200,000	II	
2002	Shiny Band	4	Robbie Davis	H. Allen Jerkens	Bohemia Stable	1:34.95	$200,000	II	
2001	Apple of Kent	5	Richard Migliore	John C. Kimmel	Juddmonte Farms	1:35.16	$200,000	II	
2000	Beautiful Pleasure	5	Jorge F. Chavez	John T. Ward Jr.	John C. Oxley	1:35.65	$200,000	II	
1999	Catinca	4	Richard Migliore	John C. Kimmel	Robert K. Waxman	1:34.38	$150,000	II	
1998	Colonial Minstrel	4	John R. Velazquez	Mark A. Hennig	Edward P. Evans	1:36.20	$150,000	II	
1997	Hidden Lake	4	Richard Migliore	John C. Kimmel	Robert N. Clay	1:35.27	$150,000	II	
1996	Clear Mandate	4	Julie Krone	George R. Arnold II	G. Watts Humphrey Jr.	1:35.01	$153,300	I	
1995	§ Inside Information	4	José A. Santos	Claude R. McGaughey III	Ogden Mills Phipps	1:35.10	$129,689	I	
1994	Sky Beauty	4	Mike E. Smith	H. Allen Jerkens	Georgia E. Hofmann	1:40.60	$150,000	I	
1993	Turnback the Alarm	4	Chris Antley	William V. Terrill	Valley View Farm	1:43.11	$150,000	I	
1992	Missy's Mirage	4	Eddie Maple	H. Allen Jerkens	Middletown Stable	1:40.74	$171,600	I	
1991	A Wild Ride	4	Mike E. Smith	D. Wayne Lukas	Yoshida Zeyna	1:42.40	$171,900	I	
1990	Tis Juliet	4	Richard Migliore	D. Wayne Lukas	Calumet Farm	1:43.00	$171,300	I	
1989	Banker's Lady	4	Ángel Cordero Jr.	Philip M. Hauswald	Edward A. Cox Jr.	1:40.80	$174,300	I	
1988	Personal Ensign	4	Randy Romero	Claude R. McGaughey III	Ogden Phipps	1:41.60	$170,100	I	
1987	Ms. Eloise	4	Robbie Davis	Philip G. Johnson	Margaret E. Grimm	1:41.80	$179,700	I	
1986	Lady's Secret	4	Pat Day	D. Wayne Lukas	Eugene V. Klein	1:41.80	$113,800	I	
1985	Life's Magic	4	Jorge Velásquez	D. Wayne Lukas	Eugene V. Klein	1:42.40	$172,000	II	
1984	Queen of Song	5	Sam Maple	Claude R. McGaughey III	Parrish Hill Farm	1:43.00	$121,400	II	
1983	Dance Number	4	Ángel Cordero Jr.	Angel Penna Sr.	Ogden Phipps	1:40.40	$82,500	II	
1982	Anti Lib	4	Jacinto Vásquez	David A. Whiteley	Pen-Y-Bryn Farm	1:41.60	$55,700	II	
1981	Chain Bracelet	4	Ruben Hernandez	James W. Maloney Jr.	Shirley H. Taylor	1:42.80	$55,500	II	
1980	Alada	4	Jeffrey Fell	Robert G. van Wert	Meadow Stable	1:43.00	$54,100	II	
1979	Pearl Necklace	5	Jeffrey Fell	Roger Laurin	Reginald N. Webster	1:41.40	$53,800	II	
1978	One Sum	4	Ruben Hernandez	Luis Barrera	Charles T. Wilson Jr.	1:44.00	$53,000	II	
1977	† Mississippi Mud	4	Jacinto Vásquez	Charles Peoples	Mrs. Bayard Sharp	1:43.60	$54,600		
1976	Proud Delta	4	Jorge Velásquez	Peter M. Howe	Montpelier Stable	1:35.00	$56,350		

Notes:
§ Ran as an entry
† In the 1977 running, Secret Lanvin finished first but was disqualified for interference and was placed third. Mississippi Mud was declared the winner.

== See also ==
List of American and Canadian Graded races
