= Heavenly Prize =

American Thoroughbred racehorse

- Sire: Seeking the Gold
- Grandsire: Mr. Prospector
- Dam: Oh What a Dance
- Damsire: Nijinsky II
- Sex: Mare
- Foaled: February 17, 1991
- Died: 2013 (age 22)
- Country: United States
- Colour: Bay
- Breeder: Ogden Phipps
- Owner: Ogden Phipps
- Trainer: Claude R. McGaughey
- Record: 18: 9-6-3
- Earnings: $1,825,940

Major wins
- Frizette Stakes (1993); Alabama Stakes (1994); Gazelle Handicap (1994); Beldame Stakes (1994); Apple Blossom Handicap (1995); Hempstead Handicap (1995); Go for Wand Stakes (1995); John A. Morris Handicap (1995)

Awards
- American Champion Three-Year-Old Filly (1994)

Honors
- National Museum of Racing and Hall of Fame (2018); Heavenly Prize Invitational Stakes (Listed) at Aqueduct Racetrack since 2017

Heavenly Prize (February 17, 1991 – 2013) was a champion American Thoroughbred racehorse. She was a Grade I winner at ages two, three and four, and never finished out of the money. She was named the American Champion Three-Year-Old Filly of 1994 after winning the Alabama, Gazelle and Beldame Stakes, plus finishing second in the Breeders' Cup Distaff. Her four-year-old campaign was equally noteworthy, with wins in the Apple Blossom, Hempstead (now the Ogden Phipps), Go for Wand and John A. Morris (now the Personal Ensign). She was inducted into the National Museum of Racing and Hall of Fame in 2018.

== Background ==
Heavenly Prize was bred in Kentucky by Ogden Phipps, for whom she raced as a homebred. Over a lifetime involved in the sport, Phipps had owned and bred multiple champions including Buckpasser, Easy Goer and Personal Ensign, though he somewhat notoriously lost a coin flip that decided the ownership of Secretariat. Heavenly Prize was sired by Seeking the Gold, another major stakes winner for the Phipps stable known for his gameness and consistency. Heavenly Prize's dam was the unraced mare Oh What a Dance, a full sister to Breeders' Cup Sprint winner Dancing Spree. Heavenly Prize's second dam, Blitey, became a “blue hen” for the Phipps family – Blitey herself produced four stakes winners, and her female-line descendants have accounted for a further 25 stakes winners.

She was trained by Claude "Shug" McGaughey. For her first eight races, her jockey was Mike Smith. Pat Day rode her in her final ten starts.

== Racing career ==
Heavenly Prize made three starts at age two, winning twice. She won her first start on September 15, 1993 – a maiden special weight race at Belmont Park – by 9 1/2 lengths. McGaughey had another potential star filly in his stable at the time, Inside Information, who won a different maiden race on the same day. Heavenly Prize won in a more dominating fashion, so McGaughey decided to enter her in the Frizette Stakes on October 16, while Inside Information focused on shorter races. The two fillies, both of whom were eventually inducted into the Hall of Fame, did not meet on the racetrack until the end of their four-year-old campaign.

In the Frizette, Heavenly Prize "romped" to a seven-length victory. She went off as the favorite in the Breeders' Cup Juvenile Fillies, but finished third behind Phone Chatter.

She made her first start as a three-year-old on March 12, 1994, finishing second in the What a Summer Stakes. After some time off to recover from a virus, she finished second in the Prioress Stakes on June 18 and third in the Test Stakes on July 23. She then turned in one of her best performances in the Alabama Stakes at Saratoga on August 13 by beating heavy favorite Lakeway by seven lengths. She followed up by winning the Gazelle Stakes by 6 1/2 lengths despite being trapped behind three horses as they entered the stretch. After jockey Mike Smith moved her to the outside, "she dropped her head and just kept going." She completed the 1 1/8 miles in a time of 1:47 1/5, tied for the second-fastest running in the history of the race. Mike E. Smith then gave up the mount on Heavenly Prize to ride the Hall of Fame champion Sky Beauty.

On October 8, Heavenly Prize scored her third consecutive Grade I win in the Beldame Stakes by 6 lengths. With only three rivals in a weight-for-age race, she would have been such a prohibitive favorite that the race was run as an exhibition: no betting was allowed. She finished the year with a second-place finish in the Breeders' Cup Distaff with Pat Day in the saddle, coming from off of the slow pace and coming up a neck short to longshot One Dreamer. Despite that loss, she was named the American Champion Three-Year-Old Filly.

At age four, she started seven times and won four (all Grade I), and was second in the other three. She started her campaign with a second-place finish to Halo America in the Oaklawn Breeders' Cup Handicap on April 2. She then reeled off four straight Grade I wins. In the Apple Blossom on April 21, she defeated Halo America and future Hall of Famer Paseana. Returning to Belmont Park for the Hempstead Handicap on June 18, she defeated yet another future Hall of Famer, Sky Beauty. Shipping next to Saratoga, she won the Go For Wand on July 23 by launching a move on the far turn that took her from 8 1/2 lengths behind to the lead within a furlong. She continued to draw away "effortlessly, relentlessly" to win by 11 lengths. On August 20, she followed up by winning the John A. Morris Handicap by 8 1/2 lengths despite carrying 127 pounds – from 13 to 20 pounds more than any of her rivals. She finished the year by finishing second in the Beldame to Serena's Song and second in the Distaff to stablemate Inside Information.

Heavenly Prize made one start at age five, taking on male horses in the Donn Handicap. She finished third behind Cigar, who recorded his thirteenth win in a row.

== Retirement ==
Heavenly Prize was retired to broodmare duty in 1996. She produced eight foals, seven of which were winners. Her best foal was Good Reward, who won multiple Grade I races on the turf. Another foal, Pure Prize, was a Grade II winner and successful sire. Her daughter Just Reward became a Grade I producer.

Heavenly Prize died in 2013 at Claiborne Farm in Kentucky. She was inducted into the National Museum of Racing and Hall of Fame in 2018. McGaughey commented that he most proud by her consistency. "It was fun to be able to watch her draw off the way she did," he said, "and I'm just proud that she was able to do that at 2, 3, and 4."

== Pedigree ==
Pedigree of Heavenly Prize, bay mare, February 17, 1991
Sire Seeking the Gold 1985	Mr. Prospector	Raise a Native	Native Dancer
Sire Seeking the Gold 1985	Mr. Prospector	Raise a Native	Raise You
Sire Seeking the Gold 1985	Mr. Prospector	Gold Digger	Nashua
Sire Seeking the Gold 1985	Mr. Prospector	Gold Digger	Sequence
Sire Seeking the Gold 1985	Con Game; 1974	Buckpasser	Tom Fool
Sire Seeking the Gold 1985	Con Game; 1974	Buckpasser	Busanda
Sire Seeking the Gold 1985	Con Game; 1974	Broadway	Hasty Road
Sire Seeking the Gold 1985	Con Game; 1974	Broadway	Flitabout
Dam Oh What a Dance 1987	Nijinsky II; 1967	Northern Dancer	Nearctic
Dam Oh What a Dance 1987	Nijinsky II; 1967	Northern Dancer	Natalma
Dam Oh What a Dance 1987	Nijinsky II; 1967	Flaming Page	Bull Page
Dam Oh What a Dance 1987	Nijinsky II; 1967	Flaming Page	Flaring Top
Dam Oh What a Dance 1987	Blitey; 1976	Riva Ridge	First Landing
Dam Oh What a Dance 1987	Blitey; 1976	Riva Ridge	Iberia
Dam Oh What a Dance 1987	Blitey; 1976	Lady Pitt	Sword Dancer
Dam Oh What a Dance 1987	Blitey; 1976	Lady Pitt	Rock Drill (family: 20-b)
