= Storm Flag Flying =

American Thoroughbred racehorse

- Sire: Storm Cat
- Grandsire: Storm Bird
- Dam: My Flag
- Damsire: Easy Goer
- Sex: Mare
- Foaled: 2000
- Country: USA
- Colour: Dark Bay
- Breeder: Phipps Stable
- Owner: Ogden Mills Phipps
- Trainer: Claude R. McGaughey III
- Record: 14: 7-3-3
- Earnings: $1,951,828

Major wins
- Matron Stakes (2002); Frizette Stakes (2002); Shuvee Handicap (2004); Personal Ensign Handicap (2004); Breeders' Cup wins: Breeders' Cup Juvenile Fillies (2002)

Awards
- U.S. Champion 2-Yr-Old Filly (2002)
- Last updated on October 21, 2006

Storm Flag Flying (foaled April 11, 2000 at Claiborne Farm in Paris, Kentucky – January 22, 2016) was an American Champion Thoroughbred racehorse who won the Breeders' Cup Juvenile Fillies in 2002.

== Background ==
Storm Flag Flying was a bay mare bred in Kentucky by the Phipps Stable, and it was operated at the time by Ogden Phipps. She was by leading sire Storm Cat, whose stud fee at the time was $200,000, later increased to $500,000. Storm Flag Flying's dam was My Flag, by champion Easy Goer and out of another champion, the undefeated Personal Ensign. Personal Ensign, My Flag and Storm Flag Flying all won Breeders' Cup races, a rare triple even in the sire line and unique for a female family.

Her dam was called "as temperamental a filly as ever put gray in a trainer's hair". Storm Flag Flying was somewhat easier to manage, though she sometimes raced erratically and did not respond well to the whip.

Ogden Phipps died in April 2002 before the filly started racing, so she was raced by his son Ogden Mills Phipps with the family's famed black and cherry silks. She was trained by Claude "Shug" McGaughey, who had also trained Easy Goer, My Flag and Personal Ensign for the Phipps family.

== Racing career ==
=== 2002: two-year-old season ===
Storm Flag Flying made her racing debut on August 18, 2002, in a maiden special weight race at Saratoga. She won despite racing greenly, meaning she switched leads several times in the stretch and did not maintain a straight path. In her second start on September 15, she stepped up to Grade I company in the Matron Stakes and "demolished" the field by 12 3/4 lengths despite shying at the whip. In her third start in the Frizette Stakes on October 5, she raced more professionally and won by two lengths. McGaughey said, "I didn't want (John Velazquez) to ride her hard today, so this race was probably easier for her than the last, when she made mistakes and he had to get into her."

Storm Flag Flying entered the Breeders' Cup Juvenile Fillies on October 26 as the heavy favorite. She moved to the lead at the top of the homestretch but was passed by another filly, Composure. Storm Flag Flying fought back and won by half a length. Her undefeated record earned her the Eclipse Award for Outstanding 2-Year-Old Filly with 226 out of 227 votes.

=== 2003: three-year-old season ===
Storm Flag Flying was originally being trained for the Kentucky Oaks for her three-year-old campaign, but McGaughey decided not to rush her. "Right now we're just waiting on her," he said in March. She finally made her seasonal debut in the Comely Stakes on April 18 at Aqueduct Racetrack, finishing second. McGaughey decided to skip the Kentucky Oaks and pointed instead towards the Acorn Stakes at Belmont Park in June. Despite training well for the race, Storm Flag Flying threw in the worst performance of her career, finishing next to last. A few weeks later McGaughey announced, "We discovered a small - and I mean very small - fracture of her right hind cannon bone. She was never lame, but I knew something wasn't right. I couldn't figure it out, so we sent her to Rood and Riddle."

=== 2004: four-year-old season ===
Storm Flag Flying rebounded in 2004, winning three races, including a victory over Hall of Fame champion Azeri in the Grade I Personal Ensign Handicap (a race named for her grandmother) and the Shuvee Handicap. Bad luck in the 2004 Breeders' Cup Distaff saw Storm Flag Flying running last and trapped on the rail midway through the race. When she finally broke through the horses in front of her, she made a strong run down the stretch but finished second after she ran out of ground before she could catch the winner, Ashado.

== Breeding record ==
She was retired to broodmare service at Claiborne Farm at the end of her racing career. As of October 2016, she is the dam of 3 winners out of 6 starters. Her foals include:

- a 2006 A.P. Indy colt named Colors Flying – 1 win from 7 starts
- a 2010 Smart Strike filly named Beat the Drums – winless in 2 starts
- a 2011 Unbridled's Song filly named Sea Trial – 1 win from 8 starts
- a 2012 Street Cry filly named Playtime – winless in 8 starts
- a 2013 Candy Ride colt named Revved Up – 2 wins from 8 starts
- a 2014 Street Cry colt named Strident – winless after 1 start

== Pedigree ==
Storm Flag Flying was the result of over fifty years of breeding by the Phipps family, who raced many of the horses that appear in her pedigree, including Bold Ruler, Buckpasser, Numbered Account, Relaxing, Easy Goer, Private Account, Personal Ensign and My Flag. She descends from one of the most distinguished female families of modern times, that of Grecian Banner – a Phipps homebred and the 1988 Kentucky Broodmare of the Year. Grecian Banner produced Grade I winner and important sire Personal Flag in 1983 and his full-sister Personal Ensign in 1984. Personal Ensign would retire unbeaten after 13 starts including the 1988 Breeders' Cup Distaff, and then produced not only My Flag but Grade I winner Miner's Mark and Grade I-placed Our Emblem, sire of Kentucky Derby winner War Emblem. Personal Ensign was the 1996 Kentucky Broodmare of the Year.

Pedigree of Storm Flag Flying, dark bay mare, 2000
Sire Storm Cat 1983	Storm Bird; 1978	Northern Dancer	Nearctic
Sire Storm Cat 1983	Storm Bird; 1978	Northern Dancer	Natalma
Sire Storm Cat 1983	Storm Bird; 1978	South Ocean	New Providence
Sire Storm Cat 1983	Storm Bird; 1978	South Ocean	Shining Sun
Sire Storm Cat 1983	Terlingua; 1976	Secretariat	Bold Ruler
Sire Storm Cat 1983	Terlingua; 1976	Secretariat	Somethingroyal
Sire Storm Cat 1983	Terlingua; 1976	Crimson Saint	Crimson Satan
Sire Storm Cat 1983	Terlingua; 1976	Crimson Saint	Bolero Rose
Dam My Flag 1993	Easy Goer; 1986	Alydar	Raise A Native
Dam My Flag 1993	Easy Goer; 1986	Alydar	Sweet Tooth
Dam My Flag 1993	Easy Goer; 1986	Relaxing	Buckpasser
Dam My Flag 1993	Easy Goer; 1986	Relaxing	Marking Time
Dam My Flag 1993	Personal Ensign; 1984	Private Account	Damascus
Dam My Flag 1993	Personal Ensign; 1984	Private Account	Numbered Account
Dam My Flag 1993	Personal Ensign; 1984	Grecian Banner	Hoist The Flag
Dam My Flag 1993	Personal Ensign; 1984	Grecian Banner	Dorine (family: 6-a)
