= Claiborne Farm =

Thoroughbred racing and breeding operation

Coordinates: 38°11′25.5″N 84°14′42.3″W

- Thoroughbred mares and foals grazing in a paddock at Claiborne Farm
- Type: Horse breeding farm & Thoroughbred racing stable
- Industry: Thoroughbred horse racing
- Founded: 1910
- Headquarters: Paris, Kentucky, United States
- Key people: Arthur B. Hancock (founding owner 1875–1957); Arthur B. "Bull " Hancock, Jr. (owner 1957–1972); Seth W. Hancock (manager/owner 1972-2015); Seth W. "Walker" Hancock, Jr. (manager/owner since 2015)

Claiborne Farm is a thoroughbred horse breeding operation near Paris, Kentucky. It was established in 1910 by Arthur B. Hancock, owner of Ellerslie Stud in Albemarle County, Virginia, and has been operated by members of his family ever since.

== Owners ==
- Arthur B. Hancock (1875–1957)
- Arthur B. "Bull" Hancock, Jr. (1910–1972)
- Seth W. Hancock (b. 1949)
- Seth W. "Walker" Hancock, Jr. (b. 1989)
- Arthur B. Hancock III (1943–2026) owns Stone Farm, a breeding operation nearby.

Arthur B. Hancock imported breeding stock from Europe that made Claiborne Farm an international leader in breeding, sales, and racing. He bred Vigil, the 1923 Preakness Stakes winner. Among his famous sires was Sir Gallahad, purchased from France, who was the leading sire in 1930, 1933, 1934, and 1940 and who sired 1930 U.S. Triple Crown winner Gallant Fox. Claiborne Farm was part of a 1936 consortium that imported Blenheim from England and in 1944 purchased Princequillo, who became the leading U.S. sire for 1957 and 1958.

Claiborne Farm won the Eclipse Award for Outstanding Breeder in 1979 and again in 1984. It has been visited twice by Queen Elizabeth II of the United Kingdom, who owned racehorses herself. The farm was home to all the major horses owned by the Phipps family, including Orb, the 2013 Kentucky Derby winner. Secretariat was syndicated by Seth Hancock for breeding purposes and stood at stud at Claiborne Farm from the conclusion of his racing career at the end of 1973 until his death in 1989.

Racing historian Edward L. Bowen considers Claiborne Farm one of the most influential American breeding operations, due to the many breeders who benefited from its horses and the length of time that influence has lasted.

In 1973 the Keeneland Association honored Claiborne Farm with its Mark of Distinction for their contribution to Keeneland and the Thoroughbred industry.

== Cemeteries ==
=== Main Division ===
Reviewer's behind the main office at Claiborne Farm

- Ambiorix (1946–1975)
- Blenheim (1927–1958)
- Bold Ruler (1954–1971)
- Buckpasser (1963–1978)
- Court Martial (1944–1966)
- Chatterton (1919–1933) – Unmarked
- Double Jay (1944–1972)
- Gallant Fox (1927–1954)
- Gamely (1964–1975)
- Herbager (1956–1976)
- Hoist The Flag (1968–1980)
- Johnstown (1936–1950)
- Mr. Prospector (1970–1999)
- Nantallah (1943–1972) - Unknown location
- Nasrullah (1940–1959)
- Nijinsky II (1967–1992)
- Princequillo (1940–1964)
- Pulpit (1994–2012)
- Reviewer (1966–1977)
- Riva Ridge (1969–1985)
- Round Table (1954–1987)
- Secretariat (1970–1989)
- Star Hawk (1913–1925) – Unmarked
- Stimulus (1922–1945) – Unmarked
- Swale (1981–1984)
- Tulyar (1943–1972) – Unknown location
- War Cloud (1915–1923) – Unmarked

=== Marchmont Division ===
A small portion of Claiborne's Marchmont Cemetery division

Stallions

- Ack Ack (1966–1990)
- Boundaries (1990–2012)
- Conquistador Cielo (1979–2002)
- Cox's Ridge (1974–1998)
- Damascus (1964–1995)
- Danzig (1977–2006)
- Devil's Bag (1981–2005)
- Drone (1966–1987)
- Easy Goer (1986–1994)
- Forli (1963–1988)
- Hawaii (1964–1990)
- Majestic Light (1973–2000)
- Out of Place (1987–2010)
- Private Account (1976–2004)
- Private Terms (1985–2010)
- Sir Gallahad (1920–1949)
- Sir Ivor (1965–1995)
- Tom Rolfe (1962–1989)
- Topsider (1974–1992)
- Unbridled (1987–2001)

Mares

- Alluvial (1969–1994)
- Banshee Breeze (1995–2001)
- Con Game (1974–2001)
- Christmas Past (1979–2008)
- Dearly Precious (1975–1992)
- File (1976–1993)
- Foreseer (1969–1998)
- Heavenly Prize (1991–2013)
- Korveya (1982–2013)
- Lady Liberty (1999–2017)
- Marguerite (1920–1945)
- Moccasin (1963–1986)
- My Flag (1993–2014)
- Narrate (1980–2010)
- Number (1979–1997)
- Numbered Account (1969–1997)
- Obeah (2003–2006)
- Personal Ensign (1984–2010)
- Pine Island (2003–2006)
- Preach (1989–2000)
- Pure Profit (1982–1999)
- Qui Royalty (1977–1999)
- Relaxing (1976–1999)
- Ruffian (1972–1975), – Originally buried at Belmont Park, remains relocated to Claiborne in 2023
- Smuggler (2002–2015)
- Special (1963–1979)
- State (1974–1993)
- Stary Dreamer (1994–2018)
- Steel Maiden (1983–2013)
- Storm Flag Flying (2000–2016)
- Thong (1964–1986)
- Tuerta (1970–1985)
- Wild Applause (1981–2003)

== Stallions ==
Stallions standing at Claiborne Farm as of the 2026 breeding season include:

- Annapolis – $12,500
- Blame – $25,000
- Bright Future – $10,000
- Mindframe – TBD
- Prince of Monaco – $30,000
- Silver Slate – $7,500
- War Front – Private
