= My Flag =

American-bred Thoroughbred racehorse

- My Flag's grave at Claiborne Farm
- Sire: Easy Goer
- Grandsire: Alydar
- Dam: Personal Ensign
- Damsire: Private Account
- Sex: Filly
- Foaled: 1993
- Country: USA
- Colour: Chestnut
- Breeder: Ogden Phipps
- Owner: Ogden Phipps
- Trainer: Claude R. McGaughey III
- Record: 20:6-3-4
- Earnings: $1,557,057

Major wins
- Breeders' Cup Juvenile Fillies (1995); Bonnie Miss Stakes (1996); Ashland Stakes (1996); Coaching Club American Oaks (1996); Gazelle Handicap (1996)
- Last updated on October 21, 2006

My Flag (March 25, 1993 – April 12, 2014) was an American Thoroughbred racehorse. She was one of the leading American fillies of her generation, winning the Coaching Club American Oaks and finishing third against colts in the Belmont Stakes in 1996. My Flag was euthanized April 12, 2014, at age of 21, due to foaling complications for her bay colt by Bernardini.

== Background ==
Born at Claiborne Farm in Paris, Kentucky, bred and owned by Ogden Phipps, she was trained by National Museum of Racing and Hall of Fame trainer Claude R. McGaughey III. She was sired by the 1988 Champion Two-Year Old Male, Hall of Famer Easy Goer, and was foaled by the undefeated champion race mare and Hall of Famer Personal Ensign. During her racing days, My Flag was known to have a "diva" personality, because she did not like to be around other horses. To calm her uneasy temperament, she would often be led out of the saddling area before the rest of the horses.

== Racing career ==
My Flag won four Grade 1 stakes races during her three years of racing, the biggest being the 1995 Breeders' Cup Juvenile Fillies. Her victory, coming from off the pace on a muddy race track to collar the second-place finisher at the wire, was strikingly similar to Personal Ensign's 1988 Breeders' Cup Distaff triumph. My Flag collected three more G1 victories during her three-year-old campaign in 1996, in which she captured the Ashland Stakes, the Coaching Club American Oaks, and the Gazelle Handicap. She also finished a very credible third against males in that year's Belmont Stakes.

My Flag was retired to broodmare services at Claiborne Farm after an undistinguished four-year-old campaign in 1997.

== Broodmare career ==
Much like Personal Ensign, My Flag has achieved great success as a broodmare. Her first foal is the graded stakes-placed Storm Cat filly, On Parade, which is the dam of multiple graded-stakes winner Parading. Her second foal, another Storm Cat filly named Storm Flag Flying, won the 2002 Breeders' Cup Juvenile Fillies and was honored as that year's Champion Two-Year-Old Filly. She is also the dam of stakes-winning filly With Flying Colors and a stakes-placed colt named Leading The Parade, both sired by A.P. Indy.
