= Personal Ensign =

American-bred Thoroughbred racehorse

- Personal Ensign's grave at Claiborne Farm
- Sire: Private Account
- Grandsire: Damascus
- Dam: Grecian Banner
- Damsire: Hoist The Flag
- Sex: Mare
- Foaled: April 27, 1984
- Country: United States
- Colour: Bay
- Breeder: Ogden Phipps
- Owner: Ogden Phipps
- Trainer: Claude McGaughey
- Record: 13: 13-0-0
- Earnings: $1,679,880

Major wins
- Frizette Stakes (1986); Rare Perfume Stakes (1987); Beldame Stakes (1987, 1988); Shuvee Handicap (1988); Hempstead Handicap (1988); Molly Pitcher Handicap (1988); Whitney Handicap (1988); Maskette Handicap (1988) Breeders' Cup wins: Breeders' Cup Distaff (1988)

Awards
- American Champion Older Female Horse (1988); Kentucky Broodmare of the Year (1996)

Honours
- U.S. Racing Hall of Fame (1993) #48 - Top 100 U.S. Racehorses of the 20th Century; Personal Ensign Handicap at Saratoga Race Course

Personal Ensign (April 27, 1984 – April 8, 2010) was a champion Thoroughbred racehorse who retired undefeated with 13 wins. At the time, this was the longest winning streak for a horse at the elite level of American racing in 80 years. She defeated Kentucky Derby winner Winning Colors and Kentucky Oaks winner Goodbye Halo in her last start in the 1988 Breeders' Cup Distaff to finish up her racing career.

Personal Ensign showed her class early by winning the Grade I Frizette Stakes at age two, but was subsequently injured. After missing nearly a year of racing, she returned in September of her three-year-old season to win four races, including the Grade I Beldame Stakes. As a four-year-old, she won seven races, all but one of which was at the Grade I level, including a victory in the prestigious Whitney Handicap against male horses. She ended her season by repeating in the Beldame and then taking the Breeders' Cup Distaff. For this feat, she was voted the 1988 Eclipse Award as the American Champion Older Female Horse.

In retirement, Personal Ensign matched her success on the track as a broodmare, being named the 1996 Kentucky Broodmare of the Year. Her daughter My Flag emulated her by winning a Breeders' Cup race and producing another Breeders' Cup winner, Storm Flag Flying. Her son Our Emblem sired Kentucky Derby winner War Emblem.

== Background ==
Personal Ensign was a bay mare who was bred in Kentucky by Ogden Phipps, for whom she raced as a homebred. The Phipps family had long been a major factor in the horse racing industry, and Phipps himself had bred multiple champions including Buckpasser and Easy Goer. Produced from a mating of Phipps' homebred stallion Private Account and the mare Grecian Banner, Personal Ensign was a full sister to Personal Flag. Their combined exploits in 1988 led Grecian Banner being named Kentucky Broodmare of the Year, a feat Personal Ensign later also accomplished. Grecian Banner was out of Dorine, a two-time champion filly in Argentina.

Personal Ensign was trained by Claude (Shug) McGaughey, and Randy Romero was her regular jockey. She behaved professionally on the racecourse but could be temperamental on the backstretch.

== Racing career ==
=== 1986: two-year-old campaign ===
Personal Ensign made her first start on September 28 in a maiden special weight race at Belmont Park. She trailed the field early but made a strong closing drive to win by 12 3/4 lengths. Her time of 1:22 4/5 for seven furlongs was three-fifths of a second faster than the same day's running of the Grade I Matron Stakes, won by Tappiano.

Personal Ensign then made her stakes debut in the Grade I Frizette Stakes on October 13. She was the 3-10 favorite in a field that was reduced down to just three horses after the scratches of Sea Basque and Tappiano. Although Personal Ensign was known for her late-running style, in this race she was pushed early to prevent the front-runner Collins from getting an easy lead. She and Collins raced head to head for the final half mile, with Personal Ensign prevailing by a head. "Last time, she won in a gallop," said McGaughey. "This time, she had to belly down and fight."

Personal Ensign was being pointed towards the Breeders' Cup Juvenile Fillies, a race in which she would have been the favorite, but became lame after an apparently routine workout on October 26. Tests revealed that she had broken the pastern bone on her right hind leg, an injury that would have been career-ending and perhaps life-threatening just a few years earlier. However, thanks to advances in veterinary surgical techniques, she was operated on by Dr. Larry Bramlage, who inserted five screws into the bone. Bramlage later cited her as one of his personal favorites over his long career. "She was important not only to me, but also to the profession," said Bramlage. "She was really the first prominent horse that showed that not only could you save those horses for breeding if you did a good job with internal fixation but some of them then could come back and perform well."

=== 1987: three-year-old campaign ===
After recovering from surgery, Personal Ensign finally returned to the racetrack on September 6, 1987, in an allowance race at Belmont Park. Going off as the 7-10 favorite, she won by 3 3/4 lengths. On September 24, she won another allowance race, this time by 7 3/4 lengths. She then stepped up in class to win the Rare Perfume Stakes on October 10 by 4 3/4 lengths.

Personal Ensign made her next start on October 18 in the Beldame Stakes run at Belmont Park over 1 1/4 miles, where she faced older horses for the first time, plus several of the leading three-year-old fillies in the country. She was the second betting choice behind the entry of Coup de Fusil, who had won three straight Grade I races, and Clabber Girl. It was the only time in her career that she was not the favorite. In a change from her normal running style, she stayed close to the pace and took the lead after six furlongs, opening the lead to four lengths in mid-stretch. She won by 2 1/4 lengths despite tiring late. "I thought she would go a distance, but you don't know until you try it," said McGaughey. "I had no idea how she would run, coming back eight days after the other race. She has never run against this kind."

"Riding her is like pushing a button," said Romero. "She is the fastest filly I ever rode. If she gets in trouble, she is so fast she can get out of it."

Her connections considered sending her to the 1987 Breeders' Cup, but ultimately decided against it because the event was held that year on November 21, much later than the usual date at the beginning of November. The decision possibly cost Personal Ensign the title of three-year-old champion filly: she finished second in the Eclipse Award voting to Sacahuista, who won the Distaff.

=== 1988: four-year-old campaign ===
In 1988, Personal Ensign won all seven of her starts, including the Shuvee Handicap, the Hempstead Stakes, the Maskette Stakes, and the Beldame Stakes —all prestigious Grade I races against fillies and mares. At Saratoga, she defeated males in the historic Whitney Handicap. Her swan song was a nose victory over Kentucky Derby winner Winning Colors in the Breeders' Cup Distaff, a race that is often referred to as the most exciting finish in Breeders' Cup history.

Personal Ensign made her four-year-old debut on May 15, 1988, in the Shuvee Handicap at Belmont Park. She went off as the 7-10 favorite in a field of six despite the seven-month layoff and carrying top weight of 121 pounds. She broke slowly, then moved into third along the backstretch. She took the lead turning into the stretch then drew off to win by 1 3/4 lengths.

Personal Ensign's next start was on June 11 at Belmont Park in the Hempstead Handicap, a race subsequently renamed in her owner's honor. She stalked the early pace then made a strong run down the stretch to win by seven lengths. Her time for 1 1/8 miles was an excellent 1:47 3/5. She then made the first start of her career away from Belmont Park in the Molly Pitcher Stakes at Monmouth Park on July 4, winning comfortably by eight lengths.

She then shipped to Saratoga in upstate New York for the Whitney Handicap on August 6, facing male horses for the first time. The race attracted only two other horses, multiple stakes winners Gulch (Metropolitan Handicap) and King's Swan (Tom Fool Handicap). Over a sloppy track that favored front runners, Personal Ensign trailed the field by about four lengths for the first five furlongs, then started to make up ground around the turn. After completing the mile in 1:35 3/5, she got her head in front and continued to draw away, winning by 1 1/2 lengths over Gulch. She completed the nine furlongs in 1:47 4/5. "I can now say she is the best horse I ever road," said Romero. "She ran a great race."

It was her tenth win in a row, matching the streak of Ruffian before the latter filly broke down in her final start. It also moved her to the top of the NTRA polling for Horse of the Year.

Personal Ensign made her next start in the Maskette Stakes over a distance of one mile at Belmont on September 10, where her main rival was Winning Colors, who had won the 1988 Kentucky Derby. Winning Colors was coming off a three-month layoff but was also carrying seven pounds less than Personal Ensign. She was also the only "speed" horse in the field, and as expected went to the early lead. She set a fast pace of 0:45 1/5 for the first half-mile, opening a large lead on the rest of the field. "When she got that far in front," said McGaughey, "I was worried."

Around the turn, Personal Ensign began to close ground and trailed by just two lengths after the six furlongs was completed in 1:09 1/5. In the top of the stretch, she moved alongside Winning Colors but the other filly responded to the challenge. The two dueled for the remaining eighth of a mile until Personal Ensign finally pulled ahead in the final strides to win by three-quarters of a length. "They both made me proud today, especially my filly," said Romero. "A mile isn't even her best distance. I just let her run her race and knew she would get the job done."

On October 16, Personal Ensign entered the Beldame Stakes to defend her victory in the previous year's race. She was "routinely brilliant" on her way to a 5 1/2 length win, stalking the early pace and then opening up in the stretch. The fans at Belmont gave her a standing ovation.

Personal Ensign made her final start in the Breeders' Cup Distaff at Churchill Downs on November 5. The field included Winning Colors and Goodbye Halo, who had won several major three-year-old filly races while Winning Colors was racing against the colts. Winning Colors went to the lead and set moderate fractions, allowing her to conserve energy. The track was muddy and Personal Ensign did not handle it well, dropping far back and striding cautiously for her footing. McGaughey said to a friend, "Not today... She's beaten."

As they turned into the stretch though, Personal Ensign swung to the center of the track, switched leads and finally hit her best stride. With an eighth of a mile remaining, she was still four lengths behind but Winning Colors was tiring. Goodbye Halo was also moving into contention and the three moved ever closer together. As they neared the finish line, Personal Ensign overtook first Goodbye Halo and then Winning Colors, winning in the final stride by a nose over the latter. The crowd erupted and McGaughey was both jubilant and relieved. "Undefeated," he said. "One of the most courageous performances I've ever seen."

"What's so good about her," said Romero, "she don't want to get beat. She's determined to get the job done, and that's what she did today."

The race drew superlatives from many observers. Edward Bowen, editor-in-chief of the Blood-Horse magazine, wrote, "It was a three-filly finish that left its witnesses uplifted and drained at the same time, a moment that leapt fully grown into history." Steven Crist of the New York Times named it his racing moment of the year, adding "It might be another 80 years before racing offers so stirring a moment." William Nack, writing for Sports Illustrated, called it "one of the most inspired and inspiring moments in recent memory." D. Wayne Lukas, who trained Winning Colors, congratulated McGaughey, saying "That's what it's all about! That's what racing's about!"

Personal Ensign was retired following the Breeders' Cup as the first undefeated champion in American racing in over 80 years. Colin, who raced in 1907 and 1908, was the last such champion, winning all fifteen of his starts.

Personal Ensign was voted the Eclipse Award for Outstanding Older Female Horse. She finished second in the balloting for Horse of the Year to Alysheba.

== Race Record ==
Date	Track	Distance	Race	Grade	Finish	Margin	Time
9/28/1986	Belmont Park	7 Furlongs	Maiden		1	12 3/4 lengths	1:24 3/5
10/13/1986	Belmont Park	8 Furlongs	Frizette Stakes	I	1	head	1:36 2/5
9/6/1987	Belmont Park	7 Furlongs	Allowance		1	3 3/4 lengths	1:23 1/5
9/24/1987	Belmont Park	1 Mile	Allowance		1	7 3/4 lengths	1:36 1/5
10/10/1987	Belmont Park	1 Mile	Rare Perfume Handicap	II	1	4 3/4 lengths	1:36 3/5
10/18/1987	Belmont Park	1 1/4 Miles	Beldame Stakes	I	1	2 1/4 lengths	2:04 2/5
5/15/1988	Belmont Park	1 1/16 Miles	Shuvee Handicap	I	1	1 3/4 lengths	1:41 3/5
6/11/1988	Belmont Park	1 1/8 Miles	Hempstead Handicap	I	1	7 lengths	1:47 3/5
7/4/1988	Monmouth Park	1 1/16 Miles	Molly Pitcher Stakes	II	1	8 lengths	1:41 4/5
8/6/1988	Saratoga Race Course	1 1/8 Miles	Whitney Handicap	I	1	1 1/2 lengths	1:47 4/5
9/10/1988	Belmont Park	1 Mile	Maskette Stakes	I	1	3/4 length	1:34 1/5
10/16/1988	Belmont Park	1 1/4 Miles	Beldame Stakes	I	1	5 1/2 lengths	2:01 1/5
11/5/1988	Churchill Downs	1 1/8 Miles	Breeders' Cup Distaff	I	1	nose	1:52

Source: Lifetime Past Performances

== Record as a broodmare ==
Personal Ensign became one of the most important broodmares of the late 20th century. She produced ten named foals, most of which were either successful on the track or at stud. Her most notable descendants include:

- Miner's Mark, her first foal, won the G1 Jockey Club Gold Cup.
- Our Emblem, her second foal, was a G1-placed runner who went on to sire notable runners including Kentucky Derby winner War Emblem.
- Traditionally was also a G1 winner and sire.
- My Flag, who was sired by Hall of Fame champion Easy Goer, won four G1 races, including the 1995 Breeders' Cup Juvenile Fillies in a race very similar to Personal Ensign's 1988 Distaff win. Her career earnings totaled over $1,500,000, just $100,000 less than Personal Ensign had earned. Like Personal Ensign, My Flag achieved great success as a broodmare, producing the 2002 Breeders' Cup Juvenile Fillies winner and that year's Eclipse Award-Winning Champion 2-Year Old Filly, Storm Flag Flying. This three-generation success in the Breeders' Cup has not been duplicated by any other mare, and only by one group of stallions.
- Salute, a daughter by Unbridled, was G2-placed, and was also the dam of G1 winner Mr. Speaker.
- Title Seeker, a daughter by Monarchos, was unraced but produced G3 winner Seeking the Title, who in turn produced G1 winner Seeking the Soul.

Personal Ensign was named 1996 Kentucky Broodmare of the Year. She was an alpha mare in the Phipps broodmare band, known for her strong protective instinct towards her foals. At one point, she developed a potentially lethal case of peritonitis, but was able to fight off the infection.

In September 2006, at the age of 22, Personal Ensign (after coming up barren from a mating with Forest Wildcat) was pensioned to the Hancock family's Claiborne Farm. Claiborne breeding shed manager Charles Koch said, "She's still in good shape, looks good, and gets around fine. She's just a little arthritic. She'll be spending time out in the field with other mares Korveya, Arabian Dancer, and Narrate."

Foals by Personal Ensign
Name	Sire	Year	Record	Earnings
Miners Mark	Mr. Prospector	1990	18-6-4-2	$967,170
Our Emblem	Mr. Prospector	1991	27-5-5-5	$366,013
Pennant Champion	Mr. Prospector	1992	7-2-1-2	$48,070
My Flag	Easy Goer	1993	20-6-3-4	$1,557,057
Proud and True	Mr. Prospector	1994	9-3-0-2	$96,170
Traditionally	Mr. Prospector	1997	20-5-1-2	$495,660
Possibility	A.P. Indy	2000	7-1-0-2	$43,278
Salute	Unbridled	2002	10-1-3-2	$103,838
Title Seeker	Monarchos	2003	unraced	unraced
Baronial	Kingmambo	2005	19-1-2-0	$57,365

== Death and legacy ==
The pensioned Personal Ensign died on April 8, 2010, in her pasture at Claiborne Farm in Paris, Kentucky, of natural causes.

Personal Ensign was inducted into the National Museum of Racing and Hall of Fame in 1993, her first year of eligibility.

"Personal Ensign" by Bill Heller

In the Blood-Horse magazine List of the Top 100 Racehorses of the 20th Century, Personal Ensign was ranked No. 48. Her win in the Breeders' Cup Distaff was ranked No. 42 in Horse Racing's Top 100 Moments, compiled by the Blood-Horse.

In 1997, the Personal Ensign Stakes at Saratoga Springs was named in her honor.

== Pedigree ==
Pedigree of Personal Ensign (USA), bay mare, 1984
Sire Private Account (USA) 1976	Damascus (USA); 1964	Sword Dancer	Sunglow
Sire Private Account (USA) 1976	Damascus (USA); 1964	Sword Dancer	Highland Fling
Sire Private Account (USA) 1976	Damascus (USA); 1964	Kerala	My Babu
Sire Private Account (USA) 1976	Damascus (USA); 1964	Kerala	Blade Of Time
Sire Private Account (USA) 1976	Numbered Account (USA); 1969	Buckpasser	Tom Fool
Sire Private Account (USA) 1976	Numbered Account (USA); 1969	Buckpasser	Busanda
Sire Private Account (USA) 1976	Numbered Account (USA); 1969	Intriguing	Swaps
Sire Private Account (USA) 1976	Numbered Account (USA); 1969	Intriguing	Glamour
Dam Grecian Banner (USA) 1974	Hoist The Flag (USA); 1968	Tom Rolfe	Ribot
Dam Grecian Banner (USA) 1974	Hoist The Flag (USA); 1968	Tom Rolfe	Pocahontas
Dam Grecian Banner (USA) 1974	Hoist The Flag (USA); 1968	Wavy Navy	War Admiral
Dam Grecian Banner (USA) 1974	Hoist The Flag (USA); 1968	Wavy Navy	Triomphe
Dam Grecian Banner (USA) 1974	Dorine (ARG); 1958	Aristophanes	Hyperion
Dam Grecian Banner (USA) 1974	Dorine (ARG); 1958	Aristophanes	Commotion
Dam Grecian Banner (USA) 1974	Dorine (ARG); 1958	Doria	Advocate
Dam Grecian Banner (USA) 1974	Dorine (ARG); 1958	Doria	Donatila (family 6-a)

Personal Ensign is inbred 5x4 to War Admiral, meaning this sire appears once in the fifth generation of her pedigree, as the sire of Busanda, and once in the fourth generation.

== See also ==
- List of Undefeated horses
