= Smuggler (horse) =

American-bred Thoroughbred racehorse

- Smuggler's grave at Claiborne Farm
- Sire: Unbridled
- Grandsire: Fappiano
- Dam: Inside Information
- Damsire: Private Account
- Sex: Filly
- Foaled: 2002
- Died: 2015
- Country: United States
- Colour: Bay
- Breeder: Ogden Mills Phipps
- Owner: Ogden Mills Phipps
- Trainer: Claude R. McGaughey III
- Record: 9: 5-2-1
- Earnings: US$654,352

Major wins
- Mother Goose Stakes (2005); Coaching Club American Oaks (2005)

Awards
- American Champion Three-Year-Old Filly (2005)

Smuggler (May 20, 2002 in Kentucky – April 16, 2015) was an American Champion Thoroughbred racing mare. She was a homebred owned by Ogden Mills Phipps and trained by U.S. Racing Hall of Fame trainer Claude "Shug" McGaughey. Smuggler had a short career on the race track but was a Champion. She had a record of 5 wins in 9 lifetime starts. Her biggest victories included wins in the (Grade 1) Mother Goose Stakes and (Grade 1) Coaching Club American Oaks, both at Belmont Park.

Smuggler's mother is the Hall of Fame Champion Thoroughbred Inside Information, and her sire was Champion Kentucky Derby winner Unbridled.

In 2005, Smuggler was awarded the Eclipse Award as Champion Three Year Old Filly. She was retired from racing in September 2006. She died on April 16, 2015, due to complications from foaling.
