= Personal Flag =

American-bred Thoroughbred racehorse

- Sire: Private Account
- Grandsire: Damascus
- Dam: Grecian Banner
- Damsire: Hoist The Flag
- Sex: Stallion
- Foaled: 1983
- Country: United States
- Colour: Dark Bay
- Breeder: Ogden Phipps
- Owner: Ogden Phipps
- Trainer: Claude R. McGaughey III
- Record: 24: 8-4-4
- Earnings: US$1,258,924

Major wins
- Queens County Handicap (1987); Widener Handicap (1987); Suburban Handicap (1988); Nassau County Handicap (1988)

Personal Flag (1983–2005) was an American Thoroughbred racehorse. Bred and raced by Ogden Phipps, he was sired by Private Account and out of the mare Grecian Banner, a daughter of Hoist The Flag He was a full brother to Personal Ensign.

Trained by Shug McGaughey, among his notable race wins, Personal Flag won the Grade 1 Widener Handicap in 1987 and the then Grade 1 Suburban Handicap in 1988.

Personal Flag was euthanized in 2005 due to the infirmities of old age.
