= Strawberry Road =

Australian-bred Thoroughbred racehorse

- Sire: Whiskey Road
- Grandsire: Nijinsky II
- Dam: Giftisa
- Damsire: Rich Gift
- Sex: Stallion
- Foaled: 28 September 1979
- Country: Australia
- Colour: Bay
- Breeder: J. Pantos & G. Georgopoulos
- Owner: J. Pantos & A. Pantos, G. Georgopoulos, M. Menegazzo, Ray Stehr and John Singleton (Australia); Daniel Wildenstein (France); Allen E. Paulson & Bruce McNall (United States)
- Trainer: Doug Bougoure (Australia); John Nicholls (Australia & Germany); Patrick Biancone (France); Charlie Whittingham (United States)
- Record: 45: 17-7-7
- Earnings: US$1,713,958

Major wins
- Rosehill Guineas (1983); AJC Derby (1983); Queensland Derby (1983); Freeway Stakes (1983); W S Cox Plate (1983); Grosser Preis von Baden (1984); Prix d'Harcourt (1985); Grand Prix de Saint-Cloud (1985); Arcadia Handicap (1986)

Awards
- Australian Champion Racehorse of the Year (1983); German Champion Older Horse (1984); Australian Racing Hall of Fame (2009)

Honours
- Royal Agricultural Society of Queensland: Equine Hall of Fame
- Last updated on 23 October 2009

Strawberry Road (28 September 1979 – 1 June 1995) was a champion Australian Thoroughbred racehorse who went on to race in Germany, France, the United States, and Japan. Bred in New South Wales, he was by the 'superbly-bred' Whiskey Road (Nijinsky-Bowl of Flowers) out of Giftisa (by Rich Gift - a grandson of Nasrullah and Abernant).

== Racing career ==
=== In Australia ===
Trained by Doug Bougoure, Strawberry Road had two starts late in his two-year-old season before making a winning start to the new season on 11 August 1982, in the Queensland Maiden Handicap at Eagle Farm. Following a spell, he progressed from an Improvers to a Graduation with four wins in a row. Taken to Sydney, and stepped up to stakes company, he finished second to Marscay (the previous year's Golden Slipper winner) in the Hobartville Stakes, and, after two further lead-up runs, recorded his first Group One wins in the Rosehill Guineas and the AJC Derby. Back in Queensland, following a brief let-up, Strawberry Road won three of his four starts, including the Queensland Derby. After recording 10 wins for the season, including three in Group One races, Strawberry Road was named Australia's champion racehorse for the 1982–1983 season.

In the spring, Strawberry Road campaigned in Melbourne, and, interspersed with defeats at Caulfield, won the Freeway Stakes, the Centennial Stakes, and the Cox Plate. In the autumn, Strawberry Road failed to find his best form, and, after 26 starts in Australia, which produced 13 wins, three seconds, and three-thirds, a controlling interest was sold to Ray Stehr and John Singleton, who exported him to France.

=== International Campaigns ===
Trained by John Nicholls, Strawberry Road won the Grosser Preis von Baden in Germany in 1984. He then finished fifth in the Prix de l'Arc de Triomphe in France, third and fourth, respectively, in the Washington, D.C. International Stakes and the Breeders' Cup Turf in the United States, and closed the year with a seventh in the Japan Cup, ridden by the great English jockey Lester Piggott.

Strawberry Road returned to France in 1985, and, under new trainer Patrick Biancone, won the Prix d'Harcourt. He was then sold to prominent French horseman Daniel Wildenstein, for whom he won the Grand Prix de Saint-Cloud. Wildenstein then sent Strawberry Road to the United States, where he ran second to the champion Pebbles, by a neck, in the Breeders' Cup Turf. Sold to Allen Paulson and Bruce McNall, Strawberry Road remained in the United States, and was trained by Hall of Fame trainer Charlie Whittingham.

Now seven, Strawberry Road recorded the last feature win of his career in the Arcadia Handicap at California's Santa Anita Park in 1986.

== At Stud ==
Retired to stud by Paulson (now his sole owner), at his Brookside Farm in Versailles, Kentucky, Strawberry Road was a highly successful sire. His 368 progeny included 233 winners, and among the most successful were:

- Dinard (b. 1988) - Won 1991 Santa Anita Derby, San Rafael Stakes
- Fraise (b. 1988) - Won the 1992 Breeders' Cup Turf
- Escena (b. 1993) - Won 1998 Breeders' Cup Distaff
- Ajina (b. 1994) - Won 1997 Breeders' Cup Distaff

Strawberry Road is also the damsire of:

- Vindication (b. 2000) - The 2002 American Champion Two-Year-Old Colt and winner of the Breeders' Cup Juvenile
- Affluent (b. 1998) - Winner of four American Grade One races and prize money of more than US$1.4 million

In 1995, Strawberry Road contracted a bacterial infection that led to peritonitis and pneumonia. In a weakened condition, he fell in his stall, fracturing the femur in his right hindleg, and had to be euthanised.

== Pedigree ==
Pedigree of Strawberry Road, bay stallion, foaled 28 September 1979
Sire Whiskey Road b. 1972	Nijinsky II b. 1967	Northern Dancer b. 1961	Nearctic
Sire Whiskey Road b. 1972	Nijinsky II b. 1967	Northern Dancer b. 1961	Natalma
Sire Whiskey Road b. 1972	Nijinsky II b. 1967	Flaming Page b. 1959	Bull Page
Sire Whiskey Road b. 1972	Nijinsky II b. 1967	Flaming Page b. 1959	Flaring Top
Sire Whiskey Road b. 1972	Bowl of Flowers ch. 1958	Sailor II ch. 1952	Eight Thirty
Sire Whiskey Road b. 1972	Bowl of Flowers ch. 1958	Sailor II ch. 1952	Flota
Sire Whiskey Road b. 1972	Bowl of Flowers ch. 1958	Flower Bowl b. 1952	Alibhai
Sire Whiskey Road b. 1972	Bowl of Flowers ch. 1958	Flower Bowl b. 1952	Flower Bed
Dam Giftisa b. 1974	Rich Gift gr. 1959	Princely Gift b. 1951	Nasrullah
Dam Giftisa b. 1974	Rich Gift gr. 1959	Princely Gift b. 1951	Blue Gem
Dam Giftisa b. 1974	Rich Gift gr. 1959	Riccal gr. 1953	Abernant
Dam Giftisa b. 1974	Rich Gift gr. 1959	Riccal gr. 1953	Congo
Dam Giftisa b. 1974	Wahkeena b. 1963	Red Jester br. 1948	Red Mars
Dam Giftisa b. 1974	Wahkeena b. 1963	Red Jester br. 1948	Climax
Dam Giftisa b. 1974	Wahkeena b. 1963	Royal Souci b. 1952	Regal Diamond
Dam Giftisa b. 1974	Wahkeena b. 1963	Royal Souci b. 1952	Carefree (Family 18)
