= Secret Hello =

American Thoroughbred racehorse

Secret Hello (1987-2002) was a stallion by Private Account and the sire of Secret Firm. As a two year old, he won the 1989 Grade 1 Arlington-Washington Futurity at Arlington Park. He died in 2002.
