= Pine Island (horse) =

American thoroughbred racehorse

- Sire: Arch
- Grandsire: Kris S.
- Dam: Matlacha Pass
- Damsire: Seeking The Gold
- Sex: Filly
- Foaled: 2003
- Country: United States
- Colour: Dark Bay
- Breeder: Ogden Phipps
- Owner: Phipps Stable
- Trainer: Claude R. "Shug" McGaughey III
- Record: 7: 4-2-0
- Earnings: $666,800

Major wins
- Alabama Stakes (2006); Gazelle Stakes (2006)

Pine Island (April 19, 2003 – November 4, 2006), was an American thoroughbred racehorse whose career and life were cut short by an injury suffered during the running of the 2006 Breeders' Cup Distaff.

== Racing career ==
Pine Island, unraced as a two-year-old quickly displayed her promise by winning her first career start, a maiden special weight race on the turf at Gulfstream Park in Hallandale, Florida, in February 2006. Rested for almost three months after her triumphant debut, Pine Island returned to the racetrack in May, this time winning an allowance race on the main track at Belmont Park in Elmont, New York. After two strong second-place finishes in the Grade 1 Mother Goose Stakes and Coaching Club American Oaks, both at Belmont, Pine Island notched her first major score in August by winning the Grade 1 Alabama Stakes at Saratoga Race Course in Saratoga Springs, New York. She followed up this success with a win in the Grade 1 Gazelle Stakes at Belmont in September.

== Death ==
Pine Island's promising career and ultimately her life came to an end on November 4, 2006, when she broke down on the backstretch during the running of the Breeders' Cup Distaff which was held at Churchill Downs in Louisville, Kentucky, that year. It was discovered that she had dislocated her left front ankle so severely that there would be virtually no chance of her survival. Dr. Wayne McIlwraith, a track veterinarian at Churchill Downs who examined her said that there were likely multiple fractures and soft tissue injuries as well. Due to the decreased blood supply and the risk of contamination from the open wound caused by the injury, she was humanely euthanized after being vanned off the racetrack.

== Legacy ==
Pine Island was buried on November 13 in a private ceremony at Claiborne Farm's Marchmont Cemetery. Claude R. "Shug" McGaughey III, who trained Pine Island for the Phipps Stable, was quoted as saying: "She was a pleasure to be around because she liked doing it, and she made very few mistakes around the barn." Gus Koch, the Farm Manager of Claiborne, said: "It was a sad, sad day. It was sad for the Phippses and all of us at Claiborne. We foaled her and weaned her and raised her as a yearling. She was a lovely individual to be around and very nice to get along with. It's just a tragic loss." Pine Island's grave is located right next to 1998 American Champion Three-Year-Old Filly, Banshee Breeze. Others who share the same cemetery space as her include the Phipps's racing superstar Easy Goer.
