= Escena =

American-bred Thoroughbred racehorse

- Sire: Strawberry Road
- Grandsire: Whiskey Road
- Dam: Claxton's Slew
- Damsire: Seattle Slew
- Sex: Filly
- Foaled: May 12, 1993; Kentucky
- Died: June 3, 2015; Versailles, KY
- Country: United States
- Colour: Bay
- Breeder: Allen E. Paulson
- Owner: Guy and Diane Snowden
- Trainer: William I. Mott
- Record: 29: 11-9-3
- Earnings: US$2,962,639

Major wins
- Fantasy Stakes (1996); Ramona Handicap (1997); Apple Blossom Handicap (1998); Vanity Invitational Handicap (1998); Louisville Breeders' Cup Handicap (1998); Fleur de Lis Handicap (1998); Breeders' Cup wins: Breeders' Cup Distaff (1998)

Awards
- American Champion Older Female Horse (1998)

Escena (May 12, 1993 – June 3, 2015) was an American Thoroughbred racemare. She won multiple stakes races from 1996 to 1998 and notably finished runner-up in the 1996 Kentucky Oaks.

Her 5-year old season saw most of her success which concluded with a victory in the Breeders' Cup Distaff. Also in 1998, she was voted American Champion Older Female Horse at the Eclipse Awards.

== Background ==
Escena was bred and raced by Allen Paulson, and trained by U.S. Racing Hall of Fame inductee William I. Mott. She was foaled out of Claxton's Slew, a daughter of 1977 U.S. Triple Crown champion Seattle Slew, and was sired by Strawberry Road. Strawberry Road also sired Allen Paulson's Champion filly and 1997 Breeders' Cup Distaff winner Ajina.

== Career ==
=== 1995 ===
She won two of her three starts in her debut season at age two.

=== 1996 ===
At age three, Escena earned her first Graded stakes race at Oaklawn Park in Hot Springs, Arkansas, in the 1996 Fantasy Stakes.

=== 1997 ===
After finishing second in three Grade I races in 1996, the following year she got her first Grade I win in the Ramona Handicap at Del Mar Racetrack in Del Mar, California. She went on to finish third in the 1997 Breeders' Cup Distaff behind winner and stablemate Ajina.

=== 1998 ===
At age five, Escena blossomed into a racing star under jockey Jerry Bailey. She won the Grades 1 Vanity Invitational and Apple Blossom Handicaps plus at Churchill Downs, and the Grades II Louisville Breeders' Cup and Fleur de Lis Handicaps. She capped off her 1998 campaign with a win in the Breeders' Cup Distaff and was voted American Champion Older Female Horse honors.

=== Record ===
Date	Track	Race	Finish
2 year old
10/1/1995	Belmont Park	Maiden Special Weight	1st
10/26/1995	Belmont Park	Allowance	1st
11/25/1995	Aqueduct	Demoiselle Stakes	3rd
3 year old
2/24/1996	Gulfstream Park	Allowance	1st
3/13/1996	Gulfstream Park	Bonnie Miss Stakes	2nd
4/5/1996	Oaklawn Park	Fantasy Stakes	1st
5/3/1996	Churchill Downs	Kentucky Oaks	2nd
6/22/1996	Belmont Park	Mother Goose Stakes	2nd
7/27/1996	Saratoga	Test Stakes	5th
8/17/1996	Saratoga	Alabama Stakes	2nd
9/8/1996	Belmont Park	Gazelle Handicap	2nd
4 year old
3/12/1997	Gulfstream Park	Allowance	1st
4/11/1997	Oaklawn Park	Apple Blossom Handicap	4th
5/2/1997	Churchill Downs	Louisville Breeders' Cup Handicap	2nd
5/24/1997	Belmont Park	Shuvee Handicap	3rd
6/28/1997	Belmont Park	Hempstead Handicap	5th
8/2/1997	Del Mar	Ramona Handicap	1st
8/24/1997	Arlington	Beverly D. Stakes	6th
10/13/1997	Belmont Park	Athenia Handicap	4th
11/8/1997	Hollywood Park	Breeders' Cup Distaff	3rd
5 year old
2/1/1998	Gulfstream Park	Sabin Handicap	2nd
3/1/1998	Gulfstream Park	Rampart Handicap	2nd
4/10/1998	Oaklawn Park	Apple Blossom Handicap	1st
5/1/1998	Churchill Downs	Louisville Breeders' Cup Handicap	1st
6/6/1998	Churchill Downs	Fleur de Lis Handicap	1st
6/27/1998	Hollywood Park	Vanity Invitational Handicap	1st
8/2/1998	Saratoga	Go for Wand Handicap	2nd
8/28/1998	Saratoga	Personal Ensign Handicap	6th
11/7/1998	Churchill Downs	Breeders' Cup Distaff	1st

== Retirement ==
Escena was retired at the end of her 1998 racing campaign and sold to Guy Snowden for $3.25 million at the January 1999 Horses of All Ages Sale at Keeneland. It was the highest price ever paid for a broodmare or broodmare prospect in Keeneland's history. She remained in service at Allen Paulson's Brookside Farm (now Diamond A Farm) near Versailles, Kentucky.

=== Stud Career ===
Foaled	Name	Sire	Sex
2000	Virtuosa	Seeking The Gold	Mare
2004	Queenofalldiamonds	Kingmambo	Mare
2006	Eye On Jacob	A.P. Indy	Colt
2007	Indy Scent	A.P. Indy	Gelding
2009	Scarlett Madeleine	Smart Strike	Mare
2010	Python	Empire Maker	Colt
2013	Herkimer Diamond	Rock Hard Ten	Mare
2014	Clemency	Shackleford	Mare

== Death ==
On June 3, 2015, Escena died of old age.
