= Randy Romero =

American jockey (1957–2019)

Personal information
- Born: December 22, 1957 Erath, Louisiana, United States
- Died: August 29, 2019 (aged 61) Lafayette, Louisiana, United States
- Occupation: Jockey

Horse racing career
- Sport: Horse racing
- Career wins: 4,285

Major racing wins
- Haskell Invitational Stakes (1982); Clark Handicap (1982); Essex Handicap (1982); Isaac Murphy Handicap (1982); Jefferson Cup Stakes (1982); Ladies Handicap (1984, 1986); Arlington Classic (1986); Champagne Stakes (1986); Coaching Club American Oaks (1986); Cowdin Stakes (1986); Frizette Stakes (1986); Hawthorne Gold Cup Handicap (1986); Jockey Club Gold Cup (1986); Carter Handicap (1987); Garden City Handicap (1987); Hopeful Stakes (1987); Jamaica Handicap (1987); Queens County Handicap (1987); Spinster Stakes (1987); Woodward Stakes (1987); Astoria Stakes (1988); Beldame Stakes (1988, 1990); Bernard Baruch Handicap (1988); Fall Highweight Handicap (1988, 1989); Florida Derby (1988); Gazelle Handicap (1988); Hudson Stakes (NYB) (1988); Queen Elizabeth II Challenge Cup Stakes (1988); Violet Handicap (1988); Vosburgh Stakes (1988, 1989); Whitney Handicap (1988); Blue Grass Stakes (1989 & 1995); Commonwealth Stakes (1989); Alabama Stakes (1990); Arlington Oaks (1990); Mother Goose Stakes (1990); Secretariat Stakes (1990); Test Stakes (1990); Brooklyn Handicap (1992); Adirondack Stakes (1993); Arlington Handicap (1995); Arlington-Washington Lassie Stakes (1996) Breeders' Cup wins: Breeders' Cup Distaff (1987, 1988); Breeders' Cup Juvenile Fillies (1989)

Honors
- Fair Grounds Racing Hall of Fame (1992); Louisiana Sports Hall of Fame (2005); National Museum of Racing and Hall of Fame (2010)

Significant horses
- Go For Wand, Polish Navy, Personal Ensign; Sacahuista, Yankee Affair, Wavering Monarch
- Updated on May 29, 2010

Randy Paul Romero (December 22, 1957 – August 29, 2019) was an American jockey in the sport of Thoroughbred horse racing.

Born into a family involved with horses, his father Lloyd J. Romero was a Louisiana state trooper who trained American Quarter Horses and later, after a drunk driver crashed into his police car and permanently disabled him, he began training Thoroughbreds for flat racing. The 1978 movie Casey's Shadow is based on Lloyd Romero and his family. He was elected into the Thoroughbred Racing Hall of Fame May 27, 2010.

== Career ==
In 1975, Romero began his professional riding career at Evangeline Downs in Lafayette, Louisiana.

Nicknamed the "Ragin' Cajun", in 1983 at Oaklawn Park racetrack in Arkansas Romero suffered a near career-ending injury when he received major burns to two-thirds of his body from a freak fire that erupted while taking a sauna. He had rubbed himself down with alcohol and moved into the sauna in the jockey's room. As he did he accidentally broke a live light bulb that immediately ignited his entire body. After seven months of rehabilitation, he returned to compete at the Fair Grounds Race Course in New Orleans, where he won his third of four riding titles and set a track record with 181 wins.

Romero's success led to owner Ogden Phipps and trainer Shug McGaughey choosing him to be the regular rider for Personal Ensign. Romero rode the future Hall of Fame filly to an undefeated career, capped off with a victory in the 1988 Breeders' Cup Distaff, an event he had won the previous year aboard Sacahuista for trainer D. Wayne Lukas. The following year he won his third straight Breeders' Cup race, taking the Juvenile Fillies event with Go for Wand. He was aboard Go for Wand and in the lead in the 1990 Breeders' Cup Distaff race when she fell to the track after suffering an open fracture to her right cannon bone. Romero broke his pelvis and several ribs, and the filly had to be immediately euthanized.

While Romero met with great success as a jockey, the downside of his career was a number of racing-related injuries requiring more than twenty surgeries. He retired in July 1999 having ridden 4,285 winners, notably winning a number of important Grade I events.

== Health problems ==
In 2002, Romero's health problems were added to when he learned that the disordered eating required to maintain riding weight during his years as a jockey had severely damaged his kidneys. He said he began vomiting his food at an early age in the practice known as "flipping" in the world of jockeys.

In addition, his liver was damaged by a tainted blood transfusion received during one of his many operations. Along with fellow jockey Shane Sellers, he was featured in the 2004 HBO documentary film titled Jockey. Directed by Kate Davis, the films tells the story of their health problems resulting from racing injuries and the long-term effects of bulimia to maintain racing weight.

For a number of years, Romero suffered from hepatitis C; on February 18, 2008, he had a kidney removed at a Louisville, Kentucky hospital. His remaining kidney did not work very well and he had to receive dialysis treatments several times each week.

On June 19, 2019, Romero entered hospice care in Lafayette due to his cancer which was detected in 2015.

Romero died on August 29, 2019, due to stomach cancer.

== Legacy ==
Romero was voted into the National Museum of Racing and Hall of Fame in 2010.
