= William I. Mott =

American horse trainer

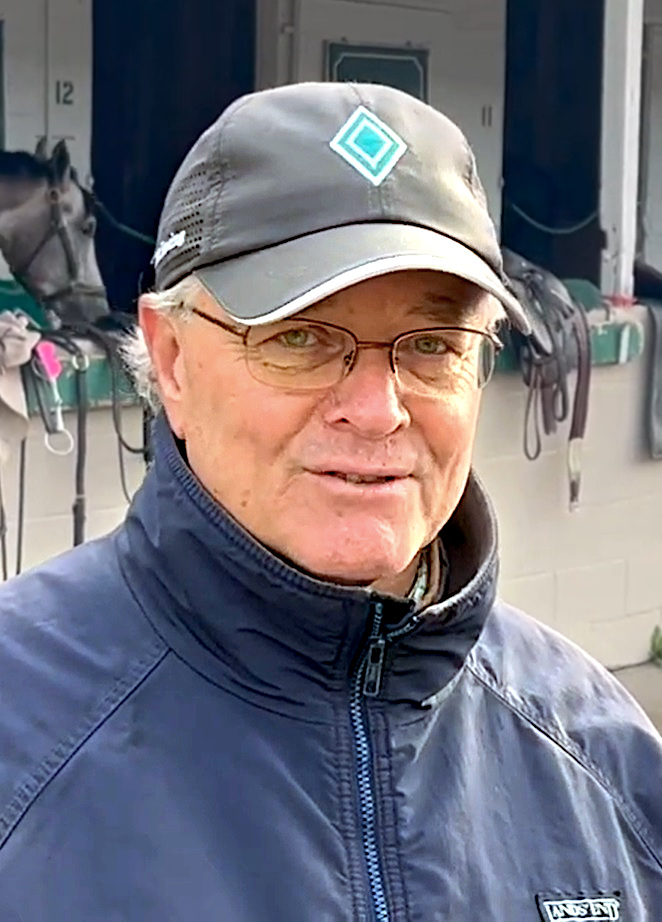
- Mott in 2023

Personal information
- Born: July 29, 1953 (age 73) Mobridge, South Dakota
- Occupation: Trainer

Horse racing career
- Sport: Horse racing
- Career wins: 5,656+ (ongoing)

Major racing wins
- Black Gold Stakes (1984); Blue Grass Stakes (1984); Edgewood Stakes (1984, 1998, 1999, 2001, 2002, 2008, 2010); Appalachian Stakes (1995, 2002); Beldame Stakes(2020); Carter Handicap (2022); Apple Blossom Handicap (1984, 1985, 1998); Joe Hirsch Turf Classic Inv. Handicap (1987, 2005); Man o' War Stakes (1987); Cornhusker Handicap (1988); Churchill Downs Stakes (2023); Jim Dandy Stakes (1990, 1995, 1998); Brooklyn Handicap (1992, 1996); Hollywood Derby (1992, 2008); Hollywood Turf Cup Stakes (1993); Jersey Derby (1993, 2000); Alfred G. Vanderbilt Handicap (2023); Lamplighter Handicap (1993, 1995, 2000, 2003); Lexington Stakes (1993, 1995, 2000, 2006); Test Stakes (1993, 2000); Just A Game Stakes (1994, 2005, 2007, 2010, 2016); Arlington Million (1994); Jenny Wiley Stakes (1994, 1996, 2006, 2007); Turf Classic Stakes (1994, 2004, 2018); Washington, D.C. International Stakes (1994); Canadian International Stakes (1995); Donn Handicap (1995, 1996); Hollywood Gold Cup (1995); Jockey Club Gold Cup (1995, 2012, 2013, 2022); Pimlico Special (1995); Oaklawn Handicap (1995, 1996); Woodward Stakes (1995, 1996, 2018); Suburban Handicap (1996); Mother Goose Stakes (1997); Black Helen Handicap (1998, 2000); Shadwell Turf Mile Stakes (1998, 2001); Royal Palm Handicap (2001); Virginia Derby (2002, 2003); Diana Handicap (2005, 2006, 2007); Hopeful Stakes (2007); Alabama Stakes (2005, 2011); Pacific Classic Stakes (2008, 2026); Pegasus World Cup Invitational Stakes (2023); Metropolitan Handicap (2023); Travers Stakes (2025); Whitney Stakes (2024, 2026) American Classics wins: Belmont Stakes (2010, 2025); Kentucky Derby (2019, 2025) Breeders' Cup wins: Breeders' Cup Turf (1987, 1992); Breeders' Cup Classic (1995, 2011, 2026); Breeders' Cup Distaff (1997, 1998, 2010, 2011, 2012); Breeders' Cup Mile (2016) International race wins: Dubai World Cup (1996)

Racing awards
- Eclipse Award for Outstanding Trainer (1995, 1996, 2011, 2023, 2025); Big Sport of Turfdom Award (1996)

Honors
- Fair Grounds Racing Hall of Fame (1997); National Museum of Racing and Hall of Fame (1998)

Significant horses
- Ajina, Art Collector (horse), Cigar, Cody's Wish, Drosselmeyer, Elite Power, Escena, Favorite Trick, Fraise, My Typhoon, Olympiad, Paradise Creek, Royal Anthem, Royal Delta, Theatrical, Tourist, Country House, Sovereignty

William I. "Bill" Mott (born July 29, 1953, in Mobridge, South Dakota) is an American horse trainer, most notable for his work with Cigar. Mott earned the Eclipse Award for Outstanding Trainer in 1995, 1996, 2011, 2023. He was inducted into the National Museum of Racing and Hall of Fame in 1998 at the age of 45, becoming the youngest thoroughbred trainer ever inducted. He was the winning trainer of the Kentucky Derby for a second time in 2025 with Sovereignty.

== Life and career ==
Mott was born on July 29, 1953, Mobridge, South Dakota. He started training thoroughbreds at age 15 with his family, and won the South Dakota Futurity at Park Jefferson with Kosmic Tour, before he was out of high school. He worked his way up the ranks by becoming first an exercise rider, then an assistant trainer for Hall of Fame Trainer Jack Van Berg.

In 1976, Mott, trainer Frank Brothers (who was also Van Berg's assistant trainer), and a stable crew guided Van Berg's horses through the wins at Sportsman's, Hawthorne and Arlington Park race tracks in Chicago. They were so successful that Van Berg was named leading trainer at Arlington Park and leading trainer in the Nation with 496 wins in 1976, a record that stood until Steve Asmussen broke it in 2003 with 555 wins. Mott worked as an assistant trainer for Van Berg for three years before striking out on his own in 1978.

On the July 28, 2007, ABC Sports broadcast of the Diana Handicap, Hall of Fame jockey and race commentator Jerry Bailey said Mott is generally regarded as the best trainer for racing on turf in the United States.

== Training Titles ==
From 1992 through 2007, Mott won 9 training titles at Saratoga Race Course. He won the 2007 Saratoga Trainer's Title with 27 wins, marking his first return to that title at the "Spa" since 2001. He's also won 10 titles at Belmont Park and 9 at Gulfstream Park. Mott held the record of 31 titles at Churchill Downs until 2017 when that record was passed by trainer Dale Romans.

Mott set the record for number of victories at a single Churchill Downs meeting with 54 during the 1984 spring meet.

Mott ranks fourth in Breeders' Cup money earned behind D. Wayne Lukas, Robert Frankel and Shug McGaughey.

Mott recorded his 5000th career win on June 20, 2020, when Moon Over Miami won the 3rd race at Churchill Downs.

In 2025, he was the winning trainer of the Kentucky Derby for a second time with Sovereignty, ridden by jockey Junior Alvarado.

== Cigar ==
Cigar was owned by Allen E. Paulson and did not race as a two-year-old. Under trainer Alex Hassinger, he made an unsuccessful debut in early 1993 in a six-furlong (1,207 m) race on a dirt track in California. After he broke his maiden a few months later, his trainer switched him to racing on grass, but the horse proved mediocre at best. The following year, his owner shipped Cigar to East Coast trainer Bill Mott, who gave him the first half of the year off, bringing him back to racing in July. After more disappointing results on turf, it was decided to give Cigar one more try racing on dirt. In his first attempt, at Aqueduct Racetrack, he won easily.

For the following year's racing season, Cigar proved to be the best horse in North America, winning all ten major races he entered under jockey Jerry Bailey, including the Pimlico Special. Cigar capped off the year with an October victory in the $3 million U.S. Breeders' Cup Classic while setting a stakes record of 1:59.58 for the 1 1/4 miles (2,000 m) distance. That year, Cigar was voted 1995 Champion Older Male and received the Eclipse Award for Horse of the Year.

In 1996, the team of Cigar, Paulson, Mott, and Bailey won the Big Sport of Turfdom Award.

Cigar continued his winning ways that year, including traveling more than 6,000 miles (9,700 km) to earn a victory in the inaugural Dubai World Cup in Dubai, United Arab Emirates with a purse of $5 million. During the season, Cigar matched the decades-old accomplishment of Triple Crown champion Citation by winning his 16th race in a row in the Arlington Citation Challenge. Cigar failed in his bid to break the record when he lost to Dare and Go in the Pacific Classic Stakes at Del Mar Racetrack.

The 1996 Woodward Stakes at Belmont Park was Cigar's last victory.
