= Ashado =

American Thoroughbred racehorse

- Sire: Saint Ballado
- Grandsire: Halo
- Dam: Goulash
- Damsire: Mari's Book
- Sex: Filly
- Foaled: 2001
- Country: United States
- Color: Dark bay
- Breeder: Aaron & Marie Jones
- Owner: Starlight Racing
- Trainer: Todd Pletcher
- Record: 21: 12-4-3
- Earnings: $3,931,440

Major wins
- Schuylerville Stakes (2003); Spinaway Stakes (2003); Demoiselle Stakes (2003); Cotillion Handicap (2004); Fair Grounds Oaks (2004); Kentucky Oaks (2004); Coaching Club American Oaks (2004); Ogden Phipps Handicap (2005); Go For Wand Handicap (2005); Beldame Stakes (2005) Breeders' Cup wins: Breeders' Cup Distaff (2004)

Awards
- U.S. Champion 3-Yr-Old filly (2004); U.S. Champion Older Female Horse (2005)

Honours
- United States Racing Hall of Fame (2014)
- Last updated on May 3, 2014

Ashado (foaled February 4, 2001 in Kentucky) is an American Thoroughbred racemare whose seven Grade I wins included the 2004 Breeders' Cup Distaff. She won Eclipse Awards as the Champion Three-Year-Old Filly of 2004 and Champion Older Female of 2005, and was inducted into the National Museum of Racing and Hall of Fame in 2014. At the end of the 2005 racing season, her owners sold her at the Keeneland Sales November auction for $9 million, a world-record price for a broodmare/broodmare prospect.

== Background ==
Ashado was bred by Aaron & Marie Jones in Kentucky. She was by Saint Ballado and out of Goulash, by Mari's Book. Goulash was a stakes winning Florida-bred mare who later produced two stakes-winning full brothers to Ashado, Sun River and Saint Stephen. Saint Ballado was a full brother to champion two-year-old colt Devil's Bag. Though less successful than his brother on the racetrack, Saint Ballado proved the superior sire. His other leading offspring included Saint Liam, the 2005 Horse of the Year.

Ashado was sold at the September 2002 Keeneland yearling sale to a partnership that included Jack and Laurie Wolf's Starlight Racing, Johns Martin and Paul Saylor. She was trained by Todd Pletcher.

== Racing career ==
=== 2003: Two-year-old season ===
Ashado won in her first start on June 18, 2003, at Belmont Park by seven lengths over a sloppy track. For her next start, she was entered in the Schuylerville Stakes on July 23 at Saratoga and won by three lengths. On August 29, she stepped up in class to the Grade I Spinaway Stakes at Saratoga, where she was the third betting choice in a field of six. She raced off the pace for the first part of the race, then pulled away in the stretch to win by 1 1/2 lengths. "My biggest concern was that this filly is so lazy in the mornings that I didn't do enough with her", said Pletcher. "She had three works and they were all slow since the Schuylerville. Fortunately, she is one of those horses that know the difference between the morning and the afternoon."

Ashado next entered the Frizette Stakes at Belmont Park as the favorite but finished third behind Society Selection. She then finished second in the Breeders' Cup Juvenile Fillies, held that year at Santa Anita Park. "We were right behind Halfbridled and around the quarter-pole I came up along side her and I thought I had a chance", said jockey John Velazquez. "But that filly, she just had a bit more today. My filly has a future."

Ashado finished the season with a win in the Demoiselle Stakes at Aqueduct on November 29. After racing off the pace early, she hit the lead in mid-stretch but slowed down and was nearly beaten by late closing La Reina. Pletcher again noted her laziness during morning workouts and said, "She gets a little idle when she makes the lead." The victory brought her record for 2003 to four wins from six starts, including three Grade I races in which she had a first, a second and a third-place finish (in the Spinaway, Juvenile Filles and Frizette respectively).

=== 2004: Three-year-old season ===
Ashado started her three-year-old campaign in March with a win in the Fair Grounds Oaks, then finished second in the Ashland Stakes at Keeneland in April to Madcap Escapade. For the Kentucky Oaks at Churchill Downs on April 30, Ashado was the betting favorite in a competitive field of 11. On a muddy track, she raced in second behind Madcap Escapade, who opened up a large lead while setting a "blazing" pace for the first six furlongs. Ashado then started closing ground and finally pulled ahead in the final furlong to win by 1 1/4 lengths.

On June 26, Ashado finished second in the Mother Goose Stakes to Stellar Jayne, then faced her again in the Coaching Club American Oaks on July 24. In the Oaks, Ashado handled a muddy track well and defeated Stellar Jayne by 4 1/4 lengths. "I put her in good position and let her do her own thing", said Velazquez. "She started going to the lead and waiting, so I spanked her a couple of times to keep her mind interested. She did everything pretty easy."

In the Alabama Stakes on August 21, Ashado finished third, beaten by Society Selection, who had beaten her a year earlier in the Frizette, and Stellar Jayne. "We were close to the pace, as we anticipated we would be. They were running along, but it concerned me the way the track was changing throughout the day", said Pletcher. "It was becoming a little bit of a tiring track... She prompted some pretty fast fractions, and she got a little tired." Ashado then won the Cotillion Handicap at Parx Racing as a final prep for the Breeders' Cup Distaff.

The Breeders' Cup was held that year at Lone Star Park in Texas on October 30. In the Distaff, Ashado got a "perfect trip" and won by 1 1/4 lengths over Storm Flag Flying. It was the first Breeders' Cup win for Pletcher, who said, ""Without a doubt, this filly has delivered every start of her life." She was the first filly since the Breeders' Cup was created (in 1984) to win both the Distaff and Kentucky Oaks, making her the consensus choice for American Champion Three-Year-Old Filly.

=== 2005: Four-year-old season ===
Ashado was given a rest then returned to the racetrack in the Grade I Apple Blossom Handicap at Oaklawn Park on April 9, 2005. She raced just off the pace but did not respond when asked in the stretch drive. Instead she finished fifth, her first time out of the money. Pletcher later blamed himself for not having trained her sufficiently for the race. Ashado then finished second in the Pimlico Breeders' Cup Distaff Handicap in May, where she struggled with "the wrong type of track" according to Pletcher.

Ashado returned to form in the Ogden Phipps Handicap at Belmont on June 18, winning by an "authoritative" three lengths. She followed up in the Go For Wand Handicap at Saratoga on August 1 against four other fillies and mares. She hit the lead turning into the stretch then seemed to hesitate. "I said, 'No, Mommy, you're going to have to stay busy; these are the big girls,'" said Velazquez, who then tapped Ashado with the whip three times. Ashado responded by pulling away for an "effortless" victory by 9 1/2 lengths.

Ashado was then upset in the Personal Ensign Stakes at Saratoga in late August, this time by Shadow Cast. "She never seemed to fire", said Pletcher. "She was never dragging Johnny along the way she normally does. She left there flat and ran flat the whole way." She rebounded in the Beldame Stakes at Belmont, moving to the lead turning into the stretch and then holding off a late charge from Happy Ticket to win by half a length.

In the final start of her career, Ashado finished third in the Breeders' Cup Distaff, held that year at Belmont Park on October 29. If she had finished first or second, she would have retired as the all-time female money leader. As it was, Pleasant Home pulled off a 30–1 upset when she won by 9 1/4 lengths, with Society Selection edging Ashado by a neck for second place. "I would have liked to send her out with a win", said Pletcher, "but you could never be disappointed with the career that this filly has had. It's been a tremendous run these last three years."

Despite the loss, Ashado still won three Grade I races at age four (the Ogden Phipps, Go For Wand and Beldame), the same number she had earned at three (the Kentucky Oaks, Coaching Club American Oaks and Distaff). She earned the Eclipse Award for Champion Older Female of 2005 with 203 of 257 first place votes, making her the first filly to earn titles at three and four since Life's Magic in 1984–5.

Ashado was elected to the National Museum of Racing and Hall of Fame in 2014.

== Offspring ==
In November 2005, Ashado was offered as a broodmare prospect at the Keeneland sales. A bidding war began between agent John Ferguson, who represented Sheikh Mohammed of Darley Stud, and Coolmore Stud. Ferguson secured Ashado for Darley with a world-record bid for a racing or broodmare prospect of $9 million.

As of October 2026, Ashado has produced the following named foals:

- 2007: Star Cat, an unraced Bay Stallion by Storm Cat. Star Cat was retired to stud at Breakway Farm in Dillsboro, Indiana in 2010, where he stood for $2000. He was sold to stand in Italy in 2018
- 2009: Steele Road, a gelding by Street Cry. Winless in five starts.
- 2011: Regent's House, a filly by Street Cry. One win from six starts.
- 2012: Ashland Park, a colt by Street Cry. Unraced.
- 2013: Theatric, a filly by Bernardini. two wins from seven starts.
- 2014: Westwood, a gelding by Bernardini. Four wins from nine starts, includingi the 2018 Runhappy Stakes.
- 2015: Alfresco, a filly by Tapit. One win and one second from three starts.
- 2016: Beautify, a filly by Lemon Drop Kid. One win from three starts.
- 2017: Allende, a filly by Candy Ride. One win and one second from three starts.
- 2018: Casual Affair, a gelding by Into Mischief. Winless in three starts.
- 2020: Froshado, a filly by Frosted. One win and one second in four starts.
- 2021: Snowmelt, a filly by Frosted. Unplaced in only start.
- 2022: Bernardo, a gelding by Bernardini. Winless in 15 starts as of October 2026.

== Pedigree ==
Pedigree of Ashado, dark bay or brown mare, February 4, 2001
Sire Saint Ballado 1989	Halo; 1989	Hail to Reason	*Turn-to
Sire Saint Ballado 1989	Halo; 1989	Hail to Reason	Nothirdchance
Sire Saint Ballado 1989	Halo; 1989	Cosmah	Cosmic Bomb
Sire Saint Ballado 1989	Halo; 1989	Cosmah	Almahmoud
Sire Saint Ballado 1989	Ballade; 1972	*Herbager	Vandale (FR)
Sire Saint Ballado 1989	Ballade; 1972	*Herbager	Flagette (FR)
Sire Saint Ballado 1989	Ballade; 1972	Miss Swapsco	Cohoes
Sire Saint Ballado 1989	Ballade; 1972	Miss Swapsco	Soaring
Dam Goulash 1993	Mari's Brook; 1978	Northern Dancer	Nearctic
Dam Goulash 1993	Mari's Brook; 1978	Northern Dancer	Natalma
Dam Goulash 1993	Mari's Brook; 1978	Mari Her	Maribeau
Dam Goulash 1993	Mari's Brook; 1978	Mari Her	Hem and Haw
Dam Goulash 1993	Wise Bride; 1987	Blushing Groom (FR)	Red God
Dam Goulash 1993	Wise Bride; 1987	Blushing Groom (FR)	Runaway Bride (GB)
Dam Goulash 1993	Wise Bride; 1987	Wising Up	Smarten
Dam Goulash 1993	Wise Bride; 1987	Wising Up	Hardly

Ashado is inbred 3S x 5D to Cosmah, meaning Cosmah appears in the 3rd generation of the sire's side of the pedigree and in the 5th generation of the dam's side of the pedigree. Ashado is inbred 4S x 5D x 6D to Almahmoud, who is the dam of both Cosmah (dam of Halo and Maribeau) and Natalma (dam of Northern Dancer).

'*' denotes a horse who was bred in another country and subsequently imported into the United States.
