= Ajina =

American-bred Thoroughbred racehorse

- Sire: Strawberry Road
- Grandsire: Whiskey Road
- Dam: Winglet
- Damsire: Alydar
- Sex: Mare
- Foaled: April 13, 1994; Kentucky
- Died: 2015 (exact date unknown)
- Country: United States
- Colour: Dark Bay
- Breeder: Allen E. Paulson
- Owner: Stonerside Stable
- Trainer: William I. Mott
- Record: 17: 7-3-2
- Earnings: $1,327,915

Major wins
- Tempted Stakes (1996); Demoiselle Stakes (1996); Coaching Club American Oaks (1997); Mother Goose Stakes (1997); Pimlico Breeders' Cup Distaff Handicap (1998); Breeders' Cup wins: Breeders' Cup Distaff (1997)

Awards
- American Champion 3-Year-Old Filly (1997)
- Last updated on August 30, 2007

Ajina (April 13, 1994 – c. 2015) was an American Champion Thoroughbred racemare, who won the 1997 Breeders' Cup Distaff, as well as that year's American Champion 3-year-old Filly award.

== Background ==
Ajina was bred by Allen E. Paulson, and was purchased by Janice and Robert McNair's Stonerside Stable of Paris, Kentucky. She was foaled out of the mare Winglet, a daughter of U.S. Racing Hall of Fame inductee Alydar, and was sired by Strawberry Road, a winner of important Group One races in Australia and the 1983 Australian Champion Racehorse of the Year.

== Racing career ==
=== 1996 ===
Sent to the track at age two by trainer Bill Mott, in her four starts Ajina won a maiden race plus the 1996 Tempted and Demoiselle Stakes. In her only other start, she ran second.

=== 1997 ===
The filly started nine times, finishing third twice and running second in the 1997 Alabama and Beldame Stakes. Ridden by Mike E. Smith, Ajina won the Coaching Club American Oaks and Mother Goose Stakes then scored the most important win of her racing career at Hollywood Park Racetrack by capturing the Breeders' Cup Distaff. Her performances in 1997 earned her that year's American Champion 3-Year-Old Filly honors.

=== 1998 ===
Ajina raced four times at age four, winning the 1998 Pimlico Breeders' Cup Distaff Handicap but finishing off the board in her other three starts.

=== Record ===
Date	Race Type	Track	Finish
2-year old
9/15/1996	Maiden Special Weight	Belmont Park	2nd
10/13/1996	Maiden Special Weight	Belmont Park	1st
11/10/1996	Tempted Stakes	Aqueduct	1st
11/30/1996	Demoiselle Stakes	Aqueduct	1st
3-year old
3/9/1997	Bonnie Miss Stakes	Gulfstream Park	4th
4/6/1997	Fantasy Stakes	Oaklawn Park	3rd
5/1/1997	La Troienne Stakes	Churchill Downs	4th
5/31/1997	Acorn Stakes	Belmont Park	3rd
6/21/1997	Mother Goose Stakes	Belmont Park	1st
7/19/1997	Coaching Club American Oaks	Belmont Park	1st
8/16/1997	Alabama Stakes	Saratoga	2nd
10/19/1997	Beldame Stakes	Belmont Park	2nd
11/8/1997	Breeders' Cup Distaff	Hollywood Park	1st
4-year old
4/11/1998	Bayakoa Stakes	Oaklawn Park	8th
5/16/1998	Pimlico Distaff Handicap	Pimlico	1st
6/20/1998	Hempstead Handicap	Belmont Park	4th
7/26/1998	Delaware Handicap	Delaware Park	6th

== Stud career ==
Ajina was retired to broodmare duty at Stonerside Stable in Paris, Kentucky. Of her foals, Manchurian was the only horse to win a stakes race, being the 2006 Stymie Handicap at Aqueduct.

Foaled	Name	Sire	Sex
2000	Manchurian	Deputy Minister	Colt
2001	El Leopardo	Storm Cat	Colt
2003	Jinni	A.P. Indy	Mare
2006	Ruth E.	A.P. Indy	Mare
2007	Ready For Change	A.P. Indy	Colt
2009	Al Andaleeb	Bernardini	Mare
2011	Updraft	Awesome Again	Gelding
2012	Pisgah	Bernardini	Colt
