= Life's Magic =

American-bred Thoroughbred racehorse

- Sire: Cox's Ridge
- Grandsire: Best Turn
- Dam: Fire Water
- Damsire: Tom Rolfe
- Sex: Filly
- Foaled: 1981
- Country: United States
- Colour: Bay
- Breeder: M/M Douglas Parrish & David Parrish III
- Owner: Mel Hatley & Eugene V. Klein
- Trainer: D. Wayne Lukas
- Record: 32: 8-11-6
- Earnings: US$2,255,218

Major wins
- Oak Leaf Stakes (1983); Beldame Stakes (1984); Mother Goose Stakes (1984); Alabama Stakes (1984); Monmouth Oaks (1984); Shuvee Handicap (1985) Breeders' Cup wins: Breeders' Cup Distaff (1985)

Awards
- American Champion Three-Year-Old Filly (1984); American Champion Older Female Horse (1985)

Life's Magic (1981–2007) was an American Thoroughbred racehorse. In a career that lasted from 1983 to 1985 she won eight races and was a two-time Eclipse Award winner.

== Background ==
Bred in Kentucky, Life's Magic was sired by Cox's Ridge, a Grade I winner and descendant of the great Nearco. She was out of the mare Fire Water, a daughter of 1965 Preakness Stakes winner and American Champion Three-Year-Old Colt Tom Rolfe.

Life's Magic was conditioned for racing by future U.S. Racing Hall of Fame trainer D. Wayne Lukas, who went on to win more Breeders' Cup races than any other trainer in history.

== Racing career ==
Racing at age two in 1983, Life's Magic made seven starts at racetracks across the United States. After winning a maiden race, she won the Grade I Oak Leaf Stakes. She ran second four times, always in Grade I events. At age three, she won the GII Monmouth Oaks plus three Grade I events. She ran second to Princess Rooney in the 1984 Breeders' Cup Distaff and was voted the 1984 American Champion Three-Year-Old Filly.

Sent back to the track at age four, Life's Magic had her second Championship season, notably capturing the Shuvee Handicap before winning the most important race of her career under jockey Ángel Cordero Jr.: the 1985 Breeders' Cup Distaff, where she defeated the great Lady's Secret. Her 1985 performances earned Life's Magic American Champion Older Female Horse honors.

== Retirement ==
Retired to broodmare duty, a fertile Life's Magic produced fourteen offspring, none of which came close to achieving her success. Life's Magic died at age twenty-six on August 21, 2007, at Trackside Farm in Versailles, Kentucky.
