= Sacahuista =

American-bred Thoroughbred racehorse

- Sire: Raja Baba
- Grandsire: Bold Ruler
- Dam: Nalees Flying Flag
- Damsire: Hoist The Flag
- Sex: Filly
- Foaled: May 3, 1984; Kentucky
- Died: 2008
- Country: United States
- Color: Bay
- Breeder: William S. Farish III & G. Watts Humphrey Jr.
- Owner: Barry A. Beal & Lloyd R. French Jr.
- Trainer: D. Wayne Lukas
- Record: 21:6-7-2
- Earnings: $1,298,842

Major wins
- Oak Leaf Stakes (1986); Schuylerville Stakes (1986); Adirondack Stakes (1986); Spinster Stakes (1987); Breeders' Cup wins: Breeders' Cup Distaff (1987)

Awards
- American Champion Three-Year-Old Filly (1987)
- Last updated on September 6, 2008

Sacahuista (May 3, 1984 – c. 2008) was an American Thoroughbred racemare who won the 1987 Breeders' Cup Distaff.

== Background ==
Sacahuista was foaled on May 3, 1984, by Naylees Flying Flag, and sired by Raja Baba. She was a descendant of Nearco through both her Champion sire Bold Ruler, as well as through her dam Nalees Flying Flag.

Sacahuista was purchased as a yearling for $670,000 by future National Museum of Racing and Hall of Fame inductee D. Wayne Lukas for owners Barry Beal and Lloyd French Jr.

== Racing career ==
=== 1986 ===
Sacahuista made nine starts at age two, of which she won four and was second in three. Sent off as the parimutuel betting favorite in the 1986 Breeders' Cup Juvenile Fillies at Santa Anita Park under jockey Laffit Pincay Jr., she finished fourth behind winner Brave Raj.

=== 1987 ===
When she raced at age three, Sacahuista's official record shows she won two of nine starts but in fact she finished first in both the Cotillion Handicap and the Ruffian Handicap but was disqualified for interference. Under jockey Randy Romero, she then won the Grade I Spinster Stakes before capturing the Breeders' Cup Distaff at Hollywood Park Racetrack. Sacahuista's 1987 performances earned her the Eclipse Award as American Champion Three-Year-Old Filly.

=== 1988 ===
Before being retired to broodmare duty, Sacahuista raced three times at age four. Her best result was a second.

== Breeding record ==
Of her offspring, from sire Red Ransom she notably produced millionaire runner Ekraar, who won multiple stakes races in Europe, including the Italian Group One Gran Premio del Jockey Club. Through her mating to Mr. Prospector, Sacahuista is also the dam of the successful Australian-based sire Hussonet.

Foaled	Name	Sire	Sex
1991	Hussonet	Mr. Prospector	Colt
1992	Balenciaga	Gulch	Mare
1997	Ekraar	Red Ransom	Colt
1998	Dynamix	A.P. Indy	Colt
2001	Dossier	Storm Cat	Mare
2002	Jaguar On The Run	Storm Cat	Colt
2004	Parading Lady	Storm Cat	Mare

== Death ==
She is believed to have died around 2008.
