= Easy Goer =

American Thoroughbred racehorse

- Easy Goer winning the 1989 Gotham Stakes
- Sire: Alydar (US)
- Grandsire: Raise a Native (US)
- Dam: Relaxing (US)
- Damsire: Buckpasser (US)
- Sex: Stallion
- Foaled: Mar. 21, 1986
- Died: May 12, 1994 (aged 8)
- Country: United States
- Colour: Chestnut
- Breeder: Ogden Phipps
- Owner: Ogden Phipps
- Racing colors
- Trainer: Claude R. "Shug" McGaughey III
- Record: 20: 14-5-1
- Earnings: $4,873,770

Major wins
- Champagne Stakes (1988); Cowdin Stakes (1988); Gotham Stakes (1989); Swale Stakes (1989); Travers Stakes (1989); Jockey Club Gold Cup (1989); Wood Memorial Stakes (1989); Whitney Handicap (1989); Woodward Stakes (1989); Suburban Handicap (1990); Triple Crown race wins: Belmont Stakes (1989)

Awards
- U.S. Champion 2-Yr-Old Colt (1988)

Honours
- United States Racing Hall of Fame inductee (1997) #34 – Top 100 U.S. Racehorses of the 20th Century; Easy Goer Stakes at Belmont Park; Timeform rating: 137

Easy Goer (March 21, 1986 – May 12, 1994) was an American Champion Hall of Fame Thoroughbred racehorse known for earning American Champion Two-Year-Old Colt honors in 1988, and defeating 1989 American Horse of the Year Sunday Silence in the Belmont Stakes by eight lengths. Both horses were later voted into the American Hall of Fame. He is known for his excellence in New York, with running the fastest mile on dirt by any three-year-old in the history in the Gotham Stakes with a time of 1:32 2/5, the only horse in racing history to win the Belmont, Whitney, Travers, Woodward and Jockey Club Gold Cup, among others.

In the Blood-Horse List of the Top 100 U.S. Racehorses of the 20th Century, Easy Goer is ranked #34.

He won 14 of his 20 races, including nine Grade I wins at distances of seven furlongs(1.4km), eight furlongs(1.6km), nine furlongs(1.8km), ten furlongs(2km) and twelve furlongs(2.4km), and placed second five times. His Hall of Fame jockey Pat Day considers Easy Goer to be the best horse he ever rode, and the best horse his Hall of Fame Shug McGaughey trainer ever trained.

== Background ==
Bred and owned by Ogden Phipps, Easy Goer was a son of Alydar out of the 1981 American Champion Older Female Horse Relaxing (by Buckpasser). He was trained by Shug McGaughey and ridden by Pat Day.

Blood-Horse pedigree analyst Avalyn Hunter's assessment of Easy Goer was that "Easy Goer combined blistering speed over a mile with thoroughly genuine stamina."

Before his career began, Easy Goer was shipped to McGaughey at the Payson Park Training Center in Indiantown, Florida, where he spent the winter getting acquainted with the starting gate and underwent basic training. His trainer noted some faults in his conformation. He had puffy, problematic ankles, a clubfoot, and a turned-out left knee, all providing the potential for injury once the horse began serious workouts. However, McGaughey was captivated with Easy Goer the first time he saw him, but really felt he had something special when he watched him for the first time with a set of horses. "He gave the impression he could gallop those horses to death," McGaughey said.

=== Appearance and Conformation ===
Easy Goer is highly regarded as one of the best looking horses turf writers have ever seen, despite his chronic ankle problems.

McGaughey described Easy Goer as, "His action was so athletic, so natural, so fluid; he glided over the track; he ran very fast and did it so easily.

Racing writer Steve Haskin described Easy Goer as "Adonis-like, the closest thing physically to Secretariat. He was plagued by terrible ankles his entire career, but was placed upon a throne at an early age and justified all the adoration.

Racing writer Edward L. Bowen said: "Easy Goer was a glowing chestnut with a fluid stride that belied his short pasterns and less than perfect foot. Pasterns notwithstanding, he had the look of greatness, and he ran to his looks. He was a horse who tempted horsemen and fans to slip into their thoughts the phrase, 'the most perfect horse you can imagine.' Easy Goer was large but not too large. He was elegant but not dainty. He was powerful but not gross. To the aesthete taking in the whole rather than haggling over the parts, the dictionary simply proved inadequate: Easy Goer was not just perfect, he was "damned perfect".

Joe Drape of The New York Times described Easy Goer as a "powerful, massive, raw talent with an enormous stride".

Bud Delp, trainer of Spectacular Bid, said, "I hadn't seen the kind of pistonlike action in a horse since Spectacular Bid. Easy Goer had the same kind of stride, which was effortless."

== Racing career ==
His running style was multifaceted and flexible, and he was able to adjust to racing conditions; he could go to the lead or come from behind, he was able to put pressure on speed horses and stay with a faster pace, or drop back if needed. Among his peak performances, Easy Goer ran 124 and 122 Beyer Speed Figures. Easy Goer also routinely ran in the 120 Beyer Speed Figure range on a regular basis in his races. Easy Goer ran the fastest Beyer Speed Figure performance by any two-year-old, as well as the fastest Beyer Speed Figure performance in any Triple Crown race since Beyer racing figures were first published.

=== 1988: Two-Year-Old Season ===
Easy Goer won his maiden race at seven furlongs(1.4km) at Saratoga Race Course under a hand ride in a final time of 1:22 3/5, defeating Is It True by two and a half lengths after being forwardly placed two lengths off the early leaders and having to steady on the backstretch, and, as McGaughey stated, "Running two or three seconds faster than the other maiden race run at the same distance that day at Saratoga." Easy Goer came out of that race with a sore left shin. McGaughey was concerned because he thought he might have to stop the colt's training; however, treatment by hosing and poulticing the leg to draw out the heat was successful. McGaughey decided to wait and have Easy Goer's legs further treated after the Breeders' Cup that November. Easy Goer continued to train at Saratoga.

Three weeks later, he then won a 6 1/2-furlong(1.3km) allowance race by five and a half lengths at Belmont Park, again under little urging, running one-fifth of a second off the track record in 1:15 2/5, while carrying five pounds more than his opponents. His trainer said after the race, "Then I knew I was training something special."

After another three week break, Easy Goer next won the seven-furlong(1.4km) Grade I Cowdin Stakes with little encouragement, defeating Is It True again by four lengths. Easy Goer was never more than three and a half lengths behind the early leaders, who ran quick early fractions of 22 2/5 and 45 3/5, before drawing away through the stretch. He also defeated Canadian Champion Two-Year-Old Colt Mercedes Won, who was the Hopeful Stakes and Florida Derby winner. He ran the seven furlongs(1.4km) in 1:23 3/5. The final time was more than two seconds off Devil's Bag's 1983 stakes record.

Two weeks later Easy Goer won the $557,000 one-mile(1.6km) Grade I Champagne Stakes, again defeating Is It True by four lengths, after vying for command and running a half length to a length and a half behind the leader through fast fractions of 22 4/5 and 45 3/5. He also defeated the Belmont Futurity winner Trapp Mountain and Young America Stakes winner Irish Actor. His 1:34 4/5 final time for the mile was three-fifths of a second off the Champagne stakes record, and tied for fourth-fastest in Champagne Stakes history behind Vitriolic, Seattle Slew (1:34 2/5), and Devil's Bag (1:34 1/5). Additionally, in this Champagne Stakes, Easy Goer ran the fastest Beyer Speed Figure performance (116 Beyer) of any two-year-old since Beyer racing figures were first published. Racing analyst Andrew Beyer stated, "Easy Goer was the most brilliant American two-year-old of the decade." Racing writer Steven Crist stated, "Easy Goer is among the fastest two-year-olds of the last two decades."

Three weeks after the Champagne, he finished second by a little more than a length in the 9.5 furlong(1.7km) Grade 1 Breeders' Cup Juvenile on a muddy track at Churchill Downs, losing to his frequent foe Is It True. Easy Goer had a rough time in that race, having jumped the tire tracks left by the starting gate late in the homestretch, and seemed to be struggling and uncomfortable with the muddy Churchill track.

He earned $697,500 and was named Champion two-year-old colt and was the early favorite for the Kentucky Derby. After the Breeders' Cup, he was shipped to New York to have his shins pinfired, and then sent to Gulfstream Park in Hallandale, Florida, to recuperate.

=== 1989: Three-Year-Old Season ===
At three, Easy Goer started his year in Florida by winning the Swale Stakes in the fastest seven furlongs(1.4km) of the Gulfstream Park meeting in a time of 1:22 1/5 while carrying ten pounds more than the runner up.

He then won the one mile(1.6km) Grade II Gotham Stakes by thirteen lengths in stakes and track record time while conceding nine pounds and five pounds to the second and third-place finishers respectively. He ran within one to two lengths of the leaders throughout the race, who were running a very rapid pace of 44 1/5 and 1:08 3/5, before running past them and widening away while earning another historic 118 Beyer Speed Figure, one of the fastest Beyer Speed Figures in history in a Triple Crown prep race. He won handily and his winning time of 1:32 2/5 for the mile set a new track record, a second faster than Secretariat's stakes record, the fastest mile on a dirt surface by any three-year-old Thoroughbred in history, and a fifth of a second off Dr. Fager's world record.

His next race was the mile(1.6km) and an eighth Grade I Wood Memorial. Easy Goer ran close to the lead the entire race and won by three lengths over Federico Tesio Stakes winner Rock Point. He was timed at 1:50 3/5.

Leading into the Kentucky Derby, Easy Goer had a small crack in his left front heel that was found the week leading into the Kentucky Derby. The crack was serious enough to cause discomfort and possibly keep him from running.

=== Triple Crown, and the Rivalry with Sunday Silence ===
Easy Goer is most remembered for his rivalry with Sunday Silence. The two first met in the 1989 Kentucky Derby where Sunday Silence won by 2 1/2 lengths with Easy Goer finishing second, struggling on the muddy track like he did in the Breeders' Cup the year before. Easy Goer also had traffic trouble in the race. Sunday Silence meanwhile won in spite of swerving in sharply to the left bumping into Northern Wolf, then veering out.

After the Derby, both horses returned to action two weeks later in the 1989 Preakness Stakes. Throughout Preakness week, as late as the day before the race, Easy Goer's front feet were being soaked in a tub of Epsom salts due to small scratches or cracks on both heels. His ankles and knees were also given ultrasound. Likewise, Sunday Silence also had a bruised foot. Easy Goer, after breaking in the air at the start, made a big, early move down the backstretch which catapulted him to a two-length lead over Sunday Silence with a half mile remaining, with the six-furlong(1.2km) split being run in a rapid 1:09 3/5. Sunday Silence then challenged around the far turn, with both horses running the fastest mile split in Preakness history in 1:34 1/5. Following a head to head duel for the last quarter mile, Sunday Silence won by a nose in a fast final time of 1:53 4/5. The race continues to be admired by critics and fans alike, and has since been added into Horse Racing's Top 100 Moments, placing at #70.

Jockey Pat Day was criticized for reining Easy Goer's head sideways to the right in deep stretch with a short lead right before the finish line. Day criticized himself too, calling his ride "a mistake". Bill Christine of the Los Angeles Times, and trainer McGaughey also expressed their opinions on the mistakes they thought Day made during the race. After the race, Day said, "It ran through my mind that I might lose the mount on Easy Goer," Day said. "But then I shared some thoughts--I won't tell you what--with Shug and I felt better."

After the Preakness, both rivals returned to action three weeks later in the 1989 Belmont Stakes. There was some controversy leading into the race because at the time, New York was the only state that banned all race-day drugs and medications, including Lasix which is now common place. The Hall of Fame trainer of Sunday Silence, Charlie Whittingham, was angered that the controversial veterinarian Alex Harthill, who treated Sunday Silence earlier for the Kentucky Derby and Preakness, was not licensed in New York and prohibited from practicing.

When the gate opened, both Easy Goer and Sunday Silence ran in close attendance to the pace-setting leader through swift early fractions, with Easy Goer making his move around the turn propelling himself to the lead, he then opened up a substantial lead through the stretch. Easy Goer defeated Sunday Silence by eight lengths in the time of 2:26 producing the second fastest Belmont Stakes in history, behind Secretariat, and denied Sunday Silence the Triple Crown. The jockey of Sunday Silence, Pat Valenzuela, described Easy Goer's performance as that of a superhorse. Easy Goer earned a 122 Beyer Speed Figure, the best in any Triple Crown race since these ratings were first published in 1987. Easy Goer’s win in the Belmont Stakes made him the sixth horse ever to win one U.S. Triple Crown race and finish second in the other two, joining Alsab (1942), Sword Dancer (1959), Arts and Letters (1969), Genuine Risk (1980), and Bet Twice (1987), then followed by Journalism (2025).

=== Summer and Fall Campaign ===
After taking a few months off, Easy Goer's next race was on August 5 in the mile(1.6km) and an eighth Grade I Whitney Handicap at Saratoga, defeating older horses, including Cryptoclearance, by over four lengths in near record time while earning another lofty 119 Beyer Speed Figure. McGaughey said after the race, "I don't know if I've ever seen a horse run the last eighth of a mile that fast going long on the dirt. Sometimes, you see it on the grass when a horse has gone a slow paced mile."

Two weeks later at Saratoga, he won the $1.08 million mile and a quarter(2km) Grade I Travers Stakes by three lengths also in near-record time while earning another outstanding 121 Beyer Speed Figure. It was the third fastest in Travers history, behind General Assembly and Honest Pleasure, and remains the fifth fastest all time

Easy Goer then won the $809,000 mile and a quarter(2km) Grade I Woodward Stakes by two lengths on a muddy track, again defeating older horses while carrying more weight and being stuck in traffic, boxed in on the rail and checking twice. Easy Goer's victory seemingly squashed the perception that muddy or wet tracks were his Achilles' heel. Day said after the race, "Mud is different everywhere." This was the final time the Woodward was run at the mile and a quarter distance before being permanently shortened in distance to a mile and an eighth.

Three weeks later, he won the $1.09 million mile and a half(2.4km) Grade I Jockey Club Gold Cup by four lengths on October 7, again defeating older horses, included among them were the aforementioned Cryptoclearance, who finished second. He earned another exceptional 120 Beyer Speed Figure in this race. This was the final time the Jockey Club Gold Cup was run at the mile and a half distance prior to being permanently shortened in distance to a mile and a quarter.

=== Breeders' Cup and Final Meeting with Sunday Silence ===
After going their separate ways, the rivalry with Sunday Silence concluded in the Breeders' Cup Classic, run on November 4 at 1 1/4 miles(2km). With champion honors at stake, the race was labeled "Race of the Decade" by the horse racing media. Easy Goer was favored by the wagering public based on his Belmont Stakes win and four subsequent Grade I wins, three against older horses. Sunday Silence's regular rider, Patrick Valenzuela, had recently been suspended for cocaine use, so Hall of Fame rider Chris McCarron got the mount.

After Easy Goer's summer campaign of four straight G1 wins, Sunday Silence ran twice in the five months since the Belmont, both times over a 1 1/4-mile(2km) distance—in the Grade II Swaps Stakes at Hollywood Park, where he finished second, and two months later in the Sept. 24 Super Derby at Louisiana Downs, which he won, giving him six weeks rest into the Classic.

Recovering from a slow start, Easy Goer ran 11 lengths off the lead, about seven lengths behind Sunday Silence, behind the brisk opening fractions of 22 2/5 and 46 1/5, but made a big run down the backstretch and got near his rival at the half-mile point. Sunday Silence then made a charge turning for home and gained the lead in the final furlong, with Easy Goer still trailing by four lengths. Easy Goer closed ground late but lost by a diminishing neck to Sunday Silence, with a final time of 2:00 1/5. Both Sunday Silence and Easy Goer earned brilliant 124 speed figures in the 1989 Breeders' Cup Classic, which tied for the highest speed figure earned in any Breeders' Cup race. Blushing John, the American Champion Older Dirt Male Horse that year, finished third.

The victory assured Sunday Silence Eclipse Award for Outstanding Three-Year-Old Male Horse and Horse of the Year honors for 1989. After the race, McGaughey said, "Sunday Silence had a perfect trip and we made a couple of mistakes. Pat and I agree that he made riding mistakes in the Preakness. But in the other races, there were circumstances that contributed to what happened. Maybe when Pat grabbed him after the start, the horse didn't understand what he was doing. Then Pat was content to sit and wait behind Sunday Silence, as he had done before, and the other horse got away from us. In my heart, I think Easy Goer is the better horse; I think anybody would say that if those two ran against each other ten times, each would probably win five."

Day said his ride wasn't the best, while also stating, "I've said it before, I think Easy Goer was better than Sunday Silence, despite his three to one edge in a head-to-head races. I'll go to my grave believing that. We lost two photos to him and the one in the Preakness was due to a rider error on my part."

Easy Goer's 1989 three-year-old campaign is considered by some to be the greatest in American racing history without yielding any year-end championship awards. However, debate remains today on which horse was better. With Easy Goer putting together a better racing resume, but Sunday Silence holding a 3-1 advantage when they ran against each other. Sunday Silence walked away with Eclipse Award honored for Champions Three Year Old and Horse of the Year.

=== 1990: Four-Year-Old Season ===
On May 16, 1990, Easy Goer started the season by winning the seven-furlong(1.4km) Gold Stage Stakes easily on a sloppy track by over seven lengths. Twelve days later, he was third in the Grade I Metropolitan Mile, marking the only time he did not finish either first or second in his career.

Easy Goer always had problematic ankles, and his handlers had to work overtime on them during the month. Rumors about his soundness had swirled around the track for the two weeks leading into the race. Easy Goer was beaten by a little more than a length behind eventual Horse of the Year Criminal Type and two-time sprint champion Housebuster while carrying considerably more weight than those competitors (fourteen and seven pounds, respectively).

He then won the mile and a quarter(2km) Grade I Suburban Handicap by almost four lengths ridden out in a time of 2:00 after going head and head on the lead while sprinting through fast fractions of 46.75 for a half-mile and 1:09.87 for six furlongs.

After his Suburban Handicap win, Easy Goer was retired due to a bone chip in his right front ankle. He won 14 races, including 9 Grade I wins at seven furlongs, a mile, a mile and an eighth, a mile and a quarter, and a mile and a half while earning $4,873,770.

== Stud Career and Death ==
After his retirement from racing, Easy Goer stood stud at Claiborne Farm in Paris, Kentucky. He was given the honor of occupying the Stall #1, which had housed Bold Ruler and Secretariat and would be the stall of a few other champions.

At stud, Easy Goer sired three Grade I winners and nine stakes winners (7%), from 136 foals, of which 101 were starters, and 74 were winners. While speed at distances up to a mile had been favored over "stoutness" in much American breeding, Easy Goer demonstrated speed over a mile as well as stamina. Given the combination of his pedigree and the high-quality mares to which he was bred at Claiborne, it was speculated by The Blood-Horse that he would have been even more significant as a stallion had he lived longer. Easy Goer has also been an influential broodmare sire. From 53 mares sired by Easy Goer, they have produced 23 stakes winners.

Easy Goer's grave at Claiborne Farm.

At age eight, in 1994, Easy Goer collapsed and died while jogging in his paddock at Claiborne Farm. Dr. Thomas Swerczek, the veterinary pathologist at the University of Kentucky, who conducted Easy Goer's necropsy, determined the horse died of an anaphylactic reaction to an undetermined allergen and also had cancerous tumors in multiple organs. The veterinarians were convinced the cancer did not kill Easy Goer and probably would not have been fatal for a long time. They also said fatal allergic reactions are more common than most professionals realize. Easy Goer was buried at Claiborne Farm along with Secretariat, Buckpasser, Bold Ruler and many other greats.

== Notable offspring ==
Easy Goer was the sire of these G1 winners:

- Will's Way - won the Whitney Handicap and Travers Stakes like his sire, and in turn
  - Sired Lion Tamer, winner of the Cigar Mile Handicap
- My Flag - won four Grade I races, including the 1995 Breeders' Cup Juvenile Fillies, Ashland Stakes, Coaching Club American Oaks and Gazelle Stakes, as well as the Bonnie Miss Stakes.
  - Dam of champion Storm Flag Flying, winner of the 2002 Breeders' Cup Juvenile Fillies.
- Furlough - won the Ballerina Handicap

== Notable descendants ==
Easy Goer is the broodmare sire (maternal grandsire) of these G1 winners or producers of champions:

- Corinthian - won the Breeders' Cup Dirt Mile, and Metropolitan Handicap
- Storm Flag Flying - Won the Eclipse Award Championship for top two year old filly and won four Grade I races, including the Breeders' Cup Juvenile Fillies, Frizette Stakes, Matron Stakes, and Personal Ensign Handicap.
- Funny Moon - won the Coaching Club American Oaks
- Monba - won the Blue Grass Stakes.
- Astronomer Royal - won the Group I French 2000 Guineas
- Magical Fantasy - won four Grade I races, including the Yellow Ribbon Stakes, Del Mar Oaks, Gamely Stakes, and John C. Mabee Handicap.
- Mull of Kintyre - won the Gimcrack Stakes in England and sire of Araafa, winner of the St. James's Palace Stakes and Irish 2,000 Guineas.
- Sue's Good News - won the Arlington Oaks, and is the dam of Breeders' Cup Juvenile Turf Sprint winner Bulletin and Tiz Miz Sue, who won the Ogden Phipps Handicap twice.
- Kindness - dam of Breeders' Cup Marathon winner London Bridge.
- Unbridled Jet - ranked among the leading sires in New Jersey.
- Unbridled Secret - dam of Barbara Fritchie Handicap winner My Wandy's Girl, who also was a champion three year old in Puerto Rico.
- With Flying Colors - stakes-winning dam of multiple graded stakes winner Teresa Z, winner of the Turnback The Alarm Handicap, Monmouth Oaks and Obeah Stakes.

== Accomplishments and recognition ==
Over his career, Easy Goer had many accomplishments on the track that have stood the test of time.

=== Easy Goer's Honors ===
- 1988 - Eclipse Award as American champion 2-year-old male
- 1997 - Inducted into the National Museum of Racing and Hall of Fame.
- 1999 - Ranked #34 in the Blood-Horse magazine ranking of the top 100 U.S. Thoroughbred champions of the 20th Century
- 2005 - Featured on the cover of the 2005 book, "Belmont Park: A Century of Champions."
- 2006 - Easy Goer's duel with Sunday Silence in the 1989 Preakness was ranked #70 in Horse Racing's Top 100 Moments
- 2008 - Easy Goer's rivalry with Sunday Silence was featured as the 17th chapter of Horse Racing's Greatest Rivalries (2008, Eclipse Press)
- 2013 - One of 30 inaugural horses to be recognized on the Saratoga Hoofprints Walk of Fame.
- The Easy Goer Stakes ran at Belmont Stakes from 2013 - 2020.

=== Easy Goer's Accomplishments ===
- Ran the fastest mile on dirt by any three-year-old with a time of 1:32 2/5 in the 1989 Gotham Stakes, which was one-fifth of a second off of the world record.
- Second fastest Belmont Stakes at 2:26 flat, behind Secretariat.
- First two-year-old champion to win a Triple Crown race since Spectacular Bid in 1979
- In Easy Goer's 20-race career, he was never defeated by more than 2 1/2 lengths.

== Race Record ==
Easy Goer Past Performances: 20-14-5-1, earnings $4,873,770
Date	Race	Track	Distance	Finish (Lengths)	Time
8/1/88	Maiden Special Weight	Belmont	6 Furlongs(1.2km)	2 (nose)	1:11.3
8/19/88	Maiden Special Weight	Saratoga	7 Furlongs(1.4km)	1 (2 1/2)	1:22.3
9/9/88	Allowance	Belmont	6 1/2 Furlongs(1.3km	1 (5 1/2)	1:15.2
10/1/88	G1 Cowdin Stakes	Belmont	7 Furlongs(1.4km)	1 (3)	1:23.3
10/15/88	G1 Champagne Stakes	Belmont	8 Furlongs(1.6km)	1 (4)	1:34.4
11/5/88	G1 Breeders' Cup Juvenile	Churchill Downs	8 1/2 Furlongs(1.7km)	2 (1 1/4)	1:46.3
3/4/89	Swale Stakes	Gulfstream	7 Furlongs(1.4km)	1 (8 3/4)	1:22.1
4/8/89	G2 Gotham Stakes	Aqueduct	8 Furlongs(1.6km)	1 (13)	1:32.2
4/22/89	G1 Wood Memorial	Aqueduct	9 Furlongs(1.8km)	1 (3)	1:50.3
5/6/89	G1 Kentucky Derby	Churchill Downs	10 Furlongs(2km)	2 (2 1/2)	2:05
5/20/89	G1 Preakness Stakes	Pimlico	9 1/2 Furlongs(1.9km)	2 (nose)	1:53.4
6/10/89	G1 Belmont Stakes	Belmont	12 Furlongs(2.4km)	1 (8)	2:26
8/5/89	G1 Whitney Handicap	Saratoga	9 Furlongs(1.8km)	1 (4 1/2)	1:47.2
8/19/89	G1 Travers Stakes	Saratoga	10 Furlongs(2km)	1 (3)	2:00.4
9/16/89	G1 Woodward Handicap	Belmont	10 Furlongs(2km)	1 (2)	2:01
10/7/89	G1 Jockey Club Gold Cup	Belmont	12 Furlongs(2.4km)	1 (4)	2:29.1
11/4/89	G1 Breeders' Cup Classic	Gulfstream	10 Furlongs(2km)	2 (neck)	2:00.1
5/16/90	Gold Stages Stakes	Belmont	7 Furlongs(1.4km)	1 (7 1/2)	1:22.1
5/28/90	G1 Metropolitan Handicap	Belmont	8 Furlongs(1.6km)	3 (1 3/4)	1:34.2
7/4/90	G1 Suburban Handicap	Belmont	10 Furlongs(2km)	1 (3 3/4)	2:00

== See also ==
- List of racehorses
