= Inside Information (horse) =

American-bred Thoroughbred racehorse

- Sire: Private Account
- Grandsire: Damascus
- Dam: Pure Profit
- Damsire: Key to the Mint
- Sex: Filly
- Foaled: May 23, 1991
- Died: October 14, 2017 (aged 26)
- Country: United States
- Colour: Bay
- Breeder: Ogden Mills Phipps
- Owner: Ogden Mills Phipps
- Trainer: Claude R. McGaughey III
- Record: 17: 14-1-2
- Earnings: US$1,641,805

Major wins
- Bonnie Miss Stakes (1994); Ashland Stakes (1994); Acorn Stakes (1994); Ruffian Handicap (1995); Shuvee Handicap (1995); Molly Pitcher Handicap (1995); Spinster Stakes (1995) Breeders' Cup wins: Breeders' Cup Distaff

Awards
- American Champion Older Female Horse (1995)

Honours
- U.S. Racing Hall of Fame (2008); Inside Information Stakes at Gulfstream Park

Inside Information (May 23, 1991 – October 14, 2017) was an American Hall of Fame and Champion Thoroughbred racehorse.

She was a homebred owned by Ogden Mills Phipps and trained by Hall of Fame trainer "Shug" McGaughey. Inside Information had a record of 14 wins in 17 starts. Among her accomplishments were wins in the Acorn Stakes (Grade 1) at Belmont Park, the Ashland Stakes at Keeneland Race Course, the Molly Pitcher Handicap at Monmouth Park, the Ruffian Handicap (Grade 1), and the Spinster Stakes (Grade 1). In her final start, she won the 1995 Breeders' Cup Distaff (Grade 1) at Belmont Park by a Breeders' Cup record margin of victory of over 13 lengths.

As a broodmare, Inside Information produced the Eclipse Award Champion Three Year Old Filly in 2005, Smuggler. Some of her other foals were wobblers and never made it to the race track.

Inside Information was named American Champion Older Female Horse in 1995. In 2008, she was inducted into the National Museum of Racing and Hall of Fame, the ultimate accomplishment for any American Thoroughbred.

Inside Information died at age 26 on October 14, 2017, at Claiborne Farm from natural causes due to old age.
