= Shug McGaughey =

American horse trainer

Personal information
- Born: January 6, 1951 (age 75) Lexington, Kentucky, U.S.
- Occupation: Trainer

Horse racing career
- Sport: Horse racing
- Career wins: 2,000+ (ongoing)

Major racing wins
- Apple Blossom Handicap (1978, 1995); Spinster Stakes (1983, 1984, 1995, 2008); Jockey Club Gold Cup (1985, 1989, 1993); Washington, D.C. International Stakes (1985); Alabama Stakes (1986, 1991, 1994, 2006); Champagne Stakes (1986, 1988, 1989, 2026); Diana Handicap (1986); Beldame Stakes (1987, 1988, 1993, 1994); Jamaica Handicap (1987, 1990); Breeders' Futurity Stakes (1988); Whitney Handicap (1988, 1989, 2015); Travers Stakes (1989, 1990, 1998, 2019); Wood Memorial Stakes (1989, 1998); Carter Handicap (1990); Belmont Futurity Stakes (1992); Bonnie Miss Stakes (1993, 1994, 1996, 1997); Brooklyn Handicap (1993); Turf Classic Stakes (1993); Acorn Stakes (1994, 2000); Ashland Stakes (1994, 1996, 1997); Gulfstream Park Turf Handicap (1994); Top Flight Handicap (1994, 2001, 2004); United Nations Handicap (1994); Coaching Club American Oaks (1996, 2005); Haskell Invitational Handicap (1998); Astoria Stakes (1999); Hollywood Derby (2004); Belmont Derby (2014); Metropolitan Handicap (2015) American Classics wins: Kentucky Derby (2013); Belmont Stakes (1989) Breeders' Cup wins: Breeders' Cup Distaff (1988, 1995, 2005); Breeders' Cup Juvenile (1989); Breeders' Cup Sprint (1989); Breeders' Cup Mile (1992, 1993); Breeders' Cup Juvenile Fillies (1995, 2002)

Racing awards
- Eclipse Award for Outstanding Trainer (1988)

Honours
- National Museum of Racing and Hall of Fame (2004)

Significant horses
- Easy Goer, Personal Ensign, Heavenly Prize, Inside Information, Lure, Coronado's Quest, Code of Honor, My Flag, Pine Island, Pleasant Home, Rhythm, Smuggler, Classy Cathy, Storm Flag Flying, Vanlandingham, Dancing Spree, Point of Entry, Orb, Seeking the Gold, Awe Inspiring, Honor Code

Claude R. "Shug" McGaughey III (born January 6, 1951) is an American Hall of Fame thoroughbred horse trainer.

== Biography ==
McGaughey began working as a trainer in 1979 and to date has won more than 240 graded stakes races. In 1986, he got his big break when Ogden Phipps hired him to train his stable of horses. In 1988, McGaughey won the Eclipse Award for Outstanding Trainer in the United States. Among his many wins, he has captured the Jockey Club Gold Cup three times, the Travers Stakes four times, and won the 1989 Belmont Stakes with Hall of Fame Champion Easy Goer as well as the 2013 Kentucky Derby with Orb. McGaughey's nine Breeders' Cup victories ranks him outside the top 5 trainers to D. Wayne Lukas, Bob Baffert, Aidan O’Brien, Chad Brown and Todd Pletcher. Among the other horses he has trained are back-to-back Breeders' Cup Mile winner Lure and Hall of Famer Personal Ensign. McGaughey has accomplished the rare trifecta of training a Breeders' Cup winner, her daughter, and her granddaughter in the troika of Personal Ensign, My Flag and Storm Flag Flying. In 2013 he won his first Kentucky Derby with Orb.

In 2004, McGaughey was inducted into the National Museum of Racing and Hall of Fame. At his induction ceremony, he said: "My deepest debt of gratitude always has been and always will be to the Phipps family" and "My affiliation with the Phipps family is one of the great highlights of my life. I wouldn't be here without them."
