= Private Account =

American-bred Thoroughbred racehorse

- Sire: Damascus
- Grandsire: Sword Dancer
- Dam: Numbered Account
- Damsire: Buckpasser
- Sex: Stallion
- Foaled: 1976
- Died: November 25, 2004 (aged 27–28)
- Country: United States
- Colour: Bay
- Breeder: Ogden Phipps
- Owner: Ogden Phipps
- Trainer: Angel Penna, Sr.
- Record: 13: 6-4-1
- Earnings: US$339,396

Major wins
- Jim Dandy Stakes (1979); Gulfstream Park Handicap (1980); Widener Handicap (1980)

Private Account (April 26, 1976 – November 25, 2004) was an American Thoroughbred racehorse.

== Background ==
Private Account was sired by Hall of Fame inductee Damascus, a son of another Hall of Fame horse, Sword Dancer. His dam was Numbered Account, the 1971 American Champion Two-Year-Old Filly and a daughter of yet another Hall of Fame inductee, Buckpasser. Private Account is a half-brother to Dance Number.

== Racing career ==
Private Account's wins included the Grades 1 Gulfstream Park and Widener Handicaps under jockey Jeffrey Fell.

== Stud record ==
Private Account is a sire whose progeny counts six millionaires including two Hall of Fame fillies, Personal Ensign and Inside Information.

Pedigree of Private Account
Sire Damascus	Sword Dancer	Sunglow	Sun Again
Sire Damascus	Sword Dancer	Sunglow	Rosern
Sire Damascus	Sword Dancer	Highland Fling	By Jimminy
Sire Damascus	Sword Dancer	Highland Fling	Swing Time
Sire Damascus	Kerala	My Babu	Djebel
Sire Damascus	Kerala	My Babu	Perfume
Sire Damascus	Kerala	Blade of Time	Sickle
Sire Damascus	Kerala	Blade of Time	Bar Nothing
Dam Numbered Account	Buckpasser	Tom Fool	Menow
Dam Numbered Account	Buckpasser	Tom Fool	Gaga
Dam Numbered Account	Buckpasser	Busanda	War Admiral
Dam Numbered Account	Buckpasser	Busanda	Businesslike
Dam Numbered Account	Intriguing	Swaps	Khaled
Dam Numbered Account	Intriguing	Swaps	Iron Reward
Dam Numbered Account	Intriguing	Glamour	Nasrullah
Dam Numbered Account	Intriguing	Glamour	Striking
