= Breeders' Cup Distaff =

American Thoroughbred horse race

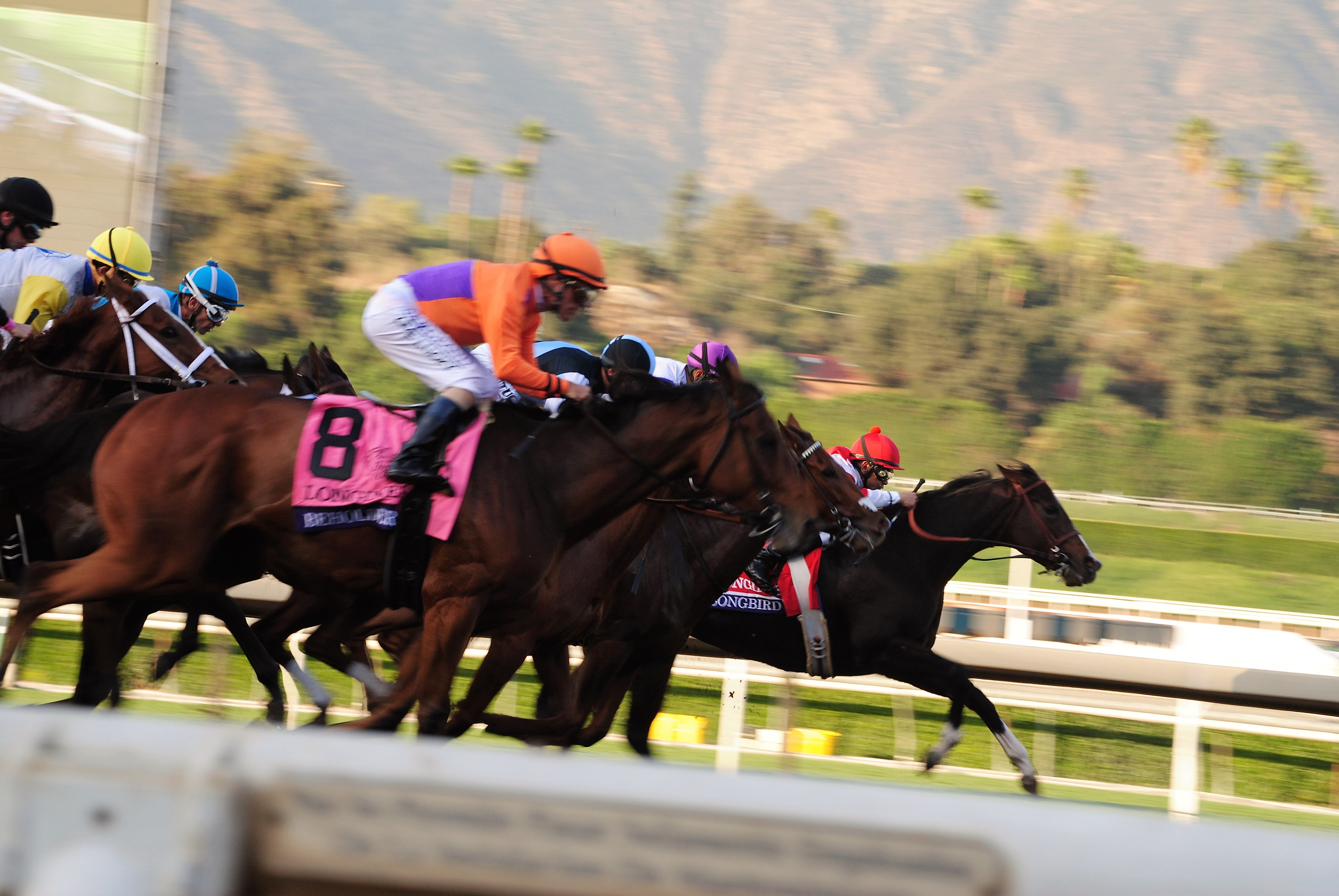
- The start of the 2016 Breeders' Cup Distaff
- Class: Grade I
- Location: North America
- Inaugurated: 1984
- Race type: Thoroughbred – Flat racing

Race information
- Distance: 1 1/8 miles (9 Furlongs)
- Surface: Dirt
- Track: left-handed
- Qualification: Fillies & Mares, three-years-old & up
- Weight: Assigned
- Purse: US$2,000,000

The Breeders' Cup Distaff is a Weight for Age Thoroughbred horse race for fillies and mares, three years old and up. Known as the Breeders' Cup Ladies' Classic between 2008 and 2012, it is held annually at a different racetrack in the United States or Canada as part of the Breeders' Cup World Championships. It is the top ranked race for fillies and mares in North America, and often decides the title for champion three-year-old and / or champion older filly or mare.

Starting with the 2008 Breeders' Cup, the Distaff was the final race on the first day (Friday) of the two-day event. In 2018, it was returned to the Saturday card.

Distance : 1 1/4 miles (1984–1987); 1 1/8 miles (1988 to present).

== Automatic berths ==
In 2007, the Breeders' Cup developed the Breeders' Cup Challenge, a series of races in each division that allots automatic qualifying bids to winners of defined races. Each of the fourteen divisions has multiple qualifying races. Note though that one horse may win multiple challenge races, while other challenge winners will not be entered in the Breeders' Cup for a variety of reasons such as injury or travel considerations.

In the Distaff division, runners are limited to 14 and there are up to four automatic berths. The 2022 "Win and You're In" races were:

1. Gran Premio Criadores, a Group 1 race run in May at Hipódromo Argentino de Palermo in Argentina
2. Ogden Phipps Stakes, a Grade 1 race run in June at Belmont Park in New York
3. Clement L. Hirsch Handicap, a Grade 1 race run in August at Del Mar Racetrack in California
4. Spinster Stakes, a Grade 1 race at Keeneland Race Course in Kentucky

== Records ==
Most wins:

- 2 – Bayakoa (ARG) (1989, 1990)
- 2 – Royal Delta (2011, 2012)
- 2 – Beholder (2013, 2016)
- 2 – Monomoy Girl (2018, 2020)

Stakes record: Not applicable, as the race is run at different tracks

Most wins by a jockey:

- 5 – Mike Smith (1995, 1997, 2002, 2008, 2012)

Most wins by a trainer:

- 6 – William I. Mott (1997, 1998, 2010, 2011, 2012, 2025)

Most wins by an owner:

- 3 – Allen Paulson (1997, 1998, 2002)

== Winners ==
Year	Winner	Age	Jockey	Trainer	Owner	Time	Purse	Grade	Ref
2026	Nitrogen	4	Jose Ortiz	Mark E. Casse	D J Stable	1:48.90	$2,000,000	I	
2025	Scylla	5	Junior Alvarado	William I. Mott	Juddmonte	1:48.07	$2,000,000	I	
2024	Thorpedo Anna	3	Brian Hernandez Jr.	Kenneth McPeek	Brookdale Racing, Mark Edwards, Judy B. Hicks, et al.	1:49.10	$2,000,000	I	
2023	Idiomatic	4	Florent Geroux	Brad H. Cox	Juddmonte	1:50.57	$2,000,000	I	
2022	Malathaat	4	John R. Velazquez	Todd A. Pletcher	Shadwell Stable	1:49.07	$2,000,000	I	
2021	Marche Lorraine (JPN)	5	Oisin Murphy	Yoshito Yahagi	U. Carrot Farm	1:47.67	$2,000,000	I	
2020	Monomoy Girl	5	Florent Geroux	Brad H. Cox	Michael Dubb, Monomoy Stables, Carcone Holdings, The Elkstone Group and Bethlehem Stables	1:47.84	$2,000,000	I	
2019	Blue Prize (ARG)	6	Joe Bravo	Ignacio Correas IV	Merriebelle Stable	1:50.50	$2,000,000	I	
2018	Monomoy Girl	3	Florent Geroux	Brad H. Cox	Michael Dubb, Monomoy Stables, Carcone Holdings, The Elkstone Group and Bethlehem Stables	1:49.79	$2,000,000	I	
2017	Forever Unbridled	5	John R. Velazquez	Dallas Stewart	Charles E. Fipke	1:50.25	$2,000,000	I	
2016	Beholder	6	Gary Stevens	Richard Mandella	Spendthrift Farm	1:49.22	$2,000,000	I	
2015	Stopchargingmaria	4	Javier Castellano	Todd A. Pletcher	Town And Country Farms	1:48.98	$2,000,000	I	
2014	Untapable	3	Rosie Napravnik	Steven M. Asmussen	Winchell Thoroughbreds	1:48.68	$2,000,000	I	
2013	Beholder	3	Gary Stevens	Richard Mandella	Spendthrift Farm	1:47.77	$2,000,000	I	
2012	Royal Delta	4	Mike E. Smith	William I. Mott	Besilu Stables	1:48.80	$2,000,000	I	
2011	Royal Delta	3	Jose Lezcano	William I. Mott	Palides Investments	1:50.78	$2,000,000	I	
2010	Unrivaled Belle	4	Kent Desormeaux	William I. Mott	Gary Seidler & Pete Vegso	1:50.04	$2,000,000	I	
2009	Life Is Sweet	4	Garrett K. Gomez	John Shirreffs	Pam & Martin Wygod	1:48.58	$2,000,000	I	
2008	Zenyatta	4	Mike E. Smith	John Shirreffs	Ann & Jerry Moss	1:46.85	$2,000,000	I	
2007	Ginger Punch	4	Rafael Bejarano	Robert J. Frankel	Stronach Stables	1:50.11	$2,000,000	I	
2006	Round Pond	4	Edgar Prado	Michael R. Matz	Fox Hill Farm	1:50.50	$2,000,000	I	
2005	Pleasant Home	4	Cornelio Velásquez	Claude R. McGaughey III	Ogden Mills Phipps	1:48.34	$2,000,000	I	
2004	Ashado	3	John R. Velazquez	Todd A. Pletcher	Starlight Stables	1:48.26	$1,000,000	I	
2003	Adoration	4	Pat Valenzuela	David Hofmans	Amerman Racing	1:49.17	$1,000,000	I	
2002	Azeri	4	Mike E. Smith	Laura de Seroux	Allen E. Paulson	1:48.64	$1,000,000	I	
2001	Unbridled Elaine	3	Pat Day	Dallas Stewart	Roger J. Devenport	1:49.21	$1,000,000	I	
2000	Spain	3	Victor Espinoza	D. Wayne Lukas	The Thoroughbred Corp.	1:47.66	$1,000,000	I	
1999	Beautiful Pleasure	4	Jorge F. Chavez	John T. Ward Jr.	John C. Oxley	1:47.56	$1,000,000	I	
1998	Escena	5	Gary Stevens	William I. Mott	Allen E. Paulson	1:49.89	$1,000,000	I	
1997	Ajina	3	Mike E. Smith	William I. Mott	Allen E. Paulson	1:47.20	$1,000,000	I	
1996	Jewel Princess	4	Corey Nakatani	Wallace Dollase	M & R Stephen & The Thoroughbred Corp.	1:48.40	$1,000,000	I	
1995	Inside Information	4	Mike E. Smith	Claude R. McGaughey III	Ogden Mills Phipps	1:46.15	$1,000,000	I	
1994	One Dreamer	6	Gary Stevens	Thomas F. Proctor	Glen Hill Farm	1:50.79	$1,000,000	I	
1993	Hollywood Wildcat	3	Ed Delahoussaye	Neil Drysdale	Irving & Marjorie Cowan	1:48.35	$1,000,000	I	
1992	Paseana (ARG)	5	Chris McCarron	Ron McAnally	Sidney H. Craig	1:48.17	$1,000,000	I	
1991	Dance Smartly	3	Pat Day	James E. Day	Sam-Son Farm	1:50.95	$1,000,000	I	
1990	Bayakoa (ARG)	6	Laffit Pincay Jr.	Ron McAnally	Frank & Janis Whitham	1:49.20	$1,000,000	I	
1989	Bayakoa (ARG)	5	Laffit Pincay Jr.	Ron McAnally	Frank & Janis Whitham	1:47.40	$1,000,000	I	
1988	Personal Ensign	4	Randy Romero	Claude R. McGaughey III	Ogden Phipps	1:52.00	$1,000,000	I	
1987	Sacahuista	3	Randy Romero	D. Wayne Lukas	B. A. Beal & L. R. French	2:02.80†	$1,000,000	I	
1986	Lady's Secret	4	Pat Day	D. Wayne Lukas	Gene Klein	2:01.20†	$1,000,000	I	
1985	Life's Magic	4	Ángel Cordero Jr.	D. Wayne Lukas	Mel Hatley & Gene Klein	2:02.00†	$1,000,000	I	
1984	Princess Rooney	4	Ed Delahoussaye	Neil Drysdale	Paula J. Tucker	2:02.40†	$1,000,000	I	

† – 1984, 1985, 1986, 1987 races were run at 1 1/4 miles

== See also ==
- Breeders' Cup Distaff "top three finishers" and starters
- American thoroughbred racing top attended events
