= 2019 Breeders' Cup Challenge series =

Series of horse races

The 2019 Breeders' Cup Challenge series consisted of 86 horse races that provided the respective winners with an automatic "Win and You're In" Berth in the 2019 Breeders' Cup, held on November 1 and 2. Races were chosen by the Breeders' Cup organization and included key races in the various Breeders' Cup divisions from around the world. The Breeders' Cup organization paid the Breeders' Cup entry fee for the challenge race winners, provided they had been nominated as foals.

== Summary ==
The 2019 Breeders' Cup Challenge series consisted of 86 races, 64 of which were Grade/Group One, from across 11 countries. There were 7 new races from the 2018 Series: the Gran Premio International Carlos Pellegrini (Turf), Prix Morny (Juvenile Turf Sprint), Fourstardave (Mile), Jockey Club Derby (Turf), the Kentucky Downs Turf Sprint (Turf Sprint), Cotillion (Distaff), Prix de l'Abbaye de Longchamp (Turf Sprint) and Prix de l'Arc de Triomphe (Turf). The following races were removed from the series: Doncaster Mile, Legacy Stakes, Gran Premio 25 de Mayo, Highlander, Forego, Spinaway, and Joe Hirsch Turf Classic. The International Stakes, formerly a qualifier for the Turf, became the first ever European qualifier for the Classic.

On October 21, fifty of the Challenge race winners were pre-entered in one or more of the Breeders' Cup races. Shortly before entries were taken, Magical – a leading contender in the Turf – was retired after spiking a fever.

Entries were taken on October 28. Several challenge race winners opted to enter a different division of the Breeders' Cup. For example, Omaha Beach, who qualified for the Sprint by winning the Santa Anita Sprint Championship, was instead entered in the Dirt Mile. Conversely, Catalina Cruiser and Mitole qualified for the Dirt Mile but instead were entered in the Sprint. Uni ran in the Mile instead of the Breeders' Cup Filly and Mare Turf. Elate was entered in the Classic after qualifying in the Distaff.

On Friday, two automatic qualifiers won their respective division of the Breeders' Cup. On Saturday, there were another three:

- Four Wheel Drive, who qualified by winning the Belmont Futurity, won the Juvenile Turf Sprint
- British Idiom, winner of the Alcibiades, also won the Juvenile Fillies
- Iridessa, who qualified by winning the Matron Stakes, won the Filly and Mare Turf
- Blue Prize won the Distaff after qualifying in the Spinster
- Bricks and Mortar qualified by winning the Arlington Million and then won the Turf

Mitole, who qualified for the Dirt Mile by winning the Metropolitan Handicap, won the Sprint. Uni won the Mile after qualifying in the First Lady Stakes for the Filly and Mare Turf.

== Challenge Series races ==
The following table shows the Breeders' Cup Challenge races for 2019 and the respective winners. The status column shows whether the horse was subsequently entered in the corresponding Breeders' Cup race, and whether they finished in the money.

Month	Race	Track	Location	Division	Winner	Status
December	Gran Premio Internacional Carlos Pellegrini	San Isidro	Argentina	Breeders' Cup Turf	Il Mercato (ARG)	bypass
January	Paddock Stakes	Kenilworth	South Africa	Breeders' Cup Filly & Mare Turf	Oh Susanna (AUS)	bypass
January	Queen's Plate	Kenilworth	South Africa	Breeders' Cup Mile	Do It Again (SAF)	bypass
February	February Stakes	Tokyo	Japan	Breeders' Cup Classic	Inti (JPN)	bypass
May	Gran Premio Criadores	Palermo	Argentina	Breeders' Cup Distaff	Entropia (ARG)	bypass
May	Gran Premio Club Hipico Falabella	Santiago	Chile	Breeders' Cup Mile	Tamburo Di Oro	bypass
May	Shoemaker Mile	Santa Anita	California	Breeders' Cup Mile	Bolo	scratched
June	Yasuda Kinen	Tokyo	Japan	Breeders' Cup Mile	Indy Champ	bypass
June	Jaipur Invitational	Belmont Park	New York	Breeders' Cup Turf Sprint	World of Trouble	retired
June	Ogden Phipps Stakes	Belmont Park	New York	Breeders' Cup Distaff	Midnight Bisou	second
June	Metropolitan Handicap	Belmont Park	New York	Breeders' Cup Dirt Mile	Mitole	won Sprint
June	Grande Prêmio Brasil	Hipódromo da Gávea	Brazil	Breeders' Cup Turf	George Washington (BRZ)	bypass
June	Fleur de Lis Handicap	Churchill Downs	Kentucky	Breeders' Cup Distaff	Elate	fourth in Classic
June	Stephen Foster Handicap	Churchill Downs	Kentucky	Breeders' Cup Classic	Seeking the Soul	ran
June	Queen Anne Stakes	Royal Ascot	England	Breeders' Cup Mile	Lord Glitters (FR)	ran
June	Prince of Wales's Stakes	Royal Ascot	England	Breeders' Cup Turf	Crystal Ocean (GB)	bypass
June	Norfolk Stakes	Royal Ascot	England	Breeders' Cup Juvenile Turf Sprint	A'Ali (IRE)	ran
June	Diamond Jubilee Stakes	Royal Ascot	England	Breeders' Cup Turf Sprint	Blue Point (IRE)	retired
June	Takarazuka Kinen	Hanshin	Japan	Breeders' Cup Turf	Lys Gracieux	bypass
June	Gran Premio Pamplona	Monterrico	Peru	Breeders' Cup Filly & Mare Turf	Gracia Divina	bypass
June	Princess Rooney Handicap	Gulfstream Park	Florida	Breeders' Cup Filly & Mare Sprint	Stormy Embrace	bypass
July	John A. Nerud	Belmont Park	New York	Breeders' Cup Sprint	Promises Fulfilled	bypass
July	Haskell Invitational	Monmouth	New Jersey	Breeders' Cup Classic	Maximum Security	bypass
July	King George VI and Queen Elizabeth Stakes	Ascot	England	Breeders' Cup Turf	Enable	bypass
July	Bing Crosby Handicap	Del Mar	California	Breeders' Cup Sprint	Cistron	bypass
July	Clement L. Hirsch Stakes	Del Mar	California	Breeders' Cup Distaff	Ollie's Candy	fourth
July	Sussex Stakes	Goodwood	England	Breeders' Cup Mile	Too Darn Hot	bypass
August	Whitney Handicap	Saratoga	New York	Breeders' Cup Classic	McKinzie	second
August	Beverly D. Stakes	Arlington	Illinois	Breeders' Cup Filly & Mare Turf	Sistercharlie	third
August	Arlington Million	Arlington	Illinois	Breeders' Cup Turf	Bricks and Mortar	won
August	Fourstardave Handicap	Saratoga	New York	Breeders' Cup Mile	Got Stormy	second
August	Prix Jacques Le Marois	Deauville	France	Breeders' Cup Mile	Romanised (IRE)	bypass
August	Pacific Classic	Del Mar	California	Breeders' Cup Classic	Higher Power	third
August	Del Mar Handicap	Del Mar	California	Breeders' Cup Turf	Acclimate	ran
August	Prix Morny	Deauville	France	Breeders' Cup Juvenile Turf Sprint	Earthlight	bypass
August	Juddmonte International	York	England	Breeders' Cup Classic	Japan	bypass
August	Yorkshire Oaks	York	England	Breeders' Cup Filly & Mare Turf	Enable	bypass
August	Nunthorpe Stakes	York	England	Breeders' Cup Turf Sprint	Battaash	bypass
August	Personal Ensign Stakes	Saratoga	New York	Breeders' Cup Distaff	Midnight Bisou	second
August	Ballerina Stakes	Saratoga	New York	Breeders' Cup Filly & Mare Sprint	Come Dancing	ran
August	Sword Dancer	Saratoga	New York	Breeders' Cup Turf	Annals of Time	bypass
August	Pat O'Brien Handicap	Del Mar	California	Breeders' Cup Dirt Mile	Catalina Cruiser	ran in Sprint
September	Kentucky Downs Turf Sprint	Kentucky Downs	Kentucky	Breeders' Cup Turf Sprint	Totally Boss	ran
September	Jockey Club Derby	Belmont	New York	Breeders' Cup Turf	Spanish Mission	bypass
September	Juvenile Stakes	Leopardstown	Ireland	Breeders' Cup Juvenile Turf	Mogul	bypass
September	Matron Stakes	Leopardstown	Ireland	Breeders' Cup Filly & Mare Turf	Iridessa (IRE)	won
September	Irish Champion Stakes	Leopardstown	Ireland	Breeders' Cup Turf	Magical (IRE)	retired
September	Iroquois Stakes	Churchill Downs	Kentucky	Breeders' Cup Juvenile	Dennis' Moment	ran
September	Pocahontas Stakes	Churchill Downs	Kentucky	Breeders' Cup Juvenile Fillies	Lazy Daisy	ran
September	Woodbine Mile	Woodbine	Canada	Breeders' Cup Mile	El Tormenta	ran
September	Moyglare Stud Stakes	Curragh	Ireland	Breeders' Cup Juvenile Fillies Turf	Love	bypass
September	Flying Five Stakes	Curragh	Ireland	Breeders' Cup Turf Sprint	Fairyland (IRE)	bypass
September	Natalma Stakes	Woodbine	Canada	Breeders' Cup Juvenile Fillies Turf	Abscond	ran
September	Summer Stakes	Woodbine	Canada	Breeders' Cup Juvenile Turf	Decorated Invader	fourth
September	Cotillion Stakes	PARX	Pennsylvania	Breeders' Cup Distaff	Street Band	ran
September	American Pharoah Stakes	Santa Anita	California	Breeders' Cup Juvenile	Eight Rings	ran
September	Chandelier Stakes	Santa Anita	California	Breeders' Cup Juvenile Fillies	Bast	third
September	Rockfel Stakes	Newmarket	England	Breeders' Cup Juvenile Fillies Turf	Daahyeh (GB)	second
September	Royal Lodge Stakes	Newmarket	England	Breeders' Cup Juvenile Turf	Royal Dornoch (IRE)	bypass
September	Vosburgh Stakes	Belmont Park	New York	Breeders' Cup Sprint	Imperial Hint	scratched
September	Jockey Club Gold Cup	Belmont Park	New York	Breeders' Cup Classic	Code of Honor	ran
September	Rodeo Drive Stakes	Santa Anita	California	Breeders' Cup Filly & Mare Turf	Mirth	ran
September	Awesome Again Stakes	Santa Anita	California	Breeders' Cup Classic	Mongolian Groom	entered
September	Sprinters Stakes	Nakayama	Japan	Breeders' Cup Turf Sprint	Tower of London (JPN)	bypass
September	Zenyatta Stakes	Santa Anita	California	Breeders' Cup Distaff	Paradise Woods	ran
October	Phoenix Stakes	Keeneland	Kentucky	Breeders' Cup Sprint	Engage	fourth
October	Alcibiades Stakes	Keeneland	Kentucky	Breeders' Cup Juvenile Fillies	British Idiom	won
October	First Lady Stakes	Keeneland	Kentucky	Breeders' Cup Filly & Mare Turf	Uni (GB)	won the Mile
October	Thoroughbred Club of America Stakes	Keeneland	Kentucky	Breeders' Cup Filly & Mare Sprint	Spiced Perfection	fourth
October	Shadwell Turf Mile Stakes	Keeneland	Kentucky	Breeders' Cup Mile	Bowies Hero	ran
October	Breeders' Futurity Stakes	Keeneland	Kentucky	Breeders' Cup Juvenile	Maxfield	injured
October	Champagne Stakes	Belmont Park	New York	Breeders' Cup Juvenile	Tiz the Law	bypass
October	Santa Anita Sprint Championship	Santa Anita	California	Breeders' Cup Sprint	Omaha Beach	second in Dirt Mile
October	Prix de l'Abbaye de Longchamp	Longchamp	France	Breeders' Cup Turf Sprint	Glass Slippers (GB)	bypass
October	Prix de l'Opéra	Longchamp	France	Breeders' Cup Filly & Mare Turf	Villa Marina (GB)	ran
October	Prix Jean-Luc Lagardère	Longchamp	France	Breeders' Cup Juvenile Turf	Victor Ludorum (GB)	bypass
October	Prix Marcel Boussac	Longchamp	France	Breeders' Cup Juvenile Fillies Turf	Albigna (Ire)	fourth
October	Prix de l'Arc de Triomphe	Longchamp	France	Breeders' Cup Turf	Waldgeist (GB)	bypass
October	Indian Summer Stakes	Keeneland	Kentucky	Breeders' Cup Juvenile Turf Sprint	Kimari	fourth
October	Bourbon Stakes	Keeneland	Kentucky	Breeders' Cup Juvenile Turf	Peace Achieved	ran
October	Spinster Stakes	Keeneland	Kentucky	Breeders' Cup Distaff	Blue Prize (ARG)	won
October	Belmont Futurity	Belmont Park	New York	Breeders' Cup Juvenile Turf Sprint	Four Wheel Drive	won
October	Frizette Stakes	Belmont Park	New York	Breeders' Cup Juvenile Fillies	Wicked Whisper	ran
October	Flower Bowl	Belmont Park	New York	Breeders' Cup Filly & Mare Turf	Sistercharlie (IRE)	third
October	Speakeasy Stakes	Santa Anita	California	Breeders' Cup Juvenile Turf Sprint	El Tigre Terrible	bypass
October	Jessamine Stakes	Keeneland	Kentucky	Breeders' Cup Juvenile Fillies Turf	Sweet Melania	third

== Television coverage ==
For the 2019 Breeders' Cup Challenge, NBCSN will produce 11 live broadcasts, covering more than 20 of the races in North America. The races will also be live streamed. This is in addition to NBC's coverage of the American Triple Crown series and Royal Ascot, the latter of which has four Breeders' Cup Challenge races.

== See also ==
- 2019 British Champions Series
