= Shedaresthedevil =

American racehorse

- Sire: Daredevil
- Grandsire: More Than Ready
- Dam: Starship Warpspeed
- Damsire: Congrats
- Sex: Mare
- Foaled: March 2, 2017 (age 9)
- Country: United States
- Color: Bay
- Breeder: WinStar Farm
- Owner: 1. Flurry Racing, Qatar Racing & Big Aut Farms; 2. Whisper Hill Farm, Qatar Racing & Flurry Racing Stables
- Trainer: Brad H. Cox
- Record: 21: 10–3–6
- Earnings: $2,829,458

Major wins
- Honeybee Stakes (2020); Indiana Oaks (2020); Kentucky Oaks (2020); Azeri Stakes (2021); La Troienne Stakes (2021); Clement L. Hirsch Stakes (2021); Locust Grove Stakes (2021); Fleur de Lis Stakes (2022)
- Last updated on 7 August 2022

Shedaresthedevil (foaled March 2, 2017) is an American thoroughbred racehorse, best known for winning the 2020 Kentucky Oaks, the filly equivalent of the Kentucky Derby. She also won the Honeybee Stakes and Indiana Oaks at age three, the Azeri and La Troienne Stakes at age four, and the Fleur de Lis Stakes at age five.

== Background ==
Shedaresthedevil was bred in Kentucky by WinStar Farm. She was from the first crop sire by Daredevil, who originally stood at WinStar before being exported to Turkey for the 2020 season. In part due to the success of Shedaresthedevil, Daredevil was brought back to Lane's End Farm in the United States for 2021. Shedaresthedevil is out of Starship Warpspeed by Congrats.

She was sold as a weanling at the 2017 Keeneland November sales to Big Cuse Bloodstock for $100,000. As a yearling, she was offered at the 2018 Keeneland September sales but did not meet her reserve on a final bid of $20,000. At age two, she raced for Glencrest Farm and was initially trained by Norm Casse in Kentucky. After her maiden race win, her owners sent her to Simon Callaghan in California. In November 2019, she was sold as a breeding or racing prospect for $280,000 to a partnership of Flurry Racing Stables (Staton Flurry), Big Aut Farms (Autry Lowry) and Qatar Racing. Her new owners put her into training with Brad Cox. In November 2021, she was sold for $5,000,000 to Mandy Pope's Whisper Hill Farm. She was kept in racing in 2022 with Cox under an ownership group of Flurry Racing, Qatar Racing and Whisper Hill Farm.

== Racing career ==
=== 2019: two-year-old season ===
Shedaresthedevil made her first start on June 13, 2019, in a maiden special weight race at Churchill Downs. She ran a few lengths behind the early pace set by Collude while racing on the inside, then swung out four wide as the field turned into the stretch. She took the lead in midstretch and drew off to win by 3 1/4 lengths.

She was then relocated to California, where she finished third in the Sorrento Stakes on August 3, fourth in the Del Mar Juvenile Fillies Turf and second in the Anoakia Stakes.

=== 2020: three-year-old campaign ===
Now trained by Brad Cox, Shedaresthedevil made her three-year-old debut on February 15, 2020, in an allowance race at Oaklawn Park. She chased the early pace and took the lead in midstretch but could not hold off the closing drive of Bonny South, finishing second by three-quarters of a length.

She finally broke her losing streak in the Honeybee Stakes at Oaklawn Park on March 7. Jockey Joseph Talamo settled her off the early pace along the rail and waited for a hole to open. Still in fifth place as they entered the stretch, he guided her between horses to find racing room. Shedaresthedevil accelerated and drew clear to win by three-quarters of a length.

In mid-March, racing in North America was disrupted by the COVID-19 pandemic, causing several race meetings to be shut down and the reshuffling of many other events. As a result, Churchill Downs announced that it would delay the Kentucky Oaks and Derby, normally held in May, to September. Oaklawn Park never closed down completely, but did reschedule the Fantasy Stakes from April to May 1. In part because it was one of the few tracks still running, the Fantasy attracted a very strong field of fourteen that included two-year-old champion British Idiom and Venetian Harbor, winner of the Las Virgenes. Shedaresthedevil went off at odds of 10:1 and Swiss Skydiver, coming off a frontrunning win in the Gulfstream Park Oaks, was overlooked at odds of 16:1. Venetian Harbor set the early pace, stalked closely by Swiss Skydiver. On the other hand, Shedaresthedevil raced in midpack, stuck in traffic. She swung very wide around the final turn and closed to finish third, but was well beaten by Swiss Skydiver.

For her next start, Cox decided to enter her in an allowance race at Churchill Downs, in which she went off as the 3:2 favorite. In a change for her usual tactics, Shedaresthedevil went to the early lead and was never challenged, drawing off to win by six lengths. She followed up in the Indiana Oaks at Indiana Grand on July 8 as the odds-on favorite. She stalked the early pace while racing three wide around the turns, then drew away in the stretch to win by five lengths. With the win, Cox was satisfied that she had earned enough points in the race to qualify on the 2020 Road to the Kentucky Oaks while not having raced too hard over the summer. "I won't say we'll make it easy on her," he said, "but as easy on her as we can to try to get her into the Oaks the best way and get her there with some confidence."

The odds-on favorite for the Kentucky Oaks was Gamine, who had won the Acorn and Test in brilliant fashion, setting stakes records in both races. Swiss Skydiver was the second choice after having won the Alabama Stakes and finishing second while racing against colts in the Blue Grass Stakes. As expected, Gamine went to the early lead, racing well off the rail. Shedaresthedevil broke in at the start, then settled into second to the outside of Gamine, with Swiss Skydiver close behind in third. Turning for home, Swiss Skydiver swung to the outside while Shedaresthedevil made her move between horses and edged her way past Gamine. She then held off a closing drive from Swiss Skydiver to win by 1 1/2 lengths. Her time of 1:48.28 for 1 1/8 miles was a new stakes record. "We are so thrilled to win a race like this, again, in our backyard", said Cox, who is based at Churchill Downs. "This has been a phenomenal day with Monomoy Girl winning the La Troienne, then winning the Oaks with Shedaresthedevil. These are the days you dream of."

Shedaresthedevil faced older horses for the first time in the Spinster Stakes on October 4 at Keeneland. She went to the early lead and set a brisk pace, but tired in the stretch to finish third. "I am disappointed; she went too fast, too early", said Cox. "She never got a breather. It was a lot to ask."

=== 2021: four-year-old season ===
Shedaresthedevil was given a sixty-day layoff, then returned to light training in mid-December in Kentucky. She was shipped to Oaklawn Park on January 9, 2021, to begin training her four-year-old campaign. "She looks phenomenal", said co-owner Staton Flurry. "It seems like she enjoyed her time off and it did her well. She's put on some weight and seems very bright eyed."

Shedaresthedevil made her first start of the year in the Azeri Stakes at Oaklawn Park on March 13, 2021. She went off as the 9:5 second choice to Letruska. Shedaresthedevil went to the lead and set sensible fractions of :23.93 for the first quarter-mile and :47.79 for the half. Letruska, uncharacteristically slow at the break, gradually started closing ground in the stretch but could not get by Shedaresthedevil, who won by a head. "We caught a flyer out of the gate," said jockey Florent Geroux. "Turning for home, she gave me everything she had. She maybe got a little bit tired down the lane, but it was good for her first race off the break."

Shedaresthedevil returned to Churchill Downs for the La Troienne Stakes on April 30 as part of the Kentucky Oaks undercard. Geroux rode her hard from the starting gate to get the early lead, then slowed down the pace as they completed the half-mile in :47.94 and the three-quarters in 1:11.71. In the stretch though, Envoutante began to close ground, getting to within a head with a furlong remaining. Shedaresthedevil responded and drew clear to win by a length. "She loves to race at Churchill", said Geroux, a reference to her record of four wins from four starts at the track. "They made me work hard for this. When we turned for home, she kept her head up and I could tell she was digging in. Those other fillies came to her but she showed a lot of heart and a lot of grit and I knew she wasn't going to let them by."

In the Ogden Phipps Stakes at Belmont Park on June 5, Shedaresthedevil finished third to Letruska, who set the pace and drew away in the stretch. "That filly [Letruska] was superior," said Geroux. "I was right beside her, and at the half-mile, my filly couldn't keep up with her."

Shipping to Del Mar Racetrack in California, Shedaresthedevil was the slight favorite in a field of five. She broke sharply, then settled behind Venetian Harbor, who set fast opening fractions of :23:30 for the quarter-mile and :47.11 for the half. Shedaresthedevil started her challenge on the final turn, drawing even after three-quarters of a mile in 1:11.77. She pulled away in the final furlong to win by 2 1/2 lengths. The win gave Shedaresthedevil a "Win and You're In" berth in the Breeders' Cup Distaff.

Cox next entered her in the Locust Grove Stakes on September 18 at Churchill Downs, where she went off as the 3:5 favorite in a field of six. She took the early leading while setting moderate fractions, then withstood the closing drive of Crystal Ball to win by a neck. This extended her record at Churchill Downs to five wins from five starts. "She's a very classy filly and knows how to fight to get things done", said Cox. "She's proven how well she's done here at Churchill and this was a good spot to get her ready for the Breeders' Cup."

On November 6, Shedaresthedevil traveled back to Del Mar for the Breeders' Cup Distaff. She faced a very strong field headlined by Letruska (Apple Blossom, Ogden Phipps, Personal Ensign, Spinster Stakes), Malathaat (Kentucky Oaks, Alabama Stakes), Clairiere (Cotillion) and Royal Flag (Zenyatta Stakes). She chased the early leader, Private Mission, four wide around the clubhouse turn, and made her move while still racing four wide around the final turn. She led briefly past the five-sixteenths pole, but relinquished command around the bend and weakened in the stretch run to finish sixth to longshot Marche Lorraine.

On 9 November 2021, at the Fasig-Tipton November Sale in Lexington, Kentucky, Shedaresthedevil was sold for $5 million to Mandy Pope's Whisper Hill Farm with Qatar Racing and Flurry Racing Stables. The latter two were among the original partners to campaign the Cox trainee.

=== 2022: five-year-old season ===
Shedaresthedevil began her six-year-old campaign on March 12, 2022, in the Azeri Stakes at Oaklawn. She was the even-money favorite in a field of seven that also included sprint champion Ce Ce (Breeders' Cup Sprint) and Pauline's Pearl (Houston Ladies Classic Stakes). Shedaresthedevil set the early pace and still led turning into the stretch but could not hold off Ce Ce and a late run from Pauline's Pearl, finishing third by 1 3/4 lengths. She then finished second by a neck in the La Troienne Stakes on May 6, again being run down late by Pauline's Pearl. It was her first loss at Churchill Downs.

On July 2, Shedaresthedevil broke her losing streak in the Fleur de Lis Stakes. This time, she stalked the early pace set by Super Quick, then gradually closed ground in the stretch to win by 2 3/4 lengths, with Pauline's Pearl a further 3 1/2 lengths back in third. "We sat in a perfect position the entire way around the track," Geroux said. "Inside the eighth pole she started to find her best stride and drew away late. She's back."

However, in her next race, the Clement L. Hirsch Stakes, Shedaresthedevil finished third behind Blue Stripe. She was retired after this race.

== Breeding career ==
Shedaresthedevil was put up for auction in November 2022 at The November Sale by Fasig-Tipton, where the Whisper Hill Farm bought her for US$5 million.

She was covered by Gun Runner in 2023 for the 2024 season.

== Statistics ==
Date	Distance	Race	Grade	Track	Odds	Field	Finish	Winning Time	Winning (Losing) Margin	Jockey	Ref
2019 – Two-year-old season
Jun 13, 2019	5 1/2 furlongs	Maiden		Churchill Downs	2.60	8	1	1:04.84	3 1/4 lengths	Julien Leparoux	
Aug 3, 2019	6 furlongs	Sorrento Stakes	II	Del Mar	4.50	6	3	1:10.96	(6 lengths)	Drayden Van Dyke	
Sep 2, 2019	1 mile	Del Mar Juvenile Fillies Turf		Del Mar	1.20*	11	4	1:35.67	(5 3/4 lengths)	Flavien Prat	
Oct 13, 2019	6 furlongs	Anoakia Stakes		Santa Anita	1.10*	6	2	1:10.81	(8 1/2 lengths)	Flavien Prat	
2020 – Three-year-old season
Feb 15, 2020	1 1/16 miles	Allowance optional claiming		Oaklawn Park	3.00	10	2	1:43.93	(3/4 length)	Joseph Talamo	
Mar 7, 2020	1 1/16 miles	Honeybee Stakes	III	Oaklawn Park	2.90	8	1	1:44.38	3/4 length	Joseph Talamo	
May 1, 2020	1 1/16 miles	Fantasy Stakes	III	Oaklawn Park	10.00	14	3	1:42.00	(13 1/4 lengths)	Joel Rosario	
Jun 5, 2020	1 1/16 miles	Allowance optional claiming		Churchill Downs	1.40*	8	1	1:42.89	6 lengths	Florent Geroux	
Jul 8, 2020	1 1/16 miles	Indiana Oaks	III	Indiana Grand	0.60*	8	1	1:43.50	5 lengths	Florent Geroux	
Sep 4, 2020	1 1/8 miles	Kentucky Oaks	I	Churchill Downs	15.10	9	1	1:48.28†	1 1/2 lengths	Florent Geroux	
Oct 4, 2020	1 1/8 miles	Spinster Stakes	I	Keeneland	1.20*	6	3	1:49.76	(3 1/4 lengths)	Florent Geroux	
2021 – Four-year-old season
Mar 13, 2021	1 1/16 miles	Azeri Stakes	II	Oaklawn Park	1.80	5	1	1:42.57	head	Florent Geroux	
Apr 30, 2021	1 1/16 miles	La Troienne Stakes	I	Churchill Downs	1.70*	7	1	1:42.69	1 length	Florent Geroux	
Jun 5, 2021	1 1/16 miles	Ogden Phipps Stakes	I	Belmont Park	1.65	5	3	1:41.25	(3 3/4 lengths)	Florent Geroux	
Aug 1, 2021	1 1/16 miles	Clement L. Hirsch Stakes	I	Del Mar	1.30*	5	1	1:45.38	3 1/4 lengths	Florent Geroux	
Sep 18, 2021	1 1/16 miles	Locust Grove Stakes	III	Churchill Downs	0.60*	6	1	1:42.86†	neck	Florent Geroux	
Nov 6, 2021	1 1/8 miles	Breeders' Cup Distaff	I	Del Mar	8.40	11	6	1:47.67	(6 1/2 lengths)	Florent Geroux	
2022 – Five-year-old season
Mar 12, 2022	1 1/16 miles	Azeri Stakes	II	Oaklawn Park	1.00*	7	3	1:43.55	(1 3/4 lengths)	Florent Geroux	
May 6, 2022	1 1/16 miles	La Troienne Stakes	I	Churchill Downs	0.80*	8	2	1:42.46	(1/2 length)	Florent Geroux	
Jul 2, 2022	1 1/8 miles	Fleur de Lis Stakes	II	Churchill Downs	1.40	5	1	1:49.17	1 1/2 lengths	Florent Geroux	
Aug 6, 2022	1 1/16 miles	Clement L. Hirsch Stakes	I	Del Mar	0.80*	5	3	1:42.97	(1 3/4 lengths)	Florent Geroux	

Legend:
Dirt Turf

Notes:
† New stakes record for distance
An asterisk (*) after the odds means Shesharesthedevil was the post-time favorite.

== Pedigree ==
Pedigree of Shedaresthedevil, bay filly, foaled March 2, 2017
Sire Daredevil	More Than Ready	Southern Halo	Halo
Sire Daredevil	More Than Ready	Southern Halo	Northern Sea
Sire Daredevil	More Than Ready	Woodman's Girl	Woodman
Sire Daredevil	More Than Ready	Woodman's Girl	Becky Be Good
Sire Daredevil	Chasethewildwind	Forty Niner	Mr. Prospector
Sire Daredevil	Chasethewildwind	Forty Niner	File
Sire Daredevil	Chasethewildwind	Race the Wild Wind	Sunny's Halo
Sire Daredevil	Chasethewildwind	Race the Wild Wind	Redpath
Dam Starship Warpspeed	Congrats	A.P. Indy	Seattle Slew
Dam Starship Warpspeed	Congrats	A.P. Indy	Weekend Surprise
Dam Starship Warpspeed	Congrats	Praise	Mr. Prospector
Dam Starship Warpspeed	Congrats	Praise	Wild Applause
Dam Starship Warpspeed	Andria's Forest	Forestry	Storm Cat
Dam Starship Warpspeed	Andria's Forest	Forestry	Shared Interest
Dam Starship Warpspeed	Andria's Forest	Andriana B.	Far North
Dam Starship Warpspeed	Andria's Forest	Andriana B.	Sign Language (family 13-b)

Shesharesthedevil is inbred 4S x 5S x 4D to Mr. Prospector, meaning that Mr Prospector appears in both the fourth and fifth generation on the sire's side of the pedigree, and in the fourth generation on the dam's side. She is also inbred 4S x 5S to Halo and 5S x 5D x 5D to Northern Dancer.
