= Letruska =

American racehorse

- Sire: Super Saver
- Grandsire: Maria's Mon
- Dam: Magic Appeal
- Damsire: Successful Appeal
- Sex: Mare
- Foaled: May 9, 2016 (age 8)
- Country: United States
- Color: Bay
- Breeder: St George Stables
- Owner: St. George Stable
- Trainer: Fausto Gutierrez
- Record: 28: 19-1-2
- Earnings: US$3,053,529

Major wins
- Clasico Esmeralda (2019); Clasico Diamante (2019); Copa Invitacional del Caribe Stakes (2019); Shuvee Stakes (2020); Rampart Stakes (2020); Houston Ladies Classic (2021); Apple Blossom Handicap (2021, 2022); Ogden Phipps Stakes (2021); Fleur de Lis Stakes (2021); Personal Ensign Stakes (2021); Spinster Stakes (2021); Royal Delta Stakes (2022)

Awards
- Champion three-year-old filly in Mexico (2019); American Champion Older Dirt Female Horse (2021)
- Last updated on October 11, 2022

Letruska (foaled May 9, 2016) is a retired American-bred Thoroughbred racehorse who first made her reputation in Mexico, where she was named the champion three-year-old filly after winning the Clasico Esmeralda and Clasico Diamante in 2019. She then returned to the United States where she won the Shuvee and Rampart Stakes in 2020. In 2021, she was named the American Champion Older Dirt Female Horse after winning the Houston Ladies Classic, Apple Blossom Handicap, Ogden Phipps, Fleur de Lis, Personal Ensign Stakes and Spinster Stakes. At age six, she started 2022 with wins in the Royal Delta Stakes and Apple Blossom Handicap before losing her last three starts.

== Background ==
Letruska is a bay mare who was bred in Kentucky by St George Stables, owned by Mexican billionaire Germán Larrea Mota-Velasco. She races for St. George Stable as a homebred. She was sired by Super Saver, who won the 2010 Kentucky Derby but proved inconsistent as a sire and was eventually exported to Turkey. Prior to Letruska, his best offspring was sprint champion Runhappy. Letruska's dam, Magic Appeal, is the full sister to Grade I winner J P's Gusto and is from the family of champion Proud Spell.

Letruska is trained by Fausto Gutierrez, one of the leading trainers in Mexico.

== Racing career ==
Letruska began her career in Mexico at the Hipodromo de las Americas. She won both her starts at age two, a maiden race on October 26, 2018, and an allowance race on November 9.

=== 2019: three-year-old season ===
At age three, she made her first two starts of the year at the allowance level, winning both. She was then stepped up in class when winning the Clasico Esmeralda on June 21 and Clasico Diamante on July 20. Although these are two of the most important races for fillies in Mexico, they are not eligible for international "black type" status as the standard of racing in Mexico is generally considered inferior to that of the United States and other major racing jurisdictions. When Letruska later won the Apple Blossom Handicap, she became the first horse that had raced in Mexico to win an internationally recognized race at the Grade/Group 1 level.

In December 2019, Letruska returned to the America for the Copa Invitacional del Caribe Stakes held at Gulfstream Park on December 8. She went off as the 8-5 second choice in a field of nine. She went to the early lead and set moderate opening fractions of :25.49 for the first quarter-mile and :50.40 for the half-mile. She opened up a six length lead in midstretch and won easily by 4 1/4 lengths.

Letruska suffered her first loss in the Tropical Park Oaks on December 28 over a turf course labeled as good. She went to the early lead but tired and eventually finished last. Despite the loss, she was named the champion three-year-old filly in Mexico.

=== 2020: four-year-old season ===
Letruska began her four-year-old campaign on April 16, 2020, at Oaklawn Park with a front-running win in an allowance race at odds of 3–1. In her next start on April 30, she set a brisk pace while being pressed by Blamed, who took over the lead as they turned into the stretch. Letruska held on for third, beaten by four lengths.

Letruska returned to Gulfstream Park for the Added Elegance Stakes on June 27. She got off to an early lead and opened up on the field after running the first half mile in a fast :44.96. She was never challenged and won by 2 1/2 lengths.

On August 8, Letruska shipped to Saratoga for her first start at the Grade I level in the Ballerina Stakes, run at a sprint distance of seven furlongs. She was the fourth betting choice at odds of 5–1 in a field of seven that included multiple stakes winners Bellafina, Serengeti Empress, and Come Dancing. Letruska tracked the fast early pace set by Serengeti Empress and tired to finish fifth.

On August 30, Letruska entered the Shuvee Stakes over a distance of 1 1/8 miles. She went to the early lead and set a brisk opening pace of :46.20 for the half-mile, then held off the closing drive of Royal Flag to win by a length. "She's a filly that needs speed and distance," said Gutierrez. "This is obvious in her races here and in Mexico. In Mexico, she doesn't have the big competition, but she made very good times. I think this is the kind of race she can run. I don't know how many fillies can go with her in :46."

Letruska then traveled to Belmont Park for the Beldame Stakes on October 4. She broke poorly but then opened up a large lead on the far turn after running the opening half mile in :45.52. She tired turning into the stretch and finished a well-beaten fourth.

Letruska finished the year in the Rampart Stakes at Gulfstream Park on December 12. She went to the early lead, challenged by Bajan Girl for the first three-quarters of a mile. In the stretch, she steadily increased her lead to win by 6 3/4 lengths. "I had a big question mark about today, because after her last race in New York, I decided to remove the blinkers," said Gutierrez. "I came to the conclusion that all the time she runs she never saw the other horses. It's important how she responds when she feels the competition near her."

=== 2021: five-year-old season ===
Letruska began her five-year-old campaign by travelling to Sam Houston Race Park for the Houston Ladies Classic on January 31, 2021. Going off as the odds-on favorite, she went to the early lead and sent a moderate pace. She was challenged turning into the stretch and responded by drawing away to win by 3 1/2 lengths. "I had never ridden her before, but watched her races," said jockey Jesus Castanon. "She was comfortable the entire race and wanted to keep going once we crossed the wire."

On March 13, Letruska entered the Azeri Stakes at Oaklawn Park where she went off as the slight favorite over Shedaresthedevil, who had won the Kentucky Oaks at age three. Letruska carried top weight of 124 pounds, while Shedaresthedevil carried 119 pounds in her first start of the year. Shedaresthedevil broke well and went to the early lead while setting moderate fractions. Letruska broke a bit slowly, then moved up to press the pace while being carried three wide around the turns. In the stretch, she gradually closed ground, but Shedaresthedevil held her off to win by a head. "It was a great race," said Gutierrez. "Small things can make a difference. But anyways, [Shedaresthedevil]'s the winner of the Kentucky Oaks. We [gave her] five pounds. It's a factor. But, congratulations to the winner. We'll try the next one."

Letruska's next start was in the Apple Blossom Handicap at Oaklawn Park on April 17. The purse for the race was increased to $1 million to attract the two top-rated female racehorses in the country, champions Swiss Skydiver (Preakness Stakes, Beholder Mile) and Monomoy Girl (Breeders' Cup Distaff, Bayakoa Stakes). Letruska was the third betting choice and was assigned 118 pounds compared to 124 pounds for Monomoy Girl and 122 pounds for Swiss Skydiver. Swiss Skydiver broke in front, but Letruska then moved to the lead with Swiss Skydiver one length back on her inside and Monomoy Girl another half length back to her outside. Letruska set moderate fractions, running the first half mile in :47.96. Turning into the stretch, Swiss Skydiver started to drop back while Monomoy Girl moved closer to Letruska. The two mares dueled down the stretch, with Monomoy Girl getting her head in front with a furlong remaining. Letruska fought back and won by a nose in a photo finish.

Gutierrez had instructed jockey Irad Ortiz Jr. that even if Letruska broke poorly, he should get in front and "make the others think". After Monomoy Girl took the lead in midstretch, Gutierrez was satisfied with presumably getting second place. "I didn't see the picture very clearly," he said. "I went carefully to check the replay and I thought, 'Oops, we won.' For me, this is incredible because I come from a small racetrack in Mexico City. This horse started her career there. We had the confidence to send her here and she started to improve, improve and improve."

Letruska then shipped to New York for the Ogden Phipps Stakes, part of the undercard for the Belmont Stakes held on June 5. She became the post-time favorite after Swiss Skydiver was scratched due to a fever. She again faced Shedaresthedevil, this time at equal weights of 122 pounds. Letruska took the early lead with Shedaresthedevil half a length back on her outside. Letruska started to open her lead turning into the stretch and won by 2 3/4 lengths.

"This is back-to-back Grade I wins," noted Gutierrez. "She showed her potential. This is a speed horse that can run long distances. Today, she confirmed what we saw in the Apple Blossom. She's progressed with age and taking the blinkers off. She ran like a big horse."

On June 26, Letruska continued her winning streak in the Fleur de Lis Stakes at Churchill Downs on June 26. She went straight to the lead and set moderate fractions before opening up in the stretch to win by 5 3/4 lengths. The win established her position at the top of the older female division and had Gutierrez considering a race against male horses. "I was just sitting on her," said jockey José Ortiz.

After the win, Letruska moved to the head of the NTRA Top Thoroughbred Poll that ranks North American racehorses in training. She was later passed by Knicks Go after he won the Whitney Stakes in early August but remained the clear leader in the female division.

Letruska was given a brief layoff, then returned in the Personal Ensign Stakes at Saratoga on August 28 as the odds-on favorite in a field of nine. She ran a fast opening quarter mile in 23.01 seconds to get the early lead, pressed by Miss Marissa, Swiss Skydiver, and Harvey's Lil Goil. After the half in 46.74 and three-quarters in 1:10, her early rivals began to tire, eventually finishing well back. Letruska then held off the closing kicks of longshots Bonny South, Royal Flag, and Dunbar Road to win by half a length.

Letruska extended her winning streak to five in the Spinster Stakes on October 10 at Keeneland. Going off as the 2-5 favorite, she led from the start and was never seriously threatened on her way to a 1 3/4 length win. "She was just moving smooth out there," said Ortiz. "She didn't go that fast today but she did it easy, relaxed. Whenever I asked her she was there for me."

Gutierrez advised that Letruska would make her next start in the Breeders' Cup Distaff instead of facing male horses in the Breeders' Cup Classic. On November 6, Letruska started as the 3-2 favorite in a field of ten. Private Mission went to the early lead and ran a very fast opening quarter-mile in 21.84 seconds. Letruska pressed the pace from a length behind while racing three-wide around the first turn. After completing the first half-mile in 44.97, Letruska moved up to challenge and briefly took the lead around the final turn. However, she then tired and faded to tenth place. Gutierrez commented, "It was a very, very tough race on her, but this happens in a race as good as the Breeders' Cup."

=== 2022: six-year-old season ===
Letruska made the first start of her six-year-old campaign on February 26, 2022, in the Royal Delta Stakes at Gulfstream. She took an early lead and was never challenged, winning by three lengths. "I put her on the lead, and she relaxed well," said Ortiz. "She was full of herself. On the straight you could see I was just easing her up. She was looking around at the people inside the track and the photographers and stuff. She did everything very easy."

Gutierrez announced that he would be "more passive" with the mare in 2022, planning on a six-race campaign instead of the eight races she had run in 2021.

On April 23, connections entered her in the Apple Blossom Handicap at Oaklawn. The small field also included Ce Ce, who had won this event in 2020 and was named the 2021 American Champion Female Sprint Horse, and Grade I winner Clairiere. Letruska broke out and was a bit rank but quickly straightened to show the way past the wire the first time. Racing around the first turn in the two path, she continued to set an uncontested pace down the backstretch and remained off the rail in the second turn. Shaken up when straightened for home, she drifted down the stretch but held late under continued steady handling to defeat Clairiere by 1 1/4 lengths in a time of 1:42.22.

On June 11, Letruska faced Clairiere and Malathaat in the Grade I Ogden Phipps Stakes at Belmont Park, an event she had won the previous season. Starting as the 4-5 favorite in the field of five, she went to the lead from the start. She set a blistering pace of 22.75 seconds for the first quarter-mile and 45.23 for the half. However, with three furlongs to run she was headed by Search Results. She soon folded and was ultimately eased to the line.

On August 27 in the Grade I Personal Ensign Stakes, Letruska was made the 12/5 second favorite in a field of five that included rivals Malathaat and Clairiere. Letruska again went to the lead, but with three-sixteenths of a mile to run she was headed and ended up third behind Malathaat and Search Results.

On October 9, Letruska finished fourth in Keeneland's Spinster Stakes to Malathaat, beaten by 16 3/4 lengths. After the Spinster, it was announced that she would aim for the Breeders' Cup Filly & Mare Sprint, but on October 31 she was taken out of Breeders' Cup consideration entirely. Gutierrez said that Letruska would need 60 days of rest, at which point a decision will be made on whether she will be retired.

== Retirement ==
Letruska delivered her first foal in February 2024. The filly was out of Curlin and was delivered at Terrazas Thoroughbreds in Lexington, Kentucky.

== Statistics ==
Date	Distance	Race	Grade	Track	Odds	Field	Finish	Winning Time	Margin	Jockey	Ref
2018 – Two-year-old season
Oct 26, 2018	5 1/2 furlongs	Maiden		Hipodromo de las Americas	1.75*		1	1:05.00		G. Santos	
Nov 9, 2018	6 1/2 furlongs	Allowance		Hipodromo de las Americas	2.35*		1	1:20.40		J.L. Campos	
2019 – Three-year-old season
Apr 12, 2019	6 1/2 furlongs	Allowance		Hipodromo de las Americas	0.55*		1	1:20.60		J.L. Campos	
May 17, 2019	7 furlongs	Allowance		Hipodromo de las Americas	0.50*		1	1:29.00		J.L. Campos	
Jun 21, 2019	1 mile	Clasico Esmeralda	(MEX G1) (Note: Races in Mexico are not eligible for international "black type" status)	Hipodromo de las Americas	2.45		1	1:37.60		J.J. Gallardo	
Jul 20, 2019	1 1/16 miles	Clasico Diamante	(MEX G1) (Note: NotEligible)	Hipodromo de las Americas	0.15*		1	1:44.60		J.J. Gallardo	
Dec 8, 2019	1 1/4 miles	Copa Invitacional del Caribe Stakes	Black type	Gulfstream Park	1.60	9	1	2:04.01	4 1/4 lengths	Emisael Jaramillo	
Dec 28, 2019	1 1/16 miles (Note: Over turf)	Tropical Park Oaks	Black type	Gulfstream Park	7.30	13	13	1:42.31	(18 3/4 lengths)	Emisael Jaramillo	
2020 – Four-year-old season
Apr 16, 2020	1 1/16 miles	Allowance		Oaklawn Park	3.30	11	1	1:42.38	2 1/4 lengths	Ricardo Santana Jr.	
Apr 30, 2020	1 mile	Allowance		Oaklawn Park	1.90*	7	3	1:36.59	(4 lengths)	Stewart Elliott	
Jun 27, 2020	1 mile	Added Elegance Stakes	Black type	Gulfstream Park	2.50	8	1	1:35.46	2 1/2 lengths	Emisael Jaramillo	
Aug 8, 2020	7 furlongs	Ballerina Stakes	I	Saratoga	5.10	7	5	1:21.63	(6 1/2 lengths)	Ricardo Santana Jr.	
Aug 30, 2020	1 1/8 miles	Shuvee Stakes	III	Saratoga	3.65	9	1	1:48.94	1 length	Joel Rosario	
Oct 4, 2020	1 1/8 miles	Beldame Stakes	II	Belmont Park	1.55	4	4	1:49.01	(14 3/4 lengths)	Kendrick Carmouche	
Dec 12, 2020	1 mile	Rampart Stakes	III	Gulfstream Park	1.50*	6	1	1:35.03	6 3/4 lengths	Emisael Jaramillo	
2021 – Five-year-old season
Jan 31, 2021	1 1/16 miles	Houston Ladies Classic	III	Sam Houston	0.40*	7	1	1:45.02	3 1/2 lengths	Jesus Castanon	
Mar 13, 2021	1 1/16 miles	Azeri Stakes	II	Oaklawn Park	1.50*	5	2	1:42.57	(head)	Joel Rosario	
Apr 17, 2021	1 1/16 miles	Apple Blossom Handicap	I	Oaklawn Park	3.40	6	1	1:43.14	nose	Irad Ortiz Jr.	
Jun 5, 2021	1 1/16 miles	Ogden Phipps Stakes	I	Belmont Park	1.20*	5	1	1:41.25	2 3/4 lengths	José Ortiz	
Jun 26, 2021	1 1/8 miles	Fleur de Lis Stakes	II	Churchill Downs	0.70*	6	1	1:48.57	5 3/4 lengths	José Ortiz	
Aug 28, 2021	1 1/8 miles	Personal Ensign Stakes	I	Saratoga	0.75*	9	1	1:49.15	1/2 length	Irad Ortiz Jr.	
Oct 10, 2021	1 1/8 miles	Spinster Stakes	I	Keeneland	0.40*	6	1	1:49.01	1 3/4 lengths	Irad Ortiz Jr.	
Nov 6, 2021	1 1/8 miles	Breeders' Cup Distaff	I	Del Mar	1.70*	11	10	1:47.67	(32 lengths)	Irad Ortiz Jr.	
2022 – Six-year-old season
Feb 26, 2022	1 1/16 miles	Royal Delta Stakes	III	Gulfstream Park	0.10*	7	1	1:43.43	3 lengths	José Ortiz	
Apr 3, 2022	1 1/16 miles	Apple Blossom Handicap	I	Oaklawn Park	0.90*	5	1	1:42.22	1 1/4lengths	José Ortiz	
Jun 11, 2022	1 1/16 miles	Ogden Phipps Stakes	I	Belmont Park	0.75*	5	5	1:41.10	(35 3/4 lengths)	José Ortiz	
Aug 27, 2022	1 1/8 miles	Personal Ensign Stakes	I	Saratoga	2.40	5	3	1:48.30	(2 1/2 lengths)	José Ortiz	
Oct 9, 2022	1 1/8 miles	Spinster Stakes	I	Keeneland	3.16	5	4	1:51.05	(16 3/4 lengths)	Tyler Gaffalione	

Notes:
An asterisk (*) after the odds means Letruska was the post-time favorite.

== Pedigree ==
Pedigree of Letruska, bay mare, May 9, 2016
Sire Super Saver	Maria's Mon	Wavering Monarch	Majestic Light
Sire Super Saver	Maria's Mon	Wavering Monarch	Uncommitted
Sire Super Saver	Maria's Mon	Carlotta Maria	Caro (IRE)
Sire Super Saver	Maria's Mon	Carlotta Maria	Water Malone
Sire Super Saver	Supercharger	A.P. Indy	Seattle Slew
Sire Super Saver	Supercharger	A.P. Indy	Weekend Surprise
Sire Super Saver	Supercharger	Get Lucky	Mr. Prospector
Sire Super Saver	Supercharger	Get Lucky	Dance Number
Dam Magic Appeal	Successful Appeal	Valid Appeal	In Reality
Dam Magic Appeal	Successful Appeal	Valid Appeal	Desert Trial
Dam Magic Appeal	Successful Appeal	Successful Dancer	Fortunate Prospect
Dam Magic Appeal	Successful Appeal	Successful Dancer	Debonair Dancer
Dam Magic Appeal	Call Her Magic	Caller I.D.	Phone Trick
Dam Magic Appeal	Call Her Magic	Caller I.D.	Plagiarizing
Dam Magic Appeal	Call Her Magic	Malibu Magic	Encino
Dam Magic Appeal	Call Her Magic	Malibu Magic	Dream Harder (family 4-m)
