= Blue Prize =

American thoroughbred racehorse (2013–2026)

- Sire: Pure Prize
- Grandsire: Storm Cat
- Dam: Blues For Sale
- Damsire: Not For Sale
- Sex: Mare
- Foaled: 2013
- Died: February 15, 2026 (aged 13)
- Country: Argentina
- Breeder: Bioart S. A.
- Owner: Bioart S. A. (2016); Merriebelle Stable (2017-2019) (John Moores & Charles Noell)
- Trainer: Ignacio Correas IV
- Record: 23: 10-8-3
- Earnings: $2,692,253

Major wins
- Gran Premio Seleccion (2016); Falls City Handicap (2017); Fleur de Lis Handicap (2018); Locust Grove Handicap (2018); Spinster Stakes (2018, 2019); Top Flight Handicap (2018) Breeders' Cup wins: Breeders' Cup Distaff (2019)
- Last updated on May 13, 2021

Blue Prize (2013 – February 15, 2026) was an Argentinian Thoroughbred racehorse and the winner of the 2019 Breeders' Cup Distaff.

== Career ==
Blue Prize's first race and only start as a two-year-old (Note: Thoroughbreds racing in the Southern Hemisphere have an official foaling date on July 1, compared to January 1 for the Northern Hemisphere) was on May 30, 2016, at Hipódromo Argentino de Palermo, where she came in first.

Blue Prize finished second in her first two starts at age three. On October 10, 2016, she won the Grade-1 Argentinian Gran Premio Seleccion. She was named Argentina's champion three-year-old filly.

She was sold to Merriebelle Stable in 2017 and was relocated to the United States where she made her first start on June 11 with a second-place finish at Churchill Downs. In her next three consecutive races, she placed second.

On October 8, 2017, she came in third place at the Grade-1 Spinster Stakes. She finally captured her first American graded win at the Grade-2 Falls City Handicap on November 23 to close out her 2017 season.

She had a strong 2018 season. She won the Top Flight Handicap, the Fleur de Lis Handicap, the Locust Grove Handicap and the Grade-1 Spinster Stakes. She closed the season out with a 4th-place finish at the Grade-1 Breeders' Cup Distaff on November 13.

Blue Prize started her 2019 season with a third-place finish in the La Troienne Stakes at Churchill Downs on May 3. She tried to defend her Fleur de Lis Handicap crown in June, but came in second. She then finished third in the July 13 Delaware Handicap.

Blue Prize's 2019 season picked up though in August with a win at the Summer Colony Stakes at Saratoga. This was the first of a three-race winning streak. Her next win came on October 6 when she successfully defended her Spinster Stakes title at Keeneland. On November 2, she finished out the 2019 season with a win at the Grade-1 Breeders' Cup Distaff, beating Midnight Bisou.

Blue Prize was sold for $5,000,000 and retired in November 2019. She was bred to Into Mischief.

== Death ==
Blue Prize died on February 15, 2026, at the age of 13.

== Racing statistics ==
Blue Prize's Career Statistics
Date	Age	Distance	Surface	Race	Grade	Track	Odds	Time	Field	Finish	Margin	Jockey	Trainer	Owner	Ref
May 30, 2016	2	1600 meters	Dirt	Especial Juan P. Artiga	Maiden Special Weight	Hipódromo Argentino de Palermo	16.30	1:40.19	12	1	1/2 neck	Fabricio Raul Barroso	Jorge A. Mayansky Neer	La Manija	
Aug 6, 2016	3	1600 meters	Dirt	Gran Premio Gral. Luis Maria Campos	G2	Hipódromo Argentino de Palermo	1.60	1:34.69	8	2	(1/2 length)	Pablro Gustavo Falero	Jorge A. Mayansky Neer	La Manija	
Sep 3, 2016	3	1600 meters	Dirt	Gran Premio Polla de Potrancas	G1	Hipódromo Argentino de Palermo	4.35	1:33.64	9	2	(Neck)	Goncalves F. Fernandes	Jorge A. Mayansky Neer	La Manija	
Oct 10, 2016	3	2000 meters	Dirt	Gran Premio Seleccion - Copa Lalcec	G1	Hipódromo Argentino de Palermo	4.35	2:01.15	7	1	1/2 neck	Goncalves F. Fernandes	Jorge A. Mayansky Neer	La Manija	
Jun 11, 2017	3	1 1/16 miles	Dirt	Allowance	Allowance Optional Claiming	Churchill Downs	3.60	1:44.36	6	2	(1 length)	James Graham	Ignacio Correas, IV	Merriebelle Stable LLC	
Jul 24, 2017	4	1 1/8 miles	Dirt	Allowance	Allowance Optional Claiming	Saratoga Race Course	1.40*	1:53.91	7	2	(4 lengths)	Joel Rosario	Ignacio Correas, IV	Merriebelle Stable LLC	
Aug 20, 2017	4	1 1/8 miles	Dirt	Summer Colony Stakes	Ungraded stakes	Saratoga Race Course	6.60	1:50.53	6	2	(Nose)	James Graham	Ignacio Correas, IV	Merriebelle Stable LLC	
Sep 16, 2017	4	1 1/16 miles	Dirt	Locust Grove Stakes	G3	Churchill Downs	1.50*	1:43.91	7	2	(1 1/4 lengths)	James Graham	Ignacio Correas, IV	Merriebelle Stable LLC	
Oct 8, 2017	4	1 1/8 miles	Dirt	Juddmonte Spinster Stakes	G1	Keeneland	10.70	1:49.70	9	3	(7 1/2 lengths)	James Graham	Ignacio Correas, IV	Merriebelle Stable LLC	
Nov 23, 2017	4	1 1/8 miles	Dirt	Falls City Handicap	G2	Churchill Downs	3.00	1:49.30	6	1	8 1/2 lengths	James Graham	Ignacio Correas, IV	Merriebelle Stable LLC	
Mar 17, 2018	4	1 1/16 miles	Dirt	Azeri Stakes	G2	Churchill Downs	5.10	1:42.95	8	7	(8 1/2 lengths)	James Graham	Ignacio Correas, IV	Merriebelle Stable LLC	
Apr 15, 2018	4	1 1/8 miles	Dirt	Top Flight Invitational Stakes	Listed stakes	Aqueduct Racetrack	1.45	1:51.48	6	1	Neck	José Ortiz	Ignacio Correas, IV	Merriebelle Stable LLC	
May 18, 2018	4	1 1/8 miles	Dirt	Allaire du Pont Distaff Stakes	G3	Pimlico Race Course	1.10*	1:51.10	8	2	(1/2 length)	José Ortiz	Ignacio Correas, IV	Merriebelle Stable LLC	
Jun 16, 2018	4	1 1/8 miles	Dirt	Fleur de Lis Handicap	G2	Churchill Downs	2.30*	1:50.02	9	1	1 1/2 lengths	José Ortiz	Ignacio Correas, IV	Merriebelle Stable LLC	
Sep 15, 2018	5	1 1/16 miles	Dirt	Locust Grove Stakes	G3	Churchill Downs	0.90*	1:43.69	9	1	Nose	Julien Leparoux	Ignacio Correas, IV	Merriebelle Stable LLC	
Oct 7, 2018	5	1 1/8 miles	Dirt	Juddmonte Spinster Stakes	G1	Keeneland	4.50	1:50.02	11	1	3/4 length	Joe Bravo	Ignacio Correas, IV	Merriebelle Stable LLC	
Nov 3, 2018	5	1 1/8 miles	Dirt	Longines Breeders' Cup Distaff	G1	Churchill Downs	8.10	1:49.79	11	4	(1 1/2 lengths)	Joe Bravo	Ignacio Correas, IV	Merriebelle Stable LLC	
May 3, 2019	5	1 1/16 miles	Dirt	La Troienne Stakes presented by Inside Access from Chase	G2	Churchill Downs	2.30*	1:43.58	9	3	(4 1/2 lengths)	Joe Bravo	Ignacio Correas, IV	Merriebelle Stable LLC	
Jun 15, 2019	5	1 1/8 miles	Dirt	Fleur de Lis Handicap	G2	Churchill Downs	3.40	1:50.33	6	2	(1 1/2 lengths)	Javier Castellano	Ignacio Correas, IV	Merriebelle Stable LLC	
Jul 13, 2019	6	1 1/4 miles	Dirt	Delaware Handicap	G2	Delaware Park	3.60	2:02.51	9	3	(4 1/2 lengths)	Joe Bravo	Ignacio Correas, IV	Merriebelle Stable LLC	
Aug 18, 2019	6	1 1/8 miles	Dirt	Summer Colony Stakes	Listed stakes	Saratoga Race Course	0.60*	1:48.58	7	1	Neck	José Ortiz	Ignacio Correas, IV	Merriebelle Stable LLC	
Oct 6, 2019	6	1 1/8 miles	Dirt	Juddmonte Spinster Stakes	G1	Keeneland	7.60	1:50.30	5	1	(1/2 length)	Joe Bravo	Ignacio Correas, IV	Merriebelle Stable LLC	
Nov 2, 2019	6	1 1/8 miles	Dirt	Longines Breeders' Cup Distaff	G1	Santa Anita Park	8.90	1:50.50	11	1	1 1/2 lengths	Joe Bravo	Ignacio Correas, IV	Merriebelle Stable LLC	

An asterisk after the odds means Blue Prize was the post time favorite

== Pedigree ==
Pedigree of Blue Prize (ARG), 2013
Sire Pure Prize (USA) 1998	Storm Cat (USA); 1983	Storm Bird	Northern Dancer
Sire Pure Prize (USA) 1998	Storm Cat (USA); 1983	Storm Bird	South Ocean
Sire Pure Prize (USA) 1998	Storm Cat (USA); 1983	Terlingua	Secretariat
Sire Pure Prize (USA) 1998	Storm Cat (USA); 1983	Terlingua	Crimson Saint
Sire Pure Prize (USA) 1998	Heavenly Prize (USA); 1991	Seeking The Gold	Mr. Prospector
Sire Pure Prize (USA) 1998	Heavenly Prize (USA); 1991	Seeking The Gold	Con Game
Sire Pure Prize (USA) 1998	Heavenly Prize (USA); 1991	Oh What A Dance	Nijinsky
Sire Pure Prize (USA) 1998	Heavenly Prize (USA); 1991	Oh What A Dance	Blitey
Dam Blues For Sale (ARG) 2003	Not For Sale (ARG); 1994	Parade Marshal	Caro
Dam Blues For Sale (ARG) 2003	Not For Sale (ARG); 1994	Parade Marshal	Stepping High
Dam Blues For Sale (ARG) 2003	Not For Sale (ARG); 1994	Love For Sale	Laramie Trail
Dam Blues For Sale (ARG) 2003	Not For Sale (ARG); 1994	Love For Sale	Museliere
Dam Blues For Sale (ARG) 2003	Key Cure (USA); 1996	Cure The Blues	Stop The Music
Dam Blues For Sale (ARG) 2003	Key Cure (USA); 1996	Cure The Blues	Quick Cure
Dam Blues For Sale (ARG) 2003	Key Cure (USA); 1996	Dancers Key	Key to the Mint
Dam Blues For Sale (ARG) 2003	Key Cure (USA); 1996	Dancers Key	Dancers Saga
