= José A. Santos =

Chilian jockey

Jose Santos
Personal information
- Born: April 26, 1961 (age 65) Concepción, Bío-Bío Region, Chile
- Occupation: Jockey

Horse racing career
- Sport: Horse racing
- Career wins: 4,083 (North America)

Major racing wins
- Lawrence Realization Stakes (1985, 2000); Morven Stakes (1985); Lexington Stakes (1986, 2004); Mother Goose Stakes (1986); Hill Prince Stakes (1986, 1987, 1996); Vagrancy Handicap (1986, 1992); Vosburgh Stakes (1986); Turf Classic Invitational Handicap (1986, 1989); United Nations Handicap (1986, 1988, 1990, 1993); Bertram F. Bongard Stakes (1987, 1997, 2002); Florida Derby (1987, 1991); Flower Bowl Invitational Stakes (1987, 2005); Kentucky Oaks (1987); Remsen Stakes (1987); Wood Memorial Stakes (1987); Black Helen Handicap (1988, 1992); Brooklyn Handicap (1988); Carter Handicap (1988, 1992, 2006); Hawthorne Gold Cup Handicap (1988, 1989); Jockey Club Gold Cup (1988, 1994, 2004); Laurel Futurity (1988); Metropolitan Handicap (1988, 1990); Personal Ensign Handicap (1988, 2003); San Fernando Stakes (1988); Arlington Million (1989, 1993); Garden City Breeders' Cup Handicap (1989, 1990, 1991, 2004); Futurity Stakes (1989, 1994); Ladies Handicap (1989, 1990); Man O' War Stakes (1989, 1993); Royal Palm Handicap (1989, 1994); Shadwell Turf Mile Stakes (1989); Champagne Stakes (1990); Dwyer Stakes (1990); Frizette Stakes (1990); Hollywood Gold Cup (1990); Matron Stakes (1990, 1993); Pimlico Special (1990); Jerome Handicap (1991, 2003); Strub Stakes (1991); Violet Handicap (1991); Manhattan Handicap (1993, 1998); Coaching Club American Oaks (1994, 1995); Saratoga Special Stakes (1994, 1995, 2000); Withers Stakes (1994, 1995, 2002); Maker's Mark Mile Stakes (1995); Tremont Stakes (1995, 2000); Tropical Park Oaks (1997); Jenny Wiley Stakes (1998); Travers Stakes (1999); Hopeful Stakes (2000); Bahamas Stakes (2001); Fall Highweight Handicap (2001); Gallant Bloom Handicap (2002); Maid of the Mist Stakes (2002); Gazelle Handicap (2002); Sunshine Millions Filly & Mare Turf (2003); Belmont Lexington Stakes (2004); Beldame Stakes (2006); Monmouth Breeders' Cup Oaks (2006) American Classics wins: Kentucky Derby (2003); Preakness Stakes (2003); Belmont Stakes (1999) Breeders' Cup wins Breeders' Cup Turf (1986, 1997); Breeders' Cup Juvenile (1987, 1990); Breeders' Cup Mile (1989); Breeders' Cup Juvenile Fillies (1990); Breeders' Cup Classic (2002) International race wins: Canadian International Stakes (1986, 1997); King Edward Stakes (1997)

Racing awards
- United States Champion Jockey by earnings (1986, 1987, 1988, 1989); Eclipse Award for Outstanding Jockey (1988); George Woolf Memorial Jockey Award (1999); ESPY for Outstanding U.S. Jockey (2003); Red Smith "Good Guy" Award (2003)

Honours
- United States' Racing Hall of Fame (2007)

Significant horses
- Manila, Cryptoclearance, Chief Bearhart, Gulch; Fly So Free, Meadow Star, Success Express; Criminal Type, Colonial Affair, Steinlen; Lemon Drop Kid, Funny Cide, Fleet Indian, Volponi
- Updated on July 31, 2007

José Adeón Santos León (born April 26, 1961, in Concepción, Chile) is a retired Chilean thoroughbred jockey who has been honored by the National Museum of Racing and Hall of Fame in the United States.

== Career ==
Jose Santos first raced horses at the Club Hípico de Concepción in his native Chile, following in the footsteps of his father and three of his seven brothers, and in Colombia before moving to the United States in 1984. There he was the top money-winning jockey four years in a row, from 1986 through 1989, winning the 1988 Eclipse Award for Outstanding Jockey in the United States; Santos was at the top of the sport during those years. He won seven Breeders' Cup races and won the 1999 Belmont Stakes aboard Lemon Drop Kid. He won the 2003 Kentucky Derby and Preakness Stakes with Funny Cide but missed winning the Triple Crown of Thoroughbred Racing after finishing third in the Belmont Stakes. More recently, Santos has said that Funny Cide was not the greatest horse he ever rode but certainly was his personal favorite.

In 1999, Santos had won the George Woolf Memorial Jockey Award. Santos also won the 2003 ESPY Awards as the foremost jockey in the United States.

Santos and his first wife, Maria, who was from Roslyn Heights, were divorced in 1994; they had two children during the marriage. Daughter Sophia Santos was graduated from Roslyn High School in 2005, then briefly attended the Fashion Institute of Technology. Son Jose Ricardo Santos was a graduated from the same high school in 2007 and now serves in the United States Marine Corps.

In 2011 Jose Santos' biography, Above It All: The Turbulent Life of Jose Santos, was authored by award-winning author Bill Heller.

== Libel lawsuit ==
In 2004, José Santos and Sackatoga Stable, owners of thoroughbred Funny Cide, filed a $48 million libel suit against The Miami Herald because of a story by freelance writer Frank Carlson and a photograph that appeared in its issue for May 10, 2003, seven days after Santos won the Kentucky Derby.

The photograph, with accompanying comments, was posted highlighting what appeared to be a metallic object in Santos's right hand as he and Funny Cide crossed the finish line. Due to the angle from which the photograph was taken, it appeared that Santos was holding an object in his right hand, and so raised suspicion that he had cheated to win the world-famous race. Subsequent developments furthered the suspicion. When asked about what the photo appeared to show, Santos thought the reporter was asking about an object around his wrist and was quoted as identifying the object as a "cue ring", triggering an investigation.

The Chilean-born jockey, whose only English is heavily accented, tried later to explain that he had called the object around his wrist a "Q ray," which is a magnetic bracelet worn by athletes to ease joint pain.

Santos hired attorney David Travis to defend him before the Kentucky Racing Commission. Experts were called in to examine the initial photograph and numerous others (showing the same scene but shot from different angles). At the conclusion of the investigation, Santos was cleared of all charges. The results of the investigation showed that in reality Santos did not have an object in his hand and it was the angle of the photograph that only made it appear otherwise. Other photographs and angles showed absolutely nothing in Santos's hand and revealed that it would have been virtually impossible for him to be holding anything.

The $48 million libel suit against The Miami Herald was settled in 2008. Santos's Palm Beach attorney, litigator Bruce S. Rogow, told reporters his client was "pleased" with the confidential terms.

== Advertising controversy ==
José Santos was also one of the first of five top jockeys (the others were Jerry Bailey, John Velazquez, Gary Stevens, and Shane Sellers) to wear advertising patches in the Kentucky Derby, starting in 2004. They sued, with an argument grounded in the First Amendment to the United States Constitution, to be allowed to wear such patches during the race. The ruling was issued on April 21, 2004, by U.S. District Judge John Heyburn in Louisville.

The jockeys in question had been offered substantial endorsement contracts to wear the ad patches, with payments, in some cases, of $30,000 apiece. Wearing this advertising was legal in the other Triple Crown states, New York and Maryland, but the Kentucky Horse Racing Authority had maintained that such advertising violated racing tradition and might lead to corruption.

== Retirement ==
On February 1, 2007, Santos, then 45 years old, was involved in a three-horse racing accident at Aqueduct Racetrack in New York. He suffered five broken vertebrae, a broken sternum, and several broken ribs.

Santos initially planned to return to riding by late 2007. However, he did not fully recover from his spinal injuries. Advised by his doctors that it would be far too dangerous for him to return to riding and that he would likely end up paralyzed should he have another accident, Santos, along with his current wife, Rita, and the support of his children, decided to retire.

One week before his induction into the National Museum of Racing and Hall of Fame, Santos announced his retirement in several press conferences at the Saratoga Race Course. The first was held in the press box at the racecourse. With his usual smile, though later showing other emotion, Santos informed the press that he would retire. He received a standing ovation from all in attendance, with most members of the press waiting to personally shake his hand and wish him well. Another press conference was held in the jockey's room and was televised on the Saratoga Race Course television station. With all of his fellow jockeys in attendance, it was an emotional scene not only Santos but for many other jockeys. Here as well, Santos received a touching standing ovation from his peers and friends of many years. Almost every jockey in attendance, many from all over the United States, waited until the end to greet Santos, some with a handshake and even more with an embracing hug.

A much moved José Santos said:

I am extremely grateful for the career I've had, for the owners and trainers that had faith in me, to my fellow jockeys who helped bring out the best in me and to the fans for their support," Santos said. "Most of all, I am grateful to my family. They have always supported me, and it is tough because every time you ride a horse, you are in danger. They don't have to worry anymore, and that is a relief.

One week later, when Santos was formally inducted into the Hall of Fame, he received an unprecedented three standing ovations from the crowd. It was one of the best attended Hall of Fame ceremonies in years. Family and friends accompanied Santos to the induction ceremonies at Saratoga, including his second wife, Rita, from whom he is currently separated, and his two eldest children, José Ricardo and Sophia, from his first marriage to Maria.

Lifetime statistics: 25,928 mounts, 4,083 wins, and earnings of $188,561,787, ranking him eleventh in the all-time jockey rankings.

=== Year-end charts ===
Chart (2000–2006)	Peak position
National Earnings List for Jockeys 2000	41
National Earnings List for Jockeys 2001	62
National Earnings List for Jockeys 2002	9
National Earnings List for Jockeys 2003	7
National Earnings List for Jockeys 2004	23
National Earnings List for Jockeys 2005	20
National Earnings List for Jockeys 2006	34

== Triple Crown Race Record ==
Year	Kentucky Derby	Finish	Preakness	Finish	Belmont	Finish
1986	-	-	-	-	Mogambo	6th
1987	Cryptoclearance	4th	Cryptoclearance	7th	-	-
1987	-	-	-	-	Leo Castelli	9th
1989	Triple Buck	9th	-	-	Triple Buck	9th
1990	-	-	-	-	Video Ranger	7th
1992	-	-	-	-	Montreal Marty	8th
1991	Fly So Free	5th	-	-	-	-
1993	Kissin Kris	7th	-	-	Kissin Kris	2nd
1994	-	-	-	-	Signal Tap	4th
1995	-	-	-	-	Colonel Secretary	9th
1996	Victory Speech	10th	-	-	-	-
1996	-	-	-	-	Skip Away	2nd
1997	-	-	Hoxie	7th	-	-
1999	Lemon Drop Kid	9th	-	-	Lemon Drop Kid	1st
2002	-	-	-	-	Artax Too	11th
2003	Funny Cide	1st	Funny Cide	1st	Funny Cide	3rd
2004	Limehouse	4th	-	-	-	-
2004	-	-	-	-	Master David	7th
2005	-	-	Hal's Image	11th	-	-
2005	-	-	-	-	Reverberate	10th

Kentucky Derby: 8-1-0-0

Preakness: 4-1-0-0

Belmont: 14-1-2-1
