= Personal Ensign Stakes =

- Class: Grade I
- Location: Saratoga Race Course; Saratoga Springs, New York, United States
- Inaugurated: 1948
- Race type: Thoroughbred – Flat racing
- Website: www.nyra.com/saratoga/racing/stakes-schedule/personal-ensign/

Race information
- Distance: 1 1/8 miles
- Surface: Dirt
- Track: left-handed
- Qualification: Fillies & Mares, three-years-old & up
- Weight: Allowances
- Purse: US$500,000 (since 2025)

The Personal Ensign Stakes is an American Grade I Thoroughbred horse race held annually during the third week of August at Saratoga Race Course in Saratoga Springs, New York. Open to fillies and Mares age three and older, it is contested at a distance of one and one-eighth miles on dirt.

Since 1997, this race has been named for U.S. Racing Hall of Fame filly, Personal Ensign. Undefeated in racing, Personal Ensign was also a great broodmare. Her granddaughter Storm Flag Flying won the race in 2004.

Inaugurated at Jamaica Race Course in 1948 as the Firenze Handicap, it was named for the U.S. Racing Hall of Fame filly, Firenze. From 1986 through 1996 it was run as the John A. Morris Handicap, named to honor John Albert Morris, a prominent horseman who in 1889 built the Morris Park Racecourse in The Bronx, New York.

Since inception, the race has also been hosted by all three tracks operated by the New York Racing Association:

- Jamaica Race Course: 1948–1957
- Aqueduct Racetrack: 1960–1974, 1976–1985
- Belmont Park: 1975
- Saratoga Race Course: 1958–1959, 1986–present

The race has been contested at various distances:

- 1 1/16 miles: 1948–1950
- 1 mile: 1960–1961
- 1 3/8 miles: 1975
- 1 1/8 miles: 1976–1994, 2012–present
- 1 1/4 miles: 1995–2011

The Firenze Handicap was run on turf from 1972 to 1975 and run in two divisions in 1972 and 1974. The 1988 race was run for purse money only, no wagering, after being postponed for one day due to severe thunderstorms that forced cancellation of the remainder of the racing card at Saratoga Springs on Aug. 28, 1988.

== Records ==
Speed record:

- 2:02.07 – Shadow Cast (2005) (at the distance of 1 1/4 miles)
- 1:47.19 – Abel Tasman (2018) (at the current distance of 1 1/8 miles)

Most wins:

- 2 – Lie Low (1974, 1975)
- 2 – Politely (1967, 1968)
- 2 – Beautiful Pleasure (1999, 2000)

Most wins by a jockey:

- 8 – Ángel Cordero Jr. (1968, 1972 (2), 1976, 1983, 1985, 1987, 1989)

Most wins by a trainer:

- 4 – C. R. McGaughey III (1990, 1995, 2004, 2010)
- 4 – MacKenzie Miller (1959, 1974, 1975, 1993)

Most wins by an owner:

- 3 – Rokeby Stable (1956, 1969, 1993)
- 3 – Ogden Phipps (1980, 1990, 1995) (other members of the Phipps family also won in 1976, 2004 and 2010)

== Winners ==
Year	Winner	Age	Jockey	Trainer	Owner	Time
2026	Fully Subscribed	4	Flavien Prat	Chad C. Brown	Klaravich Stables	1:49.23
2025	Thorpedo Anna	4	Brian Hernandez Jr.	Kenneth G. McPeek	Hill 'n' Dale Equine Holdings, Magdalena Racing, Mark Edwards & Judy B. Hicks	1:49.18
2024	Raging Sea	4	Flavien Prat	Chad C. Brown	Alpha Delta Stables	1:49.14
2023	Idiomatic	4	Florent Geroux	Brad H. Cox	Juddmonte	1:49.12
2022	Malathaat	4	John Velazquez	Todd A. Pletcher	Shadwell Racing	1:48.30
2021	Letruska	5	Irad Ortiz Jr.	Fausto Gutierrez	St. George Stable	1:49.15
2020	Vexatious	6	Jose Lezcano	Jack Sisterson	James C. Weigel & Giant's Causeway Syndicate, LLC	1:48.82
2019	Midnight Bisou	4	Mike E. Smith	Steve Asmussen	Bloom Racing Stable, LLC, Madaket Stables LLC and Allen Racing LLC.	1:47.92
2018	Abel Tasman	4	Mike E. Smith	Bob Baffert	China Horse Club International Ltd. and Clearsky Farms	1:47.19
2017	Forever Unbridled	5	Joel Rosario	Dallas Stewart	Charles E. Fipke	1:49.16
2016	Cavorting	4	Javier Castellano	Kiaran McLaughlin	Stonestreet Stables	1:48.61
2015	Sheer Drama	5	Joe Bravo	David Fawkes	Harold L. Queen	1:49.05
2014	Close Hatches	4	Joel Rosario	William I. Mott	Juddmonte Farms	1:50.62
2013	Royal Delta	5	Mike E. Smith	William I. Mott	Besilu Stables	1:48.34
2012	Love and Pride	4	John Velazquez	Todd A. Pletcher	Green Hills Farm	1:49.22
2011	Ask the Moon	6	Javier Castellano	Marty Wolfson	Farnsworth Stables	2:04.21
2010	Persistently	4	Alan Garcia	C. R. McGaughey III	Phipps Stable	2:04.49
2009	Icon Project	4	Julien Leparoux	Martin D. Wolfson	Andrew Rosen	2:02.37
2008	Ginger Punch	5	Rafael Bejarano	Robert J. Frankel	Stronach Stables	2:03.37
2007	Miss Shop	4	Javier Castellano	H. Allen Jerkens	Hobeau Farm	2:03.48
2006	Fleet Indian	5	José A. Santos	Todd A. Pletcher	Paul Saylor	2:03.87
2005	Shadow Cast	4	Robby Albarado	Neil J. Howard	William S. Farish IV	2:02.07
2004	Storm Flag Flying	4	John Velazquez	C. R. McGaughey III	Ogden Mills Phipps et al.	2:03.63
2003	Passing Shot	4	José A. Santos	H. Allen Jerkens	Joseph V. Shields Jr.	2:03.33
2002	Summer Colony	4	John Velazquez	Mark A. Hennig	Edward P. Evans	2:03.15
2001	Pompeii	4	Richard Migliore	John C. Kimmel	WinStar Farm, LLC.	2:04.60
2000	Beautiful Pleasure	5	Jorge Chavez	John T. Ward Jr.	John C. Oxley	2:03.77
1999	Beautiful Pleasure	4	Jorge Chavez	John T. Ward Jr.	John C. Oxley	2:02.57
1998	Tomisue's Delight	4	Pat Day	Neil J. Howard	Stephen C. Hilbert	2:04.08
1997	Clear Mandate	5	Mike E. Smith	George R. Arnold II	G. Watts Humphrey Jr.	2:03.71
1996	Urbane	4	Alex Solis	Randy Bradshaw	Siegel Family	2:03.05
1995	Heavenly Prize	4	Pat Day	C. R. McGaughey III	Ogden Phipps	2:04.16
1994	Link River	4	Julie Krone	William I Mott	Sheikh Mohammed	1:50.46
1993	You'd Be Surprised	4	Jerry Bailey	MacKenzie Miller	Rokeby Stable	1:48.59
1992	Quick Mischief	6	Craig Perret	Charles Carlesimo Jr.	Greg G. Mordas	1:47.96
1991	Fit to Scout	4	Chris Antley	Jack C. Van Berg	Robert M. Snell	1:50.20
1990	Personal Business	4	Chris Antley	C. R. McGaughey III	Ogden Phipps	1:51.20
1989	Colonial Waters	4	Ángel Cordero Jr.	Ross Pearce	Buckland Farm	1:50.00
1988	Rose's Cantina	4	José A. Santos	LeRoy Jolley	Carl Icahn	1:49.80
1987	Coup De Fusil	5	Ángel Cordero Jr.	Jan H. Nerud	Tartan Stable	1:49.20
1986	Shocker T.	4	Gene St. Leon	George Gianos	Thomasina Caporella	1:50.00
1985	Lady On The Run	3	Ángel Cordero Jr.	Bruce N. Levine	Peter Montemarano	1:52.00
1984	Solar Halo	3	Robbie Davis	J. Elliott Burch	James F. Edwards	1:49.20
1983	Chieftain's Command	4	Ángel Cordero Jr.	John Parisella	Theodore Sabarese	1:51.60
1982	Number	3	Eddie Maple	Woody Stephens	Claiborne Farm	1:51.40
1981	Tina Tina Too	3	Don MacBeth	Richard T. DeStasio	Albert Fried Jr.	1:51.00
1980	Relaxing	4	Jorge Velásquez	Angel Penna Sr.	Ogden Phipps	1:49.20
1979	Catherine's Bet	4	Daryl Montoya	James P. Conway	Adele L. Rand	1:50.20
1978	Mrs. Warren	4	Jorge Velásquez	Woody Stephens	Newstead Farm	1:51.40
1977	Water Malone	3	Jean-Luc Samyn	Philip G. Johnson	Mrs. Morton Rosenthal	1:50.40
1976	Sugar Plum Time	4	Ángel Cordero Jr.	John W. Russell	Cynthia Phipps	1:51.00
1975	Lie Low	4	Jorge Velásquez	MacKenzie Miller	Cragwood Stables	2:15.20
1974†	Lie Low	3	Jorge Velásquez	MacKenzie Miller	Cragwood Stables	1:49.00
1974†	Twixt	5	William J. Passmore	Katharine Voss	Mrs. John M. Franklin	1:49.80
1973	Aglimmer	4	Michael Venezia	Willard C. Freeman	John A. Bell III	1:49.40
1972†	Manta	6	Ángel Cordero Jr.	Victor J. Nickerson	Elmendorf Farm	1:50.00
1972†	Aladancer	4	Ángel Cordero Jr.	Stephen A. DiMauro	Albert Clay	1:50.80
1971	Kittiwake	3	Heliodoro Gustines	Woody Stephens	Mrs. Taylor Hardin	1:50.20
1970	Obeah	5	John L. Rotz	Henry S. Clark	Christiana Stable	1:51.20
1969	Amerigo Lady	5	Jorge Velásquez	J. Elliott Burch	Rokeby Stable	1:50.00
1968	Politely	5	Ángel Cordero Jr.	George M. Baker	Bohemia Stable	1:49.60
1967	Politely	4	Braulio Baeza	George M. Baker	Bohemia Stable	1:53.00
1966	Straight Deal II	4	Bobby Ussery	Hirsch Jacobs	Ethel D. Jacobs	1:49.60
1965	Sailor Princess	3	Gary Mineau	Burley Parke	Harbor View Farm	1:51.20
1964	Steeple Jill	3	John Ruane	Sylvester Veitch	George D. Widener Jr.	1:51.80
1963	Lamb Chop	3	Manuel Ycaza	James W. Maloney	William Haggin Perry	1:49.80
1962	Pocosaba	5	William Boland	H. Allen Jerkens	George H. Bostwick	1:52.00
1961	Oil Royalty	3	Hedley Woodhouse	Edward A. Neloy	Elmendorf Farm	1:36.60
1960	Clear Road	3	Raymond York	Pete Mosconi	Edward Seinfeld	1:36.40
1959	Polamby	4	Pete Anderson	MacKenzie Miller	Ned W. Brent	1:50.80
1958	Hoosier Honey	4	John Ruane	Not found	Roy R. Hunt	1:45.40
1957	Gay Life	4	John Ruane	Not found	Morty Freedman	1:50.40
1956	Blue Banner	4	William Boland	Jack Skinner	Rokeby Stable	1:49.40
1955	Rare Treat	3	Ray Mikkonen	Bert Mulholland	George D. Widener Jr.	1:50.80
1954	Parlo	3	Ted Atkinson	Richard E. Handlen	Foxcatcher Farm	1:53.40
1953	Kiss Me Kate	5	Dave Gorman	Oscar White	Walter M. Jeffords	1:50.80
1952	Next Move	5	Eric Guerin	William C. Winfrey	Alfred G. Vanderbilt II	1:51.20
1951	Renew	4	B. Green	Max Hirsch	King Ranch	1:50.60
1950	Red Camelia	4	Patterson Milligan	John B. Theall	Joe W. Brown	1:45.40
1949	But Why Not	5	Dave Gorman	Max Hirsch	King Ranch	1:44.80
1948	Carolyn A.	4	Charles LeBlanc	James P. Conway	Florence Whitaker	1:46.80

† The race was run in two divisions in 1972 and 1974.
