= Club Hípico de Concepción =

Horse racing venue in Hualpen, Chile

- Interactive map of Club Hípico de Concepción
- Location: Hualpen, Chile
- Coordinates: 36.7853°S 73.0911°E
- Date opened: 1918
- Race type: Thoroughbred

Club Hipico de Concepcion, also called the Mediocamino, is a thoroughbred race track in Hualpen near Concepcion in the Biobío Region of Chile. The track was opened in 1918. It features a right-handed nine-furlong dirt track. Currently, no major races are run at the Mediocamino.

Four-time American Champion jockey José A. Santos, a native of Concepcion, started his career at the track.
