= Houston Ladies Classic Stakes =

- Class: Grade III
- Location: Sam Houston Race Park; Houston, Texas, United States
- Inaugurated: 2013
- Race type: Thoroughbred – flat racing
- Website: Sam Houston Race Park

Race information
- Distance: 1 1/16 miles
- Surface: Dirt
- Track: left-handed
- Qualification: Fillies and mares, four-years-old and older
- Weight: 123 lbs with allowances
- Purse: $300,000 (since 2023)

The Houston Ladies Classic Stakes is a Grade III American thoroughbred horse race for fillies and mares age four and older over a distance of one and aon-sixteenth miles on the dirt track held annually in late January at Sam Houston Race Park in Houston, Texas. The event currently carries a purse of $300,000.

== History ==
The inaugural running of the event was on 26 January 2013 and was won by Fox Hill Farms' 3/2 favorite Canadian-bred Joyful Victory who was ridden by Rosie Napravnik and trained by J. Larry Jones by 4 1/4 lengths in a time of 1:42.30 setting a new track record for the 1 1/16 miles distance breaking the former record set by Desert Air on 13 February 1999 of 1:42.79. The inaugural event was the richest Thoroughbred event on the program and in Texas which featured four stakes races worth $725,000. Later in the year Joyful Victory was retired by her owners and was sold in the November in the Fasig-Tipton select sale for US$2 million to Aaron & Marie Jones.

With the quality mares that were entering the event it was not long before the American Graded Stakes Committee gave the race a graded status of Grade III for the fourth running in 2016. The 2016 winner Forever Unbridled later in year won two Grade I events and ran third in the Breeders' Cup Distaff at Santa Anita Park as a 15/1 longshot to Beholder. The following year Forever Unbridled was undefeated and did win the Breeders' Cup Distaff.

After finishing third in the 2018 Breeders' Cup Distaff at Churchill Downs, Midnight Bisou began her 2019 four-year-old career in the Houston Ladies Classic. Starting as the 2/5 odds-on favorite, Midnight Bisou closed fast in late stretch to be win in the final strides. Midnight Bisou would win six more graded events and finish second in the Breeders' Cup Distaff at Santa Anita Park. Her performance during the year was enough to earn her US Champion Older Dirt Female Horse honors.

The event is one of only two graded stakes races held at the track along with the Grade III John B. Connally Turf Cup. Along with the Pulse Power Turf Sprint and Bob Bork Texas Turf Mile, the Houston Ladies Classic Stakes is one of the main events of the Houston Racing Festival.

== Records ==
Speed record:

- 1 1/16 miles: 1:42.30 – Joyful Victory (2013) (New Track Record)

Margins:

- 4 1/4 lengths – Joyful Victory (2013)

Most wins:

- 2 – Pauline's Pearl (2022, 2023)

Most wins by a jockey:

- 2 – Joel Rosario (2016, 2022)
- 2 – Stewart Elliott (2023, 2024)

Most wins by a trainer:

- 7 – Steven M. Asmussen (2019, 2020, 2022, 2023, 2024, 2025, 2026)

Most wins by an owner:

- 2 – Fox Hill Farm (2013, 2015)
- 2 – Stonestreet Stables (2022, 2023)

== Winners ==
Year	Winner	Age	Jockey	Trainer	Owner	Distance	Time	Purse	Grade	Ref
2026	Perfect Shot	5	Erik Asmussen	Steven M. Asmussen	Whisper Hill Farm	1 1/16 miles	1:46.09	$300,000	III	
2025	Recharge	4	Ben Curtis	Steven M. Asmussen	Winchell Thoroughbreds	1 1/16 miles	1:45.53	$300,000	III	
2024	Bellamore	6	Stewart Elliott	Steven M. Asmussen	Kaleem Shah	1 1/16 miles	1:46.24	$300,000	III	
2023	Pauline's Pearl	5	Stewart Elliott	Steven M. Asmussen	Stonestreet Stables	1 1/16 miles	1:45.69	$300,000	III	
2022	Pauline's Pearl	4	Joel Rosario	Steven M. Asmussen	Stonestreet Stables	1 1/16 miles	1:44.43	$400,000	III	
2021	Letruska	5	Jesus Lopez Castanon	Fausto Gutierrez	St. George Stable	1 1/16 miles	1:45.02	$300,000	III	
2020	Lady Apple	4	Ricardo Santana Jr.	Steven M. Asmussen	Phoenix Thoroughbred III & KatieRich Stables	1 1/16 miles	1:44.19	$300,000	III	
2019	Midnight Bisou	4	Mike E. Smith	Steven M. Asmussen	Bloom Racing Stable, Madaket Stables & Allen Racing	1 1/16 miles	1:44.52	$300,000	III	
2018	Tiger Moth	6	Florent Geroux	Brad H. Cox	John D. Gunther	1 1/16 miles	1:46.01	$400,000	III	
2017	Unbridled Mo	4	Jose L. Ortiz	Todd A. Pletcher	Red Oak Stable	1 1/16 miles	1:42.89	$400,000	III	
2016	Forever Unbridled	4	Joel Rosario	Dallas Stewart	Charles Fipke	1 1/16 miles	1:43.74	$400,000	III	
2015	Cassatt	4	Kerwin D. Clark	J. Larry Jones	Fox Hill Farm	1 1/16 miles	1:44.96	$400,000	Listed	
2014	Rose to Gold	4	Jesus M. Rios	Sal Santoro	Kathleen Amaya	1 1/16 miles	1:43.87	$400,000	Listed	
2013	Joyful Victory (CAN)	5	Rosie Napravnik	J. Larry Jones	Fox Hill Farm	1 1/16 miles	1:42.30	$400,000		

== See also ==
- List of American and Canadian Graded races
