= Tropical Park Oaks =

The Tropical Park Oaks is an American Thoroughbred horse race in Florida formerly run on New Year's Day. Formerly run at Calder Race Course in Miami Gardens, Florida, the event moved to Gulfstream Park after Calder closed in 2020. The one and one sixteenth mile ungraded stakes turf event for 3-year-old fillies offers a purse of $125,000 added.

The race is named for the old Tropical Park Race Track.

== Past winners ==
- 1995 – Rose Law Firm (Mike E. Smith)
- 1996 – Lulu's Ransom (Herb McCauley)
- 1997 – Reach the Top (José A. Santos)
- 1998 – To Be Approved (Eibar Coa)
- 1999 – Bal d'Argent
- 2000 – Solvig (Pat Day)
- 2001 - Voodoo Dancer (Rene Douglas)
- 2002 – Stormy Frolic (Jerry Bailey)
- 2003 – Sweettrickydancer (Eibar Coa)
- 2004 – Bobbi Use (Eibar Coa)
- 2005 – Dansetta Light (John Velazquez)
- 2006 – J'ray
- 2007 - Christmas Kid (Kent Desormeaux)
- 2008 – Bsharpsonata (Eric Camacho)
- 2009 – Race cancelled
- 2022 – Golden Glider
- 2023 – Be My Sunshine
