= Midnight Bisou =

American thoroughbred racehorse

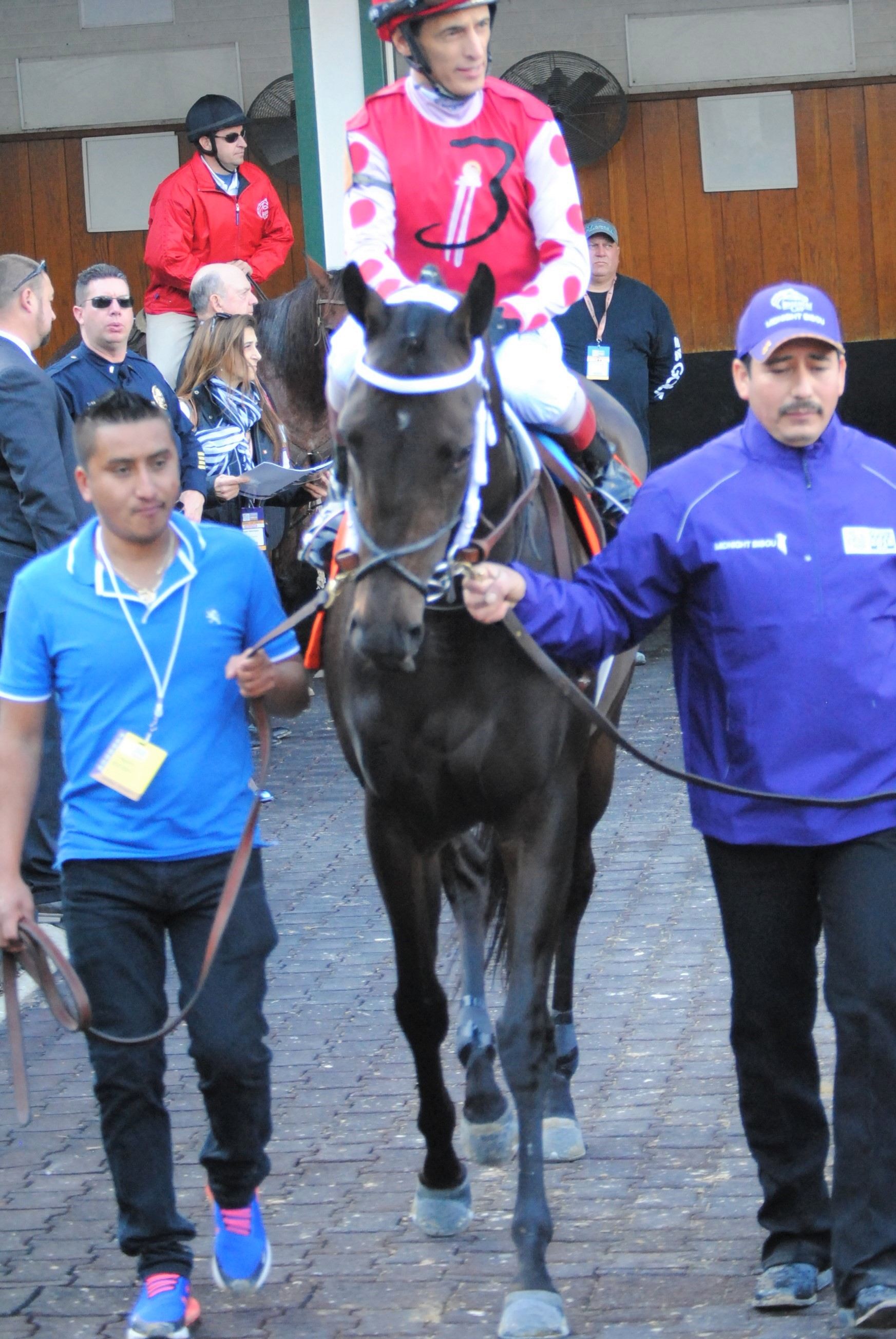
- Breed: Thoroughbred
- Sire: Midnight Lute
- Grandsire: Real Quiet
- Dam: Diva Delite
- Damsire: Repent
- Sex: Mare
- Foaled: April 18, 2015
- Country: USA
- Color: dark bay
- Breeder: Woodford Thoroughbreds
- Owner: Allen Racing & Bloom Racing Stable (2017 - June 2018); Bloom Racing Stable, Madaket Stables, Allen Racing
- Trainer: William Spawr (2017 - June 2018); Steven M. Asmussen
- Record: 22 : 14 - 5 - 3
- Earnings: $13,971,520

Major wins
- Saudi Cup (2020); Santa Ynez Stakes (2018); Santa Ysabel Stakes (2018); Santa Anita Oaks (2018); Mother Goose Stakes (2018); Cotillion Stakes (2018); Houston Ladies Classic (2019); Azeri Stakes (2019); Apple Blossom Handicap (2019); Ogden Phipps Handicap (2019); Molly Pitcher Stakes (2019); Personal Ensign Stakes (2019); Beldame Stakes(2019); Fleur de Lis Stakes (2020)

Awards
- American Champion Older Dirt Female Horse (2019)
- Last updated on 29 June 2020

Midnight Bisou (foaled April 18, 2015) is a retired American Thoroughbred racehorse who was the Champion Older Female Horse of 2019 after being one of the top-ranked fillies of 2018. At age three, she won five stakes races including the Santa Anita Oaks, Mother Goose and Cotillion Stakes. She was also third in both the Kentucky Oaks and Breeders' Cup Distaff. In 2019 at age four, she won seven straight stakes races including the Grade I Apple Blossom, Ogden Phipps, and Personal Ensign.

== Background ==
Midnight Bisou is a dark bay filly who was bred in Kentucky by Woodford Thoroughbreds. She was sired by champion sprinter Midnight Lute, a son of Kentucky Derby winner Real Quiet. Her dam, Diva Delite, is a graded-stakes winning daughter of Repent.

Midnight Bisou was offered for sale at the 2016 Keeneland Yearling Sales but did not meet her reserve on a final bid of $19,000. She was later sold as a two-year-old in training at the 2017 Ocala Breeders' Sale for $80,000 to Bloom Racing Stable and Allen Racing. Madaket Stable subsequently purchased a share. She was originally trained by Will Spawr before being moved in July 2018 to the stable of Hall of Famer Steve Asmussen.

== Racing career ==
Midnight Bisou's first start was a six-furlong maiden race on October 27, 2017, at Santa Anita Park, where she went off at odds of 21–1 in a field of 11. She stalked the early pace, then maneuvered between horses on the turn to move into contention. In the stretch, she started to make up ground steadily but was beaten by a nose by Dream Tree.

Spawr then stepped the filly up in class by entering her in the Desi Arnaz Stakes at Del Mar on November 18. She was bumped at the start, then rallied late to finish second, again nosed out by Dream Tree.

=== 2018: three-year-old campaign ===
Midnight Bisou made nine starts at age three, all of them stakes races. She won five times, including the Grade I Santa Anita Oaks and Cotillion Stakes, with one second-place finish and three thirds.

On January 7, 2018, she entered the Santa Ynez Stakes as the 2-1 second choice in a field of eight. Ridden for the first time by Mike Smith, she stalked the early pace but lost a bit of position while racing four wide around the far turn. Once in the stretch, she regained her momentum and drew clear to win by 4 1/2 lengths. "Big win, no question," said Spawr. "Mike's never ridden her and he said she surprised him a little around the turn. He said she kinda dropped the bridle, so he gathered her up to get her running and she took off. She wants to route, no question. Being around her, the way she acts, her temperament, she’ll relish a route."

She was the heavy favorite in the Santa Ysabel Stakes, her first two-turn race at a distance of 1 1/16 miles and run over a sloppy track. She settled a few lengths behind the early pace set by Spring Lily, then started her move on the final turn while racing three wide. She took the lead in mid-stretch and continued to draw away to win by 3 1/2 lengths. "It was nice to see her relax," said co-owner Jeff Bloom. "She was a little bit keyed up in the paddock, but when I saw her come to those horses in the turn, I thought, 'I think she's handling the two turns,' and from there it was just fun watching."

On April 1, she made her first start at the Grade I level in the Santa Anita Oaks, in which she went off as the 3-5 favorite in a field of nine. She settled in eighth place behind a slow early pace before starting her move three wide around the final turn. She then pulled away in the stretch to win by 3 1/2 lengths. "She's special, I'm telling you," said Smith. "Although she was probably a little farther back than anyone expected, it was almost... I'm not going to compare it to riding Zenyatta, but I used to be way back there and I wasn't worried because I knew that she could catch them. She gives me that great turn of foot, and I want to give her something to run at or she'll put the air brakes on."

The three wins gave Midnight Bisou 160 points on the 2018 Road to the Kentucky Oaks, qualifying her in first place and making her one of the early favorites for the race. "I am shaking. I'm speechless," said Bloom, celebrating the first Grade I win for his stable. “I don't even know how I feel about the Kentucky Oaks, because you don't think of it that way until you do. But now it's a reality and I'm living it, enjoying it, and pinching myself constantly."

The Kentucky Oaks, the fillies' equivalent of the Kentucky Derby, was held on May 4 at Churchill Downs. It attracted a full field of fourteen, with Midnight Bisou going off as the post-time favorite at odds of 2.3-1. The second favorite at 2.6-1 was Monomoy Girl, who had won the Ashland Stakes on April 7 to qualify for the Oaks. The field included eight other graded stakes winners, including Coach Rocks (Gulfstream Park Oaks), Wonder Gadot (Mazarine, Demoiselle Stakes), Rayya (UAE Oaks), and My Miss Lilly (Gazelle Stakes).

Breaking from post position 10, Midnight Bisou was squeezed at the start and raced at the back of the pack while moving three wide around the first turn. On the second turn, she was carried seven wide. With three-eighths of a mile remaining in the race, she was in tenth place, 8 1/2 lengths behind Monomoy Girl, who had moved to the lead after stalking the early pace. In the stretch, Midnight Bisou closed steadily to finish third, 4 1/4 lengths behind Monomoy Girl with Wonder Gadot in second. "I don't know if the bad start cost me the race, but it cost me enough," said Smith. "We will never know."

Midnight Bisou was given a brief layoff, during which Madaket Stables, owned by Sol Kumin, bought a minority share. She was also transferred to the stable of Steve Asmussen as her owners wished to pursue major stakes on the East Coast, instead of staying in California where Spawr was based. She returned to the racetrack on June 30 in the Mother Goose Stakes at Belmont Park. Facing only three rivals, she raced close to the pace and kicked clear at the head of the stretch to win by six lengths.

On July 22, Midnight Bisou made her next start in the Coaching Club American Oaks at Saratoga. Monomoy Girl went to the early lead and set a moderate pace, completing the half mile in :48.23 and the three-quarters in 1:12.43. Midnight Bisou stayed just a few lengths back in third and moved into second as they turned into the stretch but was unable to close ground on Monomoy Girl, losing by three lengths.

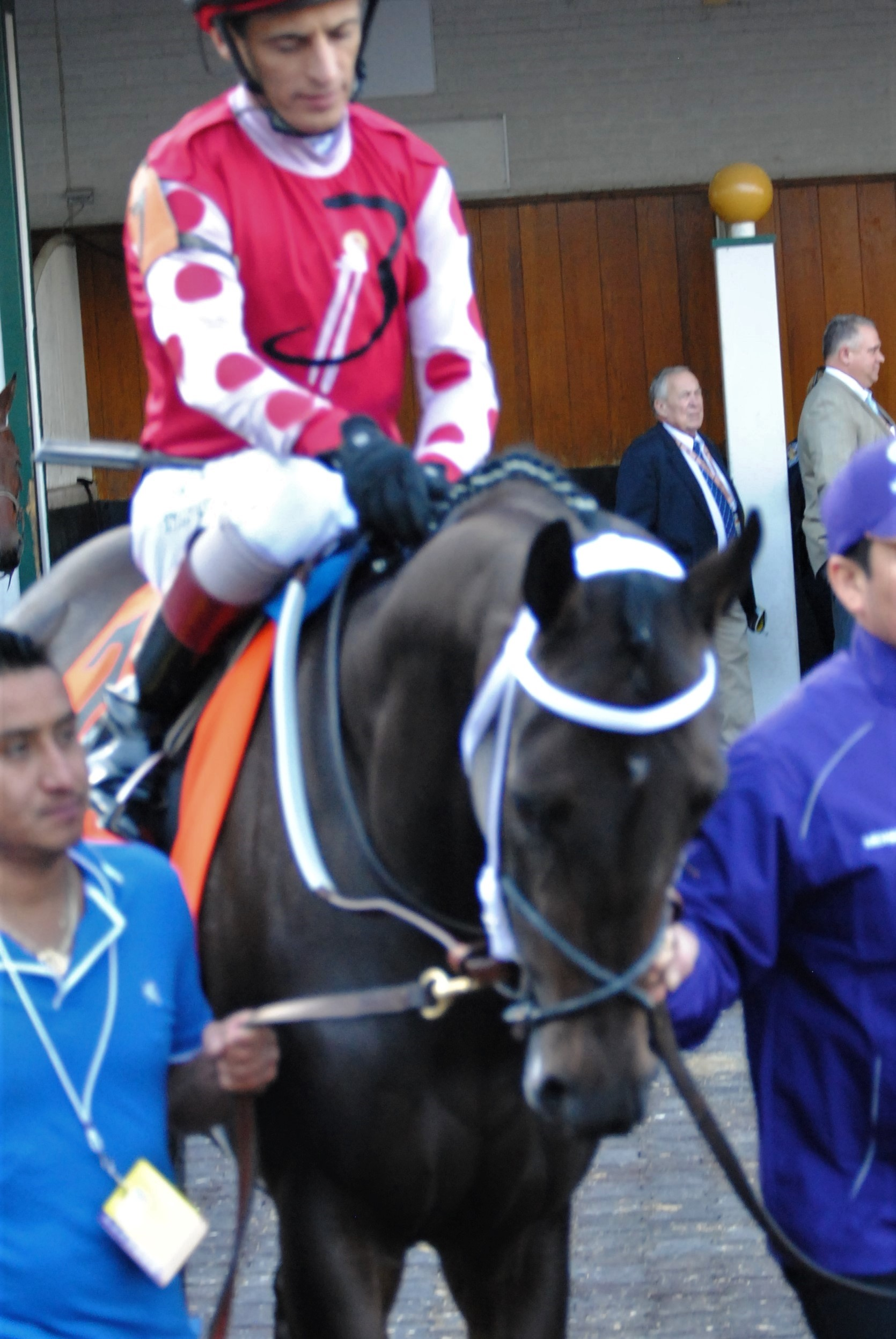
Midnight Bisou at the 2018 Breeders' Cup

Monomoy Girl bypassed the Alabama Stakes at Saratoga on August 18 so Midnight Bisou went off as the 3-2 favorite in a field of eight. She raced in sixth place for the first three-quarters of a mile while racing three wide, then started to make up ground on the final turn. However, she could not match the closing burst of Eskimo Kisses, who closed from last to finish first by 6 1/2 lengths, with She's a Julie in second a head in front of Midnight Bisou. "A mile and a quarter might be a bit too far," Smith commented, "and this is probably not her favorite racetrack. She moves over Belmont better than she moves over this track."

On September 22, she faced off again with Monomoy Girl in the Cotillion Stakes at Parx Racing. The track was deep, especially along the rail, resulting in slow times across the card. Monomoy Girl tracked the early pace in third while Midnight Bisou sat a few lengths farther back in fifth. Monomoy Girl took the lead without urging as they exited the backstretch and gradually opened up her lead. Midnight Bisou started her move on the outside, then moved to the rail as she started to make up ground in the stretch. In midstretch, Monomoy Girl began to wander toward the rail so Midnight Bisou was switched to the outside. Then Monomoy Girl began to drift steadily towards the outside, forcing Midnight Bisou to move out still further. At the wire, Monomoy Girl was ahead by a neck but wound up being disqualified in a controversial decision. "I went inside because everyone was going out," said Smith, "and I was going straight as an arrow. [Monomoy Girl] chose to come over and take it from me, so I chose the outer route, and there probably wouldn't have been a DQ if she would have just stayed straight at that point. But then she came out again and we ended up in the eight, nine path. I never got a straight run and I only got beat a neck."

Both Monomoy Girl and Midnight Bisou received a Beyer Speed Figure of 101 for the race, a career best for both at the time.

Midnight Bisou finished the year with a third-place finish in the Breeders' Cup Distaff, finishing 1 1/2 lengths behind Monomoy Girl. In the 2018 World's Best Racehorse Rankings, Midnight Bisou was rated at 115 pounds, three pounds below Momonoy Girl.

=== 2019: four-year-old campaign ===
Midnight Bisou made her four-year-old debut in the Houston Ladies Classic at Sam Houston Race Park on January 27. She went off as the 1-5 favorite in a field of six while carrying 123 pounds, seven pounds more than the second betting choice, Remedy. She settled at the back of the pack then made a late run, taking the lead in the final strides to win by three-quarters of a length. "It's her first race back, and I was really getting forced out in the first turn, and it would have had to be six-, seven-, eight-wide the whole way, so I thought, 'Let's take it a little easy on her,' so I dropped in behind them," said Smith. "By the time I did that, they had slowed the pace down... But once she got going, her best stride was probably two strides past the wire, to be honest with you."

On March 16, Midnight Bisou made her next start in the Azeri Stakes at Oaklawn Park where the field of five included four Grade I winners. The post-time favorite was multiple stakes winner Elate, who had not raced since finishing second in the Personal Ensign Stakes to champion Abel Tasman in August. Because of the layoff, Elate carried two pounds fewer than Midnight Bisou. Tapa Tapa Tapa set a moderate early pace with Midnight Bisou and Elate trading places between third and fourth, a few lengths off the lead. On the rail turning for home, Midnight Bisou lacked racing room so Smith waited until a hole opened in midstretch. At that point, Midnight Bisou accelerated and drew clear to win by a length over Elate. "She was loaded," said Smith. "I basically placed her and she did the rest."

Midnight Bisou carried the top weight of 122 pounds in the Apple Blossom Handicap, 2 pounds more than Elate and five more than Escape Clause (La Cañada Stakes). She raced at the back of the pack for the first half mile, then started her move four wide on the far turn. She and Escape Clause battled down the stretch with Midnight Bisou prevailing by a nose. "I sat back with Elate and waited to make my move," said Smith. "She had to fight for it, but she ran big."

Once again carrying the top weight of 123 pounds, Midnight Bisou next entered the Ogden Phipps Stakes on June 8 at Belmont Park. Carrying 117 pounds, Come Dancing was made the 4-5 favorite in a field of five after earning a career high Beyer Speed Figure in her previous start. Come Dancing set the early pace, but Midnight Bisou was never more than a few lengths back. Turning into the stretch, Midnight Bisou accelerated and pulled away to win by 3 1/2 lengths while setting a stakes record of 1:39.69 for 1 1/16 miles. "She makes you so proud," Asmussen said. "She's just a special horse and I'm proud to be associated with her. I believe she's added to how great she is with consistency. She's expecting to win, and I think the results speak for themselves."

Midnight Bisou made her next start in the Molly Pitcher Stakes at Monmouth Park on July 20. The race was delayed for three hours due to exceptionally high temperatures along the east coast, although the sea breeze at Monmouth Park made it somewhat easier on the horses. Midnight Bisou again rated a few lengths off the pace, then found racing room in the stretch and accelerated to win by a length. "You could tell Mike had so much horse, and when it was all said and done, in midstretch he was reining her in. She was in cruise control," Bloom said. "She showed no signs of distress after the race. It really was cruising through the park."

Midnight Bisou returned to Saratoga for the Personal Ensign Stakes on August 24, in which she carried the top weight of 124 pounds. She again faced Elate, carrying 120 pounds, who had won the Fleur de Lis and Delaware Handicaps since the two had last met in the Apple Blossom. Because Midnight Bisou had never won at the distance of 1 1/8 miles, Elate went off as the favorite. Midnight Bisou trailed the field during the first half mile, then shifted to the outside around the final turn. She closed ground on Elate, who had taken over the lead at the head of the stretch. The two battled down the stretch with Midnight Bisou winning by a nose in a photo finish. "I'm just lost for words describing how amazing this filly is because she's just in a different league all together," said Bloom. "And she's getting better.

"I've been around a lot of good fillies, but there's something good and unique about this filly," said Asmussen. "Her personality and demeanor. Her ability to take care of herself and her will to win. Because we all know if she doesn't have that will to win, she's not going to win the races that she does."

With the win, Midnight Bisou earned a "Win and You're In" berth in the 2019 Breeders' Cup Distaff.

In the NTRA Top Thoroughbred Poll of August 26, she was ranked second among all active race horses in North America, behind just Bricks and Mortar.

Midnight Bisou made her next start in the Beldame Stakes at Belmont on September 28, ridden by John Velazquez as Mike Smith was not available for the race. She was the overwhelming favorite in a field of five, going off at odds of 3-20. She bumped with Spring in the Wind at the start, then settled a length behind her during the first half mile. Around the turn, Midnight Bisou edged to the lead, joined by Wow Cat. Spring in the Wind gave way, eventually finishing last. Wow Cat remained in contention until late in the stretch when Midnight Bisou started to draw away, winning by 3 1/2 lengths. "It was pretty easy for her," Velazquez said. "I didn't have to do very much."

Despite some interest in having her make her final start of the year against male horses in the Breeders' Cup Classic, Bloom said they would stick to the fillies and mares division. "She's done everything we've wanted her to do this year, and that started with (targeting) the Breeders' Cup Distaff and working back. So at this point, the logical thing is to follow that path and take down that division with a perfect year."

Her owners originally planned to sell Midnight Bisou at the Fasig-Tipton November sale as a broodmare prospect. However, shortly before the Distaff, Bloom announced that she had been withdrawn from the sale and would race in 2020.

In the Breeder's Cup Distaff, Midnight Bisou was defeated by the Argentinian mare Blue Prize, who was then sold as a broodmare prospect at the Fasig-Tipton sale.

=== 2020: five-year-old campaign ===
Midnight Bisou started her 2020 campaign with a second place in the 2020 edition of The Saudi Cup, behind only Maximum Security. Maximum Security was subsequently disqualified for a presumed drug violation, which elevated Midnight Bisou to first. Midnight Bisou went on to win the Fleur De Lis Stakes and place second in the Personal Ensign Stakes. On September 30, 2020, it was announced that she would be retired following a sesamoid fracture after a September 28 workout.

In the 2020 World's Best Racehorse Rankings, Midnight Bisou was rated on 118, making her the equal 80th best racehorse in the world.

== Racing statistics ==
Date	Distance	Race	Grade	Track	Odds	Field	Finish	Winning Time	Margin	Jockey	Ref
2017 – two-year-old season
Oct 27, 2017	6 furlongs	Maiden Special Weight	Maiden	Santa Anita	21.10	11	2	1:10.44	(nose)	Tiago Pereira	
Nov 18, 2017	7 furlongs	Desi Arnaz Stakes	Listed	Del Mar	2.40	5	2	1:23.69	(nose)	Rafael Bejarano	
2018 – three-year-old season
Jan 7, 2018	7 furlongs	Santa Ynez Stakes	II	Santa Anita	1.80	8	1	1:23.40	4 1/2 lengths	Mike E. Smith	
Mar 3, 2018	1 1/16 miles	Santa Ysabel Stakes	III	Santa Anita	0.30*	5	1	1:41.10	2 1/4 lengths	Mike E. Smith	
Apr 7, 2018	1 1/16 miles	Santa Anita Oaks	I	Santa Anita	0.60*	9	1	1:44.79	3 1/2 lengths	Mike E. Smith	
May 4, 2018	1 1/8 miles	Kentucky Oaks	I	Churchill Downs	2.30*	14	3	1:49.13	(4 1/4 lengths)	Mike E. Smith	
Jun 30, 2018	1 1/16 miles	Mother Goose Stakes	II	Belmont Park	0.45*	4	1	1:41.02	6 lengths	Mike E. Smith	
Jul 22, 2018	1 1/8 miles	Coaching Club American Oaks	I	Saratoga	1.35	5	2	1:50.46	(3 lengths)	Mike E. Smith	
Aug 18, 2018	1 1/4 miles	Alabama Stakes	I	Saratoga	1.35*	8	3	2:03.22	(6 1/2 lengths)	Mike E. Smith	
Sep 22, 2018	1 1/16 miles	Cotillion Stakes	I	Parx Racing	4.20	8	1 (Note: Monomoy Girl crossed the finish line a neck in front but was disqualified to second for interference)	1:45.95	(neck)	Mike E. Smith	
Nov 3, 2018	1 1/8 miles	Breeders' Cup Distaff	I	Churchill Downs	5.90	11	3	1:49.79	(1 1/2 lengths)	John Velazquez	
2019 – four-year-old season
Jan 27, 2019	1 1/16 miles	Houston Ladies Classic	III	Sam Houston	0.20*	6	1	1:44.52	3/4 lengths	Mike E. Smith	
Mar 16, 2019	1 1/16 miles	Azeri Stakes	II	Oaklawn Park	1.20	5	1	1:42.72	1 length	Mike E. Smith	
Apr 14, 2019	1 1/16 miles	Apple Blossom Handicap	I	Oaklawn Park	0.90*	6	1	1:43.88	nose	Mike E. Smith	
Jun 8, 2019	1 1/16 miles	Ogden Phipps Stakes	I	Belmont Park	1.70	5	1	1:39.69 (Note: New stakes record)	3 1/2 lengths	Mike E. Smith	
Jul 20, 2019	1 1/16 miles	Molly Pitcher Stakes	III	Monmouth Park	0.05*	5	1	1:43.55	1 length	Mike E. Smith	
Aug 24, 2019	1 1/8 miles	Personal Ensign Stakes	I	Saratoga	1.70	6	1	1:47.92	nose	Mike E. Smith	
Sep 28, 2019	1 1/8 miles	Beldame Stakes	II	Belmont	0.15*	5	1	1:48.86	3 1/2 lengths	John Velazquez	
Nov 2, 2019	1 1/8 miles	Breeder's Cup Distaff	I	Santa Anita	1.00*	11	2	1:50.50	(2 lengths)	Mike E. Smith	
2020 – five-year-old season
Feb 29, 2020	1 1/8 miles	Saudi Cup	N/A	King Abdulaziz (KSA)	8.00	14	1 (Note: Maximum Security crossed the line first, but has then been disqualified after an investigation by the Jockey Club of Saudi Arabia. Midnight Bisou has been declared the winner.)	1:50.58	(3/4 lengths)	Mike E. Smith	
Jun 27, 2020	1 1/8 miles	Fleur De Lis Stakes	II	Churchill Downs	0.50*	7	1	1:48.99	6 lengths	Mike E. Smith	
Aug 1, 2020	1 1/8 miles	Personal Ensign Stakes	I	Saratoga	0.30*	6	2	1:47.82	(neck)	Ricardo Santana, Jr.	

An (*) asterisk after the odds means Midnight Bisou was the post-time favorite.

== Breeding career ==
Midnight Bisou went through the 2020 Fasig-Tipton November Sale with ELiTE Sales, selling for $5 million to Chuck Allen as a broodmare prospect. In 2021 Midnight Bisou was bred to Curlin and foaled a dark bay colt on 14 February 2022.

In November 2022 Midnight Bisou, in foal to Tapit, was sent through the auction ring again at the Keeneland November Breeding Stock Sale as a supplement. She was sold for $5.5 million to Katsumi Yoshida of Northern Farm, who shipped the horse to Japan.

In 2024 she foaled a filly by Kitasan Black.

== Pedigree ==
Pedigree of Midnight Bisou, dark bay filly, April 18, 2015
Sire Midnight Lute 2003	Real Quiet; 1995	Quiet American	Fappiano
Sire Midnight Lute 2003	Real Quiet; 1995	Quiet American	Demure
Sire Midnight Lute 2003	Real Quiet; 1995	Really Blue	Believe It
Sire Midnight Lute 2003	Real Quiet; 1995	Really Blue	Meadow Blue
Sire Midnight Lute 2003	Candytuft; 1996	Dehere	Deputy Minister
Sire Midnight Lute 2003	Candytuft; 1996	Dehere	Sister Dot
Sire Midnight Lute 2003	Candytuft; 1996	Bolt From The Blue	Blue Times
Sire Midnight Lute 2003	Candytuft; 1996	Bolt From The Blue	Berkut
Dam Diva Delite 2007	Repent (USA); 1999	Louis Quatorze	Sovereign Dancer
Dam Diva Delite 2007	Repent (USA); 1999	Louis Quatorze	On to Royalty
Dam Diva Delite 2007	Repent (USA); 1999	Baby Grace	Cipayo
Dam Diva Delite 2007	Repent (USA); 1999	Baby Grace	Kathy
Dam Diva Delite 2007	Tour Hostess; 1996	Tour d'Or	Medaille d'Or
Dam Diva Delite 2007	Tour Hostess; 1996	Tour d'Or	Debby's Turn
Dam Diva Delite 2007	Tour Hostess; 1996	Counsels Gal	High Counsel
Dam Diva Delite 2007	Tour Hostess; 1996	Counsels Gal	TNT Gal (family 21) (Note: TNT Gal traces back in the female line to Selima, who was originally thought to belong to family 15 but subsequently shown to be a member of family 21, as confirmed by mitochondrial DNA testing)
