= Fleur de Lis Stakes =

- Class: Grade II
- Location: Churchill Downs; Louisville, Kentucky, United States
- Inaugurated: 1975 (as Fleur de Lis Handicap)
- Race type: Thoroughbred – Flat racing

Race information
- Distance: 1 1/8 miles (9 furlongs)
- Surface: Dirt
- Track: left-handed
- Qualification: Fillies & Mares, three-years-old and older
- Weight: 124 lbs with allowances
- Purse: US$500,000 (2024)
- Bonuses: Winner automatic entry into Breeders' Cup Distaff

The Fleur de Lis Stakes is a Grade II American Thoroughbred horse race for fillies and mares age three and older over a distance of 1 1/8 miles on the dirt run annually in late-June or early-July at Churchill Downs in Louisville, Kentucky.

== History ==
The event was inaugurated on 31 May 1975 as the Fleur de Lis Handicap and was won by the favorite Bundler defeating four other runners on a sloppy track in the time of 1:39 2/5 over the mile distance. The event was held over the same distance for one more year before being extended to 1 1/16 miles.

The event is named after the English translation for the French "fleur-de-lis", a flower of the lily. The lily is the symbol of the Louisville flag, the location where the event is held. The lily has traditionally been used to represent French royalty and Louisville, named for the French king Louis XVI.

In 1983 the distance for the event was increased to 1 1/8 miles.

The event's condition from 1983–85 and 1987–89 was for four-year-olds & older.

The event was upgraded to Grade III in 1988 and again to Grade II in 2002.

Since 2015 the event has been a Breeders' Cup Challenge "Win and You’re In" for the Distaff Division.

The event has gained status over the recent years and has attracted some fine horses including the 2009 US Horse of the Year Rachel Alexandra who easily won the race as a short favorite by the near stakes record of 10 1/2 lengths.

In 2023 the event was moved to Ellis Park after Churchill Downs closed their spring meeting earlier due to a spate of injuries.

== Records ==
Speed record:

- 1 1/8 miles: 1:48.26 – Heritage of Gold (2000)

Margins

- 11 lengths – Lt. Lao (1988)

Most wins

- 2 – Likely Exchange (1978, 1980)

Most wins by a jockey

- 3 – Shane Sellers (1995, 1998, 2000)
- 3 – Calvin H. Borel (1997, 2009, 2010)
- 3 – José Ortiz (2018, 2019, 2021)
- 3 – Joel Rosario (2013, 2017, 2023)

Most wins by a trainer

- 5 – William I. Mott (1984, 1998, 2012, 2019, 2024)

== Winners ==
Year	Winner	Age	Jockey	Trainer	Owner	Distance	Time	Purse	Grade	Ref
At Churchill Downs – Fleur de Lis Stakes
2026	Immersive	4	Irad Ortiz Jr.	Brad H. Cox	Godolphin	1 1/8 miles	1:50.51	$500,000	II	
2025	Thorpedo Anna	4	Brian Hernandez Jr.	Kenneth G. McPeek	Nader Alaali, Mark Edwards, Judy Hicks & Magdalena Racing	1 1/8 miles	1:48.52	$498,500	II	
2024	Scylla	4	Javier Castellano	William I. Mott	Juddmonte Farms	1 1/8 miles	1:49.45	$499,000	II	
At Ellis Park
2023	Pauline's Pearl	5	Joel Rosario	Steven M. Asmussen	Stonestreet Stables	1 1/8 miles	1:49.59	$367,000	II	
At Churchill Downs
2022	Shedaresthedevil	5	Florent Geroux	Brad H. Cox	Whisper Hill Farm, Qatar Racing & Flurry Racing Stables	1 1/8 miles	1:49.17	$345,000	II	
2021	Letruska	5	Jose L. Ortiz	Fausto Gutierrez	St George Stables	1 1/8 miles	1:48.57	$300,000	II	
2020	Midnight Bisou	5	Mike E. Smith	Steven M. Asmussen	Bloom Racing Stable, Madaket Stables & Allen Racing	1 1/8 miles	1:48.99	$200,000	II	
Fleur de Lis Handicap
2019	Elate	5	José L. Ortiz	William I. Mott	Claiborne Farm & Adele B. Dilschneider	1 1/8 miles	1:50:33	$250,000	II	
2018	Blue Prize (ARG)	5	José L. Ortiz	Ignacio Correas IV	Merriebelle Stable	1 1/8 miles	1:50:02	$200,000	II	
2017	Forever Unbridled	5	Joel Rosario	Dallas Stewart	Charles E. Fipke	1 1/8 miles	1:49.94	$200,000	II	
2016	Paid Up Subscriber	4	Ricardo Santana Jr.	Albert Stall Jr.	Klaravitch Stables	1 1/8 miles	1:48.44	$200,000	II	
2015	Frivolous	5	Jon Court	Victoria H. Oliver	G. Watts Humphrey Jr.	1 1/8 miles	1:49.22	$200,000	II	
2014	Molly Morgan	5	Corey J. Lanerie	Dale L. Romans	William D. Cubbedge	1 1/8 miles	1:50.11	$216,200	II	
2013	Funny Proposition	4	Joel Rosario	Mark E. Casse	John C. Oxley	1 1/8 miles	1:50.22	$186,375	II	
2012	Royal Delta	4	Mike E. Smith	William I. Mott	Besilu Stables	1 1/8 miles	1:49.49	$161,700	II	
2011	Race not held									
2010	Rachel Alexandra	4	Calvin H. Borel	Steven M. Asmussen	Jess Jackson	1 1/8 miles	1:48.87	$214,000	II	
2009	Miss Isella	4	Calvin H. Borel	Ian R. Wilkes	Domino Stud	1 1/8 miles	1:49.59	$221,600	II	
2008	Hystericalady	5	Garrett K. Gomez	Jerry Hollendorfer	Rancho San Miguel, Tom Clark, George Todaro & Jerry Hollendorfer	1 1/8 miles	1:50.88	$321,900	II	
2007	Indian Vale	5	John R. Velazquez	Todd A. Pletcher	Melnyk Racing	1 1/8 miles	1:49.12	$327,600	II	
2006	Happy Ticket	5	Julien R. Leparoux	Andrew Leggio Jr.	Stewart Madison	1 1/8 miles	1:49.23	$321,900	II	
2005	Two Trail Sioux	4	Pat Day	Wallace Dollase	Don Winton & John D. Gunther	1 1/8 miles	1:48.53	$330,000	II	
2004	Adoration	5	Victor Espinoza	David E. Hofmans	Amerman Racing	1 1/8 miles	1:52.15	$439,200	II	
2003	You	4	Jerry D. Bailey	Robert J. Frankel	Edmund A. Gann	1 1/8 miles	1:49.12	$327,900	II	
2002	Spain	5	Jorge F. Chavez	D. Wayne Lukas	The Thoroughbred Corp.	1 1/8 miles	1:49.64	$329,400	II	
2001	Saudi Poetry	4	Victor Espinoza	Bob Baffert	The Thoroughbred Corp.	1 1/8 miles	1:49.27	$333,000	III	
2000	Heritage of Gold	5	Shane Sellers	Thomas M. Amoss	Jack Garey	1 1/8 miles	1:48.26	$324,600	III	
1999	Banshee Breeze	4	Robby Albarado	Carl A. Nafzger	Jayeff B. Stable & James B. Tafel	1 1/8 miles	1:50.02	$309,333	III	
1998	Escena	5	Shane Sellers	William I. Mott	Allen E. Paulson	1 1/8 miles	1:50.19	$321,000	III	
1997	Gold n Delicious	4	Calvin H. Borel	Bobby C. Barnett	John A. Franks	1 1/8 miles	1:52.87	$168,900	III	
1996	Serena's Song	4	Gary L. Stevens	D. Wayne Lukas	Robert & Beverly Lewis	1 1/8 miles	1:50.30	$168,450	III	
1995	Fit to Lead	5	Shane Sellers	Richard E. Mandella	Jim Colbert, Randall D. Hubbard, Connie Sczesney	1 1/8 miles	1:51.59	$164,700	III	
1994	Trishyde	5	Chris McCarron	Jules Vogel	B. Wayne Hughes	1 1/8 miles	1:51.34	$165,100	III	
1993	Quilma (CHI)	6	Randy Romero	Claude R. McGaughey III	Tri-Honors Stable	1 1/8 miles	1:50.80	$109,600	III	
1992	Bungalow	5	Francisco C. Torres	Harvey L. Vanier	Nancy A. Vanier	1 1/8 miles	1:50.87	$115,100	III	
1991	Maskra's Lady	4	Joe M. Johnson	Gary G. Hartlage	Max Wilson, Freireich & Greene	1 1/8 miles	1:50.46	$113,100	III	
1990	A Penny Is a Penny	5	Aaron Gryder	Steven L. Morguelan	David Levitch	1 1/8 miles	1:51.20	$109,200	III	
1989	Stoneleigh's Hope	4	Joseph Deegan	Michael H. Bell	Lockhart Spears	1 1/8 miles	1:52.60	$109,900	III	
1988	Lt. Lao	4	Don Brumfield	James M. Eakins	Robert Keller	1 1/8 miles	1:49.60	$115,150	III	
1987	Infinidad (CHI)	5	Mickey Solomone	Dewey Smith	Arthur Hancock III	1 1/8 miles	1:50.60	$103,100		
1986	Queen Alexandra	4	Don Brumfield	George M. Baker	Mrs. Morton Rosenthal	1 1/8 miles	1:49.20	$101,250		
1985	Straight Edition	5	Charles R. Woods Jr.	Michael B. Ball	Donamire Farm (Don & Mira Ball)	1 1/8 miles	1:50.80	$55,550		
1984	Heatherten	5	Sam Maple	William I. Mott	John A. Franks	1 1/8 miles	1:51.40	$54,205		
1983	Try Something New	4	Pat Day	Claude R. McGaughey III	John A. Bell III	1 1/8 miles	1:51.60	$54,350		
1982	Classic Ambition	4	William Gavidia	Claude R. McGaughey III	Latour Farms	1 1/16 miles	1:44.80	$57,950		
1981	Forever Cordial	4	Darrell Haire	John T. Ward Jr.	John C. Oxley	1 1/16 miles	1:45.40	$35,700		
1980	Likely Exchange	6	Mark S. Sellers	Thomas H. Stevens Sr.	G. Watts Humphrey Jr. & Pamela Firman	1 1/16 miles	1:45.00	$35,425		
1979	Table the Rumor	5	David E. Whited	Frank L. Brothers	Albert M. Stall Sr.	1 1/16 miles	1:45.20	$35,175		
1978	Likely Exchange	4	James McKnight	Thomas H. Stevens Sr.	Mrs. George Humphrey	1 1/16 miles	1:45.40	$21,375		
1977	Go On Dreaming	5	Paul Nicolo	James E. Morgan	G. A. Zimmerman & E. J. Zweisler	1 1/16 miles	1:43.80	$22,125		
1976	Pago Hop	4	Eddie Arroyo	John Oxley	Raymond Salmen	1 mile	1:38.40	$21,625		
1975	Bundler	4	Jimmy Nichols	Anthony L. Basile	Bwamazon Farm	1 mile	1:39.40	$22,325		

== See also ==
List of American and Canadian Graded races
