= Ogden Phipps Stakes =

- Class: Grade I
- Location: Belmont Park; Elmont, New York, United States
- Inaugurated: 1961 (as Hempstead Handicap)
- Race type: Thoroughbred – Flat racing
- Website: NYRA

Race information
- Distance: 1 1/16 miles (8.5 furlongs)
- Surface: Dirt
- Track: left-handed
- Qualification: Fillies & Mares, four-years-old and older
- Weight: 124 lbs. with allowances
- Purse: $500,000 (2021)

The Ogden Phipps Stakes is an American Grade I Thoroughbred horse race for fillies and mares, four years of age and older run over a distance of one and one-sixteenth miles on the dirt track held annually in mid June at Belmont Park in Elmont, New York.

== History ==
Inaugurated in 1961 as the Hempstead Handicap and was run at 1 1/2 miles for both sexes. The event was not run again until 1970. It was raced under that name until 2002 when it was renamed in honor of prominent owner and breeder, Ogden Phipps (1908–2002). His horses won this race in 1988 and 1990.

The race was run at 6 furlongs in 1970 and 1971; a 1 1/8 miles from 1974 through 1994. It was hosted by Aqueduct Racetrack in Queens, New York in 1973 and 1974.

The event was upgraded to Grade I in 1984.

In 2014 the conditions of the event were changed from handicap to stakes allowance and the name of the event was modified to the Ogden Phipps Stakes.

In 2024 the event was moved to Saratoga Racetrack due to infield tunnel and redevelopment work at Belmont Park and the distance of the event was increased to 1 1/8 furlongs.

== Records ==
Speed record: (at current distance of 1 1/16 miles)

- 1:39.69 – Midnight Bisou (2019)

Speed Record: Distance of 1 1/8 miles

- 1:46.64 - Nitrogen (horse)(2026)

Margins:

- 12 3/4 lengths – Nitrogen (horse) (2026)

Most wins:

- 2 – Hearten (1984, 1985)
- 2 – Sightseek (2003, 2004)
- 2 – Take D'Tour (2006, 2007)
- 2 – Clairiere (2022, 2023)

Most wins by a jockey:

- 5 – Eddie Maple (1975, 1977, 1983, 1986, 1992)
- 5 – Mike E. Smith (1981, 1984, 2017, 2018, 2019)
- 5 – John R. Velazquez (2002, 2005, 2010, 2011, 2025)

Most wins by a trainer:

- 4 – Steven M. Asmussen (2019, 2020, 2022, 2023)

Most wins by an owner:

- 3 – Juddmonte Farms (2003, 2004, 2014)
- 3 – Stonestreet Stables (2016, 2022, 2023)

== Winners ==
Year	Winner	Age	Jockey	Trainer	Owner	Distance	Time	Purse	Grade	Ref
At Saratoga – Ogden Phipps Stakes
2026	Nitrogen	4	José Ortiz	Mark E. Casse	D.J. Stables LLC	1 1/8 miles	1:46.64	$500,000	I	
2025	Dorth Vader	5	John R. Velazquez	George Weaver	John Ropes	1 1/8 miles	1:49.10	$485,000	I	
2024	Randomized	4	Joel Rosario	Chad C. Brown	Klaravich Stables	1 1/8 miles	1:49.58	$500,000	I	
At Belmont Park
2023	Clairiere	5	Joel Rosario	Steven M. Asmussen	Stonestreet Stables	1 1/16 miles	1:43.40	$500,000	I	
2022	Clairiere	4	Joel Rosario	Steven M. Asmussen	Stonestreet Stables	1 1/16 miles	1:41.10	$480,000	I	
2021	Letruska	5	Jose Ortiz	Fausto Gutierrez	St. George Stable	1 1/16 miles	1:41.25	$480,000	I	
2020	She's a Julie	5	Ricardo Santana Jr.	Steven M. Asmussen	Bradley Thor., T. & A. Cambron, Denali Stud, Rigney Racing, Madaket Stables	1 1/16 miles	1:40.27	$300,000	I	
2019	Midnight Bisou	4	Mike E. Smith	Steven M. Asmussen	Bloom Racing Stable, Madaket Stables, Allen Racing	1 1/16 miles	1:39.69	$651,000	I	
2018	Abel Tasman	4	Mike E. Smith	Bob Baffert	China Horse Club International & Clearsky Farms	1 1/16 miles	1:40.36	$717,500	I	
2017	Songbird	4	Mike E. Smith	Jerry Hollendorfer	Fox Hill Farms	1 1/16 miles	1:42.24	$735,000	I	
2016	Cavorting	4	Florent Geroux	Kiaran P. McLaughlin	Stonestreet Stables	1 1/16 miles	1:40.14	$980,000	I	
2015	Wedding Toast	5	Jose Lezcano	Kiaran P. McLaughlin	Godolphin Racing	1 1/16 miles	1:40.21	$955,000	I	
2014	Close Hatches	4	Joel Rosario	William I. Mott	Juddmonte Farm	1 1/16 miles	1:40.55	$955,000	I	
Ogden Phipps Handicap
2013	Tiz Miz Sue	6	Joseph Rocco Jr.	Steve Hobby	CresRan LLC	1 1/16 miles	1:40.81	$400,000	I	
2012	It's Tricky	4	Eddie Castro	Kiaran P. McLaughlin	Godolphin Racing	1 1/16 miles	1:41.73	$392,000	I	
2011	Awesome Maria	4	John R. Velazquez	Todd A. Pletcher	E. Paul Robsham Stables	1 1/16 miles	1:41.40	$245,000	I	
2010	Life At Ten	5	John R. Velazquez	Todd A. Pletcher	Cynthia DeBartolo	1 1/16 miles	1:40.72	$245,000	I	
2009	Seattle Smooth	4	Ramon A. Dominguez	Anthony W. Dutrow	Mercedes Stable	1 1/16 miles	1:42.13	$300,000	I	
2008	Ginger Punch	5	Rafael Bejarano	Robert J. Frankel	Stronach Stables	1 1/16 miles	1:42.37	$300,000	I	
2007	Take D' Tour	6	Eibar Coa	David Fawkes	Alice Muller	1 1/16 miles	1:41.39	$300,000	I	
2006	Take D' Tour	5	Cornelio Velásquez	David Fawkes	Alice Muller	1 1/16 miles	1:42.63	$300,000	I	
2005	Ashado	4	John R. Velazquez	Todd A. Pletcher	Starlight Stables et al.	1 1/16 miles	1:41.02	$294,000	I	
2004	Sightseek	5	Jerry D. Bailey	Robert J. Frankel	Juddmonte Farms	1 1/16 miles	1:41.46	$285,000	I	
2003	Sightseek	4	Jerry D. Bailey	Robert J. Frankel	Juddmonte Farms	1 1/16 miles	1:40.89	$300,000	I	
2002	Raging Fever	4	John R. Velazquez	Mark A. Hennig	Edward P. Evans	1 1/16 miles	1:41.75	$300,000	I	
Hempstead Handicap
2001	Critical Eye	4	Michael J. Luzzi	Scott M. Schwartz	Herbert Schwartz	1 1/16 miles	1:42.18	$250,000	I	
2000	Beautiful Pleasure	5	Jorge F. Chavez	John T. Ward Jr.	John C. Oxley	1 1/16 miles	1:41.54	$250,000	I	
1999	Sister Act	4	Pat Day	Jeffrey N. Jacobs	D. & P. Sutherland	1 1/16 miles	1:40.79	$250,000	I	
1998	Mossflower	4	Robbie Davis	Richard E. Schosberg	Whitewood Farm	1 1/16 miles	1:39.90	$250,000	I	
1997	Hidden Lake	4	Richard Migliore	John C. Kimmel	Robert Clay & Tracy Farmer	1 1/16 miles	1:40.87	$250,000	I	
1996	Serena's Song	4	Jerry D. Bailey	D. Wayne Lukas	Bob & Beverly Lewis	1 1/16 miles	1:41.60	$204,400	I	
1995	Heavenly Prize	4	Pat Day	Claude R. McGaughey III	Ogden Mills Phipps	1 1/16 miles	1:43.20	$145,500	I	
1994	Sky Beauty	4	Mike E. Smith	H. Allen Jerkens	Georgia E. Hofmann	1 1/8 miles	1:47.40	$150,000	I	
1993	Turnback the Alarm	4	Chris Antley	William V. Terrill	Valley View Farm	1 1/8 miles	1:48.00	$150,000	I	
1992	Missy's Mirage	4	Eddie Maple	H. Allen Jerkens	Middletown Stable	1 1/8 miles	1:47.00	$200,000	I	
1991	A Wild Ride	4	Mike E. Smith	D. Wayne Lukas	Zenya Yoshida	1 1/8 miles	1:49.00	$200,000	I	
1990	Fantastic Find	4	Craig Perret	Claude R. McGaughey III	Ogden Phipps	1 1/8 miles	1:50.00	$232,800	I	
1989	Rose's Cantina	5	Jean Cruguet	LeRoy Jolley	Carl Icahn	1 1/8 miles	1:48.60	$225,200	I	
1988	Personal Ensign	4	Randy Romero	Claude R. McGaughey III	Ogden Phipps	1 1/8 miles	1:47.60	$219,600	I	
1987	Catatonic	5	Donald Miller Jr.	King T. Leatherbury	Woodrow Marriott	1 1/8 miles	1:50.00	$229,200	I	
1986	Endear	4	Eddie Maple	Woodford C. Stephens	Claiborne Farm	1 1/8 miles	1:48.60	$140,250	I	
1985	†Heatherten	6	Randy Romero	William I. Mott	John A. Franks	1 1/8 miles	1:48.80	$140,500	I	
1984	Heatherten	5	Sam Maple	William I. Mott	John A. Franks	1 1/8 miles	1:49.20	$154,000	I	
1983	Number	4	Eddie Maple	Woodford C. Stephens	Claiborne Farm	1 1/8 miles	1:48.40	$109,800	II	
1982	Love Sign	5	Ruben Hernandez	Sidney J. Watters Jr.	Stephen C. Clark Jr.	1 1/8 miles	1:48.00	$108,800	II	
1981	Wistful	4	Don Brumfield	Anthony J. Bardaro	Bright View Farm	1 1/8 miles	1:49.80	$107,000	II	
1980	Misty Gallore	4	Donald MacBeth	Thomas J. Kelly	Spring Hill Stable	1 1/8 miles	1:48.80	$54,600	II	
1979	Pearl Necklace	5	Jeffrey Fell	Roger Laurin	Reginald N. Webster	1 1/8 miles	1:48.60	$52,450	II	
1978	Dottie's Doll	5	Jacinto Vásquez	Paul A. Healy	Joseph R. Daly	1 1/8 miles	1:47.60	$53,400	II	
1977	Pacific Princess	4	Eddie Maple	Roger Laurin	Windfields Farm	1 1/8 miles	1:49.20	$54,500	II	
1976	Proud Delta	4	Jorge Velásquez	Peter M. Howe	Montpelier	1 1/8 miles	1:48.40	$56,150	II	
1975	Raisela	4	Eddie Maple	Laz Barrera	Harbor View Farm	1 1/8 miles	1:49.20	$55,850	II	
At Aqueduct
1974	Poker Night	4	Jorge Velásquez	H. Allen Jerkens	Hobeau Farm	1 1/8 miles	1:48.60	$55,500	II	
1973	Light Hearted	4	Eldon Nelson	Henry S. Clark	Christiana Stable	1 1/8 miles	1:48.80	$54,800	II	
At Belmont Park
1972	Summer Guest	3	Jacinto Vásquez	J. Elliott Burch	Rokeby Stable	1 1/8 miles	1:47.80	$29,025		
1971	Cold Comfort	4	Mike Venezia	Willard C. Freeman	Alfred G. Vanderbilt II	6 furlongs	1:11.60	$33,200		
1970	Ta Wee	4	John L. Rotz	Scotty Schulhofer	Tartan Stable	6 furlongs	1:10.00	$28,150		
1962–1969		Race not held								
1961	Disperse	4	William Boland	Max Hirsch	King Ranch	1 1/2 miles	2:28.40	$27,250		

† Heatherten ran as part of an entry

== See also ==
- List of American and Canadian Graded races
