= John T. Ward Jr. =

American racehorse trainer (1945–2021)

Personal information
- Born: August 2, 1945 Lexington, Kentucky, U.S.
- Died: April 24, 2021 (aged 75) Lexington, Kentucky
- Occupation: Trainer

Horse racing career
- Sport: Horse racing
- Career wins: 574

Major racing wins
- Kentucky Oaks (1995); Canadian Oaks (1995); Beldame Stakes (1999); Hempstead Handicap (2000); Raven Run Stakes (2000, 2005); Florida Derby (2001); Breeders' Futurity Stakes (2002); Gulfstream Park Handicap (2003); Arlington Oaks (2005); Super Derby (2006); Kentucky Jockey Club Stakes (2008) U.S. Triple Crown series: Kentucky Derby (2001) Breeders' Cup wins: Breeders' Cup Distaff (1999)

Significant horses
- Beautiful Pleasure, Booklet, Forest Secrets; Gal in a Ruckus, Hero's Tribute, Monarchos, Sky Mesa, Snow Dance, Strong Contender

John T. Ward Jr. (August 2, 1945 – April 24, 2021) was an American racehorse trainer. He was a graduate of the University of Kentucky with a degree in agricultural economics, where he was a member of Delta Tau Delta fraternity. He was a third-generation horseman on both sides of his family. He took charge of the family farm at age twenty-five when his father became ill in 1970.

Ward met his wife, Donna, when she was showing horses. They operated John T. Ward Stables and Sugar Grove Farm in Central Kentucky.
