= Hystericalady =

American-bred Thoroughbred racehorse

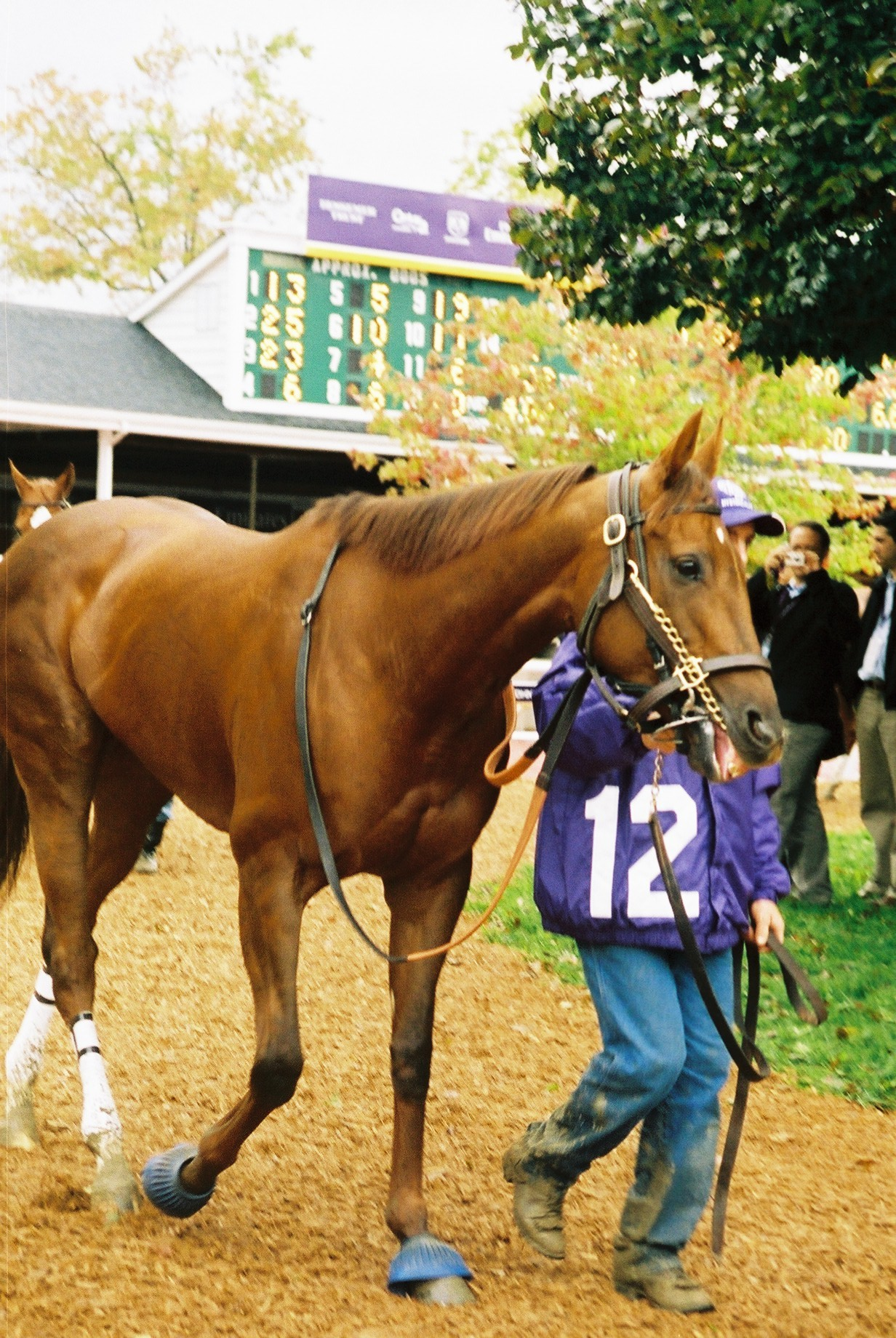
- Sire: Distorted Humor
- Grandsire: Forty Niner
- Dam: Sacramentada
- Damsire: Northair
- Sex: Mare
- Foaled: 2003
- Country: United States
- Colour: Chestnut
- Breeder: Abbott Properties
- Owner: Rancho San Miguel; Jerry Hollendorfer; George Todaro
- Trainer: Jerry Hollendorfer
- Record: 23: 11–4-2
- Earnings: $2,390,556

Major wins
- Juan Gonzalez Memorial Stakes (2005); Hollywood Breeders' Cup Oaks (2006); Humana Distaff Handicap (2007); Molly Pitcher Stakes (2007, 2008); Azeri Stakes (2008); Fleur de Lis Handicap (2008); Delaware Handicap (2008)
- Last updated on July 13, 2008

Hystericalady (foaled April 2, 2003), is a multiple stakes winning American Thoroughbred race horse.

== Background ==
Bred in Kentucky by Abbott Properties, Hystericalady is the best daughter of the leading sire Distorted Humor, the sire of the dual Classic winning gelding Funny Cide. She is a daughter of 1991 Chilean champion older mare Sacramentada. A dual group I winner in her native country, Sacramentada also won the 1992 Hawthorne Handicap racing in the U.S. After producing six US-bred foals, Sacramentada returned to Chile in 2004. Sacramentada's grandsire is Northern Dancer, therefore Hystericalady carries the blood of that sire on her top line (sire) and bottom line (dam).

Sold as a weanling at the November 2003 Keeneland Sales for $100,000, she was sold again as a yearling at the Keeneland Sales in September 2004 for $125,000, this time purchased by Jerry Hollendorfer (in partnership with Dr. George Tadaro and Tom Clark's Rancho San Miguel). Hollendorfer trained the filly at Golden Gate Fields Like Funny Cide, Hystericalady is a bright chestnut. With her win in the 2008 Delaware Handicap, she became the highest-earning horse to come from Northern California. In 2007, she lost by a neck to Ginger Punch in the Breeders' Cup Ladies Classic.

== 2008 Season ==
In the 2008 Azeri Stakes she went off as the 7-10 favorite. She won the 2008 Fleur de Lis Handicap by seven and a half lengths, giving up nine pounds to her rivals. In the 2008 Delaware Handicap she won by four lengths, tackling the distance of 10 furlongs for the first time in her career. Also in August 2008 she won the Molly Pitcher for the second time in back to back wins, taking it by nine lengths. In September 2008, running on a synthetic surface (on which her record stands at 0-for-5), she struggled the entire length of the stretch with the speed horse, Santa Teresita, as well as with the track and still finished second.

On October 24, 2008, in her second Breeders' Cup Ladies' Classic, Hystericalady was in a dead heat with Carriage Trail for fourth place against a strong field of eight Grade I winners: Zenyatta (race day favorite at 1-2 choice), Cocoa Beach, Music Note, and Ginger Punch. Ginger Punch, who won the 2007 Distaff Cup, followed by Hystericalady, finished fifth in 2008.

Hystericalady won seven graded stakes and won 10 times on different tracks.

== Race statistics ==
- 24/10/08 4th to Zenyatta in the $2,000,000 Grade I Breeders' Cup Ladies' Classic at Santa Anita Park.
- 9/27/08, 2nd to Zenyatta in the $245,000 Grade I Lady's Secret Breeders' Cup Handicap at Santa Anita Park.
- 7/24/08, 1st in the $300,000 Grade II Molly Pitcher Breeders' Cup Handicap, Monmouth Park
- 7/13/08, 1st in the $1,000,000 Grade II Delaware Handicap, Delaware Park Racetrack
- 6/14/08, 1st in the $300,000 Grade II Fleur de Lis Handicap, Churchill Downs
- 5/03/08, 3rd to Intangaroo in the $300,000 Grade I Humana Distaff Handicap, Churchill Downs
- 3/09/08, 1st in the $175,000 Grade III Azeri Stakes, Oaklawn Park Race Track
- 2/02/08, 4th to Intangaroo in the $250,000 Grade I Santa Monica Handicap, Santa Anita Park
- 10/27/07, 2nd to Ginger Punch in the $2,000,000 Grade I Breeders' Cup Ladies Classic, Monmouth Park
- 10/07/07, 2nd to Tough Tiz's Sis in the $250,000 Grade I Lady's Secret Breeders' Cup Handicap, Oak Tree At Santa Anita Park
- 8/25/07, 1st in the $300,000 Grade II Molly Pitcher Breeders' Cup Handicap, Monmouth Park
- 7/07/07, 3rd to Nashoba's Key in the $300,000 Grade I Vanity Invitational Handicap, Hollywood Park
- 6/03/07, 2nd to Nashoba's Key in the $175,000 Grade II Milady Breeders' Cup Handicap, Hollywood Park
- 5/05/07, 1st in the $300,000 Grade I Humana Distaff Handicap, Churchill Downs
- 2/24/07, 4th to Hello Lucky in the $100,000 Grade III Las Flores Handicap, Santa Anita Park
- 7/15/06, 5th to Adieu in the $500,000 Grade II Delaware Oaks, Delaware Park Racetrack
- 6/11/06, 1st in the $150,000 Grade II Hollywood Breeders' Cup Oaks, Hollywood Park
- 2005, 1st in the $40,000 Juan Gonzalez Memorial Stakes, Alameda County Fair
- 2005, 1st in her maiden effort under Russell Baze, winning by three and a half lengths.

== Retirement and Broodmare career ==
Hystericalady was purchased for $3 million by Sheikh Mohammed during the 2008 Keeneland November breeding stock sale Nov. 3 at the Central Kentucky auction house.

As of 2018, Hystericalady has foaled six offspring.

- Lady Montdore (2014 filly by Medaglia d'Oro): 7:4-1-2, earnings of $233,956. Won 2018 Glens Falls Stakes.
- Sublime (2011 colt by Medaglia d'Oro): 8:2-1-1, earnings of $120,180.
- Party Barn (2013 colt by Bernardini): 4:0-1-0, earnings of $13,790.
- She's Funny (2015 filly by Tapit): 7:0-0-1, earnings of $7,445.
- In Stitches (2012 filly by Medaglia d'Oro): 1:0-0-0, earnings of $88.
- Comical Ghost (2016 colt by Ghostzapper): Unraced.
