= Surfside =

Surfside may refer to:

== Places ==
United States

- Surfside, California or Surfside Colony
- Surfside, Florida
- Surfside, Massachusetts
- Surfside Beach, Texas
- Surfside Beach, South Carolina

== Other uses ==
- Surfside condominium building collapse in June 2021
- Surfside (horse), a racehorse
- Kinetic Gold Coast, formerly Surfside Buslines, a bus transport operator on the Gold Coast, Australia
- Surfside 6, a detective television series that aired on ABC from 1960 to 1962
- Surfside, a brand of hard iced-tea made by StateSide Urbancraft
