= Surfside (horse) =

American-bred Thoroughbred racehorse

- Sire: Seattle Slew
- Grandsire: Bold Reasoning
- Dam: Flanders
- Damsire: Seeking The Gold
- Sex: Mare
- Foaled: January 21, 1997
- Country: United States
- Colour: Bay
- Breeder: Overbrook Farm
- Owner: Overbrook Farm
- Trainer: D. Wayne Lukas
- Record: 15: 8-3-2
- Earnings: $1,852,987

Major wins
- Frizette Stakes (1999); Hollywood Starlet Stakes (1999); Santa Ysabel Stakes (2000); Las Virgenes Stakes (2000); Santa Anita Oaks (2000); Clark Handicap (2000)

Awards
- American Champion Three-Year-Old Filly (2000)

Surfside (foaled January 21, 1997) is an American Thoroughbred racehorse and broodmare. She was one of the best juvenile fillies in North America in 1999, winning four of her six races including the Frizette Stakes and the Hollywood Starlet Stakes as well a finishing third in the Breeders' Cup Juvenile Fillies. In the spring of the following year she won the Santa Ysabel Stakes, Las Virgenes Stakes and the Santa Anita Oaks and returned from injury to win the Clark Handicap. She was retired after two unsuccessful races as a four-year-old.

== Background ==
Surfside is a big, imposing bay mare standing 16.3 hands high bred in Kentucky by her owner, William T. Young's Overbrook Farm. She was sired by Seattle Slew, who won the Triple Crown and was voted American Horse of the Year in 1977. He went on to become a highly successful breeding stallion and was Leading sire in North America in 1984. His other progeny included Swale, A.P. Indy, Landaluce and Slew o' Gold. Surfside was the first foal of her dam Flanders the American Champion Two-Year-Old Filly of 1994, whose racing career was ended by an injury sustained when winning the Breeders' Cup Juvenile Fillies. As a descendant of the broodmare Furlough, Flanders was related to several major winners including One Count, Mrs Penny and Hatoof.

Surfside was sent into training with D. Wayne Lukas. She usually raced in a white hood.

== Racing career ==
=== 1999: two-year-old season ===
Surfside began her racing career in a maiden race over five and a half furlongs at Saratoga Race Course on 4 August in which she started favorite and led from the start to win by four and three quarter lengths from You And I Babe, who was in turn more than thirteen lengths clear of the six other runners. Sixteen days later over the same track she followed up with a win in an allowance race over 6 1/2 furlongs, beating Dat You Miz Blue by 1 1/2 lengths. Surfside ended her Saratoga campaign with a move up in class to contest the Grade I Spinaway Stakes over seven furlongs on September 3. Starting the 1.15/1 favorite ahead of the Bob Baffert-trained Miss Wineshine, she was always in contention but sustained her first defeat as she was beaten one and a quarter lengths into second by Circle of Life.

On October 10, the filly was sent to Belmont Park to contest the Grade I Frizette Stakes and started third choice in the betting behind Finder's Fee and Darling My Darling, who had finished first and second in the Matron Stakes. Surfside took the early lead and recovered after being headed by Darling My Darling to regain the lead in the straight and won by a head with a gap of ten lengths back to March Magic in third. Surfside was one of nine fillies to contest the sixteenth running of the Breeders' Cup Juvenile Fillies, run that year at Gulfstream Park on November 6 and started second favorite behind the Oak Leaf Stakes winner Chilukki. With jockey Pat Day riding, coming from off the pace and forced to race on the wide outside for most of the race, she finished well with a late run to take third place behind Cash Run and Chilukki, beaten 2 1/2 lengths by the winner, with Spain in fourth. On her final appearance of the year, Surfside started 0.5/1 favorite for the Starlet Stakes at Hollywood Park Racetrack on December 19. After shaking off the challenge of She's Classy on the backstretch she drew away in the closing stages to win by seven lengths.

=== 2000: three-year-old season ===
Surfside began her second season at Santa Anita Park, where she ran four times. On her three-year-old debut, she started 1/5 favorite for the Grade III Santa Ysabel Stakes on January 9 and won by eight lengths from Rings A Chime, to whom she was conceding eight pounds. Only three fillies appeared to oppose Surfside in the Grade I Las Virgenes Stakes a month later and she again started at odds of 1/5, despite conceding at least six pounds to her opponents. She took the lead on the backstretch and held off the persistent challenges of Spain and Rings A Chime to win by three quarters of a length and half a length. On March 12 Surfside faced Spain and Rings A Chime again (at level weight) in the Grade I Santa Anita Oaks and started at odds of 2/5. She disputed the lead from the start, took the advantage in the straight and held on to win by three-quarters of a length and a nose from Kumari Continent and Classy Cara. Surfside was the matched against colts in the Santa Anita Derby on April 8. She took and early lead but weakened in the stretch and finished fifth behind The Deputy, War Chant, Captain Steve and Anees. After the race it was found that the filly had bone chips in her ankle. She underwent surgery and returned to Overbrook Farm to recuperate.

After a break of more than six months, Surfside returned in the Raven Run Stakes over seven furlongs at Keeneland on October 11. She led for most of the way but was overtaken inside the final furlong and beaten one and a quarter lengths by Darling My Darling. On November 4 Surfside contested the Breeders' Cup Distaff at Churchill Downs and started at odds of 10.3/1 behind Riboletta (winner of the Beldame Stakes), Beautiful Pleasure (winner of the previous year's edition of the race) and Jostle (CCA Oaks, Alabama Stakes). Day sent Surfside to the front from the start and the filly opened up a clear lead on the backstretch and maintained a narrow advantage into the final turn. Overtaken by Spain (a 55.9/1 outsider) who challenged along the rail in the straight, she finished second, one and a half length behind the winner. Three weeks later, Surfside was matched against colts and older horses in the Grade II Clark Handicap over nine furlongs at Churchill Downs and started second favorite behind the Belmont Stakes runner-up Aptitude. She took the lead from the start and, despite being forced to race on the outside for most of the race, maintained her advantage into the straight before drawing away to win by four lengths from Guided Tour. After the race Lukas said "She did it so easily. Once Pat gets out there and has something to work with, he's awful tough to run by. I was wondering who was going to make the move, and no one did. I don't have a vote (in the Eclipse Awards), but this race made a tremendous statement. That wasn't a dimpled ballot today. It went all the way through. The beauty contest was hers today too. She won the post parade, her hair was tight, she was slick, and she walked around there with great poise. [Fillies capable of beating colts] should have a head like a princess (which Surfside doesn't have), a butt like a washer woman, and a walk like a hooker."

=== 2001: four-year-old season ===
Surfside began her third season in the Grade I Santa Monica Handicap over seven furlongs at Santa Anita on January 27 in for which she started odds on favorite despite carrying top weight of 121 pounds. She finished third, beaten a length and three length by Nany's Sweep and Serenita. On February 18 at the same track, Surfside started 2/5 favorite for the Grade I Santa Maria Handicap, but after disputing the early lead she dropped back and finished last of the five runners behind the Argentinian mare Lovellon. Pat Day said "I never had any horse today. The only thing I can come up with is she just obviously doesn't like this racetrack. She trains well over the track in the mornings, but she's just not showing up in the afternoons".

== Assessment and awards ==
In the Eclipse Awards for 1999, Surfside finished third behind Chilukki and Cash Run in the poll to decide the title of American Champion Two-Year-Old Filly.

In the Eclipse Awards for 2000, Surfside was named American Champion Three-Year-Old Filly. She received 30 votes ahead of Jostle (11 votes) and Spain.

== Breeding record ==
Surfside was retired to become a broodmare for the Overbrook Farm. In November 2009 the mare was consigned to the Breeding Stock Sale at Keeneland and bought for $500,000 by Gainesway Farm.

Her named foals are as follows:

- Shark, 2002 bay colt by Danzig, won three minor races from twenty-seven starts.
- High Surf, 2005 dark bay or brown mare by Storm Cat, won two minor races from ten starts.
- Big Surf, 2006 chestnut colt by Storm Cat, won one minor race from three starts.
- Giant Surf, 2007 chestnut colt by Giant's Causeway, won in Russia.
- Asanga, 2008 dark bay or brown colt by Smart Strike, failed to win in four races in Europe.
- Irish Surf, 2010 bay colt by Giant's Causeway, won three races including the Cougar II Handicap.
- Marlinspike, 2014 gray or roan filly by Tapit. Unraced.

== Pedigree ==
Pedigree of Surfside (USA), bay mare, 1997
Sire Seattle Slew (USA) 1974	Bold Reasoning (USA); 1968	Boldnesian	Bold Ruler
Sire Seattle Slew (USA) 1974	Bold Reasoning (USA); 1968	Boldnesian	Alanesian
Sire Seattle Slew (USA) 1974	Bold Reasoning (USA); 1968	Reason to Earn	Hail To Reason
Sire Seattle Slew (USA) 1974	Bold Reasoning (USA); 1968	Reason to Earn	Sailing Home
Sire Seattle Slew (USA) 1974	My Charmer (USA); 1969	Poker	Round Table
Sire Seattle Slew (USA) 1974	My Charmer (USA); 1969	Poker	Glamour
Sire Seattle Slew (USA) 1974	My Charmer (USA); 1969	Fair Charmer	Jet Action
Sire Seattle Slew (USA) 1974	My Charmer (USA); 1969	Fair Charmer	Myrtle Charm
Dam Flanders (USA) 1992	Seeking The Gold (USA); 1985	Mr. Prospector	Raise a Native
Dam Flanders (USA) 1992	Seeking The Gold (USA); 1985	Mr. Prospector	Gold Digger
Dam Flanders (USA) 1992	Seeking The Gold (USA); 1985	Con Game	Buckpasser
Dam Flanders (USA) 1992	Seeking The Gold (USA); 1985	Con Game	Broadway
Dam Flanders (USA) 1992	Starlet Storm (USA); 1987	Storm Bird	Northern Dancer
Dam Flanders (USA) 1992	Starlet Storm (USA); 1987	Storm Bird	South Ocean
Dam Flanders (USA) 1992	Starlet Storm (USA); 1987	Cinegita	Secretariat
Dam Flanders (USA) 1992	Starlet Storm (USA); 1987	Cinegita	Wanika (Family 25)
