= Cocoa Beach (horse) =

Chilean-bred Thoroughbred racehorse

- Sire: Doneraile Court
- Grandsire: Seattle Slew
- Dam: Visionera
- Damsire: Edgy Diplomat
- Sex: Mare
- Foaled: September 28, 2004 (age 21)
- Country: Chile
- Color: Dark Bay or Brown
- Breeder: Haras La Obra
- Owner: Los Tilos (2007); Godolphin, LLC (2008-2009)
- Trainer: Sergio Inda M. (2007) José Alvarez D. (2007) Saeed bin Suroor (2008-2009)
- Record: 17: 10-2-2
- Earnings: $1,744,595 USD

Major wins
- Beldame Stakes (2008) Matriarch Stakes (2008); UAE Oaks (2008) UAE 1000 Guineas (2008)

Awards
- Chilean Horse of the Year (2008) Chilean Champion Two-Year-Old Filly (2007); Trébol de Plata at Hipódromo Chile (2007) Horse of the Meet (2008 Hollywood Park Autumn Meet)

Cocoa Beach (foaled September 28, 2004) is a notable Chilean-bred retired thoroughbred racehorse and broodmare who was the 2008 Chilean Horse of the Year and won races in the United Arab Emirates, Chile, and the United States.

== Background ==
Cocoa Beach was bred by Haras La Obra, sired by Doneraile Court, out of the mare Visionera, half-sister to the dual Chilean G1 winner Poseida.

== Racing career ==
=== 2007: Two-year-old season ===
Cocoa Beach first raced in Chile as a two-year-old, trained by Sergio Inda in all but her last race and owned by Los Tilos. Her first race was an ungraded stakes race at Club Hípico de Santiago, which she won by four and a half lengths. She followed this up with three consecutive G3 wins at Hipódromo Chile, running as the favorite in every race and winning the last two by 9 1/4 and 9 3/4 lengths, respectively. These earned her the distinction of the 'Trébol de Plata', awarded to horses that win three consecutive races at Hipódromo Chile within one year. Cocoa Beach was named the 2007 Chilean Champion Two-Year-Old Filly.

=== 2008: three-year-old season ===
Cocoa Beach was sold to Godolphin and exported to the United Arab Emirates in late 2007, purchased by head of Godolphin Sheikh Mohammad Bin Rashid Al Maktoum as a gift for his then-wife Princess Haya bint Hussein. After finishing second to Fiesta Lady in her first race in the United Arab Emirates, Cocoa Beach won the UAE 1000 Guineas by 5 1/4 lengths, beating Fiesta Lady. Cocoa Beach also won the UAE Oaks in her last race under the name of HRH Princess Haya bint Hussein before finishing third in the G2 UAE Derby.

=== 2008/2009: four-year-old season ===
The rest of Cocoa Beach's racing career was spent in the United States, where she first raced in August of 2008 in her first race as a four-year-old, winning the Love Sign Stakes at Saratoga. Cocoa Beach then won the G1 Beldame Stakes at Belmont Park, running down favorite Ginger Punch to win by a half length. Her first defeat in the United States was in the G1 Breeders Cup Ladies Classic at Santa Anita Park, where she finished second to the unbeaten Zenyatta by one and a half lengths. In her final race of 2008, Cocoa Beach ran in the G1 Matriarch Stakes, her first race on turf since her debut. The field was considered strong, including the previous year's winner Precious Kitten and G1 winners Black Mamba and Magical Fantasy. Starting as the favorite, Cocoa Beach won the race by three-quarters of a length. After the win, she was given a break, with plans to return in May of 2009. The win earned her the title of Horse of the Meet for the Hollywood Park Autumn Meet.

Cocoa Beach was named the 2008 Chilean Horse of the Year and was rated at 119 (54 kilograms) in the World Thoroughbred Rankings for horses three-year-old and older.

An injury delayed Cocoa Beach's first 2009 race until June, when she finished fourth of four as the overwhelming favorite in the Floral Park Heatherton Stakes, coming out of the race stiff.

=== 2009: five-year-old season ===
Officially turning five on August 1, Cocoa Beach was entered in the G1 Go For Wand Handicap, but was scratched by trainer Saeed bin Suroor. Her five-year-old debut ended up instead being the ungraded De La Rose Stakes on the turf three days later, which she won by a neck. Coming out of the race well, Cocoa Beach next ran in the G2 Ballston Spa Handicap. She went off as the second choice and finished fourth after stalking a slow pace. Returning to Santa Anita Park for the G1 Lady's Secret Stakes and ridden by Richard Migliore for the first time, Cocoa Beach finished third to Zenyatta and Lethal Heat. Cocoa Beach trained well leading up to the G1 Breeders' Cup Ladies Classic, but weakened in the final stretch of the race to finish 6th.

== Racing statistics ==
Cocoa Beach's Career Statistics
Date	Age	Distance	Surface	Race	Grade	Track	Odds	Time	Field	Finish	Margin	Jockey	Trainer	Owner	Ref
Jan 12, 2007	2	1000 meters	Turf	Premio El Debut Potrancas	Ungraded Stakes	Club Hípico de Santiago	7.50	0:58.48	15	1	4 1/2 lengths	N. Inda	Sergio Inda M.	Los Tilos	
Mar 17, 2007	2	1200 meters	Dirt	Gran Premio Seleccion de Potrancas	3	Hipódromo Chile	2.30*	1:13.14	9	1	1 length	N. Inda	Sergio Inda M.	Los Tilos	
Apr 14, 2007	2	1300 meters	Dirt	Gran Premio Juan Cavieres Mella	3	Hipódromo Chile	2.60*	1:19.12	9	1	9 1/4 lengths	N. Inda	Sergio Inda M.	Los Tilos	
Jun 2, 2007	2	1500 meters	Dirt	Gran Premio José Saavedra Baeza	3	Hipódromo Chile	1.30*	1:29.75	8	1	9 3/4 lengths	N. Inda	José Alvarez D.	Los Tilos	
Jan 17, 2008	3	1400 meters	Dirt	Al Haarth Stakes	Conditions Race	Nad Al Sheba Racecourse		1:25.11	14	2	(3 1/4 lengths)	Ted Durcan	Saeed bin Suroor	HRH Princess Haya Of Jordan	
Feb 8, 2008	3	1600 meters	Dirt	UAE One Thousand Guineas	Listed Stakes	Nad Al Sheba Racecourse		1:37.68	12	1	5 1/4 lengths	Ted Durcan	Saeed bin Suroor	HRH Princess Haya Of Jordan	
Feb 28, 2008	3	1800 meters	Dirt	UAE Oaks	Listed Stakes	Nad Al Sheba Racecourse		1:49.09	10	1	1 1/4 lengths	Ted Durcan	Saeed bin Suroor	HRH Princess Haya Of Jordan	
Mar 29, 2008	3	1800 meters	Dirt	UAE Derby	2	Nad Al Sheba Racecourse		1:48.60	10	3	(8 lengths)	Ted Durcan	Saeed bin Suroor	Godolphin Racing LLC	
Aug 29, 2008	4	1 1/8 miles	Dirt	Love Sign Stakes	Listed Stakes	Saratoga	0.60*	1:51.50	7	1	5 lengths	Ramon Domingeuz	Saeed bin Suroor	Godolphin Racing LLC	
Sep 27, 2008	4	1 1/8 miles	Dirt	Beldame Stakes	1	Belmont Park	2.55	1:49.50	4	1	1/2 length	Ramon Domingeuz	Saeed bin Suroor	Godolphin Racing LLC	
Oct 24, 2008	4	1 1/8 miles	Dirt	Breeders' Cup Ladies Classic	1	Santa Anita Park	7.80	1:46.85	8	2	(1 1/2 lengths)	Ramon Domingeuz	Saeed bin Suroor	Godolphin Racing LLC	
Nov 30, 2008	4	1 mile	Turf	Matriarch Stakes	1	Hollywood Park	1.90*	1:35.49	8	1	3/4 length	Ramon Domingeuz	Saeed bin Suroor	Godolphin Racing LLC	
Jun 21, 2009	4	1 1/16 miles	Dirt	Floral Park Heatherten Stakes	Ungraded Stakes	Santa Anita Park	0.15*	1:44.10	4	4	(3 3/4 lengths)	Ramon Domingeuz	Saeed bin Suroor	Godolphin Racing LLC	
Aug 5, 2009	5	1 mile	Turf	De La Rose Stakes	Ungraded Stakes	Saratoga	0.75*	1:34.95	9	1	Neck	Ramon Domingeuz	Saeed bin Suroor	Godolphin Racing LLC	
Aug 29, 2009	5	1 1/16 miles	Turf	Ballston Spa Handicap	2	Saratoga	2.55	1:47.25	7	4	(1 1/4 lengths)	Ramon Domingeuz	Saeed bin Suroor	Godolphin Racing LLC	
Oct 10, 2009	5	1 1/16 miles	Dirt	Lady's Secret Stakes	1	Santa Anita Park	5.10	1:42.89	7	3	(1 1/4 lengths)	Richard Migiliore	Saeed bin Suroor	Godolphin Racing LLC	
Nov 6, 2009	5	1 1/8 miles	Dirt	Breeders' Cup Ladies Classic	1	Santa Anita Park	9.90	1:48.58	8	6	(8 1/2 lengths)	Richard Migiliore	Saeed bin Suroor	Godolphin Racing LLC	

An asterisk after the odds means Cocoa Beach was the post time favorite.

== Retirement and broodmare career ==
After the 2009 Breeders' Cup Ladies Classic, Cocoa Beach was retired to join the Godolphin broodmare herd. She is the dam of Imperia, winner of the 2014 G3 Pilgrim Stakes, and the graded stakes placed mare Lido.

== Pedigree ==
Pedigree of Cocoa Beach (CHI), dark bay or brown mare, foaled September 28, 2004
Sire Doneraile Court (USA)	Seattle Slew (USA)	Bold Reasoning (USA)	Boldnesian (USA)
Sire Doneraile Court (USA)	Seattle Slew (USA)	Bold Reasoning (USA)	Reason to Earn (USA)
Sire Doneraile Court (USA)	Seattle Slew (USA)	My Charmer (USA)	Poker (USA)
Sire Doneraile Court (USA)	Seattle Slew (USA)	My Charmer (USA)	Fair Charmer (USA)
Sire Doneraile Court (USA)	Sophisticated Girl (USA)	Stop The Music (USA)	Hail To Reason (USA)
Sire Doneraile Court (USA)	Sophisticated Girl (USA)	Stop The Music (USA)	Bebopper (USA)
Sire Doneraile Court (USA)	Sophisticated Girl (USA)	Close Control (USA)	Dunce (USA)
Sire Doneraile Court (USA)	Sophisticated Girl (USA)	Close Control (USA)	Self Control (USA)
Dam Visionera (CHI)	Edgy Diplomat (USA)	Deputy Minister (CAN)	Vice Regent (CAN)
Dam Visionera (CHI)	Edgy Diplomat (USA)	Deputy Minister (CAN)	Minty Copy (CAN)
Dam Visionera (CHI)	Edgy Diplomat (USA)	Excitable Gal (USA)	Secretariat (USA)
Dam Visionera (CHI)	Edgy Diplomat (USA)	Excitable Gal (USA)	Magazine (USA)
Dam Visionera (CHI)	Spray (CHI)	Roy (USA)	Fappiano (USA)
Dam Visionera (CHI)	Spray (CHI)	Roy (USA)	Adlibber (USA)
Dam Visionera (CHI)	Spray (CHI)	Memsahib (CHI)	Musketeer (USA)
Dam Visionera (CHI)	Spray (CHI)	Memsahib (CHI)	Kamasutra (CHI)
