= Ginger Punch =

American-bred Thoroughbred racehorse

- Sire: Awesome Again
- Grandsire: Deputy Minister
- Dam: Nappelon
- Damsire: Bold Revenue
- Sex: Mare
- Foaled: 2003
- Country: United States
- Colour: Chestnut
- Breeder: Adena Springs
- Owner: Stronach Stables
- Trainer: Robert J. Frankel
- Record: 22: 12-6-2
- Earnings: $3,065,603

Major wins
- First Flight Handicap (2007); Go For Wand Handicap (2007, 2008); Ruffian Handicap (2007); Sunshine Millions Distaff (2008); La Troienne Stakes (2008); Ogden Phipps Handicap (2008); Personal Ensign Handicap (2008); Breeders' Cup wins: Breeders' Cup Distaff (2007)

Awards
- American Champion Older Female Horse (2007)

Ginger Punch (foaled April 23, 2003, in Florida) is an American Thoroughbred racehorse and broodmare. Owned and bred by operations belonging to automotive parts magnate Frank Stronach, she is out of the mare Nappelon and sired by the Canadian-bred Awesome Again, winner of his country's 1997 Queen's Plate and the 1998 Breeders' Cup Classic and who, as a sire, has produced four Breeders' Cup winners including the 2004 World Champion, Ghostzapper.

Trained by Bobby Frankel, Ginger Punch raced in Kentucky in May 2006 at Churchill Downs, where she won her first race. She did not win again until October, when she captured an allowance race at Keeneland Race Course.

== 2007 racing season ==
Ginger Punch made her 2007 debut in April in the Grade II Madison Stakes on the Polytrack surface at Keeneland Race Course and finished second to Ventura, the winner of the 2008 Breeders' Cup Filly & Mare Sprint race under jockey Rafael Bejarano. In May, she won an allowance race at Churchill Downs, then on June 16 at Belmont Park in New York, under jockey David Flores, she finished second by a neck in the 1 1/16-mile Ogden Phipps Handicap.

On July 8, 2007, under regular jockey Rafael Bejarano, Ginger Punch earned the first stakes victory of her career when she won the 7 furlong First Flight Handicap at Belmont Park by five lengths. Three weeks later, at Saratoga Race Course she got her first Grade I win, capturing the 9-furlong Go For Wand Handicap by again by six lengths. On September 30 in the Beldame Stakes, Ginger Punch was sent off as the betting favorite and finished third.

For the annual Breeders' Cup, owner Frank Stronach usually nominates twenty to thirty percent of his large stable of foals, but Ginger Puch had not been one of them. Despite her loss in the Beldame Stakes, trainer Bobby Frankel convinced Stronach to pay the $180,000 supplemental fee in order for her to run in late October's Breeders' Cup Distaff at Monmouth Park. Heavy rains left the Monmouth track in a very muddy condition. Previously, the only time Ginger Punch had ever failed to finish in the top three was on a similarly sloppy track. However, in the race she won a muddy stretch duel with Hystericalady and held off a late charge from third-place finisher Octave to capture the $2 Million Breeders' Cup Distaff. Ginger Punch was named Champion Older Female in the 2007 Eclipse Awards.

== 2008 racing season ==
Having finished either first or second in 18 of her 22 career starts, Ginger Punch continued to race at age five. She made her debut on January 26, 2008, with a 6 ¾ lengths win in the Sunshine Millions Distaff. In the Grade I Apple Blossom Handicap on April 5, she finished third to then-undefeated multiple Grade I winner Zenyatta. On June 14, 2008, she took the Grade I Ogden Phipps Handicap by five or more lengths in a hand ride. On July 26, 2008, she took the Go For Wand Handicap for the second consecutive time, splitting horses for the lead. On August 22, 2008, she outran Lemon Drop Mom to win the Grade I Personal Ensign Handicap by a head bob. Frankel then decided to point his champion mare to the Grade I Beldame Stakes and Breeders' Cup Ladies' Classic to attempt to become the leading female purse winner in North America. However, on a sloppy track at Belmont Park on September 27, Ginger Punch finished a neck behind Cocoa Beach in the $600,000 Beldame Stakes. On October 24, she was fifth in a strong field of eight Grade I winners: Zenyatta, Cocoa Beach, Music Note, Carriage Trail, and Hystericalady (Carriage Trail and Hystericalady were in a dead heat for 4th place) in the Breeders' Cup Ladies' Classic.

Ginger Punch was a finalist for the Eclipse Award's American Champion Older Female Horse for 2008.

== Stud career ==
Ginger Punch was retired to broodmare duties in 2009. She was bred to Bernardini and was sold for $1.6 million to Katsumi Yoshida of Northern Farm in Japan while in foal. In Japan, Ginger Punch has foaled 9 horses as of 2023. Of these, the most successful is Potager, by Deep Impact, who won the Osaka Hai in 2022. Another successful horse Ginger Punch foaled was Rouge Buck, a filly by Manhattan Cafe. Rouge Buck has won several graded races, most notably the Sankei Sho All Comers in 2017 and the Mainichi Okan in 2016.

== Pedigree ==
Pedigree of Ginger Punch
Sire Awesome Again	Deputy Minister	Vice Regent	Northern Dancer
Sire Awesome Again	Deputy Minister	Vice Regent	Victoria Regina
Sire Awesome Again	Deputy Minister	Mint Copy	Bunty's Flight
Sire Awesome Again	Deputy Minister	Mint Copy	Shakney
Sire Awesome Again	Primal Force	Blushing Groom	Red God
Sire Awesome Again	Primal Force	Blushing Groom	Runaway Bride
Sire Awesome Again	Primal Force	Prime Prospect	Mr. Prospector
Sire Awesome Again	Primal Force	Prime Prospect	Square Generation
Dam Nappelon	Bold Revenue	Bold Ruckus	Boldnesian
Dam Nappelon	Bold Revenue	Bold Ruckus	Raise a Ruckus
Dam Nappelon	Bold Revenue	More Revenue	In for More
Dam Nappelon	Bold Revenue	More Revenue	Royal Debra
Dam Nappelon	Sally Go Gray	Wise Exchange	Promised Land
Dam Nappelon	Sally Go Gray	Wise Exchange	Coastal Trade
Dam Nappelon	Sally Go Gray	Surrepitious	Rambunctious
Dam Nappelon	Sally Go Gray	Surrepitious	Angeline's Choice
