= Jostle (horse) =

American-bred Thoroughbred racehorse

- Sire: Brocco
- Grandsire: Kris S
- Dam: Moon Drone
- Damsire: Drone
- Sex: Mare
- Foaled: 1997
- Country: United States
- Colour: Dark Bay
- Breeder: Prestonwood Farm, Inc
- Owner: Fox Hill Farms
- Trainer: John Servis
- Record: 20: 8-5-2
- Earnings: $1,389,932

Major wins
- Demoiselle Stakes (1999); Selima Stakes (1999); Alabama Stakes (2000); Coaching Club American Oaks (2000); Black-Eyed Susan Stakes (2000); Cotillion Handicap (2000); Comely Stakes (2000)
- Last updated on September 19, 2009

Jostle (foaled in 1997 in Kentucky) is an American Thoroughbred racehorse. The daughter of Brocco is probably best remembered for posting a 3-length score in the mile and an eighth Grade II $250,000 Black-Eyed Susan Stakes at Pimlico Race Course on May 19, 2000.

== Assessment ==
In the 2000 International Classification (the forerunner of the World Thoroughbred Racehorse Rankings), Jostle was given a rating of 122, ranking her equal with Spain as the second best three-year-old filly in the world (and the best in America), four pounds below the top-rated French filly Egyptband.
