= Vertigineux =

American-bred Thoroughbred racehorse

- Sire: Kris S.
- Grandsire: Roberto
- Dam: For The Flag
- Damsire: Forlì
- Sex: Mare
- Foaled: 1995
- Country: United States
- Colour: Dark bay/brown
- Breeder: Eric Kronfeld
- Owner: Coolmore Stud
- Trainer: Michael W. Dickinson
- Record: 7: 2–0–0
- Earnings: $60,480

Awards
- Kentucky Broodmare of the Year (2009)
- Last updated on 5 August 2010

Vertigineux (foaled, March 8, 1995 – 2014) was an American Thoroughbred racemare. She is out of the stakes-winning Forlì mare For The Flag, by the outstanding sire Kris S. Her owner is Eric Kronfeld, who bought back Vertigineux for $120,000 (equivalent to $241,000 in 2024) after she failed to meet her reserve at the 1996 Keenland yearling sale. Her name means "breathtaking" or "dazzling" (speed) in French.

During her racing career, she was trained by Michael Dickinson and had a modest career, consisting of two wins on Belmont turf in seven starts.

Vertigineux is best known, however, not for her racing success as a winner, but for her success as a broodmare. She is the dam of two Grade I stakes winners: Balance, by Thunder Gulch, and champion and 2010 American Horse of the Year Zenyatta, by Street Cry. Zenyatta won 19 of 20 career starts, including the Breeders' Cup Classic in 2009 and the Breeders' Cup Ladies' Classic, earning Eclipse honors as American Champion Older Female Horse in 2008, 2009 and 2010. Vertigineux has also produced graded stakes winner Where's Bailey, by Aljabr, who is her first foal, a 2006 Pulpit filly named Treasure Trail, and a 2007 colt named Souper Spectacular by Giant's Causeway. Vertigineux was sold in 2008, to Coolmore Stud with the stipulation that Mr. Kronfeld got to keep the Bernardini foal she was carrying.

In 2009 she produced Eblouissante, a dark bay or brown filly by Darley sire Bernardini. In four starts to date for trainer John Shirreffs, Eblouissante ran seven times with two wins and one second.

For the 2009 breeding season, she was covered by English champion colt Henrythenavigator and produced a filly on 4 March 2010, later named Pressurizing. Pressurizing never raced.

In 2010 she was again covered by Henrythenavigator, producing another filly, Harley Rose, who also never raced. She was barren to Street Cry in 2011. On April 9, 2013, she delivered a bay colt, De Coronado, by Street Cry. De Coronado shipped to Aidan O'Brien for training in 2015. De Coronado ran eleven times with two wins and two thirds.

Vertigineux was honored by the association of Kentucky Thoroughbred Owners and Breeders (KTOB) as "Broodmare of the Year" in April 2009.

The mare died sometime in 2014 due to an acute colic attack. Vertigineux was taken to Hagyard Medical Institute, but she could not be saved. She was covered by Tapit in 2013 after foaling De Coronado, but she failed to get in foal, making De Coronado her last foal.
