= Brocco =

American-bred Thoroughbred racehorse

- Sire: Kris S.
- Grandsire: Roberto
- Dam: Anytime Ms.
- Damsire: Aurelius
- Sex: Stallion
- Foaled: 1991
- Country: United States
- Colour: Chestnut
- Breeder: Meadowbrook Farms
- Owner: Albert R. Broccoli
- Trainer: Randy Winick
- Record: 8: 4-2-0
- Earnings: $1,003,550

Major wins
- Breeders' Cup Juvenile (1993); Santa Anita Derby (1994)
- Last updated on June 14, 2007

Brocco (foaled March 2, 1991 in Florida) is an American Thoroughbred racehorse.

== Background ==
Bred at the LaCroix family's Meadowbrook Farms near Ocala, Brocco was purchased and raced by Albert R. Broccoli, the producer of the iconic James Bond films.

Brocco was out of the mare Anytime Ms. and was a son of Kris S., who sired five Breeders' Cup winners and three Eclipse Award winners. Brocco's grandsire was Roberto, an American-bred champion in England and winner of the 1972 Epsom Derby.

== Racing career ==
Racing in 1993 for his owner in California, the two-year-old Brocco won his first two races. He then scored the biggest win of his career when he upset prohibitive 7-10 favorite Dehere in the Breeders' Cup Juvenile. He ended the 1993 racing season with a second-place finish in December's Hollywood Futurity.

Brocco started four times in 1994. Under regular jockey Gary Stevens, he finished second to songwriter Burt Bacharach's colt Soul of the Matter in the San Felipe Stakes and defeated Tabasco Cat to win the most important race for three-year-olds in CaliforniaL the Grade I Santa Anita Derby. Sent to Churchill Downs in Louisville, Kentucky, he finished fourth behind winner Go For Gin in the Kentucky Derby

== Stud record ==
Retired to stud duty, Brocco currently stands at Lex Stud in Japan and Durham Lodge in Australia. Among his American offspring, millionaire daughter Jostle won a number of stakes races, including the Grade I Coaching Club American Oaks and Alabama Stakes.
