= Hollywood Wildcat =

American-bred Thoroughbred racehorse

- Sire: Kris S.
- Grandsire: Roberto
- Dam: Miss Wildcatter
- Damsire: Mr. Prospector
- Sex: Filly
- Foaled: 1990
- Country: United States
- Colour: Bay
- Breeder: Irving & Marjorie Cowan
- Owner: Irving & Marjorie Cowan
- Trainer: 1) Emmanuel Tortora; 2) Neil D. Drysdale (at 3)
- Record: 21: 12-5-3
- Earnings: US$1,432,160

Major wins
- Debutante Stakes (1992); Melaleuca Stakes (1992); Sorority Stakes (1992); Hollywood Oaks (1993); Del Mar Oaks (1993); Lady's Secret Handicap (1993, 1994); San Clemente Handicap (1993); Gamely Handicap (1994); Little Brianne Stakes (1995) Breeders' Cup wins: Breeder's Cup Distaff (1993)

Awards
- American Champion Three-Year-Old Filly (1993)

Honours
- Calder Race Course Hall of Fame (2002)

Hollywood Wildcat (1990 – June 23, 2012) was an American Thoroughbred racehorse. Bred by and raced by Irving & Marjorie Cowan, her sire was Kris S., an outstanding sire of five Breeders' Cup winners. Her dam, Miss Wildcatter, was a daughter of Mr. Prospector, a nine-time Leading broodmare sire in North America.

Trained by Emmanuel Tortora, at age two Hollywood Wildcat won her first four starts until an injury in September ended her 1992 racing campaign. After going winless in her first five starts of 1993, Hollywood Wildcat's owners sent her to the California stables of their trainer Neil Drysdale. She promptly won four straight important stakes races then made it five with a win in the Breeders' Cup Distaff, defeating such stars as Paseana and Sky Beauty. Hollywood Wildcat's 1993 performances earned her American Champion Three-Year-Old Filly honors.

Sent back to racing at age four, Hollywood Wildcat made six starts, winning twice, finishing second twice, third once and sixth in her attempt to win a second Breeders' Cup Distaff. Her most important win in 1994 was the Grade 1 Gamely Handicap at Hollywood Park Racetrack. At age five, Hollywood Wildcat made five starts with a single win in the Little Brianne Stakes at Santa Anita Park.

In 2002, Hollywood Wildcat was inducted in the Calder Race Course Hall of Fame.

== Breeding record ==
Hollywood Wildcat was retired from racing in 1995 and began broodmare duty the following year. She was bred to high-profile stallions such as Danehill, Danzig, Storm Cat, and Giant's Causeway from whom she produced nine foals. Among them was Ivan Denisovich, a son of Danehill and a winner of the 2005 July Stakes at England's Newmarket Racecourse. In the United States, her colt War Chant, by Danzig, won the 2000 Breeders' Cup Mile and had career earnings of more than $1.1 million.

In 2012, Hollywood Wildcat died at the Oak Tree Division of Lane's End Farm in Lexington, Kentucky. Her last foal was born in 2010.
