= Music Note =

American-bred Thoroughbred racehorse

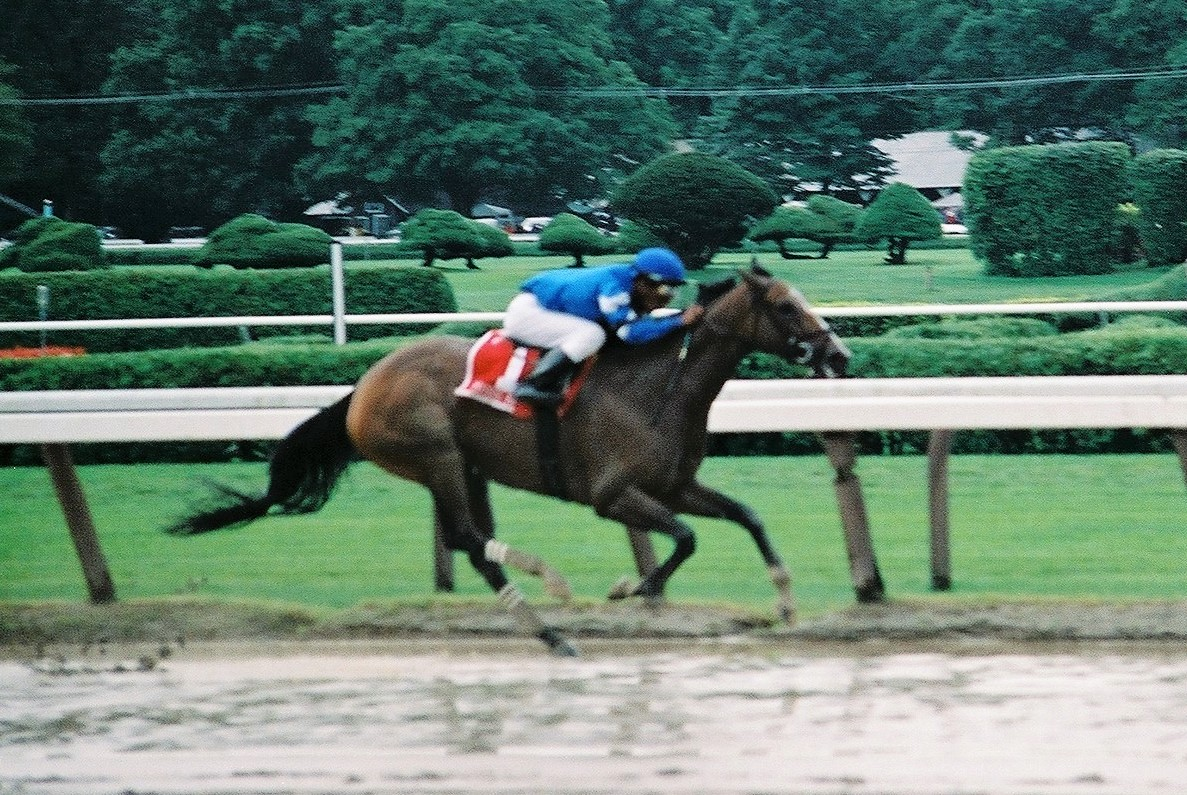
- Music Note winning the 2009 Ballerina Stakes
- Sire: A.P. Indy
- Grandsire: Seattle Slew
- Dam: Note Musicale
- Damsire: Sadler's Wells
- Sex: Mare
- Foaled: February 5, 2005 (age 21)
- Country: United States
- Colour: Bay
- Breeder: Gainsborough Farm
- Owner: Godolphin Racing
- Trainer: Saeed bin Suroor
- Record: 12: 7-1-2
- Earnings: US$1,615,000

Major wins
- Mother Goose Stakes (2008); Coaching Club American Oaks (2008); Gazelle Stakes (2008); Ballerina Stakes (2009); Beldame Stakes (2009)

Music Note (born February 5, 2005, in Kentucky) is a retired American Thoroughbred racehorse who was a five-time Grade I stakes winner. At age three, she won the Gazelle, Mother Goose and Coaching Club American Oaks, then finished third to Zenyatta in the Breeders' Cup Ladies Classic. In 2009, she won the Ballerina and Beldame Stakes, and then again finished third in the Ladies Classic. She finished with career earnings of over $1.6 million.

== Background ==
Music Note is a bay mare who was bred in Kentucky by Gainsborough Farm, the American breeding arm of Godolphin Racing. She raced for Godolphin and was originally trained by Tom Albertrani before being switched to Saeed bin Suroor in 2008. She was sired by A.P. Indy, who was the 1991 American Horse of the Year and subsequently a leading sire. She was produced by the unraced mare Note Musicale, who was by leading Irish stallion Sadler's Wells and out of champion It's In the Air. Note Musicale also produced French classic winner Musical Chimes.

== Racing career ==
Music Note raced twice at age two, finishing fourth in her debut on October 14, 2007, and winning the next time out on November 1, 2007, in a maiden special weight race at Aqueduct.

=== 2008: three-year-old campaign ===
Music Note had a long layoff before returning in a one-mile allowance race at Belmont Park on May 22, 2008. For the first three-quarters of a mile, she rated in fourth place while racing four-wide around the turn. She took the lead in the stretch and continued to draw away under a hand ride to win by seven lengths.

On June 28, her connections stepped her sharply up in class by entering her in the Grade I Mother Goose Stakes, then considered the first leg of New York's Triple Tiara for fillies. She went off as to 8-5 second choice in a field of four in which the odds-on favorite was Proud Spell, who was coming off an easy win in the Kentucky Oaks. Both Proud Spell and Music Note stumbled at the break, then Proud Spell moved into second place to the inside of pacesetter Never Retreat with Music Note rating three-wide in third. Entering the stretch, Music Note went to the lead while Proud Spell had to check her stride due to a lack of racing room on the rail and fell back to fourth. Proud Spell was then taken to the outside and started to close ground but then swerved sharply, interfering with Never Retreat. Music Note won easily by 3 1/2 lengths over Proud Spell, who was subsequently disqualified to third.

In the absence of Proud Spell, Music Note and her stablemate Little Belle were the odds-on favorites in the Coaching Club American Oaks on July 19. Music Note again rated behind the early pace while racing wide, then moved into contention turning into the stretch. Jockey Javier Castellano urged her forward at the top of the stretch, and Music Note responded by rapidly opening her lead to six lengths in mid-stretch and eleven lengths at the wire. "She has a long, beautiful stride," said Castellano. "She sat just where I wanted her. At the quarter-pole, when I asked her, she just took off."

Moving to Saratoga racecourse in August, bin Suroor considered entering Music Note in the Travers Stakes against colts but ultimately entered her in the Alabama Stakes for fillies, giving her a chance at winning the Triple Tiara. She went off as the 1-2 favorite with Proud Spell at odds of 2-1. Little Belle took the early lead with Proud Spell close behind and Music Note at the back of the tightly bunched field while racing four-wide. Proud Spell took the lead entering the stretch and then held off a sustained drive from Music Note to win by a head. "They both showed their courage, they both dug in," said Larry Jones, the trainer of Proud Spell. "They all had equal shots. Everybody had their chance. That's the way it's supposed to be decided."

Music Note became the overwhelming 1-20 favorite in the Gazelle Stakes on September 13 when her main rival Country Star was scratched after throwing her rider. Music Note broke through the gate prior to the start but recovered and won easily by 8 1/2 lengths. "She did it the right way today," said Castellano. "She was comfortable and relaxed. At the three-eighths pole, she grabbed the bit and she wanted to go. I took care of her today for her next race."

Music Note made her final start of the year in the Breeders' Cup Ladies Classic, held that year at Santa Anita. She was the 9-1 fourth betting choice in a top-notch field of eight headed by the undefeated Zenyatta. Music Note settled at the back of the main pack with Cocoa Beach, trailed only by the late-running Zenyatta. The three horses still trailed the field after three-quarters of a mile but then started to move into contention, with Music Note five-wide around the final turn. Zenyatta circled six wide and surged to the lead in the stretch to win easily over Cocoa Beach. Music Note could not match their acceleration but closed steadily for third, beaten by a total of three lengths.

Music Note was a finalist for the Eclipse Award for Outstanding Three-Year-Old Filly, finishing second to Proud Spell.

=== 2009: four-year-old campaign ===
Music Note was given a long layoff then returned on June 13, 2009, in the Ogden Phipps Handicap. She made a strong move on the turn but flattened out in the stretch and was a well beaten fifth. After the race, she was "a little stiff behind" and was given another layoff.

Music Note returned on August 29 in the Ballerina Stakes over seven furlongs at Saratoga on a sloppy track. The field of five also included multiple Grade I winners Indian Blessing and Informed Decision, who both went off at odds of 7-5. A relative longshot at 6-1, Music Note started at the back of the field then found room on the rail to take the lead on the turn. She continued to open up her lead down the stretch to win by 5 1/4 lengths over Indian Blessing. "She got me [into contention] on her own will," said jockey Rajiv Maragh. "I think that was to our advantage at that point where we weren't eight or nine lengths out of it. When I saw Indian Blessing come alongside of us at the top of the stretch, my filly just started sprinting away."

On October 3, she won the fifth Grade I race of her career, the Beldame Stakes. Going off as the 1-4 favorite in a field of five, she rated in third place down the backstretch then swung wide around the turn. She took the lead at the head of the stretch and continued to open her lead to win by 2 1/4 lengths.

Music Note made her final start in the 2009 Breeders' Cup Ladies Classic on November 6, held at Santa Anita. In Zenyatta's absence, Music Note went off as the 5-2 second choice behind Careless Jewel in a field of eight. Careless Jewel went to the early lead and set a fast early pace. Music Note rated well back in fifth and then sixth, trailing by 12 1/2 lengths after three-quarters of a mile. When Careless Jewel tired, the field bunched turning for home. Music Note finally found racing room in the final furlong to finish third behind Life Is Sweet.

== Retirement and broodmare career ==
Music Note was retired after the 2009 Breeders' Cup, returning to Gainsborough Farm to be a broodmare. She has produced three winners, the most notable of which is Mystic Guide, the winner of the 2021 Dubai World Cup.

== Pedigree ==
Pedigree of Music Note, bay mare, February 5, 2005
Sire A.P. Indy	Seattle Slew	Bold Reasoning	Boldnesian
Sire A.P. Indy	Seattle Slew	Bold Reasoning	Reason to Earn
Sire A.P. Indy	Seattle Slew	My Charmer	Poker
Sire A.P. Indy	Seattle Slew	My Charmer	Fair Charmer
Sire A.P. Indy	Weekend Surprise	Secretariat	Bold Ruler
Sire A.P. Indy	Weekend Surprise	Secretariat	Somethingroyal
Sire A.P. Indy	Weekend Surprise	Lassie Dear	Buckpasser
Sire A.P. Indy	Weekend Surprise	Lassie Dear	Gay Missile
Dam Note Musicale (GB)	Sadler's Wells	Northern Dancer	Nearctic
Dam Note Musicale (GB)	Sadler's Wells	Northern Dancer	Natalma
Dam Note Musicale (GB)	Sadler's Wells	Fairy Bridge	Bold Reason
Dam Note Musicale (GB)	Sadler's Wells	Fairy Bridge	Special
Dam Note Musicale (GB)	It's in the Air	Mr. Prospector	Raise a Native
Dam Note Musicale (GB)	It's in the Air	Mr. Prospector	Gold Digger
Dam Note Musicale (GB)	It's in the Air	A Wind is Rising	Francis S
Dam Note Musicale (GB)	It's in the Air	A Wind is Rising	Queen Nasra (family 4-k)

Music Note is inbred 5S x 4D to Bold Ruler, meaning Bold Ruler appears in the fifth generation of the sire's side of her pedigree (as the sire of Boldnesian) and in the fourth generation of the dam's side.
