= De La Rose Stakes =

- Class: Ungraded
- Location: Saratoga Race Course, Saratoga Springs, New York
- Inaugurated: 2004
- Race type: Thoroughbred

Race information
- Distance: 1 mile
- Surface: Dirt
- Purse: $135,000

The De La Rose Stakes is an American Thoroughbred horse race run annually in late July/early August since 2004 at Saratoga Race Course in Saratoga Springs, New York. An ungraded stakes race, it is open to fillies and mares, 4-years-old and up. The race is run at a distance of one mile on the turf and offers a purse of $70,000 added. In 2025, the event was divided into two divisions, due to the large amount of entries.

The De La Rose Stakes is named for the winner of the 1981 Diana Handicap, De La Rose, winner of the 1981 Eclipse Award for Outstanding Female Turf Horse.

== Records ==
Most wins by a jockey:

- 4 – John R. Velazquez (2005, 2007, 2015, 2026)

Most wins by a trainer:

- 4 – William I. Mott (2004, 2014, 2016, 2024)
- 4 – Chad C. Brown (2018, 2020, 2021, 2023)

Most wins by an owner:

- 2 – Juddmonte Farm (2014, 2020)
- 2 – Live Oak Plantation (2022, 2026)

== Past winners ==
Year	Horse	Jockey	Trainer	Owner	Time
2026	And One More Time	John R. Velazquez	Mark E. Casse	Live Oak Plantation	1:34.36
2025 D2	Ozara (IRE)	Dylan Davis	Miguel Clement	Cheyenne Stable	1:34.25
2025 D1	Deep Satin	José Ortiz	Cherie DeVaux	John D. Gunther & Eurowest Bloodstock Services	1:35.49
2024	Poca Mucha	Jose Lezcano	William I. Mott	Wachtel Stable, Pantofel Stable & Jerold L. Zaro	1:37.45
2023	Technical Analysis	José Ortiz	Chad C. Brown	Klaravich Stables	1:33.98
2022	Our Flash Drive	Dylan Davis	Mark E. Casse	Live Oak Plantation	1:35.42
2021	Regal Glory	José Ortiz	Chad C. Brown	Peter M. Brant	1:34.85
2020	Viadera	Joel Rosario	Chad C. Brown	Juddmonte Farm	1:38.17
2019	Got Stormy	Tyler Gaffalione	Mark E. Casse	Gary Barber & Southern Equine Stable	1:33.15
2018	Uni (GB)	Irad Ortiz Jr.	Chad C. Brown	Michael Dubb, Head Of Plains Parthers, Robert R. LaPenta & Bethlehem Stables	1:40.09
2017	Thundering Sky	Rajiv Maragh	George Weaver	Matthew Schera	1:35.42
2016	Lady Lara (IRE)	Jose Lezcano	William I. Mott	Ben Sangster	1:35.88
2015	Recepta	John R. Velazquez	James R. Toner	Phillips Racing Partnership & Pam Gartin	1:34.02
2014	Filimbi	Joel Rosario	William I. Mott	Juddmonte Farm	1;34.42
2013	Assateague	Luis Saez	Michael R. Matz	Helen C. Alexander, Dorothy Matz & Helen K. Groves	1:34.45
2012	Julie's Love (GB)	Julien Leparoux	H. Graham Motion	Andreas Jacobs	1:34.87
2011	Trix in the City	Shaun Bridgmohan	Richard A. Violette Jr.	Patsy C. Symons	1:34.27
2010	Miss Keller (IRE)	Javier Castellano	Roger Attfield	Three Chimneys Farm	1:34.88
2009	Cocoa Beach	Ramon A. Dominguez	Saeed bin Suroor	Godolphin	1:34.95
2008	Carriage Trail	Edgar Prado	Claude R. McGaughey III	Phipps Stables & Stuart S. Janney III	1:36.63
2007	Fantastic Shirl	John R. Velazquez	Kiaran McLaughlin	Dell Ridge Farm	1:34.33
2006	Asi Siempre	Julien Leparoux	Patrick Biancone	Martin S. Schwartz	1:34.51
2005 D2	Cloak Of Vagueness	Edgar Prado	Philip Hauswald	Steven C. Duncker	1:34.71
2005 D1	Path Of Thunder	John R. Velazquez	Todd A. Pletcher	Michael B. Tabor	1:36.83
2004 D2	Fast Cookie	Cornelio Velásquez	William I. Mott	Stonerside Stable	1:37.31
2004 D1	Personal Legend	Jerry Bailey	Robert Frankel	Edmund A. Gann	1:36.63
