= Zenyatta =

American-bred Thoroughbred racehorse

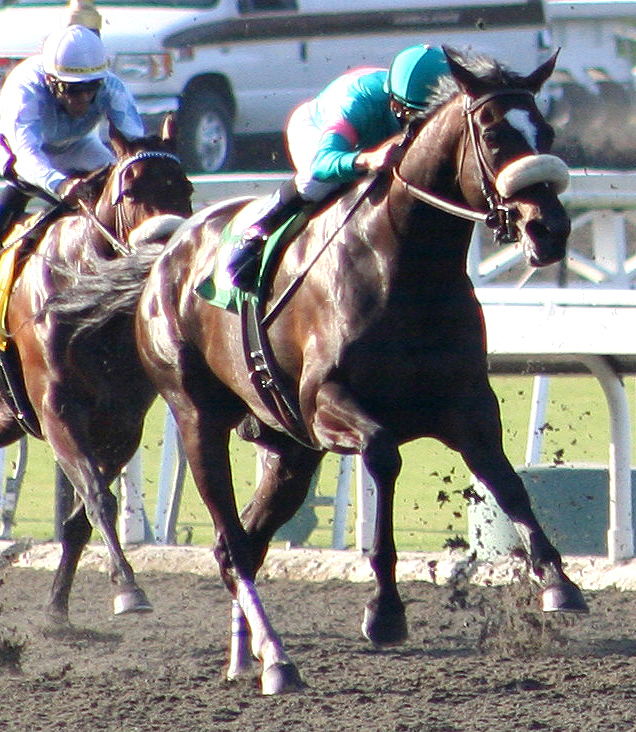
- Zenyatta winning the Lady's Secret Stakes
- Sire: Street Cry
- Grandsire: Machiavellian
- Dam: Vertigineux
- Damsire: Kris S.
- Sex: Mare
- Foaled: April 1, 2004 (age 22); Lexington, Kentucky, U.S.
- Country: United States
- Colour: Dark Bay/Brown
- Breeder: Maverick Productions, Limited
- Owner: Jerry & Ann Moss
- Trainer: John Shirreffs
- Jockey: Mike Smith
- Record: 20: 19–1–0
- Earnings: $7,304,580

Major wins
- El Encino Stakes (2008); Apple Blossom Handicap (2008, 2010); Milady Handicap (2008, 2009); Vanity Handicap (2008, 2009, 2010); Clement L. Hirsch (2008, 2009, 2010); Lady's Secret Stakes (2008, 2009, 2010); Santa Margarita Handicap (2010) Breeders' Cup wins: Breeders' Cup Ladies' Classic (2008); Breeders' Cup Classic (2009)

Awards
- American Champion Older Female Horse (2008, 2009, 2010); American Horse of the Year (2010); Secretariat Vox Populi Award (2010)

Honours
- National Museum of Racing and Hall of Fame inductee (2016); Zenyatta Stakes (2010); NTRA "Moment of the Year" (2008, 2009); Lifesize statue at Santa Anita Park (2012)

Zenyatta (foaled April 1, 2004) is a champion American Thoroughbred racehorse who won the Breeders' Cup Classic and Breeders' Cup Distaff and 19 of her 20 starts. She was the 2010 American Horse of the Year, and Champion Older Female in 2008, 2009, and 2010. She was inducted into the National Museum of Racing and Hall of Fame in 2016.

Zenyatta was purchased as a yearling by record producer Jerry Moss and his wife Ann, who named her after the album Zenyatta Mondatta, by the Police, who were signed to A&M Records by Moss. She went into training with John Shirreffs. A late-developing filly, she did not make her first start until late in her three-year-old year, winning a maiden race in November 2007; this was followed by a win in an allowance race in December. From 2008 through 2010, she recorded seventeen consecutive graded stakes wins, 13 of them at the Grade I level. In 2009, she became the first mare to win the Breeders' Cup Classic. Her other major wins included the Breeders' Cup Ladies Classic in 2008, the Apple Blossom Handicap in 2008 and 2010, consecutive wins in the Vanity Stakes, the Clement L. Hirsch, and the Lady's Secret, all in 2008–2010. The Lady's Secret was subsequently renamed the Zenyatta Stakes in her honor.

Zenyatta developed a passionate following, attracted by a combination of her athletic prowess and her personality. She was known for the "dance moves" she made while in the walking ring and post parade prior to her races, and her taste for Guinness Stout contributed to her popularity. She was also known for her closing finishes, often spotting large leads to early front runners, then overtaking her opponents in the final strides.

== Background ==
Zenyatta is a dark bay mare who was bred in Kentucky by Eric Kronfeld's Maverick Production, Limited. She was sired by Street Cry, who was the 2002 UAE Horse of the Year after winning that year's Dubai World Cup. In addition to Zenyatta, Street Cry also sired 2007 Kentucky Derby-winner Street Sense, Australian Horse of the Year Winx, Australian champion Whobegotyou, and 2009 Melbourne Cup winner Shocking. Zenyatta is out of Vertigineux, and thus is a half-sister to multiple Grade I winner Balance. Vertigineux, a winning daughter of Kris S., was named the 2008 Kentucky Broodmare of the Year.

Zenyatta was sold as a yearling at the 2005 Keeneland September Sale for $60,000 to Jerry and Ann Moss. The relatively low price was the result of a skin disease that broke out a few days before the sale. She was named after the album Zenyatta Mondatta, by The Police, who were signed to A&M Records by Jerry Moss. She was trained by John Shirreffs and guided by jockey Mike Smith for 17 of 20 starts. David Flores rode Zenyatta in her first three starts.

At maturity, Zenyatta's height was reported by various sources at between 17 hands (68 inches, 173 cm) and 17.2 hands (70 inches, 178 cm) at the withers. Her stride was estimated at 26 feet (7.9 m). Her conformation is generally good with a "tremendous" shoulder and hip, but "less than ideal" ankles. During her racing career, she reportedly weighed 1,225 lb (556 kg). Shirreffs was patient while she grew into her large frame. Soon after Zenyatta arrived at his stable, he commented to Dottie Ingordo-Shirreffs, his wife and stable manager, "If I can get her right, she'll be my Michael Jordan."

On the backside, Zenyatta was known as a kind and curious horse with a "Zen-like calm". Before races, she relaxed herself by walking or prancing with an elevated stride, leading to comparisons with dressage horses. "She stretches so much doing all that dancing that she's actually ready to go", said Smith. "You don't have to do a lot with her. She knows that people around her are watching. She knows that she not only has to go out there and compete, but she has the whole package. She's a great entertainer."

== Racing career ==
=== 2007: three-year-old season ===
On November 22, 2007, Zenyatta made her debut in a Maiden Special Weight at a distance of 6 1/2 furlongs over Hollywood Park's artificial track surface. She broke last in a field of twelve and was still in tenth place after half a mile. She swung wide turning into the stretch and drew clear to win by three lengths.

On December 15, Zenyatta made her next start in an allowance race at Hollywood Park over a distance of 1 1/16 miles. She trailed the field for the first half mile, then began to move into position while swinging wide on the final turn. In the stretch, she caught the early leader and drew off to win handily by 3 1/2 lengths.

=== 2008: four-year-old season ===
On January 13, 2008, Zenyatta made her four-year-old debut in the Grade II El Encino Stakes at Santa Anita Park. The field contained Grade I winners Tough Tiz's Sis and Romance is Diane, who both carried 122 pounds. Since Zenyatta had not yet won at the stakes level, she received a six-pound allowance. She broke last in the field of six and was four lengths behind Tough Tiz's Sis, who set a moderate pace of 47.77 seconds for the first half mile. Zenyatta swung wide turning into the stretch and steadily made up ground, drawing clear in the final strides to win by 1 3/4 lengths over Tough Tiz's Sis. "She could be anything, I mean really anything," said Jerry Moss. "We're just so proud of her and enjoying every day with her."

Zenyatta traveled to Oaklawn Park in Arkansas on April 5 for her first start on dirt and her first Grade 1 attempt. It was also the first time she was ridden by Hall of Fame jockey Mike Smith, who rode her for the remainder of her career. She faced champion Ginger Punch, who had won the 2007 Breeders' Cup Ladies Classic and was heavily favored at odds of 2–5. Ginger Punch went to the early lead and set a moderate pace with Zenyatta 9 1/2 lengths back after half a mile. Zenyatta began her move midway on the final turn while swinging four wide. She reached the lead in mid stretch and won going away by 4 1/2 lengths over Brownie Points, with Ginger Punch a further 3 1/2 lengths back in third.

Zenyatta returned to California for her next start at Hollywood Park on May 31 in the Milady Handicap. She broke poorly and was squeezed back but remained fairly closely bunched with the other four horses as Romance is Diane set "turtle-like fractions" of 24.74 seconds for the opening quarter mile and 48.19 for the half. Despite the slow pace, Zenyatta closed strongly down the stretch and drew clear by 2 1/2 lengths under a hand ride. "She always makes everyone look like they stopped," said Ann Moss. "It's like she's out for a gallop and everyone else is stopping."

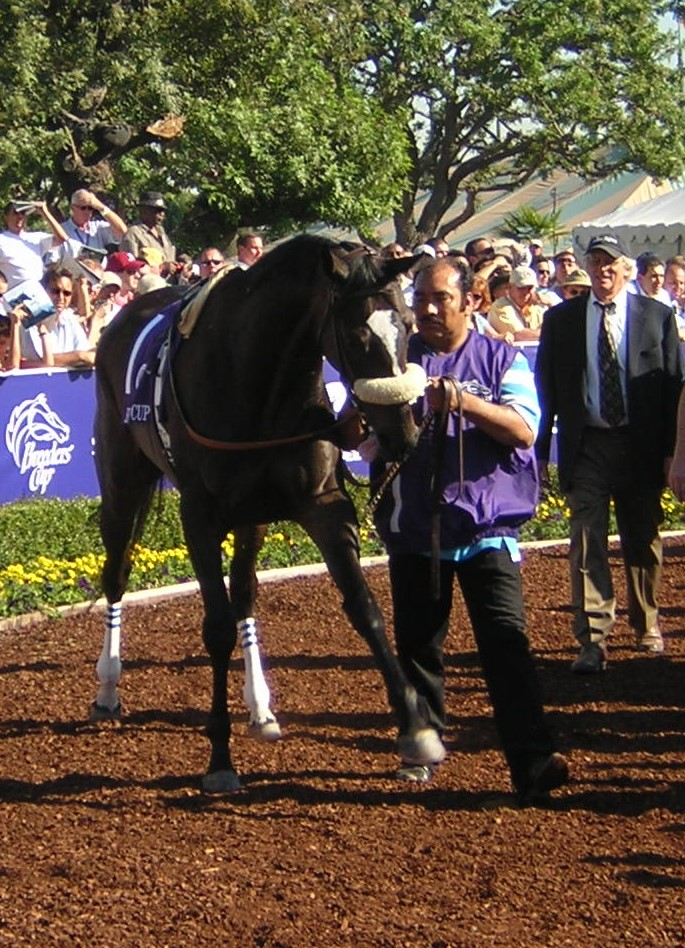
Zenyatta in the walking ring at the 2008 Breeders' Cup, doing her "dance" with a front leg

On July 5, she was entered in the Vanity Handicap at Hollywood Park. She was assigned top weight of 124 pounds, while her main rivals Tough Tiz's Sis and Sealy Hill carried 121 and 118 pounds respectively. Zenyatta made an earlier move than usual and took the lead in mid-stretch, then held off Tough Tiz's Sis to win by half a length. Smith felt Zenyatta had not been at her best. "She was not tested at all, but I was tested,” he said. "She was just pulling [herself] up the whole time. Around the turn, she was pricking her ears. She was not even running. She was basically galloping through the stretch. She made me work hard, but she was just loafing."

On August 2, she was entered in the Clement L. Hirsch Handicap at Del Mar. She again carried top weight of 124 pounds, spotting her seven rivals from five to twelve pounds. She trailed early behind a fast pace and was eleven lengths behind after half a mile. She began making up ground around the far turn and moved to the lead in the final sixteenth of a mile to win by a length, setting a track record of 1:41.48 for 1 1/16 miles.

On September 27, Zenyatta entered the Lady's Secret Stakes at Santa Anita Park. Her main rival in the four-horse field was Grade I winner Hystericalady, who came into the race off an eight-length win in the Molly Pitcher. Hystericalady went to the early lead and set a slow early pace. Zenyatta relaxed in fourth place a few lengths behind, then swung wide turning into the stretch. She gained the lead in midstretch and drew off under moderate urging to win by 3 1/2 lengths. She clocked negative splits throughout the race, running each quarter faster than the one before it. Her splits were :24 4/5, :23 4/5, :23 1/5, :22 3/5, with a final sixteenth in :06 flat. She finished the 1 1/16 miles in a stakes-record 1:40.30 and established herself as the heavy favorite for the Breeders' Cup Ladies' Classic in October.

On October 24, 2008, Zenyatta was sent off as the 1–2 favorite for the Breeders' Cup Ladies' Classic, held during the Oak Tree meeting at Santa Anita. The field included four other horses who had won at the Grade I level in 2008: Ginger Punch (who had won the Ogden Phipps and Go For Wand Handicaps since losing to Zenyatta in the Apple Blossom), Carriage Trail (Spinster Stakes), Cocoa Beach (Beldame) and Music Note (Gazelle Stakes). Zenyatta dropped back at the start behind a moderate pace set by Bear Now. Still 7 1/2 lengths behind after three-quarters of a mile, she started to make up ground on the final turn. She circled the field at the top of the stretch and won by 1 1/2 lengths over Cocoa Beach. Her time of 1:46.85 for 1 1/8 miles was the second-fastest in the race's history.

"Today, she was just showing off," said Smith. "Used to be, she'd get nervous and sweaty when the people were hollering at her. Today, she just started dancing when they did that. She's just figured it out."

With a perfect record of seven wins in 2008, all at the Grade I or II level, Zenyatta was the easy winner of the Eclipse Award for Champion Older Female Horse. She finished second in the voting for Horse of the Year to Curlin, who had won five of his seven starts. Her win in the Ladies Classic was named the NTRA Moment of the Year.

=== 2009: five-year-old season ===
Zenyatta was given a layoff after the Breeders' Cup, then resumed training in February. She was expected to make her five-year-old debut on May 1, 2009, in the Louisville Distaff at Churchill Downs. However, she was scratched from the race after heavy rains made the track sloppy.

Instead, she made her first start of the year on May 23, 2009, in the Milady Handicap at Hollywood Park. She was assigned the top weight of 126 lbs, conceding four pounds to stablemate Life is Sweet, who was also a Grade I winner, and up to 14 pounds to the other horses in the field of six. Behind a moderate pace, Zenyatta dropped to the back of the pack, trailing by twelve lengths after half a mile. She started her move on the far turn and was forced to briefly check. Smith swung Zenyatta wide, and she took the lead with a sixteenth of a mile remaining to win by 1 3/4 lengths over Life Is Sweet. Smith explained that he and Garrett Gomez, the jockey of Life is Sweet, "played some games" while battling for position on the turn. "It was all clean and fair. She's so handy that when I eased up on the pedal, she backed up for me, came around and it was over."

On June 27, Zenyatta faced five rivals in the Vanity Handicap at Hollywood Park. She carried 129 lbs, while Grade II winners Dawn After Dawn and Briecat carried 114 and 116 pounds respectively. Briecat went to the early lead and set moderate fractions. Zenyatta rated 6 1/2 lengths behind down the backstretch, then moved wide to take the lead in the stretch. She won by 2 1/2 lengths over Briecat in a time of 1:48.15 for 1 1/8 miles. "It was a short field and she had a lot of weight on her and I didn't want her to have so much to do, so I stayed a little closer than normal," said Smith. "But when I asked her, she lengthened her stride and it was pretty much over then."

On August 9, Zenyatta faced a field of six in the Clement L. Hirsch, now run as a stakes race under allowance weight conditions. She and Life is Sweet both carried 123 pounds, with the other fillies and mares carrying 119 pounds. Lethal Heat went to the early lead and set a very slow pace of :48.84 for the half mile and 1:13.64 for the three-quarters. Zenyatta was still last at that point with 6 1/2 lengths to make up on the relatively fresh front runners. With a furlong left to run, she still had 4 1/2 lengths to make up but closed to win by a head over Anabaa's Creation.

Because of the slow early pace, she completed the 1 1/16 miles in 1:43.24, nearly two seconds slower than her time in the previous year's race. However, she had run the final quarter in an excellent 22.49 seconds, hitting a speed of roughly 40 miles per hour. Smith admitted that he had underestimated the rest of the field while focused on tracking Life is Sweet, who finished fourth. "But then I looked up and the competition had gotten away from both of us. I just kind of flagged (Zenyatta) with the stick and she started hitting that stride."

On October 10, Zenyatta again faced off with Life is Sweet, Lethal Heat, and Cocoa Beach in the Lady's Secret Stakes at Oak Tree at Santa Anita. Behind another slow early place, she stayed closer to the early leaders this time. She took the lead in deep stretch and pulled clear to win by 1 1/4 lengths under a hand ride. This extended her winning streak to thirteen, tying her with Personal Ensign for the longest undefeated record at the elite level in North American racing history. Smith said she had several gears to spare despite the ease of her victory. "She has an amazing turn of foot," he said, "one that I've never seen before. No disrespect to the other horses today, but she only ran about four jumps when we turned for home and then she shut it down."

==== Breeders' Cup Classic ====
On November 7, Zenyatta's connections opted to enter her against male horses in the 2009 Breeders' Cup Classic at Santa Anita Park instead of trying to defend her title in the Ladies' Classic. Life is Sweet confirmed the quality of Zenyatta's west coast opposition by winning the latter race by 2 1/2 lengths. Meanwhile, Zenyatta faced a deep field of twelve in the Classic. The Polytrack racing surface was a factor in the betting on the race: some horses that ran well on natural dirt did not adapt well to synthetic surfaces, whereas some turf-based horses handled it very well. European-based horses had run one-two in the 2008 Classic, and two Group One winners, Rip Van Winkle and Twice Over, were among the favorites in the 2009 version. The North America contenders included three-year-olds Mine That Bird (Kentucky Derby winner) and Summer Bird (Belmont Stakes, Travers Stakes, and Jockey Club Gold Cup winner). Among the older horses in the race, Gio Ponti, (Arlington Million and Man o' War Stakes winner), was highly regarded, as were Einstein (Santa Anita Handicap winner), Colonel John (Grade I winner, second in the Awesome Again Stakes), and Richard's Kid (Pacific Classic Stakes winner).

Zenyatta caused a brief delay before allowing herself to be loaded in the starting gate. As she started to settle, Quality Road bucked and reared in the outside stall before breaking through the barrier. Quality Road was scratched while all the other horses were unloaded and reloaded. When the race began, Zenyatta was flat footed and trailed the field by 15 1/4 lengths after the first quarter, run by pacesetter Regal Ransom in a leisurely 24.16 seconds. She was still 9 lengths behind after three-quarters of a mile but began making up position while racing just off the rail around the final turn. Still in ninth and 6 3/4 lengths back with a quarter mile remaining, Smith swung her to the outside for racing room. Zenyatta accelerated and rapidly gained ground, then pulled clear to win by a length over Gio Ponti.

Track announcer Trevor Denman had kept an eye on the mare throughout the race, noting she had a lot of work to do at the top of the stretch. As she moved to the lead, he exclaimed, "Zenyatta is flying on the grandstand side! This. Is. Un-be-lievable! What a performance, one we'll never forget!"

Zenyatta was given a hero's welcome on her return to the winner's circle, with many fans holding signs honoring "Queen Z." Ann Moss said, "Every moment with her is just a pleasure. And she's so feminine. She's just dancing and strutting and enjoying her beautiful, majestic self. And that's a gift." Zenyatta became the first mare to win the Breeders' Cup Classic and also the first horse to win two different Breeders' Cup races. "She's a freak, what can I say?" said Gio Ponti's trainer, Christophe Clement. "My horse ran a great race, but he couldn't beat her." "I believe if there was another horse ahead of Gio Ponti," said Smith, "she would have caught him, too. She still had run left."

The win set up a spirited debate over who should be Horse of the Year: Zenyatta or the three-year-old filly Rachel Alexandra. Both were undefeated that year. Zenyatta had won the Breeders' Cup Classic while beating the strongest field of older males that year. However, Rachel Alexandra won the Kentucky Oaks, the filly equivalent of the Kentucky Derby, and then beat males in the Preakness Stakes, becoming the first filly to win that race since 1924. She also won the Haskell Invitational and the Woodward Stakes. As a result, Rachel Alexandra won the balloting by 130 votes to Zenyatta's 99.

On December 22, Zenyatta was runner-up to tennis player Serena Williams for 2009 Associated Press Female Athlete of the Year. The Oak Tree racing association announced that they would rename the Lady's Secret Stake in her honor.

On December 26, opening day of the 75th year of the Santa Anita meet, Zenyatta jogged around the grandstand in what was then thought to be the final racetrack appearance of her career.

=== 2010: six-year-old season ===
The Mosses initially had intended to retire Zenyatta after the Classic but announced on January 16, 2010, that she would remain in training. On January 18, Zenyatta won her second Eclipse Award as American Champion Older Female Horse of the 2009 season.

Since the middle of 2009, attempts had been made to have Rachel Alexandra and Zenyatta face each other directly on the racetrack. On February 5, Oaklawn Park announced that it would increase the purse of the Apple Blossom to $5 million if both horses entered the race. Oaklawn also changed the distance of the race to 1 1/8 miles and made it an invitational event for the 2010 running. Both sets of connections indicated their intention to attend if their horses were in top form.

On March 13, Zenyatta made her six-year-old debut in the Santa Margarita Invitational Handicap at Santa Anita Park. She was assigned 127 lbs and spotted her seven rivals 11 to 16 pounds. She wove through traffic mid-stretch to get clear and won under a hand ride, eased before the wire. She completed the 1 1/8 miles in 1:48.20 and won by 1 1/4 lengths. On the same day, Rachel Alexandra, who had not run since September 2009, was defeated in the New Orleans Ladies Stakes at Fair Grounds Race Course. It was later announced that she would not run in the Apple Blossom. The two horses never met.

With the purse reverting to $500,000, the Apple Blossom attracted a field of five, with Zenyatta the overwhelming favorite at 1-20. She made her usual move on the final turn and coasted to a 4 1/2-length win. She completed the 1 1/8 miles in 1:50.71. Her record of sixteen consecutive wins matched Cigar, Mister Frisky, and Citation for the longest winning streak for North American horses in races not restricted to state-breds.

On June 13, 2010, Zenyatta won her 17th straight race in the Vanity Handicap at Hollywood Park by half a length under 129 pounds. Still in last place at the head of the stretch, she was at first unable to close ground on St. Trinians, to whom she conceded 9 pounds. Smith noted that although Zenyatta had "hit a real big gear" in the stretch, St. Trinians had responded in kind. "I said, Whoa, [St. Trinians] is serious. She's going to make me run. I was working at it until the last 100 yards and then I knew I'd outgrind her." With the win, Zenyatta surpassed the records of Citation and Cigar for consecutive victories in unrestricted races. She also tied the world record set by Rock of Gibraltar for consecutive Grade/Group I victories.

On August 7, Zenyatta was the 1-10 favorite in the Clement L. Hirsch at Del Mar. The pace was very slow – :25.41 for the first quarter-mile and :50.61 for the half. Zenyatta started her move on the turn and hit the lead earlier than usual. Although she was never hard pressed, she won by only a neck. "She was literally playing," said Smith. "I hit the button a little too soon. When she gets in front, she thinks its over. She wants to salute the fans."

The win broke the world record set by Rock of Gibraltar for consecutive Grade/Group I victories. It also tied Eclipse for consecutive victories without a defeat. With the win, Zenyatta captured her 12th Grade I race and tied the All-time North American record (set by two-time champion Bayakoa) for Grade I victories by a filly/mare.

Shirreffs had considered sending Zenyatta to the east coast for her final prep for the Breeders' Cup. However, he ultimately decided to keep her at home and entered her in the Lady's Secret on October 2 instead (the name change for the race to the Zenyatta Stakes was deferred for a year). The race was held at Hollywood Park because of concerns over the Santa Anita racing surface. Zenyatta broke slowly, took her normal place at the back of the pack, and was 4 1/2 lengths behind after half a mile. She swung to the outside coming off the final turn and gradually took the lead and drew off to win by half a length.

Zenyatta broke the North American record for Grade I victories by a filly/mare with her 13th Grade I win. It was also her ninth consecutive Grade I victory (then a world record, since tied by Frankel, then broken by Winx). In addition, she broke the all-time North American female earnings record (formerly held by Ouija Board).

On November 6, Zenyatta attempted to become the first North American horse to retire undefeated with 20 wins and the second horse to repeat in the Breeders' Cup Classic after Tiznow. She faced one of the strongest fields in the history of the race, including Blame (Stephen Foster Handicap and Whitney Handicap); Lookin at Lucky (Preakness and Haskell Invitational); Quality Road (Metropolitan Handicap, Donn Handicap and Woodward Stakes); Paddy O'Prado (Secretariat Stakes); First Dude (runner-up in the Preakness); Espoir City(Japan Cup Dirt); and Haynesfield (Jockey Club Gold Cup). "I would imagine that when this race was designed, when they came up with the concept in 1982, this is what they had in mind," said trainer Todd Pletcher. "It brings the best horses in the world together, on a neutral playing field, on a traditional dirt surface. We'll see what happens."

Zenyatta had a sluggish start and seemed to struggle with the surface —looking "like a rocking horse," according to The New York Times. After half a mile, she trailed the early leaders by 15 lengths. Around the far turn, she started to make up ground. Blame had also started his move and reached the lead by mid-stretch. Zenyatta was moving fast but faced a wall of horses in front of her. Smith moved her out wide, then made several more adjustments before the mare found running room. In deep stretch, she started to close ground rapidly but came up a neck short. After the race, Smith was in tears, blaming himself for the defeat. "I got away slow and got squeezed out of there," he said. "I couldn't level her off. If you have to blame anyone today, it would be me."

"In defeat she didn't lose anything," said Al Stall Jr, the trainer of Blame. "I don't think you'll find anybody criticizing anything she's ever done, much less today. We were fortunate to have the right horse on the right day at the right time."

With her second-place earnings of $900,000, Zenyatta surpassed Tiznow, John Henry, and Alysheba in all-time North American earnings (male or female) with earnings in excess of $7,304,580. She also broke the all-time Breeders Cup earnings record (previously held by American Horse of the Year and two-time Breeders Cup Classic champion Tiznow). At the time, the top-five Breeders Cup earners were: Zenyatta: $4,680,000, Tiznow: $4,560,400, Goldikova (IRE): $3,508,200, Conduit (IRE): $3,240,000, and Curlin: $2,955,000.

With three Grade I wins in 2010 and the head-to-head victory over Zenyatta, Blame's connections believed he deserved to be named Horse of the Year. Ultimately, that honor went to Zenyatta, with five Grade I wins in 2010. She was also named Champion Older Female Horse while Blame was unanimously named the Champion Older Male Horse.

On December 18, 2010, Zenyatta was runner-up to skier Lindsey Vonn for 2010 Associated Press Female Athlete of the Year.

On January 20, 2011, Penny Chenery announced that Zenyatta was named the 2010 recipient of the Secretariat Vox Populi Award.

On March 23, 2011, Zenyatta became the first horse to win the William H. May Award. The award honors an individual or group that has provided "meritorious service" to the industry. Past recipients include racing industry greats such as John R. Gaines (Breeders' Cup founder), Joe Hirsch (founder of the National Turf Writers Association), Bob and Beverly Lewis, Stanley Bergstein, and Richard Duchossois.

=== Competition ===
In her narrow defeat to Blame at Churchill Downs on a traditional dirt surface, she overcame many doubts over competition as the 2010 Classic was considered one of the deepest fields in its history with seven Grade I winners. Zenyatta defeated two champions in the 2009 Breeders' Cup Classic (Gio Ponti and Summer Bird), champion Ginger Punch in the 2008 Breeders' Cup Ladies Classic, and Canadian champion Sealy Hill in the 2008 Vanity. Other Grade I/Group One winners that she defeated included: Colonel John; Richard's Kid; Einstein; Tough Tiz's Sis; Cocoa Beach; Music Note; Life Is Sweet; Switch; Rip Van Winkle; Twice Over; Awesome Gem; Girolamo; Mine That Bird; Hystericalady; Romance Is Diane; Double Trouble; Santa Teresita; and Carriage Trail.

== Breeding career ==
Zenyatta in retirement at Lane's End Farm.

On November 17, 2010, Zenyatta was retired from racing to become a broodmare. She arrived at Lane's End Farm in Versailles, Kentucky on December 6, 2010 and has been based there throughout her breeding career.

In 2011, she was bred to Bernardini. She was announced to be in foal after two coverings. The ensuing foal, born March 8, 2012, was a dark bay colt named Cozmic One. He made two starts in 2015 and performed poorly at the track. He was subsequently retired and in 2018 became an ambassador for the Retired Racehorse Project after training at De Sousa Stables as a show jumper.

In 2012, Zenyatta was bred to Tapit. She delivered a chestnut colt named Ziconic on April 1, 2013, her 9th birthday. Ziconic began his racing career in 2016, and like his dam he demonstrated a come-from-behind running style. He was winless in twelve starts, although he finished second twice and third six times. On June 12, 2019, it was announced that Ziconic was retired from racing and would retrain as an eventer.

In 2013, Zenyatta was confirmed in foal to War Front. In 2014, she delivered a dark bay filly nicknamed Z Princess. However, the filly was euthanized as a weanling after an accident in the paddock. Zenyatta received a year off from breeding, and in 2015 she was bred again to War Front. She gave birth to a colt that died four days later due to complications from meconium aspiration syndrome.

Zenyatta was bred to Medaglia d'Oro in 2016 and delivered a bay filly on May 9, 2017. The filly was named Zellda and was placed into training with John Shirreffs in 2019. She never raced.

Zenyatta was next bred to Into Mischief on June 3, 2017, and confirmed in foal in July. She lost the pregnancy in April 2018 following a placental abruption and was not bred again in 2018 to give her time to recover.

Zenyatta was bred in 2019 to Candy Ride and produced a chestnut filly on May 17, 2020. The filly was named Zilkha. Zenyatta was then rebred to Candy Ride, but it was announced later that she had lost that foal.

In June 2023, after Zenyatta delivered a War Front filly, Lane's End retired her as a broodmare.

== Racing statistics ==
Date	Age	Distance	Race	Grade	Track	Surface	Odds	Field	Finish	Winning Time	Winning (Losing) Margin	Jockey	Ref
Nov 22, 2007	3	6 1/2 furlongs	Maiden Special Weight		Hollywood Park	All weather	5.50	12	1	1:15.22	3 lengths	David Flores	
Dec 15, 2007	3	1 1/16 miles	Allowance		Hollywood Park	All weather	1.20*	7	1	1:40.97	3 1/2 lengths	David Flores	
Jan 13, 2008	4	1 1/16 miles	El Encino Stakes	II	Santa Anita Park	All weather	1.20*	6	1	1:40.61	1 3/4 lengths	David Flores	
Apr 5, 2008	4	1 1/16 miles	Apple Blossom Handicap	I	Oaklawn Park	Dirt	1.80	6	1	1:42.64	4 1/2 lengths	Mike Smith	
May 31, 2008	4	1 1/16 miles	Milady Handicap	II	Hollywood Park	All weather	0.30*	5	1	1:41.17	2 1/2 lengths	Mike Smith	
July 5, 2008	4	1 1/8 miles	Vanity Handicap	I	Hollywood Park	All weather	0.30*	7	1	1:49.51	1/2 length	Mike Smith	
Aug 2, 2008	4	1 1/16 miles	Clement L. Hirsch Handicap	II	Del Mar	All weather	0.60*	8	1	1:41.48 (Note: New track record)	1 length	Mike Smith	
Sep 27, 2008	4	1 1/16 miles	Lady's Secret Stakes	I	Santa Anita	All weather	0.70*	4	1	1:40.30 (Note: New stakes record)	3 1/2 lengths	Mike Smith	
Oct 24, 2008	4	1 1/8 miles	Breeders' Cup Ladies Classic	I	Santa Anita	All weather	0.50*	8	1	1:46.85	1 1/2 lengths	Mike Smith	
May 23, 2009	5	1 1/16 miles	Milady Handicap	II	Hollywood Park	All weather	0.20*	6	1	1:42.30	1 3/4 lengths	Mike Smith	
June 27, 2009	5	1 1/8 miles	Vanity Handicap	I	Hollywood Park	All weather	0.30*	6	1	1:48.15	2 1/2 lengths	Mike Smith	
Aug 9, 2009	5	1 1/16 miles	Clement L. Hirsch Stakes	I	Del Mar	All weather	0.20*	7	1	1:43.24	Head	Mike Smith	
Oct 10, 2009	5	1 1/16 miles	Lady's Secret Stakes	I	Santa Anita	All weather	0.40*	7	1	1:42.89	1 1/4 lengths	Mike Smith	
Nov 7, 2009	5	1 1/4 miles	Breeders' Cup Classic	I	Santa Anita	All weather	2.80*	12	1 (Note: First filly or mare to win the Breeders Cup Classic. First horse to win two different Breeders Cup races)	2:00.62	1 length	Mike Smith	
March 13, 2010	6	1 1/8 miles	Santa Margarita Invitational Handicap	I	Santa Anita Park	All weather	0.30*	8	1	1:48.20	1 1/4 lengths	Mike Smith	
April 9, 2010	6	1 1/8 miles	Apple Blossom Invitational Stakes	I	Oaklawn Park	Dirt	0.05*	5	1 (Note: Tied the all-time North American record with 16 consecutive victories in unrestricted races (held by Citation and Cigar))	1:50.71	4 1/4 lengths	Mike Smith	
June 13, 2010	6	1 1/8 miles	Vanity Handicap	I	Hollywood Park	All weather	0.50*	6	1 (Note: Broke the all-time North American record with 17 consecutive victories in unrestricted races. First mare to win this race 3 times)	1:49.01	1/2 length	Mike Smith	
Aug 7, 2010	6	1 1/16 miles	Clement L. Hirsch Stakes	I	Del Mar	All weather	0.10*	6	1 (Note: Broke the world record with 8 consecutive Grade/Group I wins. Tied Eclipse with 18 consecutive victories without defeat. First mare to win this race 3 times)	1:45.03	Neck	Mike Smith	
Oct 2, 2010	6	1 1/16 miles	Lady's Secret Stakes	I	Hollywood Park	All weather	0.10*	5	1 (Note: Broke the all-time North American record for Grade I victories by a filly or mare. Tied the all-time North American record for consecutive victories without defeat. Broke the all-time North American female earnings record. First mare to win this race 3× (consecutive years))	1:42.97	1/2 length	Mike Smith	
Nov 6, 2010	6	1 1/4 miles	Breeders' Cup Classic	I	Churchill Downs	Dirt	1.00*	12	2 (Note: Broke the all-time Breeders Cup earnings record (previously held by American Horse of the Year and 2-time Breeders Cup Classic champion Tiznow))	2:02.28	(Head)	Mike Smith	

An asterisk after the odds means Zenyatta was the post-time favorite.

== Popularity ==
Zenyatta was selected three years in a row (2008–2010) for NTRA's Moment of the Year Award, for her 2008 Ladies' Classic victory, historic 2009 Breeders' Cup Classic victory, and narrow defeat in the 2010 Breeders' Cup Classic. She finished second in the voting for AP Female Athlete of the Year in both 2009 and 2010. She was featured in O and W Magazine and in a profile on 60 Minutes in 2010 prior to her historic attempt at 20 consecutive victories in the 2010 Breeders Cup Classic. In a public opinion poll by the Daily Racing Form, 87% of people voted for her to be the 2010 Eclipse Horse of the Year. Thousands appeared for her retirement ceremonies at Hollywood Park and Keeneland Race Track despite frigid 18-degree temperatures at Keeneland.

== Pedigree ==
Pedigree of Zenyatta (USA), dark bay or brown mare, 2004
Sire Street Cry (IRE) 1998	Machiavellian (USA); 1987	Mr. Prospector	Raise a Native
Sire Street Cry (IRE) 1998	Machiavellian (USA); 1987	Mr. Prospector	Gold Digger
Sire Street Cry (IRE) 1998	Machiavellian (USA); 1987	Coup de Folie	Halo
Sire Street Cry (IRE) 1998	Machiavellian (USA); 1987	Coup de Folie	Raise The Standard
Sire Street Cry (IRE) 1998	Helen Street (GB); 1982	Troy	Petingo
Sire Street Cry (IRE) 1998	Helen Street (GB); 1982	Troy	La Milo
Sire Street Cry (IRE) 1998	Helen Street (GB); 1982	Waterway	Riverman
Sire Street Cry (IRE) 1998	Helen Street (GB); 1982	Waterway	Boulevard
Dam Vertigineux (USA) 1995	Kris S. (USA); 1977	Roberto	Hail To Reason
Dam Vertigineux (USA) 1995	Kris S. (USA); 1977	Roberto	Bramalea
Dam Vertigineux (USA) 1995	Kris S. (USA); 1977	Sharp Queen	Princequillo
Dam Vertigineux (USA) 1995	Kris S. (USA); 1977	Sharp Queen	Bridgework
Dam Vertigineux (USA) 1995	For The Flag (USA); 1978	Forli	Aristophanes
Dam Vertigineux (USA) 1995	For The Flag (USA); 1978	Forli	Trevisa
Dam Vertigineux (USA) 1995	For The Flag (USA); 1978	In The Offing	Hoist The Flag
Dam Vertigineux (USA) 1995	For The Flag (USA); 1978	In The Offing	Mrs. Peterkin (family 4-r)

== See also ==
- List of leading Thoroughbred racehorses
- List of racehorses
- Repeat winners of horse races
