= Spain (horse) =

American Thoroughbred racehorse

- Sire: Thunder Gulch
- Grandsire: Gulch
- Dam: Drina
- Damsire: Regal And Royal
- Sex: Filly
- Foaled: 1997
- Country: United States
- Colour: Bay
- Breeder: The Thoroughbred Corp.
- Owner: 1) The Thoroughbred Corp. 2) Dromoland Farm
- Trainer: D. Wayne Lukas
- Record: 35: 9–9–7
- Earnings: US$3,540,542

Major wins
- La Brea Stakes (2000); Monmouth Breeders' Cup Oaks (2000); Turfway Breeders' Cup Stakes (2000); La Cañada Stakes (2001); Louisville Stakes (2002); Fleur de Lis Handicap (2002); Breeders' Cup wins: Breeders' Cup Distaff (2000)

Spain (foaled 1997 in Kentucky) is an American Thoroughbred racehorse who retired as the most financially successful mare in North American racing history in her time.

== Background ==
Bred and raced by Prince Ahmed bin Salman's The Thoroughbred Corp., Spain was out of the winning mare Drina. Her sire was Thunder Gulch, a winner of five Grade I races including the 1995 Kentucky Derby and Belmont Stakes.

Spain was conditioned for racing by U.S. Racing Hall of Fame trainer D. Wayne Lukas.

== Racing career ==
At age two, she made six starts, winning once. At age three, Spain had her best year. She got her first Grade I win in the La Brea Stakes at Santa Anita Park, then capped off her year with a win in the 2000 Breeders' Cup Distaff at Churchill Downs. Given little chance by bettors of defeating notable fillies such as Surfside and the heavily favored Riboletta, Spain was sent off at odds of more than 55:1. Her victory resulted in a winning $2 bet paying $113.80, the second-highest in Breeders' Cup history. For jockey Victor Espinoza, it marked his first Breeders' Cup win.

Spain returned to racing at ages four and five. In 2001, she won the La Cañada Stakes and ran second to Unbridled Elaine in the 2001 Breeders' Cup Distaff. As a five-year-old in 2002, at Churchill Downs, Spain won the Louisville Breeders Cup Handicap and, while in foal to Storm Cat, won the Fleur de Lis Handicap. She was retired after that race having earned a record $3,540,542.

== Assessment ==
In the 2000 International Classification (the forerunner of the World Thoroughbred Racehorse Rankings), Spain was given a rating of 122, ranking her equal with Jostle as the second best three-year-old filly in the world (and the best in America), four pounds below the top-rated French filly Egyptband.

== Breeding record ==
Following the death of Prince Ahmed bin Salman in 2002, Spain was sold to Gerry Dilger of Dromoland Farm in Lexington, Kentucky, for $5.3 million at the November 2003 Keeneland Sales while carrying her second foal by Storm Cat, eventually named Calcaria. During the same auction, Gerry Dilger also paid a North American record price for a weanling colt when he paid $2.4 million for Spain's first foal by Storm Cat, named Carpocrates. For her new owner, Spain produced another foal by Storm Cat in 2005. A colt named Plan, he won in Ireland for owner Michael Tabor before being sold to IEAH Stables, for whom he races in the United States. Plan came in second in his only race in the United States, the grade one Secretariat Stakes. In 2006, Spain produced Dreamtheimpossible by Giant's Causeway. The horse raced at age two in 2008 in Ireland and England for owner Susan Magnier. On May 1, 2017, Spain foaled a colt by Triple Crown winner American Pharoah.
