= Kris S. =

American-bred Thoroughbred racehorse

- Sire: Roberto
- Grandsire: Hail To Reason
- Dam: Sharp Queen
- Damsire: Princequillo
- Sex: Stallion
- Foaled: 1977
- Country: United States
- Colour: Dark bay/brown
- Breeder: Red Oak Farm Inc.
- Owner: Kris S. Robillard
- Trainer: G. James Sacco
- Record: 5: 3-1-0
- Earnings: $53,350

Major wins
- Bradbury Stakes (1980)
- Last updated on September 11, 2008

Kris S. (April 25, 1977 – May 7, 2002) was an American Thoroughbred race horse who is best known as a highly successful sire.

== Background ==
Kris S. was a son of the 1972 Epsom Derby winner Roberto who was a sire of international influence descending from the Hail to Reason branch of the Nearco sire line. Kris S.'s dam was Sharp Queen, a daughter of two-time North American Champion Sire and seven-time Champion Broodmare Sire Princequillo.

== Racing career ==
Kris S. was raced by Kris S. Robillard, whose father bought the horse for her and gave him her name. The colt won two races at age two, but an injury limited his racing career to just five starts, including a win in the ungraded Bradbury Stakes at age three. In 1982 he was sent to stand at stud at Meadowbrook Farms in Florida, where he remained until 1993 when he was moved to Prestonwood Farm (now Winstar Farm) in Versailles, Kentucky.

== Stud record ==
A highly successful stallion, Kris S. sired 63 stakes winners and had lifetime progeny earnings of over $50 million. Among the horses he sired were five Breeders' Cup winners, of which three were voted an Eclipse Award:

- Prized (born 1986) – won 1989 Breeders' Cup Turf, Molson Million
- Hollywood Wildcat (born 1990) – won 1993 Breeders' Cup Distaff, 1993 American Champion Three-Year-Old Filly
- Brocco (born 1991) – won 1993 Breeders' Cup Juvenile and 1994 Santa Anita Derby
- Soaring Softly (born 1995) – won 1999 Breeders' Cup Filly & Mare Turf, 1999 American Champion Female Turf Horse
- Action This Day (born 2001) – won 2003 Breeders' Cup Juvenile, American Champion Two-Year-Old Colt

Kris S. also sired two-time Japanese Horse of the Year Symboli Kris S and the 2003 Epsom Derby winner, Kris Kin. In addition, he sired major stakes winners Rock Hard Ten, Kissin Kris, Machikane Allegro, Dr Fong, Kudos, You and I, Adonis, Class Kris, Evening Kris, Cheval Volant, Stocks Up, and Arch. He also sired Vertigineux, honored by the association of Kentucky Thoroughbred Owners and Breeders (KTOB) as "Broodmare of the Year" in April 2009. Kris S. was also the grandsire of Canadian Three-Year-Old Champion Colt Pender Harbour, a 2011 winner of two of the Canadian Triple Crown races.

Kris S. is the damsire of War Chant, winner of the 2000 Breeders' Cup Mile; Life is Sweet, winner of the 2009 Breeders' Cup Distaff; and Zenyatta, the first mare to win the Breeders' Cup Classic in 2009.

Kris S. was euthanized on May 7, 2002 and was buried at WinStar Farm. His last crop of foals was born the following year.
