= UAE 1000 Guineas =

- Location: Meydan Racecourse; Dubai, United Arab Emirates
- Race type: Thoroughbred – Flat racing
- Website: UAE Racing

The UAE 1000 Guineas is a flat horse race in the United Arab Emirates for three-year-old thoroughbred fillies run at Meydan Racecourse in Dubai in February.

== Records ==
Record time:

- 1:35.84 – Folk (2007)

Leading jockey (4 wins):

- Frankie Dettori – Catstar (2004), Satin Kiss (2005), Gamilati (2012), Soft Whisper (2021)

Leading trainer (12 wins):

- Saeed bin Suroor – Muwakleh (2001), Infinite Spirit (2002), Mezzo Soprano (2003), Catstar (2004), Satin Kiss (2005), Cocoa Beach (2008), Siyaadah (2010), Ihtimal (2014), Local Time (2015), Winter Lightning (2018), Dubai Love (2020), Soft Whisper (2021)

Leading owner (12 wins):

- Godolphin – Infinite Spirit (2002), Mezzo Soprano (2003), Catstar (2004), Satin Kiss (2005), Siyaadah (2010), Gamilati (2012), Lovely Pass (2013), Ihtimal (2014), Local Time (2015), Winter Lightning (2018), Dubai Love (2020), Soft Whisper (2021)

== Winners ==
Year	Winner	Jockey	Trainer	Owner	Time
2001	Muwakleh	Richard Hills	Saeed bin Suroor	Hamdan Al Maktoum	1:35.93
2002	Infinite Spirit	John Carroll	Saeed bin Suroor	Godolphin	1:37.97
2003	Mezzo Soprano	Kerrin McEvoy	Saeed bin Suroor	Godolphin	1:37.55
2004	Catstar	Frankie Dettori	Saeed bin Suroor	Godolphin	1:40.46
2005	Satin Kiss	Frankie Dettori	Saeed bin Suroor	Godolphin	1:39.25
2006	Vague	Mick Kinane	Jeremy Noseda	J Paul Reddam	1:37.83
2007	Folk	Kerrin McEvoy	Ismail Mohammed	Hamdan bin Mohammed Al Maktoum	1:35.84
2008	Cocoa Beach	Ted Durcan	Saeed bin Suroor	Princess Haya Of Jordan	1:37.66
2009	So Shiny	Mick Kinane	Jerry Barton	Sultan Mohammed Saud Al Kabeer	1:39.06
2010	Siyaadah	Ahmed Ajtebi	Saeed bin Suroor	Godolphin	1:37.21
2011	Mahbooba	Christophe Soumillon	Mike de Kock	Mohammed bin Khalifa Al Maktoum	1:36.50
2012	Gamilati	Frankie Dettori	Mahmood al Zarooni	Godolphin	1:38.84
2013	Lovely Pass	Ahmed Ajtebi	Mahmood al Zarooni	Godolphin	1:38.99
2014	Ihtimal	Silvestre de Sousa	Saeed bin Suroor	Godolphin	1:36.64
2015	Local Time	James Doyle	Saeed bin Suroor	Godolphin	1:39.69
2016	Polar River	Pat Dobbs	Doug Watson	Valentin Bukhtoyarov & Evgeny Kappushev	1:37.09
2017	Nashmiah	Mickael Barzalona	Nicholas Bachalard	Sons of the late King Abdulla	1:40.76
2018	Winter Lightning	Pat Cosgrave	Saeed bin Suroor	Godolphin	1:38.19
2019	Silva	Oisin Murphy	Pia Brandt	Zalim Bifov	1:39.62
2020	Dubai Love	Pat Cosgrave	Saeed bin Suroor	Godolphin	1:37.98
2021	Soft Whisper	Frankie Dettori	Saeed bin Suroor	Godolphin	1:38.67
2022	Shahama	Adrie de Vries	Fawzi Abdulla Nass	KHK Racing	1:39.08
2023	Mimi Kakushi	Mickael Barzalona	S bin Ghadayer	Sheikh Hamdan bin Mohammed Al Maktoum	1:39.48

== See also ==
- Road to the Kentucky Oaks
- List of United Arab Emirates horse races
