= StateSide Urbancraft =

American vodka company

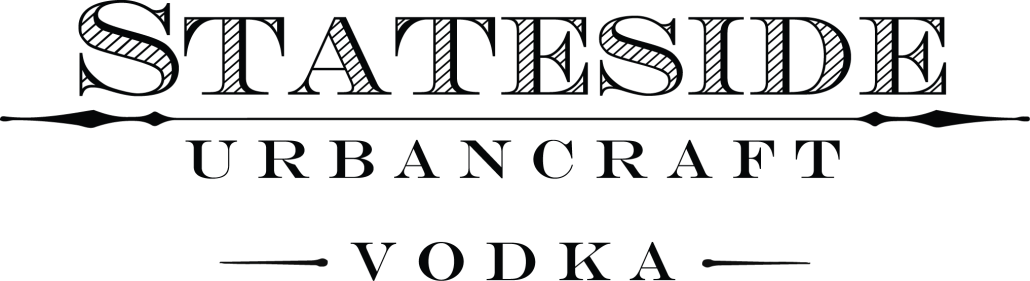
- Company type: Distillery
- Industry: Alcoholic beverages
- Founded: 2015; 10 years ago
- Founders: Matt Quigley, Bryan Quigley
- Headquarters: Philadelphia, United States
- Area served: Pennsylvania
- Products: Vodka, Bourbon, Hard iced tea, Hard seltzer
- Website: www.statesidevodka.com

StateSide Urbancraft is a vodka company located in Philadelphia, Pennsylvania that originated as a passion project between two brothers distilling vodka in their basement. The company has expanded to include hard seltzer and hard iced tea as well as bourbon.

== History ==
StateSide Urbancraft started as a passion project by two brothers Matt and Bryan Quigley who, in 2013, while in high school, decided to start distilling Vodka in their basement out of a homemade still made out of an old keg and chemistry lab equipment. When their father found the homemade still, he thought that the pair where making drugs and kicked them out of the house. The two then landed a distilling fellowship at the Michigan State University and consulting jobs at a Polish distillery before founding their own company in 2015 with the desire to fill the niche of domestic American vodka.

StateSide Urbancraft vodka is known for its swing-top bottles, and the fact that each batch is blessed by an in-house rabbi. A portion of all proceeds from StateSide vodka is donated to various progressive causes, such as the Human Rights Campaign and the Michael James Jackson Foundation. StateSide beat out Ketel One and Grey Goose to become the official vodka of the 2016 Democratic National Convention, held in Philadelphia.

In 2017 the Pennsylvania Liquor Control Board lifted regulations on the sale of liquor in the state, namely allowing liquor companies to sell their product in-house in tasting rooms. In response StateSide Urbancraft promptly opened the Federal Distilling Room next to their distillery in Fishtown. In 2018 StateSide Urbancraft opened its second ever showroom in the Lawrenceville neighborhood of Pittsburgh. That year StateSide reported selling 25,000 cases of vodka, and were expecting the number to double by 2019. During the COVID-19 lockdowns StateSide Urbancraft largely shifted to an online ordering and delivery system, as the state owned wine and spirit stores shut down. The company also shifted to producing hand sanitizer.

In 2019 StateSide Urbancraft partnered with Scarpetta Philadelphia, a famous pizzeria in Philadelphia, to start producing vodka infused pizzas. When Ben Simmons was traded from the Philadelphia 76ers to the Brooklyn Nets in 2022, StateSide Urbancraft offered a promotion where they would give anyone who gave them a Simmons jersey a $25 gift card. The jersey would then be donated to local homeless shelters. StateSide has also filled the niche of "health-conscious vodka" blending their vodka with electrolytes, and highlighting its gluten free nature.

In 2023 Men's Journal ranked StateSide as the 6th best cocktail vodka in the United States, comparing it to Tito's.
