= War Chant =

American-bred Thoroughbred racehorse (1997–2024)

- Sire: Danzig
- Grandsire: Northern Dancer
- Dam: Hollywood Wildcat
- Damsire: Kris S.
- Sex: Stallion
- Foaled: 1997
- Died: April 11, 2024 (aged 27)
- Country: United States
- Colour: Bay
- Breeder: Irving & Marjorie Cowan
- Owner: Irving & Marjorie Cowan
- Trainer: Neil D. Drysdale
- Record: 7: 5-1-0
- Earnings: US$1,130,600

Major wins
- Oak Tree Breeders' Cup Mile (2000); San Rafael Stakes (2000); Breeders' Cup wins: Breeders' Cup Mile (2000)

War Chant (1997 – April 11, 2024) was an American Thoroughbred racehorse best known for winning the 2000 Breeders' Cup Mile for owners and breeders, Irving & Marjorie Cowan.

Retired to stud, War Chant resided at Three Chimneys Farm. He died on April 11, 2024, at the age of 27.
