= Mare =

Adult female horse

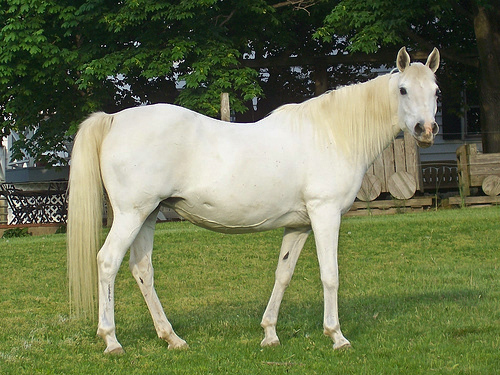
A broodmare. Note slight distension of belly, indicating either early pregnancy or recent foaling.

A mare is an adult female horse or other equine. In most cases, a mare is a female horse over the age of three, and a filly is a female horse three and younger. In Thoroughbred horse racing, a mare is defined as a female horse more than four years old. The word can also be used for other female equine animals, particularly mules and zebras, but a female donkey is usually called a "jenny". A broodmare is a mare used for breeding.

== Reproductive cycle ==
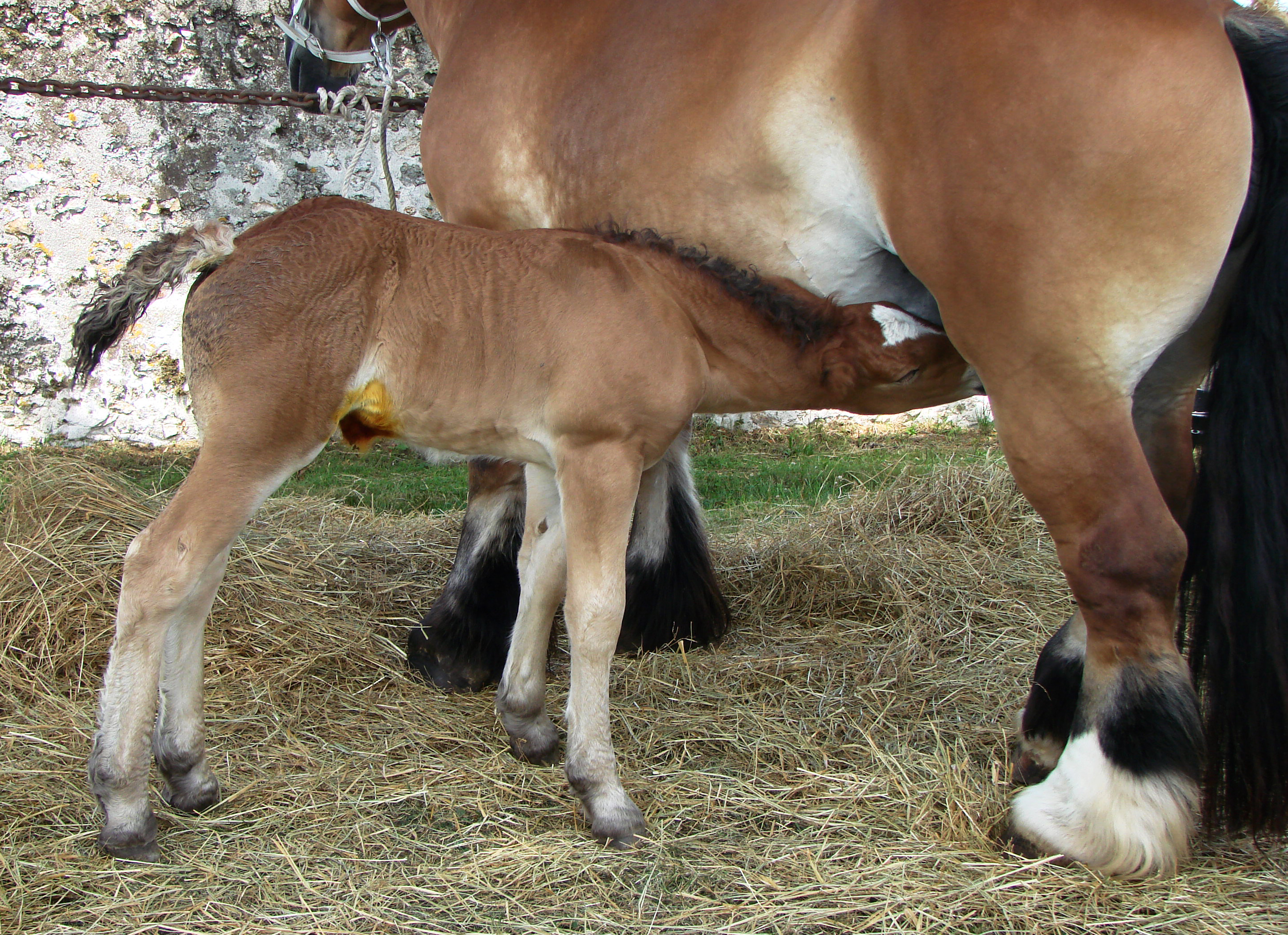
A nursing foal. Domesticated mares may nurse their foals an average of four to six months, occasionally longer, depending on human management decisions and the temperament of a given mare.

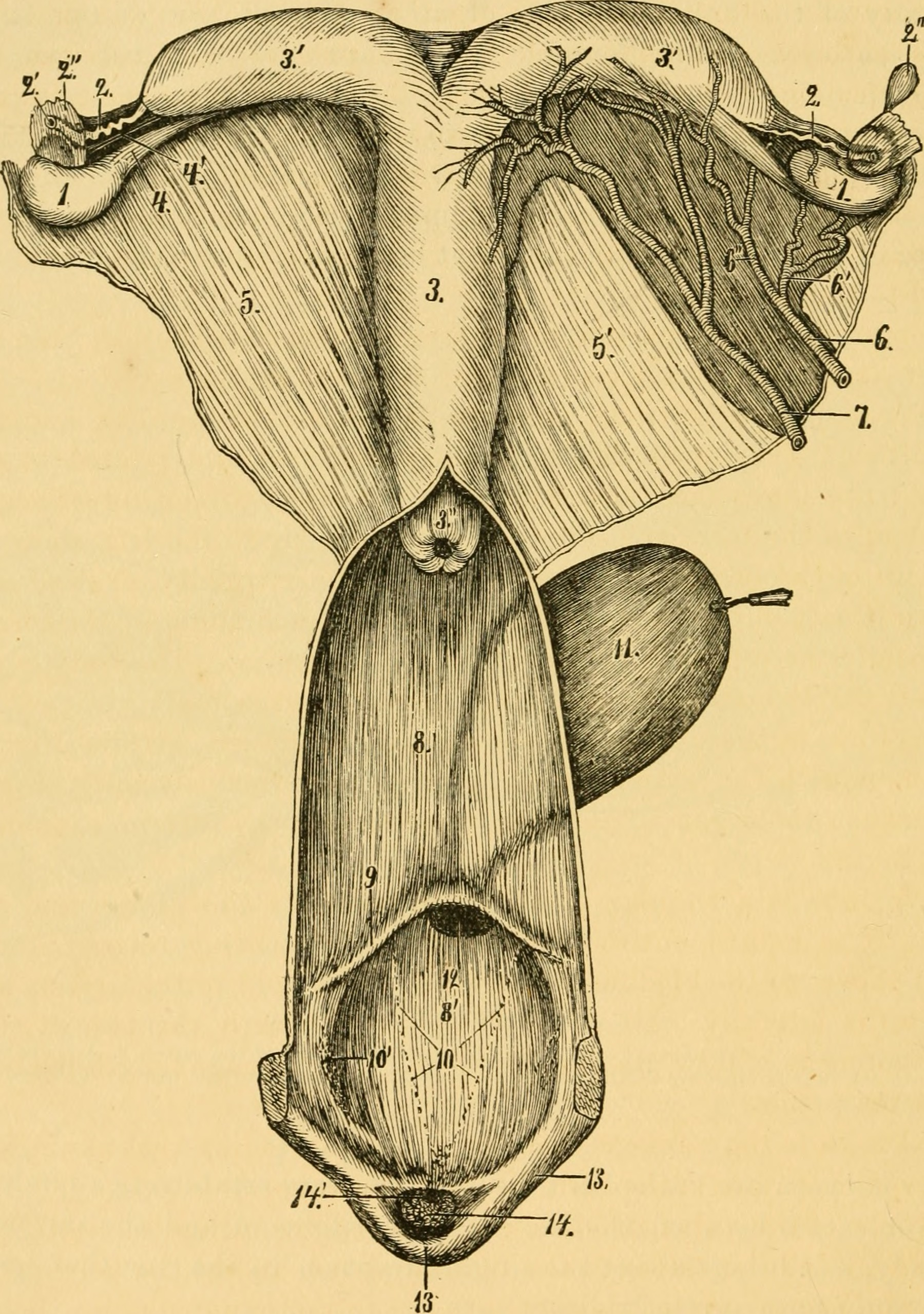
Reproductive organs of the mare (superior view).

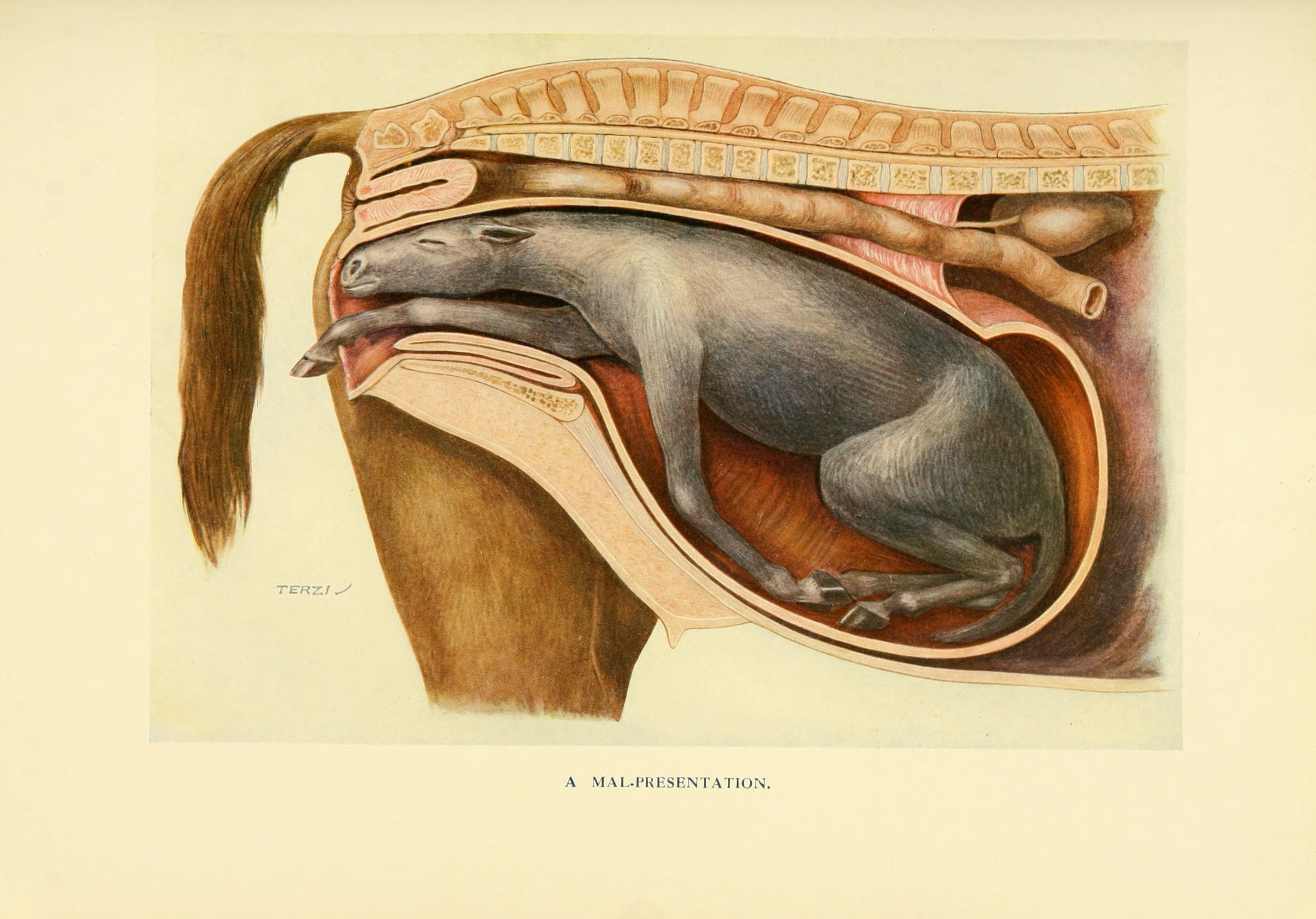
Illustration of a cross-section of the birth process, though the foal in the womb has a leg back, illustrating a problem delivery

Mares carry their young (called foals) for approximately 11 months from conception to birth, the average range being 320 to 370 days. Usually just one young is born; twins are rare. When a domesticated mare foals, she nurses the foal for at least four to six months before it is weaned, though mares in the wild may allow a foal to nurse for up to a year.

The estrous cycle, also known as "season" or "heat" of a mare occurs roughly every 19–22 days and occurs from early spring into autumn. As the days shorten, most mares enter an anestrus period during the winter and thus do not cycle in this period. The reproductive cycle in a mare is controlled by the photoperiod (length of the day), the cycle first triggered when the days begin to lengthen. As the days shorten, the mare returns to the anestrus period when she is not sexually receptive. Anestrus prevents the mare from conceiving in the winter months, as that would result in her foaling during the harshest part of the year, a time when it would be most difficult for the foal to survive.

However, for most competitive purposes, foals are given an official "birthday" of January 1 (August 1 in the Southern Hemisphere), and many breeders want foals to be born as early in the year as possible. Therefore, many breeding farms begin to put mares "under lights" in late winter in order to bring them out of anestrus early and allow conception to occur in February or March. One exception to this general rule is the field of endurance riding, which requires horses to be 60 true calendar months old (5 years) before competing at longer distances.

Fillies are sexually mature by age two and are sometimes bred at that age, but generally should not be bred until they have stopped growing, usually by age four or five.

A healthy, well-managed mare can produce a foal every year into her twenties, though not all breeders will breed a mare every year. In addition, many mares are kept for riding and so are not bred annually, as a mare in late pregnancy or nursing a foal is not able to perform at as athletic a standard as one who is neither pregnant nor lactating. In addition, some mares become anxious when separated from their foals, even temporarily, and thus are difficult to manage under saddle until their foals are weaned.

The formation of the bond between a mare and her foal "occurs during the first few hours post-partum, but that of the foal to the mare takes place over a period of days".

== Behavior ==
Mares are considered easier to handle than stallions. Some equestrians consider mares to be more difficult to handle than geldings. The results of a study by the Sydney School of Veterinary Science suggested that women riders have gendered assumptions about the suitability of mares, geldings and stallions for different disciplines and for different riders and chose different and more negative descriptors for the behavior of mares. This is despite an absence of scientific data confirming the assumptions. This may be significant for the handling and welfare of mares.

In wild herds, a "boss mare" or "lead mare" leads the band to grazing, to water, and away from danger. She eats and drinks first, decides when the herd will move and to where. The herd stallion usually brings up the rear and acts as a defender of the herd against predators and other stallions.

== Uses ==
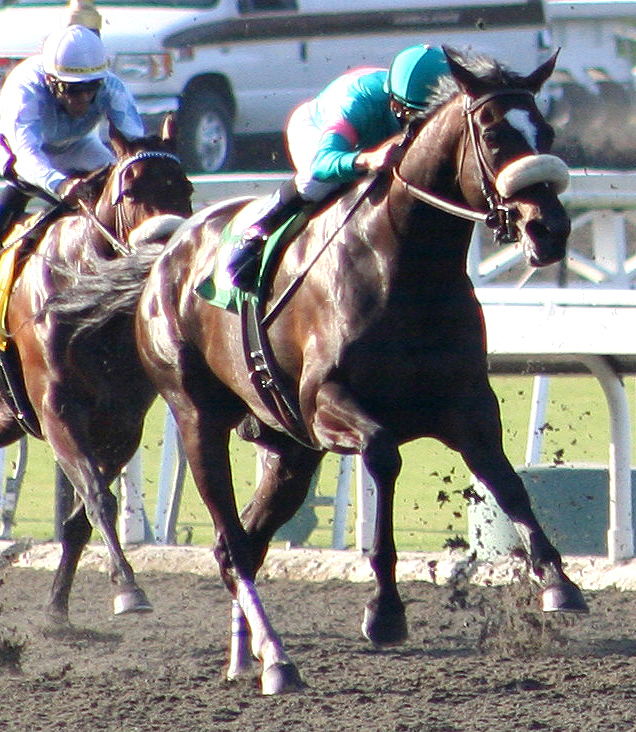
Mares can be used in any equestrian sport and have competed successfully against males. Zenyatta, winner of the 2009 Breeders' Cup Classic, racing in the Lady's Secret Stakes.

Mares are used in every equestrian sport and usually compete equally with stallions and geldings in most events, though some competitions may offer classes open only to one sex of horse or another, particularly in breeding or "in-hand" conformation classes. In horse racing, mares and fillies have their own races and only a small percentage compete against male horses. However, a few fillies and mares have won classic horse races against colts, including the Prix de l'Arc de Triomphe, the Kentucky Derby, the Preakness Stakes, the Belmont Stakes, the Melbourne Cup, the Breeders' Cup Classic and the Tōkyō Yūshun.

Mares are used as dairy animals in some cultures, especially by the nomads and formerly nomadic peoples of Central Asia. Fermented mare's milk, known as kumis, is the national drink of Kyrgyzstan. Some mares, usually of draft horse breeding, are kept in North America for the production of their urine. Pregnant mares' urine is the source of the active ingredient in the hormonal drug Premarin (derived from Pregnant mares' urine).

Until the invention of castration, and even later where there was less cultural acceptance of castration, mares were less difficult to manage than stallions and thus preferred for most ordinary work. Historically, the Bedouin nomads of the Arabian Peninsula preferred mares on their raids, because stallions would nicker to the opposing camps' horses, whereas mares would be quiet. However, other cultures preferred male horses over mares either due to a desire for more aggressive behavior in a fighting animal, or to not be inconvenienced with a loss of work ability due to a mare's pregnancy, parturition and lactation.

== Etymology ==
The word mare, meaning "female horse", took several forms before A.D. 900. In Old English the form was mīere, mere or mȳre, the feminine forms for mearh (horse). The Old German form of the word was Mähre. Similarly, in Irish and Gaelic, the word was marc, in Welsh, march, in Cornish "margh", and in Breton marc'h. The word is "said to be of Gaulish origin." It is said by some writers to derive from Proto-Germanic *marhijō ("female horse"), from Proto-Germanic marhaz ("horse"), from Proto-Indo-European *markos ("horse"). The word has no known cognates beyond Germanic and Celtic. However, one hypothesis links these Indo-European words to Mongolian морь (mori, horse).

One possible derived term is a mare's nest, an expression for "excitement over something which does not exist". The term nightmare, is not directly connected etymologically with the word for female horse, but rather to homophones that meant "incubus" or "goblin".
