= Lisa's Booby Trap =

American-bred Thoroughbred racehorse

- Sire: Drewman
- Grandsire: Unbridled
- Dam: Ennuhway
- Damsire: Notebook
- Sex: Female
- Foaled: 2007
- Country: United States
- Colour: Bay
- Breeder: Ocala Stud Farm
- Owner: Tim Snyder
- Trainer: Tim Snyder
- Record: 18: 10-2-3
- Earnings: $182,440

Major wins
- Loudonville Stakes
- Last updated on August 12, 2017

Lisa's Booby Trap (born April 11, 2007) is an American thoroughbred racehorse owned by Tim Snyder, a trainer at Finger Lakes Race Track in Farmington, New York, near Rochester. She is best known for the story surrounding her name, as she was named for her owner-trainer's deceased wife, Lisa.

== Family ==
Lisa's Booby Trap was bred in Florida by Ocala Stud Farm in Ocala, Florida. A bay filly, she was sired by Drewman, a sire best known for being a half-brother to Lucky Pulpit, the sire of California Chrome. She is out of the Notebook mare Ennuhway. Despite being from a mostly modest family, her grandsire is the great Unbridled, winner of the 1990 Kentucky Derby and Breeders' Cup Classic, and sire of horses such as Unbridled's Song, Halfbridled, Banshee Breeze, and Anees.

Blind in one eye, Lisa's Booby Trap overcame flat-footedness and a club foot to achieve more than $180,000 in earnings.

== Background and Name ==
Snyder bought the horse in early 2010 for $4,500, including his life savings of $2,000, with the balance to be paid after her first win. The filly was named after Snyder's late wife, Lisa, who, before her death, said she would reincarnate as a horse. "I don’t really believe so much in reincarnation," Snyder has been quoted as saying. "It’s a big word, you know what I mean? But, there are a lot of things in this horse that resemble my wife."

Snyder fixed the filly's hoof problems, which were causing her to kick herself on corners. He adjusted her shoes and discovered she could run quite well with the fixes.

== Racing career ==
Lisa's Booby Trap won her first three races, all at Finger Lakes, under jockey Elaine Castillo. Snyder then entered her in the black-type Loudonville Stakes at Saratoga Race Course, a six-furlong, $70,000 race, under jockey Kent Desormeaux, winning to remain undefeated in four starts.

She suffered her first loss by finishing last of ten in the Riskaverse Stakes at Saratoga under Desormeaux, her first race on turf. She raced in allowance races throughout most of her racing career, running twice more in stakes races. She finished eighth in the Rachel Alexandra Stakes at Saratoga and seventh in the listed Satin and Lace Stakes at Presque Isle Downs, which was the final race of her career.

Lisa's Booby Trap retired with a record of 18: 10-2-3 and earnings of $182,440.

== Broodmare career ==
Breeding reports state that Lisa's Booby Trap was bred to sire Disco Rico between 2014 and 2015, with no foal resulting from the coupling. She produced a chestnut colt by Big Brown in 2016. Named Not That Brady, he finished second in the Grade II Withers Stakes on February 2, 2019. He also won the Damon Runyon Stakes at Aqueduct Racetrack as a juvenile. Lisa's Booby Trap produced a filly by Tale of the Cat in 2017, later named Lisa's Tale. Lisa's Tale sold for $110,000 as a yearling at the 2018 Keeneland September Sale. She was bred to Hard Spun in 2017 for a 2018 foal.

Lisa's Booby Trap delivered a filly by Hard Spun in March 2018, later named Lisa's Legacy. She delivered a colt by Candy Ride in May 2019 and was bred to Gun Runner that year.

== Legacy ==
A book about Lisa's Booby Trap and her trainer was published by St. Martin's Griffin in 2013, The Ghost Horse: A True Story of Love, Death, and Redemption by Joe Layden.

An episode of Dateline NBC, entitled "Lisa's Booby Trap," about Lisa's Booby Trap aired in May 2014.

Lisa's Booby Trap's owner and trainer, Timothy Snyder, died March 24, 2015, at his home near Camillus, N.Y., according to a Democrat & Chronicle obituary. He was 59 years old. After Snyder's death, she was acquired by Katie Rich Farms to continue her career as a broodmare.
