= Wicked Whisper =

American thoroughbred racehorse

- Sire: Liam's Map
- Grandsire: Unbridleds Song
- Dam: Zayanna
- Damsire: Bernardini
- Sex: Mare
- Foaled: March 31st, 2017
- Country: USA
- Breeder: Siena Farms LLC
- Owner: Alex and JoAnn Leiblong
- Trainer: Steven M. Asmussen
- Jockey: Joel Rosario
- Record: 3:2-0-0
- Earnings: $329,500

Major wins
- Frizette Stakes (2019
- Last updated on January 12th, 2020

Wicked Whisper (foaled March 31, 2017) is an American Thoroughbred racehorse and the winner of the 2019 Frizette Stakes.

== Career ==
Wicked Whisper's first race was on August 25, 2019, at Saratoga, where she came in first.

Her second race was the October 6th, 2019, Grade-1 Frizette Stakes, where she came in first.

Her third race and final race of the 2019 season took place on November 1, 2019, where she finished a disappointing fifth place at the 2019 Breeders' Cup Juvenile Fillies.

== Pedigree ==
Pedigree of Wicked Whisper (USA), chestnut mare, 2017
Sire Liam's Map (USA) 2011	Unbridled's Song (USA); 1993	Unbridled	Fappiano
Sire Liam's Map (USA) 2011	Unbridled's Song (USA); 1993	Unbridled	Gana Facil
Sire Liam's Map (USA) 2011	Unbridled's Song (USA); 1993	Trolley Song	Caro
Sire Liam's Map (USA) 2011	Unbridled's Song (USA); 1993	Trolley Song	Lucky Spell
Sire Liam's Map (USA) 2011	Miss Macy Sue (USA); 2003	Trippi	End Sweep
Sire Liam's Map (USA) 2011	Miss Macy Sue (USA); 2003	Trippi	Jealous Appeal
Sire Liam's Map (USA) 2011	Miss Macy Sue (USA); 2003	Yada Yada	Great Above
Sire Liam's Map (USA) 2011	Miss Macy Sue (USA); 2003	Yada Yada	Stem
Dam Zayanna (USA) 2009	Bernardini (USA); 2003	A.P. Indy	Seattle Slew
Dam Zayanna (USA) 2009	Bernardini (USA); 2003	A.P. Indy	Weekend Surprise
Dam Zayanna (USA) 2009	Bernardini (USA); 2003	Cara Rafaela	Quiet American
Dam Zayanna (USA) 2009	Bernardini (USA); 2003	Cara Rafaela	Oil Fable
Dam Zayanna (USA) 2009	Heavenly Cat (USA); 1997	Tabasco Cat	Storm Cat
Dam Zayanna (USA) 2009	Heavenly Cat (USA); 1997	Tabasco Cat	Barbicue Sauce
Dam Zayanna (USA) 2009	Heavenly Cat (USA); 1997	In Excelcis Deo	Forty Niner
Dam Zayanna (USA) 2009	Heavenly Cat (USA); 1997	In Excelcis Deo	Sabin
