= Basin (horse) =

American thoroughbred racehorse

- Sire: Liam's Map
- Grandsire: Unbridled's Song
- Dam: Appenzell
- Damsire: Johannesburg
- Sex: Colt
- Foaled: 2017
- Country: United States
- Breeder: Cottonwood Stables, LLC
- Owner: Jackpot Farm
- Trainer: Steven M. Asmussen
- Record: 9:3-3-1
- Earnings: $563,260

Major wins
- Hopeful Stakes (2019)
- Last updated on April 20, 2021

Basin (foaled May 12, 2017) is an American Thoroughbred racehorse and the winner of the 2019 Hopeful Stakes.

== Career ==
Basin's first race was on June 14, 2019 at Churchill Downs, where he came in second. He earned his first victory in his second start on July 21, 2019 at Saratoga Race Course where he won a Maiden Special Weight race.

Basin competed in his first Grade 1 race on September 2, 2019, where he won the 2019 Hopeful Stakes.

His 2020 season was an up and down season. He came in third place in the March 14, 2020 Grade 2 Rebel Stakes and then came in fourth in the ungraded April 11, 2020 Oaklawn Stakes.

On May 2, 2020, he came back with a win in the Grade 1 Arkansas Derby, after Charlatan, the original winner, was disqualified, but in July 2020, came in a disappointing 10th in the Blue Grass Stakes. The Arkansas Derby win helped put him in the running on the 2020 Road to the Kentucky Derby.

On April 20, 2021, Charlatan's victory in the 2020 Arkansas Derby was restored.

== Pedigree ==
Pedigree of Basin (USA), bay horse, 2017
Sire Liam's Map (USA) 2011	Unbridled's Song (USA); 1993	Unbridled	Fappiano
Sire Liam's Map (USA) 2011	Unbridled's Song (USA); 1993	Unbridled	Gana Facil
Sire Liam's Map (USA) 2011	Unbridled's Song (USA); 1993	Trolley Song	Caro
Sire Liam's Map (USA) 2011	Unbridled's Song (USA); 1993	Trolley Song	Lucky Spell
Sire Liam's Map (USA) 2011	Miss Macy Sue (USA); 2003	Trippi	End Sweep
Sire Liam's Map (USA) 2011	Miss Macy Sue (USA); 2003	Trippi	Jealous Appeal
Sire Liam's Map (USA) 2011	Miss Macy Sue (USA); 2003	Yada Yada	Great Above
Sire Liam's Map (USA) 2011	Miss Macy Sue (USA); 2003	Yada Yada	Stem
Dam Appenzell (USA) 2005	Johannesburg (USA); 1999	Hennessy	Storm Cat
Dam Appenzell (USA) 2005	Johannesburg (USA); 1999	Hennessy	Island Kitty
Dam Appenzell (USA) 2005	Johannesburg (USA); 1999	Myth	Ogygian
Dam Appenzell (USA) 2005	Johannesburg (USA); 1999	Myth	Yarn
Dam Appenzell (USA) 2005	Bouron Blues (USA); 1995	Seeking the Gold	Mr. Prospector
Dam Appenzell (USA) 2005	Bouron Blues (USA); 1995	Seeking the Gold	Con Game
Dam Appenzell (USA) 2005	Bouron Blues (USA); 1995	Beal Street Blues	Dixieland Band
Dam Appenzell (USA) 2005	Bouron Blues (USA); 1995	Beal Street Blues	Windmill Gal
