= Liam's Map =

American-bred Thoroughbred racehorse

- Sire: Unbridled's Song
- Grandsire: Unbridled
- Dam: Miss Macy Sue
- Damsire: Trippi
- Sex: Stallion
- Foaled: 14 March 2011
- Country: United States
- Colour: Gray
- Breeder: Albaugh Family Stable
- Owner: Teresa Viola Racing Stables & West Point Thoroughbreds
- Trainer: Todd Pletcher
- Record: 8: 6-2-0
- Earnings: $1,358,940

Major wins
- Harlan's Holiday Stakes (2014); Woodward Stakes (2015); Breeders' Cup Dirt Mile (2015)

Liam's Map (foaled 14 March 2011) is an American Thoroughbred racehorse. Unraced as a juvenile, he won three of his four races in 2014 without being tested against top-class opposition. As a four-year-old he emerged as one of the best horses in North America with win in the Woodward Stakes and the Breeders' Cup Dirt Mile. He was retired at the end of the season with a record of six wins and two places in eight starts.

== Background ==
Liam's Map is a gray horse bred in Kentucky by the Albaugh Family Stable. He was sired by the Breeders' Cup Juvenile winner Unbridled's Song from whom he inherited his gray color. Unbridled's Song's other major winners have included Zensational, Unrivaled Belle, Will Take Charge, Midshipman and Eight Belles. Liam's Map's dam Miss Macy Sue was a successful racemare who won eleven of her twenty-five races including the Grade III Winning Colors Stakes at Churchill Downs in 2007. She was descended from the champion sprinter Ta Wee who was a half sister to Dr Fager and to the broodmare Magic whose descendants included Unbridled.

As a yearling Liam's Map was consigned to the Keeneland sales and bought for $800,000 by St Elias Stables. He entered the ownership of Teresa Viola Racing Stables and was sent into training with Todd Pletcher.

== Racing career ==
=== 2014: three-year-old season ===
Liam's Map began his track career in a maiden race over seven furlongs on August 23 at Saratoga Race Course. Ridden as in all of his 2014 starts by John Velazquez he took the lead in the stretch but was overtaken in the closing stages and beaten two and a quarter lengths by the favored Three Alarm Fire. On September 26 the colt started favorite for a one-mile maiden at Belmont Park and opened his winning account as he took the lead in the stretch and drew away to come home nine and a half lengths clear of Point Hope. Liam's Map next appeared in a one-mile allowance race at Aqueduct Racetrack on November 16 and recorded another emphatic win, finishing eleven and a half lengths clear of his six opponents. On his final appearance of 2014, Liam's Map was matched against older horses in the Harlan's Holiday Stakes over eight and a half furlongs at Gulfstream Park on December 13 and started favorite ahead of Pants On Fire, a six-year-old who had won four Graded stakes races and finished third to Goldencents in the Breeders' Cup Dirt Mile. The colt took the lead exiting the backstretch and got the better of a sustained struggle with the four-year-old gelding Valid to win by half a length.

=== 2015: four-year-old season ===
Liam's Map began his second season on June 19 at Belmont when he started odds-on favorite for an allowance race over one mile. Ridden by Javier Castellano he led from the start and won by one and a half lengths from the five-year-old gelding Confrontation, to whom he was conceding six pounds.

The colt was then moved up sharply in class for the Grade I Whitney Stakes over nine furlongs at Saratoga in August and started 5/1 fourth choice behind Tonalist, Honor Code and Lea. Ridden by Mike Smith, he led from the start and kicked four lengths clear in the straight but was caught in the final stride and beaten a neck by Honor Code. After the race Pletcher said "He ran unbelievably well, setting those fractions to start and being there to the end. He just couldn't hold off a really good horse".

On September 5 at Saratoga, Castellano resumed his partnership with Liam's Map when the colt started favorite for the Grade I Woodward Stakes. His main rivals appeared to be Effinex (Suburban Handicap), Wicked Strong, Protonico (Alysheba Stakes) and Coach Inge (Brooklyn Handicap). Liam's Map led from the start, drew away from his rivals in the straight and won easily by four and three quarter lengths from Coach Inge with Wicked Strong in third. Pletcher commented "I'm just happy to see him get that Grade I that he deserves so much... he has that style where he can get into a cruising speed and just keep carrying it... He just gets into that rhythm and he just runs horses off their feet".

At the Breeders' Cup meeting at Keeneland, Liam's Map's connections opted to miss a clash with American Pharoah in the Classic and instead contest the Breeders' Cup Dirt Mile on 30 October. Shortly before the race it was announced that an interest in the horse had been bought by Lane's End and that Liam's Map would be retired to the Versailles, Kentucky-based stud for the 2016 season. In the Dirt Mile, Liam's Map started 1/2 favourite against ten opponents headed by Lea, with the others including Red Vine, Wicked Strong, Bradester (Monmouth Cup), Tapiture (runner-up in the race in 2014), War Envoy (Britannia Stakes), Mr Z (Ohio Derby) and Valid. Castellano tracked the leaders as Bradester set the pace before switching out to make his challenge in the straight. Liam's Map overtook Lea inside the final furlong and drew away to win by two and a half lengths. Lea took second, three and a quarter lengths ahead of Red Vine who was in turn three and a quarter lengths clear of Wicked Strong in fourth. Castellano explained that he had intended to lead from the start and had to change his tactics when the colt did not break as quickly as expected. He commented "In this game you have to have a Plan B. I think the key was patience. He waited behind horses and it was phenomenal. He showed great skill. He can run on the pace or off the pace. I had to fight a little to put him behind horses, but when he was in the clear, he exploded".

In the Eclipse Awards for 2015, finished runner-up to Honor Code in the poll for American Champion Older Dirt Male Horse receiving 95 votes to his rival's 126.

== Statistics ==
Date	Distance	Race	Grade	Track	Odds	Field	Finish	Winning Time	Winning (Losing) Margin	Jockey	Ref
2014 – three-year-old season
Aug 23, 2014	7 furlongs	Maiden Special Weight		Saratoga	2.00	9	2	1:24.08	(2 1/4 lengths)	Joel Rosario	
Sep 26, 2014	1 mile	Maiden Special Weight		Belmont Park	0.75*	7	1	1:34.72	9 1/2 lengths	John Velazquez	
Nov 16, 2014	1 mile	Allowance		Aqueduct	0.35*	7	1	1:35.67	11 1/2 lengths	John Velazquez	
Dec 13, 2014	1 1/16 mile	Harlan's Holiday Stakes	Black Type	Gulfstream Park	1.10*	8	1	1:52.51	1/2 length	John Velazquez	
2015 – four-year-old season
Jun 19, 2015	1 mile	Allowance		Belmont Park	0.40*	4	1	1:34.48	1 3/4 lengths	Javier Castellano	
Aug 8, 2015	1 1/8 miles	Whitney Stakes	I	Saratoga	5.10	9	2	1:47.82	(neck)	Javier Castellano	
Sep 5, 2015	1 1/8 miles	Woodward Stakes	I	Saratoga	1.20*	8	1	1:47.44	4 3/4 lengths	Javier Castellano	
Oct 30, 2015	1 mile	Breeders' Cup Dirt Mile	I	Keeneland	0.50*	11	1	1:34.54 (Note: New track record)	2 1/2 lengths	Javier Castellano	

Notes:
An (*) asterisk after the odds means Liam's Map was the post-time favorite.

== Stud career ==
After Liam's Map's victory in the Breeders' Cup Mile, Lane's End Farm announced publicly that they had acquired the rights to stand him as a stallion, alongside Eclipse Award nominee Honor Code, beginning in 2016. His initial stud fee was set at $25,000.

Liam's Map's first winner came on July 21, 2019, when bay colt Basin won a six furlong maiden special weight at Saratoga. The colt is out of Appenzell, a daughter of Johannesburg, who also produced millionaire Rise Up by Rockport Harbor.

Basin would go on to become his sire's first graded stakes or stakes winner when he won the Grade I Hopeful Stakes at Saratoga. The Steve Asmussen-trained colt took the lead down the stretch and drew away to win by 6 1/2 lengths on a sloppy track.

=== Notable progeny ===
Liam's Map has sired seven Grade One winners.

c = colt, f = filly, g = gelding

Foaled	Name	Sex	Major Wins
2017	Basin	c	Hopeful Stakes
2017	Colonel Liam	c	Pegasus World Cup Turf Stakes (twice), Turf Classic Stakes
2017	Wicked Whisper	f	Frizette Stakes
2019	Juju's Map	f	Alcibiades Stakes
2021	Deterministic	c	Manhattan Stakes (twice), Fourstardave Stakes (twice), Breeders' Cup Mile
2022	Burnham Square	c	Blue Grass Stakes, Arlington Million Stakes
2023	Napoleon Solo	c	Champagne Stakes, Preakness Stakes

== Pedigree ==
Pedigree of Liam's Map (USA) gray 2011
Sire Unbridled's Song (USA) 1993	Unbridled (USA); 1987	Fappiano	Mr. Prospector*
Sire Unbridled's Song (USA) 1993	Unbridled (USA); 1987	Fappiano	Killaloe
Sire Unbridled's Song (USA) 1993	Unbridled (USA); 1987	Gana Facil	Le Fabuleux
Sire Unbridled's Song (USA) 1993	Unbridled (USA); 1987	Gana Facil	Charedi
Sire Unbridled's Song (USA) 1993	Trolley Song (USA); 1983	Caro	Fortino
Sire Unbridled's Song (USA) 1993	Trolley Song (USA); 1983	Caro	Chambord
Sire Unbridled's Song (USA) 1993	Trolley Song (USA); 1983	Lucky Spell	Lucky Mel
Sire Unbridled's Song (USA) 1993	Trolley Song (USA); 1983	Lucky Spell	Incantation
Dam Miss Macy Sue (USA) 2003	Trippi (USA); 1997	End Sweep	Forty Niner*
Dam Miss Macy Sue (USA) 2003	Trippi (USA); 1997	End Sweep	Broom Dance
Dam Miss Macy Sue (USA) 2003	Trippi (USA); 1997	Jealous Appeal	Valid Appeal
Dam Miss Macy Sue (USA) 2003	Trippi (USA); 1997	Jealous Appeal	Jealous Cat
Dam Miss Macy Sue (USA) 2003	Yada Yada (USA); 1996	Great Above	Minnesota Mac
Dam Miss Macy Sue (USA) 2003	Yada Yada (USA); 1996	Great Above	Ta Wee*
Dam Miss Macy Sue (USA) 2003	Yada Yada (USA); 1996	Stem	Damascus
Dam Miss Macy Sue (USA) 2003	Yada Yada (USA); 1996	Stem	Tweak* (Family 1-r)

* Liam's Map is inbred 4S x 5D to the stallion Mr. Prospector, meaning that he appears in the fourth generation on his sire side and in the fifth generation (via Forty Niner) on the dam side of his pedigree.

* Liam's Map is inbred 4D x 5D to the mare Ta Wee, meaning that she appears in the fourth and fifth generation (via Tweak) on the dam side of his pedigree.
