= Speech (horse) =

American thoroughbred racehorse

- Sire: Mr. Speaker
- Grandsire: Pulpit
- Dam: Scribbling Sarah
- Damsire: Frued
- Sex: Filly
- Foaled: 2017
- Country: USA
- Color: Bay
- Breeder: Gail Rice
- Owner: Eclipse Thoroughbred Partners & Madaket Stables LLC
- Trainer: Michael W. McCarthy
- Record: 7:3-3-1
- Earnings: $378,240

Major wins
- Ashland Stakes (2020)
- Last updated on July 29th, 2020

Speech (foaled February 12, 2017) is an American Thoroughbred racehorse and the winner of the 2020 Ashland Stakes.

== Career ==
Speech's first race was on November 15, 2019, at Del Mar Racetrack, where she came in third. Speech picked up her first win in her second start on December 14, 2019, at Los Alamitos Race Course.

She competed in her first stakes race on March 8, 2020, at the Grade-3 Santa Ysabel Stakes and came in 2nd place, behind Donna Veloce. This was Speech's first two-turn race.

Speech's next race was on May 2, 2020, at Oaklawn Park, where she picked up a win in an Allowance Optional Claiming race.

On June 6, 2020, Speech competed in the Grade-2 Santa Anita Oaks. She finished four lengths behind the victor, Swiss Skydiver, but finished over seven lengths ahead of Merneith. The result gave Speech 40 qualification points towards the 2020 Kentucky Oaks.

Speech won the most important race of her career on July 11, 2020, when she captured the Grade-1 Ashland Stakes. She came into the race with 4:1 odds as the third favorite horse and won by 3 lengths in an upset. This victory qualified her for the 2020 Kentucky Oaks.

== Pedigree ==
Pedigree of Speech (USA), 2017
Sire Mr. Speaker (USA) b. 2011	Pulpit (USA) b. 1994	A.P. Indy	Seattle Slew
Sire Mr. Speaker (USA) b. 2011	Pulpit (USA) b. 1994	A.P. Indy	Weekend Surprise
Sire Mr. Speaker (USA) b. 2011	Pulpit (USA) b. 1994	Preach	Mr. Prospector
Sire Mr. Speaker (USA) b. 2011	Pulpit (USA) b. 1994	Preach	Narrate
Sire Mr. Speaker (USA) b. 2011	Salute (USA) b. 2002	Unbridled	Fappiano
Sire Mr. Speaker (USA) b. 2011	Salute (USA) b. 2002	Unbridled	Gana Facil
Sire Mr. Speaker (USA) b. 2011	Salute (USA) b. 2002	Personal Ensign	Private Account
Sire Mr. Speaker (USA) b. 2011	Salute (USA) b. 2002	Personal Ensign	Grecian Banner
Dam Scirbbling Sarah (USA) b. 2010	Freud (USA) b. 1998	Storm Cat	Storm Bird
Dam Scirbbling Sarah (USA) b. 2010	Freud (USA) b. 1998	Storm Cat	Terlingua
Dam Scirbbling Sarah (USA) b. 2010	Freud (USA) b. 1998	Mariah's Storm	Rahy
Dam Scirbbling Sarah (USA) b. 2010	Freud (USA) b. 1998	Mariah's Storm	Immense
Dam Scirbbling Sarah (USA) b. 2010	Plinking (USA) b. 2000	Talkin Man	With Approval
Dam Scirbbling Sarah (USA) b. 2010	Plinking (USA) b. 2000	Talkin Man	Pookette
Dam Scirbbling Sarah (USA) b. 2010	Plinking (USA) b. 2000	Holy Wish	Lord at War
Dam Scirbbling Sarah (USA) b. 2010	Plinking (USA) b. 2000	Holy Wish	Holy Moly
