= Jaywalk (horse) =

American racehorse

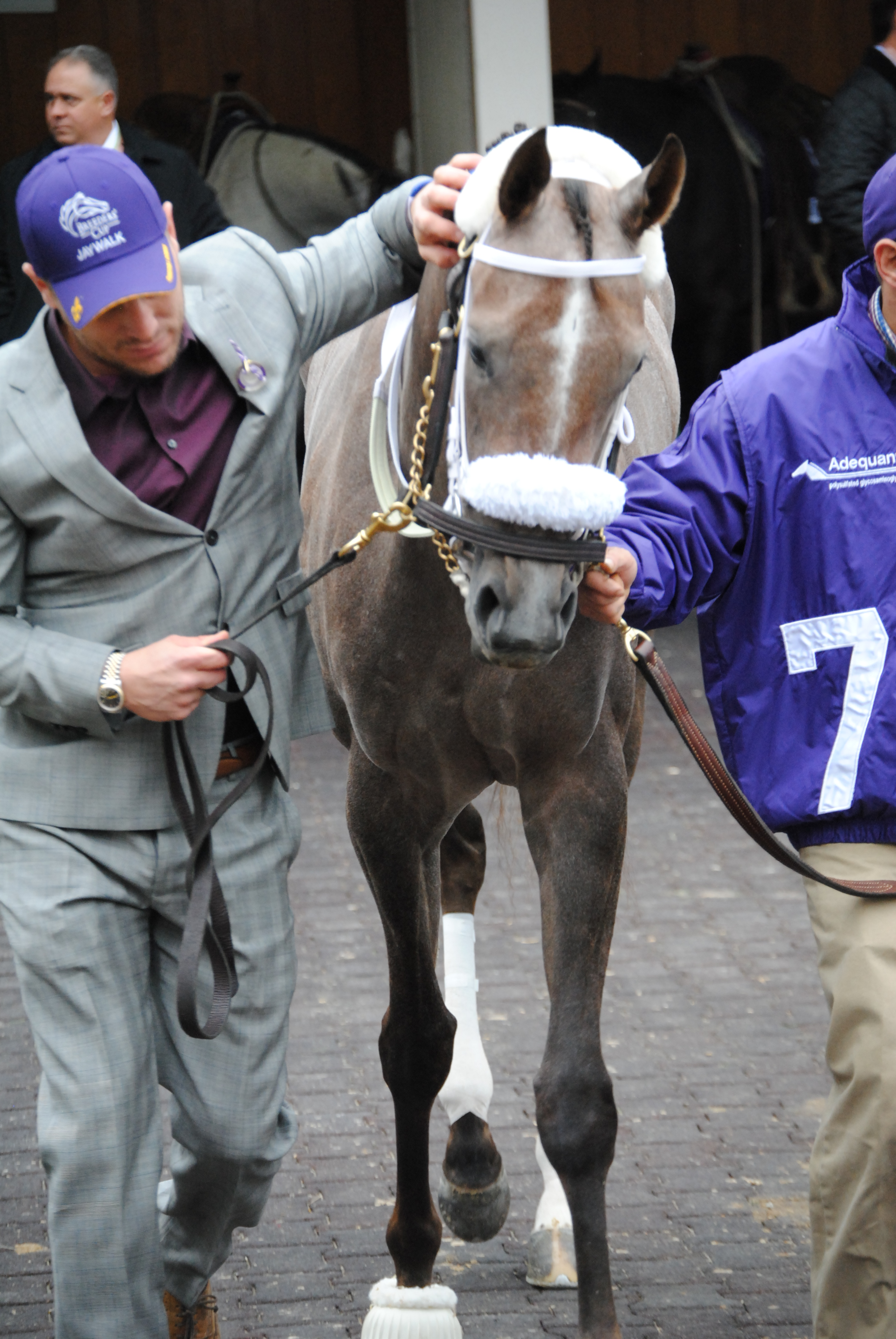
- Jaywalk prior to winning the Breeders' Cup Juvenile Fillies
- Sire: Cross Traffic
- Grandsire: Unbridled's Song
- Dam: Lady Pewitt
- Damsire: Orientate
- Sex: Filly
- Foaled: 2016
- Country: United States
- Colour: Gray / Roan
- Breeder: Gainesway Thoroughbreds Ltd.
- Owner: Cash is King, LLC (Zacney, et al) & D J Stable, LL (Leonard C. Green)
- Trainer: John Servis
- Record: 11: 5-2-1
- Earnings: US$1,668,500

Major wins
- White Clay Creek Stakes (2018); Frizette Stakes (2018); Delaware Oaks (2019); Breeders' Cup wins: Breeders' Cup Juvenile Fillies (2018)
- Last updated on 27 April 2023

Jaywalk (foaled March 30, 2016 in Kentucky) is a Thoroughbred filly racehorse who in 2018 won the $2,000,000 Breeders' Cup Juvenile Fillies, the world's richest race of its class. She is trained by John Servis for owners Cash is King, LLC (Charles J. Zacney, et al.) and D J Stable, LL (Leonard C. Green).

== Breeding ==
Bred in Kentucky by Gainesway Thoroughbreds Ltd., Jaywalk was sired by Grade 1 winner Cross Traffic. He was a son of Unbridled's Song who won the 1995 Breeders' Cup Juvenile and in 2017 was the Leading sire in North America. Jaywalk's dam was Lady Pewitt who made only one race start. She was the daughter of 2002 Breeders' Cup Sprint winner and the 2002 American Champion Sprint Horse Orientate.

== Pedigree ==
Pedigree of Jaywalk, gray/roan filly, March 30, 2016
Sire Cross Traffic	Unbridled's Song	Unbridled	Fappiano
Sire Cross Traffic	Unbridled's Song	Unbridled	Gana Facil
Sire Cross Traffic	Unbridled's Song	Trolley Song	Caro
Sire Cross Traffic	Unbridled's Song	Trolley Song	Lucky Spell
Sire Cross Traffic	Stop Traffic	Cure The Blues	Stop The Music
Sire Cross Traffic	Stop Traffic	Cure The Blues	Quick Cure
Sire Cross Traffic	Stop Traffic	Save My Soul	Ima Hell Raiser
Sire Cross Traffic	Stop Traffic	Save My Soul	Somethingexciting
Dam Lady Pewitt	Orientate	Mt. Livermore	Blushing Groom
Dam Lady Pewitt	Orientate	Mt. Livermore	Flama Ardiente
Dam Lady Pewitt	Orientate	Dream Team	Cox's Ridge
Dam Lady Pewitt	Orientate	Dream Team	Likely Double
Dam Lady Pewitt	Spin Room	Spinning World	Nureyev
Dam Lady Pewitt	Spin Room	Spinning World	Imperfect Circle
Dam Lady Pewitt	Spin Room	La Paz	Hold Your Peace
Dam Lady Pewitt	Spin Room	La Paz	Classy Craft (family: 16-g)
