= Octave (horse) =

American-bred Thoroughbred racehorse

- Octave before the 2006 Breeders' Cup Juvenile Fillies
- Sire: Unbridled's Song
- Grandsire: Unbridled
- Dam: Belle Nuit
- Damsire: Dr. Carter
- Sex: Filly
- Foaled: 2004
- Country: United States
- Colour: Gray
- Breeder: Martin J. Wygod
- Owner: Sheikh Mohammed bin Rashid Al Maktoum
- Trainer: Todd Pletcher
- Record: 13: 4-7-2
- Earnings: $1,660,934

Major wins
- Adirondack Breeders' Cup Stakes (2006); Mother Goose Stakes (2007); Coaching Club American Oaks (2007)
- Last updated on January 20, 2007

Octave (foaled April 13, 2004, in Kentucky) is a retired American-bred thoroughbred racehorse and broodmare best known for taking the Grade I Mother Goose Stakes and Coaching Club American Oaks both in 2007.

== Background ==
Octave is a gray mare bred by Martin J. Wygood. She is by Unbridled's song, 2nd on the general list of North American sires as of 2017, and son of Unbridled, known for winning the 1990 Kentucky Derby. She is out of the Dr. Carter mare, Belle Nuit. Octave is a full or half-sister to three stakes winners, the most notable being Grade II winner Belle Cherie, who is a stake winning dam.

Octave comes from the female family line 3-e, responsible for other champions such as Sunday Silence, Wild Again, and Wajma.

Octave raced for Starlight Racing and was trained by Todd A. Pletcher.

== Racing career ==
Her only win as a two-year-old came in the GIII Adirondack Breeders' Cup Stakes, followed by two second-place finishes, one to Dreaming of Anna in the Breeders' Cup Juvenile Fillies and the other to Rags to Riches in the Kentucky Oaks. The following spring she then finished second again in the Fair Grounds Oaks and the Ashland Stakes.

After five consecutive second places, Octave won her first Grade I taking the Mother Goose Stakes followed by a second GI in the Coaching Club American Oaks, in August, 2007, trainer Todd Pletcher entered her in the final jewel in the Triple Tiara, the 1-mile Alabama Stakes at Saratoga Race Course. Ridden by John Velazquez, Octave lost a stretch duel by Lady Joanne and Lear's Princess and finished third after a steward's inquiry upheld that Lady Joanne did not squeeze out Octave.

Octave's owners pledged a portion of her winnings from the Alabama Stakes to the Make-a-Wish Foundation for charity, according to co-owner Don Lucarelli.

On September 22, Octave ran in the $750,000 Grade II Fitz Dixon Cotillion Handicap at Philadelphia Park, where she placed second behind Bear Now, who wired the race. She then finished third in late October's Breeders' Cup Distaff, held in 2007 at Monmouth Park.

== Retirement and broodmare career ==
After her Three-Year Old Season, Octave was sold at the 2007 Fasig-Tipton Kentucky November mixed sale for US$4,000,000. It was announced by Bloodhorse that Octave would be retired to become a broodmare for Sheikh Mohammed's Darley in Central Kentucky.

== Resources ==
- BloodHorse. “Fasig-Tipton Kentucky 2007 Fall Mixed Sale.” BloodHorse, November 4, 2007, https://www.bloodhorse.com/horse-racing/thoroughbred-sales/results/2007/4874/fasig-tipton-kentucky-2007-fall-mixed-sale/1. Accessed 09 11 2026.
- BloodHorse. “Octave Retired.” BloodHorse, 09 12 2007, https://www.bloodhorse.com/horse-racing/articles/156954/octave-retired. Accessed 09 11 2026.
- FASIG-TIPTON KENTUCKY, INC. “FASIG-TIPTON KENTUCKY, INC. NOVEMBER SELECTED MIXED SALE.” Fasig-Tipton, 04 11 2007, https://www.fasigtipton.com/sites/default/files/2018-07/FTKNOV2007res.pdf. Accessed 09 11 2026.
  - Hunter, Avalyn. “Sunday Silence.” American Classic Pedigrees, https://www.americanclassicpedigrees.com/sunday-silence.html. Accessed 9 11 2026.
  - Hunter, Avalyn. “Wajma.” American Classic Pedigrees, 1 August 2026, https://www.americanclassicpedigrees.com/wajima.html. Accessed 9 11 2026.
  - Hunter, Avalyn. “Wild Again (horse).” American Classic Pedigrees, https://www.americanclassicpedigrees.com/wild-again.html. Accessed 9 11 2026.
  - “Pedigree & Partial Stats
- Portion of Octave Alabama Earnings To Go To Charity
