= Cross Traffic (horse) =

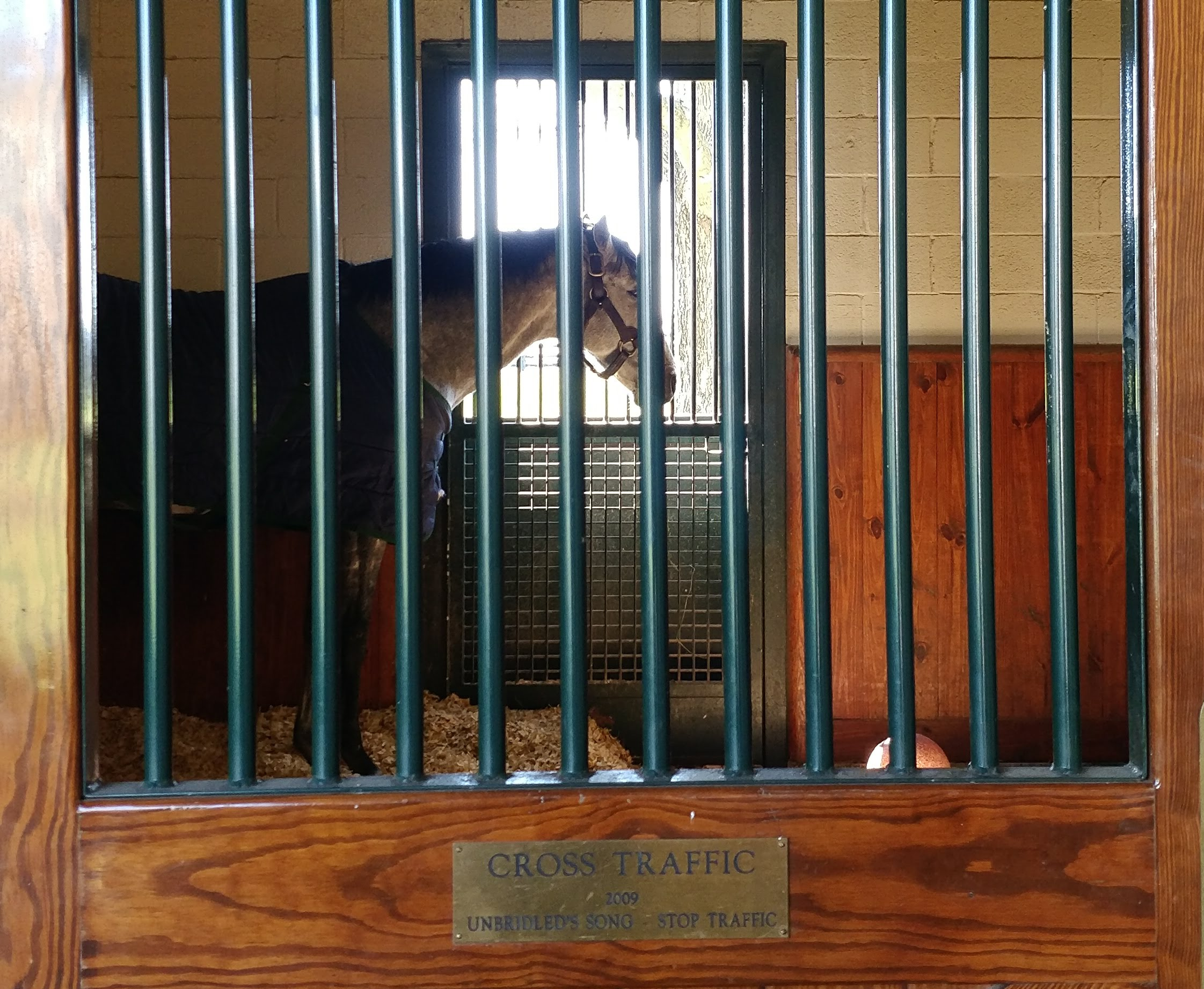
- Cross Traffic in 2018
- Sire: Unbridled's Song
- Grandsire: Unbridled
- Dam: Stop Traffic
- Damsire: Cure the Blues
- Sex: Colt
- Foaled: February 15, 2009
- Country: United States
- Color: Gray or roan
- Breeder: Diamond A Racing
- Owner: GoldMark Farm
- Trainer: Todd A. Pletcher
- Record: 6: 3-2-0
- Earnings: $687,967

Major wins
- Whitney Invitational Handicap (2013)
- Last updated on 27 April 2023

Cross Traffic (foaled February 15, 2009) is a retired American Thoroughbred racehorse who won the Grade I Whitney Invitational Handicap at Belmont Park in 2013 as a four-year-old.

== Background ==
Cross Traffic is a gray or roan colt that was bred in Kentucky by Diamond A Racing Corp. and was a $300,000 purchase at the 2010 Fasig-Tipton New York Saratoga select yearling sale when consigned by Taylor Made Sales Agency, agent. His dam Stop Traffic was a multiple Grade I winner, victorious in the Santa Monica Handicap and Ballerina Handicap. He was sired by Unbridled's Song, the leading sire in the US in 2017.

Cross Traffic was trained by US Hall of Fame trainer Todd A. Pletcher.

== Racing career ==
=== 2013: four-year-old season ===
Starting his career at Gulfstream Park January 24, he reeled off two impressive victories before tackling graded stakes company in only his third start. In the April 27 Grade III Westchester Stakes he earned a 1 1/2 Ragozin number when losing by a short head to Belmont specialist Flat Out, who finished in a time of 1:32.99, three-fifths of a second off the world record.

Cross Traffic followed that effort with a nose loss to Sahara Sky in the Grade I Metropolitan Handicap, just getting nipped after setting the pace in the one-mile test. In the Whitney Invitational Handicap, his first time around two turns, which he won by three quarters of a length over Successful Dan while defeating the one-two finishers of the 2012 Breeders' Cup Classic, Fort Larned and Mucho Macho Man, and 2012 Travers Stakes winner Alpha. In the Jockey Club Gold Cup Cross Traffic stumbled badly out of the starting gate and was no factor in the race when finishing seventh. It was found that he injured his shin and did not return to the racetrack again.

== Statistics ==
Date	Distance	Race	Grade	Track	Odds	Field	Finish	Winning Time	Winning (Losing) Margin	Jockey	Ref
2013 – Four-year-old season
Jan 24, 2013	6 1/2 furlongs	Maiden Special Weight		Gulfstream Park	0.70*	6	1	1:15.79	1 3/4 lengths	John Velazquez	
Mar 10, 2013	1 mile	Allowance		Gulfstream Park	1.20*	6	1	1:35.17	7 1/2 lengths	John Velazquez	
Apr 27, 2013	1 mile	Westchester Stakes	III	Belmont Park	1.05*	5	2	1:32.99	(head)	Javier Castellano	
May 27, 2013	1 mile	Metropolitan Handicap	I	Belmont Park	2.90	9	2	1:34.17	(nose)	John Velazquez	
Aug 3, 2013	1 1/8 miles	Whitney Handicap	I	Saratoga	3.55	8	1	1:47.89	3/4 length	John Velazquez	
Sep 28, 2013	1 1/4 miles	Jockey Club Gold Cup	I	Belmont Park	3.40	8	7	1:59.70	(16 3/4 lengths)	John Velazquez	

Notes:
An (*) asterisk after the odds means Cross Traffic was the post-time favorite.

== Stud career ==
Cross Traffic was retired in 2014 and would stand at Spendthrift Farm in Lexington, Kentucky and offered immediately to breeders through Spendthrift's "Share the Upside Program" on a limited basis for $17,500. His 2015 stands & nurses fee were $15,000.

On May 3, 2018, Dreaming Diamonds gave freshman sire Cross Traffic his first check mark in the winner's column, when she captured a 4 1/2-furlong maiden special weight at Churchill Downs in near gate-to-wire fashion by 3 1/4 lengths. In 2018 Cross Traffic would stand for $7,500. Jaywalk's victory in the Breeders' Cup Juvenile Fillies in 2018 gave Cross Traffic top Freshman-sire honors and increased his fee for 2019 to $25,000. In 2023 Cross Traffic stands for $7,500 Live Foal.

=== Notable progeny ===
c = colt, f = filly, g = gelding

Foaled	Name	Sex	Major wins
2016	Jaywalk	f	Frizette Stakes; Breeders' Cup Juvenile Fillies
2016	Capocostello (Note: Capocostello won six Grade I events in Panama which is Part II of the International Federation of Horseracing Authorities. These events are considered Black Type events.)	c	Clásico Junta de Control de Juegos (PAN) (2019, 2020); Clásico Año Nuevo (PAN) (2020, 2023); Clásico Independecia (PAN) (2020); Gran Clásico Presidente de la Republica (PAN) (2021)
2020	Defining Purpose	f	Ashland Stakes

== Pedigree ==
Pedigree of Cross Traffic, gray or roan colt, February 15, 2009
Sire Unbridled's Song (1993)	Unbridled (1987)	Fappiano (1977)	Mr Prospector (1970)
Sire Unbridled's Song (1993)	Unbridled (1987)	Fappiano (1977)	Killaloe (1970)
Sire Unbridled's Song (1993)	Unbridled (1987)	Gana Facil (1981)	Le Fabuleux (FR) (1961)
Sire Unbridled's Song (1993)	Unbridled (1987)	Gana Facil (1981)	Charedi (1976)
Sire Unbridled's Song (1993)	Trolley Song (1983)	Caro (IRE) (1967)	Fortino II (FR) (1959)
Sire Unbridled's Song (1993)	Trolley Song (1983)	Caro (IRE) (1967)	Chambord (GB (1956)
Sire Unbridled's Song (1993)	Trolley Song (1983)	Lucky Spell (1971)	Lucky Mel (1954)
Sire Unbridled's Song (1993)	Trolley Song (1983)	Lucky Spell (1971)	Incantation (1965)
Dam Stop Traffic (1993)	Cure the Blues (1978)	Stop The Music (1970)	Hail To Reason (1958)
Dam Stop Traffic (1993)	Cure the Blues (1978)	Stop The Music (1970)	Bebopper (1962)
Dam Stop Traffic (1993)	Cure the Blues (1978)	Quick Cure (1971)	Dr. Fager (1964)
Dam Stop Traffic (1993)	Cure the Blues (1978)	Quick Cure (1971)	Spedwell (1960)
Dam Stop Traffic (1993)	Save My Soul (1983)	I'ma Hell Raiser (1977)	Raise a Native (1961)
Dam Stop Traffic (1993)	Save My Soul (1983)	I'ma Hell Raiser (1977)	I'm for Mama (1967)
Dam Stop Traffic (1993)	Save My Soul (1983)	Somethingexciting (1978)	Shecky Greene (1970)
Dam Stop Traffic (1993)	Save My Soul (1983)	Somethingexciting (1978)	Queen of Dakota (1968) (family 4-e)
