= Cross traffic =

Cross traffic may refer to:

- Intersection (road), a junction where two or more roads converge, diverge, meet or cross at the same height

Other:

- Cross Traffic (horse), an American Thoroughbred race horse
