= Rampart Stakes =

- Class: Listed
- Location: Gulfstream Park; Hallandale Beach, Florida, United States
- Inaugurated: 1976
- Race type: Thoroughbred – Flat racing
- Website: www.gulfstreampark.com

Race information
- Distance: 1 mile (8 furlongs, 1.61 km)
- Surface: Dirt
- Track: left-handed
- Qualification: Fillies & Mares, three-years-old & up
- Weight: 123 lbs. (55.8 kg) / Allowances
- Purse: US$100,000

The Rampart Stakes is an American Thoroughbred horse race run annually at Gulfstream Park in Hallandale Beach, Florida. A Listed event open to fillies and mares age four and up, it is contested over a distance of one and one-eighth miles on dirt.

Moon Glitter won the April 14, 1976 inaugural running of the Rampart Handicap which was run at a distance of seven furlongs for that year only.

Unrivaled Belle won the 2010 edition of the Rampart and went on to win that year's Breeders' Cup Ladies' Classic.

As a result of a sponsorship arrangement, the Rampart was run as the Johnny Walker Black Classic in 1989 and 1990. In 2021 the event was downgraded to a Listed event.

== Records ==
Speed record:

- 1:35.03 @ 1 mile: Letruska (2020)
- 1:42.00 @ 1-1/16 miles: Nine Keys (1994)
- 1:47.92 @ 1-1/8 miles: Allamerican Bertie (2003)

Most wins:

- * 2 - Awesome Maria (2011, 2012)

Most wins by a jockey:

- 4 - Jerry Bailey (1992, 1993, 1999, 2004)
- 4 - John Velazquez (2003, 2011, 2012, 2013)

Most wins by a trainer:

- 5 - Todd Pletcher (2006, 2011, 2012, 2013, 2016)

Most wins by an owner:

- 2 - Bertram W. Klein (2001, 2003)
- 2 - E. Paul Robsham Stables (2011, 2012)

== Winners ==
Gulfstream Park

Year	Winner	Age	Jockey	Trainer	Owner	Dist. (Miles)	Time	Win $	Gr.
2021	Dance d'Oro	4	Emisael Jaramillo	Ralph Nicks	Whisper Hill Farm	1 m	1:35.92	$62,000	G3
2020	Letruska	4	Emisael Jaramillo	Fausto Gutierrez	St. George Stable LLC	1 m	1:35.03	$61,380	G3
2019	Pink Sands	4	José Ortiz	C. R. McGaughey III	Gainsway Stable (Antony Beck) & Andrew Rosen	1 m	1:36.20	$58,900	G3
2018	Tequilita	4	Luis Saez	Michael R. Matz	Dorothy Matz	1 m	1:37.62	$67,760	G3
2017	Lewis Bay	4	Irad Ortiz Jr.	Chad C. Brown	Alpha Delta Stables LLC (Jon Clay)	1 m	1:36.14	$60,760	G3
2016	Eskenformoney	4	Javier Castellano	Todd Pletcher	StarLadies Racing (Laurie Wolf, managing partner)	1 m	1:35.47	$60,760	G3
2015 †	House Rules	4	Javier Castellano	James A. Jerkens	Joseph V. Shields Jr.	1 m	1:36.93	$60,760	G3
2015 Ŧ	Cali Star	4	Tyler Gaffalione	Martin D. Wolfson	Ben Walden Jr. & Larry Taylor	1 m	1:36.35	$60,140	G3
2014	Gamay Noir	4	Paco Lopez	Martin D. Wolfson	Chasing Tail Stables LLC (Myron Miller)	1-1/8 m	1:49.84	$90,000	G3
2013	Ciao Bella	4	John Velazquez	Todd Pletcher	Michael B. Tabor	1-1/8 m	1:50.06	$90,000	G3
2012	Awesome Maria	5	John Velazquez	Todd Pletcher	E. Paul Robsham Stables	1-1/8 m	1:48.19	$90,000	G3
2011	Awesome Maria	4	John Velazquez	Todd Pletcher	E. Paul Robsham Stables	1-1/8 m	1:49.09	$90,000	G3
2010	Unrivaled Belle	4	Kent Desormeaux	William I. Mott	Gary Seidler & Peter Vegso	1-1/8 m	1:49.36	$90,000	G3
2009	One Caroline	4	Edgar Prado	George R. Arnold II	G. Watts Humphrey Jr.	1-1/8 m	1:48.88	$90,000	G2
2008	Spring Waltz	5	Javier Castellano	Brian A. Lynch	Stronach Stables	1-1/8 m	1:49.73	$120,000	G2
2007	Miss Shop	4	Rafael Bejarano	H. Allen Jerkens	Hobeau Farm	1-1/8 m	1:49.42	$120,000	G2
2006	Oonagh Maccool	4	Rafael Bejarano	Todd Pletcher	Charles H. Wacker III	1-1/8 m	1:49.99	$120,000	G2
2005	D' Wildcat Speed	5	Manoel Cruz	William P. White	Establo P. R. Speed	1-1/8 m	1:48.94	$120,000	G2
2004	Sightseek	5	Jerry Bailey	Robert J. Frankel	Juddmonte Farms	1-1/8 m	1:51.07	$120,000	G2
2003	Allamerican Bertie	4	John Velazquez	Steven B. Flint	Bertram W. Klein et al.	1-1/8 m	1:47.92	$120,000	G2
2002	Forest Secrets	4	Pat Day	John T. Ward Jr.	Debby M. Oxley	1-1/8 m	1:49.83	$120,000	G2
2001	De Bertie	4	Jorge Chavez	Bernard S. Flint	Bertram W. Klein et al.	1-1/8 m	1:50.48	$120,000	G2
2000	Bella Chiarra	5	Shane Sellers	Patrick B. Byrne	Jack Mandato	1-1/16 m	1:43.27	$120,000	G2
1999	Banshee Breeze	4	Jerry Bailey	Carl Nafzger	James B. Tafel	1-1/16 m	1:42.83	$120,000	G2
1998	Dance for Thee	4	Joe Bravo	Leo A. Azpurua Jr.	John A. Franks	1-1/16 m	1:44.60	$120,000	G2
1997	Chip	4	Joe Bravo	Sonny Hine	Carolyn Hine	1-1/16 m	1:42.40	$120,000	G2
1996	Investalot	5	Shane Sellers	John K. Hennig	John R. & Martha J. Mulholland	1-1/16 m	1:43.80	$120,000	G2
1995	Educated Risk	5	Mike E. Smith	C. R. McGaughey III	Ogden Mills Phipps	1-1/16 m	1:43.00	$120,000	G2
1994	Nine Keys	4	Mike E. Smith	Angel Penna Jr.	Lazy F Ranch	1-1/16 m	1:42.00	$120,000	G2
1993	Girl On a Mission	4	Jerry Bailey	Roger Attfield	Aly Larson	1-1/16 m	1:45.40	$120,000	G2
1992	Fit for a Queen	6	Jerry Bailey	C. R. McGaughey III	Hermitage Farm LLC (Carl F. Pollard)	1-1/16 m	1:43.60	$120,000	G2
1991	Charon	4	Craig Perret	Eugene Navarro	Stanley M. Ersoff	1-1/16 m	1:43.00	$120,000	G2
1990	Barbarika	5	Craig Perret	Philip M. Hauswald	Fares Farms (Issam Michael Fares)	1-1/16 m	1:44.20	$120,000	G2
1989	Colonial Waters	4	Herb McCauley	Ross R. Pearce	Buckland Farm	1-1/16 m	1:44.80	$120,000	G2
1988	By Land by Sea	4	Fernando Toro	Gary F. Jones	Jayeff B. Stable (Richard Santulli & George Prussin) & Brereton C. Jones	1-1/16 m	1:43.80	$103,080	G2
1987	Life at the Top	4	Randy Romero	D. Wayne Lukas	Gene Klein & Lloyd R. French Jr.	1-1/16 m	1:44.00	$97,440	G3
1986	Endear	4	Eddie Maple	Woody Stephens	Claiborne Farm	1-1/16 m	1:45.80	$103,080	G3
1985	Isayso	6	Eddie Maple	Michael O. Chamblee	Judie Nichols	1-1/16 m	1:44.20	$70,080	
1984	Thinghatab	4	Craig Perret	Warren A. Croll Jr.	Pelican Stable (Rachel Carpenter)	1-1/16 m	1:43.80	$36,870	
1983	Flag Waver	4	Alex Solis	Robert J. Reinacher Jr.	Greentree Stable	1-1/16 m	1:44.00	$57,960	
1982	Sweetest Chant	4	Earlie Fires	Joseph M. Bollero	Russel L. Reineman Stables	1-1/16 m	1:43.40	$25,662	
1981	Wistful	4	Don Brumfield	Anthony J. Bardaro	Bright View Farm (Christine Connelly)	1-1/16 m	1:44.60	$54,180	
1977	1980	Race not held							
1976	Moon Glitter	4	Earlie Fires	Joseph M. Bollero	Frank D. Turner	7 f	1:22.20	$9,960	

- † run February 21, 2015.
- Ŧ run December 12, 2015
