= Blind Luck =

American-bred Thoroughbred racehorse

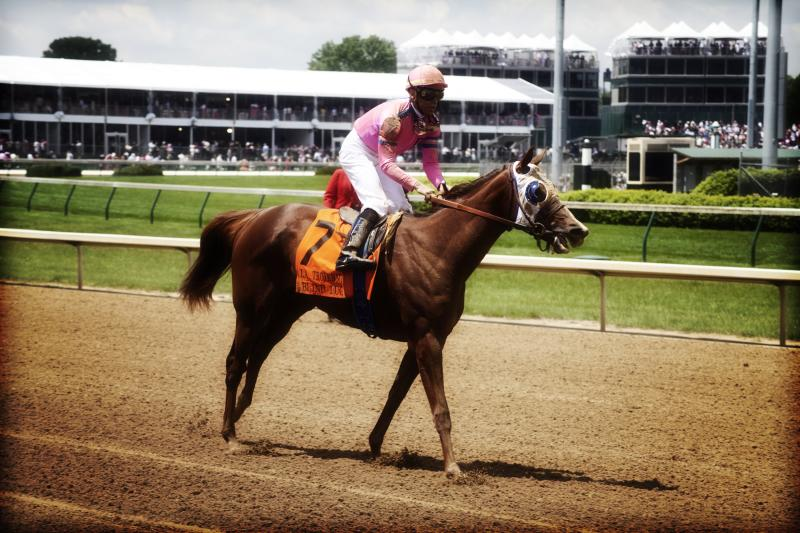
- Blind Luck at 2011 La Troienne Stakes with Garrett Gomez up.
- Sire: Pollard's Vision
- Grandsire: Carson City
- Dam: Lucky One
- Damsire: Best of Luck
- Sex: Filly
- Foaled: 2007
- Died: 2024
- Country: United States
- Colour: Chestnut
- Breeder: Fairlawn Farm
- Owner: Hollendorfer/Dedomenico/Carver/Abruzzo
- Trainer: Jerry Hollendorfer
- Record: 22: 12-7-2
- Earnings: US$ 3,279,520

Major wins
- Oak Leaf Stakes (2009); Hollywood Starlet Stakes (2009); Las Virgenes Stakes (2010); Fantasy Stakes (2010); Kentucky Oaks (2010); Delaware Oaks (2010); Alabama Stakes (2010); La Troienne Stakes (2011); Vanity Invitational Handicap (2011); Delaware Handicap (2011)

Awards
- American Champion Three-Year-Old Filly (2010)
- Last updated on May 6, 2011

Blind Luck (foaled April 20, 2007 in Kentucky) was an American Champion Thoroughbred racehorse.

== Background ==
Blind Luck is a daughter of Pollard's Vision, winner of the Illinois Derby and the Lone Star Derby, and Lucky One.

Blind Luck was purchased for $11,000 as a yearling at the Fasig-Tipton Kentucky Select Sale of 2008 and is now owned by her trainer, Jerry Hollendorfer, as well as Mark Dedomenico, John Carver, and Peter Abruzzo.

== Racing career ==
=== 2009: two-year-old season ===
Blind Luck won four of her six juvenile starts. Two of her wins were in Grade I stakes races: the Oak Leaf Stakes and the Hollywood Starlet Stakes. She also placed third in the Grade I Breeders' Cup Juvenile Fillies behind Shebewild and second in the Grade I Del Mar Debutante Stakes to Mi Sueno.

=== 2010: three-year-old season ===
Blind Luck made her 3-year-old debut a winning one in the Grade I Las Virgenes Stakes, where she rallied to win by a nose over Evening Jewel. In the Grade I, $250,000 Santa Anita Oaks, she closed well but was trapped on the inside until the final sixteenth of a mile. She rallied but fell short by 3/4 lengths, coming in third behind Crisp and All Due Respect. In the Grade II Fantasy Stakes at Oaklawn Park on April 3, she won as a come-from-behind favorite, taking the race by 2½ lengths. The 136th running of the Grade I Kentucky Oaks took place on April 30, 2010, on Churchill Downs' traditional dirt course. Blind Luck was listed as a 6-5 morning-line favorite in a field of 14 and broke from post 5 with regular jockey Rafael Bejarano aboard. After checking in last for the first half of the race, she came home strongly to catch Evening Jewel at the wire to win the Oaks. Her time for the 1 1/8-mile race was 1:50.70.

Blind Luck returned to racing in the first week in June in the Grade II Hollywood Oaks. There she lost by 1½ lengths to Switch when unable to catch that rival in the stretch. She then shipped into Delaware Park for the Grade II Delaware Oaks, which she won by a nose over Havre de Grace in late-running fashion. She remained undefeated on dirt and won over a sloppy track. In the Grade I, 1 1/4-mile Alabama Stakes at Saratoga on August 21, a showdown between Blind Luck and the odds-on choice, Devil May Care, believed to be the best 3-year-old filly on the East Coast, never materialized as Devil May Care finished 4th. Instead Blind Luck ran down Havre de Grace, her foe from the Delaware Oaks, to win by a neck.

On October 2, Blind Luck faced Havre de Grace again in the Grade II Cotillion Stakes at Parx. Second choice Havre de Grace held off Blind Luck by a neck. Blind Luck took on older fillies and mares for the first time in the Grade I Breeders' Cup Ladies Classic at Churchill Downs. Racing under lights for the first time, she settled in 10th position in the 11-horse field. Forced to chase a slow pace, Blind Luck released her customary rally only to come up 1 3/4 lengths short of 4-year-old filly Unrivaled Belle, while Havre de Grace was 3rd.

=== 2011: four-year-old season ===
In her 4-year-old debut, Blind Luck started in the Grade II El Encino Stakes at Santa Anita Park, finishing second to Always a Princess. She again finished second to Always a Princess in the Grade II La Cañada Stakes at Santa Anita Park. On March 19, Blind Luck renewed her rivalry with Havre De Grace in the Grade III Azeri Stakes at Oaklawn Park. This time Havre De Grace won, leaving their race record against each other as Blind Luck with two wins and Havre De Grace with two. (Blind Luck also finished second to Havre De Grace's third in the 2010 Breeders' Cup Ladies Classic). Blind Luck's connections opted to skip the Grade I Apple Blossom Handicap, which Havre De Grace won over California filly Switch. Snapping a five-race losing streak, on May 6, Blind Luck took the Grade II La Troienne Stakes at Churchill Downs, catching 2010 Breeders' Cup Ladies Classic winner and reigning American Champion Older Female Unrivaled Belle in the final strides after stumbling badly at the start. Rallying from last, Blink Luck won her 6th career Grade I in the Vanity Handicap at Hollywood Park. She won the Delaware Handicap by a nose over her archrival Havre de Grace after a lengthy stretch duel. This put their race record at 3 wins for Blind Luck and 2 for Havre de Grace. Life at Ten, 2010's Delaware Handicap winner, finished 18 1/2 lengths further back in third.

Blind Luck returned to the races on October 1 in the Lady's Secret Stakes at Santa Anita's autumn meeting. After breaking slowly as usual, she dropped far behind and lost contact with the field on the second turn. She finished an uncharacteristic last in the field of seven fillies and mares, the first time in her career she had been worse than third. This poor performance kept her out of the Breeders' Cup. Tests and scans taken on her reportedly revealed that nothing was physically wrong.

== Breeding ==
On January 27, 2012, Blind Luck was officially retired from racing and booked to Darley stallion Bernardini. She delivered a filly named I'm The Reason on January 19, 2013.

On February 6, 2014, Blind Luck delivered a colt by Giant's Causeway named I'm a Lucky Guy. She gave birth to her third foal, a filly by Giant's Causeway, on January 15, 2016. She was Bred to Curlin for 2018

== Races ==
Finish	Race	Distance	Jockey	Time	Grade	Runner up/Winner	Track
7th	Lady's Secret Stakes	1 1/16 m	Garrett Gomez	1:41.59	I	Zazu	Santa Anita Park
1st	Delaware Handicap	1 1/4 m	Garrett Gomez	2:01.28	II	Havre de Grace	Delaware Park
1st	Vanity Handicap	1 1/8 m	Garrett Gomez	1:50.89	I	Switch	Hollywood Park
1st	La Troienne Stakes	1 1/16 m	Garrett Gomez	1:42.93	II	Unrivaled Belle	Churchill Downs
2nd	Azeri Stakes	1 1/16 m	G. Gomez	1:42.02	III	Havre De Grace	Oaklawn Park
2nd	La Cañada Stakes	1 1/8 m	R. Bejarano	1:48.36	II	Always a Princess	Santa Anita Park
2nd	El Encino Stakes	1 1/16 m	J. Rosario	1:41.47	II	Always a Princess	Santa Anita Park
2nd	Breeders' Cup Ladies Classic	1 1/8 m	J. Rosario	1:50.04	I	Unrivaled Belle	Churchill Downs
2nd	Fitz Dixon Cotillion	1 1/16 m	J. Rosario	1:40.93	II	Havre De Grace	Parx Race Track
1st	Alabama Stakes	1 1/4 m	J. Rosario	2:03.89	I	Havre De Grace	Saratoga Race Track
1st	Delaware Oaks	1 1/16 m	J. Rosario	1:43.34	II	Havre De Grace	Delaware Race Track
2nd	Hollywood Oaks	1 1/16 m	R. Bejarano	1:44.54	II	Switch	Hollywood Park
1st	Kentucky Oaks	1 1/8 m	R. Bejarano	1:50.70	I	Evening Jewel	Churchill Downs
1st	Fantasy Stakes	1 1/16 m	R. Bejarano	1:42.56	II	Tidal Pool	Oaklawn Park
3rd	Santa Anita Oaks	1 1/16 m	R. Bejarano	1:43.50	I	Switch	Santa Anita
1st	Las Virgenes Stakes	1m	R. Bejarano	1:35.98	I	Evening Jewel	Santa Anita
1st	Hollywood Starlet Stakes	1 1/16 m	R. Bejarano	1:41.96	I	Miss Heather Lee	Hollywood Park
3rd	Breeders' Cup Juvenile Fillies	1 1/16 m	T. Baze	1:43.80	I	She Be Wild	Oak Tree at Santa Anita
1st	Oak Leaf Stakes	1 1/16 m	T. Baze	1:43.19	I	Always a Princess	Oak Tree at Santa Anita
2nd	Del Mar Debutante Stakes	7 F	T. Baze	1:23.78	I	Mi Sueno	Del Mar
1st	Allowance	5.5 F	J. Rosario	1:04.84	None	Sam's Special	Del Mar
1st	Maiden	4.5 F	L. Arango	0:53.25	None	The Pia Angel	Calder
