= Unrivaled Belle =

American-bred Thoroughbred racehorse

- Sire: Unbridled's Song
- Grandsire: Unbridled
- Dam: Queenie Belle
- Damsire: Bertrando
- Sex: Filly
- Foaled: 2006
- Country: United States
- Colour: Gray
- Breeder: Gary Seidler & Peter Vegso
- Owner: Gary Seidler & Peter Vegso
- Trainer: William I. Mott
- Record: 14: 6-6-1
- Earnings: $$1,854,706

Major wins
- Real Prize Stakes (2009); Rampart Stakes (2010); La Troienne Stakes (2010); Breeders' Cup wins: Breeders' Cup Ladies' Classic (2010)
- Last updated on April 30, 2010

Unrivaled Belle (foaled 2006) is a gray/roan American Thoroughbred racehorse owned and bred in Kentucky by Gary Seidler & Peter Vegso. She is a daughter of champion sire and champion racehorse Unbridled's Song, a descendant of the very influential sire Mr. Prospector, out of the Grade II winner Queenie Belle (Bertrando). She was listed as sold for $260,000 at Keeneland September.

== Racing career ==
Unrivaled Belle won her first stakes race in the $66150 Real Prize Stakes for 3-year-old fillies at Belmont a 6¾-length win over Banker's Buy. In November of her 3 year old season, she finished second to Flashing.

At 4, she won the Rampart Stakes, then on April 30, defeated 2009 American Horse of the Year Rachel Alexandra to win the La Troienne Stakes at Churchill Downs by a head.

She won the 2010 Breeders' Cup Ladies Classic over favorite Blind Luck, who finished 2nd.

== Retirement ==
Unrivaled Belle was retired from racing in June 2011, minutes before the running of the Ogden Phipps Handicap. She flipped over in the paddock and broke the bones in her withers. She retired to broodmare duty in 2012. As of 2016, she has produced two fillies: Meseika (2013) by Megdalio d'Oro, and multiple stakes-winner Unique Bella (2014) by Tapit.
