= Ashland Oaks =

American Thoroughbred horse race

- Class: Discontinued stakes
- Location: Lexington Race Course; Lexington, Kentucky, United States
- Inaugurated: 1879
- Race type: Thoroughbred – Flat racing

Race information
- Distance: 1 1/16 miles (8.5 furlongs)
- Surface: Dirt
- Track: left-handed
- Qualification: Three-year-old fillies

The Ashland Oaks was an American Thoroughbred horse race run from 1879 through 1896 and 1912 through 1932 at the Kentucky Association's Lexington Race Course. A race for three-year-olds fillies, during its tenure it was contested at various distances on dirt. The event was named in honor of Thomas Clay McDowell's Ashland estate at Lexington, the original homestead and breeding farm of his great-grandfather, statesman Henry Clay. In addition to a share of the purse money, the winning owner received a Cup donated by McDowell.

== Historical notes ==
Distances:

- 1 1/2 miles: 1879–1882
- 1 1/4 miles: 1883–1889
- 1 mile: 1890–1926
- 1 1/16 miles: 1927–1931
- 1 mile, 70 yards: 1932

The economic depression in the United States that followed the Panic of 1893 led to difficulties in attracting horses for important events. After the 1896 running of the Ashland Oaks, reporting by The New York Times described the race as a farce after it drew only two entries. The problems meant there would be no Ashland Oaks run for the next fifteen years. As a result of New York State's Hart–Agnew Law, racing was completely shut down in New York during 1911 and 1912. That situation provided the Lexington track with the opportunity to revive the Ashland Oaks and it was added to the schedule for May 1, 1912. The race was won by the New York filly Sprite, owned by Wall Street stockbroker Harry K. Knapp. Sprite defeated Azyiade, owned by Harry Hallenbeck another New York City businessman. Trainer William Karrick then took the Hallenbeck stable to Churchill Downs where ten days later they won the 1912 Kentucky Derby with the colt, Worth.

The final edition of the Ashland took place on April 20, 1932, and was run as an overnight allowance purse. It was won by Parfait, owned by the Dixiana Farm Stable of Detroit auto body manufacturer Charles T. Fisher.

The Kentucky Association racetrack closed in the spring of 1933 and its facilities were torn down in 1935. When the new Keeneland Race Course opened in 1936, the track created their replacement for the Ashland Oaks with another race for fillies they called the Ashland Stakes.
