= Evening Jewel =

American Thoroughbred racehorse

- Sire: Northern Afleet
- Grandsire: Afleet
- Dam: Jewel of the Night
- Damsire: Giant's Causeway
- Sex: Filly
- Foaled: 2007
- Country: United States
- Colour: Bay
- Breeder: Betty L. Mabee and Larry Mabee
- Owner: Braly Family Trust
- Trainer: James M. Cassidy
- Record: 19: 7-6-2
- Earnings: $1,221,399

Major wins
- California Breeders' Cup (2009); Ashland Stakes (2010); Honeymoon Handicap (2010); Del Mar Oaks (2010); San Clemente Handicap (2010); Sunshine Millions Distaff (2011)

Evening Jewel (foaled February 26, 2007, in California) is an American Thoroughbred racehorse by Northern Afleet out of Jewel of the Night by Giant's Causeway. Northern Afleet is also the sire of 2005 Preakness Stakes and Belmont Stakes winner Afleet Alex. Evening Jewel was bred by Betty L. Mabee and her son Larry Mabee, trained by James M. Cassidy, and owned by the Braly Family Trust.

Evening Jewel's dam, Jewel of the Night, is a daughter of Jeweled Lady (General Meeting-Excellent Lady), who is a full sister to the Grade 1 winner General Challenge and listed stakes winner Western Hemisphere, and a three-quarters sister to the Grade 1 winner Notable Career.

Evening Jewel was initially purchased at the 2008 Keeneland September Yearling Sale for $8,000 and was privately sold to the Braly Family Trust for $132,500 as a two-year-old.

Said to have a "nice front running fashion", on April 3, 2010, she proved worthy of that year's Kentucky Oaks when she took the Grade I Ashland Stakes. The Ashland Stakes was the third win in the ten starts of Evening Jewel's career, and it improved her earnings to $410,600.

== 2010 Kentucky Oaks ==
In the Kentucky Oaks, run on April 30 (the day before the Kentucky Derby), Evening Jewel faced heavily favored Blind Luck. Beaten by a nose by Blind Luck earlier in the year in the Las Virgenes Stakes, she looked to turn the tables on that rival.

Evening Jewel drew post 11 for the Kentucky Oaks and was installed at 10-to-1 odds in the morning line and ridden by regular jockey Kent Desormeaux. After leading most of the way, she was again beaten a nose by eventual champion 3-year-old filly Blind Luck.

== Turf racing ==
On May 31, 2010, Evening Jewel took the Honeymoon Handicap in her turf debut, and on August 21, 2010, she took her second Grade I turf win by winning the Del Mar Oaks. She suffered her first loss on turf on October 16, 2010, finishing 3rd in the Grade 1 Queen Elizabeth II Challenge Cup Stakes at Keeneland.

== Versatile filly ==
At age 3, Evening Jewel won Grade 1 races on synthetic and turf surfaces, and finished 2nd by a nose in her only start on dirt, the Grade 1 Kentucky Oaks.
