= Mr Speaker (horse) =

American thoroughbred racehorse

- Sire: Pulpit
- Grandsire: A.P. Indy
- Dam: Salute
- Damsire: Unbridled
- Foaled: May 14, 2011
- Country: USA
- Breeder: Phipps Stable
- Owner: Phipps Stable
- Trainer: Claude R. McGaughey III
- Jockey: Jose L. Ortiz
- Record: 18:6-1-2
- Earnings: $1,247,544

Major wins
- Belmont Derby (2014)

Mr Speaker (foaled May 14, 2011) is an American Thoroughbred racehorse and the winner of the 2011 Belmont Derby.

== Career ==
Mr Speaker's first race was on August 24, 2013, at Saratoga, where he came in 6th. He had his first win, after three races, on October 14, 2013, at Belmont Park.

On December 21, 2013, he had his first stakes win at the Grade-3 Dania Beach Stakes. He came into the race at 10:1 odds and defeated Cabo Cat for the victory. He finished the 2013 season with this win.

To start the 2014 season, he came in a disappointing 7th at the Grade-2 Holy Bull Stakes and 2nd at the Grade-3 Palm Beach Stakes.

He had his first win of the 2014 season when he won the Grade-3 Lexington Stakes on April 19, 2014. He defeated Divine Oath by four lengths at 2:1 odds as the favorite.

On May 26, 2014, he came in a disappointing 5th-place finish at the Penning Ridge Stakes. This loss was overshadowed as, on July 5, 2014, he won the Grade-1 Belmont Derby. He came into the race at 23:1 odds, the second to worst odds in the field. The win gained his owners a $1,250,000 million dollar purse after he edged Adelaide near the finish.

The Belmont Derby win was his last win for over a year until he won a much less impressive Allowance Optional Claiming race at Woodbine on July 15, 2015.

He came in 4th at the August 16, 2015, Grade-2 Sky Classic Stakes and had the final win of his career on September 19, 2015, at the Commonwealth Turf Cup. He defeated Cut to Order and Legendary as the race favorite at 2:1 odds.

He finished his career on November 14, 2015, after a 5th-place finish at the Red Smith Stakes. He was officially retired in late November 2015 and started his breeding career by standing stud at Lane’s End Farm for the 2016 season.

== Pedigree ==
Pedigree of Mr Speaker (USA), 2011
Sire Pulpit (USA) b. 1994	A.P. Indy (USA) b. 1989	Seattle Slew	Bold Reasoning
Sire Pulpit (USA) b. 1994	A.P. Indy (USA) b. 1989	Seattle Slew	My Charmer
Sire Pulpit (USA) b. 1994	A.P. Indy (USA) b. 1989	Weekend Surprise	Secretariat
Sire Pulpit (USA) b. 1994	A.P. Indy (USA) b. 1989	Weekend Surprise	Lassie Dear
Sire Pulpit (USA) b. 1994	Preach (USA) b. 1989	Mr. Prospector	Raise a Native
Sire Pulpit (USA) b. 1994	Preach (USA) b. 1989	Mr. Prospector	Gold Digger
Sire Pulpit (USA) b. 1994	Preach (USA) b. 1989	Narrate	Honest Pleasure
Sire Pulpit (USA) b. 1994	Preach (USA) b. 1989	Narrate	State
Dam Salute (USA) b. 2002	Unbridled (USA) b. 1987	Fappiano	Mr. Prospector
Dam Salute (USA) b. 2002	Unbridled (USA) b. 1987	Fappiano	Killaloe
Dam Salute (USA) b. 2002	Unbridled (USA) b. 1987	Gana Facil	Le Fabuleux
Dam Salute (USA) b. 2002	Unbridled (USA) b. 1987	Gana Facil	Charedi
Dam Salute (USA) b. 2002	Personal Ensign (USA) b. 1984	Private Account	Damascus
Dam Salute (USA) b. 2002	Personal Ensign (USA) b. 1984	Private Account	Numbered Account
Dam Salute (USA) b. 2002	Personal Ensign (USA) b. 1984	Grecian Banner	Hoist The Flag
Dam Salute (USA) b. 2002	Personal Ensign (USA) b. 1984	Grecian Banner	Dorine
