= Halfbridled =

American-bred Thoroughbred racehorse

- Sire: Unbridled
- Grandsire: Fappiano
- Dam: Half Queen
- Damsire: Deputy Minister
- Sex: Filly
- Foaled: 2001
- Country: United States
- Colour: Dark bay or brown
- Breeder: Wertheimer et Frère
- Owner: Wertheimer et Frère
- Trainer: Richard Mandella
- Record: 6:4-2-0
- Earnings: $959,400

Major wins
- Del Mar Debutante Stakes (2003); Oak Leaf Stakes (2003); Breeders' Cup Juvenile Fillies (2003)

Awards
- U.S. Champion 2-Yr-Old Filly (2003)
- Last updated on November 26, 2006

Halfbridled (foaled February 2, 2001 in Kentucky) is an American Thoroughbred racehorse who was the 2003 American Champion Two-Year-Old Filly.

== Background ==
Halfbridled is a bay mare bred by in Kentucky by the French-based Wertheimer et Frère, who also owned her during her racing career. She was sired by Unbridled, winner of the 1990 Kentucky Derby and Eclipse Eclipse Champion Three-Year-Old Male, and was out of the Deputy Minister mare Half Queen.

She was trained by Richard E. Mandella.

== Racing career ==
=== 2003: Two-year-old season ===
She won her debut in a Maiden Special Weight at Del Mar Racetrack, and then defeated five opponents Grade 1 Del Mar Debutante Stakes including Hollywood Story and Victory USA.

She then won the Grade 2 Oak Leaf Stakes at Santa Anita Park, a prep for the Breeders' Cup World Championships. She faced six rivals including Hollywood Story again.

Entering the Breeders' Cup Juvenile Fillies undefeated, Halfbridled started as the 2-1 favorite in a field of fourteen. She drew the farthest post from the rail, #14. She won under her usual jockey, Hall of Fame rider Julie Krone.

Halfbridled was named the Eclipse Champion 2-Year-Old Filly.

=== 2004: Three-year-old season ===
Halfbridled made her sophomore debut in the Santa Anita Oaks, finishing second behind Composure.

Next she contested the Beaumont Stakes, again finishing second in what was her final race. After the Beaumont Stakes, it was discovered that Halfbridled had sustained an injury to her canon bone and would be sidelined for the rest of the season.

The following November, after supposedly healing from her injury, Halfbridled returned to training to prepare for the 2005 racing season. During a gallop it was realized that the filly never truly healed from her injury, and the decision was made to retire her.

== Breeding career ==
After her retirement from racing, Halfbridled began her career as a broodmare. She delivered her first foal, a bay filly by Giant's Causeway, in 2007. She was later sent to Europe.

Her offspring include:

- Half Strike (2009 gelding by Smart Strike) - a five-time winner with earnings of over $100,000
- Humoristica (2011 filly by Distorted Humor) - a winner with earnings of $38,345
- Pas Prete (GB) (2014 filly by More Than Ready)- a winner with earnings of €22,300
- Gianthalf (2010 filly by Giant's Causeway) - non winner of two starts, now a broodmare
- Halfcause (2007 filly by Giant's Causeway) - non winner of 7 starts, now a broodmare
- Primaprima (2013 filly by More Than Ready) - unraced, now a broodmare
- A.P. Few- (2008 filly by A.P. Indy) - unraced, now a broodmare
