= Kentucky Association =

Horse racing association and racetrack

Coordinates: 38°02′47″N 84°28′48″W

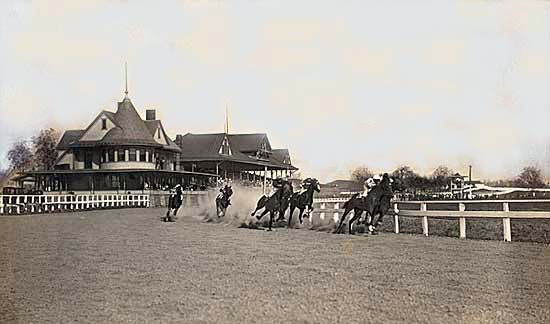
Lexington Race Course, 1920

The Kentucky Association (also known as the Kentucky Racing Association) was formed on July 23, 1826, to promote the breeding and racing of Thoroughbred horses in the Bluegrass region of Kentucky. The "oldest turf organization in America", it was founded by a group of prominent locals, who included planter and politician Henry Clay, Jesse Bledsoe, Dr. Elisha Warfield, and Thomas F. Marshall. Between 1828 and 1834, the Association acquired 65 acres of land in an area of the city of Lexington, Kentucky that today is the east end of 5th Street at Race Street. On the property, the Association built the Lexington Race Course, a one-mile dirt racetrack with grandstand and stables to host Thoroughbred flat racing events.

== Financial difficulties and sale ==
After more than six decades of success, financial problems led to the track being sold in 1890 to a group of investors. The economic depression following the Panic of 1893 was a serious blow, and financial difficulties plagued the new owners. Given the low economy, they had difficulty attracting horses for important events such as the 1896 Ashland Oaks, which the New York Times described as a farce after it drew only two entries. Facing imminent foreclosure, on March 18, 1897, the track was put up for sale. The status of the track remained in limbo for four years until Charles Green of St. Louis, Missouri, who had been a Trustee for the stockholders, purchased the track in 1901 for $1 plus other considerations.

== April 1906 fire ==
In April 1906 a fire broke out at the track, which quickly spread to the surrounding private residences. Eighteen area homes were destroyed.

== Notable events ==
The Phoenix Stakes, now the oldest stakes race in the United States, was first run in 1831 as the Phoenix Hotel Handicap at the Kentucky Association track. Similarly, the Ben Ali Handicap was run from 1917 through 1932. The name would be revived at Keeneland in 1937. Other important races inaugurated there and still run today, include the Ashland Oaks, revived as the Ashland Stakes, which was named for Henry Clay's Ashland estate; plus the Breeders' Futurity Stakes (1910), the Blue Grass Stakes (1911).

Some of the notable events that took place at the Kentucky Association Racetrack include:

- On September 16, 1876, future Hall of Fame jockey Isaac Burns Murphy earned his first win.
- In 1898 Hall of Fame jockey Jimmy Winkfield got his start.
- On January 27, 1921, the champion stallion Man o' War arrived in Kentucky. Prior to beginning stud duty at Hinata Farm near Lexington, he was installed at Edward R. Bradley's stable at the Kentucky Association racetrack. A crowd gathered to watch him exercise gallop.

== Management and new ownership ==
Past presidents of the racetrack include John C. Breckinridge and General Leslie Combs.

During 1918–1919, the Kentucky Jockey Club was created to take over the four racetracks in the state, consisting of the Lexington Race Course, Churchill Downs, Latonia Race Track, and the Douglas Park Racetrack.

The Kentucky Association closed the racetrack in the spring of 1933 and its facilities were torn down in 1935. On April 17, 1933, articles of incorporation were filed for the Keeneland Association; their new racecourse opened in 1935, located about six miles outside of Lexington. Today city roads Versailles and Man O' War Boulevard intersect at one corner. The Kentucky Association racetrack's historic gates were replicated at the Keeneland Race Course.

The historical records for the Kentucky Association (1828 to c.1935) are maintained at the University of Kentucky library's Special Collections & Digital Programs Division.
