= Banshee Breeze =

American-bred Thoroughbred racehorse

- Banshee Breeze's grave at Claiborne Farm
- Sire: Unbridled
- Grandsire: Fappiano
- Dam: Banshee Winds
- Damsire: Known Fact
- Sex: Mare
- Foaled: 1995
- Country: United States
- Colour: Bay
- Breeder: James B. Tafel
- Owner: Jayeff B. Stables, James B. Tafel, Richard Santulli
- Trainer: Carl Nafzger
- Record: 18: 10-5-2
- Earnings: US$2,784,798

Major wins
- Alabama Stakes (1998); Coaching Club American Oaks (1998); Spinster Stakes (1998); Bonnie Miss Stakes (1998); Apple Blossom Handicap (1999); Fleur de Lis Handicap (1999); Go for Wand Handicap (1999); Rampart Handicap (1999)

Awards
- American Champion Three-Year-Old Filly (1998)

Banshee Breeze (1995–2001) was an American Champion Thoroughbred racehorse. A winner of five Grade 1 races, she was voted the 1998 American Champion Three-Year-Old Filly.

== Background ==
Banshee Breeze was bred in Kentucky by James B. Tafel. She was her mother's, Banshee Winds, first foal. Her sire was Unbridled, the winner of the 1990 Kentucky Derby and Breeders' Cup Classic.

== Racing career ==
Banshee Breeze only raced once as a two-year-old, coming seventh in a maiden race at Churchill Downs. Her three-year-old debut was a maiden race at Gulfstream Park, which she won by 3 ¾ lengths. She then won an allowance race by eight lengths.

Banshee Breeze won her first graded stakes on March 16, 1998, the Bonnie Miss Stakes. Her trainer was doubtful she was ready for the race, but Doug Bredar, stakes coordinator at Gulfstream Park at the time, persuaded him she belonged in the field. Banshee Breeze ended up winning by 11 ½ lengths. She then came third in the Ashland Stakes. Banshee Breeze next raced in the Kentucky Oaks, but lost by a neck to the favored Keep Hill. That June, she came third in the Mother Goose Stakes.

Banshee Breeze started picking up wins again with the Coaching Club American Oaks, beating Keeper Hill, the filly who bested her in the Kentucky Oaks, by a neck. She then won the Alabama Stakes, and the Spinster Stakes by twelve lengths while preparing for the Breeders' Cup Distaff. Before her final race of the season, Breeders' Cup Distaff, Jayeff B Stables purchased a half-interest in the filly. In the race, she lost by a nose to Escena. She was voted the American Champion Three-Year-Old Filly.

Banshee Breeze's four-year-old debut was the Rampart Handicap, which she won by 5 ½ lengths. Her next race was the Apple Blossom Handicap, in which she went off as the heavy favorite. She ended up winning the race. Banshee Breeze went on to win the Fleur de Lis Handicap in June, and the Go For Wand Handicap by half a length in August. She ran in the Personal Ensign Stakes later in August, but lost by 2 ¼ lengths to Beautiful Pleasure. She lost again in the Spinster Stakes, being beaten by 2 ½ lengths by Keeper Hill. Banshee Breeze ran in the last race of her career, the Breeder's Cup Distaff, that November. She lost by three quarters of a length to Beautiful Pleasure, and suffered a heat stroke after the race. Overall, Banshee Breeze raced 18 times, won 10, came second 5 times, and came third twice. Her total career earnings were $2,784,798.

== Death ==
Following her retirement, Banshee Breeze was sent to Claiborne Farm, and was bred to the leading sire Storm Cat. On April 8, 2001, near the end of her pregnancy, she was discovered to have a torsion of the uterus. It was surgically corrected that night, but she continued to show signs of discomfort the next morning. Banshee Breeze was found to have another torsion, this time in her small intestine. An operation to correct it required her foal, who was 19 days premature, to be removed via cesarean section. On noon of April 11, 2001, Banshee Breeze was euthanized at the Hagyard-Davidson-McGee equine veterinary clinic after her condition deteriorated. Her colt died that day as well. She is buried in the Marchmont Cemetery at Claiborne Farm.

== Pedigree ==
Pedigree of Banshee Breeze
Sire Unbridled	Fappiano	Mr. Prospector	Raise A Native
Sire Unbridled	Fappiano	Mr. Prospector	Gold Digger
Sire Unbridled	Fappiano	Killaloe	Dr. Fager
Sire Unbridled	Fappiano	Killaloe	Grand Splendor
Sire Unbridled	Gana Facil	Le Fabuleux	Wild Risk
Sire Unbridled	Gana Facil	Le Fabuleux	Anguar
Sire Unbridled	Gana Facil	Charedi	In Reality
Sire Unbridled	Gana Facil	Charedi	Magic
Dam Banshee Winds	Known Fact	In Reality	Intentionally
Dam Banshee Winds	Known Fact	In Reality	My Dear Girl
Dam Banshee Winds	Known Fact	Tamerett	Tim Tam
Dam Banshee Winds	Known Fact	Tamerett	Mixed Marriage
Dam Banshee Winds	Quack A Doodledoo	Quack	T.V. Lark
Dam Banshee Winds	Quack A Doodledoo	Quack	Quillon
Dam Banshee Winds	Quack A Doodledoo	Lost Virtue	Cloudy Dawn
Dam Banshee Winds	Quack A Doodledoo	Lost Virtue	Aunt Tilt
