= Carl Nafzger =

American Hall of Fame horse trainer (born 1941)

Personal information
- Born: August 29, 1941 (age 85) Plainview, Texas, U.S.
- Occupation: Horse trainer

Horse racing career
- Sport: Horse racing
- Career wins: 1,128+ (ongoing)

Major racing wins
- Breeders' Futurity (1980, 1986); Arlington Classic (1981); Arlington Oaks (1983, 1989, 1991, 1995); Washington Park Handicap (1985); Alcibiades Stakes (1986, 2002); Queen Elizabeth II Challenge Cup Stakes (1989); Florida Derby (1990); Lexington Stakes (1990, 2000); Secretariat Stakes (1990); Super Derby (1990); Memorial Day Handicap (1995); Alabama Stakes (1998, 2007); Bonnie Miss Stakes (1998); Coaching Club American Oaks (1998); Spinster Stakes (1998); Apple Blossom Handicap (1999); Go For Wand Handicap (1999); Travers Stakes (2000, 2007); Commonwealth Breeders' Cup Stakes (2001); Stonerside Beaumont Stakes (2003); Tampa Bay Derby (2007); Jim Dandy Stakes (2007) U.S. Triple Crown series: Kentucky Derby (1990, 2007); Breeders' Cup wins: Breeders' Cup Classic (1990); Breeders' Cup Juvenile (2006)

Racing awards
- Big Sport of Turfdom Award (1990, 2007); Eclipse Award for Outstanding Trainer (1990)

Honours
- Texas Horse Racing Hall of Fame (2007); Texas Rodeo Cowboy Hall of Fame (2008); United States Racing Hall of Fame (2008)

Significant horses
- Unbridled, Banshee Breeze, Street Sense, Fairway Phantom, Home At Last, Super Abound, Unshaded, Vicar, Star Choice, Mayo on the Side
- Updated on May 8, 2007

Carl A. Nafzger (born August 29, 1941) is an American Hall of Fame horse trainer. Before he was involved in horse racing, he was a champion rodeo bull rider.

Nafzger trained Unbridled, who won the 1990 Kentucky Derby and Breeders' Cup Classic. In 1990, he was voted the Eclipse Award for Outstanding Trainer and the Big Sport of Turfdom Award. In 1994 he wrote a book entitled Traits of a Winner, on the training of Thoroughbred horses, that was published by R. Meerdink Co. (ISBN 978-0929346328).

In 1998, Nafzger trained Banshee Breeze, who won that year's Eclipse Award for Outstanding 3-Year-Old Filly. In 2006, he was back in the national spotlight as the trainer of the colt Street Sense, who won the 2006 Breeders' Cup Juvenile and went on to win the 2007 Kentucky Derby. In the late 2000s and early 2010s, Nafzger moved into semi-retirement, training only for two clients: James B. Tafel, owner of Street Sense, and Bentley Smith. Smith's first wife (who died in 1999) was the daughter of Unbridled's owner, Frances A. Genter, and ran the Genter stable before its dissolution.

== Bull riding career ==
Nafzger competed in bull riding throughout the 1960s and qualified for the National Finals Rodeo three separate times. He retired from bull riding in 1972, after suffering a bad leg fracture.

== Horse training career ==
Following the end of his bull riding career, Nafzger went to California from his home in Texas and began training Thoroughbred racehorses. He had his first Kentucky Derby win in 1990, with Unbridled. His second Kentucky Derby winner was Street Sense in 2007.

== 1990 Kentucky Derby ==
At the 116th Kentucky Derby on May 5, 1990, Nafzger was in the Churchill Downs grandstand with Frances A. Genter, the 92-year-old owner of Unbridled, trained by Nafzger. Mrs. Genter's eyesight was failing and she could no longer see what was happening during a race. Nafzger gave Mrs. Genter an excited stretch call captured on television as Unbridled won, to her tearful delight. The staff of Blood-Horse Publications selected the scene for its book Horse Racing's Top 100 Moments.

== Awards and honors ==
- 2007 PBR Ring of Honor
- 2007 Texas Horse Racing Hall of Fame
- 2008 Texas Cowboy Hall of Fame
- 2008 National Museum of Racing and Hall of Fame
- 2008 Texas Rodeo Cowboy Hall of Fame
- 2020 Ben Johnson Memorial Award of the National Cowboy & Western Heritage Museum
