= 1990 Kentucky Derby =

Horse race

116th Kentucky Derby
- Kentucky Derby
- Grade I stakes race
- Location: Churchill Downs
- Date: May 5, 1990
- Winning horse: Unbridled
- Jockey: Craig Perret
- Trainer: Carl Nafzger
- Owner: Frances A. Genter Stable, Inc.
- Conditions: Good
- Surface: Dirt
- Attendance: 128,257

The 1990 Kentucky Derby was the 116th running of the Kentucky Derby. The race took place on May 5, 1990, with 128,257 people in attendance.

== Full results ==
Finished	Post	Horse	Jockey	Trainer	Owner	Time / behind
1st	7	Unbridled	Craig Perret	Carl Nafzger	Frances A. Genter Stable, Inc.	2:02
2nd	11	Summer Squall	Pat Day	Neil Howard	Dogwood Stable	
3rd	8	Pleasant Tap	Kent Desormeaux	Christopher Speckert	Buckland Farm	
4th	4	Video Ranger	Ron Hansen	Ian Jory	Myung Kwon Cho	
5th	9	Silver Ending	Chris McCarron	Ronald McAnally	A. Costanza & Deborah McAnally	
6th	3	Killer Diller	James Bruin	Frank A. Alexander	Barry K. Schwartz	
7th	2b	Land Rush	Ángel Cordero Jr.	D. Wayne Lukas	D.W. Lukas & Overbrook Farm	
8th	5	Mister Frisky	Gary Stevens	Laz Barrera	Solymar Stud	
9th	10	Thirty Six Red	Mike E. Smith	Nick Zito	B. Giles Brophy	
10th	2x	Power Lunch	Randy Romero	D. Wayne Lukas	Calumet Farm	
11th	2	Real Cash	Alex Solis	D. Wayne Lukas	D. Wayne Lukas & Overbrook Farm	
12th	12	Dr. Bobby A.	Nick Santagata	Stephen A. DiMauro	Sue Kat Stable	
13th	1	Pendleton Ridge	Laffit Pincay Jr.	Robert J. Frankel	Bruce McNall	
14th	1a	Burnt Hills	Patrick Valenzuela	Robert J. Frankel	Edmund A. Gann	
15th	6	Fighting Fantasy	Shane Sellers	John Churchman Jr.	Raymond Cottrell Sr.	

== Payout ==
Post	Horse	Win	Place	Show
7	Unbridled	US$23.60	7.80	5.80
11	Summer Squall		3.80	3.80
8	Pleasant Tap			12.00

- $2 Exacta: (7–11) Paid $65.80
