= Ashland Stakes =

American Thoroughbred horse race

- Class: Grade I
- Location: Keeneland Race Course; Lexington, Kentucky, United States
- Inaugurated: 1936
- Race type: Thoroughbred – Flat racing
- Website: ww2.keeneland.com/default.aspx

Race information
- Distance: 1 1/16 miles (8.5 furlongs)
- Surface: Dirt
- Track: left-handed
- Qualification: Three-year-old fillies
- Weight: Weight-For-Age
- Purse: $500,000

The Ashland Stakes is an American Thoroughbred horse race held annually in early April at Keeneland Race Course in Lexington, Kentucky, United States. It and the Ashland Oaks, the Kentucky Association racetrack's predecessor race, were named for Ashland, the homestead and breeding farm of statesman Henry Clay in Lexington, Kentucky. Restricted to three-year-olds fillies the race is currently run at a distance of one and one-sixteenth miles. The race is a Grade I event with a current purse of $500,000 and has been a prep race to the Triple Tiara of Thoroughbred Racing, including the Kentucky Oaks, the Black-Eyed Susan Stakes and Mother Goose Stakes.

Part of the 1936 inaugural events for the new Keeneland Race Course, the first two editions of the Ashland Stakes were open to fillies and mares, 3-years of age and older. Not run again until 1940, it was then made a race exclusively for 3-year-old fillies. During World War II, from 1943 through 1945 the race was hosted by Churchill Downs in Louisville.

The Ashland Stakes was run in two heats in 1952, 1965, 1974 and 1980. Don Brumfield is the only jockey to ever have won both heats. In the 1974 edition, Brumfield rode to victory on Winged Wishes, a horse owned by his mother, Viola, then took the second running aboard Darby Dan Farm's, Maud Muller.

Since its inception, the Ashland Stakes has been raced at various distances:

- 1936–1937, 1981 to present : 1 1/16 miles
- 1940–1973 : 6 furlongs
- 1974–1980 : 7 furlongs, 184 feet

In 2014, the Ashland finished in a Dead heat between Rosalind and Room Service.

== Records ==
Speed record at current distance

- 1:41.26 – 1 1/16 miles set by Speech in 2020.

Most wins by an owner

- 3 – Calumet Farm (1948, 1952, 1980)
- 3 – Cain Hoy Stable (1957, 1959, 1963)

Most wins by a jockey

- 3 – Bill Shoemaker (1964, 1981, 1982)
- 3 - Corey Lanerie (2009, 2016, 2017)
- 3 – Don Brumfield (1974 (2), 1984)
- 3 - Mike E. Smith (1994, 1997, 2013)
- 3 – Randy Romero (1980, 1985, 1990)
- 3 – Shane Sellers (1991, 1993, 2000)

Most wins by a trainer

- 4 – Woody Stephens (1949, 1957, 1959, 1963)

== Winners of the Ashland Stakes since 1969 ==
Year	Winner	Jockey	Trainer	Owner	Time
2026	Percy's Bar	Luan Machado	Ben Colebrook	Hat Creek Racing (Gatewood Bell, Managng Partner)	1:45.72
2025	La Cara	Dylan Davis	Mark E. Casse	Tracy Farmer	1:45.10
2024	Leslie's Rose	Irad Ortiz Jr.	Todd A. Pletcher	Whisper Hill Farm	1:43.85
2023	Defining Purpose	Brian Hernandez Jr.	Kenneth G. McPeek	Magdalena Racing, Colette Marie Vanmatre & James Ball	1:43.31
2022	Nest	Irad Ortiz, Jr.	Todd A. Pletcher	Repole Stable, Eclipse Thoroughbred Partners & Michael House	1:44.16
2021	Malathaat	Joel Rosario	Todd A. Pletcher	Shadwell Stable	1:42.94
2020	Speech	Javier Castellano	Michael W. McCarthy	Eclipse Thoroughbred Partners & Madaket Stables LLC	1:41.26
2019	Out For A Spin	Paco Lopez	Dallas Stewart	Commonwealth Stable	1:44.95
2018	Monomoy Girl	Florent Geroux	Brad H. Cox	Michael Dubb, Monomoy Stables, The Elkstone Group & Bethlehem Stables	1:43.74
2017	Sailor's Valentine	Corey Lanerie	Edward J. Kenneally	Semaphore Racing	1:45.54
2016	Weep No More	Corey Lanerie	Rusty Arnold	Ashbrook Farm	1:43.57
2015	Lovely Maria	Kerwin D. Clark	J. Larry Jones	Brereton C. Jones	1:43.66
2014	Rosalind (DH)	Joel Rosario	Kenneth G. McPeek	Landaluce Educe Stable	1:43.38
2014	Room Service (DH)	Shaun Bridgmohan	Wayne Catalano	Mary & Gary West	1:43.38
2013	Emollient	Mike E. Smith	William I. Mott	Juddmonte Farms	1:43.49
2012	Karlovy Vary	James Graham	Rusty Arnold	Alex G. Campbell Jr.	1:44.82
2011	Lilacs and Lace	Javier Castellano	John P. Terranova II	Covello, Hicks & Nikkel	1:42.73
2010	Evening Jewel	Kent Desormeaux	James M. Cassidy	Braly Family Trust	1:43.80
2009	Hooh Why	Corey Lanerie	Donna L. Dupuy	Derby Daze Farm & M. Hoffman	1:43.54
2008	Little Belle	Rajiv Maragh	Kiaran McLaughlin	Darley Stable	1:43.69
2007	Christmas Kid	René R. Douglas	James A. Jerkens	Edward P. Evans	1:42.90
2006	Bushfire	Cornelio Velásquez	Eddie Kenneally	Homewrecker Stable	1:45.16
2005	Sis City	Edgar S. Prado	Richard E. Dutrow Jr.	Stonerside Stable, Sanford Goldfarb, Joe Torre, Michael Dubb & Ira Davis	1:46.35
2004	Madcap Escapade	René R. Douglas	Frank L. Brothers	W. Bruce Lunsford	1:44.55
2003	Elloluv	Robby Albarado	Craig Dollase	Reddam Racing	1:43.58
2002	Take Charge Lady	Tony D'Amico	Kenneth G. McPeek	Select Stable	1:43.29
2001	Fleet Renee	John R. Velazquez	Michael W. Dickinson	V.H.W. Stable Inc	1:43.77
2000	Rings a Chime	Shane Sellers	Lonnie Arterburn	Turf Side Stables	1:44.40
1999	Silverbulletday	Jerry D. Bailey	Bob Baffert	Michael E. Pegram	1:41.60
1998	Well Chosen	Charles R. Woods Jr.	D. Wayne Lukas	Sue Magnier & Michael Tabor	1:43.00
1997	Glitter Woman	Mike E. Smith	Claude R. McGaughey III	H. Joseph Allen	1:43.80
1996	My Flag	Jerry D. Bailey	Claude R. McGaughey III	Ogden Phipps	1:42.60
1995	Urbane	Eddie Delahoussaye	Brian Mayberry	Samantha Siegel	1:43.40
1994	Inside Information	Mike E. Smith	Claude R. McGaughey III	Ogden Mills Phipps	1:46.80
1993	Lunar Spook	Shane Sellers	J. Bert Sonnier	Sandbar Farms	1:43.40
1992	Prospectors Delite	Craig Perret	Neil J. Howard	William S. Farish III	1:42.60
1991	Do It With Style	Shane Sellers	Gary C. Contessa	DJ Stable	1:43.60
1990	Go for Wand	Randy Romero	William Badgett Jr.	Christiana Stable	1:43.60
1989	Gorgeous	Eddie Delahoussaye	Neil Drysdale	Robert N. Clay	1:43.20
1988	Willa On the Move	Chris McCarron	Leon J. Blusiewicz	Lorraine Quinichett	1:45.80
1987	Chic Shirine	Sandy Hawley	D. Wayne Lukas	Emory Alexander	1:44.60
1986	Classy Cathy	Earlie Fires	Joseph M. Bollero	Edward A. Cox Jr.	1:44.00
1985	Koluctoo's Jill	Randy Romero	Bruce N. Levine	Brandy Hills Farm	1:44.40
1984	Enumerating	Don Brumfield	Dennis W. Ebert	Hardesty/Walden/Ebert	1:49.20
1983	Princess Rooney	Jacinto Vásquez	Frank Gomez	Paula J. Tucker	1:45.40
1982	Blush With Pride	Bill Shoemaker	D. Wayne Lukas	Stonereath Farm	1:45.00
1981	Truly Bound	Bill Shoemaker	Grover G. Delp	Windfields Farm	1:44.00
1980-1	Flos Florum	Randy Romero	William S. Borders	Strapro Stable	1:26.40
1980-2	Sugar and Spice	Jeffrey Fell	John M. Veitch	Calumet Farm	1:27.20
1979	Candy Eclair	Anthony Black	Mary Edens	Adele W. Paxson	1:27.00
1978	Mucchina	Jose Amy	Alan B. Marcus	Donald Newman	1:27.20
1977	Sound of Summer	Fernando Toro	Thomas A. Pratt	T. Busching/C. Bernstein	1:26.80
1976	Optimistic Gal	Braulio Baeza	LeRoy Jolley	Diana M. Firestone	1:26.80
1975	Sun and Snow	Garth Patterson	George T. Poole	Cornelius V. Whitney	1:26.60
1974-1	Winged Wishes	Don Brumfield	David Kassen	Viola Brumfield	1:28.80
1974-2	Maud Muller	Don Brumfield	Lou Rondinello	Darby Dan Farm	1:27.00
1973	Raging Whirl	Weston Soirez	Glenn Hild	Glenn Hild	1:10.80
1972	Barely Even	John L. Rotz	Lou M. Goldfine	Mrs. S. L. Gilmartin	1:11.00
1971	You All	Kenny Knapp	George T. Poole	Cornelius V. Whitney	1:11.00
1970	Gay Missile	Ray Broussard	Del W. Carroll	Michael Grace Phipps	1:10.00
1969	Double Delta	Carlos H. Marquez Sr.	Stanley M. Rieser	Drymon & Greenslit	1:10.00

*1972 – Hempens Song Disqualified from first and placed eighth.

== Earlier winners ==
- 1968 – Miss Swapsco
- 1967 – Dun-Cee
- 1966 – Justakiss
- 1965 – Terentia
- 1965 – Bright Bauble
- 1964 – Blue Norther
- 1963 – Sally Ship
- 1962 – Windy Miss
- 1961 – Goldflower
- 1960 – Tingle
- 1959 – Hidden Talent
- 1958 – Ramadel
- 1957 – Jota Jota
- 1956 – Doubledogdare
- 1955 – Insouciant
- 1954 – Jenjay
- 1953 – Cerise Reine
- 1952 – Free For Me
- 1952 – Real Delight
- 1951 – Sickle's Image
- 1950 – Wondring
- 1949 – Tall Weeds
- 1948 – Bewitch
- 1947 – Cosmic Missile
- 1946 – Sweet Caprice
- 1945 – Come And Go
- 1944 – Harriet Sue
- 1943 – Valdina Marl
- 1942 – The Swallow
- 1941 – Valdina Myth
- 1940 – June Bee
- 1939 – No race
- 1938 – No race
- 1937 – Drowsy
- 1936 – Myrtlewood

== See also ==
- Road to the Kentucky Oaks
