= Unbridled =

American-bred Thoroughbred racehorse

- Unbridled's grave at Claiborne Farm
- Sire: Fappiano
- Grandsire: Mr. Prospector
- Dam: Gana Facil
- Damsire: Le Fabuleux
- Sex: Stallion
- Foaled: March 5, 1987
- Died: October 18, 2001 (aged 14)
- Country: United States
- Color: Bay
- Breeder: Tartan Stable
- Owner: Frances A. Genter
- Trainer: Carl Nafzger
- Record: 24: 8-6-6
- Earnings: $4,489,475

Major wins
- What a Pleasure Stakes 1989; Florida Derby (1990); Deputy Minister Handicap (1991) Breeders' Cup wins: Breeders' Cup Classic (1990) U.S. Triple Crown wins: Kentucky Derby (1990)

Awards
- U.S. Champion 3-Yr-Old Colt (1990)

Honors
- Unbridled Stakes at Calder Race Course

Unbridled (March 5, 1987 – October 18, 2001) was a champion American Thoroughbred racehorse who won the 1990 Kentucky Derby and Breeders' Cup Classic.

He retired with a career record of eight wins, six places, and six shows in 24 starts, and $4,489,475 in career earnings. Unbridled had a rivalry with Summer Squall over their three and four-year-old seasons. Summer Squall defeated Unbridled in four of their six meetings.

== Background ==
Unbridled was a bay horse with a broad white blaze bred in Florida by Tartan Stable

He was sired by Fappiano (10 wins in 17 starts), by Mr. Prospector, and his dam was Gana Facil, by Le Fabuleux. Gana Facil was descended from Magic, a half-sister to both the champion sprinter Ta Wee and Dr Fager.

== Racing career ==
In 1987, Trainer Tony Barnard was given charge of and broke Unbridled, at Tartan Farms, in Ocala, Florida. In 1989, at age two, Unbridled won the What A Pleasure Stakes and placed in all six of his starts. At age three, ridden by jockey Pat Day, he won the Grade I Florida Derby by four lengths, then finished second behind Summer Squall in the Blue Grass Stakes. He then won America's most prestigious race, the Kentucky Derby, by 3½ lengths with jockey Craig Perret, while Summer Squall finishing second. He finished second in the Preakness Stakes to Summer Squall, and finished fourth without Lasix in the Belmont Stakes to the Irish colt Go And Go. In the fall, ridden by Day, Unbridled won the 1¼ mile Breeders' Cup Classic at Belmont Park in 2:02.20 minutes. His performances for the year earned him the prestigious Eclipse Award as champion three-year-old male of 1990.

When Unbridled won the Derby, a network television camera in the Churchill Downs stands captured his trainer, Carl Nafzger, giving the horse's elderly owner, Frances Genter, a stretch call because of her poor vision. Nafzger shouted, "He's going to win! He's going to win! Oh, Mrs. Genter, I love you!"

Racing as a four-year-old, Unbridled won the Deputy Minister Handicap at Gulfstream Park and placed second behind Summer Squall in the Fayette Handicap at Keeneland Race Course. Unbridled lost four of six meetings with rival Summer Squall.

== Stud record ==
Unbridled sired 292 runners that produced 183 winners (38 of those stakes winners) out of 437 foals, earning over $31 million by 2000. Ten of his offspring were Grade I stakes winners, four were classic winners, and three received Eclipse Awards. Unbridled is the last Kentucky Derby winner to sire another Derby winner: Grindstone, that won the Kentucky Derby in 1996.

Unbridled is also the last stallion to have sired at least one winner in each of the American Triple Crown races (first for each listed): Grindstone, Kentucky Derby, 1996; Red Bullet, Preakness Stakes, 2000; and Empire Maker, Belmont Stakes, 2003.

Some of Unbridled's other offspring include:

- Colts/Horses: Unbridled's Song, Eddington, Anees, Unshaded, Saarland, Mustanfar, Symphony Sid, Rebridled, Malabar Gold, Unbridled Jet, Unbridled's Image, Niigon, Greed is Good, Wheelaway, Unrestricted, Broken Vow, Pupil, and Uncoupled.
- Fillies/Mares: Banshee Breeze, Halfbridled, Exogenous, Santa Catarina, Surya, Lady Ballade, Happily Unbridled, Boom Town Girl, Unrestrained, Manistique, and Belterra.

Unbridled was grandsire through Unbridled's Song of the filly Eight Belles, who finished second at the 2008 Kentucky Derby but broke both front pasterns at the finish and was euthanized on the track, and of the colt Arrogate, who won the 2016 Breeders' Cup Classic and placed first in the World's Best Racehorse Rankings for that year. By his daughter Oatsee, he was also the broodmare sire of Shackleford, winner of the 2011 Preakness Stakes. Through his daughter Tap Your Heels, he was the broodmare sire of Tapit, leading sire in North America from 2014 to 2016 and sire of a record four Belmont Stakes winners.

One of Grindstone's foals, Birdstone, upset Smarty Jones to win the 2004 Belmont Stakes. Birdstone, in turn, sired Mine That Bird, a gelding that won the 2009 Kentucky Derby, and Summer Bird, a colt that won the 2009 Belmont Stakes. Empire Maker, which won the 2003 Belmont Stakes, sired Pioneerof the Nile, who placed behind his cousin Mine That Bird in the 2009 Kentucky Derby, and eventually sired American Pharoah, the first-ever winner of the Grand Slam of Thoroughbred racing in 2015. American Pharoah gave Unbridled the honour of four generations of Triple Crown race winners.

== Death ==
In September 2001, Unbridled underwent two operations at Hagyard Equine Medical Institute, near Lexington, Kentucky, to be treated for intestinal issues. He underwent his first surgery on September 21, where three feet of his intestine was removed. Five days removed from the first surgery, he suffered a setback, and underwent a second surgery on September 26. Unbridled recovered again and was sent home to Claiborne Farm on October 8. On October 19, 2001, at 6:00 PM, Unbridled was euthanized at the clinic after a severe bout of colic, with his condition being deemed inoperable.

Unbridled was laid to rest at Claiborne Farm.

== Pedigree ==
Pedigree of Unbridled (USA), bay stallion, 1987
Sire Fappiano (USA) 1977	Mr. Prospector (USA); 1970	Raise a Native	Native Dancer
Sire Fappiano (USA) 1977	Mr. Prospector (USA); 1970	Raise a Native	Raise You
Sire Fappiano (USA) 1977	Mr. Prospector (USA); 1970	Gold Digger	Nashua
Sire Fappiano (USA) 1977	Mr. Prospector (USA); 1970	Gold Digger	Sequence
Sire Fappiano (USA) 1977	Killaloe (USA); 1970	Dr Fager	Rough'n Tumble
Sire Fappiano (USA) 1977	Killaloe (USA); 1970	Dr Fager	Aspidistra
Sire Fappiano (USA) 1977	Killaloe (USA); 1970	Grand Splendor	Correlation
Sire Fappiano (USA) 1977	Killaloe (USA); 1970	Grand Splendor	Cequillo
Dam Gana Facil (USA) 1981	Le Fabuleux (FR); 1961	Wild Risk	Rialto
Dam Gana Facil (USA) 1981	Le Fabuleux (FR); 1961	Wild Risk	Wild Violet
Dam Gana Facil (USA) 1981	Le Fabuleux (FR); 1961	Anguar	Verso
Dam Gana Facil (USA) 1981	Le Fabuleux (FR); 1961	Anguar	La Rochelle
Dam Gana Facil (USA) 1981	Charedi (USA); 1976	In Reality	Intentionally
Dam Gana Facil (USA) 1981	Charedi (USA); 1976	In Reality	My Dear Girl
Dam Gana Facil (USA) 1981	Charedi (USA); 1976	Magic	Buckpasser
Dam Gana Facil (USA) 1981	Charedi (USA); 1976	Magic	Aspidistra (Family: 1-r)

== See also ==
- List of racehorses
