= 2013 Breeders' Cup Challenge series =

Series of horse races

The 2013 Breeders' Cup Challenge series provided winners of the designated races with an automatic "Win and You're In" Berth in the 2013 Breeders' Cup. Races were chosen by the Breeders' Cup organization and included key prep races in the various Breeders' Cup divisions from around the world.

For 2013, nine races were added to the series: the Triple Bend Handicap, Bing Crosby, Yorkshire Oaks, Lowther Stakes, Pat O’Brien, Juvenile Trial, Pocahontas, Iroquois and Canadian Stakes. A number of races that had previously been part of the series were dropped, including the Metropolitan Handicap, Hollywood Gold Cup, Delaware Handicap, Pretty Polly, Greenwood Cup, San Diego, Turf Monster, Hopeful, Del Mar Futurity, Gallant Bloom, Fillies Mile, Beresford, Middle Park (since its Breeders' Cup race, the Juvenile Sprint, had been eliminated), Canadian International and E.P. Taylor Stakes.

Thirty-six horses entered in the Breeders' Cup races qualified via the challenge series, including four of the winners. These were:

- Mucho Macho Man, who qualified for the Classic by winning the Awesome Again Stakes
- Beholder, who won the Zenyatta Stakes to qualify for the Distaff
- Dank, who earned her berth in the Filly & Mare Turf by winning the Beverly D. Stakes
- Wise Dan, who won the Woodbine Mile to qualify for the Mile

The winners of the 2013 Breeders' Cup Challenge series races are shown below. The last column shows whether the horse was subsequently entered in the Breeders' Cup, and if so, whether they achieved a top three finish.

Month	Race	Track	Location	Division	Winner	BC Result
January	Queen's Plate	Kenilworth	South Africa	Breeders' Cup Mile	Variety Club	not entered
April	Doncaster Mile	Randwick	Australia	Breeders' Cup Mile	Sacred Falls	not entered
April	TJ Smith Stakes	Randwick	Australia	Breeders' Cup Turf Sprint	Black Caviar	not entered
May	Gran Premio 25 de Mayo	San Isidro	Argentina	Breeders' Cup Turf	Ordak Dan	not entered
June	Triple Bend Handicap	Hollywood Park	California	Breeders' Cup Dirt Mile	Central Intelligence	entered
June	Stephen Foster Handicap	Churchill Downs	Kentucky	Breeders' Cup Classic	Fort Larned	entered
June	Shoemaker Mile	Santa Anita	California	Breeders' Cup Mile	Obviously	entered
June	Takarazuka Kinen	Hanshin	Japan	Breeders' Cup Turf	Gold Ship	not entered
July	Smile Sprint Handicap	Calder	Florida	Breeders' Cup Sprint	Bahamian Squall	entered
July	United Nations Stakes	Monmouth	New Jersey	Breeders' Cup Turf	Big Blue Kitten	entered
July	King George VI and Queen Elizabeth Stakes	Ascot	England	Breeders' Cup Turf	Novellist	not entered
July	Clement L. Hirsch Stakes	Del Mar	California	Breeders' Cup Distaff	Lady of Fifty	not entered
July	Just A Gleam Handicap	Hollywood Park	California	Breeders' Cup Filly & Mare Sprint	Book Review	entered
July	Bing Crosby Stakes	Del Mar	California	Breeders' Cup Turf Sprint	Offthebench	not entered
August	Whitney Handicap	Saratoga	New York	Breeders' Cup Classic	Cross Traffic	not entered
August	Beverly D. Stakes	Arlington	Illinois	Breeders' Cup Filly & Mare Turf	Dank	1st
August	Arlington Million	Arlington	Illinois	Breeders' Cup Turf	Real Solution	entered
August	Prix Jacques Le Marois	Deauville	France	Breeders' Cup Mile	Moonlight Cloud	not entered
August	Yorkshire Oaks	York	England	Breeders' Cup Filly & Mare Turf	The Fugue	entered BC Turf
August	Nunthorpe Stakes	York	England	Breeders' Cup Turf Sprint	Jwala	not entered
August	Lowther Stakes	York	England	Breeders' Cup Juvenile Fillies Turf	Lucky Kristale	not entered
August	Pacific Classic	Del Mar	California	Breeders' Cup Classic	Game On Dude	entered
August	Del Mar Handicap	Del Mar	California	Breeders' Cup Turf	Vagabond Shoes	entered
August	Pat O'Brien Handicap	Del Mar	California	Breeders' Cup Dirt Mile	Fed Biz	entered
August	Personal Ensign Stakes	Saratoga	New York	Breeders' Cup Distaff	Royal Delta	entered
August	Ballerina Stakes	Saratoga	New York	Breeders' Cup Filly & Mare Sprint	Dance to Bristol	entered
September	Grosser Preis von Baden	Baden-Baden	Germany	Breeders' Cup Turf	Novellist	not entered
September	Irish Champion Stakes	Leopardstown	Ireland	Breeders' Cup Turf	The Fugue	2nd
September	Juvenile Turf Stakes	Leopardstown	Ireland	Breeders' Cup Juvenile Turf	Australia	not entered
September	Moyglare Stud Stakes	Curragh	Ireland	Breeders' Cup Juvenile Fillies Turf	Rizeena	not entered
September	Pocahontas Stakes	Churchill Downs	Kentucky	Breeders' Cup Juvenile Fillies	Untapable	entered
September	Iroquois Stakes	Churchill Downs	Kentucky	Breeders' Cup Juvenile	Cleburne	entered
September	Canadian Stakes	Woodbine	Canada	Breeders' Cup Filly & Mare Turf	Minakshi	not entered
September	Woodbine Mile	Woodbine	Canada	Breeders' Cup Mile	Wise Dan	1st
September	Natalma Stakes	Woodbine	Canada	Breeders' Cup Juvenile Fillies Turf	Llanarmon	not entered
September	Summer Stakes	Woodbine	Canada	Breeders' Cup Juvenile Turf	My Conquestadory	entered Juv. Filly Turf
September	Royal Lodge Stakes	Newmarket	England	Breeders' Cup Juvenile Turf	Berkshire	not entered
September	Flower Bowl Invitational Stakes	Belmont Park	New York	Breeders' Cup Filly & Mare Turf	Laughing	entered
September	Joe Hirsch Turf Classic Invitational Stakes	Belmont Park	New York	Breeders' Cup Turf	Little Mike	entered
September	Kelso Handicap	Belmont Park	New York	Breeders' Cup Dirt Mile	Graydar	not entered
September	Vosburgh Stakes	Belmont Park	New York	Breeders' Cup Sprint	Private Zone	entered
September	Beldame Stakes	Belmont Park	New York	Breeders' Cup Distaff	Princess of Sylmar	entered
September	Jockey Club Gold Cup	Belmont Park	New York	Breeders' Cup Classic	Ron The Greek	entered
September	Awesome Again Stakes	Santa Anita	California	Breeders' Cup Classic	Mucho Macho Man	1st
September	FrontRunner Stakes	Santa Anita	California	Breeders' Cup Juvenile	Bond Holder	entered
September	Chandelier Stakes	Santa Anita	California	Breeders' Cup Juvenile Fillies	Secret Compass	entered
September	Rodeo Drive Stakes	Santa Anita	California	Breeders' Cup Filly & Mare Turf	Tiz Flirtatious	entered
September	Zenyatta Stakes	Santa Anita	California	Breeders' Cup Distaff	Beholder	1st
October	Prix de la Forêt	Longchamp	France	Breeders' Cup Mile	Moonlight Cloud	not entered
October	Prix de l'Opéra	Longchamp	France	Breeders' Cup Filly & Mare Turf	Dalkala	not entered
October	Prix Jean-Luc Lagardère	Longchamp	France	Breeders' Cup Juvenile Turf	Karakontie	not entered
October	Pilgrim Stakes	Belmont	New York	Breeders' Cup Juvenile Turf	Bobby's Kitten	3rd
October	Miss Grillo Stakes	Belmont	New York	Breeders' Cup Juvenile Fillies Turf	Testa Rossi	2nd
October	Nearctic Stakes	Woodbine	Canada	Breeders' Cup Turf Sprint	Phil's Dream	not entered
October	Alcibiades Stakes	Keeneland	Kentucky	Breeders' Cup Juvenile Fillies	My Conquestadory	entered Juv. Fillies Turf
October	Phoenix Stakes	Keeneland	Kentucky	Breeders' Cup Sprint	Sum of The Parts	entered
October	Champagne Stakes	Belmont Park	New York	Breeders' Cup Juvenile	Havana	2nd
October	Frizette Stakes	Belmont Park	New York	Breeders' Cup Juvenile Fillies	Artemis Agrotera	entered
October	Shadwell Turf Mile Stakes	Keeneland	Kentucky	Breeders' Cup Mile	Silver Max	entered
October	Breeders' Futurity Stakes	Keeneland	Kentucky	Breeders' Cup Juvenile	We Miss Artie	entered
October	Thoroughbred Club of America Stakes	Keeneland	Kentucky	Breeders' Cup Filly & Mare Sprint	Judy the Beauty	2nd
October	Santa Anita Sprint Championship	Santa Anita	California	Breeders' Cup Sprint	Offthebench	not entered
October	Bourbon Stakes	Keeneland	Kentucky	Breeders' Cup Juvenile Turf	Poker Player	entered
October	Spinster Stakes	Keeneland	Kentucky	Breeders' Cup Distaff	Emollient	not entered
October	Jessamine Stakes	Keeneland	Kentucky	Breeders' Cup Juvenile Fillies Turf	Kitten Kaboodle	entered
