= 2011 Belmont Stakes =

American horse race

143rd Belmont Stakes
- Belmont Stakes
- "The Test of the Champion"
- Location: Belmont Park; Elmont, New York, U.S.
- Date: June 11, 2011
- Distance: 1 1/2 mi (12 furlongs; 2,414 m)
- Winning horse: Ruler on Ice
- Winning time: 2:30.88
- Final odds: 24.75 (to 1)
- Jockey: Jose Valdivia, Jr.
- Trainer: Kelly J. Breen
- Owner: George and Lori Hall
- Conditions: Sloppy
- Surface: Dirt

The 2011 Belmont Stakes was the 143rd running of the Belmont Stakes and was won by Ruler on Ice. The race was run on June 11, 2011, and was televised in the United States on the NBC television network. The post time was 6:30 p.m. EDT (10:30 p.m. UTC). As in the previous year, the Belmont (the final jewel in the Triple Crown) was run without the elusive championship at stake as 2011 Kentucky Derby winner Animal Kingdom lost in the Preakness.

Favorite Animal Kingdom lost his footing at the start and could only muster sixth; Ruler On Ice, with jockey Jose Valdivia Jr., sprinted to the finish ahead of Stay Thirsty.

== Race ==
Derby winner Animal Kingdom and Preakness winner Shackleford both competed in the race, which was the first clash at the Belmont between winners of the first two classics since Afleet Alex scored over Giacomo in 2005.

Animal Kingdom attempted to become the 12th horse to complete a Derby-Belmont double, last accomplished by Thunder Gulch in 1995. Animal Kingdom suffered from a bad start and clipped heels with another horse (not identified by his jockey) and was the last horse for the first quarter of the race, but was able to recover and finished in 6th place. Shackleford finished in 5th place after leading for most of the race before the final stretch.

Other starters were Kentucky Derby second-place finisher Nehro and Mucho Macho Man, 3rd in the Derby and 6th in the Preakness. Other Derby contenders Master of Hounds (5th) and Santiva (6th) also ran.

== Field ==
Kentucky Derby winner Animal Kingdom was installed as the 2–1 early line favorite. For the first time, the first seven finishers from the Derby ran in the Belmont.

Finish	Post	Horse name	Trainer	Jockey	Opening odds (to 1)	Final odds	Stakes
1	3	Ruler on Ice	Kelly J. Breen	Jose Valdivia, Jr.	20–1	24	$600,000
2	2	Stay Thirsty	Todd Pletcher	Javier Castellano	20–1	15	$200,000
3	5	Brilliant Speed	Thomas Albertrani	Joel Rosario	15–1	10	$110,000
4	6	Nehro	Steve Asmussen	Corey Nakatani	4–1	9–2	$60,000
5	12	Shackleford	Dale Romans	Jesus Castanon	9–2	10	$30,000
6	9	Animal Kingdom	H. Graham Motion	John R. Velazquez	2–1	5–2	
7	10	Mucho Macho Man	Katherine Ritvo	Ramon Dominguez	10–1	7	
8	4	Santiva	Eddie Kenneally	Shaun Bridgmohan	15–1	13	
9	7	Monzon	Ignacio Correas IV	Jose Lezcano	30–1	26	
10	1	Master of Hounds	Aidan O'Brien	Garrett K. Gomez	10–1	5	
11	8	Prime Cut	Neil J. Howard	Edgar Prado	15–1	20	
12	11	Isn't He Perfect	Doodnauth Shivmangal	Rajiv Maragh	30–1	28	

- Margins – 3/4 length, 1 1/2 lengths
- Time – 2:30:88
- Track – Sloppy (sealed)

== Payout ==
The Belmont Stakes Payout Schedule

Program Number	Horse Name	Win	Place	Show
3	Ruler on Ice	$51.50	$26.00	$13.60
2	Stay Thirsty	-	$19.40	$10.80
5	Brilliant Speed	-	-	$7.90

- $2 Exacta: 3-2 paid $928.00
- $2 Trifecta: 3-2-5 paid $8,268.00
- $2 Superfecta: 3-2-5-6 paid $74,052.00

== See also ==
- 2011 Kentucky Derby
- 2011 Preakness Stakes
