= 2011 Preakness Stakes =

136th running of the Preakness Stakes

136th Preakness Stakes
- The Preakness Stakes
- "The Middle Jewel of the Triple Crown" "The Run for the Black-Eyed Susans"
- Location: Pimlico Race Course, Baltimore, Maryland, United States
- Date: May 21, 2011
- Winning horse: Shackleford
- Winning time: 1:56.47
- Final odds: 12.6-1
- Jockey: Jesús Castañón
- Trainer: Dale Romans
- Conditions: Fast
- Surface: Dirt
- Attendance: ▲118,356

The 2011 Preakness Stakes was the 136th running of the Preakness Stakes and was won by Shackleford. The race took place on May 21, 2011, and was televised in the United States on the NBC television network. The post time was 6:18 p.m. EDT (10:18 p.m. UTC). The race was the 12th race on a card of 13 races. The Maryland Jockey Club reported total attendance of 118,356, this is recorded as second highest on the list of American thoroughbred racing top attended events for North America in 2011.

== Payout ==
The 136th Preakness Stakes Payout Schedule

Program Number	Horse Name	Win	Place	Show
5	Shackleford	US$27.20	$10.20	$6.80
11	Animal Kingdom	–	$4.20	$3.60
1	Astrology	-	-	$8.00

- $2 Exacta: (5-11) paid $114.10
- $1 Trifecta: (5-11-1) paid $700.90
- $1 Superfecta: (5-11-1-10) paid $3,106.30

== The full chart ==
A full field of 14 was drawn for the race. Kentucky Derby winner Animal Kingdom was installed as the 2-1 early line favorite. Also close Derby finishers Mucho Macho Man and Shackleford entered the race while Nehro, the 2nd-place finisher opted not to contest in this race.

Finish Position	Margin (lengths)	Post Position	Horse name	Jockey	Trainer	Owner	Morning Line Odds	Post Time Odds	Purse Earnings
1st	0	5	Shackleford	Jesus Castanon	Dale Romans	Michael Lauffer & William D. Cubbedge	12–1	12.60–1	$1,150,000
2nd	1/2	11	Animal Kingdom	John Velazquez	H. Graham Motion	Team Valor	2–1 favorite	2.30–1 favorite	$200,000
3rd	1 3/4	1	Astrology	Mike E. Smith	Steve Asmussen	Stonestreet Stables	15–1	15.50–1	$110,000
4th	4 1/4	10	Dialed In	Julien Leparoux	Nicholas P. Zito	Robert V. LaPenta	9–2	4.40–1	$60,000
5th	6 1/4	8	Dance City	Ramon Domínguez	Todd Pletcher	Edward P. Evans	12–1	11.50–1	$30,000
6th	7 1/2	9	Mucho Macho Man	Rajiv Maragh	Kathy Ritvo	Reeves Thoroughbred Racing	6–1	5.20–1	
7th	9	3	King Congie	Robby Albarado	Thomas Albertrani	West Point Thoroughbreds	20–1	21.90–1	
8th	9 3/4	14	Mr. Commons	Victor Espinoza	John Shirreffs	St. George Farm	20–1	32.90–1	
9th	11 1/4	12	Isn't He Perfect	Edgar Prado	Doodnauth Shivmangal	Kharag Stables	30–1	30.90–1	
10th	12 1/2	13	Concealed Identity	Sheldon Russell	Edmond Gaudet	Linda Gaudet & Morris Bailey	30–1	25.70–1	
11th	13 3/4	2	Norman Asbjornson	Julian Pimental	Chris Grove	Thomas McClay & Harry Nye	30–1	42.70–1	
12th	15	6	Sway Away	Garrett Gomez	Jeffrey L. Bonde	Batman Stable	15–1	12.30–1	
13th	22 1/4	7	Midnight Interlude	Martin Garcia	Bob Baffert	Arnold Zetcher	15–1	13.60–1	
14th	22 1/2	4	Flashpoint	Cornelio Velásquez	Wesley Ward	Peachtree Stable	20–1	16.50–1	

- Winning Breeder: Michael Lauffer and W.D. Cubbedge; (KY)
- Final Time – 1:56.47
- Track Condition – Fast
- Total Attendance: 118,356

=== Running ===
Shackleford held off a late charge by Animal Kingdom. Shackleford battled Flashpoint for the lead through a quick opening quarter-mile of 22.69 seconds, just a fifth of a second off the Preakness record.

=== Bonus Stakes ===
- A $550,000 bonus was awarded to Shackleford's connections for his victory in the Preakness because of his participation in the Fountain of Youth Stakes and a top-three finish in the Florida Derby. His owners were awarded $500,000 while his trainer Dale Romans earned $50,000 in bonus money.

== Notable achievements ==
- First victory in a Triple Crown race for jockey Jesus Castanon and trainer Dale Romans

== See also ==
- 2011 Kentucky Derby
- 2011 Belmont Stakes
