= Barry Irwin =

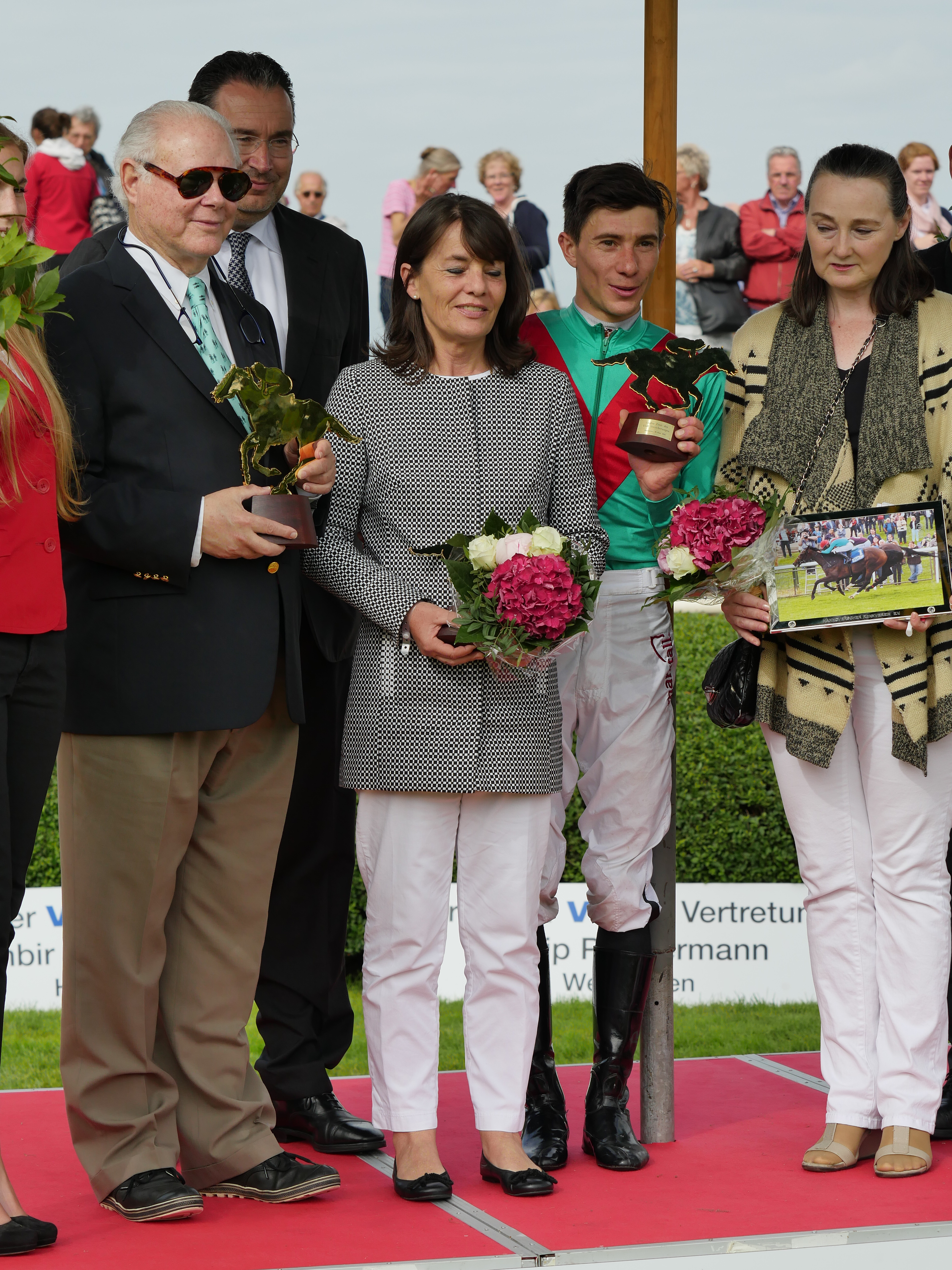
Barry Irwin (left) at the Neue Bult race track in Hanover, Germany

Barry Howard Irwin (born April 21, 1943, in Long Beach, California) is the owner of the Thoroughbred horse racing stable of Team Valor International in Lake Worth, Florida. He is the owner and breeder of the 2011 Kentucky Derby and 2013 Dubai World Cup winner, Animal Kingdom.

== Career ==
Barry Irwin become interested in horse racing at an early age when an aunt and uncle introduced him to the sport.

In 1969, Irwin became a staff writer for The Blood-Horse magazine in Kentucky.

From 1970 through 1974 Irwin served as editor, staff writer and advertising manager for The Thoroughbred of California.

From 1975 through 1978 Irwin was a syndicated columnist for Southern California in Daily Racing Form.

From 1976 through 1978, Irwin hosted a twice-weekly, two-hour radio program, as well as a weekly, one-hour television program.

Irwin left DRF at the end of the 1978 Del Mar meet to establish the bloodstock agency Pacifica Thoroughbreds. For the next decade, Irwin bred, raced, syndicated, bought, and sold several hundred horses, including It's the One, African Sky, Moscow Ballet and Torsion.

In 1987, Irwin founded Clover Racing Stable, which became Team Valor in 1992 when a partner in Clover Racing opted out. In 2007 Irwin bought out long-time partner and friend Jeff Siegel and became the sole proprietor of the stable. At that time, because of the changing focus toward foreign racing and foreign thoroughbred acquisitions, Irwin changed the name of the stable to Team Valor International.

In 1987 the first horse Irwin syndicated, named Political Ambition, won the Grade 1 Hollywood Derby and at year's end was the top-weighted 3-year-old on grass on The Blood-Horse year-end handicap.

In 1989, Irwin's colt Prized won the Grade 1, $2-million Breeders' Cup Turf in his first race on grass, and at year's end was the top-weighted 3-year-old on grass on The Blood-Horse year-end handicap.

In 1989, Irwin's Martial Law scored a 50-to-1 upset victory in the historic Grade 1 Santa Anita Handicap.

In 1993, Irwin's Star of Cozzene won the Grade 1 Arlington Million the year Team Valor won 21 individual stakes.

In 2003, Irwin's mare Ipi Tombe was named Horse of the Year in the United Arab Emirates after winner the Grade 1 $2-million Dubai Duty Free.

In 2004, 2005 and 2006, Irwin purchased yearling horses at public auction which later went on to win Grade 1 races.

In 2005, Irwin's mare Sweet Stream won the Group 1 Prix Vermeille in France and was accorded honors as the Champion Older Mare in England after winner the Group 2 Park Hill Stakes.

In 2006, Irwin's Irridescence, which had been named Champion Filly at 3 in South Africa the year before when she was a double Grade 1 winner, upset two-time Breeders' Cup heroine Ouija Board (horse) in the Grade 1 $1.8-million Audemars Piguet Queen Elizabeth II Cup in Hong Kong.

In 2007, Irwin's $25,000 South African yearling buy Captain's Lover won the Classic, Grade 1 Cape Fillies Guineas and was voted Champion Filly at 3 in The Republic.

In 2010, Irwin's Ebony Flyer joined her half-sister Captain's Lover as a winner of the Classic, Grade 1 Cape Fillies Guineas.

In 2010, Irwin's horse Pluck, which he bred from a South African mare he had earlier imported, won the Breeders' Cup Juvenile Turf.

In 2011, Irwin's horse, Animal Kingdom, which he bred from a German mare he had earlier imported, won the 137th Kentucky Derby. The Derby winner's sire, the Brazilian-bred horse Leroidesanimaux, had earlier been purchased for stud duty by Barry Irwin on behalf of a Kentucky breeding farm. Animal Kingdom was voted an Eclipse Award, emblematic of being the Champion Colt at 3 in North America.

In 2013, Animal Kingdom won the world's richest horserace - the $10-million Dubai World Cup in the United Arab Emirates.

In 2019 Irwin's filly Axana earned honors as the Champion 3-year-old (regardless of sex) in Germany.

In 2019 Irwin's colt Technician was honored in France as the Champion Stayer at 3, and also Champion Stayer regardless of age in the same season.

== Racing around the globe ==
Irwin's stable, Team Valor International, is a global venture. Since 1987, one in every 4 horses raced by the stable has won a stakes race. A total of 163 stakes winners have been campaigned by Irwin's stable, of which 100 have won Graded races. Irwin has developed 77 horses to have won or placed in a Grade 1 race, 30 of which have won a total of 40 Grade 1 races.

A total of 16 individual horses have won a combined total of 21 Championships throughout the world, including in the United States, England, Ireland, France, Germany, Italy, Brazil and South Africa.

Irwin's stable has campaigned winners in the following locales: United States, Canada, England, Ireland, France, Germany, Italy, Austria, Switzerland, Dubai, Saudi Arabia, South Africa, Hong Kong, Japan, Brazil, Uruguay, and South Korea.

== Authoring ==
In the year 2000, Eclipse Press, the publishing arm of the industry magazine The Blood-Horse began a series of books about the greatest horses in the history of American racing. This was called the Thoroughbred Legends Series. In 2002, Barry Irwin was invited to write the Legends Series book "Swaps; the California Comet" which told the story of the 1955 Kentucky Derby winner. Irwin eagerly accepted the task since Swaps was his favorite racehorse of all time.

In 2016, Barry Irwin published his memoirs titled "Derby Innovator; the Making of Animal Kingdom", in which he reviews the moments in his life which helped to form his unique perspective on horse racing, including management and breeding. He also shares some excellent insight and background on many of the famous racehorses who carried his colors to the winners' circle - from his first stakes win in the 1970s in California, all the way to the 2011 Kentucky Derby with Animal Kingdom.

In 2026, Irwin published his first novel, a work of fiction titled "A Knight Errant", a tale of a young turf writer who happens upon a horse born to be a truly great runner. In a press release, the author stated that he had three major goals in writing the story; a) to show why fans of horse racing are so passionate about the sport, b) what it is like to campaign a top-level equine athlete, and c) what the difference is between equine medications and performance-enhancing drugs.

Irwin has also been a long-time contributor of Op-Ed pieces for the Paulick Report, The Blood-Horse, Sporting Post and the Thoroughbred Daily News on industry matters.

== Awards and scholarships ==
Irwin was a founding director with the equine-related charity "Race for Education," which raises money to provide college scholarships to the offspring of backstretch and farm workers. One percent of the purse money earned by Team Valor horses (with a matching amount from Irwin) went to the Race for Education to provide these much-needed scholarships. In 2006, Irwin became the organization's inaugural recipient of the "Valedictorian Award." His participation with this charity spanned from its founding through 2009. Irwin also served a term as the Chairman of the Board for the organization.

Barry Irwin, through his desire to improve the industry and the lives of those who work in it, has established the following annual awards and scholarships:

Stanley Bergstein Writing Award

- Irwin established the Stanley Bergstein Writing Award to motivate writers to produce articles and Op/Ed pieces in the tradition of the honoree, hard-hitting turf writer Stanley Bergstein who died in 2011. Irwin puts up the annual winning prize of $25,000 in the hopes that it will encourage turf writers to get out of their usual comfort zone and engage in real investigative journalism. The award was first given in 2012.

The Isaac Murphy Memorial Scholarship

- In 2012, Barry Irwin established the Isaac Murphy Memorial Scholarship, named in honor of the racing industry's greatest jockey Isaac Murphy whose lifetime winning percentage of 44% has never been approached. The scholarship assists in funding the entire college education of the successful African-American applicant who has the passion to work in the equine industry upon graduation. The Race for Education oversees the application process of this award.

The Johnny Velazquez Scholarship

- Also initiated in 2012, this college scholarship honors Hall of Fame jockey Johnny Velazquez who rode Team Valor International's horse Animal Kingdom to victory in the 2011 Kentucky Derby. The scholarship is awarded to a student of Hispanic descent who has a passion to work in the equine industry upon graduation. The Race for Education oversees the application process for this award.

== Anti-doping stance ==
Barry Irwin is a staunch proponent of clean sport and has been in the forefront of industry initiatives to create and monitor races on a level playing field. Irwin has written numerous Op-Eds in several industry publications over the last four decades on the subject of drugs in racing.

Irwin, in a 2004 Op-Ed for The Blood-Horse first floated the idea of having USADA handle drugs and medication use in American racing.

Irwin was invited by David E. Newton to contribute a section on drugs in racing, which he entitled Cheating with Drugs in Thoroughbred Racing which appeared in the book Steroids and Doping in Sports, published in 2018. Irwin devoted the last chapter of his memoir Derby Innovator to summarizing current issues regarding the overuse of performance-enhancing drugs (PEDs) and ended with an optimistic look at the future of racing once federal legislation had been adopted.

In 2012, Irwin gave testimony in the United States Senate in the Committee on Commerce Science and Transportation, which focused on medication use in horse racing. Senator Tom Udall of New Mexico chaired the hearing and invited Irwin to speak. Irwin worked with Senator Udall in an effort to develop and enact Federal legislation to reign in the rampant misuse in American Racing of drugs, both legal and illegal.

Irwin has been a longtime member of the Water Hay Oats Alliance and has been a driving force in the 7-year-long initiative that led to the successful passage by both Houses of the United States Congress of the Horseracing Integrity and Safety Act, which as its centerpiece named the United States Anti-Doping Agency to oversee drugs in North American racing. As part of the WHOA Legislative support effort, Irwin joined with U.S. Representatives Paul Tonko (D-New York) and Andy Barr (R-Kentucky) to fight for the legislation that was successfully enacted late in 2020.

In 2014, the equine charity Equine Advocates named Barry Irwin as that year's recipient of their "Equine Savior Award" citing his industry leadership and staunch stance on banning drugs in the sport of horse racing.

== Personal life ==
Barry Irwin lives in Lake Worth with his wife Kathleen. He also has a daughter, Chloë. Irwin is an avid collector of art, being particularly interested in works of Racing and Sporting Art, such as those by Lee Townsend and Vaughn Flannery.

== See also ==
- Horse racing
