= Bill Cubbedge =

American horse trainer

William D. "Bill" Cubbedge (born September 5, 1951, in Bainbridge, Ohio) is an American race horse owner and breeder.

== Biography ==
Bill Cubbedge, along with partner Michael Lauffer, owned the Thoroughbred racehorse Shackleford. Trained by Dale Romans, their horse ran fourth in the 2011 Kentucky Derby then came back to win the second leg of the U.S. Triple Crown series, the Preakness Stakes. Shackleford went on to win the Grade 1 Metropolitan Handicap in 2012.
