= Mucho Macho Man =

American-bred Thoroughbred racehorse

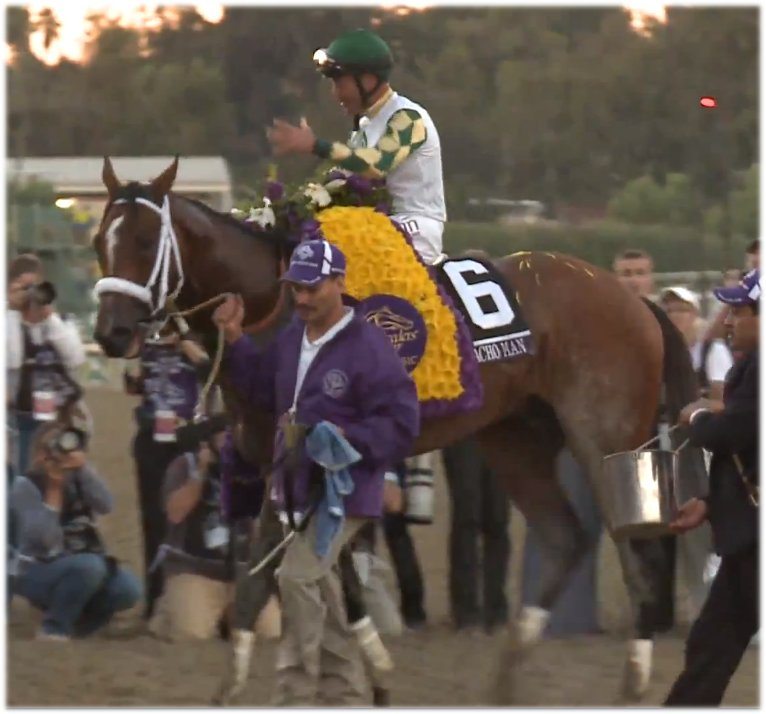
- Mucho Macho Man after winning the 2013 Breeders' Cup Classic
- Sire: Macho Uno
- Grandsire: Holy Bull
- Dam: Ponche De Leona
- Damsire: Ponche
- Sex: Stallion
- Foaled: June 15, 2008
- Country: United States
- Color: Bay
- Breeder: John D. Rio & Carole A. Rio
- Owner: Reeves Thoroughbred Racing
- Trainer: Katherine Ritvo
- Record: 25: 9–5–6
- Earnings: US$ 5,625,410

Major wins
- Risen Star Stakes (2011); Sunshine Millions Classic (2012, 2014); Gulfstream Park Handicap (2012); Suburban Handicap (2012); Awesome Again Stakes (2013); Breeders' Cup wins: Breeders' Cup Classic (2013)

Awards
- Secretariat Vox Populi Award 2013; NTRA Moment of the Year; Florida-bred Horse of the Year 2013

Mucho Macho Man (foaled June 15, 2008) is an American Thoroughbred racehorse who won the 2013 Breeders' Cup Classic. He was foaled in Florida and named after the Village People song "Macho Man". His breeders were Carole and John Rio of Florida, who owned his dam. His foalhood nickname was "Lazarus" because he appeared lifeless at birth, but spontaneously revived. He grew to be a very large horse, standing over 17 hands (68 inches, 173 cm) high. Throughout most of his racing career, Mucho Macho Man was primarily owned by Dean and Patti Reeves of Reeves Thoroughbred Racing of Suwanee, Georgia. They purchased a majority interest in him after his first race in 2010, and in 2012 became his sole owners. In February 2014, Frank Stronach purchased an undisclosed share in the horse on behalf of his Adena Springs Farms, owner of Mucho Macho Man's sire, Macho Uno.

When Dean and Patti Reeves purchased the horse, they placed him with horse trainer Tim Ritvo, who shortly thereafter began a job with Gulfstream Park. Training duties were turned over to Tim's wife and fellow trainer Kathy Ritvo, who trained Mucho Macho Man from his fourth race on. His racing career was supported by a close-knit team, led by Ritvo and the Reeves as well as Reeves' racing manager Finn Green. Mucho Macho Man was ridden in races by several top jockeys, including Rajiv Maragh, Ramon Dominguez, Mike Smith, Edgar Prado and Gary Stevens.

Because Mucho Macho Man was born late in the year for a Thoroughbred foal, as a growing two- and three-year-old he had to compete against horses that were several months older and more mature. He was also very tall, and as a young racehorse sometimes got in his own way; as a three-year-old, he stepped on his front feet with his hind feet and tore off a horseshoe in two different races. In 2011, he competed in all three Triple Crown races, coming in third in the Kentucky Derby. Following a five-month layoff due to surgery that addressed a problem with his breathing, he returned to the track in November 2011 with a win, won three graded stakes races in 2012, and finished a close second to Fort Larned in that year's Breeders' Cup Classic.

In 2013, after overcoming a respiratory virus early in the year, he ran two races on the east coast, finishing third both times, and then was shipped early to Santa Anita Park to prepare for that year's Breeders' Cup. He won a preparatory race, the Awesome Again Stakes, his seventh win overall and his first Grade I win. This qualified him for the 2013 Breeders' Cup Classic, which he won, narrowly defeating Will Take Charge and Declaration of War. His success earned him the Secretariat Vox Populi Award and the National Thoroughbred Racing Association Moment of the Year as well as two Eclipse Award nominations and 2013 Florida-bred Horse of the Year. Sportswriter Steve Haskin, who followed the horse's career for The Blood-Horse, stated that the saga "provided enough uplifting human interest stories to fill a book". Mucho Macho Man returned to the track in January 2014 with a decisive win in the Sunshine Millions Classic, but finished fourth in the Santa Anita Handicap. He remained in training, still essentially sound, but following the discovery of bruising on his fetlocks and other signs of "wear and tear", he was retired in July 2014.

The stallion began to stand at stud in the 2015 breeding season at Adena Springs. His offspring began racing in 2018, and in 2020 his 4-year-old son Mucho Gusto won the Pegasus World Cup. As of 2026 he stands at Adena Springs North in Aurora, Ontario.

== Background ==
Mucho Macho Man is a bay horse with white markings that include a star and stripe on his face, a sock on his left hind leg, and a coronet on his front right leg. He stands over 17 hands (68 inches, 173 cm) high. He was sired by Macho Uno, who won the Breeders' Cup Juvenile and was named American Champion Two-Year-Old Colt in 2000. Macho Uno was a son of Hall of Fame champion Holy Bull. Mucho Macho Man's dam is the 2001 Anoakia Stakes winner Ponche de Leona. Both sire and dam were owned by Frank Stronach's Adena Springs Farms at the time of mating; the pregnant mare was subsequently purchased by John and Carole Rio of Florida, where Mucho Macho Man was foaled, and thus the Rios are officially listed as his breeders. Mucho Macho Man was Ponche de Leona's second foal and was born extremely late in the foaling season on June 15, 2008; this meant that as a two- and three-year-old, not yet fully grown, he had to compete on equal terms with horses who were as much as five months older than he. (Note: For official racing purposes, all Thoroughbreds are considered a year older on January 1 in North America, regardless of actual foaling date.)

Ponche de Leona delivered Mucho Macho Man three weeks after her due date. At birth, the foal was lifeless with no heartbeat. Farm staff tried to revive him by massaging and shaking him. He was unresponsive for several minutes, then his eyes opened and he "just got up and galloped away". As a result, his foalhood nickname was "Lazarus". In addition to being a late foal, he was very big and hence slow to reach full development. Because the young horse was so tall and skinny, John Rio called him "Mr. Green Jeans", though no one else did. His official name is derived from the Village People song "Macho Man", and owner Dean Reeves' nickname for him is "Macho".

The Rios sold the horse as a two-year-old to Jim Culver of Dream Team One Racing Stable, keeping an ownership share for themselves. After Mucho Macho Man's first race in 2010, a majority share in the colt was purchased by Dean and Patti Reeves, owners of Reeves Thoroughbred Racing of Suwanee, Georgia, near Atlanta. When the Reeves purchased their controlling interest, he was sent into training with Tim Ritvo, but when Ritvo was appointed director of racing at Gulfstream Park in Florida, the conditioning of the colt was turned over to his wife and fellow trainer, Kathy. Jonathan "Finn" Green joined the Reeves' program as racing manager in September 2011.

Mucho Macho Man overcame several health issues in 2011 and 2013. He had surgery to address a breathing problem in 2011, and suffered from a respiratory virus and hoof problems, including a quarter crack, in 2013.

Not only did the horse survive near-death in 2008, so did Kathy Ritvo, who had a heart transplant in November 2008. She was diagnosed with cardiomyopathy in 2001, limiting her horse training career. By 2008 her condition deteriorated to the point where she was hospitalized for several months, and she was near death when an organ became available. Less than six months after transplant surgery, she returned to training race horses. In a 2011 interview, she compared her own rapid recovery to the spontaneous recovery of the horse as a foal, and stated, "from the moment I opened my eyes [following surgery], I felt fantastic. He's Mucho Macho Man and I'm Macho Woman."

"The best way to explain him is like it's driving a car, you can drive a nice car slow, but you know you've got a ton of gas underneath you."

— Nick Petro, Jr.

In 2012, Reeves Thoroughbred Racing bought out Dream Team One's 30-percent interest and became the sole owners of Mucho Macho Man. Later, Mike and Laura Sivo obtained a minority share. Also in 2012, the team added a permanent exercise rider to their roster: Ritvo's nephew, former jockey Nick Petro Jr. Petro actually rode Mucho Macho Man more than anyone else. A strong support staff also worked consistently with the horse, including assistant trainer Marcelino Valencia, stable groom Valietal Tapia, and hot walker Karina Lopez. The horse's connections remained unchanged through 2013. In February 2014, anticipating the stallion's future retirement to a stud career after the 2014 season, Adena Springs Farms purchased an interest in Mucho Macho Man, but he remained in training with the same team and raced under Reeves' colors. Frank Stronach, noting that Adena arranged the mating between Macho Uno and Ponche de Leona, described the sale as "a homecoming of sorts".

Mucho Macho Man was given his basic start under saddle by Carole and John Rio. Still tall and lanky, he was sent to Bill White for race training, with Carole telling the trainer, "physically this horse is late, but mentally he's way ahead." Throughout his racing career, Mucho Macho Man has been described as a generally calm horse with a good temperament, a "happy" horse who "likes his job", "businesslike" and easy to rate. However, he disliked being whipped, and was notorious for his dislike of wet conditions, performing poorly when asked to run in the mud; his worst races were on sloppy tracks. Though viewed as "laid back", he was generally very fast out of the starting gate, which caused him problems twice in his three-year-old season when he tore off a front horseshoe by stepping on his own front heels with his hind feet. Ritvo said "I think he's so excited to get out of the gate that he's springing before his front feet are gone." His quickness out of the gate, described by one of his jockeys as akin to that of a Quarter Horse, became an asset once he matured. Steve Haskin noted that the horse was undefeated whenever he had the lead by the eighth pole but had never won when he did not.

== Racing career ==
=== 2010: two-year-old season ===
Mucho Macho Man first raced at Calder Race Course. He was scratched by the track veterinarian from the first race into which he was entered; he had been slightly injured when the horse next to him reared and flipped over in the starting gate. He was entered in another race a week later, a maiden race in which he finished second, losing to a colt named Gourmet Dinner. After that race, Mucho Macho Man was purchased by Reeves Thoroughbred Racing. Dean and Patti Reeves had considered purchasing Gourmet Dinner, but Dean Reeves recalled saying at the time, "Call me crazy, but I like the second horse." After the sale, Tim Ritvo took over the training of Mucho Macho Man from his original trainer, Bill White. The colt came in third at his next race, at Saratoga in New York state; he won his first race on September 19, 2010, at Monmouth Park in New Jersey. After that race, the colt's training was turned over to Kathy Ritvo when Tim began working for Gulfstream Park. In November 2010, Mucho Macho Man moved up to graded class and finished second behind To Honor and Serve twice in a row at Aqueduct Racetrack in New York City, first in the Nashua Stakes and then in the Remsen Stakes. Throughout his two-year-old year the young horse was easily distracted, so he raced with blinkers for both White and Ritvo.

=== 2011: three-year-old season ===
Mucho Macho Man began his second year of racing by finishing fourth behind winner Dialed In in the Grade III Holy Bull Stakes at Gulfstream Park, and once again finished behind Gourmet Dinner, who was third. Mucho Macho Man was then sent to New Orleans for the Risen Star Stakes at the Fair Grounds Race Course. Ridden by Rajiv Maragh, he recorded his first graded stakes win, prevailing by one and a half lengths over Santiva. Ritvo took away the blinkers for a workout prior to the race and kept them off, stating that the colt had matured and was more at ease without them. At the Risen Star, he first came to the notice of one of his future jockeys, Gary Stevens, then a sports analyst, who noted the colt's calm demeanor, describing him as "a chilled out customer... very relaxed". The next race was the Louisiana Derby, a major preparatory race for the Kentucky Derby. In that race, he lost his right front horseshoe at the start when he "grabbed a quarter"—tearing off the shoe and a bit of his hoof when he stepped on the heel of his front foot with one of his back feet. He finished third behind Pants on Fire and Nehro.

Before he was a full 36 calendar months old, Mucho Macho Man contested all three legs of the American Triple Crown. He finished third to Animal Kingdom and Nehro in the Kentucky Derby. He was described as having a "babyish look" prior to the Derby, and Ritvo said that he was still growing, but Stevens noted during the Derby's television broadcast, "when he fills into this frame, he's going to be a big, powerful horse." Mucho Macho Man was sixth behind Shackleford in the Preakness. At the start, he again tore off a shoe, this time from his left front hoof, even though Ritvo had switched him to glued-on horseshoes. The misstep may have accounted for his low placing. Before the Belmont, Ritvo brought in a farrier specialist, who gave the horse custom made glued-on horseshoes made of a wire-framed synthetic composite and who also squared off the toes of Mucho Macho Man's hind shoes to make it harder for him to accidentally step on his front heels. At the Belmont, Ramon Dominguez took over from Maragh as the colt's jockey, and went on to ride him for a total of five races. That day, the track was sloppy and the horse ran seventh behind winner Ruler on Ice. After the Belmont, he did not race for several months because he needed surgery to fix a problem with his breathing.

In September, Finn Green, a recovering alcoholic with his own story of triumph over adversity, began working for Reeves. A knowledgeable horseman, Green insisted that as a condition of employment he had the right to advocate for what was best for a horse under his management, even if that meant expressing disagreement and imposing "tough love" on the owners. He and Ritvo saw eye to eye on Mucho Macho Man, and they began planning the colt's return to the track. After a break of almost five months, Mucho Macho Man raced in November and won an allowance race at Aqueduct, beginning a three-race winning streak. He had lost his "babyish" look, put on weight, and as Ritvo put it, "His shoulders [caught] up with his behind." Ritvo and Green then mapped out a 2012 workout and racing schedule for Mucho Macho Man, intending to run him every six to ten weeks with recovery time after each race.

=== 2012: four-year-old season ===
For his four-year-old debut, Mucho Macho Man ran at Gulfstream Park, defeating Ron the Greek in the Sunshine Millions Classic, a race restricted to horses bred in Florida or California. He had finally grown into his tall frame. Dominguez returned as his jockey and was pleased with what he saw, saying, "You can really tell how much he's grown up since I rode him in the Belmont. Back then, he was just a big skinny horse that had a lot of maturing to do. Now he looks like he's grown up and has everything figured out." Dominguez further described him as "forward" out of the gate and said the race was an "easy" win. He raced again in March, winning the Grade II Gulfstream Park Handicap by two lengths. In May at Churchill Downs, he finished third behind Successful Dan and Fort Larned in the Grade II Alysheba Stakes, carrying top weight of 123 pounds (56 kg) . His next race was the Grade II Suburban Handicap at Belmont Park on July 7. Ridden for the first time by Mike Smith, who was his jockey for the remainder of the year, he took the lead in the straight and won by 2.5 lengths. It was considered his most significant win of the year. In the Woodward Stakes at Saratoga on September 1, he finished second by a neck, having been pushed toward the outside of the track by the winner, To Honor and Serve, in the final furlong. On November 3, Mucho Macho Man was one of twelve horses to contest the Breeders' Cup Classic at Santa Anita in California. Starting at odds of 6–1, he was always in the first two and finished second, half a length behind Fort Larned. There was a 6 1/2-length gap back to the other runners, who included Flat Out, Game On Dude, To Honor and Serve, and Ron The Greek. He ended the year seventh in the nation for total race earnings, and tied for thirteenth in the World Thoroughbred Rankings.

=== 2013: five-year-old season ===
Mucho Macho Man began his 2013 season by running again in the Sunshine Millions Classic, but the track was sloppy, and on this occasion he was pulled up in the homestretch and placed last in the race. As the horse was not visibly lame, jockey Smith told Ritvo, "It's gotta be something inside." Though speculation was that he simply did not like the wet track, shortly thereafter he was diagnosed with a respiratory virus. He also developed a quarter crack in his hoof and spent the rest of the spring recuperating at Fair Hill Training Center in Maryland.

"He works hard every race ... He's just a blue collar horse who shows up every time."

— Dean Reeves

In June, he returned to the track. Ridden by Edgar Prado, he started as the odds-on favorite for the Criminal Type Stakes at Belmont Park but finished third of the five runners. On August 3, he finished third to Cross Traffic and Successful Dan in the Whitney Handicap at Saratoga, with Ron The Greek fourth and Fort Larned fifth. It was at this time that his proclivity to win only when in front at the eighth pole was first commented upon in the racing press. He was once again entered in the Woodward Stakes at Saratoga on August 31, but Ritvo scratched him on the day of the race due to the wet track, described as a "sea of slop".

Ritvo then moved Mucho Macho Man to Santa Anita Park almost two months before the Breeders' Cup races because she felt he "thrived" in California. It was a major commitment for the horse's team, as Ritvo, Green, Petro, Tapia and Lopez had to leave their home base in Florida, and Reeves had to cover the expenses. Dean Reeves said, "Everybody has basically put their lives and their family second to the benefit and the best we can do for Macho." The horse's next race was the Awesome Again Stakes at Santa Anita on September 28. Because both Smith and Prado had prior riding commitments, Ritvo and Green decided to contact Gary Stevens. Stevens' contribution to the human interest saga included a comeback in 2013 after having been forced to retire seven years earlier due to debilitating knee pain. He also had his own near-death experience, having survived a major riding accident in 2003. In a twist of serendipity, Stevens' agent, Craig O'Brien, came by the barn to inquire about the horse's availability about the same time Ritvo and Green had decided to see if Stevens was available. Stevens later claimed to be unaware of his agent's machinations. Noting that Stevens had portrayed Seabiscuit's jockey George Woolf in the eponymous film, Ritvo later joked, "I was in Hollywood. How could I not use a film star?" In the course of the Awesome Again, Mucho Macho Man settled behind the leaders before making a bid on the final turn. The horse led by three lengths in the homestretch, and accelerated clear of the field to win easily by 4 1/2 lengths over Paynter. It was his first win in 2013 and his first Grade I stakes win. The victory was also a "win and you're in" qualifying race for the Breeders' Cup Classic, which included a waiver of the $100,000 entry fee for the Classic.

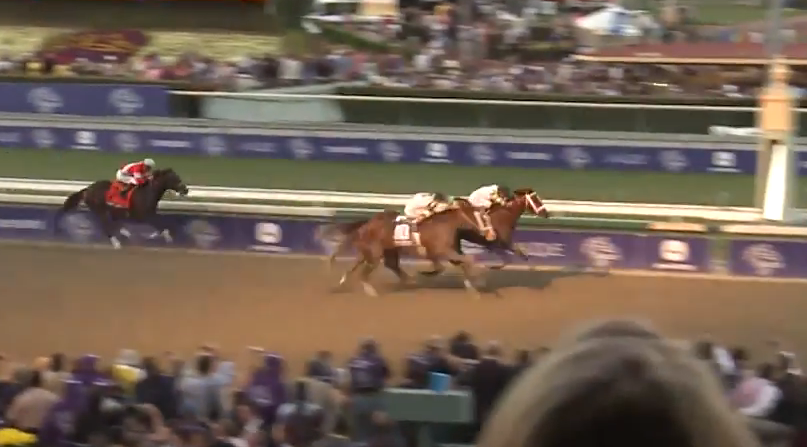
Mucho Macho Man (right, leading) winning the 2013 Breeders' Cup Classic

On November 2, Mucho Macho Man contested his second Breeders' Cup Classic and was the second favorite at 4–1 in a strong field that included Game On Dude (the favorite), Paynter, Palace Malice, Fort Larned, Will Take Charge and Flat Out, as well as the European challenger Declaration of War. The horse broke quickly from the gate and took the lead, but Stevens decided to settle him just behind the leaders before going to the outside and moving to the front on the final turn. In the closing stages, he held off two strong late challenges to win by a slim nose over second-place finisher Will Take Charge and by a head over third-place finisher, the European contender Declaration of War. After Mucho Macho Man's victory, the 50-year-old Stevens, winning the Classic for the first time after 14 previous attempts, said, "this was a tremendous experience to win this race... It's the icing on the cake of my career." Ritvo was credited with a "super" job of training the horse. In a moment of synchronicity, actress Elizabeth Banks, who co-starred with Stevens in Seabiscuit, playing Marcella Howard, presented the Breeders' Cup Classic trophy.

In December, Mucho Macho Man was awarded the 2013 Secretariat Vox Populi Award, recognizing the struggles the horse had overcome in reaching success, also noting the accomplishments of his connections, including trainer Ritvo's success overcoming her own health issues to train him and Stevens' comeback from retirement. Dean and Patti Reeves stated, "It is a great honor to think that a horse with such humble beginnings could intertwine the lives and stories of so many people, and tug at the heartstrings of racing fans from all over the world." At the end of 2013, Mucho Macho Man was the number one-ranked horse for the year in North American purse winnings, higher than rivals Will Take Charge and Game On Dude as well as the other two top five contenders Orb and Wise Dan. He was also nominated for two Eclipse Awards, Horse of the Year and Older Male Horse, but finished second in both categories to Wise Dan.

"The horse had his rebirth and my mom had hers, and look what they've done with it."

— Michael Ritvo, son of Tim and Kathy Ritvo, after the 2013 Breeders' Cup Classic

He was named Florida-bred Horse of the Year for 2013, noting that he was only the third Florida-bred horse to win the Classic, after Unbridled and Skip Away. In the 2013 World's Best Racehorse Rankings, Mucho Macho Man was given a rating of 125, the best horse in the world running solely on dirt, a five-way tie as the seventh-best racehorse in the world, and tied with Animal Kingdom as the second-best racehorse in North America, behind Wise Dan. His win in the Classic was also selected as the National Thoroughbred Racing Association's "Moment of the Year". Participation in the online polling for that award, up by more than 50 percent from the previous year, was believed to be largely due to the popularity of Mucho Macho Man and the people around him.

=== 2014: six-year-old season ===
In December 2013, Ritvo and Green confirmed that Mucho Macho Man would return to race as a six-year-old, and their goal for the horse was to "target the Breeders' Cup again". Though presumed full-grown, he still had continued to fill out from the previous year. Ritvo announced that the horse would begin his racing season for a third time with the Sunshine Millions Classic, if the track was dry. On January 18, 2014, Ritvo and the horse got a clear day and a fast track. Mucho Macho Man won the six-horse race by 14 lengths. The field included his former nemesis, Gourmet Dinner, who finished fifth. Stevens returned as his jockey and stated, "I geared him down at the end to try not to overdo it."

His connections next entered him in the Santa Anita Handicap, nicknamed the "Big 'Cap", on March 8, returning to California rather than shipping him overseas to run in the $10 million Dubai World Cup later that month, again stating that they considered it to be best for the horse. With the announcement that Will Take Charge was also coming to California, the 2014 race became the most highly anticipated running since the matchup of Alysheba and Ferdinand in 1988, the only other time that the previous year's Breeders' Cup top two finishers returned to challenge one another at the Santa Anita Handicap. Additional interest came from the return of Game On Dude, who won the Big 'Cap in 2011 and 2013. Mucho Macho Man was assigned the highest impost at 124 pounds (56.2 kg). Will Take Charge was assigned 123 pounds (55.8 kg) and Game on Dude, 122 pounds (55.3 kg). Eight horses entered, with Mucho Macho Man the morning line favorite. Game On Dude, described as "on fire" that day, won the race and broke the stakes record in doing so, Will Take Charge was second, but Mucho Macho Man started to lose energy at the three-eighths pole and finished fourth behind Blingo. Ritvo had no excuses for his finish, noting only that he had missed a few training days due to rain, and the extra moisture had also changed the condition of the Santa Anita track. On May 1, 2014, Georgia Governor Nathan Deal proclaimed Mucho Macho Man Day in the state of Georgia, recognizing the accomplishments of the horse and the attention he and his owners brought to Georgia.

He returned to Florida for training after the Big 'Cap, but after performing poorly in a June workout was found to have some bruising of his fetlocks, and was given lighter duty. On July 15 it was announced that Mucho Macho Man was officially retired from racing and would stand at stud at Adena Springs beginning in the 2015 breeding year. In a further twist of synchronicity, in the same week Stevens announced he was taking a break from race riding due to the need for a total knee replacement. Ritvo explained that Mucho Macho Man was sound, but "[a]fter five seasons of training and racing, he shows signs of some minor wear and tear. He is still sound and happy, but we have decided that it is in his best interests to retire him. He has nothing more to prove to any of us."

== Racing statistics ==
Conversions of distance and abbreviations for the owners are given after the table.

| Date | Age | Distance * | Race | Grade | Track | Odds | Time | Field | Finish | Margin | Jockey | Trainer | Owner ** | Ref |
|---|---|---|---|---|---|---|---|---|---|---|---|---|---|---|
| Jul 17, 2010 | 2 | 6 furlongs | Maiden Special Weight | Maiden | Calder Race Course | 5.80 | 1:11.99 | 12 | 2 | 1 length | Luis Arango | William White | DT1 | |
| Aug 21, 2010 | 2 | 7 furlongs | Maiden Special Weight | Maiden | Saratoga | 1.90 | N/A | 9 | 3 | N/A | Garrett Gomez | Timothy Ritvo | RTR & DT1 | |
| Sep 19, 2010 | 2 | 8.318 furlongs | Maiden Special Weight | Maiden | Monmouth Park | 1.10 | 1:42.84 | 11 | 1 | 4 lengths | Eibar Coa | Timothy Ritvo | RTR & DT1 | |
| Nov 6, 2010 | 2 | 8 furlongs | Nashua Stakes | II | Aqueduct Racecourse | 6.50 | 1:35.86 | 5 | 2 | 4 lengths | David Cohen | Katherine Ritvo | RTR & DT1 | |
| Nov 27, 2010 | 2 | 9 furlongs | Remsen Stakes | II | Aqueduct Racecourse | 15.40 | 1:50.03 | 5 | 2 | 2 lengths | Eibar Coa | Katherine Ritvo | RTR & DT1 | |
| Jan 30, 2011 | 3 | 8 furlongs | Holy Bull Stakes | III | Gulfstream Park | 2.40 | N/A | 9 | 4 | N/A | Eibar Coa | Katherine Ritvo | RTR & DT1 | |
| Feb 19, 2011 | 3 | 8.5 furlongs | Risen Star Stakes | II | Fair Grounds | 3.60 | 1:43.98 | 10 | 1 | 1 1/2 lengths | Rajiv Maragh | Katherine Ritvo | RTR & DT1 | |
| Mar 26, 2011 | 3 | 9 furlongs | Louisiana Derby | II | Fair Grounds | 1.50 | N/A | 12 | 3 | N/A | Rajiv Maragh | Katherine Ritvo | RTR & DT1 | |
| May 7, 2011 | 3 | 10 furlongs | Kentucky Derby | I | Churchill Downs | 9.30 | N/A | 19 | 3 | N/A | Rajiv Maragh | Katherine Ritvo | RTR & DT1 | |
| May 21, 2011 | 3 | 9.5 furlongs | Preakness Stakes | I | Pimlico Race Course | 5.20 | N/A | 14 | 6 | N/A | Rajiv Maragh | Katherine Ritvo | RTR & DT1 | |
| Jun 11, 2011 | 3 | 12 furlongs | Belmont Stakes | I | Belmont Park | 8.20 | N/A | 12 | 7 | N/A | Ramon Dominguez | Katherine Ritvo | RTR & DT1 | |
| Nov 9, 2011 | 3 | 8 furlongs | Allowance Optional Claiming | Allowance | Aqueduct Racecourse | 1.45 | 1:34.72 | 6 | 1 | 5 3/4 lengths | Ramon Dominguez | Katherine Ritvo | RTR & DT1 | |
| Jan 28, 2012 | 4 | 9 furlongs | Sunshine Millions Classic | Listed stakes | Gulfstream Park | 2.10 | 1:47.91 | 7 | 1 | 1 1/2 lengths | Ramon Dominguez | Katherine Ritvo | RTR & DT1 | |
| Mar 10, 2012 | 4 | 8 furlongs | Gulfstream Park Handicap | II | Gulfstream Park | 0.70 | 1:35.50 | 5 | 1 | 2 lengths | Ramon Dominguez | Katherine Ritvo | RTR & DT1 | |
| May 4, 2012 | 4 | 8 furlongs | Alysheba Stakes | II | Churchill Downs | 1.70 | N/A | 8 | 3 | N/A | Ramon Dominguez | Katherine Ritvo | RTR & DT1 | |
| Jul 7, 2012 | 4 | 9 furlongs | Suburban Handicap | II | Belmont Park | 5.80 | 1:46:58 | 7 | 1 | 2 1/2 lengths | Mike E. Smith | Katherine Ritvo | RTR | |
| Sep 1, 2012 | 4 | 9 furlongs | Woodward Stakes | II | Saratoga | 0.80 | 1:48:56 | 7 | 2 | neck | Mike E. Smith | Katherine Ritvo | RTR | |
| Nov 3, 2012 | 4 | 10 furlongs | Breeders' Cup Classic | I | Santa Anita Park | 0.80 | 2:00.11 | 12 | 2 | 1/2 length | Mike E. Smith | Katherine Ritvo | RTR | |
| Jan 19, 2013 | 5 | 9 furlongs | Sunshine Millions Classic | Listed stakes | Gulfstream Park | 0.40 | N/A | 7 | DNF | N/A | Mike E. Smith | Katherine Ritvo | RTR | |
| Jun 14, 2013 | 5 | 8.5 furlongs | Criminal Type Stakes | Listed stakes | Belmont Park | 0.75 | N/A | 5 | 3 | N/A | Edgar Prado | Katherine Ritvo | RTR | |
| Aug 3, 2013 | 5 | 9 furlongs | Whitney Handicap | I | Saratoga | 8.50 | N/A | 8 | 3 | N/A | Edgar Prado | Katherine Ritvo | RTR | |
| Sep 28, 2013 | 5 | 9 furlongs | Awesome Again Stakes | I | Santa Anita Park | 1.60 | 1:48.30 | 10 | 1 | 4 1/4 lengths | Gary Stevens | Katherine Ritvo | RTR | |
| Nov 2, 2013 | 5 | 10 furlongs | Breeders' Cup Classic | I | Santa Anita Park | 4.00 | 2:00.72 | 11 | 1 | nose | Gary Stevens | Katherine Ritvo | RTR | |
| Jan 18, 2014 | 6 | 9 furlongs | Sunshine Millions Classic | Listed stakes | Gulfstream Park | 0.10 | 1:48.76 | 6 | 1 | 14 lengths | Gary Stevens | Katherine Ritvo | RTR | |
| Mar 8, 2014 | 6 | 10 furlongs | Santa Anita Handicap | I | Santa Anita Park | 1.20 | N/A | 8 | 4 | N/A | Gary Stevens | Katherine Ritvo | RTR & SS | |

** Owners
| Abbreviation | Owner |
|---|---|
| DT1 | Dream Team One Racing Stable |
| RTR | Reeves Thoroughbred Racing |
| SS | Stronach Stables |

* Conversion of distances in furlongs
| furlongs | miles | meters |
|---|---|---|
| 6 furlongs | 3/4 mile | 1,200 meters |
| 7 furlongs | 7/8 mile | 1,400 meters |
| 8 furlongs | 1 mile | 1,600 meters |
| 8.318 furlongs | 1 mile 70 yards | 1,673 meters |
| 8.5 furlongs | 1 1/16 miles | 1,600 meters |
| 9 furlongs | 1 1/8 miles | 1,800 meters |
| 10 furlongs | 1 1/4 miles | 2,000 meters |
| 12 furlongs | 1 1/2 miles | 2,400 meters |

== Retirement ==
Mucho Macho Man was retired to Adena Springs in Kentucky with a stud fee for 2015 of $15,000. His first starter, Mucho Amor, became his first winner on April 26, 2018. Mucho Macho Man finished the year in the top 10 of the North American first crop sire rankings, with 11 winners including Mucho Gusto. In 2020, Mucho Gusto became his first Grade I winner by taking the Pegasus World Cup. He stood at Hill ‘n’ Dale Farms in Paris, Kentucky from 2021 to 2023, before being relocated to Adena Springs North in Aurora, Ontario for the 2024 season, where he currently still stands as the only Breeders Cup Classic winner at stud in Canada.

== Pedigree ==
Mucho Macho Man is sired by Macho Uno, who stands at stud at Adena Springs Farms in Kentucky. As of January 2019, Macho Uno had sired 38 stakes winners. Besides Mucho Macho Man, they include: Potesta, winner of the Hollywood Oaks; Macho Again; and Wicked Style. Macho Uno is a son of Holy Bull, who was the 1994 American Horse of the Year, and Breeders' Cup Classic winner Awesome Again is a half-brother to Macho Uno; both horses were out of the mare Primal Force. The sire line of Mucho Macho Man traces back to the 1898 Kentucky Derby winner, Plaudit. Because Macho Uno carries no lines to stallions Northern Dancer, Seattle Slew, Hail to Reason, or In Reality, who commonly appear in Thoroughbred pedigrees, he is valued as a near-total outcross for most Thoroughbred mares in North America.

Mucho Macho Man's dam is stakes-winning Ponche de Leona, whose pedigree is not particularly well known. Her sire, Ponche, won five stakes races and sired five stakes winners. Her dam won one race in 19 starts. Mucho Macho Man thus has very little linebreeding; only a 4×4 cross to the sire Mr. Prospector, meaning that this horse appears twice in the fourth generation of his pedigree. Ponche de Leona was purchased at the Keeneland sale in November 2007 by John and Carole Rio for $33,000 when in foal with Mucho Macho Man, the relatively low price partly owing to having been bred late in the year; late foals are difficult to sell. However, by November 2011, after the success of Mucho Macho Man in his three-year-old year, and in foal to Macho Uno again, the Rios resold her at Keeneland for $300,000. Following Mucho Macho Man's Breeders' Cup win in 2013, and having also produced the stakes-placed Mucho Man's Gold, she was again sold at the Keeneland January 2014 sale, this time in foal to Distorted Humor, bringing $775,000. In 2013, she was named Florida broodmare of the year by the Florida Thoroughbred Breeders' and Owners' Association.

Pedigree of Mucho Macho Man, bay stallion, foaled 2008
| Sire Macho Uno (US) 1998 | Holy Bull (US); 1991 | Great Above | Minnesota Mac |
| Sire Macho Uno (US) 1998 | Holy Bull (US); 1991 | Great Above | Ta Wee |
| Sire Macho Uno (US) 1998 | Holy Bull (US); 1991 | Sharon Brown | Al Hattab |
| Sire Macho Uno (US) 1998 | Holy Bull (US); 1991 | Sharon Brown | Agathea's Dawn |
| Sire Macho Uno (US) 1998 | Primal Force (US); 1987 | Blushing Groom | Red God |
| Sire Macho Uno (US) 1998 | Primal Force (US); 1987 | Blushing Groom | Runaway Bride |
| Sire Macho Uno (US) 1998 | Primal Force (US); 1987 | Prime Prospect | Mr Prospector* |
| Sire Macho Uno (US) 1998 | Primal Force (US); 1987 | Prime Prospect | Square Generation |
| Dam Ponche de Leona (US) 1999 | Ponche (CAN); 1989 | Two Punch | Mr Prospector* |
| Dam Ponche de Leona (US) 1999 | Ponche (CAN); 1989 | Two Punch | Heavenly Cause |
| Dam Ponche de Leona (US) 1999 | Ponche (CAN); 1989 | Street Ballet | Nijinsky |
| Dam Ponche de Leona (US) 1999 | Ponche (CAN); 1989 | Street Ballet | Street Dancer |
| Dam Ponche de Leona (US) 1999 | Perfect and Proud (US); 1986 | Nonparrell | Hoist The Flag |
| Dam Ponche de Leona (US) 1999 | Perfect and Proud (US); 1986 | Nonparrell | Floral Victory |
| Dam Ponche de Leona (US) 1999 | Perfect and Proud (US); 1986 | Proud Sal | Proudest Roman |
| Dam Ponche de Leona (US) 1999 | Perfect and Proud (US); 1986 | Proud Sal | Gal Sal (Family 4-r) |

* Mucho Macho Man is inbred 4S x 4D to the stallion Mr Prospector, meaning that he appears fourth generation on the sire side of his pedigree, and fourth generation on the dam side of his pedigree.

== Sources ==
- HRTV Presents: Mucho Macho Man. HRTV. 2013-12-29.
