= Shackleford (horse) =

American-bred Thoroughbred racehorse

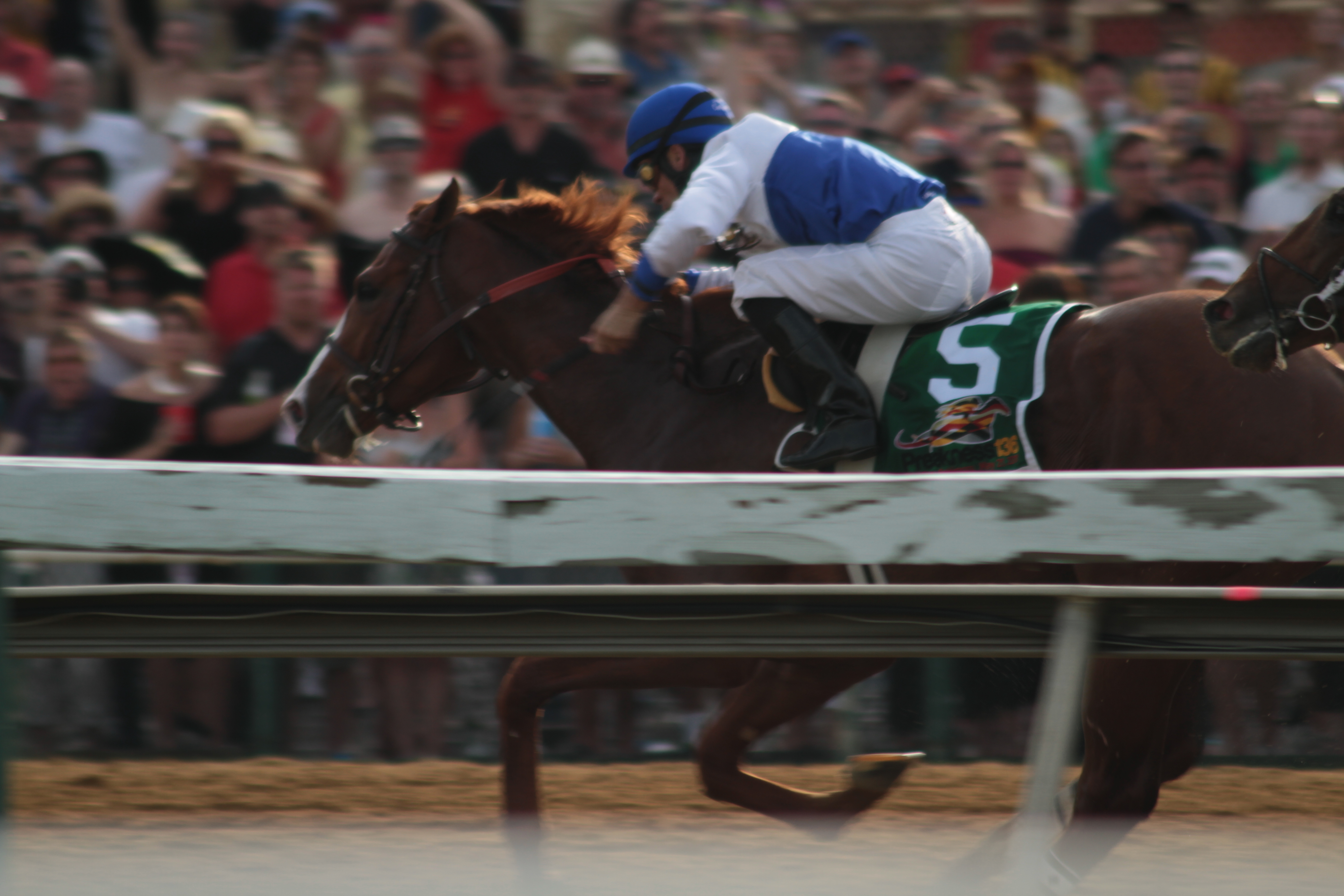
- Shackleford in the 2011 Preakness Stakes.
- Sire: Forestry
- Grandsire: Storm Cat
- Dam: Oatsee
- Damsire: Unbridled
- Sex: Stallion
- Foaled: 2008
- Country: United States
- Colour: Chestnut
- Breeder: Michael Lauffer & William D. Cubbedge
- Owner: Michael Lauffer & William D. Cubbedge
- Trainer: Dale Romans
- Record: 20: 6-5-1
- Earnings: $3,090,101.

Major wins
- Churchill Downs Stakes (2012); Metropolitan Handicap (2012); Clark Handicap (2012); Triple Crown classic race wins: Preakness Stakes (2011)

Shackleford (foaled February 25, 2008) is a chestnut Thoroughbred racehorse who won the 2011 Preakness Stakes. He also finished second in the 2011 Breeders' Cup Dirt Mile and won the Metropolitan Handicap and Clark Handicap in 2012.

Shackleford was trained by Dale Romans, who raced the colt twice as a 2-year-old with one win. As a 3-year-old, he prepared for the Kentucky Derby with a second-place finish in the Florida Derby. He came fourth in the 2011 Kentucky Derby and then won the Preakness Stakes with odds of 13-1. In doing so, Shackleford became the beneficiary of the largest payoff purse in Preakness history, winning not only the $600,000 winner's purse, but also $550,000 as the XpressBet Bonus winner. Late in the year, he finished second in the Haskell Invitational and Breeders' Cup Dirt Mile. As a four-year-old he won the Metropolitan Handicap in June and the Clark Handicap in November and then was retired. In 2020, he was exported to stud in South Korea.

== Background ==
Shackleford was bred in Kentucky by Mike Lauffer & Bill Cubbedge. He was sired by Forestry out of the mare Oatsee, who was purchased in 2006 by Shackleford's breeders for $135,000. After giving birth to Shackleford, Oatsee was bred to A.P. Indy and sold, in foal, for $1.55 million. His pedigree traces to major sires of significance, including his grandsire Storm Cat and his damsire Unbridled.

He was named after Shackleford Banks, a barrier island system in North Carolina, home to a herd of feral Banker horses and a place often visited by his owners.

Lauffer was previously a co-owner of the filly Rachel Alexandra, prior to her 2009 Preakness win. Lauffer and Cubbedge put Shackleford up for sale as a yearling at the Keeneland auction, but when the bids failed to reach the reserve price of $275,000, they bought back the colt and kept him.

== 2010: two-year-old season ==
Shackleford is trained by Dale Romans. The colt's first race was on October 16, 2010, where he finished ninth in a 7/8-mile (1,400 m) $44,000 maiden special weight race at Keeneland Race Course on a synthetic surface. That race was won by eventual Blue Grass Stakes runner-up and Kentucky Derby starter Twinspired. In November 2010, his second start, Shackleford won a $59,000 maiden special weight race at Churchill Downs on dirt at 7/8-mile (1,400 m), taking the rail down the stretch and prevailing over a field of 11.

== 2011: three-year-old season ==
Shackleford's first start as a three-year-old was an allowance race at Gulfstream Park on February 5, 2011, at 1 1/8-mile (1,800 m). He was ridden by his soon-to-be regular jockey, Jesus Castanon. In that race, he broke well and stalked the leader from second position, then put on a burst of speed and drew clear to win. Romans next entered Shackleford in the Grade II Fountain of Youth Stakes on February 26 at Gulfstream Park. In that race, he was far back early and attempted to rally on the far turn but was hung out wide. He faltered in the stretch and finished fifth to Soldat.

In April 2011, Shackleford was entered in the Grade 1 $1,000,000 Florida Derby, again at Gulfstream. He drew post number 5 and was listed at post time as a 60-1 longshot. Breaking slowly, he floated wide going into the club house turn. On that turn, he took over the lead from Arch Traveler and To Honor and Serve in a field that stretched 14 lengths back to Dialed In at the rear. Shackleford led down the back stretch and around the final turn, setting a 1/2-mile (800 m) fraction of 46.3 and a 3/4-mile (1,200 m) in 1:10.6. At the top of the lane, he was challenged by To Honor and Serve and repelled him. Three strides from the wire, he was caught by eventual Kentucky Derby co-favorite Dialed In and just missed the win, finishing second by a head.

That second-place finish earned Shackleford a purse of $200,000 and enough graded earnings to enter the Kentucky Derby. In addition, by virtue of his start in the Fountain of Youth Stakes and his top-three finish in the Florida Derby, the colt became eligible for the XpressBet Consolation Bonus $550,000, part of the Preakness 5.5 Million Dollar Bonus program, if he won the Preakness Stakes. The bonus would pay $500,000 to the owner and $50,000 to the trainer of a Preakness winner who had finished in the top 3 of either the Florida Derby or the Santa Anita Derby and finished in one of a set of other listed races.

=== Triple Crown races ===
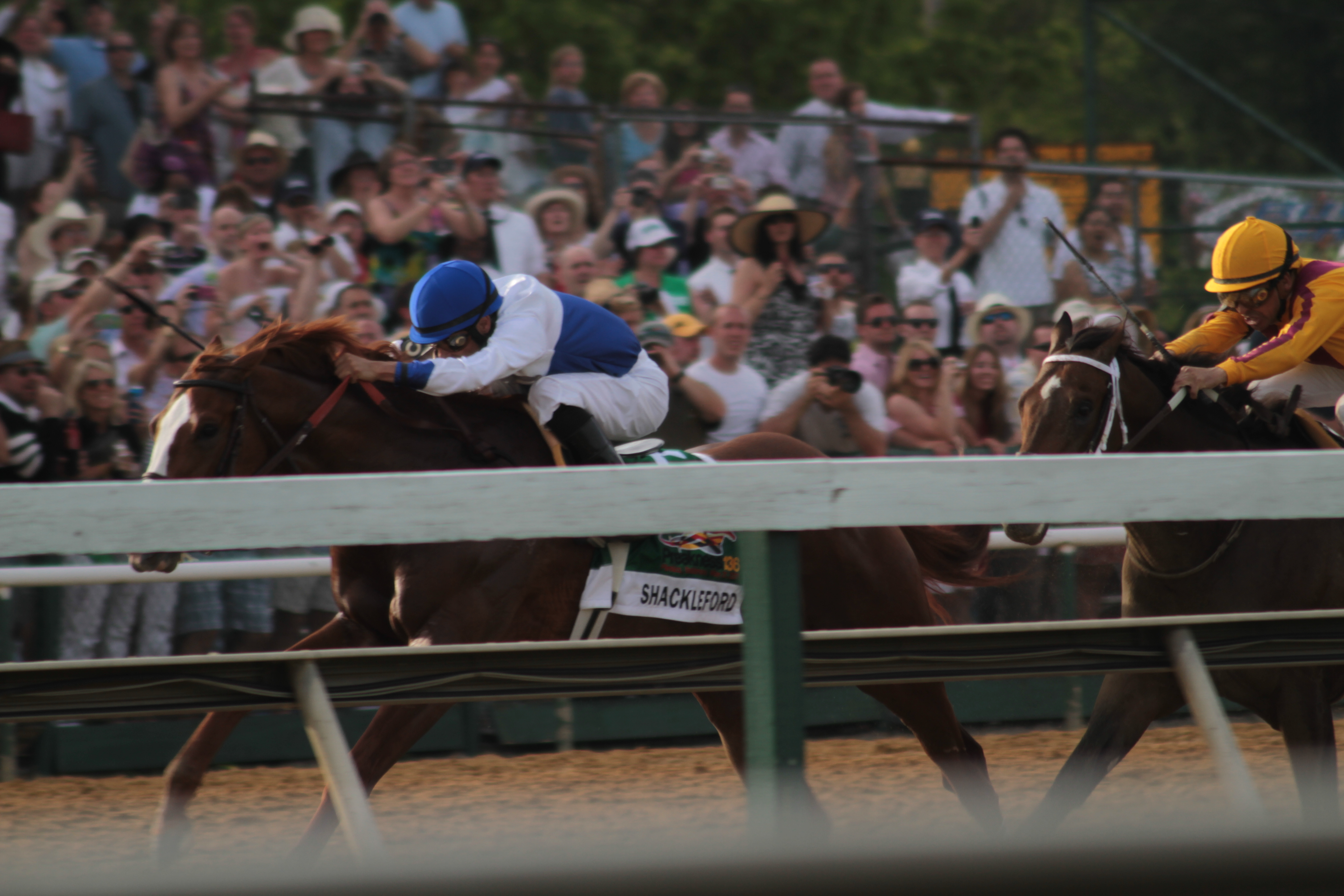
Shackleford (left) leading Astrology in the stretch during the 2011 Preakness Stakes.

In the 2011 Kentucky Derby, Shackleford broke well and outran Comma To the Top for the lead passing the stands for the first time. He continued to lead around the clubhouse turn and into the stretch. With about 200 yards (183 m) to go, he was overtaken by the eventual winner, Animal Kingdom, who won by 2 3/4 lengths. Meanwhile, Shackleford, now in second place with about 50 yards (46 m) left to go, was caught by Nehro and Mucho Macho Man. He finished fourth by a length and a half in the field of 20.

Two weeks later, at the 2011 Preakness Stakes, Shackleford went off at odds of 13–1. He broke from the 5 gate in a capacity field of 14. Passing the grandstand for the first time, Flashpoint took the lead with Shackleford at his flank in a fast 22-3/5 for the first 1/4-mile (402 m). Down the backstretch, the leaders slowed the pace, clocking 3/4-mile (1,200 m) in 1:12.01. At the top of the home stretch, Shackleford took the lead. Astrology challenged him until the 200 yards (183 m) mark. Castanon then used the whip and Shackleford accelerated, holding off the strong late charge of Animal Kingdom to win by half a length.

Bets on Shackleford paid $27.20, $10.20 and $6.80. With that win, Shackleford became the beneficiary of the largest payoff purse in Preakness history. He won $600,000 for coming in first in the Preakness and $550,000 as the XpressBet Bonus winner for a total payout of $1,150,000.

On June 11, 2011, the three year-old finished fifth in the Belmont Stakes after holding the lead for much of the race on a sloppy track. As the pacesetter, Shackleford led throughout most of the 1 1/2-mile race, which started with a moderate quarter-mile in :23.9, then slowed to a leisurely :49.0 for the opening half, 1:14.5 for three-quarters, and 1:39.9 for a mile. After leading the first nine furlongs, he faded in the stretch. Winner Ruler On Ice as well as Stay Thirsty, Brilliant Speed and Nehro passed him.

=== Triple Crown summary ===
Shackleford's first- and fourth-place finishes in Preakness Stakes and Kentucky Derby respectively handed the Triple Crown's consolation title to Animal Kingdom. But Shackleford ended the trifecta of classic races with the a second-place finish in the Triple Crown Productions' Highest combined Triple Crown finish for the 2011 season. He was outfinished three year-old archrival Animal Kingdom by three points, 15 points to 12 points. Ruler on Ice finished third with ten points and Nehro finished fourth with six points. That finish put Shackleford squarely in contention (along with Animal Kingdom) for the "Eclipse Award" as the American Champion Three-Year-Old Male Horse.

=== Remainder of season ===
On July 31, 2011, Shackleford lost by a head in the Haskell Invitational at Monmouth Park in New Jersey to the Bob Baffert-trained colt Coil, who had a six-pound weight break advantage. In that race, Shackleford stumbled at the start, then caught up down the backstretch. Around the final turn, he took the lead. On August 27, 2011, Shackleford was eighth in the 2011 Travers Stakes, which was won by the Pletcher-trained colt Stay Thirsty. On October 1, 2011, he finished second to Wilburn in the Indiana Derby. On November 5, 2011, he ran second to Caleb's Posse in the Breeders' Cup Dirt Mile. On January 3, 2012, Shackleford was nominated as one of three finalists at the Eclipse Award for American Champion Three-Year-Old Male Horse, but the award went to Animal Kingdom.

== 2012: four-year-old season ==
On February 11, Shackleford was seventh out of a field of eleven horses in the Grade 1 Donn Handicap run at Gulfstream Park. Ruler on Ice also ran and finished eighth. On April 7, 2012, Shackleford ran in the $400,000 Grade 1 Carter Handicap at seven furlongs at Aqueduct Racetrack. Longshot Jackson Bend won by a nose over Caleb's Posse, with Shackleford another length and a half back in third.

Returning to Churchill Downs on Derby Day, May 5, 2012, Shackleford raced in the $400,000 Grade 2 Churchill Downs Stakes at seven furlongs on the dirt. In that race, he beat the favorite, American Champion Sprint Horse Amazombie, by a length. The two horses separated themselves from the rest of the field by five lengths with Shackleford on the inside. Just inside the sixteenth pole, he edged away and beat Amazombie under jockey Mike Smith by a length. Gantry was another five and a half lengths back in the third. The time was 1:21 on a fast track.

On Memorial Day, May 28, 2012, Shackleford raced in what analysts called the deepest field of the year featuring favorites To Honor and Serve, Caleb's Posse, Jackson Bend and Caixa Eletronica in the $750,000 Grade 1 Metropolitan Handicap (known by most as the Met Mile run at one mile on the dirt at Belmont Park). Shackleford had just enough left to withstand the furious late rush of Caleb's Posse, stopping the clock in 1:33 1/5 over the fast track to win by a nose. Favorite To Honor and Serve was another three and half lengths back in third. With this win, Shackleford turned the tables on old rival Caleb's Posse, who beat him in the 2011 Breeders' Cup Dirt Mile. The horses met each other four times, with each winning two races. However, Caleb's Posse retired soon after the Met Mile.

On November 23, Shackleford ended his career with a victory in the Grade 1, $500,000 Clark Handicap at Churchill Downs with new jockey and hall of famer Johnny Velazquez on board He defeated Take Charge Indy by one length in the 1-1/8 mile race that he completed in a time of 1:49.12 seconds.

== Stud career ==
Shackleford was retired to stud duty in November 2012, and was sent to the Darby Dan Farm in Lexington, Kentucky. He stood for an initial fee of $20,000. He was sold to the Korea Racing Authority in January 2020 and was exported to South Korea.

Shackleford sired his first winner on May 27, 2016, when juvenile colt Little Nappy won a 4 1/2 furlongs (3,000 ft; 910 m) maiden special weight at Gulfstream Park.

=== Notable progeny ===
c = colt, f = filly, g = gelding

Foaled	Name	Sex	Major Wins
2015	Promises Fulfilled	c	H. Allen Jerkens Memorial Stakes
2018	Stilleto Boy	g	Santa Anita Handicap

== Pedigree ==
Shackleford was sired by Forestry, and out of Oatsee, a daughter of Unbridled. Oatsee was purchased in 2006 by Shackleford's owners for $135,000, and after giving birth to Shackleford, was bred to A.P. Indy and sold, in foal, for $1.55 million.

Shackleford has champion breeding lines on both sides of the pedigree. Northern Dancer, the paternal great-grand sire of Forestry, was a four-time leading sire in Great Britain and Ireland, leading sire in North America (1971), and the leading broodmare sire in North America (1991). He also traces on his sire's side to fourth generation sires, Secretariat, His Majesty and Dr. Fager, who were all leading sires. Mr. Prospector, the paternal great-grandsire of his dam Oatsee, was a nine-time leading broodmare sire in North America twice the leading sire in North America. Shackleford's grandsire, Storm Cat, was a two-time leading sire in North America and his maternal grandsire is Unbridled, who sired multiple winners of various Triple Crown races.

Shackleford inherits speed through his sire, Forestry, who had his most notable wins at one-turn events: the Grade 1 7/8-mile (1,400 m) King's Bishop Stakes at Saratoga and the Grade 2 1 1/16-mile (1,700 m) Dwyer Stakes at Belmont. Most of Forestry's notable progeny are similarly described, with a few exceptions. In addition, Forestry's maternal grandsire was Pleasant Colony, who won both the Kentucky Derby and, like Shackleford, the Preakness Stakes. Shackleford inherits stamina through his dam. His breeding is considered most similar to Etched, another son of Forestry who is a two-time Grade 2 winner at 1 1/8-mile (1,800 m). Both inherited stamina from Unbridled-line mares, with Etched having Unbridled's Song as a grandsire and Shackleford's grandsire being Unbridled himself. Oatsee has transmitted Unbridled's stamina, producing six racing foals of whom four have been winners including Lady Joanne, who won the Alabama Stakes and Baghdaria, winner of the Silverbulletday Stakes, Grade 3 Iowa Oaks and G3 Indiana Oaks. Unbridled was a 1 1/4-mile (2,000 m) specialist who won both the Kentucky Derby and the Breeders' Cup Classic in 1990. Unbridled has sired progeny who separately won each of the Triple Crown races, including Grindstone, Red Bullet, and Empire Maker, achieving the feat only three years after his grandsire Mr. Prospector did with Fusaichi Pegasus, Tank's Prospect and Conquistador Cielo. Shackleford's pedigree chart is as follows:

== Racing statistics ==
Date	Age	Distance	Race	Grade	Track	Surface	Odds	Time	Field	Finish	Margin	Jockey	Trainer	Owner	Citation
October 16, 2010	2	7 furlongs (7/8 mile or1,400 m)	Maiden Special Weight	Maiden	Keeneland	Synthetic	17.90	N/A	12	9	N/A	Robby Albarado	Dale Romans	Lauffer and Cubbedge	
November 27, 2010	2	7 furlongs (7/8 mile or1,400 m)	Maiden Special Weight	Maiden	Churchill Downs	Dirt	25.00	1:23.65	12	1	Head	Frederic Lenclud	Dale Romans	Lauffer and Cubbedge	
February 5, 2011	3	9 furlongs (1 1/8 miles or1,800 m)	Allowance	None	Gulfstream Park	Dirt	4.60	1:50.04	6	1	2.25 Lengths	Jesus Castanon	Dale Romans	Laufferl and Cubbedge	
February 26, 2011	3	9 furlongs (1 1/8 miles or1,800 m)	Fountain of Youth Stakes	2	Gulfstream Park	Dirt	17.00	N/A	8	5	N/A	Jesus Castanon	Dale Romans	Lauffer and Cubbedge	
April 3, 2011	3	9 furlongs (1 1/8 miles or1,800 m)	Florida Derby	1	Gulfstream Park	Dirt	68.90	1:50.07	8	2	Head	Jesus Castanon	Dale Romans	Lauffer and Cubbedge	
May 7, 2011	3	10 furlongs (1 1/4 miles or2,000 m)	Kentucky Derby	1	Churchill Downs	Dirt	23.10	N/A	19	4	N/A	Jesus Castanon	Dale Romans	Lauffer and Cubbedge	
May 21, 2011	3	9 1/2 furlongs (1 3/16 miles or 1,900 m)	Preakness Stakes	1	Pimlico Race Course	Dirt	12.60	1:56.47	14	1	0.5 Lengths	Jesus Castanon	Dale Romans	Lauffer and Cubbedge	
June 11, 2011	3	12 furlongs (1 1/2 miles or 2,414 m)	Belmont Stakes	1	Belmont Park	Dirt	6.30	N/A	12	5	N/A	Jesus Castanon	Dale Romans	Lauffer and Cubbedge	
July 31, 2011	3	9 furlongs (1 1/8 miles or1,800 m)	Haskell Invitational	1	Monmouth Park	Dirt	1.50	1:48.20	8	2	Neck	Jesus Castanon	Dale Romans	Lauffer and Cubbedge	
August 27, 2011	3	10 furlongs (1 1/4 miles or2,000 m)	Travers Stakes	1	Saratoga Race Course	Dirt	3.70	2:03.03	10	8	N/A	Jesus Castanon	Dale Romans	Lauffer and Cubbedge	
October 1, 2011	3	8.5 furlongs (1 1/16 miles or1,700 m)	Indiana Derby	2	Hoosier Park	Dirt	1.10	1:43.60	7	2	0.75 Lengths	Jesus Castanon	Dale Romans	Lauffer and Cubbedge	
November 5, 2011	3	8 furlongs (1 mile or1,600 m)	Breeders' Cup Dirt Mile	1	Churchill Downs	Dirt	5.70	1:34.59	9	2	4 Lengths	Jesus Castanon	Dale Romans	Lauffer and Cubbedge	
February 11, 2012	4	9 furlongs (1 1/8 miles or1,800 m)	Donn Handicap	1	Gulfstream Park	Dirt	3.00	N/A	11	7	N/A	Jesus Castanon	Dale Romans	Lauffer and Cubbedge	
April 7, 2012	4	7 furlongs (7/8 mile or1,400 m)	Carter Handicap	1	Aqueduct Racetrack	Dirt	3.40	1:22.32	5	3	1.5 Lengths	Jesus Castanon	Dale Romans	Lauffer and Cubbedge	
May 5, 2012	4	7 furlongs (7/8 mile or1,400 m)	Churchill Downs Stakes	2	Churchill Downs	Dirt	1.80	1:21.06	8	1	One Length	Jesus Castanon	Dale Romans	Lauffer and Cubbedge	
May 28, 2012	4	8 furlongs (1 mile or1,600 m)	Metropolitan Handicap	1	Belmont Park	Dirt	3.00	1:33.30	6	1	Nose	John Velazquez	Dale Romans	Lauffer and Cubbedge	

== Pedigree ==
Pedigree of Shackleford
Sire Forestry B. 1996	Storm Cat (LS-2); 1983	Storm Bird; 1978	Northern Dancer (LS-1, LBS-1, LSUK-4) 1961
Sire Forestry B. 1996	Storm Cat (LS-2); 1983	Storm Bird; 1978	South Ocean 1967
Sire Forestry B. 1996	Storm Cat (LS-2); 1983	Terlingua; 1976	Secretariat (LBS-1) 1970
Sire Forestry B. 1996	Storm Cat (LS-2); 1983	Terlingua; 1976	Crimson Saint 1969
Sire Forestry B. 1996	Shared Interest; 1988	Pleasant Colony; 1978	His Majesty (LS-1) 1968
Sire Forestry B. 1996	Shared Interest; 1988	Pleasant Colony; 1978	Sun Colony 1968
Sire Forestry B. 1996	Shared Interest; 1988	Surgery; 1976	Dr. Fager (LS-1) 1964
Sire Forestry B. 1996	Shared Interest; 1988	Surgery; 1976	Bold Sequence 1961
Dam Oatsee Ch. 1997	Unbridled; 1987	Fappiano; 1977	Mr. Prospector (LS-2, LBS-9) 1970
Dam Oatsee Ch. 1997	Unbridled; 1987	Fappiano; 1977	Killaloe 1970
Dam Oatsee Ch. 1997	Unbridled; 1987	Gana Facil; 1981	Le Fabuleux 1961
Dam Oatsee Ch. 1997	Unbridled; 1987	Gana Facil; 1981	Charedi 1976
Dam Oatsee Ch. 1997	With Every Wish; 1991	Lear Fan; 1981	Roberto 1969
Dam Oatsee Ch. 1997	With Every Wish; 1991	Lear Fan; 1981	Wac 1969
Dam Oatsee Ch. 1997	With Every Wish; 1991	Amo; 1985	Hold Your Peace 1969
Dam Oatsee Ch. 1997	With Every Wish; 1991	Amo; 1985	Taminette 1973
