= Reeves Thoroughbred Racing =

Coordinates: 34.07479°N 84.06165°W

Reeves Thoroughbred Racing silks

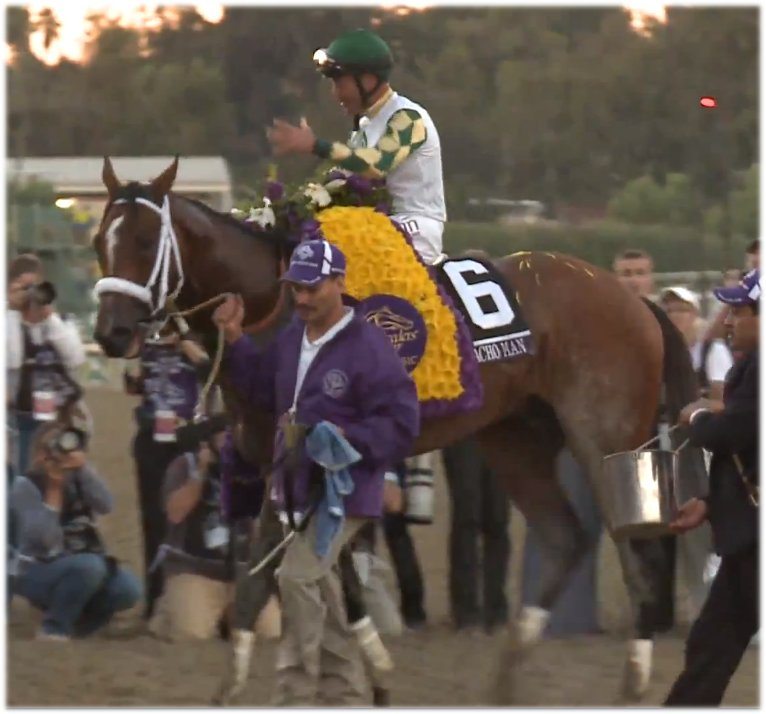
Mucho Macho Man is a notable race horse owned by Reeves Thoroughbred Racing

Reeves Thoroughbred Racing is a horse racing partnership headquartered in Suwanee, Georgia, formed in 2009 by Dean and Patti Reeves. The stable and ownership partners are the owners of 2013 Breeders' Cup Classic winner Mucho Macho Man.

In September 2011, Dean Reeves hired Jonathan "Finn" Green to be the racing manager for the operation. Green worked closely with Kathy Ritvo in mapping the career of Mucho Macho Man. Ritvo has been the horse trainer for the race horses of the partnership since 2010.

Mucho Macho Man was awarded the 2013 Secretariat Vox Populi Award, recognizing the struggles the horse had overcome in reaching success, as well as the accomplishments of his connections. He was also named Florida-bred Horse of the Year for 2013, noting that he was only the third Florida-bred horse to win the Classic, after Unbridled and Skip Away. His win in the Classic was also selected as the National Thoroughbred Racing Association's "Moment of the Year."

The Reeves' are heavily involved with the Georgia Horse Racing Coalition, an organization with a mission to bring horse racing to Georgia. As of 2014, Dean Reeves is the president of the organization. Their work with the Georgia Horse Racing coalition has included commissioning studies on the economic benefits of horse racing for the state, and they began a lobbying effort with the 2014 state legislative session. The Governor, Nathan Deal, holds the position that an amendment to the Georgia state constitution would be required, as gambling is involved. Dean Reeves holds the position that parimutuel wagering is distinguishable from casino-style gambling.
