= Secretariat Vox Populi Award =

The Secretariat Vox Populi Award, also known as the "Voice of the People" award, was established in 2010 by Penny Chenery, who was the owner of Secretariat. The annual award "recognizes the horse whose popularity and racing excellence best resounded with the American public and gained recognition for Thoroughbred racing."

Recipients of the award to date:

Year	Horse	Trainer	Owner
2023	Cody's Wish	Bill Mott	Godolphin
2022	Cody's Wish	Bill Mott	Godolphin
2021	Hot Rod Charlie	Doug O'Neill	Boat Racing LLC, Gainesway Stable, Roadrunner Racing, and William Strauss
2020	Authentic	Bob Baffert	Spendthrift Farm, MyRaceHorse Stable, Madaket Stables, Starlight Racing
2019	Bricks and Mortar	Chad Brown	Klaravich Stables & William H. Lawrence
2018	Winx	Chris Waller	Magic Bloodstock Racing, Richard Treweeke, Debbie Kepitis
2017	Ben's Cat	King T. Leatherbury	The Jim Stable
2016	California Chrome	Art Sherman & Alan Sherman	California Chrome, LLC
2015	American Pharoah	Bob Baffert	Zayat Stables
2014	California Chrome	Art Sherman	Perry Martin & Steve Coburn
2013	Mucho Macho Man	Kathy Ritvo	Reeves Thoroughbred Racing
2012	Paynter	Bob Baffert	Zayat Stables
2011	Rapid Redux	David J. Wells	Robert Cole Jr.
2010	Zenyatta	John Shirreffs	Jerry & Ann Moss

As of 2013, the award was chosen by a combined vote of the general public, conducted online; plus a vote of the Vox Populi committee, and a vote by Chenery. After Chenery's death in 2017, the voting procedure changed; as of 2021, six nominees are chosen by a committee of "several distinguished personalities from within and outside the racing industry who all share a keen interest and affection for the sport". Online voting is then turned over to the general public, who can write in their own choices. Voting closes on November 30, with the winner announced in December.

Two horses, California Chrome and Cody's Wish, are the only ones to date that have received the Secretariat Vox Populi Award twice. In 2023 Cody's Wish became the first winner of the award in consecutive years.
