= Sunshine Millions Classic =

- Class: Restricted
- Location: Santa Anita Park, Arcadia, California & Gulfstream Park, Hallandale Beach, Florida, United States
- Inaugurated: 1981
- Race type: Thoroughbred – Flat racing
- Website: sunshinemillions.com

Race information
- Distance: 1 1/8 miles (9 furlongs)
- Surface: Dirt
- Track: Left-handed
- Qualification: Four-year-olds and up
- Weight: Assigned
- Purse: $200,000

The Sunshine Millions Classic is an American race for thoroughbred horses held annually in January at Santa Anita Park in Arcadia, California and at Gulfstream Park in Hallandale Beach, Florida. Part of the eight-race Sunshine Millions series, half of the races are run at one track, and half at the other.

The "Classic" is open to horses four-years-old and older willing to race one and one-eighth miles on the dirt. It is a restricted event currently offering a purse of $250,000.

The Sunshine Millions series races are restricted to horses bred either in Florida or in California.

The racing series was created by the Thoroughbred Owners of California, the California Thoroughbred Breeders Association, the Florida Thoroughbred Breeders' and Owners' Association, Inc., Santa Anita Park, Gulfstream Park, and Magna Entertainment Corporation.

== Records ==
Speed record:

- 1 1/8 miles – 1:45.64 – Go Between (2008)

Most wins by a horse:

- 2 – Mucho Macho Man (2012, 2014)

Most wins by a jockey:

- 3 – Russell Baze (2009, 2011 & 2012)

Most wins by a trainer:

- 2 – Jenine Sahadi (2001 & 2002)
- 2 – Jerry Hollendorfer (2007 & 2012)
- 2 – Katherine Ritvo (2012 & 2014)

== Winners Sunshine Millions Classic since 2003 ==
Year	Winner	Age	State Bred	Jockey	Trainer	Owner	Time	Purse
2018	Jay's Way	5	FL	Emisael Jaramillo	Armando De la cerda	Midwest Thoroughbreds, Inc.	1:50.12	$200,000
2017	Hy Riverside	5	FL	José Ortiz	Antonio Sano	Mar Racing Stable	1:49.39	$200,000
2016	Mexikoma	5	FL	John R. Velazquez	Michael Dilger	Team Valor International	1:48.19	$250,000
2015	Sr. Quisqueyano	5	FL	Edgard J. Zayas	Peter R. Walder	Loooch Racing Stables	1:50.09	$250,000
2014	Mucho Macho Man	6	FL	Gary Stevens	Kathy Ritvo	Reeves Racing	1:48.76	$400,000
2013	Ron the Greek	6	FL	Jose Lezcano	William I. Mott	Brous Stable/Wachtel Stable	1:49.19	$400,000
2012	Mucho Macho Man	4	FL	Ramon Domínguez	Kathy Ritvo	Reeves Racing/Dream One	1:47.91	$400,000
2011	Tackleberry	4	FL	Javier Santiago	Luis Olivares	Luis Olivares	1:48.52	$500,000
2010	Bold Chieftain	7	CA	Russell Baze	Bill Morey Jr.	Hall/Langbein/Robinson/Morey	1:48.33	$500,000
2009	It's a Bird	6	FL	Julien Leparoux	Marty Wolfson	Edmund A. Gann	1:49.35	$1,000,000
2008	Go Between	5	FL	Garrett Gomez	William I. Mott	Peter Vegso	1:45.64	$1,000,000
2007	McCann's Mojave	7	CA	Frank Alvarado	Steve Specht	Mike Willman	1:49.89	$1,000,000
2006	Lava Man	5	CA	Corey Nakatani	Doug O'Neill	STD Racing Stable & Wood	1:49.98	$1,000,000
2005	Musique Toujours	5	CA	Jorge Chavez	John W. Sadler	L. DeBruycker/R. Glassman	1:49.17	$1,000,000
2004	Southern Image	4	FL	Victor Espinoza	Mike Machowsky	Blahut Stables	1:47.67	$1,000,000
2003	Best of the Rest	8	FL	Eibar Coa	Eddie Plesa Jr.	Bea Oxenberg	1:49.40	$1,000,000
