= 2013 Breeders' Cup =

Thoroughbred horse racing event

The 2013 Breeders' Cup World Championships was the 30th edition of the premier event of the North American thoroughbred horse racing year. It took place on November 1 and November 2 at Santa Anita Park in Arcadia, California. The Breeders' Cup is generally regarded as the end of the North America racing season, although a few Grade I events take place in later November and December. The 2013 Breeders' Cup results were highly influential in the Eclipse Award divisional championship voting.

== Breeders' Cup Challenge series ==
The Breeders' Cup Challenge is a series of races that provide the winners of designated races with automatic "Win and You're In" berths in a specified division of the Breeders' Cup. For qualifying horses, the Breeders' Cup organization covers the entry fee and provides a travel allowance of up to $40,000 for the connections of horses from overseas. Thirty-six horses entered in the Breeders' Cup races qualified via the challenge series, including four of the winners. These were:

- Mucho Macho Man, who qualified for the Classic by winning the Awesome Again Stakes
- Beholder, who won the Zenyatta Stakes to qualify for the Distaff
- Dank, who earned her berth in the Filly & Mare Turf by winning the Beverly D. Stakes
- Wise Dan, who won the Woodbine Mile to qualify for the Mile

== Results ==
The two-day attendance for the Breeders' Cup was 94,628, up 5% over 2012, with a Saturday crowd of 58,795, up 7%. Wagering was also up 7% over 2012, though down from the record levels at the 2010 Breeders' Cup at Churchill Downs.

Five Breeders' Cup races were held on Friday, with British-trained horses winning three: London Bridge in the Marathon, Outstrip in the Juvenile Turf and Chriselliam in the Juvenile Fillies Turf. Mizdirection won the Turf Sprint for the second year in a row, while Beholder won at the Breeders' Cup for the second time in a row, following up her 2012 win in the Juvenile Fillies with a victory in the Distaff.

The highlights of the Saturday card were wins by Mucho Macho Man in the Classic and Wise Dan in the Mile. Mucho Macho Man won by a nose over Will Take Charge, while the favorite Game On Dude finished ninth. Kathy Ritvo became the first female trainer to win the Classic. In the Mile, Wise Dan closed from seventh to win by 3/4 lengths. His regular jockey John Velazquez was injured in an earlier race so Jose Lezcano was a late substitution. In the Turf, the only two European-based horses in the field finished one-two, with the longshot Magician prevailing over favorite The Fugue. It was Magician's first race since June and his first start at the distance of 1 1/2 miles. The Juvenile Fillies was marred by the breakdown of Secret Compass and then a controversial disqualification of She's A Tiger for bumping in the stretch.

In the 2013 Eclipse Award voting, six of the eleven flat racing categories were awarded to horses who won at the Breeders' Cup: Wise Dan was named Horse of the Year, Champion Older Male and Champion Male Turf Horse, Beholder was Champion Three-Year-Old Filly, Dank was Champion Female Turf Horse and Groupie Doll was Champion Female Sprinter. In addition, She's A Tiger was voted Champion Two-Year-Old Filly despite her disqualification in the Juvenile Fillies.

== Friday, November 1 ==
Race name	Sponsor	Distance/surface	Restrictions	Purse	Winner
Marathon		1 3/4 miles	3 yrs+	$500,000	London Bridge
Juvenile Turf		1 mile (Turf)	2-year-old colts & geldings	$1 million	Outstrip
Dirt Mile		1 mile (one turn)	3 yrs+	$1 million	Goldencents
Juvenile Fillies Turf		1 mile (Turf)	2-year-old fillies	$1 million	Chriselliam
Distaff		1 1/8 miles	3 yrs+ fillies & mares	$2 million	Beholder

== Saturday, November 2 ==
Race Name	Sponsor	Distance/Surface	Restrictions	Purse	Winner
Juvenile Fillies		1 1/16 miles	2-year-old fillies	$2 million	Ria Antonia
Filly & Mare Turf		1 1/4 miles (Turf)	Fillies & mares	$2 million	Dank
Filly & Mare Sprint		7 furlongs	3 yrs+ fillies & mares	$1 million	Groupie Doll
Turf Sprint	GEICO	About 6 1/2 furlongs (Turf)	3 yrs+	$1 million	Mizdirection
Juvenile Dirt		1 1/16 miles	2-year-old colts & geldings	$2 million	New Year's Day
Turf		1 1/2 miles (Turf)	3 yrs+	$3 million	Magician
Dirt Sprint	Xpressbet	6 furlongs	3 yrs+	$1,500,000	Secret Circle
Mile		1 mile (Turf)	3 yrs+	$2 million	Wise Dan
Classic		1 1/4 miles	3 yrs+	$5 million	Mucho Macho Man
