= Katherine Ritvo =

American horse trainer (born 1969)

Kathy Ritvo
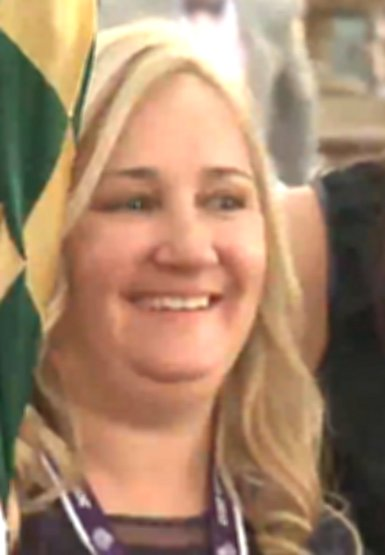
- Kathy Ritvo at the 2013 Breeders' Cup.

Personal information
- Born: February 13, 1969 (age 57)
- Occupation: Horse trainer

Horse racing career
- Sport: Horse racing
- Career wins: 213+ (ongoing)

Major racing wins
- American Classics / Breeders' Cup wins: Breeders' Cup Classic (2013) Graded stakes races Risen Star Stakes (2011); Gulfstream Park Handicap (2012); Suburban Handicap (2012); Awesome Again Stakes (2013); Other stakes races Sunshine Millions Classic (2012)

Racing awards
- Lou Smith Memorial Award

Significant horses
- Mucho Macho Man, Liberada
- Updated on 2017-03-21

Katherine "Kathy" Ritvo (born February 13, 1969) is a race horse trainer who won the Breeders' Cup Classic in 2013 with Mucho Macho Man after having finished a close second in the same race in 2012. She is the first woman to have trained a winner of that race. She also was only the fifth woman trainer to win any Breeders' Cup race, and was the 14th woman trainer to saddle a starter in the Kentucky Derby in the 137 years that race had been run by 2011.

Born Kathy Petro, she grew up in a horse racing family from Massachusetts and married a fellow horseman, Tim Ritvo, in 1990. Kathy and Tim ran a race horse training operation in Florida, and In 2010 she took it over solo when Tim became part of the management of Gulfstream Park race track. Her accomplishments came against the backdrop of having been diagnosed with cardiomyopathy in 2001 and receiving a heart transplant in 2008. In spite of the medication regime and immunity issues that transplant recipients face, she lives a normal life as a horse trainer and shows no signs of organ rejection.

== Background and early career ==
Ritvo was born February 13, 1969, to Peter and Mary Petro. Her family was involved in horse racing, and she was raised in Braintree, Massachusetts. Her parents owned race horses, and after other small business ventures, her father purchased a race track. Her three brothers all established horse racing careers: Michael became a race horse trainer and brothers Louis and Nick became jockeys. Ritvo herself is jockey-sized, standing only 4' 11", and weighing under 100 pounds. She worked for her father as a teenager as a groom, hot walker and exercise rider. She became a licensed trainer when she was 18. Her nephew, Nick Petro Jr., works for her today as an exercise rider.

She met Tim Ritvo in her teens when he was a jockey and they both worked at Suffolk Downs racetrack. Tim and Kathy married in 1990 and soon thereafter moved to Florida, which they viewed as a better place to make a living in the horse racing industry. Tim and Kathy became race horse trainers, and today Tim is the president of Gulfstream Park. Their permanent residence is now Davie, Florida, a suburb of Fort Lauderdale. The couple have two children, Dominique, born in 1992, and Michael, now a jockey, born in 1994. Between 1990 and 1998, Kathy Ritvo trained 150 winning horses, including stakes winners.

== Heart condition ==
Ritvo developed cardiomyopathy, which had killed her brother Louis at the age of 38, as well as her father at age 73. She had been plagued by unusual fatigue since 1998, and her heart condition was formally diagnosed in January, 2001. She began taking medication and trained on a limited basis from 2003 to 2005, starting about 100 horses in that period, with 15 wins. However, her condition deteriorated. She started only one horse in 2005 and had no starters from 2006 until 2009. In 2008, at the age of 39, she was placed on a waiting list for a heart transplant. After a seven-month wait, an organ became available on November 13, 2008, and Ritvo received her new heart that day in an operation that lasted 17 hours. She had been hospitalized for most of the previous six months, and at the time of her surgery her doctors assessed her as having only about two weeks to live. She was discharged from the hospital seven days after her surgery. She later gave a letter to the hospital to pass on to the organ donor's family, but has never heard from them. Ritvo has stated that she wants the donor's family to know she is thankful for her new heart, but respects their privacy.

Since the transplant, Ritvo shows no signs of organ rejection, keeping to a regimen of over 30 pills a day but otherwise living a normal life.

== Return to race horse training ==
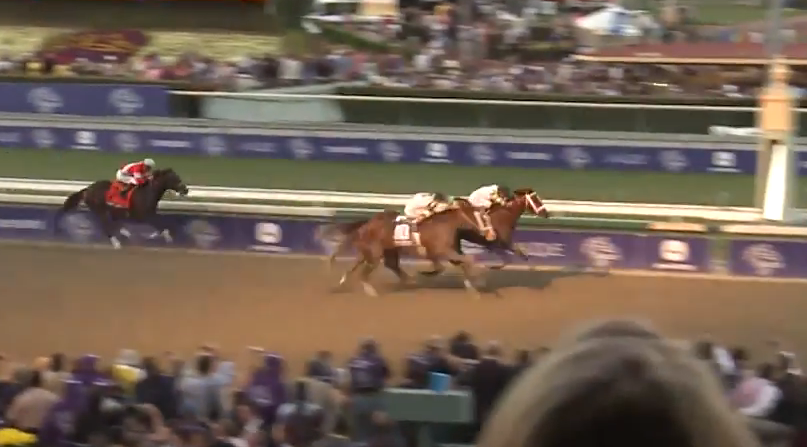
Mucho Macho Man winning the Breeders' Cup Classic

Ritvo's doctors advised her not to return to work in the horse racing industry because of the risks to her immune system posed by the dirt and dust that is part of the environment. Nonetheless, in spite of medical warnings, she returned to horse training within six months, and was credited for saddling four starters in 2009. Though immunity is a concern for transplant recipients, Ritvo remains healthy even though surrounded by horses, dogs, and all of the conditions typical of horse stables.

In 2010, starting horses in 53 races for the year, she also took over the training of then-two-year-old Mucho Macho Man when her husband Tim stopped training horses because he began working as part of the management at Gulfstream Park. Working with owners Reeves Thoroughbred Racing, the horse ran in the 2011 Kentucky Derby. Ritvo was only the 14th woman to train a horse entered in the Kentucky Derby in the 137 years it had been run to that date, and the third-place finish of the horse was the best for a woman trainer in the history of the race. She kept her perspective: "I'm so proud to be in the Derby, but just to get up in the morning is amazing." She next ran Mucho Macho Man in the other two legs of the Triple Crown, the 136th Preakness Stakes and the 143rd Belmont Stakes, where he finished sixth and seventh respectively. Only 13 women trainers had saddled a starter prior to the 2011 Preakness, and Ritvo was only the 10th woman trainer to start a horse in the Belmont. Mucho Macho Man had overcome his own health problems in order to race, including having appeared to be lifeless at birth. Comparing her own experiences to the horse, Ritvo stated, "From the moment I opened my eyes, I felt fantastic. He's Mucho Macho Man and I'm Macho Woman."

She raced Mucho Macho Man in 2012, when he won three graded stakes races. She ran horses in 48 races that year, hitting the board 19 times. Her highest profile race that year occurred when Mucho Macho Man was a close second by a half-length in the 2012 Breeders' Cup Classic.

Somebody gave me a gift...I want to live every day. I want to appreciate every day.

I never thought I'd be able to have a normal life again even if I did survive. But here I am, working at the track every day almost as if nothing ever happened.

— Kathy Ritvo

In 2013, Ritvo ran Mucho Macho Man in assorted races in the eastern U.S., then moved him to Santa Anita Park in early September, almost two months before the Breeders' Cup races, because she felt he "thrived" in California. She entered him in the late September Awesome Again Stakes, where he earned his first Grade I win and free entry fees for the Breeders' Cup Classic. At the Classic in early November, going off as the second favorite, the horse won by a nose. With the win, Ritvo became the first woman trainer to win the Breeders' Cup Classic, and was also only the fifth woman trainer to win any Breeders' Cup race. Ritvo's fellow trainers in the race included Americans D. Wayne Lukas, Todd Pletcher, Bill Mott, and Bob Baffert, as well as Irish trainer Aidan O'Brien. In response to a reporter's question about how it felt to beat several major trainers, she said, "It feels great," but also credited the team behind the horse, and added, "I'm just blessed to be here."

At the end of 2013, Ritvo was named as a recipient of the Lou Smith Memorial Award for Yearly Achievement, given by the New England Turf Writers Association, noting her Massachusetts roots. Mucho Macho Man was awarded the 2013 Secretariat Vox Populi Award, recognizing the struggles the horse had overcome in reaching success and acknowledging the accomplishments of his connections, including Ritvo's own story of overcoming her health issues and going on to train him. The win in the Breeders' Cup Classic was selected as the National Thoroughbred Racing Association Moment of the Year with participation in the online polling for that award up by more than 50% from the previous year, believed to be largely due to the popularity of Mucho Macho Man and the people around him, including Ritvo.

ESPN noted the worldwide success of women horse trainers in 2013, particularly owing to wins in three of the world's major races within a one-month period. In October, Criquette Head-Maarek won the Prix de l'Arc de Triomphe with Treve, the only woman trainer to win the Arc. Then, a few days after Ritvo's horse won the Breeders' Cup Classic, the Melbourne Cup was won by Fiorente, a horse trained by Australian trainer Gai Waterhouse, who was only the second woman to train a winner in that race.

As of 2014, Ritvo trains a stable of about a dozen horses, including all of the horses in race training owned by Reeves Thoroughbred Racing, the owners of Mucho Macho Man. Her son Michael became a jockey and won his first race in March 2014 in his second trip out as an apprentice rider.
