= Dialed In =

American-bred Thoroughbred racehorse

- Breed: Thoroughbred
- Sire: Mineshaft
- Grandsire: A.P. Indy
- Dam: Miss Doolittle
- Damsire: Storm Cat
- Sex: Stallion
- Foaled: February 6, 2008
- Country: United States
- Colour: Dark bay or brown
- Breeder: William S. Farish, Madeleine Pickens & Skara Glen Stables
- Owner: Robert V. LaPenta
- Racing colours: Burgundy with gold shoulder stripes
- Trainer: Nick Zito
- Record: 7: 3-1-0
- Earnings: $941,936

Major wins
- Florida Derby (2011); Holy Bull Stakes (2011)
- Last updated on 4 October 2022

Dialed In (foaled February 6, 2008) is an American Thoroughbred racehorse. He won the 2011 Florida Derby and Holy Bull Stakes, before finishing 8th in the Kentucky Derby. He is also the sire of multiple graded stakes winner Gunnevera.

== Background and Family ==
Dialed In was sired by Mineshaft, a son of A.P. Indy. His dam, Miss Doolittle, was graded stakes placed, and also produced stakes-winning filly Broadway Gold (by Seeking The Gold) and stakes-placed colt Mambo Master (by Kingmambo).

Owner Robert LaPenta bought Dialed In for $475,000 at Fasig-Tipton Saratoga select yearling sale in 2009. Dialed In was trained by Nick Zito during his racing career.

== Racing career ==
=== 2010: Two-year-old season ===
Dialed In ran only once as a juvenile, winning a November Maiden Special Weight event over a distance of 6 1/2 furlongs at Churchill Downs.

=== 2011: Three-year-old season ===
Dialed In began his three-year-old season with a win in the Gr. III Holy Bull Stakes, after which he ran second in an allowance race. He won the Florida Derby in his next start.

Dialed In was made the 5-1 favorite for the 2011 Kentucky Derby after his previous wins, but finished 8th, to winner Animal Kingdom. He made his next start in the Preakness Stakes, improving to finish fourth. After the Preakness, it was discovered that Dialed In had sustained a bone chip injury in his right knee, and underwent surgery.

=== 2012: Four-year-old season ===
Dialed In did not start again until March of the next year, in an allowance race at Gulfstream Park. He finished fourth in what was his final career start.

== Statistics ==
Date	Distance	Race	Grade	Track	Odds	Field	Finish	Winning Time	Winning (Losing) Margin	Jockey	Ref
2010 – Two-year-old season
Nov 12, 2010	6 1/2 furlongs	Maiden Special Weight		Churchill Downs	2.40*	12	1	1:17.77	1/2 length	Julien Leparoux	
2011 – Three-year-old season
Jan 30, 2011	1 mile	Holy Bull Stakes	III	Gulfstream Park	2.70	9	1	1:35.19	1 1/2 lengths	Julien Leparoux	
Jan 30, 2011	1 1/8 miles	Allowance Optional Claiming		Gulfstream Park	0.20*	5	2	1:51.12	(1/2 length)	Julien Leparoux	
Apr 3, 2011	1 1/8 miles	Florida Derby	I	Gulfstream Park	2.90	8	1	1:50.39	head	Julien Leparoux	
May 7, 2011	1 1/4 miles	Kentucky Derby	I	Churchill Downs	5.20*	19	8	2:02.04	(7 1/2 lengths)	Julien Leparoux	
May 21, 2011	1 3/16 miles	Preakness Stakes	I	Pimlico	4.40	14	4	1:56.47	(4 1/4 lengths)	Julien Leparoux	
2012 – Four-year-old season
Mar 3, 2012	1 mile	Allowance Optional Claiming		Gulfstream Park	1.00*	8	4	1:35.94	(1/2 length)	Javier Castellano	

== Retirement and stud career ==
Dialed In retired in 2012 to Darby Dan Farm in Lexington, Kentucky, and begin his breeding career in 2013. His first stud fee was set at $7,500, and remained the price for four years until doubling in 2017 after meeting success as a stallion. Dialed In's first foal was born January 13, 2014, at Sierra Farm near Lexington. The chestnut colt, later named Dial Josh, was out of the Gr.II winning mare Diadella (by Diesis (horse)).

Dialed In's first starter, the gray filly Maximum Edge, was also his first winner. Maximum Edge is also the first winner and first foal for dam Champagne Sparkle, an unraced full-sister to Arkansas Derby winner Danza and a half-sister to Rockport Harbor. Dialed In saw his first black-type stakes winner shortly afterwards, when Ruffenuff won the Princess Margaret Stakes by more than 6 lengths at Northlands Park.

Dialed In's most successful offspring to date is Gunnevera, winner of the Fountain of Youth Stakes, Saratoga Special Stakes, and Delta Jackpot Stakes. Gunnevera finished seventh in the 2017 Kentucky Derby and fifth in the Preakness. Gunneavera amassed $5,561,800 in stakes with Grade I placings in the Breeders' Cup Classic, Dubai World Cup and Woodward Stakes.

Dialed In is also the sire of graded stakes winner The Tabulator, winner of the 2017 Iroquois Stakes He also sired stakes winners Chalon, Montu, Ruffenuff and It's Your Nickel.

Get Her Number was Dialed In's first offspring to win a Grade 1 in the United States when he won in 2020 the American Pharoah Stakes at Santa Anita.

Dialed In's fee was lowered in 2021 from $20,000 to $15,000.

=== Notable progeny ===
His major stakes winners include: c = colt, f = filly, g = gelding

Foaled	Name	Sex	Major Wins
2015	My Opinion (IND)	c	Nilgiris Derby, Mumbai Stayers Cup
2018	Defunded	c	Awesome Again Stakes, Hollywood Gold Cup Stakes
2018	Get Her Number	c	American Pharoah Stakes
2018	Super Stock	c	Arkansas Derby

== Pedigree ==
Pedigree of Dialed In, dark bay or brown horse, April 8, 2019
Sire Mineshaft (1999)	A.P. Indy (1989)	Seattle Slew (1974)	Bold Reasoning (1968)
Sire Mineshaft (1999)	A.P. Indy (1989)	Seattle Slew (1974)	My Charmer (1969)
Sire Mineshaft (1999)	A.P. Indy (1989)	Weekend Surprise (1980)	Secretariat (1970)
Sire Mineshaft (1999)	A.P. Indy (1989)	Weekend Surprise (1980)	Lassie Dear (1974)
Sire Mineshaft (1999)	Prospectors Delite (1989)	Mr. Prospector (1970)	Raise a Native (1961)
Sire Mineshaft (1999)	Prospectors Delite (1989)	Mr. Prospector (1970)	Gold Digger (1962)
Sire Mineshaft (1999)	Prospectors Delite (1989)	Up The Flagpole (1978)	Hoist The Flag (1968)
Sire Mineshaft (1999)	Prospectors Delite (1989)	Up The Flagpole (1978)	The Garden Club (1966)
Dam Miss Doolittle (1998)	Storm Cat (1989)	Storm Bird (CAN) (1978)	Northern Dancer (CAN) (1961)
Dam Miss Doolittle (1998)	Storm Cat (1989)	Storm Bird (CAN) (1978)	South Ocean (CAN) (1967)
Dam Miss Doolittle (1998)	Storm Cat (1989)	Terlingua (1976)	Secretariat (1970)
Dam Miss Doolittle (1998)	Storm Cat (1989)	Terlingua (1976)	Crimson Saint (1969)
Dam Miss Doolittle (1998)	Eliza (1990)	Mt. Livermore (1981)	Blushing Groom (FR) (1974)
Dam Miss Doolittle (1998)	Eliza (1990)	Mt. Livermore (1981)	Flama Ardiente (1972)
Dam Miss Doolittle (1998)	Eliza (1990)	Daring Bidder (1982)	Bold Bidder (1962)
Dam Miss Doolittle (1998)	Eliza (1990)	Daring Bidder (1982)	Daring Step (1967) (family 37)

Dialed In is inbred 4s × 4d to Secretariat.
