= 2011 Kentucky Derby =

Horse race

137th Kentucky Derby
- Kentucky Derby
- Official logo for the 2011 Kentucky Derby
- Location: Churchill Downs
- Date: May 7, 2011
- Winning horse: Animal Kingdom
- Winning time: 2:02.04
- Starting price: 21-1
- Jockey: John R. Velazquez
- Trainer: H. Graham Motion
- Owner: Team Valor International
- Conditions: Fast
- Surface: Dirt
- Attendance: 164,858

The 2011 Kentucky Derby was the 137th running of the Kentucky Derby, on May 7. The race was won by Animal Kingdom, ridden by John Velazquez, trained by H. Graham Motion and owned by Team Valor.

The race took place on Saturday, May 7, 2011, and was televised in the United States on the NBC television network.

A record crowd of 164,858 was on hand at the track for the race.

== Contenders ==
The leading contenders for the race were Dialed In (Holy Bull, Florida Derby), Uncle Mo (Breeders' Cup Juvenile), Nehro (second in the Arkansas Derby), Midnight Interlude (Santa Anita Derby) and Mucho Macho Man (Risen Star Stakes). Pants of Fire, winner of the Louisiana Derby and ridden by Rosie Napravnik, was bet down from odds of 20–1 on the morning line to 8–1 at post time. Animal Kingdom, coming into the race off of a win in the Spiral Stakes over Turfway Park's synthetic dirt course, was largely dismissed at 21–1.

== Details ==
Shackleford (#14) went to the early lead, setting moderate fractions of :23.24 seconds for the opening quarter-mile and :48.63 for the half. He was tracked by Comma to the Top, who tired after the first three-quarters of a mile were completed in 1:13.40, eventually finishing last. Nehro, who had rated a few lengths off the pace, made his move on the far turn and moved into the lead at the top of the stretch. Meanwhile, Animal Kingdom (#16) had settled near the back of the back and was in tenth position going into the final turn. Moving four wide, he advanced into fifth place at the mile pole and closed steadily to win by 2 3/4 lengths. Nehro (#19) finished a neck in front of a late-closing Mucho Macho Man (#13), with Shackleford hanging on for fourth.

The winning jockey, John R. Velazquez, had recently switched to riding Animal Kingdom, after his prior horse, Uncle Mo (former 2nd choice, 9–2), had been scratched earlier within the week.

== Results ==
Finish	Post	Horse name	Trainer	Jockey	Opening odds (to 1)	Final odds	Winnings
1	16	Animal Kingdom	H. Graham Motion	John R. Velazquez	30	20.9	$1,411,800
2	19	Nehro	Steve Asmussen	Corey Nakatani	6	8.5	$400,000
3	13	Mucho Macho Man	Katherine Ritvo	Rajiv Maragh	12	9.3	$200,000
4	14	Shackleford	Dale L. Romans	Jesus Castanon	12	23	$100,000
5	11	Master of Hounds	Aidan O'Brien	Garrett K. Gomez	30	16	$60,000
6	12	Santiva	Eddie Kenneally	Shaun Bridgmohan	30	34	
7	2	Brilliant Speed	Thomas Albertrani	Joel Rosario	30	27	
8	8	Dialed In	Nick Zito	Julien Leparoux	4	5	
9	7	Pants On Fire	Kelly Breen	Rosie Napravnik	20	8	
10	3	Twice the Appeal	Jeffrey L. Bonde	Calvin Borel	20	11	
11	17	Soldat	Kiaran McLaughlin	Alan Garcia	12	11	
12	4	Stay Thirsty	Todd Pletcher	Ramon A. Dominguez	20	17	
13	9	Derby Kitten	Michael J. Maker	Javier Castellano	30	36	
14	5	Decisive Moment	Juan D. Arias	Kerwin Clark	30	39	
15	1	Archarcharch	William H. Fires	Jon Court	10	12	
16	15	Midnight Interlude	Bob Baffert	Victor Espinoza	10	9	
17	10	Twinspired	Michael J. Maker	Mike E. Smith	30	32	
18	20	Watch Me Go	Kathleen O'Connell	Rafael Bejarano	50	33	
19	6	Comma To The Top	Peter L. Miller	Pat Valenzuela	30	35	
(scratched)	18	Uncle Mo	Todd Pletcher	~~John R. Velazquez~~ (rode Animal Kingdom)	4.5		

- Margins – 2 3/4 lengths, neck
- Time – 2:02.04
- Track – Fast

== Payout ==
The 137th Kentucky Derby Payout Schedule

Program Number	Horse Name	Win	Place	Show
16	Animal Kingdom	$43.80	$19.60	$13.00
19	Nehro	-	$8.80	$6.40
13	Mucho Macho Man	-	-	$7.00

- $2 Exacta: (16–19) paid $329.80
- $2 Trifecta: (16–19-13) paid $3,952.40
- $2 Superfecta: (16–19-13-14) paid $48,126.00

== Notable achievements ==
- Animal Kingdom became the first Kentucky Derby winner to have never previously raced on a dirt track.
- Animal Kingdom became the first horse since Exterminator in 1918 to win the Derby with only four previous starts.
- Animal Kingdom became the first horse since Needles in 1956 to win the race off a six-week layoff.

== Subsequent Grade I wins ==
Several horses from the Derby went on to win at the Grade I level.

- Animal Kingdom – 2013 Dubai World Cup
- Mucho Macho Man – 2013 Awesome Again, Breeders' Cup Classic
- Shackleford – Preakness Stakes, 2012 Metropolitan Handicap, Clark Handicap
- Master of Hounds – 2013 Jebel Hatta (UAE)
- Stay Thirsty – Travers Stakes, 2012 Cigar Mile Handicap

== Subsequent breeding careers ==
Leading progeny of participants in the 2011 Kentucky Derby are as follows.

Mucho Macho Man

- Mucho Gusto – Pegasus World Cup

Shackleford - exported to South Korea in 2020

- Promises Fulfilled – H. Allen Jerkens Stakes

Stay Thirsty

- Mind Control – Hopeful Stakes, H. Allen Jerkens Stakes

Dialed In

- Gunnevera – Fountain of Youth Stakes. second in Breeders Cup Classic and Travers Stakes

Sources: American Classic Pedigrees, Equibase, Blood-Horse Stallion Register

== See also ==
- 2011 Preakness Stakes
- 2011 Belmont Stakes
- 2011 Breeders' Cup
