= Animal Kingdom (horse) =

American-bred Thoroughbred racehorse

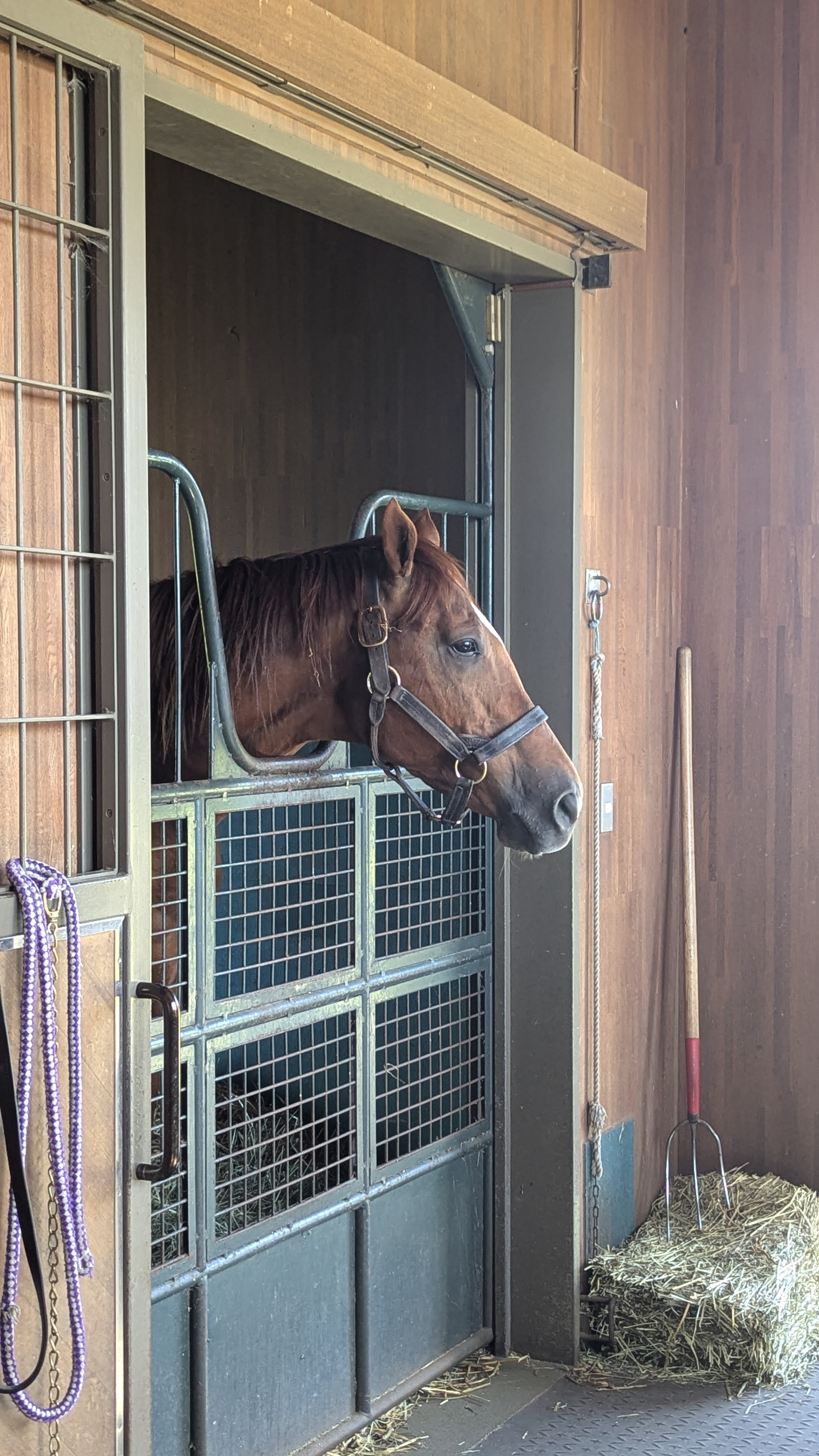
- Animal Kingdom (2008), winner of the 2011 Kentucky Derby, at JBBA's station in Shizunai, Hokkaido.
- Sire: Leroidesanimaux
- Grandsire: Candy Stripes
- Dam: Dalicia
- Damsire: Acatenango
- Sex: Stallion
- Foaled: March 20, 2008 (age 18)
- Country: United States
- Colour: Chestnut
- Breeder: Team Valor
- Owner: Team Valor, Arrowfield Stud & Darley Stud
- Trainer: H. Graham Motion (USA)
- Record: 12: 5-5-0
- Earnings: $8,399,884

Major wins
- Spiral Stakes (2011); Dubai World Cup (2013); Triple Crown race wins: Kentucky Derby (2011)

Awards
- American Champion Three-Year-Old Male Horse (2011)

Animal Kingdom (foaled on March 20, 2008) is a champion American Thoroughbred racehorse who won the 2011 Kentucky Derby and 2013 Dubai World Cup.

His Derby win took place on May 7, 2011, before a record crowd of 164,858. After the Derby, Animal Kingdom finished second in the Preakness Stakes and sixth in the Belmont Stakes before his career was disrupted by injury. He returned to finish second in the 2012 Breeders' Cup Mile before winning the Dubai World Cup as a five-year-old in 2013. Animal Kingdom is the first Kentucky Derby winner to win a Grade One race at the age of five. He has won Grade One races on both dirt and synthetic surfaces.

== Background ==
Bred by Team Valor racing stable and born at Denali Stud in Paris, Kentucky, his sire Leroidesanimaux (Le roi des animaux, French, translates as "King of the animals.") was bred in Brazil and of European bloodlines that traditionally ran on turf. His dam Dalicia was German-bred and never raced on dirt.

The colt was entered into the September 2009 Keeneland Sales as a yearling. The Team Valor partnership that bred Animal Kingdom sold him for $100,000 to a new Team Valor partnership who planned to race him. The chief executive of the partnership is Barry Irwin. The original breeding partnership was dissolved.

== Racing career ==
=== 2010: Two-year-old season ===
At two, Animal Kingdom's training was taken over by Arlington Park trainer Wayne Catalano. In his debut race on September 18, 2010, he ran in an off-the-turf 8.5 furlongs race, coming from the back of the pack to finish second to the favorite, Willcox Inn. Animal Kingdom broke his maiden in his second race, a mile and an eighth Maiden Special Weight race at Keeneland Race Course, this time over Polytrack.

=== 2011: Three-year-old season ===
In his first race at age 3 (March 3, 2011), he ran second in an optional claiming race on a mile on the turf at Gulfstream Park. He broke badly, then raced midpack before sweeping three-wide off the turn to finish a head behind the wire-to-wire winner Powhatan County.

Around this time, Irwin decided to put all Team Valor horses with only one trainer and chose Graham Motion, a British expatriate. Motion, 46 in 2011, moved to the U.S. with his family at the age of 16 and has been involved in Maryland racing for 26 years. Among the top 10 trainers in Maryland from 1995 to 2001, he was based at Laurel Park before moving his stable to the Fair Hill Training Center in 2002. Irwin selected Motion because of his European-style training methods, honesty and resistance to the use of unneeded medications in racing horses. Motion was one of only two top 20 money-earning trainers without a single medication violation in 2010.

On March 26, 2011, Motion entered Animal Kingdom into a Graded stakes race for the first time. Competing at Turfway Park in the Grade III Vinery Racing Spiral Stakes, again over Polytrack, he went to the post as the 3/1 second choice in the betting. Breaking slowly, he raced near the back of the pack, then made a big move to catch eventual Derby contenders Decisive Moment and Twinspired and win by 2 and 3/4 lengths.

Two of Motion's horses were Kentucky Derby contenders: Animal Kingdom and Toby's Corner. Toby's Corner won the Grade I Wood Memorial but dropped out of the running during the week of the race due to a sore leg. Motion was left with Animal Kingdom to start. On the morning of the Kentucky Derby, his morning-line odds were 30:1. By post time, he was 21:1 in his first race on dirt. Animal Kingdom drew post 16 and was ridden to a 2 3/4 length victory in the Derby by jockey John R. Velazquez, who was originally scheduled to ride the early favorite and American Champion Two-Year-Old Colt, Uncle Mo. Uncle Mo was scratched due to a gastrointestinal illness on the Friday before the race, and Velazquez (who was discovered by his agent Angel Cordero) replaced injured rider Robby Albarado on Animal Kingdom. This was the first time Velazquez rode Animal Kingdom, and the jockey's first Kentucky Derby win in 13 tries.

No horse had won the Derby with only four previous races since Exterminator in 1918, although Big Brown's 2008 Derby win came in his fourth start. No horse since Needles in 1956 had won the Derby off a six-week layoff. No horse in the Derby but Secretariat closed his final half-mile faster, :47 1/5.

It was also Motion's first Derby win, and, unfamiliar with the track, he could not find his way to the winner's circle at Churchill Downs until assisted by the trainer of fourth-place Shackleford: Dale Romans.

Animal Kingdom was entered in the 2011 Preakness Stakes which took place on May 21, 2011. He drew the 11th post position. Closing fast from well back of the pack, coming down the middle of the track, he caught every horse but the winner, Shackleford. Animal Kingdom's runner-up finish in the Preakness Stakes was the year's highest combined Triple Crown finish among all starters as recorded by Triple Crown Productions.

At the Belmont Stakes, on June 11, 2011, he finished out of the money attributed to a bad start on a sloppy track. He broke cleanly but encountered trouble almost immediately when cut off by Mucho Macho Man, who was pushed over by Isn't He Perfect. In the process, Animal Kingdom clipped heels with another horse, possibly either Monzon or Mucho Macho Man, causing a stumble that nearly unseated jockey John Velazquez, throwing Velazquez forward onto the horse's neck, losing a stirrup. By the time the jockey regained his stirrup and seat, they were last. However, Animal Kingdom rallied in the homestretch, moving up from last to sixth. Isn't He Perfect finished last and his jockey, Rajiv Maragh, was later suspended for seven days for careless riding.

Following the Belmont, Animal Kingdom came out with a stiff left hind leg. Nuclear bone scans conducted at Rood & Riddle Equine Hospital revealed a small fissure at the proximal aspect of the left hind cannon bone where it articulates with the hock. A small bone defect below the previously observed fissure on his left hock was diagnosed as a slab fracture on June 29, and Animal Kingdom did not race for the remainder of the 2011 season. Two screws were placed in the slab fracture during surgery on June 30, 2011, at the New Bolton Research Center in Kennett Square.

=== 2012: four-year-old season ===
Animal Kingdom recovered well from surgery and was slated to run in the 2012 Dubai World Cup. After winning a 1 1/16-mile turf race at Gulfstream Park, he suffered another fracture in the same leg. The injury was detected after a March 11, 2012, training run at Palm Meadows, and he was withdrawn from competition in the Dubai World Cup.

After a break of more than eight months, Animal Kingdom returned to run in the Breeders' Cup Mile on turf at Santa Anita Park. Starting a 14/1 outsider he finished strongly to take second place behind Wise Dan, ahead of the multiple European Group One winners Excelebration and Moonlight Cloud. In December, it was announced that a majority interest in Animal Kingdom had been sold to the Arrowfield Stud and would begin his career as a breeding stallion in Australia in September 2013. His owners also outlined a plan to race the horse in Dubai and Europe in the early part of the season.

=== 2013: five-year-old season ===
Animal Kingdom began his five-year-old season on February 9 when he finished second to Point of Entry in the Gulfstream Park Handicap. He was then shipped to the United Arab Emirates to contest the Dubai World Cup alongside fellow American challengers Dullahan and Royal Delta. Ridden by Joel Rosario he tracked the leader, Royal Delta, before taking the lead early in the straight, going clear of the field, and holding off the late challenge of Red Cadeaux to win by two lengths, eased down. He became the first American-trained winner of the race since it was switched from dirt to a synthetic surface in 2010. On April 3, 2013, it was announced that Darley Stud had acquired 29% interest in the Dubai World Cup Winner.

In June 2013, Animal Kingdom was sent to England to run in the Queen Anne Stakes at Royal Ascot. He was the third Kentucky Derby winner to compete at the meeting after Reigh Count in 1929 and Omaha in 1936. He started 5/4 favourite for the race, but finished eleventh of the thirteen runners behind Declaration of War.

== Race record ==
Finish	Race	Distance	Jockey	Time	Grade	Runner up/Winner	Track	Date	Notes
11th	Queen Anne Stakes	1 mi (T)	John Velazquez	1:38.48	1	Declaration of War	Ascot Racecourse	June 18, 2013	Was uncharacteristically studdish prior to the race.
1st	Dubai World Cup	1 1/4 mi	Joel Rosario	2:03.22	1	Red Cadeaux	Meydan Racecourse	March 30, 2013	
2nd	Gulfstream Park Turf Handicap	1 1/8 mi	Joel Rosario	1:47.00	1	Point of Entry (1st)	Gulfstream Park	February 11, 2013	
2nd	Breeders' Cup Mile	1 mi (T)	Rafael Bejarano	1:31.78	I	Wise Dan (1st)	Santa Anita Park	November 3, 2012	Placed 2nd after 189 days off
1st	Gulfstream Park Allowance	1 1/16 mi	John Velazquez	1:41.72	None	Monument Hill	Gulfstream Park	February 18, 2012	Favorite to win
6th	Belmont Stakes	1 1/2 mi	John Velazquez		I	Ruler on Ice (1st)	Belmont Park	June 11, 2011	Sloppy track, bumped and stepped on by a rival, resulting in a bad stumble. Jockey lost irons and nearly fell off.
2nd	Preakness Stakes	1 3/16 mi	John Velazquez	1:56.47	I	Shackleford (1st)	Pimlico	May 21, 2011	
1st	Kentucky Derby	1 1/4 mi	John R. Velazquez	2:02.04	I	Nehro	Churchill Downs	May 7. 2011	Won under odds of 21:1
1st	Spiral Stakes	1 1/8 mi	Alan Garcia	1:52.32	III	Decisive Moment	Turfway Park	March 27, 2011	
2nd	Allowance	1 mi (T)	Rajiv Maragh	1:34.66	None	Powhattan County (1st)	Gulfstream Park, Florida	March 3, 2011	
1st	Maiden Special Weight	1 1/8 mi	Robby Albarado	1:49.01	None	Bonaroo	Keeneland Race Course, Kentucky	October 23, 2010	
2nd	Maiden Special Weight	1 1/16	Junior Alvarado	1:45.14	None	Willcox Inn (1st)	Arlington Park	September 18, 2010	

== Stud record ==
Animal Kingdom stood stud in Australia at Arrowfield Stud during 2013. From 2014 to 2019, he stood at Darley's Jonabel Farm in Kentucky. Animal Kingdom was sold to JBBA in October 2019 and stood as a stallion at Shizunai Stallion Station, but was moved to Shichinohe Stallion Station in October 2024.

=== Notable progeny ===
c = colt, f = filly, g = gelding

Foaled	Name	Sex	Major wins
2014	Oleksandra (AUS)	f	Jaipur Stakes
2015	Angel Of Truth (AUS)	g	Australian Derby
2016	Regal Glory (USA)	f	Matriarch Stakes (2021, 2022), Jenny Wiley Stakes, Just a Game Stakes

== Pedigree ==
Pedigree of Animal Kingdom
Sire Leroidesanimaux (BR)	Candy Stripes	Blushing Groom	Red God
Sire Leroidesanimaux (BR)	Candy Stripes	Blushing Groom	Runaway Bride
Sire Leroidesanimaux (BR)	Candy Stripes	Bubble Company	Lyphard
Sire Leroidesanimaux (BR)	Candy Stripes	Bubble Company	Prodice
Sire Leroidesanimaux (BR)	Dissemble	Ahonoora	Lorenzaccio
Sire Leroidesanimaux (BR)	Dissemble	Ahonoora	Helen Nichols
Sire Leroidesanimaux (BR)	Dissemble	Kerali	High Line
Sire Leroidesanimaux (BR)	Dissemble	Kerali	Sookera
Dam Dalicia	Acatenango	Surumu	Literat
Dam Dalicia	Acatenango	Surumu	Surama
Dam Dalicia	Acatenango	Aggravate	Aggressor
Dam Dalicia	Acatenango	Aggravate	Raven Locks
Dam Dalicia	Dynamis	Dancing Brave	Lyphard
Dam Dalicia	Dynamis	Dancing Brave	Navajo Princess
Dam Dalicia	Dynamis	Diasprina	Aspros
Dam Dalicia	Dynamis	Diasprina	Dorle

== See also ==
- List of racehorses
