= Jesús Castañón =

Mexican jockey

Jesus Castanon
Personal information
- Born: March 4, 1973 (age 53) Mexico City, Mexico
- Occupation: Jockey

Horse racing career
- Sport: Horse racing
- Career wins: 2,042 (ongoing)

Major racing wins
- Torrey Pines Stakes (1989); Hoist Her Flag Stakes (1995); Garden State Stakes (1999); Obeah Stakes (1999); Dominion Day Stakes (2002); Hillsborough Stakes (2003); Mecke Handicap (2003); Red Bank Stakes (2004); Chris Thomas Turf Classic (2004); Turfway Park Fall Championship Stakes (2005); Colonel E.R. Bradley Handicap (2007); River City Handicap (2008); Ack Ack Handicap (2009); Cardinal Handicap (2009); Rushaway Stakes (2009); Isaac Murphy Handicap (2010); Opening Verse Stakes (2010); Palm Beach Stakes (2010); Churchill Downs Stakes (2012); Kentucky Jockey Club Stakes (2013); Cornhusker Handicap (2014); West Virginia Governor's Stakes (2014) U.S. Triple Crown wins: Preakness Stakes (2011)

Significant horses
- Paddy O'Prado, Shackleford

Jesus Lopez Castanon (born Jesús López Castañón, March 4, 1973 in Mexico City, Mexico) is a Mexican jockey in American thoroughbred racing who won the 2011 Preakness Stakes. The son of a horse trainer, two brothers were also jockeys in Mexico. Father of four children. He is married to former jockey Rolanda Simpson. Castanon got his first win at Agua Caliente Racetrack in 1989 and later that year in the United States, won the Torrey Pines Stakes at Del Mar Racetrack in California. Since then he has competed at racetracks across the United States as well as in Canada, winning more than 2,000 races.

== 2011 U.S. Triple Crown ==
On May 7, 2011, Jesus Castanon rode Shackleford to a fourth-place finish in the Kentucky Derby, the first leg of the U.S. Triple Crown series. Two weeks later on May 21, aboard Shackleford he won the second leg of Triple Crown, the Preakness Stakes.

=== Year end charts ===
Chart (2005–present)	Peak position
National Earnings List for Jockeys 2005	59
National Earnings List for Jockeys 2007	100
National Earnings List for Jockeys 2008	74
National Earnings List for Jockeys 2009	64
National Earnings List for Jockeys 2010	84
National Earnings List for Jockeys 2011	49
