= 2012 Breeders' Cup Challenge series =

Series of horse races

The 2012 Breeders' Cup Challenge series provided winners of the designated races with an automatic "Win and You're In" Berth in the 2012 Breeders' Cup. Races were chosen by the Breeders' Cup organization and included key prep races in the various Breeders' Cup divisions from around the world.

For 2012, the series consisted of 73 races in 10 countries, 52 of which were Grade / Group One events. Thirteen races were added to the series: the (South African) Queen's Plate, Gran Premio 25 de Mayo, Stephen Foster Handicap, Personal Ensign, Grosser Preis von Baden, Gallant Bloom, Pilgrim, Miss Grillo, Bourbon, Royal Lodge, Middle Park, Beresford, and the Prix de la Foret.

Forty-five horses entered in the 2012 Breeders' Cup races qualified via the challenge series, including seven of the winners. These were:

- Fort Larned, who qualified for the Classic by winning the Whitney
- Royal Delta, who won both the Delaware Handicap and Beldame to qualify for the Ladies' Classic
- Little Mike, who qualified for the Turf by winning the Arlington Million
- Wise Dan, who won both the Woodbine Mile and Shadwell Turf Mile to quality for the Breeders' Cup Mile
- Groupie Doll, who qualified for the Filly & Mare Sprint by winning the Thoroughbred Club of America Stakes
- Shanghai Bobby, who earned his berth in the Juvenile by winning both the Hopeful and Champagne
- Calidoscopio, who qualified for the Marathon by winning the Clasico Belgrano

The winners of the 2012 Breeders' Cup Challenge series races are shown below. The last column shows whether the horse was subsequently entered in the Breeders' Cup, and if so, whether they achieved a top three finish.

Month	Race	Track	Location	Division	Winner	BC Result
January	Queen's Plate	Kenilworth	South Africa	Breeders' Cup Mile	Gimmethegreenlight	not entered
April	Doncaster Mile	Randwick	Australia	Breeders' Cup Mile	More Joyous	not entered
April	TJ Smith Stakes	Randwick	Australia	Breeders' Cup Turf Sprint	Master of Design	not entered
May	Gran Premio 25 de Mayo	San Isidro	Argentina	Breeders' Cup Turf	Al Qasr	not entered
May	Metropolitan Handicap	Belmont Park	New York	Breeders' Cup Dirt Mile	Shackleford	entered
June	Stephen Foster Handicap	Churchill Downs	Kentucky	Breeders' Cup Classic	Ron the Greek	entered
June	Clasico Belgrano	Palermo	Argentina	Breeders' Cup Marathon	Calidoscopio	1st
June	Takarazuka Kinen	Hanshin	Japan	Breeders' Cup Turf	Orfevre	not entered
June	Grand Prix de Saint-Cloud	Saint Cloud	France	Breeders' Cup Turf	Meandre	not entered
June	Shoemaker Mile	Santa Anita	California	Breeders' Cup Mile	Jeranimo	entered
July	Pretty Polly Stakes	The Curragh	Ireland	Breeders' Cup Filly and Mare Turf	Izzi Top	not entered
July	Hollywood Gold Cup	Hollywood Park	California	Breeders' Cup Classic	Game On Dude	entered
July	Smile Sprint Handicap	Calder	Florida	Breeders' Cup Sprint	Gantry	entered
July	United Nations Stakes	Monmouth	New Jersey	Breeders' Cup Turf	Turbo Compressor	entered
July	Greenwood Cup Handicap	Parx	Pennsylvania	Breeders' Cup Marathon	Redeemed	not entered
July	A Gleam Handicap	Hollywood Park	California	Breeders' Cup Filly & Mare Sprint	Switch	3rd
July	Delaware Handicap	Delaware Park	Delaware	Breeders' Cup Ladies' Classic	Royal Delta	1st
July	King George VI and Queen Elizabeth Stakes	Ascot	England	Breeders' Cup Turf	Danedream	not entered
July	San Diego Handicap	Del Mar	California	Breeders' Cup Dirt Mile	Rail Trip	2nd
August	Clement L. Hirsch Stakes	Del Mar	California	Breeders' Cup Ladies' Classic	Include Me Out	3rd
August	Whitney Handicap	Saratoga	New York	Breeders' Cup Classic	Fort Larned	1st
August	Prix Jacques Le Marois	Deauville	France	Breeders' Cup Mile	Excelebration	entered
August	Beverly D. Stakes	Arlington	Illinois	Breeders' Cup Filly & Mare Turf	I'm a Dreamer	entered
August	Arlington Million	Arlington	Illinois	Breeders' Cup Turf	Little Mike	1st
August	Nunthorpe Stakes	York	England	Breeders' Cup Turf Sprint	Ortensia	not entered
August	Ballerina Stakes	Saratoga	New York	Breeders' Cup Filly & Mare Sprint	Turbulent Descent	entered
August	Pacific Classic	Del Mar	California	Breeders' Cup Classic	Dullahan	entered Turf
August	Del Mar Handicap	Del Mar	California	Breeders' Cup Turf	Casino Host	not entered
August	Personal Ensign Stakes	Saratoga	New York	Breeders' Cup Ladies' Classic	Love and Pride	entered
September	Grosser Preis von Baden	Baden-Baden	Germany	Breeders' Cup Turf	Danedream	not entered
September	Turf Monster Stakes	Parx	Pennsylvania	Breeders' Cup Turf Sprint	Ben's Cat	not entered
September	Hopeful Stakes	Saratoga	New York	Breeders' Cup Juvenile	Shanghai Bobby	1st
September	Del Mar Futurity	Del Mar	California	Breeders' Cup Juvenile	Rolling Fog	not entered
September	Irish Champion Stakes	Leopardstown	Ireland	Breeders' Cup Turf	Snow Fairy	not entered
September	Moyglare Stud Stakes	Curragh	Ireland	Breeders' Cup Juvenile Fillies Turf	Sky Lantern	entered
September	Woodbine Mile	Woodbine	Canada	Breeders' Cup Mile	Wise Dan	1st
September	Natalma Stakes	Woodbine	Canada	Breeders' Cup Juvenile Fillies Turf	Spring Venture	entered
September	Summer Stakes	Woodbine	Canada	Breeders' Cup Juvenile Turf	I'm Boundtoscore	entered
September	Gallant Bloom Handicap	Belmont Park	New York	Breeders' Cup Filly & Mare Sprint	Dust and Diamonds	2nd
September	Royal Lodge Stakes	Newmarket	England	Breeders' Cup Juvenile Turf	Steeler	not entered
September	Flower Bowl Invitational Stakes	Belmont Park	New York	Breeders' Cup Filly & Mare Turf	Nahrain	entered
September	Joe Hirsch Turf Classic Invitational Stakes	Belmont Park	New York	Breeders' Cup Turf	Point of Entry	2nd
September	Kelso Handicap	Belmont Park	New York	Breeders' Cup Dirt Mile	Jersey Town	entered
September	Vosburgh Stakes	Belmont Park	New York	Breeders' Cup Sprint	The Lumber Guy	2nd
September	Beldame Stakes	Belmont Park	New York	Breeders' Cup Ladies' Classic	Royal Delta	1st
September	Jockey Club Gold Cup	Belmont Park	New York	Breeders' Cup Classic	Flat Out	3rd
September	Awesome Again Stakes	Santa Anita	California	Breeders' Cup Classic	Game On Dude	entered
September	FrontRunner Stakes	Santa Anita	California	Breeders' Cup Juvenile	Power Broker	entered
September	Beresford Stakes	The Curragh	Ireland	Breeders' Cup Juvenile Turf	Battle of Marengo	not entered
September	Chandelier Stakes	Santa Anita	California	Breeders' Cup Juvenile Fillies	Executiveprivilege	2nd
September	Rodeo Drive Stakes	Santa Anita	California	Breeders' Cup Filly & Mare Turf	Marketing Mix	2nd
September	Zenyatta Stakes	Santa Anita	California	Breeders' Cup Ladies' Classic	Love and Pride	entered
October	Alcibiades Stakes	Keeneland	Kentucky	Breeders' Cup Juvenile Fillies	Spring in the Air	entered
October	Phoenix Stakes	Keeneland	Kentucky	Breeders' Cup Sprint	Sum of the Parts	entered
October	Pilgrim Stakes	Belmont	New York	Breeders' Cup Juvenile Turf	Noble Tune	2nd
October	Miss Grillo Stakes	Belmont	New York	Breeders' Cup Juvenile Fillies Turf	Watsdachances	2nd
October	Champagne Stakes	Belmont Park	New York	Breeders' Cup Juvenile	Shanghai Bobby	1st
October	Frizette Stakes	Belmont Park	New York	Breeders' Cup Juvenile Fillies	Dreaming of Julia	3rd
October	Shadwell Turf Mile Stakes	Keeneland	Kentucky	Breeders' Cup Mile	Wise Dan	1st
October	Breeders' Futurity Stakes	Keeneland	Kentucky	Breeders' Cup Juvenile	Joha	entered Juvenile Turf
October	Thoroughbred Club of America Stakes	Keeneland	Kentucky	Breeders' Cup Filly & Mare Sprint	Groupie Doll	1st
October	Santa Anita Sprint Championship	Santa Anita	California	Breeders' Cup Sprint	Coil	entered
October	Bourbon Stakes	Keeneland	Kentucky	Breeders' Cup Juvenile Turf	Balance the Books	3rd
October	Spinster Stakes	Keeneland	Kentucky	Breeders' Cup Ladies' Classic	In Lingerie	not entered
October	Prix de la Forêt	Longchamp	France	Breeders' Cup Mile	Gordon Lord Byron	not entered
October	Prix de l'Opéra	Longchamp	France	Breeders' Cup Filly & Mare Turf	Ridasiyna	entered
October	Prix Jean-Luc Lagardère	Longchamp	France	Breeders' Cup Juvenile Turf	Olympic Glory	not entered
October	Middle Park Stakes	Newmarket	England	Breeders' Cup Juvenile Sprint	Reckless Abandon	not entered
October	Jessamine Stakes	Keeneland	Kentucky	Breeders' Cup Juvenile Fillies Turf	Moonwalk	entered
October	E. P. Taylor Stakes	Woodbine	Canada	Breeders' Cup Filly & Mare Turf	Siyouma	not entered
October	Nearctic Stakes	Woodbine	Canada	Breeders' Cup Turf Sprint	Next Question	entered
October	Canadian International Stakes	Woodbine	Canada	Breeders' Cup Turf	Joshua Tree	not entered
