= 2012 Breeders' Cup Classic =

Thoroughbred horse race

29th Breeders' Cup Classic
- Breeders' Cup Classic
- Location: Santa Anita Park
- Date: November 3, 2012
- Winning horse: Fort Larned
- Jockey: Brian Hernandez Jr.
- Trainer: Ian Wilkes
- Owner: Janis R. Witham
- Conditions: fast
- Surface: Dirt
- Attendance: 55,123

The 2012 Breeders' Cup Classic was the 29th running of the Breeders' Cup Classic, part of the 2012 Breeders' Cup World Thoroughbred Championships program. It was run on November 3, 2012, at Santa Anita Park in Arcadia, California with a purse of $5,000,000.

Fort Larned, a 9-1 longshot, won the race in frontrunning fashion, holding off a closing drive by Mucho Macho Man.

The Classic is run on dirt at one mile and one-quarter (approximately 2000 m). It is run under weight-for-age conditions, with entrants carrying the following weights:

- Northern Hemisphere three-year-olds: 122 lb
- Southern Hemisphere three-year-olds: 117 lb
- Four-year-olds and up: 126 lb
- Any fillies or mares receive a 3 lb allowance

== Contenders ==
Game On Dude was the favorite for the Classic after winning the Hollywood Gold Cup and Awesome Again. Second in the 2011 Classic held at Churchill Downs, Game on Dude was expected to improve at Santa Anita, a track over which he was undefeated at the time. His frontrunning style was expected to give him a tactical advantage in a field that lacked other speed horses.

He faced a deep field that lacked star power, in part due to the injury and subsequent retirement of Kentucky Derby and Preakness winner I'll Have Another and Belmont Stakes winner Union Rags. The 12-horse field also included:

- Flat Out, two-time winner of the Jockey Club Gold Cup
- Fort Larned, brilliant winner of the Whitney Stakes but beaten in the Jockey Club Gold Cup. His ability to handle the 1 1/4 mile distance of the Classic was an issue
- Ron the Greek, winner of the Santa Anita Handicap and Stephen Foster, but badly beaten in the Jockey Club Gold Cup
- To Honor and Serve, winner of the Woodward Stakes
- Mucho Macho Man, winner of the Suburban Handicap and runner-up in the Woodward

== Race Description ==
Game on Dude, who had been expected to set the pace, broke poorly and then experienced traffic problems that took him out of contention. Fort Larned went to the lead and set a brisk pace, trailed by Mucho Macho Man. Fort Larned opened up a lead of nearly three lengths moving into the far turn, then Mucho Macho Man started to close ground. With an eighth of a mile to go, Fort Larned's lead was down to a half length and his jockey Brian Hernandez, Jr. went to the whip. Fort Larned responded and maintained his lead to the finish line, completing the 1 1/4 miles in a solid time of 2:00.11. Flat Out was well back in third.

It was the first Breeders' Cup win for trainer Ian Wilkes, who had previously been an assistant to Hall of Famer Carl Nafzger. "We had to be there near the front and he was ready today", said Wilkes. "He had galloped great over the track. I knew we were good when he broke sharp. That's where Brian (Hernandez) won the race. We broke sharp and Game On Dude broke bad. I trust Brian because the horse trusts Brian."

On his 27th birthday, Hernandez also celebrated his first Breeders' Cup win. "It's the greatest birthday ever", said Hernandez. "I always had a lot of confidence in him. Ian (Wilkes) and I talked about the race and he told me don't take him out of his game and let him do whatever he wants to do. He has a good cruising speed and I just let him go."

Owner Janis Whitham was also Fort Larned's breeder. She and her late husband had owned the Champion race mare Bayakoa, two-time winner of the Distaff. Bayakoa was Fort Larned's grand-dam.

== Results ==
Finish	Program Number	Margin (lengths)	Horse	Jockey	Trainer	Final Odds	Winnings
1st	4	1/2 length	Fort Larned	Brian Hernandez, Jr.	Ian Wilkes	9.40	2,700,000
2nd	11	6 1/2 lengths	Mucho Macho Man	Mike Smith	Kathy Ritvo	6.30	900,000
3rd	2	3/4	Flat Out	Joel Rosario	William Mott	6.20	495,000
4th	10	Neck	Ron the Greek	Jose Lezcano	William Mott	8.80	300,000
5th	9	2 3/4	Richard's Kid	Garrett Gomez	Doug O'Neill	16.10	150,000
6th	8	4 1/4	Nonios	Martin Pedroza	Jerry Hollendorfer	21.00	
7th	5	2 1/2	Game On Dude	Rafael Bejarano	Bob Baffert	1.30	
8th	1	3 1/4	Pool Play	Miguel Mena	Mark Casse	38.70	
9th	7	14 1/2	Handsome Mike	Mario Gutierrez	Doug O'Neill	25.10	
10th	12	2 1/4	To Honor and Serve	John Velazquez	William Mott	16.10	
11th	6	7 1/4	Brilliant Speed	Junior Alvarado	Thomas Albertrani	45.40	
12th	3		Alpha	Ramon Dominguez	Kiaran McLaughlin	23.50	

Source: Equibase

Times: 1/4 – 0:23.20; 1/2 – 0:46.50; 3/4 – 1:10.12; mile – 1:34.66; final – 2:00.11.
Fractional Splits: (:23.20) (:23.30) (:23.62) (:24.54) (:25.45)

== Payout ==
Payout Schedule:

Program Number	Horse	Win	Place	Show
4	Fort Larned	20.80	9.80	6.80
11	Mucho Macho Man		6.80	4.60
2	Flat Out			5.20

- $2 Exacta (4-11) Paid $125.40
- $2 Trifecta (4-11-2) Paid $617.80
- $2 Superfecta (4-11-2-10) Paid $3,526.60
