= Breeders' Cup Classic top three finishers =

This is a listing of the horses that finished in either first, second, or third place and number of starters in the Breeders' Cup Classic, North America's richest horse race run as a grade one on dirt, it is the final race on Saturday of the Breeders' Cup World Thoroughbred Championships.

Year	Winner	Second	Third	Starters
2026	Sovereignty	The Puma	Knightsbridge	7
2025	Forever Young	Sierra Leone	Fierceness	9
2024	Sierra Leone	Fierceness	Forever Young	14
2023	White Abarrio	Derma Sotogake	Proxy	12
2022	Flightline	Olympiad	Taiba	8
2021	Knicks Go	Medina Spirit	Essential Quality	8
2020	Authentic	Improbable	Global Campaign	10
2019	Vino Rosso	McKinzie	Higher Power	11
2018	Accelerate	Gunnevera	Thunder Snow	14
2017	Gun Runner	Collected	West Coast	11
2016	Arrogate	California Chrome	Keen Ice	9
2015	American Pharoah	Effinex	Honor Code	8
2014	Bayern	Toast of New York	California Chrome	14
2013	Mucho Macho Man	Will Take Charge	Declaration of War	11
2012	Fort Larned	Mucho Macho Man	Flat Out	12
2011	Drosselmeyer	Game On Dude	Ruler on Ice	12
2010	Blame	Zenyatta	Fly Down	12
2009	Zenyatta	Gio Ponti	Twice Over	12
2008	Raven's Pass	Henrythenavigator	Tiago	12
2007	Curlin	Hard Spun	Awesome Gem	9
2006	Invasor	Bernardini	Premium Tap	13
2005	Saint Liam	Flower Alley	Perfect Drift	13
2004	Ghostzapper	Roses in May	Pleasantly Perfect	13
2003	Pleasantly Perfect	Medaglia d'Oro	Dynever	10
2002	Volponi	Medaglia d'Oro	Milwaukee Brew	12
2001	Tiznow	Sakhee	Albert the Great	13
2000	Tiznow	Giant's Causeway	Captain Steve	13
1999	Cat Thief	Budroyale	Golden Missile	14
1998	Awesome Again	Silver Charm	Swain	10
1997	Skip Away	Deputy Commander	Dowty	9
1996	Alphabet Soup	Louis Quatorze	Cigar	13
1995	Cigar	L'Carriere	Unaccounted For	11
1994	Concern	Tabasco Cat	Dramatic Gold	14
1993	Arcangues	Bertrando	Kissin Kris	13
1992	A.P. Indy	Pleasant Tap	Jolypha	14
1991	Black Tie Affair	Twilight Agenda	Unbridled	11
1990	Unbridled	Ibn Bey	Thirty Six Red	14
1989	Sunday Silence	Easy Goer	Blushing John	8
1988	Alysheba	Seeking The Gold	Waquoit	9
1987	Ferdinand	Alysheba	Judge Angelucci	12
1986	Skywalker	Turkoman	Precisionist	11
1985	Proud Truth	Gate Dancer	Turkoman	8
1984	Wild Again	Slew o' Gold	Gate Dancer	8

== See also ==
- Breeders' Cup World Thoroughbred Championships
- Breeders' Cup Distaff (sister race)
