= 2013 Breeders' Cup Classic =

Thoroughbred horse race

30th Breeders' Cup Classic
- Breeders' Cup Classic
- Location: Santa Anita
- Date: November 2, 2013
- Winning horse: Mucho Macho Man
- Jockey: Gary Stevens
- Trainer: Katherine Ritvo
- Owner: Reeves Thoroughbred Racing
- Conditions: fast
- Surface: Dirt
- Attendance: 58,795

The 2013 Breeders' Cup Classic was the 30th running of the Breeders' Cup Classic, part of the 2013 Breeders' Cup World Thoroughbred Championships program. It was run on November 2, 2013 at Santa Anita race track in Arcadia, California for a purse of $5,000,000.

In a photo finish that was later voted the NTRA Moment of the Year, Mucho Macho Man held off late charges from Will Take Charge and Declaration of War to win by a nose. Favored Game On Dude finished ninth.

The Classic is run on dirt at one mile and one-quarter (approximately 2000 m). It is run under weight-for-age conditions, with entrants carrying the following weights:

- Northern Hemisphere three-year-olds: 122 lb
- Southern Hemisphere three-year-olds: 117 lb
- Four-year-olds and up: 126 lb
- Any fillies or mares receive an allowance of 3 lb

== Contenders ==
Game On Dude was the favorite for the Classic after winning six straight starts leading up to the race, including California's three most prestigious races for older horses – the Santa Anita Handicap, Hollywood Gold Cup and Pacific Classic. A win at the Breeders' Cup would have made Game On Dude the favorite for Horse of the Year honors.

The second choice was Mucho Macho Man, who had finished second in the 2012 Classic. He was pulled up in his first start of 2013, suffering from what was later determined to be a respiratory illness. He missed months of training while recovering, then returned in the summer with two third-place finishes on the East Coast. Shipping to California to prep for the Classic, Mucho Macho won the Awesome Again Stakes.

Facing them was a highly competitive field, including:

- Paynter – winner of the Woodward Stakes
- Declaration of War – European contender making his first start on dirt. Winner of the Queen Anne Stakes and Juddmonte International
- Fort Larned – winner of the 2012 Classic. His form in 2013 was inconsistent, highlighted by a win in the Stephen Foster Handicap
- Palace Malice – winner of the Belmont Stakes
- Will Take Charge – winner of the Travers and Pennsylvania Derby
- Flat Out – third in the 2012 Classic and winner of the 2013 Suburban Handicap
- Ron the Greek, winner of the 2013 Jockey Club Gold Cup, was a late scratch.

== Race description ==
Game On Dude went to the early lead, joined by Fort Larned and longshot Moreno. Setting a brisk pace, the three exchanged leads for the first three-quarters of a mile before first Moreno, then Game On Dude started to fall back. Meanwhile, Mucho Macho Man raced a few lengths behind until starting his move while racing wide on the final turn, moving to the lead with a quarter of a mile to go. As they entered the stretch, Declaration of War failed to change leads but still moved into second, slowly closing ground on the leader. Will Take Charge also started making up ground on the turn while running six wide. As they approached the finish, the gap between the three horses narrowed until the final stride, where the result was too close to call with the naked eye. A photo finish showed Mucho Macho Man had held on to win by inches, with Will Take Charge a head (roughly a foot) in front of Declaration of War. The finish was later named the NTRA Moment of the Year.

It was the first Classic win for jockey Gary Stevens, who had resumed racing in 2013 at age 50 after having retired seven years earlier due to a series of injuries. "This is a dream come true," he said. "This is the one race missing from my résumé."

Katherine Ritvo became the first female trainer to win the Classic, an especially noteworthy feat for a woman who had undergone a heart transplant in 2008. Ritvo gave credit to the horse and rider. "When Gary waved the stick (after the finish), I figured he won," she added. "He got a great trip. Gary did a fantastic job. When he used 'Macho,' 'Macho' showed up. He is a good horse. I'm excited. If I didn't have the support of my family, I wouldn't be here."

Mucho Macho Man was later awarded the Eclipse Award for Champion older male horse, although he lost out in Horse of the Year balloting to turf horse Wise Dan. Will Take Charge's second place finish helped him earn the title for Champion three-year-old colt.

== Results ==
Finish	Program Number	Margin (lengths)	Horse	Jockey	Trainer	Final Odds	Winnings
1st	6	Nose	Mucho Macho Man	Gary Stevens	Katherine Ritvo	4.00	2,750,000
2nd	10	Head	Will Take Charge	Luis Saez	D. Wayne Lukas	8.60	900,000
3rd	5	3 1/4	Declaration of War	Joseph O'Brien	Aidan O'Brien	6.70	500,000
4th	7	1 1/4	Fort Larned	Brian Hernandez	Ian Wilkes	9.80	300,000
5th	1	2 1/4	Last Gunfighter	Javier Castellano	Chad Brown	46.70	150,000
6th	8	1 3/4	Palace Malice	Rafael Bejarano	Todd Pletcher	8.50	
7th	2	1	Paynter	Martin Garcia	Bob Baffert	20.90	
8th	12	1 1/4	Flat Out	Joel Rosario	William Mott	13.50	
9th	9	8 1/4	Game On Dude	Mike Smith	Bob Baffert	1.70	
10th	4	1/2	Moreno	Joseph Talamo	Eric Guillot	32.00	
11th	3		Planteur (IRE)	Ryan Moore	Marco Botti	43.90	

Source: Equibase

Times: 1/4 – 0:23.39; 1/2 – 0:46.36; 3/4 – 1:10.23; mile – 1:34.84; final – 2:00.72.
Fractional Splits: (:23.39) (:22.97) (:23.87) (:24.61) (:25.88)

== Payout ==
Payout Schedule:

Program Number	Horse	Win	Place	Show
6	Mucho Macho Man	10.00	4.60	3.60
10	Will Take Charge		7.20	4.80
5	Declaration of War			4.80

- $2 Exacta (6-10) Paid $73.00
- $2 Trifecta (6-10-5) Paid $608.80
- $2 Superfecta (6-10-5-7) Paid $3,832.40
