= Opening Verse Stakes =

- Class: Ungraded stakes
- Location: Churchill Downs, Louisville, Kentucky, United States
- Inaugurated: 2004
- Race type: Thoroughbred - Flat racing

Race information
- Distance: 1 mile (8 furlongs)
- Surface: Dirt
- Track: left-handed
- Qualification: Three-year-olds and up
- Purse: $116,500 added

The Opening Verse Stakes is an American Thoroughbred horse race held annually at Churchill Downs. A race on turf over a distance of one mile, it is open to horses of either sex age three and older. The race is named for Opening Verse, winner of the 1991 Breeders' Cup Mile at Churchill Downs, and was run as the Opening Verse Handicap from inception through 2008.

== Historical notes ==
The inaugural running of the Opening Verse took place on June 12, 2004, and was won by Senor Swinger. Owned by prominent Californians Robert & Beverly Lewis and trained by U.S. Racing Hall of Fame inductee Bob Baffert, Senior Swinger returned to win the race for a second time on June 18, 2005.

In 2013 and again in 2020, weather conditions were such that for safety reasons the race was switched from the turf course to the dirt track.

== Records ==
Speed record:

- 1:34.10 @ 1 mile: Crafty Daddy (2020)
- 1:40.41 @ 11/16 miles: Turallure (2011)

Most wins:

- Senor Swinger (2004, 2005)

Most wins by a jockey:

- 2 - Corey Lanerie (2012, 2017)
- 2 - Brian Hernandez Jr. (2016, 2020)

Most wins by a trainer:

- 2 - Bob Baffert (2004, 2005)
- 2 - Dale L. Romans (2012, 2013)
- 2 - Steven M. Asmussen (2014, 2018)
- 2 - Ian R. Wilkes (2016, 2018)

Most wins by an owner:

- 2 - Robert & Beverly Lewis (2004, 2005)

== Winners ==
Year	Winner	Age	Jockey	Trainer	Owner	Dist. (Miles)	Time	Win $	Gr.
2022	Gray's Fable	4	Luis Saez	Roger L. Attfield	Steve Goldfine, Kari Provost & Jeff Zlonis	1 m	1:36.22	$96,722	B/T
2021	Set Piece	4	Florent Geroux	Brad H. Cox	Juddmonte Farm	1 m	1:38.26	$54,126	B/T
2020	Crafty Daddy	4	Brian Hernandez Jr.	Kenneth G. McPeek	Lucky Seven Stable (Mackin Brothers)	1 m	1:34.10	$71,730	B/T
2019	Siem Riep	5	James Graham	Ben Colebrook	Marc Detampel	1 m	1:35.07	$68,776	B/T
2018	Mr Cub	4	Chris Landeros	Ian R. Wilkes	Turf Stable Racing (Rusty Jones)	1 m	1:34.69	$42,780	B/T
2017	Pleuven	6	Corey Lanerie	Philip A. Sims	Nelson McMakin	1 m	1:36.15	$32,993	B/T
2016	Thatcher Street	5	Brian Hernandez Jr.	Ian R. Wilkes	Randall L. Bloch, Phil Milner, John Seiler, Amtietan LLC (Fred Merritt)	1 m	1:38.22	$39,780	B/T
2015	The Pizza Man	6	Florent Geroux	Roger Brueggemann	Midwest Thoroughbreds, Inc.	1-1/16 m	1:43.29	$32,400	B/T
2014	Regally Ready	7	Rosie Napravnik	Steven M. Asmussen	Vinery Stables	1-1/16 m	1:42.26	$39,660	B/T
2013	Silver Max	4	Robby Albarado	Dale L. Romans	Mark Bacon & Dana Wells	1-1/16 m	1:44.34	$39,420	B/T
2012	Guys Reward	5	Corey Lanerie	Dale L. Romans	Michael J. Bruder	1-1/16 m	1:41.98	$44,820	B/T
2011	Turallure	4	Julien Leparoux	Charles LoPresti	Four D Stable (Donna Arnold)	1-1/16 m	1:40.41	$46,380	B/T
2010	Tizdejavu	5	Jesús Castañón	Gregory J. Fox	Michael Cooper & Pamela Ziebarth	1-1/16 m	1:42.35	$37,800	B/T
2009	Race not held								
2008	Inca King	4	Shaun Bridgmohan	Steven M. Asmussen	Heiligbrodt Racing Stable	1-1/16 m	1:42.39	$70,503	L/R
2007	Therecomesatiger	5	Jamie Theriot	Thomas F. Proctor	Charles R. Patton	1-1/16 m	1:43.64	$67,270	L/R
2006	Rush Bay	4	Rafael Bejarano	Thomas M. Amoss	Mueller Thoroughbred Stable, Ltd. & Phoebe Mueller	1-1/16 m	1:42.52	$67,580	L/R
2005	Senor Swinger	5	Brice Blanc	Bob Baffert	Robert Lewis & Beverly Lewis	1-1/16 m	1:42.07	$68,944	
2004	Senor Swinger	4	Pat Day	Bob Baffert	Robert Lewis & Beverly Lewis	1-1/16 m	1:45.82	$68,758	
