= Brian Hernandez Jr. =

American jockey

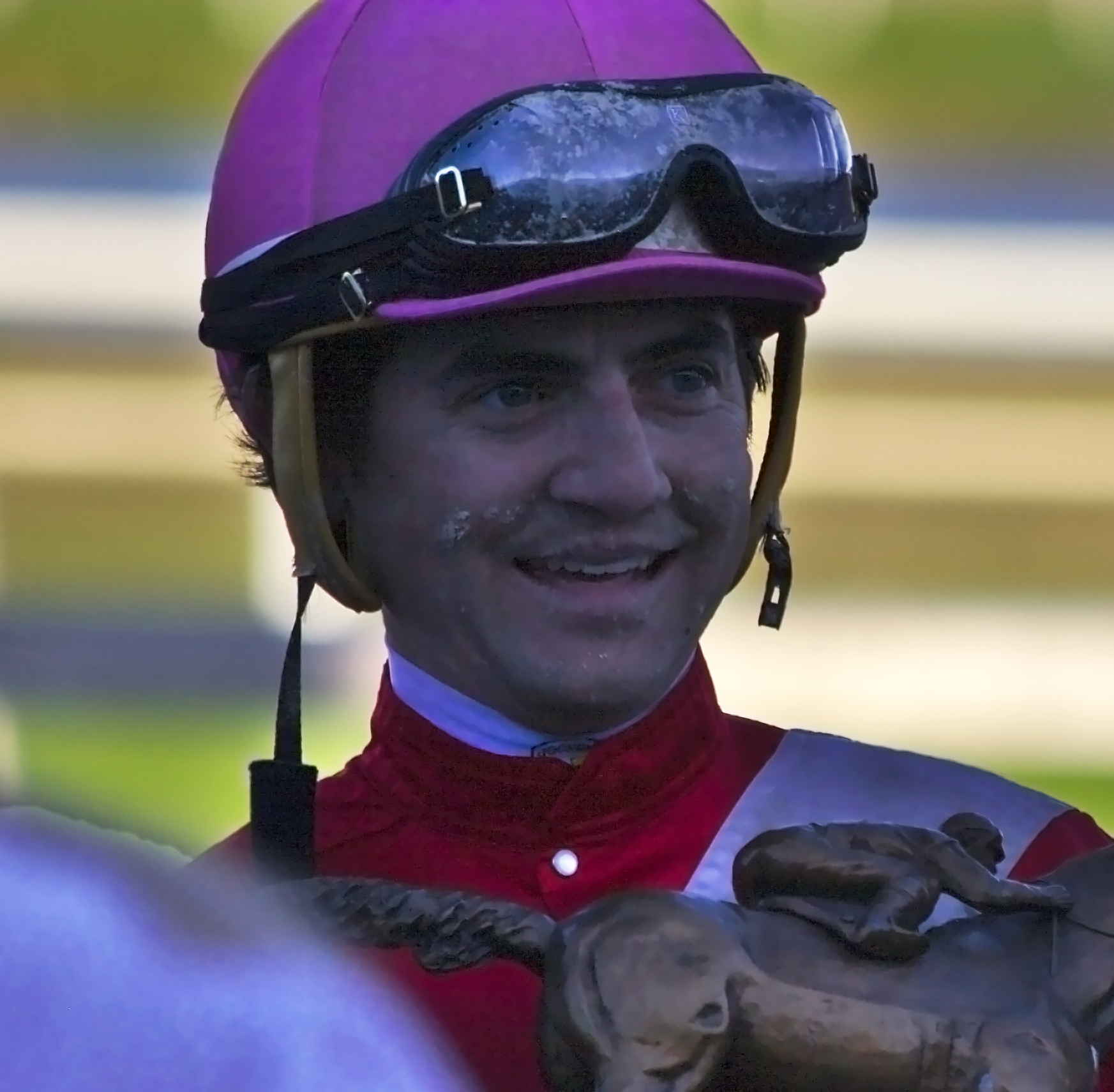
- Brian Hernandez Jr. in 2017

Personal information
- Born: November 3, 1985 (age 40) Lafayette, Louisiana
- Occupation: Jockey

Horse racing career
- Sport: Horse racing
- Career wins: 2,588+ (ongoing)

Major racing wins
- Louisiana Handicap (2004); Remington Springboard Mile Stakes (2004); Indiana Derby (2006, 2012); Edgewood Stakes (2007); Ack Ack Handicap (2012); Cornhusker Handicap (2012); Indiana Oaks (2012, 2023); Whitney Handicap (2012); Beaumont Stakes (2013); Illinois Derby (2013); Opening Verse Stakes (2016, 2020); Indian Summer Stakes (2020); St. Louis Derby (2022); Kentucky Oaks (2024) American Classics/Breeders' Cup wins: Breeders' Cup Classic (2012); Breeders' Cup Distaff (2024); Kentucky Derby (2024)

Racing awards
- U.S. Champion Apprentice Jockey (2004)

Significant horses
- Mystik Dan, Fort Larned, Thorpedo Anna, Rachel Alexandra, McCraken
- Updated on May 4, 2024

Brian Joseph Hernandez Jr. (born November 3, 1985, in Lafayette, Louisiana) is an American Eclipse Award-winning jockey in Thoroughbred horse racing.

== Career ==
He began riding professionally in 2003 and achieved his first win on November 29, 2003, at Louisiana's Delta Downs. As of May 2024, he has over 2,500 victories. In 2004, Hernandez won 243 races and was voted the Eclipse Award for Outstanding Apprentice Jockey. In 2009, he rode Rachel Alexandra to two wins in her first five starts. On August 18, 2012, he won the 1,000th race of his career at Ellis Park Race Course and on November 3, 2012, his 27th birthday, he won the Breeders' Cup Classic aboard Fort Larned at Santa Anita Park.

In 2024, Hernandez became the ninth jockey in history and the first since Calvin Borel in 2009 to win both the Kentucky Oaks and the Kentucky Derby in the same year. He won the Oaks aboard Thorpedo Anna then won the Derby the following day on Mystik Dan. Both horses were trained by Ken McPeek.

In an interview, Hernandez Jr. told The Blood-Horse "as a young kid, I'd always ride my bicycle around and tell my mom and dad that I'm going to win the Kentucky Derby".

== Year-end charts ==
Chart (2004–present)	Peak position
National Earnings List for Jockeys 2004	45
National Earnings List for Jockeys 2005	95
National Earnings List for Jockeys 2009	53
National Earnings List for Jockeys 2010	94
National Earnings List for Jockeys 2012	20
National Earnings List for Jockeys 2013	37
National Earnings List for Jockeys 2014	51
National Earnings List for Jockeys 2015	32
