= 2012 Breeders' Cup =

Thoroughbred horse racing event

The 2012 Breeders' Cup World Championships was the 29th edition of the premier event of the North American thoroughbred horse racing year, which took place November 2 and 3 at Santa Anita Park in Arcadia, California. The winners were bred in the United States except where indicated. The Breeders' Cup is generally regarded as the end of the North American racing season, although a few Grade I events take place in later November and December. The 2012 Breeders' Cup results were highly influential in the Eclipse Award divisional championship voting.

== Breeders' Cup Challenge series ==
The Breeders' Cup Challenge provides winners of the designated races with an automatic "Win and You're In" Berth in the Breeders' Cup. Races are chosen by the Breeders' Cup organization and included key prep races in the various Breeders' Cup divisions from around the world.

For 2012, the series consisted of 73 races in 10 countries, 52 of which were Grade / Group One events. Forty-five horses entered in the 2012 Breeders' Cup races qualified via the challenge series, including seven of the winners. These were:

- Fort Larned, who qualified for the Classic by winning the Whitney
- Royal Delta, who won both the Delaware Handicap and Beldame to qualify for the Ladies' Classic
- Little Mike, who qualified for the Turf by winning the Arlington Million
- Wise Dan, who won both the Woodbine Mile and Shadwell Turf Mile to quality for the Breeders' Cup Mile
- Groupie Doll, who qualified for the Filly & Mare Sprint by winning the Thoroughbred Club of America Stakes
- Shanghai Bobby, who earned his berth in the Juvenile by winning both the Hopeful and Champagne
- Calidoscopio, who qualified for the Marathon by winning the Clasico Belgrano

== Results ==
The highlight of the 2012 event was generally considered to be Wise Dan's victory in the Mile, completed in an "eye-popping" 1:31.78, a new track record. Although European horses were expected to be his biggest challengers, the 2011 Kentucky Derby winner Animal Kingdom finished second despite not having raced since February. "It really hasn't hit me yet", said Wise Dan's trainer Charles Lopresti. "It's an incredible accomplishment, but it's really just the horse. He's done things in the morning that you just don't believe, and you work all your life to have a horse like this."

Game On Dude came into the Classic as the favorite after a brilliant campaign that included wins in the Hollywood Gold Cup and Awesome Again Stakes. A win would likely have earned him Horse of the Year honors but he was sluggish and finished seventh. Longshot Fort Larned won in a front running performance, just holding off Mucho Macho Man at the wire.

Rosie Napravnik became just the second female jockey to win a Breeders' Cup race after guiding Shanghai Bobby to a win in the Breeders' Cup Juvenile. After the early leader tired, Shanghai Bobby inherited the lead, then lost his concentration and slowed down. He's Had Enough drew even before Shanghai Bobby responded to urging from Napravnik to prevail by a head.

After capturing the Marathon, Calidoscopio became both the oldest horse to ever win a Breeders' Cup race and the first one trained in South America.

The biggest controversy of the 2012 Breeders' Cup related to the use of the anti-bleeding medication Furosemide (Lasix), commonly used in North America but not permitted elsewhere. To move towards international standards, the Breeders' Cup decided to eliminate the use of Lasix in the Juvenile races, with the intention of extending the ban to other races in subsequent years. However, there was considerable push back from a majority of American owners, trainers and bettors, who feared the form of American horses would be disrupted by the withdrawal of the drug. The raceday ban on Lasix would eventually be removed for the 2014 event.

In the 2012 Eclipse Award voting, nine of the eleven flat racing categories were awarded to horses who won at the Breeders' Cup. Wise Dan won three Eclipse Awards (Horse of the Year, Champion Turf Male and Champion Older Male), becoming the first horse since John Henry in 1981 to do so. The other winners were Shanghai Bobby (Champion 2-year-old Male), Beholder (Champion 2-year-old Female), Royal Delta (Champion Older Female), Zagora (Champion Turf Female), Trinniberg (Champion Male Sprinter) and Groupie Doll (Champion Female Sprinter).

=== Friday ===
Race name	Sponsor	Distance/Surface	Restrictions	Purse	Winner (Bred)
Juvenile Sprint		3/4 mile (1.2 km)	2-year-olds	$500,000	Hightail
Marathon		1 3/4 miles (2.8 km)	3 yrs+	$500,000	Calidoscopio (ARG)
Juvenile Fillies Turf		1 mile	2-year-old fillies	$1 million	Flotilla (FRA)
Juvenile Fillies	Grey Goose	1 1/16 miles (1.7 km)	2-year-old fillies	$2 million	Beholder
Filly & Mare Turf		1 1/4 miles (2.0 km)	Fillies & mares	$2 million	Zagora (FRA)
Ladies' Classic		1 1/8 miles (1.8 km)	3 yrs+ fillies & mares	$2 million	Royal Delta

=== Saturday ===
The Breeders' Cup races were part of a 12 race program with post time at 10:05 am PST for the first race. The post time of the first Breeders' Cup race was 11:51 am PST. The attendance was 55,123.

Race Name	Sponsor	Distance/Surface	Restrictions	Purse	Winner (Bred)
Juvenile Turf		1 mile (Turf)	2-year-old colts & geldings	$1 million	George Vancouver
Filly & Mare Sprint		7/8 mile (1.4 km)	3 yrs+ fillies & mares	$1 million	Groupie Doll
Dirt Mile		1 mile (one turn)	3 yrs+	$1 million	Tapizar
Turf Sprint		About 6 1/2 miles (10.5 km) (Turf)	3 yrs+	$1 million	Mizdirection
Juvenile Dirt	Grey Goose	1 1/16 miles (1.7 km)	2-year-old colts & geldings	$2 million	Shanghai Bobby
Turf		1 1/2 miles (2.4 km) (Turf)	3 yrs+	$3 million	Little Mike
Dirt Sprint	Xpressbet	3/4 mile (1.2 km)	3 yrs+	$1,500,000	Trinniberg
Turf Mile		1 mile (Turf)	3 yrs+	$2 million	Wise Dan
Classic		1 1/4 miles (2.0 km)	3 yrs+	$5 million	Fort Larned
