= Thorpedo Anna =

American racehorse

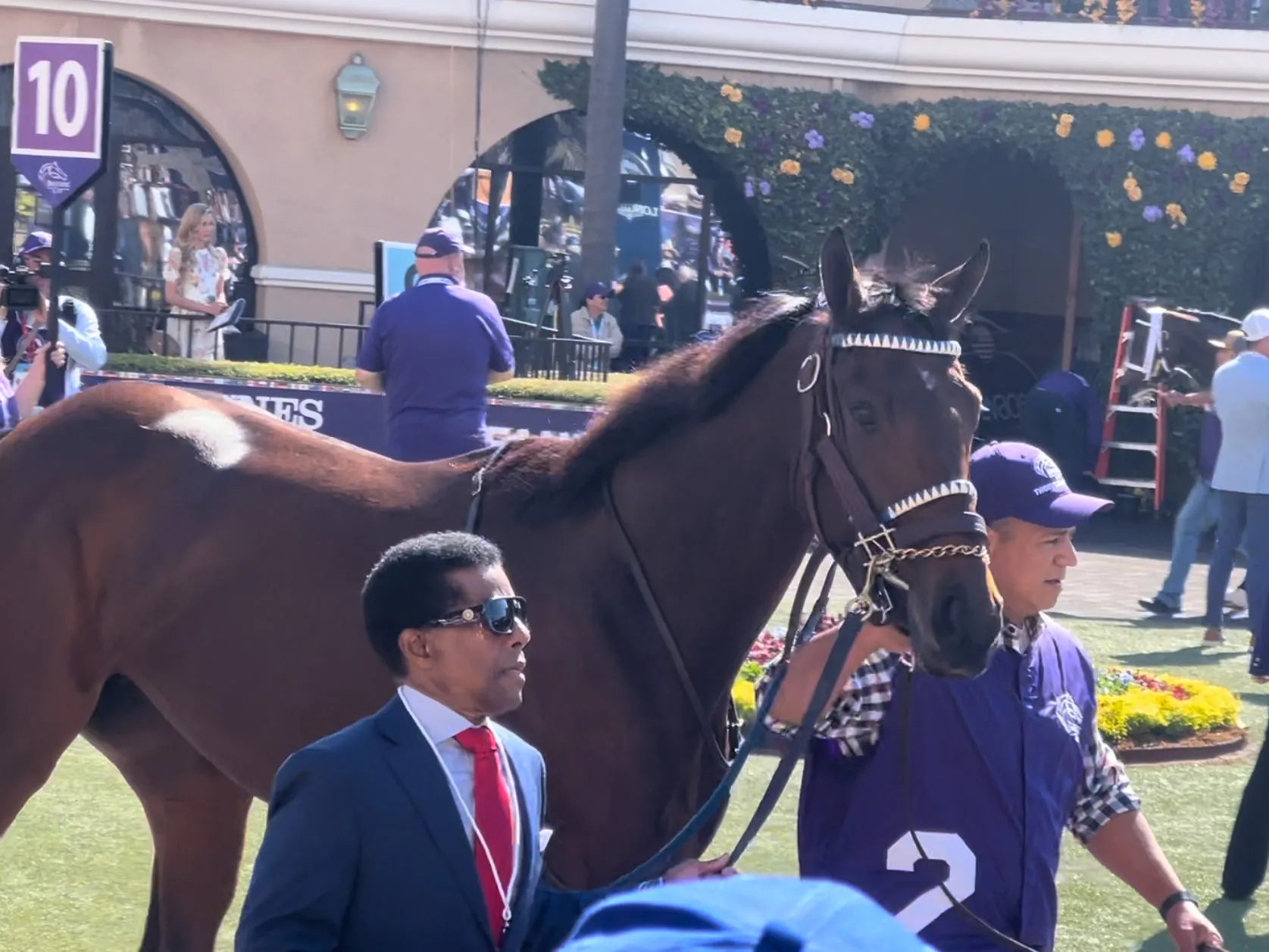
- Thorpedo Anna before the Breeders Cup Distaff
- Sire: Fast Anna
- Grandsire: Medaglia d'Oro
- Dam: Sataves
- Damsire: Uncle Mo
- Sex: Mare
- Foaled: January 28, 2021 (age 5)
- Country: United States
- Colour: Dark Bay
- Breeder: Judy Hicks
- Owner: 1. Brookdale Racing, Inc. (Nader Al A'Ali), Mark Edwards, Judy Hicks, and Magdalena Racing (Sherri McPeek) (– August 2025); 2. Hill 'N' Dale Equine Holdings, Inc., Magdalena Racing, Mark Edwards, Judy Hicks (August 2025 –)
- Trainer: Kenneth G. McPeek
- Record: 16: 12 - 2 - 0
- Earnings: US$5,440,913

Major wins
- Kentucky Oaks (2024); Fantasy Stakes (2024); Acorn Stakes (2024); Coaching Club American Oaks (2024); Cotillion Stakes (2024); Breeders' Cup Distaff (2024); Azeri Stakes (2025); Apple Blossom Handicap (2025); Fleur de Lis Stakes (2025); Personal Ensign Stakes (2025)

Awards
- American Horse of the Year (2024); American Champion Three-Year-Old Filly (2024); American Champion Older Dirt Female Horse (2025)
- Last updated on January 23, 2026

Thorpedo Anna (foaled January 28, 2021) is an American Thoroughbred racehorse who in 2024 won five Grade I races: the Kentucky Oaks, Acorn Stakes, Coaching Club American Oaks, Cotillion Handicap and Breeders' Cup Distaff. As a result of her accomplishments, she became just the second three-year-old filly in history (after Rachel Alexandra in 2009) to be named American Horse of the Year.

== Background ==
Thorpedo Anna is a dark bay mare who was bred by Judy Hicks in Kentucky. Thorpedo Anna is out of the unraced Uncle Mo mare Sataves, by the Medaglia d'Oro son Fast Anna. She comes from the same mare family that produced Eskendereya.

She was named after a local Louisville swimmer.

With a win the following day in the 150th Kentucky Derby with Mystik Dan, Kenneth McPeek became the first trainer since 1952 to win the Derby and the Kentucky Oaks in the same year. Jockey Brian Hernandez Jr. was aboard both horses for their respective wins.

In December 2024, Thorpedo Anna's sequestrum was successfully removed through the jaw procedure at the Rood & Riddle Equine Hospital.

In August 2025, it was announced ahead of Thorpedo Anna's next expected start in the Personal Ensign Stakes that Hill 'n' Dale at Xalapa had acquired a half interest in the horse, purchasing the stake from Brookdale Racing owner Nader Al A'Ali. As part of the transaction, former NFL running back Marshawn Lynch took a minority interest in the horse.

The 2025 Personal Ensign was the final win of Thorpedo Anna's career. Her last race was a fourth-place finish in the Spinster Stakes at Keeneland in early October, with jockey Flavien Prat substituting for injured rider Brian Hernandez Jr.

== Retirement ==
A few days after the Spinster, trainer Ken McPeek told FanDuel TV that Thorpedo Anna would undergo a thorough examination at Rood & Riddle Equine Hospital in Lexington. He said that he would wait for the opinion of examining veterinarian Dr. Larry Bramlage, but the notion was that the Spinster "was probably her last race." One week later in an official press release, McPeek announced that Thorpedo Anna had some "very mild bone bruising," and while she could have returned to training in 90 days, the decision was made to retire her. She will become a broodmare at Hill 'n' Dale at Xalapa, with a 20% share auctioned off prior to the Breeders' Cup.

== Statistics ==
Date	Distance	Race	Grade	Track	Odds	Field	Finish	Winning Time	Winning (Losing) Margin	Jockey	Ref
Oct 26, 2023	7 furlongs	Maiden Special Weight		Keeneland	4.01	12	1	1:24.60	8 1/2 lengths	Brian Hernandez Jr.	
Nov 10, 2023	1 mile	Allowance		Churchill Downs	0.40*	6	1	1:35.68	9 lengths	Brian Hernandez Jr.	
Nov 25, 2023	1 1/16 miles	Golden Rod Stakes	II	Churchill Downs	0.99*	8	2	1:45.01	(5 1/4 lengths)	Brian Hernandez Jr.	
Mar 30, 2024	1 1/16 miles	Fantasy Stakes	II	Oaklawn Park	2.70	10	1	1:44.24	4 lengths	Brian Hernandez Jr.	
May 3, 2024	1 1/8 miles	Kentucky Oaks	I	Churchill Downs	4.49	14	1	1:50.83	4 3/4 lengths	Brian Hernandez Jr.	
Jun 7, 2024	1 1/8 miles	Acorn Stakes	I	Saratoga	0.75*	8	1	1:49.02	5 1/2 lengths	Brian Hernandez Jr.	
Jul 20, 2024	1 1/8 miles	Coaching Club American Oaks	I	Saratoga	0.25*	4	1	1:50.95	4 1/2 lengths	Brian Hernandez Jr.	
Aug 24, 2024	1 1/4 miles	Travers Stakes	I	Saratoga	3.40	8	2	2:01.79	(head)	Brian Hernandez Jr.	
Sep 21, 2024	1 1/16 miles	Cotillion Stakes	I	Parx Racing	0.10*	8	1	1:45.45	neck	Brian Hernandez Jr.	
Nov 2, 2024	1 1/8 miles	Breeders' Cup Distaff	I	Del Mar	0.40*	10	1	1:49.10	2 1/2 lengths	Brian Hernandez Jr.	
Mar 8, 2025	1 1/16 miles	Azeri Stakes	II	Oaklawn Park	0.10*	5	1	1:44.02	3 1/2 lengths	Brian Hernandez Jr.	
Apr 12, 2025	1 1/16 miles	Apple Blossom Handicap	I	Oaklawn Park	0.20*	6	1	1:44.27	4 1/4 lengths	Brian Hernandez Jr.	
May 2, 2025	1 1/16 miles	La Troienne Stakes	I	Churchill Downs	0.39*	7	7	1:42.91	(8 1/2 lengths)	Brian Hernandez Jr.	
Jun 28, 2025	1 1/8 miles	Fleur de Lis Stakes	II	Churchill Downs	0.35*	5	1	1:48.52	3 lengths	Brian Hernandez Jr.	
Aug 23, 2025	1 1/8 miles	Personal Ensign Stakes	I	Saratoga	0.75*	7	1	1:49.18	nose	Brian Hernandez Jr.	
Oct 5, 2025	1 1/8 miles	Spinster Stakes	I	Keeneland	0.50*	5	4	1:49.77	(8 1/2 lengths)	Flavien Prat	

Notes:
An (*) asterisk after the odds means Thorpedo Anna was the post-time favourite.

== Pedigree ==
Pedigree of Thorpedo Anna, filly, January 28, 2021
Sire Fast Anna (2011)	Medaglia d'Oro (1999)	El Prado (IRE) (1989)	Sadler's Wells (1981)
Sire Fast Anna (2011)	Medaglia d'Oro (1999)	El Prado (IRE) (1989)	Lady Capulet (1974)
Sire Fast Anna (2011)	Medaglia d'Oro (1999)	Cappucino Bay (1989)	Bailjumper (1974)
Sire Fast Anna (2011)	Medaglia d'Oro (1999)	Cappucino Bay (1989)	Dubbed In (1973)
Sire Fast Anna (2011)	Dreaming of Anna (2004)	Rahy (1985)	Blushing Groom (FR)(1974)
Sire Fast Anna (2011)	Dreaming of Anna (2004)	Rahy (1985)	Glorious Song (CAN) (1976)
Sire Fast Anna (2011)	Dreaming of Anna (2004)	Justenuffheart (1995)	Broad Brush (1983)
Sire Fast Anna (2011)	Dreaming of Anna (2004)	Justenuffheart (1995)	Kitten's First (1991)
Dam Sataves (2015)	Uncle Mo (2008)	Indian Charlie (1995)	In Excess (IRE) (1987)
Dam Sataves (2015)	Uncle Mo (2008)	Indian Charlie (1995)	Soviet Sojourn (1989)
Dam Sataves (2015)	Uncle Mo (2008)	Playa Maya (2000)	Arch (1995)
Dam Sataves (2015)	Uncle Mo (2008)	Playa Maya (2000)	Dixie Slippers (1995)
Dam Sataves (2015)	Pacific Sky (2004)	Stormy Atlantic (1994)	Storm Cat (1983)
Dam Sataves (2015)	Pacific Sky (2004)	Stormy Atlantic (1994)	Hail Atlantis (1987)
Dam Sataves (2015)	Pacific Sky (2004)	Aldebaran Light (1996)	Seattle Slew (1974)
Dam Sataves (2015)	Pacific Sky (2004)	Aldebaran Light (1996)	Altair (1991)
