= Fort Larned (horse) =

American-bred Thoroughbred racehorse

- Sire: E Dubai
- Grandsire: Mr Prospector
- Dam: Arlucea
- Damsire: Broad Brush
- Sex: Stallion
- Foaled: 3 April 2008
- Country: United States
- Colour: Bay
- Breeder: Janis R. Whitham
- Owner: Janis R. Whitham
- Trainer: Ian Wilkes
- Record: 24: 10-2-1
- Earnings: $4,471,322

Major wins
- Skip Away Stakes (2012); Challenger Stakes (2012); Cornhusker Handicap (2012); Whitney Handicap (2012); Stephen Foster Handicap (2013); Homecoming Classic Stakes (2013); Breeders' Cup wins: Breeders' Cup Classic (2012)

Fort Larned (foaled April 14, 2008) is an American Thoroughbred racehorse best known for winning the 2012 Breeders' Cup Classic.

== Background ==
Fort Larned is a bay horse with a small white star. He was bred in Kentucky by Janis Whitham, under whose colors he also raced. In 1988, Whitham and her late husband purchased the Argentinian mare Bayakoa and campaigned her in the United States, winning the Breeders' Cup Distaff in both 1989 and 1990. Twice named the American Champion Older Female Horse, Bayakoa was later inducted into the Hall of Fame. Bayakoa produced four foals for Whitham, including the mare Arlucea. In 2007, Arlucea was bred to E Dubai, a horse who won both the Dwyer Stakes and the Suburban Handicap for his owners Godolphin Racing. Apart from Fort Larned, his most successful runner has been the Breeders' Cup Turf Sprint winner Desert Code. Whitham, a native of Kansas, named the resultant colt after Fort Larned National Historic Site, located near Larned, Kansas.

Fort Larned was trained by Ian Wilkes, who had been a long-time assistant trainer for Hall of Famer Carl Nafzger, who won the Kentucky Derby with both Unbridled and Street Sense.

== Racing career ==
Fort Larned raced only once as a two-year-old, finishing fourth in a maiden special weight race at Churchill Downs on November 27, 2010.

At age three, Fort Larned ran nine times, winning three of them. His first win came on January 8, 2011, at Gulfstream Park, after which he lost his next four starts. Wilkes decided to try the horse on the turf and Fort Larned responded by winning an allowance race on September 10 at Kentucky Downs. After two more losses on the turf, Fort Larned made his last start of the year at Churchill Downs on November 27 in an allowance race that had been switched from turf to the dirt course due to rain. He won by seven lengths, "turning a proverbial corner" on his way to becoming a top-ranked older horse.

=== 2012: four-year-old season ===
Fort Larned began his 2012 season in Florida with a loss in a handicap at Tampa Bay Downs followed by a win in the Challenger Stakes on March 3. He then recorded his first important success at Gulfstream Park on March 31, winning the Grade III Skip Away Stakes by two and a half lengths over Alma d'Oro while setting a track record of 1:53.92 for 1 3/16 miles. Wilkes stated that the horse had made great improvement and it was suggested that he was well-suited by being allowed to "run free".

At Churchill Downs in May he finished second in the Alysheba Stakes behind Successful Dan, with Mucho Macho Man in third. At the same course a month later he was moved into Grade I class and finished unplaced behind Ron the Greek in the Stephen Foster Handicap after being forced wide in the straight.

In his next race, Fort Larned was ridden for the first time by Brian Hernandez, Jr. At Prairie Meadows on June 30, he led from the start to record a three length success over Successful Dan and Awesome Gem in the Cornhusker Handicap. A first Grade I success followed in August in the Whitney Handicap at Saratoga Race Course. Racing in blinkers for the first time, he took the lead a quarter mile from the finish and won from Ron the Greek and Flat Out. "He's getting better all the time," said Wilkes a few weeks after the race. "Mentally, he has a swagger about him. It's like he’s gone from a boy to a man. He has a presence about him now, a confidence."

Fort Larned's improving form saw him start the 3-1 favorite for the Jockey Club Gold Cup at Belmont Park in late September. He moved up to challenge the leaders approaching the straight, then faded in the closing stages to finish third behind Flat Out and Stay Thirsty. "My horse ran good; we'll be fine, we'll go to the Breeders' Cup," said Wilkes. "I wouldn't want to trade places. Blame got beat here before he beat Zenyatta (in the 2010 Breeders' Cup Classic). It doesn't pay to win this race to win the Breeders' Cup. You have to look at the bright side."

Fort Larned was sent to Santa Anita Park in November to contest the Breeders' Cup Classic, staying in the same barn that had housed his grand-dam Bayakoa. He started at odds of 9–1 in a twelve-runner field with Game On Dude being made the 6-5 favorite. Hernandez sent the colt into the lead soon after the start and he was never headed. In the stretch he faced a strong challenge from Mucho Macho Man but stayed on to prevail by half a length, with a gap of six and a half lengths back to Flat Out in third.

"I never thought the horse was that good," said Whitham's son Clay, "because he was so slow developing. He was just a plain bay horse and nothing more. He wasn’t flashy at all. He finally grew up at Churchill Downs last November in the slop. When he won the Skip Away at Gulfstream this winter and set a track record, I finally thought, 'Hey, he’s got some talent.' But I sure wasn’t counting on winning this race."

Fort Larned was a finalist in the Eclipse Award voting for American Horse of the Year and Champion Older Male Horse, but lost both to Wise Dan, a turf specialist. In 2015, the Older Male Horse award became restricted to horses that run on the dirt.

=== 2013: five-year-old season ===
Fort Larned's first start since winning the Breeders' Cup came on March 9, 2013, at Gulfstream Park. He started favorite for the Gulfstream Park Handicap but lost his chance two strides after the start when he stumbled badly and unseated Hernandez. He injured his left front hoof but Wilkes felt lucky the injury was not worse. "The horse fell on his head," he said. "He's lucky he didn't really hurt himself. He could have ripped his whole heel off or he could have broken his leg. The way he fell, his whole head hit the ground."

A month later he was made 1/2 favorite for the Oaklawn Handicap but ran poorly to finish fifth behind Cyber Secret, leading Wilkes to suggest that the horse had been unsuited by the fast track.

After a break of two months, Fort Larned returned to contest the Stephen Foster Handicap. The horse led from the start and drew clear of his five opponents to win by six lengths from Golden Ticket and Ron the Greek in what was described as a "stunning display". The winning time of 1:47.45 was the second fastest in the history of the race, and just 1/5th of a second off the track record. "He ran unbelievable," said winning trainer Ian Wilkes. "It was gratifying to get the horse back and to prove that he's as good as I thought he was and show he wasn't a one-year wonder."

On August 3 Fort Larned was made favorite for his second Whitney Handicap on August 3. Carrying top weight of 122 pounds he finished fifth of the eight runners behind Cross Traffic. Wilkes described his horse's performance as " a dull effort" but added, "We'll regroup. We'll be back."

Fort Larned was scheduled to make his next start in the Woodward Stakes but was scratched because he was not in top form. Eight weeks after his poor run in the Whitney, Fort Larned reappeared at Churchill Downs for the first running of the Homecoming Classic Stakes, which Wilkes had selected in preference to the Jockey Club Gold Cup. Hernandez sent the horse into the lead from the start and he was never headed, winning by one and a half lengths from Windswept in a time of 1:48.58.

Fort Larned made his final start in the 2013 Breeders' Cup Classic, where he entered an early speed duel with Game On Dude and Moreno. The other two horses finished well back but Fort Larned held on to finish fourth behind Mucho Macho Man, the horse he had defeated in 2012. "It is emotional because it’s his last race," said Wilkes. "He laid his body down today. My hat's off to Mucho Macho Man. He made a great comeback. I knew my horse would bring his 'A' game and he did. He definitely didn't disgrace himself. He put the two speed horses away and they aren't slouches."

== Retirement ==
Fort Larned retired to stud at Adena Springs Farm. As a horse with no trace of Northern Dancer or Seattle Slew in his own pedigree, he is expected to be a popular "outcross" for mares from these lines. His first foals will be of racing age in 2017.

== Pedigree ==
Pedigree of Fort Larned (USA), bay, 2008
Sire E Dubai (USA) 1998	Mr Prospector; 1970	Raise A Native	Native Dancer
Sire E Dubai (USA) 1998	Mr Prospector; 1970	Raise A Native	Raise You
Sire E Dubai (USA) 1998	Mr Prospector; 1970	Gold Digger	Nashua
Sire E Dubai (USA) 1998	Mr Prospector; 1970	Gold Digger	Sequence
Sire E Dubai (USA) 1998	Words of War; 1989	Lord At War (ARG)	General (FR)
Sire E Dubai (USA) 1998	Words of War; 1989	Lord At War (ARG)	Luna de Miel
Sire E Dubai (USA) 1998	Words of War; 1989	Right Word	Verbatim
Sire E Dubai (USA) 1998	Words of War; 1989	Right Word	Oratorio
Dam Arlucea (USA) 1997	Broad Brush; 1983	Ack Ack	Battle Joined
Dam Arlucea (USA) 1997	Broad Brush; 1983	Ack Ack	Fast Turn
Dam Arlucea (USA) 1997	Broad Brush; 1983	Hay Patcher	Hoist The Flag
Dam Arlucea (USA) 1997	Broad Brush; 1983	Hay Patcher	Turn to Talent
Dam Arlucea (USA) 1997	Bayakoa (ARG); 1984	Consultants Bid	Bold Bidder
Dam Arlucea (USA) 1997	Bayakoa (ARG); 1984	Consultants Bid	Fleet Judy
Dam Arlucea (USA) 1997	Bayakoa (ARG); 1984	Arlucea (ARG)	Good Manners
Dam Arlucea (USA) 1997	Bayakoa (ARG); 1984	Arlucea (ARG)	Izarra (Family: 9-g)
