= Flat Out (horse) =

American Thoroughbred racehorse

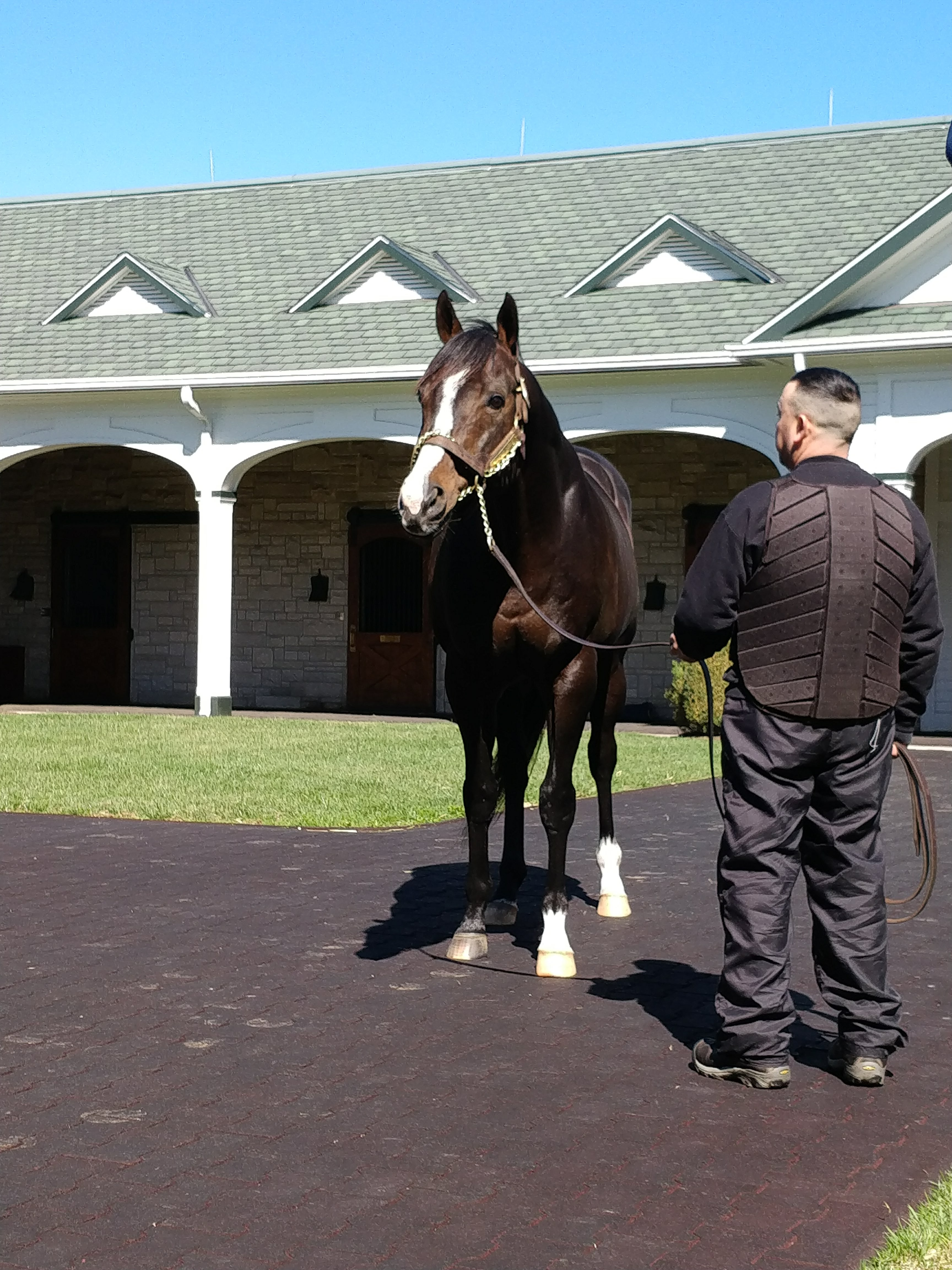
- Flat Out in 2018
- Sire: Flatter
- Grandsire: A.P. Indy
- Dam: Cresta Lil
- Damsire: Cresta Rider
- Sex: Stallion
- Foaled: 21 March 2006
- Country: United States
- Colour: Bay
- Breeder: Nikolaus Bock
- Owner: Oxbow Racing; Preston Stables
- Trainer: Morris Nicks; Charles L. "Scooter" Dickey; Bill Mott
- Record: 29-9-5-5
- Earnings: $3,645,383

Major wins
- Suburban Handicap (2011, 2013); Jockey Club Gold Cup (2011, 2012); Westchester Stakes (2013); Cigar Mile Handicap (2013)

Honours
- Flat Out Stakes at Belmont Park (2016– )
- Last updated on 20 December 2023

Flat Out (foaled 21 March 2006) is a retired American Thoroughbred racehorse and prospective breeding stallion. Bred in Florida, he won nine of his twenty-nine races in a track career which lasted from November 2008 until November 2013. He produced many of his best performances at Belmont Park, where he won the Jockey Club Gold Cup in 2011 and 2012, the Suburban Handicap in 2011 and 2013 and the Westchester Stakes in 2013. His only major win at another track came on his final racecourse appearance when he defeated a strong field in the Cigar Mile Handicap at Aqueduct Racetrack.

== Background ==
Flat Out is a bay horse with a white blaze bred in Florida by Nikolaus Bock. He is by far the most successful racehorse sired by Flatter, a son of A.P. Indy, who won four minor races from six starts in 2002 and 2003. Flat Out was one of several winners produced by the broodmare Cresta Lil, who as a descendant of Rosayya, was a relative of the Melbourne Cup winner Americain.

As a foal, Flat Out was put up for auction at the Ocala Breeders' mixed sale and was sold for $11,000. In July 2007, the yearling was consigned to the Fasig-Tipton Sale where he was bought for $85,000 by representatives of Oxbow Racing. Flat Out was sent into training with Morris Nicks.

== Racing career ==
=== 2008–2010: early career ===
Flat Out began his racing career at Churchill Downs on November 8, 2008, when he finished sixth in a maiden race over six and a half furlongs. In the following month he contested a similar event at Fair Grounds Race Course in New Orleans and recorded his first success finishing strongly to win by a length and a quarter having been outpaced in the early running. He was ridden in both of the races by Jamie Theriot. At the end of the year, Flat Out was moved to the stable of Charles L. "Scooter" Dickey.

Flat Out's three-year-old season consisted of three races at Oaklawn Park at Oaklawn Park Race Track in Hot Springs, Arkansas in all of which he was ridden by Julio Garcia. On January 19 he was stepped up in class and distance for the second running of the one mile Smarty Jones Stakes and won by three and a half length after taking the lead on the final turn. Four weeks later he moved up to Grade III level and finished fourth in the Southwest Stakes after failing to recover fully from a poor start. In the Grade II Arkansas Derby in April he raced behind the leaders for most of the way but made no impression in the straight, finishing sixth behind Papa Clem, with the future Belmont Stakes winner Summer Bird in third.

After a break of more than nineteen months, Flat Out returned in an allowance race at Fair Grounds on December 5, 2010. In the intervening months he had entered the ownership of Art Preston's Preston Stables, although Dickey continued as his trainer. Ridden by Corey Lanerie he was only fifth on the final turn but finished well to win by a length.

=== 2011: five-year-old season ===
Flat Out was off the course for six month after his short-lived comeback after suffering from "quarter cracks". He did not race in 2011 until May 30 when he finished second behind Awesome Gem, from whom he was receiving three pounds, in the Grade III Lone Star Handicap. In the following month he was moved up to Grade I class for the first time when he contested the Stephen Foster Handicap at Churchill Downs and finished sixth of the eleven runners behind Pool Play.

Alex Solis took over the ride on Flat Out when the horse started the outsider in a field of six for the Grade II Suburban Handicap over nine furlongs at Belmont Park on July 2. Before the race, Solis had told Dickey that the horse was particularly well-suited by Belmont, saying that "he really enjoys this track, the long turns and sand. He loves it." Despite being forced to challenge on the wide outside on the final turn he took the lead entering the straight and drew away from his opponents to win by three and a half lengths. For the rest of the season, Flat Out was campaigned exclusively in Grade I class, beginning with the Whitney Handicap at Saratoga in August in which he finished second to the six-year-old Tizway. A month later he was second again when beaten by the four-year-old filly Havre de Grace in the Woodward Stakes at the same course.

On October 1 Flat Out started favorite for the Grade I Jockey Club Gold Cup at Belmont Park against a field which included the Travers Stakes winner Stay Thirsty and the 2010 Belmont Stakes winner Drosselmeyer. Solis tracked the leaders before moving Flat Out into the lead a quarter mile from the finish, and drew away in the straight to win by two and quarter lengths from Drosselmeyer, with Stay Thirsty in third. Commenting on his first Grade I success in a training career which had begun in 1963, Scooter Dickey said "you wouldn't believe how big this is... It's tremendous. It's hard to fathom, but I like it." On November 5 Flat Out started favorite for the Breeders' Cup Classic at Churchill Downs against a field which included Havre de Grace, So You Think, Uncle Mo, Game On Dude, Ruler on Ice and Drosselmeyer. He raced towards the rear of the field before making progress in the straight but never reached the leaders and finished fifth behind Drosselmeyer, beaten a total of three lengths. On his final appearance of the year, Flat Out started favorite for the Clark Handicap at Churchill, but finished third to Wise Dan, to whom he was conceding three pounds.

=== 2012: six-year-old season ===
Flat Out began his six-year-old season at Gulfstream Park in Florida, where he failed to show his best form, finishing last of twelve in the Grade III Fort Lauderdale Stakes in January and fifth behind Hymn Book in the Grade I Donn Handicap a month later.

Flat Out was then moved to the stable of Bill Mott. After a break of almost five months, the horse returned in July when he contested the Grade II Monmouth Cup. Ridden by Rosie Napravnik he started poorly but finished well to finish second to Rule. On August 4 at Saratoga he again ran in the Whitney and finished third to Fort Larned and Ron the Greek after being forced to race on the wide outside on the final turn.

On September 29 Flat Out was ridden by Joel Rosario as he attempted to repeat his 2011 success in the Jockey Club Gold Cup. He started third favorite against a field which included Fort Larned, Ron the Greek, Hymn Book, Ruler on Ice and Stay Thirsty. Rosario restrained the horse in fifth place before making his challenge on the outside in the straight. Making relentless progress he caught the long-time leader Stay Thirsty in the last stride to win by a head, with a gap of five and a half lengths back to Fort Larned in third. Mott praised the horse's "huge" performance, while Art Preston said "I think he's got what Tesio called 'morale.' He's tough-minded". He became the eleventh horse to win the race for a second time, following such notable performers as Nashua, Kelso, Skip Away and Curlin. Flat Out's final race of the season was the Breeders' Cup Classic at Santa Anita Park on November 3, when he started third favorite in a field which included Game On Dude, Mucho Macho Man, and Fort Larned. After racing towards the rear of the field, Flat Out moved into third place early in the straight but was never a threat to the leaders and finished third, beaten half a length and six and a half lengths by Fort Larned and Mucho Macho Man.

=== 2013: seven-year-old season ===
As in 2012, Flat Out began his season at Gulfstream, finishing third to Graydar in the Donn Handicap under top weight of 121 pounds. After running fifth to Graydar in the New Orleans Handicap, the horse was dropped in class for the Grade III Westchester Stakes over one mile at Belmont Park on April 27. Ridden by Junior Alvarado he produced his customary strong late run to catch Cross Traffic in the final strides and win by a head in a time of 1:32.99. Motts assistant Leana Wiliford said that Flat Out "does have an affinity for this racetrack, and he showed it today". A month later, over the same course and distance, he finished third to Sahara Sky and Cross Traffic in the Grade I Metropolitan Handicap. On July 6 Flat Out started favorite against four opponents as he attempted to repeat his 2011 success in the Suburban Handicap. He settled in second place behind Percussion before taking the lead on the final turn and drew away to win comfortably by two and a half lengths and a nose from Last Gunfighter and Fast Falcon. The win was Flat Out's fifth from six starts at Belmont. At Saratoga in August Flat Out started second favorite behind Paynter in the Woodward Stakes. He raced erratically, veering right and then left in the straight before being beaten a head into second place by Alpha, with the pair finishing almost seven lengths clear of the other three runners.

On September 28 Flat Out attempted to become the first horse since Kelso to win the Jockey Club Gold Cup for a third time. He was made the 2.5/1 favorite at the head of a field which included Alpha, Ron the Greek and Cross Traffic as well as the leading three-year-old colts Orb and Palace Malice, winners of the Kentucky Derby and Belmont Stakes respectively. Flat Out stumbled exiting the starting gate and after racing in fourth for much of the race he finished third behind Ron the Greek and Palace Malice. Flat Out's third attempt at the Breeders' Cup Classic proved to be his least successful as he was never in serious contention and finished eighth of the eleven runners behind Mucho Macho Man. On his final racecourse appearance, Flat Out was brought back in distance to contest the Grade I Cigar Mile Handicap at Aqueduct Racetrack on November 30 in which he was opposed by the leading sprinter Groupie Doll, the Haskell winner Verrazano and the Breeders' Cup Dirt Mile winner Goldencents. Alvarado settled the horse behind the leaders before moving up to challenge on the outside on the final turn. Flat Out overtook the leader Private Zone inside the final furlong and won by one and a half lengths with Verrazano third and Groupie Doll in fourth place. After Flat Out's win, Mott said: "This horse, I can't say enough about him. He's just been a real tough, durable horse, a horse that I've always felt may be as good at a flat mile as he is at 10 furlongs."

On December 7 it was announced that Flat Out would be retired from racing to become a breeding stallion in 2014. Art Preston described him as "the most interesting horse I've ever owned... No matter how he finished, he always had a kick at the end. He may not have caught them, but he'd always be running."

== Assessment ==
In the 2011 edition of the World Thoroughbred Racehorse Rankings Flat Out was rated the 80th best racehorse in the world and the 16th best racehorse in the United States. A year later he was ranked 74th in the world and 21st in the United States.

== Pedigree ==
Pedigree of Flat Out (USA), bay horse, 2006
Sire Flatter (USA) 1999	A.P. Indy (USA); 1989	Seattle Slew	Bold Reasoning
Sire Flatter (USA) 1999	A.P. Indy (USA); 1989	Seattle Slew	My Charmer
Sire Flatter (USA) 1999	A.P. Indy (USA); 1989	Weekend Surprise	Secretariat
Sire Flatter (USA) 1999	A.P. Indy (USA); 1989	Weekend Surprise	Lassie Dear
Sire Flatter (USA) 1999	Praise (USA); 1994	Mr. Prospector	Raise a Native
Sire Flatter (USA) 1999	Praise (USA); 1994	Mr. Prospector	Gold Digger
Sire Flatter (USA) 1999	Praise (USA); 1994	Wild Applause	Northern Dancer
Sire Flatter (USA) 1999	Praise (USA); 1994	Wild Applause	Glowing Tribute
Dam Cresta Lil (USA) 1986	Cresta Rider (USA); 1978	Northern Dancer	Nearctic
Dam Cresta Lil (USA) 1986	Cresta Rider (USA); 1978	Northern Dancer	Natalma
Dam Cresta Lil (USA) 1986	Cresta Rider (USA); 1978	Thoroly Blue	Blue Prince
Dam Cresta Lil (USA) 1986	Cresta Rider (USA); 1978	Thoroly Blue	Ambwithor
Dam Cresta Lil (USA) 1986	Rugosa (USA); 1967	Double Jay	Balladier
Dam Cresta Lil (USA) 1986	Rugosa (USA); 1967	Double Jay	Broomshot
Dam Cresta Lil (USA) 1986	Rugosa (USA); 1967	Rose	Sailor
Dam Cresta Lil (USA) 1986	Rugosa (USA); 1967	Rose	Rosayya (family: 1-n)
