= Tizway =

Thoroughbred racehorse (2005–2024)

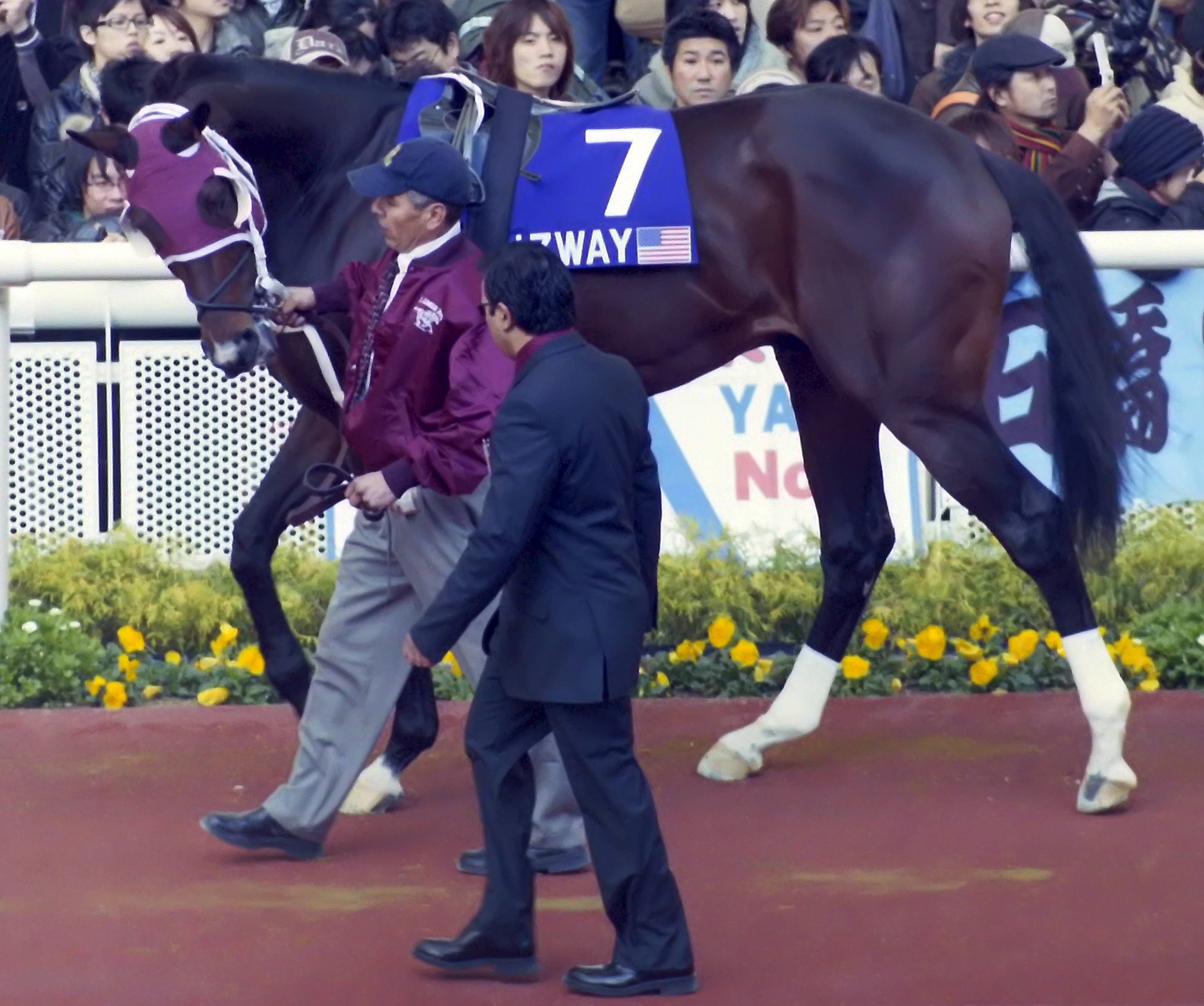
- 2009 Japan Cup Dirt
- Sire: Tiznow
- Grandsire: Cee's Tizzy
- Dam: Bethany
- Damsire: Dayjur
- Sex: Stallion
- Foaled: February 17, 2005
- Died: March 2, 2024 (aged 19)
- Country: United States
- Colour: Dark Bay or Brown
- Breeder: Whisper Hill Farm
- Owner: William L. Clifton Jr.
- Trainer: H. James Bond
- Record: 20: 7-1-5
- Earnings: $1,359,274

Major wins
- Kelso Handicap (2010); Metropolitan Handicap (2011); Whitney Handicap (2011)

Tizway (February 17, 2005 – March 2, 2024) was an American Thoroughbred racehorse who won the 2011 Whitney Stakes and Metropolitan Handicap.

== Racing career ==
=== Early career ===
Tizway's debut came in a 2-year-old maiden special weight at Aqueduct Racecourse. He came in 6th place and did not run again that year.

As a three-year-old, Tizway did not run in any stakes races. His first 4 races he lost. Out of them his best finish was a third. But on the 5th try Tizway won his first race. He never raced again as a three-year-old.

=== 2009: Four-Year-Old Season ===
After 10 months of rest, Tizway came in 2nd in his return before winning his 2nd race, an allowance. He ran in the Whitney for the first time. This was also the first time Tizway ran in a stakes race. He ended up in 4th. He also was 3rd in the Jockey Club Gold Cup. In his last race as a 4-year-old, Tizway was entered in the Japan Cup Dirt, where he finished 12th behind Espoir City.

=== 2010: Five-Year-Old season ===
Tizway started his 5-year-old campaign on April 23, 2010, with a win in an allowance race at Aqueduct, then finished third in the Metropolitan Handicap on May 31. Unfortunately, he then suffered a small fractured wingbone that Dr. Alan Nixon successfully treated. He did not race again until October 3 in the Kelso Handicap, in which he earned his first graded stakes victory. Jockey Rajiv Maragh said, "He’s always been running against some of the best older horses all over and to finally win like this was very good for him. I definitely wanted to get my horse involved because he seems to run better that way, and when I got to the middle of the turn I felt like still had a lot of horse left. Once I called on him in the stretch he just kicked on and finished up powerfully to the wire." He ended the season by finishing fifth in the Breeders Cup Dirt Mile.

=== 2011: Six-Year-Old Season ===
Tizway brought the best in himself in his final season. He started the season with third-place finishes in the Gulfstream Park Handicap on March 12 and Charles Town Classic on April 16. He then stepped up to Grade I company in the Metropolitan Handicap on May 30. Tracking a fast pace for the first 6 furlongs, he took a commanding lead coming into the stretch and won convincingly by 2 3/4 lengths. The final time of 1:32.90 was just three-fifths of a second off the track record, and less than one-tenth off the stakes record. "He tries every time," said trainer H. James Bond. "He couldn't stand up on that stuff at Charles Town and still ran a game third and just missed second. Like I say, I'm just fortunate enough to have him in my barn."

On August 6, Tizway faced multiple Grade 1 winners in the Whitney Handicap, at a distance (1 1/8 miles) in which he had only 1 win in 8 starts. At the beginning of the race, Tizway bolted out of the gate and went to the lead, but he then settled behind Friend or Foe and Morning Line. When they hit the far turn, Tizway took command and easily held off Flat Out to win by three lengths. The decisive victory marked Tizway as the interim leader of the 2011 older horse division.

Unfortunately, Tizway developed a ligament injury while training for the Breeders' Cup Classic and was subsequently retired.

=== End of career statistics ===
At the end of his career, Tizway had an overall career record of 20–7–1–5 and total earnings of $1,359,274. He was an Eclipse Award finalist for 2011 champion older horse, finishing third behind Acclamation with 52 votes.

== Stud record ==
Tizway was retired to stud at Spendthrift Farm in 2012. He stood his first season for a fee of $15,000. His first foals reached racing age in 2015. His first winner, on August 8, was named Tizzarunner. He finished 2015 as the #21 ranked First Crop Sire, with leading earner Tiz Imaginary ($114,089).

As of July 2016, Tizway was a top 10 ranked second crop sire, whose notable offspring included stakes winner Bear'sway.

In June 2017, Spendthrift Farm sold Tizway to stand at stud in South Korea, along with fellow former Spendthrift sire Archarcharch. As part of the sale deal, both horses would return to the U.S. when their breeding careers were over. From South Korea, he was then sent to stud in Turkey.

Tizway is the damsire of Danon Beluga, who won the Kyodo Tsushin Hai in 2022, as well as his half sister Bond Girl.

== Death ==
Tizway died on March 2, 2024, at Karacabey Stud in western Turkey following a heart attack. He was 19.

== Pedigree ==
Pedigree of Tizway, dark bay or brown horse, 2005
Sire Tiznow 1997	Cees Tizzy; 1987	Relaunch	In Reality
Sire Tiznow 1997	Cees Tizzy; 1987	Relaunch	Foggy Note
Sire Tiznow 1997	Cees Tizzy; 1987	Tizley	Lyphard
Sire Tiznow 1997	Cees Tizzy; 1987	Tizley	Tizna
Sire Tiznow 1997	Cee's Song; 1986	Seattle Song	Seattle Slew
Sire Tiznow 1997	Cee's Song; 1986	Seattle Song	Incantation
Sire Tiznow 1997	Cee's Song; 1986	Lonely Dancer	Nice Dancer
Sire Tiznow 1997	Cee's Song; 1986	Lonely Dancer	Sleep Lonely
Dam Bethany 1994	Dayjur; 1987	Danzig	Northern Dancer
Dam Bethany 1994	Dayjur; 1987	Danzig	Pas de Nom
Dam Bethany 1994	Dayjur; 1987	Gold Beauty	Mr. Prospector
Dam Bethany 1994	Dayjur; 1987	Gold Beauty	Stick to Beauty
Dam Bethany 1994	Willamae; 1980	Tentam	Intentionally
Dam Bethany 1994	Willamae; 1980	Tentam	Tamarett
Dam Bethany 1994	Willamae; 1980	Raciette	Hoist the Flag
Dam Bethany 1994	Willamae; 1980	Raciette	Laurie's Dancer
