= Ian Wilkes =

American horse trainer

Personal information
- Born: May 25, 1965 (age 61) Muswellbrook, New South Wales, Australia
- Occupation: Trainer

Horse racing career
- Sport: Horse racing
- Career wins: 438+ (ongoing)

Major racing wins
- Amsterdam Stakes (2006); Falls City Handicap (2008); Bay Shore Stakes (2009); Fleur de Lis Handicap (2009); Hutcheson Stakes (2009); King's Bishop Stakes (2009); Louisville Distaff Handicap (2009); Matt Winn Stakes (2009); Carter Handicap (2010); Pan American Stakes (2010); Cornhusker Handicap (2012); Breeders' Cup wins: Breeders' Cup Classic (2012)

Significant horses
- Fort Larned, McCraken

Ian R. Wilkes (born May 25, 1965, in Muswellbrook, New South Wales, Australia) is a trainer in American Thoroughbred horse racing. He worked for leading Australian trainer Colin Hayes before taking a job in 1990 with trainer Carl Nafzger in the United States.

Now a resident of Louisville, Kentucky and training on his own, Wilkes earned his first Grade 1 win with Capt. Candyman Can in the 2009 King's Bishop Stakes at Saratoga Race Course.

Brothers with Australian NSW Horse Trainer Wayne Wilkes and uncle of Corinne Wilkes.

His most famous win to date is Fort Larned's win in the 2012 Breeders' Cup Classic run at Santa Anita Park in Arcadia, California.
