= Stay Thirsty =

American-bred Thoroughbred racehorse

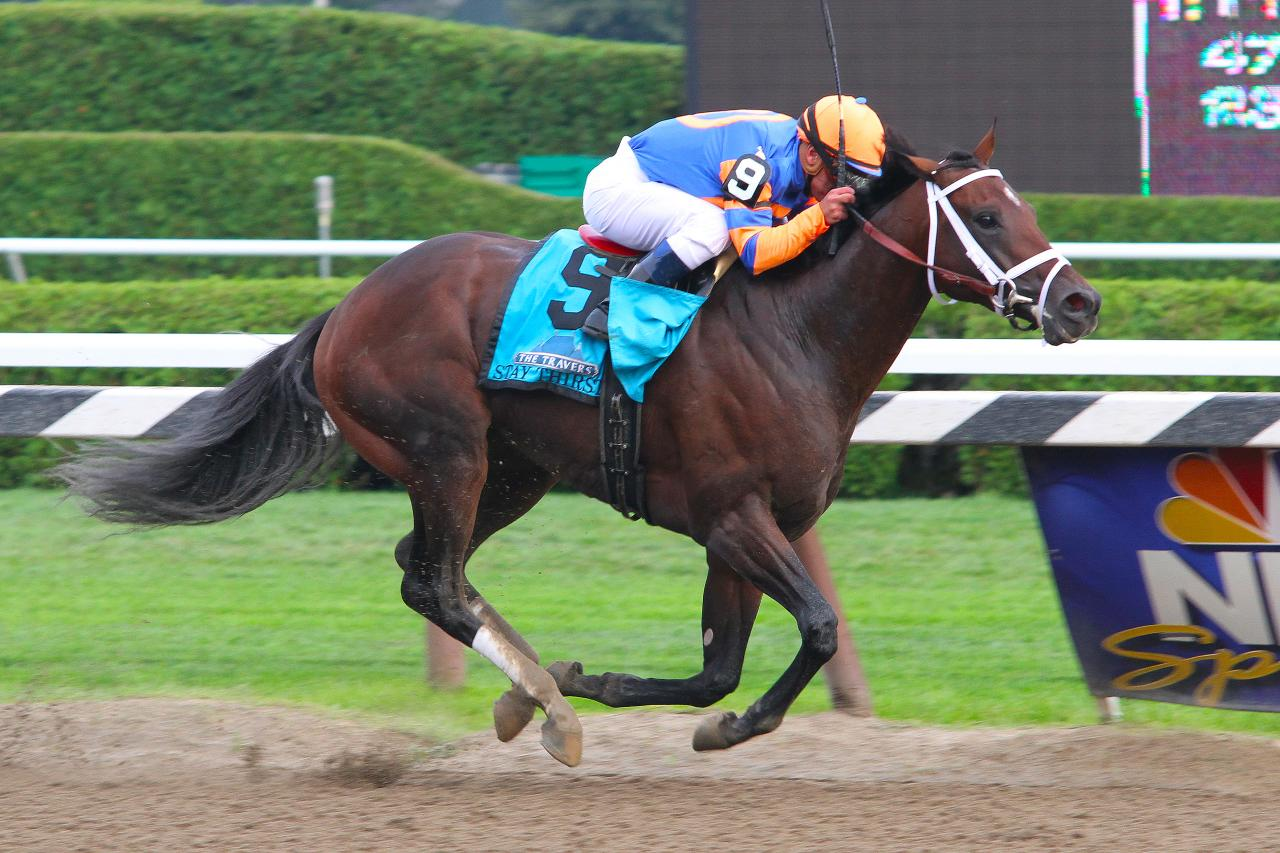
- Stay Thirsty with Javier Castellano up winning the 2011 Travers Stakes.
- Sire: Bernardini
- Grandsire: A. P. Indy
- Dam: Marozia
- Damsire: Storm Bird
- Sex: Stallion
- Foaled: 2008
- Country: United States
- Color: Dark Bay
- Breeder: John D. Gunther & John Darren Gunther
- Owner: Repole Stable
- Trainer: Todd Pletcher
- Record: 14: 4-4-1
- Earnings: US$ 1,503,500

Major wins
- Travers Stakes (2011); Jim Dandy Stakes (2011); Gotham Stakes (2011); Cigar Mile Handicap (2012)
- Last updated on August 27, 2011

Stay Thirsty (foaled on 29 March 2008) is an American Thoroughbred racehorse sired by the leading stallion Bernardini. He was bred in Kentucky by John D. Gunther and John Darren Gunther. His dam, Marozia, was sired by Storm Bird. Stay Thirsty was consigned as lot 1147 by Glenwood Farm to the 2009 Keeneland September yearling auction and was bought for $160,000 by Whitehorse Stables. His trainer, Todd Pletcher, bought him for his owner, Mike Repole, for $500,000 at the 2010 Fasig-Tipton sale of 2-year-olds in training in Florida.

== Racing career ==
=== 2010: two-year-old season ===
Stay Thirsty first raced in a maiden special weight race at Belmont Park on July 15, 2010, finishing second to Sovereign Default. He broke his maiden in an August 14, 2010, race at Saratoga Race Course. Stay Thirsty also placed in the Three Chimneys Hopeful Stakes on September 6, 2010, losing by 3/4 of a length to Boys At Tosconova. He finished fifth in the Grey Goose Breeders' Cup Juvenile at Churchill Downs on November 6, 2010. The race was won by stablemate Uncle Mo.

=== 2011: three-year-old season ===
Stay Thirsty won the Grade 3 Gotham Stakes before coming second to Ruler on Ice in the 2011 Belmont Stakes.

==== 2011 Travers Stakes ====
Like his sire five years earlier, Stay Thirsty has won both the Grade II Jim Dandy Stakes and the 2011 Grade I Travers Stakes. In the Travers, in which he was favored to win, he competed against the top three leaders of the 3-year-old division: Shackleford (winner of the 2011 Preakness Stakes), Ruler on Ice (winner of the 2011 Belmont Stakes), and Coil (winner of the 2011 Haskell Invitational Handicap). He was also the first horse since 1901 to win from the number 9 post.

Stay Thirsty was ridden by Javier Castellano in the race, who also won his second straight Travers. Castellano was the first rider in 30 years to win consecutive Travers Stakes. The last to do so was National Museum of Racing and Hall of Fame jockey Eddie Maple, who won in 1980 and 1981. Castellano also won the 2006 Travers Stakes while riding Bernardini, Stay Thirsty's sire.

Stay Thirsty became the leader of the American 3-year-old colt division after the Travers win. As of that date, he became the most likely 3-year-colt to be considered the best of his class for 2011.

==== Remainder of the season ====
Stay Thirsty was third in the Jockey Club Gold Cup Stakes. He then finished poorly in the 2011 Breeders' Cup Classic, finishing next to last in eleventh place behind the race favorite, Uncle Mo, who finished tenth.

=== 2012: four-year-old season ===
Stay Thirsty returned to racing on May 17 in the Vanlandingham Stakes run at Belmont Park, where he finished second to Trickmeister. In July, Stay Thirsty finished fifth out of seven horses in the Grade II Suburban Handicap, having exited the starting gate poorly. He completed his racing career in November with a win in the Grade I Cigar Mile.

== Stud career ==
He was retired after his four-year-old season and now stands at Ashford Stud, the American arm of the Irish breeding giant Coolmore near Versailles, Kentucky.

In 2017 Stay Thirsty was sold to Lovacre Ranch in Warner Springs, California, where his stud fee is set at $10,000.

=== Notable Progeny ===
Stay Thirsty has sired one Grade 1 winner:

'c = colt, f = filly, g = gelding

Foaled	Name	Sex	Major Wins
2016	Mind Control	c	H. Allen Jerkens Memorial Stakes

== Pedigree ==
Stay Thirsty's sire, Bernardini (Bay, 2003) won the 2006 Preakness Stakes, Travers Stakes, Jim Dandy Stakes, Withers Stakes and the Jockey Club Gold Cup. He was sired by leading sire A.P. Indy, who also produced Mineshaft and Rags to Riches. His dam is Grade I winner Cara Rafaela (Quiet American – Oil Fable), who accrued $884,452 in her racing career. Cara Rafaela won the 1995 Hollywood Starlet Stakes and the Alcibiades Stakes and was Broodmare of the Year in 2006. She has produced nine foals, including Île-de-France and Bold Legacy.

Stay Thirsty's dam, Marozia (Chestnut, 1994), was sired by Storm Bird out of the mare Make Change. She was exported to the United Kingdom in 1995 and raced with limited success until age four, earning £6,220 ($10,367). She returned to the United States from Ireland in 1998 and has produced ten foals. Stay Thirsty was her eighth foal, and she also produced the graded stakes winners Andromeda's Hero and Superfly, by Fusaichi Pegasus. Her dam, Make Change, won the Miss Liberty Stakes and produced eight foals, including the filly Time Changes.

Pedigree of Stay Thirsty, Bay, 2008.
Sire Bernardini B. 2003	A.P. Indy; B. 1989	Seattle Slew 1974	Bold Reasoning 1968
Sire Bernardini B. 2003	A.P. Indy; B. 1989	Seattle Slew 1974	My Charmer 1969
Sire Bernardini B. 2003	A.P. Indy; B. 1989	Weekend Surprise 1980	Secretariat 1970
Sire Bernardini B. 2003	A.P. Indy; B. 1989	Weekend Surprise 1980	Lassie Dear 1974
Sire Bernardini B. 2003	Cara Rafaela; Gray/Roan 1993	Quiet American 1986	Fappiano 1977
Sire Bernardini B. 2003	Cara Rafaela; Gray/Roan 1993	Quiet American 1986	Demure 1977
Sire Bernardini B. 2003	Cara Rafaela; Gray/Roan 1993	Oil Fable 1986	Spectacular Bid 1976
Sire Bernardini B. 2003	Cara Rafaela; Gray/Roan 1993	Oil Fable 1986	Northern Fable 1978
Dam Marozia Ch. 1994	Storm Bird; B. 1978	Northern Dancer 1961	Nearctic 1954
Dam Marozia Ch. 1994	Storm Bird; B. 1978	Northern Dancer 1961	Natalma 1957
Dam Marozia Ch. 1994	Storm Bird; B. 1978	South Ocean 1967	New Providence 1956
Dam Marozia Ch. 1994	Storm Bird; B. 1978	South Ocean 1967	Shining Sun 1962
Dam Marozia Ch. 1994	Make Change; Ch. 1975	Roberto 1969	Hail to Reason 1958
Dam Marozia Ch. 1994	Make Change; Ch. 1975	Roberto 1969	Bramalea 1959
Dam Marozia Ch. 1994	Make Change; Ch. 1975	Equal Change 1972	Arts and Letters 1966
Dam Marozia Ch. 1994	Make Change; Ch. 1975	Equal Change 1972	Fairness 1963

== Racing statistics ==
Date	Age	Distance	Race	Grade	Track	Surface	Odds	Time	Field	Finish	Margin	Jockey	Trainer	Owner	Citation
July 15, 2010	2	5 1/2 Furlongs	Maiden Special Weight	Maiden	Belmont Park	Dirt	0.75	1:03.79	7	2	3/4 Lengths	John Velazquez	Todd Pletcher	Repole Stable	
August 14, 2010	2	6 Furlongs	Maiden Special Weight	Maiden	Saratoga Race Course	Dirt	0.70	1:11.01	9	1	1/2 Lengths	John Velazquez	Todd Pletcher	Repole Stable	
September 6, 2010	2	7 Furlongs	Hopeful Stakes	1	Saratoga Race Course	Dirt	4.90	1:23.27	4	2	3/4 Lengths	John Velazquez	Todd Pletcher	Repole Stable	
November 6, 2010	2	1 1/16 miles or1,700 m	Breeders' Cup Juvenile	1	Churchill Downs	Dirt	13.50	N/A	10	5	N/A	Javier Castellano	Todd Pletcher	Repole Stable	
March 5, 2011	3	1 1/16 miles or1,700 m	Gotham Stakes	3	Aqueduct Racetrack	Dirt	0.90	1:44.78	7	1	3/4 Lengths	Ramon Dominguez	Todd Pletcher	Repole Stable	
April 3, 2011	3	1 1/8 miles or1,800 m	Florida Derby	1	Gulfstream Park	Dirt	8.30	N/A	8	7	N/A	Ramon Dominguez	Todd Pletcher	Repole Stable	
May 7, 2011	3	1 1/4 miles or2,000 m	Kentucky Derby	1	Churchill Downs	Dirt	17.20	N/A	19	12	N/A	Ramon Dominguez	Todd Pletcher	Repole Stable	
June 11, 2011	3	1 1/2 miles or2,400 m	Belmont Stakes	1	Belmont Park	Dirt	16.20	2:30.88	12	2	3/4 Lengths	Javier Castellano	Todd Pletcher	Repole Stable	
July 30, 2011	3	1 1/8 miles or1,800 m	Jim Dandy Stakes	2	Saratoga Race Course	Dirt	2.50	1:48.78	7	1	3/4 Lengths	Javier Castellano	Todd Pletcher	Repole Stable	
August 27, 2011	3	1 1/4 miles or2,000 m	Travers Stakes	1	Saratoga Race Course	Dirt	2.40	2:03.03	10	1	1/4 Lengths	Javier Castellano	Todd Pletcher	Repole Stable	
Oct 1, 2011	3	1 1/4 miles or2,000 m	Jockey Club Gold Cup Stakes	1	Belmont Park	Dirt	1.30	2:03.17	7	3	1 1/4 Lengths	Javier Castellano	Todd Pletcher	Repole Stable	
Nov 5, 2011	3	10 furlongs (1 1/4 miles or2,000 m)	Breeders' Cup Classic	1	Churchill Downs	Dirt	11.80	N/A	12	11	N/A	Javier Castellano	Todd Pletcher	Repole Stable	
