= Awesome Gem =

American-bred Thoroughbred racehorse

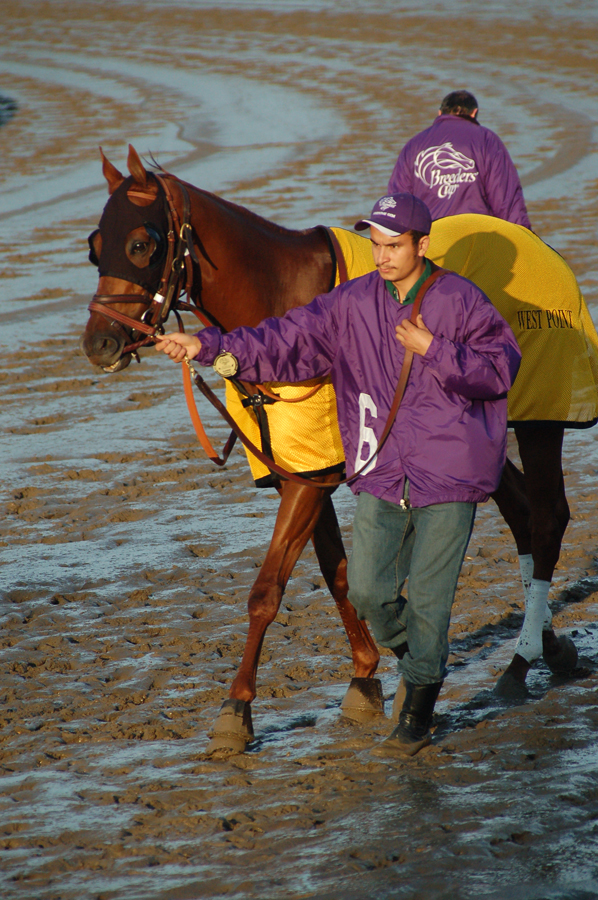
- Awesome Gem at Monmouth Park.
- Sire: Awesome Again
- Grandsire: Deputy Minister
- Dam: Piano
- Damsire: Pentelicus
- Sex: Gelding
- Foaled: 2003
- Country: United States
- Colour: Chestnut
- Breeder: Runnymede Farm, Catesby Clay & Peter Callahan
- Owner: West Point Thoroughbreds
- Trainer: Craig Dollase
- Record: 50: 11-15-5
- Earnings: $2,821,370

Major wins
- San Fernando Stakes (2007); Hawthorne Gold Cup Handicap (2009); Hollywood Gold Cup (2010); Lone Star Park Handicap (2011); Longacres Mile Handicap (2011); Berkeley Handicap (2012)

Awesome Gem (foaled February 6, 2003) is an American Thoroughbred racehorse who won the 2007 San Fernando Stakes, 2009 Hawthorne Gold Cup, and 2010 Hollywood Gold Cup.

== Background ==
This son of Awesome Again was sold by Crupi's New Castle Farm to West Point Thoroughbreds for $150,000 in California at the 2005 Barretts March 2-year-old sale. His partnership includes Paul Blavin, Scott Ross of Scottsdale, AZ, Scott Cadwallader and Patrice Arundel of Vista, CA, and Rob Keen of Encinitas, California.

== Racing career ==
=== 2006: Three-year-old season ===
As a three-year-old, he finished second twice before winning a Maiden Special Weight at Santa Anita's Oak Tree meet on September 29, 2006. He went on to capture an allowance on October 26, 2006, and then ended the year with a second place on the turf in the Grade III 1-mile Sir Beaufort Stakes on December 26, 2006, on the opening day of Santa Anita's 2006–07 winter meet.

=== 2007: Four-year-old season ===
Awesome Gem won his first stakes race at the start of the 2007 season, on January 13, in the 1-1/16-mile Grade II San Fernando Breeders' Cup Stakes on the dirt after bounding down the stretch to snatch the lead from favorite Midnight Lute just before the wire. The chestnut then placed 5th in the 1-1/8-mile Grade II Strub Stakes on the dirt track at Santa Anita on February 3, 2007, and finished last in the eight-horse field for the 1 1/4-mile Grade I Santa Anita Handicap on March 3, 2007.

After a brief rest, Awesome Gem was dropped in class and placed 2nd in an allowance race on Hollywood Park's new synthetic Cushion Track on May 26, 2007. He then returned to the winner's circle on June 23, 2007, in an Allowance Optional Claiming, also at Hollywood Park.

On July 21, 2007, Awesome Gem returned to the stakes scene to place second behind Sun Boat in the 1-1/16-mile Grade II San Diego Handicap on Del Mar's new Polytrack. On August 19, 2007, he finished second in the 1 1/4-mile Pacific Classic Stakes at Del Mar. In the race, Awesome Gem made a furious closing effort down the stretch from almost last to narrowly miss overtaking the leader, Student Council, at the wire. On September 29, Awesome Gem unsuccessfully dueled Tiago down the stretch in the 1-1/8-mile Grade I Goodwood Handicap on Santa Anita's new Cushion Track during the 2007 Oak Tree meet, losing by a nose and again placing second.

Awesome Gem ran as a long shot in the prestigious Grade I 1 1/4-mile Breeders' Cup Classic at Monmouth Park on October 27, 2007. On the sloppy track, he rallied and overtook 2007 Kentucky Derby winner Street Sense to earn third place. The $500,000 third-place prize effectively doubled the gelding's career earnings and made him West Point Thoroughbred's first horse to reach $1 million in earnings.

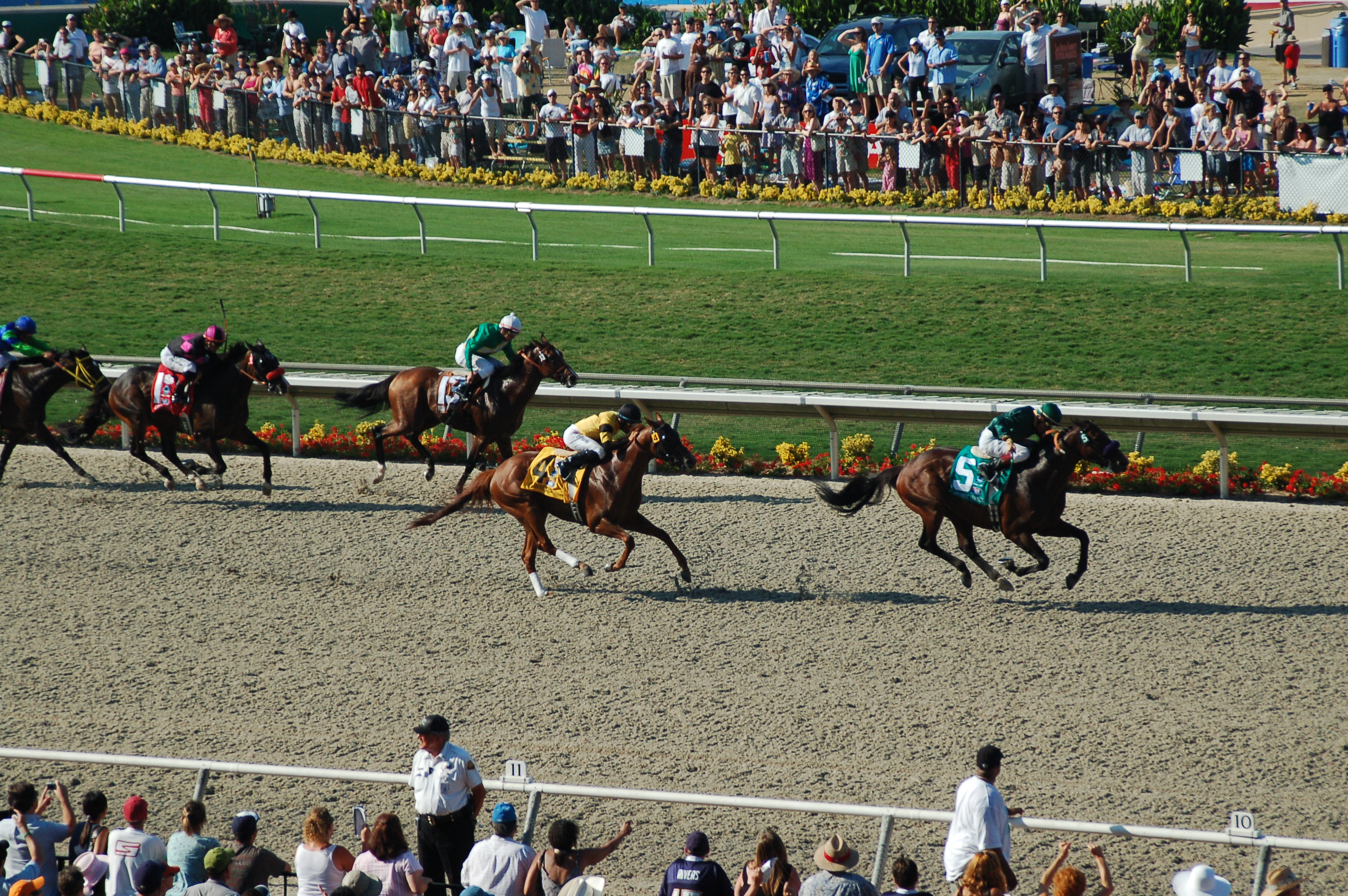
Awesome Gem chases Student Council in the 2007 Pacific Classic.

The chestnut took off the rest of the 2007 season and was sent to an undisclosed farm for rest. While he was on break, trainer Craig Dollase announced that he plans to point Awesome Gem toward the 2008 Dubai World Cup scheduled for March 29.

=== 2008: Five-year-old season ===
Awesome Gem made his first start of the 2008 season in the Grade 2 San Antonio Handicap at Santa Anita, placing third and besting his Pacific Classic rival, Student Council who came fifth.

On March 1, 2008, Awesome Gem placed seventh in the G1 Santa Anita Handicap, lacking his usual powerful drive down the stretch. On October 3, 2009, Awesome Gem won the Grade 2 Hawthorne Gold Cup Handicap at the age of 6. In July 2010, he won his first Grade I victory in the Hollywood Gold Cup against favorite Rail Trip.

=== Later career ===
In May 2011, he took the Lone Star Park Handicap in his first win that year as an eight-year-old. He got past Game On Dude for a one-length victory under Robby Albarado.

On August 22, he also won the Longacres Mile Handicap, beating Washington's favorite, Noosa Beach. On May 28, 2012, he won the Berkeley Handicap when the first over the line, Positive Response, was disqualified. Awesome Gem was favored in this race, his 50th race at the age of 9.

== Retirement ==
In 2017, Awesome Gem was retired to Old Friends in Georgetown, KY.
