= Ron the Greek =

American thoroughbred racehorse

- Breed: Thoroughbred
- Sire: Full Mandate
- Grandsire: A.P. Indy
- Dam: Flambe'
- Damsire: Fortunate Prospect
- Sex: Stallion
- Foaled: May 9, 2007
- Country: USA
- Breeder: Jack T. Hammer
- Owner: King Abdullah bin Abdulaziz Sons
- Trainer: Nicholas Bachalard
- Jockey: J. Lezcano
- Record: 36:14-5-4
- Earnings: $2,763,694

Major wins
- Jockey Club Gold Cup (2013); Stephen Foster Handicap (2012); Santa Anita Handicap (2012)

Ron the Greek (foaled May 9, 2007) is an American Thoroughbred racehorse, winner of the 2013 Jockey Club Gold Cup .

== Career ==
Ron the Greek's first race was on October 11, 2009 at Hoosier Park, which he won.

Ron grabbed his first graded race win on January 23, 2019 at the Lecomte Stakes, a grade 3 race.

Ron picked up some minor wins in 2011, winning both the Queens County Stakes and the Sunny and Mild Stakes in late 2011.

He then captured the biggest win of his career up to the point by winning the Grade 1 2012 Santa Anita Handicap. The following month, he came in second at the 2012 Oaklawn Handicap.

Ron then captured another Grade 1 win, this time at the 2012 Stephen Foster Handicap.

On September 28, 2013, Ron won the Grade 1 2013 Jockey Club Gold Cup.

He then finished off his career by getting wins in January and February of 2015 in Saudi Arabia, winning the Crown Prince Cup and the Custodian of the Two Holy Mosques Cup.

== Pedigree ==
Pedigree of Ron the Greek (USA), 2005
| Sire Full Mandate (USA) 1999 | A.P. Indy (USA); 1989 | Seattle Slew | Bold Reasoning |
| Sire Full Mandate (USA) 1999 | A.P. Indy (USA); 1989 | Seattle Slew | My Charmber |
| Sire Full Mandate (USA) 1999 | A.P. Indy (USA); 1989 | Weekend Surprise | Secretariat |
| Sire Full Mandate (USA) 1999 | A.P. Indy (USA); 1989 | Weekend Surprise | Lassie Dear |
| Sire Full Mandate (USA) 1999 | Clear Mandate (USA); 1992 | Deputy Minister | Vice Regent |
| Sire Full Mandate (USA) 1999 | Clear Mandate (USA); 1992 | Deputy Minister | Mint Copy |
| Sire Full Mandate (USA) 1999 | Clear Mandate (USA); 1992 | Dream Deal | Sharpen Up |
| Sire Full Mandate (USA) 1999 | Clear Mandate (USA); 1992 | Dream Deal | Likely Exchange |
| Dam Flambe' (USA) 1998 | Fortunate Prospect (USA); 1981 | Northern Prospect | Mr. Prospector |
| Dam Flambe' (USA) 1998 | Fortunate Prospect (USA); 1981 | Northern Prospect | Sleek Dancer |
| Dam Flambe' (USA) 1998 | Fortunate Prospect (USA); 1981 | Fortunate Bid | Lucky Debonair |
| Dam Flambe' (USA) 1998 | Fortunate Prospect (USA); 1981 | Fortunate Bid | Biddy Big |
| Dam Flambe' (USA) 1998 | Flambeau (USA); 1992 | Dixieland Band | Northern Dancer |
| Dam Flambe' (USA) 1998 | Flambeau (USA); 1992 | Dixieland Band | Mississippi Mud |
| Dam Flambe' (USA) 1998 | Flambeau (USA); 1992 | Moment's Prayer | For The Moment |
| Dam Flambe' (USA) 1998 | Flambeau (USA); 1992 | Moment's Prayer | Prayer Cap |
