= Game On Dude =

American-bred Thoroughbred racehorse

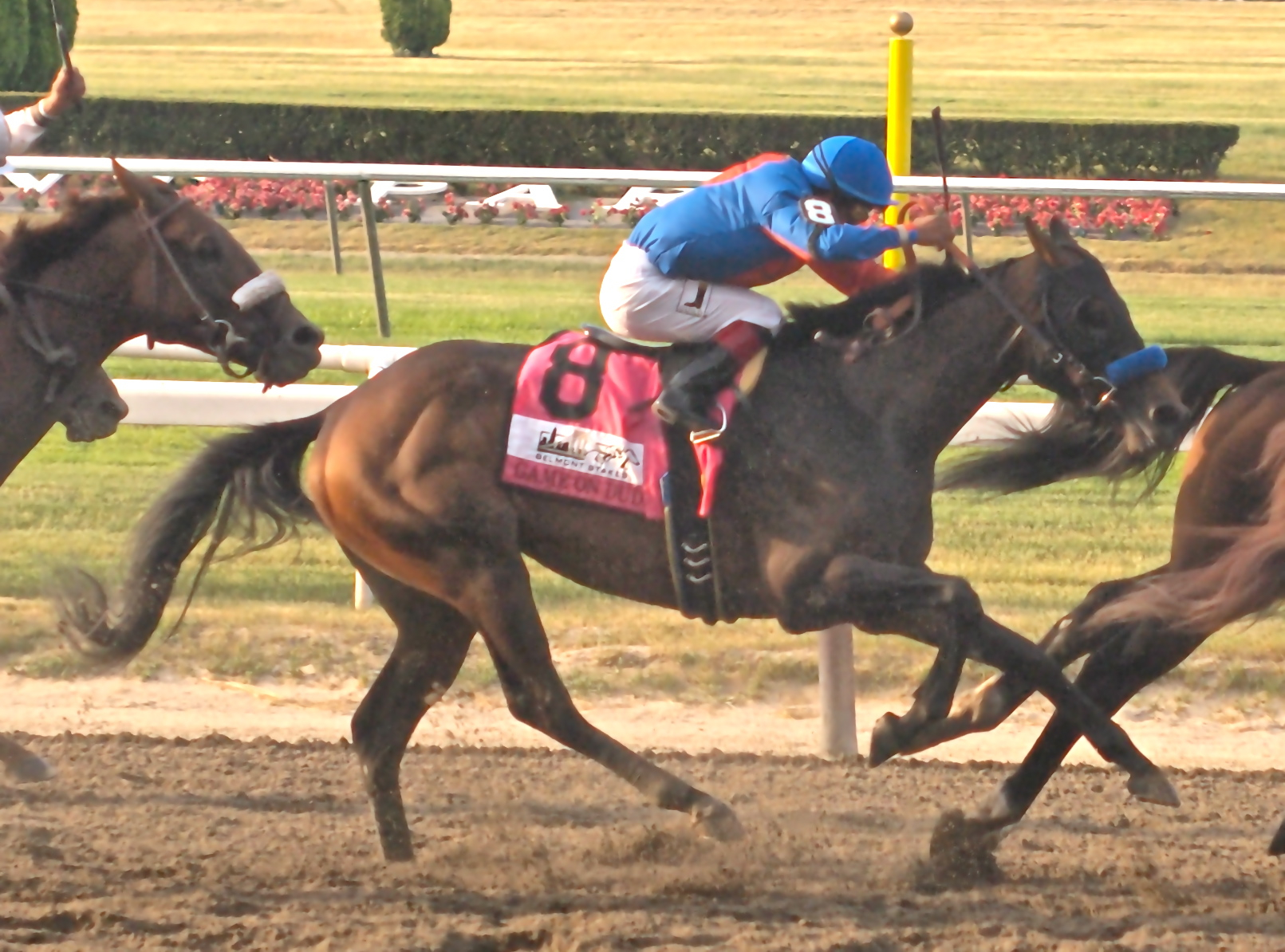
- Game On Dude in 2010 Belmont Stakes
- Sire: Awesome Again
- Grandsire: Deputy Minister
- Dam: Worldly Pleasure
- Damsire: Devil His Due
- Sex: Gelding
- Foaled: April 26, 2007
- Country: United States
- Colour: Dark Bay
- Breeder: Adena Springs
- Owner: Diamond Pride LLC, Lanni Family Trust, Mercedes Stable LLC, Bernie Schiappa
- Trainer: Bob Baffert
- Record: 34: 16-7-1

Major wins
- Lone Star Derby (2010); Santa Anita Handicap (2011, 2013, 2014); Goodwood Stakes (2011, 2012); San Antonio Stakes (2012, 2013); Californian Stakes (2012); Hollywood Gold Cup (2012, 2013); Native Diver Handicap (2012); Charles Town Classic (2013); Pacific Classic Stakes (2013)
- Last updated on September 18, 2014

Game On Dude (foaled April 26, 2007) is a retired American Thoroughbred racehorse gelding. He won fourteen graded stakes races, including eight Grade I stakes. He won the Santa Anita Handicap in 2011, 2013, and 2014; he is the only horse to have won that race three times. He also won the Goodwood Stakes twice (2011, 2012), the 2013 Pacific Classic Stakes, and the Hollywood Gold Cup twice (2012, 2013). He has beaten many of the leading North American racehorses including Awesome Gem, Tizway, Ruler on Ice, Uncle Mo, Stay Thirsty, Mucho Macho Man, and Will Take Charge. He has been rated among the best thirty racehorses in the world in the annual World Thoroughbred Rankings. Upon his retirement, he was compared favorably as one of the greatest racing geldings of all time, along with Kelso, John Henry, and Forego.

== Background ==
Game On Dude is a dark bay gelding with no white markings on his face and pastern-high socks on both hind legs. He was bred by the Adena Springs stud of Paris, Kentucky. He was sired by 1998 Breeders' Cup Classic winner Awesome Again, whose other major winners include Ghostzapper, Oxbow, Wilko, and Paynter. Game On Dude is the second recorded foal of his dam Worldly Pleasure, a mare who won eight of her thirty-one races between 2003 and 2005. As a descendant of the broodmare Adjournment, Worldly Pleasure was a distant relative of the Preakness Stakes winner Master Derby.

In September 2008, as a yearling Game On Dude was sent to Keeneland but did not meet his reserve price of $210,000. He was later sold privately and sent into training with Bob Baffert. He was ridden by several leading jockeys including Rafael Bejarano, Chantal Sutherland, and Mike E. Smith. He often raced with blinkers and a blue shadow roll.

== Racing career ==
=== 2010: three-year-old season ===
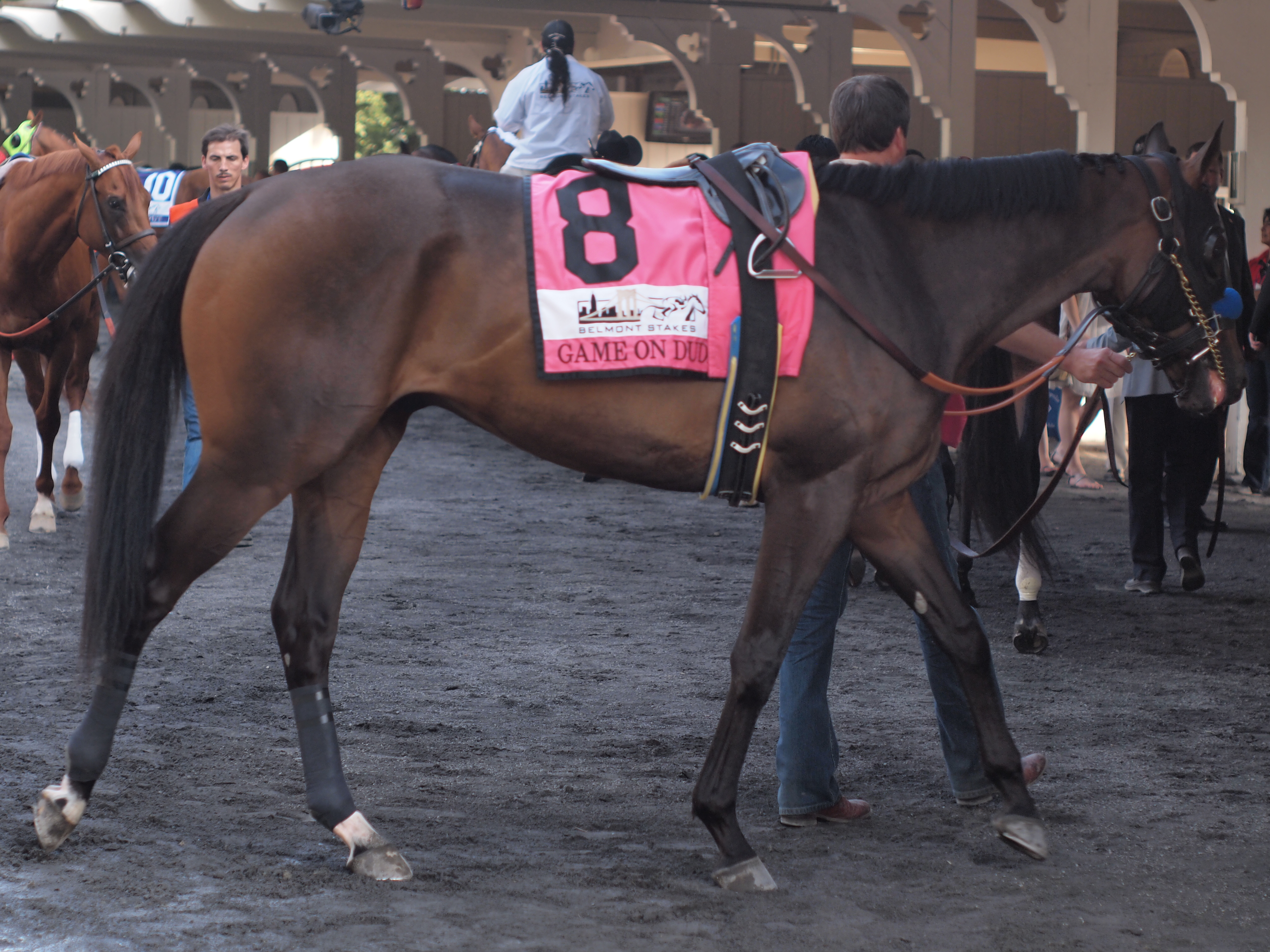
Game On Dude in the paddock prior to the Belmont Stakes

Unraced as a two-year-old, Game On Dude began his racing career at Gulfstream Park in early 2010, winning a maiden race over one mile at his second attempt. He was then moved up in class to contest three of the preparatory races for the Triple Crown series. After finishing unplaced in the Florida Derby and the Cliff's Edge Derby Trial, he ran in the Grade III Lone Star Derby at Lone Star Park on May 8. Ridden by Martin Garcia, he took the lead in the straight and drew clear of his opponents to record his first significant win by four and a half lengths. Garcia was again in the saddle when Game On Dude started a 17/1 outsider for the Belmont Stakes on June 5. He challenged for the lead early in the straight before finishing fourth of the eleven runners, two and a half lengths behind winner Drosselmeyer. Game On Dude did not race again in 2010: according to Baffert, “He did something to a hind ankle, so I had to stop on him."

=== 2011: four-year-old season ===
In 2011, Game On Dude ran eight times and won three races, notably the Santa Anita Handicap and the Goodwood Stakes, both at Santa Anita Park. The Santa Anita Handicap, which provided the gelding with his first Grade I win, was a controversial race. Ridden by Sutherland, he prevailed by a nose from Setsuko but was involved in an incident in which the favorite, Twirling Candy, was badly hampered. The result was confirmed after a lengthy steward's inquiry and was met by boos from the crowd. That year, he also finished second in the Hollywood Gold Cup and the Breeders' Cup Classic.

=== 2012: five-year-old season ===
As a five-year-old, Game On Dude won the San Antonio Stakes, Californian Stakes, Hollywood Gold Cup, Awesome Again Stakes, and Native Diver Handicap. He started as the 5–4 favorite for the Breeders' Cup Classic but finished seventh behind Fort Larned.

=== 2013: six-year-old season ===
Game on Dude began his six-year-old campaign with consecutive victories in the San Antonio Stakes, Santa Anita Handicap, Charles Town Classic, Hollywood Gold Cup, and Pacific Classic. With his 2013 victories in the Santa Anita Handicap, Hollywood Gold Cup, and Pacific Classic, he became the second horse to achieve the "California Triple Crown" in a single year. The only other horse to achieve this feat was Lava Man.

In the Pacific Classic, where he led from the start, his margin of victory was a record 8 1/2 lengths. This was his third try at the Classic. This win marked a seven-race win streak, including a 5-for-5 campaign in 2013.

The final time recorded in the 2013 Pacific Classic was questioned. According to "Trakus Time", a company that does timing at many tracks, Game On Dude's winning time was 1:59.26, not the Del Mar official time listed at 2:00.69. However, upon review, officials at Del Mar upheld the official time, which was the third-fastest time for the race. He earned a 113 Beyer Speed Figure for his effort. Baffert was not concerned: "As long as they don't take the check away, it's good." Entered for a third time in the Breeders' Cup Classic, Game On Dude was the favorite but again failed to hit the board, finishing ninth out of 11 horses in the field.

In order to help Game On Dude's chances with the Eclipse Award, he was entered in the Clark Handicap at Churchill Downs. He was second to Will Take Charge by a head.

=== 2014: seven-year-old season ===
Game On Dude at Old Friends Equine

After a fifth-place finish in the San Antonio Stakes, his first race of the 2014 season, Game On Dude won the Santa Anita Handicap for the third time, beating Will Take Charge, who was second, and Mucho Macho Man, who was fourth. With this win, he became the first-ever three-time winner of the race and broke the stakes record set by Affirmed in 1979. After the gelding's victory, which was achieved in a race record time of 1:58.17, Baffert commented, "I was in awe of the horse watching him come down the stretch. What an amazing animal!" On his next start, Game On Dude started odds-on favorite to repeat his 2013 success in the Charles Town Classic while conceding five pounds to his opponents and was beaten two and a half lengths by the four-year-old Imperative. In the Gold Cup at Santa Anita, he again started odds-on under top weight and finished fourth behind Majestic Harbour.

In the Pacific Classic, Mike Smith opted to ride the unbeaten three-year-old Shared Belief, leaving the ride on Game On Dude to Martin Garcia. Game On Dude took the early lead but was challenged in the early stages by Argentinian outsider Mystery Train. He maintained his advantage into the straight but faded in the closing stages to finish fourth behind Shared Belief, Toast of New York, and Imperative. Baffert said that the run of Mystery Train had effectively ruined his horse's chances: “Longshots are always the biggest danger to a horse like Game on Dude. They always want to go after him. I hate to see that. I think he was gonna win if they hadn't gone after him like that. It's frustrating to train a horse and get him ready for his biggest race and have a horse who has no shot to win take that chance away".

On September 18, 2014, Baffert announced that Game On Dude would be retired. Discussing the recent tendency of opponents to enter horses with early speed to wear him down and his poor performance in the Pacific Classic, Baffert explained, "It's starting to wear on him a little bit to the point where it's not fun for him anymore. We always felt if he couldn't compete at the Grade I level and wasn't enjoying what he was doing, it would be time to retire him." His owner, Bernie Schiappa, announced in early October that Game On Dude would spend his retirement at Old Friends, located in Georgetown, Kentucky.

== Assessment ==
In the 2011 edition of the World Thoroughbred Rankings, Game On Dude was given a rating of 122, making him the twenty-third best racehorse in the world and the fourth-best horse trained in the United States. He improved his mark to 123 in 2012 but in 2013 slipped to twenty-fifth in the world and sixth in the United States.

Upon his retirement, he was viewed as one of the greatest American racing geldings of all time, compared favorably with Kelso, John Henry and Forego.

== Pedigree ==
Pedigree of Game on Dude (USA), dark bay or brown gelding (2007)
| Sire Awesome Again (CAN) 1994 | Deputy Minister (CAN); 1979 | Vice Regent | Northern Dancer |
| Sire Awesome Again (CAN) 1994 | Deputy Minister (CAN); 1979 | Vice Regent | Victoria Regina |
| Sire Awesome Again (CAN) 1994 | Deputy Minister (CAN); 1979 | Mint Copy | Bunty's Flight |
| Sire Awesome Again (CAN) 1994 | Deputy Minister (CAN); 1979 | Mint Copy | Shakney |
| Sire Awesome Again (CAN) 1994 | Primal Force (USA); 1987 | Blushing Groom | Red God |
| Sire Awesome Again (CAN) 1994 | Primal Force (USA); 1987 | Blushing Groom | Runaway Bride |
| Sire Awesome Again (CAN) 1994 | Primal Force (USA); 1987 | Prime Prospect | Mr. Prospector |
| Sire Awesome Again (CAN) 1994 | Primal Force (USA); 1987 | Prime Prospect | Square Generation |
| Dam Worldly Pleasure (USA) 2000 | Devil His Due (USA); 1989 | Devil's Bag | Halo |
| Dam Worldly Pleasure (USA) 2000 | Devil His Due (USA); 1989 | Devil's Bag | Ballade |
| Dam Worldly Pleasure (USA) 2000 | Devil His Due (USA); 1989 | Plenty O'Toole | Raise a Cup |
| Dam Worldly Pleasure (USA) 2000 | Devil His Due (USA); 1989 | Plenty O'Toole | Lil' Puss |
| Dam Worldly Pleasure (USA) 2000 | Fast Pleasure (USA); 1992 | Fast Play | Seattle Slew |
| Dam Worldly Pleasure (USA) 2000 | Fast Pleasure (USA); 1992 | Fast Play | Con Game |
| Dam Worldly Pleasure (USA) 2000 | Fast Pleasure (USA); 1992 | Sis Pleasure Fager | What A Pleasure |
| Dam Worldly Pleasure (USA) 2000 | Fast Pleasure (USA); 1992 | Sis Pleasure Fager | Princess Fager (Family 1-l) |
