= Prince of Birds =

American-bred Thoroughbred racehorse

- Sire: Storm Bird
- Grandsire: Northern Dancer
- Dam: Special Key
- Damsire: Key to the Mint
- Sex: Stallion
- Foaled: 10 March 1985
- Country: United States
- Colour: Chestnut
- Breeder: Joe Miller, Howard L. Bedda & Threefarms
- Owner: Robert Sangster
- Trainer: Vincent O'Brien
- Record: 4: 3-0-0

Major wins
- Tetrarch Stakes (1988); Irish 2,000 Guineas (1988)

Prince of Birds (10 March 1985 – after 2006) was an American-bred, Irish-trained thoroughbred racehorse and sire. In a brief racing career he won three of his four races between June 1987 and June 1988. He won his only race as a two-year-old in 1987, won the Tetrarch Stakes on his three-year-old debut and then recorded his biggest win in the Irish 2,000 Guineas. He finished fifth in the St James's Palace Stakes on his only subsequent start and was retired from racing at the end of the year. He had little success as a breeding stallion.

== Background ==
Prince of Birds was a chestnut horse with a white blaze and three white socks bred in Kentucky by Joe Miller, Howard L. Bedda & Threefarms. As a yearling he was offered for sale at the Keeneland July Select Sale and was bought for $650,000 by the bloodstock agency BBA (Ireland) on behalf of the British businessman Robert Sangster. He was sent to race in Europe and was trained throughout his racing career by Vincent O'Brien at Ballydoyle.

He was from the third crop of foals sired by the Canadian-bred Storm Bird, who was the top-rated two-year-old in Europe in 1980. As a breeding stallion in Kentucky he also sired Summer Squall, Storm Cat, Indian Skimmer, Bluebird and Balanchine. Prince of Bird's dam Special Key was a granddaughter of Glad Rags who won the 1000 Guineas in 1966 and was the female-line ancestor of several major winners including Gorytus, Colonial Affair, Union Rags and Declaration of War.

== Racing career ==
=== 1987: two-year-old season ===
On his first and only start as a two-year-old Prince of Birds won a maiden race over six furlongs at Phoenix Park Racecourse in June,

=== 1988: three-year-old season ===
Prince of Birds began his second season in the Group Three Tetrarch Stakes over seven furlongs at the Curragh on 23 April. Ridden by John Reid started at odds of 4/1 and won by one and a half lengths from the Dermot Weld-trained favourite Careafolie (winner of the Gladness Stakes).

Three weeks after his win in the Tetrarch, Prince of Birds was one of fourteen colts to contest the Irish 2000 Guineas over one mile at the Curragh and with Reid riding the stable's more fancied contender Caerwent, he was partnered by Declan Gillespie. The Minstrel Stakes winner Executive Perk started favourite ahead of the French challenger Dramatis and Caerwent with Prince of Birds next in the betting on 9/1. The best of the four British-trained runners appeared to be Intimidate who had finished runner-up in the Mill Reef Stakes, Gimcrack Stakes and Greenham Stakes. Prince of Birds raced towards the rear of the field and was not in the first ten as the leaders approached the last quarter mile. He began to make rapid progress through the centre but appeared hopelessly boxed-in as Caerwent and Executive Perk disputed the lead inside the final furlong. In the closing stages the favourite weakened abruptly and drifted to the right, opening up a gap through which Gillespie was able to drive his mount. Prince of Birds caught Caerwent on the line and won by a neck from his stablemate with Intimidate taking third ahead of Executive Perk.

Reid resumed the ride when Prince of Birds was sent to England to contest the St James's Palace Stakes at Royal Ascot on 14 June. He started the 7/2 favourite but never looked likely to win and finished fifth of the seven runners behind Persian Heights, Raykour, Caerwent and Blushing John.

== Stud record ==
After his retirement from racing Prince of Birds became a breeding stallion. He stood in Ireland, the United States, Australia and Japan. He sired many minor winners but very few top-class performers. The most successful of his offspring were probably the Australian mare Infinite Grace who won the Tristarc Stakes in 2003 and the Japanese colt Multi Max, the winner of the 1993 Spring Stakes. His last reported foals were born in 2007.

== Pedigree ==
Pedigree of Prince of Birds (USA), chestnut stallion, 1985
| Sire Storm Bird (CAN) 1978 | Northern Dancer (CAN); 1961 | Nearctic | Nearco |
| Sire Storm Bird (CAN) 1978 | Northern Dancer (CAN); 1961 | Nearctic | Lady Angela |
| Sire Storm Bird (CAN) 1978 | Northern Dancer (CAN); 1961 | Natalma | Native Dancer |
| Sire Storm Bird (CAN) 1978 | Northern Dancer (CAN); 1961 | Natalma | Al Mahmoud |
| Sire Storm Bird (CAN) 1978 | South Ocean (CAN); 1967 | New Providence | Bull Page |
| Sire Storm Bird (CAN) 1978 | South Ocean (CAN); 1967 | New Providence | Fair Colleen |
| Sire Storm Bird (CAN) 1978 | South Ocean (CAN); 1967 | Shining Sun | Chop Chop |
| Sire Storm Bird (CAN) 1978 | South Ocean (CAN); 1967 | Shining Sun | Solar Display |
| Dam Special Key (USA) 1975 | Key to the Mint (USA); 1969 | Graustark | Ribot |
| Dam Special Key (USA) 1975 | Key to the Mint (USA); 1969 | Graustark | Flower Bowl |
| Dam Special Key (USA) 1975 | Key to the Mint (USA); 1969 | Key Bridge | Princeuillo |
| Dam Special Key (USA) 1975 | Key to the Mint (USA); 1969 | Key Bridge | Blue Banner |
| Dam Special Key (USA) 1975 | Better Begin (USA); 1970 | Buckpasser | Tom Fool |
| Dam Special Key (USA) 1975 | Better Begin (USA); 1970 | Buckpasser | Busanda |
| Dam Special Key (USA) 1975 | Better Begin (USA); 1970 | Glad Rags | High Hat |
| Dam Special Key (USA) 1975 | Better Begin (USA); 1970 | Glad Rags | Dryad (Family 13-b) |
