= Round Pond (horse) =

American-bred Thoroughbred racehorse

- Sire: Awesome Again
- Grandsire: Deputy Minister
- Dam: Gift of Dance
- Damsire: Trempolino
- Sex: Filly
- Foaled: 2002
- Country: United States
- Colour: Bay
- Breeder: Trudy McCaffery & John Toffan
- Owner: Fox Hill Farms
- Trainer: John Servis; Michael R. Matz (2006)
- Record: 13: 7-2-3
- Earnings: $1,998,700

Major wins
- Acorn Stakes (2005); Fantasy Stakes (2005); Honeybee Stakes (2005); Azeri Breeders' Cup Stakes (2006) Breeders' Cup wins: Breeders' Cup Distaff (2006)
- Last updated on June 9, 2007

Round Pond (foaled May 21, 2002) is a retired American Thoroughbred racehorse. A two-time Eclipse Award finalist, she is best known for winning the 2006 Breeders' Cup Distaff.

== Background ==
Round Pond was bred in Kentucky by Trudy McCaffery & John Toffan. The bay filly is a daughter of 1998 Breeders' Cup Classic winner Awesome Again and the Trempolino mare Gift of Dance. Her damsire, the French-bred Trempolino, is best known for winning the 1987 Prix de l'Arc de Triomphe.

John Servis, best known as the trainer of Kentucky Derby winner Smarty Jones, bought Round Pond for $105,000 as a yearling at the 2003 Keeneland September Yearling Sale, on behalf of Rick Porter. Servis trained the filly during the beginning of her career.

In 2006 Round Pond was trained by Michael R. Matz, who is also known as the trainer of Barbaro and Union Rags, winners of the 2006 Kentucky Derby and 2012 Belmont Stakes, respectively.

Round Pond was owned by Rick Porter during her racing career, racing under his Fox Hill Farm stable name.

== Racing career ==
=== 2005 season ===
Unraced as a juvenile, Round Pond made her racing debut as a sophomore in February 2005 at Oaklawn Park. She finished third, but broke her maiden in her second start two weeks later. She made her stakes debut next in the listed Honeybee Stakes, winning impressively, before winning her first graded stakes afterwards in the Fantasy Stakes. Round Pond captured her first Gr.I when she defeated Smuggler in the 2005 Acorn Stakes. After running second in the Delaware Oaks, it was discovered that Round Pond had developed a bone chip in her knee. Despite given promise by veterinarians that Round Pond could be healed in time for the Gr.I Alabama Stakes, a race that owner Rick Porter desired to win, he decided not to run her as to not risk further injury. Round Pond received surgery for her knee and was sidelined for the rest of the year.

Due to her efforts, Round Pond was nominated for 2005 American Champion Three-Year-Old Filly, but the award was given to Smuggler, the filly she had previously defeated in the Acorn Stakes. Round Pond was fourth place in the voting, with a total of 16 votes.

=== 2006 Season and Breeders' Cup ===
Round Pond resumed racing the following February and made her 2006 debut, an allowance race at Oaklawn Park, a winning one that she followed with another graded win- the Azeri Stakes. After the Azeri Stakes, Round Pond developed foot issues that kept her sidelined until late summer. To prep for the upcoming Breeders' Cup at Churchill Downs, Round Pond ran in the Molly Pitcher Stakes and Beldame Stakes, finishing second and third, respectively.

Round Pond was sent off at outsider odds of 14–1 in the 2006 Breeders' Cup Distaff, the bettors giving most of the attention to Fleet Indian, who was entering the Distaff on an 8-race win streak. Round Pond tracked in fourth for most of the race, along the inside of the field. As the field came to the top of the stretch, Round Pond took the lead and pulled away down the stretch to win by 5 ½ lengths with a final time of 1:50.50. The impressive victory was marred, however, as the favored Fleet Indian was injured and vanned off after the race, never to race again, and 3-1 second choice Pine Island broke down entering the backstretch and was euthanized.

Round Pond was once again nominated for an Eclipse Award for her racing efforts in 2006. Though she once again did not win, Round Pond was runner-up in the voting, with 48 total votes to winner Fleet Indian's 213.

=== 2007 Season and Retirement ===
Now a Breeders' Cup winner, Round Pond returned to racing once again the following year, hoping to defend her title in that year's Distaff. She made her first of only two starts in 2007 in Gulfstream Park's Rampart Stakes, finishing fourth, the worst finish of her career. She improved upon her poor finish in her next start by finishing third in the Apple Blossom Handicap.

Round Pond's racing career unfortunately came to a close in April 2007, when she fractured her knee during training. She retired with a record of 13: 7-2-3 and earnings of $1,998,700.

== Broodmare career ==
Round Pond was offered at the 2007 Fasig-Tipton November Breeding Stock Sale. Darley Stud purchased the mare for $5.75 million, becoming the highest-priced horse at the sale in more than 20 years.

As of 2017, Round Pond has produced four named foals:

- Long River (2010 colt by A.P. Indy)- Winner of the 2017 Al Maktoum Challenge, Round 3 in Dubai, also won Evening Attire Stakes and finished 3rd in the Jockey Club Gold Cup as a four year old (2014).
- Long Water (2011 gelding by Elusive Quality)- Handicap winner and earner of $106,168.
- Fjord (2012 filly by Bernardini)- Unraced
- Tyburn Brook (2013 filly by Bernardini- Unraced
