= Dixie Union (horse) =

American-bred Thoroughbred racehorse

- Sire: Dixieland Band
- Grandsire: Northern Dancer
- Dam: She's Tops
- Damsire: Capote
- Sex: Stallion
- Foaled: 1997
- Country: United States
- Colour: Dark Bay/Brown
- Breeder: Herman Sarkowsky
- Owner: Herman Sarkowsky & Diamond A Racing Corp
- Trainer: Richard E. Mandella
- Record: 12: 7-3-0
- Earnings: US$1,233,190

Major wins
- Norfolk Stakes (1999); Best Pal Stakes (1999); Hollywood Juvenile Championship Stakes (1999); Haskell Invitational Handicap (2000); Malibu Stakes (2000)

Dixie Union (March 7, 1997 – July 14, 2010) was an American Thoroughbred racehorse whose wins included two Grade I stakes . He was also a successful sire whose progeny included Grade 1 winners Hot Dixie Chick, Dixie Chatter, and 2012 Belmont Stakes winner Union Rags.

Dixie Union was bred by Seattle, Washington businessman and former NBA team owner Herman Sarkowsky, who raced him in partnership with Gerald Ford's Diamond A Racing Corp. His sire was Dixieland Band, the 2004 Leading broodmare sire in North America. His dam was She's Tops, the 1992 winner of the Grade II Railbird Stakes who was a daughter of the 1986 American Champion Two-Year-Old Colt, Capote.

Trained by U.S. Racing Hall of Fame inductee Richard Mandella, at age two Dixie Union won three important stakes races in California. At age three, he won the Grade I Haskell Invitational Handicap at Monmouth Park Racetrack in Oceanport, New Jersey, and the Malibu Stakes at Santa Anita Park in Arcadia, California.

Due to a deteriorating neurological condition, Dixie Union was humanely euthanized on July 14, 2010, and was buried in the equine cemetery at Lane's End Farm where he had stood at stud.

== Pedigree ==
Pedigree of Dixie Union
Sire Dixieland Band	Northern Dancer	Nearctic	Nearco
Sire Dixieland Band	Northern Dancer	Nearctic	Lady Angela
Sire Dixieland Band	Northern Dancer	Natalma	Native Dancer
Sire Dixieland Band	Northern Dancer	Natalma	Almahmoud
Sire Dixieland Band	Mississippi Mud	Delta Judge	Traffic Judge
Sire Dixieland Band	Mississippi Mud	Delta Judge	Beautillion
Sire Dixieland Band	Mississippi Mud	Sand Buggy	Warfare
Sire Dixieland Band	Mississippi Mud	Sand Buggy	Egyptian
Dam She's Tops	Capote	Seattle Slew	Bold Reasoning
Dam She's Tops	Capote	Seattle Slew	My Charmer
Dam She's Tops	Capote	Too Bald	Bald Eagle
Dam She's Tops	Capote	Too Bald	Hidden Talent
Dam She's Tops	She's A Talent	Mr. Prospector	Raise a Native
Dam She's Tops	She's A Talent	Mr. Prospector	Gold Digger
Dam She's Tops	She's A Talent	Paintbrush	Bold Hour
Dam She's Tops	She's A Talent	Paintbrush	Change Water
