= Paynter (horse) =

American Thoroughbred racehorse

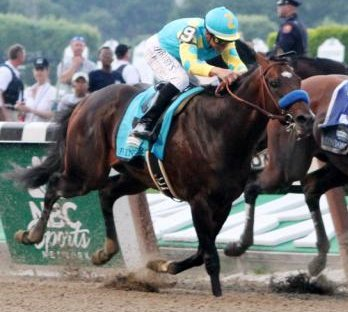
- Paynter at the 2012 Belmont Stakes
- Sire: Awesome Again
- Grandsire: Deputy Minister
- Dam: Tizso
- Damsire: Cees Tizzy
- Sex: Stallion
- Foaled: March 4, 2009
- Died: November 10, 2023
- Country: United States
- Colour: Bay
- Breeder: Diamond A Racing Corp
- Owner: Zayat Stables LLC
- Trainer: Bob Baffert
- Record: 11:4-4-0
- Earnings: $1,101,924

Major wins
- Haskell Invitational (2012)

Awards
- Secretariat Vox Populi Award (2012); National Thoroughbred Racing Association Moment of the Year (2012)

Paynter (March 4, 2009 – November 10, 2023) was an American-bred Thoroughbred racehorse noted for a three-year-old racing season that included a second-place finish in the 2012 Belmont Stakes and a victory in the Haskell Invitational, cut short by a near-fatal case of colitis requiring abdominal surgery, complicated by laminitis. Most experts believed that even if he survived, his racing days were over. His struggle for life, updated via social media by his owners, gained him a large fan base and earned him the National Thoroughbred Racing Association Moment of the Year and Secretariat Vox Populi Award for 2012.

His surgery was successful and treatment for laminitis prevented harm to his feet, he was sent to the Fair Hill Training Center for recovery and rehabilitation. In his four-year-old year, he returned to the track in June 2013, eleven months after his 2012 Haskell victory, winning the first race of his comeback by 4 1/2 lengths, then running in three more graded stakes races, placing second in two of them, demonstrating his ability to compete against top horses. In November 2013, he ran in the Breeders' Cup Classic and following the race was retired to WinStar Farm to stand at stud beginning with the 2014 breeding season.

== Background ==
Paynter is a bay horse with a white star on his forehead, a faint irregular snip on his nose, and a white left front pastern bred by Diamond A Racing Corporation of Kentucky. His sire is 1998 Breeders' Cup Classic winner Awesome Again, and his dam is Tizso, who raced twice and is a full sister to the two-time Breeders' Cup Classic winner Tiznow.

Originally named MC's Dream, Paynter sold for $325,000 at the Keeneland yearling sale. He was purchased by Ahmed Zayat's Zayat Stables, LLC and was started under saddle by horse trainer J.B. McKathan in Florida. After completing basic training, Zayat's adult son, Justin, selected Paynter, along with stablemate Bodemeister, to move on to the racing stable of trainer Bob Baffert. Paynter did not race as a two-year-old.

== Racing career ==
=== 2012: Three-year-old season ===
Paynter won his maiden race on February 18, 2012, at Santa Anita Park. In an unusual move, he was taken directly from his maiden race to the Grade I Santa Anita Derby, where he had a troubled start and ran in sixth place before finishing fourth, 3 3/4 lengths behind the winner. Viewed as not quite ready for the Triple Crown races, Paynter next ran in the Derby Trial, where, on a muddy track, he lost narrowly in the final furlong. In his first three races, he was ridden by Martin Garcia. His second win was in a 1 1/16 mile allowance race on the undercard of the 2012 Preakness Stakes, when he was ridden by Mike Smith, who also rode Bodemeister in the Preakness later that day. Following Bodemeister's second-place finish in both the Kentucky Derby and the Preakness, Paynter was entered into the Belmont with Smith as a jockey.

In the Belmont, Paynter led for most of the race until the final furlong when Smith came off the rail, allowing winner Union Rags to slip through and win by a neck. Paynter had already fended off two challengers during the race, and Smith had switched his whip from his right hand to his left in an attempt to fend off a late challenge from Atigun; Smith considered his decision to be an error that cost him the race.

Paynter's biggest win and first graded stakes win came in his next race, the 1 1/8 mile, $1 million Haskell Invitational at Monmouth Park Racetrack in July 2012. Baffert's assistant trainer, Jim Barnes, represented the stable at the race, as Baffert had cut back his schedule following a heart attack earlier in the year. Paynter went off as the even-money favorite. Ridden for the first time by jockey Rafael Bejarano, he followed the leader through the backstretch, then took the lead at the far turn, beating five other horses to win by 3 3/4 lengths. His winning time was 1:48.87, earning him a Beyer Speed Figure of 108. The victory was also Baffert's third win in a row at the Haskell and sixth Haskell win in his career. Paynter's winnings of $600,000 put him close to a lifetime earnings figure of $1 million, at $952,224, considered impressive for a three-year-old horse who did not race as a two-year-old.

Paynter's next race was scheduled to be the Travers Stakes on August 25. With all three Triple Crown race winners for 2012 already retired from racing (all due to injury), Paynter was considered a contender to become the 3-year-old Horse of the Year if he continued to win races.

==== Illness and surgery ====
On July 29, 2012, two days after his Haskell win, Paynter developed a fever, pneumonia, and diarrhea. He was hospitalized at the nearby Mid-Atlantic Equine Medical Center in New Jersey and then shipped on August 10, 2012, to Belmont Park, where he trained for several days. He was then shipped to Saratoga Race Course, home to the Travers Stakes, to recover further. However, he had no public workouts and missed the Travers. He was scheduled to be flown back to Baffert's home stable in California on August 27, but Paynter again developed a fever and diarrhea. He was sent to the Upstate Equine Medical Center in Schuylerville, New York, where he was diagnosed with colitis, an inflammation of the colon. Paynter's condition deteriorated and was deemed life-threatening. Ahmed and Justin Zayat began to tweet regular updates on his condition to the public. His care was supervised by Dr. Laura Javsicas, an equine internal medicine specialist. Her devotion to Paynter was admired by both Zayat and Baffert, who later said that Javsicas should receive an Eclipse Award. In turn, Paynter, characterized as an "aggressive" horse, was cooperative toward his caregivers and accepted treatment without causing problems.

Paynter developed an infection at a catheter site and blood clots in his veins due to problems with his protein levels. He lost weight, and suffering from fever, colitis, and diarrhea was given plasma and "aggressive" antibiotic treatment.

The medical staff were also worried, because a systemic illness with intestinal inflammation, such as colitis, is a common precursor to laminitis, a painful inflammation of the internal structures of the hoof. The staff had been using cryotherapy on his lower legs as a precaution. Although his blood test results and protein levels began to stabilize, he nevertheless developed laminitis in three of his feet on September 4, ten days after he arrived at the center. The veterinarians treating Paynter put casts on his lower legs to support his feet. Experts believed that even if he survived his racing days were over, and the Zayat family feared that euthanasia would be necessary.

"He's the toughest horse I've ever seen. He has a heart of a champion."

— Bob Baffert

After about three days, he seemed to be feeling better; his blood work became normal and his diarrhea cleared up, but he still had low-grade fevers. Against the odds, his hoof X-rays came back showing no separation of the laminae, and no rotation or sinking of the coffin bone in any of his feet. Although the cryotherapy had not prevented laminitis, it might have kept it from becoming worse. On September 21, the casts were removed from his legs. The laminitis treatment was successful and his feet were returning to normal, raising hopes that he could race again someday.

Paynter developed an increasing fan base as people followed the Zayat family's social media updates, drawing comparisons to the struggle of Barbaro a few years earlier. Both Ahmed and Justin Zayat sent out regular tweets and the hashtag #PowerUpPaynter was used to help organize updates to the public. Paynter received handmade posters from children and hundreds of get well cards.

Because fevers and colitis were still a problem, Javsicas performed an ultrasound and found a problem area in his colon, thus surgery was required. Paynter was very thin by this time, weighing less than 900 pounds, and surgery was considered high risk. On October 2, he was shipped to the University of Pennsylvania School of Veterinary Medicine's New Bolton Center (where Barbaro had also been treated) and saw Dr. Louise Southwood, a veterinary surgeon who specialized in equine intestinal medicine and colitis cases. The following morning, Paynter went into surgery and Southwood removed a 15-inch (380 mm) growth "full of puss [sic] and bacteria" from his intestines. Southwood explained, "We finally got to the bottom of why he was spiking the fever." Paynter came out of the surgery well and Zayat tweeted, "Just think about the resilience of this guy." Baffert commented, "I can't believe this horse is still alive." Nine days later, a press release came out stating that Paynter was "cleared of any lingering symptoms of both [colitis and laminitis]", and expected to fully recover.

==== Rehabilitation and awards ====
Following surgery, Paynter started to regain his weight, putting on 35 pounds in the two weeks between his surgery and being sent to Fair Hill Training Center's Equine Therapy program on October 15 for rehabilitation. Nonetheless, he arrived at Fair Hill weighing only 912 pounds. At Fair Hill, he started with hand-walking and grazing, later being allowed short periods of exercise in a round pen. He had access to treatment in a horse-sized hyperbaric oxygen therapy chamber, an underwater treadmill called an AquaPacer, equine massage therapy, electromagnetic therapy, and the use of a cold saltwater spa. By November 15, he was close to 1,000 pounds and was allowed free daily turnout in a paddock. His normal temperament returned as he began to buck and kick during turnout. He also developed a taste for red peppermint candies, preferring them over green spearmint ones.

On December 26, Paynter was selected as the winner of the 2012 Secretariat Vox Populi Award. Penny Chenery, owner of Secretariat, for whom the award was named, said "Paynter's popularity stems from his ability to battle and exceed expectations, making him the perfect choice as the recipient of this year's Vox Populi Award ... After seeing firsthand the devastating effects of this disease, I am even more convinced that the industry must continue to fight laminitis. The progress we have made to date clearly benefited Paynter—a beautiful colt with a tremendous spirit." In January 2013, Paynter's survival and recovery was voted the "Moment of the Year" by the National Thoroughbred Racing Association (NTRA) in a field of 12 nominees, and the horse's connections were given that honor at the annual Eclipse Awards.

=== 2013: Comeback ===
On December 29, 2012, Paynter was shipped from Fair Hill back to California, where he resumed race training with Baffert. When he left Fair Hill he weighed 1022 pounds and was described as "full of himself." Both Southwood and Javsicas believed that he could recover completely. While numerous horses recovering from colitis and abdominal surgery have been able to return to their previous levels of competition, Paynter's successful recovery from laminitis was the biggest factor in his ability to resume racing. He began jogging on the track on January 5, and had his first official workout on February 26. On June 14 he was entered into a 7-furlong allowance race at Betfair Hollywood Park. Ahmed Zayat said, "He has shown so much courage, so much tenacity. I just want to let the horse do the talking."

"...He is so courageous, a true trooper, a special horse. He loves to do what he does..."

— Ahmed Zayat

Paynter carried 124 pounds, the co-highweight of the eight horses in the race. Bejarano returned as a jockey. It was the horse's first start on a synthetic surface. He started from starting post position two at odds of 2–5. Paynter led from the start, clocked the first quarter mile in :22.68 and the half-mile in :45.67. At six furlongs, he was 2 1/2 lengths in front, running that distance in 1:06.56, and continued to increase his lead over the other horses. He won by 4 1/2 lengths, finishing in 1:21.86, and earning a Beyer Speed Figure of 114, the best of his career. Justin Zayat said, "I thought I was winning the Kentucky Derby", and Baffert stated, "He is just an incredible, phenomenal horse, I can't believe he is back. He's just a great horse... He went from being 99–1 to survive to 1–9 to win ... I got emotional watching. It's an amazing story." Paynter handled the race well and came out in good shape.

Plans were made for Paynter to run additional races before the Breeders' Cup Classic in the fall. His next race was the San Diego Handicap at Del Mar on July 27, 2013. Shortly after he arrived at Del Mar racetrack in early July, Paynter was profiled on TV, showing that his usual temperament was back to normal, as the camera showed him attempting to nip Baffert. Running for the first time on a different synthetic surface, Polytrack, in the grade 2 race, Paynter was the 3–5 favorite, and at 122 pounds carried the most weight. After running close to the pace and taking the lead in the homestretch, he lost by a half-length to a late-running horse, Kettle Corn, at the finish. Jockey Bejarano believed the Polytrack surface was a factor in his loss. "He never seemed comfortable out there, I felt like I had plenty of horse, but he just wasn't liking what he was doing ... he didn't have enough at the end." Nonetheless, purse money for his placing put him over one million dollars in lifetime winnings.

Paynter next went east to run in the Grade I Woodward Stakes at Saratoga on August 31. Five of the horses in the initial seven-horse field, including Paynter, were previous Grade I stakes winners. Paynter drew post position 5 and was the second favorite at 3-1 odds on the morning line. However, following the scratch of a speed horse, the oddsmaker revised his figures to make front-running Paynter the 2-1 favorite. On race day, over a sloppy track, another horse, Mucho Macho Man, scratched and only five horses went to the post. Paynter had a bad start, hitting the left side of the starting gate. Although he ran second for part of the race, he finished last in the field. Justin Zayat said after the race, "[Paynter] never got a hold of the track. We’ll be back another day." Baffert concurred, stating that the horse was "fine", but had been troubled by the poor break and by mud hitting his face.

Paynter's next race was the Grade I Awesome Again Stakes at Santa Anita on September 28. He started from the seven post with his former rider, Martin Garcia up. After running in the middle of the pack and going five horses wide coming into the stretch, he finished second to Mucho Macho Man. His placing was viewed by sportswriters as proof that he could run against top competitors. Baffert said Paynter was still "a bit rusty", but the trainer was happy with Paynter's race. He was entered in the Breeders' Cup Classic, on November 2. Before the race, he had a very strong workout and Baffert said that Paynter was "a monster" and "back to top form", and Ahmed Zayat stated, "Paynter is a horse like no other ... The fact that he's even competing in the Breeders' Cup is miraculous." Though he finished 7th out of 11 horses, with Mucho Macho Man winning again, Paynter finished ahead of a fellow Awesome Again son, the stakes-winning favorite Game On Dude.

== Retirement and stud career ==
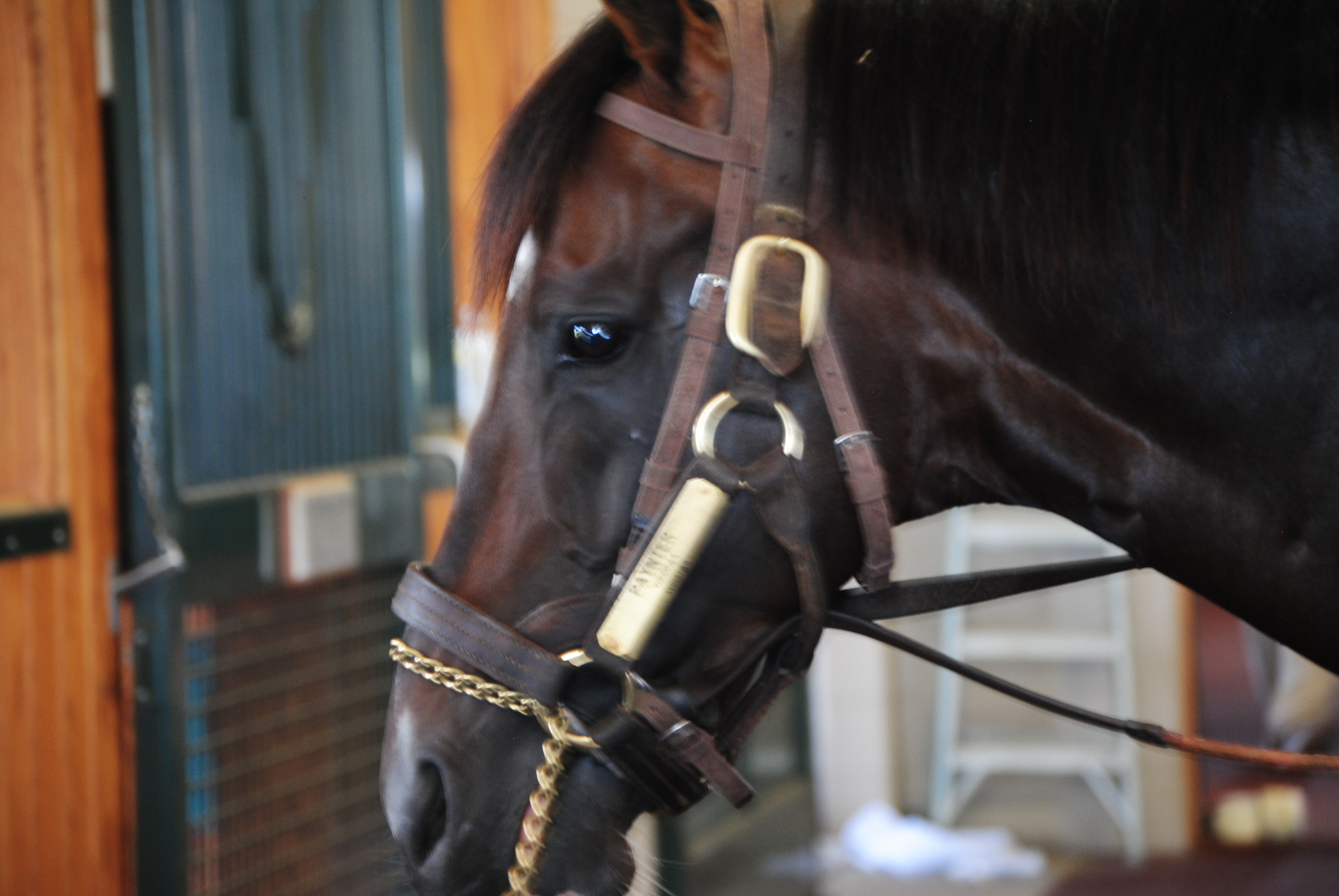
Paynter in retirement

After the Breeders' Cup, Paynter was retired and shipped to WinStar Farm to begin his stud career. His initial stud fee was set at $25,000 for the 2014 breeding season. Before his arrival, WinStar commissioned a unique, colorful 20 feet (6.1 m) long graffiti-style mural, created by Louisville street artist Braylyn Stewart. The artwork featured the slogan "Paynter: Awesome Heart", and was surrounded by quotations about the horse and assorted references to his racing career. The decision to use graffiti art as a promotional tool was to reflect Paynter's toughness and "street fighter" image. Artist Stewart also expressed hope that the artwork would help put graffiti art in a positive light and encourage young people to get involved with the arts.

In 2017, the first of Paynter's offspring began racing, and his first winner was a two-year-old filly named Dark Artist, who won at Monmouth Park on July 30. Knicks Go became the first offspring of Paynter to win a Breeders' Cup race when he won the 2020 Breeders' Cup Dirt Mile in track record time. Knicks Go then went on to win the 2021 Pegasus World Cup and 2021 Breeders' Cup Classic.

== Death ==
On November 10, 2023, WinStar Farm announced that Paynter, aged 14, was euthanized due to lameness.

== Racing statistics ==
Date	Age	Distance	Race	Grade	Track	Surface	Odds	Time	Field	Finish	Margin	Jockey	Trainer	Owner	Citation
February 18, 2012	3	5.5 furlongs (11/16 mile or 1,100 m)	Maiden Special Weight	Maiden	Santa Anita	Dirt	0.40	1:02.98	4	1	0.25 lengths	Martin Garcia	Bob Baffert	Zayat Stables, LLC	
April 7, 2012	3	9 furlongs (1 1/8 miles or 1,800 m)	Santa Anita Derby	1	Santa Anita	Dirt	9.90	1:47.88	9	4	N/A	Martin Garcia	Bob Baffert	Zayat Stables, LLC	
April 28, 2012	3	8 furlongs (1 mile or 1,600 m)	Derby Trial Stakes	3	Churchill Downs	Dirt	1.30	1:35.27	8	2	1.5 lengths	Martin Garcia	Bob Baffert	Zayat Stables, LLC	
May 19, 2012	3	8.5 furlongs (1 1/16 miles or 1,700 m)	Allowance	None	Pimlico	Dirt	0.10	1:42.96	6	1	5.75 lengths	Mike Smith	Bob Baffert	Zayat Stables, LLC	
June 9, 2012	3	12 furlongs (1 1/2 miles or 2,400 m)	Belmont Stakes	1	Belmont	Dirt	4.30	2:30.42	11	2	Neck	Mike Smith	Bob Baffert	Zayat Stables, LLC	
July 29, 2012	3	9 furlongs (1 1/8 miles or 1,800 m)	Haskell Invitational	1	Monmouth	Dirt	1.00	1:48.87	6	1	3.75 lengths	Rafael Bejarano	Bob Baffert	Zayat Stables, LLC	
June 14, 2013	4	7 furlongs (7/8 mile or 1,400 m)	Allowance	None	Hollywood	Synthetic	0.40	1:21.86	8	1	4.5 lengths	Rafael Bejarano	Bob Baffert	Zayat Stables, LLC	
July 27, 2013	4	8.5 furlongs (1 1/16 miles or 1,700 m)	San Diego Handicap	2	Del Mar	Polytrack	3.60	1:41.83	6	2	neck	Rafael Bejarano	Bob Baffert	Zayat Stables, LLC	
August 31, 2013	4	9 furlongs (1 1/8 miles or 1,800 m)	Woodward Stakes	1	Saratoga	Dirt	1.50	1:49.28	5	5	N/A	Rafael Bejarano	Bob Baffert	Zayat Stables, LLC	
September 28, 2013	4	9 furlongs (1 1/8 miles or 1,800 m)	Awesome Again Stakes	1	Santa Anita	Dirt	3.40	1:48.30	10	2	4.25 lengths	Martin Garcia	Bob Baffert	Zayat Stables, LLC	
November 2, 2013	4	10 furlongs (1 1/4 miles or 2,000 m)	Breeders' Cup Classic	1	Santa Anita	Dirt	20.90	2:00.72	11	7	N/A	Martin Garcia	Bob Baffert	Zayat Stables, LLC	

Pedigree of Paynter (USA), bay colt (March 4, 2009)
Sire Awesome Again (CAN) 1994	Deputy Minister (CAN); 1979	Vice Regent	Northern Dancer
Sire Awesome Again (CAN) 1994	Deputy Minister (CAN); 1979	Vice Regent	Victoria Regina
Sire Awesome Again (CAN) 1994	Deputy Minister (CAN); 1979	Mint Copy	Bunty's Flight
Sire Awesome Again (CAN) 1994	Deputy Minister (CAN); 1979	Mint Copy	Shakney
Sire Awesome Again (CAN) 1994	Primal Force (USA); 1987	Blushing Groom	Red God
Sire Awesome Again (CAN) 1994	Primal Force (USA); 1987	Blushing Groom	Runaway Bride
Sire Awesome Again (CAN) 1994	Primal Force (USA); 1987	Prime Prospect	Mr. Prospector
Sire Awesome Again (CAN) 1994	Primal Force (USA); 1987	Prime Prospect	Square Generation
Dam Tizso (USA) 1995	Cees Tizzy (USA); 1987	Relaunch	In Reality
Dam Tizso (USA) 1995	Cees Tizzy (USA); 1987	Relaunch	Foggy Note
Dam Tizso (USA) 1995	Cees Tizzy (USA); 1987	Tizly	Lyphard
Dam Tizso (USA) 1995	Cees Tizzy (USA); 1987	Tizly	Tizna
Dam Tizso (USA) 1995	Cee's Song (USA); 1986	Seattle Song	Seattle Slew
Dam Tizso (USA) 1995	Cee's Song (USA); 1986	Seattle Song	Incantation
Dam Tizso (USA) 1995	Cee's Song (USA); 1986	Lonely Dancer	Nice Dancer
Dam Tizso (USA) 1995	Cee's Song (USA); 1986	Lonely Dancer	Sleep Lonely (Family 26)

== Pedigree ==
Paynter was sired by the Canadian-bred Awesome Again, winner of the 1998 Breeders' Cup Classic. At stud, Awesome Again has sired many stakes winners including Ghostzapper, who was 2004 Breeders' Cup winner and 2004 Horse of the Year, and two-time Santa Anita Handicap winner Game On Dude, another Bob Baffert-trained horse. Paynter is closely related to 2013 Preakness Stakes winner Oxbow; the two horses share the same sire and are out of full sisters. Both horses have pedigrees outcrossed for four generations, with very little inbreeding, 4x5x5 to Northern Dancer.

Paynter's dam is Tizso, a full sister to Tiznow, who was 2000 Horse of the Year and won the Breeders' Cup Classic twice. Tizso's dam, Cee's Song, is credited with raising the respect breeders have for her female breeding line, Thoroughbred family 26, as one of the top distaff lines in America. Five full siblings out of Cee's Song were either race winners or the dams of race winners: Paynter's dam Tizso and Oxbow's dam Tizamazing both foaled stakes winners, and Tiznow, Tizbud and Tizdubai all won stakes races. Another Cee's Song son, the gelding Budroyale, was second in the 1999 Breeders' Cup Classic.
