= Awesome Again =

Canadian-bred Thoroughbred racehorse (1994–2020)

- Sire: Deputy Minister
- Grandsire: Vice Regent
- Dam: Primal Force
- Damsire: Blushing Groom
- Sex: Stallion
- Foaled: March 29, 1994; Ontario, Canada
- Died: December 15, 2020 (aged 26); Georgetown, Kentucky, U.S.
- Country: Canada
- Colour: Bay
- Breeder: Frank Stronach
- Owner: Stronach Stables
- Trainer: David Hofmans (1997); Patrick B. Byrne (1998)
- Record: 12: 9–0–2
- Earnings: US$4,374,590

Major wins
- Jim Dandy Stakes (1997); Stephen Foster Handicap (1998); Saratoga Breeders' Cup Handicap (1998); Hawthorne Gold Cup Handicap (1998); Whitney Handicap (1998) Canadian Classic Race wins: Queen's Plate (1997) Breeders' Cup wins: Breeders' Cup Classic (1998)

Honours
- Special Sovereign Award (1998); Canadian Horse Racing Hall of Fame (2001); Awesome Again Stakes at Santa Anita; Awesome Again Lane Aurora ON

Awesome Again (March 29, 1994 – December 15, 2020) was a Canadian Thoroughbred racehorse and stallion. As a three-year-old, he won the Queen's Plate in Canada and the Jim Dandy Stakes in the United States. He was undefeated at age four, scoring his biggest win in the Breeders' Cup Classic after winning the Stephen Foster Handicap, Saratoga Breeders' Cup Handicap, Hawthorne Gold Cup Handicap and Whitney Handicap. He was inducted into the Canadian Horse Racing Hall of Fame in 2001.

At stud, he was an important sire whose offspring include Ghostzapper, an American Horse of the Year.

== Background ==
Awesome Again was a bay horse, bred by Frank Stronach of Newmarket, Ontario, and foaled in Canada. Awesome Again was sired by Deputy Minister, who was the Canadian Horse of the Year as a two-year-old in 1981 and became the leading sire in North America in 1997 and 1998. His dam Primal Force was later named the 2000 Kentucky Broodmare of the Year. Through Primal Force, Awesome Again was a half-brother to 2000 American Champion Two-Year-Old Colt Macho Uno. Stronach's son Andy purchased the mare in 1992 for $95,000 at the Keeneland January Sale based on her excellent pedigree and impressive speed on the track.

Awesome Again raced for Stronach Stable as a homebred. He was originally trained by David Hofmans, then was switched to Patrick B. Byrne's stable in 1998. At maturity, he reached 16 hands (64 inches, 163 cm) high.

== Racing career ==
Awesome Again did not race at age two. At age three in 1997, Awesome Again won Canada's most prestigious race, the Queen's Plate. Otherwise, he raced in the United States, winning the Jim Dandy Stakes and finishing third in the Travers Stakes. His 1997 racing season ended after he suffered a back injury while finishing fifth in the Super Derby. In 1998, Awesome Again went undefeated in six starts, in the process defeating Champions Silver Charm and Skip Away. He came from far back to win over one of the best-ever fields assembled in the Breeders' Cup Classic.

=== 1997: three-year-old campaign ===
Awesome Again made his first start on May 25, 1997, in a maiden special weight at Hollywood Park over seven furlongs. He duelled for the early lead with Reel Wild and hung on to finish third behind the late closing One Man Army. He made his next start on June 5 in another maiden race at Hollywood Park, this time over 1 1/16 miles. He again duelled for the early lead, then started to draw away in the stretch to win by six lengths.

Awesome Again was then shipped north to Woodbine Racetrack in Toronto, Ontario for the Queen's Plate. Despite only having one win, he was still highly regarded by the bettors, going off at odds of 3–1. The favorite was Cryptocloser, who had won the Plate Trial. Ridden for the first time by Mike Smith, he broke slowly but made a strong wide move on the final turn. He took the lead entering the stretch but ducked inside, apparently distracted by the crowd noise. He regained his stride and held off a late drive by Cryptocloser to win by 3 1/2 lengths.

Smith noted that the colt won easily despite racing greenly. "About every 10 times he hit the ground, I had to remind him to stay back on the bridle because he was kind of watching everything. I was kinda all tuckered out. But he wasn't," he said.

Awesome Again returned on August 3 in the Jim Dandy Stakes over a sloppy track at Saratoga Race Course. He went off as the second choice to Behrens, who was undefeated in three starts. Awesome Again settled near the back of the field and was still in seventh after three-quarters of a mile. Swinging wide into the stretch, he started to close strongly and drew off to win by three lengths. "I'm a little surprised with his effort because he ran against some really good horses," said Michelle Jensen, Hofmans' assistant trainer. "On the backside, he was laying a little out of it, so I didn't know what to expect from there. But down the stretch, he kicked in and he got it done."

On August 23, Awesome Again went off as the favorite in the Travers Stakes. He rated behind the early leaders and made his move with Deputy Commander on the final turn. But he tired in the final furlong to finish third, beaten by seven lengths behind Deputy Commander, who was a nose ahead of Behrens. "I really didn't have a good trip," said Smith. "We were stuck the whole way around, and it was too much to overcome. The winner forced us out, and we got caught wide."

Awesome Again finished fifth in his final start of the year, the Super Derby at Louisiana Downs. It was the only time in his career that he finished out of the money.

=== 1998: four-year-old campaign ===
Awesome Again made his four-year-old debut on May 22, 1998, in an allowance race at Churchill Downs. Going off as the heavy favorite, he duelled for the early lead with Democrat, then pulled away in the stretch to win by seven lengths.

On June 13, he faced off with champion Silver Charm in the Stephen Foster Handicap. Silver Charm, winner of the 1997 Kentucky Derby and 1998 Dubai World Cup, was the odds-on favorite despite carrying top weight of 127 pounds. Now ridden by Pat Day, Awesome Again was the third betting choice at 6–1 while carrying only 113 pounds. He rated close to Silver Charm behind the early pace set by Robb. Silver Charm made his move first, hitting the lead when turning for home. Awesome Again closed ground steadily down the stretch, as both horses started to drift. They bumped with half a furlong remaining in the race. Awesome Again drew clear in the final strides to win by a length, with Silver Charm more than five lengths ahead of the third-place finisher. He completed the distance of 1 1/8 miles in 1:48 3/5, just one-fifth off the track record.

After a brief layoff, Awesome Again made his next start in the Whitney Handicap on August 8 at Saratoga. He went off as the 3–2 favorite while carrying 117 pounds, compared to second-favorite Tale of the Cat carrying 114 pounds. The two horses went to the lead while running the first quarter-mile in a leisurely 25.01 seconds. The pace then picked up down the backstretch as the two traded positions. Tale of the Cat opened a one length lead on the final turn but Awesome Again responded and took the lead back in mid-stretch, then continued to draw away to win by three lengths. "They were walking out there," said Day, referring to the slow early pace. "At the three-eighths pole, my horse was so relaxed I didn't know if we were out of the race or if he was just loafing. When I realized he had a lot left in him, I knew we were in the driver's seat."

On August 30, Awesome Again was entered in the Saratoga Breeders' Cup Handicap, where he went off as the 1–4 favorite despite carrying top weight of 120 pounds. He stalked the early pace set by Early Warning, while Day kept an eye on Concerto, the second betting choice carrying just 114 pounds. Concerto made his move first, taking the lead on the final turn. Day swung Awesome Again wide and they started to close rapidly in the stretch, pulling clear late to win by three lengths.

Awesome Again made his next start in the Hawthorne Gold Cup Handicap as the 1–10 favorite while carrying top weight of 123 pounds. He pressed the early pace set by Muchacho Fino, then moved to the lead around the final turn. The two raced heads apart until mid-stretch, when Muchacho Fino started to drop back. Unruled moved into second but was no match for Awesome Again, who won by 1 3/4 lengths. "He ran the way a 1–10 shot should," said Byrne. "We won easily, and he carried the weight. He even had a little left in his tank."

==== Breeders' Cup Classic ====
The field for the 1998 Breeders' Cup Classic, held on November 7 at Churchill Downs, is considered perhaps the deepest in the race's history. The favorite was Skip Away, who had already won seven races that year, five of them Grade I (the Donn Handicap, Gulfstream Park Handicap, Pimlico Special, Hollywood Gold Cup and Woodward Stakes). Despite having been beaten by Awesome Again in the Stephen Foster, Silver Charm was the second choice – a major factor being that the two horses would carry equal weights in the Classic compared to the 14 pound difference in the earlier race. The field also included Grade/Group One winners Swain (King George, Irish Champion), Victory Gallop (Belmont Stakes), Coronado's Quest (Haskell Invitational, Travers Stakes), Touch Gold (1997 Belmont Stakes, Haskell Invitational), Gentlemen (1997 Hollywood Gold Cup, Pacific Classic) and Arch (Super Derby). Between them, the horses had won 69 stakes races, including 31 at the Grade/Group One level. The quality of the field was matched in recent history by only the 1973 Marlboro Cup, where Secretariat defeated stablemate Riva Ridge.

Awesome Again broke slowly and settled into eighth place behind a moderate early pace set by Coronado's Quest. He swung wide on the final turn and started to make up ground but was still in seventh place with a quarter-mile remaining, caught up in traffic. Swain moved to the lead at the top of the stretch, but then lost ground when he swerved to the outside and ultimately finished third. Silver Charm took the lead in mid stretch before he too drifted wide. This opened up a hole through which Awesome Again made his move. He finished strongly to win by three-quarters of a length over Silver Charm. Skip Away was never a factor and finished sixth.

Despite his winning streak, Awesome Again had been largely overlooked because he was considered to have faced weaker competition in his previous starts. "Maybe he did dodge some big guns early," said Day. "But [the Classic] is the granddaddy of them all. This was the greatest field of horses I ever saw."

After an undefeated season and the head-to-head victory over Skip Away and Silver Charm, Byrne felt that Awesome Again deserved consideration for Horse of the Year honours. However, that honour ultimately went to Skip Away, who was considered to have faced consistently stronger competition over the course of the year. Despite having scored one of the biggest wins ever for a Canadian-bred horse, Awesome Again was not eligible for Canadian Horse of the Year honours either since that award requires three starts in Canada during the year. He was however given a special Sovereign Award for his achievements.

Awesome Again retired as the leading Canadian-bred money earner of all time.

=== Statistics ===
Date	Age	Distance	Race	Grade	Track	Odds (Note: An asterisk after the odds means Awesome Again was the post-time favorite)	Field	Finish	Winning Time	Winning (Losing) Margin	Jockey	Ref
May 25, 1997	3	7 furlongs	Maiden Special Weight		Hollywood Park	5.40	10	3	1:22.42	(3 1/2 lengths)	Chris McCarron	
Jun 5, 1997	3	1 1/16 miles	Maiden Special Weight		Hollywood Park	0.80*	8	1	1:42.49	6lengths	Chris McCarron	
Jun 29, 1997	3	1 1/4 miles	Queen's Plate	n/a (Note: The Queen's Plate is not eligible for grading as it is restricted to horses foaled in Canada)	Woodbine	3.00	14	1	2:04.20	3 1/2 lengths	Mike Smith	
Aug 3, 1997	3	1 1/8 miles	Jim Dandy Stakes	II	Saratoga	3.05	9	1	1:51.16	3 lengths	Mike Smith	
Aug 23, 1997	3	1 1/4 miles	Travers Stakes	I	Saratoga	1.45*	8	3	2:04.08	(7 lengths)	Mike Smith	
Sep 28, 1997	3	1 1/4 miles	Super Derby	I	Louisiana Downs	4.30	6	5	2:00.92	(7 1/2 lengths)	Mike Smith	
May 22, 1998	4	1 mile	Allowance		Churchill Downs	0.30*	7	1	1:36.95	7 lengths	Shane Sellers	
Jun 13, 1998	4	1 1/8 miles	Stephen Foster Handicap	II	Churchill Downs	5.90	7	1	1:48.61	1 length	Pat Day	
Aug 8, 1998	4	1 1/8 miles	Whitney Handicap	I	Saratoga	1.40*	8	1	1:49.71	3 lengths	Pat Day	
Aug 30, 1998	4	1 1/4 miles	Saratoga Breeders' Cup Handicap	II	Saratoga	0.25*	7	1	2:03.14	3 lengths	Pat Day	
Oct 10, 1998	4	1 1/4 miles	Hawthorne Gold Cup Handicap	III	Hawthorne	0.10*	8	1	2:02.71	1 3/4 lengths	Pat Day	
Nov 7, 1998	4	1 1/4 miles	Breeders' Cup Classic	I	Churchill Downs	4.70	10	1	2:02.16	3/4 lengths	Pat Day	

== Stud career ==
Retired to stud at the Midway, Kentucky, branch of Stronach's Adena Springs Farms, Awesome Again quickly became an important sire. His most famous son is Ghostzapper, voted the 2004 Eclipse Award for Horse of the Year in the United States and the "World's Top Ranked Horse" for 2004, as compiled by the World Thoroughbred Racehorse Rankings. Awesome Again became the first Breeders' Cup Classic winner to sire a winner of that race when Ghostzapper won the Classic in 2004. On the same day, another son named Wilko won the Breeders' Cup Juvenile, making Awesome Again the first Breeders' Cup winner to sire two Breeders' Cup winners on one day.

He was also the sire of Round Pond, winner of the 2006 Breeders' Cup Distaff. In 2007, Awesome Again became the first Breeders' Cup winner to sire four Breeders' Cup winners when Adena Springs homebred Ginger Punch won the Breeders' Cup Distaff at Monmouth Park. His son Oxbow won the 2013 Preakness Stakes, while son Sir Winston won the 2019 Belmont Stakes. Awesome Again also sired Game On Dude, three-time winner of the Santa Anita Handicap, the Goodwood Stakes, and the Hollywood Gold Cup. His son Paynter was second in the 2012 Belmont Stakes and winner of the Haskell Invitational.

Awesome Again was retired from stud duties in 2019, at which time he had sired 66 black-type winners, including 14 Grade I winners. He was also an influential broodmare sire; at the time of his retirement, his daughters had produced eight champions, including Breeders' Cup Classic winner Accelerate. In 2020, he was donated to Old Friends Equine, and participated in that farm's regular tours.

Awesome Again died on December 15, 2020, at the age of 26 at Old Friends.

=== Notable progeny ===
His notable progeny include:

Foaled	Name	Sex	Major Wins
2000	Ghostzapper	c	2004 Horse of the Year – Breeders' Cup Classic, Woodward Stakes, 2003 Vosburgh, 2005 Metropolitan Handicap
2000	Toccet	c	Champagne Stakes, Hollywood Futurity
2002	Dubai Escapade	f	Ballerina
2002	Round Pond	f	Breeders' Cup Distaff, Acorn Stakes
2002	Spun Sugar	f	Apple Blossom, Go for Wand
2002	Wilko	c	Breeders' Cup Juvenile
2003	Awesome Gem	g	Hollywood Gold Cup
2003	Ginger Punch	f	2007 Champion Older Female – Breeders' Cup Distaff (2007), Go For Wand (2007, 2008), Ruffian (2007), Ogden Phipps Handicap (2008), Personal Ensign (2008)
2003	Sugar Shake	f	Santa Maria Handicap
2004	Daaher	c	Cigar Mile
2007	Game On Dude	g	Santa Anita Handicap (2011, 2013, 2014), Goodwood Stakes (2011, 2012), Hollywood Gold Cup (2012, 2013), Pacific Classic Stakes (2013)
2009	Paynter	c	Haskell Invitational
2010	Oxbow	c	2013 Preakness Stakes
2015	Count Again	g	Frank E. Kilroe Mile (2022), Shoemaker Mile Stakes (2022)
2016	Sir Winston	c	2019 Belmont Stakes

c = colt, f = filly, g = gelding

== Honours ==
Awesome Again was inducted into the Canadian Horse Racing Hall of Fame in 2001. The Goodwood Stakes at Santa Anita Park was renamed in his honour in 2012.

== Pedigree ==
Pedigree of Awesome Again, bay horse, March 29, 1994
Sire Deputy Minister 1979	Vice Regent; 1967	Northern Dancer	Nearctic
Sire Deputy Minister 1979	Vice Regent; 1967	Northern Dancer	Natalma
Sire Deputy Minister 1979	Vice Regent; 1967	Victoria Regina	*Menetrier
Sire Deputy Minister 1979	Vice Regent; 1967	Victoria Regina	Victoriana
Sire Deputy Minister 1979	Mint Copy; 1970	Bunty's Flight	Bunty Lawless
Sire Deputy Minister 1979	Mint Copy; 1970	Bunty's Flight	Broomflight
Sire Deputy Minister 1979	Mint Copy; 1970	Sharkney	Jabneh
Sire Deputy Minister 1979	Mint Copy; 1970	Sharkney	Grass Shack
Dam Primal Force 1987	Blushing Groom (FR); 1974	Red God	*Nasrullah
Dam Primal Force 1987	Blushing Groom (FR); 1974	Red God	Spring Run
Dam Primal Force 1987	Blushing Groom (FR); 1974	Runaway Bride (GB)	Wild Risk (FR)
Dam Primal Force 1987	Blushing Groom (FR); 1974	Runaway Bride (GB)	Aimee (GB)
Dam Primal Force 1987	Prime Prospect; 1978	Mr. Prospector	Raise a Native
Dam Primal Force 1987	Prime Prospect; 1978	Mr. Prospector	Gold Digger
Dam Primal Force 1987	Prime Prospect; 1978	Square Generation	Olden Times
Dam Primal Force 1987	Prime Prospect; 1978	Square Generation	Chavalon (family 1-c)
