= Hot chick =

Hot chick may refer to:

- Slang phrase for an attractive female, see Physical attractiveness#Female physical attractiveness
- The Hot Chick, 2002 American fantasy comedy film
- "Hot Chick" (single), 2006 single by American-French singer Uffie
- "Hotchick", 2011 episode of the Adult Swim TV series, Superjail!

== See also ==
- Certified Hot Chick, 2009 studio album by American rapper Rasheeda
- Hot Dixie Chick, American Thoroughbred racehorse
- Hot chicken, local fried chicken specialty of Nashville, Tennessee
- Chick (disambiguation)
