= Persian Heights =

British-bred Thoroughbred racehorse

- Sire: Persian Bold
- Grandsire: Bold Lad (IRE)
- Dam: Ready and Willing
- Damsire: Reliance
- Sex: Stallion
- Foaled: 29 April 1985
- Country: United Kingdom
- Colour: Chestnut
- Breeder: Banstead Manor Stud
- Owner: Yazid Saud
- Trainer: Geoff Huffer
- Record: 10: 4-2-3

Major wins
- St James's Palace Stakes (1988); International Stakes (1988) (disqualified)

Persian Heights (29 April 1985 – 18 March 1993) was a British Thoroughbred racehorse and sire. As a two-year-old in 1987 he won two of his first three races before sustaining an injury in the Middle Park Stakes. He made a belated winning debut in 1988 before recording his biggest win in the St James's Palace Stakes at Royal Ascot. The colt appeared to have registered another major success when passing the post clear of a top-class field in the International Stakes but was controversially disqualified for causing interference in the straight. He ran well without winning in his last three contests and was retired from racing at the end of the year. After less than five years as a breeding stallion, Persian Heights died in 1993 at the age of eight.

== Background ==
Persian Heights was a "rangy" chestnut horse with a white sock on his left hind leg bred by the Newmarket-based Banstead Manor Stud. His sire, Persian Bold was a successful racehorse who won the Richmond Stakes in 1977. He went on to be a "good" stallion, getting important winners such as Kooyonga, Bold Pilot, Falcon Flight (Prix Hocquart) and Bold Russian (Celebration Mile). Persian Heights' dam Ready and Willing won over one and a half miles as a three-year-old and was a daughter of the Yorkshire Oaks runner-up No Saint.

As a yearling, the colt was offered for sale and bought for 25,000 guineas by representatives of Yazid Saud and Majed AlRasheed. He was trained throughout his racing career by Geoff Huffer at Newmarket, Suffolk.

== Racing career ==
=== 1987: two-year-old season ===
After finishing second on his racecourse debut, Persian Heights contested a maiden race over six furlongs at Great Yarmouth Racecourse and won by six lengths from seven opponents. He followed up in a minor race at Pontefract Racecourse in the following month, winning more easily than the half-length margin of victory suggested. On his final appearance of the season he was moved up sharply in class for the Group One Middle Park Stakes at Newmarket Racecourse on 3 October and started the 7/2 third favourite in a five-runner field. Ridden by Ray Cochrane finished third behind Gallic League and Rahy, reportedly returning from the race with a split pastern.

=== 1988: three-year-old season ===
Following his injury as a juvenile, Persian Heights did not reappear until 8 June 1988 when he started 2/1 second favourite for the Hermitage Stakes over one mile at Newbury Racecourse. He was fourth of the five runners entering the straight but moved up to take the lead approaching the final furlong and drew away to win by four lengths from Dust Devil.

Six days after his win at Newbury, Persian Heights was sent to Royal Ascot for the St James's Palace Stakes: it was the 143rd running of the race and the first to be given Group One status. Ridden by Pat Eddery he started the 9/2 joint second favourite behind the Vincent O'Brien-trained Prince of Birds who had won the Irish 2,000 Guineas on his last start. The other contenders were Raykour (Heron Stakes), Carmelite House (Houghton Stakes), Blushing John, Caerwent (National Stakes) and the French challenger Drapeau Tricolore. Persian Heights turned into the straight in third place behind Carmelite House and Blushing John, before Eddery sent him into the lead approaching the final furlong. He won "comfortably" by one and a half lengths from Raykour, with Caerwent half a length away in third.

After a two-month break, Persian Heights was stepped up in distance and matched against older horses for the first time in the International Stakes over ten and a half furlongs at York Racecourse. He started second favourite behind the Scottish Derby winner Kefaah in a field which also included the filly Indian Skimmer, Shady Heights (Rogers Gold Cup), Fijar Tango (Grand Prix de Paris) and Lapierre (Prix Jean Prat). After turning into the straight fifth of the six runners he accelerated into the lead a furlong out and finished first beating Shady Heights and Indian Skimmer by a length and a half and a neck despite hanging to the left in the closing stages. Indian Skimmer's rider Steve Cauthen lodged an objection to the winner, and the racecourse stewards ruled that Persian Heights had caused interference which prevented the filly from finishing second. Under the rules of racing at the time, Persian Heights was relegated to third, and the race awarded to Shady Heights.

Persian Heights was beaten in his three remaining races, but ran consistently against top-class opposition. In September he started 2/1 favourite for the Irish Champion Stakes at Phoenix Park Racecourse and finished fourth behind Indian Skimmer, Triptych and Shady Heights, proving the best of the three-year-old entrants. Later that month he was brought back in distance for the Queen Elizabeth II Stakes over one mile at Ascot and finished third behind Warning and Salse. On his final appearance he finished second to Indian Skimmer in the Champion Stakes at Newmarket in October, with Doyoun finishing third ahead of Shady Heights.

== Assessment ==
As a two-year-old, Persian Heights was given a rating of 103 by the independent Timeform organisation, making him 24 pounds inferior to the top-rated juvenile Warning. In their annual Racehorses of 1987, they described him as "sure to win more races".

== Stud record ==
Persian Heights was retired from racing to become a breeding stallion at the Castle Hyde Stud in Ireland. On 18 March 1993, in his fifth season at stud he collapsed and died after covering a mare. By far the most successful of his offspring was the popular stayer Persian Punch, whilst the best of his other progeny included Caulfield Cup and Mackinnon Stakes winner, Paris Lane, and the St Simon Stakes winner Persian Brave.

== Pedigree ==
Pedigree of Persian Heights (IRE), chestnut stallion, 1985
Sire Persian Bold (IRE) 1975	Bold Lad (IRE); 1964	Bold Ruler	Nasrullah
Sire Persian Bold (IRE) 1975	Bold Lad (IRE); 1964	Bold Ruler	Miss Disco
Sire Persian Bold (IRE) 1975	Bold Lad (IRE); 1964	Barn Pride	Democratic
Sire Persian Bold (IRE) 1975	Bold Lad (IRE); 1964	Barn Pride	Fair Alycia
Sire Persian Bold (IRE) 1975	Relkarunner (GB); 1968	Relko	Tanerko
Sire Persian Bold (IRE) 1975	Relkarunner (GB); 1968	Relko	Relance
Sire Persian Bold (IRE) 1975	Relkarunner (GB); 1968	Running Blue	Blue Peter
Sire Persian Bold (IRE) 1975	Relkarunner (GB); 1968	Running Blue	Run Honey
Dam Ready and Willing (IRE) 1971	Reliance (FR); 1962	Tantieme	Deux-Pour-Cent
Dam Ready and Willing (IRE) 1971	Reliance (FR); 1962	Tantieme	Terka
Dam Ready and Willing (IRE) 1971	Reliance (FR); 1962	Relance	Relic
Dam Ready and Willing (IRE) 1971	Reliance (FR); 1962	Relance	Polaire
Dam Ready and Willing (IRE) 1971	No Saint (GB); 1957	Narrator	Nearco
Dam Ready and Willing (IRE) 1971	No Saint (GB); 1957	Narrator	Phase
Dam Ready and Willing (IRE) 1971	No Saint (GB); 1957	Vellada	Tourbillon
Dam Ready and Willing (IRE) 1971	No Saint (GB); 1957	Vellada	Tsianina (Family: 16-g)
