= Caerwent (horse) =

Irish-bred Thoroughbred racehorse

- Sire: Caerleon
- Grandsire: Nijinsky
- Dam: Marwell
- Damsire: Habitat
- Sex: Stallion
- Foaled: 20 February 1985
- Country: Ireland
- Colour: Bay
- Breeder: Edmund Loder
- Owner: Edmund Loder
- Trainer: Vincent O'Brien
- Record: 10: 4-2-2

Major wins
- National Stakes (1987); Harp Lager 2000 Guineas Trial (1988); Irish International Stakes (1988)

Awards
- Timeform rating 123p (1987)

Honours
- Top-rated two-year-old in Ireland (1987)

Caerwent (20 February 1985 – after 2000) was an Irish Thoroughbred racehorse and sire. Despite contesting only two races as a juvenile he was rated the best horse of his generation after a five-length win in the Group 1 National Stakes. In the following spring he maintained his unbeaten record with a victory in the Harp Lager 2000 Guineas Trial but was narrowly beaten by his stablemate Prince of Birds in the Irish 2000 Guineas. He went on to win the Irish International Stakes and was placed in the St James's Palace Stakes, Vernons Sprint Cup and Prix de l'Abbaye. He was retired to stud at the end of his second but made little impact as a breeding stallion.

== Background ==
Caerwent was a dark-coated bay horse with no white markings bred by his owner, Edmund Loder, at the family's Eyresfield Stud near the Curragh in County Kildare. The colt was scheduled to be auctioned at the Tattersalls Highlyer sale in 1986 but was withdrawn from the sale after he "threw a splint". He was sent into training with the veteran Vincent O'Brien at Ballydoyle.

His sire, Caerleon, won the Prix du Jockey Club and the Benson & Hedges Gold Cup in 1983 and went on to become an “excellent” breeding stallion, siring the winners of more than 700 races including Generous, Marienbard, Moonax and Warrsan. Caerwent was the first foal of his dam Marwell, an exceptionally fast filly who won the Cheveley Park Stakes, King's Stand Stakes, July Cup and Prix de l'Abbaye and was rated the best female of her generation in Europe. Marwell's dam, Lady Seymour, was undefeated in two races, including the Phoenix Stakes in 1974. As a daughter of My Game, Lady Seymour was also closely related to the Ascot Gold Cup winner Paean and the Oaks winner Unite. Marwell herself went on to produce the outstanding filly Marling.

== Racing career ==
=== 1987: two-year-old season ===
Caerwent made his racecourse debut at Phoenix Park Racecourse in August when he started odds-on favourite in a five-runner field for the Charles Heidsieck Champagne Stakes over six furlongs. He took the lead a furlong from the finish and drew away from his rivals to win by three lengths from Demon Magic. The form of the race was franked when the runner-up won the Futurity Stakes in September. Caerwent was stepped up in class and distance for the Group 1 National Stakes over seven furlongs on soft ground at the Curragh on 12 September and was made the 9/10 favourite. His five opponents were Acajou and Gerrnas from England, Wagon Load (winner of the Orby Stakes), Project Manager (Tyros Stakes) and the 25/1 outsider Ballygarry Prince. Ridden by the American jockey Cash Asmussen, Caerwent went to the front approaching the final furlong and "stormed clear" to win by five lengths from Acajou.

In the official International Classification of European two-year-olds for 1987, Caerwent was rated the joint fifth best colt of the year and the best juvenile trained in Ireland. The independent Timeform organisation gave him a rating of 123p (the "p" indicating that he was expected to make more than usual progress) making him six pounds inferior to Warning, who was their top-rated two-year-old.

=== 1987: three-year-old season ===
Caerwent began his second campaign in the Listed Harp Lager 2000 Guineas Trial over seven furlongs at Phoenix Park on 2 April. Ridden by John Reid he started at odds of 4/9 and won by a length from Saxon Cottage. Four weeks later the still unbeaten colt was sent to England and started the 4/1 second favourite for the 2000 Guineas over the Rowley mile at Newmarket Racecourse but came home fifth of the nine runners behind Doyoun, Charmer, Bellefella and Aiglefin. In the Irish 2000 Guineas on 14 May, Caerwent was made the 6/1 third choice in the betting and looked likely to win after taking the lead inside the final furlong only to be caught on the line and beaten a neck by his stablemate Prince of Birds.

In June Caerwent was sent to England for the second time to contest the St James's Palace Stakes at Royal Ascot and finished third to Persian Heights and Raykour, with Blushing John and Prince of Birds in fourth and fifth. On 2 July the colt was dropped in class and matched against older horses in the Group 2 Lanes End International Stakes over one mile at Phoenix Park. With Reid in the saddle he started the 4/6 favourite and won by one and a half lengths from the British-trained four-year-old Just A Flutter. He was back in England later that month for the Sussex Stakes at Goodwood Racecourse, but after reaching third place in the straight he came home sixth of the nine runners behind Warning.

For his last two races of the year, Caerwent was dropped back in distance to compete in sprint races. In the Vernons Sprint Cup over six furlongs at Haydock Park on 3 September he finished third behind Dowsing and Silver Fling despite hanging badly to the left in the closing stages. The colt ended his racing career in the Prix de l'Abbaye over 1000 metres at Longchamp Racecourse in October. He finished third behind Cadeaux Genereux and Handsome Sailor but was promoted to second place when Cadeaux Genereux was disqualified for causing interference early in the race.

== Stud record ==
Caerwent was retired from racing to become a breeding stallion in Ireland. He later stood in France and Germany before moving to Sweden, where his last foals were born in 2001. He was not a great success as a sire, with the best of his offspring being the Listed race winners Linoise, Green Wind and Passport.

== Pedigree ==
Pedigree of Caerwent (IRE), bay stallion, 1985
Sire Caerleon (USA) 1980	Nijinsky (CAN); 1967	Northern Dancer	Nearctic
Sire Caerleon (USA) 1980	Nijinsky (CAN); 1967	Northern Dancer	Natalma
Sire Caerleon (USA) 1980	Nijinsky (CAN); 1967	Flaming Page	Bull Page
Sire Caerleon (USA) 1980	Nijinsky (CAN); 1967	Flaming Page	Flaring Top
Sire Caerleon (USA) 1980	Foreseer (USA); 1969	Round Table	Princequillo
Sire Caerleon (USA) 1980	Foreseer (USA); 1969	Round Table	Knight's Daughter
Sire Caerleon (USA) 1980	Foreseer (USA); 1969	Regal Gleam	Hail To Reason
Sire Caerleon (USA) 1980	Foreseer (USA); 1969	Regal Gleam	Miz Carol
Dam Marwell (IRE) 1978	Habitat (USA); 1966	Sir Gaylord	Turn-To
Dam Marwell (IRE) 1978	Habitat (USA); 1966	Sir Gaylord	Somethingroyal
Dam Marwell (IRE) 1978	Habitat (USA); 1966	Little Hut	Occupy
Dam Marwell (IRE) 1978	Habitat (USA); 1966	Little Hut	Savage Beauty
Dam Marwell (IRE) 1978	Lady Seymour (GB); 1972	Tudor Melody	Tudor Minstrel
Dam Marwell (IRE) 1978	Lady Seymour (GB); 1972	Tudor Melody	Matelda
Dam Marwell (IRE) 1978	Lady Seymour (GB); 1972	My Game	My Babu
Dam Marwell (IRE) 1978	Lady Seymour (GB); 1972	My Game	Flirting (Family: 14-c)
