= Glad Rags =

Irish-bred Thoroughbred racehorse

- Sire: High Hat
- Grandsire: Hyperion
- Dam: Dryad
- Damsire: Panorama
- Sex: Filly
- Foaled: 1963
- Country: Ireland
- Colour: Chestnut
- Breeder: Captain D. Rogers
- Owner: Alice du Pont Mills
- Trainer: Vincent O'Brien
- Record: 7: 3-0-2

Major wins
- Railway Stakes (1965); 1,000 Guineas Stakes (1966)

Awards
- Irish Champion 2-Year-Old Filly (1965)

Glad Rags (foaled 1963) was an Irish Thoroughbred racehorse. After proving herself the best Irish filly of her generation in a brief two-year-old career, she won the British Classic 1,000 Guineas Stakes on her three-year-old debut. Her subsequent racing career was disappointing, but she has had considerable influence as a broodmare.

== Background ==
Glad Rags was a chestnut filly bred in Ireland by Captain D Rogers. She was sired by High Hat, who won several races (including an upset victory over Petite Etoile) for his owner Sir Winston Churchill. Her dam, Dryad won four minor races and also produced the Stewards' Cup winner Victorina. Glad Rags was only the second Classic winner, after the 1874 Epsom Derby winner George Frederick to be produced by Thoroughbred Family 13-b.

As a yearling, Glad Rags was sent to the Newmarket sales where she was bought for 6,800 guineas by American Alice du Pont Mills, a member of the prominent Du Pont family who was an advisory trustee to the National Museum of Racing and Hall of Fame at Saratoga Springs, New York, and a director of the American Grayson-Jockey Club Research Foundation.

Glad Rags was sent into training with Vincent O'Brien at his Ballydoyle stable.

== Racing career ==
Despite running only three times in 1965, Glad Rags proved herself the best two-year-old filly in Ireland. After winning a race over five furlongs at Leopardstown, she defeated a field of colts to take the Railway Stakes over six furlongs at the Curragh. On her final start of the season she was sent to England to contest the Royal Lodge Stakes over a mile at Ascot. Racing in mixed-sex company she finished third to the leading British filly Soft Angels.

On her three-year-old debut, Glad Rags returned to England to contest the Classic 1000 Guineas at Newmarket. Ridden by Paul Cook she started at odds of 100/6 in a field of twenty-one fillies. In a close finish, she won by a neck from Berkeley Springs, with the favourite Miliza in third ahead of Soft Angels, who had behaved in a "regrettably wayward" manner before the start. Her success gave O'Brien his only win in the race. Glad Rags failed to win in her three remaining starts. In the Irish 1,000 Guineas she started odds-on favourite but finished unplaced behind her stable companion Valoris who went on to win The Oaks. She showed better form when finishing third in the Coronation Stakes but then finished last in the Sussex Stakes.

== Breeding record ==
Following her retirement from racing, Glad Rags was sent to the United States (where she was known as Glad Rags II) to serve as a broodmare. She produced eleven foals by stallions including Alydar, Buckpasser, Hoist The Flag, Native Dancer, Nijinsky, Raise a Native, Sir Ivor. The best of her progeny (both sired by Nijinsky) were the colt Gorytus who won the Champagne Stakes and the filly Terpsichorist whose wins included the Grade II Sheepshead Bay Stakes. Another of her daughters was Better Begin, the grand-dam of the Irish 2000 Guineas winner Prince of Birds. Her modern descendants include Terpsichorist's grandson Union Rags, the winner of the 2012 Belmont Stakes, and Declaration of War, winner of the Queen Anne Stakes and International Stakes in 2013.

== Pedigree ==
Pedigree of Glad Rags, chestnut mare, 1963
Sire High Hat (GB) 1957	Hyperion (GB); 1930	Gainsborough	Bayardo
Sire High Hat (GB) 1957	Hyperion (GB); 1930	Gainsborough	Rosedrop
Sire High Hat (GB) 1957	Hyperion (GB); 1930	Selene	Chaucer
Sire High Hat (GB) 1957	Hyperion (GB); 1930	Selene	Serenissima
Sire High Hat (GB) 1957	Madonna (GB); 1945	Donatello	Blenheim
Sire High Hat (GB) 1957	Madonna (GB); 1945	Donatello	Delleana
Sire High Hat (GB) 1957	Madonna (GB); 1945	Women's Legion	Coronach
Sire High Hat (GB) 1957	Madonna (GB); 1945	Women's Legion	Victress
Dam Dryad (IRE) 1950	Panorama (GB); 1936	Sir Cosmo	The Boss
Dam Dryad (IRE) 1950	Panorama (GB); 1936	Sir Cosmo	Ayn Hali
Dam Dryad (IRE) 1950	Panorama (GB); 1936	Happy Climax	Happy Warrior
Dam Dryad (IRE) 1950	Panorama (GB); 1936	Happy Climax	Clio
Dam Dryad (IRE) 1950	Woodside (IRE); 1937	Furrokh Siyar	Colorado
Dam Dryad (IRE) 1950	Woodside (IRE); 1937	Furrokh Siyar	Mumtaz Mahal
Dam Dryad (IRE) 1950	Woodside (IRE); 1937	Princess Argosy	Argosy
Dam Dryad (IRE) 1950	Woodside (IRE); 1937	Princess Argosy	Eminent Lady (Family: 13-b)
