= Michael R. Matz =

American racehorse trainer and equestrian

Michael Matz
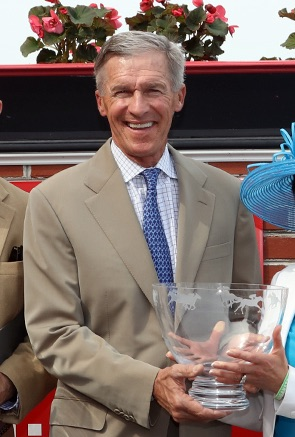
- Matz in 2016

Personal information
- Born: January 23, 1951 (age 75) Reading, Pennsylvania, U.S.
- Occupation: Trainer

Horse racing career
- Sport: Horse racing
- Career wins: 655+ (ongoing)

Major racing wins
- American Classics / Breeders' Cup wins: Kentucky Derby (2006); Belmont Stakes (2012); Breeders' Cup Distaff (2006)

Significant horses
- Barbaro, Round Pond, Union Rags

Michael Matz

Personal information
- Full name: Michael Ray Matz
- Nationality: American
- Discipline: Show jumping
- Born: January 23, 1951 (age 75); Reading, Pennsylvania, U.S.
Medal record
Equestrian
Representing the United States
Olympic Games
Silver medal – second place	1996 Atlanta	Team jumping
World Championships
Gold medal – first place	1986 Aachen	Team jumping
Bronze medal – third place	1978 Aachen	Individual jumping
Bronze medal – third place	1978 Aachen	Team jumping
Pan American Games
Gold medal – first place	1975 Mexico City	Team jumping
Gold medal – first place	1979 San Juan	Individual jumping
Gold medal – first place	1979 San Juan	Team jumping
Gold medal – first place	1983 Caracas	Team jumping
Gold medal – first place	1995 Mar del Plata	Individual jumping
Bronze medal – third place	1975 Mexico City	Individual jumping
Bronze medal – third place	1983 Caracas	Individual jumping
Bronze medal – third place	1995 Mar del Plata	Team jumping

Michael R. Matz (born January 23, 1951) is an American race horse trainer and former Olympic equestrian team member who was inducted into the show jumping Hall of Fame. He lives in Coatesville, Pennsylvania. As a trainer, he has scored two wins in the Classics, the 2012 Belmont Stakes with Union Rags and the 2006 Kentucky Derby with Barbaro. Matz also was named "person of the week" by ABC News for his heroism in saving four children from the crash of United Airlines Flight 232 in 1989 on which he was a passenger.

== Equestrian career ==
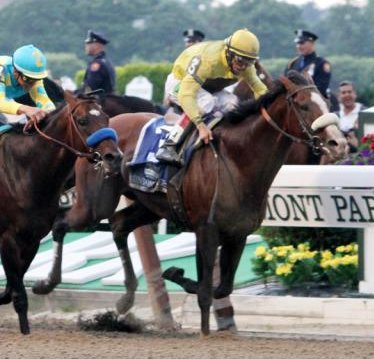
Union Rags, winning the 2012 Belmont Stakes

Matz had a successful equestrian career as a show jumping rider. He was a six-time U.S. national champion, and won at least one major show jumping event in 20 consecutive years. Matz won team gold at the 1986 World Championships in Aachen riding Chef, to go with his individual and team bronze medals he won at the 1978 World Equestrian Games while riding Jet Run on whom Matz also won the 1981 Show Jumping World Cup. Matz won a total of four gold medals and four bronze medals at the Pan American Games, and was a member of the U.S. Olympic equestrian teams in 1976, 1992, and 1996. In 1996, he won a team silver medal on Rhum IV, in the show jumping equestrian event, along with Peter Leone, Leslie Burr-Howard, and Anne Kursinski. Matz was also chosen to carry the United States flag into Centennial Olympic Stadium at the closing ceremonies of the 1996 Games. He retired from show jumping as the leading money-winning rider in the sport's American history, with over $1.7 million. On April 1, 2006, Matz was inducted into the Show Jumping Hall of Fame.

He began to train Thoroughbreds in 1998, making race horse training his full-time profession after he failed to make the 2000 Olympic team. He trains at the Fair Hill Training Center, in Maryland. In addition to Barbaro, he trained the 2005 Arlington Million winner Kicken Kris, and shortly after Barbaro's injury, he returned to the scene of his greatest victory to score another major Churchill Downs win at the 2006 Breeders' Cup Distaff with Round Pond. In 2012 he trained Union Rags to become the winner of the 144th Belmont Stakes.

== United Airlines Flight 232 ==
Matz was chosen for the honor of carrying the flag at the 1996 closing ceremonies not only because of his career in the show ring, but also for an extraordinary act of heroism seven years before. On July 19, 1989, Matz and his then-fiancée D.D. Alexander were traveling home from judging a horse show in Hawaii. They missed their connection from Denver to Philadelphia, and had a choice of two flights 20 minutes apart. They chose United Airlines Flight 232.

After a catastrophic engine failure that destroyed all of the plane's hydraulic systems, the plane crashed at Sioux Gateway Airport in Sioux City, Iowa. Although 112 people were killed, Matz not only survived, but led four young children to safety. He first led to safety three siblings who were traveling alone, and then went into the burning wreckage to save an 11-month-old girl. He was named "Person of the Week" by ABC News for his heroism on Flight 232. Matz has remained in touch with the three siblings, who were at Churchill Downs on Derby Day 2006, and met with him during the run-up to the race.
