= Valoris =

French-bred Thoroughbred racehorse

- Racing silks of Sir Charles Clore
- Sire: Tiziano
- Grandsire: Sicambre
- Dam: Vali
- Damsire: Sunny Boy
- Sex: Mare
- Foaled: 1963
- Country: France
- Colour: Bay or brown
- Breeder: Robert Forget
- Owner: Charles Clore
- Trainer: Vincent O'Brien
- Record: 6: 3-0-1

Major wins
- Irish 1000 Guineas (1966); Epsom Oaks (1966)

Awards
- Timeform rating 120 (1966)

Valoris (1963 – after 1982) was a French-bred, Irish-trained Thoroughbred racehorse and broodmare. After showing promising form without winning a race as a juvenile in 1965 she developed into a top-class performer the following spring when she recorded emphatic victories in the Irish 1000 Guineas and the Epsom Oaks. She was well beaten in two subsequent starts and was retired from racing at the end of the year. She later had considerable success as a broodmare.

== Background ==
Valoris was a "tall, dark, leggy" brown mare, with no white markings bred in France by Robert Forget. As a yearling she was bought by the British businessman Charles Clore and was sent into training with Vincent O'Brien at Ballydoyle in Ireland. O'Brien regarded the filly highly although he believed that she had a problem with her eyesight, noting her tendency to "duck away" from objects - even familiar ones - on the training gallops.

Her sire, Tiziano, was bred in Britain but raced in Italy where he won the St Leger Italiano in 1960. Her dam Vali won one race as a three-year-old in 1957 before becoming a very successful broodmare who produced several other winners including the Prix du Jockey Club winner Val de Loir and was the female-line ancestor of Petoski. She was a granddaughter of the influential Irish broodmare Carpet Slipper (foaled 1930), whose other descendants have included Big Brown, Godiva, Golan, North Light and St Jovite.

== Racing career ==
=== 1965: two-year-old season ===
Valoris ran twice as a two-year-old in Ireland and showed considerable promise although she failed to win on either occasion.

=== 1966: three-year-old season ===
Valoris began her second season in the Irish 1000 Guineas over one mile at the Curragh in May and went off at odds of 9/1, with her stablemate Glad Rags starting favourite. Ridden by J Power, she won easily from Loyalty (Athasi Stakes) and Lady Clodagh, with Glad Rags unplaced.

Lester Piggott took the ride when Valoris started 11/10 favourite against twelve opponents for the 188th running of the Oaks Stakes over one and a half miles at Epsom Racecourse. The booking of Piggott was controversial as he had been the stable jockey for the Newmarket trainer Noel Murless and had been expected to ride the stable's contender Varinia.Piggott had not been retained in 1966 but had continued to ride for Murless whilst expressing the desire to go freelance. Before the race O'Brien told the jockey "When you do hit the front, just be sure that you catch a good hold of her because with the crowds and the cheering she might easily start to duck around". When Valoris became agitated in the before the race Piggott dismounted and led the filly the last quarter mile to the start. Having tracked the leaders in the early stages Valoris took the lead three furlongs out and won very comfortably by two and a half lengths from the 1000 Guineas runner-up Berkeley Springs with Varinia three lengths back in third.

The filly was expected to follow up in the Irish Oaks at the Curragh in July but failed to reproduce her best form on the prevailing firm ground and finished unplaced behind Merry Mate. In September she was sent to France for the Prix Vermeille over 2400 metres at Longchamp Racecourse but ran unplaced in a race won by Haltilala.

== Breeding record ==
At the end of her racing career, Valoris was retired to become a broodmare for her owner's stud. After Charles Clore's death in 1979, she was auctioned at Keeneland and was bought for $200,000 by Laszlo Urban. She produced at least nine foals and four winners between 1968 and 1982:

- Vincennes, a bay filly, foaled in 1968, sired by Vieux Manoir. Won one race, second in Irish Oaks
- Valcupid, brown filly, 1969, by Dan Cupid. Failed to win a race.
- Relkoris, bay colt, 1970, by Relko
- Vals Girl, brown filly, 1972, by Sir Ivor. Won Pretty Polly Stakes, second in Epsom Oaks.
- Valinsky, bay colt, 1974, by Nijinsky. Won three races including Geoffrey Freer Stakes.
- Vaal Reef, brown filly, 1975, by Mill Reef. Unraced
- Raise Your Spirits, colt, 1976, by Raise A Native. Failed to win a race. Sire in Japan.
- Salva, brown filly, 1981, by Secretariat. Unraced
- Savannah Dancer, brown filly, 1982, by Northern Dancer. Won six races including Del Mar Oaks. Female-line ancestor of One Cool Cat and State Shinto (Prix Dollar).

== Assessment and honours ==
The independent Timeform organisation awarded Valoris a rating of 120 in 1966. In their book, A Century of Champions, based on the Timeform rating system, John Randall and Tony Morris rated Valoris an "inferior" winner of the Oaks.

== Pedigree ==
Pedigree of Valoris (FR), bay or brown mare, 1963
Sire Tiziano (FR) 1959	Sicambre (FR); 1948	Prince Bio	Prince Rose
Sire Tiziano (FR) 1959	Sicambre (FR); 1948	Prince Bio	Biologie
Sire Tiziano (FR) 1959	Sicambre (FR); 1948	Sif	Rialto
Sire Tiziano (FR) 1959	Sicambre (FR); 1948	Sif	Suavita
Sire Tiziano (FR) 1959	Trevisana (ITY); 1945	Niccolo dell'Arca	Coronach
Sire Tiziano (FR) 1959	Trevisana (ITY); 1945	Niccolo dell'Arca	Nogara
Sire Tiziano (FR) 1959	Trevisana (ITY); 1945	Tofanella	Apelle
Sire Tiziano (FR) 1959	Trevisana (ITY); 1945	Tofanella	Try Try Again
Dam Vali (FR) 1954	Sunny Boy (FR); 1944	Jock	Asterus
Dam Vali (FR) 1954	Sunny Boy (FR); 1944	Jock	Naic
Dam Vali (FR) 1954	Sunny Boy (FR); 1944	Fille de Soleil	Solario
Dam Vali (FR) 1954	Sunny Boy (FR); 1944	Fille de Soleil	Fille de Salut
Dam Vali (FR) 1954	Her Slipper (GB); 1936	Tetratema	The Tetrarch
Dam Vali (FR) 1954	Her Slipper (GB); 1936	Tetratema	Scotch Gift
Dam Vali (FR) 1954	Her Slipper (GB); 1936	Carpet Slipper	Phalaris
Dam Vali (FR) 1954	Her Slipper (GB); 1936	Carpet Slipper	Simons Shoes (Family 5-h)
