= Hot Dixie Chick =

American-bred Thoroughbred racehorse

- Sire: Dixie Union
- Grandsire: Dixieland Band
- Dam: Above Perfection
- Damsire: In Excess
- Sex: Mare
- Foaled: March 31, 2007 (age 18); Lexington, Kentucky, U.S.
- Country: United States
- Colour: Dark bay or brown
- Breeder: Grace Stables
- Owner: Grace Stables
- Trainer: Steve Asmussen
- Record: 7: 4-1-2
- Earnings: US$343,252

Major wins
- Schuylerville Stakes (2009); Spinaway Stakes (2009)
- Last updated on May 3, 2012

Hot Dixie Chick (foaled March 31, 2007) is an American Thoroughbred racehorse.

== Background ==
Hot Dixie Chick was foaled on March 31, 2007, at Gerry Dilger's Dromoland Farm near Lexington, Kentucky. She was sired by Dixie Union, a son of the stakes winner Dixieland Band, and she is out of the mare Above Perfection, by the Irish-bred stallion In Excess, making her a half sister to 2017 Kentucky Derby winner Always Dreaming.

== Racing career ==
=== 2009: two-year-old season ===
Hot Dixie Chick broke her maiden in her second race, setting what was then the Churchill Downs track record for 5 furlongs on dirt in the process. In that race, she defeated future Breeders' Cup Juvenile Fillies Turf winner Tapitsfly. She then went on to win the 6-furlong, Grade III Schuylerville Stakes at Saratoga Race Course. In her next outing, she won the Grade I, 7-furlong Spinaway Stakes in stakes-record time of 1:22.28.

=== 2010: three-year-old season ===
Hot Dixie Chick raced three times as a three-year-old. Her first race was a win in the 6-furlong Prima Donna Stakes at Oaklawn Park on March 20, which she won by 5 3/4 lengths. She then finished her 3-year-old season with third-place finishes in both the Eight Belles Stakes and Winning Colors Stakes at Churchill Downs.

== Offspring ==
Hot Dixie Chick was bred to Curlin in 2011, and produced a colt named Union Jackson the following year on February 7, 2012. Trained by Steve Asmussen, Union Jackson placed 3rd in the Aristides Stakes at Churchill Downs on June 4, 2016.

She has also produced Marcy Darcy, a filly by Smart Strike born March 22, 2014, and an unnamed filly by Street Cry in 2015.

== Pedigree ==
Pedigree of Hot Dixie Chick, dark bay or brown mare, March 31, 2007
Sire Dixie Union 1997	Dixieland Band	Northern Dancer	Nearctic
Sire Dixie Union 1997	Dixieland Band	Northern Dancer	Natalma
Sire Dixie Union 1997	Dixieland Band	Mississippi Mud	Delta Judge
Sire Dixie Union 1997	Dixieland Band	Mississippi Mud	Sand Buggy
Sire Dixie Union 1997	She's Tops	Capote	Seattle Slew
Sire Dixie Union 1997	She's Tops	Capote	Too Bald
Sire Dixie Union 1997	She's Tops	She's A Talent	Mr. Prospector
Sire Dixie Union 1997	She's Tops	She's A Talent	Paintbrush
Dam Above Perfection 1998	In Excess (IRE)	Siberian Express	Caro (IRE)
Dam Above Perfection 1998	In Excess (IRE)	Siberian Express	Indian Call
Dam Above Perfection 1998	In Excess (IRE)	Kantado (IRE)	Saulingo (GB)
Dam Above Perfection 1998	In Excess (IRE)	Kantado (IRE)	Vi (GB)
Dam Above Perfection 1998	Something Perfect	Somethingfabulous	Northern Dancer
Dam Above Perfection 1998	Something Perfect	Somethingfabulous	Somethingroyal
Dam Above Perfection 1998	Something Perfect	Happening	Terrang
Dam Above Perfection 1998	Something Perfect	Happening	Lazy Mary (Family 4-p)

Hot Dixie Chick is inbred 3 × 4 to Northern Dancer, meaning Northern Dancer appears once in the 3rd generation and once in the 4th generation of her pedigree.
