= Gorytus (horse) =

American-bred Thoroughbred racehorse (1980–1996)

- Sire: Nijinsky
- Grandsire: Northern Dancer
- Dam: Glad Rags
- Damsire: High Hat
- Sex: Stallion
- Foaled: 7 February 1980
- Country: United States
- Colour: Bay
- Breeder: Hickory Tree Farm
- Owner: Alice du Pont Mills
- Trainer: Dick Hern; Woody Stephens
- Record: 8: 2-1-0

Major wins
- Acomb Stakes (1982); Champagne Stakes (1982)

Awards
- Timeform rating: 132
- Last updated on 3 October 2024

Gorytus (7 February 1980 – 18 July 1996) was an American-bred, British-trained Thoroughbred racehorse and sire. As a two-year-old in 1982, he created a very good impression by winning the Acomb Stakes and Champagne Stakes by wide margins and was regarded as a potentially great racehorse. His very poor run when odds-on favourite for the Dewhurst Stakes was believed by some to have been the result of doping. The horse remained in training for two more seasons but never fulfilled his early promise. He made only a modest impact as a stallion.

== Background ==
Gorytus, a handsome bay horse with a small white star, was bred in Virginia by his owner, Alice Mills' Hickory Tree Farm. He was named after the Latin transliteration of the Greek γωρυτός, the name of a bow-case for a short recurve, or Scythian, bow.

Gorytus was sired by Nijinsky, the Canadian-bred winner of the English Triple Crown in 1970 who went on to become a very important stallion. His dam Glad Rags was an Irish-bred mare who won the 1000 Guineas in 1966 and became an influential broodmare: her descendants include Union Rags, the winner of the 2012 Belmont Stakes, and Declaration of War, winner of the Queen Anne Stakes and International Stakes in 2013.

Mills sent the colt to race in Europe where he was trained by Dick Hern at West Ilsley in Berkshire. He was ridden in Britain by Scottish jockey Willie Carson.

== Racing career ==
=== 1982: two-year-old season ===
Gorytus began his racing career at York Racecourse in August in the Acomb Stakes, a race which Dick Hern had previously used to introduce horses such as Bustino and Height of Fashion. He started the 5/1 second favourite behind Salieri, an unbeaten colt trained by Henry Cecil. Salieri led from the start but Carson brought Gorytus forward to join him early in the straight. In the final quarter mile Gorytus took the lead and then accelerated away to win easily by seven lengths. His winning time of 1:23.73 broke the track record by over a second. Salieri was to become a dual Group-2 winner in 1983.

A month later, the colt was moved up in class for the Group Two Champagne Stakes over seven furlongs at Doncaster Racecourse. He started the 8/13 favourite against a field which included All Systems Go, winner of the Seaton Delaval Stakes and Lanson Champagne Stakes, and On Stage, runner-up in the July Stakes and Prix Morny. Carson tracked the leaders before moving Gorytus into the lead two furlongs from the finish. In the closing stages he stretched away from the field, despite Carson never resorting to the whip, and won by five lengths from the Guy Harwood-trained Proclaim. When asked about the colt's targets after the Champagne Stakes, Hern replied "the Dewhurst, the 2000 Guineas and the Derby". Bookmakers responded by making Gorytus 4/1 favourite for the Guineas and 5/1 favourite for the Derby.

Gorytus' final race of the season was the Group One Dewhurst Stakes at Newmarket Racecourse on 15 October, in which he was matched against Cecil's Middle Park Stakes winner Diesis. Gorytus started the 1/2 favourite with Diesis on 2/1, while the other two runners, Gordian and Tough Commander, were outsiders. Carson settled Gorytus in third place, with Lester Piggott restraining Diesis in last place. The favourite appeared to be going well until halfway but then began to struggle and quickly dropped out of contention with Carson looking down at the horse's legs as if he had sustained an injury. Diesis won easily by five lengths, with Gorytus finishing last of the four runners, thirty lengths behind the third-placed Tough Commander.

Despite returning from the race in a distressed state, the colt showed no sign of injury and made a full recovery within twenty-four hours. Several horses in the Hern stable had been suffering from a respiratory infection in October. Hern, however, denied this was a factor, pointing out that the horse had been carefully monitored and tested in the build-up to the Dewhurst and had shown no sign of illness. Carson reported that the horse might have "swallowed his tongue", but this was not supported by veterinary examination. The jockey later suggested that the horse's temperament was at fault, saying that "he took the mickey out of us after his first two races. If I had my time again I'd ride him differently".

The most popular theory was that Gorytus had been "got at" or "nobbled": that is to say that a substance had been deliberately administered to the colt to prevent him from winning. Richard Baerlein, writing in The Guardian, reported that the horse had been seen defecating with abnormal frequency before the race and suggested that Gorytus had been doped with croton oil, a substance used as a laxative for elephants. This would, however, would not be consistent with Hern's statement that the colt lost only ten pounds during the race. Hern had been warned by Phil Bull at Ayr Racecourse a week after Gorytus' win at Doncaster that his biggest problem would be security. Some bookmakers had laid the horse to lose so much in the 2,000 Guineas that they could not afford to pay if he won the race. The tabloid Daily Star presented the theory that the colt had been affected by exposure to an irritant, administered in an aerosol spray as he was led round the pre-race paddock. Carson rejected this idea, saying that no-one had come close enough to the horse to carry out this type of attack. If a substance was administered to the horse, it was not one detectable by testing procedures at the time: the post-race drug test carried out by the Jockey Club produced a negative result.

=== 1983: three-year-old season ===
Gorytus made his first appearance as a three-year-old in the 2000 Guineas over Newmarket's Rowley Mile course on 30 April. He looked fit in the paddock and was made second favourite in the betting at odds of 7/2 in a field of sixteen runners. He briefly disputed the lead before fading into fifth place behind Lomond, Tolomeo, Muscatite and Kuwait Tower. Plans to run the colt in the Derby were abandoned because of the extremely soft ground and he was ruled out of a run in the St James's Palace Stakes at Royal Ascot after developing a respiratory infection.

After further training problems, he eventually reappeared in the Benson and Hedges Gold Cup on 16 August at York. Starting the 7/2 second favourite, he ran well for much of the race before finishing fourth behind Caerleon, Hot Touch and John French, beaten a total of two lengths. Eleven days later, Gorytus started the 6/4 favourite for the Waterford Crystal Mile at Goodwood Racecourse, where he was expected to be favoured by the firmer ground. After being restrained by Carson in the early stages he made some progress early in the straight but quickly weakened and finished fifth of the six runners behind Montekin.

=== 1984: four-year-old season ===
In 1984, Gorytus was transferred to the United States where he was trained by Woody Stephens. On 21 January he finished second in the Royal Palm Handicap at Hialeah Park. Two weeks later he finished fourth behind Four Bases in the Bougainvillea Handicap at the same track. After his first race Stephens questioned the horse's attitude, saying that "he didn't look very genuine".

== Assessment ==
At the end of the 1982 season, the independent Timeform organisation gave Gorytus a rating of 132, making him their second-best two-year-old behind Diesis (133). In the official International Classification he was ranked third behind Diesis and the French colt Saint Cyrien. As a three-year-old he was awarded a rating of 123 by Timeform, while in the International Classification he was rated thirteen pounds inferior to the top-rated three-year-old Shareef Dancer.

== Stud record ==
Gorytus returned from Europe to stand as a breeding stallion at the Coolmore Stud in Ireland in 1985 before being exported to Japan three years later. He was not a very successful sire, with the best of his offspring being the Group Three winners La Monalisa (Prix Penelope), Piani di Caiano (Premio Pisa), Tao (Furstenberg-Rennen) and Gouriev (Horris Hill Stakes). He was also the damsire of the outstanding hurdler Inglis Drever. Gorytus died in Japan on 18 July 1996 at the age of sixteen.

== Pedigree ==
Pedigree of Gorytus (USA), bay stallion, 1980
Sire Nijinsky (CAN) 1967	Northern Dancer (CAN); 1961	Nearctic	Nearco
Sire Nijinsky (CAN) 1967	Northern Dancer (CAN); 1961	Nearctic	Lady Angela
Sire Nijinsky (CAN) 1967	Northern Dancer (CAN); 1961	Natalma	Native Dancer
Sire Nijinsky (CAN) 1967	Northern Dancer (CAN); 1961	Natalma	Almahmoud
Sire Nijinsky (CAN) 1967	Flaming Page (CAN); 1959	Bull Page	Bull Lea
Sire Nijinsky (CAN) 1967	Flaming Page (CAN); 1959	Bull Page	Our Page
Sire Nijinsky (CAN) 1967	Flaming Page (CAN); 1959	Flaring Top	Menow
Sire Nijinsky (CAN) 1967	Flaming Page (CAN); 1959	Flaring Top	Flaming Top
Dam Glad Rags (GB) 1963	High Hat (GB); 1957	Hyperion	Gainsborough
Dam Glad Rags (GB) 1963	High Hat (GB); 1957	Hyperion	Selene
Dam Glad Rags (GB) 1963	High Hat (GB); 1957	Madonna	Donatello
Dam Glad Rags (GB) 1963	High Hat (GB); 1957	Madonna	Women's Legion
Dam Glad Rags (GB) 1963	Dryad (GB); 1950	Panorama	Sir Cosmo
Dam Glad Rags (GB) 1963	Dryad (GB); 1950	Panorama	Happy Climax
Dam Glad Rags (GB) 1963	Dryad (GB); 1950	Woodside	Furrokh Siyar
Dam Glad Rags (GB) 1963	Dryad (GB); 1950	Woodside	Princess Argosy (Family:13-b)
