= Dixieland Band =

American-bred Thoroughbred racehorse

- Sire: Northern Dancer
- Grandsire: Nearctic
- Dam: Mississippi Mud
- Damsire: Delta Judge
- Sex: Stallion
- Foaled: 1980
- Country: United States
- Colour: Bay
- Breeder: Bayard Sharp
- Owner: Mary Sharp
- Trainer: Charles Peoples
- Record: 24: 8-3-4
- Earnings: $401,320

Major wins
- Pennsylvania Derby (1983); Massachusetts Handicap (1984)

Awards
- Leading broodmare sire in North America (2004)

Dixieland Band (1980 – April 7, 2010) was an American Thoroughbred racehorse and sire.

== Background ==
Dixieland Band was bred by Bayard Sharp, a prominent and highly respected Delaware horseman and president of The Blood-Horse Inc. Out of the Sharp-owned multiple stakes winning mare, Mississippi Mud, he was a son of the 20th century's most influential sire, Northern Dancer.

== Racing career ==
In May 1983, Dixieland Band won the Pennsylvania Derby by a neck from Jacques Tip, establishing himself as a contender for the Belmont Stakes. In the Belmont, he finished unplaced behind Caveat.

At age four, he won June's Massachusetts Handicap by two and a quarter lengths from Ward Off Trouble. He was retired after the 1984 racing season to stand at his owner's stud farm in Middletown, Delaware.

== Stud record ==
A successful stallion, as of early 2008 Dixieland Band has sired 114 stakes race winners and 43 Graded stakes race winners, of which five have each earned more than $1 million. In addition, Dixieland Band is the damsire of two Kentucky Derby winners: Monarchos in 2001 and Street Sense in 2007. He is also the damsire of Including, Big Truck, the 2007 Australian Champion Stayer, Delta Blues, and the 2008 Kentucky Derby runner-up Eight Belles.

Owner Bayard Sharp's daughter Sarah is married to prominent Kentucky horseman William S. Farish III. Sharp died in 2002, and Dixieland Band stood at the Farish family's Lane's End Farm in Versailles. Among his progeny were Drum Taps, Bowman's Band, Citidancer, Dixie Brass, and Dixie Union.

At the end of the 2008 breeding season, Dixieland Band was pensioned from stud duties. He was euthanized due to the infirmities of old age on April 7, 2010.

== Pedigree ==
Pedigree of Dixieland Band, bay stallion, 1980
Sire Northern Dancer	Nearctic	Nearco	Pharos
Sire Northern Dancer	Nearctic	Nearco	Nogara
Sire Northern Dancer	Nearctic	Lady Angela	Hyperion
Sire Northern Dancer	Nearctic	Lady Angela	Sister Sarah
Sire Northern Dancer	Natalma	Native Dancer	Polynesian
Sire Northern Dancer	Natalma	Native Dancer	Geisha
Sire Northern Dancer	Natalma	Almahmoud	Mahmoud
Sire Northern Dancer	Natalma	Almahmoud	Arbitrator
Dam Mississippi Mud	Delta Judge	Traffic Judge	Alibhai
Dam Mississippi Mud	Delta Judge	Traffic Judge	Traffic Court
Dam Mississippi Mud	Delta Judge	Beautillion	Noor
Dam Mississippi Mud	Delta Judge	Beautillion	Delta Queen
Dam Mississippi Mud	Sand Buggy	Warfare	Determine
Dam Mississippi Mud	Sand Buggy	Warfare	War Whisk
Dam Mississippi Mud	Sand Buggy	Egyptian	Heliopolis
Dam Mississippi Mud	Sand Buggy	Egyptian	Evening Mist (family: 4-m)
