= Union Rags =

American-bred Thoroughbred racehorse

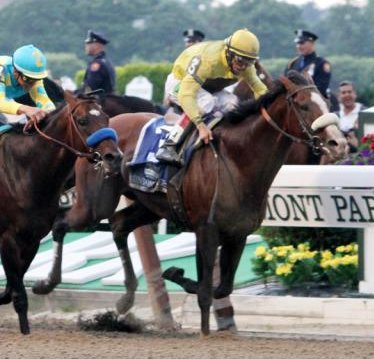
- Union Rags (right) winning 2012 Belmont Stakes over Paynter.
- Sire: Dixie Union
- Grandsire: Dixieland Band
- Dam: Tempo
- Damsire: Gone West
- Sex: Stallion
- Country: United States
- Colour: Bay
- Breeder: Phyllis Mills Wyeth
- Owner: Chadds Ford Stable
- Trainer: Michael R. Matz
- Record: 8: 5-1-1
- Earnings: US$1,798,800

Major wins
- Champagne Stakes (2011); Saratoga Special Stakes (2011); Fountain of Youth Stakes (2012); Triple Crown wins: Belmont Stakes (2012)

Union Rags (born on March 3, 2009, in Kentucky) is a champion American Thoroughbred racehorse who won the 2012 Belmont Stakes. He also won the Champagne Stakes and the Saratoga Special Stakes.

== Background ==
Union Rags is a bay with a white blaze (a wide white stripe down the middle of the face); his sire (father) is Dixie Union who won the Haskell Invitational Handicap in 2000 before becoming a successful stallion. His dam (mother), Tempo, was a granddaughter of the 1000 Guineas winner Glad Rags. Union Rags was bred by Phyllis Mills Wyeth, 71 (in 2012), whose parents Alice du Pont and James Mills were prominent owners and breeders of Thoroughbreds. Wyeth, who is married to artist Jamie Wyeth, was a steeplechase rider when young, but at age 20 suffered a broken neck and spinal cord damage in an automobile accident. Initially able to walk with braces, she has used a motorized chair for many years. Wyeth initially sold Union Rags as a yearling, on the advice of tax accountants, but repurchased the horse the next year. She races Union Rags under her nom de course, Chadds Ford Stable.

== Racing career ==
=== 2011: Two-Year-Old ===
Union Rags made his debut on 12 July when he won a Maiden race at Delaware Park Racetrack. In August, he was moved into Grade II company for the Saratoga Special Stakes and won in "impressive" style by more than seven lengths. On October 8, Union Rags stepped up to Grade I class for the Champagne Stakes at Belmont Park and started the 6/5 favorite against seven opponents. Despite struggling to obtain a clear run on the final turn, he broke clear in the straight to win by more than five lengths from Alpha. Union Rags started favorite for the Breeders' Cup Juvenile at Churchill Downs on November 5. He moved up to challenge the leader Hansen in the straight but "veered" from a straight course before staying on strongly in the closing stages and finishing second by a head. In the voting for the title of American Champion Two-Year-Old Colt, Union Rags finished second to Hansen.

=== 2012: Three-Year-Old Season ===
In his three-year-old debut, Union Rags won the Fountain of Youth Stakes at Gulfstream Park "comfortably" by four lengths from News Pending, with the favored Discreet Dancer two and a quarter lengths further back in third. At the same course five weeks later, Union Rags started the odds-on favorite for the Florida Derby but finished third behind Take Charge Indy. In the Kentucky Derby, he started second favorite at odds of 5.1/1. Following a poor start, and at one point last in the field, he finished seventh of the twenty runners, seven and a half lengths behind I'll Have Another. Union Rags did not run in the 2012 Preakness Stakes but was entered in the Belmont Stakes on June 9. Following the withdrawal of I'll Have Another, Union Rags started second favorite for the race behind Dullahan. John Velasquez settled the colt in fourth place on the rail as Paynter set the pace. In the straight, Union Rags made steady progress on the inside to overtake Paynter in the final strides and won by a neck. After the race, Matz said, "We always thought this horse had Triple Crown potential."

Union Rags was being prepared for a run in the Haskell Invitational when he sustained a tendon injury in his left front leg which ruled him out for the rest of the season. A week later it was announced that Union Rags would not race again and would be retired to stud.

== Stud career ==
Union Rags at Lanes End Farm.

Union Rags entered stud at Lane's End Farm for the 2013 breeding season for a fee of $35,000. His first reported foal, a bay colt out of the Dehere mare Gleaming, was born on January 19, 2014. The colt, now named Confederate Rags, is a winner.

On April 20, 2016, Union Rags had his first winner in Lady Stardust at Aqueduct in a maiden special weight race going 4 1/2 furlongs. On September 3, 2016, the filly Union Strike became his first Grade I winner when she won the Del Mar Debutante Stakes. Union Rags finished second in the 2016 earnings list of first-crop sires based in North America.

Union Rags's most notable progeny include:

- Paradise Woods- Winner of the Gr.I Santa Anita Oaks, Gr.I Zenyatta Stakes
- Union Strike- Winner of the Gr.I Del Mar Debutante Stakes
- Dancing Rags- Winner of the Gr.I Alcibiades Stakes
- Free Drop Billy- Winner of the Gr.I Breeders' Futurity Stakes
- Tequilita- Winner of the Gr.II Forward Gal Stakes and Gr.III Charles Town Oaks
- Patch- Finished 3rd in 2017 Belmont Stakes, famous for having only one eye
- Musawaah- Winner of the Prix de la Seine in France
- No Dozing- Winner of the Concern Stakes, multiple graded stakes placed
- Heneral Kalentong (Philippines) - Winner of triple crown 2020 [Sweep 3 legs]
- Union Bell (Philippines) - 2019 Stakes Horse of the year by Philarcom [6wins for 6starts in 2019]

== Pedigree ==
Pedigree of Union Rags, bay colt, 2009
Sire Dixie Union	Dixieland Band	Northern Dancer	Nearctic
Sire Dixie Union	Dixieland Band	Northern Dancer	Natalma
Sire Dixie Union	Dixieland Band	Mississippi Mud	Delta Judge
Sire Dixie Union	Dixieland Band	Mississippi Mud	Sand Buggy
Sire Dixie Union	She's Tops	Capote	Seattle Slew
Sire Dixie Union	She's Tops	Capote	Too Bald
Sire Dixie Union	She's Tops	She's A Talent	Mr. Prospector
Sire Dixie Union	She's Tops	She's A Talent	Paintbrush
Dam Tempo	Gone West	Mr. Prospector	Raise a Native
Dam Tempo	Gone West	Mr. Prospector	Gold Digger
Dam Tempo	Gone West	Secrettame	Secretariat
Dam Tempo	Gone West	Secrettame	Tamerett
Dam Tempo	Terpsichorist	Nijinsky	Northern Dancer
Dam Tempo	Terpsichorist	Nijinsky	Flaming Page
Dam Tempo	Terpsichorist	Glad Rags	High Hat
Dam Tempo	Terpsichorist	Glad Rags	Dryad
