= 2012 Belmont Stakes =

American horse race

144th Belmont Stakes
- Belmont Stakes
- "The Test of the Champion"
- Location: Belmont Park; Elmont, New York, U.S.
- Date: June 9, 2012
- Distance: 1 1/2 mi (12 furlongs; 2,414 m)
- Winning horse: Union Rags
- Winning time: 2:30.42
- Final odds: 2.75 (to 1)
- Jockey: John Velazquez
- Trainer: Michael R. Matz
- Owner: Chadds Ford Stable
- Conditions: Fast
- Surface: Dirt
- Attendance: 85,811

The 2012 Belmont Stakes was the 144th running of the Belmont Stakes and the race was won by Union Rags ridden by jockey John Velazquez. It was broadcast in the United States by NBC. The post time was scheduled for 6:35 p.m. EDT (10:35 p.m. UTC).

The race was run without a Triple Crown at stake as Kentucky Derby and Preakness Stakes winner I'll Have Another was scratched from the race due to a leg injury. The field was announced on June 8, 2012.

The official attendance was 85,811.

== Payout ==
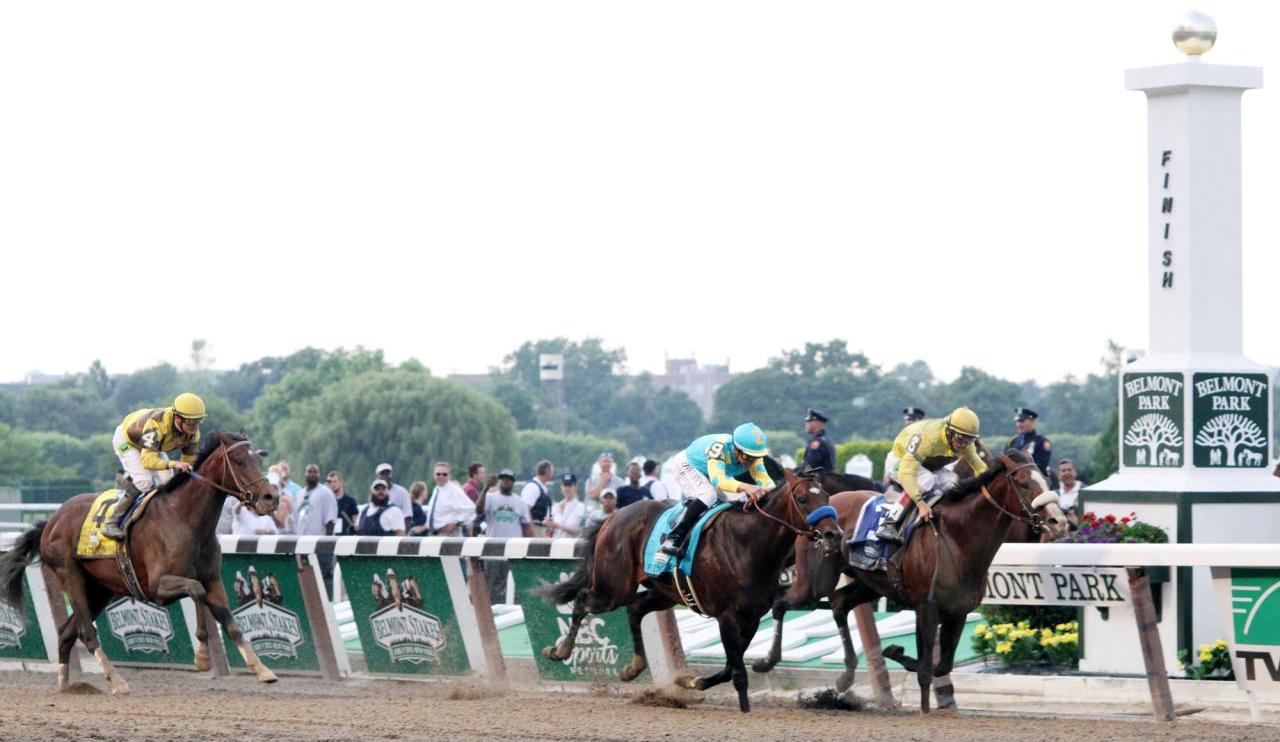
Finish of the 2012 Belmont Stakes: Union Rags (far right) finished first followed by Paynter and Atigun.

The Belmont Stakes Payout Schedule

| Program Number | Horse Name | Win | Place | Show |
|---|---|---|---|---|
| 3 | Union Rags | US$7.50 | $4.20 | $3.40 |
| 9 | Paynter | - | $5.10 | $3.90 |
| 4 | Atigun | - | - | $10.60 |

- $2 Exacta: (3–9) paid $31.40
- $2 Trifecta: (3–9–4) paid $496.00
- $1 Superfecta: (3–9–4–1) paid $1906.00

== Field ==
The winner of the Kentucky Derby and the Preakness Stakes, I'll Have Another, was declared in the race but was scratched due to a leg injury. Dullahan, third in the Kentucky Derby; and Union Rags, seventh in the same race, were also declared.

Dullahan started the 5/2 favorite.

| Position | Post | Horse | Jockey | Trainer | Morning Line Odds | Final Odds | Winnings |
|---|---|---|---|---|---|---|---|
| 1 | 3 | Union Rags | John Velazquez | Michael Matz | 6-1 | 2.75 | $600,000 |
| 2 | 9 | Paynter | Mike E. Smith | Bob Baffert | 8-1 | 4.35 | $200,000 |
| 3 | 4 | Atigun | Julien Leparoux | Kenneth McPeek | 30-1 | 20.50 | $110,000 |
| 4 | 1 | Street Life | Jose Lezcano | Chad Brown | 12-1 | 9.80 | $60,000 |
| 5 | 7 | Five Sixteen | Rosie Napravnik | Dominick Schettino | 50-1 | 19.30 | $30,000 |
| 6 | 2 | Unstoppable U | Junior Alvarado | Kenneth McPeek | 30-1 | 11.90 | |
| 7 | 5 | Dullahan | Javier Castellano | Dale Romans | 5-1 | 2.50 | |
| 8 | 12 | My Adonis | Ramon Dominguez | Kelly Breen | 20-1 | 19.70 | |
| 9 | 6 | Ravelo's Boy | Alex Solis | Manuel Azpurua | 50-1 | 27.00 | |
| 10 | 10 | Optimizer | Corey Nakatani | D. Wayne Lukas | 20-1 | 14.40 | |
| DNF | 8 | Guyana Star Dweej | Kent Desormeaux | Doodnauth Shivmangal | 50-1 | 23.30 | |
| Scratched | 11 | I'll Have Another | Mario Gutierrez | Doug O'Neill | 4-5 | — | — |

- Margins – neck, 1 3/4 lengths
- Time – 2:30:42
- Track – Fast

== See also ==
- 2012 Kentucky Derby
- 2012 Preakness Stakes
