= Vincent O'Brien =

Irish racehorse trainer (1917–2009)

Michael Vincent O'Brien (9 April 1917 – 1 June 2009) was an Irish race horse trainer from Churchtown, County Cork, Ireland. In 2003 he was voted the greatest influence in horse racing history in a worldwide poll hosted by the Racing Post. In earlier Racing Post polls he was voted the best ever trainer of national hunt and of flat racehorses. He trained six horses to win the Epsom Derby, won three Grand Nationals in succession and trained the only British Triple Crown winner, Nijinsky, since the Second World War. He was twice British champion trainer in flat racing and also twice in national hunt racing; the only trainer in history to have been champion under both rules. Aidan O'Brien (no relation) took over the Ballydoyle stables after his retirement.

== The National Hunt years ==
His training career started in 1944. That year, he did the Irish Cambridgeshire/Irish Cesarewitch double with Drybob (dead heat) and Good Days.

In his early days Vincent O'Brien was a trainer at Churchtown of steeplechasers and hurdlers, and won the Grand National at Liverpool three times in succession, with three different horses – Early Mist in 1953, Royal Tan in 1954, and Quare Times in 1955. The greatest steeplechaser he trained was Cottage Rake, which won the Cheltenham Gold Cup three times in succession (1948–1950). He later trained Knock Hard to also win the Cheltenham Gold Cup (1953). He also won the Champion Hurdle three years in succession with Hatton's Grace (1949–1951).

In 1951 he moved to and established the now famous Ballydoyle stables near Cashel in Co. Tipperary.

== The flat years ==
Soon after his third Grand National triumph, he turned his attention to flat racing, and set up his stables at Ballydoyle, near Cashel, County Tipperary. Ballymoss, owned by American businessman John McShain, was O'Brien's first top-flight flat racing horse. This colt won the Irish Derby Stakes and England's St. Leger Stakes in 1957 and France's Prix de l'Arc de Triomphe in 1958, en route to earning European Horse of the Year honours. For another American, Alice du Pont Mills, he trained the filly Glad Rags who in 1966 gave him his only win in the 1,000 Guineas Stakes. O'Brien's first Derby winner was Larkspur in 1962. His other Derby winners were Sir Ivor (1968), Nijinsky (1970), Roberto (1972), The Minstrel (1977) and finally Golden Fleece (1982). O'Brien also trained the brilliant dual Prix de L'Arc de Triomphe winner, Alleged, which triumphed in 1977 and 1978.

During the 1970s, he and owner Robert Sangster, along with O'Brien's son-in-law, John Magnier, established what became known as the Coolmore syndicate, which became a successful horse-racing and breeding operation, centred on Coolmore Stud in County Tipperary, and later incorporating stud farms in Kentucky and Australia. The combination of Vincent O'Brien's incredible gift for picking world class horses and John Magnier's business mind propelled Coolmore Stud to the top of the racing world, boasting greater assets than any other racing stud in Europe, the Middle East, or America. The key to the success was through use of the bloodline of a Canadian-bred horse named Northern Dancer, who had won a Kentucky Derby. One son of Northern Dancer was the British Triple Crown winner, Nijinsky, probably the best horse O'Brien ever trained. Nijinsky was ranked the best ever winner of The Derby by a panel of experts assembled by the Daily Telegraph in 2018. He was ridden to victory at Epsom by Lester Piggott, who was associated with the Ballydoyle stable during the most successful years of the late sixties and seventies.

Other flat racehorses trained by Vincent O'Brien include: El Gran Senor, Gladness, Valoris, Pieces of Eight, Long Look, Boucher, Thatch, Lisadell, Abergwaun, Home Guard, Apalachee, Artaius, Try My Best, Cloonlara, Godswalk, Be My Guest, Marinsky, Lady Capulet, Solinus, Jaazeiro, Thatching, Monterverdi, Solford, Bluebird, Lomond, Godetia, Storm Bird, Kings Lake, Caerleon, Law Society, El Prado, Woodstream, Capriciossa, Prince of Birds, Dark Lomond and College Chapel. He trained Sadler's Wells (by Northern Dancer) to win the Beresford Stakes, Irish 2000 Guineas, Eclipse Stakes and Irish Champion Stakes. Sadlers Wells went on to become the greatest ever European sire and an outstanding 'sire of sires' including Galileo, Montjeu and El Prado.

Vincent O'Brien retired from training in 1994, four years after winning the 1990 Breeders' Cup Mile at Belmont Park in New York with Royal Academy.

Aidan O'Brien was then employed by Coolmore to take over the training responsibilities of Vincent O'Brien. Unlike Vincent, who was involved in every stage of the horses' selecting, training and breeding, Aidan's role involves training whatever horses have been bought or bred for him by Coolmore. This narrow focus has allowed Aidan to produce a great number of winners from Vincent's first rate bloodline of horses, maintaining Coolmore's status as the leading bloodstock company in the world.

In spring 1960, Vincent O'Brien was banned by the Irish Turf Club until November 1961 when after winning a minor race at the Curragh, the colt Chamour was found to have a minute amount of a substance resembling an amphetamine in his system. The horse subsequently won the 1960 Irish Derby when trained by Vincent's brother, Phonsie. O’Brien fought the ban which was overturned on 27 May 1961 with O’Brien receiving a full apology.

== Accolades ==
Vincent O'Brien was voted the greatest national hunt trainer of the 20th century, and was then voted the greatest flat trainer of the 20th century. In the vote for the greatest figure in the history of horseracing hosted by the Racing Post newspaper, Vincent O'Brien came first with 28% of the total vote, with his long-time stable jockey Lester Piggott placed second out of a pool of 100 contenders selected by a panel of racing experts. He was awarded the honorary degrees of Doctor of Laws (LLD) honoris causa by the National University of Ireland, and Doctor of Science (DSc) honoris causa by the University of Ulster.

In 1949, he pioneered the transportation of horses to the races by plane when he transported 3 horses to the 1949 Cheltenham festival in a converted RAF freighter aeroplane. All 3 won their races.

== Family ==
Vincent O'Brien married Jacqueline Wittenoom, from Perth, Australia, in 1951 and had five children, daughters Elizabeth (widow of Kevin McClory), Susan (wife of John Magnier) and Jane (wife of Philip Myerscough); and sons Charles and David who followed in their father's footsteps as trainers, as did Vincent's grandson David Myerscough. Grandsons J P Magnier and M V Magnier have ridden with success as amateur jockeys. Charles was married to Anne Heffernan and had two children (Michael Vincent O'Brien Jr. and Katherine Margaret O'Brien). The marriage was dissolved and he subsequently married Tammy Twomey. They had two daughters (Emily Jillian O'Brien and Penny Jacqueline O'Brien). Altogether Vincent and Jacqueline had 5 children and 19 grandchildren.

O'Brien's older son, David won The Derby in 1984 with Secreto, beating his father's horse, El Gran Senor, by a short head. David, who also won the Irish and French Derbies in 1982 with Assert, is the youngest ever trainer to win an Epsom Derby, an Irish Derby, or a French Derby. However, in a decision that shocked the racing world, David suddenly retired from horse racing in 1988 following the birth of his third son, Charles.

O'Brien and his wife latterly spent half of each year in her home town of Perth, Western Australia and the remainder of the year in Ireland, his wife living for many years at Baltyboys House, Blessington, Co.Wicklow, the one-time home of ballerina Ninette de Valois. He died at his Irish home in Straffan, County Kildare on 1 June 2009, aged 92.

== Major wins on the flat ==
(United Kingdom) Great Britain

- 1,000 Guineas – (1) – Glad Rags (1966)
- 2,000 Guineas – (4) – Sir Ivor (1968), Nijinsky (1970), Lomond (1983), El Gran Senor (1984)
- Ascot Gold Cup – (1) – Gladness (1958)
- Champion Stakes – (2) – Pieces of Eight (1966), Sir Ivor (1968)
- Cheveley Park Stakes – (3) – Lalibela (1967), Woodstream (1981), Capricciosa (1990)
- Coronation Cup – (2) – Ballymoss (1958), Roberto (1973)
- Coronation Stakes – (1) – Lisadell (1974)
- Derby – (6) – Larkspur (1962), Sir Ivor (1968), Nijinsky (1970), Roberto (1972), The Minstrel (1977), Golden Fleece (1982)
- Dewhurst Stakes – (7) – Nijinsky (1969), Cellini (1973), The Minstrel (1976), Try My Best (1977), Monteverdi (1979), Storm Bird (1980), El Gran Senor (1983)
- Eclipse Stakes – (5) – Ballymoss (1958), Pieces of Eight (1966), Artaius (1977), Solford (1983), Sadler's Wells (1984)
- Golden Jubilee Stakes – (5) – Welsh Saint (1970), Saritamer (1974), Swingtime (1975), Thatching (1979), College Chapel (1993)
- Haydock Sprint Cup – (1) – Abergwaun (1972)
- International Stakes – (2) – Roberto (1972), Caerleon (1983)
- July Cup – (5) – Thatch (1973), Saritamer (1974), Solinus (1978), Thatching (1979), Royal Academy (1990)
- King George VI and Queen Elizabeth Stakes – (3) – Ballymoss (1958), Nijinsky (1970), The Minstrel (1977)
- King's Stand Stakes – (5) – Cassarate (1962), Abergwaun (1973), Godswalk (1977), Solinus (1978), Bluebird (1987)
- Middle Park Stakes – (1) – Junius (1978)
- Nunthorpe Stakes – (1) – Solinus (1978)
- Oaks – (2) – Long Look (1965), Valoris (1966)
- Queen Anne Stakes – (1) – Imperial March (1975)
- Racing Post Trophy – (1) – Apalachee (1973)
- St. James's Palace Stakes – (2) – Thatch (1973), Jaazeiro (1978)
- St. Leger Stakes – (3) – Ballymoss (1957), Nijinsky (1970), Boucher (1972)
- Sussex Stakes – (4) – Thatch (1973), Artaius (1977), Jaazeiro (1978), King's Lake (1981)

(Republic of Ireland) Ireland

- Irish 1,000 Guineas – (3) – Valoris (1966), Lady Capulet (1977), Godetia (1979)
- Irish 2,000 Guineas – (5) – El Toro (1959), Jaazeiro (1978), King's Lake (1981), Sadler's Wells (1984), Prince of Birds (1988)
- Irish Champion Stakes – (5) – Inkerman (1978), Fordham (1979), Gregorian (1980), King's Lake (1981), Sadler's Wells (1984)
- Irish Derby – (6) – Chamier (1953), Ballymoss (1957), Nijinsky (1970), The Minstrel (1977), El Gran Senor (1984), Law Society (1985)
- Irish Oaks – (4) – Ancasta (1964), Aurabella (1965), Gaia (1969), Godetia (1979)
- Irish St. Leger – (9) – Barclay (1959), White Gloves (1966), Reindeer (1969), Caucasus (1975), Meneval (1976), Transworld (1977), Gonzales (1980), Leading Counsel (1985), Dark Lomond (1988)
- Matron Stakes – (3) – Kalamaika (1978), Magisterial (1979), Calandra (1980)
- Moyglare Stud Stakes – (2) – Woodstream (1981), Capricciosa (1990)
- National Stakes – (15) – Sir Ivor (1967), Roberto (1971), Chamozzle (1972), Cellini (1973), Sir Wimborne (1975), Monteverdi (1979), Storm Bird (1980), Glenstal (1982), El Gran Senor (1983), Law Society (1984), Tate Gallery (1985), Caerwent (1987), Classic Fame (1988), El Prado (1991), Fatherland (1992)
- Phoenix Stakes – (2) – Cloonlara (1976), Achieved (1981)
- Pretty Polly Stakes – (7) – Little Mo (1959), Ancasta (1964), Iskereen (1967), Rimark (1968), Godetia (1979), Calandra (1980), Dark Lomond (1988)
- Tattersalls Gold Cup – (5) – Nardoo (1963), White Gloves (1967), Selko (1969), Cavo Doro (1973), Golden Fleece (1982)

France

- Prix de l'Arc de Triomphe – (3) – Ballymoss (1958), Alleged (1977, 1978)
- Prix Jean-Luc Lagardère – (1) – Sir Ivor (1967)
- Prix du Jockey Club – (1) – Caerleon (1983)
- Prix Maurice de Gheest – (1) – College Chapel (1993)

United States

- Breeders' Cup Mile – (1) – Royal Academy (1990)
- Washington, D.C. International – (1) – Sir Ivor (1968)
