= Skippylongstocking =

Winning racehorse

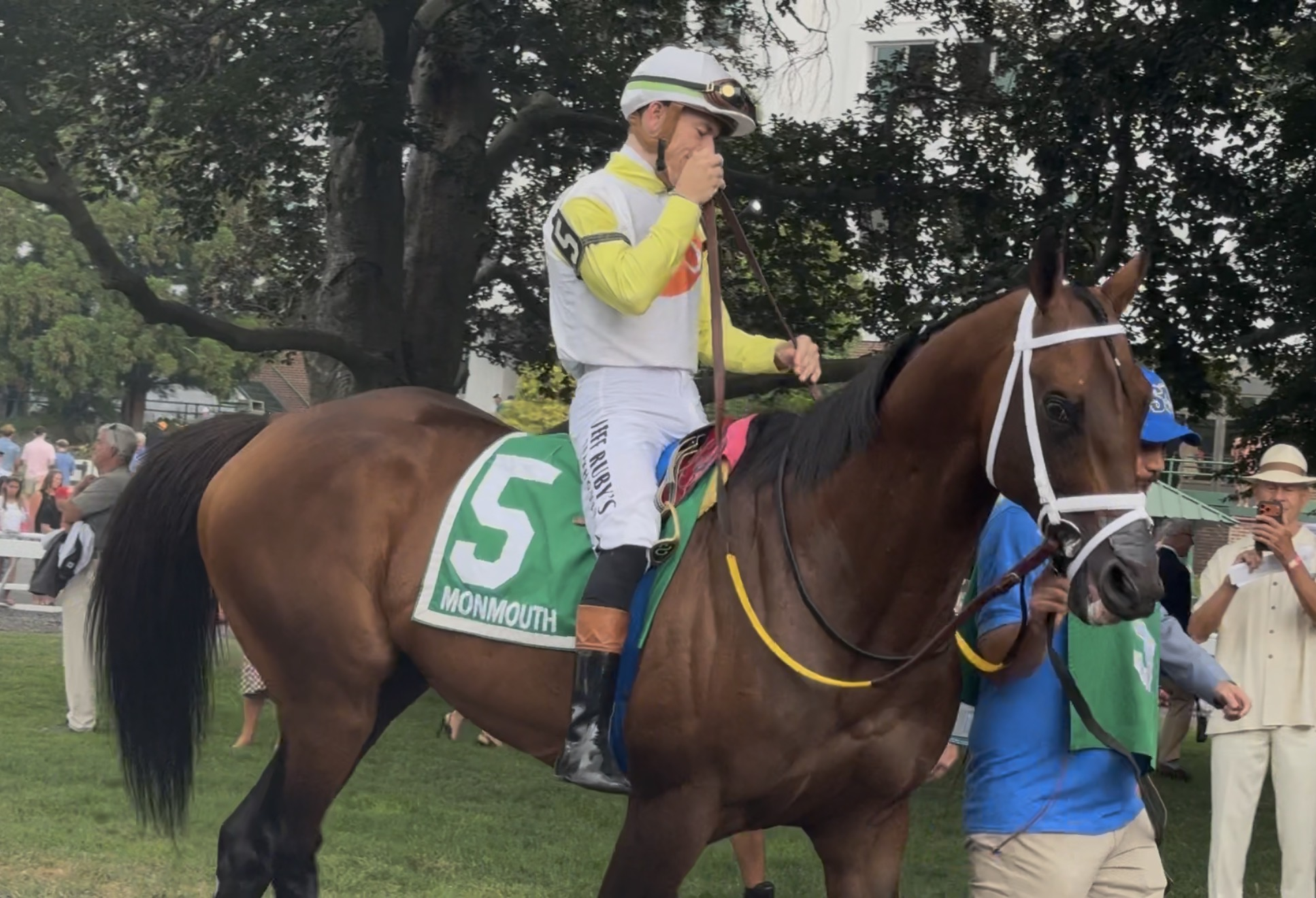
- Sire: Exaggerator
- Dam: Twinkling
- Damsire: War Chant
- Sex: Stallion
- Foaled: April 2, 2019 (age 7)
- Country: United States
- Color: Bay
- Breeder: Brushy Hill, LLC
- Owner: Daniel Alonso
- Trainer: Saffie A. Joseph, Jr.
- Record: 39: 14 - 4 - 8
- Earnings: $5,893,650

Major wins
- West Virginia Derby (2022); Harlan's Holiday Stakes (2022, 2025); Charles Town Classic (2023, 2024); Challenger Stakes (2023, 2024, 2025); Oaklawn Handicap (2024); Hollywood Gold Cup (2025); Pegasus World Cup Invitational Stakes (2026); Essex Handicap (2026)
- Last updated on July 21, 2026

Skippylongstocking (foaled April 2, 2019) is an American Thoroughbred racehorse. He is best known for winning the Grade 1 Pegasus World Cup Invitational in 2026.

== Background ==
Skippylongstocking is a bay horse bred by Brushy Hill, LLC. He is sired by Exaggerator, out of a War Chant mare named Twinkling. Skippylongstocking was sold as a yearling at the 2021 Spring Sale of Two-Year-Olds in Training for $37,000 to Daniel Alonso.

== Racing career ==
=== 2021: Two-year-old season ===
Skippylongstocking started his career at Gulfstream Park, breaking his maiden on his third attempt before starting in the Street Sense Stakes, where he finished fourth. By placing 3rd in a December allowance race at Gulfstream, he finished his juvenile campaign with a 1-1-1-2 record in five starts.

=== 2022: Three-year-old season ===
During Skippylongstocking's three-year-old season, he won the Harlan's Holiday Stakes and the West Virginia Derby, along with third-place efforts in the Wood Memorial and Belmont Stakes. For the season, his record was 3-0-2-1 in nine starts, with $724,310 total earnings.

=== 2023: Four-year-old season ===
With six graded-stakes starts, Skippylongstocking went 2–1–1, with wins in the Challenger Stakes and Charles Town Classic, 2nd in the Cornhusker Handicap, and 3rd in the Breeders' Cup Dirt Mile for $816,375 in total earnings.

=== 2024: Five-year-old season ===
Skippylongstocking started his five-year old season with a DNF in the Pegasus World Cup, albeit walking off. He returned two months later with a repeat win in the Challenger Stakes followed by a win in the Oaklawn Handicap; marking his first time winning two stakes in a row. He placed 3rd in the Stephen Foster and 5th in the Whitney before a repeat victory in the Charles Town Classic. In his last two starts, he placed 2nd in the Woodward Stakes and 6th in the Breeders' Cup Dirt Mile, finishing with a 3–1–1 record in 8 graded-stakes starts and $1,498,800 in total earnings.

=== 2025: Six-year-old season ===
Skippylongstocking's six-year-old campaign was highlighted by a 3-peat win in the Challenger Stakes and capturing the Hollywood Gold Cup. Although he was unable to defend his Charles Town Classic title, he won his second Harlan's Holiday Stakes to finish the season 3-0-2 in seven graded-stakes starts with $682,265 in total earnings.

=== 2026: Seven-year-old season ===
Skippylongstocking tallied his first Grade 1 in the 2026 Pegasus World Cup, his fourth consecutive start in the race. The win gave him at least one victory in every stakes grade. In March, he won the Essex Handicap and became the eighth horse to win both the Essex and Oaklawn handicaps (albeit in different years).

== Pedigree ==
Pedigree of Skippylongstocking
Sire Exaggerator 2013 dk. b.	Curlin; 2004 ch.	Smart Strike	Mr. Prospector
Sire Exaggerator 2013 dk. b.	Curlin; 2004 ch.	Smart Strike	Classy 'n Smart
Sire Exaggerator 2013 dk. b.	Curlin; 2004 ch.	Sherriff's Deputy	Deputy Minister
Sire Exaggerator 2013 dk. b.	Curlin; 2004 ch.	Sherriff's Deputy	Barbarika
Sire Exaggerator 2013 dk. b.	Dawn Raid; 2005 dk. b.	Vindication	Seattle Slew
Sire Exaggerator 2013 dk. b.	Dawn Raid; 2005 dk. b.	Vindication	Strawberry Reason
Sire Exaggerator 2013 dk. b.	Dawn Raid; 2005 dk. b.	Embur Sunshine	Bold Ruckus
Sire Exaggerator 2013 dk. b.	Dawn Raid; 2005 dk. b.	Embur Sunshine	Vevila
Dam Twinkling 2013 dk. b.	War Chant; 1997 dk. b.	Danzig	Northern Dancer
Dam Twinkling 2013 dk. b.	War Chant; 1997 dk. b.	Danzig	Pas de Nom
Dam Twinkling 2013 dk. b.	War Chant; 1997 dk. b.	Hollywood Wildcat	Kris S.
Dam Twinkling 2013 dk. b.	War Chant; 1997 dk. b.	Hollywood Wildcat	Miss Wildcatter
Dam Twinkling 2013 dk. b.	Unhurried; 2000 dk. b.	Out of Place	Cox's Ridge
Dam Twinkling 2013 dk. b.	Unhurried; 2000 dk. b.	Out of Place	Arabian Dancer
Dam Twinkling 2013 dk. b.	Unhurried; 2000 dk. b.	Laughing Erin	Irish Castle
Dam Twinkling 2013 dk. b.	Unhurried; 2000 dk. b.	Laughing Erin	Cricket Club
