= Rutledge Farm =

Grand Prix and hunter/jumper facility, in Middleburg, Virginia

Coordinates: 38°59′9.2″N 77°41′32.4″W

Rutledge Farm silks

Historic Rutledge Farm is a Grand Prix and hunter/jumper facility, in Middleburg, Virginia, owned by Rutledge Farm, LLC (Aleco Bravo-Greenberg and Mrs. Hermen Greenberg).

Built in 1740, it was most recently owned by Aleco's late step-father, Mr. Hermen Greenberg, who had built it into a world-class Thoroughbred breeding operation.

== Main House ==
The Main House was built in 1740 and was preceded by a log cabin. The original logs are still used as overhead beams in the Main House's basement. An addition was built in 1820.

== Rutledge Farm sessions clinic series ==
2021 was shortened by COVID-19, and Rutledge brought in one show hunter champion. The other slated Olympic medalists were rescheduled for 2022.

- Louise Serio - May 15, 2021

2020 was shortened by COVID-19, and Rutledge brought in one show hunter champion and one two-time Olympic silver medalist. The other slated Olympic medalists were rescheduled for 2021.

- Sandy Ferrell - November 7, 2020
- Anne Kursinski - November 21, 2020
- Boyd Martin - Virtual Clinic

2019 expanded the Rutledge Farm sessions to include Olympic medalists and international champions, from jumping, eventing, dressage, and equitation.

- Peter Wylde - June 3, 2019
- Boyd Martin - August 10, 2019
- Debbie McDonald - September 14 & 15
- Will Simpson - October 12
- Allison Brock - October 19 & 20
- Phillip Dutton - October 26
- Stacia Madden - November 9 & 10

2018 featured four Olympic gold medalists.

- McLain Ward - June 6, 2018
- Will Simpson - August 7 & 8, 2018
- Phillip Dutton - October 10, 2018
- Leslie Burr-Howard - November 17, 2018

2017 Rutledge Farm inaugurated its high-performance clinic series, with an Olympic gold medalist jumper.

- Will Simpson - August 30, 2017

== Thoroughbred winners ==
=== Colonial Affair ===
Bred Colonial Affair, who won the 1993 Belmont, carrying Julie Krone.

Trained by the 1992 U.S. Racing Hall of Fame inductee, Scotty Schulhofer, Colonial Affair is best known for his win in the 1993 Belmont Stakes, as the 13-1 longshot. Colonial Affair's 1993 Belmont triumph is also in the record books, because it was the first time that any female jockey (Julie Krone) won any of the three races of the Triple Crown of Thoroughbred Racing.

Colonial Affair went on to win other major races, including the Peter Pan Stakes (1993), the Whitney Handicap (1994), the Jockey Club Gold Cup (1994), and the Excelsior Breeders' Cup Handicap (1994).

Colonial Affair was also only 3 votes shy (out of a possible 247) of winning the 1994 Eclipse Award for American Male Champion Older Horse.

=== Sur La Tete ===
Bred Sur La Tete, a steeplechase star, who won eight stakes races between 2003 and 2006, and who was also a finalist for the 2004, 2005, and 2006 Eclipse Award Steeplechase Horse of the Year.

Sur La Tete retired in 2007, as the fourth-leading earner in the history of the National Steeplechase Association.

Purchased and raced by Kinross Farm, Sur La Tete retired with $664,050 in steeplechase earnings and nine victories, including six Grade 1 wins. Other significant "in the money" finishes included two Grade 2 second-place finishes, three Grade 3 third-place finishes, and one Grade 3 win.

=== Researcher ===
Purchased Researcher, as a baby, for only $2,500. Winner of the April 18, 2009, first annual Charles Town Classic, at 1 1/8 miles, for horses four years old and older. Rutledge Farm continued racing him until April 16, 2010, when Mr. Greenberg's estate sold him to Mr. Zohar Ben-Dov. One day later, April 17, 2010, Researcher won the second annual Charles Town Classic.

On March 28, 2009, shortly before his 2009 Charles Town Classic win, on the same track, and at the same 1 1/8 mile distance, Researcher set a new track record, when he won a race by 22 1/4 lengths.

North America's highest speed figure
Researcher earned a record 133 Equibase Speed Figure in 2009's inaugural Charles Town Classic.
That year, his 133 Speed Figure was higher than any other horse competing in any other 2009 race in North America. (2009 Breeders' Cup Classic champion Zenyatta only scored a 127, and Rachael Alexandra only scored a 121 in both the 2009 Kentucky Oaks and Haskell Invitational.)
No horse, in 2010, 2009, 2008, 2007, or 2006, has run a faster Equibase Speed Figure.

One of North America's leading money earners
As of April 20, 2010, Researcher's $618,600 earnings for 2010, ranks him as North America's 4th leading money earner .

=== Winners in each of the first three Charles Town Classic programs ===
A fun bit of trivia is that "Rutledge Farm has now been represented with a winner as owner or breeder on all three Charles Town Classic programs dating back to 2009."
- Blood Horse, April 19, 2011.
