= Riding for My Life =

1995 autobiography by Julie Krone

- Author: Julie Krone, Nancy Richardson
- Publication date: 1995
- ISBN: 0-316-50477-7

Riding for My Life is an autobiography by horse-racing jockey Julie Krone, with Nancy Richardson. It serves as part of the basis for the film The Boys Club.

== Plot ==
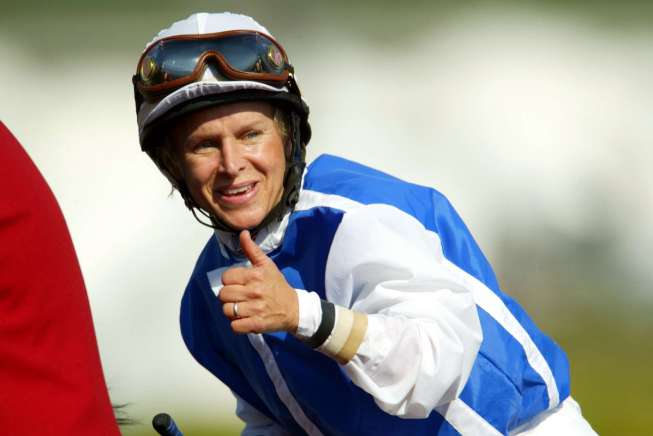
Julie Krone, Santa Anita. After winning the Breeders' Cup Juvenile Fillies on Halfbridled.

Julie Krone is a female horse racing jockey. By age 25, Julie was the first woman ever to win a riding title at a major track, the first woman to win five races in one day at a New York track, and one of three jockeys ever to win six races on one card. In 1993, she became the first female winner of a Triple Crown race, riding 14-to-1 long-shot Colonial Affair to victory in the Belmont Stakes—"showing the patience, intelligence and tactical savvy that have made her one of the nation's leading performers," wrote William Nack of Sports Illustrated.

By the time Krone retired in 1999, she had won 3,545 races and more than $81 million in purse earnings.

== First edition ==
- Little Brown & Co, 1995. ISBN 0-316-50477-7

== Film adaptation ==
The Boys Club is a film adaptation of Julie Krone's biography, Riding for My Life. A movie focused on the world of horse racing, The Boys Club explores one woman's battle against sexual inequality and toward victory. It is based on the true story of Julie Krone's rise to fame and success as a horse racing jockey. The film is written by filmmaker Katherine Brooks, and will be produced by Sophie Watts and executive produced by John Manulis. The film project was retitled as "freak".

=== Production ===
The Boys Club is, as of 2024, unreleased.

== See also ==
- Katherine Brooks
- U.S. National Museum of Racing and Hall of Fame
- Thoroughbred horse racing
