= Society (horse) =

American-bred Thoroughbred racehorse

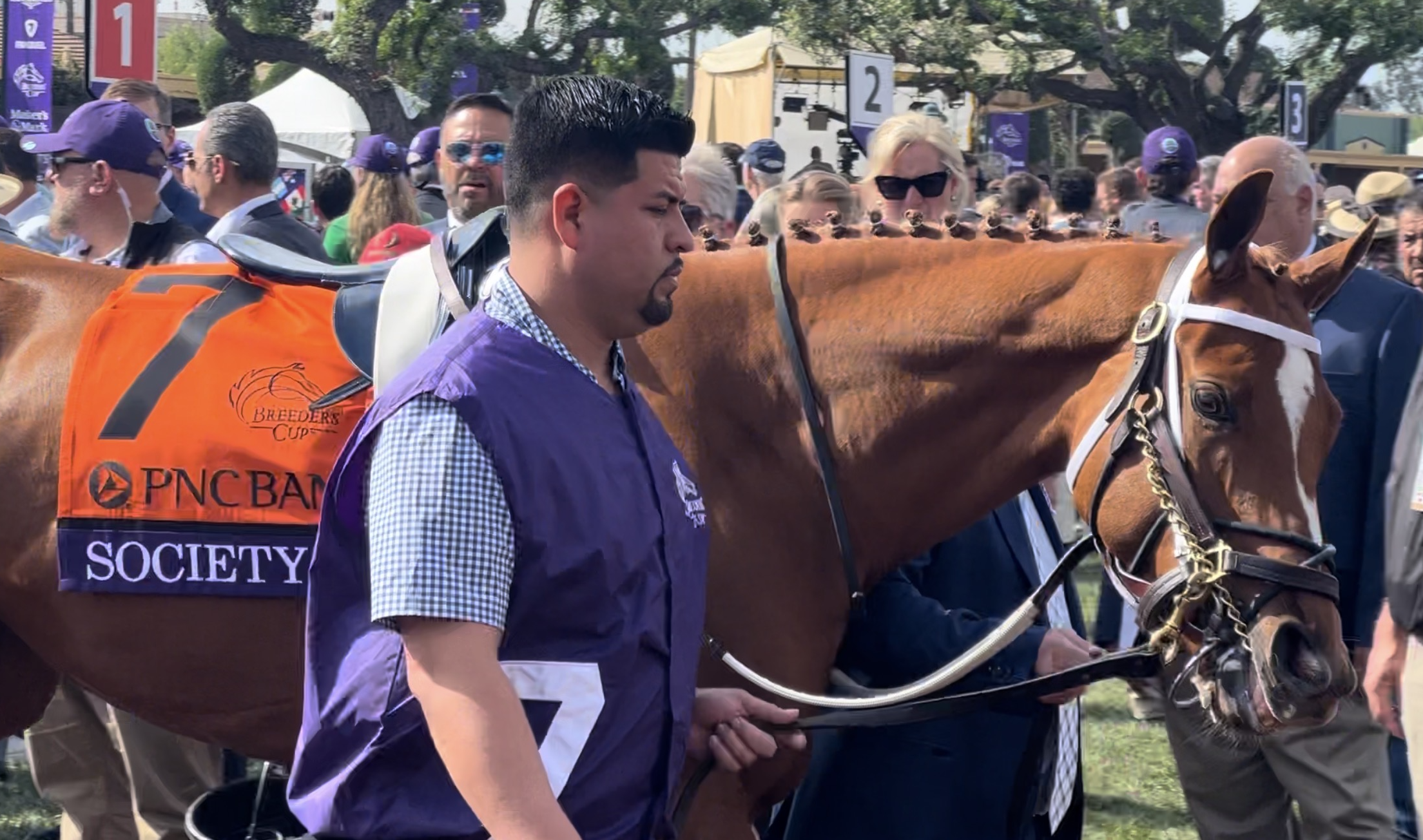
- Sire: Gun Runner
- Grandsire: Candy Ride (ARG)
- Dam: Etiquette
- Damsire: Tapit
- Sex: Mare
- Foaled: April 12, 2019
- Country: United States
- Color: Chestnut
- Breeder: Peter E. Blum Thoroughbreds
- Owner: Peter E. Blum Thoroughbreds
- Trainer: Steven M. Asmussen
- Record: 14: 8 - 0 - 2
- Earnings: $1,839,535

Major wins
- Charles Town Oaks (2022); Cotillion Stakes (2022); Chicago Stakes (2023); Ballerina Handicap (2024)
- Last updated on 25 August 2024

Society (foaled April 12, 2019) is a multiple Grade I American Thoroughbred racehorse who has as a three-year-old won the Grade I Cotillion Stakes at Parx Racing and as a five-year-old the Ballerina Handicap at Saratoga Race Course.

== Background ==
Society is a chestnut mare that was bred in Kentucky by Peter E. Blum Thoroughbreds. Her sire is Gun Runner, the 2017 American Horse of the Year and stands at Three Chimneys Farm. Society became the sixth grade 1 winner, and fourth grade 1 winner in 2022 for Gun Runner in his second-crop. Her dam is Etiquette who was also bred by Peter Blum, is a daughter of Tapit and is a half sister to Pleasant Prince who won the Grade III Ohio Derby and was second in the 2010 GI Florida Derby. Her offspring include a filly by Street Sense sold to Windancer Farm for $725,000 at the Keeneland September Yearling Sale. In 2022 Etiquette was covered once again by Gun Runner.

Society is trained by U.S. Racing Hall of Fame trainer Steven M. Asmussen.

== Career ==
=== 2021: Two-year-old season ===
Society began her racing career on October 21 in a Maiden Special Weight event over 6 1/2 furlongs at Keeneland. In a field of ten only one entrant had experience. Starting as a 27/1 longshot bumped Hypersport at the start then chased the early pace. Racing in the three path along the turn, was in the four path into the straight, rallied down the stretch, passing Hypersport and cleared in the final stages to win by a margin of a length in a time of 1:17.73. Society only had the one start in 2021.

=== 2022: Three-year-old season ===
Society had a long spell of over 6 months and did not begin here three-year-old season until May 6. Returning in an Allowance Optional Claiming at Churchill Downs over 6 1/2 furlongs Society came out from the gate and soon went to the front. She was challenged by Ontheonesandtwos in the stretch run but repelled the challenge and moved ahead to win 1 3/4 lengths in a time of 1:16.89.

On June 16 Society ran at Churchill Downs in the Monomoy Girl Overnight Stakes over a longer distance of 1 1/16 miles which attracted a small field of five. Society started as the 7/10 odds-on favorite again moved to the lead shortly after the start. With 1/2 mile to run Society withstood Miss Yearwood's advances and held to win by 1/2 a length in a time of 1:45.05.

Connections decided to challenge the best three-year-old fillies and on July 23 entered Society in the Grade 1 Coaching Club American Oaks at Saratoga Race Course. This event attracted Grade 1 Kentucky Oaks winner Secret Oath and Nest winner of the Grade 1 Ashland Stakes and runner-up in the Kentucky Oaks. Unfortunately, Society stumbled at the start and never recovered finishing a distant fourth to Nest.

Five weeks later, Society ran in the Grade 2 Charles Town Oaks over a shorter distance of 7 furlongs. Society started as the 7/5 favorite pressed by Louisiana-bred star Free Like a Girl through a :23.28 first quarter and :46.54 half-mile. Society found a second wind turning for home, opening up four lengths at the top of the stretch winning by a final margin of 6 3/4 lengths in a stakes record time of 1:23.42. Jockey Tyler Gaffalione spoke to TVG after the race, "Society is naturally very fast and I just didn't want to get in her way. The first time I rode her going two turns (Coaching Club American Oaks) I got into a bit of a fight with her and she didn't finish up with me that well that day. So I learned from my mistakes. She's a very talented filly."

On September 24 Society entered the Grade 1 Cotillion Stakes at Parx Racing. In the field of nine entrants Society was made the 8/1 fourth choice. Society started well and moved to the lead unchallenged with an opening quarter in :23.33 and half-mile in :46.75. Heading into the turn for home, jockey Florent Geroux widened Society's lead with little effort to six lengths, hitting the six-furlong marker in 1:10.93 and finishing in 1:42.94, 5 3/4 lengths in front of longshot Morning Matcha with Secret Oath in third. Florent Geroux commented after the race, "I know if I kept her relaxed (I would win)."

On November 5 in the Breeders' Cup Distaff Society started slightly over 9/2 as third choice. Society led early but she was no match for Malathaat who won in a three-way photo finish with Blue Stripe and Clairiere finishing third.

== Statistics ==
Date	Distance	Race	Grade	Track	Odds	Field	Finish	Winning Time	Winning (Losing) Margin	Jockey	Ref
2021 – Two-year-old season
Oct 21, 2021	6 1/2 furlongs	Maiden Special Weight		Keeneland	27.80	10	1	1:17.73	1 length	Julie Burke	
2022 – Three-year-old season
May 6, 2022	6 1/2 furlongs	Allowance Optional Claiming		Churchill Downs	3.90	11	1	1:16.89	1 3/4 lengths	Joel Rosario	
Jun 18, 2022	1 1/16 miles	Monomoy Girl Overnight Stakes		Churchill Downs	0.70*	5	1	1:44.16	1/2 lengths	Tyler Gaffalione	
Jul 23, 2022	1 1/8 miles	Coaching Club American Oaks	I	Saratoga	7.40	5	4	1:51.04	(17 3/4 lengths)	Tyler Gaffalione	
Aug 26, 2022	7 furlongs	Charles Town Oaks	III	Charles Town	1.40*	8	1	1:23.42 (Note: Society set a new stakes record time for the Charles Town Oaks)	6 3/4 lengths	Tyler Gaffalione	
Sep 24, 2022	1 1/16 miles	Cotillion Stakes	I	Parx Racing	7.80	9	1	1:42.94	5 3/4 lengths	Florent Geroux	
Nov 5, 2022	1 1/8 miles	Breeders' Cup Distaff	I	Keeneland	4.71	8	7	1:49.07	(17 3/4 lengths)	Florent Geroux	
2023 – four-year-old season
April 8, 2023	7 furlongs	Madison Stakes	I	Keeneland	4.57	5	3	1:23.12	(5 1/4 lengths)	Florent Geroux	
May 5, 2023	1 1/16 miles	La Troienne Stakes	I	Churchill Downs	5.18*	10	9	1:42.48	(16 1/2 lengths)	Jose Ortiz	
Jun 24, 2023	7 furlongs	Chicago Stakes	III	Ellis Park	2.19	6	1	1:20.54 (Note: Society set a new track record at Ellis Park Race Course for the seven furlongs)	10 3/4 lengths	Tyler Gaffalione	
Aug 25, 2023	7 furlongs	Misty Bennett Pink Ribbon Stakes		Charles Town	0.20*	5	1	1:23.11	5 1/2 lengths	Tyler Gaffalione	
Nov 4, 2023	7 furlongs	Breeders' Cup Filly & Mare Sprint	I	Santa Anita	2.20	9	4	1:22.97	(4 1/2 lengths)	Tyler Gaffalione	
2024 – five-year-old season
Jun 22, 2024	7 furlongs	Chicago Stakes	III	Churchill Downs	2.10	5	3	1:21.01	(1 1/4 lengths)	Tyler Gaffalione	
Aug 24, 2024	7 furlongs	Ballerina Handicap	I	Saratoga	3.70	7	1	1:22.00	3 1/4 lengths	Tyler Gaffalione	

An (*) asterisk after the odds means Society was the post-time favorite.

== Pedigree ==
Pedigree of Society, chestnut filly, April 12, 2019
Sire Gun Runner (2013)	Candy Ride (ARG) (1999)	Ride the Rails (1991)	Cryptoclearance (1984)
Sire Gun Runner (2013)	Candy Ride (ARG) (1999)	Ride the Rails (1991)	Herbalesian (1969)
Sire Gun Runner (2013)	Candy Ride (ARG) (1999)	Candy Girl (ARG) (1990)	Candy Stripes (1982)
Sire Gun Runner (2013)	Candy Ride (ARG) (1999)	Candy Girl (ARG) (1990)	City Girl (ARG) (1982)
Sire Gun Runner (2013)	Quiet Giant (2007)	Giant's Causeway (1997)	Storm Cat (1983)
Sire Gun Runner (2013)	Quiet Giant (2007)	Giant's Causeway (1997)	Mariah's Storm (1991)
Sire Gun Runner (2013)	Quiet Giant (2007)	Quiet Dance (1993)	Quiet American (1986)
Sire Gun Runner (2013)	Quiet Giant (2007)	Quiet Dance (1993)	Misty Dancer (1988)
Dam Etiquette (2012)	Tapit (2001)	Pulpit (1994)	A. P. Indy (1989)
Dam Etiquette (2012)	Tapit (2001)	Pulpit (1994)	Preach (1989)
Dam Etiquette (2012)	Tapit (2001)	Tap Your Heels (1996)	Unbridled (1987)
Dam Etiquette (2012)	Tapit (2001)	Tap Your Heels (1996)	Ruby Slippers (1982)
Dam Etiquette (2012)	Archduchess (2002)	Pleasant Tap (1987)	Pleasant Colony (1978)
Dam Etiquette (2012)	Archduchess (2002)	Pleasant Tap (1987)	Never Knock (1979)
Dam Etiquette (2012)	Archduchess (2002)	My Marchesa (1990)	Stately Don (1984)
Dam Etiquette (2012)	Archduchess (2002)	My Marchesa (1990)	Sooni (1970)(family 3-l)
