= Hollywood Casino at Charles Town Races =

Racino in Charles Town, West Virginia, US

Coordinates: 39.2956497°N 77.8486061°W

- Interactive map of Hollywood Casino at Charles Town Races
- Location: Jefferson County, West Virginia, US; 750 Hollywood Drive, Charles Town, WV 25414
- Opened: December 3, 1933
- Theme: Hollywood
- No. of rooms: 153
- Gaming space: 511,249 sq ft (47,496.6 m^{2})
- Signature attractions: The Event Center at Hollywood Casino
- Notable restaurants: Final Cut Steakhouse, 9 Dragons, Barstool Sportsbook, The Eatery
- Casino type: Racino
- Owner: Gaming and Leisure Properties
- Operating license holder: Penn Entertainment
- Previous names: Jefferson County Races, Charles Town Races & Slots
- Website: www.hollywoodcasinocharlestown.com

Hollywood Casino at Charles Town Races is a casino, hotel and Thoroughbred horse racing complex located in Charles Town, West Virginia, 60 miles (97 km) northwest of Washington, D.C. It is owned by Gaming and Leisure Properties and operated by Penn Entertainment.

== History ==
=== Background and development ===
The track opened on December 2, 1933. It was the first horse track to open in West Virginia, following the legalization of parimutuel wagering earlier in the year. It was developed and operated by the Shenandoah Valley Jockey Club, led by Joseph Boyle. It became America's first winter race meet upon its opening. The facility, located on the former grounds of the Charles Town Horse Show, was constructed in two months at a cost of $160,000 (a huge sum during the height of the Great Depression). The developers believed that it would draw large crowds due to it being the only northern track to hold races during the winter season, and they were right. Even with freezing temperatures and odds being calculated by slide rule, the grandstand overflowed. Train service from Baltimore boosted attendance, and the track continued to thrive through World War II.

The facility attracted many notable guests, including J. Edgar Hoover, who was a regular visitor, and John F. Kennedy during his campaign for Presidency.

=== Ownership changes and expansion ===
Shenandoah Corporation purchased the track in 1971 for $6 million. Shenandoah Corporation also owned Shenandoah Downs, which was Charles Town Races only competitor. After the closure of Shenandoah Downs in 1975, year-round racing was moved to Charles Town.

Shenandoah Corporation was acquired in 1977 by Kenton Corporation, which then merged with Rapid-American Corporation in 1981. In 1983, Rapid-American sold the Charles Town track to a group of local businesspersons for approximately $12 million.

During the 1990s, purses fell, leading to dwindling attendance and fewer high-caliber horses. The track's future was in serious doubt, and many observers feared the facility would close for good. Then, during the fall of 1996, voters approved video lottery machines at Charles Town. The track was then sold in early 1997 to a joint venture of Penn National Gaming (now Penn Entertainment) and Bryant Development Company for $16.5 million. The new owners began a $175-million upgrade of the venue. These upgrades included the addition of simulcast racing, numerous dining options, and 3,500 slot machines. Penn National bought out Bryant Development's 11-percent stake in the property in 2000 for $6 million.

West Virginia legislators in 2007 authorized table games at the state's race tracks, subject to a local referendum in each county. Jefferson County voters rejected table games at Charles Town later that year.

A hotel was added to the property in 2008, with 153 rooms.

In 2009, a second referendum was held, and county voters approved table games for Charles Town. Table games were added to the gaming floor in 2010, and Charles Town Races and Slots became Hollywood Casino at Charles Town Races, adopting the Hollywood brand used for several of Penn National's other properties. An event center for live concerts and shows was also added.

Charles Town thrived for years as the closest gambling option for residents of the Washington/Baltimore metropolitan area, until Maryland legalized casinos. Starting in 2012, competition from casinos in the Baltimore area took a heavy toll on Charles Town's business.

== Horse racing ==
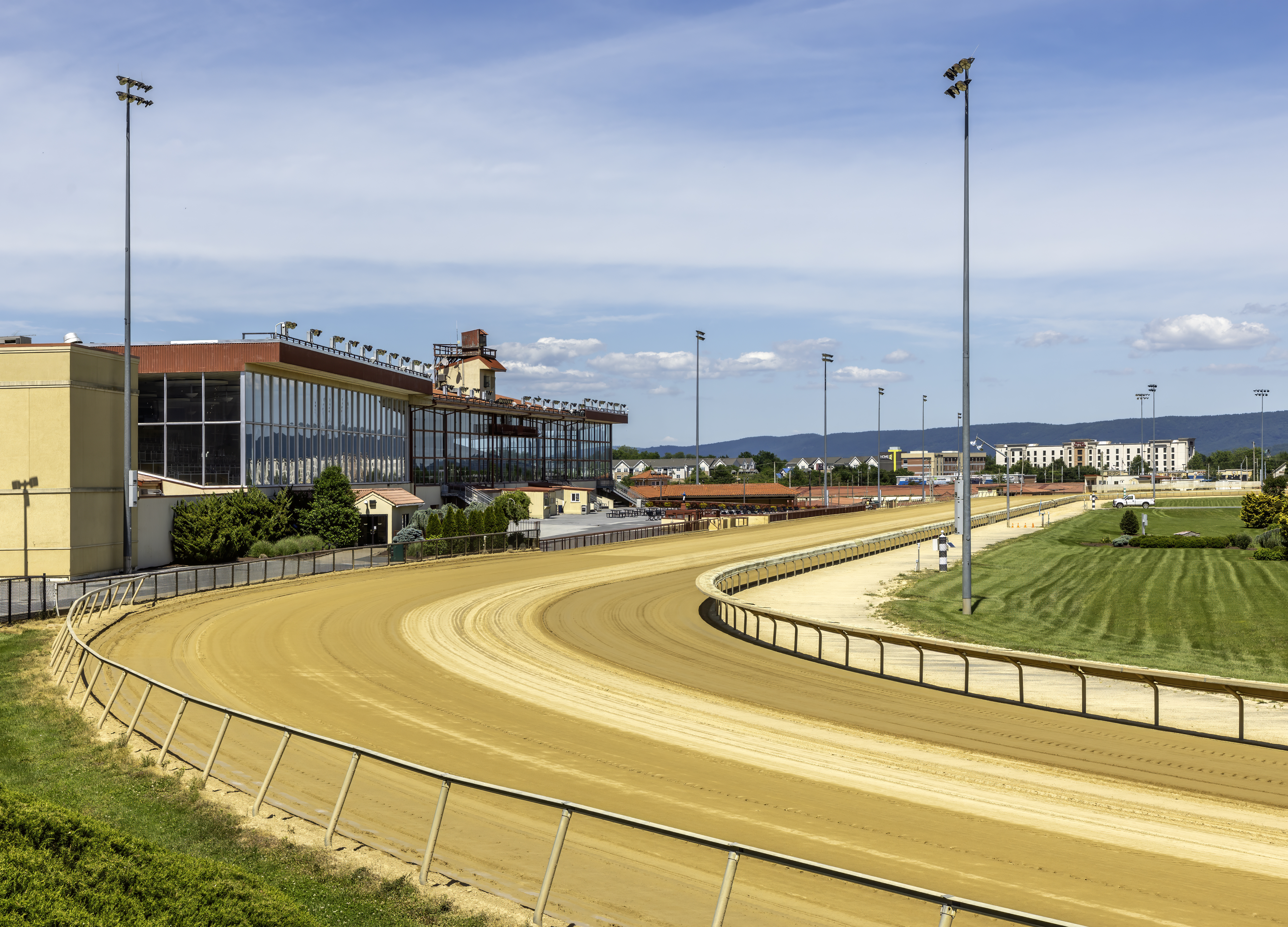
The Charles Town Races racetrack and grandstands in 2025

=== The Sprint Festival ===
In 2008, the track inaugurated The Sprint Festival, four open stakes worth a total of $500,000. These are the 4½ furlong $200,000 Charles Town Invitational Dash for colts and geldings three-years-old and up, the $100,000 Lady Charles Town for 3-year-old fillies at 4½ furlongs, the $100,000 West Virginia Sprint Derby for 3-year-olds at 4½ furlongs, and the $100,000 Red Legend Stakes for 3-year-olds at seven furlongs.

=== West Virginia Breeders' Classics ===
In 1987, NFL Hall of Fame Sam Huff organized the first West Virginia Breeders’ Classics. Local favorite Onion Juice won the inaugural running and the state's first $100,000 purse.

- Biggest race of the day is the $300,000 West Virginia Breeders' Classic.
- Total purses for the day combine for a total $1,000,000.

=== Charles Town Classic ===
In 2009, it inaugurated the Charles Town Classic for older horses running a distance of one and 1/8 mile. The purse was "tiered" and was determined by the graded status of the winner. The purse's range was from between $500,000 and $1,000,000. Researcher won the 1st and 2nd Charles Town Classic races. In 2013, the purse was increased to $1,500,000 with the winner receiving $1,000,000, making the Grade 3 Charles Town Classic one of the richest Thoroughbred race contested in U.S. surpassed only by the Kentucky Derby and Breeders' Cup World Championships. The race has attracted top-class performers including Game On Dude and Shared Belief.

=== Graded events ===
The following Graded events were held at Charles Town Races in 2019.

Grade III

- Charles Town Classic
- Charles Town Oaks

== Other facilities ==
=== Hotel ===
Also on the property is a 153-room hotel, The Inn at Charles Town, and several dining facilities including: a food court, sports bar, fine dining restaurant, and the Skyline Terrace which overlooks the track. However, while a hot buffet breakfast is served at the hotel, the previously mentioned dining facilities are not located in the hotel. The property offers a shuttle between the hotel and casino/racetrack for its patrons.

=== Table games ===
On December 5, 2009, a second referendum was held on table games and this time voters approved the referendum to allow table games at the venue. As of July 2, 2010, the facility, for years known as "Charles Town Races & Slots," was renamed "Hollywood Casino at Charles Town Races".

=== Sports betting ===
On August 30, 2018, sports betting began at Hollywood Casino at Charles Town Races. The casino is the first in West Virginia to offer sports betting.

== See also ==
- List of casinos in West Virginia
- List of casinos in the United States
- List of casino hotels
