= Charles Town Oaks =

Horse race in West Virginia, US

- Class: Grade II
- Location: Hollywood Casino at Charles Town Races; Charles Town, West Virginia
- Inaugurated: 2009
- Race type: Thoroughbred – Flat racing
- Website: Charles Town Races

Race information
- Distance: 7 furlongs
- Surface: Dirt
- Track: Left-handed
- Qualification: Fillies, three years old
- Weight: 123 lbs with allowances
- Purse: $750,000 (2023)

The Charles Town Oaks is a Grade II American Thoroughbred horse race for three year old fillies, over a distance of 7 furlongs on the dirt held annually in August at Hollywood Casino at Charles Town Races in Charles Town, West Virginia. The event currently carries a purse of $750,000.

== History ==
The event was inaugurated in 2009 with stakes of $250,000. With such a purse the race attracted several good fillies and by 2014 the event was classified as a Grade III with $500,000 stakes.

In 2024 the event was upgraded by the Thoroughbred Owners and Breeders Association to a Grade II and the stakes also were increased to $750,000.

== Records ==
Speed record:

- 1:23.42 – Society (2022)

Margins:

- 9 3/4 lengths – Miss Behaviour (2014)

Most wins by a jockey:

- 2 – Fredy Peltroche (2018, 2020)

Most wins by a trainer:

- 3 – Steven M. Asmussen (2009, 2021, 2022)

Most wins by an owner:

- 2 – C2 Racing Stable (2024, 2025)

== Winners ==
| Year | Winner | Jockey | Trainer | Owner | Time | Purse | Grade | Ref |
|---|---|---|---|---|---|---|---|---|
| 2026 | Niche | Dylan Davis | Rob Atras | Red White and Blue Racing LLC | 1:25:36 | $750,000 | II | |
| 2025 | Indy Bay | Irad Ortiz Jr. | Saffie Joseph Jr. | C2 Racing Stable, Paul Braverman & Timothy Pinch | 1:25.82 | $750,000 | II | |
| 2024 | Mystic Lake | Mike E. Smith | Saffie Joseph Jr. | C2 Racing Stable & Stefania Farms | 1:24.18 | $750,000 | II | |
| 2023 | Vahva | John R. Velazquez | Cherie DeVaux | Belladonna Racing, Edward J. Hudson Jr., West Point Thoroughbreds, LBD Stable, Nice Guys Stables, Manganaro Bloodstock, Runnels Racing, Steve Hornstock & Twin Brook Stables | 1:25.01 | $750,000 | III | |
| 2022 | Society | Tyler Gaffalione | Steven M. Asmussen | Peter E. Blum Thoroughbreds | 1:23.42 | $500,440 | III | |
| 2021 | † Pauline's Pearl | Brian Hernandez Jr. | Steven M. Asmussen | Stonestreet Stables | 1:24.37 | $400,000 | III | |
| 2020 | Fly On Angel | Fredy Peltroche | Claudio A. Gonzalez | Joseph E. Besecker | 1:26.15 | $200,000 | III | |
| 2019 | Lady T N T | Juan D. Acosta | Joe Sharp | Scott & Evan Dilworth | 1:25.23 | $300,000 | III | |
| 2018 | Late Night Pow Wow | Fredy Peltroche | Javier Contreras | Javier Contreras | 1:24.37 | $300,000 | III | |
| 2017 | Tequilita | Luis Saez | Michael R. Matz | Dorothy A. Matz | 1:26.01 | $300,000 | III | |
| 2016 | Covey Trace | Arnaldo Bocachica | William J. Denzik Jr | Brook T. Smith & Denzik Thoroughbreds | 1:26.99 | $350,000 | III | |
| 2015 | Hot City Girl | Jose L. Ortiz | Linda L. Rice | Lady Sheila Stable | 1:23.80 | $350,000 | III | |
| 2014 | Miss Behaviour | Jevian Toledo | Phil Schoenthal | Cal MacWilliam & Neil Teitelbaum | 1:24.69 | $500,000 | III | |
| 2013 | So Many Ways | Miguel Mena | Thomas M. Amoss | Maggi Moss | 1:26.62 | $400,000 | Listed | |
| 2012 | Book Review | Javier Castellano | Chad C. Brown | Gary & Mary West | 1:24.65 | $400,000 | Listed | |
| 2011 | Strike the Moon | Julian Pimentel | Michael J. Trombetta | R. Larry Johnson | 1:24.64 | $400,000 | Listed | |
| 2010 | Derwin's Star | Kendrick Carmouche | Steve Klesaris | Puglisi Racing & Steve Klesaris | 1:24.82 | $400,000 | Listed | |
| 2009 | Four Gifts | Robby Albarado | Steven M. Asmussen | Heiligbrodt Racing Stables | 1:24.82 | $250,000 | Listed | |

Notes:
† In the 2021 running of the event R Adios Jersey was first past the post and wagering was paid out as the winner, however the horse returned a positive after tests showed the presence of flunixin in her system and consequently was disqualified from the prizemoney and was placed tenth (last). Pauline's Pearl was declared the official winner of the event.

== See also ==
List of American and Canadian Graded races
