= West Virginia Breeders' Classic =

West Virginia Breeders Classic
- Class: Restricted
- Location: Charles Town Races & Slots; Charles Town, West Virginia, United States
- Inaugurated: 1987
- Race type: Thoroughbred - Flat racing
- Website: West Virginia Breeders Classic

Race information
- Distance: 1 1/8 miles (9.0 furlongs)
- Surface: Dirt
- Track: Left-handed
- Qualification: Three-years-old and up
- Weight: Weight-For-Age
- Purse: $500,000

The West Virginia Breeders Classic is a thoroughbred horse race for West Virginia breeds run at a distance of one and one/eighth mile on the dirt. Open to three-year-olds and up, it takes place each year at the Charles Town Races in Charles Town, West Virginia, and currently offers a purse of $500,000. Along with this race are eight other West Virginia Breeders’ races on the same day for West Virginia-bred horses.

In its 29th running as of 2015, the West Virginia Classic and its complement of similar races was created in 1987 by retired Washington Redskins and New York Giants football great Sam Huff. Huff owns thoroughbreds and was born in West Virginia.

In 2014, Russell Road won his third West Virginia Classic, aged 8.

== Past winners ==
- 2015 - Charitable Annuity (Christian Hiraldo)
- 2014 - Russell Road (Jose Montano)
- 2013 - Fred High (Wesley Ho) (Russell Road placed)
- 2012 - Lucy's Bob Boy (Gustavo Larrosa)
- 2011 - Russell Road (Luis Perez)
- 2010 - Sea Rescue
- 2009 - Russell Road
- 2008 - Ghostly Thunder (Travis Dunkelberger) (Eastern Delite, placed)
- 2007 - Eastern Delite (Oscar Flores)
- 2006 - Speed Whiz (Anthony Mawing)
- 2005 - Speed Whiz (Anthony Mawing)
- 2004 - A Huevo (Ramon Dominguez) •
- 2003 - Cape Power (Anthony Mawing)
- 2002 - Confucius Say (Larry Reynolds)
- 2001 - Confucius Say (Larry Reynolds)
- 2000 - Coolmars
- 1999 - Rebellious Dreamer
- 1997 - Take Aim
- 1996 - Ardent Arab
- 1995 - Cavada (filly)
- 1994 - EBF Express
- 1993 - Coin Collector

Owner Mark Hopkins's A Huevo, trained by Michael Dickinson, was disqualified from first and placed last in the 1999 edition of the race after a post-race test revealed traces of clenbuterol. Wind N'Springs Farms Eastern Delite, trained by Freddie Johnson was also disqualified from first and placed last in the 2002 race, after the post-race test revealed a positive for caffeine. However, 2nd place finisher Confucius Say was not awarded the purse for some time, due to litigation. The ruling was upheld, allowing two-time winner of this race, both times ridden by Larry C. Reynolds, Confucius Say to surpass the $1 million plateau in earnings.
