= Chicago Stakes =

American horse race

- Class: Grade II
- Location: Churchill Downs; Louisville, Kentucky, United States
- Inaugurated: 1986 (as Chicago-Budweiser Breeders' Cup Handicap at Arlington Park)
- Race type: Thoroughbred - Flat racing

Race information
- Distance: 7 furlongs
- Surface: Dirt
- Track: Left-handed
- Qualification: Fillies and Mares, four-years-old and older
- Weight: 123 lbs with allowances
- Purse: $300,000 (2025)

The Chicago Stakes is a Grade II American Thoroughbred horse race for fillies and mares, four years old and older over a distance of seven furlongs on the dirt track scheduled annually in June at run annually at Churchill Downs in Louisville, Kentucky. The event currently offers a purse of $300,000 plus a trophy.

== History ==
The inaugural running of the event was on 31 August 1986, as the Chicago-Budweiser Breeders' Cup Handicap, the seventh event on the card for Budweiser-Arlington Million Day and was won by Lazer Show who was ridden by US Hall of Fame jockey Pat Day in a time of 1:21 2/5. Between 1986 and 1995 Budweiser sponsored the event and from 1986 and 2006 the Breeders' Cup sponsored the event which reflected in the name of the event. Lazer Show would win the event again the following year.

In 1992 the event was upgraded by the American Graded Stakes Committee of the Thoroughbred Owners and Breeders Association to Grade III status.

In 2007, the race was moved to a synthetic surface when Arlington Park switched its main track from dirt to an all-weather course. The Chicago Handicap was switched back to dirt in 2017, when it was moved to Churchill Downs in Louisville, Kentucky. Arlington Park was cutting back on its stakes races in order to boost overnight race purses, and Churchill Downs, which is owned by the same company, picked up both the Chicago Handicap and the Matron Stakes.

In 2018 the event returned to Arlington Park with Princess La Quinta winning the race.

The event was not held in 1988, 1998, 1999 and 2015. In 2020 due to the COVID-19 pandemic in the United States, Arlington Park did not schedule the event in its shortened meeting.

In 2021 the event was scheduled as a stakes allowance event, hence the event was changed to the Chicago Stakes.

In 2022, the event was moved to Churchill Downs after the closure of Arlington Park in Arlington Heights, Illinois. Also the conditions of the event were changed so that only mares four years old or older could enter. In 2023 the event was moved to Ellis Park after Churchill Downs closed their spring meeting earlier due to a spate of injuries.

In 2025 the event was upgraded to Grade II by the Thoroughbred Owners and Breeders Association.

== Records ==
Speed Record:

- 1:20.54 - Society (2023)

Margins:

- 10 1/2 lengths - Society (2023)

Most wins by an owner:

- 2 - James J. Devaney (1986, 1987)
- 2 - Edward P. Evans (1992, 1994)
- 2 - Knob Hill Stable (2006, 2011)
- 2 - Augustin Stable (2009, 2010)
- 2 - Belladonna Racing, Lynne & Edward J. Hudson Jr., West Point,
  Nice Guys Stables, Twin Brook Stables, Steve Hornstock,
  LBD Stable, Manganaro Bloodstock & Runnels Racing (2024, 2025)

Most wins:

- 2 - Lazer Show (1986, 1987)
- 2 - Informed Decision (2009, 2010)
- 2 - Vahva (2024, 2025)

Most wins by a trainer:

- 2 - Donald R. Winfree (1986, 1987)
- 2 - Frank L. Brothers (1989, 2001)
- 2 - D. Wayne Lukas (1992, 1995)
- 2 - Phillip England (1996, 2000)
- 2 - William I. Mott (2006, 2011)
- 2 - Jonathan E. Sheppard (2009, 2010)
- 2 - W. Bret Calhoun (2013, 2017)
- 2 - Cherie DeVaux (2024, 2025)

Most wins by a jockey:

- 3 - Pat Day (1986, 1987, 1990)
- 3 - Craig Perret (1991, 2001, 2003)
- 3 - Rene R. Douglas (2002, 2004, 2008)
- 3 - Irad Ortiz Jr. (2024, 2025, 2026)

== Winners ==
Year	Winner	Age	Jockey	Trainer	Owner	Distance	Time	Purse	Grade	Ref
At Churchill Downs – Chicago Stakes
2026	Eclatant	4	Irad Ortiz Jr.	Brad H. Cox	Stonestreet Stables	7 furlongs	1:22.62	$300,000	II	
2025	Vahva	5	Irad Ortiz Jr.	Cherie DeVaux	Belladonna Racing, Lynne & Edward J. Hudson Jr., West Point, Nice Guys Stables, Twin Brook Stables, Steve Hornstock, LBD Stable, Manganaro Bloodstock & Runnels Racing	7 furlongs	1:20.89	$298,250	II	
2024	Vahva	4	Irad Ortiz Jr.	Cherie DeVaux	Belladonna Racing, Lynne & Edward J. Hudson Jr., West Point, Nice Guys Stables, Twin Brook Stables, Steve Hornstock, LBD Stable, Manganaro Bloodstock & Runnels Racing	7 furlongs	1:21.01	$249,500	III	
At Ellis Park
2023	Society	4	Tyler Gaffalione	Steven M. Asmussen	Peter E. Blum Thoroughbreds	7 furlongs	1:20.54	$225,000	III	
At Churchill Downs
2022	Lady Rocket	5	Ricardo Santana Jr.	Brad H. Cox	Frank Fletcher Racing Operations	7 furlongs	1:21.62	$200,000	III	
At Arlington Park
2021	Abby Hatcher (IRE)	4	Alex Achard	Anna Meah	David Meah	7 furlongs	1:22.27	$100,000	III	
2020	Race not held									
Chicago Handicap
2019	My Mertie	4	Carlos H. Marquez Jr.	Michele Boyce	Oak Rock Racing, Terry Biondo & Cherrywood Racing Stables II	7 furlongs	1:22.44	$100,000	III	
2018	Hotshot Anna	4	Harry Hernandez	Hugh H. Robertson	Hugh H. Robertson	7 furlongs	1:20.93	$100,000	III	
At Churchill Downs
2017	Finley'sluckycharm	4	Brian Hernandez Jr.	W. Bret Calhoun	Carl L. Moore Management	7 furlongs	1:22.17	$100,000	III	
At Arlington Park
2016	Sarah Sis	4	Jose Valdivia Jr.	Ingrid Mason	Rags Racing Stable	7 furlongs	1:23.16	$100,000	III	
2015	Race not held									
2014	My Option	4	Eduardo E. Perez	Chris M. Block	Timothy J. Keeley	7 furlongs	1:23.72	$150,000	III	
2013	Cozze Up Lady	4	Miguel Mena	W. Bret Calhoun	Martin Racing, Morgan Thoroughbred, Westwind Property & Farfellow Farm	7 furlongs	1:23.06	$150,000	III	
2012	Kitty in a Tizzy	5	Francisco C. Torres	H. James Bond	William L. Clifton Jr.	7 furlongs	1:23.49	$150,000	III	
2011	Devil by Design	5	Corey Nakatani	William I. Mott	John D. Gunther, Eurowest Bloodstock & Tony Chedraoui	7 furlongs	1:25.54	$100,000	III	
2010	Informed Decision	5	Julien R. Leparoux	Jonathan E. Sheppard	Augustin Stable	7 furlongs	1:24.34	$100,000	III	
2009	Informed Decision	4	Julien R. Leparoux	Jonathan E. Sheppard	Augustin Stable	7 furlongs	1:21.49	$140,000	III	
2008	Leah's Secret	5	Rene R. Douglas	Todd A. Pletcher	WinStar Farm	7 furlongs	1:22.17	$144,500	III	
2007	Lady Belsara	4	Edward T. Baird	S. Matthew Kintz	At the Moment Stables	7 furlongs	1:23.10	$175,000	III	
2006	Ebony Breeze	6	John Jacinto	William I. Mott	Kinsman Stable	7 furlongs	1:22.02	$157,750	III	
2005	Happy Ticket	4	Eusebio Razo Jr.	Andrew Leggio Jr.	Stewart Mather Madison	7 furlongs	1:22.54	$175,000	III	
2004	My Trusty Cat	4	Rene R. Douglas	David R. Vance	Carl F. Pollard	7 furlongs	1:23.54	$175,000	III	
2003	For Rubies	4	Craig Perret	Lynn S. Whiting	Choctaw Racing Stable	7 furlongs	1:24.21	$145,750	III	
2002	Mandy's Gold	4	Rene R. Douglas	Michael E. Gorham	Steeplechase Farm	7 furlongs	1:22.86	$164,440	III	
2001	Trip	4	Craig Perret	Frank L. Brothers	Claiborne Farm	7 furlongs	1:22.18	$157,270	III	
2000	Saoirse	4	David Clark	Phillip England	Knob Hill Stable	7 furlongs	1:23.09	$170,325	III	
1998–1999		Race not held								
1997	J J'sdream	4	Mark Guidry	Bobby C. Barnett	John A. Franks	7 furlongs	1:22.25	$169,375	III	
1996	Bunbeg	4	Mickey Walls	Phillip England	Knob Hill Stable	7 furlongs	1:23.86	$171,650	III	
1995	Low Key Affair	4	Aaron Gryder	D. Wayne Lukas	Moyglare Stud	7 furlongs	1:24.64	$156,400	III	
1994	Minidar	4	Vann Belvoir	Mark A. Hennig	Edward P. Evans	7 furlongs	1:22.49	$156,600	III	
1993	Meafara	4	Juvenal Lopez Diaz	Leslie E. Ahrens	Frank L. Muench	7 furlongs	1:22.12	$156,450	III	
1992	Withallprobability	4	Garrett K. Gomez	D. Wayne Lukas	Edward P. Evans	7 furlongs	1:21.24	$155,750	III	
1991	Safely Kept	5	Craig Perret	Alan E. Goldberg	Jayeff B. Stable	7 furlongs	1:23.05	$155,100	Listed	
1990	Fit for a Queen	4	Pat Day	Steven C. Penrod	Hermitage Farm	7 furlongs	1:23.00	$157,750		
1989	Rose's Record	5	Jorge Velasquez	Frank L. Brothers	David V. & Nancy Ringler	7 furlongs	1:24.60	$149,200		
1988	Race not held									
1987	Lazer Show	4	Pat Day	Donald R. Winfree	James J. Devaney	7 furlongs	1:22.80	$77,125		
1986	Lazer Show	3	Pat Day	Donald R. Winfree	James J. Devaney	7 furlongs	1:21.40	$155,600		

Legend:
All Weather Track Dirt

== See also ==
List of American and Canadian Graded races
