= Shenandoah Downs =

Horse racing track in Jefferson County, West Virginia

Coordinates: 39°18′17″N 77°50′47″W

Shenandoah Downs was a five-furlong horse-racing track located just outside the eastern limits of Charles Town, West Virginia, United States, that operated from 1959 through 1975. When it opened it featured night racing, a novelty at the time, initially running harness races. After operations began, the owners asked the West Virginia Racing Commission to allow thoroughbred racing, competing with the day races at adjacent Charles Town Races. Following litigation, the request was granted and the track converted to nighttime flat racing. Nighttime racing followed at Charles Town in 1965 and the adjoining tracks were allotted roughly equal numbers of racing days. In 1972 Charles Town was purchased by the owners of Shenandoah Downs. In 1976 Shenandoah Downs was closed down. In 1978 after both tracks were sold to a new owner, Shenandoah Downs briefly reopened. The Shenandoah Downs track was operated as a training track afterwards, until the site was developed. The grandstand remained until 2006 when it was demolished.

An unrelated track in Woodstock, Virginia by the same name began operations in 2016, running annual harness racing meets, and moving to a two meets a year in 2023.
