= Charles Town Invitational Dash =

Horse race in West Virginia, US

The Charles Town Invitational Dash is an American Thoroughbred horse race run at Charles Town Races & Slots in Charles Town, West Virginia. In 2008, it headlined the Charles Town Races and Slots' inaugural Sprint Festival.

Run at the beginning of summer, the Charles Town Dash is for three-year-olds and upward colts and geldings, and is set at a distance of four and one/half furlongs on the dirt. It offers a purse of $200,000 Guaranteed.

The Sprint or “Speed Festival” is made up of four open stakes worth a total of $500,000. The other three stakes are the $100,000 Lady Charles Town for 3-year-old fillies at 4 1/2 furlongs (won by Grand Obsession, ridden by Jesus Castanon), the $100,000 West Virginia Sprint Derby for 3-year-olds at 4 1/2 furlongs (So So, ridden by Paul Nicol Jr. won the first ever run), and the $100,000 Red Legend Stakes for 3-year-olds at seven furlongs (won by Devereux and ridden Larry Sterling Jr.), which is run around two turns at Charles Town.

== Past winners ==
- 2012 – Immortal Eyes (0:50.50) (Travis L. Dunkelberger)
- 2011 – Major Magic (0:53.04) (O' FLores )
- 2010 – Immortal Eyes (0:50.71) (Kendrick Carmouche)
- 2009 – Trust or Bust (0:51.00)
- 2008 – Joey P. (:50.75) (Travis Dunkelberger) (In the pouring rain)
- 2007 – Confucious Say (1:24.10) (run at 7 furlongs)
