= Charles Town Classic =

Horse race in West Virginia, US

- Class: Grade II
- Location: Hollywood Casino at Charles Town Races; Charles Town, West Virginia
- Inaugurated: 2009
- Race type: Thoroughbred – Flat racing
- Website: Charles Town Races

Race information
- Distance: 1 1/8 miles
- Surface: Dirt
- Track: Right-handed
- Qualification: Three-year-olds and older
- Weight: Base weights with allowances: Older: 123 lbs 3YOs: 121 lbs
- Purse: US$1,000,000 (2022)

The Charles Town Classic is a Grade II American Thoroughbred horse race for horses aged three years old and older over a distance of one and one-eighth miles on the dirt held annually in August at Hollywood Casino at Charles Town Races in Charles Town, West Virginia. The event currently carries a purse of $1,000,000.

== History ==
The event was inaugurated on 18 April 2009 and was won by the second favorite (16/5) Researcher who after taking the lead shortly before entering the stretch run, drawing off to win by a 2 1/4 margin in a time of 1:49.86. In 2009 the stakes distribution was as follows: If the winner had previously won a Grade 1 Stakes Race, then the purse was $1,000,000. If the winner had previously won a Grade 2 Stakes Race, then the purse was $750,000. If the winner had previously won a Grade 3 Stakes Race, then the purse was $600,000. If the winner had never before won a Graded Stakes Race, then the purse was $500,000. The official purse was $615,000. Researcher won the event again the following year. However, Researcher was owned by a new owner, Kinross (Zohar Ben-Dov), only five days before the Classic. He was previously owned by Rutledge Farm, which was owned by the late Hermen Greenberg who had died earlier in the year in February.

With the increased high stakes attributed to the racino the event immediately as attractive for four year old horses and older in the early spring.

In 2011 the event was upgraded by the Thoroughbred Owners and Breeders Association to Grade 3 status. The following year the event was upgraded once more to Grade 2.

Charles Town Track Officials announced a new purse layout for the 2015 running of this race in order to attract the brightest stars in racing. This means that if the winner of the Classic has also won races, there is $500,000 set aside from the purse for their Classic success. For 2015, Shared Belief was shipped in from California and set as the 3-10 odds-on favorite but stumbled badly and was eased by his jockey Mike E. Smith. Moreno, the third favorite went on to win the event and set a new track record in 1:48:81.

Charles Town Track officials announced in December 2015 that the purse for the 2016 running of the Charles Town Classic would be reduced to $1,250,000.

In 2020 due to the COVID-19 pandemic in the United States the event was moved to an August schedule and the conditions were changed to allow three-year-olds to participate.

== Records ==
Speed Record:

- 1:48.81 – Moreno (2015)

Margins:

- 7 1/2 lengths – Sleepy Eyes Todd (2020)

Most Wins:

- 2 – Researcher (2009, 2010)
- 2 – Imperative (2014, 2017)
- 2 – Art Collector (2021, 2022)
- 2 – Skippylongstocking (2023, 2024)

Most wins by a jockey:

- 3 – Javier Castellano (2012, 2016, 2017)

Most wins by a trainer:

- 2 – Jeff C. Runco (2009, 2010)
- 2 – Todd A. Pletcher (2012, 2016)
- 2 – William I. Mott (2021, 2022)
- 2 – Saffie Joseph Jr. (2023, 2024)

Most wins by an owner:

- 2 – Bruce Lunsford (2021, 2022)
- 2 – Daniel Alonso (2023, 2024)

== Winners ==
Year	Winner	Age	Jockey	Trainer	Owner	Time	Purse	Grade	Ref
2026	Willy D's	5	Ricardo Santana, Jr.	Michael J. Maker	Paradise Farms Corporation & Case Chambers	1:50.68	$1,000,000	II	
2025	Banishing	5	Tyler Gaffalione	David Jacobson	Lawrence P. Roman & David Jacobson	1:53.26	$1,000,000	II	
2024	Skippylongstocking	5	Jose L. Ortiz	Saffie Joseph Jr.	Daniel Alonso	1:50.34	$1,000,000	II	
2023	Skippylongstocking	4	Tyler Gaffalione	Saffie Joseph Jr.	Daniel Alonso	1:51.37	$1,000,000	II	
2022	Art Collector	5	Luis Saez	William I. Mott	Bruce Lunsford	1:51.30	$1,000,440	II	
2021	Art Collector	4	Luis Saez	William I. Mott	Bruce Lunsford	1:49.39	$800,000	II	
2020	Sleepy Eyes Todd	4	Carlos J. Delgado	Miguel Angel Silva	Thumbs Up Racing	1:50.82	$600,000	II	
2019	Runnin'toluvya	5	Oscar Flores	Timothy C. Grams	Gram Racing Stables	1:50.56	$1,000,000	II	
2018	Something Awesome	7	Edgar S. Prado	Jose Corrales	Stronach Stables	1:50.84	$1,150,000	II	
2017	Imperative	7	Javier Castellano	Robert B. Hess Jr.	Loooch Racing Stables & Imaginary Stables	1:53.05	$1,250,000	II	
2016	Stanford	4	Javier Castellano	Todd A. Pletcher	Stonestreet Stables, Derrick Smith, Mrs. John Magnier & Michael Tabor	1:50.55	$1,250,000	II	
2015	Moreno	5	Cornelio Velasquez	Eric J. Guillot	Southern Equine Stable	1:48.81	$1,450,000	II	
2014	Imperative	4	Kent J. Desormeaux	George Papaprodromou	KM Racing Enterprise	1:50.56	$1,500,000	II	
2013	Game On Dude	6	Mike E. Smith	Bob Baffert	Diamond Pride, Lanni Family Trust, Mercedes Stable & Bernie Schiappa	1:49.93	$1,500,000	II	
2012	Caixa Eletronica	7	Javier Castellano	Todd A. Pletcher	Repole Stable	1:50.28	$1,000,000	II	
2011	Duke of Mischief	5	Joe Bravo	David Fawkes	Alex & JoAnn Lieblong, Marilyn McMaster & David Fawkes	1:51.13	$1,000,000	III	
2010	Researcher	6	Luis A. Perez	Jeff C. Runco	Kinross Corporation	1:49.94	$1,000,000	Listed	
2009	Researcher	5	Kendrick Carmouche	Jeff C. Runco	Rutledge Farm	1:49.76	$615,000	Listed	

== See also ==
List of American and Canadian Graded races

== Videos ==
- Charles Town Classic Video, Charles Town – April 16, 2011
- Charles Town Classic Video, Charles Town – April 17, 2010
- Charles Town Classic Video, Charles Town – April 18, 2009
