= Challenger Stakes =

American Thoroughbred horse race in Florida

- Class: Grade III
- Location: Tampa Bay Downs; Oldsmar, Florida
- Inaugurated: 1987
- Race type: Thoroughbred – Flat racing

Race information
- Distance: 1 1/16 miles
- Surface: Dirt
- Track: Left-handed
- Qualification: Four year-olds & older
- Weight: 123 lbs. with allowances
- Purse: $125,000 (2025)

The Challenger Stakes is a Grade III American Thoroughbred horse race for horses four years old or older over a distance of 1 1/16 miles on the dirt track in early March at Tampa Bay Downs, Oldsmar, Florida. The event currently carries a purse of $125,000.

== History ==
The race was inaugurated in 1987 as a late season two-year-old event in the last week of December. For five years between 1992 and 1996 the event was not held.

In 1997 the event was renewed as a three-year-old event and scheduled in February over the shorter distance of 7 furlongs and in 1998 the event received sponsorship from Budweiser which continued until 2007. In 1999 the event was moved to the turf track at a longer distance of one mile.

In 2004 the conditions of the event were changed, in that four-year-olds and older could enter. The distance was extended to the now 1 1/16 miles and the running was on the dirt track.

In 2020 the event was upgraded to a Grade III event.

== Records ==
Speed record:

- 1 1/16 miles – 1:41.20 – Skippylongstocking (2025)
- 1 mile – 1:33.79 – Lucky J J (2000)

Margins:

- 7 1/2 lengths – Darian's Reason (1990)

Most wins by a horse:

- 3 – Skippylongstocking (2023, 2024, 2025)

Most wins by a jockey:

- 3 – Willie Martinez (1991, 2010, 2011)
- 3 - Irad Ortiz Jr. (2018, 2023, 2026)

Most wins by a trainer:

- 5 – Todd A. Pletcher (2001, 2011, 2015, 2017, 2026)

Most wins by an owner:

- 3 – Daniel Alonzo (2023, 2024, 2025)

== Winners ==
Year	Winner	Age	Jockey	Trainer	Owner	Distance	Time	Purse	Grade	Ref
2026	Disruptor	4	Irad Ortiz Jr.	Todd A. Pletcher	Repole Stable, Spendthrift Farm, Big Easy Racing, Titletown Racing, Winners Win, Golconda Stable, Ali Goodrich & Mark Parkinson	1 1/16 miles	1:41.40	$100,000	III	
2025	Skippylongstocking	6	Tyler Gaffalione	Saffie Joseph Jr.	Daniel Alonzo	1 1/16 miles	1:41.20	$95,000	III	
2024	Skippylongstocking	5	Tyler Gaffalione	Saffie Joseph Jr.	Daniel Alonzo	1 1/16 miles	1:43.12	$100,000	III	
2023	Skippylongstocking	4	Irad Ortiz Jr.	Saffie Joseph Jr.	Daniel Alonzo	1 1/16 miles	1:42.52	$100,000	III	
2022	Scalding	4	Javier Castellano	Claude R. McGaughey III	Grandview Equine, Cheyenne Stable & LNJ Foxwoods	1 1/16 miles	1:43.53	$100,000	III	
2021	Last Judgment	5	Daniel Centeno	Michael J. Maker	Michael Dubb, Steve Hornstock, Steve, Bethlehem Stables & Nice Guys Stables	1 1/16 miles	1:41.98	$98,000	III	
2020	Trophy Chaser	4	Paco Lopez	Juan Carlos Avila	JCA Racing Stable	1 1/16 miles	1:42.28	$100,000	III	
2019	Flameaway	4	José L. Ortiz	Mark E. Casse	John C. Oxley	1 1/16 miles	1:41.89	$100,000	Listed	
2018	War Story	6	Irad Ortiz Jr.	Jorge Navarro	Imaginary Stables & Glen Ellis	1 1/16 miles	1:43.43	$100,000		
2017	Stanford	5	John R. Velazquez	Todd A. Pletcher	Stonestreet Stables, Susan Magnier, Michael B. Tabor & Derrick Smith	1 1/16 miles	1:41.75	$100,000		
2016	Adirondack King	7	Javier Castellano	John C. Servis	MarchFore Thoroughbreds	1 1/16 miles	1:44.15	$100,000		
2015	General a Rod	4	John R. Velazquez	Todd A. Pletcher	Skychai Racing & Starlight Racing	1 1/16 miles	1:42.89	$60,000		
2014	Tulira Castle	4	Angel Serpa	James P. DiVito	Curtis C. Green	1 1/16 miles	1:43.68	$58,800		
2013	Flatter This	6	Antonio A. Gallardo	Kathleen O'Connell	Blackacre Farms	1 1/16 miles	1:44.90	$60,000		
2012	Fort Larned	4	Ronald Dale Allen Jr.	Ian R. Wilkes	Janis R. Whitham	1 1/16 miles	1:42.93	$60,000		
2011	Colizeo	4	Willie Martinez	Todd A. Pletcher	Wertheimer & Frere	1 1/16 miles	1:42.94	$60,000		
2010	Bold Start	6	Willie Martinez	Kenneth G. McPeek	Lawrence E. Carrol	1 1/16 miles	1:42.83	$51,500		
2009	Fierce Wind	4	Daniel Centeno	William Phipps	Minor Stables	1 1/16 miles	1:45.01	$65,000		
2008	Wayzata Bay	6	Luis Antonio Gonzalez	Judi A. Hicklin	World Thoroughbreds Racing	1 1/16 miles	1:44.82	$65,000		
2007	Istan	5	José C. Ferrer	William I. Mott	Darpat S.L. Stables	1 1/16 miles	1:43.64	$65,000		
2006	Cherokee Prince	6	Mike Allen	Ronald D. Allen Sr.	Volar Corporation	1 1/16 miles	1:43.13	$65,000		
2005	Tap Day	4	José A. Vélez Jr.	Mark A. Hennig	Edward P. Evans	1 1/16 miles	1:44.58	$65,000		
2004	Attack the Books	5	Derek C. Bell	David H. Hinsley	Mike Crowe & Judy Crowe	1 1/16 miles	1:44.46	$75,000	Listed	
2003	Admiral Lance	3	Pedro A. Rodriguez	James H. Little	James H. Little	1 mile	1:38.58	$50,000		On Turf
2002	Classic Case	3	T. D. Houghton	Mark E. Casse	Stonerside Stable	1 mile	1:36.16	$50,000		
2001	First Spear	3	Christopher DeCarlo	Todd A. Pletcher	Peachtree Stable	1 mile	1:36.56	$50,000	Listed	
2000	Lucky JJ	3	Pedro A. Rodriguez	Richard Ciardullo Jr.	Richard Ciardullo Sr.	1 mile	1:33.79	$45,000		
1999	Marquette	3	Jean-Luc Samyn	Richard Violette Jr.	J. R. Cavanaugh	1 mile	1:35.15	$33,800		
1998	Sejm Run	3	Luis Gonzalez	Julian Canet	Harvey Tenenbaum	7 furlongs	1:25.20	$33,000		
1997	Favorable Regard	3	Kevin Whitley	Marshall Novak	Suzanne Gladden & Marshall Novak	7 furlongs	1:24.80	$28,050		
1992–1996		Race not held								
1991	Lee n Otto	2	Willie Martinez	Glenn Wismer	Tedford M. Randolph	1 1/16 miles	1:49.98	$50,000	Listed	
1990	Darian's Reason	2	Eduardo Nunez	Robert J. Richards Jr.	Schweiger Stables	1 1/16 miles	1:47.00	$50,000		
1989	Slew of Angels	2	Ricardo Lopez	James E. Day	Sam Son Farm	1 1/16 miles	1:46.00	$50,000		
1988	Storm Predictions	2	Steve Gaffalione	Luis A. Olivares	Three G Stable	1 1/16 miles	1:46.60	$50,000		
1987	† Strike the Knight	2	Herson A. Sanchez	John F. Reading	Jerry Cutrona	1 1/16 miles	1:45.40	$50,000		

Legend:
Dirt Turf
Notes:
† Cannon Dancer was first past the post but was disqualified and placed second and Strike the Knight declared the winner

== See also ==
- List of American and Canadian Graded races

== External sites ==
Tampa Bay Downs Media Guide 2021
