= Caixa Eletronica =

American-bred Thoroughbred racehorse

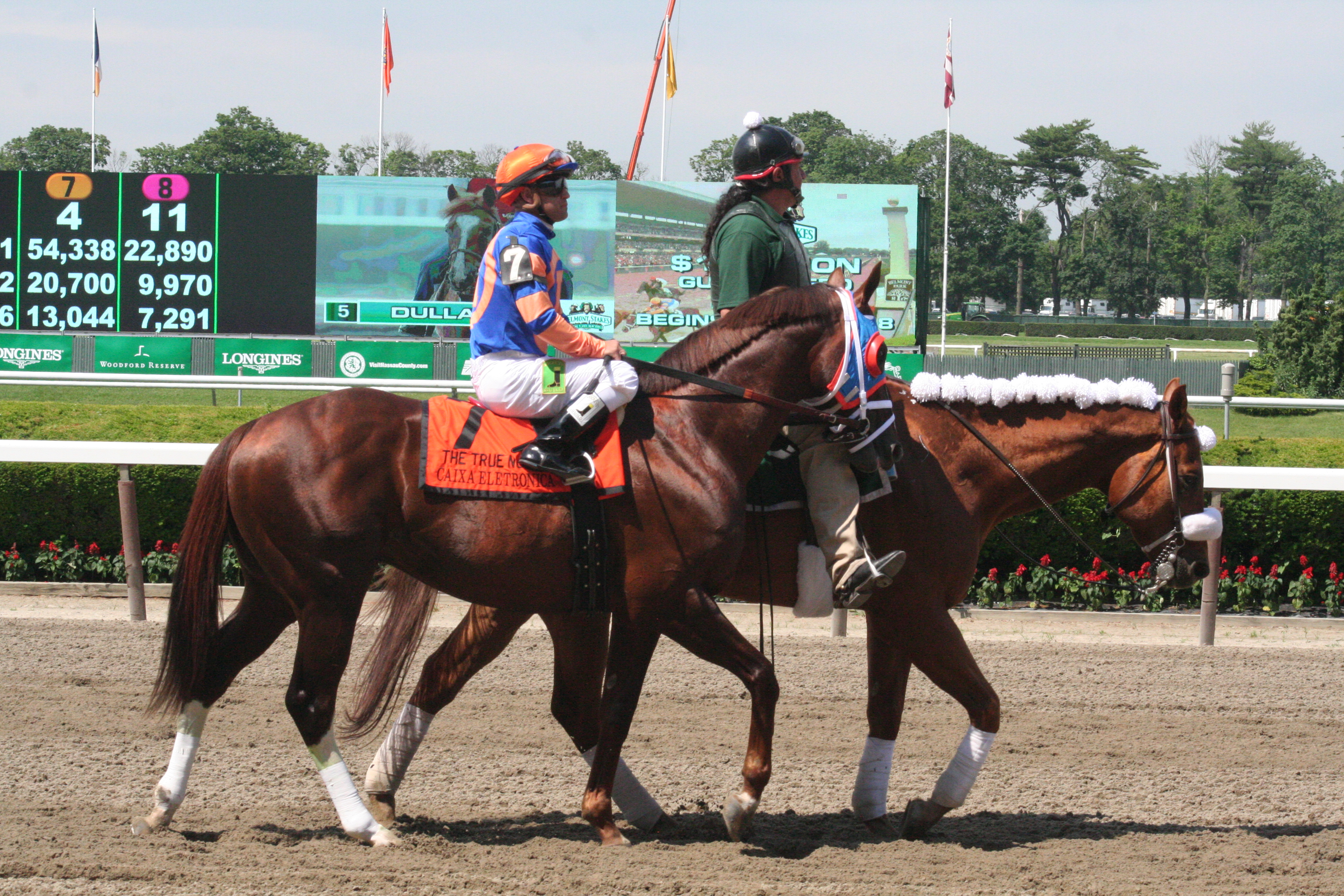
- Caixa Eletronica goes postward for the 2012 True North Handicap
- Sire: Arromanches
- Grandsire: Relaunch
- Dam: Edyta
- Damsire: Skip Away
- Sex: Stallion
- Foaled: February 23, 2005
- Died: January 4, 2014
- Country: United States
- Colour: Chestnut
- Breeder: Richard Rowan
- Owner: Mike Repole
- Trainer: Todd Pletcher
- Record: 54: 18-7-11
- Earnings: US$1,597,455

Major wins
- Westchester Stakes (2011); Charles Town Classic (2012); True North Handicap (2012); Fall Highweight Handicap (2012); Rise Jim Stakes (2012); Uncle Mo Stakes (2013); Duck Dance Stakes (2013)

Caixa Eletronica (February 23, 2005 – January 4, 2014), was an American thoroughbred racehorse and winner of three graded stakes in 2012, at the age of seven.

His sire, Arromanches, was not a stakes-winner and stood for just US$1000 in Indiana, but was also exceptionally durable, racing 78 times in eight seasons. He assembled a nine-race winning streak as an eight-year-old.

Caixa Eletronica performance as a racehorse improved with age, winning his first graded races in 2012. He won the richest race of his career, the 9 furlong, US$1,000,000 Charles Town Classic in April of that year, defeating the previous year's winner, Duke of Mischief. On May 28, he finished fourth behind Shackleford in the one-mile Metropolitan Handicap. He ran back just 12 days later to score a late-charging victory in the True North Handicap, making up more than 14 lengths to win by three-quarters of a length in the six-furlong contest. Caixa Eletronica next tried nine furlongs in the Whitney Invitational at Saratoga on August 4, but faded to eighth. In the September 1st Forego Stakes at 7 furlongs, he finished fourth. Returning to six furlongs at Belmont on September 29, he closed to finish second to The Lumber Guy in the Vosburgh Stakes. After a 7th-place finish in the Bold Ruler Handicap on October 27, he carried 133 pounds to a commanding four-length victory in the Fall Highweight Handicap. He raced in second place behind This One's For Phil for much of the six-furlong contest before drawing off under a hand ride. The win brought his 2012 earnings to US$1,116,000 in 12 races. January 4, 2014 Caixa Eletronica was in a training accident at Belmont Park. Six Drivers, a 4 year old, got loose and collided with 9 year old Caixa Eletronica head on. Both horses died instantly Six Drivers fractured his neck while Caixa Eletronica fractured his skull.
