= Researcher (horse) =

American-bred Thoroughbred racehorse

- Sire: Two Smart
- Grandsire: Two Punch
- Dam: Wild Magnolia
- Damsire: Apalachee
- Sex: Gelding
- Foaled: 2004
- Country: United States
- Colour: Bay
- Breeder: Virginia Tech Foundation, Inc.
- Owner: Rutledge Farm
- Trainer: Jeff Runco
- Record: 27: 13-6-2
- Earnings: $1,379,379

Major wins
- Charles Town Classic (2009, 2010)

Awards
- 2009 Champion Virginia-bred Older Male

Researcher (foaled May 5, 2004, in Virginia) is a Thoroughbred racehorse who competed mostly in the United States. He was bred by the Virginia Tech Foundation, Inc.

A horse from the most humble beginnings , Researcher was bought by Rutledge Farm (Mr. Hermen Greenberg), in 2005, as a $5,000 charitable donation to the Virginia Tech Foundation's M.A.R.E Center, in Middleburg, Virginia. One year after winning the 1st Charles Town Classic, and only a few days before winning the 2nd Charles Town Classic, April 16, 2010, Mr. Zohar Ben-Dov (Kinross Farm) bought Researcher from Mr. Greenberg's estate, for an undisclosed sum. (Mr. Greenberg died February 28, 2010.)

A rare combination of stamina and speed, "Researcher is every horseman's dream..."—a "push button" horse , known for his adaptability.

== Millionaire Status ==
Researcher became a "millionaire" on April 17, 2010, when he earned $600,000 for winning the 2nd Annual $1 Million Charles Town Classic. (He had previously earned $800,129.)

As of April 20, 2010, Researcher is listed as 2010's 4th Leading Money Earner in North America.

== 2009's Highest Speed Figure ==
Researcher earned a record 133 Equibase Speed Figure in 2009's Inaugural Charles Town Classic.

- His 133 Speed Figure was higher than any other horse competing in any other 2009 race in North America. (2009 Breeders' Cup Classic champion Zenyatta only scored a 127, and Rachael Alexandra only scored a 121 in both the 2009 Kentucky Oaks and Haskell Invitational.)
- No horse, in 2011, 2010, 2009, 2008, 2007, or 2006, has run a faster Equibase Speed Figure. (note: Equibase Speed Figures are only available, as far back as 2006, online.)

== Charles Town Classic ==
Researcher was the lone local horse, in a 10-horse field, when he beat Commentator to steal the show at Charles Town Races and Slots, winning the 1st Annual Charles Town Classic, on April 18, 2009.

On April 17, 2010, Researcher defended his title , in the 2nd Annual $1 million Charles Town Classic by winning over a game Awesome Gem. His time was just a fraction off the track's record he set on 3/28/2009.repeated

== Awards ==
The late Hermen Greenberg's Researcher was named 2009 Champion Virginia-bred Older Male on the strength of his wins in the 2009 $500,000 Charles Town Classic Stakes (L) and his second-place finish in the 2009 $100,000 Queens Country Handicap Gr. III at Aqueduct. By Two Smart, out of Wild Magnolia by Apalachee, Researcher won four other West Virginia stakes races while earning $492,859 for 2009.

== Major Wins and Track Records ==
- APRIL 17, 2010
  - 2nd Annual $1 Million Charles Town Classic
  - 1 1/8 mile - 1:49.94
  - Won by 1 3/4 lengths
  - Beyer Speed Figure - 108
  - Equibase Speed Figure - 113
- APRIL 18, 2009
  - 1st Annual Charles Town Classic
  - 1 1/8 mile - 1:49.86
  - Won by 2 1/4 lengths
  - Beyer Speed Figure - 107
  - Equibase Speed Figure - 133
- MARCH 28, 2009 -- (A New Track Record)
  - $40,000 Allowance Race
  - 1 1/8 mile - 1:49.76
  - Won by 22 1/4 lengths
  - Beyer Speed Figure - 106

== Overall Charles Town Racing Record (as of 4-17-2010) ==
14: 12 - 2 - 0 (14 starts: 12 wins - 2 places - 0 shows)

== Profile and statistics ==
- Blood Horse Profile -

== Pedigree ==
- Researcher's pedigree and racing stats

Pedigree of Researcher
Sire Two Smart (USA) 1994	Two Punch (USA); 1983	Mr. Prospector (USA); 1970	Raise A Native (USA); 1961
Sire Two Smart (USA) 1994	Two Punch (USA); 1983	Mr. Prospector (USA); 1970	Gold Digger (USA); 1962
Sire Two Smart (USA) 1994	Two Punch (USA); 1983	Heavenly Cause (USA); 1978	Grey Dawn (FR); 1962
Sire Two Smart (USA) 1994	Two Punch (USA); 1983	Heavenly Cause (USA); 1978	Lady Dulcinea (USA); 1963
Sire Two Smart (USA) 1994	Dancing Smart (USA); 1985	Smarten (USA); 1976	Cyane (USA); 1959
Sire Two Smart (USA) 1994	Dancing Smart (USA); 1985	Smarten (USA); 1976	Smartaire (USA); 1962
Sire Two Smart (USA) 1994	Dancing Smart (USA); 1985	Dancing Dame (USA); 1977	Dancing Count (CAN); 1968
Sire Two Smart (USA) 1994	Dancing Smart (USA); 1985	Dancing Dame (USA); 1977	Dorit (USA); 1971
Dam Wild Magnolia 1985	Apalachee (USA); 1971	Round Table (USA); 1954	Princequillo (IRE); 1940
Dam Wild Magnolia 1985	Apalachee (USA); 1971	Round Table (USA); 1954	Knights Daughter (GB); 1941
Dam Wild Magnolia 1985	Apalachee (USA); 1971	Moccasin (USA); 1963	Nantallah (USA); 1953
Dam Wild Magnolia 1985	Apalachee (USA); 1971	Moccasin (USA); 1963	Rough Shod (GB); 1944
Dam Wild Magnolia 1985	Red Tape (USA); 1988	Red Ryder (USA); 1976	Raise a Native (USA); 1961
Dam Wild Magnolia 1985	Red Tape (USA); 1988	Red Ryder (USA); 1976	Gold Digger (USA); 1962
Dam Wild Magnolia 1985	Red Tape (USA); 1988	Over The Side (USA); 1975	Candy Spots (USA) (1960)
Dam Wild Magnolia 1985	Red Tape (USA); 1988	Over The Side (USA); 1975	Pitch And Roll (USA) (1964)

== Videos ==
- Charles Town Classic 2010 Video, Charles Town - April 17, 2010
- Charles Town Classic 2009 Video, Charles Town - April 18, 2009
- Queens Country Handicap Video, Aqueduct - December 13, 2008
- HBPA Governor's Cup Video, Charles Town - October 16, 2009
- HBPA Governor's Cup Video, Charles Town - October 17, 2008

== News & Links ==
- Fan Page on Facebook
- Thoroughbred Time - Local Star Shines Again In Charles Town Classic
- Blood Horse - Another Classic Victory By Researcher
- BrisNet - Researcher Delivers Title Defense In Charles Town Classic
- Blood Horse - Researcher Goes For CT Classic Repeat
- ESPN - "Researcher Takes CT Classic"
- Blood Horse - Researcher Right At Home In CT Classic
- Thoroughbred Times - "Researcher Outshines Commentator at Charles Town"
- Daily Racing Form - Researcher Does Hokies Proud
- Blood Horse - Researcher Finds Queens County Formula
- Blood Horse - Big Names Nominated to Charles Town Classic
- Equibase - Researcher's 133 is 2009's fastest Equibase Speed Figure
- Virginia Thoroughbred Blog - Virginia-Bred Champions Honored At Colonial Downs
