= Sam Huff =

American football player (1934–2021)

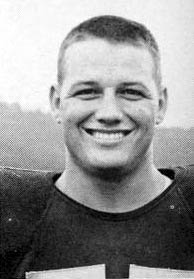
- Huff in college with West Virginia in 1955

No. 70
- Position: Linebacker

Personal information
- Born: October 4, 1934; Edna, West Virginia, U.S.
- Died: November 13, 2021 (aged 87); Winchester, Virginia, U.S.
- Listed height: 6 ft 1 in (1.85 m)
- Listed weight: 230 lb (104 kg)

Career information
- High school: Farmington (Farmington, West Virginia)
- College: West Virginia (1952–1955)
- NFL draft: 1956: 3rd round, 30th overall pick

Career history

Playing
- New York Giants (1956–1963); Washington Redskins (1964–1967, 1969)

Coaching
- Washington Redskins (1969) Linebackers; Washington Redskins (1970) Defense

Awards and highlights
- NFL champion (1956); 2× First-team All-Pro (1958, 1959); 4× Second-team All-Pro (1957, 1960, 1961, 1963); 5× Pro Bowl (1958–1961, 1964); Washington Commanders Ring of Fame; New York Giants Ring of Honor; 9th greatest New York Giant of all-time; First-team All-American (1955); West Virginia Mountaineers No. 75 retired

Career NFL statistics
- Interceptions: 30
- Touchdowns: 5
- Fumble recoveries: 17
- Stats at Pro Football Reference
- Pro Football Hall of Fame
- College Football Hall of Fame

Robert Lee "Sam" Huff (October 4, 1934 – November 13, 2021) was an American professional football player whose frequent battles against Cleveland Browns star fullback Jim Brown made him the first member of the defense to gain widespread prominence in the National Football League. He starred for the New York Giants and the Washington Redskins in the pro ranks and the West Virginia Mountaineers in college. The one-time NFL champion, two-time All-Pro and five-time Pro Bowl selection is a member of the College Football Hall of Fame and the Pro Football Hall of Fame (inducted 1982).

== Early life ==
Huff was born and grew up in the No. 9 coal mining camp in Edna, West Virginia. The fourth of six children of Oral and Catherine Huff, he lived with his family in a small rowhouse with no running water. Huff grew up during the Great Depression while his father and two of his brothers worked in the coal mines loading buggies for Consolidated Mining.

Huff attended and played high school football at the now-closed Farmington High School, where he was both an offensive and defensive lineman. While he was there, Huff helped lead the team to an undefeated season in 1951. He earned All-State honors in 1952 and was named to the first-team All-Mason Dixon Conference.

== College career ==
Huff attended and played college football for West Virginia University, where he majored in physical education. He started at guard as a sophomore, then as a tackle his next two years, after winning a letter as a backup guard during his freshman season. He was a four-year letterman and helped lead West Virginia to a combined four-year mark of 31–7 and a berth in the Sugar Bowl.

In 1955, Huff was voted an All-American and served as co-captain in both the East–West Shrine Game and the Senior Bowl. Huff was also named first team Academic All-American for his outstanding efforts in the classroom.

== Professional career ==
=== New York Giants ===
Huff was drafted in the third round of the 1956 NFL draft by the New York Giants. In training camp, head coach Jim Lee Howell was having a hard time coming up with a position for Huff. Discouraged, Huff left camp, but was stopped at the airport by assistant (offensive) coach Vince Lombardi, who coaxed him back to camp.

Then, defensive coordinator Tom Landry came up with the new 4–3 defensive scheme that he thought would fit Huff perfectly. The Giants switched him from the line to middle linebacker behind Ray Beck. Huff liked the position because he could keep his head up and use his superb peripheral vision to see the whole field. On October 7, 1956, in a game against the Chicago Cardinals, Beck was injured and Huff was put into his first professional game. He then helped the Giants win five consecutive games and they finished with an 8–3–1 record, which gave them the Eastern Conference title. New York went on to win the 1956 NFL Championship Game and Huff became the first rookie middle linebacker to start an NFL championship game.

"Landry built the 4–3 defense around me.
It revolutionized defense and opened the
door for all the variations of zones and
man-to-man coverage, which are used
in conjunction with it today."

— Sam Huff, on Tom Landry's 4–3 defense.

In 1958, the Giants again won the East and Huff played in the 1958 NFL Championship Game. The championship, which became widely known as "The Greatest Game Ever Played", was the first National Football League (NFL) game to go into sudden death overtime. The final score was Baltimore Colts 23, New York Giants 17.

In 1959, Huff and the Giants again went to the NFL Championship Game, which ended in a 31–16 loss to the Colts. Also that year, Huff became the first NFL player to be featured on the cover of Time magazine on November 30, 1959. He almost passed up the magazine appearance, demanding money to be interviewed, but relented when Time agreed to give him the cover portrait. Huff was also the subject of an October 31, 1960 CBS television special, "The Violent World of Sam Huff", broadcast as an episode of the Walter Cronkite-hosted anthology series The Twentieth Century. The network wired Huff for sound in practice and in an exhibition game.

"As long as I live, I will never
forgive Allie Sherman for trading me."

— Sam Huff, on Allie Sherman's decision
to trade him to the Washington Redskins.

The Giants then visited the championship under new coach Allie Sherman in 1961, 1962, and 1963, but lost every one of them. To improve what he thought was a defensive problem, Sherman then traded many defensive players, including Cliff Livingston, Rosey Grier, and Dick Modzelewski. After these trades, Huff went to owner Wellington Mara and was assured he would not be traded. But in 1964, Giants head coach Allie Sherman traded Huff to the Washington Redskins for defensive tackle Andy Stynchula and running back Dick James. The trade made front-page news in New York City and was greeted with jeers from Giants fans, who crowded Yankee Stadium yelling "Huff-Huff-Huff-Huff."

Huff played in four consecutive Pro Bowls with the Giants from 1959 through 1963. He was named most valuable player of the 1961 Pro Bowl.

=== Washington Redskins ===
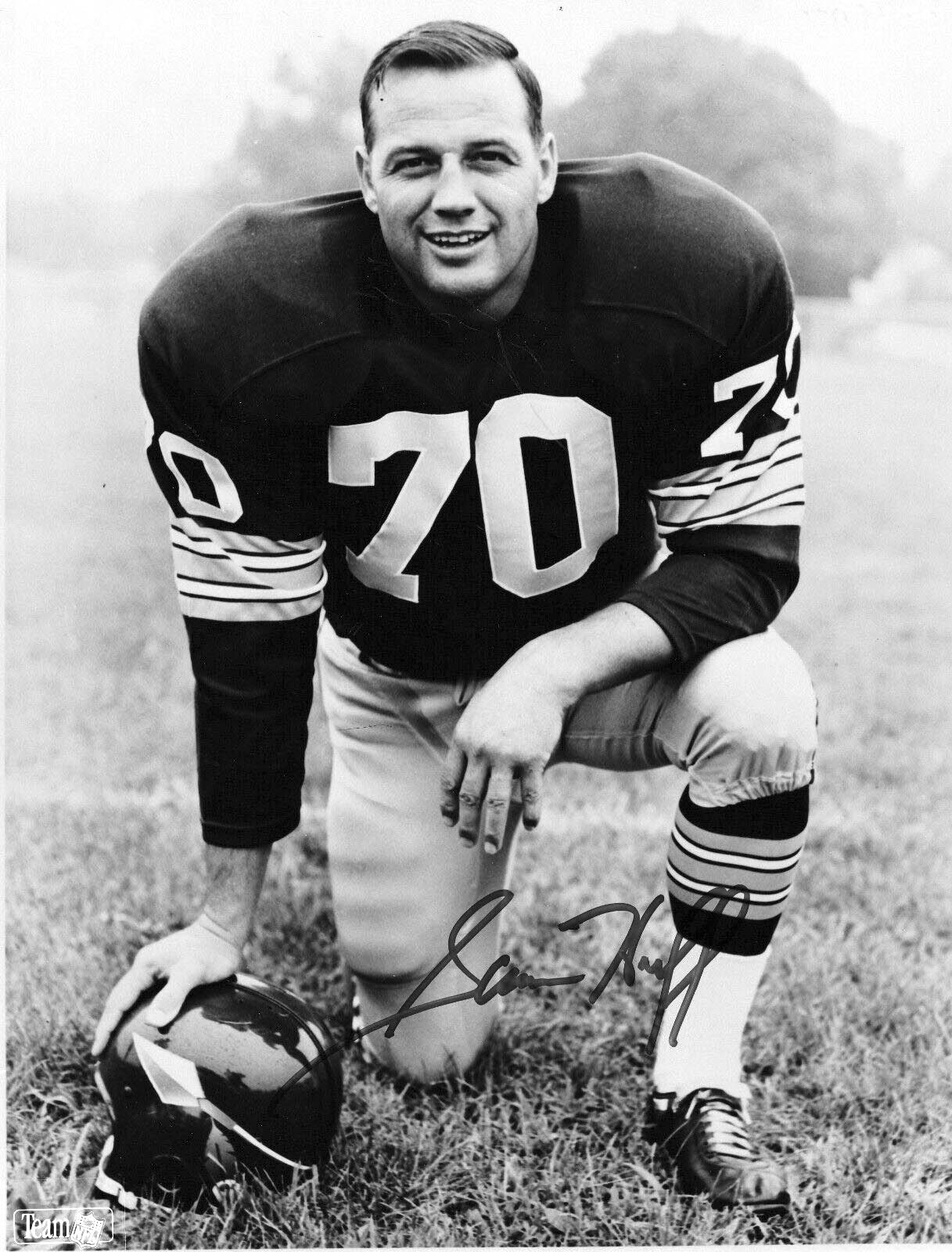
Huff with the Redskins

Huff joined the Redskins in 1964 and they agreed to pay him $30,000 in salary and $5,000 for scouting, compared to the $19,000 he would have made another year with New York. The impact Huff had was almost immediate and the Redskins' defense was ranked second in the NFL in 1965.

On November 27, 1966, Huff and the Redskins beat his former Giant teammates 72–41, in the highest-scoring game in league history. After an ankle injury in 1967 ended his streak of 150 straight games played Huff retired in 1968.

Vince Lombardi talked Huff out of retirement in 1969 when he was named Washington's head coach. The Redskins went 7–5–2 and had their best season since 1955 (which kept Lombardi's record of never having coached a losing NFL team intact). Huff then retired for good after 14 seasons and 30 career interceptions. He spent one season coaching the Redskins' linebackers in 1970 following Lombardi's death from colon cancer.

== After football ==
=== Business ===
After leaving the NFL, Huff took a position with J. P. Stevens in New York City as a textiles sales representative. He later joined the Marriott Corporation as a salesman in 1971, rising to vice president of sports marketing before retiring in 1998. While with Marriott, Huff was responsible for selling over 600,000 room nights via a partnership between the NFL and Marriott that booked teams into Marriott branded hotels for away games. In the late 1950s and early 1960s he was a spokesman for Marlboro cigarettes.

=== Commentator ===
After retiring from football, Huff spent three seasons as a color commentator for the Giants radio team and then moved on in the same capacity to the Redskins Radio Network, where he remained until his retirement at the end of the 2012 season, calling games alongside former Redskins teammate Sonny Jurgensen and play-by-play announcers Frank Herzog (1979–2004) and Larry Michael (2005–2012). He was also a broadcaster for a regionally syndicated TV package of Mountaineer football games in the mid-1980s.

=== Honors ===
In 1982, Huff became the second WVU player to be inducted into both the College and Pro football Halls of Fame. In 1988, he was inducted into the WVU School of Physical Education Hall of Fame and, in 1991 he was inducted into the WVU Sports Hall of Fame.

In 1999, Huff was inducted into the National High School Hall of Fame and was ranked number 76 on the Sporting News' list of the 100 Greatest Football Players.

In 2001, Huff was ranked number six on Sports Illustrated's list of West Virginia's 50 Greatest Athletes. In 2005, Huff's uniform number 75 was retired by West Virginia University.

=== Horse breeding and racing ===
In 1986 Huff began breeding thoroughbred racehorses at Sporting Life Farm in Middleburg, Virginia. His filly, Bursting Forth, won the 1998 Matchmaker Handicap. He also helped establish the West Virginia Breeders' Classic.

=== Politics ===
In 1970, Huff ran for a seat in the U.S. House of Representatives, but lost in the West Virginia Democratic primary for the 1st district against Bob Mollohan by more than 19,000 votes.

=== Illness and death ===
Huff was diagnosed with dementia in 2013. He died at the age of 87 at a hospital in Winchester, Virginia, on November 13, 2021.
