= Colonial Affair =

American-bred Thoroughbred racehorse

- Sire: Pleasant Colony
- Grandsire: His Majesty
- Dam: Snuggle
- Damsire: Nijinsky
- Sex: Stallion
- Foaled: 1990
- Country: United States
- Colour: Bay
- Breeder: Rutledge Farm
- Owner: Centennial Farms; Haras El Paraiso
- Trainer: Scotty Schulhofer
- Record: 20: 7-4-3
- Earnings: $1,635,228

Major wins
- Peter Pan Stakes (1993); Whitney Handicap (1994); Jockey Club Gold Cup (1994); Excelsior Breeders' Cup Handicap (1994) Triple Crown race wins: Belmont Stakes (1993)
- Last updated on August 15, 2007

Colonial Affair (April 19, 1990 – April 23, 2013) was an American Thoroughbred racehorse. He was best known for winning the Belmont Stakes in 1993.

== Background ==
He was sired by 1981 Kentucky Derby and Preakness Stakes winner Pleasant Colony, out of the Rutledge Farm mare Snuggle.

Purchased for $100,000 at the 1991 Fasig-Tipton Saratoga select yearling sale, Colonial Affair was raced by Centennial Farms. He was trained by the 1992 U.S. Racing Hall of Fame inductee Scotty Schulhofer

== Racing career ==
Colonial Affair won the Belmont Stakes under jockey Julie Krone as the 13-1 longshot. His 1993 Belmont triumph is also in the record books, because it was the first time that a woman jockey won any of the three races of the Triple Crown of Thoroughbred Racing.

At age four, Colonial Affair was only three votes shy (out of a possible 247 votes) of winning the 1994 Eclipse Award for American Champion Older Dirt Male Horse (The Wicked North voted the award winner) after winning the Whitney Handicap and Jockey Club Gold Cup that year.

Colonial Affair was the favorite for the 1994 $3 million Breeders' Cup Classic until he broke a bone in his leg, thereby ending his racing career.

== Retirement ==
Colonial Affair was originally retired in 1995 to Gainesway Farm. He was then supposed to be sent to New Zealand in 1998 but was instead sent to Japan and stood privately at a stud at Haras El Paraiso in Argentina.

Colonial Affair died in his stall on April 23, 2013, at Haras El Paraiso in Capitan Sarmiento, Argentina. He was 23.

== Pedigree ==
Pedigree of Colonial Affair
Sire Pleasant Colony (USA) 1978	His Majesty (USA); 1968	Ribot (ITY); 1952	Tenerani
Sire Pleasant Colony (USA) 1978	His Majesty (USA); 1968	Ribot (ITY); 1952	Romanella
Sire Pleasant Colony (USA) 1978	His Majesty (USA); 1968	Flower Bowl (USA); 1952	Alibhai
Sire Pleasant Colony (USA) 1978	His Majesty (USA); 1968	Flower Bowl (USA); 1952	Flower Bed
Sire Pleasant Colony (USA) 1978	Sun Colony (USA); 1968	Sunrise Flight (USA); 1959	Double Jay
Sire Pleasant Colony (USA) 1978	Sun Colony (USA); 1968	Sunrise Flight (USA); 1959	Misty Morn
Sire Pleasant Colony (USA) 1978	Sun Colony (USA); 1968	Colonia (URU); 1959	Cockrullah
Sire Pleasant Colony (USA) 1978	Sun Colony (USA); 1968	Colonia (URU); 1959	Nalga
Dam Snuggle (USA) 1985	Nijinsky II (CAN); 1967	Northern Dancer (CAN); 1961	Nearctic
Dam Snuggle (USA) 1985	Nijinsky II (CAN); 1967	Northern Dancer (CAN); 1961	Natalma*
Dam Snuggle (USA) 1985	Nijinsky II (CAN); 1967	Flaming Page (CAN); 1959	Bull Page
Dam Snuggle (USA) 1985	Nijinsky II (CAN); 1967	Flaming Page (CAN); 1959	Flaring Top
Dam Snuggle (USA) 1985	Mirthful Flirt (USA); 1972	Raise A Native (USA); 1961	Native Dancer*
Dam Snuggle (USA) 1985	Mirthful Flirt (USA); 1972	Raise A Native (USA); 1961	Raise You
Dam Snuggle (USA) 1985	Mirthful Flirt (USA); 1972	Glad Rags (GB); 1963	High Hat
Dam Snuggle (USA) 1985	Mirthful Flirt (USA); 1972	Glad Rags (GB); 1963	Dryad

* Colonial Affair is inbred 5D x 4D to the stallion Native Dancer, meaning that he appears fifth generation (via Natalma) and fourth generation on the dam side of his pedigree.
