= Julie Krone =

American jockey (born 1963)

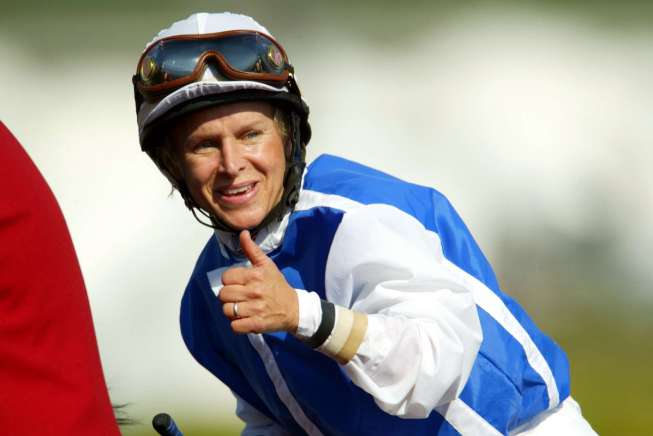
- Julie Krone

Personal information
- Born: July 24, 1963 (age 63) Benton Harbor, Michigan, United States
- Occupations: Retired Hall of Fame jockey, motivational speaker, equine consultant

Horse racing career
- Sport: Horse racing
- Career wins: 3,704

Major racing wins
- Gallant Fox Handicap (1987); Gravesend Handicap (1987); Oceanport Handicap (1987, 1997); Bed O' Roses Breeders' Cup Handicap (1988); Cornhusker Handicap (1988); Flower Bowl Invitational Stakes (1988); Gardenia Stakes (1988); Manitoba Derby (1988); Maryland Million Classic (1989); Excelsior Breeders' Cup Handicap (1989); Yaddo Handicap (1989); Damon Runyon Stakes (1991); Withers Stakes (1991); Arlington Classic (1992); Saratoga Special Stakes (1992); Vosburgh Stakes (1992); Jaipur Stakes (1992); Lexington Stakes (1992, 1993); Queen Elizabeth II Challenge Cup (1992, 1994); Diana Handicap (1993); Sword Dancer Invitational Handicap (1993); Man O' War Stakes (1994); John A. Morris Handicap (1994); Honorable Miss Handicap (1994); Woodbine Mile (1995); Demoiselle Stakes (1995); Shadwell Turf Mile Stakes (1995, 1996); Carter Handicap (1996); Hudson Stakes (NYB) (1996); Vagrancy Handicap (1996); Sky Classic Stakes (1996); Sabin Stakes (1998); Malibu Stakes (2002); Black Helen Handicap (1999); Pacific Classic Stakes (2003); Vernon O. Underwood Stakes (2002, 2003); Moccasin Stakes (2003); Del Mar Debutante Stakes (2003); San Clemente Handicap (2003); Del Mar Futurity (2003); Oak Leaf Stakes (2003); Citation Handicap (2003); Hollywood Derby (2003) American Classics wins: Belmont Stakes (1993) Breeders' Cup wins: Breeders' Cup Juvenile Fillies (2003) International race wins: Dominion Day Stakes (1988); Manitoba Derby (1988); Molson Million (1995)

Racing awards
- Big Sport of Turfdom Award (1988); ESPY Award for Best U.S. Female Athlete (1994); Wilma Rudolph Courage Award (2004)

Honours
- United States Cowgirl Hall of Fame (1999); National Museum of Racing and Hall of Fame (2000); Michigan Sports Hall of Fame (2002); National Women's Hall of Fame (2013)

Significant horses
- Candy Ride, Colonial Affair, Da Hoss, Halfbridled, Peaks and Valleys, Royal Mountain Inn, Sweet Return, Rubiano, Safely Kept, Housebuster, Lite the Fuse
- Updated on April 24, 2015

Julieann Louise Krone (born July 24, 1963) is a retired American jockey. In 1993, she became the first (and as of May 26, 2026 only) female jockey to win a Triple Crown race when she captured the Belmont Stakes aboard Colonial Affair. In 2000, she became the first woman inducted into the National Museum of Racing and Hall of Fame, and in 2003 became the first female jockey to win a Breeders' Cup race. She has also been honored by induction into the National Women's Hall of Fame, Michigan Women's Hall of Fame, and Cowgirl Hall of Fame.

== Riding career ==
Krone was born in Benton Harbor, Michigan. After spending her childhood as an accomplished show horse rider at competitions in western Michigan, Krone was inspired by the career of Steve Cauthen to become a professional Thoroughbred jockey. She made her debut as a jockey on January 30, 1981, at Tampa Bay Downs in Florida, on a horse named Tiny Star. She won her first race on February 12, 1981, also at Tampa Bay Downs, aboard Lord Farkle. Within a few years, her success made her a well-known racing personality. Krone was the only woman to win riding championships at Belmont Park, Gulfstream Park, Monmouth Park, The Meadowlands and Atlantic City Race Course. She would go on to make appearances on The Late Show with David Letterman, The Tonight Show with Jay Leno, and appear on the cover of Sports Illustrated for the issue of May 22, 1989, one of only eight jockeys so recognized (the others are Willie Shoemaker, Bill Hartack, Eddie Arcaro, Johnny Longden, John Sellers, Robyn Smith and Steve Cauthen). In 1993 she received an ESPY Award as Female Athlete of the Year.

Krone retired for the first time on April 18, 1999, with a three-winner day at Lone Star Park, near Dallas. She embarked upon a broadcasting career in horse racing. From 1999 to 2000 she worked as an analyst for TVG Network, then worked as a paddock analyst for Hollywood Park from 1999 to 2002. She came out of retirement at Santa Anita Park in November 2002. After a good start to the 2003 season, she fractured two bones in her lower back and spent the next four months recovering. She returned to lead the 2003 Del Mar jockeys in purse earnings, then went on to become the first woman jockey to win a Breeders' Cup race when she rode Halfbridled to victory in the 2003 Breeders' Cup Juvenile Fillies at Santa Anita. On December 12, 2003, just weeks after her Breeders' Cup win, she broke several ribs and suffered severe muscle tears in a fall at Hollywood Park Racetrack. Though not fully recovered from her injuries, Krone attempted to come back on February 14, 2004, at Santa Anita Park but failed to win in three races. She did not ride again; on July 8 of that year, she made a statement in which she did not officially retire, but strongly hinted that she would never race again.

Because of her success in the face of severe injuries sustained while racing, Krone was named by USA Today as one of the 10 Toughest Athletes and was honored with the Wilma Rudolph Courage Award by the Women's Sports Foundation. Krone also had been inducted into the Cowgirl Hall of Fame in Fort Worth, Texas, and is a member of the Michigan Sports Hall of Fame. In October 2013 she was inducted into the National Women's Hall of Fame in Seneca Falls, New York, and in 2014 she was inducted into the Michigan Women's Hall of Fame. In 2018 a bronze statue of her was given to the National Museum of Racing and Hall of Fame.

== Personal life ==
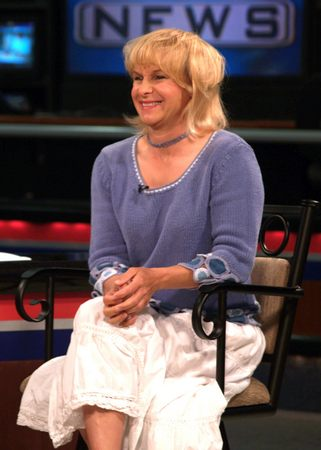
Krone in 2006

In 2001 Krone married Jay Hovdey, executive columnist for the Daily Racing Form. She gave birth to their daughter Lorelei Judith Krone in 2005. (Hovdey also has a son, Ed, from his previous marriage.) Her mother, Judi Krone, was an accomplished equestrian who died a few days before Christmas of 1999.

Since her second retirement from racing, Krone has focused on parenting and worked as a racing broadcaster, motivational speaker, and an instructor of natural horsemanship. Krone rode in one sanctioned betting race at Santa Anita Park on October 18, 2008, competing against seven other retired Hall of Fame jockeys: Gary Stevens, Pat Day, Chris McCarron, Jerry Bailey, Ángel Cordero, Jacinto Vásquez and Sandy Hawley. Krone also rode to victory on Invincible Hero in the Leger Legends for famous retired European jockeys at the St Leger Festival, Doncaster Racecourse (UK), on September 7, 2011.

Krone's autobiography, Riding for My Life, was published in 1995.
