= Harlan's Holiday Stakes =

- Class: Grade III
- Location: Gulfstream Park; Hallandale Beach, Florida, United States
- Inaugurated: 2011
- Race type: Thoroughbred - Flat racing - Dirt
- Website: Gulfstream Park

Race information
- Distance: 1 1/16 miles
- Surface: Dirt
- Track: Left-handed
- Qualification: Three year olds and older
- Weight: Base weights with allowances: 4-year-olds and older: 126 lbs. 3-year-olds: 123 lbs.
- Purse: $165,000 (2024)

The Harlan's Holiday Stakes is a Grade III American Thoroughbred horse race open for three years old or older, over a distance of 1 1/16 miles on the dirt track held annually in December at Gulfstream Park, Hallandale Beach, Florida. The event currently carries a purse of $165,000.

== History ==
The race was inaugurated in 2011 and named after the winning horse Harlan's Holiday who won 9 races in his career including the Grade I Florida Derby and Grade I Donn Handicap.

The event has been run at the 1 1/16 miles distance since its inception.

The event was upgraded to a Grade III event in 2005.

== Records ==
Speed record:

- 1:41.73 - River Seven (2013)

Margins:

- 5 1/4 lengths – Trickmeister (2011)

Most wins

- 2 - Skippylongstocking (2022, 2025)

Most wins by a jockey

- 4 - Luis Saez (2012, 2018, 2020, 2021)

Most wins by a trainer

- 3 - Todd A. Pletcher (2014, 2016, 2021)
- 3 - Saffie Joseph Jr. (2022, 2023, 2025)

Most wins by an owner

- 2 - Daniel Alonso (2022, 2025)

== Winners ==
Year	Winner	Age	Jockey	Trainer	Owner	Distance	Time	Purse	Grade	Ref
2025	Skippylongstocking	6	Tyler Gaffalione	Saffie Joseph Jr.	Daniel Alonso	1 1/16 miles	1:43.05	$150,000	III	
2024	Rocket Can	6	Junior Alvarado	William I. Mott	Frank Fletcher Racing Operations	1 1/16 miles	1:45.01	$150,000	III	
2023	O'Connor (CHI)	6	Tyler Gaffalione	Saffie Joseph Jr.	Michael & Julia C. Iavarone & Fernando Vine Ode	1 1/16 miles	1:43.80	$150,000	III	
2022	Skippylongstocking	3	Irad Ortiz Jr.	Saffie Joseph Jr.	Daniel Alonso	1 1/16 miles	1:42.76	$150,000	III	
2021	Fearless	5	Luis Saez	Todd A. Pletcher	Repole Stable	1 1/16 miles	1:42.19	$150,000	III	
2020	Tax	4	Luis Saez	Danny Gargan	R. A. Hill Stable, Reeves Thoroughbred Racing & Hugh Lynch	1 1/16 miles	1:41.15	$100,000	III	
2019	War Story	7	Luis Saez	Elizabeth L. Dobles	Imaginary Stables & G. Ellis	1 1/16 miles	1:42.45	$100,000	III	
2018	Sir Anthony	3	Brian Hernandez Jr.	Anthony Mitchell	Richard Otto Stable	1 1/16 miles	1:45.14	$100,000	III	
2017	Fear The Cowboy	5	Javier Castellano	Efren Loza Jr.	Kathleen Amaya & Raffael Centofanti	1 1/16 miles	1:42.23	$100,000	III	
2016	Stanford	4	John R. Velazquez	Todd A. Pletcher	Stonestreet Stables, S. Magnier, M.B. Tabor and D. Smith	1 1/16 miles	1:42.10	$100,000	III	
2015	Valid	5	Javier Castellano	Marcus J. Vitali	Crossed Sabres Farm	1 1/16 miles	1:42.27	$100,000	Listed	
2014	Liam's Map	3	John R. Velazquez	Todd A. Pletcher	Teresa Viola Racing Stables	1 1/16 miles	1:42.51	$100,000		
2013	River Seven	3	Joseph Rocco Jr.	Nicholas Gonzalez	Tucci Stables	1 1/16 miles	1:41.73	$100,000		
2012	Csaba	3	Luis Saez	Philip A. Gleaves	Bruce Hollander & Carl Shapoff	1 1/16 miles	1:43.51	$100,000	Listed	
2011	Trickmeister	4	Javier Castellano	Richard E. Dutrow Jr.	Pegasus Holding Group Stables & IEAH Stable	1 1/16 miles	1:42.63	$60,000		

== See also ==
List of American and Canadian Graded races
